= Fedor Chudinov vs. Frank Buglioni =

Boxing match

Man vs Machine
- Date: 26 September 2015
- Venue: Wembley Arena, Wembley, London, UK
- Title(s) on the line: WBA (Regular) super middleweight title

Tale of the tape
Boxer	Fedor Chudinov	Frank Buglioni
Nickname		"The Wise Guy"
Hometown	Serpukhov, Moscow Oblast, Russia	Enfield, London, UK
Pre-fight record	13–0 (10 KO)	17–1–1 (13 KO)
Age	28 years	26 years, 5 months
Height	5 ft 9 1/2 in (177 cm)	6 ft 1 in (185 cm)
Weight	167 lb (76 kg)	167 lb (76 kg)
Style	Orthodox	Orthodox
Recognition	WBA (Regular); Super Middleweight Champion; TBRB; No. 7 Ranked Super Middleweight; The Ring; No. 9 Ranked Super Middleweight	WBA; No. 4 Ranked Super Middleweight; WBA Inter-Continental super middleweight champion

Result
- Chudinov wins via 12–round unanimous decision (120–106, 118–108, 117–109)

Fedor Chudinov vs. Frank Buglioni, billed as Man vs Machine, was a professional boxing match contested on 26 September 2015, for the WBA (Regular) super middleweight championship. The bout took place at Wembley Arena, with Chudinov winning by unanimous decision.

== Background ==
On 9 May 2015, WBA interim champion, Chudinov, defeated Felix Sturm to win the vacant WBA (Regular) title. Carl Froch had been stripped of title for inactivity. Buglioni, regained composure following the loss of his undefeated record against Sergey Khomitsky in April 2014, going on a 5-fight unbeaten streak, culminating in a draw against Lee Markham in his previous bout.

Before the announcement of the fight with Buglioni, a voluntary defence against reigning middleweight champion, Gennady Golovkin, and world title consolidation against Andre Ward were among the options being considered for Chudinov's next match. On 7 June 2015, Chudinov's promoter, Vladimir Hryunov, announced that Chudinov would fight Buglioni on 24 July in London. In the lead-up to the fight, it was announced that Chudinov and Buglioni were to be trained by Roy Jones Jr. and Steve Collins respectively. Buglioni also stated his intention to have a unification bout against George Groves who was scheduled to challenge for the WBC title, or IBF champion James DeGale.

On July 13, Chudinov was forced to pull out after sustaining a broken nose in sparring. On July 21, Fernando Castaneda was announced as Chudinov's replacement opponent. Buglioni defeated Castaneda via 4th-round knockout, winning the vacant WBA Inter-Continental title in the process. Chudinov and Buglioni rescheduled the fight for 26 September on BoxNation.

== Fight details ==
In the opening round, Chudinov adopted an aggressive stance, utilising his jab effectively and delivering straight right punches. Conversely, Buglioni maintained a defensive position, countering with rapid combinations while situated against the ropes. As the early rounds progressed, Chudinov sustained his aggressive approach, applying consistent pressure and sustaining a high work rate, while Buglioni responded with short punches and rallies at times. In the sixth round, Chudinov and Buglioni exchanged punches up close. In the final few seconds, Buglioni landed a powerful right hand that hurt Chuninov, following up with a series of blows. As the bell sounded, Buglioni landed another right hand, sending Chudinov to the canvas. No knockdown was ruled, and Buglioni had two points deducted by Referee Terry O'Connor, for punching after the bell. Buglioni, sensing Chudinov may not have fully recovered, started the seventh round on the offensive, landing a barrage of solid punches. In response, Chudinov retaliated with his own combinations, coming on strong. In the eighth, Buglioni, visibly tired, remained on the back foot, as Chuninov, led with the jab and cut off the ring. In the final few seconds, both Chudinov and Buglioni traded punches to end the round. Buglioni unleashed a quick flurry and body shots to kick off the ninth round. Chudinov, firing back and walking Buglioni down, with right and left hooks to the head at close range. In the later rounds, Chudinov pressed forward, landing accurate punches, as Buglioni, whose right cheekbone started to swell, looked to land his own countering shots on the inside. All three judges unanimously scored the fight in favour of Cleverly, with scores of 120–106, 118–108 and 1117–109.

== Aftermath ==
On 4 January 2016, Chudinov was promoted to Super champion. Chudinov was defeated by Sturm in a rematch on 20 February, by majority decision to lose the title. On 9 March 2016, Buglioni announced that he would move up to the light-heavyweight division and challenged British champion, Hosea Burton. Buglioni defeated Burton later in the year, winning the Lonsdale Belt.

== Fight card ==
Confirmed bouts:

Weight Class		vs.		Method	Round	Time	Notes
Super-middleweight	Fedor Chudinov (c)	def.	Frank Buglioni	UD	12/12		^{Note 1}
Heavyweight	Derek Chisora	def.	Marcelo Nascimento	PTS	10/10
Super-bantamweight	Bobby Jenkinson	def.	Lewis Pettitt	TKO	11/12	2:38	^{Note 2}
Featherweight	Ryan Walsh	def.	Samir Mouneimne	SD	12/12		^{Note 3}
Lightweight	Jamie Kavanagh	vs.	Reynaldo Mora	PTS	6/6
Preliminary bouts
Welterweight	Bradley Skeete (c)	def.	Mark Thompson	TKO	3/10	1:07	^{Note 4}
Light-middleweight	Gary Corcoran	def.	Rick Skelton	PTS	10/10
Light-middleweight	Ahmet Patterson	def.	Giorgi Ungiadze	TKO	8/10	2:52
Lightweight	Romeo Romaeo	def.	Chris Adaway	PTS	8/8
Lightweight	Ediz Hussein	def.	Alex Phillips	PTS	6/6
Lightweight	Boy Jones Jr	def.	Antonio Horvatic	PTS	4/4
Super-middleweight	Billy Long	def.	Christian Hoskin Gomez	PTS	4/4

^Note 1 For WBA (Regular) super-middleweight title
^Note 2 For Commonwealth super-bantamweight title
^Note 3 For British featherweight title
^Note 4 For WBO European welterweight title

== Broadcasting ==
Country	Broadcasters
Country	Cable/Pay TV
United Kingdom	BoxNation

Preceded by vs. Felix Sturm	Fedor Chudinov's bouts 26 September 2015	Succeeded by vs. Felix Sturm II
Preceded by vs. Fernando Castañeda	Frank Buglioni's bouts 26 September 2015	Succeeded by vs. Olegs Fedotovs
