= Vincent Feigenbutz vs. Giovanni De Carolis II =

Boxing match

The Moment of Truth
- Date: 9 January 2016
- Venue: Baden-Arena, Offenburg, Germany
- Title(s) on the line: WBA (Regular) and GBU super middleweight titles

Tale of the tape
Boxer	Vincent Feigenbutz	Giovanni De Carolis
Nickname	KO King	
Hometown	Karlsruhe, Baden-Württemberg, Germany	Rome, Italy
Pre-fight record	21–1 (19 KO)	23–6 (11 KO)
Age	20 years, 3 months	31 years, 4 months
Height	5 ft 10 1/2 in (179 cm)	6 ft 0 1/2 in (184 cm)
Weight	167 lb (76 kg)	167 lb (76 kg)
Style	Orthodox	Orthodox
Recognition	WBA Interim and GBU; Super Middleweight Champion	WBA; No. 14 Ranked Super Middleweight

Result
- De Carolis wins via 11th-round TKO

Vincent Feigenbutz vs. Giovanni De Carolis II, billed as The Moment of Truth, was a professional boxing match contested on 9 January 2016, for the WBA (Regular) and GBU super middleweight championship. The bout took place at Baden-Arena, with De Carolis winning by technical knockout in the eleventh round.

== Background ==
Feigenbutz and De Carolis first fought in 2015, with Feigenbutz defending his WBA interim and GBU titles at Dm-Arena. Feigenbutz won by a controversial unanimous decision with scores of 115–113, 114–113, and 115–113.

On 22 November 2015, it was announced that Feigenbutz and De Carolis would fight in a rematch on 9 January 2016, at the Baden-Arena. In the lead-up to the fight, Feigenbutz stated his intention to score a decisive victory against De Carolis.

On 5 January 2016, it was announced that the vacant WBA (Regular) title would be on the line. The WBA's ruling came following Andre Ward’s move up to the light heavyweight division and the subsequent promotion of reigning champion, Fedor Chudinov to Super champion. Feigenbutz was looking to become the youngest German champion in history.

== Fight details ==
In the early rounds, De Carolis started strong, showcasing superior technique and landing clean shots. Feigenbutz struggled to find his rhythm, with De Carolis controlling the pace and outscoring him in most exchanges. In the middle rounds, Feigenbutz began to rally, landing some effective combinations and showing resilience. These rounds were more competitive, with Feigenbutz narrowing the gap slightly. In the later rounds, De Carolis regained control, using his jab effectively and exploiting Feigenbutz's defensive lapses. The Italian fighter's consistent pressure and accuracy kept him ahead on the scorecards. In the eleventh, De Carolis unleashed a relentless assault, forcing the referee to step in and stop the fight. At the time of stoppage, two judges had De Carolis ahead 96–94 and one judge 98–92.

== Aftermath ==
Following De Carolis' win, in the post-fight interview, De Carolis expressed interest in a trilogy with Feigenbutz. De Carolis was defeated by Tyron Zeuge in a rematch on November 5, by knockout to lose the title.

== Fight card ==
Confirmed bouts:

Weight Class		vs.		Method	Round	Time	Notes
Super-middleweight	Giovanni De Carolis	def.	Vincent Feigenbutz (c)	TKO	11/12	0:32	^{Note 1}
Cruiserweight	Norair Mikaeljan	def.	Valery Brudov	UD	10		^{Note 2}
Cruiserweight	Alexander Peil	def.	Ivan Brkljaca	UD	4
Super-middleweight	Leon Bauer	def.	Ondrej Marvan	TKO	1/4	2:33
Heavyweight	Derek Chisora	def.	Andras Csomor	TKO	2/8	2:08
Light-heavyweight	Stefan Härtel	def.	Jozsef Racz	UD	6
Cruiserweight	Artur Mann	vs.	Phillip Palm	TKO	5/6	2:55
Super-middleweight	Patrick Wojcicki	def.	Serhii Ksendzov	UD	4
Heavyweight	Dennis Lewandowski	def.	Aziz Baran	UD	6
Heavyweight	Alexander Hofmann	def.	Bekim Pergega	RTD	2/4	3:00

^Note 1 For WBA (Regular) and GBU super-middleweight titles
^Note 2 For For WBO International cruiserweight title

== Broadcasting ==
Country	Broadcasters	
Country	Free-to-air	Cable/Pay TV
Germany	Sat.1	—N/a
United Kingdom	—N/a	Sky Sports

Preceded by First Bout	Vincent Feigenbutz's bouts 9 January 2016	Succeeded by vs. Crispulo Javier Andino
Preceded by First Bout	Giovanni De Carolis's bouts 9 January 2016	Succeeded by vs. Tyron Zeuge
