= William Scull (boxer) =

Cuban Boxer (born 1992)

Personal information
- Nicknames: El Indomable ("The Indomitable")
- Born: William Scull Yero; 6 June 1992 (age 34) Matanzas, Cuba
- Height: 5 ft 11 1/2 in (182 cm)
- Weight: Super middleweight

Boxing career
- Stance: Orthodox

Boxing record
- Total fights: 26
- Wins: 24
- Win by KO: 10
- Losses: 2

William Scull Yero (born 6 June 1992) is a Cuban-German professional boxer. He held the International Boxing Federation (IBF) super-middleweight title from 2024 to 2025.

== Professional career ==
Scull turned professional in 2016 and won the first 22 fights of his career and by 2024, he was listed as the mandatory challenger for Canelo Alvarez's IBF's super-middleweight title. However, Alvarez decided not to fight Scull and to relinquish the IBF belt instead. Scull was ordered to fight the #2 ranked contender Vladimir Shishkin for the IBF super-middleweight title. The pair met at Stadthalle in Falkensee, Germany, on 19 October 2024 with Scull winning by unanimous decision.

Scull finally faced Álvarez, who still held the WBA, WBC and WBO super-middleweight titles, at ANB Arena in Riyadh, Saudi Arabia, on 3 May 2025, losing via unanimous decision to suffer his first defeat as a professional.

== Professional boxing record ==
26 fights	24 wins	2 losses
By knockout	10	1
By decision	14	1

No.	Result	Record	Opponent	Type	Round, time	Date	Location	Notes
26	Win	24–2	Evander Castillo	KO	4 (8)	3 Jul 2026	Eissporthalle Essen, Essen, Nordrhein-Westfalen, Germany	
25	Loss	23–2	Jacob Bank	KO	12 (12), 2:37	31 Jan 2026	Sydbank Arena, Kolding, Denmark	For WBO Global super-middleweight title
24	Loss	23–1	Canelo Álvarez	UD	12	3 May 2025	ANB Arena, Riyadh, Saudi Arabia	Lost IBF super middleweight title; For WBA (Super), WBC, WBO, and The Ring super middleweight titles
23	Win	23–0	Vladimir Shishkin	UD	12	19 Oct 2024	Stadthalle, Falkensee, Germany	Won vacant IBF super-middleweight title
22	Win	22–0	Sean Hemphill	UD	8	4 May 2024	T-Mobile Arena, Paradise, Nevada, U.S.	
21	Win	21–0	Cristian Fabian Rios	UD	6	7 Oct 2023	Stadthalle, Falkensee, Germany	
20	Win	20–0	Abel Nicolas Adriel	UD	8	12 Nov 2022	AGON Sportpark, Charlottenburg, Germany	
19	Win	19–0	Evgeny Shvedenko	UD	12	2 Jul 2022	Stadtwerke Arena, Erding, Germany	
18	Win	18–0	Deneb Diaz	KO	2 (10)	26 Nov 2021	AGON Sportpark, Charlottenburg, Germany	Won vacant IBF Latino super-middleweight title
17	Win	17–0	Dragan Lepei	KO	2 (12)	28 May 2021	AGON Sportpark, Charlottenburg, Germany	Retained IBO International super-middleweight title
16	Win	16–0	Gino Kanters	UD	12	27 Feb 2021	AGON Sportpark, Charlottenburg, Germany	Won vacant IBO International super-middleweight title
15	Win	15–0	Mathias Eklund	TKO	4 (8)	28 Aug 2020	Havelstudios, Charlottenburg, Germany	
14	Win	14–0	Siarhei Khamitski	UD	8	21 Sept 2019	Sporthalle, Zinnowitz, Germany	
13	Win	13–0	Sebastian Horacio Papeschi	TKO	6 (12)	20 Jul 2019	Complejo Deportivo, Justiniano Posse, Argentina	Won South American super-middleweight title
12	Win	12–0	Roman Shkarupa	UD	8	15 Jun 2019	Sport- und Kongresshalle, Schwerin, Germany	
11	Win	11–0	Basilio Silva	UD	8	15 Mar 2019	Club Atletico Racing, Trelew, Argentina	
10	Win	10–0	Ivan Sakic	KO	2 (8)	10 Nov 2018	Sporthalle Zur Kuhdrift 1, Neustadt-Glewe, Germany	
9	Win	9–0	Jose Luis Yana	KO	5 (6)	25 Aug 2018	Gimnasio Heroes de Malvinas, Playa Unión, Argentina	
8	Win	8–0	Martin Fidel Rios	UD	6	19 May 2018	Club Deportivo Huracan, Trelew, Argentina	
7	Win	7–0	Miguel Eduardo Gorosito	TKO	4 (6)	3 Feb 2018	Nuevo Palacio Aurinegro, Puerto Madryn, Argentina	
6	Win	6–0	Christian Fabian Rios	UD	8	22 Dec 2017	Gimnasio Municipal, Trelew, Argentina	
5	Win	5–0	Emilano German Vivas	UD	6	1 Jul 2017	Parque La Pedrera, Villa Mercedes, Argentina	
4	Win	4–0	Carlos Dante Moyano	UD	6	8 Apr 2017	Club Social y Deportivo San Vicente, Bell Ville, Argentina	
3	Win	3–0	Gustavo Rene Benitez	UD	6	18 Feb 2017	Club Ciclista Juninense, Junin, Argentina	
2	Win	2–0	Victor Hugo Exner	KO	4 (6)	28 Jan 2017	Club Social y Deportivo Los Millonarios, Bragado, Argentina	
1	Win	1–0	Gaston Dario Avalos	KO	1 (4)	11 Nov 2016	Polideportivo Fortunato Perazzoli San Carlos, Argentina	

== See also ==
- List of male boxers
- List of world super-middleweight boxing champions

Sporting positions
Regional boxing titles
Preceded by Sebastian Horacio Papeschi	South American super-middleweight champion 20 July 2019 – 2021; Vacated	Vacant Title next held by Abraham Gabriel Buonarrigo
Vacant Title last held by Vincent Feigenbutz	IBO International super-middleweight champion 27 February 2021 – 2022; Vacated	Vacant Title next held by Osleys Iglesias
Vacant Title last held by Martin Fidel Rios	IBF Latino super-middleweight champion 26 November 2021 – 2022; Vacated	Vacant Title next held by Pablo Ezequiel Corzo
World boxing titles
Vacant Title last held by Canelo Álvarez	IBF super-middleweight champion 19 October 2024 – 3 May 2025	Succeeded by Canelo Álvarez
