= Vladimir Shishkin =

Vladimir Shishkin may refer to:

- Vladimir Shishkin (hurdler) (born 1964), Russian track and field athlete
- Vladimir Shishkin (boxer) (born 1991), Russian boxer
