= Travell =

Travell is a given name and a surname.

Notable people with the given name include:

- Travell Dixon (born 1991), American football player
- Travell Mazion (1995–2020), American boxer

Notable people with the surname include:

- Janet G. Travell (1901–1997), American physician and medical researcher
