= Enrico Kölling =

German boxer

Personal information
- Born: 27 February 1990 (age 36) Berlin, Germany
- Height: 5 ft 11 in (180 cm)
- Weight: Light-Heavyweight

Boxing career
- Reach: 72 1/2 in (184 cm)

Boxing record
- Total fights: 33
- Wins: 28
- Win by KO: 9
- Losses: 5
Medal record
Men's amateur boxing
Representing Germany
Youth World Championships
Silver medal – second place	2008 Guadalajara	Middleweight

Enrico Kölling (born 27 February 1990), occasionally spelled Koelling or Kolling, is a German professional boxer who challenged for the IBF light-heavyweight title in 2017.

== Amateur career ==
=== Youth ===
Enrico Kölling started boxing at the age of 8. An early step in his career was winning the gold medal at the German Junior National Championships at the age of 17, in Altentreptow in 2007, as he defeated Alexander Onozke and Dominik Bösel in the middle weight division.

Kölling first achieved success at international level in July 2007, when he grasped the bronze medal following his defeat in the middle weight (75 kg) semi final at the 2007 European Amateur Boxing Championships in Sambor, Serbia; he lost his semifinal to Nikola Jovanovic, the only boxer from the host nation to win a title at the event. In the following year, 2008, Kölling competed at the Youth World Amateur Boxing Championships, in which a total of 359 fighters from 68 different countries competed in Guadalajara, Mexico. After beating four of his opponents, Kölling failed to get the gold medal in the middle weight final, which was scored 4:2 in favour of Rey Eduardo Recio from Cuba.

=== Senior ===
After he moved up a weight division, at the age of 19, Kölling became the German National champion at light heavyweight (81 kg), beating Eugen Schellenberg, Dennis Gördel and Benjamin Schmidt.

In May 2011, Kölling secured his spot in the Germany National team to take part at the 2011 World Amateur Boxing Championships to be held in Baku, Azerbaijan between 16 September 2011 to 1 October, following his victory against his compatriot Tyron Zeuge in the Round Robin Team Tournament in Germany. Kölling entered into the World Championship as the No.4 seeded athlete in the 81 kg. division, gaining a bye in first round. He beat Erdenebayar Sandagsuren of Mongolia in the second round on points, before he was defeated by the eventual winner Julio César la Cruz after 3 rounds, 8–6 on points. Through his performance at this competition he qualified for the 2012 Summer Olympics.

At the 2012 Olympics (results) he beat Christian Donfack Adjoufack from Cameroon then lost to Algerian Abdelhafid Benchabla 9–12.

=== World Series of Boxing ===
From 2010 onwards Kölling participated in the AIBA organised "World Series of Boxing". In the 2010 series, he was part of the "Istanbulls" team. In this competition, he competed in the 85 kg weight division (a weight division created for the World Series of Boxing), winning 4 fights out of 5.

In 2011, he switched teams to compete for the "Leipzig Leopards". In the second season, he won 3 fights.

== Professional career ==
After the 2012 Summer Olympics, Kölling switched to the professional ranks. In the same year, he made his professional debut.

In 2013, he won all 8 of his professional fights, including his first professional fight outside Germany, in London at the O2 Arena.

=== Koelling vs. Aduashvili ===
He won his first professional title in 2014, beating Paata Aduashvili to win the vacant WBO Youth Light Heavyweight Title.

In the same year, he fought in 7 more fights, winning all of them. One of these fights lead to Kölling winning his first senior professional title, when he beat French boxer Patrick Bois to win the WBA intercontinental title in June 2014. He defended his title against Giuseppe Brischetto in August 2014, before losing it to Mirco Ricci in February 2015. The loss to Ricci was his first defeat in 16 professional fights. In 2014 he competed in another 4 fights, winning all of them.

In April 2016, he won the vacant WBA intercontinental title by defeating the Ukrainian boxer Oleksandr Cherviak. He defended his title in October 2016 against South African Ryno Liebenberg. The return fight against Liebenberg in February 2017, held at Emperors Palace in Kempton Park, was Kölling's first match outside of Germany since 2013. The second victory over Liebenberg meant that Kölling had won 23 professional fights out of 24.

=== Koelling vs. Beterbiev ===
Following on from this, he fought Artur Beterbiev at the Save Mart Arena in Fresno, California for the vacant IBF World Light-Heavyweight title. Beterbiev was ranked #2 by the IBF at the time, while Koelling was ranked at #3. Beterbiev won the fight in the 12th round by knock out.

2018 began with a win for Kölling, beating fellow German Robert Müller with a TKO in January. He then beat Giorgi Beroshvili by knock out in March 2018. In June 2018, he beat the Latvian Andrejs Pokumeiko.

=== Koelling vs. Boesel ===
In recognition of his performances, he fought Dominic Bösel for the EBU European Light Heavyweight title. Kölling lost to Bösel in a points decision, 111–118, 113-116 and 113–115 on the scorecards.

== Professional boxing record ==
34 fights	29 wins	5 losses
By knockout	9	2
By decision	20	3

No.	Result	Record	Opponent	Type	Round, time	Date	Location	Notes
34	Win	29-5	(Azerbaijan) Ali Ismayilov	TKO	10	1 Jul 2023	Sportforum, Bernau bei Berlin, Germany	
33	Loss	28-5	(Poland) Michał Cieślak	TKO	1 (10), 2:00	1 Oct 2022	Hala Legionów, Kielce, Poland	
32	Win	28–4	(Germany) Leon Harth	MD	10	12 Nov 2021	Lokschuppen, Bielefeld, Germany	For WBO European Cruiserweight Title
31	Win	27–4	(Bosnia and Herzegovina) Slavisa Simeunovic	RTD	2 (8), 3:00	21 May 2021	Hyatt Regency Hotel, Belgrade, Serbia	
30	Loss	26–4	(Germany) Leon Bunn	UD	12	2 Nov 2019	Conlog Arena, Koblenz, Germany	For IBF International light-heavyweight title
29	Loss	26–3	(Germany) Dominic Boesel	UD	12	27 Oct 2018	Stadthalle, Weissenfels, Germany	For European light-heavyweight title
28	Win	26–2	(Latvia) Andrejs Pokumeiko	UD	8	9 Jun 2018	Kohlrabizirkus, Leipzig, Germany	
27	Win	25–2	(Georgia (country)) Giorgi Beroshvili	KO	1 (8), 2:07	3 Mar 2018	Stadthalle, Weissenfels, Germany	
26	Win	24–2	(Germany) Robert Mueller	TKO	2 (6), 1:26	20 Jan 2018	P1 Boxgym, Berlin, Germany	
25	Loss	23–2	(Russia) Artur Beterbiev	KO	12 (12), 2:33	11 Nov 2017	(United States) Save Mart Arena, Fresno, California, US	For vacant IBF light-heavyweight title
24	Win	23–1	(South Africa) Ryno Liebenberg	UD	10	4 Feb 2017	Emperors Palace, Kempton Park, South Africa	
23	Win	22–1	(South Africa) Ryno Liebenberg	SD	12	1 Oct 2016	Jahnsportforum, Neubrandenburg, Germany	Retained WBA Inter-Continental light-heavyweight title
22	Win	21–1	(Ukraine) Oleksandr Cherviak	UD	12	9 Apr 2016	MBS Arena, Potsdam, Germany	Won vacant WBA Inter-Continental light-heavyweight title
21	Win	20–1	(Ukraine) Serhiy Demchenko	UD	8	5 Dec 2015	Inselparkhalle, Wilhelmsburg, Germany	
20	Win	19–1	(Czech Republic) Karel Horejsek	UD	8	17 Oct 2015	DM Arena, Karlsruhe, Germany	
19	Win	18–1	(Ukraine) Vasyl Kondor	UD	8	18 Jul 2015	Gerry Weber Stadium, Halle, Germany	
18	Win	17–1	(Germany) Andrej Maurer	UD	8	25 Apr 2015	Columbiahalle, Berlin, Germany	
17	Loss	16–1	(Italy) Mirco Ricci	UD	12	21 Feb 2015	O2 World Arena, Berlin, Germany	Lost WBA Inter-Continental light-heavyweight title
16	Win	16–0	(Hungary) Daniel Regi	TKO	6 (8), 1:00	27 Sep 2014	Sparkassen-Arena, Kiel, Germany	
15	Win	15–0	(Italy) Giuseppe Brischetto	RTD	7 (12), 3:00	30 Aug 2014	Gerry Weber Stadium, Halle, Germany	Retained WBA Inter-Continental light-heavyweight title
14	Win	14–0	(France) Patrick Bois	UD	12	7 Jun 2014	Sport and Congress Centre, Schwerin, Germany	Won vacant WBA Inter-Continental light-heavyweight title
13	Win	13–0	(Croatia) Mirzet Bajrektarevic	UD	8	5 Apr 2014	Stadthalle, Rostock, Germany	
12	Win	12–0	(Georgia (country)) Paata Aduashvili	TKO	3 (10), 2:08	25 Jan 2014	Hanns-Martin-Schleyer Halle, Stuttgart, Germany	For vacant WBO Youth light-heavyweight title
11	Win	11–0	(Czech Republic) Tomas Adamek	UD	8	13 Dec 2013	Jahnsportforum, Neubrandenburg, Germany	
10	Win	10–0	(Hungary) Gyorgy Marosi	KO	3 (8), 0:41	26 Oct 2013	EWE-arena, Oldenburg, Germany	
9	Win	9–0	(Austria) Haris Causevic	TKO	3 (8), 0:19	24 Aug 2013	Sport and Congress Centre, Schwerin, Germany	
8	Win	8–0	(Germany) Armin Dollinger	RTD	4 (8), 3:00	8 Jun 2013	Max-Schmeling-Halle, Berlin, Germany	
7	Win	7–0	(Lithuania) Vygaudas Laurinkus	PTS	4	25 May 2013	(United Kingdom) O2 Arena, London, England	
6	Win	6–0	(Germany) Leo Tchoula	UD	8	27 Apr 2013	Alsterdorfer Sporthalle, Hamburg, Germany	
5	Win	5–0	(Czech Republic) Josef Obeslo	UD	6	23 Mar 2013	GETEC Arena, Magdeburg, Germany	
4	Win	4–0	(Lithuania) Egidijus Kakstys	UD	6	2 Feb 2013	Max-Schmeling-Halle, Berlin, Germany	
3	Win	3–0	(Hungary) Attila Baran	UD	6	15 Dec 2012	Nuremberg Arena, Nuremberg, Germany	
2	Win	2–0	(Russia) Ivan Maslov	UD	6	3 Nov 2012	Gerry Weber Stadium, Halle, Germany	
1	Win	1–0	(Argentina) Pablo Sosa	UD	6	29 Sep 2012	Alsterdorfer Sporthalle, Hamburg, Germany	

== Personal life ==
Kölling is interested in football and supports Hertha Berlin.

== See also ==
- 2008 Youth World Amateur Boxing Championships
- 2011 World Amateur Boxing Championships
