= Mazion (surname) =

Mazion is a surname. Notable people with the surname include:

- Rodney Mazion (born 1971), American football player
- Travell Mazion (1995–2020), American boxer
