= Frank Buglioni =

British boxer (born 1989)

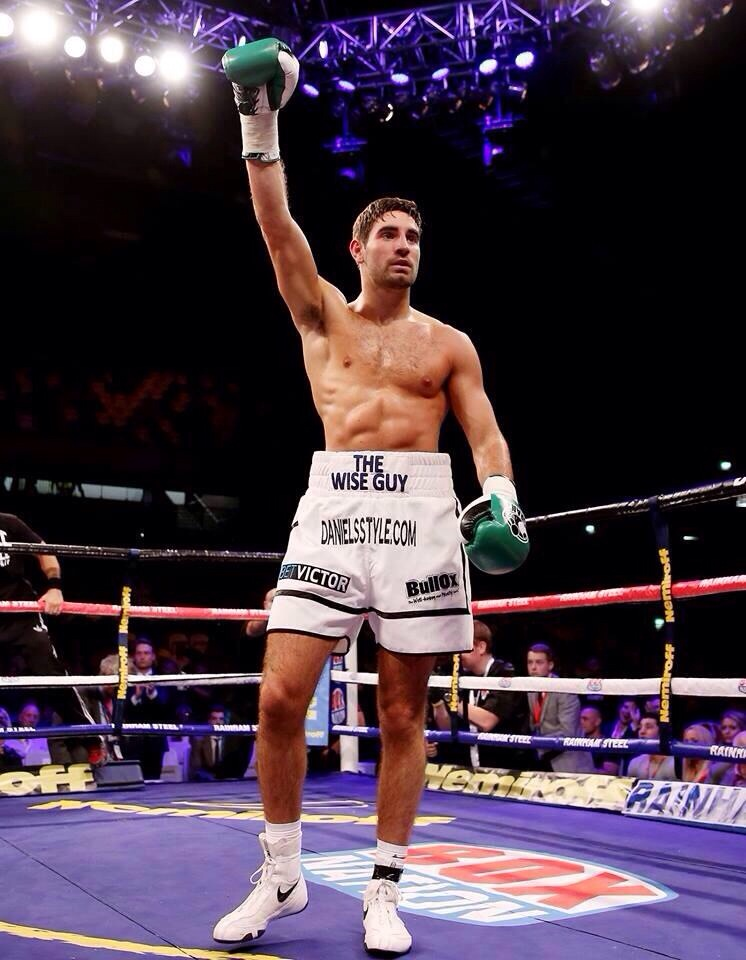

Personal information
- Nickname: The Wise Guy
- Nationality: British
- Born: 18 April 1989 (age 37) Enfield, London, England
- Height: 6 ft 1 in (185 cm)
- Weight: Super-middleweight; Light-heavyweight

Boxing career
- Reach: 72 in (183 cm)
- Stance: Orthodox

Boxing record
- Total fights: 27
- Wins: 22
- Win by KO: 16
- Losses: 4
- Draws: 1

Frank Buglioni (born 18 April 1989) is a British former professional boxer who competed from 2011 to 2018. He challenged once for the WBA super-middleweight title in 2015. At regional level, he held the British light-heavyweight title from 2016 to 2018, and challenged once for the Commonwealth light-heavyweight title in 2018.

== Amateur career ==
Buglioni took up boxing at the age of 14 to increase his fitness and strength, his priority at the time being football. Buglioni joined the Waltham Forest Amateur Boxing Club, and after winning his first four fights it was decided that he would move on to train at the Repton Boxing Club in Bethnal Green under the tutelage of head coach Tony Burns.

Buglioni went on to have 70 amateur fights, winning 60 and losing 10, with over half of his wins by knockout. He won two national titles and also picked up various medals, whilst representing his country in international tournaments, including a silver medal against the world number one Vijender Singh in the Commonwealth Federations Tournament in Delhi in 2010.

Buglioni was selected to train with the Great Britain Olympic team in 2010. However, the following year he decided to turn professional.

== Professional career ==
Nicknamed "The Wise Guy", Buglioni made his professional debut in November 2011, stopping Sabie Montieth in the first round. He won his first 10 fights before stopping Stepan Horvath in the eighth round in November 2013 to win the WBO European super middleweight title. He successfully defended the title three months later against Gaetano Nespro, but lost it in April 2014 when he was stopped by Sergey Khomitsky.

Three months later he stopped Sam Couzens in four rounds to win the vacant BBBofC Southern Area super middleweight title. In November he regained the WBO European title with a unanimous decision over the previously unbeaten Andrew Robinson. He made two further defences (a first round stoppage of Ivan Jukic and a draw with Lee Markham) before beating Fernando Castaneda in July 2015 to take the vacant WBA International super middleweight title.

In September 2015 he challenged for Fedor Chudinov's WBA World super middleweight title at Wembley Arena; The fight went the full 12 rounds with Chudinov winning comfortably on points.

In 2016, Buglioni moved up to light heavyweight, stopping journeyman Olegs Fedotovs in the first round in March.

On 10 December 2016, on the undercard of Anthony Joshua vs. Éric Molina, Buglioni fought Hosea Burton in a tightly contested 12 round affair. With Buglioni down on the scorecards going into the 12th he produced a stunning knockout to get the win catapulting himself forwards in the rankings. It was one of the fights of 2016.

Buglioni was trained by Mark Tibbs at the TRAD TKO Boxing Gym in Canning Town, before moving on to work with the Irish boxing brothers Paschal Collins and former world champion Steve Collins at the Celtic Warrior Boxing Gym in Dublin, Ireland. In 2016, he moved on to new trainer Don Charles.

In his first defence of the British light heavyweight title, Buglioni faced Ricky Summers. Summers held his own, but in the end Buglioni was too much for Summers and won the contest on points.

In his next fight, Buglioni was slated to battle undefeated Callum Johnson. Johnson, however, dropped shortly before the fight. He was replaced by another undefeated Brit, Craig Richards. Buglioni managed to secure the win via unanimous decision.

On 24 March 2018, Buglioni and Callum Johnson finally squared of in the ring, in a bid for both the British and the Commonwealth light heavyweight titles. Johnson knocked Buglioni down and managed to finish him via TKO in the first round.

On 24 November 2018, Frank fought Fanlong Meng from China, who was undefeated and was ranked #11 by the IBF. In the early rounds, Buglioni was struggling to connect on the savvy defensive Meng. As the action went on, Buglioni suffered a cut above his right eye and the doctor called for a break to take a look at the cut. The fight was initially resumed, however, the cut grew only worse, and the doctor was forced to stop the fight with 1:58 to go in the fifth round.

Two days after the fight, Buglioni announced that at the age of 29, he is officially retiring from boxing. "After thoughtful deliberation; I have decided to hang up the gloves. I am proud of all my achievements in boxing and I will be forever grateful of the life lessons and positive effects it has given me." - said Buglioni as a part of his official statement.

== Personal life ==
Buglioni has Italian heritage and can trace his roots to Naples. His great grandfather emigrated to London in the 1920s. He was born and raised in Enfield, London where he still resides between training camps.

After achieving his International Baccalaureate Diploma from Highlands School, Buglioni attended the University of Westminster to study building surveying. He chose to put his education on hold when he was selected for the GB Olympic team. Buglioni has said he would like to go back and complete his degree.

Buglioni's boxing heroes are Oscar De La Hoya and Arturo "Thunder" Gatti.

Before Buglioni took up boxing full-time, he worked as a building surveyor. He supports London football team Chelsea F.C.

== Professional boxing record ==
27 fights	22 wins	4 losses
By knockout	16	3
By decision	6	1
Draws	1	

No.	Result	Record	Opponent	Type	Round, time	Date	Location	Notes
27	Loss	22–4–1	Meng Fanlong	TKO	5 (12), 1:58	24 Nov 2018	Casino de Monte Carlo Salle Medecin, Monte Carlo, Monaco	For IBF Inter-Continental light-heavyweight title
26	Win	22–3–1	Emmanuel Feuzeu	RTD	6 (8), 3:00	28 Jul 2018	The O2 Arena, London, England	
25	Loss	21–3–1	Callum Johnson	TKO	1 (12), 1:31	24 Mar 2018	The O2 Arena, London, England	Lost British light-heavyweight title; For Commonwealth light-heavyweight title
24	Win	21–2–1	Craig Richards	UD	12	28 Oct 2017	Millennium Stadium, Cardiff, Wales	Retained British light-heavyweight title
23	Win	20–2–1	Ricky Summers	UD	12	1 Jul 2017	The O2 Arena, London, England	Retained British light-heavyweight title
22	Win	19–2–1	Hosea Burton	TKO	12 (12), 1:56	10 Dec 2016	Manchester Arena, Manchester, England	Won British light-heavyweight title
21	Win	18–2–1	Olegs Fedotovs	TKO	1 (6), 1:40	26 Mar 2016	Wembley Arena, London, England	
20	Loss	17–2–1	Fedor Chudinov	UD	12	26 Sep 2015	Wembley Arena, London, England	For WBA (Regular) super-middleweight title
19	Win	17–1–1	Fernando Castañeda	KO	5 (12), 2:26	24 Jul 2015	Wembley Arena, London, England	Won vacant WBA Inter-Continental super-middleweight title
18	Draw	16–1–1	Lee Markham	SD	10	9 May 2015	Wembley Arena, London, England	Retained WBO European super-middleweight title
17	Win	16–1	Ivan Jukic	TKO	1 (10), 1:25	28 Feb 2015	O2 Arena, London, England	Retained WBO European super-middleweight title
16	Win	15–1	Andrew Robinson	UD	10	29 Nov 2014	ExCeL Arena, London, England	Won vacant WBO European super-middleweight title
15	Win	14–1	Alexey Ribchev	TKO	6 (10), 2:11	20 Sep 2014	York Hall, London, England	
14	Win	13–1	Sam Couzens	TKO	4 (10), 2:24	16 Jul 2014	York Hall, London, England	Won vacant Southern Area super-middleweight title
13	Loss	12–1	Sergey Khomitsky	TKO	6 (10), 1:04	12 Apr 2014	Copper Box, London, England	Lost WBO European super-middleweight title
12	Win	12–0	Gaetano Nespro	TKO	5 (10), 2:24	15 Feb 2014	Copper Box, London, England	Retained WBO European super-middleweight title
11	Win	11–0	Štěpán Horváth	KO	8 (10), 2:53	30 Nov 2013	Copper Box, London, England	Won vacant WBO European super-middleweight title
10	Win	10–0	Broislav Kubin	TKO	2 (10), 1:19	21 Sep 2013	Copper Box, London, England	
9	Win	9–0	Kirill Psonko	UD	8	20 Jul 2013	Wembley Arena, London, England	
8	Win	8–0	Darren McKenna	TKO	3 (8), 1:36	20 Apr 2013	Wembley Arena, London, England	
7	Win	7–0	Ciaran Healy	RTD	2 (6), 3:00	15 Dec 2012	ExCeL Arena, London, England	
6	Win	6–0	Joe Rea	TKO	2 (6), 1:24	14 Sep 2012	York Hall, London, England	
5	Win	5–0	Jody Meikle	UD	6	1 Jun 2012	York Hall, London, England	
4	Win	4–0	Daniel Borisov	TKO	1 (6), 2:48	28 Apr 2012	Royal Albert Hall, London, England	
3	Win	3–0	Ryan Clark	UD	4	10 Feb 2012	York Hall, London, England	
2	Win	2–0	Paul Morby	TKO	1 (4), 2:37	18 Nov 2011	York Hall, London, England	
1	Win	1–0	Sabie Montieth	TKO	1 (4), 2:04	5 Nov 2011	Wembley Arena, London, England	

Sporting positions
Regional boxing titles
Vacant Title last held by Geard Ajetovic	WBO European super-middleweight champion 30 November 2013 – April 2014	Succeeded by Siarhei Kamitski
Vacant Title last held by Kelvin Young	Southern Area super-middleweight champion 16 July 2014 – March 2015	Vacant Title next held by Tom Baker
Vacant Title last held by Siarhei Kamitski	WBO European super-middleweight champion 29 November 2014 – July 2015	Vacant Title next held by Jamie Cox
Vacant Title last held by Patrick Nielsen	WBA International super-middleweight champion 24 July 2015 – April 2016	Vacant Title next held by George Groves
Preceded by Hosea Burton	British light-heavyweight champion 10 December 2016 – 24 March 2018	Succeeded by Callum Johnson
