= Artur Mann =

Kazakh-German boxer (born 1990)

Artur Mann Артур Манн
Personal information
- Nickname: Thunder
- Born: Artur Fedorovich Mann; 11 October 1990 (age 35) Kurayli, Kazakh SSR, Soviet Union (now Kurayli, Kazakhstan)
- Height: 6 ft 1 in (185 cm)
- Weight: Cruiserweight

Boxing career
- Reach: N/A
- Stance: Orthodox

Boxing record
- Total fights: 27
- Wins: 25
- Win by KO: 13
- Losses: 5
- Draws: 0
- No contests: 0

Artur Fedorovich Mann (Cyrillic: Артур Федорович Манн; born 11 October 1990) is a Kazakh-German professional boxer.

== Professional career ==
Mann made his professional debut on 2 May 2015, against Marko Angermann. Mann won the fight via a second-round TKO.

After accumulating a career record of 4–0, he faced Phillip Palm on 9 January 2016, on the undercard of Vincent Feigenbutz vs. Giovanni De Carolis II. Mann won the fight via a fifth-round TKO.

After a win over Björn Blaschke, he faced Valery Brudov on 7 May 2016, on the undercard of Kubrat Pulev vs. Derek Chisora. Mann won the fight via unanimous decision.

After another three fights, he faced Leon Harth on 8 July 2017, for the vacant WBO International cruiserweight title. Mann won the fight via unanimous decision, winning his first career championship.

After two fights, he faced Alexander Peil on 2 June 2018, in his first title defesne. Mann won the fight via a Unanimous Decision, retaining his championship.

His next fight came on 10 November 2018, against Alexey Zubov. Mann won the fight via a unanimous decision.

His next fight came on 16 March 2019, against Kevin Lerena for the IBO cruiserweight title. Mann lost the fight via a fourth-round TKO, suffering his first career defeat.

After a two fight win streak, he faced Mairis Briedis on 16 October 2021, for his IBF and The Ring cruiserweight titles. Mann lost the fight via a third-round TKO.

Following his loss to Briedis, he faced Nikodem Jeżewski on 19 February 2022, for the vacant IBO Inter-Continental cruiserweight title. Mann won the fight via unanimous decision, winning his second career championship. This bout went viral after the first stanza of the German national anthem, which is not part of the official anthem and is usually avoided due to its associations with the Nazi era, was played before the fight.

After a win over Amine Boucetta, he faced Evgeny Tishchenko on 11 December 2022. Mann lost the fight via unanimous decision.

After going on a two fight win streak, he faced Muslim Gadzhimagomedov on 9 December 2023. Mann lost the fight via an eighth-round corner retirement.

After a win over Levani Lukhutashvili, Mann faced Ion Mihai Desrobitu on 2 November 2024, for the vacant WBF cruiserweight title. Mann won the fight via a seventh-round knockout.

His next fight came on 18 April 2025, against Sergey Kovalev for the vacant IBA Pro Intercontinental cruiserweight title. Mann lost the fight via a seventh-round TKO.

He was scheduled to face Mateusz Masternak on 4 October 2025, for the vacant EBU cruiserweight title, but withdrew a month prior due to injury, and was replaced by Joel Tambwe Djeko.

He returned to the ring on 7 February 2026, where he faced Gregory Garcia for the vacant WBF bridgerweight title. Mann won the fight via a first-round knockout, winning his fourth career championship.

His next fight came on 17 April 2026, against the undefeated Artem Suslenkov for Suslenkov's WBA Continental Gold heavyweight title. Mann lost the fight via a third-round TKO.

== Professional boxing record ==
29 fights	23 wins	6 losses
By knockout	14	5
By decision	9	1

No.	Result	Record	Opponent	Type	Round, time	Date	Location	Notes
29	Loss	23–6	Artem Suslenkov	TKO	3 (10), 2:28	17 Apr 2026	Nadezhda Sport Palace, Serpukhov, Russia	For WBA Continental Gold heavyweight title
28	Win	23–5	Gregory Garcia	KO	1 (12), 1:30	7 Feb 2026	Schilde-Halle, Bad Hersfeld, Germany	Won vacant WBF bridgerweight title
27	Loss	22–5	Sergey Kovalev	TKO	7 (10), 0:49	18 Apr 2025	Yunost Sport Palace, Chelyabinsk, Russia	For vacant IBA Pro Intercontinental cruiserweight title
26	Win	22–4	Ion Mihai Desrobitu	KO	7 (12), 2:20	2 Nov 2024	Schilde-Halle, Bad Hersfeld, Germany	Won vacant WBF cruiserweight title
25	Win	21–4	Levani Lukhutashvili	KO	2 (8), 1:31	8 Jun 2024	Power House Box Gym, Hannover, Germany	
24	Loss	20–4	Muslim Gadzhimagomedov	RTD	8 (10), 3:00	9 Dec 2023	The Agenda, Dubai, United Arab Emirates	
23	Win	20–3	Stephane Tchamba	KO	1 (8), 0:57	3 June 2023	Stadthalle, Eberbach, Germany	
22	Loss	19–3	Evgeny Tishchenko	UD	10	11 Dec 2022	DIVS, Yekaterinburg, Russia	
21	Win	19–2	Amine Boucetta	TKO	4 (8), 1:10	30 Sep 2022	CK Eventcenter, Bergkamen, Germany	
20	Win	18–2	Nikodem Jeżewski	UD	10	19 Feb 2022	Hala Orbita, Wrocław, Poland	Won vacant IBO Inter-Continental cruiserweight title
19	Loss	17–2	Mairis Briedis	TKO	3 (12), 1:57	16 Oct 2021	Arēna Rīga, Riga, Latvia	For IBF and The Ring cruiserweight titles
18	Win	17–1	Rad Rashid	KO	3 (8), 0:39	12 Jun 2020	Havelstudios, Charlottenburg, Germany	
17	Win	16–1	Soso Abuladze	UD	8	12 Oct 2019	Halle Westand, Braunschweig, Germany	
16	Loss	15–1	Kevin Lerena	TKO	4 (12), 2:37	16 Mar 2019	Emporors Palace, Kempton Park, South Africa	For IBO cruiserweight title
15	Win	15–0	Alexey Zubov	UD	10	10 Nov 2018	UIC Pavilion, Chicago, Illinois, U.S.	
14	Win	14–0	Alexander Peil	UD	12	2 Jun 2018	Stadionsporthalle, Hannover, Germany	Retained WBO International cruiserweight title
13	Win	13–0	Laszlo Ivanyi	TKO	4 (6), 1:10	8 Apr 2018	Grosse Freiheit 36, St. Pauli, Germany	
12	Win	12–0	Isossa Mondo	UD	6	27 Oct 2017	Sport and Congress Center, Schwerin, Germany	
11	Win	11–0	Leon Harth	MD	10	8 Jul 2017	Friedrich-Ebert-Halle, Ludwigshafen, Germany	Won vacant WBO International cruiserweight title
10	Win	10–0	Taras Oleksiyenko	UD	8	25 Mar 2017	MBS Arena, Potsdam, Germany	
9	Win	9–0	Adam Gadajew	TKO	5 (8), 2:23	5 Nov 2016	MBS Arena, Potsdam, Germany	
8	Win	8–0	Pavelas Nevedomskis	UD	8	1 Oct 2016	Jahnsportforum, Neubrandenburg, Germany	
7	Win	7–0	Valery Brudov	UD	8	7 May 2016	Barclaycard Arena, Hamburg, Germany	
6	Win	6–0	Björn Blaschke	KO	4 (8), 2:00	12 Mar 2016	Jahnsportforum, Neubrandenburg, Germany	
5	Win	5–0	Phillip Palm	TKO	5 (6), 2:55	9 Jan 2016	Baden-Arena, Offenburg, Germany	
4	Win	4–0	Radek Geissmann	TKO	1 (6), 2:05	24 Oct 2015	Inselhalle, Eisenhüttenstadt, Germany	
3	Win	3–0	Krzysztof Chochel	KO	1 (6), 1:00	12 Sep 2015	Open Air, Köpenick, Germany	
2	Win	2–0	Marcel Erler	RTD	3 (4), 3:00	11 Jul 2015	Landkostarena, Bestensee, Germany	
1	Win	1–0	Marko Angermann	TKO	2 (4), 2:59	2 May 2015	Trainingszentrum, Berlin, Germany	
