= Giovanni De Carolis =

Italian boxer (born 1984)

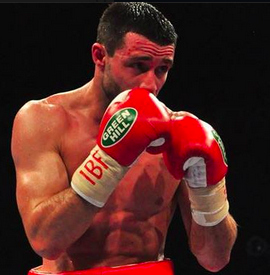

Personal information
- Born: 21 August 1984 (age 42) Rome, Lazio, Italy
- Height: 6 ft 0 1/2 in (184 cm)
- Weight: Middleweight; Super-middleweight

Boxing career
- Stance: Orthodox

Boxing record
- Total fights: 45
- Wins: 33
- Win by KO: 16
- Losses: 11
- Draws: 1

Giovanni De Carolis (born 21 August 1984) is an Italian retired professional boxer who held the WBA super-middleweight title in 2016.

== Professional career ==
De Carolis made his professional debut on 17 November 2007, scoring a second-round stoppage over Marian Tomcany. On 14 June 2008, De Carolis fought outside of his native Italy for the first time, travelling to Ukraine and suffering his first defeat against then-reigning IBF Youth middleweight champion Max Bursak, who stopped him in eight rounds. De Carolis' first opportunity at a major regional championship came on 30 January 2010, for the vacant European Union super-middleweight title. He lost a twelve-round majority decision to Lolenga Mock.

=== De Carolis vs. Feigenbutz ===
On 17 October 2015, De Carolis inched closer to a major world title when he fought Vincent Feigenbutz for the WBA interim super-middleweight title. Feigenbutz won a close unanimous decision with judges' scores of 115–113, 115–113 and 114–113, but the result was seen by some observers as controversial.

=== De Carolis vs. Feigenbutz II ===
A rematch took place on 9 January 2016, with De Carolis avenging his defeat by winning the WBA (Regular) super-middleweight title.

=== De Carlolis vs. Zeuge ===
On 23 July 2016, De Carolis fought Tyron Zeuge for the second time in a row but lost the fight via knockout in the final round.

=== De Carolis vs. Richards ===
O n 15 May 2021, Lerrone Richards beat De Carolis by unanimous decision in their 12 round contest. Richards was ranked #10 by the WBO at super middleweight. The scorecards read 119-109, 120-108, 120-108 in favor of Richards.

=== De Carolis vs. Scardina ===
On 13 May 2022, De Carolis beat Daniele Scardina by technical knockout in the 5th round. Scardina was ranked #8 by the IBF and #9 by the WBO at super middleweight at the time.

=== Retirement ===
De Carolis announced his retirement from professional boxing in October 2024.

== Professional boxing record ==
45 fights	33 wins	11 losses
By knockout	16	3
By decision	17	8
Draws	1	

No.	Result	Record	Opponent	Type	Round, time	Date	Location	Notes
45	Loss	33–11–1	Kévin Lele Sadjo	TKO	8 (12), 2:21	09 Mar 2024	Palais des sports Marcel-Cerdan, Levallois-Perret, France	For European super-middleweight title
44	Win	33–10–1	Douglas Ataide	UD	10	01 Jul 2023	Palafiljkam, Ostia, Italy	
43	Win	32–10–1	Bosko Misic	KO	3 (6)	14 Apr 2023	Klingentalturnhalle, Basel, Switzerland	
42	Win	31–10–1	Daniele Scardina	TKO	5 (10), 0:50	13 May 2022	Allianz Cloud, Milan, Italy	Won WBO Inter-Continental super-middleweight title
41	Win	30–10–1	Giorgi Abramishvili	RTD	1 (6), 3:00	19 Mar 2022	Palasport S. Allende, Cinisello Balsamo, Italy	
40	Win	29–10–1	Ignazio Crivello	PTS	6	2 Oct 2021	Stadio Tre Torri, Rome, Italy	
39	Loss	28–10–1	Lerrone Richards	UD	12	15 May 2021	AO Arena, Manchester, England	For vacant European super-middleweight title
38	Win	28–9–1	Khoren Gevor	UD	12	21 Jun 2019	Parco della Pace, Rome, Italy	Retained WBC International super-middleweight title
37	Win	27–9–1	Dragan Lepei	UD	12	14 Dec 2018	Cinecittà, Rome, Italy	Won vacant WBC International super-middleweight title
36	Win	26–9–1	Roberto Cocco	UD	10	28 Jul 2018	Stadio del baseball, Rome, Italy	Won vacant Italy super-middleweight title
35	Loss	25–9–1	Bilal Akkawy	UD	10	24 Feb 2018	Club Punchbowl, Sydney, Australia	For WBA Oceania super-middleweight title
34	Win	25–8–1	Bojan Radovic	KO	2 (6), 1:12	19 Jan 2018	Palazzetto dello Sport, Nepi, Italy	
33	Loss	24–8–1	Viktor Polyakov	UD	12	24 Jul 2017	Foro Italico, Rome, Italy	For vacant WBA International super-middleweight title
32	Loss	24–7–1	Tyron Zeuge	TKO	12 (12), 2:41	5 Nov 2016	MBS Arena, Potsdam, Germany	Lost WBA and GBU super-middleweight titles
31	Draw	24–6–1	Tyron Zeuge	MD	12	23 Jul 2016	Max-Schmeling-Halle, Berlin, Germany	Retained WBA (Regular) and GBU super-middleweight titles
30	Win	24–6	Vincent Feigenbutz	TKO	11 (12), 0:32	9 Jan 2016	Baden-Arena, Offenburg, Germany	Won WBA (Regular) and GBU super-middleweight titles
29	Loss	23–6	Vincent Feigenbutz	UD	12	17 Oct 2015	Dm-Arena, Karlsruhe, Germany	For GBU and WBA interim super-middleweight titles
28	Win	23–5	Mouhamed Ali Ndiaye	UD	12	2 May 2015	Palazzetto dello Sport, Rome, Italy	Retained IBF Inter-Continental super-middleweight title
27	Win	22–5	Geard Ajetovic	UD	12	1 Nov 2014	Palaolgiata, Rome, Italy	Won vacant IBF Inter-Continental super-middleweight title
26	Win	21–5	Ivan Stupalo	KO	4 (6)	28 Mar 2014	Palazzetto dello Sport, Nepi, Italy	
25	Loss	20–5	Arthur Abraham	UD	12	26 Oct 2013	Large EWE Arena, Oldenburg, Germany	For WBO Inter-Continental super-middleweight title
24	Win	20–4	Artem Solomko	RTD	4 (8), 3:00	9 Mar 2013	Palazzetto dello Sport, Civitavecchia, Italy	
23	Win	19–4	Zoltan Kiss Jr.	TKO	1 (8), 2:07	18 Jan 2013	Centro Sportivo Tor di Quinto, Rome, Italy	
22	Win	18–4	Roman Shkarupa	SD	12	28 Sep 2012	Centro Sportivo Tor di Quinto, Rome, Italy	Won vacant WBC International super-middleweight title
21	Win	17–4	Attila Baran	TKO	8 (12)	29 Jun 2012	Palazzetto dello Sport S. Pertini, Fiano Romano, Italy	Retained WBC Mediterranean super-middleweight title
20	Win	16–4	Jozsef Molnar	KO	1 (6)	13 Apr 2012	Palazzetto dello Sport Concetto Lo Bello, Syracuse, Italy	
19	Win	15–4	Blas Miguel Martinez	KO	3 (12)	20 Jan 2012	PalaCesaroni, Genzano di Roma, Italy	Won vacant WBC Mediterranean super-middleweight title
18	Win	14–4	Titusz Szabo	TKO	2 (6)	16 Dec 2011	Ariccia, Italy	
17	Win	13–4	Sandor Ramocsa	PTS	6	6 May 2011	Palazzetto dello Sport, Fiano Romano, Italy	
16	Loss	12–4	Matteo Signani	UD	10	5 Nov 2010	Carisport, Cesena, Italy	For Italy middleweight title
15	Win	12–3	Balint Biczo	KO	2 (6), 2:52	19 Jun 2010	PalaCollodi, Albano Laziale, Italy	
14	Loss	11–3	Lolenga Mock	MD	12	30 Jan 2010	NRGi Arena, Aarhus, Denmark	For vacant European Union super-middleweight title
13	Win	11–2	Sandor Ramocsa	PTS	8	5 Dec 2009	Palamunicipio Roma XI, Rome, Italy	
12	Loss	10–2	Gaetano Nespro	SD	10	20 Jun 2009	Villa comunale, Cecchina, Italy	For Italy middleweight title
11	Win	10–1	Mugurel Sebe	PTS	6	20 Mar 2009	Palaboxe Diego Solito, Latina, Italy	
10	Win	9–1	Michael Recloux	PTS	10	23 Dec 2008	Pala Bianchini, Latina, Italy	Won vacant WBF (Foundation) International middleweight title
9	Win	8–1	Karoly Domokos	PTS	6	28 Nov 2008	Palaboxe Diego Solito, Latina, Italy	
8	Win	7–1	Gyula Gaspar	KO	4 (6)	17 Oct 2008	Palaboxe Diego Solito, Latina, Italy	
7	Loss	6–1	Max Bursak	TKO	8 (10)	14 Jun 2008	Palace of Sports, Kyiv, Ukraine	For IBF Youth middleweight title
6	Win	6–0	Janos Petrovics	PTS	6	25 Apr 2008	Palasport, Pontinia, Italy	
5	Win	5–0	Eugen Stan	PTS	6	29 Mar 2008	Sezze, Italy	
4	Win	4–0	Rastislav Frano	TKO	2 (6)	29 Feb 2008	Palaboxe Diego Solito, Latina, Italy	
3	Win	3–0	Lubo Hantak	PTS	6	22 Dec 2007	Palestra ITIS Marconi, Latina, Italy	
2	Win	2–0	Joseph Sovijus	PTS	6	7 Dec 2007	Padiglione dello Sport, Ostia, Italy	
1	Win	1–0	Marian Tomcany	TKO	2 (6)	17 Nov 2007	Palestra ITIS Marconi, Latina, Italy	

Sporting positions
Regional boxing titles
Vacant Title last held by Garry Comer	WBF (Foundation) International middleweight champion 23 December 2008 – January 2010; Vacated	Vacant Title next held by Semir Bajrovic
Vacant Title last held by Vilmos Balog	WBC Mediterranean super-middleweight champion 20 January 2012 – 28 September 2012; Won International title	Vacant Title next held by Jorge Silva
Vacant Title last held by Nikola Sjekloća	WBC International super-middleweight champion 28 September 2012 – October 2013; Vacated	Vacant Title next held by Callum Smith
Vacant Title last held by Ünsal Arik	IBF Inter-Continental super-middleweight champion 1 November 2014 – October 2015; Vacated	Vacant Title next held by Vincent Feigenbutz
Vacant Title last held by Avni Yıldırım	WBC International super-middleweight champion 14 December 2018 – 7 March 2020	Vacant
Minor world boxing titles
Preceded by Vincent Feigenbutz	GBU super-middleweight champion 9 January 2016 – 5 November 2016	Succeeded by Tyron Zeuge
Major world boxing titles
Vacant Title last held by Fedor Chudinov	WBA (Regular) super middleweight champion 9 January 2016 – 5 October 2016; Promoted	Vacant Title next held by Tyron Zeuge
Vacant Title last held by Felix Sturm	WBA super-middleweight champion 5 October 2016 – 5 November 2016	Succeeded by Tyron Zeuge
