= Wilkens Mathieu =

Canadian boxer (born 2005)

Personal information
- Nationality: Canadian
- Born: 4 January 2005 (age 21) Quebec City, Canada
- Height: 6 ft 1 in (185 cm)
- Weight: Super-middleweight

Boxing career
- Stance: Orthodox

Boxing record
- Total fights: 17
- Wins: 17
- Win by KO: 11

Wilkens Mathieu (born 4 January 2005) is a Canadian professional boxer. He has held the NABF super-middleweight title since October 2025.

== Amateur career ==
Following in the footsteps of his older brother Lexson, Mathieu started boxing at the age of 10. He was victorious in five golden glove competitions and also claimed the Canadian Junior Championship at 75 kg. He finished his amateur career with a record of 30 wins and two losses.

== Professional career ==
Going into the bout with a perfect record of 14 wins from 14 professional fights, Mathieu defeated fellow Canadian boxer Shakeel Phinn by unanimous decision at Montreal Casino in Montreal on October 30, 2025, to win the vacant NABF super-middleweight title.

He made the first defense of the title against Esquiva Falcão on June 11, 2026, at Capitole de Quebec in Quebec City, winning by technical knockout in the eighth round.

At the same venue, Mathieu successfully defended the championship for a second time with a split decision win over Vladimir Shishkin on October 8, 2026. Two of the ringside judges scored the fight 98–92 in his favour, while the third had it 97–93 for his opponent.

== Professional boxing record ==
17 fights	17 wins	0 losses
By knockout	11	0
By decision	6	0

No.	Result	Record	Opponent	Type	Round, time	Date	Location	Notes
17	Win	17–0	(Russia) Vladimir Shishkin	SD	10	8 Oct 2026	Capitole de Quebec, Quebec City, Canada	Retained NABF super middleweight title
16	Win	16–0	(Brazil) Esquiva Falcão	TKO	8 (10), 3:00	11 Jun 2026	Capitole de Quebec, Quebec City, Canada	Retained NABF super middleweight title
15	Win	15–0	(Canada) Shakeel Phinn	UD	10	30 Oct 2025	Montreal Casino, Montreal, Canada	Won vacant WBC Continental Americas and NABF super middleweight titles
14	Win	14–0	(France) Adagio McDonald	KO	3 (8), 0:44	27 Jun 2025	Centre Videotron, Quebec City, Canada	
13	Win	13–0	(Mexico) Ricardo Adrian Luna	KO	2 (8), 1:40	29 Mar 2025	Hamilton, Canada	
12	Win	12–0	(Argentina) Marcos Nicolas Karalitzy	TKO	4 (8), 3:00	7 Nov 2024	Montreal Casino, Montreal, Canada	
11	Win	11–0	(Argentina) Rolando Wenceslao Mansilla	TKO	4 (8), 1:41	5 Sep 2024	Montreal Casino, Montreal, Canada	
10	Win	10–0	(Argentina) Facundo Nicolas Galovar	UD	6	17 Aug 2024	Centre Videotron, Quebec City, Canada	
9	Win	9–0	(Poland) Przemyslaw Gorgon	TKO	4 (6), 0:38	25 May 2024	Centre Gervais Auto, Shawinigan, Canada	
8	Win	8–0	(Czech Republic) Patrik Fiala	TKO	2 (6), 1:57	7 Mar 2023	Montreal Casino, Montreal, Canada	
7	Win	7–0	(Mexico) Oscar Soto Quintana	TKO	4 (6), 0:31	25 Jan 2024	Montreal Casino, Montreal, Canada	
6	Win	6–0	(Mexico) Jose Arias Alvarez	UD	4	13 Jan 2024	Centre Videotron, Quebec City, Canada	
5	Win	5–0	(Poland) Grzegorz Mardyla	UD	6	14 Nov 2023	Montreal Casino, Montreal, Canada	
4	Win	4–0	(Mexico) Cesar Lopez Romo	TKO	3 (4), 0:14	11 Oct 2023	Montreal Casino, Montreal, Canada	
3	Win	3–0	(Mexico) Jesus Frias Rodriguez	KO	2 (4), 2:06	1 Jun 2023	Montreal Casino, Montreal, Canada	
2	Win	2–0	(Mexico) Jose Gonzalez Saldana	UD	4	23 Mar 2023	Montreal Casino, Montreal, Canada	
1	Win	1–0	(Slovakia) Zsolt Birkas	TKO	1 (4) 2:49	2 Feb 2023	Montreal Casino, Montreal, Canada	
