= Nadjib Mohammedi =

French boxer (born 1985)

Personal information
- Nationality: French
- Born: 12 March 1985 (age 41) Gardanne, Bouches-du-Rhône, France
- Height: 1.81 m (5 ft 11 in)
- Weight: Super-middleweight; Light-heavyweight

Boxing career
- Reach: 179 cm (70 in)
- Stance: Orthodox

Boxing record
- Total fights: 53
- Wins: 44
- Win by KO: 27
- Losses: 9

Nadjib Mohammedi (born 12 March 1985 in Gardanne) is a French professional boxer and light heavyweight world title challenger.

== Career ==
Mohammedi turned professional in 2005 and became the France light heavyweight champion in 2008. However, he lost the title a year later in 2009 in an early TKO defeat by Thierry Karl in the first round. Mohammedi would bounce back from his defeat against Karl and become light heavyweight champion of France again in 2013 after defeating Patrick Bois via unanimous decision.

Mohammedi garnered a lot of attention to himself in 2014 after defeating Anatoliy Dudchenko in a 7th round TKO victory which moved him into position to challenge Bernard Hopkins for the IBF light heavyweight title. Mohammedi went on to face Demetrius Walker on the undercard of the Kovalev vs. Hopkins bout and won via KO victory in the 1st round. He announced a deal with boxing promotion company Main Events less than a week after his defeat of Walker. He is currently trained by Abel Sanchez.

== Professional boxing record ==
48 fights	41 wins	7 losses
By knockout	24	5
By decision	17	2

Result	Record	Opponent	Type	Round, time	Date	Location	Notes
Win	41–7	(Latvia) Boriss Lesins	TKO	2 (6)	2019-03-30	Gymnase Trintignant, Uzes, Gard, France	
Loss	40–7	(Russia) Vladimir Shishkin	TKO	10 (12), 1:49	2018-10-13	Ekaterinburg Expo, Ekaterinburg, Russia	For WBA Continental super middleweight title
Loss	40–6	(Russia) Fedor Chudinov	SD	12	2018-07-21	Olimpiyskiy, Moscow, Russia	For WBA International super middleweight title
Win	40–5	(France) Hadillah Mohoumadi	UD	12	2018-03-30	Palais des sports Marcel Cerdan, Levallois-Perret, France	Won vacant WBA Continental super middleweight title
Win	39–5	(France) Hakim Zoulikha	UD	10	2017-11-11	Vélodrome de Saint-Quentin-en-Yvelines, Montigny-le-Bretonneux, France	
Win	38–5	(Ukraine) Roman Shkarupa	UD	12	2016-10-15	Palais des sports Robert Charpentier, Issy-les-Moulineaux, France	Won vacant WBC Francophone super middleweight title
Loss	37–5	(Ukraine) Oleksandr Gvozdyk	KO	2 (10), 2:06	2016-04-09	(United States) MGM Grand Garden Arena, Paradise, Nevada, US	Won vacant WBC-NABF light-heavyweight title
