= Štěpán Horváth =

Czech boxer

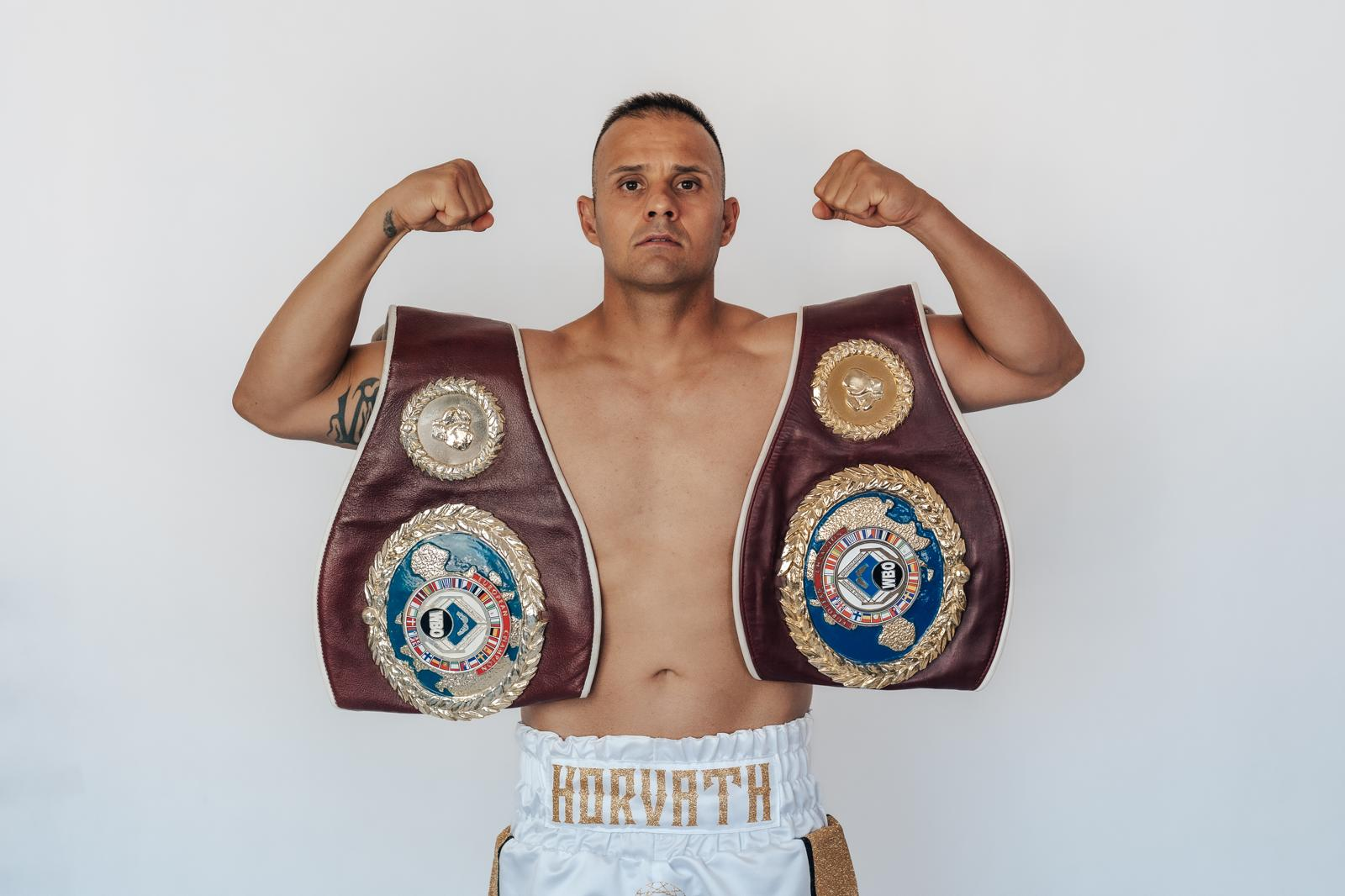

Personal information
- Nationality: Czech
- Born: December 20, 1982 (age 43) Chomutov, Czechoslovakia (now Czech Republic)
- Height: 5 ft 9 in (175 cm)
- Weight: Middleweight; Light middleweight

Boxing career
- Stance: Orthodox

Boxing record
- Total fights: 28
- Wins: 21
- Win by KO: 11
- Losses: 7

Štěpán Horváth (born December 20, 1982) is a Czech professional boxer who held the WBO European super welterweight title between 2016 and 2017. He is of partial Romani descent.

Having lost in previous fights to boxers such as Frank Buglioni, Chris Eubank Jr, and Liam Williams, Horváth won the WBO European super welterweight title in Plzeň against German-Italian boxer Davide Doria in March 2016. In June 2016, Horváth improved his record to 17–5 in defending his title against Hungarian challenger Ferenc Hafner in four rounds. He defended his title for a second time at Královka Arena in Prague against German boxer Arthur Hermann in March 2017.
