= Ryno Liebenberg =

South African boxer

Personal information
- Nationality: South African
- Born: 12 December 1983 (age 42)
- Height: 6 ft 0 in (183 cm)
- Weight: Super-middleweight; Light-heavyweight

Boxing career
- Stance: Orthodox

Boxing record
- Total fights: 33
- Wins: 22
- Win by KO: 15
- Losses: 10
- Draws: 1

Ryno Liebenberg (born 12 December 1983) is a South African professional boxer.

== Professional boxing record ==
33 fights	22 wins	10 losses
By knockout	14	3
By decision	8	7
Draws	1	

No.	Result	Record	Opponent	Type	Round, time	Date	Location	Notes
33	Loss	22–10–1	(Croatia) Luka Plantić	KO	4 (8), 0:50	1 Sep 2022	Gradina, Solin, Croatia	
32	Loss	22–9–1	(Cuba) Ihosvany Garcia	UD	10	25 Jun 2022	Arena Toruń, Toruń, Poland	
31	Win	22–8–1	(Uganda) Kassim Ouma	UD	8	26 Mar 2022	Westfalenhalle, Dortmund, Germany	
30	Loss	21–8–1	(Russia) Fedor Chudinov	UD	12	4 Jun 2021	Sibur Arena, Saint Petersburg, Russia	For WBA Gold super-middleweight title
29	Win	21–7–1	(South Africa) Rowan Campbell	TKO	8 (12), 1:19	14 Mar 2021	Emperors Palace, Kempton Park, South Africa	Won IBO All-Africa, South African, and vacant WBA Pan African super-middleweight titles
28	Win	20–7–1	(Democratic Republic of the Congo) Alex Kabangu	UD	8	15 Mar 2020	Blairgowrie Recreation Centre, Randburg, South Africa	
27	Loss	19–7–1	(Germany) Nick Hannig	UD	12	26 Oct 2019	Maritim Hotel, Berlin, Germany	For WBC International light-heavyweight title
26	Draw	19–6–1	(Germany) Nick Hannig	MD	12	6 Jul 2019	Black Wolves Haus, Wiesbaden, Germany	For WBC International light-heavyweight title
25	Win	19–6	(South Africa) Alfonso Tissen	TKO	5 (12), 1:48	1 Sep 2018	Emperors Palace, Kempton Park, South Africa	Won African super-middleweight title
24	Loss	18–6	(Germany) Vincent Feigenbutz	TKO	6 (12), 2:57	17 Feb 2018	Arena, Ludwigsburg, Germany	For IBF Inter-Continental super-middleweight title
23	Win	18–5	(Democratic Republic of the Congo) Patrick Mukala	UD	10	21 Oct 2017	Emperors Palace, Kempton Park, South Africa	
22	Loss	17–5	(Germany) Enrico Kölling	UD	10	4 Feb 2017	Emperors Palace, Kempton Park, South Africa	
21	Loss	17–4	(Germany) Enrico Kölling	SD	12	1 Oct 2016	Jahnsportforum, Neubrandenburg, Germany	For WBA Inter-Continental light-heavyweight title
20	Loss	17–3	(Sweden) Erik Skoglund	UD	12	23 Apr 2016	Johanneshov, Stockholm, Sweden	For vacant IBO International light-heavyweight title
19	Win	17–2	(South Africa) Makhosandile Zwengu	KO	2 (12)	19 Sep 2015	Emperors Palace, Kempton Park, South Africa	Won vacant South African light-heavyweight title
18	Loss	16–2	(South Africa) Thomas Oosthuizen	SD	12	14 Mar 2015	Emperors Palace, Kempton Park, South Africa	For vacant IBO light-heavyweight title
17	Loss	16–1	(Colombia) Eleider Álvarez	TKO	7 (12), 1:52	25 Oct 2014	Salle des Étoiles, Monte Carlo, Monaco	Lost WBC Silver light-heavyweight title
16	Win	16–0	(Russia) Denis Grachev	UD	12	9 Aug 2014	Emperors Palace, Kempton Park, South Africa	Won vacant WBC Silver light-heavyweight title
15	Win	15–0	(Uganda) Joey Vegas	TKO	1 (12), 2:56	1 Mar 2014	Emperors Palace, Kempton Park, South Africa	Won vacant WBC International light-heavyweight title
14	Win	14–0	(Ghana) Daniel Adotey Allotey	TKO	1 (10)	26 Nov 2013	Emperors Palace, Kempton Park, South Africa	
13	Win	13–0	(Argentina) Gabriel Arturo Ramirez	KO	1 (12)	31 Aug 2013	Emperors Palace, Kempton Park, South Africa	Won vacant WBC Silver International light-heavyweight title
12	Win	12–0	(South Africa) Johnny Muller	UD	12	15 Jun 2013	Emperors Palace, Kempton Park, South Africa	Won vacant IBO Inter-Continental light-heavyweight title
11	Win	11–0	(Ghana) Flash Issaka	TKO	4 (12), 2:32	26 Feb 2013	Emperors Palace, Kempton Park, South Africa	Retained IBO All-Africa light-heavyweight title
10	Win	10–0	(Zambia) Donald Kampamba	KO	9 (12), 1:57	10 Nov 2012	Emperors Palace, Kempton Park, South Africa	Retained IBO All-Africa light-heavyweight title
9	Win	9–0	(South Africa) Johnny Muller	TKO	9 (12), 2:43	22 Sep 2012	Emperors Palace, Kempton Park, South Africa	Won vacant IBO All-Africa light-heavyweight title
8	Win	8–0	(Zimbabwe) Tineyi Maridzo	MD	8	9 Jul 2012	Emperors Palace, Kempton Park, South Africa	
7	Win	7–0	(Uganda) David Basajjamivule	UD	6	26 Mar 2012	Emperors Palace, Kempton Park, South Africa	
6	Win	6–0	(South Africa) Ramis Ilunga	UD	8	3 Dec 2011	Moreleta College Hall, Makapanstad, South Africa	
5	Win	5–0	(South Africa) Tshepang Mohale	KO	6 (8)	29 Aug 2011	Emperors Palace, Kempton Park, South Africa	
4	Win	4–0	(South Africa) Caster Ndou	TKO	2 (4)	11 Jun 2011	Carnival City, Brakpan, South Africa	
3	Win	3–0	(South Africa) Basil Mthethwa	TKO	1 (4)	4 Feb 2011	Ben Marais Hall, Rustenburg, South Africa	
2	Win	2–0	(South Africa) Fikile Nyalunga	TKO	1 (4), 2:58	3 Sep 2010	Turfontein Race Course, Johannesburg, South Africa	
1	Win	1–0	(South Africa) Caster Ndou	KO	3 (4)	8 Jul 2010	Wembley Indoor Arena, Johannesburg, South Africa	
