= Artem Suslenkov =

Russian boxer (born 1995)

Personal information
- Born: Артём Сергеевич Сусленков; 24 September 1995 (age 30) Volgograd, Russia
- Height: 6 ft 1 in (185 cm)
- Weight: Heavyweight

Boxing career
- Stance: Orthodox

Boxing record
- Total fights: 15
- Wins: 15
- Win by KO: 10

Artem Suslenkov (born 24 September 1995) is a Russian professional boxer.

== Amateur career ==
Suslenkov had a successful amateur career which included winning the World Military Games.

== Professional career ==
=== Suslenkov vs. Laggoune ===
After winning the first nine fights of his career, Suslenkov fought Bilal Laggoune in Serpukhov, Russia on 3 February 2024. He defeated the Belgian with relative ease, dropping him in the second round before a corner retirement ahead of the third.

=== Suslenkov vs. Joyce ===
It was announced on 8 June 2026, that Suslenkov would defend his WBA Continental title against Joe Joyce (16–4, 15 KOs) on 11 July 2026 in Moscow. Suslenkov won the fight by stoppage in the 11th round when Joyce signalled he did not want to continue.

== Professional boxing record ==
15 fights	15 wins	0 losses
By knockout	10	0
By decision	5	0

No.	Result	Record	Opponent	Type	Round, time	Date	Location	Notes
15	Win	15–0	Joe Joyce	TKO	11 (12), 2:00	11 Jul 2026	VTB Arena, Moscow, Russia	Won vacant WBA International Gold heavyweight title
14	Win	14–0	Artur Mann	TKO	3 (10), 2:28	16 Apr 2026	Sport Palace, Serpukhov, Russia	Retained WBA Continental heavyweight title
13	Win	13–0	Agron Smakici	RTD	5 (10), 3:00	10 Oct 2025	Colosseum Sport Hall, Grozny, Russia	Won vacant WBA Continental heavyweight title
12	Win	12–0	Jack Mulowayi	MD	10	31 Jan 2025	International Boxing Centre Luzhniki, Moscow, Russia	Won vacant IBF European heavyweight title
11	Win	11–0	Christian Hammer	UD	8	25 Oct 2024	Dynamo Sports Palace, Moscow, Russia	
10	Win	10–0	Bilal Laggoune	RTD	2 (8), 3:00	3 Feb 2024	Serpukhov, Russia	
9	Win	9–0	Mirzohidjon Abdullaev	UD	4	3 Mar 2023	Karen Demirchyan Sports Complex, Yerevan, Armenia	
8	Win	8–0	Timur Dominov	TKO	1 (6), 0:27	7 Oct 2022	Moscow, Russia	
7	Win	7–0	Shokhruz Rakhimov	TKO	2 (8), 2:53	4 Aug 2022	Derbent, Russia	
6	Win	6–0	Alexander Stepanov	KO	1 (6), 1:40	11 Jun 2022	Irina Viner Gymnastics Palace, Moscow, Russia	
5	Win	5–0	Evgeny Kirichenko	UD	6	8 May 2022	Serpukhov, Russia	
4	Win	4–0	Pavel Doroshilov	RTD	2 (6), 3:00	3 Jul 2020	USC Soviet Wings, Moscow, Russia	
3	Win	3–0	Pedro Martinez	UD	6	23 Mar 2019	Sport Palace, Serpukhov, Russia	
2	Win	2–0	Daniel Robles	KO	1 (6), 0:19	21 Dec 2018	Sports Hall, Astrakhan, Russia	
1	Win	1–0	Tornike Puritchamiashvili	RTD	1 (4), 3:00	9 Dec 2018	Luzhniki Palace of Sports, Moscow, Russia	

Sporting positions
Regional boxing titles
Vacant Title last held by Daniel Baer	IBF European heavyweight champion 31 January 2025 – May 2026; Vacated	Vacant Title next held by Emanuel Odiase
Vacant Title last held by Fabio Wardley	WBA Continental heavyweight champion 10 October 2025 – July 2026; Vacated	Vacant
Vacant Title last held by Temur Mamoyan	WBA International Gold heavyweight champion 11 July 2026 – present	Incumbent
