= Nick Hannig =

German boxer (born 1986)

Personal information
- Nationality: German
- Born: 11 September 1986 (age 39) Königs Wusterhausen, East Germany
- Height: 5 ft 9 in (175 cm)
- Weight: Super-middleweight; Light-heavyweight

Boxing career
- Stance: Orthodox

Boxing record
- Total fights: 17
- Wins: 14
- Win by KO: 5
- Losses: 2
- Draws: 1

Nick Hannig (born 11 September 1986) is a German professional boxer. He held the WBO European light-heavyweight title from November 2024 until April 2025.

== Professional boxing career ==
On 10 March 2018, he faced off against Adam Bashanov in a super-middleweight bout in Bashanov's hometown of Struer, Denmark. Hannig won via sixth-round knockout.

On 6 October 2018, he took on UK fighter Kyle Redfearn. Hannig won the fight by way of a six-second, fourth-round knockout.

On 9 February 2019, he faced off against Ryan Ford for the vacant WBC International light-heavyweight title. Hannig won via unanimous decision.

On 6 July 2019, he retained the title against South African boxer Ryno Liebenberg. The fight ended in a majority draw.

On 26 October 2019, he defended the title in a rematch against Ryno Liebenberg. Hannig retained his title via twelve-round unanimous decision.

Hannig lost the title to Ralfs Vilcans at the Hyatt Regency Hotel in Belgrade, Serbia, on 21 May 2021, going down to a majority decision defeat.

On 2 November 2024, he won the vacant WBO European light-heavyweight title by stopping Tom Dzemski in the eighth round at Kraftverkehr Chemnitz in Chemnitz.

Hannig lost the title in his first defense against Mateusz Tryc at MBS Arena in Potsdam on 5 April 2025. He was stopped with 30 seconds left in the final round.

== Professional boxing record ==
17 fights	14 wins	2 losses
By knockout	7	1
By decision	7	1
Draws	1	

No.	Result	Record	Opponent	Type	Round, time	Date	Location	Notes
17	Loss	14–2–1	(Poland) Mateusz Tryc	TKO	10 (10), 2:30	5 Apr 2025	MBS Arena, Potsdam, Germany	Lost WBO European light-heavyweight title
16	Win	14–1–1	(Germany) Tom Dzemski	TKO	8 (10), 2:03	2 Nov 2024	Kraftverkehr Chemnitz, Chemnitz, Germany	Won vacant WBO European light-heavyweight title
15	Win	13–1–1	(Poland) Bartosz Barczynski	UD	6	25 Nov 2023	Verti Music Hall, Friedrichshain, Germany	
14	Win	12–1–1	(Poland) Przemyslaw Gorgon	KO	4 (10), 2:40	6 May 2023	Verti Music Hall, Friedrichshain, Germany	Won vacant BDB International light-heavyweight title
13	Win	11–1–1	(Ukraine) Dmytro Fedas	MD	6	18 Feb 2023	Arena Riga, Riga, Latvia	
12	Win	10–1–1	(Belarus) Siarhei Khamitski	UD	8	18 Dec 2021	Maritim Hotel, Magdeburg, Germany	
11	Loss	9–1–1	(Latvia) Ralfs Vilcans	SD	10	21 May 2021	Hyatt Regency Hotel, Belgrade, Serbia	Lost WBC International light-heavyweight title
10	Win	9–0–1	(Cuba) Ericles Torres Marin	TKO	2 (8), 2:02	20 Dec 2020	Motorworld, Cologne, Germany	
9	Win	8–0–1	(South Africa) Ryno Liebenberg	UD	12	26 Oct 2019	Maritim Hotel, Berlin, Germany	Retained WBC International light-heavyweight title
8	Draw	7–0–1	(South Africa) Ryno Liebenberg	MD	12	6 Jul 2019	Black Wolves Haus, Wiesbaden, Germany	Retained WBC International light-heavyweight title
7	Win	7–0	(Canada) Ryan Ford	UD	12	9 Feb 2019	Verti Music Hall, Berlin, Germany	Won vacant WBC International light-heavyweight title
6	Win	6–0	(Argentina) Damian Ezequiel Bonelli	UD	8	15 Dec 2018	Stockschützenhalle, Kühbach, Germany	
5	Win	5–0	(United Kingdom) Kyle Redfearn	KO	4 (6), 0:06	6 Oct 2018	Congress Park, Wolfsburg, Germany	
4	Win	4–0	(Serbia) Dorde Markovic	UD	6	18 May 2018	MBS Arena, Potsdam, Germany	
3	Win	3–0	(Denmark) Adam Bashanov	KO	6 (6), 1:37	10 Mar 2018	Struer Arena, Struer, Denmark	
2	Win	2–0	(Czech Republic) Ondrej Schwarz	KO	1 (6), 0:12	9 Sep 2017	Max-Schmeling-Halle, Berlin, Germany	
1	Win	1–0	(Belarus) Pavel Hryshkavets	KO	2 (4), 2:59	25 Mar 2017	MBS Arena, Potsdam, Germany	
