= Ben McCulloch (boxer) =

Australian boxer

Personal information
- Nationality: Australian
- Born: 26 March 1982 (age 44) Coffs Harbour, New South Wales, Australia
- Weight: Super-middleweight

Boxing career

Boxing record
- Total fights: 15
- Wins: 14
- Win by KO: 11
- Losses: 1

Ben McCulloch (born 26 March 1982) is an Australian former professional boxer who competed from 2008 to 2014. He held the PABA super-middleweight title from 2012 to 2014 and challenged for the WBA interim title in 2014.

== Professional career ==
McCulloch won the IBF Pan Pacific and vacant PABA super-middleweight titles in October 2012 by defeating Les Piper. He retained the PABA title against Jonatan Simamora and Yodkhunsuk Mor Poowana. McCulloch then challenged Fedor Chudinov for the WBA interim title in December 2014, but was defeated via second-round knockout.

== Professional boxing record ==
15 fights	14 wins	1 loss
By knockout	11	1
By decision	3	0

No.	Result	Record	Opponent	Type	Round, time	Date	Location	Notes
15	Loss	14–1	(Russia) Fedor Chudinov	KO	2 (12), 2:01	11 Dec 2014	Krylatskoye Sports Palace, Moscow, Russia	For vacant WBA interim super-middleweight title
14	Win	14–0	(Thailand) Yodkhunsuk Mor Poowana	TKO	4 (12), 2:56	2 Aug 2014	Municipal Gym, Agoncillo, Philippines	Retained PABA super-middleweight title
13	Win	13–0	(Iran) Gavad Zohrehvand	TKO	3 (6), 2:51	7 Feb 2014	Town Plaza Gymnasium, Biñan, Philippines	
12	Win	12–0	(Indonesia) Jonatan Simamora	KO	6 (12), 1:09	17 Aug 2013	RSL Club, Sawtell, Australia	Retained PABA super-middleweight title
11	Win	11–0	(Australia) Les Piper	KO	9 (12), 2:15	24 Oct 2012	South Sydney Junior Rugby League Club, Kingsford, Australia	Won IBF Pan Pacific and vacant PABA super-middleweight titles
10	Win	10–0	(Iran) Amir Ranjdar	TKO	1 (6), 1:50	10 Aug 2012	Croatian Club, Punchbowl, Australia	
9	Win	9–0	(New Zealand) Eddie Lenart	TKO	1 (4), 1:07	22 Jun 2012	Entertainment Centre, Hurstville, Australia	
8	Win	8–0	(Samoa) Atalili Fai	KO	2 (6), 1:45	19 Feb 2012	Olympic Park Sports Centre, Homebush, Australia	
7	Win	7–0	(Australia) Marlon Toby	TKO	2 (6), 2:13	25 Nov 2011	Croatian Club, Punchbowl, Australia	
6	Win	6–0	(Australia) Mark Flanagan	UD	6	15 Apr 2011	Tavern, Mansfield, Australia	
5	Win	5–0	(Australia) Omar Shaick	SD	6	10 Jun 2010	Tavern, Mansfield, Australia	
4	Win	4–0	(Australia) Shawn Martin	KO	1 (4), 1:27	17 Apr 2010	Yoogali Club, Griffith, Australia	
3	Win	3–0	(Australia) Brian Matchett	MD	6	6 Mar 2009	Croatian Club, Punchbowl, Australia	
2	Win	2–0	(Australia) Paz Viejo	TKO	4 (4), 1:51	7 Feb 2009	Sutherland United Services Club, Sutherland, Australia	
1	Win	1–0	Timophy Nasoa	TKO	1 (4), 1:10	27 Aug 2008	E.G. Whitlam Recreation Center, Liverpool, Australia	

Sporting positions
Regional boxing titles
Preceded by Les Piper	IBF Pan Pacific super-middleweight champion 24 October 2012 – May 2013; Vacated	Title discontinued
Vacant Title last held by Serge Yannick	PABA super-middleweight champion 24 October 2012 – 11 December 2014; Lost bid for WBA interim title	Vacant Title next held by Blake Caparello
