= Jacob Bank =

Danish boxer

Personal information
- Nationality: Danish
- Born: 9 February 2001 (age 25) Kolding, Denmark
- Height: 6 ft (183 cm)
- Weight: Super Middleweight

Boxing career
- Stance: Orthodox

Boxing record
- Total fights: 20
- Wins: 20
- Win by KO: 11

Jacob Bank (born 9 February 2001) is a Danish professional boxer.

== Amateur career ==
Jacob Banks amateur career was 175–5.

== Professional career ==
Bank has picked up the WBO European title since he turned pro and is viewed as a genuine prospect.

=== Bank vs. Scull ===
On 31 January 2026, Bank defeated former world champion William Scull by knockout in the 12th round.

== Professional boxing record ==
20 fights	20 wins	0 losses
By knockout	11	0
By decision	9	0

No.	Result	Record	Opponent	Type	Round, time	Date	Location	Notes
20	Win	20–0	Pawel August	UD	8	25 Jul 2026	Jeddah Superdome, Jeddah, Saudi Arabia	
19	Win	19–0	Paulinus Ndjolonimu	KO	5 (12), 1:19	25 Apr 2026	Sydbank Arena, Kolding, Denmark	
18	Win	18–0	William Scull	KO	12 (12), 2:37	31 Jan 2026	Sydbank Arena, Kolding, Denmark	Retained WBO Global super-middleweight title
17	Win	17–0	Tyron Zeuge	TKO	5 (10) 1:57	13 Sep 2025	Sydbank Arena, Kolding, Denmark	Retained WBO Global super-middleweight title
16	Win	16–0	Damian Biacho	UD	10	1 Mar 2025	Vejen Idraetscenter, Vejen, Denmark	Retained WBO Global super-middleweight title
15	Win	15–0	Ibo Maier	RTD	4 (10), 3:00	23 Nov 2024	Kolding Forum, Kolding, Denmark	Won WBO Global super-middleweight title
14	Win	14–0	Iago Kiziria	UD	8	14 Sep 2024	Midtdjurs Hallen, Ryomgaard, Denmark	
13	Win	13–0	Hernan David Perez	UD	8	20 Apr 2024	ROFI Centret, Ringkobing, Denmark	
12	Win	12–0	Ronny Landaeta	KO	7 (12), 1:28	3 Feb 2024	Kolding Forum, Kolding, Denmark	Won WBO European super-middleweight title
11	Win	11–0	Almir Skrijelj	TKO	2 (8), 1:32	1 Sep 2023	Graakjaer Arena, Holstebro, Denmark	
10	Win	10–0	Ralfs Vilcans	PTS	10	24 Jun 2023	Kolding Forum, Kolding, Denmark	
9	Win	9–0	Taras Holovashchenko	RTD	3 (8), 3:00	25 Feb 2023	Graakjaer Arena, Holstebro, Denmark	
8	Win	8–0	Rafael Bejaran	RTD	1 (10), 3:00	1 Oct 2022	Forum Kolding, Kolding, Denmark	
7	Win	7–0	Idaas Redjdal	KO	3 (6), 0:57	11 Jun 2022	ROFI Centret, Ringkobing, Denmark	
6	Win	6–0	Christian Mazzon	PTS	8	9 Apr 2022	Graakjaer Arena, Holstebro, Denmark	
5	Win	5–0	Aku Kanninen	RTD	7 (10), 3:00	13 Nov 2021	Kolding Hallen, Kolding, Denmark	
4	Win	4–0	Viacheslav Andreiev	PTS	6	28 Aug 2021	ROFI Centret, Ringkobing, Denmark	
3	Win	3–0	Novak Radulovic	PTS	6	25 June 2021	Struer Arena, Stuer, Denmark	
2	Win	2–0	Gaston Due	PTS	4	5 Dec 2020	Gilleleje Hallen, Gilleleje, Denmark	
1	Win	1–0	Birkan Garip	KO	2 (4) 2:07	26 Aug 2020	Struer Arena, Struer, Denmark	

Regional boxing titles
Vacant Title last held by Mate Kis	WBO Global super middleweight champion November 23, 2024 – present	Incumbent
