= Mike Keta =

Albanian boxer

Personal information
- Nickname: Iron
- Nationality: Albanian
- Born: Gjetan Keta; 25 April 1983 (age 43) Bulqizë, Albania
- Height: 168 cm (5 ft 6 in)
- Weight: Middleweight

Boxing career
- Reach: 178 cm (70 in)
- Stance: Orthodox

Boxing record
- Total fights: 27
- Wins: 23
- Win by KO: 19
- Losses: 4

Mike Keta (born 23 April 1983), known as Gjetan Keta, is an Albanian professional boxer who competes as a middleweight.

== Professional career ==
In 2014, Keta expressed his desire to wrestle a match in his hometown, Bulqizë. It was announced that he will defend his WBC Eurasia Pacific Boxing Council middleweight title against the Russian boxer Marat Khuzeev on 18 October 2014 at Bulqiza Arena. There, Keta beat Khuzeev by knockouting him in the third round.

He is trained by his brother Ismail Keta, who was a professional kickboxer.

== Professional boxing record ==
27 fights	23 wins	4 losses
By knockout	19	3
By decision	4	1

No.	Result	Record	Opponent	Type	Round, time	Date	Location	Notes
27	Win	23–4	(Bosnia and Herzegovina) Sladan Janjanin	RTD	5 (12), 3:00	2018-09-08	Debar, North Macedonia	Won vacant WBU German middleweight title
26	Win	22–4	(Colombia) Devis Caceres	KO	6 (8), 1:55	2018-06-02	Allwetteranlage, Munich, Germany	
25	Loss	21–4	(Germany) Vincent Feigenbutz	KO	2 (12), 1:49	2016-12-03	Ufgauhalle, Karlsruhe, Germany	For IBF Inter-Continental super middleweight title
24	Win	21–3	(Kazakhstan) Vasil Sarbayev	UD	8	2016-10-08	Kampfsportcenter, Munich, Germany	
23	Win	20–3	(Turkey) Turgay Uzun	RTD	5 (12), 3:00	2016-02-19	Pallati i Sportit Asllan Rusi, Tirana, Albania	Retained WBC-EPBC middleweight title
22	Win	19–3	(Russia) Aliklych Kanbolatov	KO	3 (10), 2:59	2015-07-18	Gerry Weber Stadium, Halle, Germany	Retained WBC-EPBC middleweight title
21	Win	18–3	(Russia) Marat Khuzeev	KO	3 (10), 1:03	2014-10-18	Bulqizë Arena, Bulqizë, Albania	Retained WBC-EPBC middleweight title
20	Win	17–3	(Georgia (country)) Mikheil Khutsishvili	KO	7 (10), 1:12	2014-07-19	Sporthalle Kickboxen-Deutschland, Munich, Germany	Won vacant WBC-EPBC middleweight title
19	Win	16–3	(Georgia (country)) David Tlashadze	KO	1 (6), 2:19	2014-05-31	König Palast, Krefeld, Germany	
18	Win	15–3	(Romania) Ionut Trandafir Ilie	PTS	6	2013-10-12	Boxcenter, Munich, Germany	
17	Win	14–3	(Hungary) Csaba Torma	KO	3 (6), 2:05	2013-07-27	Munich, Germany	
16	Win	13–3	(Germany) Florian Wildenhof	UD	6	2013-07-06	Westfalenhallen, Dortmund, Germany	
15	Loss	12–3	(Kazakhstan) Andreas Reimer	KO	1 (10), 0:55	2012-12-01	Burg-Waechter Castello, Düsseldorf, Germany	For vacant Germany BDB super welterweight title
14	Win	12–2	(Belgium) Aliaksei Volchan	KO	2 (6), 2:33	2012-09-01	König Pilsener Arena, Oberhausen, Germany	
13	Win	11–2	(Belgium) Uladzislau Mahdanau	KO	2 (6), 2:54	2012-04-13	Lanxess Arena, Cologne, Germany	
12	Loss	10–2	(Germany) Florian Wildenhof	SD	6	2011-12-02	SAP Arena, Mannheim, Germany	
11	Win	10–1	(Turkey) Goekhan Kaya	TKO	2 (6), 1:16	2011-06-25	Lanxess Arena, Cologne, Germany	
10	Win	9–1	(Kyrgyzstan) Viktor Dick	TKO	5 (6), 0:57	2011-02-19	Porsche-Arena, Stuttgart, Germany	
9	Win	8–1	(Germany) Andy Thiele	TKO	6 (6), 2:08	2010-11-20	Munich, Germany	
8	Win	7–1	(Serbia) Mihalj Halas	TKO	1 (4), 1:32	2010-11-12	HanseDom, Stralsund, Germany	
7	Win	6–1	(Hungary) Attila Kiss	UD	6	2010-09-04	Lanxess Arena, Cologne, Germany	
6	Win	5–1	(Czech Republic) Karel Zdarsa	TKO	1 (4), 2:08	2010-06-04	Karl Eckel Halle, Hattersheim am Main, Germany	
5	Win	4–1	(Estonia) Leonti Vorontsuk	TKO	2 (4), 2:41	2010-03-27	Alsterdorfer Sporthalle, Hamburg, Germany	
4	Loss	3–1	(The Gambia) Omar Jatta	TKO	1 (4), 2:55	12 Jul 2008	Color Line Arena, Altona, Hamburg, Germany	
3	Win	3–0	(Czech Republic) Zdenek Siroky	TKO	1 (4), 0:44	2008-05-22	Munich, Germany	
2	Win	2–0	(Germany) Daniel Schulte	TKO	1 (4), 1:00	2008-05-04	Grafing, Germany	
1	Win	1–0	(Austria) Martin Pirklbauer	TKO	1 (4), 1:20	2007-12-21	Alabama-Halle, Munich, Germany	
