= Vladimir Shishkin (boxer) =

Russian boxer (born 1991)

Vladimir Shishkin Владимир Шишкин
Personal information
- Born: Vladimir Igorevich Shishkin; 26 July 1991 (age 35) Stepnoe, Saratov Oblast, Russia
- Height: 6 ft 1 in (185 cm)
- Weight: Super-middleweight

Boxing career
- Reach: 73 in (185 cm)
- Stance: Orthodox

Boxing record
- Total fights: 20
- Wins: 17
- Win by KO: 10
- Losses: 3

Vladimir Igorevich Shishkin (born July 26, 1991) is a Russian professional boxer. He challenged for the International Boxing Federation (IBF) super-middleweight title in 2024.

== Amateur career ==
Shishkin had an amateur record of 301-29.

== Professional career ==
Shishkin made his professional debut on 31 July 2016, scoring a fourth-round technical knockout (TKO) victory against Andrejs Loginovs at the Arena Riga in Latvia.

After compiling a record of 5–0 (2 KOs), he defeated Sergey Khomitsky via seventh-round TKO on 30 May 2018 at the Zimney Stadion in Saint Petersburg, capturing the vacant WBA Asia interim super-middleweight title.

Shishkin was scheduled to face Andrey Sirotkin on 21 July at the Olympic Stadium in Moscow, Russia. Sirotkin was forced to withdraw from the bout after suffering an injury during training, subsequently being replaced by Gasan Gasanov. With the vacant WBA Continental (Europe) super-middleweight title on the line, Shishkin defeated Gasanov via fifth-round TKO to capture his second professional title.

Shishkin fought William Scull for the vacant IBF super-middleweight title at Stadthalle in Falkensee, Germany, on 19 October 2024. He lost the contest, and his unbeaten professional record, by unanimous decision.

On 8 October 2026, Shishkin challenged NABF super-middleweight champion Wilkens Mathieu at Capitole de Quebec in Quebec City, Canada, losing via split decision. One of the ringside judges scored the fight 97–93 in his favour but was overruled by the other two who both had it 98–92 for his opponent.

== Professional boxing record ==
| 20 fights | 17 wins | 3 losses |
|---|---|---|
| By knockout | 11 | 1 |
| By decision | 6 | 2 |

| No. | Result | Record | Opponent | Type | Round, time | Date | Location | Notes |
|---|---|---|---|---|---|---|---|---|
| 20 | Loss | 17–3 | Wilkens Mathieu | SD | 10 | 8 Oct 2026 | Capitole de Québec, Quebec City, Canada | For NABF super-middleweight title |
| 19 | Win | 17–2 | Bernardo Jimenez Suarez | KO | 7 (10), 2:09 | 25 May 2026 | Coliseo Carlos 'Teo' Cruz, Detroit, Santo Domingo Puerto Rico | |
| 18 | Loss | 16–2 | Osleys Iglesias | TKO | 8 (12), 1:28 | 4 Sep 2025 | Montreal Casino, Montreal, Canada | For IBO super-middleweight title |
| 17 | Loss | 16–1 | William Scull | UD | 12 | Oct 19, 2024 | Stadthalle, Falkensee, Germany | For vacant IBF super-middleweight title |
| 16 | Win | 16–0 | Mike Guy | TKO | 7 (10), 2:14 | 28 Mar 2024 | Wayne State Fieldhouse, Detroit, Michigan, U.S. | |
| 15 | Win | 15–0 | Ramon Ayala | KO | 2 (8), 1:40 | 29 Sep 2023 | Miccosukee Indian Gaming Resort, Miami, Florida, U.S. | |
| 14 | Win | 14–0 | José Uzcátegui | UD | 12 | 17 Dec 2022 | The Cosmopolitan of Las Vegas, Paradise, Nevada, U.S. | |
| 13 | Win | 13–0 | Jeyson Minda | TKO | 6 (8), 1:38 | 5 Mar 2022 | Ford Community Center, Dearborn, Michigan, US | |
| 12 | Win | 12–0 | Sena Agbeko | UD | 10 | 17 Feb 2021 | Mohegan Sun Arena, Montville, Connecticut, US | |
| 11 | Win | 11–0 | Óscar Riojas | TKO | 9 (10), 0:48 | 20 Aug 2020 | Kronk Gym, Detroit, Michigan, US | |
| 10 | Win | 10–0 | Ulises Sierra | UD | 10 | 17 Jan 2020 | WinnaVegas Casino Resort, Sloan, Iowa, US | |
| 9 | Win | 9–0 | DeAndre Ware | TKO | 8 (10), 2:40 | 23 Aug 2019 | Central Park Community Center, Broken Arrow, Oklahoma, US | |
| 8 | Win | 8–0 | Nadjib Mohammedi | TKO | 10 (12), 1:49 | 13 Oct 2018 | Yekaterinburg Expo, Yekaterinburg, Russia | Retained WBA Asia super-middleweight title |
| 7 | Win | 7–0 | Gasan Gasanov | KO | 5 (10), 0:24 | 21 Jul 2018 | Olympic Stadium, Moscow, Russia | Won vacant WBA Asia super-middleweight title |
| 6 | Win | 6–0 | Sergey Khomitsky | TKO | 7 (10), 0:59 | 30 May 2018 | Zimniy Stadion, Saint Petersburg, Russia | Won vacant WBA Asia interim super-middleweight title |
| 5 | Win | 5–0 | Konstantin Piternov | UD | 6 | 21 Dec 2017 | USC Soviet Wings, Moscow, Russia | |
| 4 | Win | 4–0 | Mark Chimidov | UD | 8 | 22 Jul 2017 | Red Square, Moscow, Russia | |
| 3 | Win | 3–0 | Attila Körös | TKO | 3 (6), 1:20 | 4 Feb 2017 | Dynamo Sports Palace, Moscow, Russia | |
| 2 | Win | 2–0 | Karen Avetisyan | UD | 6 | 16 Aug 2016 | Korston Club, Moscow, Russia | |
| 1 | Win | 1–0 | Andrejs Loginovs | TKO | 4 (4), 0:39 | 31 Jul 2016 | Arena Riga, Riga, Latvia | |

Sporting positions
Regional boxing titles
| Vacant Title last held by Zulipikaer Maimaitiali | WBA Asia super-middleweight champion Interim title 30 May 2018 – July 2018 | Vacant Title next held by Ainiwaer Yilixiati |
| Vacant Title last held by Nadjib Mohammedi | WBA Continental (Europe) super-middleweight champion 21 July 2018 – May 2019 | Vacant Title next held by Fedor Chudinov |
