= Tyron Zeuge =

German boxer (born 1992)

Personal information
- Born: 12 May 1992 (age 34) Berlin, Germany
- Height: 5 ft 10 1/2 in (179 cm)
- Weight: Super middleweight

Boxing career
- Stance: Orthodox

Boxing record
- Total fights: 33
- Wins: 29
- Win by KO: 16
- Losses: 3
- Draws: 1

Tyron Zeuge (born 12 May 1992) is a German professional boxer who held the WBA (Regular) super-middleweight title from 2016 to 2018.

== Professional career ==
On 16 August 2014, Zeuge defeated Baker Barakat by ninth-round technical knockout to win the IBF International super middleweight title.

He won the WBA (Regular) super-middleweight title by knocking out defending champion Giovanni De Carolis in the final round at MBS Arena in Potsdam on 5 November 2016.

Zeuge successfully defended the title three times, against Paul Smith and twice against Isaac Ekpo, before losing the championship to Rocky Fielding via fifth round knockout at Baden-Arena in Offenburg on 14 July 2018.

He won the vacant European Union super-middleweight title by knocking out Adan Silvera in the 10th round at Sport-und Kongresshalle in Schwerin on 15 June 2019.

== Professional boxing record ==
33 fights	29 wins	3 losses
By knockout	16	2
By decision	13	1
Draws	1	

No.	Result	Record	Opponent	Type	Round, time	Date	Location	Notes
33	Loss	29–3–1	Jacob Bank	TKO	5 (10) 1:57	13 Sep 2025	Sydbank Arena, Kolding, Denmark	For WBO Global super-middleweight title
32	Win	29–2–1	Serhat Parlak	UD	10	11 Jan 2025	XPOST, Cologne, Germany	
31	Win	28–2–1	Sladan Janjanin	TKO	4 (8), 1:16	28 Sep 2024	Arena Ludwigsburg, Ludwigsburg, Germany	
30	Loss	27–2–1	Zach Parker	UD	10	16 Mar 2024	Resorts World Arena, Birmingham, England	
29	Win	27–1–1	Nasser Bukenya	UD	8	23 Sep 2023	GETEC Arena, Magdeburg, Germany	
28	Win	26–1–1	Ondrej Budera	UD	6	27 May 2023	Helios Arena, Villingen-Schwenningen, Germany	
27	Win	25–1–1	Michal Ryba	TKO	1 (6), 2:33	18 Feb 2023	Porsche-Arena, Stuttgart, Germany	
26	Win	24–1–1	Adan Silvera	KO	10 (12), 1:35	15 Jun 2019	Sport- und Kongresshalle, Schwerin, Germany	Won vacant European Union super-middleweight title
25	Win	23–1–1	Cheikh Dioum	TKO	8 (8), 2:13	22 Sep 2018	MBS Arena, Potsdam, Germany	
24	Loss	22–1–1	Rocky Fielding	TKO	5 (12), 2:30	14 Jul 2018	Baden-Arena, Offenburg, Germany	Lost WBA (Regular) super-middleweight title
23	Win	22–0–1	Isaac Ekpo	TKO	2 (12), 0:23	24 Mar 2018	Edel-optics.de Arena, Hamburg, Germany	Retained WBA (Regular) super-middleweight title
22	Win	21–0–1	Paul Smith	UD	12	17 Jun 2017	Rittal Arena, Wetzlar, Germany	Retained WBA (Regular) super-middleweight title
21	Win	20–0–1	Isaac Ekpo	TD	5 (12), 2:23	25 Mar 2017	MBS Arena, Potsdam, Germany	Retained WBA and GBU super-middleweight titles; Unanimous TD after Zeuge cut from accidental head clash
20	Win	19–0–1	Giovanni De Carolis	KO	12 (12), 2:41	5 Nov 2016	MBS Arena, Potsdam, Germany	Won WBA and GBU super-middleweight titles
19	Draw	18–0–1	Giovanni De Carolis	MD	12	16 Jul 2016	Max-Schmeling-Halle, Berlin, Germany	For WBA and GBU super-middleweight titles
18	Win	18–0	Ruben Eduardo Acosta	UD	10	9 Apr 2016	MBS Arena, Potsdam, Germany	
17	Win	17–0	Nikola Sjekloća	UD	12	25 Apr 2015	Columbiahalle, Berlin, Germany	Retained IBF International super-middleweight title
16	Win	16–0	Stjepan Božić	RTD	5 (12), 3:00	6 Dec 2014	EWE Arena, Oldenburg, Germany	Retained IBF International super-middleweight title
15	Win	15–0	Baker Barakat	TKO	9 (10), 1:05	16 Aug 2014	Messe, Erfurt, Germany	Won vacant IBF International super-middleweight title
14	Win	14–0	Armand Cullhaj	TKO	9 (10), 1:12	7 Jun 2014	Sport- und Kongresshalle, Schwerin, Germany	Retained WBO Youth super-middleweight title
13	Win	13–0	Gheorghe Sabau	TKO	9 (10), 0:37	5 Apr 2014	StadtHalle, Rostock, Germany	Retained WBO Youth super-middleweight title
12	Win	12–0	George Beroshvili	UD	10	25 Jan 2014	Hanns-Martin-Schleyer-Halle, Stuttgart, Germany	Won vacant WBO Youth super-middleweight title
11	Win	11–0	Alessio Furlan	TKO	5 (8), 1:59	14 Dec 2013	Jahnsportforum, Neubrandenburg, Germany	
10	Win	10–0	Achilles Szabo	UD	8	26 Oct 2013	EWE Arena, Oldenburg, Germany	
9	Win	9–0	Nathan King	UD	8	24 Aug 2013	Sport- und Kongresshalle, Schwerin, Germany	
8	Win	8–0	David Sarabia	UD	8	8 Jun 2013	Max-Schmeling-Halle, Berlin, Germany	
7	Win	7–0	Mike Guy	UD	8	27 Apr 2013	Alsterdorfer Sporthalle, Hamburg, Germany	
6	Win	6–0	Srdjan Mihajlovic	TKO	1 (6), 2:36	2 Feb 2013	Max-Schmeling-Halle, Berlin, Germany	
5	Win	5–0	Vasile Dragomir	KO	1 (6), 2:55	15 Dec 2012	Nuremberg Arena, Nuremberg, Germany	
4	Win	4–0	Matingu Kindele	UD	6	3 Nov 2012	Gerry Weber Stadion, Halle, Germany	
3	Win	3–0	Carlos Caicedo	TKO	3 (4), 2:58	25 Aug 2012	O2 World, Berlin, Germany	
2	Win	2–0	Santo Drago	TKO	3 (4), 0:31	5 May 2012	Messe, Erfurt, Germany	
1	Win	1–0	Yauheni Bahdanouski	TKO	1 (4), 1:14	31 Mar 2012	Sparkassen-Arena, Kiel, Germany	

== See also ==
- List of world super-middleweight boxing champions

Sporting positions
Regional boxing titles
Vacant Title last held by Hugo Kasperski	WBO Youth super-middleweight champion 25 January 2014 – August 2014; Vacated	Vacant Title next held by Tim-Robin Lihaug
Vacant Title last held by Przemysław Opalach	IBF International super-middleweight champion 16 August 2014 – April 2016; Vacated	Vacant Title next held by Stanyslav Kashtanov
Vacant Title last held by Ronny Landaeta	European EU super-middleweight champion 15 June 2019 – 2020; Vacated	Vacant Title next held by Daniele Scardina
Minor world boxing titles
Preceded by Giovanni De Carolis	GBU super-middleweight champion 5 November 2016 – 24 March 2018; Stripped	Vacant Title next held by Vincent Feigenbutz
Major world boxing titles
Preceded by Giovanni De Carolis	WBA super-middleweight champion 5 November 2016 – 27 May 2017; Relegated to secondary champion	Vacant Title next held by George Groves as Super champion
Vacant Title last held by Giovanni De Carolis	WBA (Regular) super middleweight champion 27 May 2017 – 14 July 2018	Succeeded by Rocky Fielding
