= Fedor Chudinov =

Russian boxer (born 1987)

Fedor Chudinov Фёдор Чудинов
Personal information
- Nationality: Russian
- Born: 15 September 1987 (age 39) Bratsk, Russian SFSR, USSR (now Russia)
- Height: 5 ft 9 1/2 in (177 cm)
- Weight: Super middleweight

Boxing career
- Reach: 72 in (183 cm)
- Stance: Orthodox

Boxing record
- Total fights: 30
- Wins: 26
- Win by KO: 17
- Losses: 3
- Draws: 1

Fedor Alexandrovich Chudinov (born 15 September 1987) is a Russian professional boxer. He held the WBA (Super) super-middleweight title in 2016, having previously held the regular title from 2015 to 2016 and the interim title from 2014 to 2015. He is the brother of fellow boxer Dmitry Chudinov.

== Early life ==
Fedor Chudinov was born on 15 September 1987 in Bratsk, in Irkutsk Oblast, Russia. He lived there until he was 10 years old, after which his family decided to move to the city of Serpukhov, a city close to the capital of Moscow. His grandfather, Vladimir Soloshenko, a distinguished engineer and production plant, was a large influence on him growing up. He is said to have taken up the sport of boxing at the age of 12.

== Professional career ==
In 2009, both Fedor and his brother Dmitry received an offer to move to the US and begin their professional career. Despite their coach Alexey Galeev opposing the idea, they accepted the offer and moved to the US.

His professional debut was on 10 July 2009, against American boxer Shawn Kirk at the Reno Events Center in Reno, Nevada. Fedor won the four-rounder via first-round technical knockout (TKO) with 0:33 seconds left on the clock, securing the first pro win of his career.

On 11 September 2014, he fought Australian Ben McCulloch in his home country. Chudinov was visibly the stronger fighter, after McCulloch decided to trade with the Russian, Chudinov landed an overhead right that knocked his opponent out cold. With this win, he secured the WBA interim super-middleweight title, which would subsequently lead him to a fight for the full world title.

In his first world title fight, for the WBA super-middleweight title, he challenged champion Felix Sturm on his own turf in Germany. The home fighter had some success early in the fight, proving more active with his punches. However, Chudinov showed great ring IQ and skill, especially in the latter part of the fight, to cause some serious damage to Sturm. He would end up winning the fight by a split-decision (SD) and win his first ever world title.

On 26 September 2015, he was scheduled to make his first defense of the title, in the UK, against British boxer Frank Buglioni, then ranked #4 by the WBA. Chudinov went into the fight as a heavy favorite, and did not disappoint. Buglioni showed a lot of heart in the fight, and even managed to drop his opponent. However, the knockdown was ruled as illegal, since Buglioni's right hook connected after the bell rang, causing the referee to deduct two points from the home fighter. From the ninth round onwards, Chudinov seemed to be able to punish Buglioni at will. Chudinov won the fight by unanimous decision (UD).

In October 2015, it was announced that Chudinov has agreed to a rematch against Felix Sturm. The rematch was way more competitive than their first encounter, with both fighters trading but never really causing serious damage to the opponent. In a very close fight, the win was rewarded to the challenger, with one judge scoring the fight a draw at 114–114 while the other two scored it 115–113 in favor of Sturm.

In his next fight, he had an opportunity to regain his title, by fighting for the vacant WBA super-middleweight title against George Groves. The fight was pretty even for the first five rounds. The fifth round ended with both fighters exchanging power shots on the ropes, and both being able to stay on their feet. In the sixth round, however, Groves unleashed a flurry of power punches from the beginning of the round. Even though Chudinov wasn't dropped, the referee noticed he was taking too much punishment, and decided to stop the contest with 1:14 left in the round.

In May 2018, he announced he will be teaming up with boxing trainer Abel Sanchez, which would also allow him to work in a friendly atmosphere with two other of Sanchez' boxers, Gennady Golovkin and Murat Gassiev.

On 21 July 2018, Chudinov fought former light-heavyweight world title challenger Nadjib Mohammedi to a controversial SD win. Many thought Mohammedi was the busier man for most of the rounds, and even the home crowd booing over the decision. One judge had it 118–111 for Mohammedi while the other two had it 116–112 and 115–113 for the home fighter.

On 22 July 2019, Chudinov, ranked #3 by the WBA and #6 by the WBC and IBF, defeated Ezequiel Maderna via tenth-round knockout (KO).

After that, the same year in December he fought former world champion Hassan N'Dam N'Jikam. Chudinov was ranked #1 by the WBA, #6 by the WBC, #8 by the IBF and #11 by the WBO at the time. In what was perhaps Chudinov's best performance up-to-date, he managed to control most of the fight, punishing N'Jikam in the process, especially in the later rounds. N'Jikam made it to the final bell, but Chudinov won the fight convincingly on the scorecards.

== Professional boxing record ==
30 fights	26 wins	3 losses
By knockout	17	1
By decision	9	2
Draws	1	

No.	Result	Record	Opponent	Type	Round, time	Date	Location	Notes
30	Win	26–3–1	Farrukh Juraev	UD	10	24 Sep 2022	Sibur Arena, Saint Petersburg, Russia	
29	Loss	25–3–1	Azizbek Abdugofurov	UD	10	24 Apr 2022	Vegas City Hall, Krasnogorsk, Russia	
28	Win	25–2–1	Ronny Mittag	RTD	2 (10), 3:00	15 Oct 2021	Basket-Hall, Kazan, Russia	
27	Win	24–2–1	Ryno Liebenberg	UD	12	4 Jun 2021	Sibur Arena, Saint Petersburg, Russia	Retained WBA Gold super-middleweight title
26	Draw	23–2–1	Isaac Chilemba	SD	10	20 Feb 2021	Crocus City Hall, Krasnogorsk, Russia	
25	Win	23–2	Umar Sadiq	TKO	12 (12), 0:26	11 Sep 2020	Basketball Center, Khimki, Russia	Retained WBA Gold super-middleweight title
24	Win	22–2	Hassan N'Dam N'Jikam	UD	12	13 Dec 2019	Manezh, Vladikavkaz, Russia	Won vacant WBA Gold super-middleweight title
23	Win	21–2	Ezequiel Maderna	KO	10 (12), 1:44	22 Jul 2019	Red Square, Moscow, Russia	
22	Win	20–2	Rafael Bejaran	RTD	2 (12), 3:00	16 May 2019	Basket-Hall, Kazan, Russia	
21	Win	19–2	Wuzhati Nuerlang	RTD	5 (10), 3:00	23 Mar 2019	Sport Palace "Nadezhda", Serpukhov, Russia	
20	Win	18–2	Nadjib Mohammedi	SD	12	21 Jul 2018	Olympic Stadium, Moscow, Russia	
19	Win	17–2	Timo Laine	RTD	7 (12), 3:00	3 Feb 2018	Bolshoy Ice Dome, Sochi, Russia	
18	Win	16–2	Ryan Ford	UD	12	9 Dec 2017	Arena, Kemerovo, Russia	
17	Win	15–2	Jonathan Barbadillo	TKO	2 (10), 1:17	22 Jul 2017	Red Square, Moscow, Russia	
16	Loss	14–2	George Groves	TKO	6 (12), 1:14	27 May 2017	Bramall Lane, Sheffield, England	For vacant WBA (Super) super-middleweight title
15	Loss	14–1	Felix Sturm	MD	12	20 Feb 2016	König Pilsener Arena, Oberhausen, Germany	Lost WBA (Super) super-middleweight title
14	Win	14–0	Frank Buglioni	UD	12	26 Sep 2015	Wembley Arena, London, England	Retained WBA (Regular) super-middleweight title
13	Win	13–0	Felix Sturm	SD	12	9 May 2015	Festhalle Frankfurt, Frankfurt, Germany	Won vacant WBA (Regular) super-middleweight title
12	Win	12–0	Ben McCulloch	KO	2 (12), 2:01	11 Dec 2014	Krylatskoye Sports Palace, Moscow, Russia	Won vacant WBA interim super-middleweight title
11	Win	11–0	Francisco Suero Perez	TKO	3 (9), 1:04	28 Jun 2014	Sheraton Hotel, Santo Domingo, Dominican Republic	Won WBA Fedecaribe super-middleweight title
10	Win	10–0	Stjepan Božić	RTD	5 (12), 3:00	23 Mar 2014	Sports Palace "Znamya", Noginsk, Russia	Won vacant WBC–CISBB super-middleweight title
9	Win	9–0	Francis Cheka	RTD	3 (6), 3:00	31 Dec 2013	Krylatskoye Sports Palace, Moscow, Russia	
8	Win	8–0	Jimmy Colas	UD	10	15 Nov 2013	Sport Palace, Barnaul, Russia	
7	Win	7–0	Karama Nyilawila	TKO	3 (10), 0:58	24 Aug 2013	Open Air Bike Show, Volgograd, Russia	
6	Win	6–0	Julio Acosta	KO	4 (8), 1:49	18 May 2013	Yunost, Klimovsk, Russia	
5	Win	5–0	Kostyantyn Lyashik	TKO	1 (6), 2:19	19 May 2012	Yunost, Klimovsk, Russia	
4	Win	4–0	Jeremiah Jones	KO	2 (4), 1:28	25 Mar 2010	Commerce Casino, Commerce, California, US	
3	Win	3–0	Cesar Ibarra	UD	4	17 Dec 2009	Commerce Casino, Commerce, California, US	
2	Win	2–0	Mikhail Lyubarsky	TKO	1 (4), 1:11	22 Aug 2009	Casino Resort and Spa, Pala, California, US	
1	Win	1–0	Shawn Kirk	TKO	1 (4), 0:33	10 Jul 2009	Events Center, Reno, Nevada, US	

== See also ==
- List of world super-middleweight boxing champions

Sporting positions
Regional boxing titles
Vacant Title last held by Dmitry Sukhotsky	WBC–CISBB super-middleweight champion March 23, 2014 – December 11, 2014; Won WBA interim title	Vacant Title next held by Dilmurod Satybaldiev
Preceded by Francisco Suero Perez	WBA Fedecaribe super-middleweight champion June 28, 2014 – December 11, 2014; Won interim title	Vacant Title next held by Daniele Scardina
Vacant Title last held by Lennox Allen	WBA Gold super-middleweight champion December 13, 2019 – 2022; Vacated	Vacant Title next held by Uwel Hernandez
World boxing titles
Vacant Title last held by Stanyslav Kashtanov	WBA super-middleweight champion Interim title December 11, 2014 – May 9, 2015; Won regular title	Vacant Title next held by Vincent Feigenbutz
Vacant Title last held by Carl Froch	WBA (Regular) super middleweight champion May 9 – November 12, 2015; Promoted	Vacant Title next held by Giovanni De Carolis
Vacant Title last held by Andre Ward as Super champion	WBA super-middleweight champion November 12, 2015 – January 4, 2016; Promoted	Vacant Title next held by Himself as Super champion
Vacant Title last held by Andre Ward	WBA super-middleweight champion Super title January 4, 2016 – February 20, 2016	Succeeded by Felix Sturm
