= Kurayli =

Coordinates: 50.4610°N 57.0200°E

Kurayli is a rural locality located in Aktobe Region, Kazakhstan.
