= Ahmet Patterson =

British boxer

Ahmet Patterson also known as Pattycake Patterson or Punch Picker Patterson is an English boxer residing in Leyton in east London, England with his mother.

Patterson was born to a Turkish Cypriot father and a Jamaican mother and holds British nationality. He first started boxing when he was 14 years old at Fitzroy Lodge. He then left Fitzroy in mid 2010 and moved to Repton ABC due to the fact he thought he wasn't getting 'enough sparring'. He now goes to Peacock gym in East London and is managed by Martin Bowers.

In his early amateur career Patterson was boxing for England. He had a total of 67 fights and lost only 7. Patterson won a multi-nations tournament in Cyprus. He was asked to fight for Jamaica in the Commonwealth Games as he was not picked for England, but at that point Patterson decided to go pro.

In his pro career Patterson is unbeaten in 17 fights, His most recent fight he produced a 6th-round TKO win over Ryan Aston.
