= Travell Mazion =

American boxer (1995–2020)

Personal information
- Nickname: Black Magic
- Born: July 24, 1995 Austin, Texas, U.S.
- Died: July 15, 2020 (aged 24) Austin, Texas, U.S.
- Height: 6 ft 2 in (188 cm)
- Weight: Light middleweight

Boxing career
- Reach: 75 in (191 cm)
- Stance: Orthodox

Boxing record
- Total fights: 17
- Wins: 17
- Win by KO: 13
- Losses: 0

Travell Mazion (July 24, 1995 – July 15, 2020) was an American professional boxer who held the WBC-NABF super welterweight title from January until his death in a car crash in July 2020.

== Professional career ==
Mazion made his professional debut on April 27, 2013, scoring a first-round technical knockout (TKO) victory over Ricky Young at the Frank Erwin Center in Austin, Texas.

After compiling a record of 16–0 (12 KOs) he challenged for his first professional title, the vacant WBC-NABF super welterweight title against Fernando Castañeda on January 11, 2020 at the Alamodome in San Antonio, Texas. Mazion stopped Castañeda in the first round, scoring a knockout (KO) at 58 seconds into the fight with a left hook to the body.

== Professional boxing record ==
17 fights	17 wins	0 losses
By knockout	13	0
By decision	4	0

No.	Result	Record	Opponent	Type	Round, time	Date	Location	Notes
17	Win	17–0	(Mexico) Fernando Castañeda	KO	1 (10), 0:58	Jan 11, 2020	(United States) Alamodome, San Antonio, Texas, U.S.	Won vacant WBC-NABF super welterweight title
16	Win	16–0	(Mexico) Diego Cruz	UD	10	Nov 14, 2019	(United States) Belasco Theater, Los Angeles, California, U.S.	
15	Win	15–0	(United States) Jeremy Ramos	UD	8	Aug 10, 2019	(United States) The Theatre at Grand Prairie, Grand Prairie, Texas, U.S.	
14	Win	14–0	(Mexico) Alan Zavala	KO	1 (8), 2:39	Sep 29, 2018	(United States) Fantasy Springs Casino, Indio, California, U.S.	
13	Win	13–0	(United States) Daquan Arnett	UD	8	Jun 8, 2018	(United States) Turning Stone Resort Casino, Verona, New York, U.S.	
12	Win	12–0	(Mexico) Even Torres	UD	6	Jun 17, 2017	(United States) Tostitos Championship Plaza, Frisco, Texas, U.S.	
11	Win	11–0	(Mexico) Juan Jesus Rivera	KO	1 (6), 2:36	Apr 20, 2017	(United States) Turning Stone Resort Casino, Verona, New York, U.S.	
10	Win	10–0	(United States) Joshua Snyder	TKO	1 (8), 1:37	Mar 12, 2015	(United States) Freeman Coliseum, San Antonio, Texas, U.S.	
9	Win	9–0	(United States) Steve Trumble	KO	1 (6), 0:30	May 17, 2014	(United States) The Backyard, Austin, Texas, U.S.	
8	Win	8–0	(United States) Antonio Sanchez	KO	1 (6), 2:23	Apr 18, 2014	(United States) Illusions Theater, San Antonio, Texas, U.S.	
7	Win	7–0	(United States) Justo Vallecillo	TKO	3 (6), 1:37	Feb 10, 2014	(United States) Cowboys Dance Hall, Arlington, Texas, U.S.	
6	Win	6–0	(United States) Roy Garcia	TKO	2 (4), 0:50	Nov 11, 2013	(United States) Cowboys Dance Hall, Arlington, Texas, U.S.	
5	Win	5–0	(United States) Hector Garza	TKO	3 (4), 0:10	Oct 19, 2013	(United States) Cowboys Dance Hall, Arlington, Texas, U.S.	
4	Win	4–0	(United States) Aaron Anderson	TKO	3 (4), 2:30	Sep 21, 2013	(United States) Bayou Event Center, Houston, Texas, U.S.	
3	Win	3–0	(United States) Terrance Roy	TKO	1 (4), 2:58	Aug 24, 2013	(United States) Cowboys Dance Hall, Arlington, Texas, U.S.	
2	Win	2–0	(United States) Jerry Fuentes	TKO	1 (4), 0:44	Jun 28, 2013	(United States) College Park Center, Arlington, Texas, U.S.	
1	Win	1–0	(United States) Ricky Young	TKO	1 (4), 1:05	Apr 27, 2013	(United States) Frank Erwin Center, Austin, Texas, U.S.	

Sporting positions
Regional boxing titles
Vacant Title last held by Carlos Adames	WBC-NABF super welterweight champion January 11, 2020 – July 15, 2020; Died	Vacant
