= Vincent Feigenbutz =

German boxer (born 1995)

Personal information
- Nickname: KO King
- Nationality: German
- Born: 11 September 1995 (age 31) Karlsruhe, Baden-Württemberg, Germany
- Height: 5 ft 10 1/2 in (179 cm)
- Weight: Super-middleweight

Boxing career
- Reach: 74 in (188 cm)

Boxing record
- Total fights: 41
- Wins: 38
- Win by KO: 33
- Losses: 3

Vincent Feigenbutz (born 11 September 1995) is a German professional boxer. He held the WBA (Regular) super-middleweight title in 2016 and challenged for the IBF super-middleweight title in 2020.

== Professional career ==
Feigenbutz turned pro at the age of 16, with no amateur background. After winning his first fight by knockout, Feigenbutz was stopped by way of TKO in his second bout. Feigenbutz was able to continue building his career, eventually winning the WBA interim super middleweight title against Peruvian veteran Mauricio Reynoso in July 2015.

=== Feigenbutz vs. De Carolis ===
Later that year, Feigenbutz defended his title against Giovanni De Carolis, winning a controversial decision (115-113, 115-113, 114-113) that was widely reviled. Feigenbutz was knocked down in the first round of that bout. An immediate rematch was agreed to, for the WBA's regular championship.

=== Feigenbutz vs. De Carolis II ===
The second fight was won by De Carolis with an 11th-round TKO.

In 2017, Feigenbutz was named as a reserve for the World Boxing Super Series.

=== Feigenbutz vs. Nunez ===
On February 15, 2020, Feigenbutz fought Cesar Nunez. Feigenbutz won the fight via eighth round TKO, after dropping Nunez twice in the round.

=== Feigenbutz vs. Plant ===
Feigenbutz vs Plant place on March 8, 2022 and it was for Plant's IBF super middleweight belt. The fight resulted in a tenth round TKO victory for Plant.

=== Feigenbutz vs. Saidi ===
In his next bout, Feigenbutz fought and defeated Jama Saidi via unanimous decision, 118-111, 116-112 and 116-112 on the scorecards.

== Professional boxing record ==
41 fights	38 wins	3 losses
By knockout	33	3
By decision	5	0

No.	Result	Record	Opponent	Type	Round, time	Date	Location	Notes
41	Win	38–3	Lukas Ferneza	UD	8	1 May 2025	Grosse Freiheit 36, Hamburg, Germany	
40	Win	37–3	Ognjen Solaja	KO	3 (6), 2:30	26 Apr 2025	Rintheimer Sporthalle, Karlsruhe, Germany	
39	Win	36–3	Marcos Jesus Cornejo	KO	4 (8), 0:30	24 Jun 2023	Eisstadion, Heilbronn, Germany	
38	Win	35–3	Diego Ramirez	KO	4 (8), 2:55	10 Sep 2022	Universum Gym, Hamburg, Germany	
37	Win	34–3	Kenan Catic	TKO	2 (8), 2:24	16 Apr 2022	Ballhaus Forum, Unterschleißheim, Germany	
36	Win	33–3	Nuhu Lawal	KO	9 (10), 2:58	19 Jun 2021	Universum Gym, Hamburg, Germany	
35	Win	32–3	Jama Saidi	UD	12	28 Aug 2020	Havelstudios, Berlin, Germany	Won vacant IBF Inter-Continental middleweight title
34	Loss	31–3	Caleb Plant	TKO	10 (12), 2:23	15 Feb 2020	Bridgestone Arena, Nashville, Tennessee, US	For IBF super-middleweight title
33	Win	31–2	Cesar Nunez	TKO	8 (12), 1:58	17 Aug 2019	Friedrich-Ebert-Halle, Ludwigshafen, Germany	Retained GBU super-middleweight title; Won vacant IBO International super-middleweight title
32	Win	30–2	Przemyslaw Opalach	TKO	5 (12), 2:50	26 Jan 2019	Ufgauhalle, Karlsruhe, Germany	Won vacant GBU super-middleweight title
31	Win	29–2	Yusuf Kanguel	RTD	5 (10), 3:00	15 Sep 2018	Friedrich-Ebert-Halle, Ludwigshafen, Germany	Retained GBU Intercontinental super-middleweight title
30	Win	28–2	Ryno Liebenberg	TKO	6 (12), 2:57	17 Feb 2018	Arena Ludwigsburg, Ludwigsburg, Germany	Retained IBF Inter-Continental and GBU Intercontinental super-middleweight titles
29	Win	27–2	Gaston Alejandro Vega	KO	11 (12), 2:36	27 Oct 2017	Sport and Congress Center, Schwerin, Germany	Retained IBF Inter-Continental super-middleweight title; Won GBU Intercontinental super-middleweight title
28	Win	26–2	Norbert Nemesapati	UD	12	13 May 2017	Ufgauhalle, Karlsruhe, Germany	Retained IBF Inter-Continental super-middleweight title
27	Win	25–2	Mike Keta	KO	2 (12), 1:49	3 Dec 2016	Ufgauhalle, Karlsruhe, Germany	Won IBF Inter-Continental super-middleweight title
26	Win	24–2	Guillermo Ruben Andino	KO	6 (8), 2:13	1 Oct 2016	Jahnsportforum, Neubrandenburg, Germany	
25	Win	23–2	Wilmer Gonzalez	TKO	2 (6), 2:10	30 Jul 2016	First Direct Arena, Leeds, England	
24	Win	22–2	Crispulo Javier Andino	TKO	3 (8), 1:28	7 May 2016	Barclaycard Arena, Hamburg, Germany	
23	Loss	21–2	Giovanni De Carolis	TKO	11 (12), 0:32	9 Jan 2016	Baden-Arena, Offenburg, Germany	Lost WBA (Regular) and GBU super-middleweight titles
22	Win	21–1	Giovanni De Carolis	UD	12	17 Oct 2015	DM-Arena, Karlsruhe, Germany	Retained WBA interim and GBU super-middleweight titles
21	Win	20–1	Mauricio Reynoso	TKO	3 (12), 1:21	18 Jul 2015	Gerry Weber Stadium, Halle, Germany	Won vacant WBA interim and GBU super-middleweight titles
20	Win	19–1	Balazs Kelemen	TKO	9 (12), 0:51	21 Mar 2015	Rostock, Germany	Retained GBU Intercontinental super-middleweight title; Won vacant WBO Inter-Continental super-middleweight title
19	Win	18–1	Ionut Trandafir Ilie	RTD	2 (10), 3:00	13 Dec 2014	Zirkuszelt Messplatz, Karlsruhe, Germany	
18	Win	17–1	Olegs Fedotovs	TKO	7 (8), 1:26	22 Nov 2014	Echo Arena, Liverpool, England	
17	Win	16–1	Guram Natsulishvili	TKO	3 (12), 1:11	27 Sep 2014	Sparkassen-Arena, Kiel, Germany	Retained WBO Inter-Continental interim and GBU Intercontinental super-middleweight titles
16	Win	15–1	Slavisa Simeunovic	TKO	1 (12), 2:37	30 Aug 2014	Gerry Weber Stadium, Halle, Germany	Retained GBU Intercontinental super-middleweight title; Won WBO Inter-Continental interim super-middleweight title
15	Win	14–1	Peter Orlik	KO	2 (8), 2:53	13 Jun 2014	Bavaria Filmgelaende, Munich, Germany	
14	Win	13–1	Gheorghe Sabau	KO	3 (8), 2:57	7 Jun 2014	Sport and Congress Center, Schwerin, Germany	
13	Win	12–1	Chris Mafuta	TKO	2 (12), 1:20	10 May 2014	Europahalle, Karlsruhe, Germany	Won GBU Intercontinental super-middleweight title
12	Win	11–1	Misa Nikolic	TKO	1 (6), 2:00	28 Mar 2014	MBS Arena, Potsdam, Germany	
11	Win	10–1	Andrzej Soldra	TKO	1 (8), 2:18	1 Feb 2014	Okraglak Halle, Opole, Poland	
10	Win	9–1	Maciej Miszkin	TKO	3 (8), 2:37	23 Nov 2013	Jastrzebie Zdroj, Poland	
9	Win	8–1	Sasa Trninic	TKO	1 (4), 0:57	1 Nov 2013	ASV Halle, Dachau, Germany	
8	Win	7–1	Tiran Metz	MD	6	27 Jul 2013	Kugelbake-Halle, Cuxhaven, Germany	
7	Win	6–1	Matija Kelemen	TKO	1 (4)	6 Jul 2013	Vital-Fitt Sportcentrum, Nagyvenyim, Hungary	
6	Win	5–1	Lazar Rostas	KO	1 (4), 0:25	11 May 2013	Ufgauhalle, Karlsruhe, Germany	
5	Win	4–1	Attila Korda	KO	1 (4), 1:28	9 Mar 2013	CU Arena, Hamburg, Germany	
4	Win	3–1	Istvan Szucs	KO	3 (4), 1:37	15 Dec 2012	Rheinstetten, Germany	
3	Win	2–1	Bernd Hargesheimer	KO	1 (4), 1:17	22 Jul 2012	Karate-Club, Karlsruhe, Germany	
2	Loss	1–1	Roman Javoev	TKO	3 (6), 2:36	24 Mar 2012	Stadtwerke Arena Münster, Münster, Germany	
1	Win	1–0	Zdenek Siroky	KO	1 (4), 0:34	3 Dec 2011	Turnhalle Kirrlach, Kirrlach, Germany	

Regional boxing titles
Vacant Title last held by Robert Stieglitz	WBO super middleweight champion Inter-Continental title August 30, 2014 – July 18, 2015; Vacated	Vacant Title next held by Robin Krasniqi
New title	GBU super middleweight champion Intercontinental title May 10 - July 18, 2015 won world title	Vacant Title next held by Ismail Oezen
Vacant Title last held by Ismail Oezen	GBU super middleweight champion Intercontinental title October 27, 2017 - January 26, 2019 won world title	Vacant
Minor world boxing titles
Vacant Title last held by Roman Shkarupa	GBU super middleweight champion July 18, 2015 – January 9, 2016	Succeeded by Giovanni De Carolis
Vacant Title last held by Tyron Zeuge	GBU super middleweight champion January 26, 2019 – February 15, 2020; Stripped	Vacant Title last held by Karwan Al Bewani
Major world boxing titles
Vacant Title last held by Fedor Chudinov	WBA super-middleweight champion Interim title July 18, 2015 – January 9, 2016; Lost bid for regular title	Vacant Title next held by John Ryder
