= Daniele Scardina =

Italian boxer (born 1992)

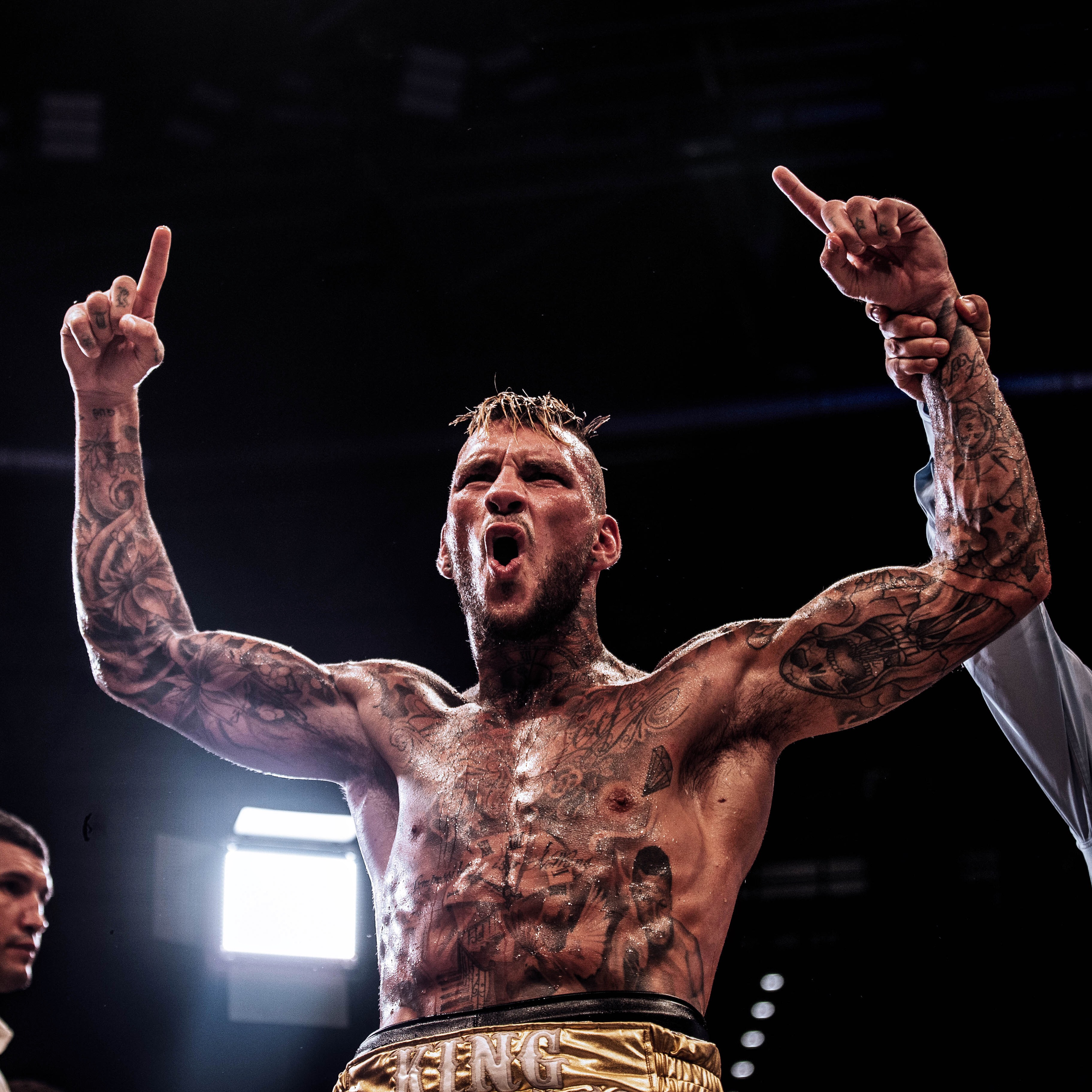

Personal information
- Nickname: King Toretto
- Nationality: Italian
- Born: 2 April 1992 (age 34) Rozzano, Lombardy, Italy
- Height: 6 ft 0 1/2 in (184 cm)
- Weight: Super-middleweight

Boxing career
- Stance: Orthodox

Boxing record
- Total fights: 21
- Wins: 20
- Win by KO: 16
- Losses: 1

Daniele Marco Scardina (born 2 April 1992) is an Italian former professional boxer.

== Career ==
Scardina was born in Rozzano, in the Milan metropolitan area. He made his pro debut at the age of 22 in Santo Domingo. In 2013 he won a Golden Glove and participated to the World serie of boxing as well as the Talent League.

In 2015 he and his brother Giovanni moved to the United States. Scardina trained at the 5th Street Gym in Miami with Dino Spencer.

In March 2019 he won the IBF International super-middleweight title, defeating Henri Kekalainen with a unanimous decision. In 2021 Scardina suffered his first professional defeat after being knocked out by fellow Italian boxer Giovanni De Carolis during the fifth round. In 2023 Scardina incurred in a serious head injury while sparring for his rematch with De Carolis. He announced his retirement from boxing shortly after.

== Personal life ==
Daniele Scardina is a Pentecostal.

== Professional boxing record ==
21 fights	20 wins	1 loss
By knockout	16	1
By decision	4	0

No.	Result	Record	Opponent	Type	Round, time	Date	Location	Notes
21	Loss	20–1	(Italy) Giovanni De Carolis	KO	5 (10), 2:55	13 May 2022	Allianz Cloud, Milan, Italy	Lost WBO Inter-Continental super-middleweight title
20	Win	20–0	(Germany) Juergen Doberstein	TKO	4 (10)	1 Oct 2021	Allianz Cloud, Milan, Italy	For vacant WBO Inter-Continental super-middleweight title
19	Win	19–0	(Spain) Cesar Nunez	KO	8 (12), 2:56	26 Feb 2021	Allianz Cloud, Milan, Italy	Won vacant European Union super-middleweight title
18	Win	18–0	(Belgium) Ilias Achergui	UD	10	25 Oct 2019	Allianz Cloud, Milan, Italy	Retained IBF International super-middleweight title
17	Win	17–0	(Italy) Alessandro Goddi	UD	10	28 Jun 2019	Allianz Cloud, Milan, Italy	Retained IBF International super-middleweight title
16	Win	16–0	(Finland) Henri Kekalainen	UD	10	8 Mar 2019	Superstudio, Milan, Italy	Won vacant IBF International super-middleweight title
15	Win	15–0	(Dominican Republic) David Antonio Nuez	TKO	3 (8), 0:15	10 Nov 2018	Hotel Jaragua, Santo Domingo, Dominican Republic	
14	Win	14–0	(Serbia) Alexander Bojic	KO	2 (6), 1:59	16 Jun 2018	Palasport Viale Liguria, Rozzano, Italy	
13	Win	13–0	(Dominican Republic) Melvin Betancourt	TKO	3 (10), 2:31	16 Dec 2017	(United States) Miami Airport Convention Center, Miami, Florida, US	
12	Win	12–0	(Ukraine) Andrii Velikovskyi	UD	6	24 Jun 2017	Teatro Nuovo, Milan, Italy	
11	Win	11–0	(Dominican Republic) Wilmer Mejia	RTD	2 (9), 3:00	31 Mar 2017	Karibe Convention Center, Pétion-Ville, Haiti	Won vacant WBA Fedecaribe super-middleweight title
10	Win	10–0	(Hungary) Aron Csipak	TKO	5 (6), 1:23	2 Dec 2016	Crown Plaza, San Donato Milanese, Italy	
9	Win	9–0	(United States) Rashad Jones	TKO	2 (4), 2:26	5 Nov 2016	(United States) Club Cinema, Pompano Beach, Florida, US	
8	Win	8–0	(Dominican Republic) David Montero	TKO	2 (6), 1:33	27 Aug 2016	Club Rubén Espino, Santiago de los Caballeros, Dominican Republic	
7	Win	7–0	(Italy) Christian Bozzoni	TKO	3 (4), 2:59	21 Jul 2016	Teatro Principe, Milan, Italy	
6	Win	6–0	(United States) Steven Crowfield	TKO	3 (4), 0:31	14 May 2016	(United States) PA Sheet Metal Workers Hall, Philadelphia, Pennsylvania, US	
5	Win	5–0	(Dominican Republic) Francisco Suero	TKO	3 (4), 2:01	12 Feb 2016	Coliseo Pedro Julio Nolasco, La Romana, Dominican Republic	
4	Win	4–0	(Dominican Republic) Elias Ramirez	TKO	2 (6), 2:08	6 Feb 2016	Cancha Club Luis Veras, Santiago de los Caballeros, Dominican Republic	
3	Win	3–0	(Dominican Republic) Victor Moya	KO	1 (4), 0:52	20 Nov 2015	Casa de los Clubes, Santo Domingo, Dominican Republic	
2	Win	2–0	(Dominican Republic) Ramon Jimenez	TKO	1 (6), 2:51	22 Oct 2015	Casa de los Clubes, Santo Domingo, Dominican Republic	
1	Win	1–0	(Dominican Republic) Wilson Jimenez	TKO	2 (4), 1:43	4 Sep 2015	Gimnasio Wilfredo Rivera, La Victoria, Dominican Republic	
