= Fernando Castañeda =

Mexican boxer (born 1989)

Personal information
- Nickname: Huracán
- Born: Fernando Castañeda; 8 January 1989 (age 37) Aguascalientes, Mexico
- Height: 5 ft 10 in (178 cm)
- Weight: Welterweight; Light Welterweight

Boxing career
- Reach: 72 in (183 cm)
- Stance: Counterpuncher

Boxing record
- Total fights: 41
- Wins: 26
- Win by KO: 17
- Losses: 14
- Draws: 1
- No contests: 0

Fernando Castañeda (born 8 January 1989) is a Mexican professional boxer and the current WBC Youth World Light Welterweight Championship. Castañeda is promoted by current WBC Champion, Mexican Saúl Álvarez' company Canelo Promotions.

== Professional career ==
In July 2011, Fernando took out world title contender Fidel Muñoz to win the WBC Youth World Light Welterweight Championship.

=== WBA Light Welterweight Championship ===
Castañeda will fight Johan Pérez for the interim WBA Light Welterweight title.
