= Stefan Härtel =

German boxer (born 1988)

Stefan Haertel
Personal information
- Nationality: German
- Born: 6 February 1988 (age 38) Lauchhammer, Bezirk Cottbus, East Germany
- Height: 6 ft 0.5 in (1.84 m)
- Weight: Super-middleweight, Light-heavyweight

Boxing career
- Reach: 74 in (188 cm)
- Stance: Orthodox

Boxing record
- Total fights: 20
- Wins: 19
- Win by KO: 3
- Losses: 1

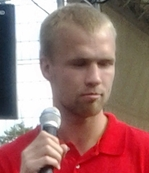
Stefan Härtel

Stefan Härtel (born 6 February 1988) is a German professional boxer who held the European super-middleweight title in 2019. As an amateur, Härtel represented Germany at the 2012 Olympics, reaching the quarter-finals of the middleweight bracket.

== Amateur career ==
=== World Amateur Boxing Championship results ===
2011

- Defeated (Turkey) Adem Kılıççı 13-10
- Defeated (Georgia (country)) Jaba Khositashvili 22-6
- Lost to (Japan) Ryōta Murata 15-18

=== Olympic Games results ===
2012

- Defeated (Puerto Rico) Enrique Collazo 18-10
- Defeated (Republic of Ireland) Darren O'Neill 19-12
- Lost to (United Kingdom) Anthony Ogogo 10-15

== Professional career ==
Härtel won the European super-middleweight title by defeating defending champion Robin Krasniqi via unanimous decision at Stadthalle in Magdeburg on 11 May 2019.

In his next fight, he claimed the vacant WBO Intercontinental super-middleweight title when his opponent, David Zegarra, retired at the end of the fifth round at Messe Arena in Halle on 16 November 2019.

== Professional boxing record ==
20 fights	19 wins	1 loss
By knockout	3	0
By decision	15	1
By disqualification	1	0

No.	Result	Record	Opponent	Type	Round, time	Date	Location	Notes
20	Win	19–1	David Zegarra	RTD	5 (12), 3:00	16 Nov 2019	Messe Arena, Halle, Germany	Won vacant WBO Inter-Continental super-middleweight title
19	Win	18–1	Robin Krasniqi	UD	12	11 May 2019	Stadthalle, Magdeburg, Germany	Won European super-middleweight title
18	Win	17–1	Emmanuel Feuzeu	UD	8	2 Jun 2018	weeArena, Bad Tölz, Germany	
17	Win	16–1	Dominik Landgraf	TKO	4 (8), 1:52	21 Apr 2018	Estrel Hotel, Neukölln, Germany	
16	Loss	15–1	Adam Deines	SD	10	3 Mar 2018	Stadthalle, Weißenfels, Germany	For vacant German light-heavyweight title
15	Win	15–0	Viktor Polyakov	MD	10	7 Oct 2017	Hanns-Martin-Schleyer-Halle, Stuttgart, Germany	
14	Win	14–0	Patrick Mendy	UD	10	17 Jun 2017	Rittal Arena, Wetzlar, Germany	
13	Win	13–0	Tomasz Gargula	TKO	8 (10), 1:52	21 Jan 2017	Struer Arena, Struer, Denmark	
12	Win	12–0	Adasat Rodriguez	UD	10	5 Nov 2016	MBS Arena, Potsdam, Germany	
11	Win	11–0	Mateo Damian Veron	UD	8	16 Jul 2016	Max-Schmeling-Halle, Berlin, Germany	
10	Win	10–0	Ruslan Schelev	UD	8	7 May 2016	Barclaycard Arena, Hamburg, Germany	
9	Win	9–0	Tobias Webb	UD	8	12 Mar 2016	Jahnsportforum, Neubrandenburg, Germany	
8	Win	8–0	Jozsef Racz	UD	6	9 Jan 2016	Baden-Arena, Offenburg, Germany	
7	Win	7–0	Ivan Jukic	UD	6	5 Sep 2015	EnergieVerbund Arena, Dresden, Germany	
6	Win	6–0	Maurice Possiti	UD	6	18 Jul 2015	Gerry Weber Stadion, Halle, Germany	
5	Win	5–0	Volodymyr Borovskyy	UD	6	21 Mar 2015	Rostock, Germany	
4	Win	4–0	Baptiste Castegnaro	UD	6	21 Feb 2015	O2 World Arena, Berlin, Germany	
3	Win	3–0	Zoltan Surman	UD	6	6 Dec 2014	EWE-Arena, Oldenburg, Germany	
2	Win	2–0	Leo Tchoula	DQ	4 (6), 2:52	27 Sep 2014	Sparkassen-Arena, Kiel, Germany	Tchoula disqualified for repeated inactivity
1	Win	1–0	Olegs Fedotovs	UD	6	16 Aug 2014	Messehalle, Erfurt, Germany	

Sporting positions
Regional boxing titles
Preceded by Robin Krasniqi	European super-middleweight champion 11 May 2019 – 2019; Vacated	Vacant Title next held by Lerrone Richards
