= Karo Murat =

Armenian-German professional boxer (born 1983)

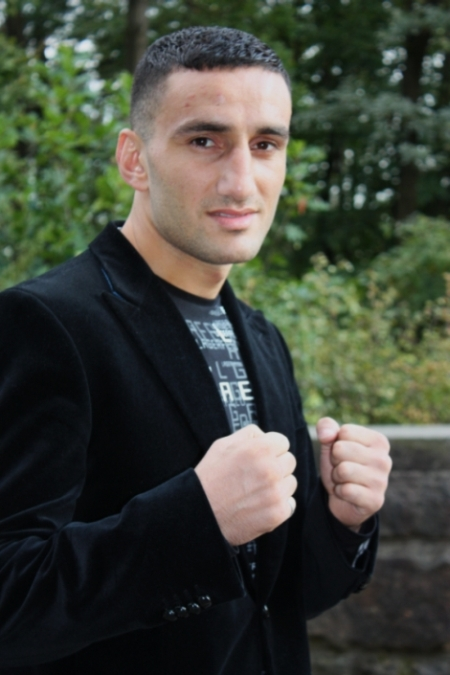
- Murat in 2008

Personal information
- Nationality: Armenian; German
- Born: Karapet Muradyan; 2 September 1983 (age 43) Yerevan, Armenian SSR, Soviet Union
- Height: 5 ft 10 1/2 in (1.79 m)
- Weight: Super-middleweight; Light-heavyweight

Boxing career
- Reach: 70 in (178 cm)
- Stance: Orthodox

Boxing record
- Total fights: 40
- Wins: 35
- Win by KO: 24
- Losses: 4
- Draws: 1

Karapet Muradyan (Armenian: Կարապետ Մուրադյան; born 2 September 1983), best known as Karo Murat (Armenian: Կարո Մուրատ), is a German-Armenian professional boxer who held the IBO light-heavyweight title in 2018. He also held the European super-middleweight title from 2008 to 2009 and the light-heavyweight version in 2017.

== Professional career ==
=== Early stages and European super-middleweight champion ===
Murat made his professional debut in Hessen, Germany on 23 September 2006 defeating Matus Sestak.

On 16 February 2008, he defeated Sergey Kharchenko at the Nuremberg Arena to lift the EBU-EE super middleweight title via stoppage in the 10th round.

In his next fight, Murat travelled to Neubrandenburg to fight for the full European belt against Cristian Sanavia on 12 April 2008, winning by unanimous decision.

A first defence in Bielefeld on 20 September 2008 resulted in a majority points win over Spain's Gabriel Campillo. He then met Sanavia in a rematch on 28 February 2009, again in Neubrandenburg. Murat stopped Sanavia in the 10th round to register a second successful defence of the title.

=== Move to light-heavyweight ===
Murat moved up to light-heavyweight and fought Serhiy Demchenko to win the vacant WBO Inter-continental light-heavyweight title via unanimous decision on 29 August 2009 in Halle.

His first defence against Guyana's Sean Corbin resulted in a second round stoppage win on 30 January 2010. Murat successfully defended his title once more on 1 May 2010 beating Tommy Karpency over 12 rounds, knocking him down in the second, in Oldenburg, Germany.

On 18 September 2010, Murat faced Nathan Cleverly in a WBO light-heavyweight title eliminator. The bout was waved off by the referee as the 10th round was about to start on the advice of the ringside doctor.

He rebounded from the defeat on 12 February 2011 with an eight round points win over Christian Cruz and followed this on 7 May 2011 by winning the IBF Inter-continental title against American boxer Otis Griffin with an 11th round stoppage. He made his first defence of the title in a rematch against Gabriel Campillo on 1 October 2011, with the fight ending in a draw.

=== IBF light-heavyweight title challenge ===
Murat faced the IBF light-heavyweight champion Bernard Hopkins on 26 October 2013 in Atlantic City, USA, and lost by unanimous decision.

=== European light-heavyweight champion ===
On 1 July 2017, he beat the previously undefeated Dominic Bösel by 11th round technical knockout to win the vacant European light-heavyweight title.

=== IBO light-heavyweight title ===
Murat defeated Travis Reeves by technical knockout in the 12th round to win the vacant IBO light heavyweight title on 24 March 2018.

He lost the title in his first defense to Sven Fornling at Alsterdorfer Sporthalle in Hamburg, Germany, on 15 December 2018. He was knocked to the canvas in the first round and floored his opponent in the 12th round. Murat was deducted a point in round 11 for rabbit punches and Fornling went on to win via unanimous decision.

== Professional boxing record ==
| 40 fights | 35 wins | 4 losses |
|---|---|---|
| By knockout | 24 | 2 |
| By decision | 11 | 2 |
| Draws | 1 | |

| No. | Result | Record | Opponent | Type | Round, time | Date | Location | Notes |
|---|---|---|---|---|---|---|---|---|
| 40 | Win | 35–4–1 | Norbert Dabrowski | TKO | 10 (10), 1:52 | 19 Oct 2022 | Prime Hall Complex, Yerevan, Armenia | |
| 39 | Win | 34–4–1 | Adnan Deronja | RTD | 3 (8), 3:00 | 6 Jun 2022 | Universum Gym, Hamburg, Germany | |
| 38 | Win | 33–4–1 | Norbert Szekeres | KO | 6 (8), 1:15 | 21 May 2022 | Inselparkhalle, Wilhelmsburg, Germany | |
| 37 | Loss | 32–4–1 | Sven Fornling | UD | 12 | 15 Dec 2018 | Alsterdorfer Sporthalle, Hamburg, Germany | Lost IBO light-heavyweight title |
| 36 | Win | 32–3–1 | Travis Reeves | TKO | 12 (12), 1:52 | 24 Mar 2018 | Inselparkhalle, Wilhelmsburg, Germany | Won vacant IBO light-heavyweight title |
| 35 | Win | 31–3–1 | Dominic Boesel | TKO | 11 (12), 2:26 | 1 Jul 2017 | Ballsport Arena, Dresden, Germany | Won vacant European light-heavyweight title |
| 34 | Win | 30–3–1 | Yevgeni Makhteienko | TKO | 12 (12), 2:46 | 17 Sep 2016 | Goeppi, Germany | Won vacant WBA Inter-Continental light-heavyweight title. |
| 33 | Win | 29–3–1 | Esteban Hillman Tababary | TKO | 1 (10), 2:50 | 4 Jun 2016 | Autohaus Duerkop, Kassel, Germany | |
| 32 | Win | 28–3–1 | Aleksandar Todorovic | PTS | 6 | 13 Feb 2016 | ECB Boxgym, Hamburg, Germany | |
| 31 | Loss | 27–3–1 | Sullivan Barrera | KO | 5 (12), 0:25 | 12 Dec 2015 | Civic Auditorium, Glendale, California, US | IBF light-heavyweight title eliminator |
| 30 | Win | 27–2–1 | Benjamin Simon | TKO | 7 (12), 2:18 | 25 Apr 2015 | Columbiahalle, Berlin, Germany | Won vacant IBF International light-heavyweight title |
| 29 | Win | 26–2–1 | Leo Tchoula | TKO | 4 (10), 2:48 | 31 Oct 2014 | Kugelbake-Halle, Cuxhaven, Germany | |
| 28 | Loss | 25–2–1 | Bernard Hopkins | UD | 12 | 26 Oct 2013 | Boardwalk Hall, Atlantic City, New Jersey, US | For IBF light-heavyweight title |
| 27 | Win | 25–1–1 | Sandro Siproshvili | TKO | 7 (8), 2:21 | 2 Jun 2012 | Herning Kongrescenter, Herning, Denmark | |
| 26 | Draw | 24–1–1 | Gabriel Campillo | SD | 12 | 1 Oct 2011 | Jahnsportforum, Neubrandenburg, Germany | Retained IBF Inter-Continental light-heavyweight title |
| 25 | Win | 24–1 | Otis Griffin | TKO | 11 (12), 2:59 | 7 May 2011 | Jahnsportforum, Neubrandenburg, Germany | Won vacant IBF Inter-Continental light-heavyweight title |
| 24 | Win | 23–1 | Christian Cruz | UD | 8 | 12 Feb 2011 | RWE Rhein-Ruhr Sporthalle, Mülheim, Germany | |
| 23 | Loss | 22–1 | Nathan Cleverly | TKO | 9 (12), 3:00 | 18 Sep 2010 | LG Arena, Birmingham, England | |
| 22 | Win | 22–0 | Tommy Karpency | UD | 12 | 1 May 2010 | Weser-Ems-Halle, Oldenburg, Germany | Retained WBO Inter-Continental light-heavyweight title |
| 21 | Win | 21–0 | Shawn Corbin | TKO | 2 (12), 2:41 | 30 Jan 2010 | Jahnsportforum, Neubrandenburg, Germany | Retained WBO Inter-Continental light-heavyweight title |
| 20 | Win | 20–0 | Serhiy Demchenko | UD | 12 | 29 Aug 2009 | Gerry Weber Stadium, Halle, Germany | Won vacant WBO Inter-Continental light-heavyweight title |
| 19 | Win | 19–0 | Cristian Sanavia | TKO | 10 (12), 0:05 | 28 Feb 2009 | Jahnsportforum, Neubrandenburg, Germany | Retained European super-middleweight title |
| 18 | Win | 18–0 | Gabriel Campillo | MD | 12 | 20 Sep 2008 | Seidensticker Halle, Bielefeld, Germany | Retained European super-middleweight title |
| 17 | Win | 17–0 | Cristian Sanavia | UD | 12 | 12 Apr 2008 | Jahnsportforum, Neubrandenburg, Germany | Won European super-middleweight title |
| 16 | Win | 16–0 | Sergey Kharchenko | TKO | 10 (12), 1:20 | 16 Feb 2008 | Nuremberg Arena, Nuremberg, Germany | Won vacant European External super-middleweight title |
| 15 | Win | 15–0 | Emiliano Cayetano | TKO | 7 (8), 2:07 | 29 Dec 2007 | Seidensticker Halle, Bielefeld, Germany | |
| 14 | Win | 14–0 | Gabor Balogh | TKO | 1 (8) | 24 Nov 2007 | Stadthalle, Steyr, Austria | |
| 13 | Win | 13–0 | Szabolcs Rimovszky | KO | 2 (8), 1:04 | 15 Sep 2007 | Frankie`s BF Arena, Oberpullendorf, Austria | |
| 12 | Win | 12–0 | Jermain Mackey | UD | 8 | 18 Aug 2007 | Max Schmeling Halle, Berlin, Germany | |
| 11 | Win | 11–0 | Sergey Botnikov | KO | 4 (4), 1:50 | 30 Jun 2007 | Olympisky Sport Hall, Moscow, Russia | |
| 10 | Win | 10–0 | Mustapha Stini | RTD | 2 (6), 0:24 | 26 May 2007 | Jako Arena, Bamberg, Germany | |
| 9 | Win | 9–0 | Nicolas Perillo | UD | 6 | 8 May 2007 | Pabellon San Jose, Castilla-La Mancha, Spain | |
| 8 | Win | 8–0 | Sergey Gribkov | UD | 6 | 24 Mar 2007 | Yunost, Kaliningrad, Russia | |
| 7 | Win | 7–0 | Pavels Lotahs | UD | 6 | 3 Mar 2007 | Stadthalle, Rostock, Germany | |
| 6 | Win | 6–0 | Mirko Sinovcic | TKO | 1 (6) | 17 Feb 2007 | Universal Hall, Berlin, Germany | |
| 5 | Win | 5–0 | Yves Romainville | KO | 1 (6), 1:41 | 20 Jan 2007 | St. Jakob Halle, Basel, Switzerland | |
| 4 | Win | 4–0 | Biagio Patera | UD | 4 | 16 Dec 2006 | BigBox, Kempten, Germany | |
| 3 | Win | 3–0 | Petr Rykala | TKO | 1 (4) | 18 Nov 2006 | Stadthalle, Steyr, Austria | |
| 2 | Win | 2–0 | Tanju Guenes | KO | 1 (4), 1:23 | 4 Nov 2006 | RWE Rhein-Ruhr Sporthalle, Mülheim, Germany | |
| 1 | Win | 1–0 | Matus Sestak | KO | 1 (4), 1:48 | 23 Sep 2006 | Karl Eckel Halle, Hattersheim am Main, Germany | |

Sporting positions
Regional boxing titles
| Vacant Title last held by Kreshnik Qato | EBU External super-middleweight champion 16 February – 12 April 2008; Won full title | Vacant Title next held by Stanislav Kashtanov |
| Preceded by Cristian Sanavia | European super-middleweight champion 12 April 2008 – March 2009; Vacated | Vacant Title next held by Brian Magee |
| Vacant Title last held by Mariano Plotinsky | WBO Inter-Continental light-heavyweight champion 29 August 2009 – 2010; Vacated | Vacant Title next held by Dmitry Sukhotsky |
| Vacant Title last held by Serhiy Demchenko | IBF Inter-Continental light-heavyweight champion 7 May 2011 – 2012; Vacated | Vacant Title next held by Robert Woge |
| Vacant Title last held by Harry Simon | IBF International light-heavyweight champion 25 April 2015 – December 2015; Vacated | Vacant Title next held by Trent Broadhurst |
| Vacant Title last held by Robert Stieglitz | European light-heavyweight champion 1 July 2017 – 2018; Vacated | Vacant Title next held by Dominic Boesel |
Minor world boxing titles
| Vacant Title last held by Igor Mikhalkin | IBO light-heavyweight champion 24 March – 15 December 2018 | Succeeded by Sven Fornling |
