= Dominic Boesel =

German boxer (born 1989)

Personal information
- Nationality: German
- Born: 24 October 1989 (age 36) Naumburg, East Germany
- Height: 6 ft 1 in (185 cm)
- Weight: Light-heavyweight

Boxing career
- Stance: Orthodox

Boxing record
- Total fights: 35
- Wins: 32
- Win by KO: 12
- Losses: 3

Dominic Boesel (German: Dominic Bösel, born 24 October 1989) is a German professional boxer. He is a two-time IBO light-heavyweight champion. Boesel has held the WBA interim and European light-heavyweight titles.

== Professional career ==
Boesel made his professional debut on 20 November 2010, scoring a first-round technical knockout (TKO) victory over Patrick Baumann at the Freiberger Arena in Dresden, Germany.

After compiling a record of 26 wins and one loss, he challenged Serhiy Demchenko on 3 March 2018 for the vacant European light-heavyweight title at Stadthalle in Weissenfels, winning the title by unanimous decision. Two judges scored the bout 116–112 and the third scored it 118–110.

On 16 November 2019, he challenged IBO light-heavyweight champion Sven Fornling at the Halle Messe Arena in Halle, Germany, with the vacant WBA interim title also on the line. Boesel won the fight via 11th round TKO.

He lost both titles to Robin Krasniqi when he was knocked out in the third round of their fight at GETEC Arena in Magdeburg on 10 October 2020.

Almost exactly a year later, on 9 October 2021, Boesel regained the IBO title in a rematch with Krasniqi at the same venue, winning by split decision.

He faced Gilberto Ramírez in a final eliminator for a shot at the WBA title at Toyota Arena in Ontario, California, USA, on 14 May 2022. Boesel was knocked out in the fourth round.

== Professional boxing record ==
35 fights	32 wins	3 losses
By knockout	12	3
By decision	20	0

No.	Result	Record	Opponent	Type	Round, time	Date	Location	Notes
35	Loss	32–3	Gilberto Ramírez	KO	4 (12), 1:33	14 May 2022	Toyota Arena, Ontario, California, U.S.	
34	Win	32–2	Robin Krasniqi	SD	12	9 Oct 2021	GETEC Arena, Magdeburg, Germany	Won IBO light-heavyweight title
33	Win	31–2	Ondrej Budera	SD	8	22 May 2021	Campus Sava, Ptuj, Slovenia	
32	Loss	30–2	Robin Krasniqi	KO	3 (12), 2:25	10 Oct 2020	GETEC Arena, Magdeburg, Germany	Lost WBA interim and IBO light-heavyweight titles
31	Win	30–1	Sven Fornling	TKO	11 (12), 1:12	16 Nov 2019	Messe Arena, Halle, Germany	Won vacant WBA interim and IBO light-heavyweight titles
30	Win	29–1	Timy Shala	TKO	8 (12), 0:36	13 Apr 2019	Erdgas Arena, Halle, Germany	Retained European light-heavyweight title
29	Win	28–1	Enrico Kölling	UD	12	27 Oct 2018	Stadthalle, Weissenfels, Germany	Retained European light-heavyweight title
28	Win	27–1	Serhiy Demchenko	UD	12	3 Mar 2018	Stadthalle, Weissenfels, Germany	Won vacant European light-heavyweight title
27	Win	26–1	Alis Sijaric	UD	10	30 Sep 2017	Maritim Hotel, Magdeburg, Germany	
26	Win	25–1	Robert Blazo	RTD	2 (8), 3:00	17 Sep 2017	Hospudka Eden, Ústí nad Labem, Czech Republic	
25	Loss	24–1	Karo Murat	TKO	11 (12), 2:26	1 Jul 2017	Ballsport Arena, Dresden, Germany	For vacant European light-heavyweight title
24	Win	24–0	Sami Enbom	TKO	6 (12), 2:59	18 Mar 2017	Arena Leipzig, Leipzig, Germany	Retained WBA Continental and WBO Inter-Continental light-heavyweight titles; Won vacant IBF Inter-Continental light-heavyweight title
23	Win	23–0	Tony Averlant	UD	12	17 Sep 2016	Stadthalle, Weissenfels, Germany	Retained WBA Continental and WBO Inter-Continental light-heavyweight titles
22	Win	22–0	Denis Liebau	TKO	11 (12), 1:34	30 Apr 2016	Jahrhunderthalle, Spergau, Germany	Retained WBA Continental and WBO Inter-Continental light-heavyweight titles
21	Win	21–0	Balazs Kelemen	UD	12	23 Jan 2016	Erdgas Arena, Halle, Germany	Retained WBO Inter-Continental light-heavyweight title; Won vacant WBA Continental light-heavyweight title
20	Win	20–0	Maximiliano Jorge Gomez	RTD	8 (12), 3:00	19 Sep 2015	Belantis-Arena, Leipzig, Germany	Retained WBO Inter-Continental light-heavyweight title
19	Win	19–0	Norbert Dąbrowski	UD	12	2 May 2015	Sparkassen-Arena, Jena, Germany	Retained WBO Inter-Continental light-heavyweight title
18	Win	18–0	Timy Shala	UD	10	7 Mar 2015	Maritim Hotel, Magdeburg, Germany	Retained WBO Inter-Continental light-heavyweight title
17	Win	17–0	Mohamed Merah	TKO	2 (10), 2:58	20 Dec 2014	Ballhaus Forum, Munich, Germany	Retained WBO Inter-Continental light-heavyweight title
16	Win	16–0	Daniel Regi	UD	10	26 Jul 2014	Anhalt Arena, Dessau, Germany	Retained WBO Inter-Continental light-heavyweight title
15	Win	15–0	Miguel Velozo	MD	10	28 Mar 2014	MBS Arena, Potsdam, Germany	Won vacant WBO Inter-Continental light-heavyweight title
14	Win	14–0	Attila Tibor Nagy	TKO	1 (8)	26 Jan 2014	Sportova hala MSO, Štúrovo, Slovakia	
13	Win	13–0	Mirco Ricci	MD	10	19 Oct 2013	Messehalle, Leipzig, Germany	Retained WBO Youth light-heavyweight title
12	Win	12–0	Chris Mafuta	UD	10	28 Jun 2013	Maritim Hotel, Halle, Germany	Retained WBO Youth light-heavyweight title
11	Win	11–0	Harro Stein	UD	10	2 Mar 2013	MBS Arena, Potsdam, Germany	Won vacant WBO Youth light-heavyweight title
10	Win	10–0	Jozsef Molnar	TKO	1 (6), 0:51	1 Dec 2012	Anhalt Arena, Dessau, Germany	
9	Win	9–0	Zoltan Kiss Jr	TKO	3 (8), 2:55	16 Nov 2012	Maritim Hotel, Magdeburg, Germany	
8	Win	8–0	Vladimir Tazik	UD	6	6 Oct 2012	Palace of Sports, Kyiv, Ukraine	
7	Win	7–0	Steve Kroekel	UD	6	16 May 2012	Brandenburg Halle, Frankfurt, Germany	
6	Win	6–0	Gyorgy Marosi	PTS	6	24 Mar 2012	Tabor Hall, Maribor, Slovenia	
5	Win	5–0	Dominik Ameri	KO	3 (6), 1:55	7 Jan 2012	Maritim Hotel, Magdeburg, Germany	
4	Win	4–0	Rabie Ben Lakhbhar Inoubli	UD	4	21 Oct 2011	Brandenburg Halle, Frankfurt, Germany	
3	Win	3–0	Marko Angermann	UD	4	9 Apr 2011	GETEC Arena, Magdeburg, Germany	
2	Win	2–0	Josef Obeslo	PTS	4	18 Feb 2011	Arena Stožice, Ljubljana, Slovenia	
1	Win	1–0	Patrick Baumann	KO	1 (4), 1:46	20 Nov 2010	EnergieVerbund Arena, Dresden, Germany	

== See also ==
- List of world light-heavyweight boxing champions

Sporting positions
Regional boxing titles
Vacant Title last held by Igor Mikhalkin	WBO Inter-Continental light-heavyweight champion 28 March 2014 – June 2017	Vacant Title next held by Anthony Yarde
Vacant Title last held by Robin Krasniqi	WBA Continental light-heavyweight champion 23 January 2016 – June 2017	Vacant Title next held by Craig Richards
Vacant Title last held by Erik Skoglund	IBF Inter-Continental light-heavyweight champion 18 March 2017 – June 2017	Vacant Title next held by Adam Deines
Vacant Title last held by Karo Murat	European light-heavyweight champion 3 March 2019 – 2019; Vacated	Vacant
Minor world boxing titles
Inaugural champion	WBO Youth light-heavyweight champion 2 March 2013 – December 2013; Vacated	Vacant Title next held by Enrico Kölling
Preceded by Sven Fornling	IBO light-heavyweight champion 16 November 2019 – 10 October 2020	Succeeded by Robin Krasniqi
Major world boxing titles
Vacant Title last held by Jean Pascal	WBA light-heavyweight champion Interim title 16 November 2019 – 10 October 2020	Succeeded by Robin Krasniqi
