= Ángel Ayala =

Mexican boxer (born 2000)

Personal information
- Nickname: Camaleón ("Chameleon")
- Born: Ángel Ayala Lardizabal; 11 May 2000 (age 26) Texcoco de Mora, Mexico City, Mexico
- Height: 5 ft 6 in (168 cm)
- Weight: Flyweight

Boxing career
- Reach: 66 in (168 cm)
- Stance: Orthodox

Boxing record
- Total fights: 21
- Wins: 20
- Win by KO: 9
- Losses: 1

Ángel Ayala Lardizabal (born 11 May 2000) is a Mexican professional boxer who held the International Boxing Federation (IBF) flyweight title from 2024 to 2025.

== Professional career ==
Ayala made his professional debut against Christopher Celaya on 7 March 2019. He won the fight by a second-round technical knockout. Ayala amassed an 8–0 record before being booked to face Luis Castro for the vacant WBC FECARBOX flyweight title on 16 October 2020. He captured the first major title of his professional career by a second-round knockout. Ayala made his first regional title defense against Jeovani Gonzalez on 22 January 2022, on the undercard of the Hector Flores and Juan Carlos Parra light flyweight bout. He won the fight by a dominant unanimous decision, with all three judges awarding Ayala a 100–88 scorecard.

Ayala faced the overmatched Brandon "Gallardo" Vargas (3–2–1) for the vacant ABF Continental Americas flyweight title on 30 April 2021. He won the fight by technical decision. The bout was stopped after the seventh round, due to rainfall.

His eleven-fight undefeated streak earned Ayala the chance to face Cristofer Rosales in a WBC flyweight title eliminator. It was scheduled as the main event of an Azteca 7 broadcast card, which took place at Centro de Espectáculos del Recinto Ferial in Metepec, Mexico on 9 April 2022. He won the fight by unanimous decision. Two of the judges scored the fight 116–111 in his favor, while the third judge awarded him a much wider 120–107 scorecard.

Ayala faced Miguel Angel Herrera on 23 July 2022, once again in the main event of an Azteca 7 broadcast card. He needed just 79 seconds to hand Herrera the first stoppage loss of his career. The bout was stopped due to a cut on Herrera's left eyelid.

Ayala faced the former IBF light flyweight champion Felix Alvarado in an IBF flyweight title eliminator on 14 October 2023. He won the fight by unanimous decision, with all three judges awarding him a 114–113 scorecard.

He knocked out Dave Apolinario in the sixth round to win the vacant IBF flyweight title at Restaurante Arroyo in Mexico City, on 9 August 2024.

Ayala lost the title in his first defense against Masamichi Yabuki at Aichi Sky Expo in Tokoname, Japan, on 29 March 2025, going down by 12th round stoppage.

== Professional boxing record ==
21 fights	20 wins	1 loss
By knockout	9	1
By decision	11	0

No.	Result	Record	Opponent	Type	Round, time	Date	Location	Notes
21	Win	20–1	Ruben Lezama Gonzalez	UD	10	12 Sep 2026	Gimnasio Miguel Hidalgo, Puebla, Mexico	
20	Win	19–1	Jayson Mama	KO	5 (10), 0:51	21 May 2026	Arena Ciudad de Mexico, Mexico City, Mexico	
19	Loss	18–1	Masamichi Yabuki	TKO	12 (12), 1:54	29 Mar 2025	Aichi Sky Expo, Tokoname, Japan	Lost IBF flyweight title
18	Win	18–0	Dave Apolinario	KO	6 (12), 2:06	9 Aug 2024	Restaurante Arroyo, Mexico City, Mexico	Won vacant IBF flyweight title
17	Win	17–0	Felix Alvarado	UD	12	14 Oct 2023	Poliforum Zamna, Merida, Mexico	
16	Win	16–0	Luis Rodriguez Rodriguez	UD	8	3 Apr 2023	Merida, Mexico	
15	Win	15–0	Miguel Angel Herrera	TKO	1 (10), 1:19	23 Jul 2022	Gimnasio TV Azteca, Mexico City, Mexico	
14	Win	14–0	Cristofer Rosales	UD	12	9 Apr 2022	Centro de Espectáculos del Recinto Ferial, Metepec, Mexico	
13	Win	13–0	Juan Alejo Zuniga	KO	2 (10), 2:15	6 Aug 2021	Arena Adolfo López Mateos, Tlalnepantla de Baz, Mexico	
12	Win	12–0	Brandon Gallardo Vargas	TD	7 (10)	30 Apr 2021	The Fives Hotel, Playa del Carmen, Mexico	Won vacant ABF Inter-Continental flyweight title; TD: Stopped due to rainfall
11	Win	11–0	Jeovani Gonzalez	UD	10	22 Jan 2021	Grand Hotel, Tijuana, Mexico	Won vacant WBC FECARBOX flyweight title
10	Win	10–0	Juan Vazquez	UD	8	4 Dec 2020	Las Lomas, Monterrey, Mexico	
9	Win	9–0	Luis Castro	KO	2 (10), 2:25	16 Oct 2020	Jardines del Pedregal, Hermosillo, Mexico	
8	Win	8–0	Eduardo Garcia Balderas	KO	1 (6), 2:48	11 Sep 2020	Deportivo Tlalli, Tlalnepantla de Baz, Mexico	
7	Win	7–0	Omar Periban	TKO	5 (8), 2:04	28 Feb 2020	Deportivo Tlalli, Tlalnepantla de Baz, Mexico	
6	Win	6–0	Luis Cerrito Hernandez	UD	6	6 Dec 2019	Salon Marbet Plus, Ciudad Nezahualcóyotl, Mexico	
5	Win	5–0	Hugo Hernandez	UD	8	31 Oct 2019	Rodeo Santa Fe, Tlalnepantla de Baz, Mexico	
4	Win	4–0	Adrian Luna Maya	TKO	3 (4), 2:20	7 Sep 2019	Ring Side Arena, Mexico City, Mexico	
3	Win	3–0	Daniel Romero Garcia	UD	6	20 Jul 2019	Ring Side Arena, Mexico City, Mexico	
2	Win	2–0	Cristian Gonzalez Hernandez	SD	6	24 May 2019	Centro Civico, Ecatepec de Morelos, Mexico	
1	Win	1–0	Christopher Celaya	TKO	2 (4), 0:44	7 Mar 2019	Foro Zina, Zinacantepec, Mexico	

== See also ==
- List of Mexican boxing world champions
- List of world flyweight boxing champions

Sporting positions
Regional boxing titles
Vacant Title last held by Carlos Licona	WBC FECARBOX flyweight champion 22 January 2021 – 2022; Vacated	Vacant Title next held by Sergio Mendoza Cordova
Vacant Title last held by Matthew Griego	ABF Inter-Continental flyweight champion 30 April 2021 – 2022; Vacated	Vacant Title next held by Josue Morales
World boxing titles
Vacant Title last held by Jesse Rodriguez	IBF flyweight champion 9 August 2024 – 29 March 2025	Succeeded by Masamichi Yabuki
