= Dave Apolinario =

Filipino boxer (born 1999)

Personal information
- Nickname: Dobermann
- Born: Mark Dave Cereno Apolinario; January 20, 1999 (age 27) Maasim, Sarangani, Philippines
- Height: 5 ft 5 in (165 cm)
- Weight: Flyweight

Boxing career
- Reach: 65 in (165 cm)
- Stance: Southpaw

Boxing record
- Total fights: 24
- Wins: 22
- Win by KO: 14
- Losses: 2

Davemark Cereno Apolinario (born January 20, 1999) is a Filipino professional boxer. He is a former IBO Flyweight champion.

== Professional career ==
Apolinario, managed by Mike Pelayo of Sanman Promotions, made his professional debut on 10 June 2017, defeating fellow Filipino boxer Prince Canonero via first-round technical knockout (TKO).

Following the bout, Apolinario defeated Rio Gulipatan a month after his previous fight, winning via unanimous decision (UD) through four rounds.

A couple of months later, it was reported that Apolinario was scheduled to fight Rudy Salaton on 9 September 2017. Apolinario defeated Salaton via first-round TKO.

Following the bout, Apolinario defeated Rez Padrogane via fifth-round TKO.

A couple of months after his previous fight, Apolinario defeated Frankie Batuon via second-round knock out (KO).

More than a month later, Apolinario defeated Jenuel Lauza, winning a unanimous decision (UD) through eight rounds, all judges scored 80–72 in favor of Apolinario.

More than three months later, Apolinario returned to flyweight and defeated fellow Filipino boxer, Charles Canedo via a round 2 technical knock out (TKO).

=== WBC ABCO Youth flyweight title ===
It was reported that Apolinario was scheduled to fight fellow Filipino boxer, Michael Camelion on 9 September 2018. Apolinario defeated Camelion winning a unanimous decision (UD) through eight rounds. Apolinario won the vacant WBC ABCO Youth flyweight title.

Less than two months after his previous fight, Apolinario defeated fellow Filipino boxer, Joan Imperial via a knock out (KO) in 1:53 of the first round.

More than three months later, Apolinario defeated Filipino compatriot, Romshane Sarguilla winning a unanimous decision (UD) through eight rounds.

On 9 June 2019, Apolinario defeated Filipino compatriot, Adrian Lerasan winning a unanimous decision (UD) through ten rounds.

Four months later, Apolinario defeated Arnold Garde via a first-round TKO.

A couple of months later, Apolinario defeated Richard Rosales via a referee technical decision (RTD) in the fifth round.

On 21 November 2020, after an eleven-month rest due to the COVID-19 pandemic, Apolinario defeated Bonjun Loperez via a referee technical decision (RTD) in the fourth round.

=== WBA Asia Flyweight title ===
On 16 July 2021, less than eight months after his previous fight, Apolinario defeated Charlie Malupangue winning a technical knock out (TKO) in the fourth round. Apolinario won the vacant WBA Asia flyweight title.

On 5 February 2022, Apolinario defeated fellow Filipino boxer Mike Kinaadman via a technical knockout (TKO) in the fifth round.

=== IBO Flyweight title ===
On July 29, 2022, Apolinario won the vacant IBO Flyweight title by defeating Gideon Buthelezi via a knockout (KO) in the first round.

Seven months later, Apolinario was scheduled to face Indonesian boxer Frengky Rohi in a non-title fight. Apolinario defeated Rohi via a referee technical decision (RTD) in the second round.

=== Ohashi Promotions ===
In early June 2023, it was reported that Apolinario signed a deal with Japan-based Ohashi Promotions and will be co-promoting his future matches.

A month later, it was announced that Apolinario will be facing Mexican veteran Brian Mosinos in his Japan debut. The fight is scheduled on the 30th of August 2023. Apolinario defeated Mosinos via a unanimous decision (UD) through eight rounds. During the fight, Apolinario scored a second-round knockdown and later suffered an injury to his left elbow after accidentally hitting Mosinos' head.

Six months later, Apolinario was then scheduled to face two-time SEA Games silver medalist Tanes Ongjunta. Apolinario secured a comeback win against the Thai boxer after being knocked down late in the third round. Apolinario turned things around as he knocked out Ongjunta with an uppercut in the last minute of the fourth round.

==== Apolinario vs Ayala ====
In March 2024, the International Boxing Federation (IBF) announced that Apolinario will be facing Ángel Ayala for the vacant IBF Flyweight title, which was vacated by Jesse Rodriguez, who moved up to Super Flyweight. Both camps were given a month to reach an agreement. Ayala's Zanfer Boxing won the purse bid worth $255,000, outbidding Ohashi Promotions' bid worth $215,000. The fight was scheduled to be held on August 9 in Mexico City.

== Professional boxing record ==
| 24 fights | 22 wins | 2 losses |
|---|---|---|
| By knockout | 14 | 2 |
| By decision | 8 | 0 |

| No. | Result | Record | Opponent | Type | Round, time | Date | Location | Notes |
|---|---|---|---|---|---|---|---|---|
| 24 | Win | 22–2 | Ariston Aton | UD | 6 | 2026-04-26 | Villa Kristen Resort and Hotel, General Santos, Philippines | |
| 23 | Loss | 21–2 | Longyi Hu | KO | 3 (8), 1:45 | 2025-04-22 | Korakuen Hall, Tokyo, Japan | |
| 22 | Win | 21–1 | Jeny Boy Boca | UD | 6 | 2024-12-18 | Bula Gymnasium, General Santos, Philippines | |
| 21 | Loss | 20–1 | Ángel Ayala | KO | 6 (12), 2:06 | 2024-08-09 | Restaurante Arroyo, Mexico City, Mexico | For vacant IBF flyweight title |
| 20 | Win | 20–0 | Tanes Ongjunta | KO | 4 (8), 1:44 | 2024-02-22 | Korakuen Hall, Tokyo, Japan | |
| 19 | Win | 19–0 | Brian Mosinos | UD | 8 | 2023-08-30 | Korakuen Hall, Tokyo, Japan | |
| 18 | Win | 18–0 | Frengky Rohi | RTD | 2 (10), 3:00 | 2023-02-11 | Sanman Gym, General Santos, Philippines | |
| 17 | Win | 17–0 | Gideon Buthelezi | KO | 1 (12), 2:59 | 2022-07-29 | International Convention Centre, East London, South Africa | Won vacant IBO flyweight title |
| 16 | Win | 16–0 | Mike Kinaadman | RTD | 4 (10), 3:00 | 2022-02-05 | Sanman Gym, General Santos, Philippines | |
| 15 | Win | 15–0 | Charlie Malupangue | TKO | 4 (10), 1:31 | 2021-07-16 | Tabunok Sports Complex, Talisay, Philippines | Won vacant WBA Asia South flyweight title |
| 14 | Win | 14–0 | Bonjun Loperez | RTD | 4 (8), 3:00 | 2020-11-21 | Sanman Gym, General Santos, Philippines | |
| 13 | Win | 13–0 | Richard Rosales | RTD | 5 (8), 3:00 | 2019-12-14 | Elorde Sports Complex Grand Ballroom, Parañaque, Philippines | |
| 12 | Win | 12–0 | Arnold Garde | TKO | 1 (8), 1:14 | 2019-10-20 | Robinsons' Mall Atrium, General Santos, Philippines | |
| 11 | Win | 11–0 | Adrian Lerasan | UD | 10 | 2019-06-09 | TV5 Studio, Quezon City, Philippines | |
| 10 | Win | 10–0 | Romshane Sarguilla | UD | 8 | 2019-02-09 | Midas Hotel and Casino, Pasay, Philippines | |
| 9 | Win | 9–0 | Joan Imperial | KO | 1 (6), 1:07 | 2018-10-29 | Midas Hotel and Casino, Pasay, Philippines | |
| 8 | Win | 8–0 | Michael Camelion | UD | 8 | 2018-09-09 | Polomolok Gym, Polomolok, Philippines | Won vacant WBC-ABCO Youth flyweight title |
| 7 | Win | 7–0 | Charles Canedo | TKO | 2 (8), | 2018-06-27 | Capitol Gym, Digos, Philippines | |
| 6 | Win | 6–0 | Jenuel Lauza | UD | 8 | 2018-03-10 | Mandaluyong City Hall Grounds, Mandaluyong, Philippines | |
| 5 | Win | 5–0 | Frankie Batuon | KO | 2 (6), 2:59 | 2018-01-10 | Gaisano Mall Atrium, General Santos, Philippines | |
| 4 | Win | 4–0 | Rez Padrogane | TKO | 5 (6), 2:40 | 2017-11-05 | Robinsons' Mall Atrium, General Santos, Philippines | |
| 3 | Win | 3–0 | Rudy Salaton | TKO | 1 (4), 2:27 | 2017-09-09 | Polomolok Gym, Polomolok, Philippines | |
| 2 | Win | 2–0 | Rio Gulipatan | UD | 4 | 2017-07-23 | Robinsons' Mall Atrium, General Santos, Philippines | |
| 1 | Win | 1–0 | Prince Canonero | TKO | 1 (4), 2:59 | 2017-06-10 | Robinsons' Mall Atrium, General Santos, Philippines | |

== Awards and recognition ==
- 2023 Gabriel "Flash" Elorde Memorial Boxing Awards "Boxer of the Year"

== See also ==
- List of southpaw stance boxers
- History of boxing in the Philippines

Sporting positions
Regional boxing titles
| Vacant Title last held by Ronie Tanallon | ABCO Youth flyweight champion September 9, 2018 – 2018; Vacated | Vacant Title next held by Clyde Azarcon |
| Preceded by Jerry Tomogdan | WBA Asia South flyweight champion July 16, 2021 – 2021; Vacated | Vacant Title next held by Joel Lino |
Minor world boxing titles
| Vacant Title last held by Maximino Flores | IBO flyweight champion July 29, 2022 – 2023; Vacated | Vacant Title next held by Jackson Chauke |
