= Tommy Karpency =

American boxer (born 1986)

Personal information
- Nickname: Kryptonite
- Born: Thomas Karpency; January 10, 1986 (age 40) Adah, Pennsylvania, U.S.
- Height: 6 ft 1/2 in (184 cm)
- Weight: Cruiserweight; Light Heavyweight

Boxing career
- Reach: 73 in (185 cm)
- Stance: Southpaw

Boxing record
- Total fights: 40
- Wins: 30
- Win by KO: 19
- Losses: 9
- Draws: 1

Thomas Karpency (born January 10, 1986) is an American professional boxer who fights in the light heavyweight division. A professional since 2006, he is a three-time world title challenger; first challenging for the WBO and IBO light heavyweight titles in 2012, as well as the WBC light heavyweight title in 2015. He holds a notable upset win over former IBF and WBC title holder Chad Dawson.

== Background ==
Karpency is from a "patch town" inside of Adah, Pennsylvania called "Palmer". Karpency was trained by his father, Tom Karpency Sr. There are four Palmer natives who are current professional boxers. Palmer has an approximate population of 200 people. Per capita, Palmer has one of the highest percentages of professional athletes in the United States. Karpency attended Albert Gallatin High School. During his last two years at Albert Gallatin, Karpency competed in wrestling, and was also an outstanding football player.

== Boxing career ==
=== Early career ===
Karpency debuted in professional boxing at the age of 20 as a cruiserweight, after winning a Toughman contest. He has spent the majority of his career boxing on the American circuit managing to win the regional WBA Fedecentro title in 2009.

With a record of 19–1–1, Karpency made his overseas debut against Karo Murat in Germany for the WBO Inter-Continental Light Heavyweight title on May 1, 2010. Karpency was defeated via unanimous decision.

=== First world title shot ===
Two years later in February 2012, Karpency again went overseas to Cardiff, Wales, challenging Nathan Cleverly for the WBO light heavyweight title. Karpency was again defeated via unanimous decision.

Despite being handed his first world title challenge and loss, Karpency next fought Andrzej Fonfara for the IBO light heavyweight title nine months later. Karpency was defeated via TKO.

Following a two-year layoff from his consecutive world title defeats, Karpency returned to professional boxing in 2014 picking up two unanimous decision wins before facing former world title holder Chad Dawson on October 4, 2014. In a significant upset, Karpency won via split decision, picking up the biggest win of his career to date, and moved to 24–4–1.

=== Third world title shot ===
After winning the Pennsylvania light heavyweight title in his next fight, Karpency received another world title shot, this time for Adonis Stevenson's WBC title on September 11, 2015. Karpency was defeated via TKO.

A year later in 2016, Karpency made his return, getting a knockout win on the regional circuit before facing Oleksander Gvozdyk for the NABF light heavyweight title. Karpency was defeated by the current WBC light heavyweight champion via TKO. Karpency has since gone 3-0 (all TKO wins), fighting most recently as November 2018.

=== Later career ===
In 2024, Karpency was a late replacement for a fight with David Nyika, an Olympic bronze medallist who had a 9-0 pro record at the time, and nearly a decade younger. The fight took place in Nyika's native New Zealand. Karpency lost by TKO in three rounds.

== Personal life ==
Aside from boxing, Karpency is also a registered nurse. Karpency has two younger brothers who are also professional boxers; Jeremiah and Dan. "The Bullfrog" Jeremiah, age 28, fights in the heavyweight division (holding a record of 15–2–1) while Dan competes as a super welterweight and is 8–2.

== Professional boxing record ==
37 fights	29 wins	7 losses
By knockout	18	4
By decision	11	3
Draws	1	

No.	Result	Record	Opponent	Type	Round, time	Date	Location	Notes
41	Loss	30–9–1	David Nyika	TKO	3 (10), 1:13	Sep 15, 2024	Viaduct Events Centre, Auckland, New Zealand	For IBF Inter-Continental and vacant WBO Asia Pacific cruiserweight titles
40	Win	31-8-1	Joe Jones	UD	3	Aug 10, 2024	Packard Music Hall in Warren, Ohio	
39	Loss	30–8–1	Yunieski Gonzalez	KO	2 (10), 2:03	Sep 14, 2021	Seminole Hard Rock Hotel and Casino, Hollywood, California, US	
38	Win	30–7–1	Mickey Scarborough	KO	1 (10), 0:52	Mar 13, 2021	Southpaw Boxing and Fitness, Windham, New Hampshire, US	
37	Loss	29–7–1	Gilberto Ramírez	RTD	4 (10), 3:00	Apr 12, 2019	Staples Center, Los Angeles, California, US	
36	Win	29–6–1	Marlon Hayes	TKO	3 (8), 0:18	Nov 21, 2018	Castleton Banquet & Conference Center, Windham, New Hampshire, US	
35	Win	28–6–1	Rubin Williams	TKO	1 (10), 1:00	Nov 11, 2017	Cumberland County Civic Center, Portland, Maine, US	
34	Win	27–6–1	Mickey Scarborough	TKO	1 (8), 2:11	Nov 18, 2016	Waterfront Place Hotel, Morgantown, West Virginia, US	
33	Loss	26–6–1	Oleksandr Gvozdyk	TKO	6 (10), 2:21	Jul 23, 2016	MGM Grand Garden Arena, Las Vegas, Nevada, US	For NABF light-heavyweight title
32	Win	26–5–1	Paul Gonsalves	KO	1 (8), 1:39	Apr 9, 2016	The Meadows Racetrack and Casino, Washington, Pennsylvania, US	Retained NABA-US light-heavyweight title
31	Loss	25–5–1	Adonis Stevenson	TKO	3 (12), 0:21	Sep 11, 2015	Ricoh Coliseum, Toronto, Ontario, Canada	For WBC and The Ring light-heavyweight titles
30	Win	25–4–1	Rayco Saunders	UD	8	May 16, 2015	The Meadows Racetrack and Casino, Washington, Pennsylvania, US	Retained US Pennsylvania State light-heavyweight title
29	Win	24–4–1	Chad Dawson	SD	10	Oct 4, 2014	Foxwoods Resort Casino, Ledyard, Connecticut, US	
28	Win	23–4–1	Dhafir Smith	UD	10	Jul 26, 2014	The Meadows Racetrack and Casino, Washington, Pennsylvania, US	For vacant NABA-US and US Pennsylvania State light-heavyweight titles.
27	Win	22–4–1	Rayco Saunders	UD	6	Jan 31, 2014	Waterfront Place Hotel, Morgantown, West Virginia, US	
26	Loss	21–4–1	Andrzej Fonfara	TKO	7 (12), 0:57	Nov 16, 2012	UIC Pavilion, Chicago, Illinois, US	For vacant IBO light-heavyweight title
25	Loss	21–3–1	Nathan Cleverly	UD	12	Feb 25, 2012	Motorpoint Arena, Cardiff, Wales	For WBO light-heavyweight title
24	Win	21–2–1	Andre Hemphill	KO	1 (6), 2:12	Feb 12, 2012	Zembo Shrine Building, Harrisburg, Pennsylvania, US	
23	Win	20–2–1	Julius Jackson	RTD	2 (10)	Jun 19, 2010	Wheeling Island Casino Racetrack, Wheeling, West Virginia, US	
22	Loss	19–2–1	Karo Murat	UD	12	May 1, 2010	Weser-Ems Halle, Oldenburg, Germany	For WBO Inter-Continental light-heavyweight title
21	Win	19–1–1	Mike McFail	TKO	3 (6), 2:48	Nov 25, 2009	Morgantown, West Virginia, US	
20	Win	18–1–1	Chuck Mussachio	UD	10	Aug 21, 2009	Waterfront Place Hotel, Morgantown, West Virginia, US	Retained WBA Fedecentro light-heavyweight title
19	Win	17–1–1	Eric Howard	UD	6	May 2, 2009	Waterfront Place Hotel, Morgantown, West Virginia, US	
18	Win	16–1–1	Cory Phelps	TKO	2 (10), 2:27	Jan 30, 2009	Waterfront Place Hotel, Morgantown, West Virginia, US	Won vacant WBA Fedecentro light-heavyweight title
17	Win	15–1–1	Willis Lockett	UD	6	Nov 28, 2008	Caravan Club, New Castle, Pennsylvania, US	
16	Win	14–1–1	Lee Fortune	KO	1 (8)	Nov 15, 2008	Waterfront Place Hotel, Morgantown, West Virginia, US	
15	Win	13–1–1	Eric Asher	TKO	5 (6), 2:01	Sep 25, 2008	Mountaineer Casino Racetrack and Resort, Chester, West Virginia, US	
14	Win	12–1–1	Etianne Whitaker	TKO	1 (4), 1:27	Aug 22, 2008	Waterfront Place Hotel, Morgantown, West Virginia, US	
13	Loss	11–1–1	Rayco Saunders	UD	8	Jul 2, 2008	Pullman Park, Butler, Pennsylvania, US	
12	Draw	11–0–1	Demetrius Davis	MD	8	Jun 13, 2008	Du Burns Arena, Baltimore, Maryland, US	
11	Win	11–0	Etianne Whitaker	KO	3 (8), 2:19	Apr 26, 2008	Waterfront Place Hotel, Morgantown, West Virginia, US	
10	Win	10–0	Derrick Holsinger	TKO	1 (6), 2:36	Feb 1, 2008	Waterfront Place Hotel, Morgantown, West Virginia, US	
9	Win	9–0	Cullen Rogers	TKO	2 (6)	Nov 21, 2007	Avalon Hotel, Erie, Pennsylvania, US	
8	Win	8–0	James North	TKO	1 (4)	Sep 22, 2007	IceoPlex at Southpointe, Pittsburgh, Pennsylvania, US	
7	Win	7–0	Eric Asher	TKO	2 (4), 1:20	Aug 23, 2007	Mountaineer Casino Racetrack and Resort, Chester, West Virginia, US	
6	Win	6–0	Cullen Rogers	UD	6	Jul 20, 2007	Waterfront Place Hotel, Morgantown, West Virginia, US	
5	Win	5–0	Alan Snyder	TKO	1 (4), 0:55	Apr 20, 2007	Waterfront Place Hotel, Morgantown, West Virginia, US	
4	Win	4–0	Larry Brothers	UD	4	Jan 26, 2007	Waterfront Place Hotel, Morgantown, West Virginia, US	
3	Win	3–0	Bob Wilder	TKO	3 (4), 2:05	Nov 22, 2006	Avalon Hotel, Erie, Pennsylvania, US	
2	Win	2–0	Derrick Holsinger	UD	4	Oct 7, 2006	Wheeling Island Casino Racetrack, Wheeling, West Virginia, US	
1	Win	1–0	Santiago Hillario	UD	4	May 19, 2006	Wheeling Island Casino Racetrack, Wheeling, West Virginia, US	Professional debut.
