= Robin Krasniqi =

Kosovan-born German boxer (born 1987)

Personal information
- Nationality: German
- Born: Haxhi Krasniqi; 1 April 1987 (age 39) Junik, SAP Kosovo, SFR Yugoslavia
- Height: 1.86 m (6 ft 1 in)
- Weight: Super-middleweight; Light-heavyweight

Boxing career
- Reach: 188 cm (74 in)
- Stance: Orthodox

Boxing record
- Total fights: 60
- Wins: 53
- Win by KO: 20
- Losses: 7

Haxhi Krasniqi (born 1 April 1987), known as Robin Krasniqi, is a Kosovan-born German professional boxer. He is the first person born in Kosovo to be a professional world boxing champion having held the IBO and interim WBA light-heavyweight titles from 2020 to 2021. Krasniqi also held the European super-middleweight title from 2018 to 2019.

== Background ==
Krasniqi was born in Junik, Kosovo, but moved with his family to Munich, Germany, at a young age during the Kosovo War.

== Professional career ==
Krasniqi made his professional debut on 20 October 2005, losing to Sven Haselhuhn in a four-round points decision. In his third fight, on 5 January 2006, he lost another four-round decision to Adrian Cerneaga. Krasniqi would spend the next seven years undefeated, winning two regional WBO light-heavyweight titles.

On 20 April 2013, he made his first attempt at a world title, losing by unanimous decision to WBO light-heavyweight champion Nathan Cleverly.

A second opportunity at a world title came on 21 March 2015, this time against WBA light-heavyweight champion Jürgen Brähmer, who stopped Krasniqi in nine rounds.

Krasniqi won the vacant European super-middleweight title on 2 June 2018, defeating Stanyslav Kashtanov at Weaarena in Bad Tölz by unanimous decision.

He retained the title with a unanimous decision win over Ronny Landaeta at Anhalt Arena in Dessau-Roßlau on 17 November 2018, before losing the championship to Stefan Härtel by unanimous decision at Stadthalle in Magdeburg on 11 May 2019.

On 10 October 2020, at GETEC Arena in Magdeburg, Krasniqi became the first boxer born in Kosovo to be a professional world champion when he won the WBA interim and IBO light-heavyweight titles by scoring a third-round knockout against Dominic Boesel.

Almost exactly a year later, on 9 October 2021, he lost the IBO title in a rematch with Boesel at the same venue, going down to a split decision defeat.

== Professional boxing record ==
61 fights	54 wins	7 losses
By knockout	20	1
By decision	33	6
By disqualification	1	0

No.	Result	Record	Opponent	Type	Round, time	Date	Location	Notes
61	Win	54–7	Jorge Silva	UD	10	4 May 2024	Neue Sporthalle, Augsburg, Bavaria, Germany	
60	Win	53–7	Nadjib Mohammedi	DQ	9 (10), ?	5 Aug 2023	Fadil Vokrri Stadium, Pristina, Kosovo	
59	Win	52–7	Timur Nikarkhoev	RTD	5 (10), 3:00	25 Feb 2023	Audi Dome, Munich, Bavaria, Germany	
58	Loss	51–7	Dominic Boesel	SD	12	9 Oct 2021	GETEC Arena, Magdeburg, Germany	Lost IBO light-heavyweight title
57	Win	51–6	Dominic Boesel	KO	3 (12), 2:25	10 Oct 2020	GETEC Arena, Magdeburg, Germany	Won WBA interim and IBO light-heavyweight titles
56	Win	50–6	Stanislav Eschner	TKO	6 (6), 2:46	22 Aug 2020	Seebühne Elbauenpark, Magdeburg, Germany	
55	Loss	49–6	Stefan Härtel	UD	12	11 May 2019	Stadthalle, Magdeburg, Germany	Lost European super-middleweight title
54	Win	49–5	Ronny Landaeta	UD	12	17 Nov 2018	Anhalt Arena, Dessau-Roßlau, Germany	Retained European super-middleweight title
53	Win	48–5	Stanyslav Kashtanov	UD	12	2 Jun 2018	weeArena, Bad Tölz, Germany	Won vacant European super-middleweight title
52	Win	47–5	Bartlomiej Grafka	UD	8	3 Feb 2018	Erdgas Sportarena, Halle, Germany	
51	Loss	46–5	Arthur Abraham	UD	12	22 Apr 2017	Messe, Erfurt, Germany	
50	Win	46–4	Jürgen Doberstein	MD	12	15 Jul 2016	Saarlandhalle, Saarbrücken, Germany	Won WBA Inter-Continental and vacant WBO Inter-Continental super-middleweight titles
49	Win	45–4	Cagri Ermis	UD	8	9 Jan 2016	Maritim Hotel, Berlin, Germany	
48	Win	44–4	Vaclav Polak	RTD	1 (8), 3:00	17 Oct 2015	Hospůdka Eden, Ústí nad Labem, Czech Republic	
47	Loss	43–4	Jürgen Brähmer	RTD	9 (12), 3:00	21 Mar 2015	Rostock, Germany	For WBA light-heavyweight title
46	Win	43–3	Dariusz Sęk	UD	12	20 Dec 2014	Ballhausforum, Munich, Bavaria, Germany	Retained WBO International and WBA Continental (Europe) light-heavyweight titles
45	Win	42–3	Oleksandr Cherviak	UD	12	26 Jul 2014	Anhalt Arena, Dessau-Roßlau, Germany	Retained WBO International light-heavyweight title; Won vacant WBA Continental (Europe) light-heavyweight title
44	Win	41–3	Emmanuel Danso	KO	7 (10), 1:55	28 Mar 2014	MBS Arena, Potsdam, Germany	Won vacant WBO International light-heavyweight title
43	Win	40–3	Tomas Adamek	UD	8	13 Jul 2013	EnergieVerbund Arena, Dresden, Germany	
42	Loss	39–3	Nathan Cleverly	UD	12	20 Apr 2013	Wembley Arena, London, England	For WBO light-heavyweight title
41	Win	39–2	Max Heyman	TKO	3 (12), 2:45	16 Nov 2012	Maritim Hotel, Magdeburg, Germany	Retained WBO International light-heavyweight title
40	Win	38–2	Serdar Sahin	KO	4 (12), 0:46	25 Aug 2012	O2 World, Berlin, Germany	Won vacant WBO International light-heavyweight title
39	Win	37–2	Hakim Zoulikha	TKO	12 (12), 2:55	7 Jan 2012	Maritim Hotel, Magdeburg, Germany	Retained WBO European light-heavyweight title
38	Win	36–2	Abdelkahim Derghal	TKO	4 (12), 1:45	21 Oct 2011	Brandenburg-Halle, Frankfurt, Germany	Won vacant WBO European light-heavyweight title
37	Win	35–2	Ben Nsafoah	UD	8	9 Apr 2011	Bördelandhalle, Magdeburg, Germany	
36	Win	34–2	Jindrich Velecky	PTS	6	3 Dec 2010	Generali Arena, Prague, Czech Republic	
35	Win	33–2	Kanstantsin Makhankou	UD	8	23 Oct 2010	Erdgas Arena, Riesa, Germany	
34	Win	32–2	Tani Dima	PTS	10	6 Jun 2010	Dachau, Germany	
33	Win	31–2	Alexander Sipos	TKO	6 (8), 2:55	23 Jan 2010	Theaterfabrik, Munich, Bavaria, Germany	
32	Win	30–2	Xhavid Shabani	KO	1 (6), 2:04	6 Sep 2009	Festhalle Alpenland, Maisach, Germany	
31	Win	29–2	Steve Kroekel	TKO	4 (6)	6 Jun 2009	Sporthalle Brandberge, Halle, Germany	
30	Win	28–2	Ronny Daunke	TKO	4 (6)	24 May 2009	Festzelt, Grafing, Germany	
29	Win	27–2	Ali Kiroglu	TKO	4 (6), 1:40	21 May 2009	Festzelt Trudering, Munich, Bavaria, Germany	
28	Win	26–2	Lars Buchholz	UD	6	13 Dec 2008	SAP Arena, Mannheim, Germany	
27	Win	25–2	Sven Haselhuhn	UD	6	11 Oct 2008	O2 World, Berlin, Germany	
26	Win	24–2	Adrian Cerneaga	TKO	2 (6), 2:59	26 Jul 2008	Boxfabrik, Munich, Bavaria, Germany	
25	Win	23–2	Steve Kroekel	PTS	6	12 Jul 2008	Color Line Arena, Hamburg, Germany	
24	Win	22–2	Josef Balaz	TKO	2 (4), 2:55	22 May 2008	Munich, Bavaria, Germany	
23	Win	21–2	Ralf Riemer	UD	4	4 May 2008	Grafing, Germany	
22	Win	20–2	Jonathan Pasi	UD	4	21 Dec 2007	Alabama-Halle, Munich, Bavaria, Germany	
21	Win	19–2	Ibrahim Uzunkaya	PTS	6	19 Oct 2007	Alabama-Halle, Munich, Bavaria, Germany	
20	Win	18–2	Ilhan Oezem	TKO	2 (4)	28 Jul 2007	Munich, Bavaria, Germany	
19	Win	17–2	Berry Butler	UD	6	7 Jul 2007	Kölnarena, Cologne, Germany	
18	Win	16–2	Miroslav Cacha	PTS	4	16 Jun 2007	Boxhalle BC 02, Augsburg, Bavaria, Germany	
17	Win	15–2	Patrick Berger	PTS	4	20 May 2007	Festzelt, Munich, Bavaria, Germany	
16	Win	14–2	Robert Igrec	PTS	4	17 May 2007	Festzelt, Munich, Bavaria, Germany	
15	Win	13–2	Engin Erdogan	MD	6	31 Mar 2007	Olympiahalle, Munich, Bavaria, Germany	
14	Win	12–2	Omar Jatta	UD	4	10 Mar 2007	SAP Arena, Mannheim, Germany	
13	Win	11–2	Ralf Sawetzki	TD	4	9 Feb 2007	Alabama-Halle, Munich, Bavaria, Germany	
12	Win	10–2	Petr Jasukievic	TKO	3 (4)	12 Dec 2006	Boxhalle BC 02, Augsburg, Bavaria, Germany	
11	Win	9–2	Ommid Mostaghim	PTS	6	9 Dec 2006	OT Josefshaus, Aachen, Germany	
10	Win	8–2	Constantin Trifanov	TKO	3 (6)	23 Sep 2006	Saaltheater Geulen, Aachen, Germany	
9	Win	7–2	Adrian Cerneaga	PTS	4	3 Sep 2006	Festzelt Stiftl, Beilngries, Germany	
8	Win	6–2	Riccardo Grassmann	PTS	4	22 Jul 2006	Iphitos Arena, Munich, Bavaria, Germany	
7	Win	5–2	Deniz Emren	PTS	4	25 May 2006	Festzelt Trudering, Munich, Bavaria, Germany	
6	Win	4–2	Patrick Linkert	PTS	4	22 Apr 2006	Boxhalle BC 02, Augsburg, Bavaria, Germany	
5	Win	3–2	Volkan Sarier	PTS	4	19 Mar 2006	Festzelt Geisenfeld, Ingolstadt, Germany	
4	Win	2–2	Mehmet Altintas	PTS	4	9 Mar 2006	Alabama-Halle, Munich, Bavaria, Germany	
3	Loss	1–2	Adrian Cerneaga	PTS	4	5 Jan 2006	Alabama-Halle, Munich, Bavaria, Germany	
2	Win	1–1	Ladislav Martinek	TKO	2 (4)	26 Nov 2005	Boxfabrik, Munich, Bavaria, Germany	
1	Loss	0–1	Sven Haselhuhn	PTS	4	20 Oct 2005	Alabama-Halle, Munich, Bavaria, Germany	

Sporting positions
Regional boxing titles
Vacant Title last held by Tamas Kovacs	WBO European light-heavyweight champion 21 October 2011 – 25 August 2012; Won International title	Vacant Title next held by Denis Simcic
New title	WBO International light-heavyweight champion 25 August 2012 – February 2013; Vacated	Vacant Title next held by Eduard Gutknecht
Vacant Title last held by Jürgen Brähmer	WBO International light-heavyweight champion 28 March 2014 – March 2015; Vacated	Vacant Title next held by Artur Beterbiev
Vacant Title last held by Nadjib Mohammedi	WBA Continental (Europe) light-heavyweight champion 26 July 2014 – 21 March 2015; Lost bid for world title	Vacant Title next held by Dominic Boesel
Vacant Title last held by Hadillah Mohoumadi	European super-middleweight champion 2 June 2018 – 11 May 2019	Succeeded by Stefan Härtel
Minor world boxing titles
Preceded by Dominic Boesel	IBO light-heavyweight champion 10 October 2020 – 9 October 2021	Succeeded by Dominic Boesel
Major world boxing titles
Preceded by Dominic Boesel	WBA light-heavyweight champion Interim title 10 October 2020 – 25 August 2021; Stripped	Title discontinued
