= List of IBO world champions =

This is a list of IBO world champions, showing every world champion certificated by the International Boxing Organization (IBO) since 1993.

- ^{r} – Champion relinquished title
- ^{s} – Champion stripped of title

== Heavyweight ==
No.	Name	Duration of reign	Defenses
1	(United States) Pinklon Thomas	Nov 14, 1992 – Jan 29, 1993^{s}	0
2	(United States) Lionel Butler	Feb 23, 1993 – Mar 1993^{s}	0
3	(United States) Danell Nicholson	Aug 4, 1994 – Oct 1994^{r}	0
4	(New Zealand) Jimmy Thunder	Oct 29, 1994 – Jul 16, 1995^{s}	2
5	(Denmark) Brian Nielsen	Jan 12, 1996 – Jun 18, 1999^{s}	5
6	(United Kingdom) Lennox Lewis	Nov 13, 1999 – Apr 22, 2001	3
7	(United States) Hasim Rahman	Apr 22, 2001 – Nov 17, 2001	0
8	(United Kingdom) Lennox Lewis (2)	Nov 17, 2001 – Feb 6, 2004^{r}	2
9	(Ukraine) Wladimir Klitschko	Apr 22, 2006 – Nov 28, 2015	18
10	(United Kingdom) Tyson Fury	Nov 28, 2015 – Oct 12, 2016^{r}	0
11	(United Kingdom) Anthony Joshua	Apr 29, 2017 – Jun 1, 2019	3
12	(United States) Andy Ruiz Jr.	Jun 1, 2019 – Dec 7, 2019	0
13	(United Kingdom) Anthony Joshua (2)	Dec 7, 2019 – Sep 25, 2021	1
14	(Ukraine) Oleksandr Usyk	Sep 25, 2021 – Jun 26, 2026^{r}	5

== Cruiserweight ==
No.	Name	Duration of reign	Defenses
1	(Nigeria) David Izeqwire	Dec 28, 1993 – Nov 5, 1994	1
2	(United States) Adolpho Washington	Nov 5, 1994 – Mar 17, 1995^{s}	0
3	(Ghana) Ted Cofie	Nov 3, 1995 – 1997^{r}	0
4	(United States) Booker T. Word	Apr 18, 1997 – 1997^{r}	0
5	(United States) James Toney	Jun 14, 1997 – 1998^{r}	0
6	(United States) Robert Daniels	May 5, 1998 – 1999^{r}	0
7	(United States) Thomas Hearns	Apr 10, 1999 – Apr 8, 2000	0
8	(Jamaica) Uriah Grant	Apr 8, 2000 – Feb 3, 2001	0
9	(United Kingdom) Carl Thompson	Feb 3, 2001 – Nov 26, 2001	0
10	(United States) Ezra Sellers	Nov 26, 2001 – Apr 6, 2002^{s}	0
11	(South Africa) Sebastiaan Rothmann	Oct 26, 2002 – Feb 6, 2004	1
12	(United Kingdom) Carl Thompson (2)	Feb 6, 2004 – Feb 2006^{s}	1
13	(Poland) Tomasz Adamek	Jun 9, 2007 – 2008^{r}	0
14	(United States) Johnathon Banks	Jul 12, 2008 – Feb 27, 2009^{s}	0
15	(Australia) Danny Green	Aug 15, 2009 – Jul 20, 2011	4
16	(United States) Antonio Tarver	Jul 20, 2011 – Jul 2012^{s}	1
17	(Australia) Danny Green (2)	Nov 21, 2012 – 2013^{r}	0
18	(United Kingdom) Ola Afolabi	Nov 2, 2013 – 2015^{r}	0
19	(Russia) Rakhim Chakhkiev	May 22, 2015 – Nov 4, 2015	0
20	(United Kingdom) Ola Afolabi (2)	Nov 4, 2015 – Feb 27, 2016	0
21	(Germany) Marco Huck	Feb 27, 2016 – Apr 1, 2017^{s}	1
22	(South Africa) Kevin Lerena	Sep 9, 2017 – Nov 1, 2021^{s}	6
23	(United Kingdom) Jack Massey	Nov 27, 2021 – November 1, 2022^{s}	1
24	(Belgium) Yves Ngabu	Sep 09, 2023 – October 1, 2025^{s}	1
25	(Albania) Juergen Uldedaj	Oct 25, 2025 – present	1

== Light heavyweight ==
No.	Name	Duration of reign	Defenses
1	(United States) Lenny LaPaglia	Aug 20, 1993 – 1993^{r}	0
2	(Malawi) Drake Thadzi	May 14, 1997 – Dec 12, 1998^{r}	1
3	(United States) Roy Jones Jr.	Nov 18, 1999 – May 15, 2004	5
4	(United States) Antonio Tarver	May 15, 2004 – Dec 18, 2004	0
5	(Jamaica) Glen Johnson	Dec 18, 2004 – Jun 18, 2005	0
6	(United States) Antonio Tarver (2)	Jun 18, 2005 – Jun 10, 2006	1
7	(United States) Bernard Hopkins	Jun 10, 2006 – 2007^{r}	0
8	(United States) Antonio Tarver (3)	Jun 9, 2007 – Oct 11, 2008	2
9	(United States) Chad Dawson	Oct 11, 2008 – Aug 14, 2010	2
10	(Canada) Jean Pascal	Aug 14, 2010 – May 21, 2011	1
11	(Poland) Andrzej Fonfara	Nov 16, 2012 – 2013^{s}	0
12	(Australia) Blake Caparello	Oct 17, 2013 – 2014^{s}	0
13	(South Africa) Thomas Oosthuizen	Mar 14, 2015 – Jun 5, 2015^{s}	0
14	(Russia) Umar Salamov	May 21, 2016 – May 17, 2017^{r}	0
15	(Russia) Igor Mikhalkin	May 19, 2017 – Mar 14, 2018^{r}	1
16	(Germany) Karo Murat	Mar 24, 2018 – Dec 15, 2018	0
17	(Sweden) Sven Fornling	Dec 15, 2018 – Nov 16, 2019	0
18	(Germany) Dominic Boesel	Nov 16, 2019 – Oct 10, 2020	0
19	(Germany) Robin Krasniqi	Oct 10, 2020 – Oct 09, 2021	0
20	(Germany) Dominic Boesel (2)	Oct 09, 2021 – May 14, 2022^{s}	0
21	(Republic of Ireland) Padraig McCrory	Oct 22, 2022 – -	0
22	(United Kingdom) Lyndon Arthur	Sep 01, 2023 – Dec 23, 2023	0
23	(Russia) Dmitry Bivol	Dec 23, 2023 – Oct 12, 2024	1
24	(Russia) Artur Beterbiev	Oct 12, 2024 – Feb 22, 2025	0
25	(Russia) Dmitry Bivol (2)	Feb 22, 2025 – present	0

== Super middleweight ==
No.	Name	Duration of reign	Defenses
1	(United States) Willie Ball	Jul 17, 1992 – Oct 9, 1992	0
2	(Canada) Todd Nadon	Oct 9, 1992 – 1993^{r}	0
3	(United States) Vinny Pazienza	Dec 28, 1993 – 1994^{r}	0
4	(Australia) Rick Thornberry	Apr 21, 1995 – 1996^{s}	0
5	(United States) Karl Willis	Oct 13, 1996 – 1996^{s}	0
6	(United States) Eddie White	Nov 27, 1996 – 1997^{s}	0
7	(Denmark) Mads Larsen	May 2, 1997 – 1999^{r}	4
8	(United States) Dana Rosenblatt	Nov 5, 1999 – 2000^{r}	0
9	(United Kingdom) Adrian Dodson	Mar 3, 2001 – Apr 7, 2001	0
10	(Argentina) Ramon Arturo Brítez	Apr 7, 2001 – Dec 10, 2001	0
11	(United Kingdom) Brian Magee	Dec 10, 2001 – Jun 26, 2004	7
12	(United Kingdom) Robin Reid	Jun 26, 2004 – Aug 6, 2005	0
13	(United States) Jeff Lacy	Aug 6, 2005 – Mar 4, 2006^{s}	1
14	(Colombia) Fulgencio Zúñiga	Sep 1, 2007 – 2008^{r}	0
15	(Australia) Sakio Bika	Nov 13, 2008 – 2010^{s}	0
16	(Malawi) Isaac Chilemba	Jun 19, 2010 – 2011^{s}	1
17	(South Africa) Thomas Oosthuizen	Mar 26, 2011 – 2014^{s}	7
18	(United States) Donovan George	Aug 23, 2014 – 2014^{s}	0
19	(Australia) Zac Dunn	Jun 27, 2015 – 2016^{s}	0
20	(Australia) Renold Quinlan	Oct 14, 2016 – Feb 4, 2017	0
21	(United Kingdom) Chris Eubank Jr.	Feb 4, 2017 – Feb 17, 2018^{s}	2
22	(United Kingdom) Chris Eubank Jr.(2)	Feb 23, 2019 – Dec 17, 2019^{r}	0
23	(Ecuador) Carlos Góngora	Dec 18, 2020 – Dec 18, 2021^{r}	1
24	(United Kingdom) Lerrone Richards	Dec 18, 2021 – 2022^{s}	0
25	(Cuba) Osleys Iglesias	Dec 9, 2022 – Present	6

== Middleweight ==
No.	Name	Duration of reign	Defenses
1	(United States) Glenwood Brown	Aug 25, 1995 – 1997^{r}	0
2	(The Bahamas) Freeman Barr	Sep 20, 1997 – 1998^{r}	1
3	(South Africa) Mpush Makambi	Sep 8, 1998 – Sep 30, 2000	3
4	(Netherlands) Raymond Joval	Sep 30, 2000 – 2004^{s}	4
5	(Netherlands) Raymond Joval (2)	Jun 3, 2005 – 2006^{r}	1
6	(Australia) Daniel Geale	Dec 14, 2007 – May 27, 2009	1
7	(Australia) Anthony Mundine	May 27, 2009 – 2009^{r}	0
8	(United States) Peter Manfredo Jr.	May 22, 2010 – 2011^{s}	0
9	(Georgia (country)) Avtandil Khurtsidze	Mar 13, 2011 – 2011^{s}	1
10	(Kazakhstan) Gennady Golovkin	Dec 9, 2011 – Sep 15, 2018^{s}	17
11	(Kazakhstan) Gennady Golovkin (2)	Oct 5, 2019 – Jun 14, 2023^{r}	2
12	(United Kingdom) Chris Eubank Jr.	Oct, 12 2024 – present	0

== Super welterweight ==
No.	Name	Duration of reign	Defenses
1	(United States) Lonnie Beasley	Apr 10, 1993 – 1994^{r}	0
2	(Australia) Lester Ellis	Jul 17, 1995 – 1995^{s}	0
3	(United States) Patrick Goossen	Jun 26, 1996 – 1996^{r}	0
4	(Canada) Manny Sobral	Dec 12, 1996 – 1997^{r}	1
5	(United Kingdom) Adrian Stone	Apr 15, 2000 – 2001^{r}	3
6	(United Kingdom) Richard Williams	Dec 1, 2002 – Jun 21, 2003	3
7	(Argentina) Sergio Martínez	Jun 21, 2003 – 2004^{r}	2
8	(Hungary) Mihály Kótai	Jun 4, 2005 – Mar 3, 2006	1
9	(United Kingdom) Steve Conway	Mar 3, 2006 – Jun 3, 2006	0
10	(Hungary) Attila Kovács	Jun 3, 2006 – 2008^{s}	1
11	(Russia) Zaurbek Baysangurov	Dec 4, 2010 – 2012^{s}	1
12	(Russia) Zaurbek Baysangurov (2)	Apr 12, 2014 – 2015^{s}	0
13	(Cuba) Erislandy Lara	Jun 12, 2015 – Apr 7, 2018	4
14	(United States) Jarrett Hurd	Apr 7, 2018 – May 11, 2019	1
15	(United States) Julian Williams	May 11, 2019 – Jan 18, 2020	0
16	(Dominican Republic) Jeison Rosario	Jan 18, 2020 – Apr 1, 2020^{r}	0
17	(United States) Erislandy Lara (2)	Aug 29, 2020 – Sep 1, 2021^{r}	0
18	(United Kingdom) Sam Eggington	Jun 25, 2022 – Oct 8 2022	0
19	(Republic of Ireland) Dennis Hogan	Oct 8, 2022 – May 20, 2023	0
20	(United Kingdom) JJ Metcalf	May 20, 2023 – 2024	0
21	(Mexico) Jorge Garcia Perez	Jun 15, 2024 – 2024	0
22	(Angola) Uisma Lima	Dec 12, 2024 – present	1

== Welterweight ==
No.	Name	Duration of reign	Defenses
1	(United States) Kenny Gould	Jan 8, 1993 – 1993^{r}	0
2	(United States) Johnny Bizzarro	Aug 18, 1993 – Aug 4, 1994	1
3	(United States) Roger Mayweather	Aug 4, 1994 – 1995^{r}	1
4	(United States) Kip Diggs	Jun 30, 1995 – 1995^{r}	0
5	(United Kingdom) Kevin Lueshing	Jul 17, 1996 – Jan 11, 1997^{s}	0
6	(United States) José Antonio Rivera	Apr 25, 1997 – 1998^{r}	0
7	(South Africa) Dingaan Thobela	Mar 6, 1999 – 1999^{r}	0
8	(South Africa) Peter Malinga	Oct 22, 1999 – 2000^{r}	0
9	(United States) Willy Wise	Dec 2, 2000 – Jun 11, 2001	0
10	(United Kingdom) Jawaid Khaliq	Jun 11, 2001 – Feb 2006^{s}	7
11	(United States) Floyd Mayweather Jr.	Apr 8, 2006 – 2007^{r}	1
12	(South Africa) Isaac Hlatshwayo	May 12, 2007 – 2008^{r}	2
13	(Australia) Lovemore Ndou	Jul 11, 2009 – 2010^{s}	2
14	(South Africa) Chris van Heerden	Sep 24, 2011 – 2014^{s}	2
15	(South Africa) Ali Funeka	Nov 15, 2014 – Jul 24, 2015	0
16	(South Africa) Tsiko Mulovhedzi	Jul 24, 2015 – 2017^{s}	1
17	(South Africa) Thulani Mbenge	Jun 25, 2018 – Jul 6, 2019	1
18	(Germany) Sebastian Formella	Jul 6, 2019 – Aug 22, 2020^{s}	1
19	(Kazakhstan) Daniyar Yeleussinov	Dec 18, 2021 – Dec 27, 2022^{s}	0
20	(South Africa) Thulani Mbenge	Oct 19, 2024 – Present	0

== Super lightweight ==
No.	Name	Duration of reign	Defenses
1	(United States) Mike Evgen	Apr 9, 1992 – 1992^{r}	0
2	(United States) Mike Johnson	Feb 19, 1993 – 1994^{r}	1
3	(United States) Roger Mayweather	May 28, 1994 – 1994^{r}	0
4	(Australia) Lester Ellis	Dec 3, 1994 – 1995^{r}	0
5	(Mexico) Mario Martínez	Jul 29, 1995 – 1995^{r}	0
6	(Australia) Darrell Hiles	Sep 23, 1995 – 1995^{r}	0
7	(United States) Verdell Smith	Jan 18, 1996 – 1996^{r}	0
8	(Israel) Johar Abu Lashin	Feb 28, 1997 – 1997^{r}	0
9	(United States) Israel Cardona	Apr 25, 1997 – 1997^{r}	0
10	(Colombia) Ener Julio	Sep 12, 1998 – 1998^{r}	1
11	(Colombia) Newton Villarreal	Feb 5, 2000 – Apr 7, 2001	2
12	(United Kingdom) Billy Schwer	Apr 7, 2001 – Jul 14, 2001	0
13	(Argentina) Pablo Daniel Sarmiento	Jul 14, 2001 – May 8, 2004	3
14	(United Kingdom) Colin Lynes	May 8, 2004 – 2005^{r}	1
15	(United States) Stevie Johnston	Jan 27, 2006 – 2006^{r}	0
16	(United Kingdom) Ricky Hatton	Jan 20, 2007 – May 2, 2009	3
17	(Philippines) Manny Pacquiao	May 2, 2009 – 2010^{s}	0
18	(South Africa) Kaizer Mabuza	Mar 3, 2012 – Jun 20, 2012	0
19	(Russia) Khabib Allakhverdiev	Jun 20, 2012 – Apr 12, 2014	2
20	(Russia) Eduard Troyanovsky	Apr 10, 2015 – Dec 3, 2016	3
21	(Namibia) Julius Indongo	Dec 3, 2016 – Aug 7, 2017^{s}	1
22	(France) Mohamed Mimoune	Jan 20, 2018 – Apr 27, 2019^{s}	1
23	(Argentina) Jeremias Ponce	Sep 14, 2019 – May 25, 2021	0
24	(Kazakhstan) Zhankosh Turarov	March 21, 2023 – 2024	1
25	(United Kingdom) Adam Azim	February 1, 2025 – ?^{r}	1
26	(Republic of Ireland) Pierce O'Leary	March 14, 2026 − August 1, 2026	0
27	(United Kingdom) Mark Chamberlain	August 1, 2026 – present	0

== Lightweight ==
No.	Name	Duration of reign	Defenses
1	(United States) Anthony Boyle	Dec 28, 1993 – 1994^{r}	0
2	(Philippines) Amado Cabato	Dec 11, 1994 – Mar 10, 1995	0
3	(Australia) Lester Ellis	Mar 10, 1995 – 1995^{r}	0
4	(Canada) Billy Irwin	Jun 8, 1995 – 1995^{r}	0
5	(United States) Leavander Johnson	Jul 29, 1995 – 1996^{r}	0
6	(Canada) Tony Pep	Mar 7, 1996 – 1997^{r}	1
7	(United Kingdom) Michael Ayers	Mar 12, 1999 – Dec 26, 2001^{r}	6
8	(United Kingdom) Jason Cook	Nov 8, 2003 – Nov 5, 2004	1
9	(Argentina) Aldo Nazareno Ríos	Nov 5, 2004 – 2005^{r}	0
10	(South Africa) Isaac Hlatshwayo	Aug 31, 2005 – 2006^{r}	2
11	(United States) Juan Díaz	Sep 6, 2008 – Feb 28, 2009^{s}	0
12	(South Africa) Mlungisi Dlamini	Oct 31, 2009 – Jan 29, 2010 (died in a vehicular accident)	0
13	(Australia) Leonardo Zappavigna	Mar 6, 2010 – 2010^{s}	0
14	(Italy) Emiliano Marsili	Jan 20, 2012 – 2012^{s}	0
15	(Indonesia) Daud Yordan	Jul 6, 2013 – 2014^{s}	1
16	(South Africa) Xolisani Ndongeni	Nov 28, 2015 – 2016^{s}	0
17	(Ghana) Emmanuel Tagoe	Dec 2, 2016 – Jun 13, 2018^{s}	1
18	(Mexico) Jovanni Straffon	May 1, 2021 – Sep 4, 2021	0
19	(United Kingdom) Maxi Hughes	Sep 4, 2021 – Jul 22, 2023	2
20	(Australia) George Kambosos Jr	Jul 22, 2023 – May 12, 2024^{s}	0

== Super featherweight ==
No.	Name	Duration of reign	Defenses
1	(United States) John Roby	Apr 3, 1993 – Apr 21, 1994	0
2	(United States) Jeff Mayweather	Apr 21, 1994 – Aug 25, 1995	2
3	(United States) Israel Cardona	Aug 25, 1995 – 1995^{r}	0
4	(Denmark) Jimmi Bredahl	Mar 29, 1996 – 1996^{r}	0
5	(United States) Israel Cardona (2)	Apr 12, 1996 – 1996^{r}	0
6	(United States) Troy Dorsey	Oct 18, 1996 – 1997^{r}	0
7	(United Kingdom) Charles Shepherd	Jul 31, 1999 – Feb 26, 2000	0
8	(Algeria) Affif Djelti	Feb 26, 2000 – 2002^{r}	3
9	(South Africa) Cassius Baloyi	Apr 17, 2002 – Jul 29, 2006	5
10	(Australia) Gairy St Clair	Jul 29, 2006 – Nov 4, 2006^{s}	0
11	(South Africa) Cassius Baloyi (2)	Feb 3, 2007 – 2007^{r}	0
12	(Australia) Billy Dib	Jul 30, 2008 – 2008^{s}	0
13	(South Africa) Zolani Marali	Apr 2, 2009 – Sep 12, 2009	0
14	(South Korea) Kim Ji-hoon	Sep 12, 2009 – 2010^{r}	0
15	(Australia) Will Tomlinson	Nov 30, 2011 – 2014^{s}	3
16	(Puerto Rico) José Pedraza	Mar 22, 2014 – 2014^{s}	0
17	(Australia) Jack Asis	Apr 11, 2015 – Aug 5, 2016	0
18	(South Africa) Malcolm Klassen	Aug 5, 2016 – Aug 5, 2017^{s}	0
19	(Tajikistan) Shavkat Rakhimov	Sep 9, 2017 – Oct 1, 2019^{r}	3
20	(Italy) Michael Magnesi	Nov 27, 2020 – Sep 24, 2022	1
21	(Republic of Ireland) Anthony Cacace	Sep 24, 2022 – 2026	4
22	(Republic of Ireland) Jono Carroll	Mar 14, 2026 – present	0

== Featherweight ==
No.	Name	Duration of reign	Defenses
1	(United States) Derrick Gainer	Nov 30, 1993 – 1994^{r}	0
2	(United States) Radford Beasley	Sep 26, 1997 – 1998^{r}	0
3	(United States) Junior Jones	Apr 10, 1999 – 1999^{r}	0
4	(Mexico) Marco Antonio Barrera	Apr 7, 2001 – 2002^{r}	0
5	(United Kingdom) Naseem Hamed	May 18, 2002 – 2002^{r}	0
6	(United Kingdom) Michael Brodie	Jun 21, 2003 – 2003^{r}	0
7	(South Africa) Vuyani Bungu	Feb 7, 2004 – Jun 25, 2005	0
8	(South Africa) Thomas Mashaba	Jun 25, 2005 – Mar 7, 2008	4
9	(Mexico) Cristóbal Cruz	Mar 7, 2008 – 2008^{r}	0
10	(Mexico) Fernando Beltrán Jr.	Aug 22, 2008 – 2009^{r}	0
11	(Australia) Jackson Asiku	Nov 6, 2009 – Sep 15, 2010	0
12	(Mexico) Jhonny González	Sep 15, 2010 – 2011^{s}	0
13	(Indonesia) Daud Yordan	May 5, 2012 – Apr 14, 2013	1
14	(South Africa) Simpiwe Vetyeka	Apr 14, 2013 – 2014^{s}	1
15	(South Africa) Lusanda Komanisi	Jul 18, 2014 – 2016^{s}	2
16	(Dominican Republic) Claudio Marrero	Apr 29, 2017 – Sep 15, 2017^{s}	0
17	(Mongolia) Tugstsogt Nyambayar	Jan 26, 2019 – Feb 8, 2020^{r}	0
18	(United Kingdom) Jazza Dickens	Oct 15, 2022 – Jul 22, 2023	0
19	(Argentina) Hector Andres Sosa	Jul 22, 2023 – 2024	1
20	(Cuba) Dayan Gonzalez	Dec 06, 2024 – Present	0

== Super bantamweight ==
No.	Name	Duration of reign	Defenses
1	(United Kingdom) John Lowey	Apr 20, 1995 – 1995^{r}	0
2	(Ukraine) Serhiy Divakov	May 21, 1996 – 1997^{r}	0
3	(United Kingdom) Patrick Mullings	Mar 28, 1998 – Aug 8, 1998	0
4	(South Africa) Simon Ramoni	Aug 8, 1998 – 2001^{r}	3
5	(United States) Paulie Ayala	Aug 4, 2001 – 2002^{r}	1
6	(South Africa) Zolani Marali	Jul 11, 2003 – May 22, 2004	0
7	(South Africa) Thomas Mashaba	May 22, 2004 – 2005^{r}	0
8	(South Africa) Takalani Ndlovu	Nov 4, 2005 – Jul 14, 2007^{s}	3
9	(United States) Mike Oliver	Nov 8, 2007 – 2008^{r}	0
10	(South Africa) Tshifhiwa Munyai	Mar 26, 2011 – 2012^{r}	0
11	(Russia) Alexander Bakhtin	Sep 18, 2012 – Apr 20, 2013^{r}	0
12	(South Africa) Thabo Sonjica	Jul 6, 2013 – Aug 8, 2014^{s}	1
13	(Namibia) Paulus Ambunda	Aug 1, 2015 – Jun 11, 2016	1
14	(Mexico) Moises Flores	Jun 11, 2016 – Jun 17, 2017^{s}	0
15	(Namibia) Paulus Ambunda	Sep 21, 2018 – May 11, 2019	0
16	(United States) Stephen Fulton	May 11, 2019 – Jan 25, 2020^{r}	0
17	(South Africa) Ludumo Lamati	Jun 19, 2021 – May 24, 2022^{r}	0
18	(Mexico) Eric Robles Ayala	Jul 21, 2023 – 2024^{r}	0
19	(United Kingdom) Liam Davies	Mar 16, 2024 – Nov 2, 2024	0
20	(United Kingdom) Shabaz Masoud	Nov 2, 2024 – present	0

== Bantamweight ==
No.	Name	Duration of reign	Defenses
1	(Denmark) Johnny Bredahl	Feb 16, 1996 – Jun 5, 1998^{r}	7
2	(United Kingdom) Noel Wilders	Mar 20, 2000 – 2001^{r}	1
3	(Colombia) José Sanjuanelo	Jul 14, 2001 – Mar 2, 2002	1
4	(South Africa) Silence Mabuza	Mar 2, 2002 – Nov 5, 2005	6
5	(Mexico) Rafael Márquez	Nov 5, 2005 – 2006^{r}	1
6	(South Africa) Silence Mabuza (2)	May 12, 2007 – 2009^{r}	2
7	(South Africa) Simpiwe Vetyeka	Jul 11, 2009 – 2010^{r}	0
8	(Armenia) Vic Darchinyan	May 20, 2010 – Dec 11, 2010^{s}	0
9	(Armenia) Vic Darchinyan (2)	Apr 23, 2011 – Dec 3, 2011^{s}	1
10	(Ghana) Joseph Agbeko	Mar 22, 2013 – 2013^{s}	0
11	(Dominican Republic) Juan Carlos Payano	Aug 2, 2015 – Jun 18, 2016	0
12	(United States) Rau'shee Warren	Jun 18, 2016 – Feb 10, 2017^{s}	0
13	(Philippines) Michael Dasmariñas	Apr 20, 2018 – 2019^{s}	0
14	(Venezuela) Michell Banquez	Jul 12, 2019 – 2021^{s}	0
15	(United Kingdom) Prince Patel	Dec 19, 2023 – April 1, 2024^{r}	0

== Super flyweight ==
No.	Name	Duration of reign	Defenses
1	(Puerto Rico) Ángel Almena	Jul 29, 1995 – 1995^{r}	0
2	(Colombia) Ilido Julio	Sep 19, 1998 – Jan 8, 1999	0
3	(Venezuela) Edison Torres	Jan 8, 1999 – Apr 3, 1999	0
4	(Colombia) Mauricio Pastrana	Apr 3, 1999 – 1999^{r}	0
5	(South Africa) Lunga Ntontela	Dec 13, 2002 – 2003^{r}	0
6	(United Kingdom) Jason Booth	Sep 20, 2003 – Dec 17, 2004	1
7	(United Kingdom) Damaen Kelly	Dec 17, 2004 – February 2006^{s}	0
8	(Tanzania) Mbwana Matumla	Nov 4, 2006 – 2007^{r}	0
9	(Armenia) Vic Darchinyan	Oct 20, 2007 – 2008^{r}	0
10	(South Africa) Zolile Mbityi	May 31, 2008 – 2009^{r}	0
11	(South Africa) Gideon Buthelezi	Nov 10, 2012 – Jun 15, 2013	0
12	(Philippines) Edrin Dapudong	Jun 15, 2013 – Jul 18, 2014	0
13	(South Africa) Lwandile Sityatha	Jul 18, 2014 – 2015^{r}	2
14	(South Africa) Gideon Buthelezi (2)	Dec 18, 2015 – Nov 1, 2021^{s}	3
15	(South Africa) Ricardo Malajika	Sept 2, 2023 – present	3

== Flyweight ==
No.	Name	Duration of reign	Defenses
1	(Canada) Scotty Olson	Dec 9, 1994 – 1998^{r}	5
2	(South Africa) Zolile Mbityi	Oct 22, 1999 – Sep 30, 2000	1
3	(United Kingdom) Damaen Kelly	Sep 30, 2000 – Nov 21, 2001^{s}	1
4	(South Africa) Masibulele Makepula	Jan 26, 2002 – Sep 14, 2002	0
5	(South Africa) Mzukisi Sikali	Sep 14, 2002 – Mar 27, 2005	2
6	(Armenia) Vic Darchinyan	Mar 27, 2005 – Jul 7, 2007	5
7	(Philippines) Nonito Donaire	Jul 7, 2007 – 2009^{r}	3
8	(Puerto Rico) César Seda	Sep 18, 2009 – 2010^{s}	0
9	(South Africa) Moruti Mthalane	Mar 15, 2014 – 2017^{s}	3
10	(Mexico) Maximino Flores	Aug 25, 2019 – 2022	0
11	(Philippines) Dave Apolinario	July 29, 2022 – 2023	0
12	(South Africa) Jackson Chauke	Jan 27, 2024 – Mar 1, 2025	0
13	(South Africa) Ricardo Malajika	Mar 1, 2025 – present	0

== Light flyweight ==
No.	Name	Duration of reign	Defenses
1	(Colombia) José Sanjuanelo	Nov 7, 1998 – Aug 26, 2000	0
2	(Colombia) José García Bernal	Aug 26, 2000 – Apr 17, 2002	1
3	(South Africa) Monelisi Mhikiza Myekeni	Apr 17, 2002 – 2004^{s}	1
4	(South Africa) Hekkie Budler	Feb 27, 2010 – Jan 27, 2011	1
5	(South Africa) Gideon Buthelezi	Jan 27, 2012 – Sep 24, 2011^{s}	0
6	(Philippines) Rey Loreto	Feb 1, 2014 – 2016^{s}	1
7	(South Africa) Hekkie Budler (2)	Feb 4, 2017 – Sep 16, 2017^{s}	0
8	(Indonesia) Tibo Monabesa	Jul 7, 2019 – Mar 1, 2019^{r}	0
9	(South Africa) Mpumelelo Tshabalala	Sep 14, 2024 – present	0

== Minimumweight ==
No.	Name	Duration of reign	Defenses
1	(Philippines) Noel Tuñacao	Mar 8, 2003 – Dec 16, 2003^{r}	0
2	(South Africa) Nkosinathi Joyi	Nov 4, 2006 – Jun 2009^{s}	3
3	(South Africa) Gideon Buthelezi	Jun 19, 2010 – Jan 27, 2011^{r}	0
4	(South Africa) Hekkie Budler	Sep 24, 2011 – Mar 19, 2016^{s}	8
5	(South Africa) Simphiwe Khonco	Jun 11, 2016 – Oct 1, 2019^{r}	4
6	(South Africa) Nkosinathi Joyi (2)	Dec 16, 2019 – May 20, 2021^{s}	0
7	(South Africa) Ayanda Ndulani	May 21, 2021 – May 19, 2023^{r}	1

== See also ==
- List of IBO female world champions
- List of WBA world champions
- List of WBC world champions
- List of IBF world champions
- List of WBO world champions
- List of The Ring world champions
