= Sven Fornling =

Swedish boxer (born 1988)

Personal information
- Born: 8 December 1988 (age 37) Malmö, Sweden
- Weight: Light-heavyweight

Boxing career
- Stance: Orthodox

Boxing record
- Total fights: 17
- Wins: 15
- Win by KO: 7
- Losses: 2

Sven Fornling (born 8 December 1988) is a Swedish former professional boxer. He held the IBO light-heavyweight title from 2018 to 2019 and challenged for the WBA interim light-heavyweight title in 2019.

== Professional career ==
Fornling challenged IBO light-heavyweight champion Karo Murat at Alsterdorfer Sporthalle in Hamburg, Germany, on 15 December 2018. He knocked his opponent to the canvas in the first round and was himself floored in the 12th round. Murat was deducted a point in round 11 for rabbit punches and Fornling went on to win via unanimous decision.

He made the first defense of the title against Dominic Boesel at Halle Messe Arena in Halle, Germany, on 16 November 2019, with the vacant WBA interim light-heavyweight title also up for grabs. Fornling lost by stoppage in the 11th round. He was taken to hospital following the fight where he was diagnosed as having suffered a brain hemorrhage.

Fornling announced his retirement from professional boxing in March 2020.

== Professional boxing record ==
17 fights	15 wins	2 losses
By knockout	7	2
By decision	8	0

No.	Result	Record	Opponent	Type	Round, time	Date	Location	Notes
17	Loss	15–2	Dominic Boesel	TKO	11 (12), 1:12	16 Nov 2019	Halle Messe Arena, Halle, Germany	Lost IBO light-heavyweight title; For vacant WBA interim light-heavyweight title
16	Win	15–1	Karo Murat	UD	12	15 Dec 2018	Alsterdorfer Sporthalle, Hamburg, Germany	Won IBO light-heavyweight title
15	Win	14–1	Karel Horejsek	UD	10	21 Apr 2018	Gärdehov, Sundsvall, Sweden	Retained IBF Baltic light-heavyweight title
14	Win	13–1	Jeppe Morell	RTD	3 (10), 3:00	5 Jan 2018	Frederiksberghallen, Copenhagen, Denmark	Retained IBF Baltic light-heavyweight title
13	Win	12–1	Arijan Sherifi	UD	10	18 Mar 2017	Baltiska Hallen, Malmö, Sweden	Won vacant IBF Baltic light-heavyweight title
12	Win	11–1	Naim Terbunja	UD	8	9 Dec 2016	Rosvalla Arena, Nyköping, Sweden	
11	Loss	10–1	Yevgenii Makhteienko	TKO	5 (10), 1:05	4 Jun 2016	Autohaus Duerkop, Kassel, Germany	
10	Win	10–0	Leo Tchoula	RTD	1 (8), 3:00	24 Apr 2016	Box-Out, Hamburg, Germany	
9	Win	9–0	Gary Abajyan	UD	4	19 Dec 2015	Rosvalla Arena, Nyköping, Sweden	
8	Win	8–0	Simen Smaadal	UD	6	19 Sep 2015	Rosvalla Arena, Nyköping, Sweden	
7	Win	7–0	Josef Krivka	KO	3 (6), 1:16	25 Apr 2015	Surbrunnsparken, Ystad, Sweden	
6	Win	6–0	Aleksandar Todorovic	UD	4	6 Mar 2015	Bruno Gehrke Hall, Berlin, Germany	
5	Win	5–0	Fadil Pasalic	TKO	3 (4), 1:31	22 Nov 2014	Amiralen, Malmö, Sweden	
4	Win	4–0	Alexandros Lessmann	UD	4	31 Oct 2014	Kugelbake-Halle, Cuxhaven, Germany	
3	Win	3–0	Lyubomir Metodiev	KO	3 (4), 2:04	26 Apr 2014	Amiralen, Malmö, Sweden	
2	Win	2–0	Tulio Palhares	KO	1 (4)	27 Mar 2014	Göta Källare, Stockholm, Sweden	
1	Win	1–0	Jovo Paskas	TKO	1 (4), 2:23	8 Nov 2013	Kalmar Sporthall, Kalmar, Sweden	

Sporting positions
Regional boxing titles
New title	IBF Baltic light-heavyweight champion 18 March 2017 – May 2018; Vacated	Vacant Title next held by Jeppe Morell
Minor world boxing titles
Preceded by Karo Murat	IBO light-heavyweight champion 15 December 2018 – 16 November 2019	Succeeded by Dominic Boesel
