= Aslambek Idigov =

Russian boxer (born 1995)

Aslambek Idigov Асламбек Идигов
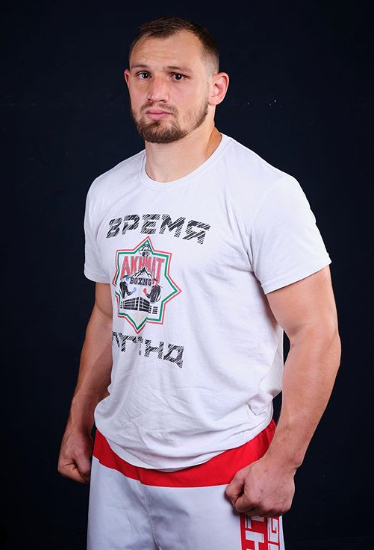

Personal information
- Nickname: The Hulk
- Born: 9 November 1995 (age 30) Grozny, Russia
- Height: 5 ft 8 in (173 cm)
- Weight: Super-middleweight

Boxing career
- Stance: Orthodox

Boxing record
- Total fights: 23
- Wins: 23
- Win by KO: 7
- Losses: 1

Aslambek Ilyasovich Idigov (Russian: Асламбек Ильясович Идигов; born 9 November 1995) is a Russian professional boxer who has held the IBF and WBO European super-middleweight titles since 2019.

== Professional career ==
Idigov made his professional debut on 2 July 2013, scoring a four-round unanimous decision (UD) victory over Serhiy Us at the Spartak Gym in Kyiv, Ukraine.

After compiling a record of 10–0 (4 KOs) he captured his first professional title, the IBO Youth super-middleweight title by defeating Igor Selivanov via UD on 10 December 2016 at the Soviet Wings Sport Palace in Moscow, Russia. One judge scored the bout 100–90 and the other two scored it 99–92, all in favour of Idigov.

He secured another four wins, three by stoppage, before facing Ronny Landaeta for the vacant IBF European and WBO European super-middleweight titles on 18 April 2019 at the Colosseum Sport Hall in Grozny, Russia. Idigov captured the regional titles via majority decision (MD), with two judges scoring the bout 118–112 and 115–113 in favour of Idigov while the third scored it even at 114–114.

== Professional titles held ==
- IBO - International Boxing Organization World Youth Super Middle Title (2016)
- WBO - World Boxing Organisation European Super Middle Title (2019)
- IBF - International Boxing Federation European Super Middle Title (2019)
- WBA - World Boxing Association Asia Super Middle Title (2020)

== Professional boxing record ==
24 fights	23 wins	1 loss
By knockout	7	0
By decision	16	1

No.	Result	Record	Opponent	Type	Round, time	Date	Location	Notes
24	Loss	23–1	Vadim Lubsanov	SD	8	6 Nov 2023	Red Arena, Krasnaya Polyana, Russia	
23	Win	23–0	Meshack Mwankemwa	MD	8	26 Aug 2023	Pyramide, Kazan, Russia	
22	Win	22–0	Abraham Gabriel Buonarrigo	SD	10	26 Aug 2022	Belgrade Waterfront Plato Arena, Belgrade, Serbia	
21	Win	21–0	Sergei Gorokhov	UD	10	3 Nov 2021	Gronzy, Russia	Retained WBO European super-middleweight title
20	Win	20–0	Sherzod Husanov	UD	10	8 Apr 2021	Gronzy, Russia	Retained IBF European and WBO European super-middleweight titles
19	Win	19–0	Stanislav Kashtanov	UD	10	3 Sep 2020	Grozny Colisseum, Gronzy, Russia	Retained WBO European super-middleweight title
18	Win	18–0	Ryan Ford	MD	10	21 Feb 2020	Krylatskoye Sports Palace, Moscow, Russia	
17	Win	17–0	Robert Racz	UD	10	19 Sep 2019	Uvais Akhtaev Sports Palace, Grozny, Russia	Retained IBF European and WBO European super-middleweight titles
16	Win	16–0	Ronny Landaeta	MD	12	18 Apr 2019	Colosseum Sport Hall, Grozny, Russia	Won vacant IBF European and WBO European super-middleweight titles
15	Win	15–0	Konstantin Piternov	RTD	4 (10), 3:00	18 Dec 2018	Pyramide, Kazan, Russia	
14	Win	14–0	Daniel Wanyonyi	TKO	2 (10), 2:32	5 Sep 2018	Amphitheatre, Grozny, Russia	
13	Win	13–0	James Ballard	UD	10	22 Jun 2018	Masonic Temple, Detroit, Michigan, US	
12	Win	12–0	Emmanuel Sanchez	TKO	4 (6), 1:12	11 May 2018	Performance Arts Center, Dearborn, Michigan, US	
11	Win	11–0	Igor Selivanov	UD	10	10 Dec 2016	Soviet Wings Sport Palace, Moscow, Russia	Won vacant IBO Youth super-middleweight title
10	Win	10–0	Karen Avetisyan	SD	6	9 Sep 2016	Soviet Wings Sport Palace, Moscow, Russia	
9	Win	9–0	Davit Ribakoni	UD	6	14 Nov 2015	Ice Palace Terminal, Brovary, Ukraine	
8	Win	8–0	Artur Shchelev	UD	6	7 Mar 2015	Spartak Gym, Kyiv, Ukraine	
7	Win	7–0	Bogdan Protsyshyn	TKO	2 (6), 2:46	15 Nov 2014	Spartak Gym, Kyiv, Ukraine	
6	Win	6–0	Oleksii Shteplyuk	TKO	3 (6), 0:46	19 Apr 2014	Spartak Gym, Kyiv, Ukraine	
5	Win	5–0	Giga Nadiradze	RTD	3 (6), 3:00	1 Mar 2014	Spartak Gym, Kyiv, Ukraine	
4	Win	4–0	Mikhail Lidovskiy	UD	4	16 Dec 2013	Spartak Gym, Kyiv, Ukraine	
3	Win	3–0	Andriy Danichkin	UD	4	9 Nov 2013	Palace of Sports, Kyiv, Ukraine	
2	Win	2–0	Maksym Bogdanov	KO	2 (4), 1:21	14 Sep 2013	Spartak Gym, Kyiv, Ukraine	
1	Win	1–0	Serhiy Us	UD	4	2 Jul 2013	Spartak Gym, Kyiv, Ukraine	
