= Gideon Buthelezi =

South African boxer (born 1986)

Personal information
- Nickname: Hardcore
- Nationality: South African
- Born: Gideon Bongani; 16 July 1986 (age 40) Boipatong, Gauteng, South Africa
- Weight: Minimumweight; Light-flyweight; Super-flyweight

Boxing career
- Stance: southpaw

Boxing record
- Total fights: 29
- Wins: 23
- Win by KO: 5
- Losses: 6

Gideon Buthelezi (born 16 July 1986) is a South African professional boxer. He held the IBO super-flyweight title since 2015, and previously the IBO minimumweight and light-flyweight titles between 2010 and 2011.

== Personal ==
Buthelezi was born Bongani Gideon and resides in Boipatong, Gauteng.He has 3 children. Buthelezi is the second born of the late Nomvula Buthelezi. He has two siblings, Kgalalelo Tshetlo and Stella Malwazi Buthelezi

== Professional career ==
=== Buthelezi vs. Liriano ===
On 29 April 2016, Buthelezi fought and defeated Diego Liriano via unanimous decision, winning on each of the three scorecards, 120–108, 119–109 and 108–111.

=== Buthelezi vs. Leone ===
On 27 July 2018, Buthelezi fought Lucas Leone. Buthelezi won the fight via unanimous decision.

== Professional boxing record ==
29 fights	23 wins	6 losses
By knockout	5	4
By decision	18	2

No.	Result	Record	Opponent	Type	Round, time	Date	Location	Notes
29	Loss	23–6	(Philippines) Dave Apolinario	KO	1 (12), 2:50	29 July 2022	International Convention Centre, East London, South Africa	For vacant IBO flyweight title
28	Win	23–5	(Namibia) Jonas Matheus	SD	10	27 Nov 2021	International Convention Centre, East London, South Africa	
27	Win	22–5	(Mexico) Adrian Jimenez	TKO	1 (12), 1:55	27 Jul 2019	International Convention Centre, East London, South Africa	Retained IBO super flyweight title
26	Win	21–5	(Argentina) Lucas Fernandez	UD	12	27 Jul 2018	International Convention Centre, East London, South Africa	Retained IBO super flyweight title
25	Win	20–5	(Philippines) Ryan Rey Ponteras	UD	12	28 Jul 2017	International Convention Centre, East London, South Africa	Retained IBO super flyweight title
24	Win	19–5	(Mexico) Angel Aviles Armenta	UD	12	31 Mar 2017	Indoor Sports Centre, Kempton Park, South Africa	Retained IBO super flyweight title
23	Win	18–5	(South Africa) Doctor Ntsele	PTS	8	16 Dec 2016	Mdantsane Indoor Centre, Mdantsane, South Africa	
22	Win	17–5	(Dominican Republic) Diego Luis Pichardo Liriano	UD	12	29 Apr 2016	Ngoako Ramatlhodi Sports Complex, Seshego, South Africa	Retained IBO super flyweight title
21	Win	16–5	(South Africa) Makazole Tete	UD	12	18 Dec 2015	Orient Theatre, East London, South Africa	Won vacant IBO super flyweight title
20	Win	15–5	(South Africa) Doctor Ntsele	PTS	12	9 Oct 2015	Pacofs Arena, Bloemfontein, South Africa	Won vacant WBA Pan African super flyweight title
19	Loss	14–5	(South Africa) Lwandile Sityatha	SD	12	24 Jul 2015	International Convention Centre, East London, South Africa	For IBO super flyweight title
18	Win	14–4	(Namibia) Immanuel Naidjala	SD	12	6 Dec 2014	Windhoek Country Club Resort, Windhoek, Namibia	Won WBO Africa bantamweight title
17	Loss	13–4	(Philippines) Edrin Dapudong	KO	1 (12), 2:29	15 Jun 2013	Emperors Palace, Kempton Park, South Africa	Lost IBO super flyweight title
16	Win	13–3	(Philippines) Edrin Dapudong	SD	12	10 Nov 2012	Emperors Palace, Kempton Park, South Africa	Won vacant IBO super flyweight title
15	Loss	12–3	(Mexico) Adrián Hernández	KO	2 (12), 2:20	24 Sep 2011	Foro Polanco, Mexico City, Mexico	For WBC light flyweight title
14	Win	12–2	(South Africa) Hekkie Budler	SD	12	27 Jan 2011	Emperors Palace, Kempton Park, South Africa	Won IBO light flyweight title
13	Win	11–2	(Philippines) Julius Alcos	UD	10	18 Sep 2010	Emperors Palace, Kempton Park, South Africa	
12	Win	10–2	(Philippines) Ronelle Ferreras	UD	12	19 Jun 2010	Emperors Palace, Kempton Park, South Africa	Won vacant IBO minimumweight title
11	Win	9–2	(South Africa) Nelson Mtshali	TKO	4 (12), 1:04	22 Jan 2010	Bloemfontein City Hall, Bloemfontein, South Africa	Won vacant WBO Africa minimumweight title
10	Win	8–2	(South Africa) Thobani Mbangeni	TKO	1 (6)	7 Aug 2009	Mangaung Indoor Centre, Bloemfontein, South Africa	
9	Loss	7–2	(South Africa) Tshepo Lefele	TKO	6 (12), 2:36	12 Sep 2008	Multipurpose Centre, Kestell, South Africa	Lost South African minimumweight title
8	Win	7–1	(South Africa) Jonas Kgasago	SD	12	30 May 2008	Carousel Casino, Hammanskraal, South Africa	Won South African minimumweight title
7	Win	6–1	(South Africa) Thobani Mbangeni	PTS	6	25 Aug 2007	Mdantsane Indoor Centre, Mdantsane, South Africa	
6	Win	5–1	(South Africa) Pule Nhlapo	UD	4	9 Mar 2007	Emnothweni Casino, Nelspruit, South Africa	
5	Win	4–1	(South Africa) Toto Twani	PTS	4	19 Jan 2007	Masizakhe Arena, Carletonville, South Africa	
4	Win	3–1	(South Africa) Siviwe Ntsiko	TKO	3 (4)	25 Nov 2006	Rustenberg, South Africa	
3	Win	2–1	(South Africa) Vuyisele Tshembese	PTS	4	28 Oct 2006	Portuguese Hall, Johannesburg, South Africa	
2	Win	1–1	(South Africa) Alex Malefyane	TKO	3 (4)	12 Aug 2006	Durban, South Africa	
1	Loss	0–1	(Nigeria) Nestor Bolum	UD	4	21 Jul 2006	Goldfields Arena, Carletonville, South Africa	
