= Zhankosh Turarov =

Kazakhstani boxer (born 1991)

Personal information
- Nickname: Da Kazakh Kid
- Born: November 20, 1991 (age 34) Aqkól village
- Height: 175 cm (5 ft 9 in)

Boxing career

Boxing record
- Total fights: 28
- Wins: 28
- Win by KO: 20
- Losses: 0

Zhankosh Turarov (Kazakh: Жанкош Жасұланұлы Тураров / Jankosh Jasulanuly Turarov; born November 20, 1991) is a professional boxer from Kazakhstan who won the IBO light-welterweight title in 2023.

== Early life ==
Zhankosh Turarov born November 20, 1991, in Aqkól village, Talas District (Jambyl Region, Kazakh SSR, USSR). In 2003 he moved to Almaty, in 2004 he started learning boxing with coach Saghatbek Musakhanov.

== Professional career ==
The first battle in 2009 with Talant Ukuev from Kyrgyzstan, ended with Turarov’s victory. In the same year, he defeated Peruvian boxer Frank Paredes, and in 2010 defeated Alisher Payziev from Turkmenistan.

After fights with Johnny Frazier, Franky Martinez and David Castillo (all from the United States) in Nevada, Zhankosh Turarov came to the attention of promoters who invited him to the United States, and in 2013 he arrived in Miami. In the United States, Turarov, along with other well-known Kazakh boxer Kanat Islam, trained under the guidance of Nelson Lopez Jr.

In 2016, in New York, Zhankosh Turarov knocked out his rival Brazilian Joaquim Carneiro Batista in the first round and received the world title according to the National Boxing Association (NBA, not to be confused with World Boxing Association). In September 2017, Turarov fought in Astana with Bruno Leonardo Romay from Argentina and won by unanimous decision.

In April 2019, Zhankosh Turarov signed a contract with the MTK Global management company. Ahmed A. Seddiqi and Askar Salykbayev from MTK Global became his managers. On July 6, 2019, Turarov fought with Argentinean Mauro Maximiliano Godoy for the WBO Inter-Continental junior welterweight title and won in the third round. This victory was the 24th in Turarov’s professional career and allowed him to take 8th place in the WBO ranking in the junior welterweight category.

On December 11, 2022, Zhankosh Turarov (26–0, 19 KOs) knocked out Luis Enrique Romero (11-6-1, 7 KOs) in the 7th round, winning the vacant IBO Inter-Continental junior welterweight belt. This is his 26th victory in his professional career.
