= Stanyslav Kashtanov =

Russian boxer

Personal information
- Nickname: Stas
- Nationality: Ukrainian; Russian
- Born: July 31, 1984 (age 41) Donetsk, Ukraine
- Height: 6 ft 1 in (185 cm)
- Weight: Super middleweight; Light heavyweight

Boxing career
- Stance: Orthodox

Boxing record
- Total fights: 42
- Wins: 36
- Win by KO: 21
- Losses: 6
- Draws: 0
- No contests: 0

Stanyslav Kashtanov (born 31 July 1984 in Donetsk) is a Ukrainian (until 2014) and Russian (since 2015) boxer.

== Career ==
He captured the interim WBA (2012–2013) super middleweight belt on November 10, 2012, in Donetsk, Ukraine, against Server Emurlaev of Ukraine by twelve-round unanimous decision. Champion of Russia among professionals in the light heavyweight (2015).

== Professional boxing record ==
42 fights	36 wins	6 losses
By knockout	21	0
By decision	15	6

No.	Result	Record	Opponent	Type	Round, time	Date	Location	Notes
42	Loss	36–6	Aslambek Idigov	UD	10	3 Sep 2020	Grozny Coliseum, Grozny, Russia	For WBO European super-middleweight title
41	Loss	36–5	Jayde Mitchell	UD	10	23 Nov 2019	State Basketball Centre, Melbourne, Australia	For inaugural IBF Asia Oceania super-middleweight title
40	Loss	36–4	Sergei Ekimov	SD	8	14 Dec 2018	Olimp, Krasnodar, Russia	For vacant Russian light-heavyweight title
39	Loss	36–3	Robin Krasniqi	UD	12	2 Jun 2018	weeArena, Bad Tölz, Germany	For vacant European super-middleweight title
38	Win	36–2	Sergey Khomitsky	MD	10	22 Jul 2017	Red Square, Moscow, Russia	
37	Win	35–2	Tomasz Gargula	TKO	2 (10), 1:32	21 May 2016	Khodynka Ice Palace, Moscow, Russia	Won vacant IBF International super-middleweight title
36	Win	34–2	Bernard Donfack	KO	8 (10), 2:52	12 Dec 2015	VTB Arena, Moscow, Russia	
35	Loss	33–2	Felix Valera	SD	12	23 Aug 2015	Rixos Mriya Resort Hotel, Yalta, Russia	For vacant WBA interim light-heavyweight title
34	Win	33–1	Konstantin Piternov	TKO	5 (10), 1:35	26 Jun 2015	Restaurant Tramplin, Moscow, Russia	Won Russian light-heavyweight title
33	Win	32–1	Mada Maugo	KO	3 (8), 0:30	5 Apr 2015	Sports Palace "Znamya", Noginsk, Russia	
32	Win	31–1	Jaime Barboza	KO	10 (12), 2:40	24 Aug 2013	Donbas Arena, Donetsk, Ukraine	Retained WBA interim super-middleweight title
31	Win	30–1	Server Emurlaev	SD	12	10 Nov 2012	Sport Palace "Druzhba", Donetsk, Ukraine	Won vacant WBA interim super-middleweight title
30	Win	29–1	Jorge Oliveira	RTD	6 (8), 3:00	29 Apr 2012	Donbas Arena, Donetsk, Ukraine	
29	Loss	28–1	Károly Balzsay	SD	12	26 Aug 2011	Donbas Arena, Donetsk, Ukraine	For vacant WBA (Regular) super-middleweight title
28	Win	28–0	Ruslans Pojonisevs	TKO	2 (10), 2:21	30 Aug 2010	Lenin Square, Donetsk, Ukraine	
27	Win	27–0	Andrey Monakhov	UD	6	14 May 2010	Sportpalace Dinamo, Donetsk, Ukraine	
26	Win	26–0	Oļegs Fedotovs	UD	8	20 Feb 2010	Sport Palace "Druzhba", Donetsk, Ukraine	
25	Win	25–0	Vasily Andriyanov	UD	8	3 Oct 2009	Sport Palace "Druzhba", Donetsk, Ukraine	
24	Win	24–0	Andriy Ageev	TKO	6 (8), 2:43	10 Apr 2009	Sport Palace "Druzhba", Donetsk, Ukraine	
23	Win	23–0	Kanstantsin Makhankou	UD	12	29 Nov 2008	Sport Palace "Druzhba", Donetsk, Ukraine	Won vacant European External super-middleweight title
22	Win	22–0	Joílson Silva	KO	1 (10), 1:34	25 Mar 2008	Sport Palace "Druzhba", Donetsk, Ukraine	Retained WBC Youth super-middleweight title
21	Win	21–0	Laurent Goury	UD	8	15 Dec 2007	Sport Palace "Druzhba", Donetsk, Ukraine	
20	Win	20–0	Vikapita Meroro	UD	10	22 Aug 2007	Lenin Square, Donetsk, Ukraine	Retained WBC Youth super-middleweight title
19	Win	19–0	Mantas Tarvydas	UD	10	27 Apr 2004	Circus, Donetsk, Ukraine	Retained WBC Youth super-middleweight title
18	Win	18–0	Makusu Kimfuta	TKO	1 (8)	9 Mar 2007	Sport Palace "Druzhba", Donetsk, Ukraine	
17	Win	17–0	Willbeforce Shihepo	RTD	4 (10), 3:00	23 Dec 2006	Sport Palace "Druzhba", Donetsk, Ukraine	Retained WBC Youth super-middleweight title
16	Win	16–0	Michael Henrotin	UD	10	4 Nov 2006	Salle des Étoiles, Monte Carlo, Monaco	Retained WBC Youth super-middleweight title
15	Win	15–0	Magid Ben Driss	TKO	4 (10)	21 Jul 2006	Sport Palace "Druzhba", Donetsk, Ukraine	Won vacant WBC Youth super-middleweight title
14	Win	14–0	Aliaksei Kanovko	TKO	6 (8), 2:03	28 Feb 2006	Sport Palace "Druzhba", Donetsk, Ukraine	
13	Win	13–0	Sergey Gribkov	TKO	4 (6), 2:00	3 Dec 2005	Sports Palace Yunost, Donetsk, Ukraine	
12	Win	12–0	Ramdane Kaouane	KO	1 (6), 1:34	29 Oct 2005	TURM Erlebnis City, Oranienburg, Germany	
11	Win	11–0	Viachaslau Syrovatka	KO	1 (6)	10 Sep 2005	Ice Palace Sokolniki, Moscow, Russia	
10	Win	10–0	David Dzhidzhelava	UD	6	29 Jun 2005	Sport Palace "Druzhba", Donetsk, Ukraine	
9	Win	9–0	Oleksandr Butenko	RTD	3 (6), 3:00	22 May 2005	Sergey Bubka school of Olympic reserve, Donetsk, Ukraine	
8	Win	8–0	Aliaksandr Vaiavoda	TKO	6 (6), 2:50	16 Mar 2005	Lokomotyv Sports Palace, Kharkiv, Ukraine	
7	Win	7–0	Roman Godovikov	KO	2 (8)	14 Jan 2005	Sport Palace "Druzhba", Donetsk, Ukraine	
6	Win	6–0	Alexander Kostenko	RTD	3 (6), 3:00	22 Sep 2004	Sport Palace "Druzhba", Donetsk, Ukraine	
5	Win	5–0	Krisztián Jaksi	TKO	1 (6), 2:35	23 Jun 2004	Sport Palace "Druzhba", Donetsk, Ukraine	
4	Win	4–0	Makysm Vyshynskyy	UD	4	8 Apr 2004	Sport Palace "Druzhba", Donetsk, Ukraine	
3	Win	3–0	Ivan Beskhmelnitsyn	UD	4	12 Dec 2003	Sport Palace "Druzhba", Donetsk, Ukraine	
2	Win	2–0	Andrey Golius	UD	4	12 Sep 2003	Sports Palace Yunost, Donetsk, Ukraine	
1	Win	1–0	Oleksii Shteplyuk	UD	4	1 Jul 2003	Sports Palace Yunost, Donetsk, Ukraine	

Achievements
Vacant Title last held by Brian Magee	WBA Super Middleweight Interim Champion; November 10, 2012 – September 2, 2014; Retired	Vacant Title last held by Fedor Chudinov
