= Restaurante Arroyo =

- Interactive map of Restaurante Arroyo

Restaurant information
- Established: 1940
- Food type: Mexican
- Location: Av. Insurgentes Sur 4003, Santa Úrsula Xitla, Tlalpan, Mexico City, 14420, Mexico
- Coordinates: 19°17′15″N 99°10′32″W
- Seating capacity: 2,200
- Website: arroyorestaurante.mx

Restaurante Arroyo is the world's largest single Mexican restaurant, located in the Tlalpan area of Mexico City. The restaurant, which employs more than 1,000 people during its peak season, has seating for 2,200 patrons in nine dining rooms, and parking for 600 cars. It also features stages for musical performances, an array of wandering mariachi and jarocho bands, an infirmary, an area for hosting piñata parties, a cockfighting pit, a mechanical bull, and its own bullring.

== History and noted menu items ==
Restaurante Arroyo was founded by José Arroyo and Maréa Aguirre de Arroyo in 1940; their son and grandson still run it. Although its menu has expanded along with its size, its principal claim to gastronomic fame was and is its dishes featuring lamb and mutton, such as barbacoa de borrego (slow-roasted barbecue mutton) and consome de borrego, soup made from the drippings of the roasting lamb and sheep.

The restaurant has been featured on Rick Bayless' PBS cooking show, Mexico: One Plate at a Time. In My Last Supper: 50 Great Chefs and Their Final Meals: Portraits, Interviews, and Recipes, Bayless identified it as the restaurant in which he would choose to have his last meal.

In terms of size and number of diversions for diners, it is similar to the more famous Denver restaurant Casa Bonita.

On January 30, 2010, it hosted two world championship boxing fights: In one, former world champion Jorge Arce defeated noted contender Angky Angkota of Indonesia in a seven-round technical decision for the vacant World Boxing Organization's world bantamweight title; in the other, Jackie Nava defended the interim World Boxing Council's female world Super Bantamweight title with a ten-round unanimous decision victory over Chantal Martínez inside the restaurant area.
