= Joynext Arena =

Ice hockey arena in Dresden, Germany

Coordinates: 51°3′45″N 13°43′20″E

JOYNEXT Arena
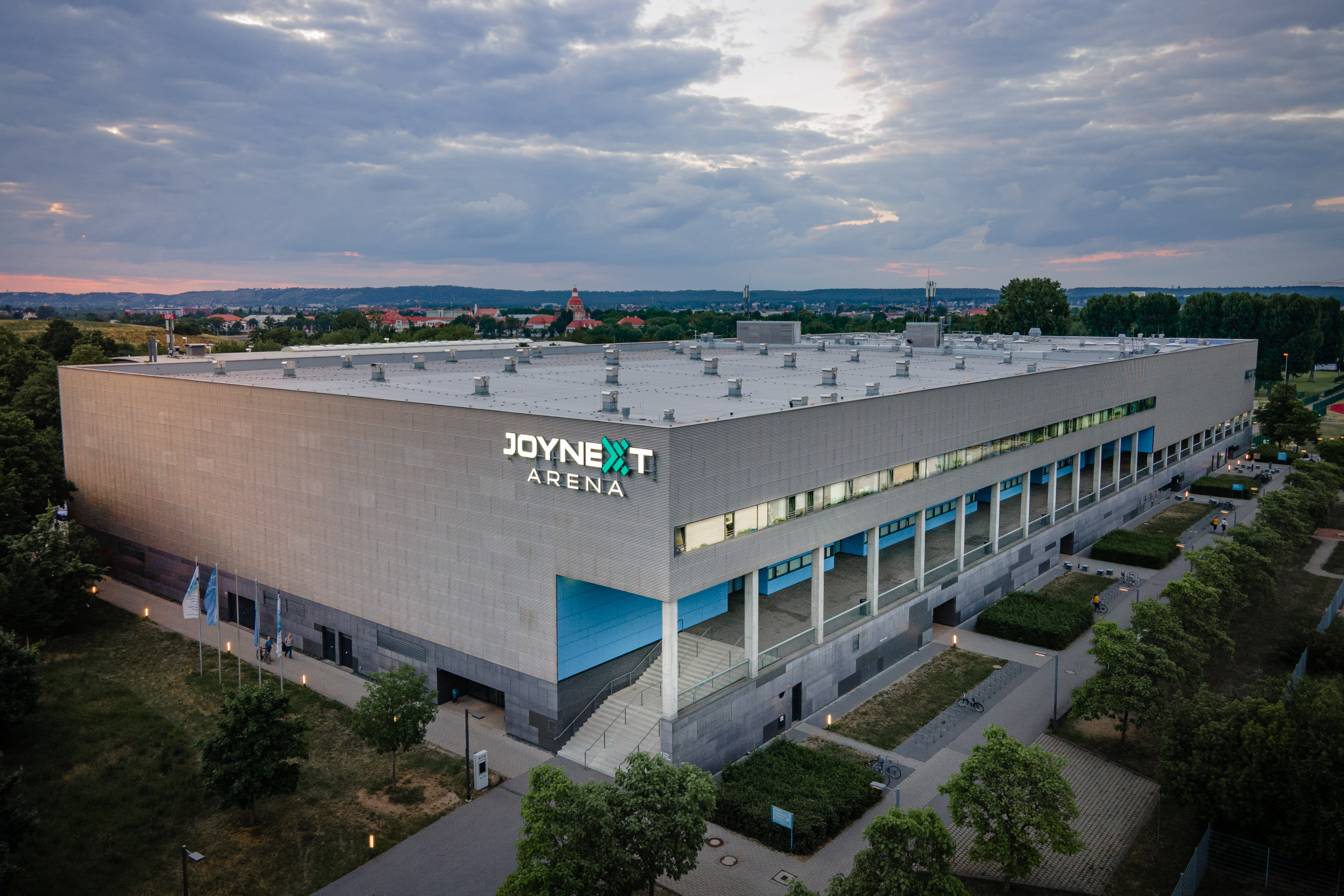

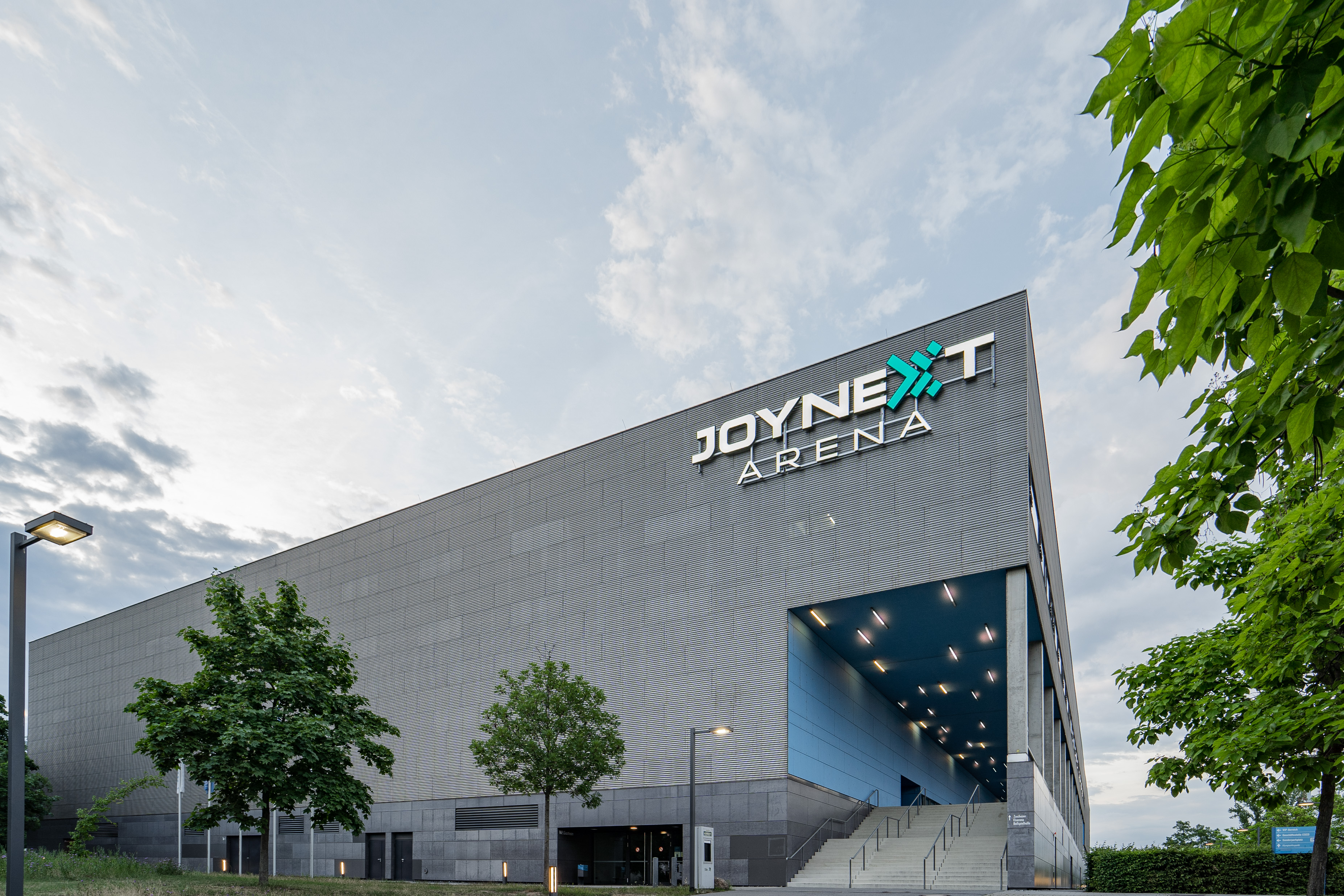
- Interactive map of JOYNEXT Arena
- Location: Dresden, Germany
- Owner: Stadt Dresden
- Capacity: 5,600–6,500 (concerts); 4,412 (ice hockey)

Construction
- Groundbreaking: May, 2005
- Opened: August 31, 2007
- Cost: € 29.7 million
- Architects: Schmidt-Schicketanz, München

Tenant
- Dresdner Eislöwen (2007–present)

Joynext Arena (formerly known as Freiberger Arena and EnergieVerbund Arena) is an ice hockey arena in Dresden, Germany. It is primarily used for the ice hockey club Dresdner Eislöwen.
