= 2023 in Philippine sports =

The following is a list of notable events and developments that are related to Philippine sports in 2023.

== Events ==
=== Athletics ===
- January 26 – Ernest John Obiena claims the silver medal at the International Jump Meeting Cottbus pole vault event at Lausitz-Arena in Cottbus, Germany, after clearing the 5.77-meter mark.
- January 29 – Ernest John Obiena claims the gold medal at the Perche En Or tournament pole vault event in Roubaix, France, after clearing the 5.82-meter mark.
- February 9 – Ernest John Obiena claims the gold medal at the 2023 Orlen Copernicus Cup pole vault event in Toruń, Poland, after clearing the 5.86-meter mark.
- February 11 – Ernest John Obiena claims the silver medal at the ISTAF Indoor Berlin pole vault event at Mercedes-Benz Arena in Berlin, Germany, after clearing the 5.82-meter mark.
- February 12 – Janry Ubas claims the bronze medal at the Asian Indoor Athletics Championships heptathlon event in Astana, Kazakhstan, after tallying 5,246 points.
- June 10 – Ernest John Obiena claims the gold medal at the Bergen Jump Challenge pole vault event in Bergen, Norway, after clearing the 6.00-meter mark for the first time in his career, also breaking the Asian record.
- July 16 – The Philippine athletics team participates at the 2023 Asian Athletics Championships at Bangkok, Thailand with two gold medals after Ernest John Obiena and Robyn Lauren Brown win men's pole vault and women's 400 meter hurdles respectively.
- August 27 – Ernest John Obiena wins the silver medal at the men's pole vault event at the 2023 World Athletics Championships in Budapest, Hungary after clearing the 6.00-meter mark.
- November 8–12 - The Philippines hosts the 22nd Asia Masters Athletics Championships in New Clark City.|

=== Baseball ===
- May 4 – The Philippines national baseball team claims the 2023 East Asian Baseball Cup title after defeating Hong Kong 10–2 in the finals.

=== Basketball ===
- January 12 – President Bongbong Marcos signs into law the naturalization of Barangay Ginebra San Miguel player Justin Brownlee, allowing him to play for the Philippines men's national basketball team.
- January 15 – The Barangay Ginebra San Miguel wins the 2022–23 PBA Commissioner's Cup after defeating Hong Kong-based guest team Bay Area Dragons 4–3 in a do-or-die seven-game series in front of a record-breaking 54,589 gate attendance at the Philippine Arena.
- March 30 – The Pampanga G Lanterns win the PSL Dumper Cup after defeating the defending champion, Davao Occidental Tigers, 2–0 in a best-of-three-game series.
- April 21 – The TNT Tropang Giga wins the 2023 PBA Governors' Cup after defeating Barangay Ginebra San Miguel 4–2 in a best-of-seven-game series.
- June 21 – The UP Fighting Maroons win the 2023 Filoil EcoOil Preseason Cup title after defeating the De La Salle Green Archers 87–76 in the grand final tournament.
- July 1 – The Philippines women's national basketball team finishes sixth at the 2023 FIBA Women's Asia Cup in Sydney, Australia, after losing to South Korea 71–80 in the fifth place playoff.
- July 17 – The Philippines women's national under-17 basketball team wins the 2023 FIBA Under-16 Women's Asian Championship Division B Tournament after defeating Iran 83–60 in the finals. The team was promoted to Division A for the next tournament.
- July 30 – The Ateneo Blue Eagles win the 2023 AsiaBasket Las Piñas Championship after defeating CSB Blazers at score 60–57 in the final tournament.
- August 23 – Carlos Loyzaga is posthumously inducted to the FIBA Hall of Fame at Sofitel Philippine Plaza Manila in Pasay.
- August 25 – September 10 – The Philippines co-hosts the 2023 FIBA Basketball World Cup with Indonesia and Japan. Among the three host countries, the Philippines will host most of the matches, including the final, which will be held at the Mall of Asia Arena in Pasay. Other matches take place at the Araneta Coliseum in Quezon City and the Philippine Arena in Bocaue, Bulacan.
  - September 2 – The Philippine men's national basketball team finishes at 24th place at 2023 FIBA Basketball World Cup with a 1–4 win-loss record. The team qualifies to the 2024 FIBA Olympic Qualifying Tournament.
- September 25 – The Philippines men's national under-17 basketball team finishes at fourth place at the 2023 FIBA Under-16 Asian Championship in Doha, Qatar after losing to China 57–89 in the bronze medal game. The team qualifies to the 2024 FIBA Under-17 Basketball World Cup.
- October 6 – The Philippines men's national basketball team wins the 2022 Asian Games basketball tournament after defeating Jordan 70–60. This is the first championship title for the Philippines since 1962.
- November 11 – The CSB Blazers win the 2023 AsiaBasket Dasmariñas Championship after defeating US-based team Statham Academy in the championship game, 105–86.
- December 2 – The Pampanga Giant Lanterns wins the 2023 MPBL finals after defeating Bacoor City Strikers by a 3–0 sweep five-game series.
- December 6 – The De La Salle Green Archers win the UAAP Season 86 men's basketball tournament after defeating the UP Fighting Maroons 2–1 in a do-or-die three-game series.
- December 17 – The San Beda Red Lions win the NCAA Season 99 basketball tournaments after defeating the Mapúa Cardinals 2–1 in a do-or-die three-game series.

=== Bowling ===
- July 10 – The Philippine bowling team wins the 2023 Asian Youth Tenpin Bowling Championships in Bangkok, Thailand after tallying 4,933 points.

=== Boxing ===
- January 6 – Melvin Jerusalem claims the WBO minimumweight title after defeating Masataka Taniguchi via technical knockout in the second round.
- February 12 – Eumir Marcial defeats Ricardo Villalba via technical knockout in the second round, remaining undefeated as a professional boxer at 4–0 record.
- March 5 – Mark Magsayo loses to Brandon Figueroa via unanimous decision for the WBC interim featherweight title at Toyota Arena in Ontario, California, United States.
- April 9 – Marlon Tapales defeats Murodjon Akhmadaliev via split decision to claim both the WBA and IBF super bantamweight titles.
- April 16 – Rene Mark Cuarto loses to Ginjiro Shigeoka via knockout in the ninth round for the IBF minimumweight title.
- May 13 – John Riel Casimero claims the WBO global junior featherweight title after defeating Fillipus Nghitumbwa via unanimous decision at Okada Manila in Parañaque.
- May 14 – Vincent Astrolabio loses to Jason Moloney via majority decision for the vacant WBO bantamweight title.
- May 28 – Melvin Jerusalem loses to Oscar Collazo via technical knockout for the WBO minimumweight title.
- June 25:
  - Jerwin Ancajas defeats Wilner Soto via knockout in the fifth round.
  - Jade Bornea loses to Fernando Martínez via technical knockout in the eleventh round for the IBF world junior bantamweight title.
- July 30 – Nonito Donaire loses to Alexandro Santiago via unanimous decision for WBC bantamweight title at T-Mobile Arena in Las Vegas, Nevada, United States
- October 12 – John Riel Casimero ends with technical draw against Yukinori Oguni in the fourth round.
- December 10 – Mark Magsayo wins against Isaac Avelar via knockout in the third round.
- December 26 – Marlon Tapales loses to Naoya Inoue for the undisputed bantamweight championship via technical knockout in the tenth round.

=== Chess ===
- February 18 – Daniel Quizon claims the ASEAN Chess Championship title after defeating International Master Rolando Nolte in the grand final tournament in Quezon City. He also clinched into grandmaster.
- August 4 – Eugene Torre wins 2023 Guam International Open Chess Tournament in Guam with undefeating 9–0 record.

=== Cue sports ===
- July 3 – The Philippine pool team consists of James Aranas and Johann Chua wins 2023 World Cup of Pool title after defeating Joshua Filler and Moritz Neuhausen of Germany 11–7 in the grand final tournament.
- October 23 – Chezka Centeno wins 2023 WPA Women's World Ten-ball Championship after defeating Han Yu of China 9–5 in the grand final tournament.

=== Cycling ===
- July 15–16 – The 2023 ACC BMX Racing and Freestyle Championships takes place in Tagaytay with cyclists from eight nations participating.

=== Esports ===
- January 15 – ECHO Philippines claim the MLBB M4 World Championship title after defeating a fellow Filipino rival and defending champions Blacklist International 4–0 in the grand final tournament in Jakarta, Indonesia.
- May 1 – TNT Tropang Giga claim the inaugural PBA Esports Bakbakan championship title after defeating Barangay Ginebra San Miguel at score 2–1.
- May 7 – ECHO Philippines claim the MPL Philippines Season 11 title after defeating the defending champion Blacklist International 4–0 in the grand final tournament.
- June 18 – Blacklist International loses to ONIC Esports for Mobile Legends: Bang Bang Southeast Asia Cup (MSC) 2023 title at a score of 4–2 in the grand final tournament.
- August 13 – OMO Abyssinian won the silver medal at the Pokémon Unite World Championship Series 2023 at Yokohama, Japan after being defeated by Luminosity Gaming of Canada in the grand final tournament.
- October 29 – AP Bren wins MPL Philippines Season 12 title after defeating Blacklist International 4–1 in the grand final tournament.
- November 19 – RSG Philippines wins MLBB Invitational 2023 after defeating ECHO Philippines 3–1 in the grand final tournament.
- December 2 – 17 – the Philippines take place to host MLBB M5 World Championship, the first time the country will host a Mobile Legends: Bang Bang World Championship. The tournament concludes with AP Bren wins against ONIC Esports 4–3 in the final.

=== Football ===
- February 2 – The Asian Football Confederation re-elects Philippine Football Federation president Mariano Araneta to another four-year term as a representative of the confederation in the FIFA Council.
- February 16 – Philippines Football League defending champions United City F.C. suspend their operations as a professional football club and withdraw from the remainder of the 2022–23 season, citing financial difficulties following a legal dispute with a Singapore-based investor.
- March 1–2 – The FIFA Women's World Cup trophy visits the Philippines for the first time as part of the marketing campaign for the 2023 FIFA Women's World Cup, which the Philippines women's national football team qualified for the first time in 2022. The trophy is publicly displayed in Glorietta in Makati.
- May 18 – The FEU Tamaraw Booters claim the UAAP Season 85 men's football title after defeating the Ateneo Blue Booters 4–1 in the final at the Rizal Memorial Stadium.
- May 21 – The FEU Lady Tamaraw Booters claim the UAAP Season 85 women's football title after defeating the De La Salle Lady Booters 2–1 after extra time in the final at the Rizal Memorial Stadium.
- May 24 – Kaya F.C.–Iloilo win the 2022–23 Philippines Football League to claim their first Philippines Football League title. With the win, the team also qualifies for the 2023–24 AFC Champions League group stage.
- July 20–30 – The Philippines women's national football team participates at the 2023 FIFA Women's World Cup in Australia and New Zealand with one win and two losses after Sarina Bolden got her first World Cup goal. It is the first time that the Philippines plays at a FIFA World Cup of any gender or age level.
- November 11 – Kaya F.C. wins the 2023 PFF Women's League after defeating Manila Digger at score of 1–0 in the final tournament.
- November 25 – John Anthony Gutierrez elects as president of Philippine Football Federation
- December 9 – Kaya F.C.–Iloilo wins the 2023 Copa Paulino Alcantara title after defeating Davao Aguilas F.C. 4–3 in penalty shootout following 1–1 draw in final tournament.

=== Golf ===
- March 19 – Miguel Tabuena claims the DGC Open title in New Delhi, India.

=== Gymnastics ===
- February 27 – Carlos Yulo claims the bronze medal at the 2023 World Artistic Gymnastics Championships parallel bars event in Cottbus, Germany, after scoring 15.166 points.
- March 3–4 – Carlos Yulo claims the gold medal at the floor exercise event and the bronze medal at the vault event at the 2023 FIG Artistic Gymnastics World Cup series in Doha, Qatar.
- March 12 – Carlos Yulo claims two gold medals at the 2023 FIG World Cup parallel bars and vault events in Baku, Azerbaijan.
- June 17–18 – Carlos Yulo claims three gold medals at the floor exercise, parallel bars, and vault events, and a silver medal at the individual all-around event, at the 2023 Asian Artistic Gymnastics Championships in Singapore.

=== Ice hockey ===
- March 26 – The Philippines men's national ice hockey team claims the 2023 IIHF World Championship Division IV title after defeating three teams via a round-robin tournament. The team was promoted to Division III for the next tournament.

=== Lawn bowls ===
- February 28 – The Philippine delegation captures three gold and two bronze medals at the 14th Asian Lawn Bowls Championship in Ipoh, Malaysia.

=== Mixed martial arts ===
- February 17 – Fritz Biagtan defeats Nurmukhammad Adamkohonov via knockout in the third round at ONE Friday Fights 5 in Bangkok, Thailand.
- February 25 – Danny Kingad defeats Eko Roni Saputra via unanimous decision at ONE Fight Night 7 in Bangkok, Thailand.
- August 6 – Team Lakay's founder and head coach's son, Jhanlo Mark Sangiao suffer his first lost against Enkh-Orgil Baatarkhuu via stoppage (kimura choke) at ONE Fight Night 13 in Bangkok
- September 30 – former ONE Lightweight World Champion Eduard Folayang of his newly-formed Lions Nation MMA beats Amir Khan via technical knockout and Stephen Loman of Team Lakay lost to the former ONE Bantamweight World Champion John Lineker via unanimous decision at ONE Fight Night 14 in Singapore
- October 7 – former ONE Strawweight World Champion Joshua Pacio defeats undefeated wrestler Mansur Malachiev via unanimous decision at ONE Fight Night 15 in Bangkok, Thailand
- November 4 – Lito Adiwang defeats compatriot Jeremy Miado via unanimous decision at ONE Fight Night 16 in Bangkok, Thailand

=== Motorsports ===
- May 6 – Bianca Bustamante of Prema Racing wins the second race of the second round of the 2023 F1 Academy season at Circuit Ricardo Tormo in Cheste, Valencian Community, Spain, marking her first career win and becoming the first Filipino to win an F1 Academy race.
- July 9 – Bianca Bustamante of Prema Racing wins the third race of the third round of the 2023 F1 Academy season at Monza Circuit in Milan, Italy.
- October 18 – Bianca Bustamante signs with the McLaren Driver Development Programme, the first female driver to do so.

=== Softball ===
- April 8 – The Philippines women's national softball team finishes at fourth place at the 2023 Asian Women's Softball Championship in Incheon, South Korea, after being defeated by Chinese Taipei at score of 5–10. The team, however, qualified for the 2024 Women's Softball World Cup.

=== Tennis ===
- March 13 – Francis Alcantara and his Thai partner Pruchya Isaro win the M25 New Delhi doubles tournament of the 2023 ITF Men's World Tennis Tour after defeating Indian pair Parikshit Somani and Manish Sureshkumar in two sets, 6–2, 6–4.
- June 3 – Francis Alcantara and his Japanese partner Hiroki Moriya win the M25 Jakarta doubles tournament of the 2023 ITF Men's World Tennis Tour after defeating Indonesian pair Nathan Anthony Barki and Christopher Rungkat in two sets, 6–2, 6–1.
- June 4 – Alex Eala wins the W25 Yecla singles tournament of the 2023 ITF Women's World Tennis Tour after defeating Valentina Ryser of Switzerland in two sets, 6–3, 7–5.
- June 12 – Francis Alcantara and Hiroki Moriya win the M25 Nakhon Si Thammarat doubles tournament of the 2023 ITF Men's World Tennis Tour after defeating Maximus Jones of Thailand and Finn Reynolds of New Zealand in two sets, 6–2, 6–4.

=== Volleyball ===
- March 30:
  - The Creamline Cool Smashers claims the 2023 Premier Volleyball League First All-Filipino Conference title after defeating Petro Gazz Angels 2–1 in a best-of-three-game series.
  - The Cignal HD Spikers claims the 2023 Spikers' Turf Open Conference after defeating AMC Cotabato Spikers 2–0 in a best-of-three-game series.
- May 14 – The De La Salle Lady Spikers claims the UAAP Season 85 women's volleyball title after defeating the defending champions NU Lady Bulldogs 2–0 in a best-of-three-game series.
- June 25 – The Philippines women's national volleyball team finishes at seventh place at 2023 Asian Women's Volleyball Challenge Cup after defeating Uzbekistan in four sets 25–14, 13–25, 25–18, 25–18.
- July 4–9 – The Philippines co-hosts 2023 FIVB Volleyball Men's Nations League preliminary rounds at the Mall of Asia Arena in Pasay.
- July 15 – The Philippines men's national volleyball team finishes at tenth place at 2023 Asian Men's Volleyball Challenge Cup after losing to Chinese Taipei in four sets 22–25, 17–25, 28–26, 22–25.
- July 30 – Japan-based guest team Kurashiki Ablaze wins 2023 Premier Volleyball League Invitational Conference after defeating Creamline Cool Smashers in five sets 19–23, 25–23, 25–19, 20–25, 15–13.
- August 26 – The Choco Mucho Flying Titans finishes bronze medal at 2023 VTV International Women's Volleyball Cup in Lào Cai, Vietnam after defeating Kansai University of Social Welfare of Japan in four sets 25–20, 23–25, 25–13, 25–18.
- September 5 – The Philippines women's national volleyball team finishes at thirteenth place at 2023 Asian Women's Volleyball Championship after defeating Uzbekistan in three sets 25–20, 25–17, 25–23.
- September 29 – The De La Salle Green Spikers and Benilde Lady Blazers wins 2023 V-League Collegiate Challenge men's and women's division respectively.
- December 16 – The Creamline Cool Smashers wins 2023 Premier Volleyball League Second All-Filipino Conference after defeating Choco Mucho Flying Titans 2–0 in a best-of-three-game series.
- December 21 – The Bacoor City Strikers wins inaugural MPVA season after defeating Negros–ICC Blue Hawks 2–1 in a do-or-die three-game series.

=== Weightlifting ===
- March 27 – The Philippine delegation claims 7 gold, 4 silver, and a bronze medal at 2023 Youth World Weightlifting Championships at Ramazan Njala Sports Palace in Durrës, Albania.
- July 29 – Angeline Colonia wins three gold medals in women's 45 kg. category at the 2023 Asian Youth and Junior Weightlifting Championships in New Delhi, India.
- August 2 – Vanessa Sarno wins three gold medals in women's 71 kg. category at the 2023 Asian Youth and Junior Weightlifting Championships in New Delhi, India.

=== Multi-sports events ===
- May 5–17 – The 814-strong Philippine delegation participates at the 2023 Southeast Asian Games in Phnom Penh, Cambodia, finishing at fifth place overall after winning 58 gold, 86 silver, and 116 bronze medals.
- June 3–9 – The 172-strong Philippine delegation participates at the 2023 ASEAN Para Games in Phnom Penh, Cambodia, finishing at fifth place overall after winning 33 gold, 33 silver, and 50 bronze medals.
- July 29 – August 5 – The 63rd edition of Palarong Pambansa was held in Marikina, the first edition since the COVID-19 pandemic. It concludes with the National Capital Region wins overall medal tally with 85 gold, 74 silver, and 55 bronze medals.
- September 23 – October 8 – The 305-strong Philippine delegation participates at the 2022 Asian Games in Hangzhou, China, initially scheduled for the previous year but was postponed due to the COVID-19 pandemic. It finishing at 17th place after winning 4 gold, 2 silver, and 12 bronze medals.
- October 22–28 – The Philippines participates at the 2022 Asian Para Games in Hangzhou, China, initially scheduled for the previous year but was postponed due to the COVID-19 pandemic. It finishing at 9th place after winning 10 gold, 4 silver, and 5 bronze medals.
- November 17–26 – The Philippines participates at the 2021 Asian Indoor and Martial Arts Games in Bangkok and Chonburi, Thailand, initially scheduled for 2021 but postponed due to the COVID-19 pandemic.
- December 15–22 – The seventh edition of Philippine National Games and fourteenth edition of Batang Pinoy is simultaneously held in Manila.

== Deaths ==
- February 1 – Terry Saldaña (b. 1958), former basketball player
- February 28 – Rob Luna (b. 1985), Esports commentator
- March 1 – Emmanuel "Boybits" Victoria (b. 1971), former basketball player
- April 19 – Ed Picson (b. 1953), president and chief executive officer of the Association of Boxing Alliances in the Philippines
- April 23 – Charles Dave "Chad Devs" dela Peña (b. 1995), esports player
- April 24 – Ivan Emmanuel "Navi" Gacho (b. 1998), former esports player and coach
- May 4 – Yoro Sangare (b. 2001), football player (UP Fighting Maroons)
- May 10 – Kenneth Egano (b. 2000), professional boxer
- August 25 – Rey Gamboa (b. 1942), founder of the Philippine Collegiate Champions League
- November 5 – Ato Tolentino (b. 1947), basketball player and college coach
- November 22 – Antonio Genato (b. 1929), basketball player
- December 23 – Samboy Lim (b. 1962), basketball player

== See also ==
- 2023 in the Philippines
- 2023 in sports
