= 38th SAC-SMB Cebu Sports Awards =

Annual awarding ceremony

2024 38th SAC-SMB Cebu Sports Awards
- Date: May 26, 2024
- Location: The Terraces, Ayala Center Cebu, Cebu City
- Country: Philippines

The 38th San Miguel Beer (SMB) - Sportswriters Association of Cebu (SAC) Cebu Sports Awards is an annual awarding ceremony that recognized the triumphs and accomplishments of Cebuano sports personalities (athletes, coaches, teams and organizations) in the past three years throughout the COVID-19 pandemic and in the previous editions of the Olympics, Asian Games, and the Southeast Asian Games. The Cebu Sports Awards is the local counterpart of the yearly Philippine Sportswriters Association Annual Awards Night. The awards night is the first edition since the COVID-19 pandemic in the country.

The awarding rites is organized by the Sportswriters Association of Cebu, an organization led by sportswriters and sports columnists from newspapers and online portals based in Cebu such as Sun.Star Cebu, The Freeman and Cebu Daily News Digital led by its president and concurrent Cebu City Sports Commissioner John Pages.

The event was held on May 26, 2024, at the Terraces of Ayala Center Cebu in Cebu City.

== Honor roll ==
=== Main awardees ===
Award	Winner	Sport / team / profession / recognition	References
Athlete of the Year	June Mar Fajardo; Melvin Jerusalem; William John Riley Go	Basketball; Boxing; Karting	
Rico Navarro Sportsman of the Year	Rhoel Dejano	Cebu City Sports Commissioner	
Presidential Awardee	Edward Hayco	Philippine Sports Commission (PSC) Commissioner	
Orlacsan Award	Jefferson Codera	Basketball	
Orlacsan Award	Jerry Maratas	Chess	
Orlacsan Award	Jeah Jing Gacang	Chess	
Orlacsan Award	Jessica Jawad-Honoridez	Table Tennis	
Posthumous Award	Rico Navarro	Basketball	
Posthumous Award	George Bragat	Basketball	
Posthumous Award	Ricky Ballesteros	Marathon	
Posthumous Award	Raffy Uytierpo	Marathon/Running	
Posthumous Award	Dionisio Cañete	Arnis	
Major Awardees	June Mar Fajardo	Basketball	
Major Awardees	Melvin Jerusalem	Boxing	
Major Awardees	Trixie Lofranco	Arnis	
Major Awardees	Dexler Bolambao	Arnis	
Major Awardees	Ella Alcoseba	Arnis	
Major Awardees	Rubilen Amit	Billiards	
Major Awardees	Junia Gabasa	Golf	
Major Awardees	Angelo Marquez	Dancesport	
Major Awardees	Polaris Esports	Esports (Dota 2)	
Major Awardees	Eliecha Zoe Malilay	Jiu-Jitsu	
Major Awardees	Ellise Xoe Malilay	Jiu-Jitsu	
Major Awardees	Angel Sanchez	Jiu-Jitsu	
Major Awardees	Jared Tan	Jiu-Jitsu	
Major Awardees	William John Riley Go	Karting	
Major Awardees	Margielyn Didal	Skateboarding	
Major Awardees	Aidaine Laxa	Taekwondo (Poomsae)	
Major Awardees	Matthew Hermosa	Triathlon	
Major Awardees	Elreen Ando	Weightlifting	
Major Awardees	Ronil Tubog	Wrestling	

142 athletes and teams will also be given special citations from the awards night.

== See also ==
- 2023 in Philippine sports
- 2024 PSA Annual Awards
- Philippines at the 2023 Southeast Asian Games
- Philippines at the 2024 Summer Olympics
