= Bornea =

Bornea is a surname. Notable people with the surname include:

- Dave Bornea (born 1995), Filipino YouTube personality, actor, model, and dancer
- Jade Bornea (born 1995), Filipino boxer
