= Wordtrans =

Wordtrans is an application to look up words in dictionaries. It is available under the GNU General Public License. It is written by Ricardo Villalba.

It supports dictionaries in plain text, DICT dictionaries and dictionaries from Babylon Translator.
