= Decisions in combat sports =

Combat sports results determined by judges

In combat sports, a decision is a result of the fight or bout that does not end in a knockout, submission or other finish, in which the (usually) three judges' scorecards are consulted to determine the winner; a majority of judges must agree on a result. The judges' result can either award a win, loss, or draw.

If no judges are in attendance for scoring and the fight reaches the time limit with no finish, the fight goes to no decision.

== Scoring ==
If a fight reaches the time limit with no finish, the outcome of fight is decided based on the judges' scorecards. In most professional boxing and mixed martial arts fights, there are three judges.

In a "ten-point system", a judge must award the fighter whom they judged as having "won the round" ten points, while the other fighter receives nine points or fewer. If a judge feels that there was no clear winner in a round, they must award both fighters ten points. This does not include point deductions from referees; rounds where neither fighter scores ten points can occur.

At the end of the bout, each judge will tally the scores to determine which fighter had won, if any, according to the judge's tally; a fighter that "won" a majority of rounds usually emerges with more points. If a fighter ends up with a higher number of points, that fighter "won" on that judge's scorecard. A fighter has to "win" on at least two scorecards to win the fight. If neither fighter "won" on at least two scorecards, the match is a draw; in championship fights, the champion usually retains the title in a draw, if not, it is "vacated" - the title belongs to no fighter and is vacant. The scores do not necessarily have to be identical in unanimous decisions.

== Summary ==
- In the table below, the bout is fought by fighters from the blue and red corners and no knockouts occurred.

Judges' scorecards winner			Scorecards tally			Decision	Fight result	Example
Judges' scorecards winner			Red	Blue	Draw	Decision	Fight result	Example
Red	Red	Red	3	0	0	Unanimous decision	Red corner wins	Mike Tyson vs. Tony Tucker
draw	Blue	Blue	0	2	1	Majority decision	Blue corner wins	Manny Pacquiao vs. Juan Manuel Márquez III
Blue	Red	Red	2	1	0	Split decision	Red corner wins	Oscar De La Hoya vs. Floyd Mayweather Jr.
Blue	Red	draw	1	1	1	Split draw	Tie (draw)	Evander Holyfield vs. Lennox Lewis
draw	draw	Red	1	0	2	Majority draw	Tie (draw)	Jean Pascal vs. Bernard Hopkins
draw	draw	draw	0	0	3	Unanimous draw	Tie (draw)	Chris John vs. Rocky Juarez I

== Other decisions ==
- Knockout (KO): It occurs when a fighter falls to the ground legally due to strikes, and does not answer the referee's count. A referee can immediately call a knockout without counting if they have determined strikes have rendered a fighter unconscious, and/or otherwise unable to respond to the count.
  - A technical knockout (TKO) occurs when the referee stops a fight because they have determined one of the fighters can no longer meaningfully defend themselves, or has sustained damage that renders them unable to meaningfully defend themselves.
- Technical decision: It happens when a fight has to be stopped because of a headbutt. If the fight has exceeded a certain number of rounds, the judges' scorecards can be used to determine a winner, as above.
  - Technical draw: It occurs when the judges' can not determine a winner when the fight goes to the scorecards due to a headbutt.
- No contest: It is used to describe a fight that ends for external reasons, which does not result in a win, a loss or a draw.
- Referee technical decision: It happens when, during any rest period between rounds, a boxer refuses to continue or their corner pulls them out, thereby forcing the referee to call an end to the fight.
- Disqualification: It happens when a bout is stopped short of knockout or judges' decision because, intentionally, one or both contestants have repeatedly flagrantly fouled an opponent or violated other rules. The disqualified boxer automatically loses the bout to the opponent.
  - In double disqualifications the result is usually declared a no contest regardless of round.
- Submission: It happens when a fighter gives in to the opponent. The fighter who gives in loses the fight.
  - A technical submission is ruled when the referee or doctor stops the fight because a fighter is unable to continue in combat. This usually happens if a submission move renders a fighter unconscious before they can submit, or if they suffer an injury due to a submission move.
