= 3rd Siklab Sports Youth Awards =

Award ceremony

- Date: December 4, 2023
- Location: Market! Market!, Bonifacio Global City, Taguig
- Country: Philippines

The 3rd Siklab Sports Youth Awards is an awarding ceremony that recognizes the young Philippine athletes aged 18 and below that stand out in different local, national and international competitions for the year 2023.

== Details ==
The awarding ceremony will be occur at the Market! Market!, Bonifacio Global City, Taguig on December 4, 2023. Senator Bong Go will serve as the guest of honor and one of the awardees.

This serves as a revival of the aforementioned sports award-giving body after it was shelved during the COVID-19 pandemic following the two straight editions conducted in 2018 and 2019.

The organizer, Philippine Sports Commission-Philippine Olympic Committee Media Group, an affiliate of the Philippine Sportswriters Association, is a group of sportswriters that cover the country's top sports governing bodies as well as more than 70 National Sports Associations and Team Philippines' campaign in international competitions such as the Olympics, Asian Games, Southeast Asian Games, Asian Para Games and ASEAN Para Games.

== Honor roll ==
=== Go For Gold Young Heroes ===
- Lucas Aguilar (Wrestling & Grappling)
- John Andre Aguja (MTB Cycling)
- Artegal Barrientos (Bowling)
- Bianca Bustamante (Motorsports)
- Miguel Archangel Cruz (Shooting)
- Kheith Rhynne Cruz (Table Tennis)
- Rex dela Cruz (Fencing)
- Prince Keil delos Santos (Weightlifting)
- Alex Eala (Tennis)
- Kira Ellis (Triathlon)
- Fitzchel Fermato (Kickboxing & Vovinam)
- Matthew Hermosa (Triathlon)
- Breanna Labadan (Gymnastics)
- Alexa Larrazabal (Fencing)
- Santino Luzuriaga (Jiu-Jitsu)
- Gennah Malapit (Athletics)
- Rianne Malixi (Golf)
- Kylie Mallari (Muaythai)
- Tachiana Mangin (Taekwondo)
- Charlie Manzano (Gymnastics)
- Andrea Sayson (Fencing)
- Ronel Suyom (Boxing)
- Karl Eldrew Yulo (Gymnastics)

=== Burlington Super Kids ===
- Lucho Aguilar (Wrestling)
- Erica Arnaiz (Softball)
- Joaquin Antonio Collo (Football)
- Bernardus Emmanuel Corpino (Motorsports)
- Trisha Mae del Rosario (Obstacle Course Racing)
- Alexander Gabriel delos Reyes (Wushu)
- Joseph Anthony Godbout (Modern Pentathlon)
- Peter Groseclose (Short Track Speed Skating)
- Hussein Loraña (Athletics)
- Ellise Xoe Malilay (Jiu-Jitsu)
- Sebastian Niel Mañalac (Karate)
- Justhene Navaluna (Cycling)
- Ella Olaso (Jiu-Jitsu)
- Khylem Progella (Volleyball)
- Jasmine Althea Ramilo (Gymnastics)
- Jan Brix Ramiscal (Muaythai)
- Kimberly Athena Sze (Ice Hockey)

=== Blue Hydra Rising Stars ===
- Aielle Aguilar (Jiu-Jitsu)
- Mazel Paris Alegado (Skateboarding)
- Christian Gian Karlo Arca (Chess)
- Mark Jay Bacojo (Chess)
- Miguel Carlos (Archery)
- Zhaoyu Capilitan (Chess)
- Miel Mckenzie Cipriano (Archery)
- Marc Dominic Collantes (Archery)
- Julian de Kam (Swimming)
- Ayona Huerto (Rowing)
- Maritanya Krog (Cycling)
- Yanna Marte (Jiu-Jitsu)
- Princess Reuma (Jiu-Jitsu)
- Jodie Danielle Tan (Fencing)
- Mico Villaran (Athletics)

=== Special Citations ===
- Davao Aguilas F.C. (Football)
- Youth Football League (Football)
  - Represented by Quezon City 1st District Representative Arjo Atayde and Mike Atayde
- Artegal Barrientos, Marc Dylan Custodio, Stephen Luke Diwa, Zach Ramin (Bowling)

=== Other Awards ===
- Ernest Obiena (Athletics) - Sports Idol Awardee
- Ariel Alegarbes (Swimming) - Para Youth Star Awardee
- Angel Otom (Swimming) - Para Youth Star Awardee
- Bong Go - Sports Godfather of the Year Awardee

== See also ==
- 2023 in Philippine sports
- 2024 PSA Annual Awards
- PSA Athlete of the Year
