= 2022 in Philippine sports =

The following is a list of notable events and developments that are related to Philippine sports in 2022.

== Events ==
=== Athletics ===
- March 30 – Ernest John Obiena–PATAFA dispute: the Philippine Sports Commission announces that the Philippine Athletics Track and Field Association (PATAFA) would continue to endorse pole vaulter Ernest John Obiena's participation in international tournaments, including the 2021 Southeast Asian Games and the 2022 World Athletics Championships, following a resolution to the dispute reached between PATAFA and Obiena.
- July 24 – Ernest John Obiena becomes the first Filipino medalist at the World Athletics Championships after winning the bronze medal at the men's pole vault event of the 2022 championships in Eugene, Oregon, United States. He cleared the 5.94-meter mark, breaking both his personal record and the Asian record of 5.93 meters.
- August 17 – Ernest John Obiena–PATAFA dispute: PATAFA reinstates pole vaulter Ernest John Obiena into the Philippines national athletics team following the dispute.
- September 2 – Ernest John Obiena wins the pole vault event at the 2022 Memorial Van Damme in Brussels, Belgium, which is part of the 2022 Diamond League, after clearing the 5.91-meter mark.

=== Basketball ===
- January 6 – The Philippine Basketball Association postpones the 2021 Governors' Cup due to the COVID-19 pandemic.
- January 14 – The Games and Amusement Board (GAB) bars the Filipino Basketball League (FilBasket) from holding future tournaments without the board's permission.
- February 16 – The Alaska Aces announce their retirement from Philippine Basketball Association after 35 years of team franchise.
- March 1 – Filbasket is granted professional status by the GAB.
- March 18 – The inaugural season of the Pilipinas Super League opens in Zamboanga del Norte.
- April 10 – The CPG Bohol Dolphins claims the Pilipinas VisMin Super Cup title after defeating the OCCCI-Ormoc Sheer Masters 2–0 in a best-of-three series.
- April 22 – Barangay Ginebra San Miguel retains the 2021 PBA Governors' Cup title after defeating the Meralco Bolts 4–2 in a best-of-seven series.
- May 13 – The UP Fighting Maroons claim the UAAP Season 84 men's basketball tournament title after defeating the three-time defending champions, the Ateneo Blue Eagles, in the decisive third game of a three-game series, 72–69, in overtime. This was their first men's basketball championship title in 36 years.
- May 22:
  - The Letran Knights claim the NCAA season 97 men's basketball tournament title after defeating the Mapúa Cardinals 2–0 in a best-of-three series.
  - The Philippines men's national basketball team ends their 33-year gold medal streak in basketball at the Southeast Asian Games after losing to Indonesia 81–85 in the 2021 tournament final in Hanoi, Vietnam.
- June 19 – The Philippines men's national under-17 basketball team finishes their 2022 FIBA U16 Asian Championship campaign in 7th place after defeating Iran 95–87.
- July 10 – The Philippines men's national 3x3 team finishes their 2022 FIBA 3x3 Asia Cup campaign in 4th place after being defeated by China, 18–20.
- July 19 – The Philippines men's national basketball team ends their 2022 FIBA Asia Cup campaign after being defeated by Japan, 81–102, in the quarterfinal playoff.
- August 11 – The Ateneo Blue Eagles claim the inaugural World University Basketball Series in Tokyo, Japan, after defeating three universities from Asia in a single round robin.
- August 28 – The Philippines men's national under-19 basketball team ends their 2022 FIBA U18 Asian Championship campaign at sixth place after being defeated by the hosts, Iran, 72–89, in the fifth-place playoff.
- September 4 – The San Miguel Beermen claim the 2022 PBA Philippine Cup title after defeating TNT Tropang Giga 4–3 in a do-or-die seven-game series.
- October 10 – Kyt Jimenez of Sarangani Marlins completes a quadruple-double statistics against Mindoro Tams at 33 points, 13 rebounds, 11 assists, and 11 steals at Paco Arena, Manila, becoming the first player to do so in the Maharlika Pilipinas Basketball League.
- December 11 – The NU Lady Bulldogs wins UAAP Season 85 women's basketball after defeating the De La Salle Lady Archers 2–0 in a best-of-three-game series. This was their seventh consecutive title.
- December 12 – The Nueva Ecija Rice Vanguards wins 2022 MPBL finals title after defeating Zamboanga Family's Brand Sardines 3–1 in a best-of-five-game series.
- December 18 – The Letran Knights wins NCAA Season 98 basketball tournaments championship title after defeating CSB Blazers 2–1 in a do-or-die three-game series. This was their third consecutive championship title.
- December 19 – The Ateneo Blue Eagles wins UAAP Season 85 basketball tournaments championship title after defeating the defending champions UP Fighting Maroons 2–1 in a do-or-die three-game series.

=== Bowling ===
- November 10 – Paeng Nepomuceno wins the men's singles 65 and above category in the 16th Asian Senior Bowling Championships in Petaling Jaya, Malaysia, having scored a total of 1,264 pinfalls over the 1,238 pinfalls of Japan's Akira Nakada.

=== Boxing ===
- January 14 – Jade Bornea defeats Morocco's Mohammed Obbadi via a knockout in the third round to retain the IBF junior bantamweight title at the Auditorio Jacales in Monterrey, Mexico.
- January 22 – Mark Magsayo claims the WBC featherweight title after defeating Gary Russell Jr. via majority decision at Borgata in Atlantic City, New Jersey, United States.
- February 27:
  - Jerwin Ancajas loses the IBF super flyweight title to Argentina's Fernando Martinez via unanimous decision.
  - Vincent Astrolabio claims the vacant WBC bantamweight title after defeating Cuba's Guillermo Rigondeaux via unanimous decision.
- April 10 – Eumir Marcial defeats Isiah Hart via technical knockout in the fourth round, remaining undefeated as a professional boxer.
- May 4 – The World Boxing Organization (WBO) strips John Riel Casimero off his world bantamweight championship title that he gained in 2019 due to unforeseen issues regarding the organization's bantamweight ranking.
- June 7 – Nonito Donaire loses to Naoya Inoue via technical knockout on the second round of their rematch.
- June 26 – Mark Anthony Barriga loses the WBO flyweight title after being defeated by Puerto Rico's Jonathan González via unanimous decision.
- July 10 – Mark Magsayo loses the WBC featherweight title after being defeated by Mexico's Rey Vargas via split decision.
- July 13 – Donnie Nietes loses WBO super flyweight title after being defeated by Japan's Kazuto Ioka via unanimous decision.
- July 30 – Dave Apolinario claims the IBO flyweight title after defeating Gideon Buthelezi via knockout on the first round.
- October 9:
  - Jerwin Ancajas fails to reclaim the IBF super flyweight title to Argentina's Fernando Martinez via unanimous decision.
  - Eumir Marcial defeats Steven Pichardo via unanimous decision, remaining undefeated as a professional boxer.
- October 24 – Jayr Raquinel claims the vacant WBO Intercontinental super flyweight title after defeating Landi Ngxeke via a technical knockout on the second round.
- November 12 – Carlo Paalam claims the gold medal for the men's bantamweight category at the ASBC Asian Elite Boxing Championships in Amman, Jordan, after defeating Kazakhstan's Makhmud Sabyrkhan via a split decision, 4–1, in the finals.
- December 21 – The Korean Boxing Member Commission overruled the decision of Johnriel Casimiro has been declared winner by knockout against Ryo Akaho in second round from no contest.

=== Cue sports ===
- August 28 – Chezka Centeno claims the inaugural Asian Pool Federation's Nine-ball Championship title after defeating Seo Seoa in the final, 11–7.
- September 11 – The Philippines team, consisting of Rubilen Amit, Carlo Biado, and Johann Chua, win the 2022 Predator World 10-ball Team Championship in Klagenfurt, Austria, after defeating Great Britain's Darren Appleton, Kelly Fisher, and Jayson Shaw, in both the singles and mixed double events.

=== Cycle sports ===
- August 24–28 – Mountain biker Ariana Evangelista competes in the 2022 UCI Mountain Bike World Championships in Les Gets, France, becoming the first Filipino woman cyclist to join the event.

=== Football ===
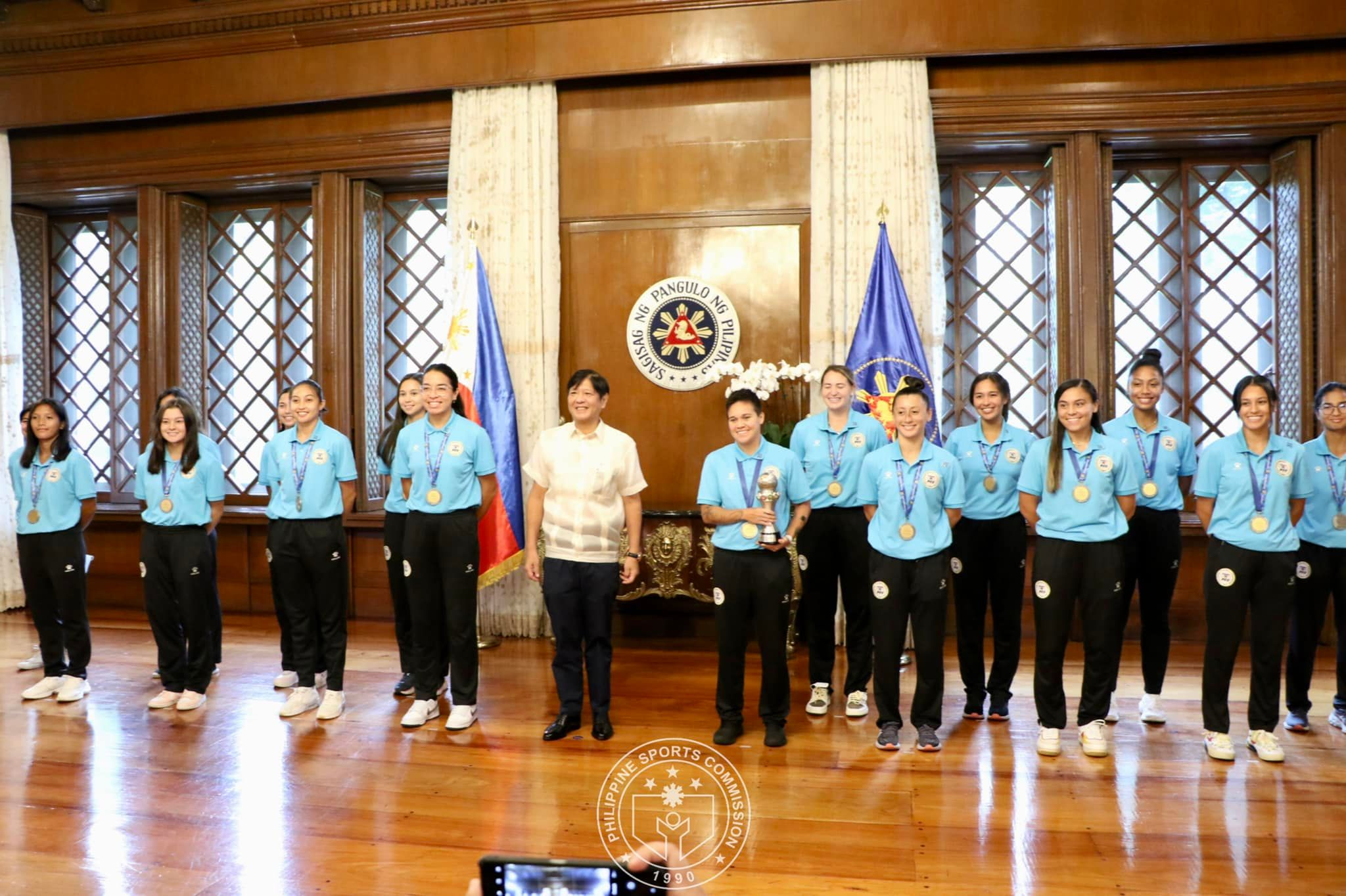
The Philippines women's football team pay a courtesy visit to President Bongbong Marcos at Malacañang Palace following their victory at the 2022 AFF Women's Championship.

- January 31 – The Philippines women's national football team qualify for the 2023 FIFA Women's World Cup after defeating Chinese Taipei 4–3 on penalties following a 1–1 draw in the quarterfinals of the 2022 AFC Women's Asian Cup in Pune, India. It is the first time that the Philippine women's football team qualify for a FIFA Women's World Cup tournament.
- May 21 – The Philippines women's national football team finishes with a bronze medal at the 2021 Southeast Asian Games women's football tournament in Cẩm Phả, Vietnam, after defeating the Myanmar women's national football team 2–1. This was the team's first podium finish in women's football since the 1985 Southeast Asian Games.
- May 22 – United City F.C. claims the 2022 Copa Paulino Alcantara title after defeating the defending champion Kaya F.C.–Iloilo at a score of 3–2.
- June 4 – Negros Occidental F.A. claims the 2022 PFF U-19 Boys National Football Championship after defeating National Capital Region F.A. 1–0 in extra time.
- July 17 – The Philippines women's national football team win the 2022 AFF Women's Championship after defeating Thailand 3–0 in the final at home soil to secure their first major championship title.
- October 21 – The Kaya F.C. women's team claim the 2022 SingaCup's Women's Football Championship after defeating three other Southeast Asian clubs in a round-robin format.

=== Gymnastics ===
- November 6 – Carlos Yulo wins silver and bronze medals at the vault and parallel bars events, respectively, at the 2022 World Artistic Gymnastics Championships in Liverpool, United Kingdom.

=== Jiu-Jitsu ===
- November 4 – Kimberly Custodio and Meggie Ochoa win the gold medal at the women's 45 kg and 48 kg events, respectively, at the JJIF Jiu-Jitsu World Championship in Abu Dhabi, UAE.
- November 11 – A 5-year old named Aleia Aielle Aguilar claims a gold medal at kids' 1 under-16 kg. category after defeating Gabriela Vercosa of Brazil at the JJIF Jiu-Jitsu World Championship, becoming the youngest Filipino world champion.

=== Karate ===
- July 9 – Junna Tsukii wins the gold medal at the women's kumite 50 kg event at the 2022 World Games in Birmingham, United States, after defeating Venezuela's Yorgelis Salazar 2–0.

=== Mixed martial arts ===
- December 3 – The ONE 164 is held at the Mall of Asia Arena in Pasay with Joshua Pacio losing his ONE Strawweight Championship against Jarred Brooks via a unanimous decision.

=== Motorsport ===
- March 22 – Bianca Bustamante becomes the first Filipino racing driver to compete in the W Series motor racing championship after she was selected to compete in its 2022 season.

=== Softball ===
- September 6 – The Philippines men's national softball team finish as runners-up of the 2022 Asian Men's Softball Championship in Kōchi, Japan, after losing to the hosts and eventual champions, Japan, in their final game. The team also qualify for the 2022 Men's Softball World Cup in Auckland, New Zealand, in November.

=== Tennis ===
- April 10 – Alex Eala wins her second professional title after defeating Thailand's Luksika Kumkhum in two sets, 6–4, 6–2, at the W25 tournament of the 2022 International Tennis Federation Women's World Tennis Tour in Chiang Rai, Thailand.
- September 10 – Alex Eala wins the girls' singles title of the 2022 US Open in New York City to become the first Filipino player to win a junior Grand Slam singles title, after defeating Lucie Havlíčková of the Czech Republic in two sets, 6–2, 6–4.

=== Volleyball ===
- April 8 – The Creamline Cool Smashers claim the 2022 Premier Volleyball League Open Conference title after defeating the Petro Gazz Angels 2–0 in a best-of-three series.
- June 14–19 – The Philippines co-hosts the 2022 FIVB Volleyball Women's Nations League preliminary rounds at the Mall of Asia Arena in Pasay.
- June 21 – The NU Lady Bulldogs claim the UAAP Season 84 women's volleyball title after defeating the De La Salle Lady Archers 2–0 in a best-of-three series. This was their first championship title in women's volleyball in 65 years.
- June 21–26 – The Philippines co-hosts the 2022 FIVB Volleyball Men's Nations League preliminary rounds at the Araneta Coliseum in Quezon City.
- August 14 – The Creamline Cool Smashers claim 2022 Premier Volleyball League Invitational Conference title after defeating guest team KingWhale Taipei in three sets, 25–21, 25–19, 25–8.
- August 21–29 – The Philippines hosts the 2022 Asian Women's Volleyball Cup at the PhilSports Arena in Pasig. It is the first time that the country hosts an Asian Women's Volleyball Cup tournament.
- August 28 – The Philippines women's national volleyball team records its best finish at the Asian Women's Volleyball Cup after defeating Australia in three sets to two at the semifinals of the 5th–8th place repechage.
- October 1 – The NU-Sta. Elena Nationals claim the 2022 Spikers' Turf Open Conference after defeating Cignal HD Spikers 2–0 in a best-of-three series.
- December 6 – The Petro Gazz Angels retains 2022 Premier Volleyball League Reinforced Conference title after defeating Cignal HD Spikers 2–0 in a best-of-three-game series.

=== Weightlifting ===
- July 17 – Angeline Colonia wins two gold medals in the women's 40 kg category at 2022 Asian Youth and Junior Championships in Tashkent, Uzbekistan.
- December 8 – Hidilyn Diaz claims three gold medals in the women's 55 kg category at 2022 World Weightlifting Championships in Bogota, Colombia.

=== Multi-sport events ===
- May 22 – The 656-strong Philippine delegation finishes their 2021 Southeast Asian Games campaign in 4th place overall after winning 52 gold, 70 silver, and 105 bronze medals.
- August 6 – The 144-strong Philippine delegation finishes their 2022 ASEAN Para Games campaign in 5th place overall after winning 28 gold, 30 silver, and 46 bronze medals.

=== Other collegiate events ===
- May 22 – The FEU Cheering Squad wins the UAAP Season 84 Cheerdance Competition. This was their very first cheerdance championship title.
- June 21 – The UST Growling Tigers wins the UAAP Season 84 overall title.
- December 10 – The NU Pep Squad reclaims the UAAP Season 85 Cheerdance Competition.

=== Other events ===
- August 30 – President Bongbong Marcos appoints former Philippine Basketball Association commissioner Noli Eala to be the 11th chairperson of the Philippine Sports Commission (PSC).
- December 28 – Malacañang confirms the appointment of Richard Bachmann, former University Athletic Association of the Philippines commissioner, as chairperson of the PSC, replacing Eala.

== Deaths ==
- January 2 – Rudy Fernandez (b. 1949), triathlete
- January 14 – Maoi Roca (b. 1975), basketball player
- January 30 – Valerio Lopez (b. 1926), former basketball player and coach
- February 9 – Johanna Uy (b. 1980), underwater hockey player
- April 15 – Eric Suguitan (b. 1985), former basketball player
- April 16 – Boyet Sison (b. 1963), TV host and sports personality
- August 10:
  - Lydia de Vega (b. 1964), sprinter
  - Dong Polistico (b. 1967), former basketball player

== See also ==
- 2022 in the Philippines
- 2022 in sports
