= 2024 PSA Annual Awards =

Annual athletic award

- Date: January 29, 2024
- Location: Diamond Hotel, Manila
- Country: Philippines
- Hosted by: Quinito Henson; Denise Tan; Bea Escudero; Carlo Pamintuan

Television/radio coverage
- Network: Cignal TV; Pilipinas Live; Radyo Pilipinas 2 Sports

The 2024 San Miguel Corporation (SMC)-Philippine Sportswriters Association (PSA) Annual Awards Night was an annual awarding ceremony honoring the individuals (athletes, officials) teams and organizations that had made significant contributions to the continuous growth of Philippine sports in 2023.

== Details ==
The awarding ceremony was held on January 29, 2024, at the Diamond Ballroom of the Diamond Hotel in Manila.

A total of 140 personalities and groups spearheaded by EJ Obiena as the Athlete of the Year were given out the most awards in this year's edition of the country's top sports award-giving body, which coincides the 75th anniversary of the Philippine Sportswriters Association.

Philippine Sports Commission Chairman Richard Bachmann, Philippine Olympic Committee President Abraham Tolentino and other Philippine sports officials were attended the affair.

Prior to the announcement, Team Philippines' gold medalists from the 2022 Asian Games, Obiena (Athletics), Meggie Ochoa and Annie Ramirez (Jiu-Jitsu), and the Philippines men's national basketball team (Gilas Pilipinas) and the Philippines women's national football team (Filipinas) who have been played in their maiden appearance at the 2023 FIFA Women's World Cup are among the candidates for the Athlete of the Year of 2023 by the PSA.

The PSA, currently headed by its president, Nelson Beltran, sports editor of The Philippine Star, is the oldest Philippine-based media group established in 1948 and the membership is composed of sportswriters, sports reporters, sports editors, and columnists from the Philippines-based broadsheets, tabloids, online sports websites, and broadcast media.

== Honor roll ==
=== Main awards ===
The following are the list of main awards of the event.

==== Athlete of the Year ====
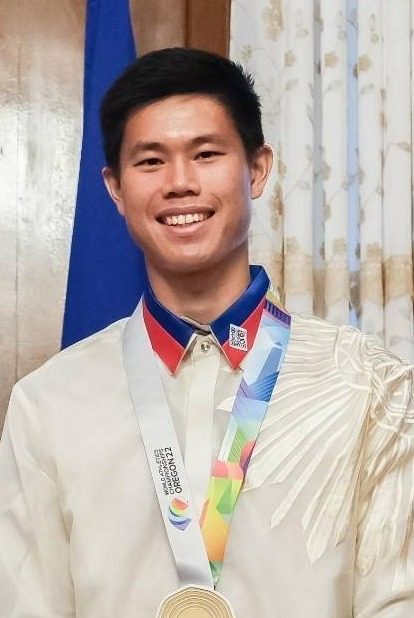
EJ Obiena named as the Athlete of the Year of the PSA for 2023.

Pole vaulter Ernest John "EJ" Obiena was the majority choice of the PSA for the Athlete of the Year for 2023 due to his successful accomplishments in that year including the gold medal finishes in the 2023 SEA Games in Cambodia, 2023 Asian Athletics Championships in Thailand and 2022 Asian Games in China and silver medal rout in the 2023 World Athletics Championships in Hungary, setting new competition, Philippine and Asian records, making it into the 6-meter club and his current placing as the World #2 Pole Vaulter.

Obiena bested Ramirez, Ochoa, the Gilas Pilipinas and the Filipinas teams for the recognition. He is also the first track & field athlete since 2009 (courtesy of Marestella Torres of Long Jump) to be bestowed for the major award.

Obiena did not attend the ceremony but he did join via Zoom, while his parents Emerson and Jeanette received the award on his behalf.

Award	Winner	Sport	References
Athlete of the Year	EJ Obiena	Athletics (Pole Vault)	

==== Main awardees ====
Award	Winner	Sport/Team/Recognition	References
President's Award	Gilas Pilipinas (Philippines men's national basketball team)	Basketball (2022 Asian Games gold medalist, Men's 5x5 Basketball)	
Lifetime Achievement Award	Allan Caidic; Samboy Lim; Joe Lipa; Dante Silverio; Turo Valenzona	Basketball (Philippine basketball's legendary players and coaches)	
National Sports Association of the Year	Samahang Basketbol ng Pilipinas (SBP) and Jiu-Jitsu Federation of the Philippines (JJFP)	Basketball and Jiu-Jitsu (Responsible for winning 3 out of 4 gold medals in the 2022 Asian Games)	
Executive of the Year	Ramon Ang and Manny Pangilinan	Basketball (Main backers of Samahang Basketbol ng Pilipinas, 2023 FIBA Basketball World Cup and the Gilas Pilipinas program)	
Mr. Basketball	June Mar Fajardo	Basketball (2022-2023 PBA season Most Valuable Player (San Miguel Beermen) and Gilas Pilipinas center - won golds in SEA Games and Asian Games and played in the 2023 FIBA Basketball World Cup)	
Ms. Football	Sarina Bolden	Football (Filipinas (Philippines women's national football team) forward and goal scorer in the 2023 FIFA Women's World Cup)	
Ms. Tennis	Alex Eala	Tennis (Won two ITF circuit titles and two Asian Games bronze medals in Women's Singles and Mixed Doubles)	
Ms. Volleyball	Tots Carlos	Volleyball (2023 Premier Volleyball League First All-Filipino Conference Champion for Creamline Cool Smashers and Most Valuable Player and Second All-Filipino Conference Champion for Creamline)	
Special Award "Golden Lady Booters"	Filipinas (Philippines women's national football team)	Football (Made historic first appearance at the 2023 FIFA Women's World Cup)	
Milo Philippines Gold, Grit and Glory Award	EJ Obiena	Athletics (World-Ranked #2 pole vaulter and 2022 Asian Games gold medalist)	

==== Major awardees ====
Sorted by alphabetical order and based by surname.

Winner	Sport/Team/Recognition	References
James Aranas	Billiards (Champion, 2023 World Cup of Pool)	
Big Lagoon; Owner and Breeder: Melaine Habla; Trainer: Ruben Tupas; Jockey: John Alvin Guce; Sire/Dam: Havana - Blue Catch	Horse racing (Horse of the Year) (Champion, 2023 Philippine Charity Sweepstakes Office (PCSO) - Philippine Racing Commission (PHILRACOM) Presidential Gold Cup)	
Chezka Centeno	Billiards (Champion, 2023 WPA World 10-Ball Women’s Championship)	
Johann Chua	Billiards (Champion, 2023 World Cup of Pool)	
John Alvin Guce	Horse racing (Jockey of the Year) (Regular rider of Presidential Golf Cup champion Big Lagoon)	
Leonardo "Sandy" Javier Jr.	Horse racing (Horse Owner of the Year) (Vice Governor of Leyte and well-known and established horse owner)	
Meggie Ochoa	Jiu-jitsu (2022 Asian Games gold medalist, Women's 48 kg)	
Zach Ramin	Bowling (Champion, 2023 Singapore International Open)	
Annie Ramirez	Jiu-jitsu (2023 Southeast Asian Games and 2022 Asian Games gold medalist, Women's 57 kg)	
Miguel Tabuena	Golf (Champion, 2023 Asian Tour DGC Open)	
Carlos Yulo	Gymnastics (2023 Southeast Asian Games and 2023 Asian Artistic Gymnastics Championships multiple gold medalist)	

==== Recognitions ====
The PSA will give recognition awards to the gold medalists of four major international competitions that Team Philippines joined this year.

===== 2023 Southeast Asian Games gold medalists =====
The Philippine delegation finished in 5th place with 58 golds, 85 silver and 115 bronze medals in the 2023 Southeast Asian Games which was held from 5 to 16 May 2023 in Phnom Penh, Cambodia.

- Arven Alcantara (Taekwondo)
- Francis Alcantara and Ruben Gonzales (Tennis)
- Ella Alcoseba (Arnis)
- Sakura Alforte (Karate)
- Kirstie Alora (Taekwondo)
- Elreen Ando (Weightlifting)
- Joseph Arcilla (Soft Tennis)
- Jason Balabal (Wrestling)
- Kurt Barbosa (Taekwondo)
- Paul Bascon (Boxing)
- Ian Clark Bautista (Boxing)
- Miguel Besana (Gymnastics)
- Dexler Bolambao (Arnis)
- Precious Cabuya (Obstacle Course Racing)
- Xiandi Chua (Swimming)
- Fer Casares (Triathlon)
- Robin Catalan (Kun Bokator)
- Princess Catindig and Bien Zoleta-Mañalac (Soft Tennis)
- Eric Cray (Athletics)
- John Ivan Cruz (Gymnastics)
- Gretel de Paz (Kickboxing)
- Crisamuel Delfin (Arnis)
- Angel Derla (Kun Bokator)
- Rena Furukawa (Judo)
- Jamie Lim (Karate)
- Marc Lim (Jiu-Jitsu)
- Alvin Lobreguito (Wrestling)
- Trixie Lofranco (Arnis)
- Kim Mangrobang (Triathlon)
- Samuel Morrison (Taekwondo)
- Kaila Napolis (Jiu-Jitsu)
- EJ Obiena (Athletics)
- Carlo Paalam (Boxing)
- Patrick King Perez (Taekwondo)
- Nesthy Petecio (Boxing)
- Annie Ramirez (Jiu-Jitsu)
- Mark Julius Rodelas (Obstacle Course Racing)
- Jean Claude Saclag (Kickboxing)
- Teia Salvino (Swimming)
- Vanessa Sarno (Weightlifting)
- Jedah Soriano (Arnis)
- Charlotte Tolentino (Arnis)
- Ronil Tubog (Wrestling)
- Janry Ubas (Athletics)
- Claudine Veloso (Kickboxing)
- Cristina Vergara (Wrestling)
- Agatha Wong (Wushu)
- Carlos Yulo (Gymnastics)
- Philippine Aquathlon Team (Mixed)
  - Erika Burgos, Kira Ellis, Matthew Hermosa, Inaki Lorbes
- Philippine Athletics Team (Men's 4 x 400 meter relay)
  - Michael del Prado, Frederick Ramirez, Joyme Sequita, Umajesty Williams
- Philippine Basketball Team - Men's: Gilas Pilipinas
  - Mason Amos, Justin Brownlee, Marcio Lassiter, Jerom Lastimosa, Chris Newsome, Calvin Oftana, CJ Perez, Michael Phillips, Chris Ross, Brandon Ganuelas-Rosser, Christian Standhardinger, Arvin Tolentino
- Philippine ESports Team
  - Reniel "Dr4w" Angara, Aaron Mark "Aaron" Bingay, Golden Hart "DemonKite" Dajao, Gerald Gianne "Tgee" Gelacio, Chammy Paul "Chammy" Nazarrea, Justine Ritchie "Juschie" Tan (League of Legends: Wild Rift)
  - Angelo Kyle "Pheww" Arcangel, David "FlapTzy" Canon, Nowee "Ryota" Macasa, Marco "Super Marco" Requitano, Kyle "KyleTzy" Sayson, Rowgien "Owgwen" Unigo (Mobile Legends: Bang Bang)
- Philippine Obstacle Course Racing Team
  - Jay-R de Castro, Mervin Guarte, Ahgie Radan, Elias Tabac (Men's Team Relay)
  - Sandi Menchi Abahan, Mecca Cortizano, Tess Nocyao, Mhik Tejares (Women's Team Relay)
- Philippine Soft Tennis Team (Women's)
  - Fatima Amirul, Virvien Bejosano, Princess Catindig, Bien Zoleta-Mañalac, Christy Sañosa, Bambi Zoleta
- Philippine Taekwondo Team (Women's Recognized Poomsae)
  - Nicole Labayne, Aidaine Laxa, Jocel Lyn Ninobla

===== 2023 ASEAN Para Games gold medalists =====
The Philippine delegation finished in 5th place with 34 golds, 33 silver and 50 bronze medals in the 2023 ASEAN Para Games which was held from 3 to 9 June 2023 in Phnom Penh, Cambodia.

- Ariel Alegarbes (Swimming)
- Cendy Asusano (Athletics)
- Gary Bejino (Swimming)
- Darry Bernardo (Chess)
- Evaristo Carbonel (Athletics)
- Ernie Gawilan (Swimming)
- Andrei Kuizon (Athletics)
- Jerrold Mangliwan (Athletics)
- Cheyzer Mendoza (Chess)
- Angel Otom (Swimming)
- Marydol Pamati-an (Powerlifting)
- King James Reyes (Athletics)
- Sander Severino (Chess)
- Rosalie Torrefiel (Athletics)
- Philippine Para Chess Team
  - Felix Aguilera, Henry Roger Lopez, Sander Severino (Men's PI)
  - Darry Bernardo, Israel Peligro, Menandro Redor, Arman Subaste (Men's VI-B2/B3)
  - Cheryl Angot, Fe Mangayayam, Cheyzer Mendoza, Jean Lee Nacita (Women's PI)

===== 2022 Asian Games gold medalists =====
The Philippine delegation finished in 17th place with 4 golds, 2 silver and 12 bronze medals in the 2022 Asian Games which was held from 23 September to 8 October 2023 in Hangzhou, China.

- EJ Obiena (Athletics)
- Meggie Ochoa (Jiu-Jitsu)
- Annie Ramirez (Jiu-Jitsu)
- Philippine Basketball Team - Men's: Gilas Pilipinas
  - Japeth Aguilar, Kevin Alas, Justin Brownlee, June Mar Fajardo, Ange Kouame, Marcio Lassiter, Chris Newsome, Calvin Oftana, CJ Perez, Chris Ross, Scottie Thompson, Arvin Tolentino

===== 2022 Asian Para Games gold medalists =====
The Philippine delegation finished in 9th place with 10 golds, 4 silver and 5 bronze medals in the 2022 Asian Para Games which was held from 22 to 28 October 2023 in Hangzhou, China.

- Darry Bernardo (Chess)
- Ernie Gawilan (Swimming)
- Henry Roger Lopez (Chess)
- Jerrold Mangliwan (Athletics)
- Cheyzer Mendoza (Chess)
- Menandro Redor (Chess)
- Philippine Para Chess Team
  - Darry Bernardo, Menandro Redor, Arman Subaste (VI-B2/B3)
  - Henry Roger Lopez, Jasper Rom, Sander Severino (PI)

==== Citations ====
The following are the athletes and team who will give special citations for their outstanding achievements in sports.

Winner	Sport/Team/Recognition	References
AP Bren; Angelo Kyle "Pheww" Arcangel, David "FlapTzy" Canon, Marco "Super Marco" Requitano, Kyle "KyleTzy" Sayson, Rowgien "Owgwen" Unigo, Vincent Joseph "Pandora" Unigo	Esports (Mobile Legends: Bang Bang) (Champion, MLBB M5 World Championship)	
Efren Bagamasbad	Chess (Champion, 12th Asian Senior Chess Championship)	
Bago City Girls Softball Team; Erica Arnaiz, Daniela Bejos, Ann Dyana Buenafe, Christine Jane Caracas, Thereze Francine Fuentes, Nice Lobrido, Froline Manalo, Ashley Ortiz, Audrie Sarsona, Marie Antoinette Sicapore, Casandra Sumatra, Icelle Tanaman	Softball (Champion, 2023 Junior League Softball World Series)	
Bianca Bustamante	Motorsports (First Filipina driver to take part in the F1 Academy and McLaren Development Program)	
Creamline Cool Smashers; Kyla Atienza, Lorie Bernardo, Theo Bonafe, Fille Cayetano, Tots Carlos, Celine Domingo, Ella de Jesus, Jema Galanza, Maria Fe Galanza, Michele Gumabao, Rizza Mandapat, Jia Morado-de Guzman, Kyle Negrito, Jeanette Panaga, Bernadeth Pons, Pau Soriano, Risa Sato, Alyssa Valdez, Rosemarie Vargas	Volleyball (Champions, 2023 PVL First and Second All-Filipino Conferences)	
Kaila Napolis	Jiu-Jitsu (2023 World Combat Games gold medalist, Women's -52 kg)	
Veronica Ompod	Powerlifting (Gold Medalist and World Record Holder, 2023 Asian Women's Classic Powerlifting Championships)	
Kevin "Popoy" Pascua	Obstacle Course Racing (Gold Medalist, 2023 OCR World Championships)	
Philippine Bowling Team; Artegal Barrientos, Marc Custodio, Stephen Diwa and Zach Ramin	Bowling (Overall champions and 2 gold medals, 21st Asian Youth Tenpin Bowling Championships)	
Standard Insurance Centennial V Ernesto Echauz, Ridgely Balladares, Rubin Cruz, Richly Magasanay, Stephen Tan, Bernard Floren, Joel Butch Mejarito, Whok Dimapilis, Harry Kim Lumapas, Emanuel Amadeo, Miguel Magsanay, Franco Hilario, Louie Perfectua, Elmer Cruz, Nazer Domingo, Jeanson Lumapas, Alaiza Belmonte, Paula Bombeo, Ricky Domingo, Jericho Marbella	Sailing (Line Honors, 2023 Rolex China Sea Race)	
Team Manila Softball Team; Mary Joy Alpitche, Mary Jane Beronilla, Angelica Cordero, Katherine Ditchon, Mary Jane Libaton, Anne Rose Macatbag, Kyle Marie Matarong, Anne Patricio, Rhea May Quilongquilong, Jhaycel Roldan, Sathia Nicole Romero-Salas, Kenchie Tan	Softball (Champion, 2023 Pony International World Series)	
Darius Venerable	Taekwondo (2023 World Combat Games gold medalist, Men's Poomsae)	
Rhichein Yosorez and Kylie Mallari	Muay Thai (2023 World Combat Games gold medalist, Mixed Mai Muay)	

==== Milo Philippines - Tony Siddayao Awards for Junior Athletes ====
The award, which is named after Tony Siddayao (deceased, former sports editor of Manila Standard) and sponsored by Milo Philippines is given out to outstanding junior national athletes aged 18 and below.

Winner	Sport/Team/Recognition	References
Aleia Aielle Aguilar	Jiu-Jitsu (Champion, 2023 Abu Dhabi World Jiu-Jitsu Festival Championships)	
Christian Gian Karlo Arca	Chess (Champion, Blitz, FIDE World Youth Chess Championship)	
Eron Borres	Weightlifting (Multiple Medalist, 2023 IWF World Youth Championships)	
Angeline Colonia	Weightlifting (Silver Medalist, 2023 SEA Games and Gold Medalist, 2023 Asian Youth and Junior Weightlifting Championships)	
Trisha Mae del Rosario	Obstacle Course Racing (Gold and Silver Medalist, 2023 Ninja World Cup Southeast Asia)	
Prince Keil delos Santos	Weightlifting (Multiple Medalist, 2023 IWF World Youth Championships)	
Althea Gaccion	Golf (Runner-up, Faldo Series European Grand Finals for Girls 16-under)	
Joseph Anthony Godbout	Modern Pentathon (2 Gold Medals, 2023 Southeast Asia Championships)	
Sebastien Niel Mañalac	Karate (Gold Medalist, 2nd Shureido International Karate Cup)	
Tachiana Kezhia Mangin	Taekwondo (Gold Medalist, 2023 ASEAN Taekwondo Championships and Silver Medalist, 2023 Chuncheon Korea Open International Taekwondo Championships)	
Jan Brix Ramiscal	Muay Thai (Gold Medalist, 2023 IFMA Youth World Championships)	
Karl Eldrew Yulo	Gymnastics (7 Gold Medals, 2023 Batang Pinoy National Championships)	

==== Posthumous Honors for Deceased Sports Personalities ====
During the awards program, the organization will offer a special tribute and remembrance to the sports personalities who died in 2023 through a one minute of silent prayer.

- Tisha Abundo (Volleyball)
- Charles Dave Dela Pena (e-Sports)
- Kenneth Egano (Boxing)
- Rudy Entertina (Basketball)
- Emmanuel Gacho (e-Sports)
- Ray Butch Gamboa (Motoring)
- Rey Gamboa (Basketball)
- Antonio Genato (Basketball)
- Nap Gutierrez (Sportswriting)
- Fernando Libed (Basketball)
- Samboy Lim (Basketball)
- Rob Luna (e-Sports)
- Ricky Mariano (Basketball)
- Ed Picson (Boxing / Sportscasting)
- Molet Pineda (Basketball)
- Terry Saldaña (Basketball)
- Yoyo Sangare (Football)
- Estanislao Terrones (Softball)
- Rodolfo Tingzon (Baseball)
- Ato Tolentino (Basketball)
- Boybits Victoria (Basketball)

== See also ==
- 2023 in Philippine sports
- 3rd Siklab Sports Youth Awards
