= Lê Thị Thanh Liên =

Vietnamese volleyball player (born 1993)

Personal information
- Full name: Lê Thị Thanh Liên
- Nationality: Vietnam
- Born: July 4, 1993 (age 33); Nghệ An, Vietnam
- Height: 1.53 m (5 ft 0 in)
- Weight: 46 kg (101 lb)
- Spike: 225 cm (7 ft 5 in)
- Block: 220 cm (7 ft 3 in)

Volleyball information
- Position: Libero

Career
Years	Teams
2008 – 2015	(Vietnam) Nghệ An VC
2009 – 2010, 2014 – 2015	(Vietnam) Cao su Phú Riềng (loan)
2012 – 2013	(Vietnam) Xây lắp dầu khí Thái Bình Dương (loan)
2016 – 2024	(Vietnam) Đức Giang Chemical
2023	(Vietnam) Sport Center 1 (selected team)

National team
2018, 2022 – 2023; 2010 – 2012; 2009 – 2010	Vietnam; Vietnam U20; Vietnam U18
Honours
Women's volleyball
Representing Vietnam
Southeast Asian Games
Silver medal – second place	2021 Quảng Ninh	Team
Silver medal – second place	2023 Phnom Penh	Team
SEA V.League
Silver medal – second place	2022 Nakhon Ratchasima	Team
Silver medal – second place	2023 Chiang Mai	Team

Lê Thị Thanh Liên (born July 4, 1993) is a retired Vietnamese volleyball player. She is a former member of Vietnam women's national volleyball team and Đức Giang Chemical volleyball club. She announced her retirement in early 2025.

== Clubs ==
- (Vietnam) Nghệ An VC (2008 – 2015)
- (Vietnam) Cao su Phú Riềng (2009 – 2010, 2014 – 2015) (loan)
- (Vietnam) Xây lắp dầu khí Thái Bình Dương (2012 – 2013) (loan)
- (Vietnam) Đức Giang Chemical (2016 – 2024)
- (Vietnam) Sport Center 1 (2023) (selected team)

== Career ==
=== National teams ===
- 2018 Asian Cup — 5th Place
- 2021 SEA Games — Silver Medal
- 2022 Asian Cup — 4th Place
- 2022 ASEAN Grand Prix — Runner-up
- 2023 SEA Games — Silver Medal
- 2023 SEA V.League – Second Leg — Runner-up
- 2023 Asian Championship — 4th Place

=== Clubs ===
- 2020 Vietnam League – Runner-up, with Đức Giang Chemical
- 2021 Vietnam League – Runner-up, with Đức Giang Chemical
- 2022 Vietnam League – Runner-up, with Đức Giang Chemical
- 2023 Vietnam League – Runner-up, with Đức Giang Chemical
- 2023 Asian Club Championship – Champion, with Sport Center 1
- 2024 Vietnam League – Runner-up, with Đức Giang Chemical

== Awards ==
- 2020 Vietnam League "Best digger"
- 2021 Vietnam League "Best digger"
- 2022 Vietnam League "Best digger"
- 2023 VTV Cup "Best libero"
