= 2023 VTV International Women's Volleyball Cup =

Tournament details
- Host country: Vietnam
- Dates: 19–26 August
- Teams: 6
- Venue: 1 (in 1 host city)

Final positions
- Champions: Vietnam (6th title)

Tournament awards
- MVP: (Vietnam) Trần Thị Thanh Thúy

The 2023 VTV Cup was the 17th staging of the international tournament. The tournament was held at the Lào Cai Gymnasium in Lào Cai, Vietnam.

== Pool composition ==
7 teams were set to participate at the tournament. Host Vietnam sent two national teams to compete along with five guest teams. However, on 16 August 2023, Mongolia announced that they withdrew from the tournament.

- Vietnam 1 (hosts)
- Vietnam 2 (hosts)
- Australia
- ~~Mongolia~~
- (Japan) Kansai University of Social Welfare
- (South Korea) Suwon City
- (Philippines) Choco Mucho Flying Titans

== Preliminary round ==
- All times are Indochina Time (UTC+07:00).

Pos	Team	Pld	W	L	Pts	SW	SL	SR	SPW	SPL	SPR	Qualification
1	Vietnam 1	5	5	0	15	15	2	7.500	418	324	1.290	Semifinals
2	Vietnam 2	5	4	1	11	13	6	2.167	447	392	1.140	Semifinals
3	(Philippines) Choco Mucho Flying Titans	5	3	2	9	11	9	1.222	431	418	1.031	Semifinals
4	(Japan) Kansai University of Social Welfare	5	2	3	6	8	10	0.800	391	414	0.944	Semifinals
5	(South Korea) Suwon City	5	1	4	4	6	13	0.462	393	440	0.893	5th place match
6	Australia	5	0	5	0	2	15	0.133	329	421	0.781	5th place match

Date	Time		Score		Set 1	Set 2	Set 3	Set 4	Set 5	Total	Report
19 Aug	15:00	Kansai University of Social Welfare (Japan)	1–3	(Philippines) Choco Mucho Flying Titans	17–25	23–25	25–19	22–25		87–94	
19 Aug	17:00	Vietnam 2	3–1	(South Korea) Suwon City	23–25	25–12	25–21	25–16		98–74	
19 Aug	19:30	Vietnam 1	3–0	Australia	25–18	25–11	25–15			75–44	
20 Aug	15:00	Suwon City (South Korea)	0–3	(Japan) Kansai University of Social Welfare	18–25	16–25	22–25			56–75	
20 Aug	17:00	Vietnam 2	3–0	Australia	25–23	25–18	25–19			75–60	
20 Aug	19:00	Vietnam 1	3–0	(Philippines) Choco Mucho Flying Titans	25–21	25–19	25–16			75–56	
21 Aug	15:00	Australia	0–3	(Philippines) Choco Mucho Flying Titans	15–25	23–25	10–25			48–75	
21 Aug	17:00	Vietnam 2	3–0	(Japan) Kansai University of Social Welfare	25–23	25–19	25–21			75–63	
21 Aug	19:00	Suwon City (South Korea)	0–3	Vietnam 1	23–25	20–25	26–28			69–78	
22 Aug	15:00	Suwon City (South Korea)	3–1	Australia	25–21	22–25	25–20	25–20		97–86	
22 Aug	17:00	Vietnam 2	3–2	(Philippines) Choco Mucho Flying Titans	20–25	26–28	25–21	25–20	15–9	111–103	
22 Aug	19:00	Kansai University of Social Welfare (Japan)	1–3	Vietnam 1	10–25	19–25	25–23	13–25		67–98	
23 Aug	15:00	Choco Mucho Flying Titans (Philippines)	3–2	(South Korea) Suwon City	16–25	22–25	25–19	25–17	15–11	103–97	
23 Aug	17:00	Australia	1–3	(Japan) Kansai University of Social Welfare	26–24	22–25	22–25	21–25		91–99	
23 Aug	19:00	Vietnam 1	3–1	Vietnam 2	17–25	25–18	25–23	25–22		92–88	

Fixtures: VTV

== Final round ==
=== 5th place match ===
Date	Time		Score		Set 1	Set 2	Set 3	Set 4	Set 5	Total	Report
26 Aug	15:00	Suwon City (South Korea)	2–3	Australia	23–25	25–21	26–24	22–25	17–19	113–114	

=== Final four ===
Semifinals
25 August
Vietnam 1	3
(Japan) Kansai University of Social Welfare	0
25 August
Vietnam 2	3
(Philippines) Choco Mucho Flying Titans	2

Final
26 August
Vietnam 1	3
Vietnam 2	0
3rd place match
26 August
(Japan) Kansai University of Social Welfare	1
(Philippines) Choco Mucho Flying Titans	3

==== Semifinals ====
Date	Time		Score		Set 1	Set 2	Set 3	Set 4	Set 5	Total	Report
25 Aug	17:00	Vietnam 1	3–0	(Japan) Kansai University of Social Welfare	25–21	25–17	25–18			75–56	
25 Aug	19:00	Vietnam 2	3–2	(Philippines) Choco Mucho Flying Titans	25–18	18–25	25–12	22–25	15–5	105–85	

==== 3rd place match ====
Date	Time		Score		Set 1	Set 2	Set 3	Set 4	Set 5	Total	Report
26 Aug	17:00	Kansai University of Social Welfare (Japan)	1–3	(Philippines) Choco Mucho Flying Titans	20–25	25–23	13–25	18–25		76–98	

==== Final ====
Date	Time		Score		Set 1	Set 2	Set 3	Set 4	Set 5	Total	Report
26 Aug	19:00	Vietnam 1	3–0	Vietnam 2	25–14	26–24	25–19			76–57	

== Final standing ==
Rank	Team
1st place, gold medalist(s)	Vietnam 1
2nd place, silver medalist(s)	Vietnam 2
3rd place, bronze medalist(s)	(Philippines) Choco Mucho Flying Titans
4	(Japan) Kansai University of Social Welfare
5	Australia
6	(South Korea) Suwon City

2023 VTV Cup champions

Vietnam
6th title

== Awards ==
- Most valuable player
  Trần Thị Thanh Thúy (VIE) (Vietnam 1)
- Best setter
  Đoàn Thị Lâm Oanh (VIE) (Vietnam 1)
- Best outside spikers
  Sisi Rondina (PHI) (Choco Mucho Flying Titans)
  Hikaru Tamura (JPN) (Kansai University of Social Welfare)
- Best middle blockers
  Maddie Madayag (PHI) (Choco Mucho Flying Titans)
  Lê Thanh Thúy (VIE) (Vietnam 2)
- Best opposite spiker
  Hoàng Thị Kiều Trinh (VIE) (Vietnam 1)
- Best libero
  Lê Thị Thanh Liên (VIE) (Vietnam 2)
- Miss VTV Cup 2023
  Hoàng Thị Kiều Trinh (VIE) (Vietnam 1)
