= Boxing at the 2010 South American Games – Men's 51kg =

The Men's 51 kg event at the 2010 South American Games had its quarterfinals held on March 23, the semifinals on March 25 and the final on March 27.

== Medalists ==
Gold	Silver	Bronze
Cei Avila; Colombia	Julião Henriques Neto; Brazil	Luis Caycho Davila; Peru; Fernando Martinez; Argentina

== Results ==
=== Main Bracket ===
Quarterfinals
Julião Henriques Neto (BRA)	6
José Luis Meza (ECU)	1
Fernando Martinez (ARG)	10
Evier Hernandez (VEN)	7

Semifinals
Luis Caycho Davila (PER)	2
Cei Avila (COL)	19
Julião Henriques Neto (BRA)	8
Fernando Martinez (ARG)	2

Final
Cei Avila (COL)	13
Julião Henriques Neto (BRA)	6
