= Zach Ramin =

Filipino tenpin bowler

Zach Sales Ramin
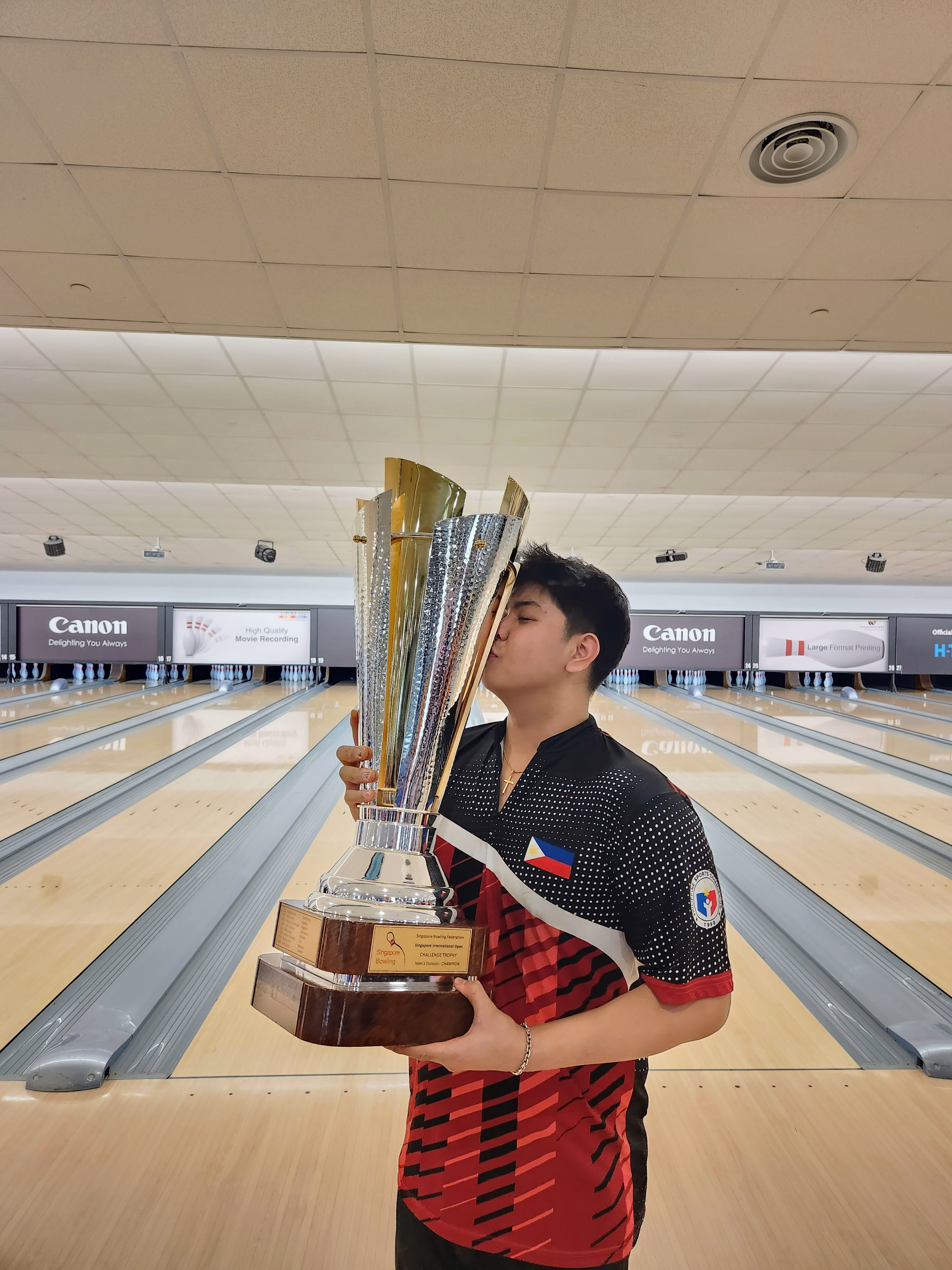
- Ramin in Singapore International Open 2023
- Born: Zach Sales Ramin; August 21, 2005 (age 20); Quezon City, Philippines
- Awards: 2024 Philippine Sportswriters Association Annual Awards (Major Citation), 3rd Siklab Sports Youth Awards (Special Citation)

Zach Sales Ramin (born August 21, 2005), is a Filipino ten-pin bowling player currently based in Singapore and part of the Philippine national bowling team since 2023.

== Early life and career ==
Zach Sales Ramin was born in the Philippines and raised by Filipino migrant parents and bowlers in Singapore. He started his bowling career at the age of 10 years old when he begged his parents to play bowling at several Filipino bowling clubs in Singapore, with his interest began while on a family vacation in Japan. He then begged his parents to enroll in the Strike Academy in Singapore under the tutelage of former South Korean national bowler Kim Eun Jung. A year later, he then played and won in different national age group tournaments and started to become part of the national youth team in 2022.

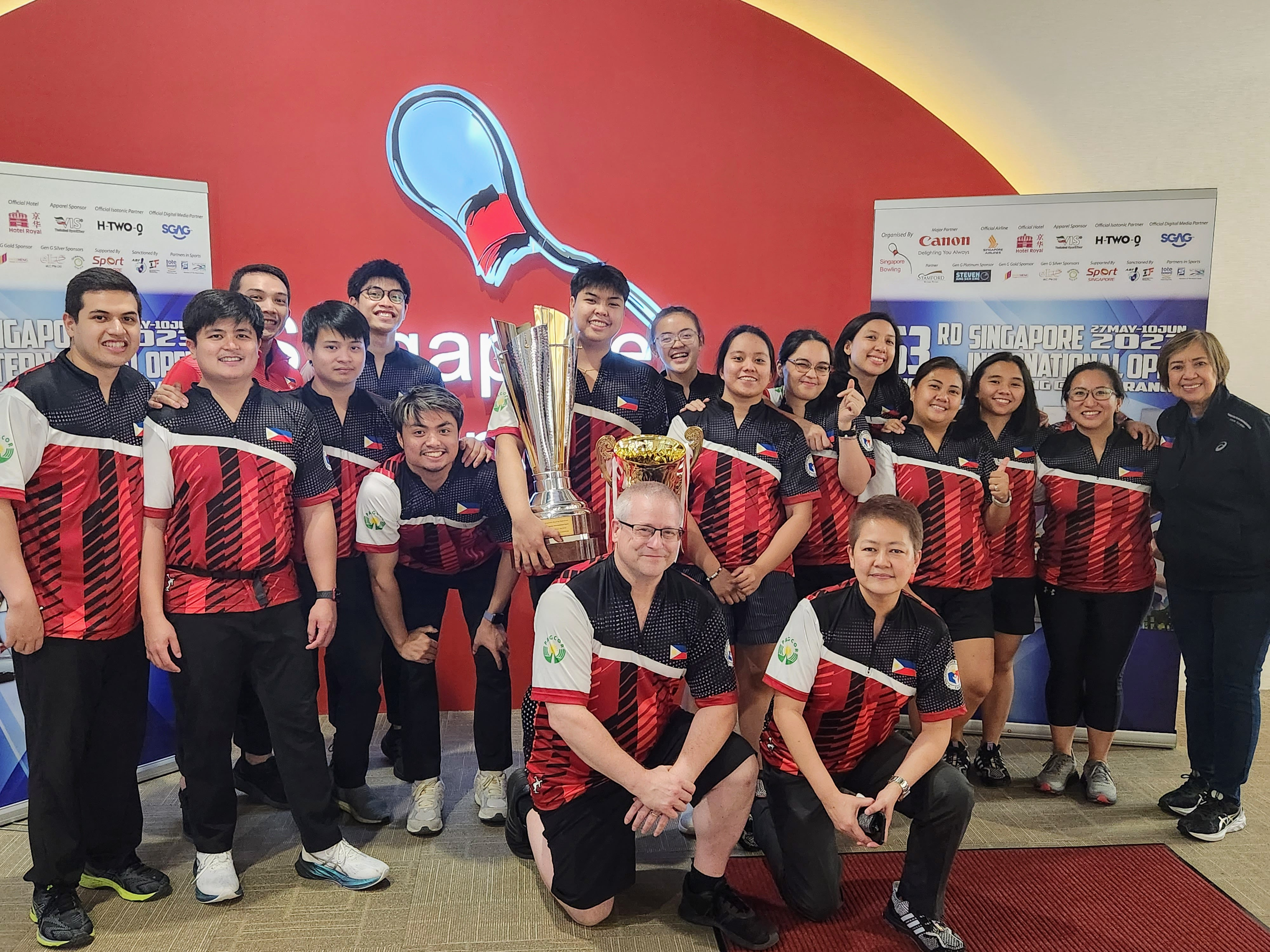
Ramin (center) wins the Singapore International Open 2023

In June 2023, Ramin caught the attention of the public when he became the youngest participant, as well as the first male Filipino bowler and 4th overall alongside Bong Coo, Cecille Yap and Liza del Rosario to win the 53rd Singapore International Open Bowling Championship title. In the same year, he was part of the Boys Team, composed of Marc Custodio, Stephen Diwa and Artegal Barrientos to capture one of two gold medals in the 21st Asian Youth Tenpin Bowling Championships held in Bangkok, Thailand.

As a second-generation Singapore Permanent Resident, Ramin has undergone two-year enlistment with the Singaporean military and a hiatus from competing for the Philippines in international competitions until September 2026 except joining competitions held in Singapore.

== National Honors ==
- 2024 PSA Annual Awards - Major Awardee
- 3rd Siklab Sports Youth Awards - Special Citation

== See also ==
- Paeng Nepomuceno
- Biboy Rivera
