= Technical decision =

Term for stopping a boxing fight

A technical decision is a term used in combat sports when a fight has to be stopped because of an unintentional foul or injury.

In mixed martial arts, a technical decision occurs when a fighter is rendered unable to continued by a foul and the majority of the final round has already been completed.

== Boxing ==
Boxing referees must pay close attention to the action between fighters, especially when they are fighting close to each other, because if a fighter is cut, the referee must decide whether it was caused by a punch or a head collision. Only the referee can make that decision.

Most head collisions in boxing are unintentional, especially when both boxers are trying for a knockout and/or fighting at close range. An intentional head butt is considered a flagrant foul that can result in disqualification of the offender.

In the case of a cut to the head, the referee must consult the ringside physician as many times as the referee thinks necessary, whether or not the referee decides the cut was caused by a punch. If the doctor decides that the fighter cannot continue, the referee must stop the fight. If the referee decides that a punch caused the cut, the other boxer wins by technical knockout. If the referee decides it was produced by an unintentional headbutt, then so long as the fight has gone the required distance under the rules in effect for that fight, the judges at ringside must hand over their scorecards (including scores for the incomplete round), and the fighter ahead on points wins by technical decision.

If an intentional foul causes an injury where the contest is allowed to continue, but the fighter is unable to continue in a subsequent round, special rules are imposed once the fight has reached official status. If the fighter who is unable to continue is ahead on points, he wins. If the fighter is behind or tied, the fight is declared a technical draw because the fighter who deliberately fouls is ineligible to win.

The rules governing the required distance for a fighter to be declared a winner by technical decision vary by federation. Some require the fight to be in at least the fourth round; others (and most championship fights) require the fight to be past the halfway point (i.e., five rounds for a 10-round match; six rounds for a 12-round match). If a fight is stopped because of an unintentional headbutt without reaching the required distance, it is automatically declared a technical draw. Generally, every country where boxing is practiced accepts the four round or the halfway point as the right distance for a fight to be won or lost by technical decisions.

A unique case happened between world champions Daniel Santos and Antonio Margarito: both of their fights ended in technical decisions, which is very rare in boxing. Their first bout was declared a draw, as it had gone only one minute before being stopped, and Santos won by a ten-round split technical decision in their rematch.

One of the most controversial technical decisions in boxing history occurred in May 1994, when Julio César Chávez regained the World Boxing Council Light Welterweight title over his previous conqueror, Frankie Randall. Large percentages of both members of the media and the Pay Per View public had Randall ahead by a substantial amount when the fight was stopped in the eighth round by a cut on Chávez's head, but the judges viewed the fight otherwise, giving the fight to Chávez by a split technical decision. Boxing magazines such as The Ring and KO criticized the judges, particularly judge Ray Solis, for scoring the fight for Chávez.
