= Fernando Martínez (boxer) =

Argentine boxer (born 1991)

Personal information
- Nickname: Pumita
- Born: Fernando Daniel Martínez; 18 July 1991 (age 35) Avellaneda, Argentina
- Height: 5 ft 2 in (157 cm)
- Weight: Super flyweight

Boxing career
- Reach: 64 in (163 cm)
- Stance: Orthodox

Boxing record
- Total fights: 19
- Wins: 18
- Win by KO: 9
- Losses: 1
Medal record
Men's Amateur boxing
Representing Argentina
South American Games
Bronze medal – third place	2010 Medellin	Flyweight

Fernando Daniel Martínez (born 18 July 1991) is an Argentine professional boxer. He is a former World Boxing Association (WBA) and International Boxing Federation (IBF) super-flyweight champion.

== Amateur career ==
He competed in the men's flyweight event at the 2016 Summer Olympics.

== Professional career ==
=== Early career ===
Martínez made his professional debut against Juan Ignacio Haran on 25 August 2017. He won the fight by a fourth-round stoppage. Martínez amassed a 10–0 record during the next two years, with six victories coming by way of stoppage.

Martínez had his first step-up fight on 16 December 2019, as he was scheduled to challenge the reigning WBC Silver super flyweight champion Athenkosi Dumezweni. The bout took place in East London, Eastern Cape in South Africa, and was Martínez's first outside of Argentina. He won the fight by an upset eleventh-round technical knockout, stopping Dumezweni with a flurry of punches at the 0:23 minute mark.

Martínez next faced Angel Nicolas Aquino on 11 December 2020, at the Estadio Mary Terán de Weiss in Buenos Aires, Argentina. He won the closely contested bout by split decision, with scores of 95–94, 97–92 and 94–95.

Martínez faced Gonzalo Garcia Duran in a stay-busy fight on 13 August 2021, at the Hotel Atlantis The Palm in Dubai. He won the fight by a fourth-round technical knockout, stopping Duran with eight seconds left in the round.

=== Super-flyweight world champion ===
==== Martínez vs Ancajas ====
Martínez was booked to challenge the reigning IBF super flyweight champion Jerwin Ancajas on 26 February 2022, in what was Ancajas' tenth title defense. The title fight was scheduled for the undercard of the Chris Colbert and Hector Garcia WBA super featherweight bout, which took place at the Cosmopolitan in Las Vegas, Nevada. Despite entering the fight as the underdog, Martínez captured the title by an upset unanimous decision. One judge scored the fight 117–111 in his favor, while the remaining two judges awarded him a 118–110 scorecard. Martínez landed 427 out of 1046 total punches thrown, while Ancajas landed 192 out of 816 total punches.

On 22 July 2022, it was revealed that Ancajas had invoked his rematch clause. As such, Martínez was booked to face Jerwin Ancajas in an immediate rematch in his first championship defense, which took place on 8 October 2022, at the Home Depot Center in Carson, California. The bout was scheduled for the undercard of the Sebastian Fundora and Carlos Ocampo interim WBC middleweight title bout. He retained the title by unanimous decision, with two scorecards of 118–110 and one scorecard of 119–109.

==== Martínez vs Bornea ====
On 16 December 2022, the IBF formally ordered Martínez to make a mandatory title defense against Jade Bornea. As the pair failed to reach terms, a purse bid was called for 17 January 2023, which was postponed to allow for further negotiations, but eventually rescheduled for 14 February and won by TGB Promotions with a bid of $25,000. The championship bout took place on 24 June 2023, at the Minneapolis Armory in Minneapolis, Minnesota. Martínez won the fight by an eleventh-round technical knockout.

==== Martínez vs Ioka ====
It was revealed by various outlets on 4 April 2024, that Martínez would face the WBA flyweight champion Kazuto Ioka in a title unification bout. The bout took place at the Ryōgoku Kokugikan in Tokyo on 7 July 2024 with Martinez winning by unanimous decision.

==== Ioka vs Martinez 2 ====
Having vacated the IBF title, a rematch between Martinez and Ioka was held at City General Gymnasium in Ōta, Tokyo, Japan, on 11 May 2025. Once again Martina won via unanimous decision.

==== Martínez vs Rodriguez ====
Martinez lost his WBA title when he was knocked out in the 10th round by WBC and WBO super-flyweight champion Jesse Rodriguez at Kingdom Arena in Riyadh, Saudi Arabia, on 22 November 2025.

== Professional boxing record ==
19 fights	18 wins	1 loss
By knockout	9	1
By decision	9	0

No.	Result	Record	Opponent	Type	Round, time	Date	Location	Notes
19	Loss	18–1	Jesse Rodriguez	KO	10 (12), 1:25	22 Nov 2025	Kingdom Arena, Riyadh, Saudi Arabia	Lost WBA super-flyweight title; For WBC, WBO, and The Ring super-flyweight titles
18	Win	18–0	Kazuto Ioka	UD	12	11 May 2025	Ota City General Gymnasium, Tokyo, Japan	Retained WBA super-flyweight title
17	Win	17–0	Kazuto Ioka	UD	12	7 Jul 2024	Ryōgoku Kokugikan, Tokyo, Japan	Retained IBF super-flyweight title; Won WBA super-flyweight title
16	Win	16–0	Jade Bornea	TKO	11 (12), 0:29	24 Jun 2023	Minneapolis Armory, Minneapolis, Minnesota, U.S.	Retained IBF super-flyweight title
15	Win	15–0	Jerwin Ancajas	UD	12	8 Oct 2022	Dignity Health Sports Park, Carson, California, U.S.	Retained IBF super-flyweight title
14	Win	14–0	Jerwin Ancajas	UD	12	26 Feb 2022	Cosmopolitan of Las Vegas, Paradise, Nevada, U.S.	Won IBF super-flyweight title
13	Win	13–0	Gonzalo Garcia Duran	TKO	4 (8), 2:52	13 Aug 2021	Hotel Atlantis The Palm, Dubai, United Arab Emirates	
12	Win	12–0	Angel Nicolas Aquino	SD	10	11 Dec 2020	Estadio Mary Terán de Weiss, Buenos Aires, Argentina	
11	Win	11–0	Athenkosi Dumezweni	TKO	11 (12), 0:23	16 Dec 2019	International Convention Centre, East London, South Africa	Won WBC Silver super-flyweight title
10	Win	10–0	Abel Leandro Silva	UD	10	7 Jun 2019	Club Social y Deportivo El Porvenir, Quilmes, Argentina	
9	Win	9–0	Carlos Ariel Farias	KO	7 (10)	29 Mar 2019	Club Social y Deportivo El Porvenir, Quilmes, Argentina	
8	Win	8–0	Abel Leandro Silva	UD	6	12 Jan 2019	Estadio Polideportivo, Mar del Plata, Argentina	
7	Win	7–0	Matias Emanuel Iriarte Monserrat	TKO	1 (10), 2:33	7 Dec 2018	Club Social y Deportivo El Porvenir, Quilmes, Argentina	
6	Win	6–0	Carlos Ruben Dario Ruiz	KO	1 (10), 0:57	26 Oct 2018	Club Social y Deportivo El Porvenir, Quilmes, Argentina	
5	Win	5–0	Marcos Emilio Villafane	KO	2 (6), 3:00	31 Aug 2018	Club Social y Deportivo El Porvenir, Quilmes, Argentina	
4	Win	4–0	Fabian Hernan Claro	KO	2 (10), 2:55	18 May 2018	Club Social y Deportivo El Porvenir, Quilmes, Argentina	Won vacant Argentine super-flyweight title
3	Win	3–0	Nicolas Nahuel Botelli	UD	6	6 Apr 2018	Club Social y Deportivo El Porvenir, Quilmes, Argentina	
2	Win	2–0	Santiago Jesus Priotti	UD	4	22 Dec 2017	Club Social y Deportivo El Porvenir, Quilmes, Argentina	
1	Win	1–0	Juan Ignacio Haran	RTD	4 (4), 3:00	25 Aug 2017	Club Social y Deportivo El Porvenir, Quilmes, Argentina	

== See also ==
- List of world super-flyweight boxing champions

Sporting positions
Regional boxing titles
Vacant Title last held by Roberto Domingo Sosa	Argentine super-flyweight champion 18 May 2018 – 26 February 2022; Won world title	Vacant Title next held by Tobias Reyes
Preceded by Athenkosi Dumezweni	WBC silver super-flyweight champion 16 December 2019 – 26 February 2022; Won world title	Vacant Title next held by Tasif Khan
World boxing titles
Preceded by Jerwin Ancajas	IBF super-flyweight champion 26 February 2022 – 29 October 2024; Vacated	Vacant Title next held by Willibaldo Garcia
Preceded by Kazuto Ioka	WBA super-flyweight champion 7 July 2024 – 22 November 2025	Succeeded by Jesse Rodriguez
