= Tasif Khan =

English boxer (born 1982)

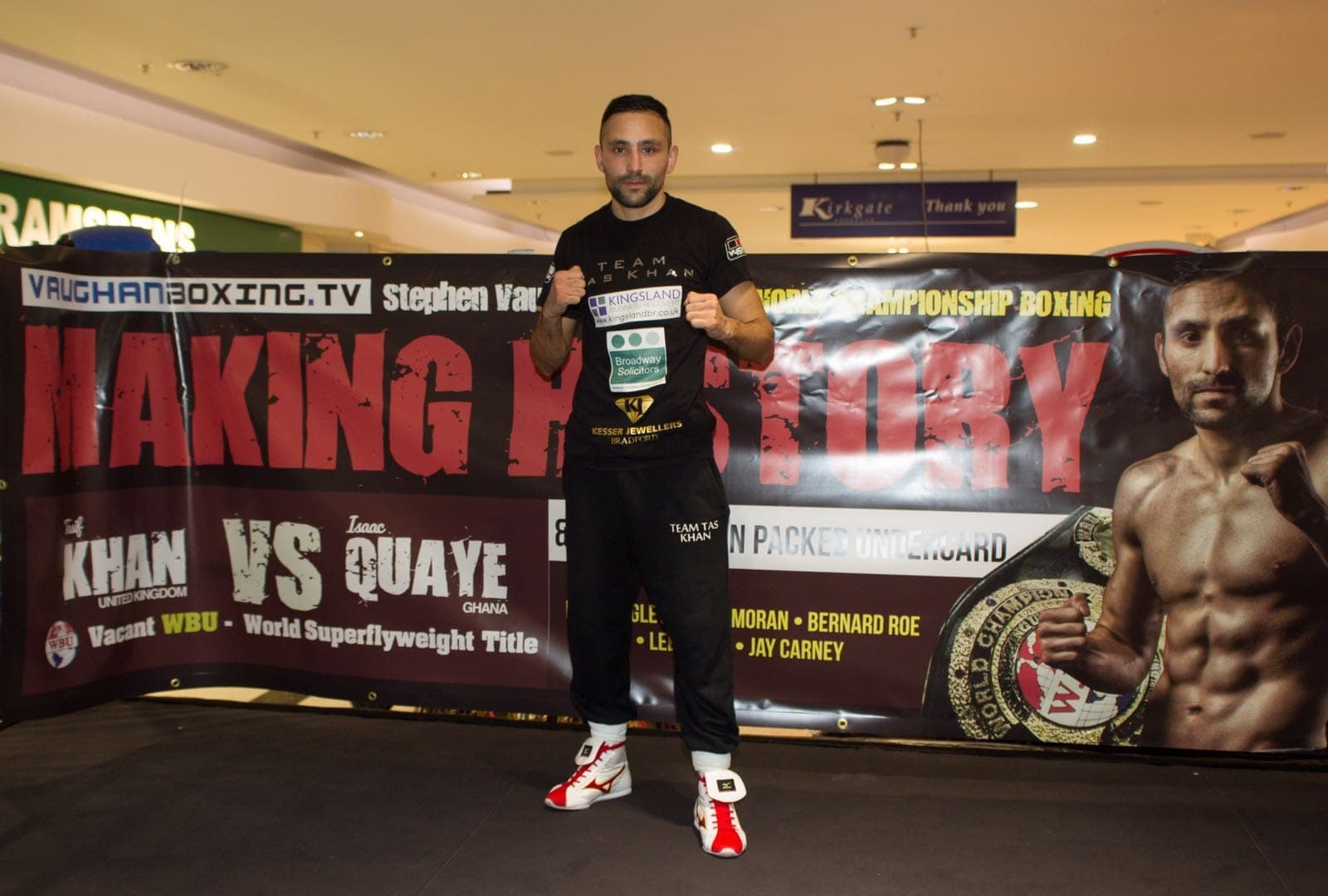
Professional Bradford-based boxer Tasif Khan poses ahead of his upcoming fight with Ghana boxer Isaac Quaye.

Tasif Khan, born 29 December 1982, is a British super flyweight professional boxer.

He has won a number of championship belts, including the super flyweight World Champion. (World Boxing Union), Super flyweight World Champion, (Global Boxing Union), Bantamweight World Champion (World Boxing Confederation) and the International Masters Champion.

Outside of boxing, Khan is an Ambassador for the Kashmir Orphans Relief Trust (KORT), a registered UK charity. KORT works in Pakistan to aid orphans and children in need.

== Early life ==
Born in Bradford, West Yorkshire, Khan started boxing at the age of 10 at the Bradford Police Boys amateur boxing club, in the Girlington area of Bradford, under Mr Allan (Pop Allan). During his early boxing days, Khan pursued a path of teaching in a primary school as a day job at Atlas Community Primary School, where he taught physical education.

== Boxing career ==
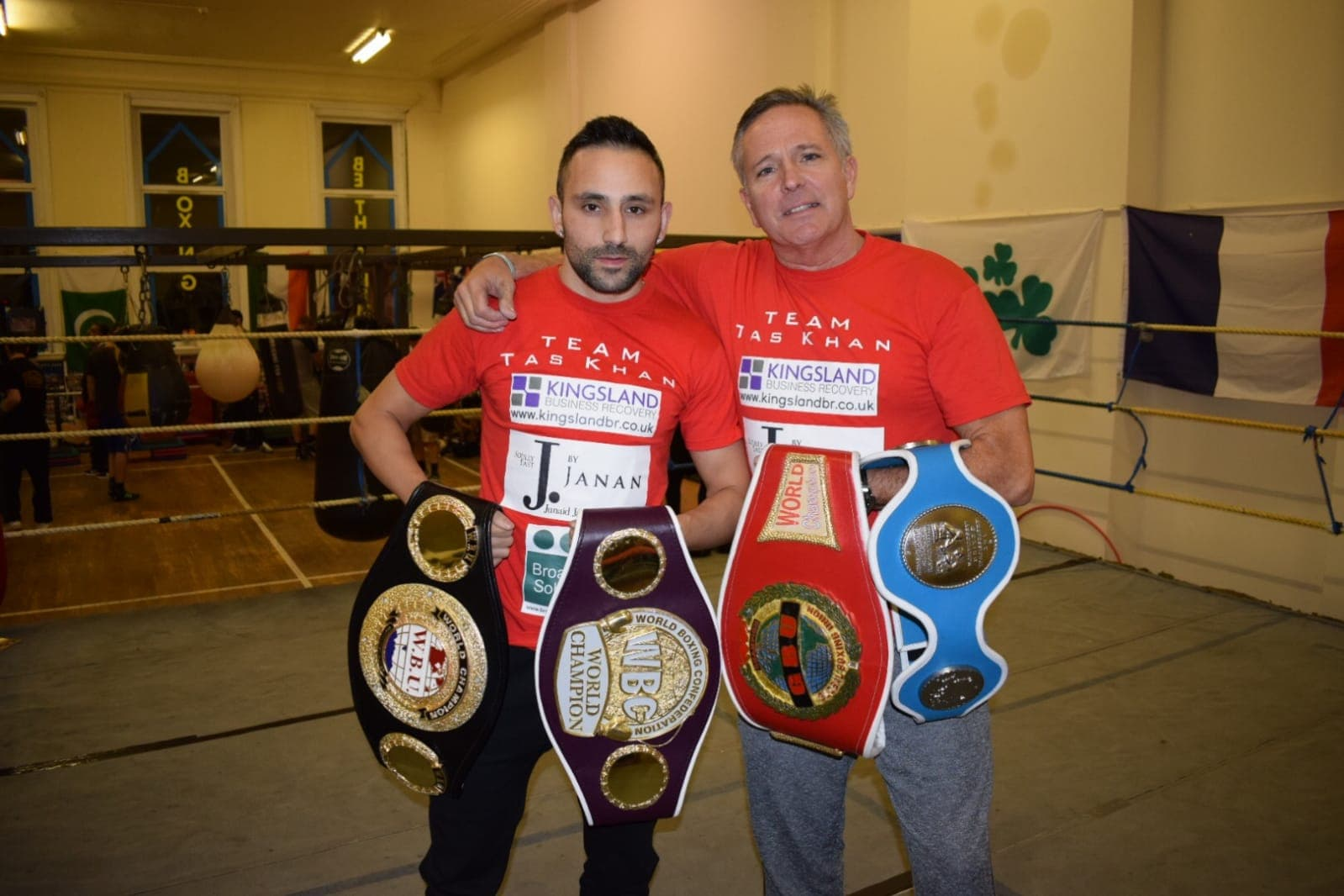
Tasif with his Championship belts.

Prior to turning professional, he became the North of England Champion in 2004, the National England finalist in 2005, and held the Yorkshire and Humber Champion title for six years. Turning professional, Khan rose also fought on the undercard of the Amir Khan v Paul Mckloskey boxing bout in Manchester MEN arena.

Khan has won the Super flyweight World Champion (World Boxing Union), Superflyweight World Champion (Global Boxing Union), Bantamweight World Champion (World Boxing Confederation) and the International Masters Champion. He is also a champion boxing fighter whom, as won the African Title.

Tasif Khan is promoted by Monarch Promotions.

== Charity and community work ==
Khan is an Ambassador for the Kashmir Orphans Relief Trust (KORT), a registered UK charity (Charity No. 1113836), and has been deployed to Pakistan to oversee projects and visit beneficiaries. Khan also ran the Kirklees 10K Challenge on 11 May 2019 and the Tatton 10K Challenge on 12 May 2019 while fasting during the month of Ramadan to raise funds for KORT

Khan has also been named a Community Champion in Bradford, a scheme which sees local people from different walks of life visit schools and talk to pupils about how they have made a success of their lives. Khan was among other champions who visited Carlton Bolling School in 2018 to give an assembly to Year 11 pupils

He has made a number of appearances, including the launch of a new £1.5m easyGym opening in Bradford city centre in 2017 and a literacy campaign launched by Bradford Council and National Literacy Trust in 2014.

== Professional boxing record ==
19 fights	16 wins	1 loss
By knockout	8	0
By decision	8	1
Draws	2	

No.	Result	Record	Opponent	Type	Round, time	Date	Location	Notes
19	Win	16–1–2	(Ghana) Gabriel Odoi Laryea	UD	12	20 Dec 2022	Eko Club, Lagos, Nigeria	
18	Win	15–1–2	(Colombia) Michael Arango	TKO	2 (8), 0:40	22 Oct 2022	Dreifachturnhalle, Huckelhoven, Germany	
17	Win	14–1–2	(Colombia) Jose Antonio Jimenez	KO	1 (8), 2:54	23 Apr 2022	Dreifachturnhalle, Huckelhoven, Germany	
16	Win	13–1–2	(Colombia) Ronald Ramos	TKO	3 (8), 1:18	30 Oct 2021	Dreifachturnhalle, Huckelhoven, Germany	
15	Win	12–1–2	(Ghana) Asamoah Wilson	TKO	3 (12), 1:26	22 Dec 2018	Landmark Events Centre, Lagos, Nigeria	
14	Win	11–1–2	(Ghana) Isaac Quaye	TKO	6 (12), 1:54	6 Feb 2016	(United Kingdom) Cedar Court Hotel, Bradford, England	
13	Win	10–1–2	(Georgia (country)) Mikheil Soloninkini	UD	10	2 May 2015	(United Kingdom) York Hall, Bethnal Green, England	
12	Win	9–1–2	(Czech Republic) Ladislav Miko	TKO	1 (6), 1:15	20 Mar 2015	(United Kingdom) Grand Central Hall, Liverpool, England	
11	Win	8–1–2	(Hungary) Richard Voros	TKO	2 (4), 1:05	30 Jan 2015	(United Kingdom) York Hall, Bethnal Green, England	
10	Win	7–1–2	(Slovakia) Elemir Rafael	PTS	4	9 Dec 2012	(United Kingdom) De Vere Whites Hotel, Bolton, England	
9	Win	6–1–2	(United Kingdom) Delroy Spencer	PTS	4	4 Feb 2012	(United Kingdom) De Vere Whites Hotel, Bolton, England	
8	Win	5–1–2	(Latvia) Pavels Senkovs	PTS	4	16 Apr 2011	(United Kingdom) Manchester Arena, Manchester, England	
7	Win	4–1–2	(Latvia) Pavels Senkovs	PTS	4	26 Nov 2010	(United Kingdom) De Vere Whites Hotel, Bolton, England	
6	Win	3–1–2	(United Kingdom) Francis Croes	PTS	4	16 Jul 2010	(United Kingdom) Bolton Arena, Bolton, England	
5	Draw	2–1–2	(United Kingdom) Anwar Alfadli	PTS	4	24 May 2009	(United Kingdom) Rio Grande Banqueting Hall, Bradford, England	
4	Loss	2–1–1	(United Kingdom) Stuart McFadyen	PTS	4	6 Jul 2007	(United Kingdom) Robin Park Centre, Wigan, England	
3	Win	2–0–1	(United Kingdom) Delroy Spencer	PTS	6	28 May 2006	(United Kingdom) Light Waves Leisure Centre, Wakefield, England	
2	Win	1–0–1	(United Kingdom) Neil Read	TKO	6 (6), 2:13	23 Feb 2006	(United Kingdom) Town Hall, Leeds, England	
1	Draw	0–0–1	(United Kingdom) Gary Ford	PTS	6	20 Nov 2005	(United Kingdom) Tara Leisure Centre, Shaw, England	
