= PBA Esports Bakbakan =

Esports league in the Philippines

- One of the league's logo variations (Note: The style of the BAKBAKAN text varies depending on the game being played.)

Tournament information
- Game: Mobile Legends: Bang Bang; PUBG: Battlegrounds; StreetBallers
- Location: Philippines
- Established: 2023
- Number of tournaments: 1
- Administrator: Philippine Basketball Association; Dark League Studios
- Participants: MLBB/PUBG: 12; StreetBallers: 8

Current champion
- TNT Tropang Giga

Most recent tournament
- PBA Esports Bakbakan: PUBG: Battlegrounds

PBA Esports Bakbakan is an esports league in the Philippines. It is organized by the Philippine Basketball Association (PBA) in partnership with Dark League Studios. The league consists of the esport squads of the PBA's twelve franchise teams. The first tournament featured Mobile Legends: Bang Bang while the following competition had PUBG: Battlegrounds.

The third tournament which had StreetBallers featured eight teams from outside the PBA.

== History ==
The Philippine Basketball Association (PBA) has planned to organize esports games in-between its league games during its 46th season in 2021. However the COVID-19 pandemic caused such plan to be placed on hold. In 2022, the PBA revisited its plans to get involved in esports and accepted an invitation by Dark League Studios to check their Kings League tournament. The PBA would enter in an entered a formal partnership with Dark League Studios in October 2022.

The PBA would launch an esports league, the PBA Esports Bakbakan, in January 2023. The tournament would be held in partnership with Dark League Studios. The inaugural season would feature the PBA's twelve franchise team with Mobile Legends: Bang Bang as the video game title featured. The draft for the first tournament was held on February 13, 2023. The TNT Tropang Giga became the inaugural champions.

In September 2023, the PBA organized a PUBG: Battlegrounds tournament with the 12 franchise teams. Barangay Ginebra San Miguel won the tournament.

Within the same month, the PBA launched the StreetBallers tournament. The final tournament had eight teams which qualified from 20 teams across the country. StreetBallers is a mobile game developed by PlayPark.

== Teams ==
The twelve PBA franchise teams (Mobile Legends: Bang Bang and PUBG: Battlegrounds)

Team	Company	Colors
Barangay Ginebra San Miguel	Ginebra San Miguel, Inc. (Note: Denotes a San Miguel Corporation subsidiary)	
Blackwater Bossing	Ever Bilena Cosmetics, Inc.	
Converge FiberXers	Converge ICT Solutions, Inc.	
Magnolia Hotshots	San Miguel Food and Beverage	
Meralco Bolts	Manila Electric Company (Note: Denotes a team owned by Manuel V. Pangilinan)	
NLEX Road Warriors	NLEX Corporation	
NorthPort Batang Pier	Sultan 900 Capital, Inc.	
Phoenix Super LPG Fuel Masters	Phoenix Petroleum Philippines, Inc.	
Rain or Shine Elasto Painters	Asian Coatings Philippines, Inc.	
San Miguel Beermen	San Miguel Brewery, Inc.	
Terrafirma Dyip	Terrafirma Realty Development Corporation	
TNT Tropang Giga	Smart Communications	

StreetBallers

- Batang 90s
- Diablo
- HGL
- Minana
- MNN
- Ovlord
- Southstars
- Triple Threat

== Seasons ==
Season	Title	Final		
Season	Title	Champion	Score	Runner-up
2023	Mobile Legends: Bang Bang	TNT Tropang Giga	3–0	Barangay Ginebra San Miguel
2023	PUBG: Battlegrounds	Barangay Ginebra San Miguel	Round robin	Blackwater Bossing
2023	Dota 2			
