= Kansai University of Social Welfare =

Coordinates: 34°45′43″N 134°22′04″E

- 関西福祉大学
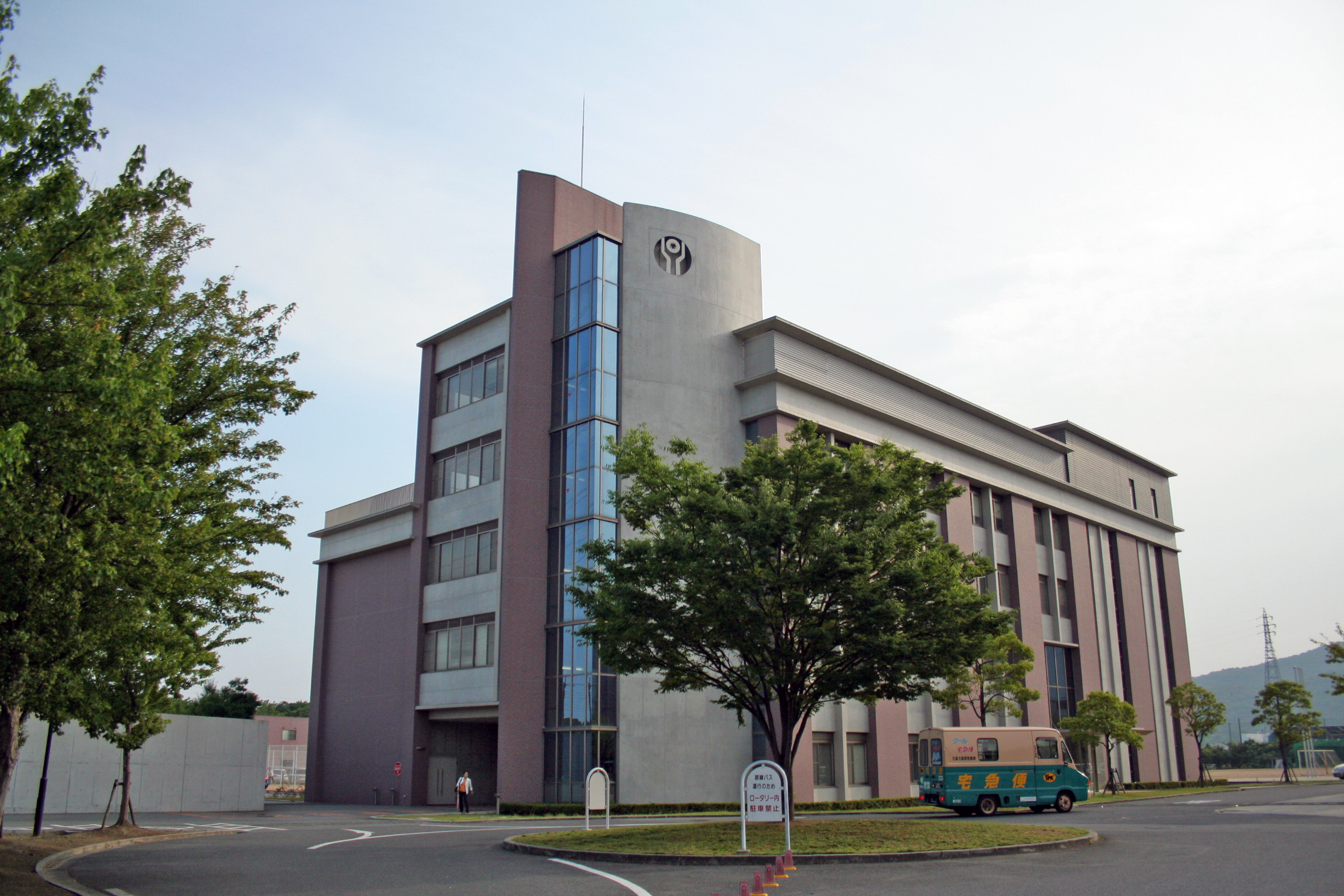
- Type: Private
- Established: 1997
- Location: Ako, Hyōgo, Japan
- Website: www.kusw.ac.jp

Kansai University of Social Welfare (関西福祉大学, Kansai fukushi daigaku) is a private university in Ako, Hyōgo, Japan, established in 1997.
