= Technical draw =

Term used in boxing when a fight has to be stopped

A technical draw is a term used in boxing when a fight has to be stopped because a fighter is unable to continue from an accidental injury (usually cuts) or foul.

Draws occur when the bout goes to the scorecards, and the officials cannot determine a winner. If a winner is determined, the decision is referred to as a technical decision.

Technical draws also occur when a bout has not completed a certain number of rounds (usually four), which makes it not an "official fight." Most states have eliminated the technical draw decision for bouts that do not go a required distance and have replaced it with a no contest, although the United Kingdom still uses the technical draw.

Technical draws are also used in boxing in cases of an injury caused by a deliberate foul. If a foul results in one boxer being injured, and later being unable to continue, a decision will be made based on scorecards, with a penalty on the offending boxer that he cannot win the match. The boxer injured by the foul can win the match on the scorecards, but if the offending boxer is ahead, the match is declared a technical draw.

== See also ==
- 10 Point System
