= Ricardo Villalba =

Argentine forester

Ricardo Villalba is an Argentine forester and dendrochronologist specialized in paleoclimate studies. He is active at CRICYT in Mendoza, Argentina. He was one of the authors of the IPCC Fourth Assessment Report.

Beginning in 2017 Villaba has faced legal charges from the environmental NGO Jáchal No se Toca. Villalba is accused of having led, as director of IANIGLA, a deficient survey of glaciers in the Jáchal area which led to various glaciers being left out. This would according to Jáchal No Se Toca have made it possible for Barrick Gold to install a mine the area with the ensuing pollution that followed. Argentine and international scientists have criticized the accusation against Villalba and the topic has been covered by the journals Science and Nature.

In 2023 he was granted the Konex Award Merit Diploma for his work in Ecology and Environmental Sciences in the last decade.
