= Jade Bornea =

Filipino boxer

Personal information
- Nickname: Hurricane
- Nationality: Filipino
- Born: 2 June 1995 (age 31) Arakan, Cotabato del Norte, Philippines
- Height: 1.63 m (5 ft 4 in)
- Weight: Super-flyweight

Boxing career
- Stance: Orthodox

Boxing record
- Total fights: 19
- Wins: 18
- Win by KO: 12
- Losses: 1
Medal record
Men's amateur boxing
Representing Philippines
Youth World Championships
Bronze medal – third place	2012 Yerevan	Light-flyweight

Jade Dajay Bornea (born 2 August 1995) is a Filipino professional boxer who has held the WBC-NABF super-flyweight title since January. As an amateur he represented the Philippines at the Youth World Championships, reaching the semi-finals of the light-flyweight bracket.

== Personal life ==
Bornea was born in Cotabato del Norte, but grew up in General Santos.

== Amateur career ==
Bornea's participation at the 2012 AIBA Youth World Championships ended after he lost to Murodjon Akhmadaliev of Uzbekistan, 14–25, in the quarter-finals of the light flyweight event.

=== 2012 AIBA Youth World Championships ===
- Defeated Dmitrijs Zaharovs (Latvia) PTS 19–6
- Defeated Tinko Banabakov (Bulgaria) PTS 19–10
- Defeated Jack Bateson (England) PTS 16–12
- Lost to Murodjon Akhmadaliev (Uzbekistan) PTS (14–25)

=== 2013 Asian Confederation Youth Boxing Championships results ===
- Defeated Murodjon Akhmadaliev (Uzbekistan) RSC-3
- Defeated Rakhmankul Avatov (Kyrgyzstan) PTS (16–6)
- Defeated Shatlykmyrat Myradov (Turkmenistan) (17–10)
- Defeated Kosei Tanaka (Japan) PTS (15–13)

== Professional career ==
Bornea made his professional debut against Alberto Muring on 11 October 2014. He won the fight by a fourth-round technical knockout. Borea amassed a 4–0 record before being booked to face Ronnie Sunido for the vacant MinProBA super flyweight title, his first professional belt, on 2 April 2016. He won the fight by a first-round knockout, stopping Sunido with four seconds left in the opening round. Borea fought for his first major regional title, the vacant IBF Youth super-flyweight title, on 26 February 2017, when he faced Raul Yu. He won the fight by unanimous decision, with scores of 98–92, 97–93 and 97–93.

Bornea faced Nicardo Calamba in a non-title bout on 23 July 2017. He won the fight by a second-round knockout. Borea then made his first IBF Youth super flyweight title defense against Samuthra Sitharan on 9 September 2017. He won the fight by a fourth-round technical knockout. Bornea faced John Rey Lauza in another non-title bout on 5 November 2017. He won the fight by a second-round knockout.

Bornea was booked to face Danrick Sumabong for the vacant WBO Oriental Youth super-flyweight title on 28 April 2017. He won the fight by unanimous decision, with scores of 97–93, 96–94 and 96–94. Bornea next faced Alvin Bais on 29 July 2018, and won the fight by a third-round knockout. Bornea faced Macrea Gandionco on 21 October 2018, in his final fight of the year. He won the fight by a fifth-round technical knockout.

Bornea faced Jonathan Francisco on 30 April 2019, in his sole fight of the year. He won the bout by a second-round technical knockout. Bornea faced Ernesto Delgadillo for the vacant WBC-NABF super-flyweight title on 30 January 2020. He won the fight by split decision, with two judges scoring the bout 96–93 in his favor, while the third judge awarded the same scorecard to Delgadillo.

Bornea faced Mohammed Obbadi in an IBF title eliminator on 14 January 2022, at the Auditorio Jacales in Monterrey, Mexico. He won the fight by a third-round knockout, stopping Jacales with an uppercut to the body at the 2:25 minute mark. Bornea was up 39–36, 40–35 and 39–36 on the scorecards at the time of the stoppage.

== Professional boxing record ==
19 fights	18 wins	1 loss
By knockout	12	1
By decision	6	0

No.	Result	Record	Opponent	Type	Round, time	Date	Location	Notes
19	Loss	18–1	Fernando Martínez	TKO	11 (12), 0:29	24 Jun 2023	Minneapolis Armory, Minneapolis, Minnesota, U.S.	For IBF super flyweight title
18	Win	18–0	Ivan Meneses	TKO	7 (8), 1:08	19 Aug 2022	Polideportivo Nuevo Sol, La Paz, Mexico	
17	Win	17–0	Mohammed Obbadi	KO	3 (12) 2:25	14 Jan 2022	Auditorio Jacales, Monterrey, Mexico	
16	Win	16–0	Roland Jay Biendima	UD	12	30 Apr 2021	Sanmman Gym, General Santos, Philippines	
15	Win	15–0	Ernesto Delgadillo	SD	10	30 Jan 2020	Legends Casino, Toppenish, Washington, US	Won vacant WBC-NABF super-flyweight title
14	Win	14–0	Jonathan Francisco	TKO	2 (10), 2:09	30 Apr 2019	Robinson’s Mall Atrium, General Santos, Philippines	
13	Win	13–0	Macrea Gandionco	TKO	5 (10)	21 Oct 2018	Midas Hotel and Casino, Pasay, Philippines	
12	Win	12–0	Alvin Bais	KO	3 (8), 2:03	29 Jul 2018	Robinson's Mall, General Santos, Philippines	
11	Win	11–0	Danrick Sumabong	UD	10	28 Apr 2018	Glan, Philippines	Won vacant WBO Oriental Youth super-flyweight title
10	Win	10–0	John Rey Lauza	KO	2 (8), 0:46	5 Nov 2017	Robinson’s Mall Atrium, General Santos, Philippines	
9	Win	9–0	Samuthra Sitharan	TKO	4 (10), 2:21	9 Sep 2017	Polomolok Gym, Polomolok, Philippines	Retained IBF Youth super-flyweight title
8	Win	8–0	Nicardo Calamba	KO	2 (6), 2:35	23 Jul 2017	Robinson's Place, General Santos, Philippines	
7	Win	7–0	Raul Yu	UD	10	26 Feb 2017	Lagao Gym, General Santos, Philippines	Won vacant IBF Youth super-flyweight title
6	Win	6–0	Albert Alcoy	TKO	2 (8), 2:32	21 Oct 2016	Makati Cinema Square Boxing Arena, Makati, Philippines	
5	Win	5–0	Ronnie Sunido	KO	1 (8), 2:56	2 Apr 2016	Oval Plaza Gym, General Santos, Philippines	Won vacant MinProBA super-flyweight title
4	Win	4–0	Salatiel Amit	UD	6	11 Jul 2015	Robinson’s Mall Atrium, General Santos, Philippines	
3	Win	3–0	Michael Bastasa	UD	6	28 Mar 2015	Ramon Magsaysay, Philippines	
2	Win	2–0	Armando Yee	RTD	2 (6), 3:00	8 Dec 2014	M'lang, Philippines	
1	Win	1–0	Alberto Muring	TKO	2 (4), 2:37	11 Oct 2014	Davao City Recreation Center, Davao City, Philippines	
