= Dmitry Chudinov =

Russian boxer

Personal information
- Nickname: Night Wolf
- Nationality: Russian
- Born: 15 September 1986 (age 39) Bratsk, Russian SFSR, Soviet Union (now Russia)
- Height: 1.75 m (5 ft 9 in)
- Weight: Middleweight

Boxing career
- Reach: 178 cm (70 in)
- Stance: Orthodox

Boxing record
- Total fights: 31
- Wins: 21
- Win by KO: 13
- Losses: 7
- Draws: 3
Medal record
Representing Russia
Men's boxing
Boxing World Cup
Bronze medal – third place	Moscow 2008	Middleweight

Dmitry Aleksandrovich Chudinov (Russian: Дми́трий Алекса́ндрович Чуди́нов; born 15 September 1986) is a Russian professional boxer who held the WBA interim middleweight title from 2013 to 2015. His younger brother, Fedor Chudinov, is also a professional boxer.

== Professional career ==
Chudinov started his career with a first-round TKO of Otis Chennault at the Reno Events Center in Reno, Nevada. He defeated Juan Camilo Novoa on December 21, 2013 to win the WBA interim Middleweight title.

== Professional boxing record ==
31 fights; 21 wins (13 knockouts), 7 loss, 3 draws
Res.	Record	Opponent	Type	Rd., Time	Date	Location	Notes
Loss	21–7–3	(United Kingdom) Germaine Brown	UD	8	2020-10-15	(Belarus) Falcon Club, Minsk	
Loss	21–6–3	(France) Louis Toutin	TKO	2 (8)	2019-07-20	(France) Palais des Sports, Marseille	
Draw	21–5–3	(Germany) Armenak Hovhannisyan	TD	2 (10)	2019-05-25	(Germany) Salzgitter	For WBC Asian Boxing Council Light Heavyweight title.
Loss	21–5–2	(Poland) Robert Parzęczewski	KO	2 (10)	2019-04-06	(Poland) Spodek, Katowice	For vacant Republic of Poland International Super Middleweight title.
Loss	21–4–2	(United Kingdom) Patrick Mendy	UD	8	2018-11-24	(Denmark) Frederiksberghallen, Copenhagen	
Loss	21–3–2	(Uzbekistan) Azizbek Abdugofurov	UD	12	2018-05-05	(Uzbekistan) Sport Palace "Uzbekiston", Tashkent	For vacant WBC Silver Super Middleweight title.
Win	21–2–2	(Belarus) Siarhei Khamitski	UD	8	2018-02-24	(Germany) Arena Nürnberger Versicherung, Nuremberg	
Loss	20–2–2	(Denmark) Lolenga Mock	UD	10	2018-01-05	(Denmark) Frederiksberg Hallerne, Copenhagen	
Win	20–1–2	(Hungary) Zoltan Papp	TKO	1 (8)	2017–02–04	(Russia) Dynamo Palace of Sports in Krylatskoye, Moscow	
Win	19–1–2	(Latvia) Andrejs Pokumeiko	UD	8	2016–07–31	(Latvia) Arena Riga, Riga	
Win	18–1–2	(Russia) Marat Khuzeev	TKO	2 (8), 2:18	2016–02–13	(Russia) Boxing & Gym Academy, Moscow	
Win	17–1–2	(Germany) Benjamin Simon	TKO	4 (8), 1:32	2015–12–12	(Russia) VTB Arena, Moscow	
Win	16–1–2	(Belarus) Siarhei Krapshyla	TKO	4 (8), 2:00	2015–10–28	(Russia) Volta Club, Moscow	
Win	15–1–2	(Serbia) Geard Ajetović	UD	8	2015–08–23	(Russia) Rixos Mriya Resort Hotel, Yalta, Crimea	
Loss	14–1–2	(United Kingdom) Chris Eubank Jr.	TKO	12 (12), 2:11	2015–03–28	(United Kingdom) The O2 Arena, Greenwich, London	Lost interim WBA Middleweight title.
Win	14–0–2	(France) Mehdi Bouadla	TKO	3 (12), 1:15	2014–08–09	(Ukraine) Open Air Bike Show, Sevastopol	Retained interim WBA Middleweight title.
Win	13–0–2	(Denmark) Patrick Nielsen	UD	12	2014–06–01	(Russia) Mytishchi Arena, Mytishchi	Retained interim WBA Middleweight title.
Win	12–0–2	(Colombia) Juan Camilo Novoa	TKO	6 (12), 2:55	2013–12–21	(Russia) Krylatskoe Sport Palace, Moscow	Won vacant interim WBA Middleweight title.
Win	11–0–2	(United Kingdom) Max Maxwell	PTS	8	2013–09–21	(United Kingdom) Copper Box, Hackney Wick, London	
Win	10–0–2	(Venezuela) Jorge Navarro	KO	2 (12), 2:59	2013–08–24	(Russia) Open Air Bike Show, Volgograd	Won vacant WBA International Middleweight title.
Draw	9–0–2	(The Gambia) Patrick Mendy	PTS	8	2013–07–20	(United Kingdom) Wembley Arena, Wembley, London	
Win	9–0–1	(United States) Grady Brewer	RTD	3 (12), 3:00	2013–05–17	(Russia) Crocus City Hall, Myakinino	Retained interim PABA Middleweight title.
Win	8–0–1	(Colombia) Milton Núñez	KO	1 (12), 2:50	2013–03–08	(Russia) Krylia Sovetov, Moscow	Won interim PABA Middleweight title.
Win	7–0–1	(Colombia) Jhonatan Ricar	KO	2 (8), 1:07	2012–12–17	(Russia) Crocus City Hall, Myakinino	
Draw	6–0–1	(United States) Paul Mendez	MD	6	2012–03–03	(United States) Woodland Community Senior Center, Woodland, California	
Win	6–0	(United States) Tony Hirsch	MD	6	2011–12–16	(United States) Woodland Community Senior Center, Woodland, California	
Win	5–0	(United States) Nathan Bedwell	TKO	3 (4), 0:18	2010–06–03	(United States) Commerce Casino, Commerce, California	
Win	4–0	(United States) Fernando Calleros	UD	4	2010–03–25	(United States) Commerce Casino, Commerce, California	
Win	3–0	(United States) Flavio Cardoza	TKO	1 (4), 1:46	2009–12–17	(United States) Commerce Casino, Commerce, California	
Win	2–0	(United States) Eddie Hunter	UD	4	2009–08–22	(United States) Pala Casino Resort and Spa, Pala, California	
Win	1–0	(United States) Otis Chennault	TKO	1 (4), 0:40	2009–07–10	(United States) Reno Events Center, Reno, Nevada	Professional Debut.

Achievements
Regional boxing titles
Vacant Title last held by Mehdi Bouadla	WBA International middleweight champion August 24 – December 21, 2013; Won interim world title	Vacant Title next held by Jarrod Fletcher
World boxing titles
Vacant Title last held by Martin Murray	WBA Middleweight Interim Champion; December 21, 2013 – February 28, 2015	Succeeded by Chris Eubank Jr.
