= Fiodor Czerkaszyn =

Ukrainian-Polish boxer (born 1996)

Personal information
- Born: Fedir Cherkashyn; January 11, 1996 (age 30) Kharkiv, Ukraine
- Height: 6 ft 1 in (185 cm)
- Weight: Middleweight

Boxing career
- Reach: 72 in (183 cm)
- Stance: Orthodox

Boxing record
- Total fights: 30
- Wins: 29
- Win by KO: 18
- Losses: 1
- No contests: 0

Fiodor Czerkaszyn (Ukrainian: Федір Черкашин) is a Ukrainian-Polish professional boxer. He is currently ranked sixth by WBC, and eighteenth by BoxRec.

== Professional career ==
Czerkaszyn made his professional debut on 9 May 2015, scoring a unanimous decision (UD) victory over Konstantin Aleksandrov at the Gymnasium of Natural Sciences and Mathematics in Vratsa, Bulgaria. All three judges scored the bout 60–54 in favor of Czerkaszyn.

On 26 October 2024, Czerkaszyn would receive his first title shot in a bout for the vacant WBC international middleweight championship against Sebastian Horacio Papeschi in Zakopane, Poland. Czerkaszyn won fight via unanimous decision (UD). All three judges scored the bout 100–90.

== Professional boxing record ==
30 fights	29 wins	1 loss
By knockout	18	0
By decision	11	1

No.	Result	Record	Opponent	Type	Round, time	Date	Location	Notes
30	Win	29–1	Oscar Diaz	UD	10	24 Oct 2026	Nosalowy Dwór, Zakopane, Poland	
29	Win	28–1	Mate Rudan	TKO	5 (8), 0:37	16 May 2026	Centrum Kultury Śląskiej, Świętochłowice, Poland	
28	Win	27–1	Jhony Navarrete	KO	1 (8), 1:26	22 Nov 2025	Gimnasio Sergio Maldonado Cota, Hermosillo, Mexico	
27	Win	26–1	Patrick Allotey	TKO	2 (8), 1:50	1 Feb 2025	Prudential Center, Newark, New Jersey, U.S.	
26	Win	25–1	Sebastian Horacio Papeschi	UD	10	26 Oct 2024	Nosalowy Dwór, Zakopane, Poland	Won vacant WBC international middleweight title
25	Win	24–1	Jorge Cota	TKO	7 (10), 2:52	24 May 2024	Hala Podpromie, Rzeszów, Poland	
24	Win	23–1	Jairo Delgado	UD	8	24 Feb 2024	Opera i Filharmonia Podlaska, Białystok, Poland	
23	Loss	22–1	Anauel Ngamissengue	MD	8	26 Aug 2023	Stadion Wrocław, Wrocław, Poland	
22	Win	22–0	Elias Espadas	TKO	9 (10), 2:07	22 Apr 2023	T-Mobile Arena, Paradise, Nevada, U.S.	
21	Win	21–0	Nathaniel Gallimore	UD	10	5 Nov 2022	Minneapolis Armory, Minneapolis, Minnesota, U.S.	
20	Win	20–0	Gilbert Venegas Jr.	TKO	4 (8), 2:19	20 Aug 2022	Seminole Hard Rock Hotel & Casino, Hollywood, Florida, U.S.	
19	Win	19–0	Gonzalo Gaston Coria	UD	10	23 Oct 2021	Nosalowy Dwór, Zakopane, Poland	
18	Win	18–0	Damian Ezequiel Bonelli	TKO	1 (8), 2:50	17 Jul 2021	Arena Suwałki, Suwałki, Poland	
17	Win	17–0	Javier Francisco Maciel	UD	10	27 Mar 2021	Hotel Warszawianka, Jachranka, Poland	
16	Win	16–0	Patrick Mendy	KO	7 (8), 1:58	7 Mar 2020	Hala Sportowa im. Olimpijczyków, Łomża, Poland	
15	Win	15–0	Mathias Eklund	TKO	3 (8), 2:41	30 Nov 2019	Nosalowy Dwór, Zakopane, Poland	
14	Win	14–0	Guido Nicolas Pitto	TKO	1 (10), 2:47	26 Oct 2019	Hala Sportowa, Sosnowiec, Poland	
13	Win	13–0	Wes Capper	UD	10	6 Jul 2019	Stadion Miejski, Rzeszów, Poland	
12	Win	12–0	Kassim Ouma	TKO	2 (8), 2:10	23 Mar 2019	Hala Sportowa im. Olimpijczyków, Łomża, Poland	
11	Win	11–0	Bartłomiej Grafka	UD	8	6 Oct 2018	Nosalowy Dwór, Zakopane, Poland	
10	Win	10–0	Ayoub Nefzi	TKO	2 (8), 0:14	2 Jun 2018	G2A Arena, Rzeszów, Poland	
9	Win	9–0	Daniel Urbański	KO	1 (8), 0:17	12 May 2018	Hala Sportowa, Wałcz, Poland	
8	Win	8–0	Artem Karasev	KO	1 (4), 1:26	10 Feb 2018	Hala Nysa, Nysa, Poland	
7	Win	7–0	Nadzir Bakshyieu	RTD	4 (6), 3:00	20 Feb 2016	KIKO Boxing Club, Kyiv, Ukraine	
6	Win	6–0	Anton Rusak	PTS	6	21 Dec 2015	"Gagarin" Club, Minsk, Belarus	
5	Win	5–0	Victor Garcia	UD	6	2 Oct 2015	Gymnase du Lycee Technique de Monaco, Monte Carlo, Monaco	
4	Win	4–0	Yuriy Tkachenko	RTD	5 (6), 3:00	31 Jul 2015	Imperia Sports Complex, Pidhirtsi, Ukraine	
3	Win	3–0	Mikalai Shaplou	TKO	1 (6)	10 Jul 2015	Royal Boxing Gym, Minsk, Belarus	
2	Win	2–0	Oleksandr Kovaliov	KO	1 (4), 0:48	21 May 2015	Army Sports Club, Kyiv, Ukraine	
1	Win	1–0	Konstantin Aleksandrov	UD	6	9 May 2015	Gymnasium of Natural Sciences and Mathematics, Vratsa, Bulgaria	
