= Francis Cheka =

Tanzanian boxer (born 1982)

- Born: April 15, 1982 (age 43); Dar es Salaam, Tanzania
- Statistics
- Weight(s): Super Middleweight
- Height: 5 ft 10.5 in (1.79 m)
- Boxing record
- Total fights: 49
- Wins: 34
- Wins by KO: 18
- Losses: 13
- Draws: 2

Francis Cheka (born Francis Boniface Cheka on April 15, 1982 in Dar es Salaam, Tanzania) is a Tanzanian professional boxer and Cheka resides in Morogoro, Tanzania.

== Professional boxing record ==
49 fights	34 wins	13 losses
By knockout	18	8
By decision	15	5
By disqualification	1	0
Draws	2	

No.	Result	Record	Opponent	Type	Round, time	Date	Location	Notes
49	Loss	34–13–2	(Tanzania) Dulla Mbabe	KO	6 (12), 1:28	26 Dec 2018	PTA Saba Saba, Dar es Salaam, Tanzania	
48	Win	34–12–2	(Tanzania) Juma Rashid	KO	2 (8)	12 May 2018	Jamhuri Stadium, Dodoma, Tanzania	
47	Loss	33–12–2	(Poland) Dariusz Sęk	TKO	3 (8), 2:56	21 Oct 2017	Kopalnia Soli, Wieliczka, Poland	
46	Loss	33–11–2	(Bosnia and Herzegovina) Enes Zecirevic	UD	8	24 Jun 2017	Salle de Fetes, Le Lignon, Switzerland	
45	Win	33–10–2	(Tanzania) Said Mbelwa	DQ	6 (10)	6 May 2017	Jamhuri Stadium, Morogoro, Tanzania	Vacant UBO African super middleweight title at stake; Mbelwa DQ-ed for biting Cheka in the 6th round
44	Loss	32–10–2	(India) Vijender Singh	TKO	3 (10), 1:36	17 Dec 2016	Thyagaraj Stadium, New Delhi, India	For WBO Asia Pacific super middleweight title
43	Win	32–9–2	(Serbia) Geard Ajetović	UD	12	27 Feb 2016	Leaders Club Kinodoni, Dar es Salaam, Tanzania	Won vacant WBF (Federation) Inter-Continental super middleweight title
42	Loss	31–9–2	(Tanzania) Thomas Mashali	UD	10	25 Dec 2015	Jamhuri Stadium, Morogoro, Tanzania	
41	Win	31–8–2	(Thailand) Kiatchai Singwancha	TKO	8 (10)	30 May 2015	PTA Hall, Dar es Salaam, Tanzania	
40	Draw	30–8–2	(Iran) Sajad Mehrabi	MD	8	19 Apr 2014	PTA Hall, Dar es Salaam, Tanzania	
39	Loss	30–8–1	(Russia) Fedor Chudinov	RTD	3 (6), 3:00	21 Dec 2013	Dynamo Palace of Sports in Krylatskoye, Moscow, Russia	
38	Win	30–7–1	(United States) Phil Williams	UD	12	30 Aug 2013	Diamond Jubilee Hall, Dar es Salaam, Tanzania	Won vacant WBF (Federation) super middleweight title
37	Win	29–7–1	(Malawi) Chimwewe Chiotchi	UD	8	10 Aug 2013	Jamhuri Stadium, Morogoro, Tanzania	
36	Win	28–7–1	(Tanzania) Thomas Mashali	KO	10 (12), 2:35	1 May 2013	PTA Hall, Dar es Salaam, Tanzania	Retained IBF African super middleweight title
35	Loss	27–7–1	(Turkey) Uensal Arik	TKO	7 (12), 0:15	22 Mar 2013	Universal Hall, Berlin, Germany	For vacant IBF Inter-Continental super middleweight title
34	Win	27–6–1	(Malawi) Chimwemwe Chiotcha	SD	12	27 Dec 2012	Sheikh Amri Abeid Memorial Stadium, Arusha Tanzania	Retained IBF African super middleweight title
33	Win	26–6–1	(Tanzania) Karama Nyilawila	TKO	6 (12)	29 Sep 2012	PTA Hall, Dar es Salaam, Tanzania	Won vacant UBO International super middleweight title
32	Win	25–6–1	(Tanzania) Mada Maugo	RTD	6 (12), 3:00	28 Apr 2012	PTA Hall, Dar es Salaam, Tanzania	Won vacant IBF African super middleweight title
31	Win	24–6–1	(Tanzania) Karama Nyilawila	UD	10	28 Jan 2012	Jamhuri Stadium, Morogoro, Tanzania	
30	Win	23–6–1	(Tanzania) Mada Maugo	MD	10	1 Sep 2011	Jamhuri Stadium, Morogoro, Tanzania	
29	Win	22–6–1	(Kenya) Daniel Wanyonyi	UD	10	25 Jun 2011	Jamhuri Stadium, Morogoro, Tanzania	
28	Win	21–6–1	(Tanzania) Mada Maugo	MD	8	1 Jan 2011	PTA Hall, Dar es Salaam, Tanzania	
27	Win	20–6–1	(Uganda) Muhamad Sebyala	UD	12	11 Sep 2010	Jamhuri Stadium, Morogoro, Tanzania	Retained UBO Inter-Continental middleweight title
26	Win	19–6–1	(Brazil) Isak Tavares	KO	2 (12)	19 Dec 2009	PTA Hall, Dar es Salaam, Tanzania	Retained UBO Inter-Continental middleweight title
25	Win	18–6–1	(Tanzania) Japhet Kaseba	TKO	9 (12), 2:06	2 Oct 2009	Uhuru Stadium, Dar es Salaam, Tanzania	
24	Win	17–6–1	(Azerbaijan) Ramil Nadirov	RTD	1 (12), 3:00	30 May 2009	Mkwakwani Stadium, Tanga, Tanzania	Retained (Certainly) UBO Inter-Continental middleweight title
23	Win	16–6–1	(Tanzania) Rashid Matumla	UD	12	13 Feb 2009	Jamhuri Stadium, Morogoro, Tanzania	
22	Win	15–6–1	(Kenya) Joseph Odhiambo	KO	1 (8), 2:46	13 Dec 2008	Vijana Social Hall, Morogoro, Tanzania	
21	Loss	14–6–1	(England) Matthew Macklin	PTS	10	6 Sep 2008	M.E.N Arena, Manchester, England	
20	Win	14–5–1	(Tanzania) Hassan Matumla	KO	10 (12)	1 Mar 2008	Diamond Jubilee Hall, Dar es Salaam, Tanzania	Won vacant UBO Inter-Continental middleweight title
19	Loss	13–5–1	(Serbia) Geard Ajetović	PTS	8	8 Feb 2008	Peterlee Leisure Centre, Peterlee, England	
18	Loss	13–4–1	(England) Paul Smith	PTS	8	8 Dec 2007	Bolton Arena, Bolton, England	
17	Win	13–3–1	(Tanzania) Rashid Matumla	UD	10	3 Nov 2007	Temeke Luxury Pub, Dar es Salaam, Tanzania	
16	Win	12–3–1	(Tanzania) Mbaruku Kheri	KO	3 (10)	1 Jun 2007	New Msasani Club, Dar es Salaam, Tanzania	
15	Win	11–3–1	(Tanzania) Mbwana Ally	TKO	2 (10)	31 Mar 2006	DDC Hall, Morogoro, Tanzania	
14	Loss	10–3–1	(Germany) Robert Stieglitz	TKO	5 (12), 2:30	9 Jul 2005	Life Sportaprk Herrenkrug, Magdeburg, Germany	For IBF Inter-Continental super middleweight title
13	Win	10–2–1	(Zambia) Tom Chishala	UD	10	19 Sep 2004	Diamond Jubilee Hall, Dar es Salaam, Tanzania	
12	Win	9–2–1	(Tanzania) Rashid Matumla	UD	10	25 Apr 2004	PTA Hall, Dar es Salaam, Tanzania	
11	Win	8–2–1	(Tanzania) Omary Singine	TKO	3 (?)	30 Aug 2003	Morogoro, Tanzania	
10	Loss	7–2–1	(Tanzania) Bagaza Mwambene	TKO	3 (8)	6 Apr 2003	Amana Hall, Dar es Salaam, Tanzania	
9	Loss	7–1–1	(Tanzania) Rashid Matumla	TKO	3 (10)	23 Jan 2003	Dar es Salaam, Tanzania	
8	Win	7–0–1	(Tanzania) Maneno Oswald	PTS	8	27 Oct 2002	Dar es Salaam, Tanzania	
7	Win	6–0–1	(Tanzania) Maneno Oswald	PTS	8	8 Aug 2002	Morogoro, Tanzania	
6	Win	5–0–1	(Tanzania) Alphonse Nelstory Kagobe	TKO	6 (?)	28 Apr 2001	Morogoro, Tanzania	
5	Win	4–0–1	(Tanzania) Matimbwa Ally	KO	3 (?)	26 Feb 2001	Morogoro, Tanzania	
4	Win	3–0–1	(Tanzania) Salum China	KO	2 (?)	10 Oct 2000	Morogoro, Tanzania	
3	Win	2–0–1	(Tanzania) Yusuph Jibaba	KO	1 (?)	16 Aug 2000	Dar es Salaam, Tanzania	
2	Draw	1–0–1	(Tanzania) Abuu Nyenze	PTS	8	12 Jun 2000	Dar es Salaam, Tanzania	
1	Win	1–0	(Tanzania) Mbwana Ally	KO	2 (4)	26 Feb 2000	Dar es Salaam, Tanzania	

== See also ==
- Bruno Tarimo
- Goodluck Mrema
- Rashid Matumla
- Hassan Mwakinyo

Achievements
Vacant Title last held by Marco Antonio Rubio	WBF Super Middleweight Champion; August 30, 2013 – present	Incumbent
Preceded by Francis Cheka	IBF Continental Africa; Super Middleweight Champion; May 01, 2013 – present	Incumbent
Preceded by Francis Cheka	IBF Continental Africa; Super Middleweight Champion; December 27, 2012 – May 01, 2013	Succeeded by Francis Cheka
Vacant Title last held by Joseph Marwa	IBF Continental Africa; Super Middleweight Champion; April 28, 2012 – December 27, 2012	Succeeded by Francis Cheka
