= Robert Parzęczewski =

Polish boxer (born 1993)

Personal information
- Nicknames: Arab; Mr. KO
- Born: 27 October 1993 (age 32) Częstochowa, Poland
- Height: 6 ft 1 in (185 cm)
- Weight: Super Middleweight; Light Heavyweight

Boxing career
- Reach: 75 in (191 cm)
- Stance: Orthodox

Boxing record
- Total fights: 37
- Wins: 35
- Win by KO: 20
- Losses: 2
- Draws: 0
- No contests: 0

Robert Marek Parzęczewski (born 27 October 1993) is a Polish professional boxer.

== Professional career ==
Parzęczewski made his professional debut on March 23, 2013, against Piotr Tomaszek. Parzęczewski won the fight via a Unanimous Decision.

In only his third professional fight, Parzęczewski fought for his first career championship. He faced Zoltan Kiss Jr. for the vacant Republic of Poland Youth International super middleweight title on April 12, 2014. Parzęczewski won the fight via a second-round TKO, winning his first career championship.

After two wins, he faced Ruslan Rodzivich on October 25, 2014, for the vacant WBF (Foundation) International light heavyweight title. Parzęczewski won the fight via a third-round TKO, winning his second career championship.

After another two wins, he faced Jessy Luxembourger on June 19, 2015. Parzęczewski lost the fight via a Unanimous Decision, suffering his first career defeat.

Following his loss, he would go on a seven-fight win streak. He then faced Zura Mekereshvili on May 13, 2017, for the vacant WBO Youth light heavyweight title. Parzęczewski won the fight via a Unanimous Decision, winning his third career championsip.

His next fight came on September 30, 2017, against Tomas Adamek for the vacant Republic of Poland International light heavyweight title. Parzęczewski won the fight via a fifth-round TKO, winning his fourth career championship.

After a win over Said Mbelwa, he faced Andrzej Soldra on March 24, 2018, for the vacant Republic of Poland light heavyweight title. Parzęczewski won the fight via a first-round TKO, winning his fifth career championship.

After two non-title fights against Tim Cronin and Jackson dos Santos, He faced Dariusz Sęk on December 22, 2018, in his first title defense. Parzęczewski won the fight via a second-round TKO, successfully defending his championship.

His next fight came on April 6, 2019, against Dmitry Chudinov for the vacant Republic of Poland International super middleweight title. Parzęczewski won the fight via a second-round TKO, winning his sixth career championship.

His first title defense came on October 4, 2019, against Patrick Mendy. Parzęczewski won the fight via a Unanimous Decision, successfully defending his championship.

After a win over Sladan Janjanin, he faced Sherzod Husanov on September 26, 2020. Parzęczewski lost the fight via a second-round TKO, losing his second professional fight.

Following his loss, he faced Facundo Nicolas Galovar on March 19, 2021. Parzęczewski won the fight via a Unanimous Decision.

In his next fight, he faced Sahan Aybay on September 24, 2021, for the vacant Republic of Poland International super middleweight title. Parzęczewski won the fight via a fifth-round TKO, winning his seventh career championship.

His first title defense came on November 26, 2021, against Taras Holovashchenko. Parzęczewski won the fight via a Majority Decision, successfully defending his championship.

After going on a seven fight winning streak, he faced Luca D'Ortenzi on May 22, 2026, for the vacant European light heavyweight title. Parzęczewski lost the fight via an eleventh-round TKO, failing to win the championship.

== Professional boxing record ==
38 fights	35 wins	3 losses
By knockout	20	2
By decision	15	1

No.	Result	Record	Opponent	Type	Round, time	Date	Location	Notes
38	Loss	35–3	Luca D'Ortenzi	TKO	11 (12), 0:40	22 May 2026	Palasport, Guidonia Montecelio, Italy	For vacant European light heavyweight title
37	Win	35–2	Oleksandr Antonov	UD	10	18 Oct 2025	Hala Sportowa Przy Szkole Podstawowej nr 2, Ostrzeszów, Poland	
36	Win	34–2	Robert Racz	UD	10	10 May 2025	Miejska Hala Sportowa, Radomsko, Poland	
35	Win	33–2	Carlos Alberto Lamela	UD	10	30 Nov 2024	Hala Sportowa ul. Słoneczna 5, Dziadowa Kłoda, Poland	
34	Win	32–2	Adrian Valentin	KO	5 (10), 0:30	15 Mar 2024	Hala Osrodka Sportu i Rekreacji, ul. Strumykowa 1, Dzierżoniów, Poland	
33	Win	31–2	Kasim Gashi	KO	2 (10), 0:58	29 Sep 2023	Miejska Hala Sportowa, Radomsko, Poland	
32	Win	30–2	Nuhu Lawal	TKO	6 (10), 0:47	10 Mar 2023	Hala Osrodka Sportu i Rekreacji, ul. Strumykowa 1, Dzierżoniów, Poland	
31	Win	29–2	Tomasz Gromadzki	UD	10	17 Sep 2022	Miejska Hala Sportowa, Radomsko, Poland	
30	Win	28–2	Taras Holovashchenko	MD	10	26 Nov 2021	Miejska Hala Sportowa, Radomsko, Poland	Retained Republic of Poland International super middleweight title
29	Win	27–2	Sahan Aybay	TKO	5 (10), 2:59	24 Sep 2021	Hala Sportowa, ul. Obrzycka 88, Oborniki, Poland	Won vacant Republic of Poland International super middleweight title
28	Win	26–2	Facundo Nicolas Galovar	UD	8	19 Mar 2021	Hala sp nr 1 im. Tadeusza Kosciuszki, Szklarska Poręba, Poland	
27	Loss	25–2	Sherzod Husanov	TKO	2 (10), 2:59	26 Sep 2020	Hala Sportowa, Częstochowa, Poland	
26	Win	25–1	Sladan Janjanin	UD	8	20 Jun 2020	Hotel Arłamów, Arłamów, Poland	
25	Win	24–1	Patrick Mendy	UD	10	4 Oct 2019	Hala Sportowa, Częstochowa, Poland	Retained Republic of Poland International super middleweight title
24	Win	23–1	Dmitry Chudinov	TKO	2 (10), 1:45	6 Apr 2019	Spodek, Katowice, Poland	Won vacant Republic of Poland International super middleweight title
23	Win	22–1	Dariusz Sęk	TKO	2 (10), 2:35	22 Dec 2018	Hala MOSiR, Radom, Poland	Retained Republic of Poland light heavyweight title
22	Win	21–1	Jackson dos Santos	TKO	1 (8), 0:48	19 May 2018	Ptak Warsaw Expo, Nadarzyn, Poland	
21	Win	20–1	Tim Cronin	TKO	8 (8), 2:42	21 Apr 2018	Hala Sportowa, Częstochowa, Poland	
20	Win	19–1	Andrzej Soldra	TKO	1 (10), 2:44	24 Mar 2018	Hala Osrodka Sportu i Rekreacji, ul. Strumykowa 1, Dzierżoniów, Poland	Won vacant Republic of Poland light heavyweight title
19	Win	18–1	Said Mbelwa	TKO	3 (8), 1:51	18 Nov 2017	Hala Sportowa, Częstochowa, Poland	
18	Win	17–1	Tomas Adamek	TKO	5 (10), 2:03	30 Sep 2017	Hala ICDS, Łomianki, Poland	Won vacant Republic of Poland International light heavyweight title
17	Win	16–1	Zura Mekereshvili	UD	10	13 May 2017	Hala Sportowa, Częstochowa, Poland	Won vacant WBO Youth light heavyweight title
16	Win	15–1	Tomasz Gargula	TKO	4 (8), 0:34	4 Mar 2017	Hala Osrodka Sportu i Rekreacji, ul. Strumykowa 1, Dzierżoniów, Poland	
15	Win	14–1	Beka Aduashvili	KO	4 (8), 1:08	24 Sep 2016	Arena Kalisz, Kalisz, Poland	
14	Win	13–1	Attila Palko	KO	1 (6), 1:25	28 Aug 2016	Hala Sportowa, Częstochowa, Poland	
13	Win	12–1	Michał Graszek	TKO	1 (10), 0:42	18 Jun 2016	Szydłowiec Castle, Szydłowiec, Poland	
12	Win	11–1	Eryk Ciesłowski	TKO	2 (6), 1:14	14 May 2016	Hala Azoty, Kędzierzyn-Koźle, Poland	
11	Win	10–1	Bela Juhasz	UD	6	19 Dec 2015	Hala ICDS, Łomianki, Poland	
10	Win	9–1	Bartosz Szwarczyński	TKO	1 (8), 1:27	5 Sep 2015	Thunder Gym, Tczew, Poland	
9	Loss	8–1	Jessy Luxembourger	UD	8	19 Jun 2015	Hala KSZO, Ostrowiec Świętokrzyski, Poland	
8	Win	8–0	Farouk Daku	UD	8	14 Mar 2015	Cuprum Arena, Lubin, Poland	
7	Win	7–0	Andrei Salakhutdzinau	UD	6	12 Dec 2014	Hala MOSiR, Radom, Poland	
6	Win	6–0	Ruslan Rodzivich	TKO	3 (8), 0:37	25 Oct 2014	Hala Sportowa, Częstochowa, Poland	WBF (Foundation) International light heavyweight title
5	Win	5–0	Ivan Stupalo	UD	8	28 Jun 2014	Hala Podpromie, Rzeszów, Poland	
4	Win	4–0	Ericles Torres Marin	TKO	4 (4), 2:42	26 Apr 2014	Galeria Korona, Kielce, Poland	
3	Win	3–0	Zoltan Kiss	TKO	2 (6), 1:15	12 Apr 2014	Hala Sportowa, Częstochowa, Poland	Won vacant Republic of Poland Youth International super middleweight title
2	Win	2–0	Siarhei Krapshyla	UD	4	8 Feb 2014	Hala Sportowa, ul. Sosnowa 3, Pionki, Poland	
1	Win	1–0	Piotr Tomaszek	UD	4	23 Mar 2013	Hala Sportowa, Częstochowa, Poland	
