= Juho Haapoja =

Finnish boxer

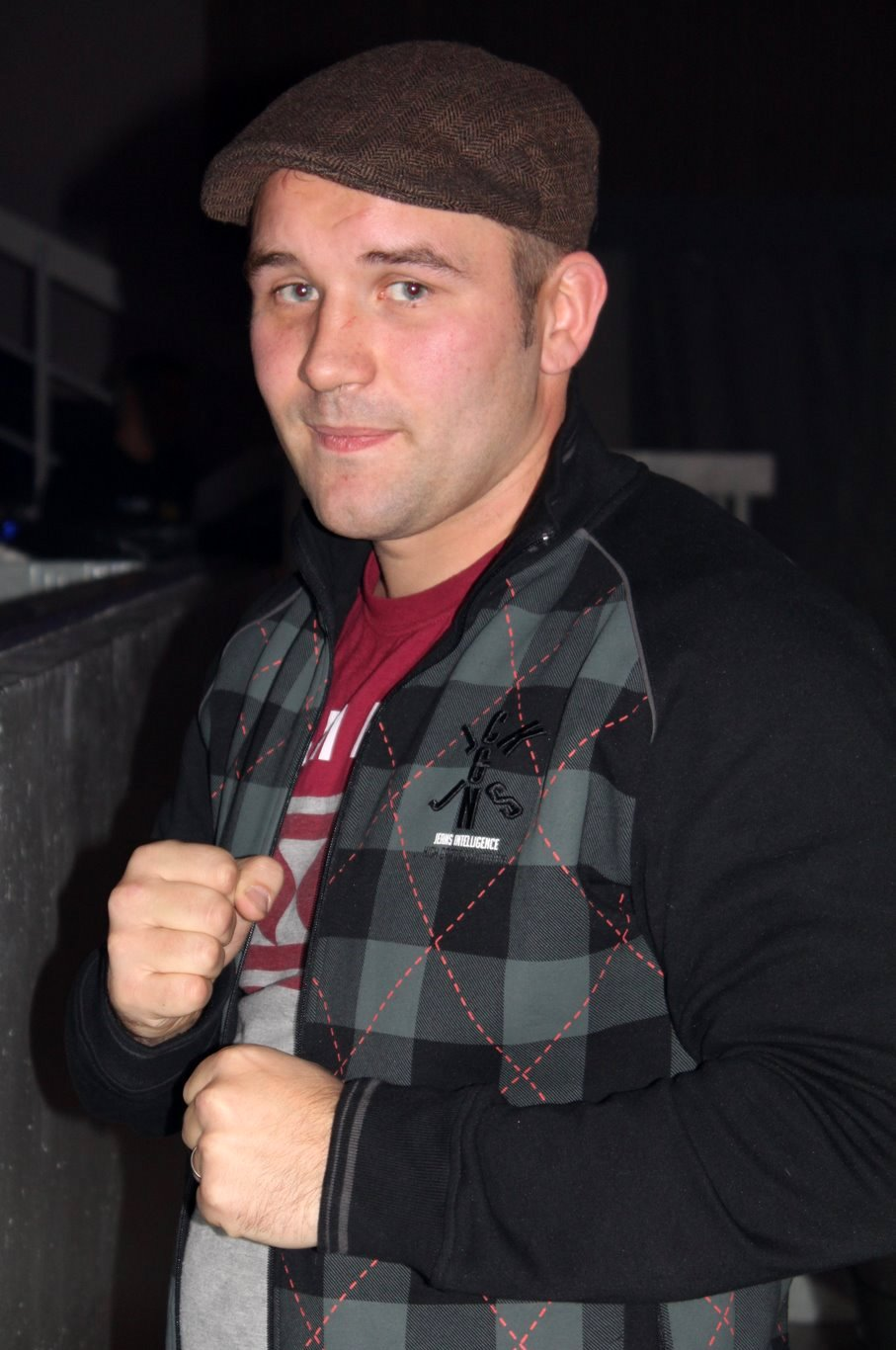
- Haapoja in 2009

Personal information
- Nicknames: Härmän Häjy ("Knife-fighter from Härmä")
- Nationality: Finnish
- Born: 22 October 1980 (age 45) Ylihärmä, Finland
- Height: 1.82 m (6 ft 0 in)
- Weight: Cruiserweight; Heavyweight

Boxing career
- Stance: Orthodox

Boxing record
- Total fights: 38
- Wins: 28
- Win by KO: 16
- Losses: 7
- Draws: 2
- No contests: 1

Juho Haapoja (born 22 October 1980) is a Finnish former professional boxer who competed from 2006 to 2017, and held the European Union cruiserweight title twice between 2011 and 2017.

== Professional career ==
Haapoja made his professional debut on 8 April 2006, losing a four-round points decision to Remigijus Ziausys, who also debuted. A ten-round split draw against Jari Markkanen on 16 March 2007 denied Haapoja a chance to win the Finnish heavyweight title. He lost for a second time to Denis Bakhtov on 22 May 2008, which was for a WBC and PABA regional heavyweight title. On 28 November 2008, Haapoja stopped Sami Elovaara in nine rounds to become the Finnish heavyweight champion, winning the vacant title in his second attempt. A defence of this title against Jarno Rosberg, which went the ten-round distance, was later relegated to a no contest after Rosberg was caught for steroids.

On 23 September 2011, Haapoja won his first major regional title by defeating Faisal Ibnel Arrami via unanimous decision (UD) to become the European Union cruiserweight champion. He made two successful defences against Ian Tims on 21 January 2012 (twelve-round unanimous decision) and Francesco Versaci on 15 September 2012 (fourth-round stoppage), but lost the title to Mateusz Masternak on 15 December 2012 (unanimous decision). Consecutive losses came against Silvio Branco on 6 July 2013 (tenth-round technical decision) and Rakhim Chakhkiyev on 15 March 2014 (ninth-round TKO), both times for the vacant WBC Silver cruiserweight title.

Haapoja suffered his sixth professional loss on 31 January 2015, when he was stopped in two rounds by Serhiy Demchenko. In a rematch against Demchenko on 23 May, the fight ended in a ten-round split draw. Haapoja won his second European Union cruiserweight title on 25 March 2017, scoring a UD over Damian Bruzzese. His first defence, on 21 October, was unsuccessful: after losing an SD to Alexandru Jur, Haapoja promptly announced his retirement from boxing.

== Professional boxing record ==
39 fights	28 wins	8 losses
By knockout	16	4
By decision	12	4
Draws	2	
No contests	1	

No.	Result	Record	Opponent	Type	Round, time	Date	Location	Notes
39	Loss	28–8–2 (1)	Alexandru Jur	SD	12	21 Oct 2017	PowerPark, Kauhava, Finland	Lost European Union cruiserweight title
38	Win	28–7–2 (1)	Damian Bruzzese	UD	12	25 Mar 2017	Töölö Sports Hall, Helsinki, Finland	Won vacant European Union cruiserweight title
37	Win	27–7–2 (1)	Tamas Lodi	UD	10	17 Sep 2016	Seinäjoki Areena, Seinäjoki, Finland	
36	Loss	26–7–2 (1)	Tamas Lodi	KO	3 (10), 1:04	2 Apr 2016	Hartwall Arena, Helsinki, Finland	
35	Win	26–6–2 (1)	Miguel Velozo	KO	7 (8), 2:48	19 Dec 2015	Hartwall Arena, Helsinki, Finland	
34	Draw	25–6–2 (1)	Serhiy Demchenko	SD	10	23 May 2015	PowerPark, Kauhava, Finland	
33	Win	25–6–1 (1)	Jevgēņijs Andrejevs	UD	6	11 Apr 2015	Tervahalli, Kemi, Finland	
32	Loss	24–6–1 (1)	Serhiy Demchenko	TKO	2 (10), 2:10	31 Jan 2015	PowerPark, Kauhava, Finland	
31	Win	24–5–1 (1)	Attila Palko	TKO	1 (6), 2:35	20 Sep 2014	Hartwall Arena, Helsinki, Finland	
30	Win	23–5–1 (1)	Jevgēņijs Andrejevs	UD	6	16 Aug 2014	Olavinlinna, Savonlinna, Finland	
29	Win	22–5–1 (1)	Frank White	TKO	5 (10), 2:50	7 Jun 2014	PowerPark, Kauhava, Finland	
28	Win	21–5–1 (1)	Łukasz Rusiewicz	UD	6	17 May 2014	Salohalli, Salo, Finland	
27	Loss	20–5–1 (1)	Rakhim Chakhkiyev	TKO	9 (12), 0:26	15 Mar 2014	Dynamo Sports Palace, Moscow, Russia	For vacant WBC Silver cruiserweight title
26	Loss	20–4–1 (1)	Silvio Branco	TD	10 (12)	6 Jul 2013	Stadio Tommaso Fattori, Civitavecchia, Italy	For vacant WBC Silver cruiserweight title; Unanimous TD: Branco cut from an accidental head clash
25	Win	20–3–1 (1)	Michele De Meo	TKO	1 (10), 2:34	20 Apr 2013	Pyynikin palloiluhalli, Tampere, Finland	
24	Win	19–3–1 (1)	Levan Jomardashvili	RTD	5 (6), 2:44	9 Mar 2013	Barona Areena, Espoo, Finland	
23	Loss	18–3–1 (1)	Mateusz Masternak	UD	12	15 Dec 2012	Nuremberg Arena, Nuremberg, Germany	For vacant European heavyweight title
22	Win	18–2–1 (1)	Francesco Versaci	RTD	4 (12), 0:01	15 Sep 2012	Seinäjoki Areena, Seinäjoki, Finland	Retained European Union heavyweight title
21	Win	17–2–1 (1)	Ian Tims	UD	12	21 Jan 2012	Seinäjoki Areena, Seinäjoki, Finland	Retained European Union heavyweight title
20	Win	16–2–1 (1)	Faisal Ibnel Arrami	UD	12	23 Sep 2011	Ice Hall, Helsinki, Finland	Won vacant European Union heavyweight title
19	Win	15–2–1 (1)	Roman Kracik	UD	10	21 May 2011	Seinäjoki Areena, Seinäjoki, Finland	
18	Win	14–2–1 (1)	Mantas Tarvydas	TKO	4 (8), 2:24	4 Mar 2011	Hartwall Arena, Helsinki, Finland	
17	Win	13–2–1 (1)	Zoltan Czekus	TKO	2 (8), 1:28	13 Nov 2010	Seinäjoki Areena, Seinäjoki, Finland	
16	Win	12–2–1 (1)	Antonio Pedro Quiganga	TKO	4 (6), 0:39	29 May 2010	Anssin Jussin Areena, Ylihärmä, Finland	
15	Win	11–2–1 (1)	Pāvels Dolgovs	UD	6	20 Mar 2010	Liikunta-kulttuuritalo, Juuka, Finland	
14	NC	10–2–1 (1)	Jarno Rosberg	SD	10	27 Nov 2009	Pyynikin palloiluhalli, Tampere, Finland	Finnish heavyweight title at stake; Originally SD win for Rosberg, later ruled NC after he failed a drug test
13	Win	10–2–1	Humberto Evora	SD	6	22 Aug 2009	The Circus, Helsinki, Finland	
12	Win	9–2–1	Stanislav Lukyanchikov	RTD	3 (6), 3:00	14 Mar 2009	Urheiluhalli, Kemi, Finland	
11	Win	8–2–1	Valeri Semiskur	TKO	2 (8), 1:40	21 Feb 2009	Rewell Center, Vaasa, Finland	Retained Baltic Boxing Union heavyweight title
10	Win	7–2–1	Sami Elovaara	TKO	9 (10)	28 Nov 2008	Hartwall Arena, Helsinki, Finland	Won vacant Finnish heavyweight title
9	Win	6–2–1	Jevgēņijs Stamburskis	TKO	1 (6), 2:54	30 Aug 2008	Metroauto-areena, Tampere, Finland	
8	Loss	5–2–1	Denis Bakhtov	KO	10 (12), 1:59	22 May 2008	Yubileyny Sports Palace, Saint Petersburg, Russia	For WBC Asian interim and vacant PABA heavyweight titles
7	Win	5–1–1	Daniil Peretyatko	SD	8	5 Apr 2008	Maapohjahalli, Vaasa, Finland	Won Baltic Boxing Union heavyweight title
6	Win	4–1–1	Yuri Lunev	TKO	3 (6), 1:28	2 Nov 2007	Anssin Jussin Areena, Ylihärmä, Finland	
5	Win	3–1–1	Oleg Agafonov	TKO	1 (6), 1:37	15 Sep 2007	Maapohjahalli, Vaasa, Finland	
4	Draw	2–1–1	Jari Markkanen	SD	10	16 Mar 2007	Kuopiohalli, Kuopio, Finland	For Finnish heavyweight title
3	Win	2–1	Sergey Bakin	TKO	4 (6), 1:42	1 Dec 2006	Urheiluhalli, Vaasa, Finland	
2	Win	1–1	Pavel Baryshnikov	UD	4	23 Sep 2006	Kylpylä, Ylihärmä, Finland	
1	Loss	0–1	Remigijus Žiaušys	PTS	4	8 Apr 2006	Ravintola Umpitunneli, Tornio, Finland	

Sporting positions
Regional boxing titles
Vacant Title last held by Jari Markkanen	Finnish heavyweight champion 28 November 2008 – 2011; Vacated	Vacant Title next held by Janne Katajisto
Vacant Title last held by Geoffrey Battelo	European Union cruiserweight champion 23 September 2011 – 15 December 2012; Failed to win European title	Vacant Title next held by Mirko Larghetti
Vacant Title last held by Geoffrey Battelo	European Union cruiserweight champion 25 March 2017 – 21 October 2017	Succeeded by Alexandru Jur
