= Serhiy Demchenko =

Ukrainian boxer (born 1979)

Personal information
- Nationality: Ukrainian
- Born: 27 September 1979 (age 46) Sumy, Ukrainian SSR, Soviet Union
- Height: 1.84 m (6 ft 0 in)
- Weight: Super-middleweight; Light-heavyweight

Boxing career
- Stance: Orthodox

Boxing record
- Total fights: 37
- Wins: 22
- Win by KO: 15
- Losses: 14
- Draws: 1

Serhiy Demchenko (born 27 September 1979) is a Ukrainian professional boxer. He held the European Union light-heavyweight title twice between 2016 and 2018, and has challenged twice for the European light-heavyweight title.

== Professional career ==
Based in Rome throughout his career, Demchenko made his professional debut on 1 October 2005, scoring a first-round knockout against Karoly Gyorfi. On 10 May 2008, Demchenko won his first regional championship—the IBF Inter-Continental light-heavyweight title—by stopping Drago Janjusevic in four rounds. In his first attempt at winning the European Union light-heavyweight title, Demchenko lost a unanimous decision to Mehdi Amar on 17 October 2015. He found better success in his second attempt, on 12 March 2016, when he stopped Mirco Ricci in ten rounds to win the title.

== Professional boxing record ==
31 fights	18 wins	12 losses
By knockout	12	1
By decision	6	11
Draws	1	

No.	Result	Record	Opponent	Type	Round, time	Date	Location	Notes
31	Loss	18–12–1	Dominic Bösel	UD	12	3 Mar 2018	Stadthalle, Weißenfels, Germany	For vacant European light-heavyweight title
30	Win	18–11–1	Hakim Zoulikha	TD	5 (12)	18 May 2017	Cirque d'hiver, Paris, France	Won European Union light-heavyweight title; Split TD after Demchenko was cut from an accidental head clash
29	Win	17–11–1	Bojan Radovic	UD	6	28 Jan 2017	Polideportivo Fernando Martín, Fuenlabrada, Spain	
28	Loss	16–11–1	Mickael Diallo	PTS	10	17 Dec 2016	Stade de l'Est, Saint-Denis, France	
27	Loss	16–10–1	Mehdi Amar	UD	12	27 May 2016	Cirque d'hiver, Paris, France	For vacant European light-heavyweight title
26	Win	16–9–1	Mirco Ricci	TKO	10 (12)	12 Mar 2016	PalaVespucci, Rome, Italy	Won vacant European Union light-heavyweight title
25	Loss	15–9–1	Enrico Kölling	UD	8	5 Dec 2015	Inselparkhalle Wilhelmsburg, Hamburg, Germany	
24	Loss	15–8–1	Mehdi Amar	UD	12	17 Oct 2015	Salle Polyvalente de Mon Idée, Auvillers-les-Forges, France	For European Union light-heavyweight title
23	Draw	15–7–1	Juho Haapoja	SD	10	23 May 2015	PowerPark, Kauhava, Finland	
22	Win	15–7	Juho Haapoja	TKO	2 (10), 2:10	31 Jan 2015	PowerPark, Kauhava, Finland	
21	Loss	14–7	Dariusz Sęk	UD	8	10 May 2014	Hala sportowa OSIR, Brodnica, Poland	
20	Loss	14–6	Oscar Ahlin	UD	8	19 Oct 2013	Koldinghallerne, Kolding, Denmark	
19	Loss	14–5	Patrick Bois	UD	10	23 Feb 2013	Mazagan Beach Resort, El Jadida, Morocco	For WBF (Federation) International light-heavyweight title
18	Loss	14–4	Robert Woge	TKO	5 (8), 2:42	3 Nov 2012	Gerry Weber Stadion, Halle, Germany	
17	Win	14–3	Gyorgy Cselovszky	PTS	4	11 Nov 2011	Lauri Gym, Békéscsaba, Hungary	
16	Loss	13–3	Karo Murat	UD	12	29 Aug 2009	Gerry Weber Stadion, Halle, Germany	For vacant WBO Inter-Continental light-heavyweight title
15	Win	13–2	Josip Jalušić	PTS	6	27 Feb 2009	Fontana dell'Acqua Acetosa, Rome, Italy	
14	Win	13–1	Nuno Lagarto	PTS	6	13 Dec 2008	Teatro Tendastrisce, Rome, Italy	
13	Win	11–2	Drago Janjušević	TKO	4 (12)	10 May 2008	Belgrade, Serbia	Won IBF Inter-Continental light-heavyweight title
12	Win	12–0	Istvan Petroczki	TKO	3 (6)	25 Apr 2008	Palazzetto dello Sport, Pontinia, Italy	
11	Win	9–2	Achille Omang Boya	TKO	6 (6)	8 Mar 2008	Teatro Tendastrisce, Rome, Italy	
10	Win	8–2	Titusz Szabo	TKO	2 (6)	16 Sep 2007	Pomezia, Italy	
9	Win	7–2	Bernard Donfack	KO	2 (6)	26 Jun 2007	Ponte Milvio, Rome, Italy	
8	Loss	6–2	Mouhamed Ali Ndiaye	SD	10	10 Nov 2006	Palazzetto dello Sport, Pontedera, Italy	For vacant IBF Youth super-middleweight title
7	Win	6–1	Josip Jalušić	PTS	6	25 Mar 2006	Palazzetto dello Sport, Rome, Italy	
6	Loss	5–1	Jose Tavares	PTS	6	20 Oct 2005	Palais de la Méditerranée, Nice, France	
5	Win	5–0	Marius Mihai Dumitru	KO	1 (6)	25 Mar 2006	Stadio del tennis Foro Italico, Rome, Italy	
4	Win	4–0	Mihai Iorgu	KO	4 (6)	19 Mar 2005	PalaLuiss, Rome, Italy	
3	Win	3–0	Mihaly Kratki	TKO	4 (6)	26 Dec 2004	Palazzetto dello Sport, Rome, Italy	
2	Win	2–0	Roman Vanicky	KO	1 (6)	26 Nov 2004	Pala Parioli, Rome, Italy	
1	Win	1–0	Karoly Gyorfi	KO	1 (6)	23 Oct 2004	PalaLuiss, Rome, Italy	Professional debut

Sporting positions
Regional boxing titles
Preceded by Drago Janjušević	IBF Inter-Continental light-heavyweight champion 10 May 2008 – 2011; Vacated	Vacant Title next held by Karo Murat
Vacant Title last held by Mehdi Amar	European Union light-heavyweight champion 12 March 2016 – November 2016; Vacated	Vacant Title next held by Hakim Zoulikha
Preceded by Hakim Zoulikha	European Union light-heavyweight champion 18 May 2017 – February 2018; Vacated	Vacant Title next held by Orial Kolaj
