= Ian Tims =

Irish boxer

Ian Tims (born 3 December 1979) is an Irish cruiserweight professional boxer.

== Amateur career ==
He was Irish heavyweight champion.

== Professional career ==
=== Irish champion ===
In 2011, Tims won the Irish title.

=== European Union title challenge ===
In 2012, he lost to Juho Haapoja for the European Union title.

=== WBO regional title challenger ===
In 2012, he lost to Tony Conquest for the World Boxing Organization intercontinental title.

=== Celtic champion ===
In 2015, he won the Celtic title.

== Professional boxing record ==
19 fights	13 wins	6 losses
By knockout	4	4
By decision	9	2

No.	Result	Record	Opponent	Type	Round, time	Date	Location	Notes
19	Loss	13–6	(England) Jack Massey	TKO	2 (8)	9 Jun 2018	Manchester Arena, Manchester, England	
18	Loss	13–5	(Romania) Gheorghe Dănuț	PTS	6	1 Dec 2107	Devenish Complex, Belfast, Northern Ireland	
17	Loss	13–4	(England) Luke Watkins	KO	4 (10), 1:13	10 Jun 2017	Odyssey Place, Belfast, Northern Ireland	
16	Win	13–3	(Hungary) Attila Palko	TKO	5 (8), 0:45	24 Mar 2017	Crowne Plaza Glasgow, Glasgow, Scotland	
15	Win	12–3	(Lithuania) Remigijus Ziausys	PTS	6	8 Oct 2016	Europa Hotel, Belfast, Northern Ireland	
14	Win	11–3	(Republic of Ireland) Michael Sweeney	PTS	8	7 Nov 2015	(Republic of Ireland) National Stadium, Dublin, Ireland	Won vacant Celtic cruiserweight title
13	Loss	10–3	(Lithuania) Pavelas Nevedomskis	RTD	1 (6), 2:57	15 Nov 2014	(Republic of Ireland) 3Arena, Dublin, Ireland	Tims suffered a leg injury when knocked down and was stretchered from the ring
12	Win	10–2	(Hungary) Tamás Dankó	PTS	4	12 Sep 2014	(Republic of Ireland) Red Cow Moran Hotel, Dublin, Ireland	
11	Loss	9–2	(England) Tony Conquest	RTD	7 (10), 3:00	7 Sep 2012	York Hall, Bethnal Green, London, England	For inaugural WBO International cruiserweight title
10	Loss	9–1	(Finland) Juho Haapoja	UD	12	21 Jan 2012	Seinäjoki Areena, Seinäjoki, Finland	For European Union cruiserweight title
9	Win	9–0	(Republic of Ireland) Michael Sweeney	PTS	10	19 Mar 2011	(Republic of Ireland) City West Hotel, Dublin, Ireland	Won vacant Irish cruiserweight title
8	Win	8–0	(Hungary) Viktor Szalai	TKO	2 (6), 2:56	30 Jan 2011	(Republic of Ireland) City West Hotel, Dublin, Ireland	
7	Win	7–0	(Poland) Radosław Musiał	TKO	2 (8), 3:00	4 Dec 2009	(Republic of Ireland) Neptune Sports Arena, Cork, Ireland	
6	Win	6–0	(Latvia) Jevgeņijs Stamburskis	PTS	6	30 Jan 2009	(Republic of Ireland) City West Hotel, Dublin, Ireland	
5	Win	5–0	(Lithuania) Remigijus Ziausys	PTS	6	26 Oct 2008	(Republic of Ireland) Gleneagle Hotel, Killarney, Ireland	
4	Win	4–0	(Bulgaria) Alexandr Ignatov	RTD	1 (6), 3:00	13 Sep 2008	(Republic of Ireland) Neptune Sports Arena, Cork, Ireland	
3	Win	3–0	(Latvia) Jevgeņijs Andrejevs	PTS	4	12 Jul 2008	(Republic of Ireland) National Stadium, Dublin, Ireland	
2	Win	2–0	(Romania) Eduardu Mirica	PTS	4	19 Apr 2008	(Republic of Ireland) National Stadium, Dublin, Ireland	
1	Win	1–0	(Latvia) Klaids Kristapsons	PTS	4	22 Mar 2008	(Republic of Ireland) National Stadium, Dublin, Ireland	
