= Janne Katajisto =

Finnish boxer (born 1978)

Personal information
- Nickname: Finnish Butterbean
- Nationality: Finnish
- Born: 13 March 1978 (age 48) Kankaanpää, Finland
- Height: 1.80 m (5 ft 11 in)
- Weight: Heavyweight

Boxing career
- Stance: Orthodox

Boxing record
- Total fights: 19
- Wins: 16
- Win by KO: 8
- Losses: 2
- Draws: 1
Medal record
Men's amateur boxing
Finnish national championships
Gold medal – first place	2001 Helsinki	Super-heavyweight
Gold medal – first place	2002 Helsinki	Super-heavyweight

Janne Katajisto (born 13 March 1978) is a Finnish former professional boxer who competed from 2009 to 2014. He challenged once for the European Union heavyweight title in 2014, and won the Finnish heavyweight title in 2011.

== Amateur career ==
As an amateur, Katajisto won consecutive gold medals in the super-heavyweight division at the 2001 and 2002 Finnish national championships. At the 2001 event he defeated Robert Helenius in the first round, and in 2002 defeated him again in the final.

== Professional career ==
Katajisto made his professional debut on 8 August 2009, knocking out Igor Evseev in the first round. He won the Finnish heavyweight title on 24 September 2011, in a seventh-round stoppage over Petter Antman. Katajisto's first career loss came against Arnold Gjergjaj on 23 March 2013, who knocked him out in three rounds. A second loss came against future world heavyweight title challenger Johann Duhaupas on 5 April 2014, which was for the European Union heavyweight title. Katajisto was knocked out in the seventh round.

== Professional boxing record ==
19 fights	16 wins	2 losses
By knockout	8	2
By decision	8	0
Draws	1	

No.	Result	Record	Opponent	Type	Round, time	Date	Location	Notes
19	Loss	16–2–1	Johann Duhaupas	KO	7 (12)	5 Apr 2014	Salle Omnisports, Abbeville, France	For European Union heavyweight title
18	Win	16–1–1	Juris Kirins	TKO	3 (10), 2:01	10 Jan 2014	Club Rigas Rings, Riga, Latvia	
17	Win	15–1–1	Sandor Balogh	PTS	4	13 Jul 2013	Sisäsatama, Kemi, Finland	
16	Win	14–1–1	Janis Ginters	RTD	4 (6), 3:00	18 May 2013	Ravintola Parooni, Parkano, Finland	
15	Loss	13–1–1	Arnold Gjergjaj	KO	3 (8), 0:20	23 Mar 2013	Volkshaus, Basel, Switzerland	
14	Win	13–0–1	Olegs Lopajevs	TKO	2 (4), 2:45	18 Jan 2013	Club Rigas Rings, Riga, Latvia	
13	Win	12–0–1	Ivica Perkovic	UD	6	10 Nov 2012	Ice Hall, Helsinki, Finland	
12	Win	11–0–1	Danny Williams	UD	8	8 Sep 2012	Night Club Hullupullo, Vaasa, Finland	
11	Win	10–0–1	Pavlo Nechyporenko	TKO	3 (6), 0:44	21 Apr 2012	Restaurant Hotel Kantri, Kankaanpää, Finland	
10	Win	9–0–1	Petter Antman	TKO	7 (10), 2:09	24 Sep 2011	Ravintola Amarillo, Vaasa, Finland	Won vacant Finnish heavyweight title
9	Draw	8–0–1	Pavels Dolgovs	SD	8	28 May 2011	Restaurant Hotel Kantri, Kankaanpää, Finland	For vacant Baltic Boxing Union International heavyweight title
8	Win	8–0	Aleksandrs Selezens	UD	6	29 Jan 2011	Royal Night Club, Vaasa, Finland	Retained Baltic Boxing Union International heavyweight title
7	Win	7–0	Remigijus Ziausys	UD	6	20 Nov 2010	Restaurant Hotel Kantri, Kankaanpää, Finland	Won vacant Baltic Boxing Union International heavyweight title
6	Win	6–0	Igoris Borucha	PTS	6	7 Aug 2010	Royal Night Club, Vaasa, Finland	
5	Win	5–0	Dmitrijs Basovs	KO	3 (6), 2:58	11 Apr 2010	Maapohjahalli, Vaasa, Finland	
4	Win	4–0	Ladislav Kovarik	UD	4	6 Feb 2010	Ravintola Amarillo, Vaasa, Finland	
3	Win	3–0	Jevgenijs Zolotovs	TKO	2 (4), 0:40	14 Nov 2009	Maapohjahalli, Vaasa, Finland	
2	Win	2–0	Ferenc Zsalek	UD	4	12 Sep 2009	Promenadikeskus, Pori, Finland	
1	Win	1–0	Igor Evseev	KO	1 (4), 1:58	8 Aug 2009	Ulvila, Finland	

Sporting positions
Regional boxing titles
New title	BBU International heavyweight champion 20 November 2010 – ? Retired	Vacant
Vacant Title last held by Juho Haapoja	Finnish heavyweight champion 24 September 2011 – ? Retired	Vacant
