= Dariusz Sęk =

Polish boxer

Personal information
- Nationality: Polish
- Born: 22 July 1986 (age 40) Tarnów, Poland
- Height: 1.88 m (6 ft 2 in)
- Weight: Light-heavyweight

Boxing career
- Stance: Southpaw

Boxing record
- Total fights: 37
- Wins: 28
- Win by KO: 10
- Losses: 6
- Draws: 3

Dariusz Sęk (born 22 July 1986) is a Polish professional boxer who fights at light-heavyweight. Sęk is the last to hold the WBC Eurasia Pacific Boxing Council light heavyweight championship. He is a three-time bronze medalist of the Polish light heavyweight, including twice in the category of young riders and once in the seniors category middleweight (2007).

== Professional boxing career ==
Sęk made his professional debut in April 2009 defeating Kiril Psonko by UD 4 in Jarosław, Poland.

== Professional boxing record ==
38 fights, 28 wins (10 knockouts), 7 losses, 3 draws
No.	Result	Record	Opponent	Type	Round, time	Date	Location	Notes
38	Loss	28-7-3	(Poland) Pawel Augustynik	UD	10	21 Nov 2020	Zamek Gniew, Gniew, Poland	For WBC Silver International Light heavyweight title
37	Loss	28-6-3	(Poland) Sebastian Ślusarczyk	TKO	5 (8), 1:24	23 Nov 2019	(Poland) MOSiR Hall, Radom.	
36	Loss	28-5-3	(Poland) Robert Parzęczewski	TKO	2 (10), 2:17	23 Jun 2018	(Poland) Hala MOSiR im. Kazimierza Paździora, Radom.	
35	Win	28-4-3	(Poland) Tomasz Gargula	TKO	3 (6), 0:55	12 Oct 2018	(Poland) OSiR, ul. Pomologiczna 10, Skierniewice	
34	Loss	27-4-3	(United Kingdom) Anthony Yarde	TKO	7 (10), 2:17	23 Jun 2018	(United Kingdom) O2 Arena (Millennium Dome), Greenwich	For WBO European and WBO Inter-Continental light heavyweight titles.
33	Win	27-3-3	(Tanzania) Francis Cheka	TKO	3 (8), 2:56	21 Oct 2017	(Poland) Kopalnia Soli, Wieliczka	
32	Draw	26-3-3	(Poland) Marek Matyja	SD	10	19 Aug 2017	(Poland) Amfiteatr, Miedzyzdroje	For vacant Republic of Poland light heavyweight title.
31	Loss	26-3-2	(Ukraine) Viktor Polyakov	SD	8	22 Apr 2017	(Poland) Arena Hall, ul. B. Chrobrego 50B, Legionowo	
30	Draw	26-2-2	(Spain) Mustafa Chadlioui	SD	8	05 Nov 2016	(Poland) ICDS Hall, Łomianki	
29	Win	26-2-1	(Ukraine) Yevgeni Makhteienko	UD	8	7 May 2016	Sport Hall, Tarnów, Poland	
28	Win	25-2-1	(Croatia) Marko Benzon	UD	8	12 Dec 2015	HalL MOSiR, Ełk, Poland	
27	Win	24-2-1	(Brazil) Pedro Otas	UD	10	26 Sep 2015	Atlas Arena, Łódź, Poland	
26	Win	23-2-1	(Albania) Shefat Isufi	RTD	8 (12), 3:00	04 Jul 2015	Circus Krone, Munich, Bayern, Germany	Won vacant WBC–EPBC light heavyweight title.
25	Win	22-2-1	(Ukraine) Yevgeni Makhteienko	UD	8	21 Mar 2015	Hall OSiR, Brodnica, Poland	
24	Loss	21-2-1	(Albania) Robin Krasniqi	UD	12	20 Dec 2014	Ballhaus Forum, Munich, Bayern, Germany	For WBO International and WBA Continental (Europe) light heavyweight titles.
23	Win	21-1-1	(Algeria) Mohamed Belkacem	UD	10	19 Sep 2014	MOSiR Hall, Radom, Poland	
22	Win	20-1-1	(Italy) Serhiy Demchenko	UD	8	10 May 2014	Hall OSiR, Brodnica, Poland	
21	Loss	19-1-1	(Germany) Robert Woge	UD	12	08 Jun 2013	Max Halle, Prenzlauer Berg, Berlin, Germany	For IBF Inter-Continental light heavyweight title.
20	Win	19-0-1	(Netherlands) Farouk Daku	UD	8	10 May 2013	Urania Hall, Olsztyn, Poland	
19	Win	18-0-1	(Poland) Remigiusz Wóz	RTD	4 (8), 2:59	23 Feb 2013	Ergo Arena, Gdańsk, Poland	
18	Win	17-0-1	(Latvia) Arturs Kulikauskis	PTS	8	27 Oct 2012	Sport Hall, Częstochowa, Poland	
