= Robert Woge =

German boxer

Personal information
- Nationality: German
- Born: Robert Woge; May 14, 1984 (age 42) Bernburg, Bezirk Halle, East Germany
- Height: 1.80 m (5 ft 11 in)
- Weight: Light Heavyweight

Boxing career
- Stance: Orthodox

Boxing record
- Total fights: 13
- Wins: 12
- Win by KO: 10
- Losses: 1
- Draws: 0
- No contests: 0

Robert Woge (born 14 May 1984) is a retired German professional boxer. He is a former IBF Inter-Continental Light Heavyweight champion.

== Professional career ==
Woge won the vacant IBF Inter-Continental Light Heavyweight title on February 2, 2013 by defeating Hakim Zoulikha by eleventh-round technical knockout.

He would lose the title to Anatoliy Dudchenko on October 26, 2013 via twelfth-round unanimous decision.

== Professional boxing record ==
12 Wins (10 knockouts), 1 Loss, 0 Draws
Res.	Record	Opponent	Type	Round	Date	Location	Notes
Loss	12–1	(Ukraine) Anatoliy Dudchenko	UD	12	2013-10-26	(Germany) EWE Arena, Oldenburg, Lower Saxony	Lost IBF Inter-Continental Light Heavyweight title.
Win	12–0	(Poland) Dariusz Sęk	UD	12	2013-06-08	(Germany) Max-Schmeling-Halle, Prenzlauer Berg, Berlin	Retained IBF Inter-Continental Light Heavyweight title.
Win	11–0	(France) Hakim Zoulikha	TKO	11 (12), 2:25	2013-02-02	(Germany) Max-Schmeling-Halle, Prenzlauer Berg, Berlin	Won vacant IBF Inter-Continental Light Heavyweight title.
Win	10–0	(Ukraine) Serhiy Demchenko	TKO	5 (8), 2:42	2012-11-03	(Germany) Gerry Weber Stadion, Halle North Rhine-Westphalia	
Win	9–0	(Hungary) Ferenc Hafner	TKO	3 (8), 2:58	2012-05-05	(Germany) Messehalle, Erfurt, Thuringia	
Win	8–0	(United Kingdom) Carl Dilks	KO	3 (8), 2:28	2012-03-31	(Germany) Sparkassen-Arena, Kiel, Schleswig-Holstein	
Win	7–0	(Italy) Roberto Cocco	TKO	7 (8), 2:07	2012-02-25	(Germany) Porsche-Arena, Stuttgart, Baden-Württemberg	
Win	6–0	(Republic of Ireland) John Waldron	TKO	2 (6), 2:00	2011-10-22	(Germany) Arena Ludwigsburg, Ludwigsburg, Baden-Württemberg	
Win	5–0	(United Kingdom) Sam Couzens	TKO	5 (6), 1:26	2011-07-16	(Germany) Olympia Eishalle, Munich, Bavaria	
Win	4–0	(Albania) Orial Kolaj	MD	4	2010-10-30	(Germany) Stadthalle, Rostock, Mecklenburg-Vorpommern	
Win	3–0	(Slovakia) Miroslav Kvocka	TKO	2 (6)	2010-09-11	(Germany) Bitterfeld, Anhalt-Bitterfeld, Saxony-Anhalt	
Win	2–0	(Georgia (country)) Armen Azizian	TKO	3 (4)	2010-04-09	(Germany) Arena, Schwerin, Mecklenburg-Vorpommern	
Win	1–0	(Latvia) Valerijs Gubins	TKO	1 (4)	2010-03-27	(Germany) Sporthalle, Alsterdorf, Hamburg	Professional debut.
