= Tim Cronin =

Canadian boxer

Personal information
- Nickname: Irish
- Born: April 2, 1984 (age 42) Etobicoke, Ontario, Canada
- Height: 5 ft 10 in (178 cm)
- Weight: Light Heavyweight; Super Middleweight

Boxing career
- Reach: 59 in (150 cm)

Boxing record
- Total fights: 17
- Wins: 11
- Win by KO: 2
- Losses: 4
- Draws: 2

Tim Douglas Cronin (born April 2, 1984) is a Canadian boxer of Irish descent who competes as a Light Heavyweight. He is currently ranked as #8 in the BoxRec Canadian Light Heavyweight rankings.

== Professional career ==
On February 27, 2017, Cronin faced Mexican boxer Guillermo Herrera Campos. The. Fight ended in a contriversal draw after an accidental head caused a cut to Campos in the first minute of the opening round.

On July 28, 2017, Cronin faced Slovakian boxer Kristof Demendi in a six-round bout. He won the fight via unanimous decision.

On March 21, 2017, it was announced that Cronin would face Nathan Miller on April 4, 2017, for the Vacant NCC Light Heavyweight Title. He won the fight via unanimous decision to become the NCC Light Heavyweight Champion.

On May 30, 2017, it was announced that Cronin would face Montreal fighter Louisbert Altidor. He won the fight via an eight-round split decision.

== Championships and accomplishments ==
- National Championship of Canada
  - NCC Light Heavyweight Championship (One time)

== Professional boxing record ==
17 fights	11 wins	4 losses
By knockout	2	1
By decision	9	3
Draws	2	

No.	Result	Record	Opponent	Method	Round, time	Date	Location	Notes
17	Loss	11–4–2	(United States) Brian Barbosa	UD	6	Nov 23, 2019	(United States) Twin River Event Center, Lincoln, Rhode Island	
16	Loss	11–3–2	(Canada) Ryan Young	UD	10	May 11, 2019	(Canada) CAA Centre, Brampton, Ontario	Lost NCC Light Heavyweight Title
15	Draw	11–2–2	(Mexico) Juan Carlos Raygosa	MD	8	July 14, 2018	(Canada) Yardmen Arena, Belleville, Ontario	
14	Loss	11–2–1	(Poland) Robert Parzęczewski	TKO	8 (8), 2:42	Apr 21, 2018	Hala Sportowa, ul. Zuzlowa 4, Częstochowa, Poland	
13	Win	11–1–1	(Argentina) Juan Cruz Correa	MD	6	Mar 17, 2018	(Canada) Hershey Centre, Mississauga, Ontario	
12	Win	10–1–1	(Canada) Louisbert Altidor	SD	8	June 17, 2017	(Canada) Civic Complex, Cornwall, Ontario	
11	Win	9–1–1	(Canada) Nathan Miller	UD	8	April 4, 2017	(Canada) Royal York Hotel, Toronto, Ontario	Won Vacant NCC Light Heavyweight Title
10	Win	8–1–1	(Slovakia) Kristof Demendi	UD	6	July 28, 2016	(Canada) The Danforth Music Hall, Toronto, Ontario	
9	Draw	7–1–1	(Mexico) Guillermo Herrera Campos	TD	1 (8), 1:44	Feb 27, 2016	(Canada) Hershey Centre, Mississauga, Ontario	
8	Win	7–1	(Mexico) Lorenzo Bautista	UD	8	Dec 19, 2015	(Mexico) Coliseo Yucatan, Mérida, Yucatán	
7	Win	6–1	(Canada) Francois Miville	MD	6	Aug 29, 2015	(Canada) Hershey Centre, Mississauga, Ontario	
6	Win	5–1	(Argentina) Mariano Jose Riva	TKO	3 (6), 2:02	June 27, 2015	(Canada) Ajax Community Centre, Ajax, Ontario	
5	Win	4–1	(Canada) Travis Connors	TKO	3 (6), 0:50	Mar 28, 2015	(Canada) Hershey Centre, Mississauga, Ontario	
4	Win	3–1	(Canada) Jason Alexander	UD	4	Nov 15, 2014	(Canada) Hershey Centre, Mississauga, Ontario	
3	Win	2–1	(Canada) Colato Boakye	UD	4	Sep 6, 2014	(Canada) Hershey Centre, Mississauga, Ontario	
2	Win	1–1	(Canada) Jason Alexander	UD	4	May 3, 2014	(Canada) Hershey Centre, Mississauga, Ontario	
1	Loss	0–1	(Canada) Guillaume Tremblay-Coude	SD	4	Oct 26, 2013	(Canada) Zone Portuaire, Chicoutimi, Quebec	Professional debut
