= Dennis Bakhtov =

Russian boxer

Denis Bakhtov
Personal information
- Nickname: Darth Vader
- Nationality: Russian
- Born: Denis Bakhtov; 7 December 1979 (age 46) Karaganda, Kazakh SSR, Soviet Union
- Height: 5 ft 11 in (180 cm)

Boxing career
- Stance: Orthodox

Boxing record
- Total fights: 58
- Wins: 39
- Win by KO: 26
- Losses: 19
- Draws: 0

Denis Bakhtov (born December 7, 1979, in Kazakhstan) is a Russian professional boxer.

== Professional career ==
On October 11, 2014, Bakhtov fought future world champion Anthony Joshua, losing by technical knockout in the second round.

In 2015, Bakhtov was suspended after his fight against Arnold Gjergjaj due to failing a test which detected banned substances.

== Professional boxing record ==
39 Wins (26 knockouts, 13 decisions), 19 Losses (11 knockouts, 7 decisions)
Result	Record	Opponent	Type	Round	Date	Location	Notes
Loss	39-19	(Kazakhstan) Ivan Dychko	KO	1 (8), 1:00	10/07/2021	Baluan Sholak Sports Palace, Almaty, Kazakhstan	
Loss	39-18	(Russia) Abdulkerim Edilov	KO	1 (8), 0:50	03/09/2020	Grozny, Russia	
Loss	39-17	(Greece) Evgenios Lazaridis	RTD	4 (8), 3:00	21/09/2019	Sporthalle, Zinnowitz, Mecklenburg-Vorpommern, Germany	
Loss	39-16	(Ukraine) Vladyslav Sirenko	TKO	7 (8), 1:43	23/06/2019	Time Square, Menlyn, Pretoria, Gauteng, South Africa	
Loss	39-15	(Croatia) Petar Milas	TKO	6 (10), 1:51	06/04/2019	Ballhaus Forum, Unterschleißheim, Bayern, Germany	
Loss	39-14	(Germany) Hussein Muhamed	DQ	3 (8), 2:54	28/12/2018	Gildehaus, Luechow, Niedersachsen, Germany	
Loss	39-13	(Russia) Evgeny Romanov	TKO	1 (8), 2:15	22/04/2018	DIVS, Ekaterinburg, Russia	
Loss	39-12	(Belarus) Viktar Chvarkou	UD	6	30/09/2017	(Russia) Sports Palace Quant, Troitsk, Moscow	
Loss	39-11	(Switzerland) Arnold Gjergjaj	UD	12	07/06/2015	Basel, Switzerland	For vacant EBU-EE (European External European Union) Heavyweight title.
Win	39-10	(Russia) Yuri Lunev	TKO	3 (8)	08/11/2014	Narva, Estonia	
Loss	38-10	(United Kingdom) Anthony Joshua	TKO	2, 1:00 (12)	11-10-2014	(United Kingdom) The O2, Greenwich, London	WBC International Heavyweight title.
Win	38-9	(Germany) Konstantin Airich	UD	8 (8)	26/07/2014	Riga, Latvia	
Win	37-9	(Armenia) Sedrak Agagulyan	TKO	2 (6)	12/04/2014	Saint-Petersburg, Russia	
Loss	36-9	(Syria) Mahmoud Charr	RTD	5 (12)	19/10/2013	Sachsen, Germany	WBC International Silver Heavyweight title. WBC Mediterranean heavyweight title vacant WBC CIS and Slovenian Boxing Bureau (CISBB) heavyweight title WBC Baltic heavyweight title
Win	36-8	(United Kingdom) Danny Williams	UD	10	08/12/2012	Podolsk, Russia	
Loss	35-8	(Poland) Andrzej Wawrzyk	UD	10	02/06/2012	Bydgoszcz, Poland	WBA International heavyweight title
Win	35-7	(Ukraine) Serhiy Babych	TKO	2	19/05/2012	Klimovsk, Russia	
Win	34-7	(United States) Jonte Willis	SD	8	04/04/2012	Crocus City Hall, Moscow, Russia	
Loss	33-7	(Russia) Alexander Ustinov	UD	12	22/10/2011	Cherkasy, Ukraine	EBA Heavyweight Title. 111-117, 110-118, 110-119.
Loss	33-6	(Ukraine) Vyacheslav Glazkov	UD	8	26/03/2011	Ekaterinburg, Sverdlovsk Oblast, Russia	72-80, 72-80, 72-80.
Win	33-5	(Germany) Steffen Kretschmann	TKO	9	27/03/2010	Alsterdorf, Hamburg, Germany	PABA Heavyweight Title. Referee stopped the bout at 0:46 of the ninth round.
Win	32-5	(Latvia) Edgars Kalnars	KO	1	19/12/2009	Ekaterinburg, Sverdlovsk Oblast, Russia	Kalnars knocked out at 0:15 of the first round.
Win	31-5	(Uzbekistan) Sherzod Mamajanov	KO	4	24/10/2009	Ekaterinburg, Sverdlovsk Oblast, Russia	
Win	30-5	(Germany) Steffen Kretschmann	TKO	1	26/06/2009	Völklingen, Saarland, Germany	PABA Heavyweight Title. Referee stopped the bout at 2:34 of the first round.
Win	29-5	(Uzbekistan) Isroil Kurbanov	UD	6	30/04/2009	Moscow, Russia	59-56, 58-56, 58-56.
Win	28-5	(Egypt) Mazur Ali	TKO	4	20/09/2008	Salavat, Bashkortostan, Russia	PABA/WBC ABC Heavyweight Titles.
Win	27-5	(Finland) Juho Haapoja	KO	10	22/05/2008	Saint Petersburg, Russia	PABA/WBC ABC Heavyweight Titles. Haapaja knocked out at 1:59 of the tenth round.
Win	26-5	(United States) Corey "T-Rex" Sanders	UD	6	23/12/2007	Halle an der Saale, Sachsen-Anhalt, Germany	
Win	25-5	(Armenia) Sedrak Agagulyan	TKO	6	25/10/2007	Ekaterinburg, Sverdlovsk Oblast, Russia	
Loss	24-5	(Cuba) Juan Carlos Gomez	UD	12	16/06/2007	Ankara, Turkey	PABA Heavyweight Title. 108-120, 109-120, 108-120.
Win	24-4	(Sweden) Awadh Tamim	TKO	3	24/03/2007	Almaty, Kazakhstan	WBO Asia Pacific/PABA Heavyweight Titles.
Win	23-4	(Ukraine) Andriy Oliynyk	UD	12	03/12/2006	Ekaterinburg, Sverdlovsk Oblast, Russia	PABA Heavyweight Title.
Win	22-4	(Belarus) Ihar Shukala	TKO	3	11/05/2006	Ekaterinburg, Sverdlovsk Oblast, Russia	
Win	21-4	(Kenya) Joseph Akhasamba	UD	10	24/02/2006	(Khanty-Mansi Autonomous Okrug) Yugorsk, Yugra, Russia	99-91, 99-91, 99-91.
Loss	20-4	(Mexico) Saul Montana	TKO	5	27/04/2005	Moscow, Russia	
Win	20-3	(Switzerland) Nuri Seferi	UD	10	11/02/2005	Saint Petersburg, Russia	
Loss	19-3	(Turkey) Sinan Samil Sam	TKO	10	20/11/2004	Kempten, Bayern, Germany	WBC International Heavyweight Title. Referee stopped the bout at 0:48 of the tenth round.
Win	19-2	(Belarus) Raman Sukhaterin	UD	6	16/06/2004	Minsk, Belarus	
Win	18-2	(Belarus) Vitali Shkraba	TKO	8	30/04/2004	Saint Petersburg, Russia	Referee stopped the bout at 2:59 of the eighth round.
Win	17-2	(United Kingdom) Keith Long	UD	12	24/01/2004	Wembley, London, United Kingdom	WBC International Heavyweight Title. 116-113, 117-112, 117-112.
Win	16-2	(Ukraine) Oleksandr Myleiko	TKO	1	16/07/2003	Saint Petersburg, Russia	
Win	15-2	(United States) Garing "Freight Train" Lane	TKO	4	19/04/2003	Saint Petersburg, Russia	WBC International Heavyweight Title.
Win	14-2	(South Africa) Baldwin Hlongwane	TKO	3	21/12/2002	Saint Petersburg, Russia	WBC International Heavyweight Title.
Win	13-2	(Ukraine) Kostyantyn Pryziuk	UD	6	29/08/2002	Vyborg, Leningrad Oblast, Russia	
Win	12-2	(Belarus) Mihail Bekish	TKO	5	13/06/2002	Saint Petersburg, Russia	
Win	11-2	(United Kingdom) Matthew Ellis	TKO	5	02/03/2002	Bethnal Green, London, United Kingdom	WBC International Heavyweight Title. Referee stopped the bout at 0:58 of the fifth round.
Win	10-2	(Estonia) Vitali Strelkov	TKO	2	20/12/2001	Saint Petersburg, Russia	
Win	9-2	(United Kingdom) Alvin "The Chipmunk" Miller	KO	1	22/09/2001	Bethnal Green, London, United Kingdom	Miller knocked out at 1:25 of the first round.
Win	8-2	(Lithuania) Mindaugas Kulikauskas	RTD	1	01/08/2001	Vyborg, Leningrad Oblast, Russia	
Win	7-2	(Russia) Alexander "The Great" Vasiliev	TKO	8	13/04/2001	Moscow, Russia	WBC International Heavyweight Title.
Win	6-2	(Estonia) Dmitri Bannov	TKO	4	01/03/2001	Kohtla-Järve, Estonia	
Win	5-2	(Russia) Alexey Varakin	KO	2	08/02/2001	Ekaterinburg, Sverdlovsk Oblast, Russia	
Loss	4-2	(United Kingdom) Matthew Ellis	PTS	4	16/09/2000	Bethnal Green, London, United Kingdom	
Win	4-1	(Russia) Vladislav Berlev	UD	4	17/05/2000	Saint Petersburg, Russia	
Win	3-1	(Russia) Mikhail Nikitin	TKO	2	28/04/2000	Moscow, Russia	
Win	2-1	(Russia) Sergey "Iron Pause" Tretyakov	UD	4	10/03/2000	Saint Petersburg, Russia	
Loss	1-1	(Russia) Alexey Varakin	TKO	4	07/10/1999	Saint Petersburg, Russia	
Win	1-0	(Russia) Vladislav Belonogov	KO	1	29/09/1999	Moscow, Russia	Vlad knocked out at 1:53 of the first round.
