= Patrick Mendy =

Gambian-British boxer (born 1990)

Personal information
- Nickname: The Tiger
- Nationality: Gambian; British
- Born: Patrick Taylor Mendy; 26 September 1990 (age 36) The Gambia
- Height: 5 ft 9 in (175 cm)
- Weight: Middleweight; Super-middleweight

Boxing career
- Stance: Orthodox

Boxing record
- Total fights: 39
- Wins: 19
- Win by KO: 2
- Losses: 17
- Draws: 3

Patrick Taylor Mendy (born 26 September 1990) is a Gambian-British professional boxer.

== Professional career ==
Mendy fought his first professional fight on 6 March 2009 and had a bad start to his career losing his first two fights against Travis Dickinson and Tobias Webb, each of whom were making their debut. But he went on to win his next two fights: one against Matt Jack (on points), making his debut, and next against Luke Allon (on points), who had a record of two wins in two fights.

On 30 June 2010 Mendy competed in the 13th series of Prizefighter and came out the eventual winner of the competition. He came into the competition following a loss from undefeated Kenny Anderson. In his first fight he beat Sam Horton by TKO in the 1st round and broke the record for the fastest ever knockout in Prizefighter at 82 seconds (1:22min). In the semi-final he beat Daniel Cadman by unanimous decision with all the scorecards reading 29-28 in favour of Mendy. In the final he fought in form Paul David and won on unanimous decision again and received £32,000 for his win, the judges scorecards were all in favour of Mendy, 29-28, 29-28, 30-27. In this series he broke an outstanding 3 Prizefighter records:

- Youngest ever Prizefighter contestant (19 years and 276 days)
- Youngest ever Prizefighter winner (19 years and 276 days)
- Fastest ever knockout (Vs Sam Horton in 82 seconds (1:22)

I believed in myself and I said at the beginning I would win this - there were no doubts about it

— Patrick Mendy,

On 22 November 2014, Mendy fought against Polish boxer Robert Swierzbinski in Białystok, Poland. Mendy won by unanimous decision and received a first professional belt in his career - WBF in middleweight division.

== Professional boxing record ==
39 fights, 19 wins (2 knockouts), 17 losses (2 knockouts), 3 draw
No.	Result	Record	Opponent	Type	Round, time	Date	Location	Notes
39	Win	19–17–3	(Germany) Karwan Al Bewani	TKO	5 (10), 2:21	21 May 2021	Hyatt Regency Hotel, Belgrade, Serbia	Won GBU super middleweight title.
38	Loss	18–17–3	(Germany) Alexander Rigas	MD	8	26 Sep 2020	Classic Remise, Düsseldorf, Germany	
37	Loss	18–16–3	(Poland) Fiodor Czerkaszyn	KO	7 (8), 1:58	7 Mar 2020	Hala Sportowa, Łomża, Poland	
36	Loss	18–15–3	(Poland) Robert Parzęczewski	UD	10	4 Oct 2019	Hala Sportowa, Częstochowa, Poland	
35	Loss	18–14–3	(Latvia) Ričards Bolotņiks	MD	8	23 Mar 2019	Arēna Rīga, Riga, Latvia	
34	Win	18–13–3	(Russia) Dmitry Chudinov	UD	8	24 Nov 2017	Frederiksberg-Hallerne, Frederiksberg, Denmark	
33	Draw	17–13–3	(Finland) Niklas Räsänen	MD	10	26 Aug 2017	Olavinlinna, Savonlinna, Finland	
32	Loss	17–13–2	(Germany) Stefan Härtel	UD	10	17 Jun 2017	Rittal Arena, Wetzlar, Germany	
31	Loss	17–12–2	(Kazakhstan) Ali Akhmedov	UD	8	11 Mar 2017	Hala MOSiR, Siemiatycze, Poland	
30	Draw	17–11–2	(Russia) Apti Ustarkhanov	SD	12	10 Dec 2016	Soviet Wings Sport Palace, Moscow, Russia	For IBO Inter-Continental super middleweight title.
29	Loss	17–11–1	(Denmark) Lolenga Mock	MD	10	04 Jun 2016	Frederiksberg-Hallerne, Frederiksberg, Denmark	
28	Win	17–10–1	(Sweden) Oscar Ahlin	UD	8	23 Apr 2016	Johanneshov, Stockholm, Sweden	
27	Loss	16–10–1	(Cameroon) Hassan N'Dam N'Jikam	UD	8	12 Mar 2016	Palais des sports, Levallois-Perret, France	
26	Loss	16–9–1	(Poland) Kamil Szeremeta	UD	8	26 Sep 2015	Atlas Arena, Łódź, Poland	
25	Win	16–8–1	(Poland) Robert Swierzbinski	UD	12	22 Nov 2014	Sport Hall, Białystok, Poland	Won vacant WBF middleweight title.
24	Loss	15–8–1	(Russia) Arif Magomedov	UD	12	09 Aug 2014	(Autonomous Republic of Crimea) Open-Air Bike Show, Sevastopol, Crimea	For WBA Inter-Continental middleweight title.
23	Win	15–7–1	(Lithuania) Virgilijus Stapulionis	PTS	6	23 Feb 2014	(United Kingdom) York Hall, London, England	
22	Loss	14–7–1	(United Kingdom) Callum Smith	TKO	1 (10), 2:53	21 Sep 2013	(United Kingdom) Olympia, Liverpool, England	For vacant BBBofC super middleweight title.
21	Draw	14–6–1	(Russia) Dmitry Chudinov	PTS	8	20 Jul 2013	(United Kingdom) Wembley Arena, London, England	
20	Loss	14–6	(Denmark) Patrick Nielsen	UD	12	09 Feb 2013	Blue Water Dokken, Esbjerg, Denmark	For WBA Inter-Continental middleweight title.
19	Win	14–5	(Hungary) Norbert Szekeres	PTS	6	02 Jun 2012	(United Kingdom) ExCel Arena, London, England	
18	Loss	13–5	(United Kingdom) Bradley Pryce	PTS	10	24 Mar 2012	(United Kingdom) Ponds Forge Arena, Sheffield, England	
17	Win	13–4	(Latvia) Andrejs Loginovs	PTS	4	21 Nov 2011	(United Kingdom) Big Top, London, England	
16	Win	12–4	(United Kingdom) Tony Randell	PTS	4	27 Oct 2011	(United Kingdom) Millennium Hotel, London, England	
15	Win	11–4	(United Kingdom) Paul Samuels	PTS	6	30 Apr 2011	(United Kingdom) Olympia, London, England	
14	Win	10–4	(Latvia) Ruslans Pojonisevs	PTS	4	24 Mar 2011	(United Kingdom) Manor Park, Clydach, Wales	
13	Win	9–4	(United Kingdom) Jamie Ambler	PTS	4	06 Nov 2010	(United Kingdom) Newport Centre, Newport, Wales	
12	Win	8–4	(United Kingdom) Paul David	UD	3	30 Jun 2010	(United Kingdom) York Hall, London, England	
11	Win	7–4	(United Kingdom) Daniel Cadman	UD	3	30 Jun 2010	(United Kingdom) York Hall, London, England	
10	Win	6–4	(United Kingdom) Sam Horton	TKO	1 (3)	30 Jun 2010	(United Kingdom) York Hall, London, England	
9	Loss	5–4	(United Kingdom) Kenny Anderson	PTS	8	15 Mar 2010	(United Kingdom) Radisson Hotel, Glasgow, Scotland	
8	Win	5–3	(United Kingdom) Ally Morrison	PTS	4	01 Dec 2009	(United Kingdom) Sheraton Hotel, London, England	
7	Win	4–3	(United Kingdom) Sam Couzens	PTS	4	18 Nov 2009	(United Kingdom) Royal Lancaster Hotel, London, England	
6	Win	3–3	(United Kingdom) Marlon Reid	PTS	4	24 Oct 2009	(United Kingdom) Riviera International Conference Centre, Devon, England	
5	Loss	2–3	(United Kingdom) Jez Wilson	PTS	8	18 Jul 2009	(United Kingdom) Doncaster Racecourse, Doncaster, England	
4	Win	2–2	(United Kingdom) Luke Allon	PTS	6	06 Jun 2009	(United Kingdom) Leisure Complex, Beverley, England	
3	Win	1–2	(United Kingdom) Matt Jack	PTS	4	22 Mar 2009	(United Kingdom) York Hall, London, England	
2	Loss	0–2	(United Kingdom) Tobias Webb	PTS	4	14 Mar 2009	(United Kingdom) M.E.N. Arena, Manchester, England	
1	Loss	0–1	(United Kingdom) Travis Dickinson	PTS	4	06 Mar 2009	(United Kingdom) Robin Park Centre, Wigan, England	
