= Arnold Gjergjaj =

Swiss boxer (born 1984)

Personal information
- Nickname: The Cobra
- Nationality: Swiss
- Born: Arnold Gjergjaj; 8 October 1984 (age 41) Gjakova, Yugoslavia
- Height: 1.96 m (6 ft 5 in)
- Weight: Heavyweight

Boxing career
- Reach: 201 cm (79 in)

Boxing record
- Total fights: 41
- Wins: 38
- Win by KO: 27
- Losses: 3

Arnold Gjergjaj (born 8 October 1984) is a Swiss former professional boxer who competed from 2009 to 2024.

== Early life ==
Gjergjaj was born in Gjakova, Kosovo and he moved to Pratteln, Basel in Switzerland with his family when he was 14 years old. After graduating from school, he trained as a heating engineer.

== Amateur career ==
Gjergjaj began as a wrestler from a young age and later moved to kickboxing before taking up boxing, becoming a three-time Swiss amateur champion.

== Professional career ==
Gjergjaj turned professional at the age of 25 and made his debut in 2009. For the majority of his career he has fought low level opposition in Switzerland, building up an undefeated record of 29–0 with 21 knockouts.

Gjergjaj is trained by Angelo Gallina, who is also his manager. He has trained with world champions such as Vitali and Wladimir Klitschko, Tyson Fury and other top fighters as a sparring partner. He also learned in training sessions under the now deceased legendary German boxing coach Fritz Sdunek. He cites British former undisputed heavyweight world champion Lennox Lewis as his boxing idol. Gjergjaj won the EBU-EE European heavyweight title in October 2014, beating Adnan Redzovic by a knockout in the 9th round. He defended his title against Denis Bakhtov in June 2015, winning on points despite suffering a broken hand and burst eardrum, and being knocked down in the fifth round for the first time in his career.

On 30 March 2016, it was announced that Gjergjaj would be the second opponent of former champion David Haye since Haye made his return to boxing after a three-year layoff. The fight, which was the biggest of Gjergjaj career to date, took place at The O2 Arena in London on 21 May 2016. Haye received criticism from some fans for picking a second relatively unknown and moderately ranked opponent. However, Gjergjaj was ranked 24th in the world on the independent platform Boxrec before the match with Haye, and at no. 8 in Europe by the EBU. Haye stopped Gjergjaj in the second round via TKO, after having put him on the canvas three times before the referee stopped the fight.

== Personal life ==
Gjergjaj married his wife Marta in August 2014 in Pratteln. He has been involved in fields such as developmental aid organization Terre des Hommes Switzerland and has shown commitment to helping the youth in his hometown, where he opened his own boxing club "Arnold Boxfit" on 23 January 2016.

== Professional boxing record ==
41 fights	38 wins	3 losses
By knockout	27	2
By decision	10	1
By disqualification	1	0

No.	Result	Record	Opponent	Type	Round, time	Date	Location	Notes
41	Win	38–3	Dennis Lewandowski	UD	10	27 Apr 2024	Grand Casino, Basel, Switzerland	
40	Win	37–3	Bilal Laggoune	SD	12	2 Sep 2023	Landgasthof, Riehen, Switzerland	Won vacant WBF heavyweight title
39	Win	36–3	Kristaps Zutis	KO	4 (10), 2:00	24 Jun 2023	Airporthotel, Basel, Switzerland	Retained WBF Inter-Continental heavyweight title
38	Win	35–3	Dominic Vial	TKO	2 (10), 2:34	25 Mar 2023	Grand Casino, Basel, Switzerland	Won vacant WBF Inter-Continental heavyweight title
37	Win	34–3	Tomislav Sentic	TKO	1 (6), 1:52	10 Jun 2022	Stadthofsaal, Uster, Switzerland	
36	Win	33–3	Elvis Moyo	UD	8	25 May 2019	Sporthalle, Kirchberg, Switzerland	
35	Loss	32–3	Umut Camkiran	UD	12	19 Apr 2019	Silence Hotel, Istanbul, Turkey	Lost External heavyweight title
34	Win	32–2	Mirko Tintor	KO	4 (8), 1:59	15 Dec 2018	Grand Casino, Basel, Switzerland	
33	Win	31–2	Gogita Gorgiladze	KO	2 (8), 1:12	1 Sep 2018	Kultur und Sportzentrum (Kuspo), Pratteln, Switzerland	
32	Loss	30–2	Sean Turner	KO	8 (8), 1:45	9 Dec 2017	Grand Casino, Basel, Switzerland	
31	Win	30–1	Jasmin Hasic	TKO	5 (8), 1:00	17 Dec 2016	Kaserne, Basel, Switzerland	
30	Loss	29–1	David Haye	TKO	2 (10), 1:35	21 May 2016	The O2 Arena, London, England	
29	Win	29–0	Marino Goles	TKO	1 (8), 0:45	5 Dec 2015	Umweltarena, Spreitenbach, Switzerland	
28	Win	28–0	Denis Bakhtov	UD	12	6 Jun 2015	St. Jakob Halle, Basel, Switzerland	Retained External heavyweight title
27	Win	27–0	Zoltan Csala	UD	8	27 Feb 2015	Grand Casino, Basel, Switzerland	
26	Win	26–0	Adnan Redzovic	KO	9 (12), 2:50	4 Oct 2014	St. Jakob Halle, Basel, Switzerland	Won vacant External heavyweight title
25	Win	25–0	Tibor Balogh	TKO	2 (8), 2:20	9 Jun 2014	Seminar Hotel Lueg, Kaltacker, Burgdorf, Switzerland	
24	Win	24–0	Emilio Zarate	KO	7 (8)	15 Mar 2014	Grand Casino, Basel, Switzerland	
23	Win	23–0	Gilberto Domingos	TKO	1 (8), 2:15	26 Dec 2013	Kursaal, Bern, Switzerland	
22	Win	22–0	Nelson Dominguez	KO	3 (8), 2:19	11 May 2013	Grand Casino, Basel, Switzerland	
21	Win	21–0	Janne Katajisto	KO	3 (8), 0:20	23 Mar 2013	Volkshaus, Basel, Switzerland	
20	Win	20–0	Yury Bykhautsou	TKO	3 (8), 2:10	26 Dec 2012	Kursaal, Bern, Switzerland	
19	Win	19–0	Maksym Pedyura	TKO	2 (8), 2:50	1 Dec 2012	Grand Casino, Basel, Switzerland	
18	Win	18–0	Mateusz Malujda	TKO	1 (8), 2:03	20 Oct 2012	Markthalle, Basel, Switzerland	
17	Win	17–0	Alexander Kahl	KO	1 (6), 1:18	15 Sep 2012	Grand Casino, Basel, Switzerland	
16	Win	16–0	Adnan Buharalija	TKO	3 (8), 1:50	14 Apr 2012	Pfaffenholzturnhalle, Basel, Switzerland	
15	Win	15–0	Prince Anthony Ikeji	KO	2 (8), 1:38	17 Dec 2011	Kaserne, Basel, Switzerland	
14	Win	14–0	Laszlo Toth	KO	3 (8)	12 Nov 2011	City Sporthall, Szekszárd, Hungary	
13	Win	13–0	Gabor Farkas	UD	8	1 Oct 2011	Turnhalle Landstrasse, Gebenstorf, Switzerland	
12	Win	12–0	Ferenc Zsalek	DQ	6 (8), 1:50	20 Aug 2011	Kursaal, Bern, Switzerland	
11	Win	11–0	Igoris Borucha	UD	6	28 May 2011	Sporthalle Badbetrieb, Bad Ragaz, Switzerland	
10	Win	10–0	Liviu Ungureanu	TKO	3 (6), 2:57	7 May 2011	Salle Sport, Lausanne, Switzerland	
9	Win	9–0	Pavels Dolgovs	UD	6	5 Feb 2011	Turnhalle Eg, Frenkendorf, Switzerland	
8	Win	8–0	Tomasz Zeprzalka	TKO	5 (6), 2:40	18 Dec 2010	Kaserne, Basel, Switzerland	
7	Win	7–0	Dimitar Stoimenov	UD	6	18 Jul 2010	Kaserne, Basel, Switzerland	
6	Win	6–0	Gabor Farkas	TKO	3 (6)	29 May 2010	Kursaal, Bern, Switzerland	
5	Win	5–0	Norbert Sallai	TKO	4 (6), 2:25	17 Apr 2010	Airporthotel, Basel, Switzerland	
4	Win	4–0	Yavor Marinchev	UD	6	26 Mar 2010	Palestra Nuova, Ascona, Switzerland	
3	Win	3–0	Sandor Balogh	TKO	6 (6), 2:30	19 Dec 2009	Kaserne, Basel, Switzerland	
2	Win	2–0	Zoltan Huffner	KO	1 (6), 2:30	5 Dec 2009	Sporthalle, Kirchberg, Switzerland	
1	Win	1–0	Dariusz Balla	TKO	2 (4), 1:01	29 Aug 2009	Römertheater, Augusta Raurica, Augst, Switzerland	
