= Cristian Sanavia =

Italian boxer

Personal information
- Nationality: Italian
- Born: 27 February 1975 (age 51) Piove di Sacco, Italy
- Height: 5 ft 7 1/2 in (171 cm)
- Weight: Middleweight; Super middleweight

Boxing career
- Stance: Southpaw

Boxing record
- Total fights: 56
- Wins: 49
- Win by KO: 15
- Losses: 6
- Draws: 1
Medal record
Men's Boxing
Representing Italy
Mediterranean Games
Bronze medal – third place	Bari 1997	Light middleweight

Cristian Sanavia (born 27 February 1975) is an Italian former professional boxer who competed from 1997 to 2014. He held the WBC super middleweight title in 2004.

== Professional career ==
Sanavia turned pro in 1997 and captured the WBC Super Middleweight Title in 2004 with an upset win over Markus Beyer by split decision. He lost the title in a rematch with Beyer via 6th round KO. Sanavia has not fought for another major title since the rematch with Beyer. He announced his retirement in 2012 but has fought since then.

== Professional boxing record ==
56 fights	49 wins	6 losses
By knockout	15	4
By decision	34	2
Draws	1	

No.	Result	Record	Opponent	Type	Round, time	Date	Location	Notes
56	Win	49–6–1	Kiril Psonko	PTS	6 (6)	2014-03-22	Palasport, Pontedera, Italy	
55	Win	48–6–1	Marko Benzon	PTS	6 (6)	2013-09-28	Ippodromo Le Padovanelle, Ponte di Brenta, Italy	
54	Win	47–6–1	Marijo Markovic	TKO	2 (6)	2013-05-05	Albignasego, Italy	
53	Win	46–6–1	Janos Olah	TKO	5 (6)	2013-04-20	Verona, Italy	
52	Loss	45–6–1	James DeGale	TKO	4 (12)	2012-04-21	Arena Nord, Frederikshavn, Denmark	For EBU super middleweight title
51	Win	45–5–1	Armend Tatari	PTS	6 (6)	2011-07-29	Padovaland, Padua, Italy	
50	Win	44–5–1	Pavels Lotahs	PTS	6 (6)	2011-05-06	Monselice, Italy	
49	Win	43–5–1	Mariusz Biskupski	TKO	3 (6)	2010-12-04	PalaFabris, Padua, Italy	
48	Win	42–5–1	Hadillah Mohoumadi	PTS	8 (8)	2010-10-22	Palasport, Padua, Italy	
47	Win	41–5–1	Sandor Ramocsa	PTS	8 (8)	2010-04-24	Palasport, Camisano Vicentino, Italy	
46	Loss	40–5–1	Karo Murat	TKO	10 (12)	2009-02-28	Jahnsportforum, Neubrandenburg, Germany	For EBU super middleweight title
45	Loss	40–4–1	Karo Murat	UD	12 (12)	2008-04-12	Jahnsportforum, Neubrandenburg, Germany	Lost EBU super middleweight title
44	Draw	40–3–1	Danilo Häussler	PTS	12 (12)	2007-12-08	St. Jakobshalle, Basel, Switzerland	Retained EBU super middleweight title
43	Win	40–3	David Gogiya	SD	12 (12)	2007-06-01	Chapiteau place Miot, Ajaccio, France	Won EBU super middleweight title
42	Win	39–3	Roman Vanicky	PTS	6 (6)	2006-12-17	Battaglia Terme, Italy	
41	Win	38–3	Sylvain Gomis	PTS	6 (6)	2006-07-27	Velodromo Vigorelli, Milan, Italy	
40	Win	37–3	Kanstantsin Makhankou	PTS	8 (8)	2006-05-19	Palazzetto dello Sport, Abano Terme, Italy	
39	Win	36–3	Christophe Karagoz	PTS	8 (8)	2005-12-20	Palazzetto dello Sport, Bergamo, Italy	
38	Loss	35–3	Danilo Häussler	MD	12 (12)	2005-07-16	Arena Nürnberger Versicherung, Nürnberg, Germany	For vacant WBA Inter-Continental super middleweight title
37	Win	35–2	Didier Nkuku Mupeko	PTS	6 (6)	2005-06-17	PalaLido, Milan, Italy	
36	Win	34–2	Eliseo Nogueira	PTS	6 (6)	2005-03-12	Mazda Palace, Milan, Italy	
35	Loss	33–2	Markus Beyer	KO	6 (12)	2004-10-09	Messehalle, Erfurt, Germany	Lost WBC super middleweight title
34	Win	33–1	Markus Beyer	SD	12 (12)	2004-06-05	Chemnitz Arena, Chemnitz, Germany	Won WBC super middleweight title
33	Win	32–1	Mike Algoet	PTS	8 (8)	2004-02-10	Cava Manara, Italy	
32	Win	31–1	Didier Nkuku Mupeko	UD	6 (6)	2003-12-13	Palasport, Padua, Italy	
31	Win	30–1	Mugurel Sebe	PTS	6 (6)	2003-10-14	Pala Italia Online, Milan, Italy	
30	Win	29–1	Pierre Moreno	PTS	6 (6)	2003-06-07	Casino di Campione, Trieste, Italy	
29	Win	28–1	Silvio Walter Rojas	TKO	2 (6)	2003-02-11	Pentagono, Bormio, Italy	
28	Win	27–1	Martial Bella Oleme	PTS	6 (6)	2002-12-21	Brolo, Italy	
27	Win	26–1	Didier Nkuku Mupeko	PTS	6 (6)	2002-10-11	Campione d'Italia, Italy	
26	Loss	25–1	Morrade Hakkar	RTD	7 (12)	2002-05-11	Milan, Italy	Lost EBU middleweight title
25	Win	25–0	Morrade Hakkar	MD	12 (12)	2001-12-01	Padua, Italy	Won vacant EBU middleweight title
24	Win	24–0	Ramon Pedro Moyano	TKO	12 (12)	2001-07-28	Piove di Sacco, Italy	Retained WBC International middleweight title
23	Win	23–0	Eliseo Nogueira	PTS	6 (6)	2001-05-26	Trieste, Italy	
22	Win	22–0	Jerry Elliott	UD	12 (12)	2001-02-17	Padua, Italy	Won WBC International middleweight title
21	Win	21–0	Eliseo Nogueira	PTS	6 (6)	2000-12-26	Roma, Italy	
20	Win	20–0	Andile Tshongolo	KO	1 (12)	2000-07-14	Caorle, Italy	Won WBU Intercontinental middleweight title
19	Win	19–0	Francesco Pernice	KO	3 (10)	2000-04-12	Badia Polesine, Italy	Retained Italian middleweight title
18	Win	18–0	Claudio Ciarlante	TKO	4 (10)	2000-02-25	Battipaglia, Italy	Retained Italian middleweight title
17	Win	17–0	Jean Paul D'Alessandro	PTS	6 (6)	1999-12-17	Trapani, Italy	
16	Win	16–0	Alessandro Filippo	TKO	7 (10)	1999-10-22	Onara di Tombolo, Italy	Retained Italian middleweight title
15	Win	15–0	Carlos Montero	PTS	6 (6)	1999-08-04	Belvedere Tezze, Italy	
14	Win	14–0	Marco Dell'Uomo	PTS	10 (10)	1999-06-19	Piove di Sacco, Italy	Won vacant Italian middleweight title
13	Win	13–0	Jorge Ramirez	PTS	6 (6)	1999-02-20	Campobello di Mazara, Italy	
12	Win	12–0	Norbert Miklos	TKO	2 (?)	1998-12-30	Monfalcone, Italy	
11	Win	11–0	Janos Hollo	KO	1 (?)	1998-12-18	Brindisi, Italy	
10	Win	10–0	Marino Monteyne	PTS	8 (8)	1998-11-14	Mendrisio, Switzerland	
9	Win	9–0	Santo Colombo	PTS	8 (8)	1998-10-09	Ariano nel Polesine, Italy	
8	Win	8–0	Gyorgy Lakatos	TKO	5 (?)	1998-07-19	Sequals, Italy	
7	Win	7–0	Janos Hollo	TKO	2 (?)	1998-06-05	Teatro Tenda, Cadoneghe, Italy	
6	Win	6–0	Csaba Balatoni	PTS	6 (6)	1998-04-19	S. Cassiano Brugnera, Italy	
5	Win	5–0	Tibor Horvath	PTS	6 (6)	1998-04-03	Piove di Sacco, Italy	
4	Win	4–0	Francesco Fiorentino	TKO	4 (6)	1998-02-13	Ariano nel Polesine, Italy	
3	Win	3–0	Thierry Libois	PTS	6 (6)	1997-12-19	Palasport, Piove di Sacco, Italy	
2	Win	2–0	Waldemar Barta	PTS	6 (6)	1997-12-06	Palasport, Catanzaro, Italy	
1	Win	1–0	Patrick Rubes	KO	2 (?)	1997-10-10	Rosolina, Italy	

== See also ==
- List of world super-middleweight boxing champions

Sporting positions
Regional boxing titles
Vacant Title last held by Howard Eastman	EBU middleweight champion 1 December 2001 – 11 May 2002	Succeeded by Morrade Hakkar
Preceded by David Gogiya	EBU super middleweight champion 1 June 2007 – 12 April 2008	Succeeded by Karo Murat
World boxing titles
Preceded by Markus Beyer	WBC super middleweight champion 5 June 2004 – 9 October 2004	Succeeded by Markus Beyer
