= Markus Beyer =

German boxer (1971–2018)

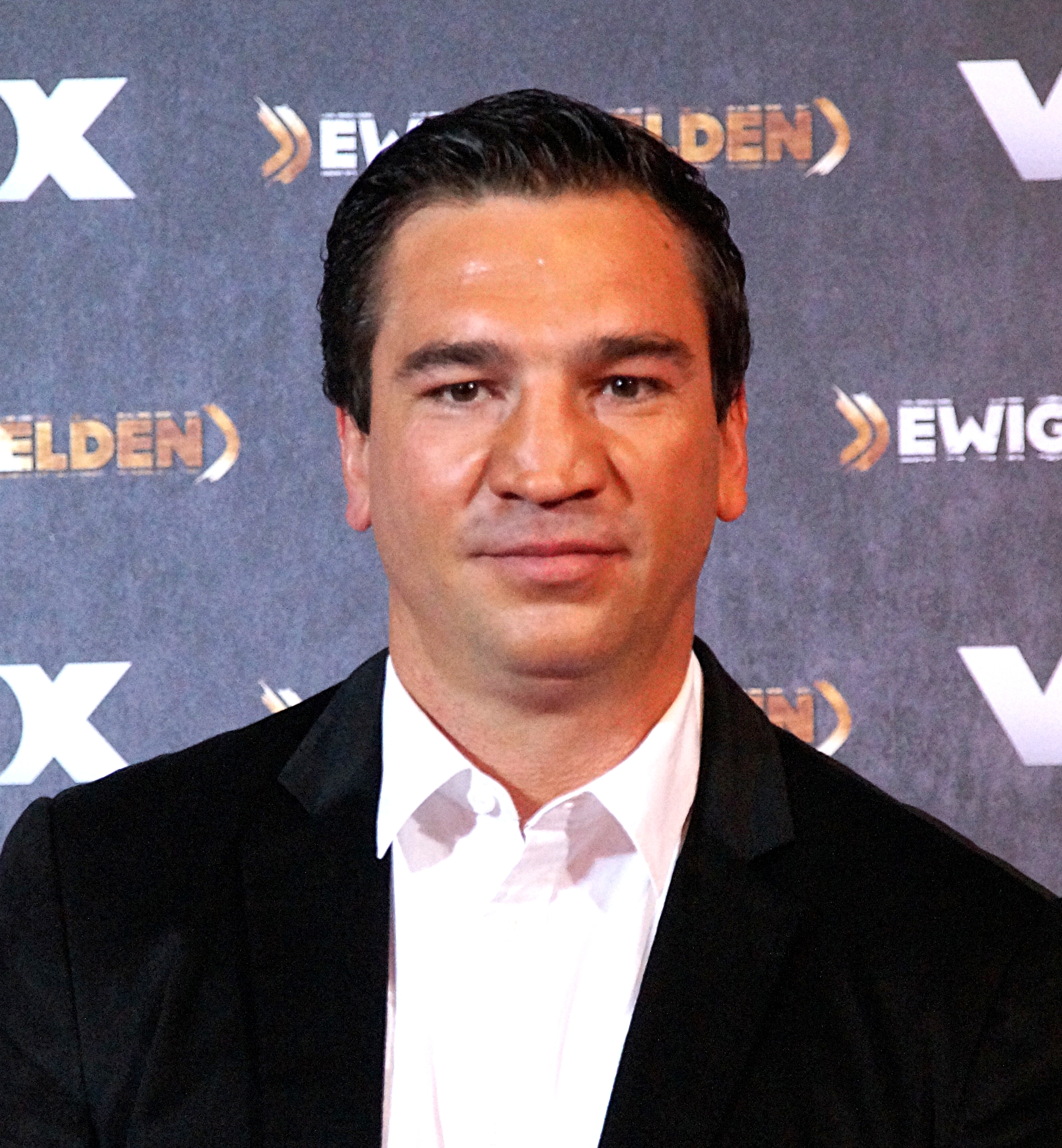
- Beyer in 2015

Personal information
- Nickname: Boom Boom
- Nationality: German
- Born: Markus Beyer; April 28, 1971 Erlabrunn, East Germany
- Died: 3 December 2018 (aged 47) Berlin, Germany
- Height: 5 ft 9 1/2 in (177 cm)
- Weight: Super middleweight

Boxing career
- Reach: 71 in (180 cm)
- Stance: Southpaw

Boxing record
- Total fights: 39
- Wins: 35
- Win by KO: 13
- Losses: 3
- Draws: 1
Medal record
Men's Boxing
Representing Germany
World Amateur Championships
Bronze medal – third place	1995 Berlin	Light middleweight
European Amateur Championships
Silver medal – second place	1996 Vejle	Light middleweight

Markus Beyer (28 April 1971 – 3 December 2018) was a German professional boxer who won the World Boxing Council super middleweight title three times. As an amateur, he represented Germany at the 1992 and 1996 Olympic Games in the light middleweight division. He also won a bronze medal at the 1995 World Amateur Boxing Championships and silver at the 1996 European Amateur Boxing Championships.

== Amateur career ==
Beyer's amateur record was 235 wins in 274 fights.

- 1988 East German Featherweight Champion, won the Junior European Flyweight Championship in Gdansk, Poland beating Zoltan Lunka (Romania) in the final.
- 1989 2nd place at the Junior World Championship in Bayamon, Puerto Rico as a Featherweight
- 1992 competed at the Barcelona Olympics as a Light Middleweight. Results were:
  - Defeated Sililo Figota (New Zealand) PTS (16–2)
  - Lost to Juan Carlos Lemus (Cuba) RSCH-1
- 1993 German Light Middleweight Champion, competed at the World Championship in Tampere, Finland
- 1994 2nd place at German Championship, losing the final to Mario Veit
- 1995 German Light Middleweight Champion, 3rd place at World Championship in Berlin, Germany
- 1996 2nd Place at European Championship in Vejle (Denmark) losing the final to Francisc Vastag (Romania), competed at the Atlanta Olympics. Results were:
  - Defeated Francisc Vastag (Romania) PTS (17–12)
  - Defeated Gyorgy Mizsei (Hungary) PTS (14–3)
  - Lost to Yermakhan Ibraimov (Kazakhstan) PTS (9–19)

== Professional career ==
On 23 October 1999, Beyer won his first world title against WBC super middleweight champion Richie Woodhall. He successfully defended the title against Leif Keiski before losing it to Glenn Catley.

On 5 April 2003, Beyer challenged Canadian WBC super middleweight champion Eric Lucas and was awarded a highly controversial split decision in Germany. It was later proven that Beyer's team cheated by obtaining the judges' scores during the fight. Beyer defended the title against Danny Green and Andre Thysse before being upset by Cristian Sanavia. Beyer defeated Sanavia by knockout in a rematch then went on to retain the title five times by scoring wins over Yoshinori Nishizawa, Danny Green, Omar Sheika, Alberto Colajanni, and a draw against Sakio Bika.

On 14 October 2006, Beyer lost his title via third-round knockout to WBA super middleweight champion Mikkel Kessler in a unification fight.

=== Titles held ===
- German super middleweight;
- IBF Intercontinental super middleweight;
- 3 times WBC super middleweight 23 October 1999 to 6 May 2000; 5 April 2003 to 5 June 2004; 9 October 2004 to 14 October 2006
- WBC International super middleweight; 21 April 2001 to 24 August 2002

== Professional boxing record ==
39 fights	35 wins	3 losses
By knockout	13	2
By decision	21	1
By disqualification	1	0
Draws	1	

No.	Result	Record	Opponent	Type	Round, time	Date	Location	Notes
39	Win	35–3–1	(Russia) Murad Makhmudov	UD	8	2008-03-14	Kulturhalle Zenith, Munich, Germany	
38	Loss	34–3–1	(Denmark) Mikkel Kessler	KO	3 (12), 2:58	2006-10-14	Parken Stadium, Copenhagen, Denmark	Lost WBC & WBA (Super) Super middleweight title unification match
37	Draw	34–2–1	(Cameroon) Sakio Bika	TD	4 (12), 1:45	2006-05-13	Stadthalle, Zwickau, Germany	Retained WBC super middleweight title.
36	Win	34–2	(Italy) Alberto Colajanni	TKO	12 (12), 2:12	2006-01-28	Tempodrom, Kreuzberg, Germany	Retained WBC super middleweight title.
35	Win	33–2	(United States) Omar Sheika	UD	12	2005-09-03	International Congress Center, Charlottenburg, Germany	Retained WBC super middleweight title.
34	Win	32–2	(Australia) Danny Green	MD	12	2005-03-12	Stadthalle, Zwickau, Germany	Retained WBC super middleweight title.
33	Win	31–2	(Japan) Yoshinori Nishizawa	UD	12	2004-12-18	Oberfrankenhalle, Bayreuth, Germany	Retained WBC super middleweight title.
32	Win	30–2	(Italy) Cristian Sanavia	KO	6 (12), 0:44	2004-10-09	Messehalle, Erfurt, Germany	Won WBC super middleweight title.
31	Loss	29–2	(Italy) Cristian Sanavia	SD	12	2004-06-05	Chemnitz Arena, Chemnitz, Germany	Lost WBC super middleweight title.
30	Win	29–1	(South Africa) Andre Thysse	UD	12	2004-02-28	Mehrzweckhalle, Dresden, Germany	Retained WBC super middleweight title.
29	Win	28–1	(Australia) Danny Green	DQ	5 (12)	2003-08-16	Nürburgring, Nürburg, Germany	Retained and unified WBC super middleweight title.
28	Win	27–1	(Canada) Éric Lucas	SD	12	2003-04-05	Arena Leipzig, Leipzig, Germany	Won WBC super middleweight title.
27	Win	26–1	(United States) Roni Martinez	TKO	4 (8)	2002-08-24	Arena Leipzig, Leipzig, Germany	
26	Win	25–1	(Italy) Vincenzo Imparato	UD	12	2002-04-27	Erdgas Arena, Riesa, Germany	Retained WBC International Super middleweight title.
25	Win	24–1	(United States) Anton Robinson	TKO	7 (12)	2002-03-09	Brandenburg Halle, Frankfurt, Germany	Retained WBC International Super middleweight title.
24	Win	23–1	(United States) Shannon Landberg	UD	10	2001-10-06	Eisstadion, Cologne, Germany	
23	Win	22–1	(United States) Glenn Odem	UD	8	2001-09-01	Bordelandhalle, Magdeburg, Germany	
22	Win	21–1	(United States) Manuel Lopez	KO	7 (12)	2001-04-21	Messehalle, Erfurt, Germany	Won WBC International Super middleweight title.
21	Win	20–1	(Jamaica) Lloyd Bryan	UD	10	2001-01-27	Erdgas Arena, Riesa, Germany	
20	Win	19–1	(Algeria) Ahmed Dine	UD	8	2000-12-16	Europahalle, Karlsruhe, Germany	
19	Loss	18–1	(United Kingdom) Glenn Catley	TKO	12 (12), 0:53	2000-05-06	Ballsporthalle, Frankfurt, Germany	Lost WBC Super-middleweight title.
18	Win	18–0	(Sweden) Leif Keiski	KO	7 (12), 1:47	2000-01-29	Erdgas Arena, Riesa, Germany	Retained WBC Super-middleweight title.
17	Win	17–0	(United Kingdom) Richie Woodhall	UD	12	1999-10-23	(United Kingdom) Telford Ice Rink, Telford, England	Won WBC Super-middleweight title.
16	Win	16–0	(Colombia) Juan Carlos Viloria	UD	12	1999-06-05	Ballsporthalle, Frankfurt, Germany	Won IBF Inter-Continental Super-middleweight title.
15	Win	15–0	(Romania) Octavian Stoica	PTS	8	1999-05-08	Philips Halle, Düsseldorf, Germany	
14	Win	14–0	(France) Rene-Claude Dutard	UD	8	1999-02-27	Max-Schmeling-Halle, Prenzlauer Berg, Germany	
13	Win	13–0	(United States) Robert Koon	PTS	8	1998-12-05	Cologne, Germany	
12	Win	12–0	(Russia) Yuri Epifantsev	TKO	7 (8)	1998-04-18	Duisburg, Germany	
11	Win	11–0	(Germany) Alexander Boy	KO	7 (10)	1998-01-11	Erdgas Arena, Riesa, Germany	Won Germany BDB Middleweight title.
10	Win	10–0	(United States) Kevin Pompey	PTS	8	1997-11-02	Halle an der Saale, Germany	
9	Win	9–0	(United States) Terry Ford	KO	4 (?)	1997-10-05	Gera, Germany	
8	Win	8–0	(United Kingdom) Simon Andrews	TKO	5 (6), 2:04	1997-07-12	(United Kingdom) Olympia, Kensington, England	
7	Win	7–0	(United States) Danny Thomas	PTS	6	1997-06-22	Cologne, Germany	
6	Win	6–0	(United Kingdom) Paul Busby	PTS	8	1997-06-01	Riesa, Germany	
5	Win	5–0	(Russia) Yuri Filipko	PTS	6	1997-04-26	Leipzig, Germany	
4	Win	4–0	(Cameroon) Isidore Janvier	TKO	5 (6)	1997-04-13	Cologne, Germany	
3	Win	3–0	(United Kingdom) Andy Flute	PTS	6	1997-02-15	Kurhalle Oberlaa, Vienna, Austria	
2	Win	2–0	(United States) Harold Roberts	TKO	2 (6)	1996-12-07	Vienna, Austria	
1	Win	1–0	(United States) Eric Davis	TKO	6 (6)	1996-11-23	Olympiahalle, Munich, Germany	Professional debut

== Personal life ==
In 2008, Beyer married Daniela Haak, aka Lady Danii from the Mr. President Eurodance band.

Beyer died 3 December 2018 of a short and serious illness, believed to be kidney cancer.

== See also ==
- List of world super-middleweight boxing champions

Sporting positions
World boxing titles
Preceded by Richie Woodhall	WBC super middleweight champion 23 October 1999 – 6 May 2000	Succeeded by Glenn Catley
Preceded by Éric Lucas	WBC super middleweight champion 5 April 2003 – 5 June 2004	Succeeded by Cristian Sanavia
Preceded by Cristian Sanavia	WBC super middleweight champion 9 October 2004 – 14 October 2006	Succeeded by Mikkel Kessler
Super middleweight status
Preceded by Steve Little	Latest born world champion to die 3 December 2018 – present	Incumbent
