= Nikola Sjekloća =

Serbian and Montenegrin boxer

Personal information
- Nationality: Yugoslav → Montenegrin
- Born: 10 July 1978 (age 48) Niš, SR Serbia, Yugoslavia
- Height: 6 ft 2 in / 187cm
- Weight: 167Lb / 75kg

Boxing career

Boxing record
- Total fights: 43
- Wins: 37
- Win by KO: 12
- Losses: 5
- Draws: 1

Nikola Sjekloća (born 10 July 1978) is a Serbian-born Montenegrin professional boxer.

In 2003, he won the bronze medal in the 75 kg category at the 12th Senior World Boxing Championship in Bangkok, Thailand. He lost to Andy Lee of Limerick, Ireland at the European Championships in Pula, Croatia on 25 February 2004.

Nikola Sjekloća is a WBO International champion in the super middleweight division.

Sjekloća fought for interim WBC super middleweight title against Sakio Bika because of injured Andre Ward. However it was later changed and the fight was for number 1 contender that will fight for Andre Ward's World Boxing Council super middleweight title. Fight was promoted by Golden Boy Promotions and HBO and it was broadcast as one of the two main fights of the evening. It happened on 16 February 2013 in Boardwalk Hall, Atlantic City, New Jersey, USA. Sjekloća convincingly lost the fight by unanimous decision, and this fight was his first career loss.

== Titles ==
- 2008 WBC International Super Middleweight Title.
- 2008 WBC Mediterranean Super Middleweight Title.

== Professional boxing record ==
37 Wins (12 knockouts, 25 decisions), 5 Losses, 1 Draw
| Res. | Record | Opponent | Type | Rd | Date | Location | Notes |
| Win | 37–5–1 | (Croatia) Bosko Misic | TKO | 4 (8), 2:36 | 2020-12-18 | Sport Hall "Milan Gale Muskatirovic", Belgrade, Serbia | |
| Win | 36–5–1 | (Denmark) Jeppe Morell | SD | 8 | 2020-02-01 | Frederiksberghallen, Copenhagen, Denmark | |
| Win | 35–5–1 | (Portugal) Bruno Tavares | UD | 10 | 2018-12-15 | Mediterranean Sports Centre, Budva, Montenegro | |
| Win | 34–5–1 | (Netherlands) Farouk Daku | UD | 10 | 2018-06-30 | Budva, Montenegro | |
| Win | 33–5–1 | (Italy) Alex Marongiu | UD | 8 | 2018-03-11 | Sport Hall "Dordje Predin - Badza", Bečej, Serbia | |
| Loss | 32–5–1 | (United Kingdom) Anthony Yarde | TKO | 4 (10), 1:55 | 2017-12-09 | (United Kingdom) Copper Box Arena, London, England | For WBO European and Inter-Continental light heavyweight titles |
| Draw | 32–4–1 | (Germany) Robert Stieglitz | SD | 12 | 2017-03-18 | Arena Leipzig, Leipzig, Germany | For European super middleweight title |
| Win | 32–4 | (Serbia) Slobodan Culum | PTS | 6 | 2016-11-19 | Sport Hall "Dordje Predin - Badza", Bečej, Serbia | |
| Win | 31–4 | (Hungary) Balazs Horvath | TKO | 2 (8) | 2016-06-29 | Fortress Amphitheater, Niš, Serbia | |
| Win | 30–4 | (Croatia) Ivan Jukic | KO | 1 (12) | 2015-12-18 | Mediterranean Sports Centre, Budva, Montenegro | |
| Win | 29–4 | (Serbia) Slobodan Culum | TKO | 3 (6) | 2015-05-17 | Hala Moraca, Podgorica, Montenegro | |
| Loss | 28–4 | (Germany) Tyron Zeuge | UD | 12 | 2015-04-25 | Columbiahalle, Berlin, Germany | For IBF International super middleweight title |
| Loss | 28–3 | (United Kingdom) Callum Smith | UD | 12 | 2014-11-22 | (United Kingdom) Echo Arena, Liverpool, England | For WBC International super middleweight title |
| Win | 28–2 | (Uruguay) Jorge Rodriguez Olivera | UD | 8 | 2014-10-25 | Mediterranean Sports Centre, Budva, Montenegro | |
| Win | 27–2 | (Romania) Mugurel Sebe | TD | 3 (6), 3:00 | 2014-08-03 | Novalja, Croatia | |
| Loss | 26–2 | (Germany) Arthur Abraham | UD | 12 | 2014-05-03 | The Velodrom, Prenzlauer Berg, Berlin, Germany | For WBO super middleweight title |
| Win | 26–1 | (Serbia) Misa Nikolic | KO | 2 (8) | 2013-08-24 | Budva, Montenegro | |
| Loss | 25–1 | (Cameroon) Sakio Bika | UD | 12 | 2013-02-16 | (United States) Boardwalk Hall, Atlantic City, New Jersey, U.S. | |
| Win | 25–0 | (France) Hadillah Mohoumadi | PTS | 10 | 2012-07-24 | Budva, Montenegro | |
| Win | 24–0 | (Bosnia and Herzegovina) Nikola Matic | PTS | 6 | 2012-03-24 | Niksic, Montenegro | |
| Win | 23–0 | (South Africa) Peter Mashamaite | MD | 12 (12) | 2011-11-26 | Podgorica, Montenegro | Retained WBC International super middleweight title |
| Win | 22–0 | (Hungary) Titusz Szabo | KO | 3 (6) | 2011-09-09 | Stadion Malih Sportova, Nikšić, Montenegro | |
| Win | 21–0 | (Armenia) Khoren Gevor | UD | 12 | 2011-07-25 | EWS Arena, Göppingen, Germany | Retained WBC International super middleweight title |
| Win | 20–0 | (Germany) Christian Pohle | KO | 6 (8) | 2011-04-29 | Hala Moraca, Podgorica, Montenegro | |
| Win | 19–0 | (Spain) Roberto Santos | UD | 12 | 2011-02-25 | Hotel PARK, Novi Sad, Serbia | Retained WBC International super middleweight title |
| Win | 18–0 | (Croatia) Gordan Glisic | PTS | 8 | 2010-10-02 | Hala KK Bora, Cacak, Serbia | |
| Win | 17–0 | (Ukraine) Roman Shkarupa | UD | 12 | 2010-05-29 | Mediterranean Sports Centre, Budva, Montenegro | Won vacant WBC International super middleweight title |
| Win | 16–0 | (Russia) Artem Vychkin | UD | 6 | 2010-02-25 | Markstadt, Chelyabinsk, Russia | |
| Win | 15–0 | (Italy) Lorenzo Cosseddu | UD | 12 | 2009-10-03 | Sport Hall, Budva, Montenegro | Retained WBC Mediterranean super middleweight title |
| Win | 14–0 | (Croatia) Bojan Miskovic | KO | 2 (4), 1:10 | 2009-04-29 | Hala Sumice, Belgrade, Serbia | |
| Win | 13–0 | (Croatia) Josip Jalusic | PTS | 6 | 2008-12-13 | Hala Borik, Banja Luka, Bosnia and Herzegovina | |
| Win | 12–0 | (France) Pierre Moreno | TKO | 10 (12), 2:15 | 2008-10-18 | Sport Hall, Budva, Montenegro | Retained WBC Mediterranean super middleweight title |
| Win | 11–0 | (Serbia) Mile Nikolic | UD | 6 | 2008-06-28 | Gradski stadion, Banja Luka, Bosnia and Herzegovina | |
| Win | 10–0 | (Italy) Roberto Cocco | PTS | 12 | 2008-05-03 | Sport Hall, Budva, Montenegro | Won vacant WBC Mediterranean super middleweight title |
| Win | 9–0 | (Serbia) Misa Nikolic | PTS | 6 | 2008-02-26 | Amphitheatre Pionirski Grad, Belgrade, Serbia | |
| Win | 8–0 | (France) Tony Averlant | UD | 8 | 2008-01-26 | Hall of Sports, Belgrade, Serbia | |
| Win | 7–0 | (Romania) Costantin Marian Armenga | KO | 2 (6), 1:20 | 2007-12-14 | Hala Borik, Banja Luka, Bosnia and Herzegovina | |
| Win | 6–0 | (Slovakia) Robert Andrasik | PTS | 6 | 2007-08-19 | Doboj, Bosnia and Herzegovina | |
| Win | 5–0 | (Croatia) Ivica Cukusic | PTS | 6 | 2007-04-26 | Spens Sports Center, Novi Sad, Serbia | |
| Win | 4–0 | (Belarus) Aliaksandr Vaiavoda | TKO | 4 (6), 1:21 | 2007-04-14 | Hala Moraca, Podgorica, Montenegro | |
| Win | 3–0 | (Bosnia and Herzegovina) Dzemal Mahmic | PTS | 6 | 2007-03-10 | Hala Zdravlje, Leskovac, Serbia | |
| Win | 2–0 | (Germany) Tanju Guenes | TKO | 1 (6) | 2006-10-14 | Hala Borik, Banja Luka, Bosnia and Herzegovina | |
| Win | 1–0 | (Croatia) Ivica Cukusic | PTS | 6 | 2006-07-15 | Bazen Rondo, Budva, Montenegro | |
