= Andrea Di Luisa =

Italian boxer

Personal information
- Nationality: Italian
- Born: 13 May 1982 (age 44) Naples, Campania, Italy
- Height: 1.82 m (6 ft 0 in)
- Weight: Super-middleweight; Light-heavyweight

Boxing career
- Stance: Orthodox

Boxing record
- Total fights: 23
- Wins: 19
- Win by KO: 14
- Losses: 4

Andrea Di Luisa (born 13 May 1982) is an Italian professional boxer who held the [wbf intercontinenta)2009 to 2010 [FPI champion Itay]2010 to 2012 Super Middle [WBC International Silver]2011 to 2012 Super MiddleEuropean Union super-middleweight title from 2013 to 2015.

== Professional career ==
Di Luisa made his professional debut on 30 October 2008, scoring a fourth-round stoppage over Giuseppe Loffredo, who also debuted. All of Di Luisa's next ten fights were won by stoppage or knockout. On 20 May 2011, he won his first regional championship—the vacant WBC Silver International super-middleweight title—via unanimous decision over Ruben Eduardo Acosta. In his following fight, on 11 November 2011, Di Luisa suffered his first professional loss when he was stopped in the twelfth and final round by Mouhamed Ali Ndiaye. This would be Di Luisa's first of three attempts at winning the European Union super-middleweight title. His next attempt, almost exactly a year later on 23 November 2012, was also unsuccessful: this time he lost via corner retirement to Christopher Rebrasse.

On 20 December 2014, the third attempt would be the charm for Di Luisa, as he stopped Roberto Cocco in eleven rounds to win the vacant European Union super-middleweight title. This was a rematch from their first bout, which took place on 9 April 2010. Having vacated the title, Di Luisa next fought former super-middleweight world champion Lucian Bute on 15 August 2015, but was stopped in four rounds. On 30 January 2016, Di Luisa was stopped in five rounds by George Groves.

== Professional boxing record ==
24 fights	20 wins	4 losses
By knockout	14	4
By decision	6	0

No.	Result	Record	Opponent	Type	Round, time	Date	Location	Notes
23	Win	19–4	Djordje Markovic	SD	6	23 Feb 2018	Palazzetto dello Sport, Rome, Italy	
22	Win	18–4	Mattia Scaccia	TKO	1 (6)	17 Jun 2017	Casino de la Vallée, Saint-Vincent, Italy	
21	Loss	17–4	George Groves	TKO	5 (12), 1:55	30 Jan 2016	Copper Box Arena, London, England	
20	Win	17–3	Gabor Zsalek	KO	2 (6), 1:25	5 Dec 2015	PalaOzan, Ugento, Italy	
19	Loss	16–3	Lucian Bute	TKO	4 (10), 1:53	15 Aug 2015	Bell Centre, Montreal, Quebec, Canada	
18	Win	16–2	Roberto Cocco	TKO	11 (12), 0:01	25 May 2013	Palazzetto dello Sport, Rome, Italy	Won vacant European Union super-middleweight title
17	Win	15–2	Ruslans Pojonisevs	PTS	6	25 Jan 2014	Palazzetto dello Sport, Tolfa, Italy	
16	Win	14–2	Marko Benzon	PTS	6	22 Nov 2013	Palazzetto dello Sport, Frontino, Italy	
15	Loss	13–2	Christopher Rebrassé	RTD	7 (12), 3:00	23 Nov 2012	PalaMalè, Viterbo, Italy	For vacant European Union super-middleweight title
14	Win	13–1	Luciano Lombardi	DQ	4 (10)	25 May 2012	Montefiascone, Italy	Retained Italy super-middleweight title
13	Loss	12–1	Mouhamed Ali Ndiaye	TKO	12 (12)	11 Nov 2011	Palazzetto dello Sport, Pontedera, Italy	For vacant European Union super-middleweight title
12	Win	12–0	Ruben Eduardo Acosta	UD	12	20 May 2011	PalaMalè, Viterbo, Italy	Won vacant WBC Silver International super-middleweight title
11	Win	11–0	Norbert Szekeres	TKO	2 (6)	16 Dec 2010	PalaZumbo, Brindisi, Italy	
10	Win	10–0	Giuseppe Brischetto	TKO	2 (10)	15 Oct 2010	Pala Malè, Viterbo, Italy	Retained Italy super-middleweight title
9	Win	9–0	Janos Olah	TKO	1 (6)	16 Jul 2010	Cieloverde, Marina di Grosseto, Italy	
8	Win	8–0	Roberto Cocco	KO	1 (10), 0:41	4 Apr 2010	Pala Malè, Viterbo, Italy	Won vacant Italy super-middleweight title
7	Win	7–0	Alessio Furlan	TKO	8 (8), 2:38	12 Dec 2009	Palazzetto dello Sport di Via Austria, Grosseto, Italy	
6	Win	6–0	Alessio Rondelli	TKO	6 (12)	25 Sep 2009	Geovillage, Olbia, Italy	Won WBF (Foundation) Intercontinental light-heavyweight title
5	Win	5–0	Endrit Vuka	TKO	2 (6)	17 Jul 2009	Stadio Matusa, Frosinone, Italy	
4	Win	4–0	Juan Carlos Muntane	TKO	1 (6)	26 Jun 2009	Piazza dei Rioni, Porto Santo Stefano, Italy	
3	Win	3–0	Gyula Gaspar	TKO	1 (6), 1:42	20 Feb 2009	Palazzetto dello Sport, Frosinone, Italy	
2	Win	2–0	Lajos Orsos	KO	1 (6), 2:48	19 Dec 2008	Palazzetto dello Sport di Via Austria, Grosseto, Italy	
1	Win	1–0	Giuseppe Loffredo	TKO	4 (6)	30 Oct 2008	Palazzetto dello Sport, Savigliano, Italy	Professional debut

Sporting positions
Regional boxing titles
Preceded by Alessio Rondelli	WBF (Foundation) Intercontinental light-heavyweight champion 25 September 2009 – 2011; Vacated	Vacant Title next held by Miguel Velozo
Vacant Title last held by Mouhamed Ali Ndiaye	Italy super-middleweight champion 9 April 2010 – December 2012; Vacated	Vacant Title next held by Roberto Cocco
New title	WBC International Silver super-middleweight champion 20 May 2011 – December 2011; Vacated	Vacant Title next held by Julius Jackson
Vacant Title last held by Roberto Cocco	Italy super-middleweight champion 27 September 2014 – January 2015; Vacated	Vacant Title next held by Roberto Bassi
Vacant Title last held by Mariano Hilario	European Union super-middleweight champion 20 December 2014 – August 2015; Vacated	Vacant Title next held by Mariano Hilario
