= Hadillah Mohoumadi =

French boxer

Personal information
- Nationality: French
- Born: 11 August 1980 (age 45)
- Height: 1.81 m (5 ft 11 in)
- Weight: Super-middleweight

Boxing career
- Stance: Orthodox

Boxing record
- Total fights: 29
- Wins: 23
- Win by KO: 16
- Losses: 5
- Draws: 1

Hadillah Mohoumadi (born 11 August 1980) is a French professional boxer who has held the European super-middleweight title twice between 2015 and 2018.

== Professional career ==
Mohoumadi made his professional debut on 19 December 2008, scoring a third-round stoppage over Daniel Pavelescu. On 22 October 2010, Mohoumadi suffered his first loss to Cristian Sanavia in an eight-round points decision. Having fought mainly in France, the first opportunity for Mohoumadi to fight for a major regional title came on 13 October 2012, against European super-middleweight champion James DeGale, who won a hard-fought unanimous decision (UD).

Mohoumadi would score four wins in 2013, but spent the following year inactive as he chose to wait for a second chance at the European super-middleweight title. This finally arrived on 29 May 2015, when Mohoumadi stopped Mariano Hilario in eight rounds to win the vacant title. In his first defence as champion, on 2 April 2016, Mohoumadi was stopped in one round by undefeated challenger Callum Smith. Smith would later vacate the title, with Mohoumadi regaining it on 5 May 2017 after a UD against Mariano Hilario.

== Professional boxing record ==
28 fights	22 wins	5 losses
By knockout	16	1
By decision	6	4
Draws	1	

No.	Result	Record	Opponent	Type	Round, time	Date	Location	Notes
29	Loss	22–5–1	Nadjib Mohammedi	UD	12	30 Mar 2018	Palais des sports Marcel-Cerdan, Levallois-Perret, France	For vacant WBA Continental (Europe) super-middleweight title
28	Win	22–4–1	Christopher Rebrassé	UD	12	11 Nov 2017	Vélodrome de Saint-Quentin-en-Yvelines, Montigny-le-Bretonneux, France	Retained European super-middleweight title
27	Win	21–4–1	Mariano Hilario	UD	12	5 May 2017	Palacio Vistalegre, Madrid, Spain	Won vacant European super-middleweight title
26	Win	20–4–1	Ruslan Schelev	TKO	8 (8)	17 Dec 2016	Gymnase du Clos de l'Arche, Noisy-le-Grand, France	
25	Loss	19–4–1	Callum Smith	TKO	1 (12), 1:41	2 Apr 2016	Echo Arena, Liverpool, England	Lost European super-middleweight title
24	Win	19–3–1	Ericles Torres Marin	TKO	1 (10)	28 Nov 2015	Palazzetto le Cupole, Turin, Italy	
23	Win	18–3–1	Mariano Hilario	TKO	8 (12)	29 May 2015	Polideportivo Fernando Martín, Fuenlabrada, Spain	Won vacant European super-middleweight title
22	Win	17–3–1	Bartlomiej Grafka	TKO	5 (6)	30 Nov 2013	Esplanade de Paris, Cergy-Pontoise, France	
21	Win	17–3–1	Raimonds Sniedze	TKO	1 (6)	17 Oct 2013	Palace de Villiers, Sarcelles, France	
20	Win	16–3–1	Paweł Głażewski	TKO	7 (12), 1:36	29 Jun 2013	Amfiteatr, Ostróda, Poland	
19	Win	15–3–1	Cedric Bellais	UD	10	19 Jan 2013	Palais de sports, Élancourt, France	Retained France super-middleweight title
18	Loss	14–3–1	James DeGale	UD	12	13 Oct 2012	Bluewater, Stone, England	For European super-middleweight title
17	Loss	14–2–1	Nikola Sjekloća	PTS	10	24 Jul 2012	Budva, Montenegro	
16	Win	14–1–1	Hugo Kasperski	UD	10	2 Jun 2012	Palais de sports, Élancourt, France	Won vacant France super-middleweight title
15	Win	13–1–1	Juan Martinez	RTD	2 (6), 3:00	5 May 2012	Élancourt, France	
14	Win	12–1–1	Roman Vanicky	TKO	3 (6)	3 Mar 2012	Complexe Sportif Europe, Élancourt, France	
13	Win	11–1–1	Kiril Psonko	TKO	3 (6)	30 Sep 2011	Salle Dubois Crancé, Charleville-Mézières, France	
12	Win	10–1–1	Anouar Boumejjane	TKO	5 (8)	25 Jun 2011	Complexe Sportif Europe, Saint-Quentin-en-Yvelines, France	
11	Win	9–1–1	Mounir Sahli	RTD	4 (8)	14 May 2011	Complexe Sportif Europe, Élancourt, France	
10	Win	8–1–1	Yoann Bloyer	TKO	1 (8)	26 Mar 2011	Complexe Sportif Europe, Élancourt, France	
9	Loss	7–1–1	Cristian Sanavia	PTS	8	22 Oct 2010	Palazzetto dello Sport Arcella, Padua, Italy	
8	Win	7–0–1	Parfait Tindani	TKO	4 (6)	3 Jul 2010	Parc des Expositions, Mantes-la-Ville, France	
7	Win	6–0–1	Cedric Bellais	TKO	6 (6)	8 May 2010	Palais de sports, Élancourt, France	
6	Win	5–0–1	Adel Belhachemi	PTS	6	30 Mar 2010	Salle des Congrès, Saint-Junien, France	
5	Win	4–0–1	Jean Marc Ismael	TKO	5 (6)	12 June 2009	Gymnase de Bastillac, Tarbes, France	
4	Draw	3–0–1	Karim Achour	PTS	4	23 Mar 2009	Salle Gymnase Gilbert Lavoine, Laon, France	
3	Win	3–0	Karim Achour	PTS	4	13 Mar 2009	Gymnase Paul Mahier, Trappes, France	
2	Win	2–0	Keven Monjal	PTS	4	21 Feb 2009	Salle Don Guillaume, Chambray-lès-Tours, France	
1	Win	1–0	Daniel Pavelescu	TKO	3 (4)	12 Dec 2008	Complexe Sportif Europe, Élancourt, France	

Sporting positions
Regional boxing titles
Vacant Title last held by Christopher Rebrassé	France super-middleweight champion 2 June 2012 – 2013; Vacated	Vacant Title next held by Bilel Latreche
Vacant Title last held by George Groves	European super-middleweight champion 29 May 2015 – 2 April 2016	Succeeded by Callum Smith
Vacant Title last held by Callum Smith	European super-middleweight champion 5 May 2017 – June 2018; Vacated	Vacant Title next held by Robin Krasniqi
