= Alberto Colajanni =

Italian boxer (born 1973)

Personal information
- Nationality: Italian
- Born: 3 December 1973 (age 52) Sestri Levante, Liguria, Italy
- Height: 181 cm (5 ft 11 in)
- Weight: Super-middleweight

Boxing career
- Stance: Orthodox

Boxing record
- Total fights: 19
- Wins: 18
- Win by KO: 2
- Losses: 1

Alberto Colajanni (born 3 December 1973) is an Italian former professional boxer who competed from 1999 to 2006. He challenged for the WBC super-middleweight title in 2006.

== Professional career ==
Colajanni held the Italian super-middleweight title between 2002 and 2004 and the IBF International title between 2004 and 2005. After losing his first world title shot against WBC champion Markus Beyer in January 2006, Colajanni retired with a record of 18 wins (2 by knockout) and 1 loss.

== Professional boxing record ==
19 fights	18 wins	1 loss
By knockout	2	1
By decision	16	0

No.	Result	Record	Opponent	Type	Round, time	Date	Location	Notes
19	Loss	18–1	(Germany) Markus Beyer	TKO	12 (12), 2:12	28 Jan 2006	Tempodrom, Berlin, Germany	For WBC super-middleweight title
18	Win	18–0	(Hungary) Roland Horvath	PTS	6	22 Jul 2005	Palasport Concetto Lo Bello, Syracuse, Italy	
17	Win	17–0	(Croatia) Ivica Cukusic	PTS	6	21 Mar 2005	San Mango d'Aquino, Italy	
16	Win	16–0	(France) Pierre Moreno	UD	12	27 Nov 2004	Pala Carrino, Genoa, Italy	Won vacant IBF International super-middleweight title
15	Win	15–0	(Czech Republic) Radek Hrabak	PTS	6	2 Oct 2004	Palasport, Grosseto, Italy	
14	Win	14–0	(Italy) Alessandro Filippo	UD	10	18 Jun 2004	Bonassola, Italy	Retained Italian super-middleweight title
13	Win	13–0	(Italy) Vincenzo Imparato	UD	10	26 Dec 2003	Grosseto, Italy	Retained Italian super-middleweight title
12	Win	12–0	(Italy) Alessandro Filippo	TKO	8 (10), 1:58	4 Jul 2003	Deiva Marina, Italy	Retained Italian super-middleweight title
11	Win	11–0	(Italy) Vincenzo Imparato	UD	10	19 Jul 2002	Marina di Grosseto, Italy	Won Italian super-middleweight title
10	Win	10–0	(Hungary) Balazs Szabo	PTS	6	26 Jan 2002	Aulla, Italy	
9	Win	9–0	(Italy) Maurizio Colombo	PTS	6	26 Oct 2001	Cremona, Italy	
8	Win	8–0	(Hungary) Balazs Szabo	PTS	6	28 Sep 2001	Deiva Marina, Italy	
7	Win	7–0	(Belgium) Mustapha Stini	PTS	6	4 Aug 2001	Chiavari, Italy	
6	Win	6–0	(Italy) Marco Dell'Uomo	PTS	6	22 Jun 2001	Marina di Grosseto, Italy	
5	Win	5–0	(Italy) Gianluca Tamburrini	PTS	6	9 Mar 2001	Tarquinia, Italy	
4	Win	4–0	(Italy) Enrico Speri	PTS	6	24 Nov 2000	Tarquinia, Italy	
3	Win	3–0	(Hungary) Andras Sulak	PTS	6	9 Jun 2000	Lavagna, Italy	
2	Win	2–0	(Romania) Petru Butnariu	TKO	1 (6)	3 Mar 2000	Syracuse, Italy	
1	Win	1–0	(Slovenia) Norbert Miklos	PTS	6	3 Dec 1999	Avezzano, Italy	

Sporting positions
Regional boxing titles
Preceded by Vincenzo Imparato	Italian super-middleweight champion 19 July 2002 – September 2004; Vacated	Vacant Title next held by Vincenzo Imparato
New title	IBF International super-middleweight champion 27 November 2004 – May 2005; Vacated	Vacant Title next held by Mouhamed Ali Ndiaye
