= Mouhamed Ali Ndiaye =

Italian boxer

Personal information
- Nickname: The Black Power
- Nationality: Italian
- Born: 26 October 1979 (age 47) Pikine, Dakar Region, Senegal
- Height: 1.82 m (6 ft 0 in)
- Weight: Super-middleweight

Boxing career
- Stance: Orthodox

Boxing record
- Total fights: 28
- Wins: 24
- Win by KO: 13
- Losses: 3
- Draws: 1

Mouhamed Ali Ndiaye (born 26 October 1979) is an Italian professional boxer. He is a former European Union super-middleweight champion and has challenged twice for the European super-middleweight title.

== Professional career ==
Born in Senegal but based in Italy throughout his career, Ndiaye made his professional debut on 1 October 2005, scoring a fourth-round knockout against Thomas Dodoo. From 2006 to 2007, Ndiaye won three regional IBF super-middleweight titles. His first opportunity at fighting for a major regional championship—the European Union super-middleweight title—was on 14 March 2008, which ended in a split decision loss to Lolenga Mock.

On 11 November 2011, Ndiaye scored a late twelfth-round stoppage against Andrea Di Luisa to win the now-vacant European Union super-middleweight title on his second attempt. One defence of this title was made in a ninth-round corner stoppage over Jose Maria Guerrero on 26 May 2012. Ndiaye fought to a controversial split draw with Christopher Rebrassé on 8 June 2013, with the vacant European super-middleweight title on the line. In their EBU-mandated rematch on 22 March 2014, Rebrassé won the aforementioned title by stopping Ndiaye in four rounds.

== Professional boxing record ==
28 fights	24 wins	3 losses
By knockout	13	1
By decision	11	2
Draws	1	

No.	Result	Record	Opponent	Type	Round, time	Date	Location	Notes
28	Loss	24–3–1	Giovanni De Carolis	UD	12	2 May 2015	Palasport Flaminio, Rimini, Italy	For IBF Inter-Continental super-middleweight title
27	Win	24–2–1	Norbert Szekeres	PTS	6	24 Jan 2015	Centro sportivo piscine Italcementi, Bergamo, Italy	
26	Loss	23–2–1	Christopher Rebrassé	TKO	4 (12)	22 Mar 2014	Palazzetto dello Sport, Pontedera, Italy	For vacant European super-middleweight title
25	Draw	23–1–1	Christopher Rebrassé	SD	12	8 Jun 2013	PalaPentassuglia, Brindisi, Italy	For vacant European super-middleweight title
24	Win	23–1	Jevgenijs Andrejevs	PTS	6	23 Mar 2013	Abano Terme, Italy	
23	Win	12–1	Jose Maria Guerrero	RTD	9 (12), 3:00	26 May 2012	Palazzetto dello Sport, Quartu Sant'Elena, Italy	Retained European Union super-middleweight title
22	Win	21–1	Andrea Di Luisa	TKO	12 (12)	11 Nov 2011	Palazzetto dello Sport, Pontedera, Italy	Won vacant European Union super-middleweight title
21	Win	20–1	Pavels Lotahs	KO	2 (6)	16 Jul 2011	Horse Country Resort, Arborea, Italy	
20	Win	19–1	Ruslans Pojonisevs	UD	6	15 Apr 2011	Palazzetto dello Sport, Capoterra, Italy	
19	Win	18–1	Sandor Ramocsa	PTS	6	4 Dec 2010	Palazzetto dello Sport, Decimomannu, Italy	
18	Win	17–1	Raul Asencio	TKO	5 (6)	7 May 2010	Palasport di Via D'Azeglio, Selargius, Italy	
17	Win	16–1	Jevgenijs Andrejevs	UD	8	29 Jan 2010	Palazzetto dello Sport, Pontedera, Italy	
16	Win	15–1	Mounir Sahli	KO	2 (6)	27 Mar 2009	Palazzetto dello Sport, Palestrina, Italy	
15	Win	14–1	Roberto Cocco	UD	10	10 Oct 2008	Palazzetto dello Sport, Pontedera, Italy	Won vacant Italy super-middleweight title
14	Loss	13–1	Lolenga Mock	SD	12	14 Mar 2008	Idrætshal, Odense, Denmark	For vacant European Union super-middleweight title
13	Win	13–0	Houssein Hammouch	TKO	2 (6)	22 Dec 2007	Palestra ITIS Marconi, Latina, Italy	
12	Win	12–0	Sergey Kharchenko	UD	12	26 Jun 2007	Ponte Milvio, Rome, Italy	Retained IBF International super-middleweight title
11	Win	11–0	Sergey Khomitsky	UD	12	9 Mar 2007	Palazzetto Lagrange, Rome, Italy	Won vacant IBF International super-middleweight title
10	Win	10–0	Ilir Mustafa	TKO	5 (12)	15 Dec 2006	Teatro Tendastrisce, Rome, Italy	Won vacant IBF Mediterranean super-middleweight title
9	Win	9–0	Serhiy Demchenko	SD	10	10 Nov 2006	Palazzetto dello Sport, Pontedera, Italy	Won vacant IBF Youth super-middleweight title
8	Win	8–0	Zoran Plavsic	TKO	3 (6)	27 Oct 2006	Pomezia, Italy	
7	Win	7–0	Jevgenijs Andrejevs	PTS	8	14 Jul 2006	Stadio della Pallacorda, Rome, Italy	
6	Win	6–0	Matteo Sciacca	TKO	3 (6)	9 Jun 2006	Stadio della Pallacorda, Rome, Italy	
5	Win	5–0	Andriy Romanko	KO	5 (6)	25 Mar 2006	Palazzetto dello Sport, Rome, Italy	
4	Win	4–0	Mihai Iorgu	KO	5 (6)	4 Mar 2006	Rome, Italy	
3	Win	3–0	Mario Lupp	TKO	4 (6)	26 Dec 2005	Palazzetto dello Sport, Rome, Italy	
2	Win	2–0	Azedine Djerari	PTS	6	28 Oct 2005	Rome, Italy	
1	Win	1–0	Thomas Dodoo	KO	4 (4)	1 Oct 2005	Santa Croce sull'Arno, Italy	Professional debut

Sporting positions
Regional boxing titles
Vacant Title last held by Martin Nielsen	IBF Youth super-middleweight champion 11 November 2006 – December 2006; Vacated	Vacant Title next held by Bilel Latreche
New title	IBF Mediterranean super-middleweight champion 15 December 2006 – March 2007; Vacated	Vacant Title next held by Luciano Lombardi
Vacant Title last held by Alberto Colajanni	IBF International super-middleweight champion 9 March 2007 – ? Vacated	Vacant Title next held by Luca Tassi
Vacant Title last held by Luca Tassi	Italy super-middleweight champion 10 October 2008 – ? Vacated	Vacant Title next held by Andrea Di Luisa
Vacant Title last held by Lolenga Mock	European Union super-middleweight champion 11 November 2011 – 2012; Vacated	Vacant Title next held by Christopher Rebrassé
