= Lolenga Mock =

Danish boxer

Personal information
- Nickname: Lumumba Boy
- Nationality: Danish
- Born: 22 April 1972 (age 54) Kinshasa, Zaire (now DR Congo)
- Height: 1.80 cm (1 in)
- Weight: Super-middleweight; Light-heavyweight

Boxing career
- Stance: Orthodox

Boxing record
- Total fights: 60
- Wins: 43
- Win by KO: 13
- Losses: 16
- Draws: 1

Lolenga Mock (born 22 April 1972) is a Danish professional boxer. He held the European Union super-middleweight title three times between 2006 and 2011. A veteran of the sport for more than 25 years, Mock is known for his toughness and has only ever been stopped once in his career.

== Professional career ==
Born in Zaire (now the Democratic Republic of the Congo), Mock made his professional debut on 11 May 1991, fighting in several countries across Africa and winning his first seventeen fights. In 2000 he fought in Europe for the first time, where he would later become a Danish citizen. On 26 September 2003, he fought future world champion David Haye at cruiserweight. Despite scoring a knockdown against Haye in the second round, Mock was stopped in the fourth. A fight against another future world champion came against Lucian Bute on 16 May 2006, which ended in a twelve-round unanimous decision loss for Mock.

On 3 November 2006, Mock won his first major regional championship—the vacant European Union super-middleweight title—when he defeated Franck Mezaache via fifth-round corner stoppage. Having vacated the title after one defence, Mock won it twice more on 14 March 2008 and 30 January 2010, against Mouhamed Ali Ndiaye and Giovanni De Carolis respectively. In 2016, Mock had his busiest ever year as a professional, having six fights in Denmark and winning each time.

== Professional boxing record ==
60 fights	43 wins	16 losses
By knockout	13	1
By decision	30	15
Draws	1	

No.	Result	Record	Opponent	Type	Round, time	Date	Location	Notes
60	Win	43–16–1	Mateo Damian Veron	SD	12	18 May 2019	Viby hallen, Aarhus, Denmark	Won vacant IBA super-middleweight title
59	Loss	42–16–1	Mateo Damian Veron	UD	8	19 Jan 2019	Struer Arena, Struer, Denmark	
58	Loss	42–15–1	Avni Yıldırım	MD	12	15 Sep 2018	Friedrich-Ebert-Halle, Ludwigshafen, Germany	For vacant WBC International super-middleweight title
57	Win	42–14–1	Dmitry Chudinov	UD	10	5 Jan 2018	Frederiksberghallen, Copenhagen, Denmark	
56	Win	41–14–1	Roman Shkarupa	UD	10	28 Oct 2017	Frederiksberghallen, Copenhagen, Denmark	
55	Win	40–14–1	Luke Blackledge	UD	10	17 Jun 2017	Aarhus, Denmark	
54	Win	39–14–1	Derek Edwards	SD	10	7 Apr 2017	Frederiksberghallen, Copenhagen, Denmark	
53	Win	38–14–1	Ruben Eduardo Acosta	UD	10	3 Dec 2016	Ceres Arena, Aarhus, Denmark	
52	Win	37–14–1	Nicolas Dion	UD	10	29 Oct 2016	Frederiksberghallen, Copenhagen, Denmark	
51	Win	36–14–1	Derrick Findley	UD	10	16 Sep 2016	Frederiksberghallen, Copenhagen, Denmark	
50	Win	35–14–1	Patrick Mendy	MD	10	4 Jun 2016	Frederiksberghallen, Copenhagen, Denmark	
49	Win	34–14–1	David Zegarra	UD	10	29 Apr 2016	Frederiksberghallen, Copenhagen, Denmark	
48	Win	33–14–1	Jorge Silva	KO	7 (10), 2:59	26 Feb 2016	Ceres Arena, Aarhus, Denmark	
47	Win	32–14–1	Alessandro Sinacore	MD	10	4 Dec 2015	Herlev Hallerne, Herlev, Denmark	
46	Loss	31–14–1	Erik Skoglund	UD	12	19 Oct 2013	Kolding Hallen, Kolding, Denmark	For vacant European Union light-heavyweight title
45	Win	31–13–1	Patrick Dobroschi	UD	8	1 Feb 2013	ISS Dome, Düsseldorf, Germany	
44	Loss	30–13–1	Dawid Kostecki	UD	10	25 Jun 2011	Hala Podpromie, Rzeszów, Poland	For WBC Baltic and vacant WBA Inter-Continental light-heavyweight titles
43	Win	30–12–1	Lorenzo Di Giacomo	UD	12	22 Dec 2010	Sport Park, Penne, Italy	Retained European Union super-middleweight title
42	Win	29–12–1	Giovanni De Carolis	MD	12	30 Jan 2010	NRGi Arena, Aarhus, Denmark	Won vacant European Union super-middleweight title
41	Loss	28–12–1	Gabriel Campillo	UD	12	3 Mar 2009	Holmegårdsskolen, Kokkedal, Denmark	Lost European Union super-middleweight title
40	Win	28–11–1	Mouhamed Ali Ndiaye	SD	12	14 Mar 2008	Idrætshal, Odense, Denmark	Won vacant European Union super-middleweight title
39	Loss	27–11–1	Stjepan Božić	UD	12	2 Aug 2007	Pag, Croatia	For vacant WBA Inter-Continental super-middleweight title
38	Win	27–9–1	Djamel Selini	KO	9 (12), 0:44	24 Mar 2007	Parken Stadium, Copenhagen, Denmark	Retained European Union super-middleweight title
37	Win	26–9–1	Franck Mezaache	RTD	5 (12), 3:00	3 Nov 2006	Skive Hallerne, Skive, Denmark	Won vacant European Union super-middleweight title
36	Loss	25–10–1	Lucian Bute	UD	12	16 May 2006	Bell Centre, Montreal, Quebec, Canada	Lost WBO Inter-Continental super-middleweight title
35	Win	25–8–1	Yuri Tsarenka	UD	12	4 Nov 2005	Silkeborg-Hallerne, Silkeborg, Denmark	Retained WBO Inter-Continental super-middleweight title
34	Win	24–8–1	Charles Brewer	TKO	10 (12), 2:58	15 Apr 2005	K.B. Hallen, Copenhagen, Denmark	Won vacant WBO Inter-Continental super-middleweight title
33	Win	23–8–1	Giovanni Alvarez	KO	3 (12), 0:42	12 Nov 2004	Brøndby Hall, Brøndby, Denmark	Won vacant EBA light-heavyweight title
32	Loss	22–9–1	Mario Veit	UD	8	21 Sep 2004	Universum Gym, Hamburg, Germany	
31	Loss	22–8–1	Malik Dziarra	MD	10	21 Feb 2004	Ballhaus Aschersleben, Aschersleben, Germany	
30	Win	22–7–1	Juraj Ondricko	TKO	2	18 Dec 2003	IFCO Gym, Berlin, Germany	
29	Loss	21–7–1	David Haye	TKO	4 (6), 2:30	26 Sep 2003	Rivermead Leisure Centre, Reading, England	
28	Loss	21–6–1	Kai Kurzawa	UD	8	16 Aug 2003	Nürburgring, Nürburg, Germany	
27	Loss	21–5–1	Lasse Johansen	UD	6	11 Oct 2002	Thy Hallen, Thisted, Denmark	
26	Draw	21–4–1	Peter Odhiambo	PTS	6	16 Jun 2001	City Council Hall, Nairobi, Kenya	
25	Loss	21–4	Soon Botes	PTS	8	16 Sep 2000	Grand Regency Hotel, Nairobi, Kenya	
24	Loss	21–3	Jesper Kristiansen	UD	6	9 Sep 2000	Jetsmark Hallen, Pandrup, Denmark	
23	Win	21–2	Paul Otewa	TKO	6	20 Nov 1999	Nyayo National Stadium, Nairobi, Kenya	
22	Win	20–2	Lucas Omondi	TKO	1	1 Oct 1999	Tanga, Tanzania	
21	Loss	19–2	Simon Mokoena	PTS	8	28 Apr 1999	City Hall, Benoni, South Africa	
20	Win	19–1	Ali Said	TKO	2	1 Jan 1999	City Stadium, Nairobi, Kenya	
19	Win	18–1	Lucas Omondi	PTS	10	19 Dec 1998	City Hall, Nairobi, Kenya	Won vacant East & Central African super-middleweight title
18	Loss	17–1	Joseph Marwa	PTS	12	9 Aug 1998	Dar es Salaam, Tanzania	For ABU super-middleweight title
17	Win	17–0	Fred Otinda	PTS	8	7 Dec 1997	Dar es Salaam, Tanzania	
16	Win	16–0	Mohamed Orungi	PTS	8	15 Oct 1997	Nairobi, Kenya	
15	Win	15–0	Fred Otinda	PTS	8	26 Apr 1997	Nairobi, Kenya	
14	Win	14–0	Kalo Mogaho	KO	8 (10)	3 Jul 1996	DR Congo	
13	Win	13–0	Joe John	PTS	8	1 Feb 1996	Nairobi, Kenya	
12	Win	12–0	Lawrence Jaoko	KO	3	4 Jul 1995	Eldoret, Kenya	
11	Win	11–0	Paul Otewa	PTS	4	6 Apr 1995	Nairobi, Kenya	
10	Win	10–0	Fred Otinda	PTS	4	11 Mar 1995	Nairobi, Kenya	
9	Win	9–0	Abdul Amidou	PTS	10	10 May 1994	Kampala, Uganda	
8	Win	8–0	Ahmed Kamel Djerbal	PTS	8	2 Mar 1994	Kinshasa, DR Congo	
7	Win	7–0	Mbakala Lusaka	PTS	10	10 Oct 1993	Kinshasa, DR Congo	
6	Win	6–0	Mbakala Lusaka	PTS	10	2 Jun 1992	Kinshasa, DR Congo	
5	Win	5–0	Abubacar Betton	KO	10 (10)	22 Feb 1993	Abidjan, Ivory Coast	
4	Win	4–0	Abubacar Betton	PTS	8	9 Aug 1992	Kisangani, DR Congo	
3	Win	3–0	Bovic Malesi	PTS	8	3 Apr 1992	Kisangani, DR Congo	
2	Win	2–0	Soki Said	KO	6 (10)	5 Nov 1991	Kisangani, DR Congo	
1	Win	1–0	Yaaman Kabeya	PTS	6	11 May 1991	Kisangani, DR Congo	

Sporting positions
Regional boxing titles
New title	East & Central African super-middleweight champion 19 December 1998 – July 2007; Vacated	Vacant Title next held by Douglas Otieno Okola
New title	EBA light-heavyweight champion 12 November 2004 – April 2005; Vacated	Vacant Title next held by Aleksy Kuziemski
Vacant Title last held by Rudy Markussen	WBO Inter-Continental super-middleweight champion 15 April 2005 – 16 May 2006	Succeeded by Lucian Bute
Vacant Title last held by Jackson Chanet	European Union super-middleweight champion 3 November 2006 – 2008; Vacated	Vacant Title next held by Himself
Vacant Title last held by Himself	European Union super-middleweight champion 14 March 2008 – 2009; Vacated	Vacant Title next held by Himself
Vacant Title last held by Himself	European Union super-middleweight champion 30 January 2010 – 2011; Vacated	Vacant Title next held by Mouhamed Ali Ndiaye
Minor world boxing titles
Vacant Title last held by Anthony Bonsante	IBA super middleweight champion 18 May 2019 – present	Incumbent
