= Roberto Cocco =

Italian boxer and kickboxing (born 1977)

- Born: May 16, 1977 (age 49); Turin, Italy
- Other names: The Hammer
- Nationality: (Italy) Italian
- Height: 1.81 m (5 ft 11 in)
- Weight: 78 kg (172 lb; 12.3 st)
- Division: Middleweight; Super Middleweight; Light Heavyweight
- Style: Boxing, kickboxing
- Team: Dojo Miura, X1 Boxing Torino

Professional boxing record
- Total: 37
- Wins: 20
- By knockout: 8
- Losses: 16
- By knockout: 6
- Draws: 1

Kickboxing record
- Total: 119
- Wins: 86
- By knockout: 42
- Losses: 30
- Draws: 3

Other information
- Boxing record from BoxRec
- Last updated on: July 31, 2018

Roberto Cocco (born May 16, 1977) is an Italian super middleweight Muay Thai kickboxer and boxer, fighting out of Dojo Miura in his home town of Turin, Italy. He is a former three time I.S.K.A. kickboxing world champion and one time World Kickboxing Network (W.K.N.) Thai-boxing world champion.

== Life and career ==
Cocco started learning martial arts aged six in his home town of Turin. He began with Judo but would soon progress to kickboxing despite initial attempts by his parents to discourage him. Through his teen years he attended several competitions in full contact kickboxing and boxing winning the Italian title at amateur level. In 1995 he started to learn Thai-boxing under coach Marco Franza and would turn pro not long after. In 2001, after picking up a number of victories on the domestic scene or across the border in France, Cocco had his first shot at a major title. He faced Carlos Heredia for the I.S.K.A. world title, winning a decision victory after twelve rounds – something Cocco was not used to, having usually faced opponents over three to five rounds.

As a new world champion, doors opened for Cocco and he found himself in position for more honours; defeating Stephan Mbida to claim the W.P.K.C. intercontinental belt, and then going across to São Paulo, Brazil to unify the I.S.K.A. and U.W.K.F. world titles. Throughout 2003, Cocco would defend his I.S.K.A. belt for the second time and win the W.K.N. world title by defeating Carlos Heredia once again, this time only taking one round as opposed to twelve, in a TKO victory.

In 2003 he signed with the recently created SuperLeague, defeating Foad Sadeghi by knockout in his organizational debut in Vienna. By joining the promotion Cocco would face a much stiffer rate of competition, with many of his rivals European and world champions with plenty of fight experience. He found this out to his cost when he faced Joerie Mes in his next SuperLeague match, losing by KO in the fourth round. Between 2003 and 2006 (when the promoted ceased to exist), Cocco had a losing record with SuperLeague, good wins against Foad Sadeghi and Moises Baptista De Sousa tempered by a number of defeats, finishing with a 2 and 7 record with the promotion. He had some success on other circuits, however, defeating Roberto Castro in 2005 to claim the W.A.K.O. Pro world title.

As SuperLeague folded, Cocco started focusing more on professional boxing defeating former kickboxing rival Alexander Dredhaj on his debut in 2006. He would have a number of boxing bouts in his native Italy, culminating in a fight for the vacant W.B.C. Mediterranean title, losing a decision to Nikola Sjekloca. So far, unable to replicate his success on the kickboxing circuit he would be unsuccessful in his two other boxing title fights to date, losing three fights for the Italian title in 2008 and 2010 (two times). Returning to kickboxing action in Europe, in between boxing, Cocco managed to pick up some good wins, defeating Thomas Hladky and multiple Muaythai world champion Rayen Simson to claim the Kings of Kickboxing Munich title in 2007, but dropping decisions to Yohan Lidon, Jiří Žák and Dmitry Shakuta.

He lost to Yury Bessmertny by TKO due to a cut at Thai Boxe Mania in Turin, Italy on November 24, 2012. Even though the cut was caused by an accidental headbutt, Bessmertny was given the win rather than the bout being made a no contest.

He lost a unanimous decision to Karapet Karapetyan at Glory 7: Milan in Milan, Italy on April 20, 2013.

He became W.K.N. Super Middleweight Oriental Rules Intercontinental Kickboxing Champion, facing Yoann Kongolo at Thai Boxe Mania in Turin, Italy on January 25, 2014, winning by judges' split decision.

== Titles ==
Kickboxing:

- 2013 W.K.N. Oriental Rules Super Middleweight Intercontinental Title -79.4 kg
- 2007 "Kings of Kickboxing" Munich preliminary tournament title -75 kg
- 2005 Kombat League Venezia K-1 rules tournament champion -76 kg
- 2005 W.A.K.O. Pro Full-Contact middleweight world champion -75 kg
- 2003 W.K.N. Thai-boxing super welterweight world champion -72.6 kg
- 2003 I.S.K.A. Full-Contact middleweight world champion -75 kg (2nd title defence)
- 2002 U.W.K.F. Full-Contact middleweight world title -75 kg
- 2002 I.S.K.A. Full-Contact middleweight world champion -75 kg (1st title defence)
- 2002 W.P.K.C. Thai-boxing intercontinental champion -76 kg
- 2001 I.S.K.A. Full-Contact middleweight world champion -75 kg

Boxing:

- 2013 F.P.I. Italian Super Middleweight Title in Santa Margherita Ligure, Italy
- 2012 F.P.I. Italian Super Middleweight Title in Turin, Italy
- 2008 F.P.I. Super Middleweight ProCup in Adria, Italy

== Kickboxing record ==
Kickboxing record
86 wins (42 (T)KOs), 30 losses, 3 draws
Date	Result	Opponent	Event	Location	Method	Round	Time
2014-01-25	Win	(Switzerland) Yoann Kongolo	Thai Boxe Mania	Turin, Italy	Decision (split)	5	2:00
Wins W.K.N. Super Middleweight Oriental Rules Intercontinental Kickboxing Title.
2013-04-20	Loss	(Armenia) Karapet Karapetyan	Glory 7: Milan	Milan, Italy	Decision (unanimous)	3	3:00
2012-02-05	Loss	(Belarus) Yury Bessmertny	Thai Boxe Mania	Turin, Italy	TKO (cut)		
2012-02-05	Loss	(Ukraine) Artur Kyshenko	Thai Boxe Mania	Turin, Italy	Decision (unanimous)	3	3:00
2011-11-06	Loss	(Russia) Artem Levin	Muay Thai Premier League: Round 3	The Hague, Netherlands	TKO		
2011-10-08	Loss	(Thailand) Kaoklai Kaennorsing	Muaythai Premier League: Round 2	Padua, Italy	Decision (unanimous)	5	3:00
2011-03-18	Win	(Romania) Marius Tiţă	SUPERKOMBAT The Pilot Show	Râmnicu Vâlcea, Romania	Decision (unanimous)	3	3:00
2011-02-26	Win	(Romania) Aurel Pirtea	X1 Boxing Promotion	Turin, Italy	Decision	3	3:00
2010-11-13	Win	(Croatia) Mario Agatic	X1 Boxing Promotion	Ivrea, Italy	Decision	3	3:00
2010-10-30	Win	(France) Barish Tunal	X1 Boxing Promotion	Turin, Italy	KO	1	
2008-04-12	Loss	(Belarus) Dmitry Shakuta	K-1 Italy Oktagon 2008	Milan, Italy	Decision (unanimous)	3	3:00
2007-06-23	Loss	(Czech Republic) Jiří Žák	5 Knockout Fight Night, Final	Lucerne, Switzerland	Decision	3	3:00
Fight was for "Kings of Kickboxing 2007" Lucerne tournament title -75kg.
2007-06-23	Win	(Syria) Baker Barakat	5 Knockout Fight Night, Semi Final	Lucerne, Switzerland	Decision	3	3:00
2007-05-26	Loss	(France) Yohan Lidon	Abano Grand Prix 2007	Abano Terme, Italy	Decision	3	3:00
2007-03-10	Win	(Suriname) Rayen Simson	Steko's Fight Night 23, Final	Munich, Germany	Decision (unanimous)	3	3:00
Wins "Kings of Kickboxing 2007" Munich preliminary tournament title -75kg.
2007-03-10	Win	(Switzerland) Thomas Hladky	Steko's Fight Night 23, Semi Final	Munich, Germany	Decision	3	3:00
2006-12-09	Loss	(Morocco) Najim Ettouhali	Judgement Day	Roosendaal, Netherlands	Decision	5	3:00
2006-07-02	Loss	(Russia) Ibrahim Tamazaev	King of the Kings 2	Milan, Italy	Decision	5	3:00
2006-03-11	Loss	(France) Dany Bill	SuperLeague Apocalypse 2006	Paris, France	Decision (unanimous)	3	3:00
2006-01-28	Loss	(Belarus) Dmitry Shakuta	SuperLeague Hungary 2006	Budapest, Hungary	Decision (unanimous)	3	3:00
2005-10-22	Loss	(Canada) Clifton Brown	SuperLeague Heavy Knockout 2005	Vienna, Austria	Decision	3	3:00
2005-05-27	Win	(Italy) Rosario Presti	Kombat League Venezia, Final	Mestre, Italy	Decision	3	3:00
Wins Kombat League Venezia K-1 rules tournament -76kg.
2005-05-27	Win	(Italy) Salvatore Abate	Kombat League Venezia, Semi Final	Mestre, Italy	KO	1	
2005-05-27	Win	(Senegal) Guaye Dauda	Kombat League Venezia, Quarter Finals	Mestre, Italy	Decision	3	3:00
2005-05-21	Win	(Brazil) Moises Baptista De Sousa	SuperLeague Germany 2005	Oberhausen, Germany	KO (high kick)	4	
2005-04-05	Win	(United States) Ryan Roy	Lumpinee Stadium	Bangkok, Thailand	KO	2	
2005-03-19	Win	(Netherlands) Ricardo Verschuren		Turin, Italy	KO	1	
2005-02-19	Win	(Brazil) Roberto Castro	The King of Kings	Milan, Italy	TKO (ref. stop./2 knockdowns)	2	
Wins W.A.K.O. Pro Full-Contact middleweight world title -75 kg.
2004-12-11	Loss	(Spain) Cesar Cordoba	Superliga 2004 Federacion Catalana	Barcelona, Spain	Decision	5	3:00
2004-04-24	Win	(Japan) Shingo Eguchi	K-1 Italy 2004	Milan, Italy	Decision	5	3:00
2004-03-30	Loss	(Czech Republic) Jiří Žák	SuperLeague Italy 2004	Padua, Italy	Decision	5	3:00
2003-12-06	Win	(Belgium) Yassine Perricot		Collegno, Italy	Decision		
2003-09-27	Loss	(Netherlands) Joerie Mes	SuperLeague Germany 2003	Wuppertal, Germany	KO	4	
2003-05-10	Win	(Austria) Foad Sadeghi	SuperLeague Austria 2003	Vienna, Austria	KO (knee)	4	
2003-04-12	Win	(Spain) Carlos Heredia		Turin, Italy	TKO	1	
Wins W.K.N. Thai-boxing super welterweight world title -72.6 kg.
2003-03-29	Win	(Romania) Viorel Bondoc		Rome, Italy	TKO	3	
Retains I.S.K.A. Full-Contact middleweight world title -75 kg (2nd defence).
2002-11-30	Win	(Japan) Takaaki Nakamura	Kickboxing Mondiale 3	Padua, Italy	Decision	5	3:00
2002-06-19	Win	(Brazil) Isaul Torrão Soares		São Paulo, Brazil	KO	5	
Wins Soares U.W.K.F. Full-Contact middleweight world title -75 kg & retains I.S.K.A. Full-Contact middleweight world title -75 kg (1st defence).
2002-06-19	Win	(Switzerland) Stephan Mbida		Peschiera Borromeo, Italy	Decision	5	3:00
Wins W.P.K.C. Thai-boxing intercontinental title -76 kg.
2002-05-15	Win	(Italy) Michele Verginelli	Oktagon Milano	Milan, Italy	KO	5	
2002-04-15	Win	(Croatia) Chucovich		Collegno, Italy	Decision		
2002-04-01	Win	(Hungary) Kugler	Oktagon Roma	Rome, Italy	KO	1	
2001-10-13	Win	(Italy) Paolo Reverberi		Bologna, Italy	KO	2	
2001-10-13	Win	(Italy) Cico Zerbini		Borgaro Torinese, Italy	Decision		
2001-07-14	Win	(France) Cloudran		Casale Monferrato, Italy	Decision		
2001-06-12	Win	(Spain) Carlos Heredia		Turin, Italy	Decision	12	2:00
Wins I.S.K.A. Full-Contact middleweight world title -75 kg.
2001-04-14	Win	(England) John Yale		Turin, Italy	KO	1	
2001-03-20	Win	(France) Clarence		Montauban, France	Decision		
2001-03-10	Loss	(France) Bernard Mersch		Saint-Étienne, France	Decision		
2001-02-24	Win	(Italy) Giovanni Perlunger		Trieste, Italy	Decision		
2001-02-10	Draw	(Albania) Alexander Dredhaj		Collegno, Italy	Decision draw		
Legend: Win Loss Draw/no contest Notes

== Boxing record ==
16 wins (6 knockouts, 10 decisions), 12 losses (5 knockouts, 7 decisions), 1 draw
Res.	Record	Opponent	Type	Rd., time	Date	Location	Notes
Win	19-23-3	(Georgia (country)) Giorgi Kandelaki	PTS	6	2017-05-20	Bocciodromo Trombetta, Turin, Italy	
Win	12-13-1	(Serbia) Goran Milenković	KO	4 (6)	2017-02-11	Bocciodromo Trombetta, Turin, Italy	
Win	4-11-0	(Serbia) Bojan Radović	UD	6	2016-11-12	Bocciodromo Trombetta, Turin, Italy	
Loss	13-0-2	(France) Mickael Diallo	TKO	4 (6)	2016-07-30	La Palestre, Le Cannet, France	
Loss	9-1-0	(Italy) Valerio Ranaldi	UD	12	2016-04-16	Palavinium, Pomezia, Italy	For the Italian Super Middleweight Title.
Win	18-81-4	(Romania) Mugurel Sebe	TKO	3 (6)	2015-11-21	Bocciodromo Trombetta, Turin, Italy	
Loss	7-1-0	(Italy) Roberto Bassi	UD	12	2015-05-22	San Benedetto del Tronto, Italy	For the Italian Super Middleweight Title.
Loss	16-2-0	(Italy) Andrea Di Luisa	TKO	11 (12), 0:01	2014-12-20	Fabrica di Roma, Italy	For the Vacant EBU European Union Super Middleweight Title.
Win	4-2-1	(Morocco) Yassine Habachi	TKO	3 (6)	2014-09-13	Grugliasco, Italy	
Loss	10-2-0	(Spain) Mariano Hilario	UD	12	2014-05-31	Teguise, Spain	For the EBU European Union Super Middleweight Title.
Win	5-1-0	(Croatia) Ivan Stupalo	UD	6	2014-03-07	Giaveno, Italy	
Win	14-12-1	(Italy) Fabrizio Leone	PTS	10	2013-12-01	Trieste, Italy	Retains the Italian Super Middleweight Title.
Win	14-1-1	(Italy) Alessio Furlan	SD	10	2013-10-04	Santa Margherita Ligure, Italy	Wins the Vacant Italian Super Middleweight Title.
Loss	14-1-1	(Italy) Massimiliano Buccheri	UD	10	2013-06-14	Rome, Italy	Lost the Italian Super Middleweight Title.
Win	18-11-4	(Italy) Luciano Lombardi	UD	10	2013-03-08	Monza, Italy	Retains the Italian Super Middleweight Title.
Win	7-1-1	(Italy) Matteo Rossi	UD	10	2012-12-28	Turin, Italy	Wins the Vacant Italian Super Middleweight Title.
Loss	6-0-0	(Germany) Robert Woge	TKO	7 (8), 2:07	2012-02-25	Porsche Arena, Stuttgart, Germany	
Loss	18-0-0	(Germany) Dustin Dirks	TKO	6 (8), 1:29	2011-04-02	Gerry Weber Stadion, Halle, Germany	
Loss	11-0-1	(Germany) Henry Weber	UD	8	2010-10-09	Wandsbek, Hamburg, Germany	
Loss	8-0-1	(Italy) Danilo D'Agata	UD	10	2010-07-30	Enna, Italy	For the Vacant Italian Light Heavyweight Title.
Draw	8-1-0	(Italy) Massimiliano Buccheri	PTS	6	2010-06-25	Ponte Milvio, Rome, Italy	
Loss	7-0-0	(Italy) Andrea Di Luisa	KO	1 (10), 0:41	2010-04-09	Viterbo, Italy	For the Vacant Italian Super Middleweight Title.
Loss	9-0-0	(Germany) Artur Hein	UD	8	2009-10-17	Berlin, Germany	
Win	8-51-3	(Czech Republic) Attila Kiss	PTS	6	2009-05-09	Rome, Italy	
Loss	50-2-10	(Denmark) Mads Larsen	TKO	7 (10), 1:49	2008-12-20	Hallenstadion, Zurich, Switzerland	
Loss	13-1-0	(Senegal) Mouhamed Ali Ndiaye	UD	10	2008-10-10	Pontedera, Italy	For the Vacant Italian Super Middleweight Title.
Win	8-1-0	(Albania) Vigan Mustafa	SD	10	2008-07-25	Pre-Saint Didier, Aosta, Italy	
Loss	9-0-0	(Montenegro) Nikola Sjekloća	PTS	12	2008-05-03	Budva, Montenegro	For the WBC Mediterranean Super Middleweight Title.
Win	5-2-0	(Italy) Alex Celotto	PTS	6	2008-02-23	Adria, Italy	Wins the Italian Super Middleweight Pro Cup.
Win	6-1-1	(Italy) Cristiano Cannas	TKO	3 (6), 0:48	2007-11-30	Pezzaze, Italy	
Win	2-5-0	(Serbia) Zoran Plavsić	PTS	6	2007-09-14	Ariano nel Polesine, Italy	
Win	0-0-0	(Montenegro) Jovan Rakonjać	TKO	2 (6)	2007-07-19	Pre-Saint Didier, Aosta, Italy	Jovan Rakonjać debut.
Win	1-3-0	(Italy) Stefano Votano	TKO	5 (6)	2007-06-16	Biella, Italy	
Win	5-2-0	(Hungary) Jeno Markhot	TKO	2 (6)	2007-03-31	La Cassa Turin, Italy	
Win	1-3-2	(Hungary) Béla Kiss	TKO	4 (6)	2006-11-08	Turin, Italy	
Win	1-0-0	(Albania) Alexander Dredhaj	SD	6	2006-10-21	Palasport, Casale Monferrato, Italy	Boxing debut.

== See also ==
- List of male kickboxers
