= Christopher Rebrassé =

French boxer

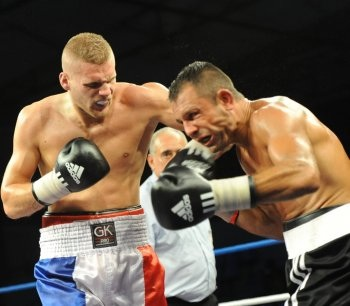
- Rebrassé (left) vs. Moreno, 2010

Personal information
- Nickname: L'iceberg ("The Iceberg")
- Nationality: French
- Born: 2 October 1985 (age 40) Levallois-Perret, Hauts-de-Seine, France
- Height: 1.85 m (6 ft 1 in)
- Weight: Super-middleweight

Boxing career
- Reach: 188 cm (74 in)
- Stance: Orthodox

Boxing record
- Total fights: 34
- Wins: 25
- Win by KO: 6
- Losses: 6
- Draws: 3

Christopher Rebrassé (born 2 October 1985) is a French professional boxer who held the European super-middleweight title in 2014.

== Professional career ==
Rebrassé made his professional debut on 25 November 2006 against Arnold Gond, who also debuted. Their fight ended in a four-round points draw. In his third fight, on 23 March 2007, Rebrassé lost a six-round points decision to Jean Marc Ismael. Rebrassé went undefeated for his next fifteen fights until 12 March 2011, when he lost a ten-round unanimous decision (UD) to Rachid Jkitou. This was followed by a six-round majority draw against Parfait Tindani on 15 April.

On 23 November 2012, Rebrassé won his first major regional championship—the vacant European Union super-middleweight title—by defeating Andrea Di Luisa via seventh-round corner stoppage. In his next fight, on 8 June 2013, Rebrassé challenged for the vacant European super-middleweight title, but his fight against Mouhamed Ali Ndiaye ended in a controversial split draw. In their EBU-mandated rematch on 22 March 2014, Rebrassé won the aforementioned title by stopping Ndiaye in four rounds.

In his first defence of the title, on 20 September 2014, Rebrassé lost a UD to George Groves in the latter's native UK. The vacant WBC Silver super-middleweight title was also on the line. Rebrassé travelled to the UK again on 26 June 2015, this time to face undefeated prospect Callum Smith for another chance to win the vacant WBC Silver super-middleweight title. Smith won a wide UD.

== Professional boxing record ==
34 fights	25 wins	6 losses
By knockout	6	0
By decision	19	6
Draws	3	

No.	Result	Record	Opponent	Type	Round, time	Date	Location	Notes
34	Loss	25–6–3	Hadillah Mohoumadi	UD	12	11 Nov 2017	Vélodrome de Saint-Quentin-en-Yvelines, Montigny-le-Bretonneux, France	For European super-middleweight title
33	Win	25–5–3	Carlos Esteban	UD	8	17 Dec 2016	Gymnase du Clos de l'Arche, Noisy-le-Grand, France	
32	Loss	24–5–3	Rocky Fielding	SD	12	2 Apr 2016	Echo Arena, Liverpool, England	For WBC International super-middleweight title
31	Win	24–4–3	Matiouze Royer	UD	6	13 Feb 2016	Salle Emy-les-Prés, Cormeilles-en-Parisis, France	
30	Loss	23–4–3	Callum Smith	UD	12	26 Jun 2015	Echo Arena, Liverpool, England	For vacant WBC Silver super-middleweight title
29	Win	23–3–3	Istvan Orsos	UD	6	5 Dec 2014	Centre Sportif de Differdange, Oberkorn, Luxembourg	
28	Loss	22–3–3	George Groves	UD	12	20 Sep 2014	The SSE Arena Wembley, London, England	Lost European super-middleweight title; For vacant WBC Silver super-middleweight title
27	Win	22–2–3	Mouhamed Ali Ndiaye	TKO	4 (12)	22 Mar 2014	Palazzetto dello Sport, Pontedera, Italy	Won vacant European super-middleweight title
26	Win	21–2–3	Giorgi Kandelaki	UD	6	6 Dec 2013	Centre Omnisports Pierre de Coubertin, Massy, France	
25	Draw	20–2–3	Mouhamed Ali Ndiaye	SD	12	8 Jun 2013	PalaPentassuglia, Brindisi, Italy	For vacant European super-middleweight title
24	Win	20–2–2	Andrea Di Luisa	RTD	7 (12), 3:00	23 Nov 2012	Pala Malè, Viterbo, Italy	Won vacant European Union super-middleweight title
23	Win	19–2–2	Artem Shcheglov	PTS	6	4 May 2012	Palais des sports Marcel-Cerdan, Levallois-Perret, France	
22	Win	18–2–2	Hassene Azouz Neffati	TKO	8 (10)	5 Apr 2012	Casino Barrière d'Enghien, Paris, France	Retained France super-middleweight title
21	Win	17–2–2	Hugo Kasperski	UD	10	2 Dec 2011	Sports Hall, Clermont-Ferrand, France	Won vacant France super-middleweight title
20	Draw	16–2–2	Parfait Tindani	MD	6	15 Apr 2011	Salle Pierre Montesquiou, Condom, France	
19	Loss	16–2–1	Rachid Jkitou	UD	10	12 Mar 2011	Palais des Sports Maurice Thorez, Paris, France	Lost France super-middleweight title
18	Win	16–1–1	Abdelkahim Derghal	UD	10	19 Dec 2010	Complexe Sportif, Denain, France	Retained France super-middleweight title
17	Win	15–1–1	Pierre Moreno	RTD	9 (10)	3 Jul 2010	Salle du Mouzon, Auch, France	Won vacant France super-middleweight title
16	Win	14–1–1	Anthony Prunier	PTS	6	29 Jan 2010	Palais des sports Marcel-Cerdan, Levallois-Perret, France	
15	Win	13–1–1	Yoann Bloyer	PTS	6	17 Dec 2009	Halle Georges Carpentier, Paris, France	
14	Win	12–1–1	Yoann Camonin	TKO	2 (6)	26 Nov 2009	Gymnase Jean Roure, Les Pennes-Mirabeau, France	
13	Win	11–1–1	Anthony Prunier	PTS	8	9 Jun 2009	Parc des Sports, Pont-Audemer, France	
12	Win	10–1–1	Abdelkahim Derghal	PTS	8	28 Mar 2009	Complexe Sportif, Denain, France	
11	Win	9–1–1	Gabriel Lecrosnier	PTS	6	28 Feb 2009	Palais des Sports, Saint-Denis, France	
10	Win	8–1–1	Mounir Sahli	PTS	8	6 Dec 2008	Cannes La Bocca, Cannes, France	
9	Win	7–1–1	Tony Averlant	PTS	6	20 Nov 2008	Palais des Sports, Saint-Quentin, France	
8	Win	6–1–1	Philippe Mendy	PTS	6	14 Jun 2008	Stade Stéphane Diagana, Eaubonne, France	
7	Win	5–1–1	Arnold Gond	PTS	6	15 Mar 2008	Palais des Sports, Saint-Denis, France	
6	Win	4–1–1	Alexis Montaigne	PTS	6	9 Feb 2008	Complexe Sportif des Iris, Lormont, France	
5	Win	3–1–1	Philippe Mendy	PTS	6	30 Oct 2007	Centre Omnisports Pierre de Coubertin, Massy, France	
4	Win	2–1–1	George Balan	TKO	5 (6)	9 Jun 2007	Palais des Sports, Saint-Denis, France	
3	Loss	1–1–1	Jean Marc Ismael	PTS	6	23 Mar 2007	Salle Pierre Montesquiou, Condom, France	
2	Win	1–0–1	Hacene Limam	PTS	4	3 Mar 2007	Palais des Sports, Saint-Denis, France	
1	Draw	0–0–1	Arnold Gond	PTS	4	25 Nov 2006	Domont, France	

Sporting positions
Regional boxing titles
Vacant Title last held by Mehdi Bouadla	France super-middleweight champion 3 July 2010 – 12 March 2011	Succeeded by Rachid Jkitou
Vacant Title last held by Pierre Moreno	France super-middleweight champion 2 December 2011 – November 2012; Vacated	Vacant Title next held by Hadillah Mohoumadi
Vacant Title last held by Mouhamed Ali Ndiaye	European Union super-middleweight champion 23 November 2012 – 8 June 2013; Vacated	Vacant Title next held by Mariano Hilario
Vacant Title last held by James DeGale	European super-middleweight champion 22 March 2014 – 20 September 2014	Succeeded by George Groves
