= Morrade Hakkar =

French boxer (born 1972)

Morrade Hakkar (born 19 January 1972 in Besançon, France) is a French former professional boxer who competed from 1992 to 2012. He held the French national middleweight title twice (March 1997 to January 1998 and again from March 1999 to October 2000), the WBC International middleweight title (1997) and the European middleweight title 2002.

After knocking out previously undefeated Cristian Sanavia to capture the European middleweight belt on 11 May 2002, he became the mandatory challenger for undisputed world champion Bernard Hopkins. On 29 March 2003 they faced one another in Philadelphia, with Hopkins winning by technical knockout in the eighth round.
