= Messe Erfurt =

Indoor arena in Erfurt, Germany

Coordinates: 50°57′35″N 10°59′25″E

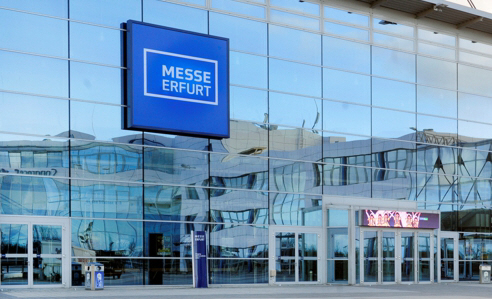
- Interactive map of Messe Erfurt

The Messe Erfurt is a convention center including an indoor arena, in Erfurt, Germany. Its seating capacity is roughly 12,000 people. The convention center has been Green Globe certified since 2014.

The arena has hosted concerts by many famous artists, spanning many different genres.

It serves as home arena for the Rockets (basketball club).

In 2023, the National and International Dog Show took place at the Messe Erfurt.
