= General Alvear Department =

General Alvear Department may refer to

- General Alvear Department, Corrientes, Argentina
- General Alvear Department, Mendoza, Argentina
- General Alvear Partido, Buenos Aires (though in the Buenos Aires Province departments are called partidos

== See also ==
- General Alvear (disambiguation)
