= Alvear =

Alvear may refer to:

== People ==
- Alvear (surname)

== Other ==
- General Alvear (disambiguation)
- Alvear, Corrientes
- Alvear, Santa Fe
- Avenida Alvear
