= General Alvear =

General Alvear is a name that makes reference to the general Carlos María de Alvear. It can also refer to:

- General Alvear, Buenos Aires
- General Alvear, Mendoza
- General Alvear Partido, Buenos Aires
- General Alvear Department, Corrientes
- General Alvear Department, Mendoza
