= Alvear (surname) =

Alvear is a Spanish surname. Notable people with the surname include:

- Cecilia Alvear (1939–2017), Ecuadorian-born American television journalist
- Janina Rizzo Alvear (born 1972), Ecuadorian politician
- Soledad Alvear (born 1950), Chilean lawyer and politician
- Yuri Alvear (born 1986), Colombian judoka

== See also ==
- de Alvear
