= Juan Carlos Reveco =

Argentine boxer (born 1983)

Personal information
- Nickname: Cotón
- Born: Juan Carlos Reveco; 21 August 1983 (age 43) Malargüe, Argentina
- Height: 5 ft 2 in (157 cm)
- Weight: Light flyweight; Flyweight; Super flyweight

Boxing career
- Reach: 63 1/2 in (161 cm)
- Stance: Orthodox

Boxing record
- Total fights: 46
- Wins: 41
- Win by KO: 20
- Losses: 5

Juan Carlos Reveco (born 21 August 1983) is an Argentine professional boxer who has held the WBA light flyweight title and the WBA (Regular) light flyweight and flyweight titles.

== Professional career ==
Reveco turned professional in 2004. In June 2007, he knocked out undefeated Nethra Sasiprapa to capture the vacant WBA Light Flyweight Title, but lost the title in his first defense to Brahim Asloum on 8 December 2007.

He won the Vacant WBA Interim Light Flyweight Title on 18 December 2009, against Ronald Barrera, and was later promoted to full champion. In February 2011, he vacated his light flyweight title in order to be ranked in the flyweight division.

=== Reveco vs. Ioka ===
On 31 December 2015, Reveco fought Kazuto Ioka for the WBA flyweight title. Ioka won the fight in the eleventh round via technical knockout.

=== Reveco vs. Nantapech ===
On 8 September 2017, Reveco fought Komgrich Nantapech. Nantapech was ranked #4 by the IBF and #15 by the WBC at flyweight. Reveco won the fight convincingly via unanimous decision, 120–108, 118-110 and 117–111 on the scorecards.

=== Reveco vs. Nietes ===
In his next bout, Reveco fought Donnie Nietes for the IBF flyweight title. Nietes won the fight via a seventh-round technical knockout.

== Professional boxing record ==
46 fights	41 wins	5 losses
By knockout	20	3
By decision	21	2

No.	Result	Record	Opponent	Type	Round, time	Date	Location	Notes
46	Loss	41–5	Miguel Angel Canido	TKO	3 (8), 1:40	26 August 2022	Polideportivo Vicente Polimeni, Las Heras, Argentina	
45	Win	41–4	Hector Rolando Gusman	TKO	5 (6), 2:30	6 May 2022	Sportivo Pedal Club, San Rafael, Argentina	
44	Win	40–4	Jeremias Javier Ulibarre	UD	6	10 April 2021	Club Atlético Talleres, Villa Gobernador Galvez, Argentina	
43	Loss	39–4	Donnie Nietes	TKO	7 (12), 0:53	24 February 2018	The Forum, Inglewood, California, U.S.	For IBF flyweight title
42	Win	39–3	Komgrich Nantapech	UD	12	9 September 2017	Estadio Deportistas Alvearenses, General Alvear, Argentina	
41	Win	38–3	Jesus Vargas	UD	12	21 April 2017	Estadio F.A.B., Buenos Aires, Distrito Federal, Argentina	
40	Win	37–3	Diego Luis Pichardo Liriano	UD	10	2 December 2016	Polideportivo Municipal Malal Hue, Malargüe, Argentina	Won vacant IBF Latino flyweight title
39	Loss	36–3	Kazuto Ioka	TKO	11 (12), 1:57	31 December 2015	Osaka Prefectural Gymnasium, Osaka, Japan	For WBA (Regular) flyweight title
38	Win	36–2	Breilor Teran	UD	10	26 September 2015	Salón del Sindicato de Químicos y Petroquímicos, Bahía Blanca, Argentina	
37	Loss	35–2	Kazuto Ioka	MD	12	22 April 2015	Osaka Prefectural Gymnasium, Osaka, Japan	Lost WBA (Regular) flyweight title
36	Win	35–1	Yodmongkol Vor Saengthep	KO	5 (12), 1:40	19 December 2014	Polideportivo Gustavo Toro Rodriguez, San Martín, Argentina	Retained WBA (Regular) flyweight title
35	Win	34–1	Felix Alvarado	UD	12	6 June 2014	Villa La Ñata Sporting Club, Benavídez, Argentina	Retained WBA (Regular) flyweight title
34	Win	33–1	Manuel Vides	KO	2 (12), 2:40	21 March 2014	Villa La Ñata Sporting Club, Benavídez, Argentina	Retained WBA (Regular) flyweight title
33	Win	32–1	Ricardo Núñez	TD	8 (12)	12 October 2013	Polideportivo Gustavo Toro Rodriguez, San Martín, Argentina	Retained WBA (Regular) flyweight title
32	Win	31–1	Ulises Lara	TKO	8 (12), 2:52	22 June 2013	Estadio Deportistas Alvearenses, General Alvear, Argentina	Retained WBA (Regular) flyweight title
31	Win	30–1	Masayuki Kuroda	UD	12	27 February 2013	Todoroki Arena, Kawasaki, Japan	Retained WBA (Regular) flyweight title
30	Win	29–1	Julián Rivera	UD	12	10 November 2012	Polideportivo Municipal, Malargüe, Argentina	Retained WBA interim flyweight title
29	Win	28–1	Karim Guerfi	UD	12	11 May 2012	Orfeo Superdomo, Córdoba, Argentina	Retained WBA interim flyweight title
28	Win	27–1	Jean Piero Pérez	KO	2 (12), 2:47	10 June 2011	Polideportivo Vicente Polimeni, Las Heras, Argentina	Won WBA interim flyweight title
27	Win	26–1	Miguel Ángel Téllez	UD	10	21 January 2011	Polideportivo Vicente Polimeni, Las Heras, Argentina	
26	Win	25–1	Armando Torres	TKO	5 (12), 2:28	7 July 2010	Polideportivo Vicente Polimeni, Las Heras, Argentina	Retained WBA interim light flyweight title
25	Win	24–1	Luis Doria	TKO	6 (10), 0:58	19 June 2010	Polideportivo Vicente Polimeni, Las Heras, Argentina	Retained WBA interim light flyweight title
24	Win	23–1	Emerson Santos Carvalho	KO	5 (8), 1:57	13 February 2010	Hotel Conrad Punta del Este Resort & Casino, Maldonado, Uruguay	Retained WBA interim light flyweight title
23	Win	22–1	Ronald Barrera	KO	3 (12), 2:56	18 December 2009	Polideportivo La Colonia, Junín, Argentina	Retained WBA interim light flyweight title
22	Win	21–1	Francisco Rosas	SD	12	15 August 2009	Palacio Municipal, Cozumel, Mexico	Won WBA interim light flyweight title
21	Win	20–1	Wilson Simao	TKO	4 (11)	14 March 2009	Club Atletico San Martín, San Martín, Argentina	Retained WBA Fedelatin light flyweight title
20	Win	19–1	Javier Tello	KO	6 (10), 2:20	17 October 2008	Polideportivo Municipal, Malargüe, Argentina	Won vacant WBA Fedelatin light flyweight title
19	Win	18–1	Ricardo Ariel Toledo	KO	4 (10), 0:58	13 June 2008	Polideportivo Municipal, Malargüe, Argentina	
18	Loss	17–1	Brahim Asloum	UD	12	8 December 2007	La Palestre, Le Cannet, France	Lost WBA light flyweight title
17	Win	17–0	Humberto Pool	KO	5 (12), 0:57	13 October 2007	Luna Park, Buenos Aires, Argentina	Retained WBA light flyweight title
16	Win	16–0	Nethra Sasiprapa	KO	8 (12), 2:38	22 June 2007	Polideportivo Vicente Polimeni, Las Heras, Argentina	Won vacant WBA light flyweight title
15	Win	15–0	Adrián Dimas Garzón	KO	7 (10), 1:39	24 February 2007	Auditorio Angel Bustelo, Mendoza, Argentina	Retained WBA Fedelatin light flyweight title
14	Win	14–0	Ricardo Ariel Toledo	UD	8	22 December 2006	Auditorio Angel Bustelo, Mendoza, Argentina	
13	Win	13–0	Juan Francisco Centeno	KO	6 (10), 0:59	26 August 2006	Polideportivo Municipal, Malargüe, Argentina	Retained WBA Fedelatin light flyweight title
12	Win	12–0	Freddy Beleno	SD	10	12 May 2006	Orfeo Superdomo, Córdoba, Argentina	Won WBA Fedelatin light flyweight title
11	Win	11–0	Bernardo Ramon Albornoz	RTD	5 (6), 0:01	28 January 2006	Polideportivo Municipal, Tunuyán, Argentina	
10	Win	10–0	Carlos Gustavo Palacios	UD	6	1 November 2005	Ce.De.M. N° 1, Caseros, Argentina	
9	Win	9–0	Gustavo Adrian Rodriguez	UD	6	17 September 2005	Polidep. Municipal Malal Hue, Malargüe, Argentina	
8	Win	8–0	Bernardo Ramon Albornoz	UD	4	8 July 2005	Estadio Polideportivo, Tunuyán, Argentina	
7	Win	7–0	Bernardo Ramon Albornoz	UD	4	20 May 2005	Estadio Polideportivo Nº 2, San Rafael, Argentina	
6	Win	6–0	Fernando Jesus Decaillet	KO	1 (4), 0:58	11 March 2005	General Alvear, Argentina	
5	Win	5–0	Leonel Guillermo Eric Pereira	UD	4	17 December 2004	Malargüe, Argentina	
4	Win	4–0	Leonel Guillermo Eric Pereira	UD	4	13 November 2004	Estadio Posta del Retamo, Junín, Argentina	
3	Win	3–0	Nicolas Dario Diaz	KO	1 (4), 1:30	9 October 2004	Club Atletico Villa Mitre, Bahía Blanca, Argentina	
2	Win	2–0	Jesus Alfredo Mendoza	UD	4	29 May 2004	Estadio Pascual Perez, Mendoza, Argentina	
1	Win	1–0	Ernesto Daniel Maldonado	TKO	3 (4)	23 April 2004	Estadio Pascual Perez, Mendoza, Argentina	

== See also ==
- List of world light-flyweight boxing champions
- List of world flyweight boxing champions

Sporting positions
World boxing titles
Vacant Title last held by Kōki Kameda	WBA light flyweight champion 22 June 2007 - 8 December 2007	Succeeded by Brahim Asloum
Vacant Title last held by Giovani Segura	WBA light flyweight champion Interim Title; 15 August 2009 - 28 August 2010; Promoted	Vacant Title next held by Román González
Preceded by Giovani Segura; Promoted to Super Champion	WBA light flyweight champion 28 August 2010 - 4 February 2011; Vacated; Regular Title until 26 November 2010	Succeeded by Román González; Interim Champion promoted
Preceded by Jean Piero Pérez	WBA flyweight champion Interim Title; 10 June 2011 - 31 August 2011; Status changed	Vacant Title next held by Himself
Vacant Title last held by Himself	WBA flyweight champion Interim Title; 22 September 2011 - 17 November 2012; Promoted	Vacant Title next held by Kompayak Porpramook
Preceded by Hernán Márquez; Lost bid for Super title	WBA flyweight champion Regular Title; 17 November 2012 - 22 April 2015	Succeeded by Kazuto Ioka
Honorary boxing titles
Vacant	WBA flyweight champion Interim Champion in Recess; 31 August 2011 - 22 September 2011	Status changed
