= Koki Eto =

Japanese boxer (born 1988)

Koki Eto 江藤光喜
Personal information
- Born: February 8, 1988 (age 38) Kunigami, Okinawa, Japan
- Height: 5 ft 8 1/2 in (174 cm)
- Weight: Flyweight; Super flyweight

Boxing career
- Reach: 69 1/2 in (177 cm)
- Stance: Orthodox

Boxing record
- Total fights: 31
- Wins: 24
- Win by KO: 19
- Losses: 5
- Draws: 1
- No contests: 1

Koki Eto (江藤 光喜, Etō Kōki; born February 8, 1988) is a Japanese former professional boxer who competed from 2008 to 2019. He held the WBA interim flyweight title in 2013 and challenged for the WBC super-flyweight title in 2015.

Koki is the oldest of the three Eto brothers. His twin brother Taiki and their younger brother Shingo are all professional boxers.

== Professional career ==
Eto won the interim WBA flyweight title from Thai Kompayak Porpramook via a twelve-round unanimous decision in the latter's first title defence in Bangkok on August 1, 2013. "I can't believe it... I did it!' he exclaimed wearing the championship belt, "A dream can come true if you won't give it up!"

He would then lose the title to Yodmongkol Vor Saengthep on November 29, 2013, in his first title defense in Chonburi via twelfth-round knockout. He had suffered a fracture of the orbital floor in the first round of this fight.

On June 17, 2014, he scored a come-from-behind eighth-round knockout over Ardin Diale to seize the vacant OPBF flyweight title at the Korakuen Hall.

== Professional boxing record ==
31 fights	20 wins	9 losses
By knockout	19	5
By decision	1	4
Draws	1	
No contests	1	

No.	Result	Record	Opponent	Type	Round, time	Date	Location	Notes
31	Loss	24–5–1 (1)	Jeyvier Cintrón	UD	10 (10)	2019-08-02	Osceola Heritage Center, Kissimmee, Florida, U.S.	For vacant WBO International super-flyweight title
30	NC	24–4–1 (1)	Jeyvier Cintrón	NC	1 (10)	2019-05-25	Osceola Heritage Center, Kissimmee, Florida, U.S.	For vacant WBO International super-flyweight title
29	Win	24–4–1	Romel Oliveros	TKO	4 (8)	2019-02-02	Korakuen Hall, Tokyo, Japan	
28	Win	23–4–1	Delfin de Asis	KO	6 (10)	2018-08-16	Korakuen Hall, Tokyo, Japan	
27	Win	22–4–1	Marzon Cabilla	TKO	3 (8)	2018-03-03	Korakuen Hall, Tokyo, Japan	
26	Win	21–4–1	Khenchanthuek Sithsaithong	TKO	3 (8)	2017-09-13	Korakuen Hall, Tokyo, Japan	
25	Win	20–4–1	Sittichai Bensalaeh	TKO	2 (8)	2017-03-28	Korakuen Hall, Tokyo, Japan	
24	Win	19–4–1	Jun Blazo	KO	8 (8)	2016-11-05	Korakuen Hall, Tokyo, Japan	
23	Win	18–4–1	Michael Escobia	UD	8 (8)	2016-05-12	Korakuen Hall, Tokyo, Japan	
22	Loss	17–4–1	Carlos Cuadras	UD	12 (12)	2015-11-28	Xebio Arena, Sendai, Japan	For WBC super-flyweight title
21	Win	17–3–1	Yuki Fukumoto	TKO	8 (12)	2015-06-08	Korakuen Hall, Tokyo, Japan	Retained OPBF flyweight title
20	Win	16–3–1	Cris Paulino	KO	10 (12)	2014-11-26	Korakuen Hall, Tokyo, Japan	Retained OPBF flyweight title
19	Win	15–3–1	Ardin Diale	KO	8 (12)	2014-06-17	Korakuen Hall, Tokyo, Japan	Won vacant OPBF flyweight title
18	Loss	14–3–1	Sirichai Thaiyen	TKO	12 (12)	2013-11-29	City Hall Ground, Chonburi, Thailand	Lost WBA interim flyweight title
17	Win	14–2–1	Suriyan Satorn	UD	12 (12)	2013-08-01	11th Infantry Regiment, Bangkok, Thailand	Won WBA interim flyweight title
16	Win	13–2–1	Surakrai Tiankaew	KO	2 (8)	2013-04-10	Korakuen Hall, Tokyo, Japan	
15	Win	12–2–1	Denchailek Kratingdaenggym	KO	2 (8)	2012-11-12	Korakuen Hall, Tokyo, Japan	
14	Draw	11–2–1	Yota Hori	PTS	6 (6)	2011-12-21	Korakuen Hall, Tokyo, Japan	
13	Loss	11–2	Boonsom Lamsiri	UD	12 (12)	2011-08-04	Central Stadium, Phitsanulok, Thailand	For WBC International Silver flyweight title
12	Win	11–1	Pattana Tadniyom	TKO	2 (10)	2011-06-06	Korakuen Hall, Tokyo, Japan	
11	Win	10–1	Suriya Insee	UD	8 (8)	2011-03-07	Korakuen Hall, Tokyo, Japan	
10	Win	9–1	Omar Parrales	KO	1 (6)	2011-01-22	Arena Neza, Ciudad Nezahualcoyotl, Mexico	
9	Win	8–1	Nirun Baonok	TKO	1 (8)	2010-09-13	Korakuen Hall, Tokyo, Japan	
8	Win	7–1	Wichangkhao Por Thitima	TKO	1 (6)	2010-05-18	Korakuen Hall, Tokyo, Japan	
7	Win	6–1	Naoki Shiosawa	TKO	5 (6)	2010-03-17	Korakuen Hall, Tokyo, Japan	
6	Win	5–1	Shota Hashimoto	TKO	3 (6)	2009-12-02	Korakuen Hall, Tokyo, Japan	
5	Win	4–1	Tatsuya Ishii	TKO	2 (4)	2009-10-12	Korakuen Hall, Tokyo, Japan	
4	Loss	3–1	Naoki Shiosawa	MD	4 (4)	2009-07-21	Korakuen Hall, Tokyo, Japan	
3	Win	3–0	Kenichi Watanabe	UD	4 (4)	2009-04-13	Korakuen Hall, Tokyo, Japan	
2	Win	2–0	Masato Oshiro	MD	4 (4)	2008-11-30	Okinawa Convention Center, Ginowan, Japan	
1	Win	1–0	Katsuhiko Muranaka	KO	1 (4)	2008-08-11	Korakuen Hall, Tokyo, Japan	

== See also ==
- Boxing in Japan

Sporting positions
Regional boxing titles
Vacant Title last held by Rocky Fuentes	OPBF flyweight champion June 17, 2014 – 2015; Vacated	Vacant Title next held by Ardin Diale
World boxing titles
Preceded by Kompayak Porpramook	WBA flyweight champion Interim title August 1, 2013 – November 29, 2013	Succeeded by Yodmongkol Vor Saengthep
