= Ryoji Fukunaga =

Japanese boxer (born 1986)

Ryoji Fukunaga 福永亮次
Personal information
- Nickname: Little Pacquiao
- Nationality: Japanese
- Born: 30 August 1986 (age 40) Takatsuki, Japan
- Height: 5 ft 7 in (170 cm)
- Weight: Super-flyweight

Boxing career
- Reach: 66.5 in (169 cm)
- Stance: Southpaw

Boxing record
- Total fights: 20
- Wins: 15
- Win by KO: 14
- Losses: 5

Ryoji Fukunaga (Japanese: 福永亮次, Fukunaga Ryoji; born 30 August 1986) is a retired Japanese professional boxer. He was a one-time WBO super-flyweight title challenger and the former OPBF and WBO Asia-Pacific super–flyweight champion.

== Professional boxing career ==
=== Early career ===
==== 2015 Rookie of the Year tournament ====
Fukunaga worked as a carpenter after graduating from junior high school and took up boxing at the age of 25. He made his professional debut against Seita Mochizuki on 10 August 2013, at the Azalea Taisho in Osaka, Japan. Fukunaga lost the fight by majority decision, with scores of 37–39, 38-39 and 38-38. Fukunaga fought twice during the next two years, against Retsu Hosokawa on 15 December 2013 and Seita Shimamiya on 28 January 2018, winning both fights by knockout. After amassing a 2–1 record, Fukunaga was booked to face Yamato Kikuchi in the opening round of the 2015 East Japan "Rookie of the Year" super-flyweight tournament. He won the fight by a first-round knockout. Advancing to the quarterfinals, which were held on 15 July 2015, Fukunaga faced Daichi Yamamoto. He won the fight by a second-round knockout. Fukunaga faced Ryo Matsubara in the tournament semifinals on 25 September 2015. Matsubara stopped Fukunaga's tournament run, as he won the fight by a first-round technical knockout.

==== 2016 Rookie of the Year tournament ====
Fukunaga returned to action seven months later, to participate in the 2016 "Rookie of the Year" super-flyweight tournament. Fukunaga was able to skip the opening round this time around and was immediately booked to face Takuya Numasawa in the tournament quarterfinals. He won the fight by a first-round technical knockout. Fukunaga faced Rikiya Ono in the tournament semifinals on 4 October 2016, and won the fight by a fourth-round technical knockout. Fukunaga faced Yukito Tomori in the tournament finals, held on 13 November 2016. He was able to win the tournament this time around, as he stopped Tomori by a third-round knockout. This victory earned Fukunaga the right to face Kota Fujimoto on 23 December 2016, for the All-Japan Rookie of the Year super-flyweight title. He won the fight by a fifth-round technical knockout.

Fukunaga faced Yoshinobu Kakinaga on 1 April 2017, in the first eight-round bout of his career. He won the fight by a seventh-round technical knockout. Fukunaga won his next eight round bout as well, as stopped Patiphon Upanan in the second round on 13 September 2017. Fukunaga was booked to face Yuta Matsuo on 26 April 2018. Matsuo won the fight by split decision, with scores of 79–73, 77-75 and 77–76. Despite this loss, Fukunaga was scheduled to challenge Jakrawut Majungoen for the OPBF Silver super-flyweight title on 29 June 2018.

=== Regional titlist ===
==== Fukunaga vs. Saludar ====
Fukunaga was scheduled to challenge the reigning WBO Asia Pacific champion Froilan Saludar on 14 February 2020, at the Korakuen Hall in Tokyo, Japan, in the first twelve-round bout of his career. As Saludar was the more experienced fighter, who had faced a greater level of opposition in his career up to that point, Saludar came into the fight as a favorite. Despite this, Fukunaga won the fight by a seventh-round technical knockout. He first knocked Saludar down with a body strike, before forcing the referee to wave the fight off with a flurry of punches.

==== Fukunaga vs. Nakagawa ====
Fukunaga was booked to make his first title defense against the reigning Japanese super-flyweight champion Kenta Nakagawa on 14 December 2020, at the Korakuen Hall in Tokyo, Japan. Both of the titles, as well as the vacant OPBF super-flyweight title were on the line. Fukunaga was seen as the slight favorite, with Fukunaga's power being seen as the great advantage. Although both fighters were on equal terms during the first half of the bout, Nakagawa began to fatigue as the fight went on. Referee Yuji Fukuchi finally stopped the fight at the 2:24 minute mark of the tenth round, as the obviously gassed Nakagawa was unable to intelligently defend himself from the advancing Fukugawa.

==== Fukunaga vs. Fujii ====
Fukunaga was scheduled to make the second defense of his WBO Asia Pacific title and the first defense of his newly acquired Japanese title against fellow southpaw Takahiro Fujii on 21 June 2021, at the Korakuen Hall in Tokyo, Japan. Fujii was seen as a surprising and somewhat undeserving title challenger, and as such Fukunaga entered the fight as a favorite. Fukunaga beat the #8 ranked Japanese super-flyweight by an eight-round technical knockout. He badly knocked Fujii down at the 1:19 minute mark of the eight rounds, which left him unable to raise from the canvas. This victory earned him the "Fighting Spirit" award for the month of June by the East Japan Boxing Association.

==== Fukunaga vs. Kaji ====
Fukunaga made the first defense of all three titles (the OPBF, Japanese and WBO Asia Pacific) against the undefeated Hayate Kaji on 2 October 2021, at the Korakuen Hall in Tokyo, Japan. Kaji was seen as the best opponent he had faced up to that point in his career, but Fukunaga nevertheless entered the fight as the favorite. Fukunaga expected to earn a title shot should he beat Kaji, stating: "If I beat Mr. Kaji, I think I can say I am qualified for taking a crack at a world title". Fukunaga won the tightly contested bout by majority decision, in front of an audience of 580, with two judges awarding him a 115-113 scorecard, while the third judge scored it as an even 114–114 draw. The controversial fight result would later be awarded the "Robbery of the Year" by Asian Boxing.

On 17 November 2021, Fukunaga vacated the OPBF super-flyweight title.

==== Fukunaga vs. Ioka ====
On 27 December 2021, it was announced that Fukunaga would challenge the reigning WBO super-flyweight champion Kazuto Ioka on 31 December 2021, at the Ota City General Gymnasium in Tokyo, Japan. Ioka was originally expected to make his fourth title defense in a title unification bout with the IBF champion Jerwin Ancajas, but the fight was eventually called off due to stricter COVID-19 measures imposed by the Japanese government. On 28 December 2021, Fukunaga vacated the Japanese, OPBF and the WBO Asia Pacific super-flyweight titles. Ioka won the fight by unanimous decision, with scores of 115–113, 116–112 and 118–110. Fukunaga had a strong start to the fight, but Ioka began to take over from the midpoint of the fight onward.

On 10 August 2022, Fukunaga announced his retirement from the sport. The day he submitted his retirement notification to the Japan Boxing Commission was the day he made his professional debut nine years previously.

== Professional boxing record ==
20 fights	15 wins	5 losses
By knockout	14	1
By decision	1	4

No.	Result	Record	Opponent	Type	Round, time	Date	Location	Notes
20	Loss	15–5	Kazuto Ioka	UD	12	31 Dec 2021	Ota-City General Gymnasium, Tokyo, Japan	For WBO super-flyweight title
19	Win	15–4	Hayate Kaji	MD	12	2 Oct 2021	Korakuen Hall, Tokyo, Japan	Retained WBO Asia Pacific, OPBF and Japanese super-flyweight titles
18	Win	14–4	Takahiro Fujii	TKO	8 (12), 1:19	21 Jun 2021	Korakuen Hall, Tokyo, Japan	Retained WBO Asia Pacific and Japanese super-flyweight titles
17	Win	13–4	Kenta Nakagawa	TKO	10 (12), 2:24	14 Dec 2020	Korakuen Hall, Tokyo, Japan	Retained WBO Asia Pacific super-flyweight title Won Japanese and vacant OPBF super-flyweight titles
16	Win	12–4	Froilan Saludar	TKO	7 (12), 1:40	14 Feb 2020	Korakuen Hall, Tokyo, Japan	Won WBO Asia Pacific super-flyweight title
15	Win	11–4	Kittipong Jareonroy	TKO	1 (6), 2:13	8 May 2019	Korakuen Hall, Tokyo, Japan	
14	Loss	10–4	Jakrawut Majungoen	UD	10	29 Jun 2018	Ayutthaya Park, Ayutthaya, Thailand	For OPBF Silver super-flyweight title
13	Loss	10–3	Yuta Matsuo	SD	8	26 Apr 2018	Korakuen Hall, Tokyo, Japan	
12	Win	10–2	Patiphon Upanan	TKO	2 (8), 1:36	13 Sep 2017	Korakuen Hall, Tokyo, Japan	
11	Win	9–2	Yoshinobu Kakinaga	TKO	7 (8), 1:10	1 Apr 2017	Korakuen Hall, Tokyo, Japan	
10	Win	8–2	Kota Fujimoto	TKO	5 (5), 1:52	23 Dec 2016	Korakuen Hall, Tokyo, Japan	Won All Japan Rookie of the Year super-flyweight title
9	Win	7–2	Yukito Tomori	KO	3 (5), 2:34	13 Nov 2016	Korakuen Hall, Tokyo, Japan	Won East Japan Rookie of the Year super-flyweight title
8	Win	6–2	Rikiya Ono	TKO	4 (4), 1:03	4 Oct 2016	Korakuen Hall, Tokyo, Japan	
7	Win	5–2	Takuya Numasawa	TKO	1 (4), 1:17	29 Jul 2016	Korakuen Hall, Tokyo, Japan	
6	Loss	4–2	Ryo Matsubara	TKO	1 (4), 2:06	25 Sep 2015	Korakuen Hall, Tokyo, Japan	
5	Win	4–1	Daichi Yamamoto	KO	2 (4), 1:02	15 Jul 2015	Korakuen Hall, Tokyo, Japan	
4	Win	3–1	Yamato Kikuchi	KO	1 (4), 2:19	7 May 2015	Korakuen Hall, Tokyo, Japan	
3	Win	2–1	Seita Shimamiya	KO	2 (4), 2:52	28 Jan 2015	Korakuen Hall, Tokyo, Japan	
2	Win	1–1	Retsu Hosokawa	KO	1 (4), 2:46	15 Dec 2013	Incubation Center, Amagasaki, Japan	
1	Loss	0–1	Seita Mochizuki	MD	4	10 Aug 2013	Azalea Taisho, Osaka, Japan	
