= Jean Piero Pérez =

Venezuelan boxer (born 1981)

Personal information
- Born: Jean Piero Pérez; 7 March 1981 (age 45) Venezuela
- Weight: Flyweight

Boxing career

Boxing record
- Total fights: 31
- Wins: 21
- Win by KO: 14
- Losses: 9
- Draws: 1
- No contests: 0
Medal record
Central American and Caribbean Games
| Gold medal – first place | 2002 San Salvador | Flyweight |
South American Games
| Bronze medal – third place | 2002 Belém | Flyweight |

Jean Piero Pérez (born 7 March 1981) is a Venezuelan professional boxer who held the Interim WBA Flyweight title from January 2011 to June 2011.

== Professional career ==
Pérez made his professional debut on April 24, 2004, defeating Panama's Eloy Carpintero in the Gimnasio Escolar in David, Chiriquí, Panama.

On January 29, 2011, Pérez won a twelve-round unanimous decision over Jesús Jiménez of Mexico to capture the interim WBA flyweight title. The bout was held at the Arena Coliseo, Guadalajara, Mexico.

He who won the gold medal as an amateur at the 2002 Central American and Caribbean Games in San Salvador. In the final he defeated Puerto Rico's Carlos Valcárcel.

== Professional boxing record ==
| 31 fights | 21 wins | 9 losses |
|---|---|---|
| By knockout | 14 | 5 |
| By decision | 7 | 4 |
| Draws | 1 | |

| No. | Result | Record | Opponent | Type | Round, time | Date | Location | Notes |
|---|---|---|---|---|---|---|---|---|
| 31 | Loss | 21–9–1 | Edgar Valencia | UD | 8 | 26 Feb 2017 | Centro de Convenciones Vasco Núñez de Balboa (Hotel El Panama), Panama City, Panama | |
| 30 | Win | 21–8–1 | Jonathan Arias | UD | 6 | 28 Oct 2016 | Gimnasio Municipal, 24 de Diciembre, Panama | |
| 29 | Loss | 20–8–1 | Kazuto Ioka | KO | 5 (10), 2:09 | 31 Dec 2014 | Bodymaker Colosseum, Osaka, Japan | |
| 28 | Loss | 20–7–1 | David Sánchez | KO | 1 (10), 2:52 | 2 Nov 2013 | Centro de Usos Multiples, Hermosillo, Mexico | |
| 27 | Loss | 20–6–1 | Kompayak Porpramook | TKO | 6 (12), 1:48 | 26 Apr 2013 | Khon Kaen, Thailand | For vacant interim WBA flyweight title |
| 26 | Win | 20–5–1 | Eddy Zuniga | UD | 6 | 15 Mar 2013 | Gimnasio Fight Club, San José, Costa Rica | |
| 25 | Loss | 19–5–1 | Milan Melindo | MD | 12 | 22 Sep 2012 | Cebu City Waterfront Hotel & Casino, Barangay Lahug, Cebu City, Philippines | For WBO International flyweight title |
| 24 | Win | 19–4–1 | Michael Arango | KO | 8 (8), 2:14 | 26 Apr 2012 | Arena Roberto Durán, Panama City, Panama | |
| 23 | Loss | 18–4–1 | Juan Carlos Reveco | KO | 2 (12), 2:47 | 10 Jun 2011 | Polideportivo Vicente Polimeni, Las Heras, Argentina | Lost interim WBA flyweight title |
| 22 | Win | 18–3–1 | Jesús Jiménez | UD | 12 | 29 Jan 2011 | Arena Coliseo, Guadalajara, Mexico | Won vacant interim WBA flyweight title |
| 21 | Win | 17–3–1 | Franklin Solis | TKO | 2 (8), 3:00 | 30 Nov 2010 | Centro de Convenciones Atlapa, Panama City, Panama | |
| 20 | Win | 16–3–1 | Freddy Beleno | TKO | 4 (8), 1:33 | 14 Aug 2010 | Arena Roberto Durán, Panama City, Panana | |
| 19 | Win | 15–3–1 | Jorge Ballesteros | KO | 2 (8), 1:52 | 4 Jun 2010 | Arena Roberto Durán, Panama City, Panama | |
| 18 | Win | 14–3–1 | Abraham Irias | KO | 3 (8), 0:54 | 24 Mar 2009 | Centro de Convenciones Atlapa, Panama City, Panama | |
| 17 | Draw | 13–3–1 | Francisco Rosas | SD | 12 | 22 Nov 2008 | Plaza de Toros Monumental, Monterrey, Mexico | WBA flyweight title eliminator |
| 16 | Win | 13–3 | Jhon Alberto Molina | UD | 10 | 19 Aug 2008 | Centro de Convenciones Atlapa, Panama City, Panama | |
| 15 | Loss | 12–3 | Rafael Concepción | TKO | 3 (10), 0:48 | 27 Mar 2008 | Centro de Convenciones Atlapa, Panama City, Panama | |
| 14 | Win | 12–2 | Adolfo Ramos | KO | 8 (10), 2:15 | 1 Dec 2007 | Arena roberto Durán, Panama City, Panama | |
| 13 | Win | 11–2 | Leonel Arburola | KO | 1 (8), 2:09 | 29 Sep 2007 | Jardin Los Mellos, Alanje, Panama | |
| 12 | Loss | 10–2 | Rafael Concepción | SD | 10 | 24 Mar 2007 | Figali Convention Center, Fort Amador, Panama | For vacant WBA Fedelatin flyweight title |
| 11 | Win | 10–1 | Ronald Ramos | UD | 10 | 10 Jun 2006 | Centro de Convenciones Atlapa, Panama City, Panama | Won vacant WBA Fedelatin light flyweight title |
| 10 | Win | 9–1 | Carlos Murillo | KO | 3 (10), 2:14 | 25 Nov 2005 | Centro de Convenciones Atlapa, Panama City, Panama | Won inaugural WBA Fedecaribe flyweight title |
| 9 | Win | 8–1 | Donaldo Mullett | KO | 3 (8), 1:47 | 8 Sep 2005 | Centro de Convenciones Atlapa, Panama City, Panama | |
| 8 | Win | 7–1 | Jonathan Aguilar | UD | 6 | 1 Jul 2005 | Arena Roberto Durán, Panama City, Panama | |
| 7 | Loss | 6–1 | Ricardo Molina | MD | 6 | 16 Apr 2005 | Arena Roberto Durán, Panama City, Panama | |
| 6 | Win | 6–0 | Yenrry Bermudez | TKO | 4 (4) | 13 Dec 2004 | Centro Recreacional Yesterday, Turmero, Venezuela | |
| 5 | Win | 5–0 | Ezequiel Asprilla | MD | 4 | 1 Oct 2004 | Figali Convention Center, Fort Amador, Panama | |
| 4 | Win | 4–0 | Luis Perez | TKO | 4 (4), 2:59 | 14 Aug 2004 | Gimnasio Escolar, David, Panama | |
| 3 | Win | 3–0 | Luis Quiel | KO | 2 (4), 1:49 | 3 Jul 2004 | Gimnasio Escolar, David, Panama | |
| 2 | Win | 2–0 | Carlos Frias | TKO | 1 (4) | 18 Jun 2004 | Jardín Nuevas Glorias Soberanas, Juan Díaz, Panama | |
| 1 | Win | 1–0 | Eloy Carpintero | TKO | 1 (4), 2:07 | 24 Apr 2004 | Gimnasio Escolar, David, Panama | |

Achievements
| Vacant Title last held by Luis Concepción | WBA Flyweight Champion; Interim Title; January 29, 2011 – June 10, 2011 | Succeeded by Juan Carlos Reveco |
