= Kazuto Ioka =

Japanese boxer (born 1989)

Kazuto Ioka 井岡一翔
Personal information
- Born: 24 March 1989 (age 37) Sakai, Osaka, Japan
- Height: 5 ft 4 1/2 in (164 cm)
- Weight: Mini flyweight; Light flyweight; Flyweight; Super flyweight; Bantamweight

Boxing career
- Reach: 64 1/2 in (164 cm)
- Stance: Orthodox

Boxing record
- Total fights: 37
- Wins: 32
- Win by KO: 17
- Losses: 5
- Draws: 1

Kazuto Ioka (井岡 一翔, Ioka Kazuto; born 24 March 1989) is a Japanese professional boxer who held the unified WBA and WBC mini-flyweight titles between 2011 and 2012, the WBA (Regular) light-flyweight title from 2012 to 2014, the WBA flyweight title from 2016 to 2017, having previously held the WBA (Regular) flyweight title from 2015 to 2016, and the WBO super-flyweight title from 2019 to 2023, and the WBA super-flyweight title from 2023 to 2024.

== Amateur career ==
Kazuto Ioka is the nephew of flyweight champion Hiroki Ioka. Kazuto asked his father to teach him how to box as a teenager. His father, Kazunori Ioka, would continue training him through his amateur and professional career. Ioka amassed a record of 95–10 as an amateur, winning six national high school tournaments along the way. He reached the semifinals of the 2008 King's Cup, an amateur boxing tournament held in Thailand, before losing to Amnat Ruenroeng. Ioka joined Tokyo Agricultural University, hoping to represent his country in the 2008 Olympics but he would fall short on the qualifiers.

=== Highlights ===
- 16th All Japan Selected High School Boxing Championships, Light flyweight Tournament winner (2005)
- 17th All Japan Selected High School Boxing Championships, Light flyweight Tournament winner (2006)
- 59th Inter-highschool championships, Boxing, Light flyweight Tournament winner
- 60th Inter-highschool championships, Boxing, Light flyweight Tournament winner
- 60th National Sports Festival, Boxing, Boys, Light flyweight Tournament winner
- 61st National Sports Festival, Boxing, Boys, Light flyweight Tournament winner
- 62nd National Sports Festival, Boxing, Adult, Light flyweight Tournament winner
- 63rd National Sports Festival, Boxing, Adult, Light flyweight Tournament winner

== Professional career ==
=== Early career ===
Upon failing to qualify for the Olympics, Ioka dropped out from college and turned professional in 2009. On April 12, 2009, he fought against Thongthailek Sor Tanapinyo, and won his debut via a third-round technical knockout. After this victory, he won six straight victories. After winning 5 fights, Ioka competed for the vacant Japanese light flyweight title. Ioka captured the national title by stopping Masayoshi Segawa in the final 10th round.

=== Mini-flyweight ===
==== WBC mini-flyweight champion ====
In his next fight, Ioka won the WBC mini-flyweight title from Oleydong Sithsamerchai via a fifth-round technical knockout in the latter's seventh title defence at the World Memorial Hall, in February 2011. Sithsamerchai was knocked down twice over the course of his first professional loss.

Ioka went on to defend his title twice in 2011, first against Juan Hernández, winning via unanimous decision (118–111, 117–111, 116–112), and then against Yodgoen Tor Chalermchai, winning via first-round technical knockout on New Year's Eve 2011.

==== Unified mini-flyweight champion ====
On 20 June 2012, Ioka met WBA champion Akira Yaegashi in a match that marked the first time two Japanese fighters had met to unify world titles. The fight took place at the Osaka Prefectural Gymnasium. Ioka defeated the WBA champion Akira Yaegashi via a unanimous decision (115–113, 115–113, 115–114). The two fighters exchanged hard shots throughout a tense, tactical fight. The fight ended with Yaegashi and Ioka trading combinations while looking for a knockout. From early in the fight, Yaegashi's eye was nearly shut. The ringside doctor performed several checks on it but Yaegashi was allowed to finish the fight. When asked whether the result would have been different unless he got swollen eyes, Yaegashi said "We should not think about it. There is no if's in boxing". The day after the fight, Ioka decided to move up a weight division.

=== Light-flyweight ===
==== WBA (Regular) light-flyweight champion ====
Shortly after the fight, Ioka moved up to light flyweight as well. On December 31, 2012, Ioka beat undefeated José Alfredo Rodríguez for the vacant WBA (Regular) light-flyweight title at the Osaka Prefectural Gymnasium. Ioka knocked Rodríguez down once in round 1 and twice in round 6 before the referee stopped the fight. Ioka held the Regular version of the WBA's title, while Román Gonzalez was the WBA (Super) champion. Ioka went on to defend his title three times but he never faced González.

=== Flyweight ===
On February 28, 2014, Ioka would vacate the WBA (Regular) light flyweight title to move up to the flyweight division. On May 7, 2014, Ioka faced Thai IBF champion Amnat Ruenroeng at the Osaka Prefectural Gymnasium. Ioka seemed to be the more active boxer but Ruenroeng landed heavier blows while countering Ioka. Ruenroeng lost a point for hitting after the break. Nevertheless, Ruenroeng retained his title with a split decision (119–108, 115–112, 113–114). The 119–108 card turned in by judge Pawel Kardyni was criticized as being far too wide.

==== WBA (Regular) flyweight champion ====
On April 22, 2015, Ioka defeated WBA (Regular) champion Juan Carlos Reveco by majority decision (116–113, 115–113, 114–114). The fight saw Reveco take the early rounds but Ioka came on strong in the middle rounds and got the nod in the end. Reveco appealed the decision to the World Boxing Association, who ordered an immediate rematch. Ioka was later granted a voluntary defense against Roberto Sosa, with the winner ordered to face Reveco. Ioka beat Sosa in a shutout unanimous decision (120–108, 119–109, 119–109). The Ioka-Reveco rematch was set for December 2015. Ioka outworked Reveco at the start of the match. However, Reveco started rallying in round 7. Ioka answered in kind, nearly knocking out Reveco. Reveco finally went down in round 11 following a series of hooks to the body.

Ioka was nearing a deal to fight WBA (Super) flyweight champion Juan Francisco Estrada, when the latter vacated to compete at super flyweight. Ioka was knocked down for the first time in his career against 18 year old challenger and WBA interim champion Stamp Kiatniwat. Ioka rallied, pummeling Kiatniwat to the body, until he finally dropped the challenger twice in round 9. The referee halted the fight with the second knockdown. The win was Ioka's fourth flyweight defense.

In November 2017, Ioka vacated his title after five successful defenses. He was planning to defend on December 31 but his father stated that he would not be ready to do so, as he hadn't kept up with his training after getting married earlier in the year to Nana Tanimura. Ioka went on to announce his retirement at age 28 after getting married and reportedly falling out with his father and promoter, Kazunori Ioka.

=== Super-flyweight ===
On New Year's Eve in 2018, Ioka fought three weight champion Donnie Nietes for the vacant WBO super-flyweight title. Although many thought Ioka had done enough to win the fight, he controversially lost by split decision, with a 116–112 scorecard in his favor being overruled by 116–112 and 118–110 scorecards in favor of Nietes.

==== WBO super-flyweight champion ====
In June 2019, Ioka fought Aston Palicte for the vacant WBO super flyweight title. In the tenth round, after leading on all three judges' scorecards, Ioka scored a TKO victory to become the first Japanese boxer in history to win a major title in four weight classes.

On New Year's Eve in 2019, Ioka fought undefeated Jeyvier Cintrón in his first defense of his WBO title, winning a twelve-round unanimous decision with two judges scoring the bout 116–112 and the third scoring it 115–113.

Ioka made the second defense of his WBO title in an exciting fight against undefeated three weight champion and domestic foe Kosei Tanaka on New Year's Eve 2020 in Tokyo. After a competitive first four rounds in which Tanaka was the aggressor and Ioka found success with counter punches, Ioka dropped his opponent in the fifth round with a counter left hook. With about a minute left in the sixth round, he again knocked Tanaka down. In the eighth round, Ioka caught his opponent with another hard counter left hook, and referee Michiaki Someya caught Tanaka before he could fall and waved off the fight, with Ioka retaining his WBO title via eighth-round technical knockout.

On June 1, 2021, the WBO ordered Ioka to defend his super-flyweight title against their #2 contender in the division, former unified mini-flyweight champion Francisco Rodríguez Jr. The bout between Ioka and Rodríguez took place on September 1, 2021, in Tokyo. Ioka won the fight by unanimous decision, with all three judges awarding scores of 116–112 in his favor.

==== Ioka vs. Ancajas cancellation ====
Ioka was expected to face the IBF super flyweight champion Jerwin Ancajas in a title unification bout on December 31, 2021, at the Ota City General Gymnasium in Tokyo, Japan. The fight was officially postponed on December 3, as stricter COVID-19 measures imposed by the Japanese government prevented Ancajas from entering the country. Ioka was rescheduled to face the WBO Asia Pacific and OPBF super flyweight champion Ryoji Fukunaga instead, on the same date and at the same venue. He won the fight by unanimous decision, with scores of 115–113, 116-112 and 118–110.

==== Ioka vs. Nietes II ====
On April 1, 2022, the WBO ordered Ioka to make a mandatory title defense against Donnie Nietes. The bout will be a rematch of their December 31, 2018, fight, which Nietes won by split decision. The pair came to an agreement a month later, and officially announced the bout for July 13. Ioka won the fight by unanimous decision, with scores of 120–108, 118–110 and 117–111.

=== WBA Super-Flyweight Champion ===
==== Ioka vs. Franco ====
On December 31, 2022, Ioka made his sixth super flyweight title defense in a unification bout with WBA champion Joshua Franco. They fought into a majority draw and retained both their titles. Ioka vacated the WBO title on February 14, in order to face Franco in a rematch after being ordered to make a mandatory title defense against Junto Nakatani. Ioka beat Franco by unanimous decision to capture the WBA title, which was previously vacated as Franco failed to make weight.

==== Ioka vs. Perez ====
A year later, on 31 December 2023, Ioka made the first defense of his WBA super-flyweight title against Venezuelan boxer Josber "Avalancha" Perez. With their bout taking place at Ota City General Gymnasium, Ōta, Tokyo, Japan. Ioka justified his role as the vast betting favorite by knocking out Perez in the 7th round of their scheduled 12-round bout.

==== Ioka vs Martinez ====
Ioka lost by unanimous decision to the IBF super-flyweight champion Fernando Martínez in a title unification bout at the Ryōgoku Kokugikan in Tokyo, Japan, on July 7, 2024.

==== Ioka vs Martinez 2 ====
A rematch between Ioka and Martinez was held at City General Gymnasium in Ōta, Tokyo, Japan, on May 11, 2025. Ioka lost via unanimous decision.

=== Bantamweight ===
==== Ioka vs Ordosgoitti ====
Making his debut at bantamweight, Ioka knocked out Maikel Ordosgoitti in the fourth of their scheduled 10-round contest at City General Gymnasium in Ōta, Tokyo, Japan, on December 31, 2025.

==== Ioka vs Inoue ====
Ioka challenged WBC bantamweight champion Takuma Inoue at the Tokyo Dome on May 2, 2026, losing via unanimous decision in a fight where he was knocked to the canvas twice.

== Personal life ==
Ioka was born in Sakai, Osaka, and currently resides in Tokyo.

In April 2021, reports surfaced that Ioka had failed a drug test and tested positive for marijuana, with the sample having been examined at length as part of an ongoing investigation with the National Police Agency as well as the Japanese Boxing Commission (JBC). Speaking on Ioka's behalf, his lawyer Masanao Hattori said that Ioka “strongly denies he has ever used” any form of cannabis, and suggested it could be attributed to the use of CBD oil. On 19 May 2021, Ioka was cleared of all doping charges, as it emerged that the JBC had mishandled the samples, and they took responsibility for their poor sample management.

== Professional boxing record ==
38 fights	32 wins	5 losses
By knockout	17	0
By decision	15	5
Draws	1	

No.	Result	Record	Opponent	Type	Round, time	Date	Location	Notes
38	Loss	32–5–1	Takuma Inoue	UD	12	2 May, 2026	Tokyo Dome, Tokyo, Japan	For WBC bantamweight title
37	Win	32–4–1	Maikel Ordosgoitti	KO	4 (10), 2:42	Dec 31, 2025	Ota City General Gymnasium, Ōta, Tokyo, Japan	
36	Loss	31–4–1	Fernando Martínez	UD	12	May 11, 2025	Ota City General Gymnasium, Ōta, Tokyo, Japan	For WBA super-flyweight title
35	Loss	31–3–1	Fernando Martínez	UD	12	Jul 7, 2024	Ryōgoku Kokugikan, Tokyo, Japan	Lost WBA super-flyweight title; For IBF super-flyweight title
34	Win	31–2–1	Josber Perez	KO	7 (12), 2:44	Dec 31, 2023	Ota City General Gymnasium, Ōta, Tokyo, Japan	Retained WBA super-flyweight title
33	Win	30–2–1	Joshua Franco	UD	12	Jun 24, 2023	Ota City General Gymnasium, Ōta, Tokyo, Japan	Won vacant WBA super-flyweight title
32	Draw	29–2–1	Joshua Franco	MD	12	Dec 31, 2022	Ota City General Gymnasium, Ōta, Tokyo, Japan	Retained WBO super-flyweight title; For WBA super-flyweight title
31	Win	29–2	Donnie Nietes	UD	12	Jul 13, 2022	Ota City General Gymnasium, Ōta, Tokyo, Japan	Retained WBO super-flyweight title
30	Win	28–2	Ryoji Fukunaga	UD	12	Dec 31, 2021	Ota City General Gymnasium, Ōta, Tokyo, Japan	Retained WBO super-flyweight title
29	Win	27–2	Francisco Rodríguez Jr.	UD	12	Sep 1, 2021	Ota City General Gymnasium, Ōta, Tokyo, Japan	Retained WBO super-flyweight title
28	Win	26–2	Kosei Tanaka	TKO	8 (12), 1:35	Dec 31, 2020	Ota City General Gymnasium, Ōta, Tokyo, Japan	Retained WBO super-flyweight title
27	Win	25–2	Jeyvier Cintrón	UD	12	Dec 31, 2019	Ota City General Gymnasium, Ōta, Tokyo, Japan	Retained WBO super-flyweight title
26	Win	24–2	Aston Palicte	TKO	10 (12), 1:46	Jun 19, 2019	Makuhari Messe, Chiba, Japan	Won vacant WBO super-flyweight title
25	Loss	23–2	Donnie Nietes	SD	12	Dec 31, 2018	Wynn Palace, Macau, SAR	For vacant WBO super-flyweight title
24	Win	23–1	McWilliams Arroyo	UD	10	Sep 8, 2018	The Forum, Inglewood, California, U.S.	Won WBC Silver super-flyweight title
23	Win	22–1	Noknoi CP Freshmart	UD	12	Apr 23, 2017	Edion Arena, Osaka, Japan	Retained WBA flyweight title
22	Win	21–1	Stamp Kiatniwat	TKO	7 (12), 2:51	Dec 31, 2016	Shimazu Arena, Kyoto, Japan	Retained WBA flyweight title
21	Win	20–1	Keyvin Lara	KO	11 (12), 1:11	Jul 20, 2016	Edion Arena, Osaka, Japan	Retained WBA (Regular) flyweight title
20	Win	19–1	Juan Carlos Reveco	TKO	11 (12), 1:57	Dec 31, 2015	Edion Arena, Osaka, Japan	Retained WBA (Regular) flyweight title
19	Win	18–1	Roberto Sosa	UD	12	Sep 27, 2015	Edion Arena, Osaka, Japan	Retained WBA (Regular) flyweight title
18	Win	17–1	Juan Carlos Reveco	MD	12	Apr 22, 2015	Bodymaker Colosseum, Osaka, Japan	Won WBA (Regular) flyweight title
17	Win	16–1	Jean Piero Pérez	KO	5 (10), 2:09	Dec 31, 2014	Bodymaker Colosseum, Osaka, Japan	
16	Win	15–1	Pablo Carrillo	UD	10	Sep 16, 2014	Korakuen Hall, Tokyo, Japan	
15	Loss	14–1	Amnat Ruenroeng	SD	12	May 7, 2014	Bodymaker Colosseum, Osaka, Japan	For IBF flyweight title
14	Win	14–0	Felix Alvarado	UD	12	Dec 31, 2013	Bodymaker Colosseum, Osaka, Japan	Retained WBA (Regular) light-flyweight title
13	Win	13–0	Kwanthai Sithmorseng	KO	7 (12), 2:18	Sep 11, 2013	Bodymaker Colosseum, Osaka, Japan	Retained WBA (Regular) light-flyweight title
12	Win	12–0	Wisanu Kokietgym	KO	9 (12), 2:51	May 8, 2013	Bodymaker Colosseum, Osaka, Japan	Retained WBA (Regular) light-flyweight title
11	Win	11–0	José Alfredo Rodríguez	TKO	6 (12), 2:50	Dec 31, 2012	Bodymaker Colosseum, Osaka, Japan	Won vacant WBA (Regular) light-flyweight title
10	Win	10–0	Akira Yaegashi	UD	12	Jun 20, 2012	Bodymaker Colosseum, Osaka, Japan	Retained WBC mini-flyweight title; Won WBA mini-flyweight title
9	Win	9–0	Yodgoen Tor Chalermchai	TKO	1 (12), 1:38	Dec 31, 2011	Prefectural Gymnasium, Osaka, Japan	Retained WBC mini-flyweight title
8	Win	8–0	Juan Hernández	UD	12	Aug 10, 2011	Korakuen Hall, Tokyo, Japan	Retained WBC mini-flyweight title
7	Win	7–0	Oleydong Sithsamerchai	TKO	5 (12), 1:07	Feb 11, 2011	World Memorial Hall, Kobe, Japan	Won WBC mini-flyweight title
6	Win	6–0	Masayoshi Segawa	TKO	10 (10), 1:57	Oct 10, 2010	Prefectural Gymnasium, Osaka, Japan	Won vacant Japanese light-flyweight title
5	Win	5–0	Albert Alcoy	TKO	9 (10), 1:57	Jul 25, 2010	Prefectural Gymnasium, Osaka, Japan	
4	Win	4–0	Heri Amol	UD	10	Apr 18, 2010	Prefectural Gymnasium, Osaka, Japan	
3	Win	3–0	Takashi Kunishige	UD	10	Dec 29, 2009	Prefectural Gymnasium, Osaka, Japan	
2	Win	2–0	Hiroshi Matsumoto	TKO	2 (8), 2:59	Jul 26, 2009	Prefectural Gymnasium, Osaka, Japan	
1	Win	1–0	Thongthailek Sor Tanapinyo	TKO	3 (6), 0:26	Apr 12, 2009	Prefectural Gymnasium, Osaka, Japan	

== Titles in boxing ==
=== Major world titles ===
- WBA mini-flyweight champion (105 lbs)
- WBC mini-flyweight champion (105 lbs)
- WBA (Regular) light-flyweight champion (Note: Kazuto Ioka was considered the Primary champion from January 14 – February 28, 2014 after Román González vacated the title to move up to flyweight.) (108 lbs)
- WBA (Regular) flyweight champion (Note: Kazuto Ioka was considered the Primary champion from September 14, 2016 – November 9, 2017 after Juan Francisco Estrada vacated the title to move up to super flyweight.) (112 lbs)
- WBA super-flyweight champion (115 lbs)
- WBO super-flyweight champion (115 lbs)

=== Secondary major world titles (Note: The secondary champion lineage lists the Regular or Unified champions while the primary champion is occupied.) ===
- WBA (Regular) light-flyweight champion (Note: Kazuto Ioka was the Secondary champion from December 31, 2012 – January 14, 2014.) (108 lbs)
- WBA (Regular) flyweight champion (Note: Kazuto Ioka was the Secondary champion from April 22, 2015 – September 14, 2016.) (112 lbs)

=== Regional/International titles ===
- Japanese light-flyweight champion (108 lbs)
- WBC Silver super-flyweight champion (115 lbs)

== See also ==
- Boxing in Japan
- List of Japanese boxing world champions
- List of world mini-flyweight boxing champions
- List of world light-flyweight boxing champions
- List of world flyweight boxing champions
- List of world super-flyweight boxing champions
- List of boxing quadruple champions

== Notes and references ==
=== References ===
Sporting positions
Regional boxing titles
Vacant Title last held by Ryo Miyazaki	Japanese light-flyweight champion October 10, 2010 – February 2011; Vacated	Vacant Title next held by Masayuki Kuroda
Preceded by McWilliams Arroyo	WBC silver super-flyweight champion September 8, 2018 – 2019; Vacated	Vacant Title next held by Athenkosi Dumezweni
World boxing titles
Preceded by Oleydong Sithsamerchai	WBC mini-flyweight champion February 11, 2011 – July 1, 2012; Vacated	Vacant Title next held by Xiong Chaozhong
Preceded by Akira Yaegashi	WBA mini-flyweight champion June 20, 2012 – October 2, 2012; Vacated	Vacant Title next held by Ryo Miyazaki
Vacant Title last held by Román González	WBA light-flyweight champion December 31, 2012 – February 28, 2014; Regular title until January 14, 2014; Vacated	Succeeded by Alberto Rossel promoted from interim status
Preceded by Juan Carlos Reveco	WBA flyweight champion April 22, 2015 – November 9, 2017; Regular Title until September 14, 2016; Vacated	Vacant Title next held by Artem Dalakian
Vacant Title last held by Donnie Nietes	WBO super-flyweight champion June 19, 2019 – February 15, 2023; Vacated	Vacant Title next held by Junto Nakatani
Vacant Title last held by Joshua Franco	WBA super-flyweight champion June 24, 2023 – July 7, 2024	Succeeded by Fernando Martínez
