= Artem Dalakian =

Ukrainian boxer

Artem Dalakian Артем Далакян
Personal information
- Nationality: Ukrainian
- Born: 10 August 1987 (age 39) Baku, Azerbaijan SSR, USSR (nowadays Azerbaijan)
- Height: 5 ft 5 1/2 in (166 cm)
- Weight: Flyweight

Boxing career
- Reach: 67 in (170 cm)
- Stance: Orthodox

Boxing record
- Total fights: 23
- Wins: 22
- Win by KO: 15
- Losses: 1

Artem Dalakian (Ukrainian: Артем Далакян; born 10 August 1987) is a Ukrainian professional boxer who held the World Boxing Association (WBA) flyweight title between 2018 and 2024.

== Professional career ==
=== Early career ===
Dalakian was scheduled to fight Angel Moreno for the vacant WBA Continental flyweight title, on July 17, 2015. He won the fight by a unanimous decision.

Dalakian was scheduled to make his first title defense against Robert Kanalas, on December 5, 2015. He beat Kanalas by a first-round technical knockout, stopping his opponent at the 2:24 minute mark.

Dalakian defended his title for the second time against the 2013 EBU Flyweight champion Silviu Olteanu, on May 14, 2016. Dalakian won the fight by an eight-round technical knockout.

Dalakian fought Jozsef Ajtai in his third title defense, on November 6, 2016. He beat Ajtai by a third-round technical knockout.

Dalaian was scheduled to make his fourth and final WBA Continental title defense against Luis Manuel Macias, on April 22, 2017. He beat Macias by a sixth-round knockout.

=== WBA flyweight champion ===
==== Dalakian vs. Viloria ====
Dalakian was scheduled to fight the former unified WBA and WBO flyweight champion Brian Viloria on February 24, 2018, for the vacant WBA flyweight title. The fight was scheduled as a part of the "Superfly 2" card, which was the second of a series of professional boxing cards centered around the super flyweight division. Viloria was the more experienced of the two, having fought in fourteen world title fights, while Dalakian was making his first world title challenge. Dalakian won the fight by a dominant unanimous decision, with all three judges scoring the fight scoring the fight 118-109 for Dalakian. The referee took away a point from Dalakian in the ninth round for repeatedly pushing Viloria down. Dalakian kept distance from Viloria throughout the twelve, managing to stagger his opponent in both the second and ninth rounds, although he was unable to finish him.

==== Dalakian vs. Thaiyen ====
Dalakian was scheduled make his first title defense against Sirichai Thaiyen on June 17, 2018. Thaiyen was, at the time, the #1 rated contender in the WBA flyweight rankings and Dalakian's mandatory challenger. Dalakian was completely dominant, knocking Thaiyen down in rounds five, six and eight, with the referee stopping the fight after the third knockdown.

==== Dalakian vs. Lebron ====
It was announced on October 16, 2018, that Dalakian would make a voluntary defense in December. The rumored opponents included Dennepa Kaitniwat, Gregorio Lebron and an unknown Japanese opponent. Dalakian later revealed he would make his second title defense against Gregorio Lebron on December 15, 2018. Lebron was ranked #3 at flyweight by the WBA. Dalakian won the fight by technical knockout, managing to knock Lebron down three times in the sixth round.

==== Dalakian vs. Thawornkham ====
Dalakian was scheduled to make his third title defense against the #1 ranked WBA flyweight and the WBA mandatory Sarawut Thawornkham, on June 15, 2019. Dalakian was in control from the very beginning of the fight, punishing the advancing Sarawut, who offered little in return. He beat Sarawut by a tenth-round technical knockout.

==== Dalakian vs. Perez ====
Dalakian was scheduled to fight Josber Perez in his fourth title defense, on February 8, 2020. Perez was ranked #12 by the WBA at flyweight. Dalakian won the fight by unanimous decision, with scores of 117–111, 117-111 and 118–110. Perez had sporadic success in the first half of the fight, but Dalakian was able to successfully counter with two or three punch combinations.

==== Dalakian vs. Concepcion ====
Dalakian is scheduled to make the fifth defense of his WBA title against Luis Concepción on November 20, 2021, at the AKKO International in Kyiv, Ukraine. Concepcion was ranked #1 by the WBA at flyweight. Dalakian won the fight by a ninth-round technical knockout, forcing Concepción's corner to throw in the towel 41 seconds into the round.

== Professional boxing record ==
23 fights	22 wins	1 loss
By knockout	15	0
By decision	7	1

No.	Result	Record	Opponent	Type	Round, time	Date	Location	Notes
23	Loss	22–1	Seigo Yuri Akui	UD	12	23 Jan 2024	EDION Arena, Osaka, Japan	Lost WBA flyweight title
22	Win	22–0	David Jiménez	UD	12	28 Jan 2023	OVO Arena Wembley, London, United Kingdom	Retained WBA flyweight title
21	Win	21–0	Luis Concepción	TKO	9 (12), 0:41	20 Nov 2021	AKKO International, Kyiv, Ukraine	Retained WBA flyweight title
20	Win	20–0	Josber Perez	UD	12	8 Feb 2020	Parkovy Convention Centre, Kyiv, Ukraine	Retained WBA flyweight title
19	Win	19–0	Sarawut Thawornkham	TKO	10 (12), 2:08	15 Jun 2019	Parkovy Convention Centre, Kyiv, Ukraine	Retained WBA flyweight title
18	Win	18–0	Gregorio Lebron	TKO	6 (12), 2:46	15 Dec 2018	Parkovy Convention Centre, Kyiv, Ukraine	Retained WBA flyweight title
17	Win	17–0	Sirichai Thaiyen	TKO	8 (12), 2:54	17 Jun 2018	Parkovy Convention Centre, Kyiv, Ukraine	Retained WBA flyweight title
16	Win	16–0	Brian Viloria	UD	12	24 Feb 2018	The Forum, Inglewood, California, U.S.	Won vacant WBA flyweight title
15	Win	15–0	Luis Manuel Macias	KO	6 (12), 2:31	22 Apr 2017	Parkovy Convention Centre, Kyiv, Ukraine	Retained WBA Continental (Europe) flyweight title
14	Win	14–0	Jozsef Ajtai	TKO	3 (12), 2:28	6 Nov 2016	Parkovy Convention Centre, Kyiv, Ukraine	Retained WBA Continental (Europe) flyweight title
13	Win	13–0	Silviu Olteanu	TKO	8 (12), 2:10	14 May 2016	Parkovy Convention Centre, Kyiv, Ukraine	Retained WBA Continental (Europe) flyweight title
12	Win	12–0	Robert Kanalas	TKO	1 (12), 2:24	5 Dec 2015	Stereo Plaza, Kyiv, Ukraine	Retained WBA Continental (Europe) flyweight title
11	Win	11–0	Angel Moreno	UD	12	17 Jul 2015	AKKO International, Kyiv, Ukraine	Won vacant WBA Continental (Europe) flyweight title
10	Win	10–0	Malkhaz Tatrishvili	TKO	2 (8), 1:01	22 Nov 2014	Ice Palace, Brovary, Ukraine	
9	Win	9–0	Kyrylo Kolomoytsev	TKO	8 (8), 1:32	24 Jan 2014	Sport Palace Druzhba, Donetsk, Ukraine	
8	Win	8–0	Juan Purisima	UD	12	24 Aug 2013	Donbass Arena, Donetsk, Ukraine	Retained WBA International flyweight title
7	Win	7–0	David Kanalas	KO	1 (12)	5 Apr 2013	Sergey Bubka school of Olympic reserve, Donetsk, Ukraine	Won vacant WBA International flyweight title
6	Win	6–0	Galin Paunov	TKO	2 (6), 2:37	10 Nov 2012	Sport Palace Druzhba, Donetsk, Ukraine	
5	Win	5–0	Kyrylo Kolomoytsev	UD	6	27 Jul 2012	Sportpalace Dynamo, Donetsk, Ukraine	
4	Win	4–0	Serhiy Chekalov	TKO	4 (6), 2:54	21 Jun 2012	Sportpalace Dynamo, Donetsk, Ukraine	
3	Win	3–0	Levan Garibashvili	TKO	4 (6), 1:44	2 May 2012	Sports Complex SportMax, Donetsk, Ukraine	
2	Win	2–0	Sergey Tasimov	UD	4	10 Jan 2012	Sport Palace Druzhba, Donetsk, Ukraine	
1	Win	1–0	Artur Oganesian	TKO	3 (4), 2:00	26 Aug 2011	Donbass Arena, Donetsk, Ukraine	

== See also ==
- List of world flyweight boxing champions

Sporting positions
World boxing titles
Vacant Title last held by Kazuto Ioka	WBA flyweight champion February 24, 2018 – January 23, 2024	Succeeded by Seigo Yuri Akui
