= Kompayak Porpramook =

Thai boxer

- Born: Suriyan Satorn (สุริยัน สาทร); 18 June 1982 (age 44); Amphoe Lam Plai Mat, Buriram province, northeast Thailand (Isan)
- Native name: คมพยัคฆ์ ป.ประมุข
- Other names: Kompayak CP Freshmart (คมพยัคฆ์ ซีพีเฟรชมาร์ท); Kompayak Banchamek (คมพยัคฆ์ บัญชาเมฆ); Kompayak Shingi Dojo (คมพยัคฆ์ ชินกิโดโจ)
- Nickname: Fierece Tiger
- Nationality: Thai
- Height: 154 cm (5 ft 1/2 in)
- Weight: Light flyweight Flyweight; Super flyweight
- Team: Petchyindee Boxing Promotions; Kokiat Boxing Group; Zendokai Shingi Dojo

Professional boxing record
- Total: 76
- Wins: 61
- By knockout: 41
- Losses: 14
- Draws: 1

Other information
- Boxing record from BoxRec

Kompayak Porpramook (Thai: คมพยัคฆ์ ป.ประมุข) is a Thai professional boxer in the light flyweight and flyweight divisions. He is the former World Boxing Association (WBA) interim flyweight champion and former World Boxing Council (WBC) light flyweight champion. Kompayak Porpramook became the second Thai to capture the WBC light flyweight title, following Saman Sorjaturong in the 1990s.

== Biography & career ==
He was born in Buriram province in the northeastern region of Thailand. When he was only three years old, his family moved to Samut Sakhon province on the western outskirts of Bangkok, where he grew up. His parents had relocated there for work. He began fighting in Muay Thai at the age of 10 for a payment of just 200 baht. In 1997, he traveled to Bangkok for the first time to fight and joined Porpramook Boxing Gym.

Porpramook won the WBC light flyweight title from Adrián Hernández in a thrilling bout held at the 2nd Infantry Regiment, 11th Guard Division, in Bang Khen. He scored a knockout in the 10th round at the end of 2011, shortly after the major floods in Thailand. The match was later named the WBC's Fight of the Year.

He later faced Hernández in a rematch in Toluca, Mexico, but lost the title after a TKO in the sixth round when the referee stopped the fight.

Porpramook returned to the world title scene with a knockout victory over Venezuelan Jean Piero Pérez in the sixth round at Khon Kaen City Hall, claiming the interim WBA flyweight title. However, later in the same year (mid-2013), he lost the belt by decision after 12 rounds to Koki Eto of Japan in a bout held once again at the 2nd Infantry Regiment in Bang Khen. Porpramook was nearly knocked out in the final round, and Eto became the first Japanese fighter in many years to win a world title on Thai soil.

After that, Porpramook changed boxing stables and managers several times, including a stint under Sombat Banchamek (Buakaw Banchamek). He continued to compete while also training others in Muay Thai, boxing, and even karate at Zendokai Shingi Dojo, a Japanese martial arts gym in the Phra Khanong area.

On March 24, 2018, at the age of 35, he returned to the title scene with a split decision win over rising star Pongsaklek Sithdabnij of Surachart Pisitwuttinan's camp at Workpoint Studio in Pathum Thani province. However, in the rematch held on June 23, 2018 at the same venue, he lost by unanimous decision. But in the rematch on June 23, 2018 at the same place, he is defeated by the unanimous scores.

== Professional boxing record ==
76 fights	61 wins	14 losses
By knockout	41	6
By decision	20	8
Draws	1	

No.	Result	Record	Opponent	Type	Round, time	Date	Location	Notes
76	Loss	61–14–1	(Thailand) Nawaphon Kaikanha	TKO	5 (8)	2022-08-27	(Thailand) Suamlum Night Bazaar, Ratchadaphisek, Bangkok	
75	Draw	61–13–1	(Thailand) Peerapol Boonchauy	UD	6 (6)	2022-03-29	(Thailand) City Hall Ground, Nakhon Sawan	
74	Loss	61–13	(Thailand) Thattana Luangphon	UD	10 (10)	2022-02-26	(Thailand) Suamlum Night Bazaar, Ratchadaphisek, Bangkok	
73	Loss	61–12	(Thailand) Tanes Ongjunta	UD	10 (10)	2021-03-27	(Thailand) Suamlum Night Bazaar, Ratchadaphisek, Bangkok	
72	Win	61–11	(Thailand) Nutdanai Chaiyon	UD	6 (6)	2021-02-27	(Thailand) Singmanassak Muaythai School, Pathum Thani	
71	Loss	60–11	(Thailand) Phongsaphon Panyakum	KO	4 (10)	2020-12-05	(Thailand) Workpoint Studio, Bang Phun	For ABC Super flyweight title
70	Loss	60–10	(Thailand) Nonthasith Petchnamthong	UD	10 (10)	2020-10-31	(Thailand) Suamlum Night Bazaar, Ratchadaphisek, Bangkok	
69	Loss	60–9	(Thailand) Thananchai Charunphak	TKO	9 (10)	2020-03-07	(Thailand) Workpoint Studio, Bang Phun	
68	Loss	60–8	(China) Wenfeng Ge	UD	12 (12)	2019-10-26	(China) Yubei Stadium, Chongqing	
67	Win	60–7	(Thailand) Gerttipong Kumsahwat	TKO	4 (8)	2019-05-26	(Thailand) Singmanassak Muaythai School, Pathum Thani	
66	Loss	59–7	(China) Jing Xiang	UD	12 (12)	2019-01-05	(China) Suzhou Olympic sport center, Suzhou	
65	Loss	59–6	(Thailand) Siridech Deebook	UD	12 (12)	2018-06-23	(Thailand) Workpoint Studio, Bang Phun	
64	Win	59–5	(Thailand) Siridech Deebook	SD	12 (12)	2018-03-24	(Thailand) Workpoint Studio, Bang Phun	
63	Win	58–5	(Indonesia) Frans Damur Palue	RTD	7 (12)	2016-09-09	(Thailand) Suamlum Night Bazaar, Ratchadaphisek, Bangkok	
62	Win	57–5	(Indonesia) Silem Serang	KO	4 (6)	2016-05-06	(Thailand) Suamlum Night Bazaar, Ratchadaphisek, Bangkok	
61	Win	56–5	(Indonesia) Heri Amol	UD	6 (6)	2015-12-05	(Thailand) Royal Square, Bangkok	
60	Win	55–5	(Indonesia) Espinos Sabu	UD	6 (6)	2015-11-06	(Thailand) Singkorn Border Pass, Prachuap Khiri Khan	
59	Win	54–5	(Indonesia) Ical Tobida	TKO	4 (6)	2015-10-03	(Thailand) Ban Rai Temple, Nakhon Ratchasima	
58	Win	53–5	(Philippines) Jopher Marayan	UD	12 (12)	2015-08-21	(Thailand) Sawan Vegas Hotel, Suwannakhet	
57	Win	52–5	(Indonesia) Domi Nenokeba	KO	3 (6)	2015-06-13	(Thailand) Wat Ban Rai, Wangnamkeo, Nakhon Ratchasima	
56	Win	51–5	(Laos) Fahpratan Kwanjaisrikot	KO	2 (6)	2015-05-12	(Thailand) 11th Inf Reg, Bangkok	
55	Loss	50–5	(Japan) Koki Eto	UD	12 (12)	2013-08-01	(Thailand) Bangkok	Lost WBA Interim Flyweight title
54	Win	50–4	(Venezuela) Jean Piero Pérez	TKO	6 (12)	2013-04-26	(Thailand) Khon Kaen	Won WBA Interim Flyweight title
53	Win	49–4	(Thailand) Narongnoy Patanakan Gym	TKO	3 (6)	2013-02-13	(Thailand) Pratunampra-in, Wang Noi	
52	Win	48–4	(Thailand) Kongpipop Sithpracha	TKO	2 (6)	2012-12-28	(Thailand) Chom Thong District Office, Bangkok	
51	Win	47–4	(Indonesia) Johan Wahyudi	TKO	6 (10)	2012-12-03	(Thailand) 11th Inf Reg, Bangkok	
50	Loss	46–4	(Mexico) Adrián Hernández	TKO	6 (12)	2012-10-06	(Mexico) Centro de Convenciones, Toluca	Lost WBC Light flyweight title
49	Win	46–3	(India) Manoj Kumar	TKO	3 (6)	2012-09-05	(Thailand) Bangkapi School, Bangkapi, Bangkok	
48	Win	45–3	(Philippines) Jonathan Taconing	TD	5 (12)	2012-05-03	(Thailand) Provincial Hall, Buriram	Retained WBC Light flyweight title
47	Win	44–3	(Mexico) Adrián Hernández	KO	10 (12)	2011-12-23	(Thailand) 11th Inf Reg, Bangkok	Won WBC Light flyweight title
46	Win	43–3	(Indonesia) Agus Situmorang	TKO	3 (6)	2011-10-21	(Thailand) 11th Inf Reg, Bangkok	
45	Win	42–3	(Thailand) Big M Or Boonchuay	TKO	4 (6)	2011-08-26	(Thailand) Chom Thong District Office, Bangkok	
44	Win	41–3	(Indonesia) Ricky Manufoe	TKO	4 (6)	2011-06-24	(Thailand) Chokchai 4 Market, Bangkok	
43	Win	40–3	(Philippines) Michael Rodriguez	UD	6 (6)	2011-04-29	(Thailand) E-sarn University, Khon Kaen	
42	Win	39–3	(Philippines) Rollen Del Castillo	TD	3 (6)	2011-02-25	(Thailand) Ratchaburi	
41	Win	38–3	(Thailand) Boy Katasila	TKO	2 (6)	2011-01-28	(Thailand) Khao Thong Temple, Phayukha Khiri	
40	Win	37–3	(Indonesia) Pieter Nesi	TKO	4 (6)	2010-11-26	(Thailand) Bangna, Phut Annan Sport Center2, Bangkok	
39	Win	36–3	(Philippines) Rodel Tejares	UD	6 (6)	2010-07-23	(Thailand) Maejo University, Chiang Mai	
38	Win	35–3	(Indonesia) Kid Randal	PTS	6 (6)	2010-06-25	(Thailand) Railway Station Boxing Arena, Sara Buri	
37	Win	34–3	(Philippines) Carlo Camacho	TKO	4 (12)	2009-12-21	(Thailand) Sukhothai Thammathirat University, Muang Thong Thani	
36	Win	33–3	(Indonesia) Yanus Emaury	UD	12 (12)	2009-09-15	(Thailand) Kapong	
35	Win	32–3	(Indonesia) Jack Amisa	KO	5 (12)	2009-03-10	(Thailand) Sawangchao School, Chachoengsao	
34	Win	31–3	(Indonesia) Marti Polii	KO	6 (12)	2008-08-15	(Thailand) Northeasthern Technology School, Khon Kaen	
33	Win	30–3	(Indonesia) Johan Wahyudi	KO	5 (12)	2008-06-16	(Thailand) Thongsuk College, Nakhon Pathom	
32	Win	29–3	(Philippines) Ryan Maliteg	UD	10 (10)	2008-02-14	(Thailand) Pattavikorn Market, Bangkok	
31	Win	28–3	(Thailand) Sornnakrob Sithamnart	UD	6 (6)	2007-10-30	(Thailand) Lumpinee Boxing Stadium, Bangkok	
30	Win	27–3	(Philippines) Wendil Cajoles	TKO	6 (10)	2007-08-01	(Thailand) Por Kungpao Restaurant, Bangkok	
29	Win	26–3	(Indonesia) Edo Resilay	KO	2 (12)	2007-05-28	(Thailand) Nakhon Nayok	
28	Win	25–3	(Indonesia) Little Roseman	KO	3 (12)	2007-04-20	(Thailand) Pattavikorn Market, Bangkok	
27	Win	24–3	(Philippines) Larry Mede	KO	3 (12)	2006-11-28	(Thailand) 13 Coins Restaurant, Minburi	
26	Win	23–3	(Indonesia) Luinika Rodolfo	KO	3 (10)	2006-08-22	(Thailand) Surin	
25	Loss	22–3	(Australia) Hussein Hussein	RTD	4 (10)	2006-05-05	(Thailand) Bellevue Function Centre, Bankstown	
24	Win	22–2	(Philippines) Rick Paciones	KO	1 (6)	2006-03-29	(Thailand) Rongklua Market, Sa Kaeo	
23	Win	21–2	(Thailand) Ongkaraknoi Jittigym	TKO	4 (6)	2006-02-06	(Thailand) 13 Coins Restaurant, Minburi	
22	Win	20–2	(Thailand) Wanchai Sithramkamhaeng	KO	3 (6)	2005-10-13	(Thailand) Second Sanamluang, Bangkok	
21	Win	19–2	(Thailand) Archasuk Sithramkamhaeng	KO	2 (6)	2005-02-04	(Thailand) Lumpinee Boxing Stadium, Bangkok	
20	Win	18–2	(Thailand) Tawan Twingym	TKO	2 (6)	2005-01-11	(Thailand) Lumpinee Boxing Stadium, Bangkok	
19	Win	17–2	(Indonesia) Jack Sole	TKO	7 (12)	2003-12-08	(Thailand) Chachoengsao	
18	Win	16–2	(Philippines) Benjie Sorolla	UD	12 (12)	2003-10-17	(Thailand) Nakhon Pathom	
17	Win	15–2	(Philippines) Larry Mede	UD	6 (6)	2003-05-23	(Thailand) Omnoi Stadium, Samut Sakhon	
16	Win	14–2	(Philippines) Roger Mananquil	UD	6 (6)	2003-02-24	(Thailand) Bangkok	
15	Win	13–2	(Thailand) Maitree Thungsongtaksin	KO	5 (6)	2002-12-31	(Thailand) Rajadamnern Stadium, Bangkok	
14	Win	12–2	(Thailand) Yokkeo Sinchaigym	KO	2 (6)	2002-11-22	(Thailand) Lumpinee Boxing Stadium, Bangkok	
13	Loss	11–2	(Philippines) Allan Ranada	TKO	1 (6)	2002-09-27	(Thailand) Uttaradit	
12	Win	11–1	(Indonesia) Fadly Anwar	KO	2 (6)	2002-08-01	(Thailand) Samut Prakan	
11	Win	10–1	(Philippines) Darius Alfante	UD	6 (6)	2002-04-11	(Cambodia) Princess Crown Hotel, Paoy Paet	
10	Win	9–1	(Thailand) Jockynoi Por Muangubon	KO	2 (6)	2002-01-22	(Thailand) Lumpinee Boxing Stadium, Bangkok	
9	Loss	8–1	(Thailand) Khamhaeng Phanmee	PTS	6 (6)	2001-11-28	(Thailand) Sa Kaeo	
8	Win	8–0	(Thailand) Chansuk Sor Salakchit	PTS	6 (6)	2001-11-10	(Thailand) Lumpinee Boxing Stadium, Bangkok	
7	Win	7–0	(Thailand) Singdej Sithsotorn	KO	1 (6)	2001-08-07	(Thailand) Lumpinee Boxing Stadium, Bangkok	
6	Win	6–0	(Thailand) Lanthongrob Kiatnongluang	KO	1 (6)	2001-06-19	(Thailand) City Gym, Kyoto	
5	Win	5–0	(Thailand) Rittidej Saenghiran	PTS	10 (10)	2001-03-30	(Thailand) Lumpinee Boxing Stadium, Bangkok	
4	Win	4–0	(Thailand) Singsuk Por Lasuor	KO	1 (6)	2000-12-29	(Thailand) Lumpinee Boxing Stadium, Bangkok	
3	Win	3–0	(Thailand) Petnamchai Pradabpan	KO	2 (6)	2000-11-21	(Thailand) Lumpinee Boxing Stadium, Bangkok	
2	Win	2–0	(Thailand) Denpipop Kengkarun	PTS	6 (6)	2000-02-26	(Thailand) Ko Samui	
1	Win	1–0	(Thailand) Payaknoi Wongprasert	KO	1 (6)	2000-01-01	Thailand	

== See also ==
- List of world light-flyweight boxing champions

Sporting positions
World boxing titles
Preceded by Adrián Hernández	WBC Light flyweight champion December 23, 2011 – October 6, 2012	Succeeded by Adrián Hernández
Vacant Title last held by Juan Carlos Reveco	WBA Flyweight champion Interim title April 26, 2013 – August 1, 2013	Succeeded by Koki Eto
