= Evelia Edith Oyhenart =

Argentine anthropologist (1955–2021)

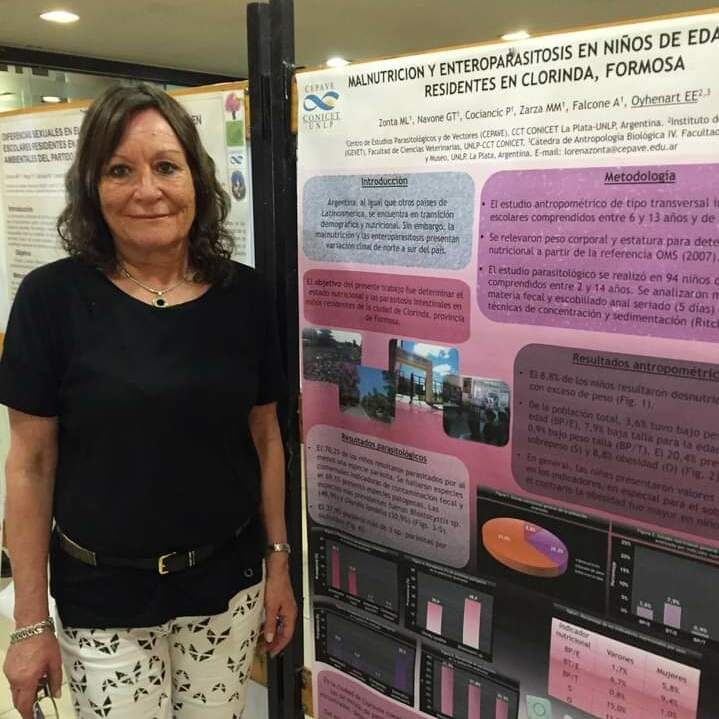
- Born: 3 August 1955
- Died: 25 January 2021 (aged 65)
- Occupation: Biological anthropologist

Evelia Edith Oyhenart (pen name, E. E. Oyhenart; August 3, 1955 – January 25, 2021) was an Argentine biological anthropologist, whose research focused on child growth, nutrition, and human adaptation. She served as a full professor, dean, and vice-dean of the Faculty of Natural Sciences and Museum (FCNyM) of the National University of La Plata (UNLP). She was also the director of the Ontogeny and Adaptation Research Laboratory (LINOA) at UNLP.

== Biography ==
Evelia Edith Oyhenart (nickname, "Chichi") was born in General Alvear, Mendoza August 3, 1955. She received her degree in anthropology in 1979 at the Faculty of Natural Sciences and Museum of the UNLP. In 1988, she obtained her Ph.D. degree at the same university; her thesis was entitled Estudio experimental del dimorfismo craneano racial y sexual y su alteración por efecto del mestizaje (Experimental study of racial and sexual cranial dimorphism and its alteration by the effect of miscegenation). She was trained in biological anthropology research by the anthropologist Héctor Mario Pucciarelli.

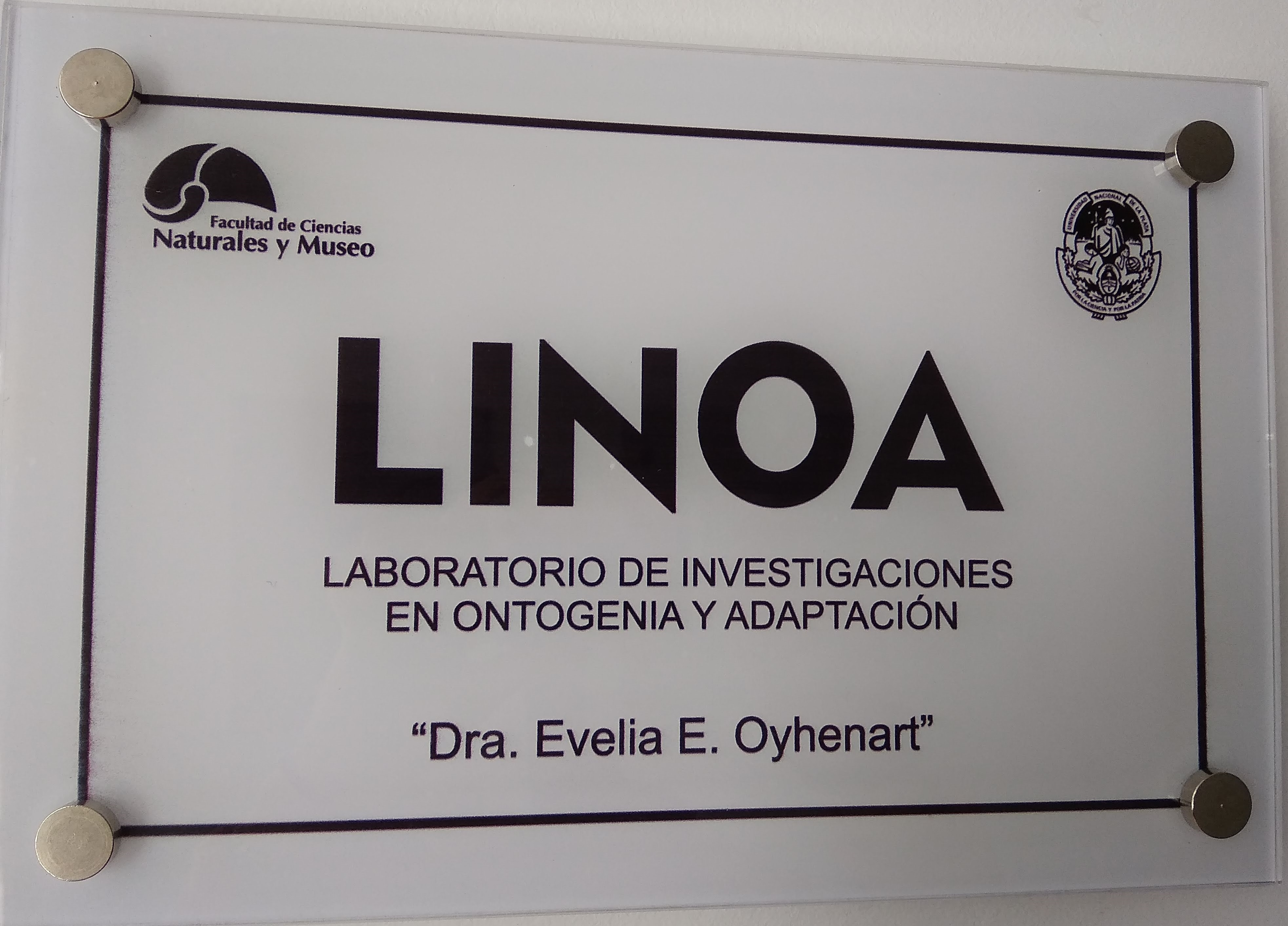
The Ontogeny and Adaptation Research Laboratory (LINOA) bears the name of Dr. Evelia Edith Oyhenart, who promoted its creation and served as its director until the beginning of 2021.

Oyhenart was a member of the National Scientific and Technical Research Council (CONICET), working at the Instituto de Genética Veterinaria “Ingeniero Fernando Noel Dulout” (IGEVET). Within the field of experimental anthropology, her main line of research was the study of growth, development, and nutritional status in the infant population. Oyhenart taught at UNLP's Faculty of Medical Sciences (FCM) and the FCNyM, as well as at the National University of Central Buenos Aires (UNICEN).She held numerous positions in her academic life. She was the founder of the Argentine Biological Anthropology Association and served as its president 1997–99. Between 2000 and 2018, she was president of the Latin American Association of Biological Anthropology. She was elected as dean of the UNLP FCNyM, serving in that position from 2007 to 2010, continuing as vice-dean between 2010 and 2014. Since 2019, she served as director of the Laboratory for Research in Ontogeny and Adaptation (LINOA), at UNLP FCNyM. Oyhenart played an important role in training others in her area of expertise, directing several doctoral theses and undergraduate dissertations.

Writing as E. E. Oyhenart, she published more than 100 articles in journals and books on her specialty; some of them were published posthumously. She gave courses and conferences at national and international level. She died in La Plata, January 25, 2021. Her death was mourned by the university community.

== Awards and honours ==
- Award: "Professor Domingo Mansi" granted by the Asociación Rioplatense de Anatomía. Mar del Plata (Buenos Aires). 1982. Title of the work: "Protein-mineral variation in cranial bones caused by different levels of protein-caloric intake".
- Award: "Best Experimental Study" awarded by Pharmacia & Upjohn. 25th International Symposium Growth Hormone and Growth Factors in Endocrinology and Metabolism. Istanbul. 1998. Title of the work: "Growth hormone (r-hGH) effects on rats with intrauterine growth retardation (IUGR)".
- Paper Citation: Postnatal Recovery Rate of Body Weight in Growth Hormone (GH)-treated Intrauterine Growth Retarded Rats. Guimarey, L.; Oyhenart, E.E.; Quintero, F.; Fucini, M. XXXVI Reuniao Da Sociedade Latinoamericana de Investigacao Pediatrica,1998.
- Award to the Scientific Work as a Trained Researcher 2010 Universidad Nacional de La Plata
