= Stamp Kiatniwat =

Thai boxer

Personal information
- Nationality: Thai
- Born: Yutthana Kaensa; 7 January 1998 (age 28) Mueang Ubon Ratchathani District (now Lao Suea Kok District), Ubon Ratchathani Province, Thailand
- Height: 161 cm (5 ft 3 in)
- Weight: Minimumweight; Light flyweight Flyweight

Boxing career
- Reach: 165 cm (65 in)
- Stance: Orthodox

Boxing record
- Total fights: 29
- Wins: 24
- Win by KO: 10
- Losses: 5

Yutthana Kaensa (Thai: ยุทธนา แก่นสา, born 7 January 1998), also known as Stamp Kiatniwat (แสตมป์ เกียรตินิวัฒน์), Stamp Sithmorseng (แสตมป์ ศิษย์หมอเส็ง), or Stamp Kratingdaenggym (แสตมป์ กระทิงแดงยิม), is a professional Thai boxer in the Flyweight division. At the age of 17, he was considered the youngest Thai world champion, although the title was for an interim championship. He is also a former WBA Asia Flyweight champion.

== Biography and career ==
Yutthana Kaensa, nicknamed Stamp, was born in Lao Suea Kok District (then part of Mueang Ubon Ratchathani District), Ubon Ratchathani Province, and is a cousin of Poonsawat Kratingdaenggym, a former WBA Super Bantamweight world champion.

He won the WPBF Light Flyweight title by defeating fellow Thai boxer Kwanthai Sithmorseng, a former WBA Minimumweight world champion, on August 8, 2014, at Sanam Luang, Bangkok. On September 23 of the same year, he captured the WBA Asia Flyweight title by defeating Samuel Tehuayo, an Indonesian boxer, at Ayutthaya City Park, Ayutthaya Province. He successfully defended this title twice.

On July 29, 2015, he claimed the WBA Flyweight interim title by defeating Gregorio Lebron, a Dominican contender, in Loei Province. He later defended the title against Lebron again on February 9, 2016, at Bangkokthonburi University, Bangkok.

On December 31, 2016, he challenged Kazuto Ioka, the reigning Japanese WBA Flyweight world champion, in an elimination bout at Shimazu Arena, Kyoto, Japan. He lost by TKO in the seventh round.

Stamp regularly trained at the boxing gym inside Bangkokthonburi University with Anant Tualue, the former trainer of Chana Porpaoin (a two-time WBA Minimumweight world champion) and Denkaosan Kaovichit, who held both the WBA Flyweight world title and the WBA Super Flyweight interim title.

On May 18, 2018, Kiatniwat lost the WBA Asia Flyweight title after being defeated by TKO in the second round by Jaysever Abcede, a Filipino contender, at Bangkokthonburi University. After the bout, his manager Niwat "Che-Mae" Laosuwanwat stated he would no longer support Kiatniwat's path to a championship, citing concerns that his body was too fragile.

== Professional boxing record ==
29 fights	24 wins	5 losses
By knockout	10	4
By decision	14	1

No.	Result	Record	Opponent	Type	Round, time	Date	Location	Notes
29	Loss	24–5	Lü Bin	TKO	1 (10), 1:39	16 Mar 2023	Yongkang Sports Center, Yongkang, Zhejiang, China	For vacant WBA International super-flyweight title
28	Win	24–4	Daeloniel McDelon	UD	10	5 Nov 2022	Spaceplus Bangkok RCA, Bangkok, Thailand	Retained ABF Continental bantamweight title
27	Win	23–4	Adisak Ketpiam	TKO	4 (8) 1:31	3 Sep 2022	Spaceplus Bangkok RCA, Bangkok, Thailand	Won vacant ABF Continental bantamweight title
26	Loas	22–4	F. Zoramchhana	MD	6	2 Jul 2022	Spaceplus Bangkok RCA, Bangkok, Thailand	
25	Win	22–3	Lekpetch Lookmhakrodyon111	TKO	2 (6)	4 Jun 2022	Suan Lum Night Bazaar Ratchadaphisek, Bangkok, Thailand	
24	Loss	21–3	Vyacheslav Mirzaev	TKO	5 (10) 2:19	2 Mar 2019	RGK Kapitan, Anapa, Russia	
23	Win	21–2	Rolly Sumalpong	UD	12	10 Aug 2018	Morseng Center, Samut Prakan, Thailand	Won vacant WBA Asia super-flyweight title
22	Loss	20–2	Jaysever Abcede	KO	2 (12) 2:01	15 May 2018	Bangkokthonburi University, Bangkok, Thailand	Lost WBA Asia flyweight title
21	Win	20–1	Macrea Gandionco	KO	4 (12) 2:40	28 Dec 2017	Bangkokthonburi University, Bangkok, Thailand	Retained WBA Asia flyweight title
20	Win	19–1	Michael Enriquez	UD	12	22 Sep 2017	Ayuthaya Night Bazzar, Ayutthaya, Thailand	Retained WBA Asia flyweight title
19	Win	18–1	Michael Enriquez	UD	12	29 Jul 2017	Bangkokthonburi University, Bangkok, Thailand	Won vacant WBA Asia flyweight title
18	Win	17–1	Rajesh	UD	12	17 Mar 2017	ThaUthen Subdistrict Municipality Office, Nakhon Phanom, Thailand	Retained PABA flyweight title
17	Loss	16–1	Kazuto Ioka	KO	7 (12) 2:51	31 Dec 2016	Shimazu Arena, Kyoto, Japan	For WBA flyweight title
16	Win	16–0	Gregorio Lebron	MD	12	9 Sep 2016	Bangkokthonburi University, Bangkok, Thailand	Retained WBA interim flyweight title
15	Win	15–0	Gregorio Lebron	MD	12	29 Jul 2015	Chiang Khan Police Station, Loei, Thailand	Won vacant WBA interim flyweight title
14	Win	14–0	Wilber Andogan	KO	5 (12)	23 Mar 2015	The Society Ayutthaya Resort, Ayutthaya, Thailand	Retained PABA flyweight title
13	Win	13–0	Espinos Sabu	UD	12	2 Jan 2015	Kamkwan Seafood Restaurant, Bangkok, Thailand	Retained PABA flyweight title
12	Win	12–0	Geboi Mansalayao	KO	2 (12)	5 Dec 2014	Sanam Luang, Bangkok, Thailand	Retained PABA flyweight title
11	Win	11–0	Samuel Tehuayo	UD	12	23 Sep 2014	Ayutthaya Park, Ayutthaya, Thailand	Won vacant PABA flyweight title
10	Win	10–0	Kwanthai Sithmorseng	UD	12	8 Aug 2014	Sanam Luang, Bangkok, Thailand	Won vacant WPMF light-flyweight title
9	Win	9–0	Johan Wahyudi	TKO	4 (6)	4 Jul 2014	Provincial Stadium, Phichit, Thailand	
8	Win	8–0	Safwan Lombok	UD	6	1 May 2014	Klangwieng, Phayao, Thailand	
7	Win	7–0	Petchsuksawat Kiatphompetch	TKO	2 (6)	21 Mar 2014	Bueng Kan, Thailand	
6	Win	6–0	Dawut Manoproonroj	TKO	4 (6) 0:35	17 Jan 2014	Watsingmatayon School, Bangkok, Thailand	
5	Win	5–0	John Bima	TKO	1 (6)	26 Nov 2013	Lawoe Technology School, Lopburi, Thailand	
4	Win	4–0	Phompetch Kilasportsgym	PTS	6	17 Sep 2013	Bangkokthonburi University, Bangkok, Thailand	
3	Win	3–0	Auto Golf Snooker	PTS	6	23 Aug 2013	Siam Amazing Park, Bangkok, Thailand	
2	Win	2–0	Petchprakaifa Sor Visetkit	TKO	1 (6)	28 May 2013	Wat Phrasaeng, Surat Thani, Thailand	
1	Win	1–0	Jaokhumphol Kaolanlek Gym	PTS	6	18 Apr 2013	Ayutthaya Park, Ayutthaya, Thailand	

Preceded by Yodmongkol CP Freshmart	WBA Flyweight Champion; Interim Title; July 29, 2015 – December 31, 2016; Lost bid for full title	Vacant Title next held by Luis Concepción
