= Jeyvier Cintrón =

Puerto Rican boxer

Personal information
- Nickname: Perrito
- Born: Jeyvier Jesús Cintrón Ocasio; February 8, 1995 (age 31) Bayamón, Puerto Rico
- Height: 5 ft 8 in (173 cm)
- Weight: Junior bantamweight; Bantamweight

Boxing career
- Reach: 70 1/2 in (179 cm)
- Stance: Southpaw

Boxing record
- Total fights: 15
- Wins: 13
- Win by KO: 6
- Losses: 1
- No contests: 1
Medal record
Men's amateur boxing
Representing Puerto Rico
Youth World Championships
Silver medal – second place	2012 Yerevan	Flyweight
Central American and Caribbean Games
Bronze medal – third place	2014 Veracruz	Flyweight Winner of Exatlon 2021.

Jeyvier Jesús Cintrón Ocasio (born February 8, 1995) is a Puerto Rican professional boxer who challenged for the WBO junior bantamweight title in 2019. As an amateur, Cintrón represented Puerto Rico at the 2012 and 2016 Olympics as a flyweight.

== Early life ==
Cintrón was born to Javier Cintrón, a former professional boxer known by the nickname of "El Perrito" who was involved in series with José López and Carlos Valcárcel, and amateur boxing referee and judge Aracelis Ocasio. He was captivated by the family's trade from a young age, wearing boxing apparel to school activities, and was followed in his interest by younger brother Jeyvison. Feeling that it ran in the blood and that they owed a lot to the sport, Cintrón opted to become a self-professed "boxing scholar", immersing himself in the study of a variety of styles that he later tried to mimic and master. Since then, his parents were already planning to eventually train him and would frequently voice their goal of seeing him at the Olympics.

== Amateur career ==
Cintrón won the 48 kg division of the 2011 junior Puerto Rico national championship, defeating Armando Mendez in the semi-finals and Jorge Cosme in the finals. He went on to participate in the 2011 Panamerican Junior Championships, where he defeated Miguel Shiguango of Ecuador with scores of 17:11. Cintron was eliminated in the semifinals, losing to Elvis Rodriguez 22:13 to finish third. He repeated this performance at the 2011 Golden Belt Junior Tournament, where he lost to Victor Santillan 11:10 in the semifinal.

Cintrón entered the senior national boxing team at the age of 17 by defeating the 2010 AIBA Youth Olympics Champion, Emmanuel Rodríguez twice, once to win the senior national championship and the second to secure his space in the team. Shortly after winning these contests, he received several offers to become a professional.

While still a youth competitor, Cintrón entered open class tournaments and became the bronze medalist at the 2012 Independence Cup. He opened his participation with a 24:16 victory over Dyulus Yakovlev of Russia during the preliminary round. Cintrón advanced with a 5:0 win against José Meza of Ecuador. In the semifinals, he lost to local boxer Dagoberto Aguero 4:1. In May 2012, Cintrón qualified for the 2012 Summer Olympics by winning the gold medal at the 2012 American Boxing Olympic Qualification Tournament. In the preliminary round he defeated Amrit Herrera of Panama 17:5. Cintrón advanced with a 16:7 win over Kenny Lally of Canada in the quarterfinals. He faced Eddie Valenzuela of Guatemala during the following stage, winning 12:6. In his final contest Cintrón defeated Juliao Neto of Brazil 19:10. During his preparation he participated in duals against Mexico and Canada, scoring wins over Juan Carlos Rodríguez (19:9) and Lally (13:10) respectively. Cintron also won the 2012 Juan Evangelista Venegas Olympic Cup, defeating Edwin Rodríguez 17:16 in the finals.

At the 2012 Summer Olympics, Cintrón defeated Botswanan Oteng Oteng in the first round with a score of 14-12. On the second round, he defeated Brazilian Juliao Henriques with a score of 18–13. Cintrón was eliminated in the quarter-finals by Russian Misha Aloyan, with a score of 23–13. Upon returning to the Olympic village he was approached by several professional boxing scouts, among which was personnel from Golden Boy Promotions.

In December 2012, Cintrón won the silver medal at the 2012 AIBA Youth World Boxing Championships in Yerevan, Armenia. Cintrón was defeated by English Oliver Simpson.

A change in AIBA's rules preventing boxers under the age of 19 from competing in senior tournaments directly affected Cintrón. Despite being unable to compete internationally, he remained active in Puerto Rico and trained throughout 2013. Cintrón entered the Torneo Isaac Barrientos and won the flyweight national championship by defeating fellow Olympian Janthony Ortiz in the finals. Despite losing, Ortiz was sent to the 2013 AIBA World Boxing Championships due to the age criteria. At the 2013 Juan Evangelista Venegas Olympic Cup, Cintrón defeated Leonardo Baez of Mexico by unanimous decision in the finals. He entered the 2014 Isaac Barrientos tournament, debuting with a victory over Orlando González. Cintrón advanced by knocking Carlos Caraballo out in the semifinals. In the finals, he was matched against Ortiz, winning a unanimous decision after scoring a knockdown.

In the qualifier for the 2014 Central American and Caribbean Games, Cintrón debuted by defeating Gerardo Cervantes of Cuba 2 rounds to one. He qualified by winning his semifinal over Gerardo Valdés of the Dominican Republic, 2-1. Cintrón won the tournament's gold medal by defeating Ceiber Ávila of Colombia. At the 2014 José Aponte Cup, he advanced to the final by defeating Patrick Louren of Brasil. Cintrón won the tournament by defeating Orlando González.

== Professional career ==
=== Early career ===
Cintrón signed with Top Rank on February 8, 2017, in Las Vegas, Nevada. Cintrón is trained by former world champion and fellow countryman, Iván Calderón.

On 25 May 2019, Cintron fought Koki Eto for the vacant WBO international junior bantamweight title. Eto managed to knock out Cintron 2:03 into the first round with a big right hand. Cintron was left floored and clueless, but in the end was complaining to the referee about a headbutt he had received just before the right hand. The referee dismissed Cintron's claims. However, after a careful review, the WBO announced that a headbutt was clearly the reason for Cintron's flooring. The fight was subsequently turned into a no-contest.

The WBO called for a rematch, which would also be a WBO junior bantamweight title eliminator. Cintron was dominant in the rematch, showing off his superior boxing skills, as well as his power. Cintron managed to drop his opponent 20 seconds into the second round, from which Eto would never properly recover. Scores were 99-00 on all three of judges' scorecards.

In his first ever title match, Cintron challenged WBO champion Kazuto Ioka for the junior bantamweight title. In an action-packed fight, Cintron had a great start, utilizing his height and reach to box Ioka from the outside. During the middle rounds, things turned and Ioka started throwing body punches with both hands and managed to make good work on the inside. The punches were slowly wearing Cintron down, and even though he showed some heart in the last round, Ioka ended up the clear winner by unanimous decision.

== Professional boxing record ==
16 fights	14 wins	1 loss
By knockout	7	0
By decision	6	1
By disqualification	1	0
No contests	1	

No.	Result	Record	Opponent	Type	Round, time	Date	Location	Notes
16	Win	14–1 (1)	Víctor Efrain Sandoval	TKO	1 (10), 2:40	Jan 10, 2026	Barclays Center, New York City, New York, U.S.	
15	Win	13–1 (1)	Rashib Martínez Valadez	UD	10	Nov 9, 2024	Coliseo Rubén Rodríguez, Bayamón, Puerto Rico	Won vacant WBO International bantamweight title
14	Win	12–1 (1)	Carlos Mujica	TKO	1 (10), 2:22	Jun 15, 2024	Coliseo Juan Aubin Cruz Abreu, Manatí, Puerto Rico	
13	Loss	11–1 (1)	Kazuto Ioka	UD	12	Dec 31, 2019	Ota City General Gymnasium, Tokyo, Japan	For WBO junior bantamweight title
12	Win	11–0 (1)	Koki Eto	UD	10	Aug 2, 2019	Osceola Heritage Center, Kissimmee, Florida, U.S.	Won vacant WBO International junior bantamweight title
11	NC	10–0 (1)	Koki Eto	NC	1 (10), 2:39	May 25, 2019	Osceola Heritage Center, Kissimmee, Florida, U.S.	Vacant WBO International junior bantamweight title at stake; Originally a TKO win for Eto, later ruled a NC after an incorrect referee call
10	Win	10–0	Eliecer Quezada	TKO	1 (10), 2:01	Mar 29, 2019	Cancha Rubén Zayas Montañez, Trujillo Alto, Puerto Rico	Retained WBO Latino junior bantamweight title
9	Win	9–0	Marvin Solano	DQ	8 (10), 1:01	Dec 7, 2018	Cancha Rubén Zayas Montañez, Trujillo Alto, Puerto Rico	Retained WBO Latino junior bantamweight title; Solano disqualified for repeated fouls
8	Win	8–0	Alonso Meléndez	UD	10	Sep 1, 2018	Sheraton Hotel & Casino, San Juan, Puerto Rico	Won vacant WBO Latino junior bantamweight title
7	Win	7–0	Gregory Vera	UD	8	Jul 27, 2018	Hotel El Prado, Barranquilla, Colombia	Won vacant WBO Youth bantamweight title
6	Win	6–0	Omni Padilla	RTD	3 (6), 3:00	Jun 2, 2018	Plaza Central, Palmar de Varela, Colombia	
5	Win	5–0	Jonathan Burgos	TKO	4 (6), 2:59	Apr 27, 2018	Hotel El Prado, Barranquilla, Colombia	
4	Win	4–0	Aneudy Matos	TKO	3 (4), 0:19	Mar 17, 2018	Hotel Jaragua, Santo Domingo, Dominican Republic	
3	Win	3–0	Edson Neri	UD	6	Feb 23, 2018	Osceola Heritage Center, Kissimmee, Florida, U.S.	
2	Win	2–0	Guillermo Dejeas	KO	2 (4), 2:21	Jul 29, 2017	Sheraton Hotel & Casino, San Juan, Puerto Rico	
1	Win	1–0	Leonardo Reyes	UD	4	Apr 21, 2017	Osceola Heritage Center, Kissimmee, Florida, U.S.	
