= Yodmongkol Vor Saengthep =

Thai boxer

Personal information
- Born: Boonsirichai Thaiyen (บุญศิริชัย ไทยเย็น); December 24, 1990 (age 35) Muak Lek district, Saraburi province, Thailand
- Height: 5 ft 5 1/2 in (166 cm)
- Weight: Light flyweight; Flyweight; Super flyweight

Boxing career
- Stance: Orthodox

Boxing record
- Total fights: 70
- Wins: 65
- Win by KO: 43
- Losses: 5

Sirichai Thaiyen or Yodmongkol Vor Saengthep or Yodmongkol CP Freshmart (Thai: ยอดมงคล ว.แสงเทพ, ยอดมงคล ซีพีเฟรชมาร์ท; nicknamed: Gig, กิ๊ก; born: December 24, 1990 in Muak Lek District, Saraburi Province) is a professional boxer from Thailand. He is the former interim WBA Flyweight champion.

== Career history ==
Vor Saengthep began fighting professionally in 2009. He successfully challenged for WBA interim title in Flyweight weight class against Koki Eto from Japan by TKO in round 12 on November 29, 2013, at City Hall Ground, Chonburi, Thailand. On December 20, 2014, he lost to Juan Carlos Reveco by TKO in the round 5 for WBA world champion title in Flyweight weight class at Polideportivo Gustavo Toro Rodríguez, San Martín, Mendoza, Argentina to decide a true champion.

On June 17, 2018, he faced Artem Dalakian undefeated Ukrainian WBA Flyweight world title holder in Kyiv, as no. 1 challenger. In this time, he has two former WBC world champions, Sirimongkol Singwangcha and Oleydong Sithsamerchai as a boxing partners. The result is that he was knockdown 3 times before defeated TKO in round 8.

On June 24, 2023 he would lose via knockout to former WBC flyweight champion Daigo Higa.

== Professional boxing record ==
| 70 fights | 65 wins | 5 losses |
|---|---|---|
| By knockout | 43 | 3 |
| By decision | 22 | 2 |

| No. | Result | Record | Opponent | Type | Round, time | Date | Location | Notes |
|---|---|---|---|---|---|---|---|---|
| 70 | Loss | 65–5 | Daigo Higa | KO | 4 (10), 1:34 | 24 Jun 2023 | Ota City General Gymnasium, Tokyo, Japan | |
| 69 | Win | 65–4 | Woravit Pinpradab | TKO | 1 (6), 1:23 | 22 Mar 2023 | Rangsit Stadium, Rangsit, Thailand | |
| 68 | Win | 64–4 | Samartlek Kokietgym | UD | 10 | 7 Sep 2022 | Muaklek Technical College, Muak Lek, Thailand | Retained ABF super flyweight title |
| 67 | Win | 63–4 | Chindanai Chaimoon | TKO | 2 (6), 1:49 | 28 Jun 2022 | Rangsit Stadium, Rangsit, Thailand | |
| 66 | Win | 62–4 | Samartlek Kokietgym | UD | 10 | 8 Mar 2022 | Rangsit Stadium, Rangsit, Thailand | Won ABF super-flyweight title |
| 65 | Win | 61–4 | Thanawat Yancharoen | UD | 6 | 14 Dec 2021 | Saphan Hin, Phuket, Thailand | |
| 64 | Win | 60–4 | Prayong Baenrap | TKO | 2 (6), 1:53 | 2 Nov 2011 | City Hall Ground, Nakhon Sawan, Thailand | |
| 63 | Win | 59–4 | Thanawat Yanchareon | TKO | 3 (6), 1:24 | 4 Apr 2021 | Rangsit Stadium, Rangsit, Thailand | |
| 62 | Win | 58–4 | Decha Puttaluska | TKO | 2 (6), 1:25 | 25 Sep 2020 | Rangsit Stadium, Rangsit, Thailand | |
| 61 | Win | 57–4 | Ali Mortazavi | UD | 6 | 24 Jan 2020 | Siam Paradise Entertainment Centre, Bangkok, Thailand | |
| 60 | Win | 56–4 | Abolfazl Abdolmaleki | TKO | 2 (6) | 29 Nov 2019 | Sintawee Village, Jomthong, Bangkok, Thailand | |
| 59 | Win | 55–4 | Mateo Handig | UD | 10 | 19 Jul 2019 | JBAC College, Klongsamwa, Bangkok, Thailand | Won vacant OPBF silver super flyweight title |
| 58 | Win | 54–4 | Dionatha Santos Tobias | UD | 6 | 31 May 2019 | City Hall, Chachoengsao, Thailand | |
| 57 | Win | 53–4 | Saenrachan Sor Theptanee | TKO | 3 (6) | 24 Apr 2019 | City Hall, Saraburi, Thailand | |
| 56 | Win | 52–4 | Ankhbayar Enkhbayar | UD | 6 | 22 Feb 2019 | Siam Paradise Entertainment Centre, Bangkok, Thailand | |
| 55 | Win | 51–4 | Wongsakorn Thongsri | TKO | 4 (6), 1:45 | 12 Oct 2018 | Rangsit International Stadium, Rangsit, Thailand | |
| 54 | Loss | 50–4 | Artem Dalakian | TKO | 8 (12), 2:54 | 17 Jun 2018 | Parkovy Convention Centre, Kiev, Ukraine | For WBA (Regular) flyweight title |
| 53 | Win | 50–3 | Yodkhuntap Singmanasak | TKO | 3 (6) | 6 Mar 2018 | Chonburi Provincial Ground, Chonburi, Thailand | |
| 52 | Win | 49–3 | Marten Kisamlu | RTD | 4 (8), 2:26 | 26 Jan 2018 | Rangsit Stadium, Rangsit, Thailand | |
| 51 | Win | 48–3 | Said Fahdafi | TKO | 3 (6), 1:00 | 24 Nov 2017 | Suranaree Camp Stadium, Nakhon Ratchasima, Thailand | |
| 50 | Win | 47–3 | Muhammad Azizi | KO | 2 (6), 1:54 | 21 Jul 2017 | Siam Paradise Entertainment Centre, Bangkok, Thailand | |
| 49 | Win | 46–3 | Gaurav Singh | TKO | 5 (6) | 26 May 2017 | Ayutthaya Park, Ayutthaya, Thailand | |
| 48 | Win | 45–3 | Khusanboy Abdullaev | TKO | 2 (6) | 1 Mar 2017 | Chonburi Provincial Ground, Chonburi, Thailand | |
| 47 | Win | 44–3 | John Rey Lauza | UD | 12 | 27 Jan 2017 | Phitsanulok Provincial Ground, Phitsanulok, Thailand | Retained PABA flyweight title |
| 46 | Win | 43–3 | Arshak Vardanyan | KO | 4 (6) | 25 Nov 2016 | Nakhon Sawan Municipality Ground, Nakhon Sawan, Thailand | |
| 45 | Win | 42–3 | Domi Nenokeba | RTD | 8 (12), 3:00 | 30 Sep 2016 | Ayutthaya Park, Ayutthaya, Thailand | Retained PABA flyweight title |
| 44 | Win | 41–3 | Ical Tobida | TKO | 3 (12), 1:13 | 24 Jun 2016 | Lee Gargen Hotel, Hat Yai, Thailand | Retained PABA flyweight title |
| 43 | Win | 40–3 | Somkiat Hemwijit | KO | 3 (6) | 27 May 2016 | Ayutthaya Night Bazzar, Ayutthaya, Thailand | |
| 42 | Win | 39–3 | Samuel Tehuayo | KO | 8 (12) | 25 Mar 2016 | Chokchai 4 Market, Bangkok, Thailand | Retained PABA flyweight title |
| 41 | Win | 38–3 | Silem Serang | TKO | 5 (6) | 4 Feb 2016 | City Hall Ground, Chonburi, Thailand | |
| 40 | Win | 37–3 | Iwan Key | TKO | 5 (12) | 27 Nov 2015 | City Hall, Saraburi, Thailand | Won PABA flyweight title |
| 39 | Win | 36–3 | Edo Anggoro | KO | 3 (12) | 8 Oct 2015 | Siam Paradise Entertainment Centre, Bangkok, Thailand | |
| 38 | Win | 35–3 | Jopher Marayan | TKO | 4 (12), 2:14 | 24 Apr 2015 | Siam Paradise Entertainment Centre, Bangkok, Thailand | |
| 37 | Loss | 34–3 | Juan Carlos Reveco | TKO | 5 (12), 1:40 | 19 Dec 2014 | Polideportivo Gustavo Toro Rodriguez, San Martin, Argentina | For WBA (Regular) flyweight title |
| 36 | Win | 34–2 | Takuya Kogawa | MD | 12 | 4 Mar 2014 | Suranaree Army Camp Stadium, Nakhon Ratchasima, Thailand | Retained WBA interim flyweight title |
| 35 | Win | 33–2 | Koki Eto | TKO | 12 (12), 0:52 | 29 Nov 2013 | City Hall Ground, Chonburi, Thailand | Won WBA Interim flyweight title |
| 34 | Win | 32–2 | Anand | UD | 10 | 27 Sep 2013 | Chom Thong District Office, Bangkok, Thailand | Retained WBC youth light flyweight title |
| 33 | Win | 31–2 | Samuel Tehuayo | TKO | 5 (6) | 1 Aug 2013 | Bangkok, Thailand | |
| 32 | Win | 30–2 | Jerson Luzarito | UD | 10 | 28 Jun 2013 | City Hall, Songkhram, Thailand | Retained WBC youth light flyweight title |
| 31 | Win | 29–2 | Jerry Tomogdan | TD | 5 (10), 2:10 | 26 Apr 2013 | Khon Kaen, Thailand | Retained WBC youth light flyweight title |
| 30 | Win | 28–2 | Boy Katasila | TKO | 3 (6) | 12 Mar 2012 | Big C Shopping Center, Kubon 3, Bangkok, Thailand | |
| 29 | Win | 27–2 | Crison Omayao | KO | 7 (10) | 25 Jan 2013 | Wat Bannamtieng, Maha Sarakham, Thailand | Retained WBC youth light flyweight title |
| 28 | Win | 26–2 | Narongnoy Patanakan Gym | TKO | 2 (6) | 28 Dec 2012 | Chom Thong District Office, Bangkok, Thailand | |
| 27 | Win | 25–2 | Samuel Tehuayo | TKO | 6 (10) | 12 Nov 2012 | Central Pavilion, Saraburi, Thailand | Retained WBC youth light flyweight title |
| 26 | Win | 24–2 | Asad Asif Khan | KO | 4 (10) | 5 Sep 2012 | Bangkapi School, Bangkapi, Bangkok, Thailand | Retained WBC youth light flyweight title |
| 25 | Win | 23–2 | Veeradej Manoprungroj | TKO | 3 (6), 1:06 | 27 Jul 2012 | Amphawa District Office, Samut Songkhram, Thailand | |
| 24 | Win | 22–2 | Jack Amisa | RTD | 6 (10), 2:20 | 31 May 2012 | City Hall Ground, Chonburi, Thailand | Retained WBC youth light flyweight title |
| 23 | Win | 21–2 | Edison Berwela | PTS | 6 | 24 Feb 2012 | Siam Society Hotel and Resort, Bangkok, Thailand | |
| 22 | Win | 20–2 | Rollen Del Castillo | KO | 5 (6), 0:16 | 27 Jan 2012 | Chom Thong District Office, Bangkok, Thailand | |
| 21 | Win | 19–2 | Silapathep Lookmahathat | PTS | 6 | 23 Dec 2011 | 11th Inf Reg, Bangkok, Thailand | |
| 20 | Win | 18–2 | Jack Amisa | TD | 5 (10), 1:59 | 11 Nov 2011 | Thabo, Nong Khai, Thailand | Retained WBC Youth light flyweight title |
| 19 | Win | 17–2 | Sheng Peng | TKO | 3 (10), 2:07 | 26 Aug 2011 | Chom Thong District Office, Bangkok, Thailand | Retained WBC Youth light flyweight title |
| 18 | Win | 16–2 | Roger Echavez | UD | 6 | 29 Jul 2011 | Wat Sakae School, Uthai, Thailand | |
| 17 | Win | 15–2 | Roilo Golez | UD | 10 | 27 May 2011 | Nihonmachi, Sukhumvit Soi 26, Bangkok, Thailand | Retained WBC Youth light-flyweight title |
| 16 | Win | 14–2 | Donny Mabao | UD | 10 | 25 Mar 2011 | Saraburi, Thailand | Retained WBC Youth light-flyweight title |
| 15 | Win | 13–2 | Lionel Mark Duran | UD | 10 | 25 Feb 2011 | Ratchaburi, Thailand | Retained WBC Youth light flyweight title |
| 14 | Win | 12–2 | Jomhod Eminentair | KO | 3 (6), 0:41 | 6 Jan 2011 | Central Stadium, Nakhon Phanom, Thailand | |
| 13 | Win | 11–2 | Sofyan Effendi | UD | 10 | 26 Nov 2010 | Bangna, Phut Annan Sport Center2, Bangkok, Thailand | Retained WBC Youth light-flyweight title |
| 12 | Win | 10–2 | Justin Golden Boy | PTS | 6 | 24 Sep 2010 | Siam Society Hotel and Resort, Bangkok, Thailand | |
| 11 | Win | 9–2 | Heri Purnomo | KO | 7 (10), 1:27 | 27 Aug 2010 | E-sarn University, Khon Kaen, Thailand | Won vacant WBC Youth light-flyweight title |
| 10 | Win | 8–2 | Daensarakham Manoproj | TKO | 1 (6), 0:45 | 25 Jun 2010 | Railway Station Boxing Arena, Saraburi, Thailand | |
| 9 | Win | 7–2 | Chatri Sariphan | TKO | 3 (6) | 27 May 2010 | Chokchai 4 Market, Bangkok, Thailand | |
| 8 | Loss | 6–2 | Sornsuknai PKP Stereo | PTS | 6 | 21 Apr 2010 | Rajadamnern Stadium, Bangkok, Thailand | |
| 7 | Win | 6–1 | Loyma Sithoar | KO | 4 (6) | 20 Mar 2010 | Lumpinee Boxing Stadium, Bangkok, Thailand | |
| 6 | Win | 5–1 | Petchbarngborn Kokietgym | PTS | 6 | 19 Feb 2010 | Pathumthani University, Pathumthani, Thailand | |
| 5 | Win | 4–1 | Ponchai Sithsamart | KO | 2 (6) | 21 Dec 2009 | STOU, Muang Thong Thani, Thailand | |
| 4 | Loss | 3–1 | Yodgoen CP Freshmart | PTS | 6 | 25 Sep 2009 | 11th Inf Reg, Bangkok, Thailand | |
| 3 | Win | 3–0 | Sarawut Taddon | KO | 3 (6) | 19 May 2009 | Lumpinee Boxing Stadium, Bangkok, Thailand | |
| 2 | Win | 2–0 | Manopchai Sithsaithong | KO | 2 (6) | 31 Mar 2009 | Lumpinee Boxing Stadium, Bangkok, Thailand | |
| 1 | Win | 1–0 | Yodplaithong Meanburi | KO | 4 (6) | 5 Mar 2009 | Rajadamnern Stadium, Bangkok, Thailand | |

Sporting positions
Regional boxing titles
| Vacant Title last held by Narast Aienleng | WBC Youth light-flyweight champion August 27, 2010 – 2013; Vacated | Vacant Title next held by Jakrawut Majungoen |
| Vacant Title last held by Young Gil Bae | PABA flyweight champion November 27, 2015 – 2017; Vacated | Vacant |
| Vacant Title last held by Jakrawut Majungoen | OPBF silver super-flyweight champion July 19, 2019 – 2020; Vacated | Vacant |
| Vacant Title last held by Stamp Kiatniwat | Asian Boxing Federation super-flyweight champion September 7, 2022 – 2023; Vacated | Vacant Title next held by Namchai Dilokpraphuek |
World boxing titles
| Preceded by Koki Eto | WBA flyweight champion Interim title November 29, 2013 – December 19, 2014; Lost bid for full title | Vacant Title next held by Stamp Kiatniwat |
