= Cecilia Alvear =

Latina television news journalist

- Born: November 5, 1939; Galapagos Islands, Ecuador
- Died: April 21, 2017 (aged 77); Los Angeles, California
- Occupations: Latina journalist in television news and the former president of the National Association of Hispanic Journalists

Cecilia Alvear (November 5, 1939 – April 21, 2017) was an Ecuadorian-born American journalist in television news and the former president of the National Association of Hispanic Journalists, as well as a field producer with NBC Network News in Burbank, California.

== Early career ==
Alvear was the network's Mexico City Bureau Chief from 1982 until 1984, the first Latina to serve in that position, when she was transferred to Miami to serve as the senior producer for Latin America. In 1989 she was assigned to the West Coast.

As a producer Alvear covered many major news stories, including the wars in El Salvador and Nicaragua in the 1980s, the Mexico City earthquake in 1985, protests and elections in Chile and Peru, the war on drugs in Bolivia, Peru and Colombia, the Mengele investigation in Brazil, unrest in Panama, two interviews with Fidel Castro in Cuba, the Pan American Games in Havana, the Barcelona Olympics, the Zapatista Army of National Liberation rebellion in Chiapas, the Colosio assassination, and events that have affected the Los Angeles area in recent years: riots, earthquakes and the O. J. Simpson trial.

In 1998 she was part of the NBC News team that reported on Hurricane Mitch in Nicaragua and Honduras. In 1999, she produced stories on Pope John Paul II's visit to Mexico, the earthquake that damaged Armenia, Colombia, and the turnover of the Panama Canal to the Panamanians.

Prior to joining NBC, Alvear worked in the Los Angeles area for all three network-owned local stations. While working at the CBS outlet, KNXT, as a producer for Two on the Town, she was part of a team that won the local Emmy in the best series category.

== Board memberships ==
In the 1970s and early 1980s, Alvear was a board member and vice president of the California Chicano News Media Association, one of the first organizations for Latino journalists. She was honored for her pioneering efforts on behalf of CCNMA at their 1996 Scholarship dinner.

Alvear was a member of the National Association of Hispanic Journalists since the 1980s. She participated in the annual convention as a panelist, speaker and recruiter for NBC News. Alvear was elected vice president-Broadcast in 1996 and represented NAHJ on the board of the Radio-Television News Directors Association. In 2000, she was elected to a two-year term as president of the National Association of Hispanic Journalists. That same year, she was named on the Hispanic Business list of the "100 Most Influential Hispanics in the U.S." In 1995 and 1996, Alvear was Editor at Large of Si, a short-lived magazine depicting the Latino experience in the U.S.

== Awards ==
In 1988, Alvear was one of twelve American journalists chosen for the prestigious Nieman Fellowship at Harvard University where she spent the academic year 1988–89. Alvear was the first Latina to receive the award.

== Personal ==
Born in the Galapagos Islands of Ecuador, Alvear immigrated to the United States in the 1960s and became a U.S. citizen in 1984. She frequently returned to the Galápagos, where she was helping to upgrade the public elementary school first started by her late father, the former military governor of the islands.

== Death ==
Alvear died of breast cancer on April 21, 2017, at the age of 77.
