= General Alvear, Mendoza =

General Alvear
- City
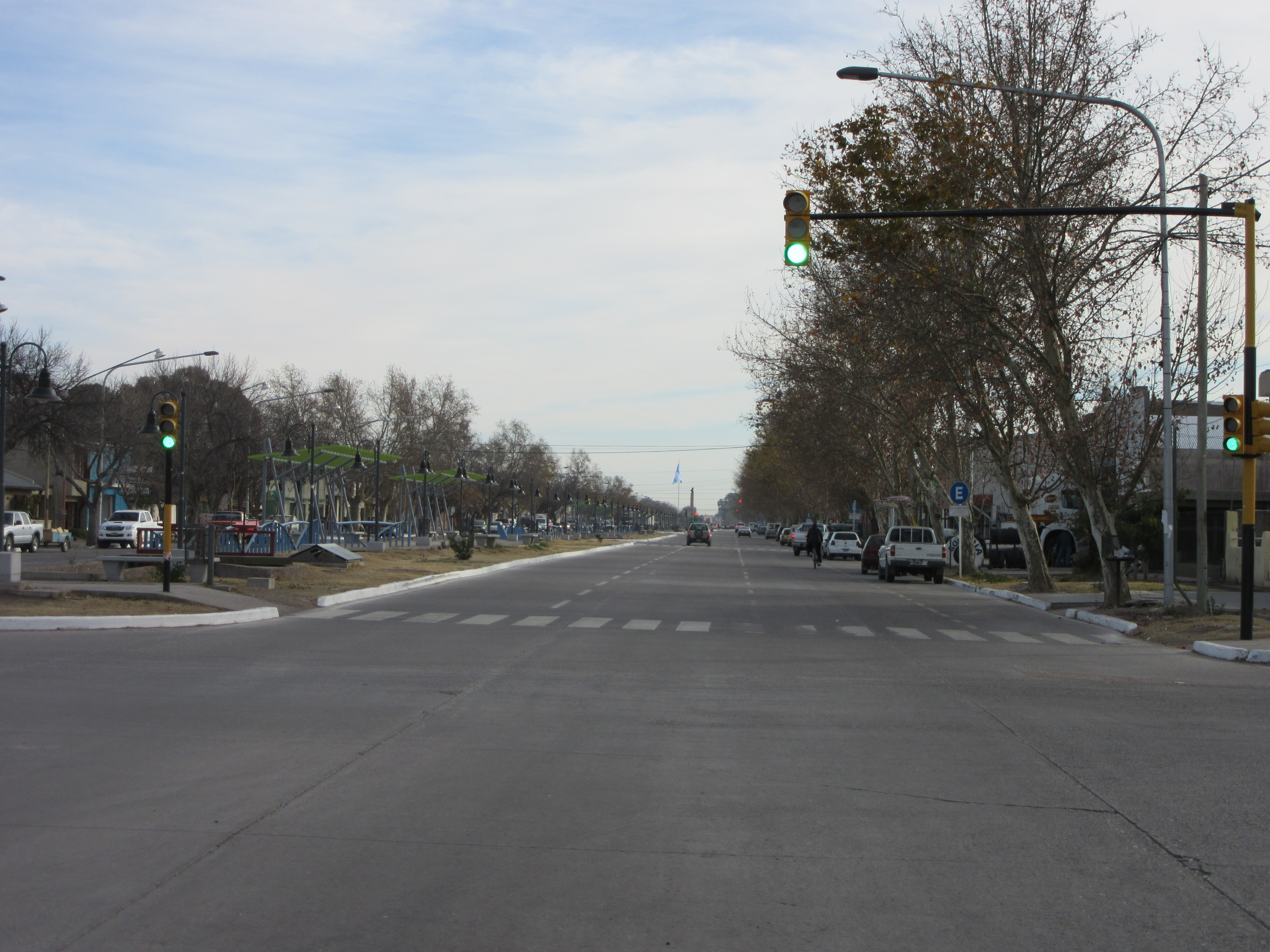

- Location of General Alvear in Argentina
- Coordinates: 34°58′S 67°42′W
- Country: Argentina
- Province: Mendoza
- Department: General Alvear
- Founded: August 12, 1914
- Elevation: 468 m (1,535 ft)

Population (2010 census)
  - Total: 29,909
- Demonym: Alvearense
- Time zone: UTC−3 (ART)
- CPA base: M5620
- Dialing code: +54 2625
- Climate: BWk
- Website: alvearmendoza.gob.ar

General Alvear is the head city of the General Alvear Department, Mendoza in Mendoza Province, Argentina.

Founded on August 12, 1914, it currently has a population of 29,909 (2010 census [INDEC]), and its UN/LOCODE is ARGVA.

It should not be confused with the General Alvear in Buenos Aires Province.

== Name ==
The city is named after General Carlos María de Alvear (1789-1852)

== Notable people ==
- Evelia Edith Oyhenart (1955-2021), anthropologist
