= Alvear, Corrientes =

Alvear Alveár
- Town
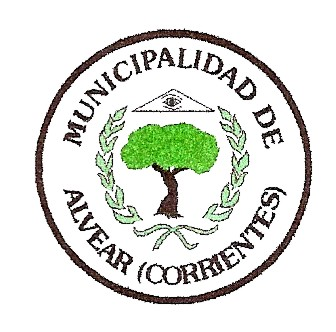
- Coat of arms

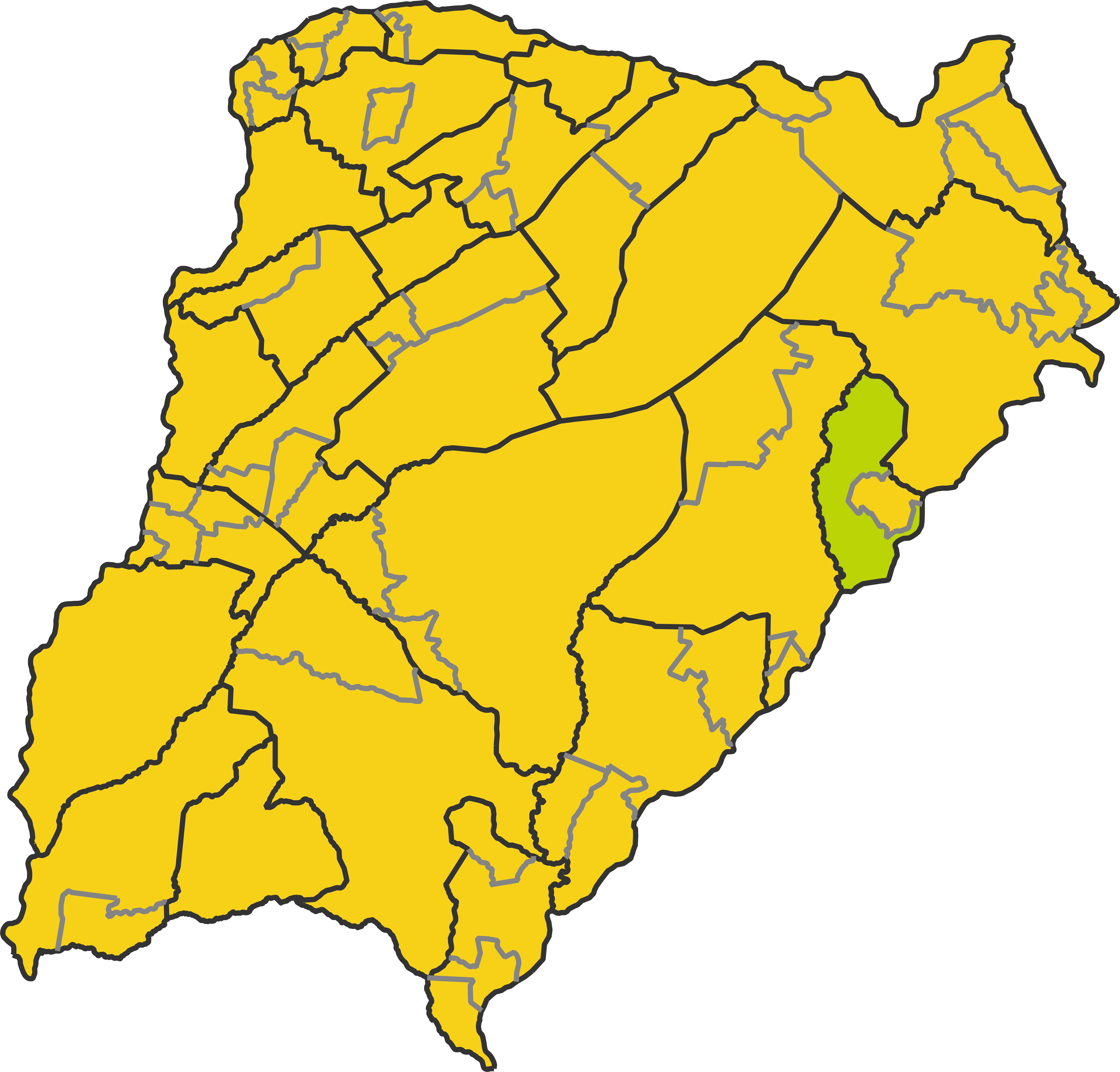
- Location of Alvear in Corrientes Province

- Location of Alvear in Argentina
- Coordinates: 29°03′S 56°32′W
- Country: Argentina
- Province: Corrientes
- Department: General Alvear
- Elevation: 48 m (157 ft)

Population
  - Total: 7,917
- Demonym: Alvearense
- Time zone: UTC−3 (ART)
- CPA base: W3344
- Dialing code: +54 3772

Alvear (Guarani: Alveár) is a town in Corrientes Province, Argentina. It is the capital of the General Alvear Department. It is located at the mouth of the Aguapey River, along the Uruguay River, which separates it from the Brazilian city of Itaqui, with which is closely related. It is accessed via the RN 14 or the General Urquiza railway. It is located roughly 800 km north of Buenos Aires, 250 km south of Posadas and 440 km from Corrientes. According to the 2001 population census conducted by INDEC its population was 7917 inhabitants.

== Etymology ==
The town was officially founded in 1863, in the shadow of the "Ombú Protector", a tree that is immortalized in the community coat of arms. The name is believed to derive from General Carlos de Alvear, who was born in the province of Corrientes and was honored by the members of Congress by naming the fledgling town Alvear after him. It is also said that Don Diego de Alvear, father of Carlos María, lived some years in the Itaqui pass, and that this also contributed to the imposition of the name.

== Notable institutions ==
- Municipalidad de Alvear, the main institution of the city and is located at Centenario 565, off the main square, Plaza 9 de julio.
- Parroquia Inmaculada Concepción, spiritual center of Catholics in the city. Its first building was completed in the late nineteenth century. It takes its name from the image of the Virgin.
- Radio Club Aguapey (LU5LA), the only club in the Uruguay coast of the province
- Biblioteca Popular Carlos María de Alvear, library which attracts crowds of students interested in reading about the history the city. It is located in the main square.
- Hospital Dr. Miguel Sussini, hospital
- TVM TV Mercosur, television station

Also of note are the four schools of samba, 'Pilmayken, Yasí Berá, Halcones For Ever and Itá Berá.'
