= De Alvear =

de Alvear is a surname. Notable people with the surname include

- Carlos María de Alvear (1789–1852), Argentine soldier and statesman
- Diego de Alvear y Ponce de León (1749–1830), Spanish military commander
- Helga de Alvear (1936–2025), German-Spanish art collector and dealer
- Marcelo Torcuato de Alvear (1868–1942), President of Argentina from 1922 to 1928
- Maria de Alvear (born 1960), Spanish-German composer living in Germany
- Torcuato de Alvear (1822–1890), Argentine conservative politician
