= General Alvear, Buenos Aires =

General Alvear
- City
- Location in Argentina
- Coordinates: 36°02′S 60°01′W
- Country: Argentina
- Province: Buenos Aires
- Partido: General Alvear
- Founded: 1853

Population (2010 census [INDEC])
  - Total: 9,812
- CPA Base: B 7263
- Area code: +54 2344

General Alvear is a city in General Alvear Partido in Buenos Aires Province.

The settlement was founded in 1853 as Fortín Esperanza, later Pueblo Esperanza and on July 19, 1869 it was renamed after General Carlos María de Alvear (1789-1852) who fought for the liberation of Argentina during the War of Independence. The city is growing faster than any other city in Buenos Aires Province, because one of the biggest prisons in the Province was built in General Alvear in 2000.

Located 200 km from Buenos Aires, General Alvear is currently a fertile agricultural area known mainly because of the agro activity and cattle. General Alvear Administrative Area is bordered by Tapalque to the northwest; Bolivar to the north; 25 de Mayo to the west; Saladillo to the east; Las Flores to the west.
