= General Alvear Department, Mendoza =

General Alvear Departamento General Alvear
- Department
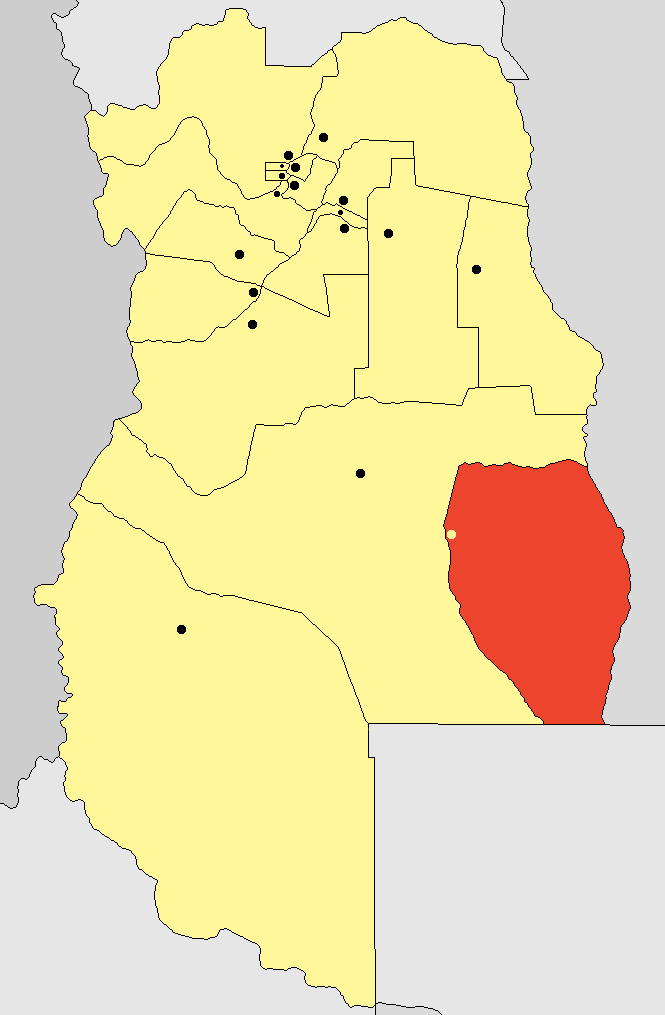
- location of Departamento General Alvear in Mendoza Province
- Coordinates: 34°58′S 67°42′W
- Country: Argentina
- Established: August 12, 1912
- Founder: ?
- Seat: General Alvear

Government
  - Intendant: Alejandro Molero, UCR

Area
  - Total: 14,448 km^{2} (5,578 sq mi)

Population (2022 census [INDEC])
  - Total: 52,584
  - Density: 3.6395/km^{2} (9.4264/sq mi)
- Demonym: alvearense
- Postal Code: M5620
- IFAM: MZA001
- Area Code: 02625
- Patron saint: San José Obrero
- Website: web.archive.org/web/20061103155648/http://www.generalalvearmza.gov.ar/

General Alvear is a department located in the south east of Mendoza Province in Argentina.

The provincial subdivision has a population of about 44,000 inhabitants in an area of 14,448 km^{2} (5,578 sq mi), and its capital city is General Alvear, which is located around 900 km (560 mi) from Buenos Aires.

The City of general Alvear is home to a campus of Universidad Nacional de Cuyo.

The partido and its agricultural lands are irrigated by the Rivers Diamante and Atuel.

== Name ==
The department and its head town are named after General Carlos María de Alvear (1789-1852) a hero of the Argentine War of Independence.

== History ==
- 1879, The land now forming Departamento General Alvear is conquered in the 2nd desert campaign.
- 1884, The lands are purchased by Diego de Alvear, son of General Carlos María de Alvear.
- 1912, The Departamento was officially created on August 12 and the Sarmiento Railroad arrived in the city of General Alvear.

== Districts ==
- Bowen
- General Alvear
- San Pedro del Atuel

== Smaller settlements ==
- Canalejas
- Carmensa
- Cochicó
- Colonia Alvear Oeste
- Corral de Lorca
- El Ceibo
- El Juncalito
- La Escandinava
- La Mora
- Línea de Poste
- Los Compartos
- Ovejería
- Poste de Hierro
