= General Alvear Department, Corrientes =

General Alvear Department Departamento General Alvear (Spanish) Tetãvore Generál Alveár (Guarani)
- Department
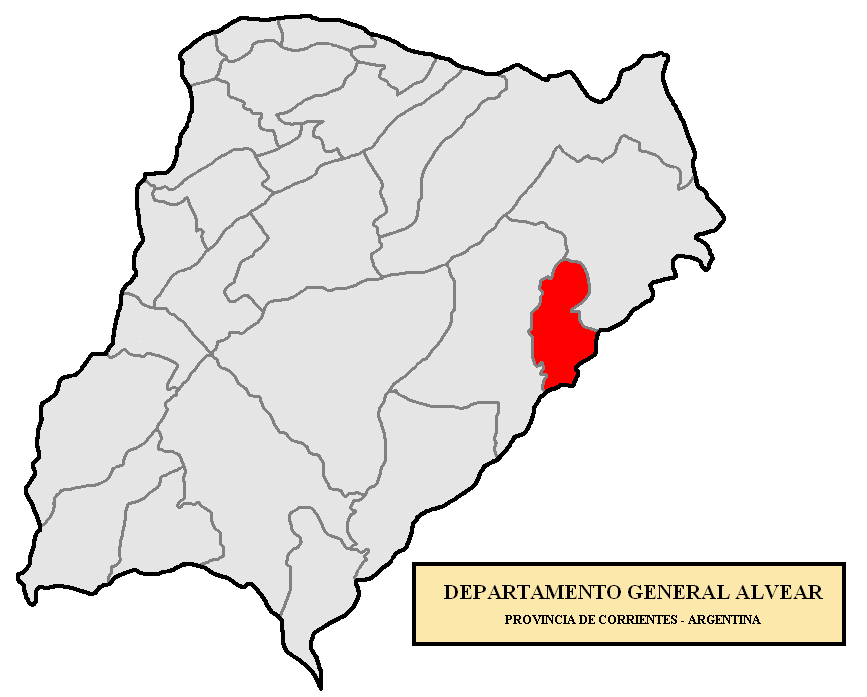
- location of General Alvear Department in Corrientes Province
- Coordinates: 29°03′S 56°32′W
- Country: Argentina
- Seat: Alvear

Area
  - Total: 1,954 km^{2} (754 sq mi)

Population (2001 census [INDEC])
  - Total: 8,147
  - Density: 4.169/km^{2} (10.80/sq mi)
- Demonym: Alvearense
- Postal Code: W3344
- Area Code: 03772

General Alvear Department is a department of Corrientes Province in Argentina.

The provincial subdivision has a population of about 8,147 inhabitants in an area of 1,954 km^{2} (754 sq mi), and its capital city is Alvear, which is located around 835 km (519 mi) from Buenos Aires.

== Settlements ==
- Alvear
- Estación Torrent
