= General Alvear Partido =

General Alvear Partido de General Alvear
- Department
- location of General Alvear Partido in Buenos Aires Province
- Coordinates: 36°02′S 60°01′W
- Country: Argentina
- Established: 22 July 1869
- Named for: Carlos María de Alvear
- Seat: General Alvear

Government
  - Intendant: Ramón Capra (UCR)

Area
  - Total: 3,427 km^{2} (1,323 sq mi)

Population
  - Total: 14,897
  - Density: 4.347/km^{2} (11.26/sq mi)
- Demonym: alvearense
- Postal Code: B7263
- IFAM: BUE043
- Area Code: 02344
- Website: munialvear.gov.ar

General Alvear Partido is a partido (administrative subdivision) in Buenos Aires Province in Argentina.

In the centre of Buenos Aires province, General Alvear Partido has a population of about 15,000 inhabitants in an area of 3,427 km^{2} (1,323 sq mi), and its capital city is General Alvear. The partido is 220 km (140 mi) from the city of Buenos Aires, the capital city of Argentina.

The partido and capital are named after the 19th-century Argentinian soldier and statesman Carlos María de Alvear.

== Towns ==
- General Alvear (capital)
- El Chumbeao
- El Parche
- El Tabaré
- Emma
- Los Gatos
- Jose Maria Micheo
- Santa Isabel
- Lafuente
