= Román González (boxer) =

Nicaraguan boxer (born 1987)

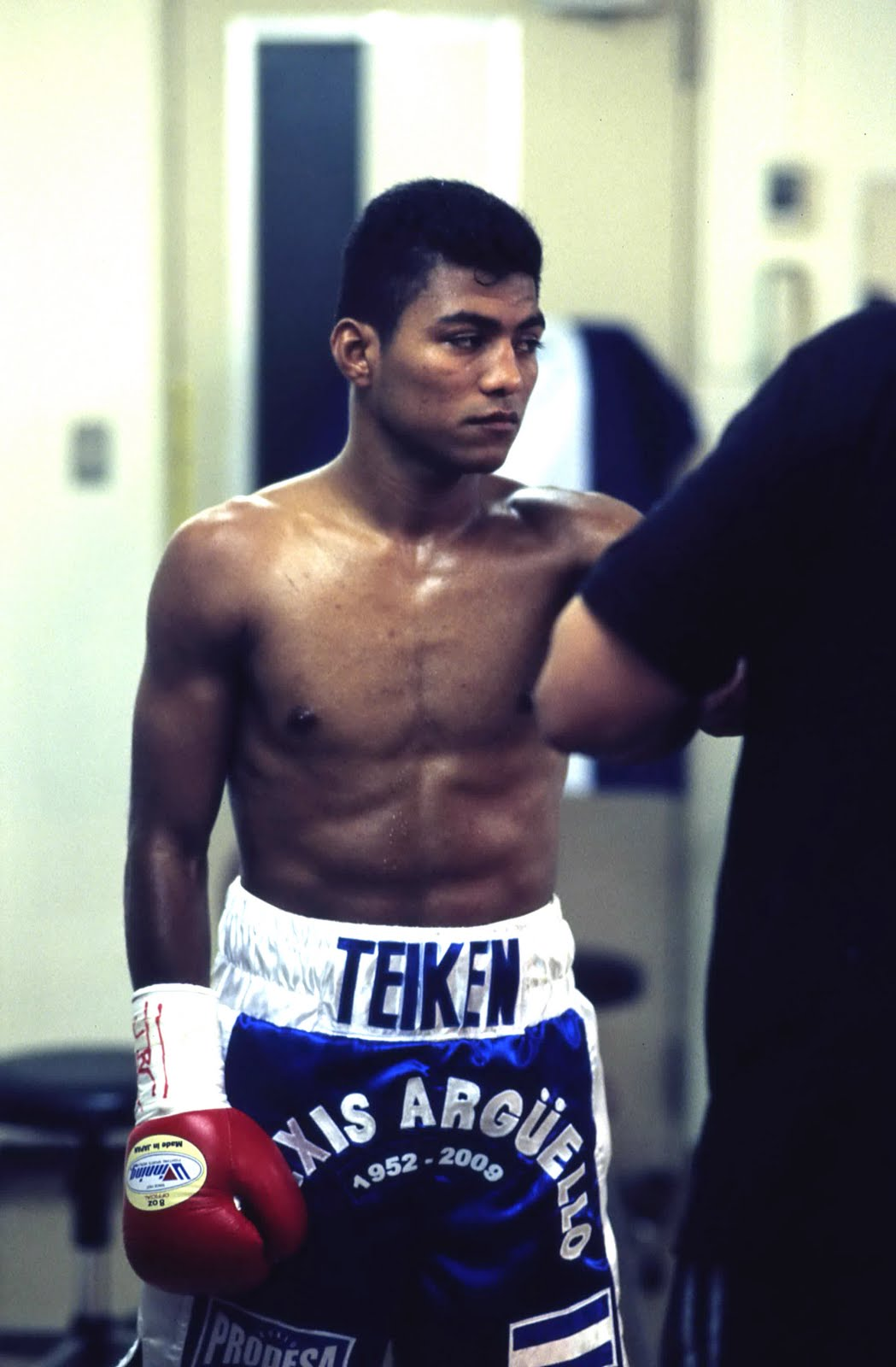
- González in 2014

Personal information
- Nickname: Chocolatito
- Born: Román Alberto González Luna; 17 June 1987 (age 39) Managua, Nicaragua
- Height: 5 ft 3 in (160 cm)
- Weight: Mini flyweight; Light flyweight; Flyweight; Super flyweight; Bantamweight

Boxing career
- Reach: 64 in (163 cm)
- Stance: Orthodox

Boxing record
- Total fights: 56
- Wins: 52
- Win by KO: 42
- Losses: 4

Román Alberto González Luna (born 17 June 1987) is a Nicaraguan professional boxer. He is the first boxer from Nicaragua to win world titles in four weight classes, having surpassed his mentor, idol, and former three-weight world champion Alexis Argüello.

He has held the WBA minimumweight title from 2008 to 2010; the WBA light flyweight title from 2011 to 2013; the WBC, and The Ring flyweight titles from 2014 to 2016, WBC super flyweight title from 2016 to 2017; and the WBA (Super) super flyweight title from 2020 to 2021. From September 2015 to March 2017, he was also ranked by The Ring and ESPN as the world's best active boxer, pound for pound. He is known particularly for his aggressive pressure fighting style and combination punching.

== Early life ==
González was raised in Barrio La Esperanza, a disadvantaged suburb characterized by high crime rates and frequent flooding, along with inadequate sanitation facilities. His upbringing necessitated a "law of the jungle" mentality for survival, as indicated by González. This environment compelled him to develop a resilient and tough disposition early in life, enabling him to navigate the various challenges presented by his neighbourhood and daily existence.

His family experienced significant economic difficulties; his father intermittently earned a living by selling cleaning supplies and insecticides door-to-door, with young a Román often accompanying him on these sales trips within their community. These early experiences provided him with a first-hand understanding of poverty and fostered a determination to succeed and improve his family's circumstances.

Boxing constituted an integral aspect of his family's heritage, as his father was a former boxer, which sparked his initial interest in the sport. With limited financial means available, his first "boxing gloves" were essentially rubber gloves, and he trained by striking a makeshift sand-filled milk sack suspended from a tree in his backyard. His early dedication and discipline were apparent, showcasing his steadfast commitment despite the lack of resources.

González frequently noted that his challenging upbringing and the drive to support his family were pivotal to his emergence as one of Nicaragua's preeminent boxers, allowing him to surmount generational obstacles. This early life experience significantly influenced his aggressive, technically proficient boxing style, as well as his mental resilience both inside and outside of the boxing ring, ultimately contributing to his status as Nicaragua's first four-division world boxing champion and an internationally recognized pound-for-pound star.

== Amateur career ==
González was reportedly undefeated as an amateur, amassing an 88–0 record in official amateur bouts. The highlight of his amateur career was winning the light flyweight gold medal at the 2004 Central American Championships.

== Professional career ==
=== Light flyweight ===
Dubbed "Chocolatito", an 18 year old González turned professional as a light flyweight in 2005. In his debut, he fought at the Pharaohs Casino in Managua, Nicaragua against 23 year old Ramon Urbina (0–1, 0 KOs) in a scheduled 4 round fight. González won via knockout in round 2. In his 9th professional fight, González fought Oscar Murillo (11–10, 8 KOs) for the vacant Nicaraguan and WBA Fedecentro light flyweight titles. González won via a 1st-round knockout. In his next fight, González would also win the WBA Fedelatin minimumweight title against José Luis Varela, after which he returned to light flyweight. González won his first 16 fights all by way of knockout, before meeting Hiroshi Matsumoto (17–7–4, 8 KOs) at the Bunka Gym in Yokohama on 14 January 2008. The fight went the full 10 rounds as González picked up the win via unanimous decision (100–90, 100–90 98–92) in his first fight outside his native Nicaragua.

=== Minimumweight ===
==== González vs. Niida ====
On 15 September 2008, González fought the WBA world minimumweight champion Yutaka Niida (23–1–3, 9 KOs) in Yokohama, Japan in what was only his second fight in the minimumweight division. González scored a technical knockout with 58 seconds left in the fourth round to win the title. He was ahead 30–27 on all the scorecards at the time of stoppage.

After winning the WBA title, González made his debut at flyweight on 13 December 2008, stopping Miguel Tellez (18–11, 6 KOs) in the third round.

==== Subsequent defenses ====
He went back to minimumweight on 28 February 2009 to defend his world crown against Francisco Rosas (20–5–2, 12 KOs) which he won by majority decision (116–112, 115–113 & 114–114). This was González's first time fighting in Mexico.

In July 2009, González defended his belt at the World Memorial Hall in Japan against Katsunari Takayama (23–3, 9 KOs). After 12 rounds, the three judges all scored it 118–110 for González. According to CompuBox, González landed 594 punches, the second-highest total ever recorded in a world championship bout.

In January 2010, González defended his title against Ivan Meneses (14–5–1, 8 KOs). Meneses was knocked down in the third round, before the fight was stopped in the next round.

=== Return to light flyweight ===
González vacated his minimumweight title after 3 successful defenses, moving back to light flyweight. On his first fight in his new weight class, he defeated Jesus Limones (10–1–1, 4 KOs) via 2nd-round TKO in September 2010.

==== González vs. Rosas II ====
A 23-year-old González won the vacant WBA interim light flyweight title against Francisco Rosas (21–7–2, 12 KOs) in Tokyo on 24 October 2010. This was the second time they fought, having previously fought in the minimumweight division. González won by KO in the second round. Rosas was knocked down three times in this fight. After his first fight against Francisco Rosas, González said that he fought while being ill with severe stomach disorders, and that was the reason why he looked so sluggish and tired. González was promoted to full champion in February 2011 after Juan Carlos Reveco resigned as light flyweight champion to pursue a flyweight title.

On 22 February 2011 it was announced that González would make his first defence against former champion Manuel Vargas (30–7–1, 15 KOs) on 19 March in Mexico. González was victorious over Vargas via unanimous decision (119–109, 116–112, 116–112) It was announced that González would return to fight in Mexico in July. In June, it was announced that González would fight 31 year old Omar Salado (22–3–2, 13 KOs) on 9 July. González dropped Salado en route to a stoppage win in round 7.

==== González vs. Soto ====
González's third defense took place at the Marquee Ballroom in MGM Grand Hotel and Casino in Las Vegas, Nevada, on 1 October 2011. In his first fight in the United States, González knocked out Omar Soto (22–7–2, 15 KOs) with a straight right and left uppercut combination 36 seconds into the 2nd round. The title was only on the line for González, as Soto weighed in considerably above the weight limit, at 111 lbs.

On 17 March 2012 González faced Manuel Jimenez (11–2–1, 5 KOs) at Sinaloa, Mexico, defeating Jimenez via 1st-round KO. This was a non-title fight. The original opponent to fight González was former IBF champion Ramon Garcia Hirales (16–3–1, 9 KOs), who initially replaced his twin brother Raúl García.

==== González vs. Garcia, Estrada ====
On 28 April 2012 González defended his WBA light flyweight title against Ramon Garcia Hirales at the Fairplex in Pomona, California. The fight ended as the count was waived by referee Raul Caiz Jr, after Garcia was knocked down twice in the 4th round. González was ahead 30–27 on all scorecards at the time of stoppage.

González briefly moved up to Flyweight on 6 October 2012 and fought undefeated 23-year-old Stiven Monterrosa (9–0–2, 8 KOs) at the Hotel Holiday Inn in Managua, Nicaragua. Monterrosa was knocked down in rounds 1 and 2. The stoppage seemed questionable as the referee waved the fight off as González was finishing off his combination and landed a punch which didn't appear to hurt Monterrosa. Monterrosa questioned the officials as to why the fight was stopped.

On 27 October 2012 it was announced that González would fight 22 year old flyweight prospect Juan Francisco Estrada (26–1, 20 KOs) at Los Angeles Memorial Sports Arena on 17 November. In an entertaining bout, González retained his title via unanimous decision. This was the second time González fought in California and the third time in the United States. The judges scored it (118–110, 116–112, 116–112) all in favour of González.

On 25 May 2013 González fought Colombian Ronald Barrera (30–11–2, 18 KOs) in a non-title bout at super flyweight at the Polideportivo España, Managua, Nicaragua. González won the fight via fifth-round stoppage. Referee Onofre Ramirez stopped the fight after Barrera was knocked down 2 minutes 42 seconds into the round. The fight was originally scheduled for 113 pounds, but both boxers weighed 116 pounds. This led many to question if González would be able to cut back down to 108 pounds.

=== Flyweight ===
After 5 successful title defenses at light flyweight, vacated his title to move up to flyweight. On 21 September 2013 he defeated Francisco Rodríguez, Jr. by TKO in the 7th round. He then defeated Oscar Blanquet, Juan Kantun and Philippine Juan Purisima, all by TKO. With this string of fights, González took his professional record to 39–0, with 33 wins coming by way of knockout.

==== González vs. Yaegashi ====
On 23 June 2014 it was finally confirmed that González would challenge the WBC, The Ring and lineal flyweight champion Akira Yaegashi (20–3, 10 KOs) on 5 September 2014 at the Yoyogi #2 Gymnasium in Tokyo, Japan. González won the fight via ninth-round TKO to win the WBC, The Ring and lineal flyweight titles, becoming a boxing triple champion. Yaegashi was knocked down in rounds 3 and 9. Referee Michael Griffin stopped the fight after a final uppercut to Yaegashi. At the time of stoppage the three judges had the fight (80–71 & 79–72 twice) in favour of González.

==== González vs. Fuentes, Sosa ====
On 19 October 2014 Teiken Boxing Gym announced that González would make a defence of his titles against Rocky Fuentes (35–7–2, 20 KOs) on 22 November at the International Swimming Pool in Yokohama, Japan. The fight was being discussed for over a month. González retained the titles against Fuentes via sixth-round TKO. González fought Valentin Leon in a non-title bout on 28 February 2015, winning via a 3rd-round TKO.

On 24 March 2015 it was announced that González would be making his HBO debut against Mexican boxer Édgar Sosa (51–8, 30 KOs) at The Forum in Inglewood, California, on HBO World Championship Boxing on the Golovkin vs. Monroe undercard on 16 May. González defeated Sosa via a 2nd-round TKO. Sosa was down 3 times in round 2. Sosa made no effort to try to get up after the third knockdown. González earned a career high $200,000 against Sosa. After defeating Sosa, González called for a rematch against Estrada.

==== González vs. Viloria ====
It was announced that González would defend his world titles against 34 year old former unified flyweight champion Brian Viloria (36–4, 22 KOs) at Madison Square Garden in New York City on 17 October 2015 on the undercard of the middleweight unification bout between Gennady Golovkin and David Lemieux. González defeated Viloria via a 9th-round TKO to retain his World titles. Viloria was knocked down in the 3rd round with a short right-hand from González. In round 9, González landed a wide-open right hand that snapped Viloria's head to the side. With Viloria having taken a beating, referee Benjy Esteves Jr. stepped in and stopped the fight at 2 minutes, 52 seconds. According to CompuBox, González landed 335 of 805 punches (42 percent), and Viloria was limited to landing only 186 of 594 (31 percent). González was ahead on all 3 judges scorecards (78–73 twice, 79–72) before the knockdown. With the win, González moved to 14–0 in world title bouts. González earned a $250,000 purse.

==== González vs. Arroyo ====
On 13 February 2016 it was announced that González would defend his titles against McWilliams Arroyo (16–2, 14 KOs) on 23 April 2016 at The Forum in Inglewood, California on a co-feature of World Middleweight title bout between Gennady Golovkin and Dominic Wade. This was the third consecutive time González co-featured on a Golovkin card. González won via unanimous decision (120–108, 120–108, 119–109) ending his ten-fight stoppage streak. Dan Rafael from ESPN scored the fight a shutout (120–108) for González. On fight night, González weighed in at 126 pounds and said he could make one more defence before moving up to super flyweight, "My conditioning was fantastic. Training in Costa Rica made all the difference [...] I think maybe one more fight at 112 and then I move up to 115. I want to fight the best possible opponent."

González landed 360 of 1,132 (32%) total punches while Arroyo landed 193 of 711 (27%) of his total punches. González earned a then career high $300,000 purse for this fight. According to the Nielsen ratings, the fight averaged 1.001 million viewers and peaked at 1.14 million.

=== Super flyweight ===
==== González vs. Cuadras ====
K2 Promotions announced on 14 July that González will move up to super flyweight to challenge Carlos Cuadras (35–0–1, 27 KOs) for his WBC title. The bout took place on 10 September 2016 at The Forum in Inglewood. The fight was part of a HBO split-site telecast on which K2 stablemate and unified middleweight titleholder Gennady Golovkin defeated welterweight titlist Kell Brook at the O2 Arena in London. That night, HBO had live coverage of Cuadras-González along with a replay of Golovkin-Brook.

In a close fight, González defeated Cuadras via 12 round unanimous decision to become the WBC super flyweight champion. This was the first time González headlined a card and drew a crowd of 6,714, which was considered a success. The three judges scored the bout 117–111, 116–112 and 115–113, all in favour of González. Combined, both fighters threw over 1,000 punches, with González getting the better of Cuadras. González was guaranteed a $400,000 purse for the fight, his highest ever. The fight averaged 843,000 viewers on HBO. In attendance and at ringside for that fight was WBO super flyweight champion Naoya Inoue. Shortly after González's win over Cuadras, representatives of Inoue sent a formal offer to González for what would've been a unification showdown. González stipulated that the terms offered for an Inoue fight weren't good enough, and turned down the contract.

After the win, González made history by becoming the first fighter in the history of Nicaragua to capture four titles in four weight divisions, something his mentor Alexis Argüello failed to do twice during his career.

After 4 successful flyweight title defenses, González vacated his WBC Flyweight title. He would be keeping the WBC super flyweight title and continue fighting in the 115 lbs division.

==== Death of Arnulfo Obando ====
On 8 November 2016, González's trainer since 2010, Arnulfo Obando, was hospitalized after suffering a stroke earlier that week and in a serious condition. Upon arriving at the hospital, he was declared brain dead. On 11 November, the WBC president Mauricio Sulaiman confirmed in a statement that Obando had died at the age of 53. It was also said that González would take a break from boxing. On 24 January 2017 González started the training camp for his upcoming fight and announced that his father, Luis González would be his head trainer.

==== González vs. Sor Rungvisai ====
In December 2016, at the 54th WBC Convention, president Mauricio Sulaiman announced that a rematch would take place between González and Cuadras for the WBC title in March 2017. The winner of the rematch will need to fight WBC #2 mandatory and WBC silver champion Srisaket Sor Rungvisai (41–4–1, 38 KOs). González stated he hadn't agreed to a rematch or signed any contracts for a rematch to take place as he was not obligated to do so. González also spoke about the purse offered to him for a rematch, "The HBO people are offering me very low money, so I can not accept that fight. I've been struggling to get a good purse, because we are the world's number one pound for pound." It was reported that González was looking for a purse of around $1 million.

On 5 January González's manager Carlos Blandon said that an opponent would be announced in ten days. A day later, due to González not being obliged to give Cuadras a rematch, Sulaimán stated that Sor Rungvisai will get a chance to fight González next. The fight was officially announced on 7 January and served as the co-feature for Gennady Golovkin vs. Daniel Jacobs at Madison Square Garden on 18 March 2017. Coming into the fight Rungvisai had only one loss since 2010, which came to Cuadras in 2014 via technical decision.

On fight night, González was knocked down in the first round by a body shot and went on to lose his first professional fight as well as the WBC super flyweight title via majority decision. Waleska Roldan scored the fight 113–113 even, whilst Glenn Feldman and Julie Lederman both scored it 114–112 in favor of Sor Rungvisai. ESPN scored the bout wide 117–109 in favor of González. Many boos were heard around the arena filled with 19,939 following the announcement of the decision. In round 3, González suffered a cut over his right eye, via an accidental clash of heads. The cut was treated by his corner throughout the fight, but blood still flowed on the side of his face. Sor Rungvisai lost a point in round 6 due to another clash of heads. After the fight, González stated "I thought I won the fight. I want an immediate rematch. I want to get my title back." Compubox stats showed González landed 441 of his 1,013 thrown (44%), while Sor Rungvisai landed 284 of 940 (30%). González out-landed Sor Rungvisai in 10 rounds out of 12. He also set a super flyweight record for power shots landed with 372. González earned a career high purse $500,000 whilst Rungvisai earned $75,000.

==== González vs. Sor Rungvisai II ====
K2 director Tom Loeffler stated on 31 March that González would seek a rematch with Sor Rungvisai. On 4 April 2017 the WBC ordered a direct rematch to take place between González and Sor Rungvisai. The winner of the first fight was due to fight mandatory challenger Carlos Cuadras. However, due to the direct rematch, the WBC ordered Cuadras to fight the next available contender, former unified flyweight champion Juan Francisco Estrada for the WBC interim title. The winner of both fights would then proceed to fight each other. WBC rationalized this with the following statement,

“Rules regarding accidental head butts were not used, but most importantly, considering the public demand to witness once again a great match between these two great fighters, the WBC has granted the request.”

Loeffler confirmed a date in the fall of 2017 would be considered and a venue will be discussed with representatives of Rungvisai. On 6 June Loeffler said the rematch would take place on 9 September on HBO at a location in California. It was said the Japanese super flyweight Naoya Inoue would be in line to make his American TV debut on the same card. On 7 June González travelled to Japan to negotiate a deal with Teiken Promotions for the fight. One of the main reasons for discussing the contract, was his purse. It was revealed by Mexican promoter Osvaldo Küchle, that Cuadras and Estrada would fight on the undercard for the WBC interim title. On 6 July Tom Loeffler announced the fight would take place at the StubHub Center in Carson, California. The event also features WBO champion Naoya Inoue and it was verbally agreed that should González win against Rungvisai, then he and Inoue will meet in a unification bout. It was confirmed the fight would be shown live on Sky Sports in the United Kingdom.

At the 7-day weigh in on 3 September González weighed 119.8 lbs and Rungvisai weighed in at 119 lbs. Per WBC rules, both boxers were required to weigh no more than 121 lbs. At the official weigh-in one day before the fight, González tipped the scales at 114.8 lbs, while Sor Rungvisai weighed 115 lbs. González would be paid a career high $600,000 purse, while Sor Rungvisai would make $170,000.

On fight night, in front of a pro-González sell-out crowd of 7,418, González suffered his second consecutive career defeat and failed to regain the WBC title, after being knocked out by Sor Rungvisai in the fourth round of their rematch. The opening round started with both fighters throwing heavy shots. Sor Rungvisai began to work the body straight away. In round 4, González was knocked down hard from a left to the head. González beat the count getting up at 7, but on unsteady legs. Rungvisai then finished the badly hurt González with a right to the head that put him down flat on his back. Referee Tom Taylor didn't bother with a count, waiving the fight off at 1:18 of the round. González was taken to the hospital after the fight for precaution. Like the first fight, an accidental headbutt occurred in round 1, when González complained and the crowd booed, the referee warned Rungvisai. The fight averaged an audience of 796,000 viewers on HBO and peaked at 835,000 viewers.

After the fight, Srisaket Sor Rungvisai stated that he had prepared for four months in order to knock González out, "I trained very hard for four months. I fought for Thailand, and this is what I dedicate this fight to, Thailand. For the first fight I only trained for two months. I knew I was going to knock him out." González was humble in defeat, "We were both trading punches, but his were harder, and they landed harder. I was very hurt the second time when I was knocked down, but I think I'll be OK." Promoter Tom Loeffler also spoke to HBO in regards to González's future, "I don't think he's done. When you fight a guy like Srisaket, he took the opportunity of winning the lottery. He beat the No. 1 pound-for-pound fighter and beat him in New York, and then he beat him more convincingly the second time. Now he has to be considered one of the best in the world. You saw Roman really packed the house, and Srisaket came into a hostile environment and proved he is a true champion. He has tremendous punching power." CompuBox stats showed that Rungvisai landed 80 of his 291 punches thrown (27%) and González landed 58 of 212 (27%). All 80 of Rungvisai's landed punches were power shots. González stated that he wouldn't return to the flyweight division, as he was unable to reach the 112 lbs limit and that he was interested in competing for a fifth world title, but he was also considering retirement.

At that moment, any future talk of a fight between Inoue and González was dead in the water.

==== Inactivity ====
Weeks after the fight, González stated that he was planning to continue his career. Teiken Promotions was said to be looking to arrange a fight against WBA champion Kal Yafai. Yafai replied to reports that González wanted to fight him by replying, "Happy days, I’ve wanted González for a long time," although he would have to get past his mandatory fight first. González spoke out regarding challenging Yafai after being ranked # 2 by the WBA, "It is a blessing to know that the WBA has placed me at number 2 in the rankings. I am grateful to [WBA President] Gilberto Mendoza for this opportunity." González wished to take up an interim fight, before challenging for a world title. He said, "I am never going to [enter the Yafai] fight in bad condition. I take good care of myself, that's why I think I need a preparation fight." After being trained by Japanese coach Sendai Tanaka in his last fight, González made his intentions clear that he wanted to work with Félix Trinidad's father and ex trainer Don Felix. Fellow countryman and former two-weight world champion Rosendo Álvarez advised González to return to flyweight, stating it would be too much for him to remain at super flyweight and even more dangerous to move up to bantamweight. According to Tom Loeffler on 22 November it was believed that González would make his ring return around April or May 2018, possibly on the undercard of a Gennady Golvokin fight. Loeffler also stated that González would not be part of the planned SuperFly 2 card.

On 11 January 2018 González hired Gustavo Herrera as his head trainer, from Managua, Nicaragua at the Roger Deshon gym and stated his intention to remain at super flyweight. On 8 April veteran Mexican boxer Pedro Guevara (30–3–1, 17 KOs) was being lined up to be González's next opponent, likely for Golovkin's undercard on 5 May 2018. Terms had been agreed for a 10-round super flyweight fight between both parties, however the fight had not been announced until the date and venue was confirmed. After Golovkin vs. Martirosyan was announced for 5 May at the StubHub Center in Carson, promoter Loeffler confirmed that González would appear on the undercard. On 24 April González released a statement saying he would not fight on 5 May after an opponent was not officially confirmed. He went on to state that he would likely return in June 2018 in Nicaragua, where he last fought in 2015. According to González's manager, Carlos Blandon, González was unable to get a VISA. Three scheduled appointments in the space on 30 days had been cancelled. Blandon stated they were still waiting on the VISA issue as González wanted a camp outside of Nicaragua. He also stated González would likely return in September 2018. On 30 May 2018 it was reported the California State Athletic Commission required González to pass new neurological examinations before the ban would be lifted. González initially passed the exams after his knockout loss to Rungvisai in September 2017. The reason for the additional tests would be for precautionary measure.

==== González vs. Fuentes, Diocos ====
According to ElNuevoDiario on 13 July 2018 González was looking for an opponent for the undercard of the Canelo Álvarez vs. Gennady Golovkin rematch on 15 September at the T-Mobile Arena in Paradise, Nevada. At the time, the two likely opponents were Pedro Guevara and former world minimumweight champion Moisés Fuentes (25–5–1, 14 KOs). On 20 August it was announced that González would fight Fuentes in a 10-round bout to open the PPV telecast. González returned to winning ways after he knocked out Fuentes in round 5. Fuentes was well beaten and bloody at the time referee Robert Byrd halted the fight, at 1 minute, 44 seconds. Fuentes lacked the power to hurt González whenever he did land. González dominated Fuentes with sustained combinations in the same way he had done prior to his two losses. Fuentes suffered a cut over his right eye in round 2, with the dripping blood giving him problems with his visibility. González did not target the eye, instead he mixed up his shots from body to head. There was little action in round 1, as both boxers fought cautiously. González earned $200,000, whilst Fuentes made $35,000 for the bout. CompuBox showed that González landed 145 of 390 punches thrown (37%), while Fuentes landed only 47 of his 244 thrown (19%).

On 31 October it was reported that González would return to the ring on 8 December 2018 on the final televised boxing card on HBO. According to ESPN Deportes, the likely opponent was former world champion Pedro Guevara (32–3–1, 19 KOs) in a 10-round bout. A day later, the fight was announced to take place at the StubHub Center in Carson, California.

On 25 November, Tom Loeffler told ESPN, González was unable to shake off a knee injury he suffered during his training camp and would no longer fight Guevara on the card. González would be out for up to six weeks following an arthroscopic surgery. Loeffler revealed Juan Francisco Estrada would likely replace González and fight Guevara on the same card.

In early December, González underwent successful surgery on his right knee.

González returned to the ring on 23 December 2019 on the undercard of the Ryōta Murata – Steven Butler fight in Yokohama, Japan. His opponent was Diomel Diocos (14–6–3, 4 KOs). González wasted no time and quickly broke down the overmatched Diocos with powerful combinations, staggering him badly in the second round. Referee Yuji Fukuchi stopped the action and gave Diocos a standing eight count for him to collect himself. But as soon as the fight resumed, González continued to land punches on Diocos at free will, prompting the referee to step in and stop the fight thus giving González the victory via second-round stoppage.

==== González vs. Yafai ====
On 14 January 2020, Matchroom Boxing promoter Eddie Hearn announced González would challenge the WBA super-flyweight champion Kal Yafai on 29 February at the Ford Center at The Star in Frisco, Texas. The fight was on the undercard Mikey Garcia vs. Jessie Vargas welterweight main event. Despite having some success in the early rounds, Yafai was unable to fully capitalize on his bigger size and reach advantage, allowing González to get close and dictate the pace of the fight with his relentless pressure and bruising body shots. González' high work rate and body attacks began to take an early toll on the champion who became increasingly slower and fatigued, even losing his mouthpiece several times over the fight. In the seventh round González unloaded on a fatigued Yafai and a sweeping right hand knocked the champion off balance. Yafai finally fell to the canvas late in the eighth round from an accumulation of punches, but he got up to finish the final few seconds of the round on his feet. González quickly ended the fight in the ninth round after landing a huge overhand right that put Yafai on the floor for the second time. Referee Luis Pabon waved off the fight at the 0:29 mark, awarding González the WBA (Regular) title via ninth-round TKO. At the time of the stoppage González was ahead on all three judges' scorecards with 80–71, 77–74 and 78–73. He was later promoted to WBA (Super) champion, and said he plans on fighting the other champions at super flyweight to unify the titles.

==== González vs. González ====
On 26 September 2020, González travelled to Mexico to finalize his training camp. He was preparing for a defence against mandatory challenger and WBA #3 ranked Israel González (25–3, 11 KOs) on 23 October. The card was officially announced a day prior, to take place at TV Azteca Studios in Mexico City. González expressed gratitude to God for the strength to compete in boxing and defend his world title. He also acknowledged Eddie Hearn, Matchroom Boxing, and his family at Teiken for their support. He was committed to giving his best performance and expected a competitive fight. Israel recognized that his boxing intelligence, timing, and distance management would be essential for the fight. He reviewed Díaz's bout with Yafai, observing that Yafai's lack on focus played a significant role in González's success, and he intended to adopt a different strategy in his this fight. González successfully defended his belt, by dominating through most of the fight and earning a unanimous decision victory. González utilized his aggressive fighting style, delivering a high volume of punches throughout the fight, which played a crucial role in securing the win. Israel had moments in the fight where he employed effective jabs and tried to box from the outside. However, he struggled to maintain his pace against the relentless attacks from González, who capitalized on opportunities to land significant body and head shots. The scores read 118–110, 117–111 and 116–112. The main event saw Juan Francisco Estrada defeat Carlos Cuadras via stoppage to set up the long-awaited rematch with González.

==== González vs. Estrada II ====
On 19 December 2020, Eddie Hearn announced that the rematch between González and Estrada would occur on 13 March 2021. He highlighted the importance of the fight, mentioning that both fighters were currently in their prime. While a venue had not been confirmed, Hearn expressed his intention to hold the event in a location accessible to fans. The fight was contested for his WBA and Estrada's WBC and The Ring super flyweight champion. The WBC confirmed the unification fight following the agreement of mandatory contender Srisaket Sor Rungvisai to step aside. In January 2021, the American Airlines Center in Dallas, Texas was announced as the host venue.

González commenced his training at the Roger Deshon gym in Managua before relocating his training camp to Riverside, California. He expressed confidence in his preparedness and anticipated a competitive fight, highlighting the necessity for both fighters to perform at their optimal levels. Estrada's aim was to win the rematch decisively, seeking a knockout rather than a points decision. He was confidence in his preparation and believed he had evolved since their first encounter. Upon hearing this, González chose to maintain silence and concentrate on the fight itself rather than participate in verbal discussions. González was looking to throw more than 1000 punches during the fight. As of 10 March, Texas businesses were permitted to operate at full capacity, and the statewide mask mandate was lifted. However, the event would enforce certain safety protocols. Attendees were required to wear masks, except while eating or drinking. The arena was set up accommodate a maximum of 5,000 attendees. Both weighed an identical 114.8 pounds. Estrada entered fight week with increased confidence, having avenged two of his three professional defeats and aiming to continue this pattern against González.

In a competitive rematch, Estrada secured a victory by split decision, achieving revenge and unifying the WBC and WBA super-flyweight titles in a bout considered one of the year's best. The fight was closely contested and action-packed, with both boxers demonstrating exceptional skill and determination. Estrada established his rhythm from the outset, effectively targeting both the body and head of González. In response, González made impactful counterattacks with powerful right hooks, particularly excelling in the middle rounds, notably the sixth round, as they engaged in an exchange of heavy punches. The championship rounds continued to display high intensity; González landed precise punches at close range, while Estrada countered with accurate combinations to maintain his advantage. The final round featured both fighters fiercely exchanging clean shots, leaving the outcome uncertain. Throughout the 12 rounds, they collectively threw over 2,500 punches, reflecting relentless aggression and endurance. Two judges scored in favor of Estrada with 117-111 and 115–113, while a third judge awarded González a score of 115–113. Estrada expressed confidence in his performance and indicated readiness for a potential third fight with González. However, he was also scheduled to face WBC mandatory challenger Srisaket Sor Rungvisai next. While it was not reported officially, it was believed that Estrada was paid less than a $2.5m purse. González requested a purse of over $1 million to take the rematch.

González maintained an advantage over Estrada in all CompuBox categories on Saturday night, with the exception of body punches, where Estrada led 89–31. The 90 power punches landed in Round 12, comprising 51 by González and 39 by Estrada, established a record for a single round in the junior bantamweight division, according to CompuBox. Estrada successfully landed 314 of 1,212 total punches (26%), while González landed 391 of 1,317 total punches (30%). A total of 2,323 tickets were sold for the event generating a live gate of $227,765.

Though the bout received widespread acclaim, a controversy emerged regarding Carlos Sucre's wide 117-111 scorecard, leading to discussions about the decision's fairness. Carlos Sucre, a veteran boxing judge, has been temporarily suspended by the WBA. President Gilberto J. Mendoza announced the suspension, stating that the Officials Committee would evaluate Sucre's performance in the fight. No permanent or further disciplinary action was publicly announced. Estrada dismissed the notion that a robbery occurred during the contest, asserting that the match was closely contested and could have been awarded to either fighter.

==== González vs. Martínez ====
In May 2021, the possibility of a third fight between González and Estrada was a topic of discussion for September or October, as noted by promoter Eddie Hearn. Negotiations were active involving both fighters' teams, with the intention of conducting the event on the West Coast, thereby targeting a broader audience than that of the previous matches. The trilogy bout was set for 16 October on DAZN, however on 9 September, González withdrew, due to testing positive for COVID. In December, the trilogy fight was once again rescheduled, this time to take place on 5 March 2022 at Pechanga Arena in San Diego. On 25 January 2022, the fight has been postponed again, this time because Estrada had to withdraw after showing symptoms of COVID-19. The fight card was still scheduled to go ahead, with Julio Cesar Martínez (18–1, 14 KOs) moving up in weight to fight González. Martínez expressed a strong desire to ascend in weight class and compete against top fighters in the super-flyweight division. Martínez expressed his genuine excitement about the new chapter, highlighting it as an honor to go up against a legendary fighter like Chocolatito in his super-flyweight debut. He recognized the significance of the fight and assured reporters that he was ready for a tough challenge. Martínez wanted to become the first Mexican to stop González.

Martínez faced some challenges in hitting the 115-pound weight limit, missing it on two occasions. Initially, he weighed in at 117 pounds, and after taking a two-hour break, he stepped back on the scale, showing a weight of 116.4 pounds. As a result, Martínez was subjected to a fine payable to González, who successfully made weight with an initial measurement of 114.7 pounds. This situation placed the scheduled fight at risk, raising concerns about the possibility of its cancellation. The fight was scheduled to proceed with a same-day weigh-in set for 9:00 a.m. local time on the day of the fight. According to the regulations established by the California State Athletic Commission (CSAC), Martínez could not exceed a weight of 126.5 pounds, 10% above the contracted limit. Noncompliance with this weight requirement would result in a mandatory fine. Additionally, the CSAC stated that if Martínez exceeded 15% above the contracted limit, specifically 132.25 pounds for this bout, the fight will be cancelled immediately. The next morning, Martínez weighed in at 122.8 pounds.

González won a commanding unanimous decision over Martínez after 12 rounds, dominating the fight from start to finish with superior skill, precision, and control. From the second round onwards, González demonstrated control over the fight, persistently pushing Martínez onto the defensive and delivering accurate combinations. His punches demonstrated precise placement, frequently aimed at both the head and body of Martínez, while González's elevated guard effectively mitigated Martínez's offensive efforts. The judges ultimately scored the match at 116–112, 117–111, and 118–110 in favor of González. González landed 374 of 1,076 punches (34.8%), more than double Martínez's 182 of 713 (25.5%). Notably, González landed 346 power punches out of 682, showing both accuracy and power, while Martínez managed only 168 out of 451.

==== González vs. Estrada III ====
In May 2022, a mandatory fight was arranged between Estrada and secondary titleholder Joshua Franco after Franco's promoter, Golden Boy, successfully won the purse bid. The fight was originally scheduled for July 16; however, it did not occur. By August, it became clear that the bout would likely be cancelled, as Estrada was contemplating vacating his title to pursue a third fight against González. Estrada intended to participate in a tune-up fight in September, after which he planned to face González in December. In September, Eddie Hearn announced the trilogy fight would take place on 3 December 2022. Weeks later, Desert Diamond Arena in Glendale, Arizona was confirmed as the venue. González successfully weighed in at 114.7 pounds and Estrada met the divisional limit, weighing in at exactly 115 pounds.

There was a crowd of 9,163 as Estrada secured a victory through a majority decision, successfully defending his titles. Nonetheless, the decision sparked controversy, as one judge scored the fight 114–114, while the other two judges awarded Estrada scores of 115–113 and 116–112. ESPN also scored the fight a draw. In the initial stages of the bout, Estrada effectively implemented an outside boxing strategy, utilizing a precise left hand to target González's body, which disrupted González's rhythm and allowed Estrada to win the first five rounds on two scorecards. Conversely, González, after a slow beginning, began to gain momentum in Round 6 by increasing his offensive output and pressuring Estrada against the ropes. This change enabled González to sweep Rounds 6 through 10 on two scorecards, demonstrating his ability to adapt and apply pressure effectively. The championship rounds were decisive for Estrada, who regained control by winning Rounds 11 and 12 on two scorecards. He concluded the fight with notable efficacy, landing 26 punches in the final round, which marked his peak performance of the match. This late effort ultimately contributed to averting a draw and confirming his victory, although the overall outcome raised ongoing questions regarding the resolution of the rivalry.

During the post-fight, Estrada expressed his belief that González deserved a fourth fight, emphasizing that the previous fight clearly indicated his victory. He acknowledged González's status as a future Hall of Famer and attributed his own success to better preparation, while also recognizing González's potential for future achievements in his career. In response, González indicated his willingness to engage in a fourth bout, contingent upon adequate financial compensation. González added that the third fight was his toughest of the three he had with Estrada. According to CompuBox, Estrada landed 217 of 778 (27.9%) and González landed 201 of 732 (27.5%).

=== Bantamweight ===
During an interview in February 2024, González confirmed that while no opponent had been finalized, he would move up in weight and continue his career at bantamweight.

==== González vs. Barrera, Robles ====
In April 2024 it was announced that González would make a ring return after 18-months inactivity against Rober Barrera (27–5, 17 KOs) in a 10-round bantamweight bout at Polideportivo Alexis Argüello in Managua, Nicaragua on July 12, 2024. It was his first fight in Nicaragua since 2015. The card was to be streamed on ESPN+ and ESPN Knockout. Speaking about his comeback, he said, “We are anxious to get back in the ring. This will be a big comeback in my career and I’m grateful it's going to be in front of my Nicaraguan people.” Robles was looking to avenge the defeat González afflicted on his brother Ronald Barrera in Managua in 2013. González explained the difficulties in organising an event in Nicaragua. This was mostly to do with costs, however he was happy that his fans could now see him live. At the weigh in, González weighed in at 116¾ pounds and Barrera was 117 pounds. González scored two knockdowns on his way to a TKO win in the 10th round. In the tenth round, González had Barrera trapped and unloading shots on him when the referee halted the fight. The time was 51 seconds into the round. The first knockdown came in the eighth round following a heavy body shot. A combination of shots dropped him again in the ninth round. González planned to travel to Japan at the end of 2024 for a world title fight.

In February 2025, it was reported that González was in talks to move down to super flyweight and challenge the WBO titleholder Phumulele Cafu (11–0–3, 8 KOs) in Managua, Nicaragua. In April, Cafu instead chose to unify against WBC and RIng Magazine champion Jesse “Bam” Rodriguez on July 19 in Texas.

On July 4, 2025, it was announced that González would once again headline the Polideportivo Alexis Argüello in Managua on September 12 against Mexican boxer Hector Robles (13–8–3, 4 KOs). The card would be held under Gueguense Box Promotions. It was set to be Robles first professional fight outside of Mexico. Despite a slower start, González secured a unanimous decision victory with scores of 96–94, 97–93, and 98–92. Robles began the fight with more activity, landing punches while González seemed hesitant. However, by the third round, González found his rhythm, demonstrating improved footwork and effective body shots that started to shift the momentum in his favor. Although Robles continued to engage and counter, González's steady output and strategic advances allowed him to maintain control of the match. As the fight progressed, Robles stayed active, but González's experience and tactical approach enabled him to increase his volume of punches, establishing a lead in the later rounds. The fight showcased González's resilience and adaptability, particularly as he nears the later stages of his career, indicating a gradual evolution in his fighting style rather than a complete return to previous dominance.

== Professional boxing record ==
57 fights	53 wins	4 losses
By knockout	42	1
By decision	11	3

No.	Result	Record	Opponent	Type	Round, time	Date	Location	Notes
57	Win	53–4	Hector Robles	UD	10	12 Sep 2025	Gimnasio Alexis Argüello, Managua, Nicaragua	
56	Win	52–4	Rober Barrera	TKO	10 (10), 0:55	12 Jul 2024	Polideportivo Alexis Argüello, Managua, Nicaragua	
55	Loss	51–4	Juan Francisco Estrada	MD	12	3 Dec 2022	Desert Diamond Arena, Glendale, Arizona, U.S.	For The Ring and vacant WBC super flyweight titles
54	Win	51–3	Julio Cesar Martinez	UD	12	5 Mar 2022	Pechanga Arena, San Diego, California, U.S.	
53	Loss	50–3	Juan Francisco Estrada	SD	12	13 Mar 2021	American Airlines Center, Dallas, Texas, U.S.	Lost WBA (Super) super flyweight title; For WBC and The Ring super flyweight titles
52	Win	50–2	Israel González	UD	12	23 Oct 2020	Gimnasio TV Azteca, Mexico City, Mexico	Retained WBA (Super) super flyweight title
51	Win	49–2	Kal Yafai	TKO	9 (12), 0:29	29 Feb 2020	Ford Center at The Star, Frisco, Texas, U.S.	Won WBA (Super) super flyweight title
50	Win	48–2	Diomel Diocos	TKO	2 (8), 2:20	23 Dec 2019	Yokohama Arena, Yokohama, Japan	
49	Win	47–2	Moisés Fuentes	KO	5 (10), 1:44	15 Sep 2018	T-Mobile Arena, Paradise, Nevada, U.S.	
48	Loss	46–2	Srisaket Sor Rungvisai	KO	4 (12), 1:18	9 Sep 2017	StubHub Center, Carson, California, U.S.	For WBC super flyweight title
47	Loss	46–1	Srisaket Sor Rungvisai	MD	12	18 Mar 2017	Madison Square Garden, New York City, New York, U.S.	Lost WBC super flyweight title
46	Win	46–0	Carlos Cuadras	UD	12	10 Sep 2016	The Forum, Inglewood, California, U.S.	Won WBC super flyweight title
45	Win	45–0	McWilliams Arroyo	UD	12	23 Apr 2016	The Forum, Inglewood, California, U.S.	Retained WBC and The Ring flyweight titles
44	Win	44–0	Brian Viloria	TKO	9 (12), 2:53	17 Oct 2015	Madison Square Garden, New York City, New York, U.S.	Retained WBC and The Ring flyweight titles
43	Win	43–0	Édgar Sosa	TKO	2 (12), 2:37	16 May 2015	The Forum, Inglewood, California, U.S.	Retained WBC and The Ring flyweight titles
42	Win	42–0	Valentin Leon	TKO	3 (10), 2:27	28 Feb 2015	Puerto Salvador Allende, Managua, Nicaragua	
41	Win	41–0	Rocky Fuentes	TKO	6 (12), 2:11	22 Nov 2014	International Swimming Pool, Yokohama, Japan	Retained WBC and The Ring flyweight titles
40	Win	40–0	Akira Yaegashi	TKO	9 (12), 2:24	5 Sep 2014	Yoyogi National Gymnasium, Tokyo, Japan	Won WBC and The Ring flyweight titles
39	Win	39–0	Juan Purisima	TKO	3 (8), 1:20	6 Apr 2014	Ota City General Gymnasium, Tokyo, Japan	
38	Win	38–0	Juan Kantun	TKO	6 (10), 1:01	15 Feb 2014	Palenque de la Feria Mesoamericana, Tapachula, Mexico	
37	Win	37–0	Oscar Blanquet	TKO	2 (10), 0:27	10 Nov 2013	Ryōgoku Kokugikan, Tokyo, Japan	
36	Win	36–0	Francisco Rodríguez Jr.	TKO	7 (10), 1:10	21 Sep 2013	Crowne Plaza, Managua, Nicaragua	
35	Win	35–0	Ronald Barrera	TKO	5 (10), 2:42	25 May 2013	Polideportivo España, Managua, Nicaragua	
34	Win	34–0	Juan Francisco Estrada	UD	12	17 Nov 2012	Memorial Sports Arena, Los Angeles, California, U.S.	Retained WBA light flyweight title
33	Win	33–0	Stiven Monterrosa	TKO	3 (10), 2:27	6 Oct 2012	Holiday Inn, Managua, Nicaragua	
32	Win	32–0	Ramón García Hirales	KO	4 (12), 2:09	28 Apr 2012	Fairplex, Pomona, California, U.S.	Retained WBA light flyweight title
31	Win	31–0	Manuel Jiménez	KO	1 (10), 2:58	17 Mar 2012	Palenque de Gallos, Culiacán, Mexico	
30	Win	30–0	Omar Soto	KO	2 (12), 0:36	1 Oct 2011	MGM Grand Marquee Ballroom, Paradise, Nevada, U.S.	Retained WBA light flyweight title
29	Win	29–0	Omar Salado	TKO	7 (12), 0:48	16 Jul 2011	Plaza de Toros, Cancún, Mexico	Retained WBA light flyweight title
28	Win	28–0	Manuel Vargas	UD	12	19 Mar 2011	Plaza San Diego, Cholula, Mexico	Retained WBA light flyweight title
27	Win	27–0	Francisco Rosas	KO	2 (12), 1:38	24 Oct 2010	Ryōgoku Kokugikan, Tokyo, Japan	Won vacant WBA interim light flyweight title
26	Win	26–0	Jesus Limones	TKO	2 (10), 0:25	3 Sep 2010	Hotel Camino Real, Managua, Nicaragua	
25	Win	25–0	Ivan Meneses	TKO	4 (12), 3:02	30 Jan 2010	Auditorio Siglo XXI, Puebla City, Mexico	Retained WBA minimumweight title
24	Win	24–0	Katsunari Takayama	UD	12	14 Jul 2009	World Memorial Hall, Kobe, Japan	Retained WBA minimumweight title
23	Win	23–0	Francisco Rosas	MD	12	28 Feb 2009	Auditorio Guelaguetza, Oaxaca City, Mexico	Retained WBA minimumweight title
22	Win	22–0	Miguel Tellez	TKO	3 (10), 0:10	13 Dec 2008	Gimnasio Alexis Argüello, Managua, Nicaragua	
21	Win	21–0	Yutaka Niida	TKO	4 (12), 1:59	15 Sep 2008	Pacifico, Yokohama, Japan	Won WBA minimumweight title
20	Win	20–0	Abraham Irias	TKO	2 (8), 1:02	12 Jul 2008	Universidad, Managua, Nicaragua	
19	Win	19–0	Juan Francisco Centeno	KO	3 (10), 0:02	13 Jun 2008	Hotel Camino Real, Managua, Nicaragua	
18	Win	18–0	Javier Murillo	UD	10	29 Feb 2008	Pharaoh's Casino, Managua, Nicaragua	
17	Win	17–0	Hiroshi Matsumoto	UD	10	14 Jan 2008	Cultural Gymnasium, Yokohama, Japan	
16	Win	16–0	Javier Tello	KO	2 (10), 1:48	14 Dec 2007	Pharaoh's Casino, Managua, Nicaragua	
15	Win	15–0	Eriberto Gejon	KO	1 (10), 1:09	3 Nov 2007	Korakuen Hall, Tokyo, Japan	
14	Win	14–0	Miguel Tellez	KO	3 (10), 0:16	13 Jul 2007	Pharaoh's Casino, Managua, Nicaragua	Retained Nicaraguan light flyweight title
13	Win	13–0	José Luis Varela	KO	1 (10), 2:28	12 May 2007	Pharaoh's Casino, Managua, Nicaragua	Won vacant WBA Fedelatin minimumweight title
12	Win	12–0	Vicente Hernandez	TKO	2 (10), 1:35	30 Mar 2007	Pharaoh's Casino, Managua, Nicaragua	Retained WBA Fedecentro light flyweight title
11	Win	11–0	Elvis Romero	KO	1 (8), 1:01	16 Feb 2007	Pharaoh's Casino, Managua, Nicaragua	
10	Win	10–0	Juan Francisco Centeno	TKO	7 (10), 2:59	15 Dec 2006	Pharaoh's Casino, Managua, Nicaragua	Retained WBA Fedecentro light flyweight title
9	Win	9–0	Oscar Murillo	KO	1 (10), 2:05	6 Oct 2006	Pharaoh's Casino, Managua, Nicaragua	Won vacant WBA Fedecentro and Nicaraguan light flyweight titles
8	Win	8–0	Francisco Meza	KO	2 (8), 2:55	1 Sep 2006	Gimnasio de la Universidad, Managua, Nicaragua	
7	Win	7–0	Francisco Meza	RTD	6 (10), 0:10	31 Mar 2006	Pharaoh's Casino, Managua, Nicaragua	
6	Win	6–0	Jose Martinez	KO	2 (8), 0:06	3 Mar 2006	Pharaoh's Casino, Managua, Nicaragua	
5	Win	5–0	Roberto Meza	TKO	1 (8), 2:18	20 Jan 2006	Pharaoh's Casino, Managua, Nicaragua	
4	Win	4–0	Eddy Castro	KO	3 (6), 2:34	15 Oct 2005	Gimnasio Alexis Argüello, Managua, Nicaragua	
3	Win	3–0	David Centeno	KO	1 (4), 1:42	30 Sep 2005	Pharaoh's Casino, Managua, Nicaragua	
2	Win	2–0	Nicolas Mercado	KO	1 (4), 3:00	19 Aug 2005	Pharaoh's Casino, Managua, Nicaragua	
1	Win	1–0	Ramon Urbina	KO	2 (4), 0:09	1 Jul 2005	Pharaoh's Casino, Managua, Nicaragua	

== Titles in boxing ==
=== Major world titles ===
- WBA minimumweight champion (105 lbs)
- WBA light flyweight champion (108 lbs)
- WBC flyweight champion (112 lbs)
- WBA (Super) super flyweight champion (115 lbs)
- WBC super flyweight champion (115 lbs)

=== The Ring magazine titles ===
- The Ring flyweight champion (112 lbs)

=== Interim world titles ===
- WBA interim light flyweight champion (108 lbs)

=== Regional/International titles ===
- WBA Fedecentro light flyweight champion (108 lbs)
- WBA Fedelatin light flyweight champion (108 lbs)
- Nicaraguan light flyweight champion (108 lbs)

=== Honorary titles ===
- WBC Diamond super flyweight champion

== Personal life ==
González is managed by Carlos Blandon Vidaurre, and is promoted by Japan's Teiken Promotions.

González is divorced, has two children and lives in Managua, Nicaragua. He has stated that although he fights for honour and glory, the main reason is to provide for his family. He is a practicing Christian and a publicly open supporter of the FSLN political group in Nicaragua.

== See also ==
- List of super flyweight boxing champions
- List of flyweight boxing champions
- List of light flyweight boxing champions
- List of minimumweight boxing champions
- List of WBA world champions
- List of WBC world champions
- List of The Ring world champions
- List of boxing quadruple champions

Sporting positions
Regional boxing titles
Vacant Title last held by Jose Jimenez	WBA Fedecentro light flyweight champion 6 October 2006 – May 2007; Vacated	Vacant Title next held by Carlos Tamara
Vacant Title last held by Juan Francisco Centeno	Nicaraguan light flyweight champion 6 October 2006 – December 2011; Vacated	Vacant Title next held by Felix Alvarado
Vacant Title last held by Carlos Melo	WBA Fedelatin minimumweight champion 12 May 2007 – 15 September 2008; Won world title	Vacant Title next held by Luis Alberto Rios
World boxing titles
Preceded by Yutaka Niida	WBA minimumweight champion 15 September 2008 – November 2010; Vacated	Vacant Title next held by Kwanthai Sithmorseng
Vacant Title last held by Juan Carlos Reveco	WBA light flyweight champion Interim title 24 October 2010 – 4 February 2011; Promoted	Vacant Title next held by José Alfredo Rodríguez
Vacant Title last held by Juan Carlos Reveco	WBA light flyweight champion 4 February 2011 – 30 November 2012; Promoted	Vacant Title next held by Kazuto Ioka
Vacant Title last held by Giovanni Segura	WBA light flyweight champion Super title 30 November 2012 – 14 January 2014; Vacated	Vacant
Preceded by Akira Yaegashi	WBC flyweight champion 5 September 2014 – 1 October 2016; Vacated	Vacant Title next held by Juan Hernández
Preceded by Akira Yaegashi	The Ring flyweight champion 5 September 2014 – 1 October 2016; Vacated	Vacant
Preceded by Carlos Cuadras	WBC super flyweight champion 10 September 2016 – 18 March 2017	Succeeded by Srisaket Sor Rungvisai
Preceded by Khalid Yafai	WBA super flyweight champion 29 February 2020 – 3 March 2020; Promoted	Succeeded by Andrew Moloney as Regular champion promoted from interim status
Vacant Title last held by Vic Darchinyan	WBA super flyweight champion Super title 3 March 2020 – 13 March 2021	Succeeded by Juan Francisco Estrada
Achievements
Preceded by Floyd Mayweather Jr.	The Ring Pound for Pound #1 boxer 15 September 2015 – 21 March 2017	Succeeded by Andre Ward
