= José Luis Varela =

Venezuelan boxer

Jose Luis Varela
Personal information
- Nickname: El Olimpico
- Born: 26 September 1978 (age 47) El Vigía, Mérida, Venezuela
- Height: 5 ft 0 1/2 in (154 cm)
- Weight: Mini flyweight; Light flyweight

Boxing career
- Reach: 63.5 in (161 cm)
- Stance: Orthodox

Boxing record
- Total fights: 28
- Wins: 15
- Win by KO: 7
- Losses: 12
- No contests: 1

José Luís Varela Bustamente (born September 27, 1978) is a Venezuelan professional boxer who has challenged four times for a world mini flyweight championship; the WBO title in 2006, and both the WBA and IBF (twice) titles in 2008.

== Amateur career ==
Varela represented Venezuela at the 2000 Summer Olympics in Sydney, Australia. He was defeated in the round of 32 by Cuba's eventual bronze medalist Maikro Romero.

== Professional career ==
Varela won his first professional title, the WBA Fedebol mini flyweight title, on September 24, 2004, with a unanimous decision victory over Miguel Tellez. He has unsuccessfully challenged for a mini flyweight world title four times in his career. He firstly was defeated by Iván Calderón on October 21, 2006, via unanimous decision in a bout for Calderón's WBO mini flyweight title. He then lost to WBA champion Yutaka Niida on March 1, 2008, via sixth-round knockout. Valera was then defeated by IBF champion Raúl García on September 13, 2008, via unanimous decision. García defeated Valera in a rematch exactly three months later, again by unanimous decision, to retain the title again.

== Professional boxing record ==
28 fights	15 wins	12 losses
By knockout	7	6
By decision	8	6
No contests	1	

No.	Result	Record	Opponent	Type	Round, time	Date	Location	Notes
28	Loss	15–12 (1)	Josber Perez	KO	1 (10), 1:22	Jul 15, 2017	Hotel Portofino, Isla Margarita, Venezuela	
27	Loss	15–11 (1)	Luis de la Rosa	KO	2 (10), 2:09	Jun 1, 2017	Plaza de La Paz, Cartagena, Colombia	
26	Loss	15–10 (1)	Alexis Díaz	KO	2 (8), 2:44	Jun 4, 2016	Centro Recreacional Yesterday, Turmero, Venezuela	
25	Loss	15–9 (1)	Kenny Cano	UD	8	Dec 20, 2015	Estadio Francisco De Miranda, La Victoria, Venezuela	
24	Loss	15–8 (1)	Édgar Sosa	TKO	4 (10), 1:33	Aug 7, 2010	Arena México, Mexico City, Mexico	
23	Loss	15–7 (1)	Ramón García Hirales	UD	12	May 30, 2009	Modelo Center, La Paz, Mexico	For vacant WBC International light flyweight title
22	Loss	15–6 (1)	Raúl García	UD	12	Dec 13, 2008	Gimnasio Medardo Meza Dominguez, Loreto, Mexico	For IBF mini flyweight title
21	Loss	15–5 (1)	Raúl García	UD	12	Sep 13, 2008	Estadio de Beisbol Arturo C. Nahl, La Paz, Mexico	For IBF mini flyweight title
20	Loss	15–4 (1)	Yutaka Niida	KO	6 (12), 2:16	Mar 1, 2008	Korakuen Hall, Tokyo, Japan	For WBA mini flyweight title
19	NC	15–3 (1)	Oscar Martinez	NC	1 (10)	Sep 8, 2007	Gimnasio Jose Luis Varela, El Vigía, Venezuela	NC after an accidental head clash
18	Win	15–3	Freddy Canate	UD	10	Jul 30, 2007	El Centro Sambil Margarita, Pampatar, Venezuela	
17	Loss	14–3	Román González	KO	1 (10), 2:28	May 12, 2007	Pharaoh's Casino, Managua, Nicaragua	For vacant WBA Fedelatin mini flyweight title
16	Win	14–2	Carlos Melo	UD	10	Dec 16, 2006	Centro Recreacional Yesterday, Turmero, Venezuela	
15	Loss	13–2	Iván Calderón	UD	12	Oct 21, 2006	Coliseo Elias Chegwin, Barranquilla, Colombia	For WBO mini flyweight title
14	Win	13–1	Walberto Ramos	TKO	12 (12), 2:15	Mar 17, 2006	El Velodromo Teo Capriles, Caracas, Venezuela	Retained WBA Fedebol mini flyweight title
13	Win	12–1	Adolfo Ramos	TKO	8 (10), 2:16	Dec 17, 2005	Centro Recreacional Yesterday, Turmero, Venezuela	
12	Win	11–1	Walberto Ramos	TKO	8 (12), 0:49	Oct 17, 2005	Parque Naciones Unidas, Caracas, Venezuela	Retained WBA Fedebol mini flyweight title
11	Win	10–1	Breilor Teran	SD	10	Mar 5, 2005	Estadio Municipal, Coro, Venezuela	
10	Win	9–1	Miguel Tellez	UD	12	Sep 25, 2004	Caracas, Venezuela	Won vacant WBA Fedebol mini flyweight title
9	Loss	8–1	Carlos Melo	TD	10 (12)	May 25, 2004	Centro de Convenciones Atlapa, Panama City, Panama	For WBA Fedecaribe and WBA Fedecentro mini flyweight titles; Unanimous TD after Valera was cut from an accidental head clash
8	Win	8–0	Over Bolanos	KO	1 (?), 2:10	Apr 12, 2004	Plaza Bicentenaria de Miraflores, Caracas, Venezuela	
7	Win	7–0	Breilor Teran	UD	6	Feb 20, 2004	Centro Comercial Morichal, Turmero, Venezuela	
6	Win	6–0	Jesus Hernandez	UD	4	Oct 27, 2003	Gimnasio Don Jose Beracasa, Caracas, Venezuela	
5	Win	5–0	Jesus Hernandez	UD	4	Sep 13, 2003	Turmero, Venezuela	
4	Win	4–0	Jose Vicente Sanchez	TKO	2 (6), 2:06	Sep 8, 2003	Parque Naciones Unidas, Caracas, Venezuela	
3	Win	3–0	Jose Vicente Sanchez	TKO	3 (6)	May 17, 2003	Centro Recreacional Yesterday, Turmero, Venezuela	
2	Win	2–0	Jose Vicente Sanchez	UD	4	Mar 22, 2003	Centro Recreacional Yesterday, Turmero, Venezuela	
1	Win	1–0	Jose Chacon	KO	3 (4)	Oct 26, 2002	Centro Recreacional Yesterday, Turmero, Venezuela	

Sporting positions
Regional boxing titles
Vacant Title last held by Juan Jose Landaeta	WBA Fedebol mini flyweight champion September 24, 2004 - January 2007; Vacated	Vacant Title next held by Gabriel Mendoza
