= Moisés Fuentes =

Mexican boxer (1985–2022)

Personal information
- Nickname: Moy
- Born: Moisés Fuentes Rubio; 20 September 1985 Mexico City, Mexico
- Died: 24 November 2022 (aged 37)
- Height: 5 ft 6 1/2 in (169 cm)
- Weight: Minimumweight; Junior flyweight; Flyweight; Super flyweight

Boxing career
- Reach: 68 in (173 cm)
- Stance: Orthodox

Boxing record
- Total fights: 33
- Wins: 25
- Win by KO: 14
- Losses: 7
- Draws: 1

Moisés Fuentes Rubio (20 September 1985 – 24 November 2022) was a Mexican professional boxer who held the WBO minimumweight title from 2011 to 2013 and the WBO interim junior flyweight title from 2013 to 2014.

== Professional career ==
He turned pro in 2007. On 6 February 2010, Fuentés won a ten-round unanimous decision over Mexican Eduardo González to capture his first title, the interim WBC Youth minimumweight belt in Guadalajara, Jalisco.

=== WBO minimumweight champion ===
On 27 August 2011, Fuentés won a twelve-round split decision over Raúl García to capture the WBO minimumweight title. The bout was held at the Auditorio Benito Juárez, in Guadalajara. He would go on to vacate the title as he moved up to junior flyweight.

== Personal life and death ==
Fuentes suffered a blood clot in his brain as the result of a 2021 fight with David Cuellar. He never fought again after that and complications from the injury resulted in his death at the age of 37 on November 24, 2022. That was his fifth loss in the last six matches, and his third consecutive inside the distance defeat.

== Professional boxing record ==
33 fights	25 wins	7 losses
By knockout	14	5
By decision	11	2
Draws	1	

No.	Result	Record	Opponent	Type	Round, time	Date	Location	Notes
33	Loss	25–7–1	David Cuellar	KO	6 (10), 2:11	16 Oct 2021	Oasis Hotel Complex, Cancún, Mexico	For vacant WBC Silver Youth super flyweight title.
32	Loss	25–6–1	Román González	KO	5 (10), 1:44	15 Sep 2018	T-Mobile Arena, Paradise, Nevada, U.S.	
31	Loss	25–5–1	Daigo Higa	KO	1 (12), 2:32	4 Feb 2018	Prefectural Budokan, Naha, Japan	For WBC flyweight title
30	Win	25–4–1	Ulises Lara	KO	1 (10), 2:40	28 Oct 2017	Domo Sindicato de Trabajadores IMSS, Tlalpan, Mexico	
29	Loss	24–4–1	Ulises Lara	MD	10	8 Jul 2017	Centro de Convenciones IMSS, Tlalpan, Mexico	
28	Loss	24–3–1	Kosei Tanaka	TKO	5 (12), 1:52	31 Dec 2016	Memorial Hall, Gifu, Japan	For vacant WBO junior flyweight title
27	Win	24–2–1	Rommel Asenjo	TKO	1 (10), 1:48	2 Apr 2016	Auditorio BB, Mexico City, Mexico	
26	Win	23–2–1	Francisco Rodríguez Jr.	SD	12	5 Dec 2015	Gimnasio Municipal Gustavo Díaz Ordaz, Tecate, Mexico	
25	Win	22–2–1	Oswaldo Novoa	KO	6 (10), 1:01	25 Jul 2015	Polideportivo Centenario, Los Mochis, Mexico	Won vacant WBO–NABO flyweight title
24	Win	21–2–1	Francisco Antonio Hernandez	UD	6	28 Mar 2015	Poliforum Zamna, Mérida, Mexico	
23	Win	20–2–1	Antonio Rodriguez	KO	4 (6), 1:54	8 Nov 2014	Gimnasio Nuevo León, Monterrey, Mexico	
22	Loss	19–2–1	Donnie Nietes	TKO	9 (12), 2:56	10 May 2014	Mall of Asia Arena, Pasay, Philippines	For WBO and vacant The Ring junior flyweight titles
21	Win	19–1–1	Omar Salado	TKO	7 (10), 2:26	22 Nov 2013	Forum Tecate, Tijuana, Mexico	
20	Win	18–1–1	Luis De la Rosa	TKO	1 (12), 2:40	7 Sep 2013	Palenque de la Feria Mesoamericana, Tapachula, Mexico	Won WBO interim junior flyweight title
19	Win	17–1–1	Gerardo Verde	UD	10	28 Jun 2013	Forum Tecate, Tijuana, Mexico	
18	Draw	16–1–1	Donnie Nietes	MD	12	2 Mar 2013	Waterfront Hotel & Casino, Cebu City, Philippines	For WBO junior flyweight title
17	Win	16–1	Iván Calderón	TKO	5 (12), 1:22	6 Oct 2012	Coliseo Rubén Rodríguez, Bayamón, Puerto Rico	Retained WBO mini flyweight title
16	Win	15–1	Julio César Félix	KO	1 (12), 2:16	2 Jun 2012	El Foro, Tijuana, Mexico	Retained WBO mini flyweight title
15	Win	14–1	Raúl García	SD	12	27 Aug 2011	Auditorio Benito Juarez, Guadalajara, Mexico	Won WBO mini flyweight title
14	Win	13–1	Sergio Nuñez	SD	4	28 May 2011	Palenque del FEX, Mexicali, Mexico	
13	Loss	12–1	Juan Hernández	SD	12	5 Feb 2011	Sala de Armas, Mexico City, Mexico	For WBC–NABF mini flyweight title
12	Win	12–0	Jorge Guerrero	TKO	1 (6), 2:34	21 Aug 2010	Auditorio Municipal, Tijuana, Mexico	
11	Win	11–0	Eduardo Gonzalez	UD	6	19 Jun 2010	Plaza de Toros, San Juan del Río, Mexico	
10	Win	10–0	Eduardo Gonzalez	UD	10	6 Feb 2010	Complejo Panamericano, Guadalajara, Mexico	Won WBC interim Youth mini flyweight title
9	Win	9–0	Orlando García	TKO	1 (6)	23 Sep 2009	Restaurante Arroyo, Mexico City, Mexico	
8	Win	8–0	Edgar Jimenez	TKO	5 (8), 0:53	5 Aug 2009	Foro Scotiabank, Mexico City, Mexico	
7	Win	7–0	Victor Trejo	RTD	6 (8), 0:10	27 May 2009	Foro Scotiabank, Mexico City, Mexico	
6	Win	6–0	Vicente Hernández	UD	8	31 Jan 2009	Telmex Auditorium, Zapopan, Mexico	
5	Win	5–0	Pascasio Zarate	UD	6	15 Oct 2008	Foro Scotiabank, Mexico City, Mexico	
4	Win	4–0	Ivan Díaz	TKO	2 (6)	19 Apr 2008	Salón Emperador, Mexico City, Mexico	
3	Win	3–0	Osvaldo Razon	UD	4	2 Aug 2007	Vive Cuervo Salón, Mexico City, Mexico	
2	Win	2–0	Victor Trejo	SD	4	30 Jun 2007	Salón 21, Mexico City, Mexico	
1	Win	1–0	David Solano	TKO	2 (4)	31 May 2007	Salón 21, Mexico City, Mexico	

== See also ==
- List of Mexican boxing world champions
- List of WBO world champions
- List of strawweight boxing champions

Sporting positions
Regional boxing titles
Vacant Title last held by Jesús Silvestre	WBC Youth minimumweight champion Interim title 6 February 2010 – Jun 2010; Vacated	Title discontinued
Vacant Title last held by Rayonta Whitfield	WBO–NABO flyweight champion 25 July 2015 – Jan 2016; Vacated	Vacant Title next held by Joebert Alvarez
World boxing titles
Preceded by Raúl García	WBO minimumweight champion 27 August 2011 – 19 April 2013; Vacated	Succeeded by Merlito Sabillo promoted from interim status
Vacant Title last held by Jesús Géles	WBO junior flyweight champion Interim title 7 September 2013 – 10 May 2014; Lost bid for full title	Vacant
Minimumweight status
Preceded by Keitaro Hoshino	Latest born world champion to die November 24, 2022 – present	Incumbent
Status (all weights)
Preceded by Edwin Valero	Latest born world champion to die November 24, 2022 – August 21, 2026	Succeeded by Zolani Tete
