= Ronald Barrera =

Colombian boxer (born 1984)

Personal information
- Nickname: El Indio
- Nationality: Colombian
- Born: Ronald Ortega Barrera; 12 October 1984 (age 41) Barranquilla, Colombia
- Height: 5 ft 3 in (160 cm)
- Weight: Minimumweight; Light flyweight; Flyweight; Super flyweight; Bantamweight

Boxing career
- Stance: Southpaw

Boxing record
- Total fights: 46
- Wins: 30
- Win by KO: 18
- Losses: 14
- Draws: 2

Ronald Barrera (born 12 October 1984) is a Colombian professional boxer who currently fights in the flyweight division and has fought for major world titles five times, losing each attempt.

== World title challenges ==
On 4 March 2006 Barrera lost to Yutaka Niida by unanimous decision for the WBA minimumweight world title.

On 28 April 2007 Barrera lost to Iván Calderón by split decision for the WBO minimumweight world title.

On 11 April 2009 Barrera lost to Raúl García by sixth round technical knockout for the IBF minimumweight world title.

On 18 December 2009 Barrera lost to Juan Carlos Reveco by third round knockout for the interim WBA light flyweight world title.

On 4 September 2010 Barrera lost to Omar Niño Romero by seventh round technical decision for the WBC light flyweight world title.

== Other notable fighters faced ==
On 21 January 2012 Barrera lost to Julio Ceja by fourth round knockout.

On 9 September 2012 Barrera lost to Carlos Cuadras by seventh round technical knockout.

On 25 May 2013 Barrera lost to Román González by fifth round technical knockout in a bantamweight bout.

== Professional boxing record ==
46 fights	30 wins	14 losses
By knockout	18	6
By decision	12	8
Draws	2	

No.	Result	Record	Opponent	Type	Round, time	Date	Location	Notes
46	Loss	30–14–2	(Colombia) Jesus Martinez	UD	10	30 October 2015	Centro Recreativo Tacasuam, Montería, Colombia	
45	Loss	30–13–2	(Venezuela) Liborio Solís	UD	10	4 March 2015	Fantastic Casino de Albrook Mall, Panama City, Panama	
44	Loss	30–12–2	(Nicaragua) Román González	TKO	5 (10), 2:42	25 May 2013	Polideportivo España, Managua, Nicaragua	
43	Loss	30–11–2	(Colombia) Pablo Carrillo	UD	10	2 March 2013	Coliseo del Colegio Biffi La Salle, Barranquilla, Colombia	For vacant Colombian flyweight title
42	Loss	30–10–2	(Mexico) Carlos Cuadras	TKO	7 (12), 1:54	29 September 2012	Estadio Héctor Espino, Hermosillo, Mexico	For vacant WBC Silver super flyweight title
41	Win	30–9–2	(Colombia) Nelson Cantero	UD	6	31 August 2012	Centro Recreacional Las Vegas, Barranquilla, Colombia	
40	Loss	29–9–2	(Mexico) Julio Ceja	KO	4 (12), 2:21	21 January 2012	Centro de Convenciones, Jilotepec, Mexico	For vacant WBC FECARBOX bantamweight title
39	Win	29–8–2	(Mexico) Arturo Badillo	RTD	8 (10), 3:00	3 December 2011	Auditorio Ernesto Rufo, Rosarito, Mexico	
38	Win	28–8–2	(Colombia) Daniel Romero	KO	6 (8)	15 April 2011	Centro Recreacional Las Vegas, Barranquilla, Colombia	
37	Win	27–8–2	(Colombia) Benjamin Rivas	UD	8	28 January 2011	Centro Recreacional Las Vegas, Barranquilla, Colombia	
36	Loss	26–8–2	(Mexico) Omar Niño Romero	RTD	6 (12), 3:00	4 September 2010	Coliseo Olimpico de la UG, Guadalajara, Mexico	For WBC light flyweight title
35	Win	26–7–2	(Mexico) Arturo Badillo	TKO	9 (12), 2:26	10 April 2010	Palenque del Parque Morelos, Tijuana, Mexico	Won vacant WBC FECARBOX flyweight title
34	Loss	25–7–2	(Argentina) Juan Carlos Reveco	KO	3 (12), 2:56	18 December 2009	Polideportivo La Colonia, Junín, Argentina	For WBA interim light flyweight title
33	Draw	25–6–2	(Colombia) Michael Arango	PTS	10	27 October 2009	Coliseo Kid Dumlop, Santa Marta, Colombia	
32	Loss	25–6–1	(Mexico) Raúl García	TKO	6 (12), 2:26	11 April 2009	Estadio de Beisbol Arturo C. Nahl, La Paz, Mexico	For IBF minimumweight title
31	Win	25–5–1	(Colombia) Elkin Zavaleta	UD	8	2 December 2008	Centro Recreacional Las Vegas, Barranquilla, Colombia	
30	Win	24–5–1	(Colombia) Wilmer Jinete	UD	10	23 October 2008	Centro Recreacional Las Vegas, Barranquilla, Colombia	
29	Win	23–5–1	(South Africa) Zukisani Kwayiba	KO	2 (12), 2:26	29 August 2008	Carousel Casino, Hammanskraal, South Africa	
28	Loss	22–5–1	(Venezuela) Juan Jose Landaeta	SD	11	7 June 2008	Centro Olimpico, San Juan de los Morros, Venezuela	For vacant WBA Fedelatin flyweight title
27	Win	22–4–1	(Colombia) Nelson Cantero	KO	6 (10), 2:44	15 May 2008	Coliseo de Combate, Cartagena, Colombia	
26	Loss	21–4–1	(Mexico) Raúl García	UD	12	29 February 2008	Estadio de Beisbol Arturo C. Nahl, La Paz, Mexico	
25	Win	21–3–1	(Colombia) Jose Humberto Caraballo	KO	2 (10)	28 September 2007	Centro Recreacional Las Vegas, Barranquilla, Colombia	
24	Win	20–3–1	(Colombia) Nelson Cantero	UD	8	29 June 2007	Centro Recreacional Las Vegas, Barranquilla, Colombia	
23	Loss	19–3–1	(Puerto Rico) Iván Calderón	SD	12	28 April 2007	Coliseo Universidad del Norte, Barranquilla, Colombia	For WBO minimumweight title
22	Win	19–2–1	(Colombia) Jose Humberto Caraballo	KO	3 (10)	2 February 2007	Centro Recreacional Las Vegas, Barranquilla, Colombia	
21	Win	18–2–1	(Colombia) Carlos Guerrero	KO	2 (8)	27 October 2006	Centro Recreacional Las Vegas, Barranquilla, Colombia	
20	Win	17–2–1	(Colombia) Wilson Cortina	KO	2 (10)	29 September 2006	Centro Recreacional Las Vegas, Barranquilla, Colombia	
19	Win	16–2–1	(Colombia) Wilmer Jinete	UD	8	30 June 2006	Coliseo Elias Chegwin, Barranquilla, Colombia	
18	Win	15–2–1	(Colombia) Gustavo Cortes	RTD	3 (4)	12 May 2006	Centro Recreacional Las Vegas, Barranquilla, Colombia	
17	Loss	14–2–1	(Japan) Yutaka Niida	UD	12	4 March 2006	Korakuen Hall, Tokyo, Japan	For WBA minimumweight title
16	Win	14–1–1	(Colombia) Nelson Cantero	KO	6 (10)	18 November 2005	Polideportivo Municipio, Puerto Colombia, Colombia	Won Colombian super flyweight title
15	Loss	13–1–1	(Panama) Carlos Melo	MD	12	15 October 2005	Figali Convention Center, Panama City, Panama	For vacant WBA Fedelatin minimumweight title
14	Win	13–0–1	(Colombia) Alfonso De la Hoz	UD	12	17 June 2005	Estadio de Los Caracoles, Cartagena, Colombia	Won Colombian light flyweight title
13	Draw	12–0–1	(Colombia) Walberto Ramos	PTS	10	20 May 2005	Barranquilla, Colombia	
12	Win	12–0	(Colombia) Jose Luis Bolanos	TKO	3 (?)	2 April 2005	Barranquilla, Colombia	
11	Win	11–0	(Colombia) Eliecer Munoz	KO	4 (?)	6 December 2004	Barranquilla, Colombia	
10	Win	10–0	(Colombia) Alejandro Martinez	TKO	1 (?)	15 October 2004	Coliseo Bernardo Caraballo, Cartagena, Colombia	
9	Win	9–0	(Colombia) Gustavo Cortes	PTS	10	4 September 2004	Puerto Colombia, Colombia	Won Colombian minimumweight title
8	Win	8–0	(Colombia) Luis Caballero	KO	2 (?)	7 August 2004	Barrio El Líbano, Cartagena, Colombia	
7	Win	7–0	(Colombia) Elkin Zavaleta	PTS	6	17 July 2004	Coliseo Cubierto, Puerto Colombia, Colombia	
6	Win	6–0	(Colombia) Nestor Arroyo	KO	2 (?)	3 July 2004	Barranquilla, Colombia	
5	Win	5–0	(Colombia) Edgar Arroyo	KO	2 (?)	14 June 2004	Barranquilla, Colombia	
4	Win	4–0	(Colombia) Jose Luis Bolanos	KO	2 (?)	5 June 2004	Barranquilla, Colombia	
3	Win	3–0	(Colombia) Nestor Arroyo	PTS	6	15 May 2004	Cartagena, Colombia	
2	Win	2–0	(Colombia) Elkin Zavaleta	PTS	4	1 May 2004	Barranquilla, Colombia	
1	Win	1–0	(Colombia) Alfredo Ochoa	PTS	4	27 March 2004	Barranquilla, Colombia	
