= Iván Calderón (boxer) =

Puerto Rican boxer (born 1975)

Personal information
- Nicknames: Iron Boy; El Niño de Hierro
- Born: Iván Calderón Marrero; January 27, 1975 (age 51) Guaynabo, Puerto Rico
- Height: 5 ft (152 cm)
- Weight: Mini flyweight; Light flyweight

Boxing career
- Reach: 63 in (160 cm)
- Stance: Southpaw

Boxing record
- Total fights: 39
- Wins: 35
- Win by KO: 6
- Losses: 3
- Draws: 1
Medal record
Men's amateur boxing
Representing Puerto Rico
Pan American Games
Bronze medal – third place	1999 Winnipeg	Light flyweight
Central American and Caribbean Games
Bronze medal – third place	1998 Maracaibo	Light flyweight

Iván Calderón Marrero (born January 27, 1975) is a Puerto Rican former professional boxer who competed from 2001 to 2012. He is a two-weight world champion, having held the WBO mini flyweight title from 2003 to 2007 (making eleven successful defenses and being recognized as super champion by the organization), and the WBO, Ring magazine, and lineal light flyweight titles from 2007 to 2010 (making six successful defenses). Additionally, his August 2010 bout against Giovani Segura was named fight of the year by Ring magazine. As an amateur Calderón represented Puerto Rico in international competitions, including the 2000 Olympics.

Calderon was inducted into the International Boxing Hall of Fame as part of the class of 2024 along such other notables as Michael Moorer, Diego Corrales, Ana Maria Torres, Ricky Hatton and Nick Charles.

== Personal life ==
Iván Calderón was born in the municipality of Guaynabo, Puerto Rico and currently resides in a sector called "Las Americas" in Bayamón. Iván had a troubling childhood surrounded by violence and problems, which according to him has helped him develop more patience which has helped him in his personal life. Calderón attended middle school in José Nevárez Landrón School, located in Toa Baja, Puerto Rico. His first wife was Wilma Laguna, with whom he has two children, Wilvani and Iván junior. In an interview with El Nuevo Día he noted that he engaged Laguna on August 29, 1997, following a quinceañero and the couple married on February 5, 1999. According to him the couple had some disagreements when they met, based on some attitudes he presented, he also notes that he felt she was arrogant at first. However, on one day he decided to propose to her and after four months of establishing a relationship the couple moved in together. Calderón expressed that he is "too much of a house man" and claims that as a result of a rule established by his former wife any kind of non-familiar activity was prohibited on Sundays. In January 2009, it was made public that Calderón and Laguna had established a divorce process.

He is married to A. Maldonado Garcia Dennisse; a prepared and educated woman. Maldonado has his Bachelors of Business Administration from the University Ana G. Mendez. Currently has a daughter named Diannelys E. Calderon.

Calderón spends the money that he earns boxing on properties and he is associated with a company dedicated to satellite vehicle tracking. He is employed by the City of Guaynabo's Department of Sports and Recreation and has been involved in several youth-oriented charities in his native Puerto Rico, including lecturing in island schools and co-sponsoring a massive gift-giving effort in the town of Loíza's Three Kings festival in early 2006. As a result of his charitable efforts with children that live in poor communities he was awarded a special award at the World Boxing Organization's 2007 annual convention.

On November 16, 2011, Federal agents in Puerto Rico seized more than $4 million worth cocaine from a house owned by Calderon. Drug Enforcement Administration spokeswoman Laila Rico said 225 kilograms (nearly 500 pounds) of cocaine were found when agents raided the house in the coastal town of Humacao. Calderon denied knowledge of the narcotics and was never formally charged with an offence.

== Amateur career ==
In 1993, Calderón defeated Miguel Cotto in the light flyweight division, when both boxers were in the early stages of amateur experience. Following this, both athletes developed a close friendship. Calderón lost to Brian Viloria once during his amateur boxing career, but defeated him three times before turning professional. In addition, Calderon competed as an international amateur in several tournaments, including the following:

- 1999 3rd place as a Light Flyweight at Pan-American Games in Winnipeg, Canada. Results were:
  - Defeated Wilfrido Valez (Colombia) points
  - Defeated Mendeo Winston (Dominican Republic) points
  - Lost to Maikro Romero (Cuba) points
- 2000 represented Puerto Rico as a light flyweight at the 2000 Sydney Olympic Games. Result was:
  - Lost to Masara La Paene (Indonesia) points

== Professional career ==
After turning professional, Calderón was frequently showcased on ESPN's Friday Night Fights show. On July 1, 2001, Calderón defeated José Manuel Ramírez by unanimous decision. During this fight, he suffered an open wound over his right eyebrow, which required surgery. On May 3, 2003, Calderón became a world champion for the first time, defeating Eduardo Marquez by a technical decision in nine rounds at Las Vegas, as part of the de la Hoya-Campas undercard, to win the World Boxing Organization's world strawweight title. He had dropped Marquez twice before the end of the fight. Calderón retained his title by a 12-round decision in his first defense, on September 5, over Lorenzo Trejo of Mexico, at Caguas, Puerto Rico. In his second defense, held at Bayamón, he defeated former world champion Alex Sanchez by a unanimous twelve-round decision. On March 20, 2004, he retained the championship with an eleventh-round knockout win over former International Boxing Federation world champion Edgar Cardenas, in Guaynabo. Before that fight, Calderón obtained his high school credit diploma.

On July 31, 2004, as part of the Morales-Hernandez undercard in Las Vegas, he retained his title once again, with a twelve-round decision win over former world champion Roberto Leyva. On November 23 of that year, he made his fifth defense, defeating Nicaraguan Carlos Fajardo by a twelve-round unanimous decision. As part of the Barrera-Morales III undercard. His fight with Fajardo was shown live on HBO's Pay per view. On April 30, of 2005, he retained the title with an eighth-round knockout victory over Noel Tunacao, a member of the Tunacao boxing family of the Philippines. On September 25, he retained his title for the seventh time, with a twelve-round unanimous decision over Mexico's Gerardo Verde, at Atlantic City, New Jersey.

On December 10, 2004, Calderón retained the title again, this time with a twelve-round unanimous decision over former world champion Daniel Reyes. Calderón began 2006 by defending his title successfully on February 18, with a twelve-round unanimous decision over Isaac Bustos in Las Vegas. He would defend his title successfully twice in 2006 after his fight with Isaac Bustos. On April 29 against Miguel Tellez winning the fight by technical knock out thus gaining his sixth knock out victory. He finished his boxing year on October 21 by defeating José Luis Varela of Venezuela by unanimous decision. Following this fight the World Boxing Organization recognized him as a WBO Super Champion for reaching ten successful title defenses. On his first fight of 2007 that took place on March 28 in Barranquilla, Colombia Calderón defeated Ronald Barrera by split decision. Following his fight against Barrera Calderón announced that he was interested in changing weight and challenge one of the champions in the light flyweight division thus finishing his minimum weight run after twelve successful defenses of the division's title.

During this timeframe, Freddie Roach selected Calderón as a sparring partner for Oscar De La Hoya. The reason for this was that the trainer was seeking a fast adversary. On November 16, 2008, Roach rememorated the event in his blog for The Ring, stating that "Calderon slapped Oscar around like it was unbelievable." The trainer also noted that he asked De La Hoya to pursue the offense, but the boxer's attempts were unsuccessful. In response, Calderón expressed that he participated in "three or four rounds" of sparring, during which he "gave him problems" and "made him uncomfortable", while De La Hoya "tried to hit" but seemed "out of timing". Similarly, Calderón competed against Shane Mosley in a four-round sparring match. The session was in preparation, serving as training for the first of a series of fights against Hugo Cázares. During the actual contest, Mosley had problems landing punches due to his adversary's speed. While Calderón recognized that his opponent's weight made the practice feel like a complete workout. Subsequently, Mosley expressed that "Iván uses the angles very well and sparring against someone that moves so much is fun". Calderón noted that competing against a heavier boxer helped him adjust to the pressure that could be presented by Cázares.

=== Light flyweight division ===
On August 25, 2007, Calderón defeated Hugo Cázares by split decision to become the WBO and Lineal Light Flyweight Champion. Calderón entered the ring accompanied by a display of fireworks, before a crowd that featured several media personalities, including Oscar De La Hoya. The size difference between both pugilists was evident since the moment that they stood next to each other prior to the beginning of the fight. Early in the fight Calderón's tactic consisted of connecting fast consecutive combinations while avoiding Cázares' punches. With this strategy he managed to stun Cazares with uppercuts and straight punches. During the fight the crowd displayed support for Calderón, at one point chanting "Olé" when his adversary's punches missed. In the third round Cázares displayed a more fluid offensive, but in the fifth he presented a strategy that consisted of only throwing power punches which seemed to benefit Calderón. In the seventh round Ivan's offensive pace slowed which benefited Hugo who improved on the offensive aspect. In the eighth round Cázares connected several hard punches which led to Calderón to rely on holds to slow his offense, in this round Cázares scored a knockdown. In the ninth he was in a defensive stance, and during the last rounds he continued this pattern and only connected solidly in the tenth round while Cázares missed several of the punches he threw. At the conclusion of the fight the judges awarded scores of 116-111 for Cázares and 115-112 twice for Calderón. With this victory he became the eleventh Puerto Rican boxer to win multiple world championships and unified this championship with the minimum division's one until he vacated it following the announcement that he was going to continue in the light flyweight division. The Ring also recognized Calderón as their champion, dethroning Cázares.

Calderón was successful on his first light flyweight title defense when he defeated Juan Esquer in a card that took place on December 1, 2007, in New Mexico. During the course of the fight Esquer was more active offensively. During the first four rounds of the match Calderón used his boxing skills to avoid being hit by the punches thrown by Esquer. From the fifth round onwards Calderón proceeded to exchange combinations of punches with Esquer, eventually gaining control of the fight's tempo. The fight lasted twelve rounds and Iván won the fight by unanimous decision with the judges awarding scores of 116–112, 118-110 and 115–113. Calderón's second defense in the light flyweight division took place on April 4, 2008, where he defeated Nelson Dieppa by unanimous decision. The three judges awarded him identical scores of 120–108.

Following a protest, the World Boxing Organization named Cázares the mandatory challenger for the championship. The event was scheduled for August 30, 2008. Calderón entered the ring dressed as a matador in reference to his boxing style, which provoked "Olé" chants from the public. In the early stages, the fight's pattern was similar to the first meeting. Calderón relied on counter punching while boxing to avoid Cázares' offensive. Late in the first round, the challenger fell following a combination, but the referee declared that it was an accidental slip. In the following rounds, Cázares tried pressuring in the offensive, but Calderón continued boxing and held his opponent if approached. The challenger was momentarily stunned by an uppercut in the final seconds of the third episode. Cázares' technique in the next two rounds consisted of throwing punches to the body, while his offensive to the head was being stopped by his opponent's forearms. In the sixth round, Calderón focused on his defense, slowing the pace of his offensive. In the seventh episode, an accidental head clash opened a laceration in Calderón's forehead. Who was examined by the ringside doctor, after expressing that he was feeling disoriented. The physician recommended stopping the fight. Due to the circumstances, the outcome was decided by the judges' score cards, which favored Calderón 67-66 and 68-65 twice. Following the event, he announced his intention to participate in a unification match against one of the other light flyweight champions. Due to the nature of this injury, the Puerto Rico Boxing Commission prohibited Calderón participation in any card within 120 days. Two weeks after the contest, the wound was reopened and he underwent plastic surgery to prevent reinjury. On September 23, 2008, Peter Rivera announced that Calderón was expected to return between January and February 2009. Rivera noted that the fight would be against one of the other light flyweight champions, most likely César Canchila, citing that although both Ulises Solís and Edgar Sosa were approached, with both claiming to be available, neither one actually pursued serious negotiations. He subsequently stated that negotiations had been extended to Solís' representatives, but that those of Sosa still declined, citing that "[He] is a fighter that has always refused to fight with Iván. His managers don't want to sacrifice him and prefer to keep him in Mexico competing in soft fights." In the meanwhile, he received a homage as part of the Dominican Parade in San Juan, serving as Padrino Internacional (lit. "International Godfather") along Juan Manuel López.

On June 13, 2009, Calderón defended the championship against Rodel Mayol. During the first stage, both pugilists fought in the middle of the ring, while he focused on attacking the body while the challenger employed jabs. During the second and third rounds, Mayol pressured the offensive, managing to land a moderate number of punches. In the fourth round, Calderón began pursuing the offensive, while avoiding Mayol's punches. This continued in the following chapter, but a head clash opened another laceration on his forehead, he continued the contest, but was more aggressive from this point onwards. Calderón's corner tried to stop the bleeding, but the referee suspended the contest during the sixth round after these attempts proven unsuccessful. The fight was declared a technical draw, with both fighters receiving a 58-56 card while the third judge scored in 57-57. An immediate rematch was scheduled three months later. Calderón began this contest by effectively avoiding Mayol's constant attack, while throwing limited punches. This pattern continued during the following three rounds. In the fifth, Mayol connected his best punch of the fight, winning the round. To retaliate, Calderón became more aggressive, throwing more combinations. The seventh round began with exchanges from both boxers, but a head clash opens another laceration that stops the fight. The contest was declared a technical decision, with the judges offering scores of 68-65 twice for Calderón and 68-65 for Mayol.

== Retirement ==
On October 29, 2012, almost a month after his last fight, Calderón officially announced his retirement from professional boxing. The announcement was made during the inauguration of the Félix Pagán Pintor Gymnasium in Guaynabo, Puerto Rico. Calderón will now work as administrator of the gymnasium.

== Professional boxing record ==
39 fights	35 wins	3 losses
By knockout	6	3
By decision	29	0
Draws	1	

No.	Result	Record	Opponent	Type	Round, time	Date	Location	Notes
39	Loss	35–3–1	Moisés Fuentes	TKO	5 (12), 1:22	6 Oct 2012	Coliseo Rubén Rodríguez, Bayamón, Puerto Rico	For WBO mini flyweight title
38	Win	35–2–1	Felipe Rivas	SD	12	29 Oct 2011	Mario Morales Coliseum, Guaynabo, Puerto Rico	Won vacant WBO Latino mini flyweight title
37	Loss	34–2–1	Giovani Segura	KO	3 (12), 1:39	2 Apr 2011	Auditorio del Estado, Mexicali, Mexico	For WBO and The Ring light flyweight titles
36	Loss	34–1–1	Giovani Segura	KO	8 (12), 1:34	28 Aug 2010	Mario Morales Coliseum, Guaynabo, Puerto Rico	For WBA (Unified) light flyweight title; Lost WBO and The Ring light flyweight titles
35	Win	34–0–1	Jesus Iribe	UD	12	12 Jun 2010	Madison Square Garden, New York City, New York, U.S.	Retained WBO and The Ring light flyweight titles
34	Win	33–0–1	Rodel Mayol	TD	7 (12), 3:00	12 Sep 2009	José Miguel Agrelot Coliseum, Hato Rey, Puerto Rico	Retained WBO and The Ring light flyweight titles; Split TD after Calderón cut from accidental head clash
33	Draw	32–0–1	Rodel Mayol	TD	6 (12), 1:50	13 Jun 2009	Madison Square Garden, New York City, New York, U.S.	Retained WBO and The Ring light flyweight titles; Split TD after Calderón cut from accidental head clash
32	Win	32–0	Hugo Cázares	TD	7 (12), 1:58	30 Aug 2008	Coliseo Rubén Rodríguez, Bayamón, Puerto Rico	Retained WBO and The Ring light flyweight titles; Unanimous TD after Calderón cut from accidental head clash
31	Win	31–0	Nelson Dieppa	UD	12	5 Apr 2008	Coliseo Roberto Clemente, San Juan, Puerto Rico	Retained WBO and The Ring light flyweight titles
30	Win	30–0	Juan Esquer	UD	12	1 Dec 2007	Tingley Coliseum, Albuquerque, New Mexico, U.S.	Retained WBO and The Ring light flyweight titles
29	Win	29–0	Hugo Cázares	SD	12	25 Aug 2007	Coliseo Rubén Rodríguez, Bayamón, Puerto Rico	Won WBO and The Ring light flyweight titles
28	Win	28–0	Ronald Barrera	SD	12	28 Apr 2007	Coliseo Universidad del Norte, Barranquilla, Colombia	Retained WBO mini flyweight title
27	Win	27–0	José Luis Varela	UD	12	21 Oct 2006	Coliseo Elias Chegwin, Barranquilla, Colombia	Retained WBO mini flyweight title
26	Win	26–0	Miguel Tellez	TKO	9 (12), 1:04	29 Apr 2006	Mario Morales Coliseum, Guaynabo, Puerto Rico	Retained WBO mini flyweight title
25	Win	25–0	Isaac Bustos	UD	12	18 Feb 2006	The Aladdin, Paradise, Nevada, U.S.	Retained WBO mini flyweight title
24	Win	24–0	Daniel Reyes	UD	12	10 Dec 2005	Coliseo Roberto Clemente, San Juan, Puerto Rico	Retained WBO mini flyweight title
23	Win	23–0	Gerardo Verde	UD	12	25 Jun 2005	Boardwalk Hall, Atlantic City, New Jersey, U.S.	Retained WBO mini flyweight title
22	Win	22–0	Noel Tunacao	TKO	8 (12), 2:25	30 Apr 2005	José Miguel Agrelot Coliseum, Hato Rey, Puerto Rico	Retained WBO mini flyweight title
21	Win	21–0	Carlos Fajardo	UD	12	27 Nov 2004	MGM Grand Garden Arena, Paradise, Nevada, U.S.	Retained WBO mini flyweight title
20	Win	20–0	Roberto Carlos Leyva	UD	12	31 Jul 2004	MGM Grand Garden Arena, Paradise, Nevada, U.S.	Retained WBO mini flyweight title
19	Win	19–0	Edgar Cardenas	KO	11 (12), 1:33	20 Mar 2004	Mario Morales Coliseum, Guaynabo, Puerto Rico	
18	Win	18–0	Alex Sánchez	UD	12	6 Dec 2003	Coliseo Rubén Rodríguez, Bayamón, Puerto Rico	Retained WBO mini flyweight title
17	Win	17–0	Lorenzo Trejo	UD	12	5 Sep 2003	Coliseo Héctor Solá Bezares, Caguas, Puerto Rico	Retained WBO mini flyweight title
16	Win	16–0	Eduardo Ray Márquez	TD	9 (12), 0:43	3 May 2003	Mandalay Bay Resort and Casino, Paradise, Nevada, U.S.	Won WBO mini flyweight title;
15	Win	15–0	Juan Carlos Perez	UD	10	7 Mar 2003	Coliseo Pedrin Zorrilla, San Juan, Puerto Rico	
14	Win	14–0	Valentin Leon	UD	10	20 Dec 2002	Coliseo Marron Aponte, Aibonito, Puerto Rico	
13	Win	13–0	Lee Marvin Sandoval	UD	12	22 Nov 2002	Coliseo Marron Aponte, Aibonito, Puerto Rico	Won vacant WBO–NABO mini flyweight title
12	Win	12–0	Roberto Gomez	UD	10	6 Sep 2002	Community Center, Victoria, Texas, U.S.	
11	Win	11–0	Alejandro Moreno	UD	10	30 Jul 2002	Lucky Star Casino, Concho, Oklahoma, U.S.	
10	Win	10–0	Carlos Lopez	UD	4	3 May 2002	The Orleans Hotel and Casino, Paradise, Nevada, U.S.	
9	Win	9–0	Jorge Romero	TKO	4 (8)	1 Mar 2002	Coliseo Guillermo Angulo, Carolina, Puerto Rico	
8	Win	8–0	Mike Thomas	UD	8	11 Jan 2002	Coliseo Héctor Solá Bezares, Caguas, Puerto Rico	
7	Win	7–0	Jorge Romero	UD	8	28 Oct 2001	Ponce, Puerto Rico	
6	Win	6–0	Alberto Rossel	UD	8	26 Aug 2001	El Hotel & Casino, San Juan, Puerto Rico	
5	Win	5–0	Jose Manuel Ramirez	UD	6	1 Jul 2001	Pier 10 Arena, San Juan, Puerto Rico	
4	Win	4–0	Iran Ethridge	KO	1 (4), 1:37	20 May 2001	San Juan, Puerto Rico	
3	Win	3–0	Benjamin Escobia	UD	4	29 Apr 2001	Club Amazura, Jamaica, New York, U.S.	
2	Win	2–0	Arturo Velazquez	UD	4	25 Mar 2001	Greyhound Park, Phoenix, Arizona, U.S.	
1	Win	1–0	Sergio Diaz	TKO	1 (4), 2:43	17 Feb 2001	MGM Grand Garden Arena, Paradise, Nevada, U.S.	

== Titles in boxing ==
=== Major world titles ===
- WBO mini flyweight champion (105 lbs)
- WBO flyweight champion (112 lbs)

=== The Ring magazine titles ===
- The Ring flyweight champion (112 lbs)

=== Regional/International titles ===
- NABO mini flyweight champion (105 lbs)
- WBO Latino mini flyweight champion (105 lbs)

=== Honorary titles ===
- WBO Super Champion

== See also ==
- List of WBO world champions
- List of Puerto Ricans
- Boxing at the 2000 Summer Olympics
- List of Puerto Rican boxing world champions
- Boxing in Puerto Rico

Puerto Ricans in the International Boxing Hall of Fame

Number	Name	Year inducted	Notes
1	Carlos Ortíz	1991	World Jr. Welterweight Champion 1959 June 12- 1960, September 1, WBA Lightweight Champion 1962 Apr 21 – 1965 Apr 10, WBC Lightweight Champion 1963 Apr 7 – 1965 Apr 10, WBC Lightweight Champion 1965 Nov 13 – 1968 Jun 29.
2	Wilfred Benítez	1994	The youngest world champion in boxing history. WBA Light Welterweight Champion 1976 Mar 6 – 1977, WBC Welterweight Champion 1979 Jan 14 – 1979 Nov 30, WBC Light Middleweight Champion.
3	Wilfredo Gómez	1995	WBC Super Bantamweight Champion 1977 May 21 – 1983, WBC Featherweight Champion 1984 Mar 31 – 1984 Dec 8, WBA Super Featherweight Champion 1985 May 19 – 1986 May 24.
4	José "Chegui" Torres	1997	Won a silver medal in the junior middleweight at the 1956 Olympic Games. Undisputed Light Heavyweight Champion 1965 Mar 30 – 1966 Dec 16
5	Sixto Escobar	2002	Puerto Rico's first boxing champion. World Bantamweight Champion 15 Nov 1935– 23 Sep 1937, World Bantamweight Champion 20 Feb 1938– Oct 1939
6	Edwin Rosario	2006	Ranks #36 on the list of "100 Greatest Punchers of All Time." according to Ring Magazine. WBC Lightweight Champion 1983 May 1 – 1984 Nov 3, WBA Lightweight Champion 1986 Sep 26 – 1987 Nov 21, WBA Lightweight Champion 199 Jul 9 – 1990 Apr 4, WBA Light Welterweight Champion 1991 Jun 14 – 1992 Apr 10.
7	Pedro Montañez	2007	92 wins out of 103 fights. Never held a title.
8	Joe Cortez	2011	The first Puerto Rican boxing referee to be inducted into the Boxing Hall of Fame
9	Herbert "Cocoa Kid" Hardwick	2012	Member of boxing's "Black Murderers' Row". World Colored Welterweight Championship - June 11, 1937 to August 22, 1938; World Colored Middleweight Championship - January 11, 1940 until the title went extinct in the 1940s; World Colored Middleweight Championship - January 15, 1943 until the title went extinct in the 1940s
10	Félix "Tito" Trinidad	2014	Captured the IBF welterweight crown in his 20th pro bout. Won the WBA light middleweight title from David Reid in March 2000 and later that year unified titles with a 12th-round knockout against IBF champ Fernando Vargas. In 2001 became a three-division champion.
11	Héctor "Macho" Camacho	2016	First boxer to be recognized as a septuple champion in history (counting championships from minor sanctioning bodies). WBC Super Featherweight Championship - August 7, 1983 – 1984, WBC Lightweight Championship - August 10, 1985 – 1987, WBO Light Welterweight Champion - March 6, 1989 – February 23, 1991, WBO Light Welterweight Champion - May 18, 1991–1992.
12	Mario Rivera Martino	2019	First Puerto Rican boxing sports writer to be inducted into the International Boxing Hall of Fame. He served Puerto Rican boxing for more than 50 years as a writer and eventual commissioner.
13	Miguel Cotto	2022	He is a multiple-time world champion, and the first Puerto Rican boxer to win world titles in four weight classes, from light welterweight to middleweight. In 2007 and 2009,

= Indicates the person is no longer alive

Sporting positions
Regional boxing titles
New title	WBO–NABO mini flyweight champion 22 Nov 2002 – 3 May 2003; Won world title	Vacant Title next held by Wilfredo Mendez
Vacant Title last held by Luis Alberto Rios	WBO Latino mini flyweight champion 29 Oct 2011 – Jan 2012; Vacated	Vacant Title next held by Carlos Buitrago
World boxing titles
Preceded by Eduardo Ray Marquez	WBO mini flyweight champion 3 May 2003 – 25 August 2007; Vacated	Vacant Title next held by Donnie Nietes
Preceded by Hugo Cázares	WBO light flyweight champion 25 August 2007 – 28 August 2010	Succeeded by Giovani Segura
Preceded by Hugo Cázares	The Ring light flyweight champion 25 August 2007 – 28 August 2010	Succeeded by Giovani Segura
Honorary boxing titles
Non-transferable title	WBO Super champion May 2006 – 25 August 2007	Non-transferable title
Awards
Previous: Juan Manuel Márquez vs. Juan Díaz	The Ring Fight of the Year vs. Giovani Segura; 2010	Next: Andre Berto vs. Victor Ortiz
