= Arnulfo Obando (boxing coach) =

Nicaraguan boxing coach

Personal information
- Birth name: Arnulfo Obando
- Nationality: Nicaragua
- Born: 1962; Nicaragua
- Died: 10 November 2016
- Occupation: Boxing trainer

Arnulfo Obando (1962 – 10 November 2016) was a boxing coach from Nicaragua. His most notable boxer was Román González, whom he coached from 2010 to his death in 2016. He was one of five nominated for Trainer of the Year by The Ring magazine in 2015 but the award went to Joe Gallagher.
