= Omar Salado =

Mexican boxer (born 1980)

Personal information
- Nickname: Tijuana Killer
- Born: Omar Alejandro Salado Fuentes; 15 February 1980 (age 46) Acapulco, Guerrero, Mexico
- Height: 1.68 m (5 ft 6 in)
- Weight: Bantamweight; Super Flyweight; Flyweight

Boxing career
- Reach: 174 cm (69 in)
- Stance: Orthodox

Boxing record
- Total fights: 36
- Wins: 24
- Win by KO: 13
- Losses: 9
- Draws: 2
- No contests: 1

Omar Alejandro Salado Fuentes (born 15 February 1980) is a Mexican professional boxer who is the former WBA Fedelatin super flyweight champion.

== Professional career ==
=== IBF Light Flyweight Championship ===
On 4 August 2006 Salado had a draw against IBF Light Flyweight Champion, Ulises Solís. He then went on to beat future World Champion, Gilberto Keb Baas.

=== WBA Light Flyweight Championship ===
In July 2011, Omar lost to WBA Light Flyweight Champion, Román González.

== Professional boxing record ==
36 fights	24 wins	9 losses
By knockout	15	8
By decision	9	1
Draws	2	
No contests	1	

No.	Result	Record	Opponent	Type	Round, time	Date	Location	Notes
36	Loss	24–9–2 (1)	Kōki Kameda	KO	4 (10), 2:21	1 November 2014	UIC Pavilion, Chicago, Illinois, U.S.	
35	Loss	24–8–2 (1)	Édgar Sosa	RTD	4 (8), 3:00	24 May 2014	Auditorio Municipal, Tijuana, Mexico	
34	Loss	24–7–2 (1)	Moisés Fuentes	TKO	7 (10), 2:26	22 November 2013	Forum Tecate, Tijuana, Mexico	
33	Win	24–6–2 (1)	Rogelio Espinoza	TKO	2 (8), 1:36	17 May 2013	Club de Leones, Guasave, Mexico	
32	Loss	23–6–2 (1)	Giovani Segura	TKO	9 (10)	23 February 2013	Gimnasio del Estado, Hermosillo, Mexico	
31	NC	23–5–2 (1)	Jonathan González	NC	1 (10), 1:13	2 February 2013	Coliseo Rubén Rodríguez, Bayamón, Puerto Rico	González unable to continue after an unintentional rabbit punch
30	Loss	23–5–2	Glenn Donaire	UD	12	16 March 2012	Auditorio Plaza Condesa, Mexico City, Mexico	For vacant WBC Latino super-flyweight title
29	Win	23–4–2	Ramón Peña González	TKO	3 (10)	18 March 2012	Auditorio Municipal, Zumpango, Mexico	
28	Loss	22–4–2	Román González	TKO	7 (12), 0:48	16 July 2011	Plaza de Toros, Cancún, Mexico	For WBA light-flyweight title
27	Win	22–3–2	Óscar Perales	KO	1	19 November 2010	Deportivo Tlalli, Tlalnepantla de Baz, Mexico	
26	Loss	21–3–2	Juan José Francisco Márquez Solano	TKO	6 (10)	19 June 2010	Cortijo San Felipe, San Pedro, Mexico	
25	Loss	21–2–2	Rafael Concepción	TKO	12 (12), 0:49	5 September 2009	Roberto Durán Arena, Panama City, Panama	For vacant WBA interim flyweight title
24	Win	21–1–2	Jorge Babuca Watanabe	TKO	1 (4), 1:56	22 May 2009	Terraza del Sol del Parque Vicente Guerrero, Mexicali, Mexico	
23	Win	20–1–2	José Albuquerque	UD	8	28 November 2008	DoubleTree Hotel, Ontario, California, U.S.	
22	Loss	19–1–2	Julio César Miranda	TKO	5 (12), 1:57	17 May 2008	Auditorio Centenario, Gómez Palacio, Mexico	
21	Win	19–0–2	Orlando García Guerrero	KO	2 (10)	28 March 2008	Arena Adolfo López Mateos, Tlalnepantla de Baz, Mexico	
20	Win	18–0–2	José Luis Trejo	TKO	2 (8), 2:50	20 October 2007	Autodromo de Go Karts, Cancún, Mexico	
19	Win	17–0–2	Branni Guerrero	TKO	3 (10), 2:25	13 August 2007	El Foro, Tijuana, Mexico	
18	Win	16–0–2	Gilberto Keb Baas	UD	12	30 April 2007	El Foro, Tijuana, Mexico	
17	Draw	15–0–2	Ulises Solís	MD	12	4 August 2006	Palenque del Hipódromo de Agua Caliente, Tijuana, Mexico	For IBF light-flyweight title
16	Win	15–0–1	Jorge Romero	KO	3 (12), 0:37	6 October 2005	El Foro, Tijuana, Mexico	Won vacant WBA Fedelatin super-flyweight title
15	Win	14–0–1	Eduardo Morales	TKO	6 (10), 2:49	8 July 2005	El Foro, Tijuana, Mexico	
14	Win	13–0–1	Francisco Paredes	UD	10	8 April 2005	Orleans Hotel & Casino, Paradise, Nevada, U.S.	
13	Win	12–0–1	Francisco Soto	UD	4	19 November 2004	Orleans Hotel & Casino, Paradise, Nevada, U.S.	
12	Win	11–0–1	José Luis Cárdenas	UD	6	3 September 2004	Gold Coast Hotel and Casino, Paradise, Nevada, U.S.	
11	Win	10–0–1	Juan Javier Lagos	MD	6	9 July 2004	Gold Coast Hotel and Casino, Paradise, Nevada, U.S.	
10	Win	9–0–1	Francisco Soto	UD	4	28 May 2004	Orleans Hotel & Casino, Paradise, Nevada, U.S.	
9	Win	8–0–1	Francisco Soto	UD	6	23 April 2004	Orleans Hotel & Casino, Paradise, Nevada, U.S.	
8	Win	7–0–1	José Tamayo González	TKO	4 (4)	16 February 2004	Salon Las Pulgas, Tijuana, Mexico	
7	Win	6–0–1	Jesús Valadez	UD	4	21 November 2003	Orleans Hotel & Casino, Paradise, Nevada, U.S.	
6	Win	5–0–1	Omar Rojas	TKO	1 (4)	8 September 2003	Discoteca Baby Rock, Tijuana, Mexico	
5	Draw	4–0–1	Fernando Hernández	PTS	4	20 June 2003	Palenque del Hipódromo de Agua Caliente, Tijuana, Mexico	
4	Win	4–0	Hugo Jiménez	TKO	4	24 March 2003	Tijuana, Baja California, Mexico	
3	Win	3–0	Filiberto Andrade	RTD	4 (6), 3:00	24 February 2003	Salon Las Pulgas, Tijuana, Mexico	
2	Win	2–0	Luis Villareal	TKO	3 (6)	6 December 2002	San Luis Río Colorado, Sonora, Mexico	
1	Win	1–0	Marco Antonio Sánchez	TKO	3	1 November 2002	Palenque del Parque Vicente Guerrero, Mexicali, Mexico	
