= Canelo Álvarez vs. Gennady Golovkin II =

2018 professional boxing match

Final Judgment
- Date: September 15, 2018
- Venue: T-Mobile Arena; Paradise, Nevada, United States
- Title(s) on the line: WBA (Super), WBC, IBO, vacant The Ring/TBRB and lineal middleweight titles

Tale of the tape
Boxer	Gennady Golovkin	Saúl Álvarez
Nickname	GGG	Canelo ("Cinnamon")
Hometown	Karagandy, Karaganda Region, Kazakhstan	Guadalajara, Jalisco, Mexico
Purse	$4,000,000	$5,000,000
Pre-fight record	38–0–1 (34 KO)	49–1–2 (34 KO)
Age	36 years, 5 months	28 years, 1 month
Height	5 ft 10 1/2 in (179 cm)	5 ft 8 in (173 cm)
Weight	159 3/5 lb (72 kg)	159 2/5 lb (72 kg)
Style	Orthodox	Orthodox
Recognition	WBA (Super), WBC, and IBO; Middleweight Champion; The Ring/TBRB; No. 1 Ranked Middleweight; The Ring No. 1 ranked pound-for-pound fighter	WBA/WBC; No. 1 Ranked Middleweight; 2-division world champion

Result
- Álvarez wins via 12-round majority decision (114–114, 115–113, 115–113)

Canelo Álvarez vs. Gennady Golovkin II billed as Final Judgment, was a professional boxing rematch between Canelo Álvarez and Gennady Golovkin which took place at T-Mobile Arena in Paradise, Nevada on September 15, 2018. Alvarez won by majority decision.

The fight was originally scheduled to take place on May 5, 2018. However, in March 2018, two months prior to the fight, Álvarez failed a drug test for clenbuterol and was suspended by the Nevada Athletic Commission for six months. Álvarez formally withdrew from the fight, but renegotiated the rematch to occur in September after his suspension lapsed.

The bout was named "Fight of the Year 2018" by The Ring magazine.

== Background ==
The world's two top middleweights had collided the previous September and had fought a high quality contest that ended with a controversial split draw after the full 12 rounds. However, with pundits and fans making cases for both fighters having won the bout, it was not so much the result of the draw that caused the controversy but rather the 118–110 scorecard in favor of Canelo by judge Adalaide Byrd, which was in stark contrast to the scorecards of 115–113 for Golovkin by Dave Moretti and the 114–114 even score by Don Trella.

Immediately after the controversial ending, talks began for a rematch between Álvarez and Golovkin. Álvarez stated he would next fight in May 2018, whereas Golovkin was open to fighting in December 2017. ESPN reported that Álvarez, who only had the rematch clause in his contract, must activate it within three weeks of their fight. On September 19, Golden Boy Promotions president Eric Gomez told ESPN that everyone on their side was interested in the rematch and they would hold discussions with Tom Loeffler in the next coming days. Ringtv reported that the negotiations would begin on September 22. On September 24, Gomez said the rematch would likely take place in the first week of May 2018, or if a deal could be worked, the fight could take place as early as March.

Despite ongoing negotiations for the rematch, at the 55th annual convention in Baku, Azerbaijan on October 2, the WBC officially ordered a rematch. Golden Boy president Eric Gomez told ESPN, "Regardless of if they did or didn't order the rematch, we are going to try to make it happen. We'll do whatever it takes to make it happen." On November 7, Eric Gomez indicated the negotiations were going well and Álvarez would make a decision in regards to the rematch in the coming weeks. It was believed that Golden Boy would wait until after David Lemieux and Billy Joe Saunders fought for the latter's WBO title on December 16, 2017, before making a decision. On November 15, Eddie Hearn, promoter of Daniel Jacobs stated that he approached Tom Loeffler regarding a possible rematch between Golovkin and Jacobs if the Álvarez-Golovkin rematch fails to take place.

On December 20, Eric Gomez announced that the negotiations were close to being finalized after Álvarez gave Golden Boy the go-ahead to write up the contracts. On January 29, 2018 HBO finally announced the rematch would take place on May 5 on the Cinco de Mayo weekend. Both fighters claimed that this time the judges would not be needed, with both men promising to knock the other out. The venue for the rematch was not confirmed until February 22, Madison Square Garden in New York City had been in the running to host the event, but it was eventually decided that the stage would be the same as the first fight, the T-Mobile Arena in Las Vegas. According to the WBC, unlike the first bout, Álvarez would fight for their title.

=== Cancellation ===
The fate of the rematch was put in jeopardy on March 5, 2018, when Álvarez failed two random urine tests, collected on February 17 and 20, for the banned substance clenbuterol. The Nevada Athletic Commission (NAC) opened an investigation, and Álvarez was temporarily suspended on March 23, 2018—pending a hearing on April 10. In the hearing, Álvarez would face the possibility a suspension of up to one year. Loeffler stated that Golovkin intended to fight on May 5, regardless of his opponent. Former two-time light middleweight champion Demetrius Andrade made an offer to fight if Álvarez received a long-term suspension, as well as IBF #1 contender Sergiy Derevyanchenko.

The next day, NAC chief Bob Bennett filed a formal doping complaint against Álvarez, which delayed the disciplinary hearing to the commission's next monthly meeting on April 18. ESPN.com writer Dan Rafael felt that this delay made it more uncertain that the fight would go ahead, while T-Mobile Arena had already announced the previous day that it would offer full refunds on tickets. On April 3, 2018, Alvarez officially withdrew from the fight. Gomez explained that "given the current regulations in Nevada, we have been advised, and it is unfortunate, that Canelo won't be cleared to fight in May. We are hopeful this matter will be resolved and we are hoping Canelo will be cleared so we can reschedule the fight for August or September."

=== Rescheduling ===
Álvarez was issued a six-month suspension by the Nevada Athletic Commission. As suspensions are retroactive from the date that the first failed test was collected (February 17, 2018), the suspension ended on August 17, 2018.

According to Golovkin on April 27, before he defeated Vanes Martirosyan, a fight with Álvarez in the fall was still a priority. During a conference call, he stated it was the 'biggest fight in the world and beneficial for all parties involved. Although Golovkin stated the rematch had a 10% chance of happening, Eric Gomez and Tom Loeffler agreed to meet and start negotiating after May 5. One of the main issues preventing the rematch to take place was the purse split. Álvarez wanted 65–35 in his favor, the same terms Golovkin agreed to initially, however Golovkin wanted a straight 50–50 split.

On June 6, Golovkin was stripped of his IBF world title due to not adhering to the IBF rules. The IBF granted Golovkin an exception to fight Martirosyan, although they would not sanction the fight, and ordered Golovkin's team to start negotiating a fight with mandatory challenger Sergiy Derevyanchenko by August 3, 2018. The IBF released a statement in detail. On June 7, Golovkin's team stated they would accept a 55–45 split in favor of Álvarez. The split in the initial rematch negotiations, Golovkin accepted a 65–35 split in favor of Álvarez. On June 12, Golden Boy gave Golovkin a 24-hour deadline to accept a 57½–42½ split in Álvarez's favor or they would explore other fights. At this time, Golden Boy were already in light negotiations with Eddie Hearn for a fight against Daniel Jacobs instead. At the same time, Loeffler was working closely with Frank Warren to match Saunders with Golovkin for the end of August.

On June 13, 2018, it was announced that Álvarez and Golovkin had finalized a deal to hold the rematch September 15, 2018, at T-Mobile Arena. Although it went past a negotiation deadline imposed by Golden Boy, it was reported that an unknown "tweak" employed by MGM Resorts International executives was a "Hail Mary" that had reinvigorated the negotiations. Golovkin revealed to ESPN he agreed to 45%. Álvarez started training for the bout on June 14 and stated his intention to apply for his boxing license on August 18. It was confirmed that both boxers would not physically come face to face with each other until fight week. A split-screen press conference took place on July 3.

On September 3, due to a majority vote of the panel, the vacant Ring magazine middleweight title would be contested for in the bout. Doug Fischer wrote, "We posed the question to the Ratings Panel, which, in a landslide, voted in favor of the magazine's 160-pound championship being up for grabs when the two stars clash at the T-Mobile Arena in Las Vegas."

=== Weigh-in ===
The weigh-in took place at the T-Mobile Arena in front of 9,000 fans. Golovkin took to the digital scale first and weighed 159.6 pounds. Álvarez weighed slightly lighter at 159.4 pounds. The traditional face-off was not without controversy, as this was the first time the two boxers had been face to face during the build up, with both camps trading insults. Golovkin was calm and collected, however, Álvarez went straight in to the face-off getting as close as he could before both camps intervened, cutting the face-off short. For the WBO junior middleweight title fight, Brandon Cook weighed 153.2 pounds and Jaime Munguia came in at the 154-pound limit. There was also controversy at the David Lemieux-Gary O'Sullivan face-off. Lemieux weighed 160 pounds and O'Sullivan weighed 159.2 pounds. During the face-off, O'Sullivan hung his arm out long in Lemieux's face, which Lemieux did not take kindly to. The two boxers were then separated. Román González weighed 114.8 pounds for his 10-round super flyweight bout with Moisés Fuentes, who himself had to strip and weighed 116 pounds.

=== Fight purses ===
According to the Nevada State Athletic Commission, Alvarez would earn an official purse of $5 million and Golovkin was to make a $4 million purse. It was reported with profits of the PPV, Alvarez would potentially earn around $40 million and Golovkin could earn $30 million.

Guaranteed base purses

- Canelo Álvarez ($5 million) vs. Gennady Golovkin ($4 million)
- Jaime Munguia ($250,000) vs. Brandon Cook ($30,000)
- David Lemieux ($200,000) vs. Gary O'Sullivan ($400,000)
- Román González ($200,000) vs. Moisés Fuentes ($35,000)

== The fight ==
In front of a sell out crowd of 21,965, the fight was again not without controversy as Álvarez defeated Golovkin via majority decision after 12 rounds. Judges Dave Moretti and Steve Weisfeld scored the bout 115–113 in favor of Álvarez and judge Glenn Fieldman scored it 114–114. The result was disputed by fans, pundits and media. Of the 18 media outlets scoring the bout, 10 ruled in favor of Golovkin, 7 scored it a draw, while 1 scored the bout for Álvarez. The scorecards showed how close the bout was, with the judges splitting eight rounds. After 9 rounds, all three judges had their scores reading 87–84 for Álvarez.

The fight was much different to the first bout in terms of action. Álvarez, who was described by Golovkin's team as a "runner", altered his style and became more aggressive. The first round had Canelo and Golovkin starting more cautiously than in the first fight, attempting to figure out each style. Both fighters made adjustments in their strategies for the rematch. Canelo fought more aggressively, pressing forward and landing effective counter punches. Golovkin, known for his relentless pressure and power punching, tried to control the pace of the fight but found himself unable to dominate Canelo as he did in their first encounter. Golovkin attempted to establish his jab as Canelo would throw mostly power punches. Canelo would win the next 2 rounds on each scorecard, landing the harder more explosive shots to the body and head while being aggressive, on the other hand, Golovkin still had not established his jab yet and was on the running side. The next 2 rounds had Golovkin be more active, particularly in round 4 throwing and landing more punches than the Mexican. In rounds 6,7 and 8 Canelo would take control of the fight again, landing harder punches while Golovkin had trouble with the more aggressive style of Canelo. The tide turned in rounds 9–11 as Canelo seemed to tire out, becoming less active while a more fresh Golovkin stunned Canelo multiple times. The 10th round had Canelo start the round strong but Golovkin landed the hardest punch of the fight, hurting Canelo, but Álvarez showed good defense, dodging a load of power punches from Golovkin. In round 11, a stunned Canelo would lose his aggression, backing up to the ropes while Golovkin seemed strong, having his best round of the fight. The final round was up to grabs on the scorecards, each judge having Canelo up 105–104. Both men slugged it out, landing as many power punches as they could. The final decision had Canelo winning 115–113 on 2 cards as one judge had it 114–114. Álvarez made good use of his body attacks, landing 46 compared to Golovkin's 6 landed. CompuBox stats showed that Golovkin landed 234 of 879 punches thrown (27%) and Álvarez landed 202 of his 622 punches (33%). Golovkin outlanded Álvarez in eight of the rounds, while Álvarez landed more power punches in nine of the rounds.

== Aftermath ==
In the post-fight interviews, through a translator, Álvarez said, "I showed my victory with facts. He was the one who was backing up. I feel satisfied because I gave a great fight. It was a clear victory." He continued, "That was a great fight. But in the end, it was a victory for Mexico. And again, it was an opportunity. And I want to shout out to my opponent, the best in the sport of boxing. I am a great fighter, and I showed it tonight. If the people want another round, I’ll do it again. But for right now, I will enjoy time with my family.” The outcome of the rematch sparked further debate among boxing fans and analysts. Some felt Canelo's victory was well-deserved, while others believed Golovkin had once again been denied a rightful win. Despite the controversy, the rematch between Canelo and Golovkin remains one of the most significant fights in recent boxing history.

Golovkin did not take part in the post fight interview and made his way backstage where he received stitches for a cut over his right eye. He later responded to the defeat, "I'm not going to say who won tonight, because the victory belongs to Canelo, according to the judges. I thought it was a very good fight for the fans and very exciting. I thought I fought better than he did."

Golovkin's trainer Abel Sanchez, who was very critical of Álvarez following the first fight said, "We had a great fight, the one we expected the first time around. I had it close going into the 12th round. We had good judges, who saw it from different angles. I can't complain about the decision, but it's close enough to warrant a third fight. Canelo fought a great fight. Congratulations." Both fighters were open to a trilogy.

=== Reception ===
The fight generated a live gate of $23,473,500 from 16,732 tickets sold. This was lower than the first bout, however the fourth largest-grossing gates in Nevada boxing history. The fight sold 1.1 million PPV buys, lower than the first bout, however due to being priced at $84.95, it generated more revenue at around $94 million. In total, the fight grossed about $117 million in revenue.

== Fight card ==
Confirmed bouts:

Weight class		vs.		Type	Round	Time	Notes
Middleweight	Canelo Álvarez	def.	Gennady Golovkin (c)	MD	12/12		For WBA (Super), WBC, IBO, vacant The Ring, and lineal middleweight titles
Jr. Middleweight	Jaime Munguia (c)	def.	Brandon Cook	TKO	3/12	1:03	For WBO junior middleweight title
Middleweight	David Lemieux	def.	Gary O'Sullivan	KO	1/12	2:44
Super Flyweight	Román González	def.	Moisés Fuentes	KO	5/10	1:44

== Broadcasting ==
=== US distribution ===
The fight was available for $84.99 in HD on HBO PPV on all major cable and satellite providers in the United States, on the FITE TV streaming service, and on Ring TV. This was the last PPV fight aired on HBO before HBO ended their boxing coverage in November and both fighters signed contracts with DAZN.

Country	Broadcaster
Panama	RPC-TV
United Kingdom	BT Sport
United States	HBO PPV

== See also ==
- Canelo Álvarez vs. Gennady Golovkin
- Canelo Álvarez vs. Gennady Golovkin III

Preceded by vs. Gennady Golovkin	Canelo Álvarez's bouts September 15, 2018	Succeeded by vs. Rocky Fielding
Preceded by vs. Vanes Martirosyan	Gennady Golovkin's bouts September 15, 2018	Succeeded by vs. Steve Rolls
Awards
Preceded by Anthony Joshua vs. Wladimir Klitschko	The Ring Magazine Fight of the Year; 2018	Succeeded by Naoya Inoue vs. Nonito Donaire
