= Raúl García (boxer) =

Mexican boxer (born 1982)

Personal information
- Nickname: Rayito
- Born: Raul Garcia Hirales; 10 September 1982 (age 44) La Paz, Baja California Sur, Mexico
- Weight: Mini flyweight

Boxing career
- Stance: Southpaw

Boxing record
- Total fights: 43
- Wins: 38
- Win by KO: 23
- Losses: 4
- Draws: 1

Raúl "Rayito" García Hirales (born 10 September 1982) is a Mexican former professional boxer. He has held the IBF mini flyweight title from June 2008 until March 2010 and WBO mini flyweight title from April 2011 until October 2011. He is the twin brother of former WBO light flyweight champion Ramón García Hirales.

== Professional career ==
On 14 June 2008, he challenged Filipino IBF mini flyweight champion Florante Condes and defeated him by a 12-round split decision in La Paz, Mexico. He defended his IBF title four times. Garcia lost the IBF mini flyweight title against South African Nkosinathi Joyi on 26 March 2010 by a unanimous decision.

After losing his IBF title, Garcia went on to win the WBO interim mini flyweight title on 30 October 2010 by a split decision against Luis de la Rosa. He was scheduled to face Donnie Nietes on 12 March 2011 for the full championship, however, just two weeks prior to the fight date, Nietes announced that he would be vacating his world title and moving up in weight. Therefore, Garcia was promoted to full champion. On 30 May 2011, he successfully defended the title for the first time by third round tko against Rommel Asenjo. Garcia and his brother Ramón made history on this night when they became the first set of twin brothers to win world title fights on the same card.

== Professional boxing record ==
43 fights	38 wins	4 losses
By knockout	23	1
By decision	15	3
Draws	1	

No.	Result	Record	Opponent	Type	Round, time	Date	Location	Notes
43	Loss	38–4–1	(Philippines) Donnie Nietes	RTD	5 (12), 3:00	28 May 2016	La Salle Coliseum, Bacolod, Philippines	For WBO and The Ring light flyweight titles
42	Win	38–3–1	(Mexico) Jesus Hernandez	KO	3 (10)	5 December 2015	Auditorio Municipal, Cabo San Lucas, Mexico	
41	Win	37–3–1	(Mexico) Francisco Reyes	UD	10	20 March 2015	Auditorio Municipal, Cabo San Lucas, Mexico	
40	Win	36–3–1	(Mexico) Andres Garcia Guzman	UD	10	12 December 2014	Auditorio Municipal, Cabo San Lucas, Mexico	
39	Win	35–3–1	(Mexico) Job Solano	UD	10	12 September 2014	Arena California, La Paz, Mexico	
38	Win	34–3–1	(Mexico) Arcadio Salazar	KO	1 (?)	15 March 2014	Estadio de Beisbol, Los Cabos, Mexico	
37	Loss	33–3–1	(Mexico) Pedro Guevara	SD	12	30 March 2013	Estadio Francisco Carranza Limón, Guasave, Mexico	For vacant WBC Silver light flyweight title
36	Win	33–2–1	(Mexico) Sammy Gutiérrez	TKO	3 (10), 1:25	22 December 2012	Auditorio del Bicentenario, Morelia, Mexico	
35	Win	32–2–1	(Philippines) Michael Landero	TKO	3 (10), 1:49	3 March 2012	Auditorio Fausto Gutierrez Moreno, Tijuana, Mexico	
34	Win	31–2–1	(Mexico) Erik Ramirez	TKO	6 (10)	2 December 2011	Gimnasio Auditorio Jorge Campos, La Paz, Mexico	
33	Loss	30–2–1	(Mexico) Moisés Fuentes	SD	12	27 August 2011	Auditorio Benito Juarez, Guadalajara, Mexico	Lost WBO mini flyweight title
32	Win	30–1–1	(Philippines) Rommel Asenjo	TKO	3 (12), 2:52	30 April 2011	Foro Polanco, Mexico City, Mexico	Retained WBO mini flyweight title
31	Win	29–1–1	(Colombia) Luis de la Rosa	SD	12	30 October 2010	Centro de Convenciones, Cartagena, Colombia	Won vacant WBO interim mini flyweight title
30	Win	28–1–1	(Mexico) Samuel Garcia	TKO	7 (10)	4 September 2010	Gimnasio Auditorio del Centro, Ciudad Constitución, Mexico	
29	Loss	27–1–1	(South Africa) Nkosinathi Joyi	UD	12	26 March 2010	International Convention Centre, East London, South Africa	Lost IBF mini flyweight title
28	Win	27–0–1	(Mexico) Sammy Gutiérrez	MD	12	22 August 2009	Auditorio Unidad Deportiva, Los Cabos, Mexico	Retained IBF mini flyweight title
27	Win	26–0–1	(Colombia) Ronald Barrera	TKO	6 (12), 2:26	11 April 2009	Estadio de Beisbol Arturo C. Nahl, La Paz, Mexico	Retained IBF mini flyweight title
26	Win	25–0–1	(Venezuela) José Luis Varela	UD	12	13 December 2008	Gimnasio Medardo Meza Dominguez, Loreto, Mexico	Retained IBF mini flyweight title
25	Win	24–0–1	(Venezuela) José Luis Varela	UD	12	13 September 2008	Estadio de Beisbol Arturo C. Nahl, La Paz, Mexico	Retained IBF mini flyweight title
24	Win	23–0–1	(Philippines) Florante Condes	SD	12	14 June 2008	Estadio de Beisbol Arturo C. Nahl, La Paz, Mexico	Won IBF mini flyweight title
23	Win	22–0–1	(Colombia) Ronald Barrera	UD	12	29 February 2008	Estadio de Beisbol Arturo C. Nahl, La Paz, Mexico	
22	Win	21–0–1	(Mexico) Oscar Saturnino	UD	12	19 October 2007	Deportivo Corona, La Paz, Mexico	Retained Mexican mini flyweight title
21	Win	20–0–1	(Mexico) Noe Flores	KO	1 (10), 2:31	31 August 2007	Deportivo Corona, La Paz, Mexico	
20	Win	19–0–1	(Mexico) Sammy Gutiérrez	SD	12	15 June 2007	Estadio de Beisbol Arturo C. Nahl, La Paz, Mexico	Won Mexican mini flyweight title
19	Win	18–0–1	(Mexico) Jesus Iribe	TKO	8 (12)	16 March 2007	Estadio de Beisbol Arturo C. Nahl, La Paz, Mexico	Won WBC Mundo Hispano mini flyweight title
18	Win	17–0–1	(Mexico) Osvaldo Ibarra	KO	9 (10)	15 December 2006	Estadio de Beisbol Arturo C. Nahl, La Paz, Mexico	
17	Win	16–0–1	(Mexico) Noe Flores	TKO	1 (?)	1 December 2006	Estadio de Beisbol Arturo C. Nahl, La Paz, Mexico	
16	Win	15–0–1	(Mexico) Fred Heberto Valdez	KO	4 (12)	14 July 2006	La Paz, Mexico	
15	Draw	14–0–1	(Mexico) Sammy Gutiérrez	PTS	12	2 June 2006	Estadio de Beisbol Arturo C. Nahl, La Paz, Mexico	For Mexican mini flyweight title
14	Win	14–0	(Mexico) Jose Espinoza	KO	3 (10)	15 April 2006	Loreto, Mexico	
13	Win	13–0	(Mexico) Godofredo Valdez	UD	12	4 March 2006	Loreto, Mexico	
12	Win	12–0	(Mexico) Indalecio Meza	TKO	1 (12)	10 December 2005	Loreto, Mexico	
11	Win	11–0	(Mexico) Carlos Balmea	KO	3 (10)	15 October 2005	Loreto, Mexico	
10	Win	10–0	(Mexico) Godofredo Valdez	UD	10	16 September 2005	Loreto, Mexico	
9	Win	9–0	(Mexico) Leonardo Rodriguez	TKO	1 (10), 2:31	30 July 2005	Estadio de Beisbol Arturo C. Nahl, La Paz, Mexico	
8	Win	8–0	(Mexico) Edgar Arizmendi	KO	2 (8)	17 June 2005	La Paz, Mexico	
7	Win	7–0	(Mexico) Andres Garcia Guzman	UD	8	14 May 2005	Cabo San Lucas, Mexico	
6	Win	6–0	(Mexico) Edgar Ramos	KO	2 (8)	15 April 2005	La Paz, Mexico	
5	Win	5–0	(Mexico) Jose Espinoza	PTS	8	18 December 2004	La Paz, Mexico	
4	Win	4–0	(Mexico) Charly Valenzuela	TKO	4 (6), 2:07	3 December 2004	La Paz, Mexico	
3	Win	3–0	(Mexico) Carlos Garcia	KO	1 (4)	17 September 2004	La Paz, Mexico	
2	Win	2–0	(Mexico) Arnoldo Perez	KO	3 (4)	14 August 2004	La Paz, Mexico	
1	Win	1–0	(Mexico) Arnoldo Perez	KO	1 (4)	2 July 2004	La Paz, Mexico	

== See also ==
- List of Mini-flyweight boxing champions
- List of Mexican boxing world champions

Achievements
Preceded by Florante Condes	IBF mini flyweight champion 14 June 2008 - 26 March 2010	Succeeded by Nkosinathi Joyi
Vacant Title last held by Manuel Vargas	WBO mini flyweight champion Interim title 30 October 2010 - 25 February 2011; Promoted	Vacant Title next held by Merlito Sabillo
Preceded by Donnie Nietes; Vacated	WBO mini flyweight champion 28 February 2011 - 27 August 2011	Succeeded by Moisés Fuentes
