= Rommel Asenjo =

Filipino boxer

Personal information
- Nickname: Little Assassin
- Nationality: Filipino
- Born: Rommel L. Asenjo; August 19, 1988 (age 38) Pigcawayan, Cotabato, Philippines
- Height: 5 ft 2 in (1.57 m)
- Weight: Minimumweight (105 lb); Light flyweight (108 lb); Flyweight (112 lb)

Boxing career
- Reach: 62 in (157 cm)
- Stance: Southpaw

Boxing record
- Total fights: 39
- Wins: 32
- Win by KO: 24
- Losses: 7

Rommel Asenjo (born 19 August 1988) is a Filipino professional boxer. He is a former WBO Oriental minimumweight champion, as well as a two-time world title challenger. He is also known for his "exciting style which had seen him score a lot of early wins."

== Professional boxing career ==
Asenjo rose to prominence with an initial 17–2 record, primarily fighting in his home province of Cotabato. He won his first title on 23 May 2009, defeating Tanzanian fighter Sadiki Abdulazizi by way of first-round TKO for the WBO Oriental minimumweight belt. He won his next six fights (including one title defense) before receiving his first world title shot. On 30 April 2011, Asenjo travelled to Mexico City and challenged Raúl García for his WBO minimumweight title. García dropped him in the third round.

After six more consecutive wins back home, Asenjo returned to Mexico four years later to challenge WBA (Super) and WBO flyweight champion Juan Francisco Estrada, this time in Mérida. He was quickly dispatched by the Mexican after his corner threw in the towel in the third round when his right eye swelled up.

== Professional boxing record ==
32 Wins (24 knockouts, 8 decisions), 7 Losses (4 knockouts, 3 decisions)
Res.	Record	Opponent	Type	Rd., Time	Date	Location	Notes
Loss	32–7	(Mexico) Diego Monzalez	TKO	7 (10), 2:51	2023-05-09	(Philippines) F.L. Dy Coliseum, Cauayan City	
Loss	32–6	(Malaysia) Romel Maufis	UD	10	2022-02-05	(Philippines) LDB Sports Arena, Mangilag Sur, Candelaria	
Win	32–5	(Malaysia) Romel Maufis	TKO	2 (8), 0:46	2020-12-23	(Philippines) Almendras Gym, Davao City	
Win	31–5	(Malaysia) Romel Maufis	TKO	1 (10), 2:58	2016-10-15	(Philippines) Pigkawayan	
Win	30–5	(Philippines) Raymon Dayham	TKO	7 (8), 0:49	2016-08-27	(Philippines) Kidapawan City Gymnasium, Barangay Amas, Kidapawan City	
Loss	29–5	(Malaysia) Romel Maufis	TKO	1 (10), 1:48	2016-04-02	Auditorio BB, Mexico City	
Win	29–4	(Philippines) Lyster Jun Pronco	SD	10	2015-12-12	(Philippines) Almendras Gym, Davao City, Davao del Sur	
Win	28–4	(Philippines) Michael Rodriguez	UD	10	2015-06-26	(Philippines) Davao City Recreation Center, Davao City, Davao del Sur	
Loss	27–4	(Mexico) Juan Francisco Estrada	TKO	3 (12), 0:43	2015-03-28	(Mexico) Poliforum Zamna, Mérida, Yucatán	For WBA (Super) and WBO flyweight titles.
Win	27–3	(Philippines) Powell Balaba	MD	8	2014-10-11	(Philippines) Davao City Recreation Center, Davao City, Davao del Sur	
Win	26–3	(Philippines) Michael Borja	KO	1 (6), 0:52	2014-06-28	(Philippines) Almendras Gym, Davao City, Davao del Sur	
Win	25–3	(Philippines) Brobro Languido	KO	1 (6), 2:32	2013-09-11	(Philippines) Plaridel Municipal Gymnasium, Plaridel, Misamis Occidental	
Win	24–3	(Philippines) Jonathan Ricablanca	UD	6	2013-08-04	(Philippines) M'lang Municipal Gymnasium, M'lang, Cotabato	
Win	23–3	(Philippines) Jade Yagahon	KO	4 (10), 0:55	2012-02-02	(Philippines) Pigcawayan, Cotabato	
Win	22–3	(Philippines) John Rey Lauza	KO	2 (8), 0:34	2011-12-04	(Philippines) M'lang	
Win	21–3	(Philippines) Arnel Tadena	RTD	5 (10), 3:00	2011-10-07	(Philippines) 888 Chinatown Mall, Bacolod, Negros Occidental	
Loss	20–3	(Mexico) Raúl García	TKO	3 (12), 2:52	2011-04-30	Foro Polanco, Mexico City	For WBO minimumweight title.
Win	20–2	(Philippines) Ryan Rey Ponteras	UD	8	2011-02-26	(Philippines) Lagao Gym, General Santos, South Cotabato	
Win	19–2	(Philippines) Rodel Tejares	KO	1 (10), 2:38	2010-08-11	(Philippines) Magpet, Cotabato	
Win	18–2	(Philippines) Jetly Purisima	UD	12	2010-02-14	(Philippines) M'lang Municipal Plaza, M'lang, Cotabato	Retained WBO Oriental minimumweight title.
Win	17–2	(Philippines) Geboi Mansalayao	KO	3 (8), 1:06	2009-09-26	(Philippines) Midsayap, Cotabato	
Win	16–2	(Philippines) Jun Tasic	TKO	8 (8), 2:05	2009-08-09	(Philippines) Magpet Municipal Gymnasium, Magpet, Cotabato	
Win	15–2	(Philippines) Rocky Sardido	TKO	2 (8), 1:18	2009-07-04	(Philippines) Midsayap Municipal Gym, Midsayap, Cotabato	
Win	14–2	(Tanzania) Sadiki Abdulazizi	TKO	1 (12), 2:59	2009-05-23	(Philippines) Medina Gymnasium, Ozamiz, Misamis Occidental	Won vacant WBO Oriental minimumweight title.
Win	13–2	(Thailand) Wutisak Sithsoei	KO	1 (8), 0:34	2009-04-25	(Philippines) Cebu Coliseum, Cebu City, Cebu	
Win	12–2	(Philippines) Marlon Villanueva	TKO	3 (6), 2:23	2009-02-21	(Philippines) Cebu Coliseum, Cebu City, Cebu	
Win	11–2	(Philippines) Roel Honor	KO	4 (10), 2:05	2009-01-10	(Philippines) Makilala, Cotabato	
Win	10–2	(Philippines) Daryl Amoncio	TKO	2 (8), 1:25	2008-11-25	(Philippines) Midsayap Municipal Gym, Midsayap, Cotabato	
Win	9–2	(Thailand) Denchailek Sithsoei	KO	5 (10), 2:50	2008-10-19	(Philippines) Municipal Gymnasium, Pigcawayan, Cotabato	
Win	8–2	(Philippines) Roel Honor	UD	8	2008-08-09	(Philippines) Midsayap Municipal Gym, Midsayap, Cotabato	
Win	7–2	(Philippines) Jetly Purisima	MD	8	2008-06-21	(Philippines) Midsayap Municipal Gym, Midsayap, Cotabato	
Win	6–2	(Philippines) Rodel Tejares	TKO	2 (8), 1:11	2008-04-12	(Philippines) Magpet Municipal Gymnasium, Magpet, Cotabato	
Loss	5–2	(Thailand) Suriyan Sor Rungvisai	UD	6	2008-02-22	(Thailand) Tamaka Witthayakom School, Kanchanaburi, Kanchanaburi Province	
Win	5–1	(Philippines) Juan Purisima	TKO	4 (6)	2008-01-19	(Philippines) Midsayap, Cotabato	
Loss	4–1	(Philippines) Ronelle Ferreras	UD	6	2007-09-29	(Philippines) M'lang, Cotabato	
Win	4–0	(Philippines) Quilber Cailing	TKO	2 (6), 1:10	2007-08-10	(Philippines) Magpet Municipal Gym, Magpet, Cotabato	
Win	3–0	(Philippines) Noel Rosa	KO	3 (4), 2:59	2007-06-30	(Philippines) Barangay Amas, Kidapawan, Cotabato	
Win	2–0	(Philippines) Arvin Calledo	KO	1 (4), 1:41	2007-04-28	(Philippines) Kidapawan, Cotabato	
Win	1–0	(Philippines) Ronnie Dumaran	TKO	1 (4), 2:15	2007-01-20	(Philippines) Notre Dame of Midsayap College Gym, Midsayap, Cotabato	
