= Pharaoh's Casino =

Casino in Nicaragua

- Interactive map of Pharaoh's Casino
- Location: Managua, Nicaragua; 12°8′50″N 86°11′8″W

Pharaoh's Casino is a casino on the Carretera Masaya in Managua, Nicaragua.

== Facilities ==
The casino has a total of 156 (once had 140) slot machines and 10 table games. Blackjack, Caribbean Stud Poker, American Roulette, Modern Slot Machines, Video Poker, 77 live gaming positions including a high limit VIP salon and modern slot and video poker machines are amongst the gambling facilities in Pharaoh's Casino.

The casino also has a Texas Hold'em Poker room. The room features 3 tables, including one reserved for cash games only. $2-$4 No Limit Texas Hold'em cash games take place nightly, as does a low-stakes tournament ($10 buy-in).

The casino also features a Sport Book room, with a number of flat-screen televisions for event viewing.

All areas of the casino allow smoking.

== Gallo pinto ==
The casino is noted as being the place in which the world record was set in organizing the largest gallo pinto with 22,200 dishes served. The gallo pinto has been held at Pharaoh's Casino on September 15 since 2002. The money raised by the event goes to the El Pajarito Azul Home charity.
