= Carlos Melo =

Panamanian boxer

Personal information
- Nickname: Shangai
- Born: Carlos Bolívar Melo; September 22, 1982 (age 43) Panama City, Panama
- Height: 5 ft 2.5 in (1.59 m)
- Weight: Light flyweight

Boxing career
- Stance: Orthodox

Boxing record
- Total fights: 47
- Wins: 22
- Win by KO: 2
- Losses: 22
- Draws: 3

Carlos Bolívar Melo (born September 22, 1982) is a Panamanian former professional boxer who competed from 2001 to 2017 and challenged for the WBC light flyweight title in 2008.

His trainers have included Héctor Rangel and María Toto.
