= Junto Nakatani =

Japanese boxer (born 1998)

Junto Nakatani 中谷潤人
Personal information
- Nickname: Big Bang
- Born: 2 January 1998 (age 28) Inabe, Mie, Japan
- Height: 5 ft 8 in (173 cm)
- Weight: Flyweight; Super flyweight; Bantamweight; Super bantamweight

Boxing career
- Reach: 68.5 in (174 cm)
- Stance: Southpaw

Boxing record
- Total fights: 33
- Wins: 32
- Win by KO: 24
- Losses: 1

Junto Nakatani (中谷潤人, Nakatani Junto; born 2 January 1998) is a Japanese professional boxer. He has held world championships in three weight classes, including the World Boxing Organization (WBO) flyweight title from 2020 to 2022 and the WBO junior bantamweight title in 2023, the unified World Boxing Council (WBC) and International Boxing Federation (IBF) between 2024 and 2025, and the Ring Magazine bantamweight title in 2025. He challenged for the undisputed world super-bantamweight title in 2026.

== Early life ==
Nakatani's father sent him to karate school when he was in third grade because he was always playing video games. He later transitioned to boxing, where he found greater success due to the sport's weight classes.

== Amateur career ==
Nakatani's amateur career was brief but notable, highlighted by winning the under-15 National Championships. He had an amateur record of 14 wins (10 KOs) and 2 losses. At age 17, he turned professional after receiving his C-Class boxing license.

== Professional career ==
=== Flyweight ===
==== Early career ====
Nakatani made his professional debut on 26 April 2015, scoring a first-round technical knockout (TKO) victory over Junichi Itoga at the Industrial Hall in Gifu, Japan. He would go on to amass a 9–0 record, and was ranked in the flyweight rankings by the JBC following his victory over Masamichi Yabuki, a boxer who would go on to win multiple world titles.

Nakatani was scheduled to fight Atiwit Munyapho on 19 February 2017, in the opening round of the Japanese flyweight Youth Tournament. He won the fight by a second-round technical knockout. He beat Joel Taduran by a fourth-round technical knockout. Then faced future world champion Seigo Yuri Akui in the tournament finals. He beat Akui by a sixth-round technical knockout. He was further named the tournament MVP.

Nakatani won his next four fights, before being scheduled to fight Naoki Mochizuki for the vacant Japanese flyweight title. He won the fight by a ninth-round technical knockout. He fought Philip Luis Cuerdo on 1 June 2019, and won the fight by a first-round knockout.

On 23 July 2019, Nakatani vacated the Japanese flyweight title.

Nakatani was scheduled to fight the former IBF and IBO light flyweight champion Milan Melindo on 5 October 2019. He beat Melindo by a sixth-round technical knockout.

==== Nakatani vs. Magramo ====
Nakatani was scheduled to fight Giemel Magramo for the vacant WBO flyweight title on 6 November 2020 at the Korakuen Hall. The bout was originally set for April but due to the COVID-19 pandemic was postponed and rescheduled thrice. Nakatani entered the bout as the favorite to win the title. Nakatani dominated the bout, punishing his opponent from range, and landing with more power when Magramo closed in. Nakatani won the fight by an eight-round technical knockout. The referee waved the fight off early on in the round, as Magramo was knocked down with a combination of punches, although Magramo managed to beat the count.

==== Nakatani vs. Acosta ====
Nakatani was scheduled to make his first title defense against the former WBO light flyweight champion Ángel Acosta on 29 May 2021, in his native Japan. Increasingly strict COVID-19 regulations imposed by the Japanese government and international travel issues forced the postponement of the bout, with Nakatani's management tentatively announcing the fight for late May or early June. On 26 May 2021, WBO scheduled a 1 June purse bid with a minimum offer of $80,000. That purse bid was canceled on 2 June 2021, as an agreement was made that Nakatani’s promoter, Teiken Promotions, would handle the negotiations. The fight was scheduled for 10 September 2021, in Tucson, Arizona. Nakatani won the fight by a fourth-round technical knockout. Nakatani broke Acosta's nose in the opening round of the bout, and both the referee and the ringside physician warned Acosta that the fight would be stopped if his nose suffered more damage. The fight was finally stopped near the end of the fourth round, at the 2:28 minute mark.

==== Nakatani vs. Yamauchi ====
Nakatani was booked to make his second WBO flyweight title defense against the reigning WBO Asia Pacific flyweight titleholder Ryota Yamauchi on 9 April 2022. The bout was scheduled for the undercard of the Ryōta Murata and Gennadiy Golovkin middleweight unification bout, and took place at the Saitama Super Arena in Saitama, Japan. He won the fight by an eight-round technical knockout, forcing referee Katsuhiko Nakamura to stop the bout with a flurry of punches at the 2:20 minute mark. Nakatani was leading on the scorecards at the time of the stoppage, with all three judges' having him up 70–63.

=== Super flyweight ===
==== Nakatani vs. Rodríguez Jr. ====
Nakatani is going to face the former WBO super flyweight title challenger Francisco Rodríguez Jr. in a super flyweight bout on 1 November 2022. The fight took place on the undercard of the Hiroto Kyoguchi and Kenshiro Teraji title unification bout. Nakatani officially vacated his WBO flyweight title on 27 October. Nakatani won the fight by unanimous decision, with scores of 98–91, 97–92 and 99–90. Rodríguez Jr. was deducted a point in the seventh round for landing a low blow.

==== Nakatani vs. Moloney ====
On 1 January 2023, the reigning WBO super flyweight champion Kazuto Ioka was ordered by the sanctioning body to make a mandatory title defense against Nakatani. As Ioka vacated the title on 14 February to pursue a rematch with Joshua Franco, Nakatani was instead ordered to face Andrew Moloney for the vacant championship. The fight took place on 20 May 2023, at the MGM Grand Garden Arena in Las Vegas, Nevada. On the night, Nakatani dropped Moloney in the second round with a series of uppercuts. Nakatani scored another knockdown in the eleventh round, before scoring a one-punch knockout in the twelfth round to win the vacant WBO title. The knockout was later voted The Ring magazine Knockout of the Year.

==== Nakatani vs. Cortes ====
Nakatani was scheduled to make his first WBO super flyweight title defense against Argi Cortes on 18 September 2023, at the Ariake Arena in Tokyo, Japan. He dropped Cortes 3 times and won the fight by unanimous decision.

=== WBC Bantamweight Champion ===
==== Nakatani vs. Santiago ====
Nakatani was scheduled to fight Alexandro Santiago for the WBC bantamweight title on 24 February 2024. Nakatani won the fight and the championship by TKO in the 6th round.

==== Nakatani vs. Astrolabio ====
Nakatani was scheduled to make the first defense of his WBC bantamweight title against mandatory challenger Vincent Astrolabio at Ryōgoku Kokugikan in Tokyo, Japan on 20 July 2024. Nakatani won the fight and retained his title, by scoring bodyshot TKO in the first round.

==== Nakatani vs. Sor Chitpattana ====
Nakatani made the second defense of his WBC bantamweight title against Petch Sor Chitpattana on 14 October 2024 in Tokyo, Japan. He won the fight by a sixth-round technical knockout.

==== Nakatani vs. Cuellar ====
Nakatani was scheduled to make the third defense of his WBC bantamweight title against David Cuellar Contreras at Ariake Arena in Tokyo, Japan on 24 February 2025. Nakatani knocked down Cuellar two times and won the fight by knockout in the third round.

=== WBC and IBF Bantamweight Championship Unification ===
Holding the WBC bantamweight title, Nakatani faced the IBF bantamweight champion Ryosuke Nishida in the championship unification in Tokyo, Japan, on 8 June 2025. He won by stoppage when Nishida retired at the end of the sixth round due to an eye injury.

On 6 August 2025, Nakatani announced his intention to vacate his bantamweight titles and move up to super bantamweight.

=== Nakatani vs Hernandez ===
Making his super-bantamweight debut, Nakatani defeated Sebastian Hernandez by unanimous decision at Mohammed Abdo Arena in Riyadh, Saudi Arabia, on 27 December 2025.

==== Nakatani vs. Inoue ====
Nakatani faced off against the undisputed super-bantamweight champion Naoya Inoue on 2 May 2026, at the Tokyo Dome in Tokyo, Japan. Touted by the writers of the Associated Press and Yahoo News as the "biggest fight in Japanese boxing history", Nakatani lost to Inoue via unanimous decision with a scorecard of 116–112, 115–113, 116–112, and was subsequently handed his first loss in professional boxing. It was also reported after that during the fight, Nakatani fractured his left eye socket via an uppercut by Inoue in the 11th round of the fight.

== Professional boxing record ==
33 fights	32 wins	1 loss
By knockout	24	0
By decision	8	1

No.	Result	Record	Opponent	Type	Round, time	Date	Location	Notes
33	Loss	32–1	Naoya Inoue	UD	12	2 May, 2026	Tokyo Dome, Tokyo, Japan	For WBA (Super), WBC, IBF, WBO and The Ring super bantamweight titles
32	Win	32–0	Sebastian Hernandez	UD	12	27 Dec 2025	Mohammed Abdo Arena, Riyadh, Saudi Arabia	
31	Win	31–0	Ryosuke Nishida	RTD	6 (12), 3:00	8 Jun 2025	Ariake Colosseum, Tokyo, Japan	Retained WBC bantamweight title; Won IBF and vacant The Ring bantamweight titles
30	Win	30–0	David Cuellar Contreras	KO	3 (12), 2:55	24 Feb 2025	Ariake Arena, Tokyo, Japan	Retained WBC bantamweight title
29	Win	29–0	Petch Sor Chitpattana	TKO	6 (12), 2:59	14 Oct 2024	Ariake Arena, Tokyo, Japan	Retained WBC bantamweight title
28	Win	28–0	Vincent Astrolabio	KO	1 (12), 2:37	20 Jul 2024	Ryōgoku Kokugikan, Tokyo, Japan	Retained WBC bantamweight title
27	Win	27–0	Alexandro Santiago	TKO	6 (12), 1:12	24 Feb 2024	Ryōgoku Kokugikan, Tokyo, Japan	Won WBC bantamweight title
26	Win	26–0	Argi Cortes	UD	12	18 Sep 2023	Ariake Arena, Tokyo, Japan	Retained WBO junior-bantamweight title
25	Win	25–0	Andrew Moloney	KO	12 (12), 2:42	20 May 2023	MGM Grand Garden Arena, Paradise, Nevada, U.S.	Won vacant WBO junior-bantamweight title
24	Win	24–0	Francisco Rodríguez Jr.	UD	10	1 Nov 2022	Super Arena, Saitama, Japan	
23	Win	23–0	Ryota Yamauchi	TKO	8 (12), 2:20	9 Apr 2022	Super Arena, Saitama, Japan	Retained WBO flyweight title
22	Win	22–0	Ángel Acosta	TKO	4 (12), 2:28	10 Sep 2021	Casino del Sol, Tucson, Arizona, U.S.	Retained WBO flyweight title
21	Win	21–0	Giemel Magramo	TKO	8 (12), 2:10	6 Nov 2020	Korakuen Hall, Tokyo, Japan	Won vacant WBO flyweight title
20	Win	20–0	Milan Melindo	TKO	6 (10), 2:02	5 Oct 2019	Korakuen Hall, Tokyo, Japan	
19	Win	19–0	Philip Luis Cuerdo	KO	1 (10), 1:23	1 Jun 2019	Korakuen Hall, Tokyo, Japan	
18	Win	18–0	Naoki Mochizuki	TKO	9 (10), 0:23	2 Feb 2019	Korakuen Hall, Tokyo, Japan	Won vacant Japanese flyweight title
17	Win	17–0	Shun Kosaka	UD	8	6 Oct 2018	Korakuen Hall, Tokyo, Japan	
16	Win	16–0	Dexter Alimento	KO	3 (10), 0:36	7 Jul 2018	Korakuen Hall, Tokyo, Japan	
15	Win	15–0	Mario Andrade	TD	8 (10), 0:43	15 Apr 2018	Yokohama Arena, Yokohama, Japan	
14	Win	14–0	Jeronil Borres	KO	1 (8), 1:56	20 Jan 2018	Korakuen Hall, Tokyo, Japan	
13	Win	13–0	Seigo Yuri Akui	TKO	6 (8), 2:01	23 Aug 2017	Korakuen Hall, Tokyo, Japan	Won inaugural Japanese Youth flyweight title
12	Win	12–0	Yuma Kudo	MD	6	16 May 2017	Korakuen Hall, Tokyo, Japan	
11	Win	11–0	Joel Taduran	TKO	4 (6), 0:53	16 Apr 2017	Messe Mie, Tsu, Japan	
10	Win	10–0	Atiwit Munyapho	TKO	2 (6), 0:43	19 Feb 2017	Shinjuku Face, Tokyo, Japan	
9	Win	9–0	Masamichi Yabuki	UD	4	23 Dec 2016	Korakuen Hall, Tokyo, Japan	
8	Win	8–0	Daisuke Yamada	TKO	1 (5), 1:40	13 Nov 2016	Korakuen Hall, Tokyo, Japan	
7	Win	7–0	Satoshi Tanaka	RTD	2 (4), 3:00	4 Oct 2016	Korakuen Hall, Tokyo, Japan	
6	Win	6–0	Shu Muramatsu	TKO	2 (4), 0:15	27 Jul 2016	Korakuen Hall, Tokyo, Japan	
5	Win	5–0	Anirut Chomyong	TKO	1 (4), 1:43	28 Apr 2016	Korakuen Hall, Tokyo, Japan	
4	Win	4–0	Tetsuya Tomioka	TKO	3 (4), 2:17	28 Jan 2016	Korakuen Hall, Tokyo, Japan	
3	Win	3–0	Magnum Nishida	UD	4	22 Nov 2015	Shinjuku Face, Tokyo, Japan	
2	Win	2–0	Akira Kokubo	TKO	4 (4), 1:06	17 Jul 2015	Korakuen Hall, Tokyo, Japan	
1	Win	1–0	Junichi Itoga	TKO	1 (4), 1:33	26 Apr 2015	Industrial Hall, Gifu, Japan	

== Titles in boxing ==
=== Major world titles ===
- WBO flyweight champion (112 lbs)
- WBO super flyweight champion (115 lbs)
- WBC bantamweight champion (118 lbs)
- IBF bantamweight champion (118 lbs)

=== The Ring magazine titles ===
- The Ring bantamweight champion (118 lbs)

=== Regional/International titles ===
- Japanese Youth flyweight champion (112 lbs)
- Japanese flyweight champion (112 lbs)

== Boxing awards ==
- The Ring magazine Knockout of the Year: 2023
- ESPN Knockout of the Year: 2023
- CBS Sports Knockout of the Year: 2023
- Top Rank Knockout of the Year: 2023
- The Sweet Science (TSS) Knockout of the Year: 2023
- Japan Boxing Commission Best Knockout of the Year: 2024
- Japan Boxing Commission Best Technique of the Year: 2024, 2025
- Japan Boxing Commission Valuable Victory Award: 2023
- Japan Boxing Commission Distinguished Award: 2020, 2022
- Japan Boxing Commission Newcomer Award: 2019
- East Japan Boxing Association Fighting Spirit Award: February 2019
- Sagamihara City Cultural Sports Award: 2022

== See also ==
- List of male boxers
- Boxing in Japan
- List of Japanese boxing world champions
- List of southpaw stance boxers
- List of world flyweight boxing champions
- List of world super-flyweight boxing champions
- List of world bantamweight boxing champions
- List of The Ring world champions
- List of boxing triple champions

Sporting positions
Regional boxing titles
Vacant Title last held by Masayuki Kuroda	Japanese flyweight champion 2 February – 23 July 2019; Vacated	Vacant Title next held by Seigo Yuri Akui
World boxing titles
Vacant Title last held by Kosei Tanaka	WBO flyweight champion 6 November 2020 – 27 October 2022; Vacated	Vacant Title next held by Jesse Rodriguez
Vacant Title last held by Kazuto Ioka	WBO junior-bantamweight champion 20 May – 13 December 2023; Vacated	Vacant Title next held by Kosei Tanaka
Preceded by Alexandro Santiago	WBC bantamweight champion 24 February 2024 – 18 September 2025; Vacated	Vacant Title next held by Takuma Inoue
Preceded by Ryosuke Nishida	IBF bantamweight champion 8 June – 18 September 2025; Vacated	Vacant Title next held by José Salas
Vacant Title last held by Naoya Inoue	The Ring bantamweight champion 8 June – 25 September 2025; Vacated	Vacant
Awards
Previous: Leigh Wood; TKO12 Michael Conlan	The Ring Knockout of the Year; KO12 Andrew Moloney; 2023	Next: Daniel Dubois; KO5 Anthony Joshua
