= National Sports Festival of Japan =

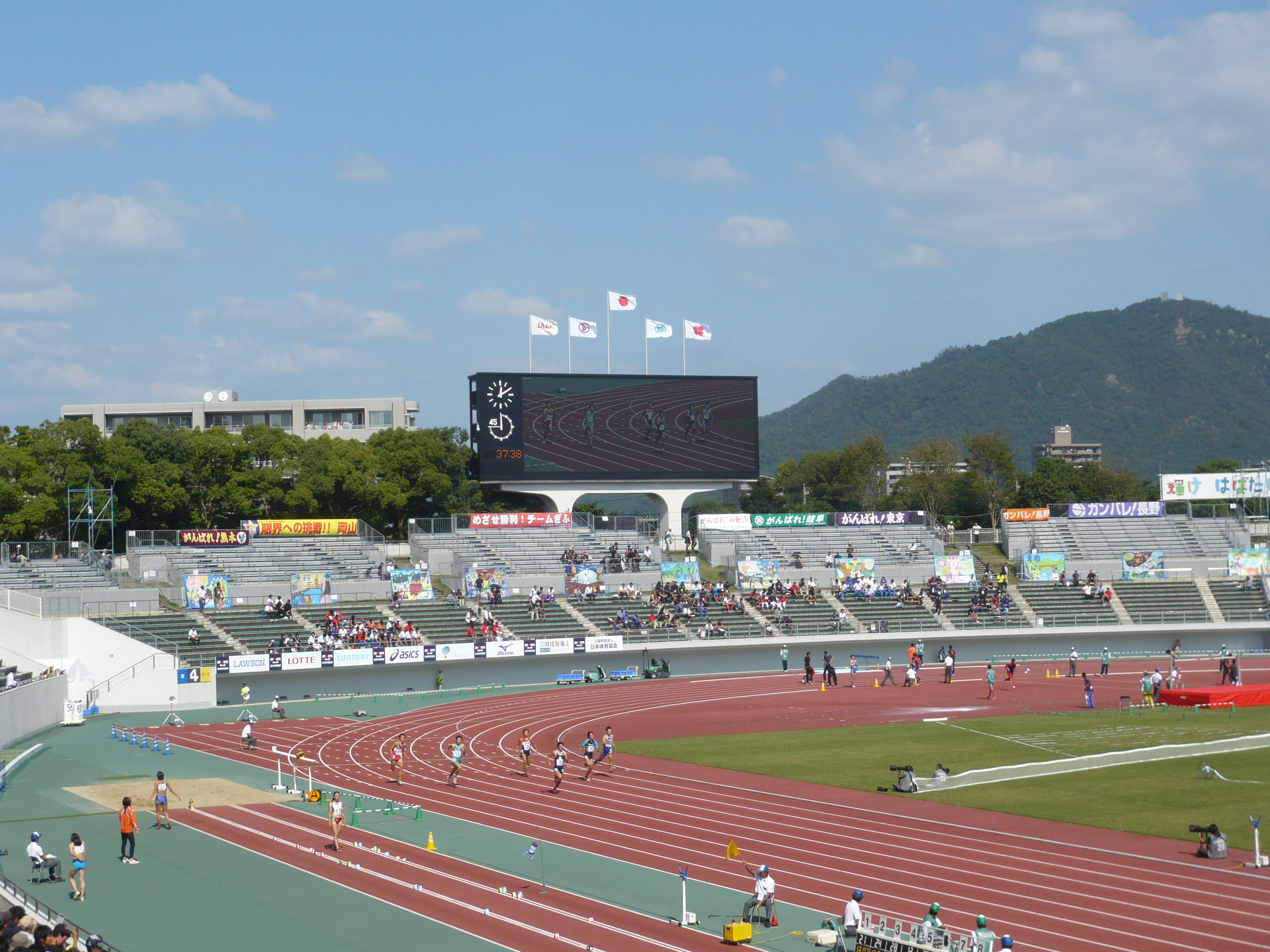
Athletics (67th Tournament, Gifu Prefecture)

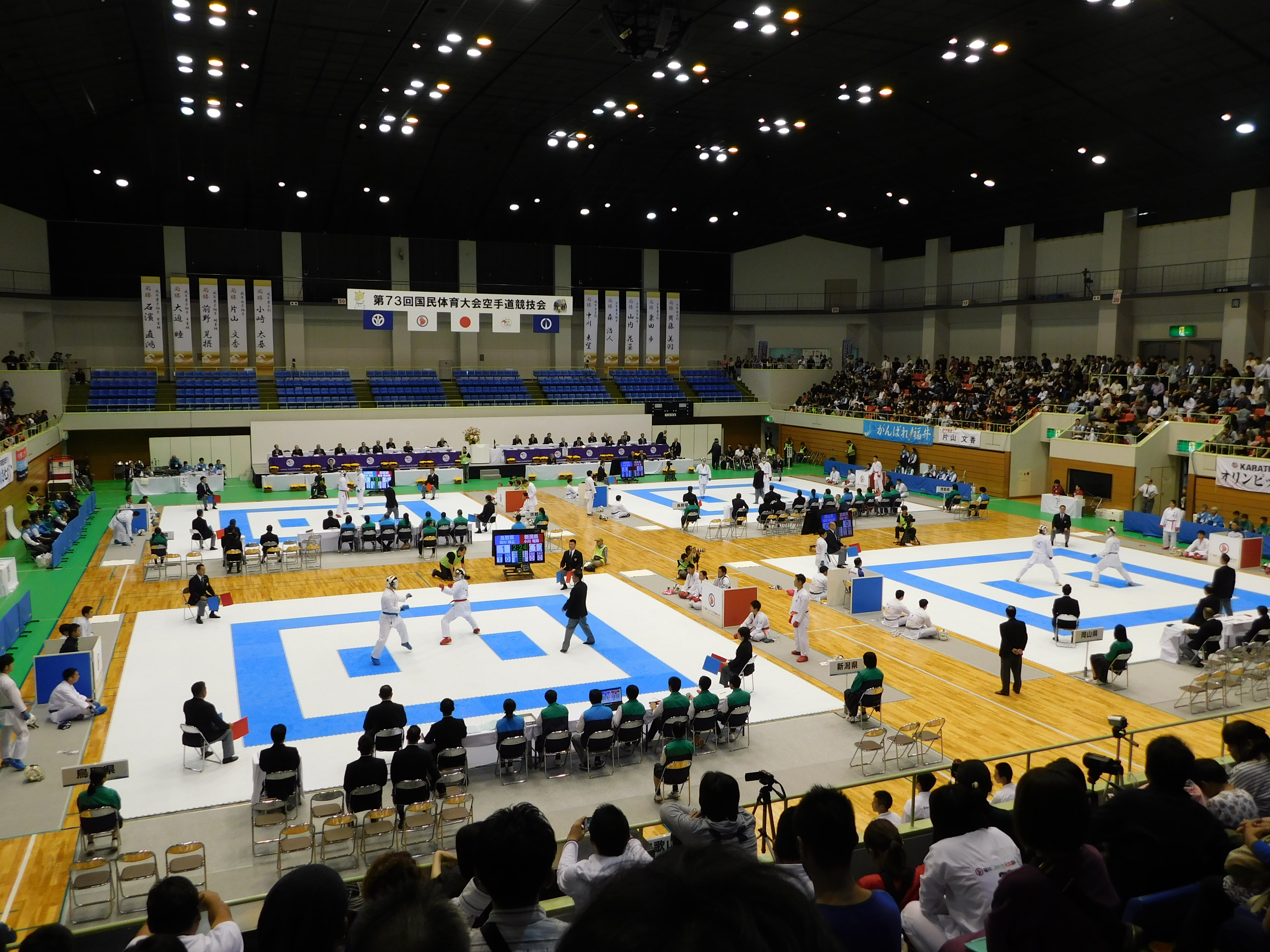
Karatedo competition ( 73rd competition, Fukui prefecture)

The National Sports Festival of Japan (国民体育大会, Kokumin Taiiku Taikai) is the national premier sports event of Japan. It consists of three stages. The skating and ice hockey stage takes place in January, the skiing stage takes place in February, and the main Autumn tournament takes place in September and October. Its name is often abbreviated to Kokutai (国体).

== Outline ==
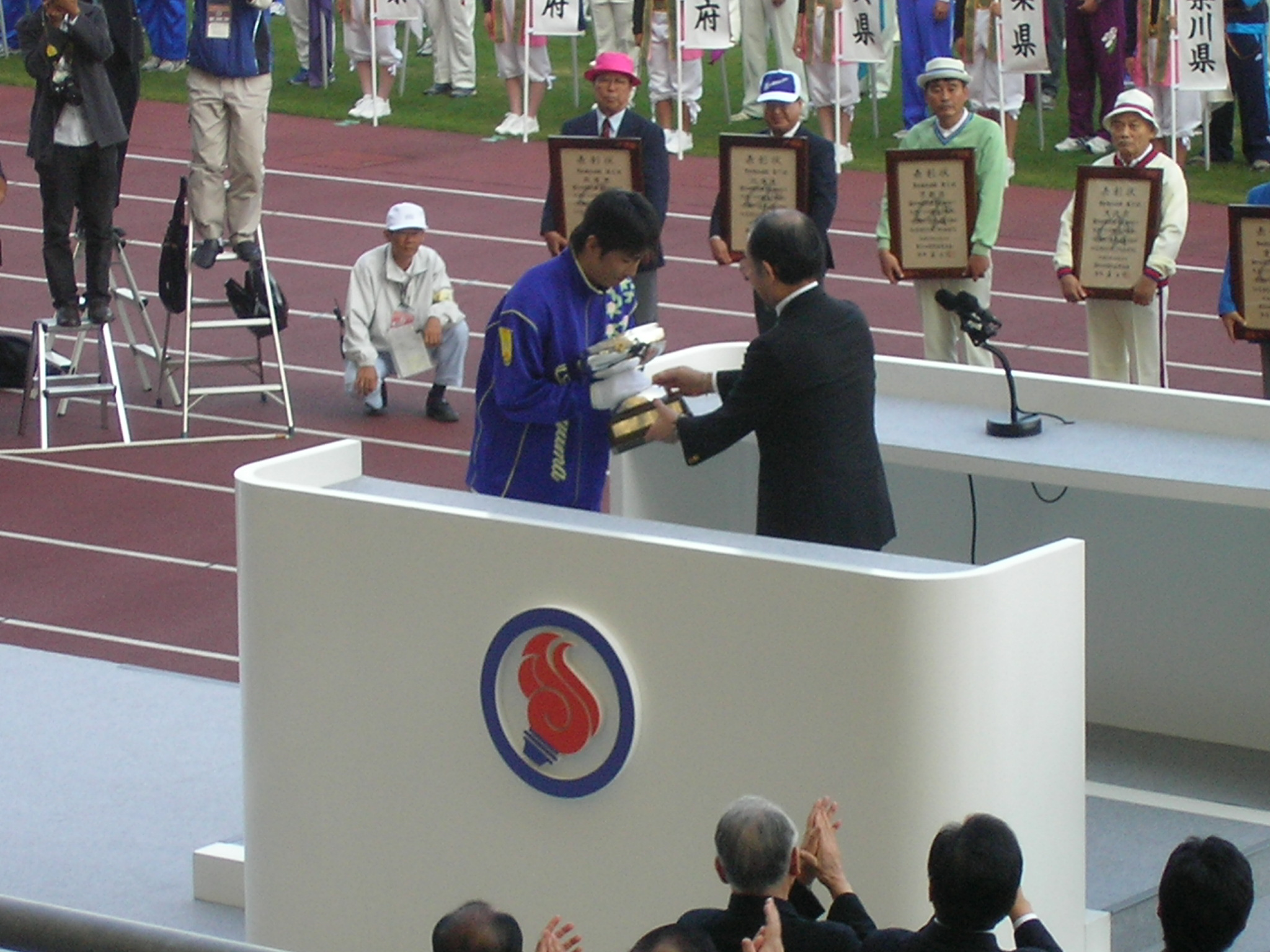
Okayama Prefecture receiving the Emperor's Cup at the closing ceremony of the 60th National Sports Festival

The predecessor to the tournament was the Meiji Shrine tournament held from 1924 until 1943, a period including the Pacific War. Since then there was a Summer tournament that focused on swimming, and an Autumn tournament that focused on track-and-field; however from the 61st tournament in 2006, the Summer and Autumn tournaments were combined. On 20 December 2006 the Japan Sports Association, as the committee for the tournament, decided that swimming was to be held before mid-September as of and beyond the 64th tournament in 2009, though this actually came into effect in the 63rd tournament, in 2008. This took into account the peculiar qualities of holding swimming events. Also the golf tournament was moved forward in the schedule.

The previous Summer and Autumn tournaments have fundamentally been held across one prefecture. The two winter tournaments also take place in the same prefecture, making up the entire tournament. It is often the case when a tournament is held in colder areas such as Hokkaido, Tōhoku, Kōshin'etsu and Hokuriku, that both autumn and tournaments are held in the same prefecture. It is very rare that the skating and ice hockey tournaments are held in separate areas. From the 56th tournament in 2001, the National Sports Festival for People with Disabilities was also held.

- At the skating and ice hockey tournaments includes figure skating, speed skating, short track speed skating, and ice hockey.
- The skiing tournament includes giant slalom, ski jump, Nordic combined, cross-country skiing, and mogul skiing.
- The autumn tournament consists of swimming, water polo, bowling, football, track and field, judo, kendo, fencing, wrestling, mountaineering, volleyball, basketball, softball (adults), baseball (high school - hardball and softball). When the summer and autumn tournaments were held separately, swimming, water polo, bowling and football were held in the summer season.
- In addition, from the 43rd tournament in 1988 an exhibition sports event (known as DSG (デモスポ行事, Demo Supo Gyōji)) was also held. It is an event for people to represent the prefectures they live, work or study in, and involves various active community sports.

During the tournament, the official rankings change in accordance with the number of points earned with the final result being the sum of all four tournaments. The top placing prefecture for both men and women is awarded the Emperor's Cup. The top prefecture for just the women's score is awarded the Empress's Cup.

At first, the summer and autumn tournaments were planned to always be held in Kansai, but after the first tournament in 1946, Ishikawa prefecture were presented the opportunity to host the second tournament. The host prefecture was then rotated throughout Japan.

=== Entry Qualifications and Age Classifications ===
- Entry qualifications differ depending on event, but as a general rule participants must be older than (or in) the third year of junior high school. Third year junior high schoolers have been allowed to participate since the 43rd tournament in 1988.
- Age classification also differs depending on event but here are the general rules for swimming and track and field events. Other events follow similar guidelines.
  - Youth B: Born between 2 April 16 years prior to, and 1 April 14 years prior to the start of the tournament; third year junior high school, and first year high school students.
  - Youth A: Born between 2 April 18 years prior to, and 1 April 16 years prior to the start of the tournament; second and third year high school students.
  - Adults: Born before (and including) 1 April 18 years prior to the start of the tournament.
- At one time there was a separate classification for teaching staff in addition to adults. In track and field, there remains an agreement which states that there much be at least one member of teaching staff, or the team's participation will be invalid.
  - Even now in preparation for the tournament, prefectures will increase recruitment of teaching staff, and reduce it after the event. Hiromi Taniguchi, once aiming for a career in teaching after graduation from university, was unable to take a position due to small vacancy numbers in the immediate aftermath of the Miyazaki event. Also, following the end of the teaching staff classification, an independent national sports tournament came into existence.
- Up until the 59th tournament in 2004, adults could represent the prefecture in which they lived or worked. However, the following year marked the start of a "Hometown Athlete System" of registration (similar to the State of Origin concept in Australian sport).
  - This meant that participants could represent areas where they had graduated from junior high and high school. Thereafter there was an increase in the number of well known "hometown athletes", mainly focused around individual events.
  - From 2011 regulations were revised, to allow for participants who were based outside Japan to represent their home towns. Kosuke Kitajima, based at the time in Los Angeles where his coach lived, represented Tokyo in the 68th tournament in 2013.
- In 2005 action was taken to include the participation of professional athletes under the "How to do it from now project". As a result, a selection of professional athletes have appeared at tournaments since then.
  - However, as a condition, in sports which are not governed by the Japan Professional Sports Association, judgment over participation is entrusted to each sports governing body.
- As for athletes not holding Japanese citizenship, students enrolled in schools under article one of the School Education Law, may be eligible to participate (the decision is made by the governing body for the respective sport). From 2006, foreigners who have permanent residency became eligible to participate.

=== Tournament Logo ===
The official logo of the National Sports Festival of Japan

The logo was created for the 2nd tournament in 1947. The logo is a red torch leaning at a 30-degree incline to the right, wrapped in a blue Obi.

=== Opening ceremony ===
Ever since the second tournament in 1947 the song Young Power (若い力, Wakai Chikara), written by Takao Saeki and composed by Shinichi Takada, has been played at the opening and closing ceremonies of all large-scale sporting events. Furthermore, it is played at an opening ceremony in which the Emperor and Empress are both in attendance. At the Autumn tournament there is a torch relay following which a main torch is lit and burns until the closing ceremony. Previously there was also an opening ceremony at the Winter tournament, but in line with changes to the tournament from 2010 it was changed to a smaller and simpler starting ceremony.

The torch, which is based on the Olympic flame, was first introduced at the 5th tournament in 1950, and the torch relay at the 12th tournament in 1957. From the 3rd tournament in 1948 a relay event had been held, though this was to carry the tournament's official flag, though this only remained until the 27th tournament in 1972. Afterwards, only the torch relay took place.

=== Scoring and awards ===
Points are awarded depending on the outcome of each individual event, with the sum of these points being the method of competing for the Emperor's and Empresses Cups. 10 points are given for participation in each game in the tournament (which includes block-tournaments). Points are not awarded for participation in a block-tournament if the entrant was eligible to participate in the main tournament. In the 64th tournament, the maximum number of participation points available was set at 400 points. The number of points awarded for victories differs depending on the event.

As well as the two main trophies, each event awards trophies and certificates to victorious athletes.

== Criticism and problems ==
=== Host victory principle ===
Ever since the 1964 tournament in Niigata, the host team winning the Emperor's Cup and Empress's Cup has generally become the norm. This is not simply down to that team's preliminary scores, but by a number of factors including the ability to field athletes in every competition and the ability to strengthen athletes with the funding going into newly institutions such as venues and event management. In fact, Nobu Nishimura, the lieutenant governor of Yamaguchi prefecture which hosted the 2011 tournament, said at a party "the hosts have an advantage in events with flagmen (events where the result is decided by officials)" and "even if there's 'cheating' they will take first place". When he was criticised, he explained his position by saying "I meant the tendency where host prefectures have an advantage, not that it's ok to break the rules".

In a move counter to this custom, as a result of then Kōchi prefecture governor, Daijirō Hashimoto, abolishing it at the 2002 Kochi hosted tournament, host prefecture Kōchi finished in 10th place with Tokyo winning overall. However, this is the only time such an occasion as occurred.

=== Large scale arena constructions ===
Recently many host prefectures have built large-scale venues in which to host various events, with a large focus on appearance. Examples include Nagai Stadium, Miyagi Stadium, Ōita Bank Dome, Tohoku Electric Power Big Swan Stadium, Shizuoka Stadium and International Stadium Yokohama. These were generally acknowledged as being built for the 2002 FIFA World Cup, but in reality their construction purpose was to be the main arena of the tournaments (however the International Stadium Yokohama was built with the intention of potentially hosting an Olympic games, and Nagai Stadium was renovated rather than built from scratch). The aforementioned arenas are also sometimes used as a base for J. League football teams based within the prefecture, but other arenas are not used very often following the tournament. In spite of no large-scale events being anticipated as taking place there following the tournament, large amounts of tax payer money continues to go toward its maintenance.

== History ==
=== Predecessor ===
Before the war, there was a tournament, called the Meiji Shrine Tournament, that was held from 1924 to 1943. It had no winter tournament and was held in each area of Kanto, as a general rule commencing in the outer garden of the Meiji Shrine (an area spanning what is now Shibuya and Shinjuku in Tokyo).

=== Formation ===
On 26 December 1945 at the Kishi Memorial Gymnasium, Ryōzō Hiranuma (director of the Japan Sports Association), Izutarō Suehiro (chairman of the Japan Swimming Federation), Sanburō Kiyose, Tatsuo Hisatomi and Keijirō Ishida, who had all held important sporting administrative positions since before the war, proposed holding a national athletics event during talks about how sporting events could take place in the post war period.

In 1946, the group had informal talks with Hiromu Kasuga, the chairman of the Kansai Sports Federation, and formed a board of directors. After having their proposal examined and approval gained from GHQ, they received 400,000 yen from the government to help with costs, and the first tournament was held.

=== Tournament history ===
Awarding the Emperor's Cup and Empress's Cup has depend on the prefecture. In the first, second, and the special tournament in 1973, neither were awarded. In the 6th, 7th and 8th tournaments, the winter tournament was split from the summer and autumn tournament. In the 9th tournament, it was divided further by separating the swimming tournament.

Any prefecture that was able to host the winter, summer and autumn tournaments have a ☆ mark at the start of their tournament names.

The tournament names are generally a reference to the autumn tournament. It is possible that the winter tournaments had a different name, especially if they were held elsewhere.

Tournaments in blue show where the host did not win the Emperor's Cup.

Event	Year	Host	Name	Slogan	Emperor's Cup	Empress Cup
1	1946	Kyoto, Osaka and Kobe (Note: For the first tournament, as the main schedule was designed to follow the fiscal year, the winter tournament schedule was designed right after the autumn tournament (so the order was to be summer → autumn → winter, but owing to a problem with participant transportation the winter tournament did not take place). This was similar schedule to the pre-war Meiji Shrine tournament. Owing to this, in the second tournament, from where a calendar system was used, there was no winter tournament. From the third tournament, the winter tournament came into action, giving the tournament order of winter → summer → autumn.)	近畿国体 (Kinki Kokutai)	None	N/A	
2	1947	Ishikawa	石川国体 (Ishikawa Kokutai)	None	N/A	
3	1948	Fukuoka	福岡国体 (Fukuoka Kokutai)	None	Tokyo	Kyoto
4	1949	Tokyo	東京国体 (Toukyou Kokutai)	None	Tokyo	Tokyo
5	1950	Aichi	愛知国体 (Aichi Kokutai)	None	Tokyo	Tokyo
6	1951	Hiroshima	広島国体 (Hiroshima Kokutai)	None	Hokkaido (Winter)	Hokkaido (Winter)
6	1951	Hiroshima	広島国体 (Hiroshima Kokutai)	None	Tokyo (Summer/Autumn)	Tokyo (Summer/Autumn)
7	1952	Fukushima, Miyagi and Yamagata	東北3県国体 (Touhoku Sanken Kokutai)	None	Hokkaido (Winter)	Hokkaido (Winter)
7	1952	Fukushima, Miyagi and Yamagata	東北3県国体 (Touhoku Sanken Kokutai)	None	Tokyo (Summer/Autumn)	Tokyo (Summer/Autumn)
8	1953	Ehime, Kagawa, Tokushima and Kochi	四国国体 (Shikoku Kokutai)	None	Hokkaido (Winter)	Hokkaido (Winter)
8	1953	Ehime, Kagawa, Tokushima and Kochi	四国国体 (Shikoku Kokutai)	None	Tokyo (Summer/Autumn)	Tokyo (Summer/Autumn)
9	1954	Hokkaido	北海道国体 (Hokkaidou Kokutai)	None	Hokkaido (Winter)	Hokkaido (Winter)
9	1954	Hokkaido	北海道国体 (Hokkaidou Kokutai)	None	Nara (Swimming)	Nara (Swimming)
9	1954	Hokkaido	北海道国体 (Hokkaidou Kokutai)	None	Tokyo (Summer/Autumn)	Tokyo (Summer/Autumn)
10	1955	Kanagawa	神奈川国体 (Kanagawa Kokutai)	None	Tokyo	Tokyo
11	1956	Hyogo	兵庫国体 (Hyougo Kokutai)	None	Tokyo	Tokyo
12	1957	Shizuoka	静岡国体 (Shizuoka Kokutai)	None	Shizuoka	Tokyo
13	1958	Toyama	富山国体 (Toyama Kokutai)	None	Tokyo	Tokyo
14	1959	Tokyo (Note: Due to the Isewan Typhoon, Aichi, Mie and Gifu did not participate.)	東京国体 (Toukyou Kokutai)	None	Tokyo	Tokyo
15	1960	Kumamoto	熊本国体 (Kumamoto Kokutai)	None	Tokyo	Tokyo
16	1961	Akita	秋田国体 (Akita Kokutai)	明るい国体 (Akarui Kokutai)	Tokyo	Tokyo
17	1962	Okayama	岡山国体 (Okayama Kokutai)	歴史をつくる岡山国体 (Rekishi wo Tsukuru Okayama Kokutai)	Tokyo	Tokyo
18	1963	Yamaguchi	山口国体 (Yamaguchi Kokutai)	友愛・奉仕・躍進 (Yuuai・Houshi・Yakushin)	Tokyo	Tokyo
19	1964	Niigata (Note: As Tokyo was hosting the 1964 Summer Olympics, the autumn tournament was moved forward to June. Also the summer tournament was cancelled due to the 1964 Niigata earthquake which occurred right after.)	新潟国体 (Niigata Kokutai)	国体へ県民一致の力こぶ (Kokutai e Kenmin Icchi no Chikara Kobu)	Niigata	Niigata
20	1965	Gifu	岐阜国体 (Gifu Kokutai)	明るく つよく 美しく (Akaruku Tsuyoku Utsukushiku)	Gifu	Gifu
21	1966	Oita	剛健国体 (Gouken Kokutai)	剛健・友愛・信義 (Gouken・Yuuai・Shingi)	Oita	Tokyo
22	1967	Saitama	清新国体 (Seishin Kokutai)	成功させよう埼玉国体・まごころで迎えよう埼玉国体 (Seikousaseyou Saitama Kokutai・Magokoro de Mukaeyou Saitama Kokutai)	Saitama	Saitama
23	1968	Fukui	親切国体 (Shinsetsu Kokutai)	明るくきよくたくましく (Akaruku Kiyoku Takumashiku)	Fukui	Tokyo
24	1969	Nagasaki	創造国体 (Souzou Kokutai)	あすをひらく創造国体 (Asu wo Hiraku Souzou Kokutai)	Nagasaki	Nagasaki
25	1970	Iwate	みちのく国体 (Michinoku Kokutai)	誠実 明朗 躍進 (Seijitsu Meirou Yakushin)	Iwate	Osaka
26	1971	Wakayama	黒潮国体 (Kuroshio Kokutai)	明るく・豊かに・たくましく (Akaruku・Yutakani・Takumashiku)	Wakayama	Osaka
27	1972	Kagoshima	太陽国体 (Taiyou Kokutai)	明るく たくましく うるわしく (Akaruku Takumashiku Uruwashiku)	Kagoshima	Kagoshima
Sp.	1973	Okinawa (Note: Tournament to commemorate the return of Okinawa and other islands to Japan following the American occupation.)	若夏国体 (Wakanatsu Kokutai)	強く、明るく、新しく (Tsuyoku, Akaruku, Atarashiku)	N/A	
28	1973	Chiba	若潮国体 (Wakashio Kokutai)	輝く心 輝く力 輝く太陽 (Kagayaku Kokoro Kagayaku Chikara Kagayaku Taiyou)	Chiba	Tokyo
29	1974	Ibaraki	水と緑のまごころ国体 (Mizu to Midori no Magokoro Kokutai)	None	Ibaraki	Ibaraki
30	1975	Mie	三重国体 (Mie Kokutai)	None	Mie	Mie
31	1976	Saga	若楠国体 (Wakakusu Kokutai)	さわやかに すこやかに おおらかに (Sawayakani Sukoyakani Oorakani)	Saga	Tokyo
32	1977	Aomori	☆あすなろ国体 (Asunaro Kokutai)	心ゆたかに力たくましく (Kokoro Yutakani Chikara Takumashiku)	Aomori	Aomori
33	1978	Nagano	☆やまびこ国体 (Yamagiko Kokutai)	日本の屋根に手をつなぐ (Nihon no Yane ni Te wo Tsunagu)	Nagano	Nagano
34	1979	Miyazaki	日本のふるさと宮崎国体 (Nihon no Furusato Miyazaki Kokutai)	伸びる心、伸びる力、伸びる郷土 (Nobiru Kokoro, Nobiru Chikara, Nobiru Gyoudo)	Miyazaki	Miyazaki
35	1980	Tochigi	栃の葉国体 (Tochinohana Kokutai)	のびる力 むすぶ心 ひらくあした (Nobiru Chikara Musuba Kokoro Hiraku Ashita)	Tochigi	Tochigi
36	1981	Shiga	びわこ国体 (Biwako Kokutai)	水と緑にあふれる若さ (Mizu to Midori ni Afureru Wakasa)	Shiga	Shiga
37	1982	Shimane	くにびき国体 (Kunibiki Kokutai)	このふれあいが未来をひらく (Kono Fureai ga Mirai wo Hiraku)	Shimane	Shimane
38	1983	Gunma	☆あかぎ国体 (Akagi Kokutai)	風に向かって走ろう (Kaze ni Mukatte Hashirou)	Gunma	Gunma
39	1984	Nara	わかくさ国体 (Wakakusa Kokutai)	駆けよ大和路 はばたけ未来 (Kakeyo Yamato Michi Habatake Mirai)	Nara	Nara
40	1985	Tottori	わかとり国体 (Wakatori Kokutai)	明日へ向かって はばたこう (Asu e Mukatte Habatakou)	Tottori	Tottori
41	1986	Yamanashi	かいじ国体 (Kaiji Kokutai)	ふれあいの場をひろげよう (Fureai no Ba wo Hirogeyou)	Yamanashi	Yamanashi
42	1987	Okinawa	海邦国体 (Mikuni Kokutai)	きらめく太陽、ひろがる友情 (Kirameku Taiou, Hirogaru Yuujou)	Okinawa	Okinawa
43	1988	Kyoto	京都国体 (Kyouto Kokutai)	新しい歴史に向かって走ろう (Atarashii Rekishi ni Mukatte Hashirou)	Kyoto	Kyoto
44	1989	Hokkaido	☆はまなす国体 (Hamanasu Kokutai)	君よ今、北の大地の風となれ (Kimi Yo Ima, Kita no Daichi no Kaze to Nare)	Hokkaido	Hokkaido
45	1990	Fukuoka	とびうめ国体 (Tobi Ume Kokutai)	ときめき 出会い みなぎる力 (Tokimeki Deai Minagiru Chikara)	Fukuoka	Fukuoka
46	1991	Ishikawa	石川国体 (Ishikawa Kokutai)	すばらしき 君の記録に わが拍手 (Subarashiki Kimi no Kiroku ni Waga Hakushu)	Ishikawa	Ishikawa
47	1992	Yamagata	☆べにばな国体 (Benibana Kokutai)	思いっきり躍動 21世紀の主役たち (Omoikkiri Yakudou 21 Seiki no Shuyakutachi)	Yamagata	Yamagata
48	1993	Kagawa and Tokushima	東四国国体 (Higashi Shikoku Kokutai)	出会い 競い そして未来へ (Deai Kisou Soshite Mirai e)	Kagawa	Kagawa
49	1994	Aichi	わかしゃち国体 (Wakashicha Kokutai)	いい汗キャッチ!生き生き愛知 (Ii Ase Kyacchi! Ikiiki Aichi)	Aichi	Aichi
50	1995	Fukushima	☆ふくしま国体 (Fukushima Kokutai)	友よほんとうの空にとべ! (Tomo Yo Hontou no Sora ni Tobe!)	Fukushima	Fukushima
51	1996	Hiroshima	ひろしま国体 (Hiroshima Kokutai)	いのちいっぱい、咲きんさい! (Inochippoi, Sakinsai!)	Hiroshima	Hiroshima
52	1997	Osaka	なみはや国体 (Namihaya Kokutai)	おおさか ふれ愛 夢づくり (Oosaka Fureai Yumedzukuri)	Osaka	Osaka
53	1998	Kanagawa	かながわ・ゆめ国体 (Kanagawa・Yume Kokutai)	おお汗 こ汗 (Oo Ase Ko Ase)	Kanagawa	Kanagawa
54	1999	Kumamoto	くまもと未来国体 (Kumamoto Mirai Kokutai)	人、光る。 (Hito, Hikaru.)	Kumamoto	Kumamoto
55	2000	Toyama	2000年とやま国体 (2000 Nen Toyama Kokutai)	あいの風 夢のせて (Ai no Kaze Yume Nosete)	Toyama	Toyama
56	2001	Miyagi	新世紀・みやぎ国体 (Shinseiki・Miyagi Kokutai)	いいね!その汗、その笑顔 (Ii ne! Sono Ase, Sono Egao)	Miyagi	Miyagi
57	2002	Kochi	よさこい高知国体 (Yosakoi Kouchi Kokutai)	いしん前進 (Ishin Zenshin)	Tokyo	Tokyo
58	2003	Shizuoka	NEW!!わかふじ国体 (NEW!! Wakafuji Kokutai)	"がんばる"が好き ("Ganbaru" ga Suki)	Shizuoka	Shizuoka
59	2004	Saitama	彩の国まごころ国体 (Sai no Kuni Magokoro Kokutai)	とどけ この夢 この歓声 (Todoke Kono Yume Kono Kansei)	Saitama	Saitama
60	2005	Okayama	晴れの国おかやま国体 (Hare no Kuni Okayama Kokutai)	あなたがキラリ☆ (Anata ga Kirari)	Okayama	Okayama
61	2006	Hyogo	のじぎく兵庫国体 (Nojigiku Hyougo Kokutai)	"ありがとう"心から・ひょうごから ("Arigatou" Kokoro kara・Hyougo kara)	Hyogo	Hyogo
62	2007	Akita	秋田わか杉国体 (Akita Wakasugi Kokutai)	君のハートよ位置につけ (Kimi no Ha-to yo Ichi ni Tsuke)	Akita	Akita
63	2008	Oita	チャレンジ!おおいた国体 (Charenji! Ooita Kokutai)	ここから未来へ 新たな一歩 (Koko kara Mirai e Aratana Ippou)	Oita	Oita
64	2009	Niigata	トキめき新潟国体 (Tokimeki Niigata Kokutai)	トキはなて 君の力を 大空へ (Tokihanate Kimi no Chikara wo Oozora e)	Niigata	Niigata
65	2010	Chiba	ゆめ半島千葉国体 (Yume Hantou Chiba Kokutai)	今 房総の風となり この一瞬に輝きを (Ima Fusafusa no Kaze to Nari Kono Isshun ni Kagayaki wo)	Chiba	Chiba
66	2011	Yamaguchi	おいでませ!山口国体 (Oidemase! Yamaguchi Kokutai)	君の一生けんめいに会いたい (Kimi no Isshoukenmei ni Aitai)	Yamaguchi	Yamaguchi
67	2012	Gifu	☆ぎふ清流国体 (Gifu Seiryuu Kokutai)	輝け はばたけ だれもが主役 (Kagayake Habatake Daremo ga Shuyaku)	Gifu	Gifu
68	2013	Tokyo	スポーツ祭東京2013 (Supo-tsu Matsuri Toukyou 2013)	東京に 多摩に 島々に 羽ばたけアスリート (Tokyo ni Tama ni Shimajima ni Habatake Athlete)	Tokyo	Tokyo
69	2014	Nagasaki	長崎がんばらんば国体 (Nagasaki Ganbaranba Kokutai)	君の夢 はばたけ今 ながさきから (Kimi no Yume Habatake Ima Nagasaki kara)	Nagasaki	Tokyo
70	2015	Wakayama	紀の国わかやま国体 (Ki no Kuni Wakayama Kokutai)	躍動と歓喜、そして絆 (Yakudou to Kanki, Soshite Kizuna)	Wakayama	Tokyo
71	2016	Iwate	希望郷いわて国体 (Kibou Sato Iwate Kokutai)	広げよう 感動。伝えよう 感謝 (Hirogeyou Kandou. Tsutaeyou Kansha)	Tokyo	Tokyo
72	2017	Ehime	愛顔つなぐえひめ国体 (Egao Tsunagu Ehime Kokutai)	君は風 いしづちを駆け 瀬戸に舞え (Kimi no Kaze Ishidzuchi wo Kake Seto ni Mae)	Tokyo	Tokyo
73	2018	Fukui	福井しあわせ元気国体 (Fukui Shiawase Genki Kokutai)	織りなそう 力と技と美しさ (Orinasou Chikara to Wagi to Utsukushisa)	Fukui	Fukui
74	2019	Ibaraki	いきいき茨城ゆめ国体 (Iki-iki Ibaraki Yume Kokutai)	翔べ 羽ばたけ そして未来へ (Tobe Habatake Soshite Mirai e)	Ibaraki	Ibaraki
75	2020	Kagoshima	燃ゆる感動かごしま国体 (Moyuru Kandow Kagoshima Kokutai)	熱い鼓動 風は南から (Atsui Kodo Kaze ha Minami kara)	cancelled, due to prevention measure of COVID-19, this event postpone to 2023.	
76	2021	Mie	三重とこわか国体 (Mie Tokowaka Kokutai)	ときめいて人 かがやいて未来 (Tokimeite Hito Kagayaite Mirai)	cancelled, due to prevention measures of COVID-19, Sars cov-2, this event postpone date undecided	
77	2022	Tochigi	いちご一会とちぎ国体 (Ichigo Ichie Tochigi Kokutai)	夢を感動へ 感動を未来へ (Yume wo Kando e Kando wo Mirai e)	To be confirmed	To be confirmed
78	2023	Kagoshima	燃ゆる感動かごしま国体 (Moyuru Kandow Kagoshima Kokutai)	熱い鼓動風は南から (Atsui Kodo Kaze ha Minani kara)	To be confirmed	To be confirmed
79	2024	Saga	SAGA2023	新しい大会へ。すべての人に、スポーツのチカラを。 (Atarashii Taikai e. Subete no Hito ni, Sports no Chikara wo.)	To be confirmed	To be confirmed
80	2025	Shiga	To be confirmed	To be confirmed	To be confirmed	To be confirmed
81	2026	Aomori	To be confirmed	To be confirmed	To be confirmed	To be confirmed
82	2027	Miyazaki	To be confirmed	To be confirmed	To be confirmed	To be confirmed
83	2028	Nagano	To be confirmed	To be confirmed	To be confirmed	To be confirmed
84	2029	Gunma	To be confirmed	To be confirmed	To be confirmed	To be confirmed
85	2030	Shimane	To be confirmed	To be confirmed	To be confirmed	To be confirmed
86	2031	To be confirmed	To be confirmed	To be confirmed	To be confirmed	To be confirmed
87	2032	To be confirmed	To be confirmed	To be confirmed	To be confirmed	To be confirmed
88	2033	Tottori	To be confirmed	To be confirmed	To be confirmed	To be confirmed
89	2034	Okinawa	To be confirmed	To be confirmed	To be confirmed	To be confirmed

== Commemorative items ==
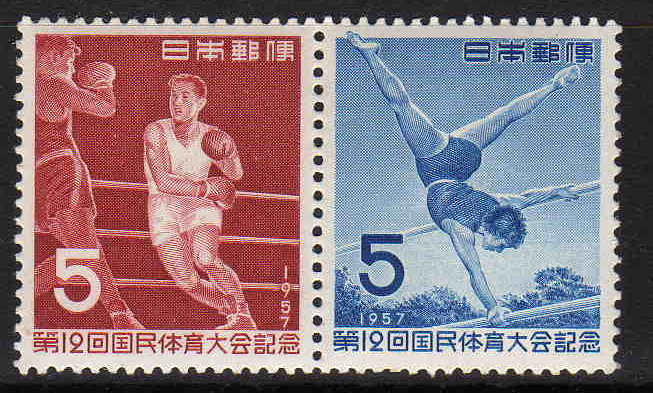
A commemorative stamp from the 12th tournament (1957)

With the exception of the first tournament, commemorative stamps have generally been issued for the autumn tournament. For the 2nd to 5th tournaments, 4 types of stamp were issued (only the third tournament had 5 types for the winter tournament as well). From the 6th to the 21st tournaments, there were two types of stamp issued, and ever since then there has been one type of stamp released for each tournament.

The regions railway company also issues commemorative items such as train tickets.

== Mascot characters ==
Each tournament normally has a unique mascot character to help build support and encourage good PR. The first mascot was a nameless goat for the 30th tournament (1975) in Mie prefecture, though it was referred to as pet-mark. In the 38th tournament, hosted in Gunma in 1983, the first named character, a horse called Gunma-chan, was used. From then on, having a named character became the norm. There were no characters between from the 31st to the 37th tournaments.

Recently, owing to the "Yuru-chara" boom, mascot characters commonly become official mascots of the prefecture in some capacity. There are many mascots who were already established as prefectural mascots prior to the tournament itself.

- National Sports Festival of Japan Official Mascots (Wikipedia (ja):国民体育大会マスコットキャラクター)

== Ceremonial music ==
At the opening and closing ceremonies the ceremonial music used is produced for each tournament, with it being performed when the torch and athletes enter the arena.

In addition to this, it is often the case where a singer with a strong local connection will sing, along with songs which match the theme of the tournament.

== Television broadcasts ==
- Generally there is a daily broadcast throughout the tournament from 3pm to 4pm on NHK Educational TV giving information about one or two events of that day. Also the opening ceremony is broadcast on NHK General TV.
- On days in which there are competitive events rather than the opening and closing ceremonies, that prefecture's NHK or private regional television studios and equipment are used (the newsroom, an open studio etc.). Also announcers from those stations (normally either a man and a woman, or just one person) take the host role, explaining events as the tournament progresses. The general broadcast format follows a simple flow. The outline summary of that day's main games, as well as introducing key athletes, a broadcast from the main sport venue of that day, a broadcast from the studio giving results of other events and other topics.

== Events ==
Events in bold have taken place since the first tournament.

- Skiing
  - Giant slalom
  - Special jump
  - Cross-country skiing
  - Nordic combined
  - Mogul skiing (Open event)
  - Snowboarding (Open event)
- Biathlon (Open event)
- **Skating**
  - Speed skating
  - Short track speed skating
  - Figure skating
- **Ice hockey**
- **Softball**
- **Football**
- **Track and field**
- Swimming
  - Swimming races
  - Diving
  - Synchronised swimming
  - Water polo
- **Tennis**
- **Rowing**
- **Field hockey**
- **Boxing**
- **Volleyball**
- **Gymnastics**
- **Basketball**
- **Wrestling**
- **Sailing**
- **Weightlifting**
- **Handball**
- **Cycling**
- **Soft tennis**
- **Table tennis**
- **Sumo wrestling**
- **Equestrianism**
- Fencing
- Judo
- Badminton
- Kyūdō
- Rifle shooting
- Kendo
- **Rugby**
- Mountaineering
- Canoeing
- Archery
- Karate
- Jūkendō
- Clay pigeon shooting
- Naginata
- Bowling
- Golf
- **High school baseball** (Open event)
- Beach volleyball (Open event)
- Triathlon (Open event)

=== Previous events ===
- American football - First tournament only
- Touch football - Second tournament only
- Corporate baseball - First three tournaments only
- Shinai Kyōgi

=== Exhibition Sporting Events ===
There are normally around 20 exhibition events held at the Autumn tournament. The trend is to hold events that make the best use of local features.

- Indiaca
- Orienteering
- Aerobics super session
- Recreational dance
- Houston safety blowgun
- Recreational table tennis
- Hang gliding・Paragliding
- ESCI tennis
- Soft volleyball
- Target bird golf
- Sports chanbara
- Walking
- Futsal
- Sea kayak
- Gateball
- Wushu
- Ground golf
- Tug of war
- Mini softball
- Mini tennis
- Folk dance
- Duathlon
- Kin-ball
- Tee ball
- Mini volleyball
- Cayman golf
- Mallet golf
- Curolling
- Dodgebee
- Taspony
- Cycling
- Wakeboarding
- Petanque
- Billiards
- Skateboarding
- Roller sports
- Bound tennis
- Padel tennis
- Beach football
- Beachball volleyball
- Surfing
- Senior Softball
- Neo-tennis
- Powerlifting
- Darts
- BMX
- Trampobics
- Taidō
- Spolec
- Floorball
- Radio calisthenics
- Rhythmic gymnastics
- 3B gymnastics
- Triathlon
- 5 km and 10 km Jogging marathons
- Protected karate

Boys and Girls Sports

- Dodgeball
- Softball
- Football
- Handball

Disabled sports

- Blind football
- Powerchair football
- Disabled softball
- Disabled golf

Winter

- Snowboarding
- Freestyle skiing
- Curling

=== Future tournaments ===
- From the 2013 tournament in Tokyo, softball, naginata, jūkendō and the triathlon will take place biannually.
- There are debates underway regarding the implementation of women's events for sports in which there is a women's counterpart in the Olympics. Women's events have been added for Judo (since 1991) and Football (since 1997). There are plans for a 7-a-side women's rugby event, as well as a movement to change women's cycling and wrestling, which are currently exhibition events, into full tournament events.
- Regarding youth sections, there have been motions to place upper limits on the number of participants, due to overcrowding.

== Extras ==
- If a full-time company employee takes part in a tournament as a player, coach, referee, judge, official etc., they might qualify for special leave.
- In the case of team sports, where it comes to team selections, it has been known for champion teams to go unchanged in subsequent tournaments. That is a matter for the sports governing body in each prefecture to determine.

== See also ==
- Sport in Japan
- List of sports governing bodies in Japan
