= Jayr Raquinel =

Filipino boxer (born 1997)

Personal information
- Nickname: The Dreamer
- Nationality: Filipino
- Born: Jay-r Sarin Raquinel; February 1, 1997 (age 29) Candoni, Negros Occidental, Philippines
- Height: 1.65 m (5 ft 5 in)
- Weight: Mini flyweight; Light flyweight; Flyweight; Super flyweight

Boxing career
- Reach: 166 cm (65 in)
- Stance: Southpaw

Boxing record
- Total fights: 22
- Wins: 18
- Win by KO: 14
- Losses: 3
- Draws: 1

Jayr Raquinel (born February 1, 1997, Candoni, Negros Occidental, Philippines) was a Filipino boxer who held the OPBF flyweight champion from 2018 to 2019 and the WBO Inter-continental super flyweight title from 2022 to 2023.

== Professional career ==
=== Mini flyweight ===
==== Debut ====
Raquinel started his debut as mini flyweight where he stopped fellow debutant Mark Cutara in the first round.

=== Light flyweight ===
Raquinel made his light flyweight debut on his second fight against John Apul Safera, he won via 1st TKO.

==== Raquinel vs. Calacar ====
After six consecutive victories, Raquinel was given a title match against Glenne Calacar for the Philippines Luzon Professional Boxing Association (LuzProBA) light flyweight title, after 10 rounds it ended in a Split draw with the scores of:96-94 for Raquinel, 98-92 for Calacar and 95–95 tie.

=== Flyweight ===
==== Raquinel vs. Rosales ====
On October 20, 2017, Raquinel was granted a title shot against Richard Rosales for the vacant OPBF Silver flyweight title, after 10 Rounds of boxing, Raquinel was able to secure the win via Majority decision granting him the OPBF Silver flyweight title.

==== Raquinel vs. Nakayama ====
Just after defeating Rosales, Raquinel was granted a title shot against the reigning OPBF champion, Keisuke Nakayama fighting him for 12 Rounds in Nakayama's own home city and country, Tokyo, Japan, in the 9th round Raquinel stops Nakayama and claimed the OPBF flyweight title.

==== Raquinel vs. Tuolehazi ====
After a successful defense of his title, Raquinel took on Wulan Tuolehazi of China for the WBC Silver flyweight title, but Raquinel falls short against Tuolehazi via lop-sided unanimous decision in China, facing his first ever defeat.

==== Raquinel vs. Magramo ====
After the OPBF flyweight title, that was held by Raquinel himself, turned vacant due to Raquinel being unable to defend it, possibly because of COVID-19, on October 23, 2021, Raquinel was given a chance to retake in a fight against the hard-hitting compatriot, Giemel Magramo, Raquinel suffered his second loss against Magramo via unanimous decision, therefore he was unable to retake the OPBF flyweight title.

=== Super flyweight ===
==== Raquinel vs. Ngxeke ====
Despite Raquinel suffering a loss against Magramo, he moved up to super flyweight and was given a chance to take the vacant WBO Inter-continental super flyweight title against the then undefeated South African fighter, Landi Ngxeke, Raquinel made an upset as he wins via TKO in the 2nd round, claiming the WBO Inter-continental super flyweight belt.

==== Cancelled fight vs. Cataraja ====
Raquinel challenged the new OPBF super flyweight champion and undefeated Filipino boxer, Kevin Jake Cataraja, who won the vacant belt against Edward Heno, the bout is set at Nagoya, Japan on November 11, 2023, however, a last minute postponement struck, as the bout was cancelled due to the non-arrival of Carlos Flores who would be fighting in the initial main event, the promoter 3150fight cancels the whole event, Raquinel's bout against Cataraja is tentatively set in February 2024.

==== Raquinel vs. Nantapech ====
On 30 May 2024, Raquinel challenged former world title challenger Komgrich Nantapech who goes by his ring name Eaktwan BTU Ruaviking at Spaceplus Bangkok RCA, Bangkok, Thailand, Raquinel scored a devastating brutal 2nd-round knockout victory.

== Professional boxing record ==
22 fights	18 wins	3 losses
By knockout	14	0
By decision	3	3
By disqualification	1	0
Draws	1	

No.	Result	Record	Opponent	Type	Round, time	Date	Location	Note(s)
22	Loss	18–3–1	Theophilus Allotey	UD	12	20 Dec 2025	Legon Sports Stadium, Accra, Ghana	For vacant WBO Global super-flyweight title
21	Win	18–2–1	Imani Matendo	TKO	4 (10), 1:56	25 May 2025	SMX Convention Center, Bacolod, Philippines	Won vacant ABF super-flyweight title
20	Win	17–2–1	Yahir Alan Frank Verdugo	UD	12	13 Oct 2024	Hermosillo, Sonora, Mexico	Won vacant WBC Continental Americas super-flyweight title
19	Win	16–2–1	Komgrich Nantapech	TKO	2 (6), 1:13	30 May 2024	Spaceplus Bangkok RCA, Bangkok, Thailand	
18	Win	15–2–1	Moensaku Yor	KO	1 (6) 1:10	25 Jun 2023	Lalak Jan Stadium, Gilgit, Pakistan	
17	Win	14–2–1	Arnold Garde	TKO	1 (8) 1:43	25 Feb 2023	Calape Cultural Center, Calape, Philippines	
16	Win	13–2–1	Landi Ngxeke	TKO	2 (12), 1:41	23 Oct 2022	International Convention Centre, East London, South Africa	Won vacant WBO Inter-Continental super-flyweight title
15	Loss	12–2–1	Giemel Magramo	UD	12	23 Oct 2021	The Flash Grand Ballroom of the Elorde Sports Complex, Parañaque City, Philippines	For vacant OPBF flyweight title
14	Win	12–1–1	Jack Amisa	KO	1 (8) 0:50	22 Nov 2019	Caesars Palace Dubai, Dubai, United Arab Emirates	
13	Win	11–1–1	Takuya Kogawa	TKO	8 (12) 0:57	23 Aug 2019	Korakuen Hall, Tokyo, Japan	Retained OPBF flyweight title
12	Loss	10–1–1	Wulan Tuolehazi	UD	12	28 Sep 2018	Changsha Social work college gymnasium, Changsha, China	For vacant WBC Silver flyweight title
11	Win	10–0–1	Shun Kosaka	KO	4 (12) 1:20	27 May 2018	Big Wave, Wakayama, Japan	Retained OPBF flyweight title
10	Win	9–0–1	Keisuke Nakayama	KO	9 (12) 2:01	13 Mar 2018	Korakuen Hall, Tokyo, Japan	Won OPBF flyweight title
9	Win	8–0–1	Richard Rosales	MD	10	20 Oct 2017	Barangay Granada Covered Court, Bacolod, Philippines	Won vacant OPBF Silver flyweight title
8	Win	7–0–1	Elmer Liboon	TKO	1 (6) 2:29	27 May 2017	888 Chinatown Square Mall, Bacolod City, Philippines	
7	Draw	6–0–1	Glenne Calacar	SD	10	11 Feb 2017	Mandaluyong Elementary School, Mandaluyong City, Philippines	For vacant LuzProBA light-flyweight title
6	Win	6–0	Jimboy Haya	DQ	3 (10) 1:15	10 May 2015	Lazi Municipal Gym, Lazi, Philippines	Haya disqualified for repeated low blows
5	Win	5–0	Michael Bastasa	KO	1 (6)	20 Dec 2014	Plaza, Butuan, Philippines	
4	Win	4–0	Andro Debucas	SD	6	25 Oct 2014	Butuan, Agusan del Norte, Philippines	
3	Win	3–0	Rodante Suacasa	KO	1 (6) 0:10	20 Aug 2014	Culit Gym, Barangay Culit, Nasipit, Philippines	
2	Win	2–0	John Paul Safera	TKO	1 (4) 1:21	20 Jun 2014	Nasipit Gym, Nasipit, Philippines	
1	Win	1–0	Mark Cutara	TKO	1 (4) 1:30	31 Mar 2014	Nasipit Gym, Nasipit, Philippines	

== IBA professional boxing record ==
1 fight	0 wins	1 loss
By decision	0	1

No.	Result	Record	Opponent	Type	Round, time	Date	Location	Notes
1	Loss	0–1	Samat Zhetibayev	UD	8	12 Jul 2024	IBA Coliseum, Serpukhov, Russia	

== Titles in boxing ==
=== Regional/International titles ===
- OPBF flyweight champion (112 lbs)
- WBO Inter-continental super-flyweight champion (115 lbs)
- WBC Continental Americas super-flyweight champion (115 lbs)

=== Silver titles ===
- OPBF Silver flyweight champion (112 lbs)
