= Seigo Yuri Akui =

Japanese boxer (born 1995)

Seigo Yuri Akui 阿久井政悟
Personal information
- Born: Seigo Akui; 3 September 1995 (age 30) Kurashiki, Japan
- Height: 5 ft 4 in (163 cm)
- Weight: Light flyweight; Flyweight

Boxing career
- Stance: Orthodox

Boxing record
- Total fights: 27
- Wins: 23
- Win by KO: 13
- Losses: 3
- Draws: 1

Seigo Akui (Japanese: 阿久井政悟, Seigo Akui; born 3 September 1995), better known as Seigo Yuri Akui, is a Japanese professional boxer who held the World Boxing Association (WBA) flyweight title from 2024 to 2025.

== Personal life ==
He played association football until the first year of junior high school, when he took up boxing under the guidance of his father and uncle. He began his amateur career after entering Kurashiki Suisho High School, and competed in the second and third years.

== Professional boxing career ==
=== Light flyweight ===
==== First Rookie of the Year tournament ====
Akui had a short amateur career during which he amassed a 20–7 record, before making his debut at the age of 19. He made his debut against Yuki Sueyoshi on 20 April 2014, in the quarterfinals of the West Japan light flyweight Rookie of the Year tournament. He beat Sueyoshi by unanimous decision, with all three judges awarding him all four rounds of the fight. Akui was given an automatic pass for his semifinal bout, which was expected to take place in July 2014, as his opponent pulled withdrew. Akui faced the undefeated Michitaka Muto in the tournament finals on 14 September 2014. He won the fight by unanimous decision, with scores of 40–36, 39-37 and 39–37. Akui was furthermore crowned the tournament MVP.

Akui was scheduled to face another "Rookie of the Year" regional tournament winner Seita Ogido on 9 November 2014, for the All Japan Rookie of the Year title. The fight was ruled a draw, with two judges being split as to the winner, while the third judge scored it an even 38-38. Ogido was ruled the better fighter however, and advanced to the next round of the tournament.

==== Second Rookie of the Year tournament ====
Akui entered the 2015 West Japan Rookie of the Year light flyweight tournament as well, and was scheduled to face Ruka Shobu in the quarterfinals on 19 July 2015. He needed just 100 seconds to beat Shobu by technical knockout. Akui faced Kaminoko Okamura Kentokid in the tournament semifinals, held on 27 September 2015. He won the fight by a first-round knockout. Akui faced Nobuhiro Oshiro in the tournament finals on 15 November 2015. He won the fight by unanimous decision, with scores of 39–37, 39-38 and 39–38. Akui was once again given the West Japan MVP award. Akui was scheduled to fight Hiroki Hosoya for the All Japan Rookie of the Year light flyweight title on 20 December 2015. He won the five round bout by unanimous decision, with scores of 49–47, 48-47 and 48–47.

=== Flyweight ===
==== Move up to flyweight ====
After managing to win the Rookie tournament in his second try, Akui was scheduled to face Hideaki Yamaji on 3 April 2016, whom he beat by a knockout after just 45 seconds. It was his first fight at flyweight, with his previous fights taking place at 108 pounds. Akui was scheduled to fight his first eight-round bout against Yamato Uchinono on 2 October 2016. He didn't need all eight rounds however, as he stopped Uchinono at the mid-point of the third round. Akui faced a large step up in competition on 3 December 2016, when he scheduled to fight Kenji Ono on a G+ televised card. He won the fight by a first-round technical knockout.

Akui beat the 0-2 Nattawut Siritoem by a 31-second knockout on 16 April 2017. Akui was scheduled to face Ryuto Oho on 16 May 2017, in the semifinals of the Japanese Youth Flyweight four man tournament. He won the fight by a first-round technical knockout. Akui advanced to the tournament finals, held on 23 August 2017, where he faced Junto Nakatani. Nakatani made use of his greater height and reach to win the fight by a sixth-round technical knockout.

Akui was scheduled to face the future WBC light flyweight champion Masamichi Yabuki on 8 April 2018. He won the fight by a first-round knockout, stopping Yabuki 91 seconds into the fight. Akui was scheduled to fight the #10 ranked WBA flyweight contender Jaysever Abcede on 28 October 2018. Abcede won the fight by a late eight-round technical knockout. Akui rebounded from his second professional loss with a first-round technical knockout of Yoshiki Minato on 28 April 2019.

==== Japanese flyweight champion ====
Akui, at the time the #1 ranked flyweight by the Japanese Boxing Commission, was scheduled to face Shun Kosaka, at the time the #2 ranked flyweight by the JBC, for the vacant Japanese flyweight title on 27 October 2019. The bout was scheduled as the main event of a "Momotaro Fight Boxing 38" event, held at the Amakusa Park Gym in Asakuchi, Japan. He won the fight by a first-round technical knockout.

Akui was scheduled to make his first title defense against the #1 ranked JBC flyweight contender Seiya Fujikita on 18 October 2020. He won the fight by unanimous decision, with scores of 98–92, 97-93 and 99–91. Akui was scheduled to make his second title defense against Taku Kuwahara on 21 July 2021. He won the fight by a late tenth-round technical knockout.

Akui was booked to make his third title defense against the former Japanese flyweight champion Takuya Kogawa on 27 February 2022. He won the fight by unanimous decision, with all three judges scoring the fight 100–90 in his favor. Nearly a year later, on 11 January 2023, Akui vacated the Japanese flyweight title.

Akui faced the #14 ranked WBC light-flyweight contender Jayson Vayson in a ten-round flyweight bout on 4 February 2023. The bout headlined the "621st Dynamic Glove" event, which took place at the Korakuen Hall in Tokyo, Japan. He won the fight by unanimous decision, with all three judges awarding him every single round of the bout.

=== WBA flyweight champion ===
==== Akui vs. Dalakian ====
On August 4, 2023, the WBA formally ordered their flyweight champion Artem Dalakian to make a mandatory championship defense against Akui. The two camps were give a 30-day negotiation period to come to terms before a purse bid would be called, despite a WBA ruling that calls for a 60-day period. A purse bid was expected to take place on September 9, but was later cancelled, as the two camps came to an agreement on September 6. The championship bout was expected to take place at the Ryōgoku Kokugikan in Tokyo, Japan on November 15, 2023. As Takuma Inoue, who was booked to fight in the main event of the evening, suffered a rib injury, the entire event was cancelled on October 28, 2023. The Dalakian and Akui fight was accordingly re-scheduled to take place at the EDION Arena in Osaka, Japan on January 23, 2024. Akui won the fight by unanimous decision, with scores of 116–112, 117–111 and 119–109.

==== Akui vs. Kuwahara ====
Akui made his first title defense against the #3 ranked WBA flyweight contender Taku Kuwahara at the Tokyo Dome in Tokyo, Japan on May 6, 2024. Akui previously faced Kuwahara in a Japanese flyweight championship bout on July 21, 2021, when he twice knocked him down en route to winning the fight by a tenth-round technical knockout. He retained the championship by unanimous decision. Two of the ringside officials scored the fight 117–111 in his favor, while the third judge awarded Akui a slightly wider 118–110 scorecard.

==== Akui vs. Thananchai ====
Akui made his second title defense against #15 ranked WBA, #7 ranked WBO and WBC Thananchai Charunphak, the bout occurred as event "Prime Video Boxing 10" on October 14, 2024, at the Ariake Arena in Tokyo, Japan. He lost by stoppage in the final round.

=== Unified WBA and WBC Flyweight Championship ===
==== Akui vs. Teraji ====
Akui faced WBC flyweight champion Kenshiro Teraji in the championship unification at Ryogoku Kokugikan in Tokyo, Japan on March 13, 2025. Akui lost the fight and his WBA title by TKO in the 12th round.

== Professional boxing record ==
27 fights	23 wins	3 losses
By knockout	13	3
By decision	10	0
Draws	1	

No.	Result	Record	Opponent	Type	Round, time	Date	Location	Notes
26	Win	23–3–1	Lourinz Biasong	TKO	5 (19), 0:59	6 Jun 2026	Korakuen Hall, Tokyo, Japan	
25	Win	22–3–1	Vencent Lacar	KO	3 (8), 0:53	17 Dec 2025	Kokugikan, Tokyo, Japan	
25	Loss	21–3–1	Kenshiro Teraji	TKO	12 (12), 1:29	13 Mar 2025	Ryōgoku Kokugikan, Tokyo, Japan	Lost WBA flyweight title; For WBC flyweight title
24	Win	21–2–1	Thananchai Charunphak	SD	12	13 Oct 2024	Ariake Arena, Tokyo, Japan	Retained WBA flyweight title
23	Win	20–2–1	Taku Kuwahara	UD	12	6 May 2024	Tokyo Dome, Tokyo, Japan	Retained WBA flyweight title
22	Win	19–2–1	Artem Dalakian	UD	12	23 Jan 2024	EDION Arena, Osaka, Japan	Won WBA flyweight title
21	Win	18–2–1	Jayson Vayson	UD	10	4 Feb 2023	Korakuen Hall, Tokyo, Japan	
20	Win	17–2–1	Takuya Kogawa	UD	10	27 Feb 2022	Suntopia, Soja, Japan	Retained Japanese flyweight title
19	Win	16–2–1	Taku Kuwahara	TKO	10 (10), 2:49	21 Jul 2021	Korakuen Hall, Tokyo, Japan	Retained Japanese flyweight title
18	Win	15–2–1	Seiya Fujikita	UD	10	18 Oct 2020	Amakusa Park Gym, Asakuchi, Japan	Retained Japanese flyweight title
17	Win	14–2–1	Shun Kosaka	TKO	1 (10), 2:16	27 Oct 2019	Amakusa Park Gym, Asakuchi, Japan	Won vacant Japanese flyweight title
16	Win	13–2–1	Yoshiki Minato	TKO	1 (8), 2:45	28 Apr 2019	Suntopia, Sōja, Japan	
15	Loss	12–2–1	Jaysever Abcede	TKO	8 (8), 2:17	28 Oct 2018	Suntopia, Sōja, Japan	
14	Win	12–1–1	Masamichi Yabuki	TKO	1 (8), 1:32	8 Apr 2018	Suntopia, Sōja, Japan	
13	Loss	11–1–1	Junto Nakatani	TKO	6 (8), 2:01	23 Aug 2017	Korakuen Hall, Tokyo, Japan	For inaugural Japanese Youth flyweight title
12	Win	11–0–1	Ryuto Oho	TKO	1 (6), 1:33	16 May 2017	Korakuen Hall, Tokyo, Japan	
11	Win	10–0–1	Nattawut Siritoem	KO	1 (8), 0:31	16 Apr 2017	Suntopia, Sōja, Japan	
10	Win	9–0–1	Kenji Ono	TKO	1 (8), 2:03	3 Dec 2016	Korakuen Hall, Tokyo, Japan	
9	Win	8–0–1	Yamato Uchinono	TKO	3 (8), 1:30	2 Oct 2016	Suntopia, Sōja, Japan	
8	Win	7–0–1	Hideaki Yamaji	KO	1 (6), 0:45	3 Apr 2016	Health Welfare Center, Asakuchi, Japan	
7	Win	6–0–1	Hiroki Hosoya	UD	5	20 Dec 2015	Korakuen Hall, Tokyo, Japan	Won All Japan Rookie of the Year light-flyweight title
6	Win	5–0–1	Nobuhiro Oshiro	UD	4	15 Nov 2015	Osaka Prefectural Gymnasium, Osaka, Japan	Won West Japan Rookie of the Year light-flyweight title
5	Win	4–0–1	Kaminoko Okamura Kentokid	KO	1 (4), 2:42	27 Sep 2015	Osaka Prefectural Gymnasium, Osaka, Japan	
4	Win	3–0–1	Ruka Shobu	TKO	1 (4), 1:40	19 Jul 2015	Incubation Center, Amagasaki, Japan	
3	Draw	2–0–1	Seita Ogido	SD	4	9 Nov 2014	Osaka Prefectural Gymnasium, Osaka, Japan	
2	Win	2–0	Michitaka Muto	UD	4	14 Sep 2014	Osaka Prefectural Gymnasium, Osaka, Japan	Won West Japan Rookie of the Year light-flyweight title
1	Win	1–0	Yuki Sueyoshi	UD	4	20 Apr 2014	Sambo Hall, Kobe, Japan	

== See also ==
- Boxing in Japan
- List of Japanese boxing world champions
- List of world flyweight boxing champions

Sporting positions
Regional boxing titles
Vacant Title last held by Junto Nakatani	Japanese flyweight champion 27 October 2019 – 2022; Vacated	Vacant Title next held by Josuke Nagata
World boxing titles
Preceded by Artem Dalakian	WBA flyweight champion 23 January 2024 – present	Incumbent
