= Ryota Yamauchi =

Japanese boxer (born 1995)

Ryota Yamauchi 山内涼太
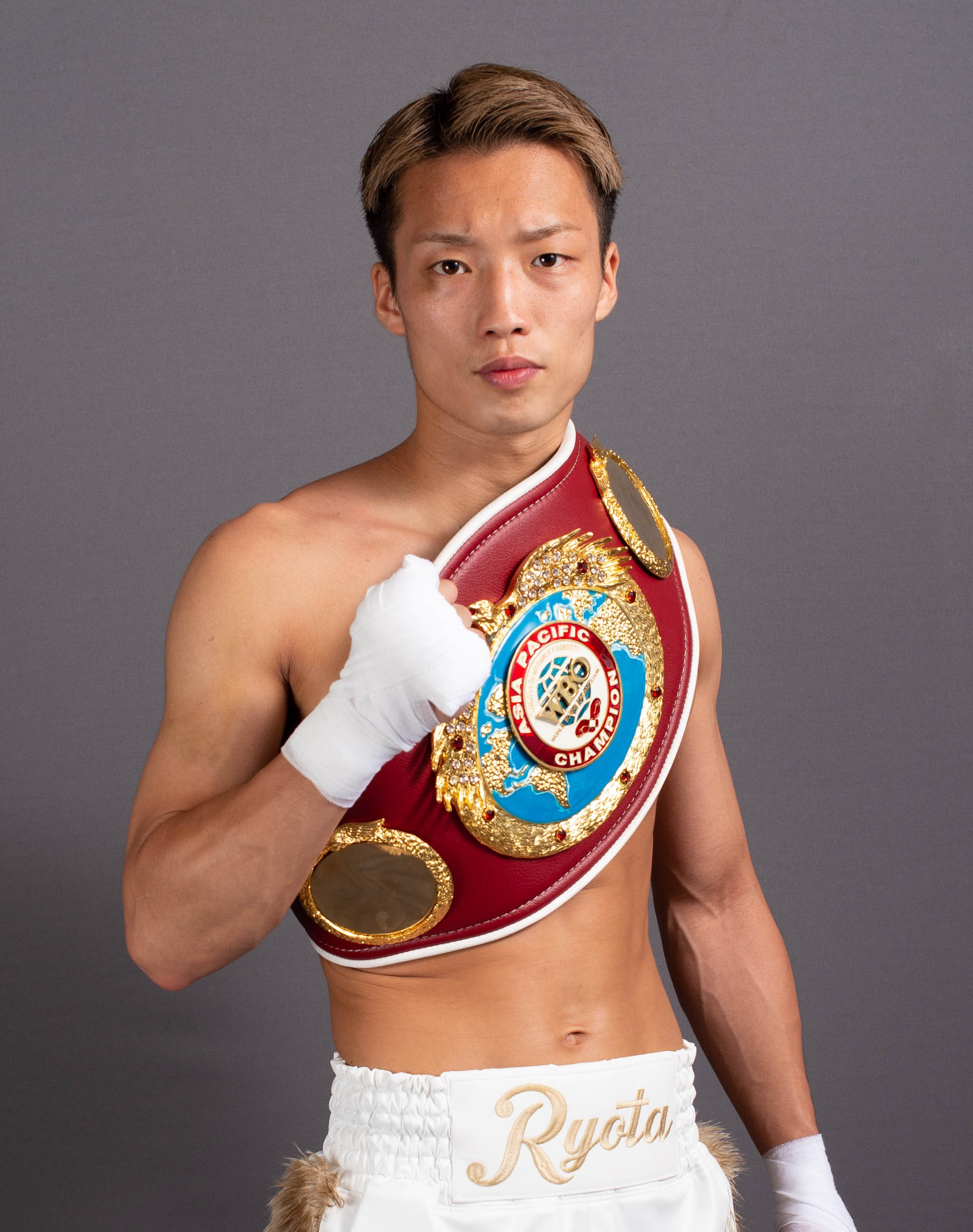

Personal information
- Nationality: Japanese
- Born: 15 January 1995 (age 31) Toyonaka, Japan
- Height: 5 ft 5 in (165 cm)
- Weight: Flyweight

Boxing career
- Stance: Southpaw

Boxing record
- Total fights: 15
- Wins: 12
- Win by KO: 11
- Losses: 3

Ryota Yamauchi (Japanese: 山内涼太, Yamauchi Ryota; born 15 January 1995) is a Japanese professional boxer.

== Professional boxing career ==
Yamauchi made his professional debut against Supaluek Noiwaengphim on 30 June 2017, whom he beat by a second-round knockout. Yamauchi next fought the journeyman Lester Abutan on 19 December 2017. He won the fight by a fourth-round technical knockout.

Yamauchi was scheduled to fight Yota Hori on May 7, 2018, in his third professional appearance. He won the fight by a fifth-round technical knockout. Yamauchi next fought Rio Nainggolan on 1 October 2018, and won by a third-round stoppage, as Nainggolan retired from the fight at the end of the round.

Yamauchi was scheduled to fight Wulan Tuolehazi for the vacant WBA International flyweight title on 30 March 2019. It was his first professional title fight, his first twelve-round fight, as well as his first fight outside of Japan. Yamauchi suffered his first professional defeat, as Tuolehazi won the fight by unanimous decision. Yamauchi was next scheduled to face the WBA Asian flyweight champion, and #13 ranked WBA flyweight conteder, Alphoe Dagayloan on 23 August 2019. He won the fight by majority decision. Yamauchi faced another Philippine opponent, MJ Bo, on 14 February 2020. He won the fight by a second-round knockout.

Yamauchi was booked to fight his fellow countryman Satoru Todaka for the vacant WBO Asia Pacific flyweight title on 19 August 2020. Todaka retired from the bout at the end of the third round. Yamauchi made his first title defense against Yuta Nakayama on 24 June 2021. He won the fight by a seventh-round technical knockout.

Yamauchi challenged the reigning WBO flyweight champion Junto Nakatani, in what was Nakatani's second title defense. The title fight was scheduled for the undercard of the Ryota Murata and Gennadiy Golovkin middleweight unification bout, which took place on 9 April 2022 at the Saitama Super Arena in Saitama, Japan. He lost the fight by an eight-round technical knockout, due to referee stoppage, after having lost all the preceding rounds on the judges' scorecards.

Yamauchi faced Josuke Nagata for the vacant Japanese flyweight title on 1 April 2023. He lost the fight by unanimous decision, with all three judges scoring the bout 96–94 in favor of Nagata.

== Professional boxing record ==
15 fights	12 wins	3 losses
By knockout	11	1
By decision	1	2

No.	Result	Record	Opponent	Type	Round, time	Date	Location	Notes
15	Win	12–3	Yasuhiro Kanzaki	TKO	6 (8), 1:45	7 Jun 2024	Korakuen Hall, Tokyo, Japan	
14	Win	11–3	Arnold Garde	KO	2 (8), 1:16	2 Feb 2024	Korakuen Hall, Tokyo, Japan	
13	Win	10–3	Jakpan Sangtong	KO	2 (8), 1:10	24 Aug 2023	Korakuen Hall, Tokyo, Japan	
12	Loss	9–3	Josuke Nagata	UD	10	1 Apr 2023	Korakuen Hall, Tokyo, Japan	For vacant Japanese flyweight title
11	Win	9–2	Parinya Khaikanha	TKO	1 (8), 2:59	11 Aug 2022	Korakuen Hall, Tokyo, Japan	
10	Loss	8–2	Junto Nakatani	TKO	8 (12)	9 Apr 2022	Saitama Super Arena, Saitama, Japan	For WBO flyweight title
9	Win	8–1	Yuta Nakayama	TKO	7 (12), 1:29	24 Jun 2021	Korakuen Hall, Tokyo, Japan	Retained WBO Asia Pacific flyweight title
8	Win	7–1	Satoru Todaka	RTD	3 (12), 3:00	19 Aug 2020	Korakuen Hall, Tokyo, Japan	Won vacant WBO Asia Pacific flyweight title
7	Win	6–1	MJ Bo	KO	2 (8), 2:24	14 Feb 2020	Korakuen Hall, Tokyo, Japan	
6	Win	5–1	Alphoe Dagayloan	MD	8	23 Aug 2019	Korakuen Hall, Tokyo, Japan	
5	Loss	4–1	Wulan Tuolehazi	UD	12	30 Mar 2019	PuTuo Stadium, Shanghai, China	For vacant WBA International flyweight title
4	Win	4–0	Rio Nainggolan	RTD	3 (8), 3:00	1 Oct 2018	Korakuen Hall, Tokyo, Japan	
3	Win	3–0	Yota Hori	TKO	5 (8), 1:32	7 May 2018	Korakuen Hall, Tokyo, Japan	
2	Win	2–0	Lester Abutan	TKO	4 (6), 2:26	19 Dec 2017	Korakuen Hall, Tokyo, Japan	
1	Win	1–0	Supaluek Noiwaengphim	KO	2 (6), 2:47	30 Jun 2017	Korakuen Hall, Tokyo, Japan	
