= Ardin Diale =

Filipino boxer

Personal information
- Nickname: The Jackal
- Nationality: Filipino
- Born: Ardin Bayata Diale; August 23, 1988 (age 37) Malungon, Sarangani, Philippines
- Height: 160 cm (5 ft 3 in)
- Weight: Flyweight

Boxing career
- Stance: Orthodox

Boxing record
- Total fights: 56
- Wins: 35
- Win by KO: 17
- Losses: 17
- Draws: 4

Ardin Bayata Diale (born 23 August 1988) is a professional boxer from the Philippines who challenged for the WBO flyweight title in 2011, losing to Julio César Miranda by technical knockout. Later on, Diale has settled into a gatekeeper role, holding losses to Juan Francisco Estrada, Koki Eto, and Daigo Higa.

Diale has held the OPBF title between 2015 and 2016. He won the title by beating Renoel Pael by unanimous decision, and defended it successfully once before losing to Higa. Diale has also held the WBC International, Games and Amusements Board, and WBO Oriental flyweight titles at other points in his career.

== Professional boxing record ==
58 fights	35 wins	19 losses
By knockout	17	8
By decision	18	11
Draws	4	

No.	Result	Record	Opponent	Type	Round, time	Date	Location	Notes
58	Loss	35–19–4	(United States) Christian Carto	KO	2 (8), 1:09	12 Jan 2024	(United States) Live! Casino & Hotel, Philadelphia, Pennsylvania, U.s.	
57	Loss	35–18–4	(Philippines) Gary Tamayo	KO	2 (10), 2:59	30 Mar 2023	Balon Bayambang Events Center, Bayambang, Philippines	
56	Loss	35–17–4	(Philippines) Alvin Medura	MD	10	29 Oct 2021	The Grand Flash Ballroom of the Elorde Sports Complex, Parañaque, Philippines	
55	Loss	35–16–4	(Japan) Yusuke Mine	UD	8	22 Dec 2019	Sumiyoshi Ward Center, Osaka, Japan	
54	Loss	35–15–4	(Kazakhstan) Yelshat Nikhemttolla	UD	8	12 Oct 2019	Grand Park, Almaty, Kazakhstan	
53	Loss	35–14–4	(China) Wulan Tuolehazi	MD	12	26 May 2019	Fuzhou, China	For WBA International flyweight title
52	Win	35–13–4	(Philippines) Richard Rosales	RTD	3 (8), 3:00	8 Mar 2019	Angono Sports Complex, Barangay Mahabang, Angono, Philippines	
51	Loss	34–13–4	(Philippines) Jonas Sultan	UD	10	24 Nov 2018	IEC Convention Center, Cebu City, Philippines	
50	Win	34–12–4	(Philippines) Cris Alfante	MD	12	7 Jul 2018	SM Mall of Asia Music Hall, Pasay, Philippines	Won WBC Asian Boxing Council Continental flyweight title
49	Loss	33–12–4	(South Africa) Moruti Mthalane	TKO	2 (12)	27 Oct 2017	Mmabatho Convention Centre, Mmabatho, South Africa	For vacant IBF International flyweight title
48	Win	33–11–4	(Philippines) Wiljan Ubagniel	RTD	1 (8)	27 Jun 2017	Makati Cinema Square Arena, Makati, Philippines	
47	Loss	32–11–4	(United Kingdom) Andrew Selby	UD	10	4 Feb 2017	(United Kingdom) Lee Valley VeloPark, London, England	Lost WBC International flyweight title
46	Win	32–10–4	(Philippines) Michael Enriquez	UD	12	3 Dec 2016	Puerto Princesa Coliseum, Puerto Princesa, Philippines	Won vacant WBC International flyweight title
45	Draw	31–10–4	(Philippines) Ryan Lumacad	TD	4 (12), 0:36	30 Sep 2016	Strike Coliseum, Bacoor, Philippines	
44	Loss	31–10–3	(Japan) Daigo Higa	KO	4 (12), 2:39	2 Jul 2016	Korakuen Hall, Tokyo, Japan	Lost OPBF flyweight title
43	Win	31–9–3	(Philippines) Jonathan Francisco	UD	12	20 Feb 2016	Sports Complex, Taguig, Philippines	Retained OPBF flyweight title
42	Win	30–9–3	(Philippines) Renoel Pael	UD	12	2 Dec 2015	Highway Hills Integrated School, Mandaluyong, Philippines	Won vacant OPBF flyweight title
41	Win	29–9–3	(Indonesia) Heri Amol	RTD	6 (10)	11 Jul 2015	Mandaluyong Gym, Mandaluyong, Philippines	
40	Win	28–9–3	(Japan) Yuta Matsuo	SD	8	10 May 2015	Korakuen Hall, Tokyo, Japan	
