= Gennady Golovkin vs. Ryōta Murata =

Boxing competition

Big Drama in Japan
- Date: April 9, 2022
- Venue: Saitama Super Arena, Saitama City, Saitama, Japan
- Title(s) on the line: WBA (Super), IBF, and IBO middleweight titles

Tale of the tape
Boxer	Gennady Golovkin	Ryōta Murata
Nickname	GGG	Golden Fist
Hometown	Karaganda, Kazakhstan	Nara City, Nara, Japan
Pre-fight record	41–1–1 (36 KO)	16–2 (13 KO)
Height	5 ft 10 1/2 in (179 cm)	6 ft (183 cm)
Weight	160 lb (73 kg)	160 lb (73 kg)
Style	Orthodox	Orthodox
Recognition	IBF and IBO middleweight champion	WBA (Super) middleweight champion

Result
- Golovkin wins via 9th round TKO

Gennady Golovkin vs. Ryōta Murata, billed as Big Drama in Japan, was a middleweight unification professional boxing match contested between IBF and IBO champion, Gennady Golovkin and WBA (Super) champion, Ryōta Murata. The bout took place at Saitama Super Arena, Saitama, Japan on April 9, 2022.

== Background ==
After multiple rumors of a middleweight unification match between titlists Gennady Golovkin and Ryōta Murata, it was announced on October 27, 2021 that a deal had finally been agreed between the two to stage the bout in the latter's home country of Japan, at the Saitama Super Arena on December 29, 2021. However, the bout was postponed due to Japan closing its borders because of the COVID-19 Omicron variant. It was later rescheduled on April 9, 2022.

Golovkin is a two-time middleweight champion, having held the IBF and IBO titles since defeating Sergiy Derevyanchenko in a fight of the year contender in 2019. He previously held the unified WBA (Super), WBC, IBF and IBO titles between 2014 and 2018, in addition to being ranked as the world's best boxer, pound for pound, from September 2017 to September 2018 by The Ring magazine. Prior to the bout against Murata, he made a record 21st middleweight title defense against Kamil Szeremeta on December 18, 2020.

Murata is an Olympic gold medalist, having claimed gold at the 2012 Summer Olympics. As a professional, he has defeated every opponent he has faced, having avenged decision losses against Hassan N'Dam N'Jikam and Rob Brant with stoppage victories.

== The fight ==
Murata started fast and seemed to control the pace for some of the early rounds until Golovkin took over by the mid-rounds. Golovkin inflicted tremendous punishment on Murata in round eight. The end came in round nine when after a hard right hand dropped Murata, the Japanese's corner threw in their towel, giving Golovkin a ninth-round technical knockout win.

== Fight card ==
Weight Class		vs.		Method	Round	Time	Notes
Middleweight	(Kazakhstan) Gennady Golovkin (c)	def.	(Japan) Ryōta Murata (c)	TKO	9/12	2:11	^{Note 1}
Lightweight	(Japan) Shuichiro Yoshino (c)	def.	(Japan) Masayuki Ito	TD	11/12	2:20	^{Note 2}
Flyweight	(Japan) Junto Nakatani (c)	def.	(Japan) Ryota Yamauchi	TKO	8/12	2:20	^{Note 3}
Super bantamweight	(Japan) Kazuki Anaguchi	def.	(Japan) Ryuji Yamamoto	TKO	3/6	0:56
Welterweight	(Japan) Taiga Kato	def.	(Japan) Hiroka Amaki	UD	4/4

^Note 1 For WBA (Super), IBF, and IBO middleweight titles
^Note 3 For WBO Asia Pacific and OPBF lightweight titles
^Note 3 For WBO flyweight title

== Broadcasting ==
Country/Region	Free-to-air	Cable/Satellite	PPV	Stream
Japan (host)	—N/a			Amazon Prime
Kazakhstan	Qazaqstan, Qazsport	—N/a		TBA
South Korea	—N/a	SPOTV	—N/a	SPOTV NOW
Worldwide	—N/a			DAZN^{excl.}

^excl. Live on DAZN worldwide, excluding Japan, Kazakhstan and South Korea
