= Eaktwan BTU Ruaviking =

Thai boxer

Ektawan
Personal information
- Nickname: To (โต้)
- Nationality: Thai
- Born: Komgrich Nantapech; July 24, 1989 (age 36) Kalasin Province, Thailand
- Height: 5 ft 3 in (1.60 m)
- Weight: Flyweight

Boxing career
- Stance: Orthodox

Boxing record
- Total fights: 63
- Wins: 42
- Win by KO: 32
- Losses: 20
- Draws: 1

Komgrich Nantapech (Thai: คมกฤช นันทเพชร), also better known as Eaktwan BTU Ruawaiking (เอกตะวัน บีทียูเรือไวกิ้ง) or Ektawan Mor Krungthep Thonburi (เอกตะวัน ม.กรุงเทพธนบุรี; born July 24, 1989), is a Thai professional boxer who challenged for the IBF flyweight title in 2017.

== Career ==
Eaktawan was a Muay Thai fighter under the name Tawanrung Ueasamphan at first. He moved to boxing full time in 2013. A former Thai Flyweight champion and the current IBF Pan-Pacific flyweight champion, on April 29, 2017, Nantapech was the #4 IBF Flyweight, he challenged the #3 Donnie Nietes for the vacant IBF World Title vacated by then Champion Johnriel Casimero.

His ring name "Eaktawan" (lit. Solitary Sun) comes from his manager Ekarat and his supporter Ekachai Leuang Sa-Ard, he studied at the Faculty of Political Science, Bangkokthonburi University.

== Professional boxing record ==
63 fights	42 wins	20 losses
By knockout	32	13
By decision	10	7
Draws	1	

No.	Result	Record	Opponent	Type	Round, time	Date	Location	Notes
63	Loss	42–20–1	(Philippines) Jesse Espinas	TKO	1 (6)	2026-03-28	World Siam Stadium, Bangkok, Thailand	
62	Win	42–19–1	(Thailand) Thanatorn Plamsak	TKO	2 (6), 0:29	2026-01-25	Thai Payak Boxing Gym, Pathum Thani, Thailand	
61	Loss	41–19–1	(United States) JV Tuazon	RTD	4 (8), 3:00	2025-11-30	Triam Udom Suksa School, Bangkok, Thailand	
60	Win	41–18–1	(Thailand) Akarapon Dada	TKO	1 (4), 1:18	2025-11-15	Triam Udom Suksa School, Bangkok, Thailand	
59	Loss	40–18–1	(Japan) Toshihiko Era	TKO	2 (12), 2:01	2025-09-28	Highland Boxing, Bangkok, Thailand	For vacant WBF (Foundation) flyweight title
58	Win	40–17–1	(Thailand) Natthaphat Thangsalai	TKO	1 (6), 2:40	2025-09-20	Thai Payak Boxing Gym, Pathum Thani, Thailand	
57	Loss	39–17–1	(China) Zeyuan Cheng	UD	8	2025-08-26	Suan Lum Night Bazaar Ratchadaphisek, Bangkok, Thailand	For vacant WBC-ABCO Continental light flyweight title
56	Win	39–16–1	(Thailand) Jinnawat Rienpith	TKO	1 (8), 2:40	2025-08-10	Singmanassak Muaythai School, Pathum Thani, Thailand	
55	Loss	38–16–1	(Japan) Toshihiko Era	RTD	4 (10), 3:00	2025-06-22	Highland Boxing, Bangkok, Thailand	For vacant Thai, WBF (Foundation) Asia Pacific and ABF flyweight titles
54	Loss	38–15–1	(Philippines) John Michael Zulueta	KO	3 (10), 1:49	2025-05-25	SMX Convention Center, Bacolod, Philippines	For vacant ABF flyweight title
53	Win	38–14–1	(Myanmar) Ne Lin Aung	TKO	2 (6), 1:05	2025-04-06	Thai Payak Boxing Gym, Pathum Thani, Thailand	
52	Loss	37–14–1	(Japan) Katsuya Murakami	KO	9 (10), 0:50	2025-03-03	World Siam Stadium, Bangkok, Thailand	For vacant OPBF Silver super flyweight title
51	Draw	37–13–1	(Hong Kong) Raymond Poon KaiChing	SD	10	2024-12-26	Spaceplus Bangkok RCA, Bangkok, Thailand	For vacant WBC-ABCO Continental light flyweight title
50	Win	37–13	(Thailand) Jinnawat Rienpith	TKO	1 (6), 2:49	2024-12-08	Wat Pak Bo School, Bangkok, Thailand	
49	Loss	36–13	(England) Marcel Braithwaite	KO	1 (6), 0:58	2024-09-06	(United Arab Emirates) Hilton Al Habtoor City, Dubai, UAE	
48	Loss	36–12	(Thailand) Tanes Ongjunta	TKO	6 (10), 3:00	2024-08-03	Spaceplus Bangkok RCA, Bangkok, Thailand	For vacant WBA Asia flyweight title
47	Win	36–11	(Thailand) Natthaphong Nuchaiyaphum	TKO	3 (6), 2:21	2024-07-06	Spaceplus Bangkok RCA, Bangkok, Thailand	
46	Loss	35–11	(Philippines) Jayr Raquinel	TKO	2 (6), 1:13	2024-05-30	Spaceplus Bangkok RCA, Bangkok, Thailand	
45	Win	35–10	(Thailand) Wachirawit Sanpakorn	TKO	3 (6), 0:43	2024-02-10	Akethawee Muaythai Gym, Nakhon Pathom, Thailand	
44	Win	34–10	(Thailand) Naruenat Chaitiap	TKO	3 (6), 0:19	2024-01-29	Sasakul Gym, Lam Luk Ka, Thailand	
43	Win	33–10	(Thailand) Naruenat Chaitiap	UD	6	2023-12-17	Khongsittha Muaythai, Bangkok, Thailand	
42	Loss	32–10	(Thailand) Anuchai Donsua	TKO	4 (10), 2:26	2023-11-22	Rangsit International Stadium, Pathum Thani, Thailand	For ABF super bantamweight title
41	Loss	32–9	(Philippines) Herlan Gomez	KO	1 (10), 2:48	2023-08-31	Spaceplus Bangkok RCA, Bangkok, Thailand	For vacant WBC-ABCO Silver bantamweight title
40	Win	32–8	(Thailand) Watcharaphon Saraphai	TKO	6 (6), 1:07	2023-07-27	Spaceplus Bangkok RCA, Bangkok, Thailand	
39	Loss	31–8	(Thailand) Thananchai Charunphak	UD	8	2023-06-24	Suan Lum Night Bazaar Ratchadaphisek, Bangkok, Thailand	
38	Loss	31–7	(Thailand) Srisaket Sor Rungvisai	UD	8	2023-05-27	Thupatemi Stadium, Pathum Thani, Thailand	
37	Loss	31–6	(Philippines) Carl Jammes Martin	KO	2 (10)	2022-12-17	CCDC Gym, Barangay Poblacion, La Trinidad, Philippines	For vacant IBF Pan Pacific super bantamweight title
36	Win	31–5	(Thailand) Petchsaifah Chainat	TKO	2 (8)	2022-08-19	Lake Event, Samut Prakan, Thailand	
35	Win	30–5	(Thailand) Watcharaphon Chaisai	TKO	2 (8)	2021-03-19	Kiatkeerin Fitness and Martial Art, Samut Prakan, Thailand	
34	Win	29–5	(Thailand) Narit Nankaew	RTD	2 (6)	2020-12-09	Kiatkeerin Fitness and Martial Art, Samut Prakan, Thailand	
33	Win	28–5	(Thailand) Chiraphon Patitangkho	RTD	3 (6)	2020-09-03	Kiatkeerin Fitness and Martial Art, Samut Prakan, Thailand	
32	Win	27–5	(Thailand) Patiyut Seerachrakanon	TKO	3 (6)	2019-12-19	Kiatkeerin Fitness and Martial Art, Samut Prakan, Thailand	
31	Win	26–5	(Thailand) Wisitsak Saiwaew	TKO	2 (6)	2019-11-15	Ratirat Villege, Bangbuathong, Nonthaburi, Thailand	
30	Win	25–5	(Philippines) Rollen Del Castillo	TKO	2 (6)	2018-12-14	Maejo University, Chiang Mai, Thailand	
29	Win	24–5	(Philippines) Crison Omayao	UD	12	2018-04-25	(Thailand) Pone Kingpetch Memorial Park, Hua Hin	Retained IBF Pan Pacific flyweight title
28	Win	23–5	(Japan) Naoki Mochizuki	UD	12	2018-02-07	Suamlum Night Bazaar, Ratchadaphisek, Bangkok, Thailand	Won vacant IBF Pan Pacific flyweight title
27	Loss	22–5	(Argentina) Juan Carlos Reveco	UD	12	2017-09-08	Estadio Deportistas Alvearenses, General Alvear, Mendoza, Argentina	
26	Loss	22–4	(Philippines) Donnie Nietes	UD	12	2017-04-29	Cebu City Waterfront Hotel & Casino, Barangay Lahug, Cebu City, Cebu, Philippines	For vacant IBF flyweight title
25	Win	22–3	(Philippines) Jeny Boy Boca	KO	6 (12)	2016-09-30	Bangkok University, Thonburi Campus, Bangkok, Thailand	Retained IBF Asia flyweight title
24	Win	21–3	(Indonesia) Demsi Manufoe	KO	3 (12)	2016-08-12	Wiang Sa, Surat Thani, Thailand	Retained IBF Asia flyweight title
23	Win	20–3	(Philippines) Jayar Diama	UD	12	2016-07-08	Samroiyod Beach, Prachuap Khiri Khan, Thailand	Retained IBF Asia flyweight title
22	Win	19–3	(Japan) Takayuki Okumoto	SD	8	2016-04-03	EDION Arena Osaka, Osaka, Japan	
21	Win	18–3	(China) Yang Chen	TKO	3 (6)	2016-03-26	J-Night Market, Ladplakao, Bangkok, Thailand	
20	Win	17–3	(Philippines) Jomar Fajardo	TKO	6 (6)	2015-10-25	Central Westgate Shopping Center, Bangyai, Nonthaburi, Thailand	
19	Win	16–3	(Indonesia) Frans Damur Palue	UD	6	2015-08-12	Royal Square, Bangkok, Thailand	
18	Win	15–3	(Philippines) Lionel Legada	TKO	5 (12)	2015-06-19	Bangkok University, Thonburi Campus, Bangkok, Thailand	Won vacant IBF Asia flyweight title
17	Win	14–3	(Indonesia) Ardi Tefa	TKO	3 (12)	2015-03-13	Bangkok University, Thonburi Campus, Bangkok, Thailand	Retained WBA Asia flyweight title
16	Win	13–3	(Indonesia) Ical Tobida	TKO	4 (12)	2014-12-05	Royal Square, Bangkok, Thailand	Retained WBA Asia flyweight title
15	Win	12–3	(Philippines) Edison Berwela	TKO	4 (12)	2014-10-03	Bangkok University, Thonburi Campus, Bangkok, Thailand	Retained WBA Asia flyweight title
14	Win	11–3	(Indonesia) Gaspar Ampolo	KO	3 (6)	2014-09-05	Pakkret School, Nonthaburi, Thailand	
13	Win	10–3	(Indonesia) Jemmy Gobel	TKO	6 (12)	2014-06-13	Bangkok University, Thonburi Campus, Bangkok, Thailand	Won vacant WBA Asia flyweight title
12	Win	9–3	(Philippines) Renz Llagas	KO	3 (6)	2014-02-25	Bangkok University, Thonburi Campus, Bangkok, Thailand	
11	Win	8–3	(Philippines) Jimmy Masangkay	UD	6	2013-12-06	Krungthep Thonburi University, Bangkok, Thailand	
10	Loss	7–3	(Philippines) Froilan Saludar	UD	10	2013-10-26	Makati Coliseum, Makati City, Metro Manila, Philippines	
9	Win	7–2	(Thailand) Velasak Samsee	TKO	2 (10)	2013-10-11	Kruasawaeng Seafood Restaurant, Bangkhuntien, Bangkok, Thailand	Won vacant Thai flyweight title
8	Win	6–2	(Thailand) Chamuakpetch Kor Kamolwat	TKO	2 (6)	2013-09-17	Bangkok University, Thonburi Campus, Bangkok, Thailand	
7	Loss	5–2	(Japan) Sho Ishida	UD	8	2013-05-08	Bodymaker Colosseum, Osaka, Osaka, Japan	
6	Loss	5–1	(Philippines) Albert Pagara	KO	2 (10)	2012-11-15	Maasin City Sports Complex (Maasin City Gym), Maasin City, Southern Leyte, Philippines	
5	Win	5–0	(Thailand) Kong Sithsamart	TKO	1 (6)	2012-07-24	Chiang Rai, Thailand	
4	Win	4–0	(Thailand) Den Sithsaithong	UD	6	2012-03-28	Na-ngua village, Petchaboon, Thailand	
3	Win	3–0	(Thailand) Chartphichit Sor Rathidech	UD	6	2011-12-30	Krungthep Thonburi University, Bangkok, Thailand	
2	Win	2–0	(Thailand) Khaosainoi Or Nanthasrinon	UD	6	2011-10-17	Krungthep Thonburi University, Bangkok, Thailand	
1	Win	1–0	(Thailand) Tepparith Sor Thanmajak	KO	1 (6)	2011-08-03	Rajadamnern Stadium, Bangkok, Thailand	Professional debut.

== Muay Thai record ==
Muay Thai record
Date	Result	Opponent	Event	Location	Method	Round	Time
2023-07-22	Loss	(Japan) Issei Ishii	Rajadamnern World Series	Bangkok, Thailand	KO (Left hook to the body)	1	2:49
2013-07-21	Loss	(Japan) Mutsuki Ebata	SNKA MAGNUM 32	Tokyo, Japan	TKO (Punches)	2	1:15
2013-03-04	Loss	(Thailand) Yadfa K.R.S. Gym	Petchaophraya, Rajadamnern Stadium	Bangkok, Thailand	Decision	5	3:00
2013-02-01	Win	(Thailand) Jomyutjiew Wor.Rungtawee	Lumpinee Stadium	Bangkok, Thailand	KO	3	
2012-12-05	Win	(Thailand) Phetsayam Jitmuangnon.		Prachuap Khiri Khan province, Thailand	KO	2	
2012-09-24	Loss	(Thailand) Chankrit Ekbangsai	Petchaophraya, Rajadamnern Stadium	Bangkok, Thailand	KO	3	
Legend: Win Loss Draw/No contest Notes

== See also ==
- List of IBF world champions
- List of flyweight boxing champions
