= Thananchai Charunphak =

Thai boxer (born 2000)

Thananchai Charunphak ธนันท์ชัย จรูญภักดิ์
Personal information
- Nickname: King Cobra
- Born: Thananchai Charunphak; 16 April 2000 (age 26) Ubon Ratchathani, Thailand
- Height: 166 cm (5 ft 5 in)
- Weight: Flyweight

Boxing career
- Reach: 67 in (170 cm)
- Stance: Orthodox

Boxing record
- Total fights: 35
- Wins: 33
- Win by KO: 16
- Losses: 2
- Draws: 0
- No contests: 0

Thananchai Charunphak (Thai: ธนันท์ชัย จรูญภักดิ์, born: April 16, 2000) is a Thai professional boxer.

== Career ==
He was born in Ubon Ratchathani and his personal nickname is "O". He started boxing in 2020 under Surachart Pisitwuttinan's Nakornloung Promotion, which has already featured world champion boxers including Veeraphol Sahaprom, Srisaket Sor Rungvisai. Thananchai was able to defeat many skilled Thai boxers were Kompayak Porpramook, Eaktwan BTU Ruaviking, Samartlek Kokietgym. One of them made him the WBC Asia flyweight champion.

On August 12, 2024, he traveled to Japan, his first fight abroad. He was able to defeat Kento Hatanaka, WBO Asia Pacific flyweight champion by unanimous decision via 12 rounds.

After winning and getting the title, Surachart was interviewed and said, he himself was determined to make Thananchai a world champion by the end of this year, with the goal of heading to the WBO flyweight champion, which Anthony Olascuaga reigns over.

== Seigo Yuri Akui vs. Thananchai Charunphak ==
After making a name for himself by winning the WBO Asia Pacific champion in Japan, Thananchai was invited to travel to Japan again to fight for the WBA flyweight world title against Seigo Yuri Akui, a local champion. The event was held on October 13, 2024, at Tokyo's Ariake Coliseum as part of a world championship quadruple-header that saw the main event Seiya Tsutsumi defeated fellow-countryman Takuma Inoue to win the WBA bantamweight title after the pair traded blows for 12 action-packed rounds, and Kenshiro Teraji TKO Nicaragua's Cristofer Rosales in the 11th round for vacant WBC flyweight champion, with Shokichi Iwata TKO Spain's Jairo Noriega in the third round for vacant WBO light flyweight crown.

As #8 ranked WBA flyweight and WBO Asia Pacific flyweight champion, with only a little over a month to prepare, before the fight, Thananchai announced that he would snatch the belt back because it used to belong to Saen Sor Ploenchit, a senior boxer that he admired. In the actual bout, Thananchai turned out to be a far more formidable challenger than anyone had anticipated. He stood his ground and repeatedly countered the forward-charging Akui with crisp, well-placed punches. The tenth round was his most dominant—he hammered Akui with a flurry of vicious body shots that clearly staggered him and backed him up for the first time in the fight.

The result was that Thananchai lost by a split decision from three judges, 115–113, 113–115, and 117–111.

After the fight, Akui admitted that although he was declared the winner, it was not a flawless victory. He acknowledged that Thananchai had fought fiercely and countered effectively throughout all 12 rounds. He himself recognized the need to go back and further improve his skills in order to stay at the top.

On Thananchai's side, Surachart openly expressed his strong dissatisfaction with the judges' decision. Personally, he saw the outcome very differently and announced his intention to file an official appeal with the WBA, calling for a rematch to settle the score.

Boxing legend Khaosai Galaxy acknowledged that Thananchai had fought well, but as a challenger stepping into the champion's backyard, his performance simply wasn't enough to sway the judges. In Khaosais view, if Thananchai truly wanted to walk away with the title, he needed to clearly dominate the fight—leave no doubt in anyone's mind, and deliver a performance convincing enough to overcome the home-crowd advantage.

== After Akui fight ==
On July 31, 2026, he won a unanimous decision over 10 rounds against Phatthana Srisawad, a former youth national amateur boxer who had just made his professional debut. Surachart said that he wanted to encourage Thananchai to move down to the light-flyweight division and challenge for the title in that division against fellow Thai IBF champion Thanongsak Simsri, who is based in Japan.

== Professional boxing record ==
35 fights	33 wins	2 losses
By knockout	16	0
By decision	17	2

No.	Result	Record	Opponent	Type	Round, time	Date	Location	Notes
35	Win	33–2	Joperson Trazo	UD	10	30 Oct 2026	Nakornloung Stadium, Nonthaburi, Thailand	Retained WBC-ABCO flyweight title
34	Win	32–2	Kitidech Hirunsuk	UD	8	28 Aug 2026	Nonthaburi, Thailand	
33	Win	31–2	Phatthana Srisawad	UD	10	31 Jul 2026	Nakornloung Stadium, Nonthaburi, Thailand	
32	Win	30–2	Reymark Alicaba	UD	8	27 Mar 2026	Nakornloung Stadium, Nonthaburi, Thailand	
31	Win	29–2	Alec Xandrhe Del Rio	UD	10	28 Nov 2025	Suan Lum Night Bazaar Ratchadaphisek, Bangkok, Thailand	Retained WBC-ABCO flyweight title
30	Win	28–2	Arnold Garde	UD	10	26 Sep 2025	Suan Lum Night Bazaar Ratchadaphisek, Bangkok, Thailand	Won vacant WBC-ABCO flyweight title
29	Win	27–2	Ryuku Nagamine	UD	10	25 Jul 2025	Suan Lum Night Bazaar Ratchadaphisek, Bangkok, Thailand	Won vacant OPBF Silver flyweight title
28	Win	26–2	Suriya Puttaluksa	TKO	4 (6), 2:49	2 May 2025	Suan Lum Night Bazaar Ratchadaphisek, Bangkok, Thailand	
27	Loss	25–2	Seigo Yuri Akui	SD	12	13 Oct 2023	Ariake Arena, Tokyo, Japan	For WBA flyweight title
26	Win	25–1	Kento Hatanaka	MD	12	12 Aug 2024	International Conference Hall, Nagoya, Japan	Won WBO Asia Pacific flyweight title
25	Win	24–1	Nattapong Singkhanart	TKO	2 (6)	31 May 2024	Max Muaythai Stadium, Pattaya, Thailand	
24	Win	23–1	Cheng Liu	UD	10	26 Apr 2024	Max Muaythai Stadium, Pattaya, Thailand	Retained WBC-ABCO flyweight title
23	Win	22–1	Xolieng Souvannaphakdy	TKO	2 (6)	23 Mar 2024	Max Muaythai Stadium, Pattaya, Thailand	
22	Win	21–1	Wisitsak Waisaew	UD	6	25 Nov 2023	Suan Lum Night Bazaar Ratchadaphisek, Bangkok, Thailand	
21	Win	20–1	Thani Narinram	TKO	2 (6)	30 Sep 2023	Suan Lum Night Bazaar Ratchadaphisek, Bangkok, Thailand	
20	Win	19–1	Nirun Baonok	UD	6	26 Aug 2023	Suan Lum Night Bazaar Ratchadaphisek, Bangkok, Thailand	
19	Win	18–1	Eaktwan BTU Ruaviking	UD	8	24 Jun 2023	Suan Lum Night Bazaar Ratchadaphisek, Bangkok, Thailand	
18	Win	17–1	Jonathan Almacen	UD	8	27 May 2023	Thupatemi Stadium, Pathum Thani, Bangkok, Thailand	
17	Win	16–1	Roland Jay Biendima	UD	10	25 Mar 2023	Thupatemi Stadium, Pathum Thani, Thailand	Retained WBC-ABCO flyweight title
16	Win	15–1	Xolieng Souvannaphakdy	TKO	3 (6)	26 Nov 2022	Suan Lum Night Bazaar Ratchadaphisek, Bangkok, Thailand	
15	Win	14–1	Jeny Boy Boca	TKO	6 (10)	24 Sep 2022	Suan Lum Night Bazaar Ratchadaphisek, Bangkok, Thailand	Retained WBC-ABCO flyweight title
14	Win	13–1	Brandon Alejandro	TKO	2 (6), 0:52	27 Aug 2022	Suan Lum Night Bazaar Ratchadaphisek, Bangkok, Thailand	
13	Win	12–1	Kwanchai Pliankhunthod	UD	6	26 Mar 2022	Suan Lum Night Bazaar Ratchadaphisek, Bangkok, Thailand	
12	Win	11–1	Wicha Phulaikhao	KO	4 (10), 0:31	7 Nov 2020	Workpoint Studio, Pathum Thani, Thailand	Retained WBC-ABCO flyweight title
11	Win	10–1	Seksan Khumdee	TKO	6 (8)	5 Sep 2020	Workpoint Studio, Pathum Thani, Thailand	
10	Win	9–1	Kwanchai Pliankhuntod	KO	5 (6), 1:09	1 Aug 2020	Workpoint Studio, Pathum Thani, Thailand	
9	Win	8–1	Kompayak Porpramook	TKO	9 (10), 0:50	7 Mar 2020	Workpoint Studio, Pathum Thani, Thailand	Won vacant WBC-ABCO flyweight title
8	Win	7–1	Worawatchai Boonjan	UD	6	11 Jan 2020	Singmanassak Muaythai School, Pathum Thani, Thailand	
7	Win	6–1	Samartlek Kokietgym	UD	6	19 Oct 2019	Workpoint Studio, Pathum Thani, Thailand	
6	Win	5–1	Thodsawat Srisawat	TKO	3 (4), 2:20	20 Jul 2019	Workpoint Studio, Pathum Thani, Thailand	
5	Win	4–1	Danai Ngiabphukhiaw	TKo	2 (6)	23 Mar 2019	Workpoint Studio, Pathum Thani, Thailand	
4	Win	3–1	Keetapat Ninarun	TKO	6 (6), 0:22	22 Dec 2018	Workpoint Studio, Pathum Thani, Thailand	
3	Win	2–1	Thiraphat Somdee	KO	4 (6)	20 Oct 2018	Workpoint Studio, Pathum Thania, Thailand	
2	Loss	1–1	Phongsaphon Panyakum	UD	4	22 Sep 2018	Workpoint Studio, Pathum Thani, Thailand	
1	Win	1–0	Piphat Rattana	KO	1 (4)	21 Jul 2018	Workpoint Studio, Pathum Thani, Thailand	

== Exhibition boxing record ==
1 fight	0 wins	0 losses
Non-scored	1	

No.	Result	Record	Opponent	Type	Round, time	Date	Location	Notes
1	—N/a	0–0 (1)	Tanes Ongjunta	—N/a	12	24 Dec 2022	Thupatemi Thai Airforce Boxing Stadium, Rangsit, Thailand	Non-scored bout
