= Wulan Tuolehazi =

Chinese boxer (born 1993)

Personal information
- Nickname: Tianshan Snow Leopard
- Nationality: Chinese
- Born: 乌兰托了哈孜, Kazakh: Ұлан Төлеуғазы, romanized: Ulan Tölewğazı; 5 March 1993 (age 33) Xibert village, Emin County, Xinjiang, China
- Height: 163 cm (5 ft 4 in)
- Weight: Flyweight

Boxing career
- Reach: 164 cm (65 in)
- Stance: Orthodox

Boxing record
- Total fights: 24
- Wins: 15
- Win by KO: 7
- Losses: 7
- Draws: 2

Wulan Tuolehazi (Chinese: 乌兰托了哈孜; born 5 March 1993 Kazakh: Ұлан Төлеуғазы) is a Chinese professional boxer who challenged for the WBO flyweight title in 2019.

== Early life ==
Wulan born on 5 March 1993 into an ethnic Kazakh family of herdsmen in Xibert village, Emin County, Tacheng Prefecture, Xinjiang Uygur Autonomous Region in northwest China. At one point his parents owned 200 sheep and 20 cattle. He learned to ride a horse at the age of five, and began school at age seven. He began freestyle wrestling in 2007 while in primary school, but switched over to boxing the following year after he was spotted by Tang Bo, head boxing coach at the Ürümqi Sports School. Coming from a poor background, he hoped to make enough money by fighting in order to support his family.

He represented Ürümqi at the 2010 Xinjiang National Games, winning a gold medal. The following year he represented Xinjiang at the National Youth Championships, finishing as runner-up to national team member He Junjun. Even though he had switched sports, he also practiced Greco-Roman wrestling, winning a Xinjiang Youth Greco-Roman Championship. After graduating from the sports school, he temporarily gave up boxing to attend Xinjiang Normal University, where he opened a boxing club. During his third year of studies he accepted his first offer for a professional boxing match.

In his amateur career, he won the Xinjiang championship five times.

== Professional career ==
With little connections on the professional scene, Wulan began his career with inexperienced management and poor matchmaking. After fighting at light flyweight during his amateur career, Wulan made his professional debut on 28 November 2015 at super bantamweight, losing by unanimous decision (UD) after eight rounds against 19-year-old Jian Wang in Suzhou. Only a few weeks later he was defeated in his second bout against Van Thao Tran in South Korea. After two wins, he lost to Xian Qian Wei by way of UD on 21 October 2016, dropping to 2–3. He joined Team M23 and Quanwei Sihai Promotions in May 2017, dropping to a more natural flyweight class. On 5 May 2018 he knocked down former world champion Kwanthai Sithmorseng three times in four rounds, improving his record to 7–3–1. He defeated Watana Phenbaan by fourth-round technical knockout (TKO) in Qingdao on 27 July 2018 to win the interim WBO Asia Pacific flyweight title, his first regional belt. Two months later he handed undefeated Filipino youngster Jayr Raquinel his first career loss to take the vacant WBC Silver flyweight title, being favored unanimously by the judges in Changsha with scores of 117–111, 116–111 and 116–111. The bout was rated three out of five stars by AlltheBestFights.com as one of the top fights of the year, and Wulan entered the top 10 of the WBC rankings in February 2019.

On 30 March 2019 Wulan faced Japanese prospect Ryota Yamauchi in Shanghai for the vacant WBA International flyweight title. He dropped Yamauchi with a right uppercut in the third round en route to a UD victory (117–109, 117–109 and 115–112), although he was also knocked down in the fight. The bout was given three out of five stars by AlltheBestFights.com. He retained his belt two months later on 26 May against Ardin Diale, and again on 17 October with a fifth-round stoppage of Satoshi Tanaka for his eighth consecutive victory. On New Year's Eve 2019, he unsuccessfully challenged Kosei Tanaka in Tokyo for the WBO flyweight title. The world champion hit Wulan with a devastating three-piece combo of uppercuts late in the third round that kept him on the mat for about two minutes. Wulan rebounded from his unsuccessful title challenge with a sixth-round technical knockout victory over Jomar Fajardo in Bangkok on 8 March 2020.

== Professional boxing record ==
24 fights	15 wins	7 losses
By knockout	7	2
By decision	8	5
Draws	2	

No.	Result	Record	Opponent	Type	Round, time	Date	Location	Notes
24	Loss	15–7–2	Kyosuke Takami	UD	8	6 Jul 2024	Korakuen Hall, Tokyo, Japan	
23	Loss	15–6–2	Olimjon Nazarov	SD	10	13 Jan 2024	PARADISE CITY, Incheon, South Korea	For WBO Oriental flyweight title
22	Loss	15–5–2	Taku Kuwahara	KO	4 (12), 2:10	11 Jul 2023	Korakuen Hall, Tokyo, Japan	For OPBF flyweight title
21	Draw	15–4–2	Sho Kimura	MD	10	25 Jan 2023	Spaceplus Bangkok RCA, Bangkok, Thailand	For WBA International flyweight title
20	Win	15–4–1	Guangheng Luan	UD	6	24 Nov 2022	Wenshan, China	
19	Win	14–4–1	Jomar Fajardo	TKO	6 (8), 2:56	8 Mar 2020	Suan Lum Night Bazaar Ratchadaphisek, Bangkok, Thailand	
18	Loss	13–4–1	Kosei Tanaka	KO	3 (12), 2:29	31 Dec 2019	Ota City General Gymnasium, Tokyo, Japan	For WBO flyweight title
17	Win	13–3–1	Satoshi Tanaka	TKO	5 (12), 2:15	17 Oct 2019	Yangze River Delta Roadshow Center, Shanghai, China	Retained WBA International flyweight title
16	Win	12–3–1	Ardin Diale	MD	12	26 May 2019	Fuzhou, China	Retained WBA International flyweight title
15	Win	11–3–1	Ryota Yamauchi	UD	12	30 Mar 2019	PuTuo Stadium, Shanghai, China	Won vacant WBA International flyweight title
14	Win	10–3–1	Roland Jay Biendima	TKO	9 (10), 2:09	10 Jan 2019	Beijing, China	
13	Win	9–3–1	Jayr Raquinel	UD	12	28 Sep 2018	Changsha Social Work College Gymnasium, Changsha, China	Won vacant WBC Silver flyweight title
12	Win	8–3–1	Watana Phenbaan	TKO	4 (10), 0:45	27 Jul 2018	Qingdao Guosen Gymnasium, Qingdao, China	Won interim WBO Asia Pacific flyweight title
11	Win	7–3–1	Kwanthai Sithmorseng	TKO	4 (10), 0:26	5 May 2018	Guang'an Stadium, Guang'an, China	
10	Win	6–3–1	Takeshi Kaneko	KO	2 (6), 1:43	6 Apr 2018	Putuo Stadium, Shanghai, China	
9	Draw	5–3–1	Takeshi Kaneko	SD	6	20 Oct 2017	Korakuen Hall, Tokyo, Japan	
8	Win	5–3	Noldi Manakane	UD	10	7 May 2017	Shan Xi Normal University Stadium, Xi'an, China	
7	Win	4–3	Sheng Peng	TKO	9 (10), 0:25	22 Apr 2017	China Muslim International Business & Trade City, Yinchuan, China	
6	Win	3–3	Guo Chao	UD	10	14 Jan 2017	Da Mai Centre, Dalian, China	
5	Loss	2–3	Xian Qian Wei	UD	10	21 Oct 2016	Xi Xia Sheng Dian Theater, Zhenbei Pu, Yinchuan, China	
4	Win	2–2	Xin Ming Liu	SD	6	10 Sep 2016	Comprehensive Gym, Shanghai University of Sport, Shanghai, China	
3	Win	1–2	Zi Jie Shang	MD	6	25 May 2016	Diamond Court, Beijing, China	
2	Loss	0–2	Van Thao Tran	PTS	6	12 Dec 2015	Hotel Shilla Casin, Jeju, South Korea	
1	Loss	0–1	Jian Wang	UD	8	28 Nov 2015	Suzhou Sports Center, Suzhou, China	

== Personal life ==
Hailing from the Xinjiang Uygur Autonomous Region, he does not speak fluent Mandarin and currently lives in Emin County.
