= Tanes Ongjunta =

Thai boxer

Personal information
- Nationality: Thai
- Born: 18 July 1992 (age 34) Bangkok, Thailand
- Height: 5 ft 5 in (165 cm)
- Weight: Flyweight

Boxing career
- Stance: Orthodox

Boxing record
- Total fights: 16
- Wins: 14
- Win by KO: 8
- Losses: 2
Medal record
Men's amateur boxing
Representing Thailand
Southeast Asian Games
Silver medal – second place	2015 Singapore	Bantamweight
Silver medal – second place	2017 Kuala Lumpur	Flyweight

Tanes Ongjunta (Thai: ธเนศ องค์จันทร์ต๊ะ, born 18 July 1992), better known by his ring name Jomwo Kor.Saklamphun (Thai: จอมโว ก.ศักดิ์ลำพูน), Jomwo Kelasport (Thai: จอมโว กีล่าสปอร์ต), is a Thai professional boxer, who has held the WBA Asia flyweight title since 2021.

As an amateur, Ongjunta medaled twice at the Southeast Asian Games, winning a silver medal as a bantamweight in 2015 and a silver medal as a flyweight in 2017.

== Personal life ==
Ongjunta also trains people in treatment for substance abuse at Siam Rehab in Chiang Rai as well as holds regular free training sessions for underprivileged youth in his home gym in Mai Sai, Chiang Rai.

== Amateur boxing career ==
=== Southeast Asian Games ===
Ongjunta represented Thailand at the 2015 Southeast Asian Games, held in June 2015, once again competing in the bantamweight division. He beat Rafli Langi by unanimous decision in the opening round of the tournament, Arfiqanie Ahmad Anshori by unanimous decision in the quarterfinals and Muhamad Ridhwan by unanimous decision in the finals, which earned him a place in the tournament finals. Ongjunta faced Mario Fernandez in the finals, which were held on 10 June 2015. He lost the fight by a second-round technical knockout.

Ongjunta competed in the flyweight event of the 2017 Southeast Asian Games, held in August 2017 at the Malaysia International Trade and Exhibition Centre MITEC. He won the quarterfinal bout against Hang Hamorn and semifinal bout against Ian Clark Bautista by unanimous decision, but lost the final bout against Aldoms Suguro by split decision.

=== Invitational tournaments ===
Ongjunta participated in the 2015 Thailand International Invitational Boxing Tournament, as a replacement for Donchai Thathi. He moved up in weight to bantamweight (-56 kg) for this tournament. He won the gold medal after beating Lanhai Xiao by unanimous decision in the opening round on 4 April 2015, Almas Zhakypov by unanimous decision in the semifinals on 6 April 2015 and Javier Ibanez by unanimous decision in the finals on 7 April 2015.

Ongjunta moved back down to flyweight to compete in the 2016 Olympic qualifying event in Baku. Although he was able to win his first two fights, against Syed Muhammad Asif and Murtadha Al Sudani by unanimous decision, he eventually lost to Kharkhuu Enkhamar in the tournament quarterfinals. As such, he was unable to participate in the 2016 Olympic Games.

Ongjunta competed in the flyweight event of the 2016 FISU World University Boxing Championships, held in October 2016. He secured Thailand's fourth gold medal, after beating Subaru Murata, Chingiz Natyrov and Malik Nahim by unanimous decision.

Ongjunta took part in the flyweight event of the 2017 Thailand International Invitational Tournament. He won the opening round bout against Gandulam Mungunerdene by split decision, and beat Ian Clark Bautista by points in the quarterfinals and Jasurbek Latipov by split decision in the semifinals. Ongjunta secured the gold medal after beating Frank Zaldivar by a majority decision in the finals.

== Professional boxing career ==
Ongjunta made his professional debut against fellow debutante Watcharin Ontong on 12 October 2019. He won the fight by a first-round knockout. He amassed a 4–0 record during the next 20 days, with two victories coming by way of stoppage. Ongjunta was scheduled to fight Adrian Lerasan for the vacant WBA super-flyweight title on 1 March 2020, in his fifth professional bout. He lost the fight by an eight-round technical knockout.

After beating Pakphum Tawinram by a first-round technical knockout in a super-flyweight bout on 28 November 2020 and Khachonsak Pothong by a third-round technical knockout in a bantamweight bout on 19 December 2020, Ongjunta moved down to flyweight to face Suriyan Satorn for the vacant WBA Asia flyweight title on 27 March 2021. He won the fight by unanimous decision, with scores of 99–91, 100-90 and 100–90. Ongjunta made his first title defense against Lerdchai Chaiyawed on 27 November 2021. He won the fight by unanimous decision, with all three judges scoring the bout 100–90 in his favor.

Ongjunta made his second WBA Asia flyweight title defense against Jakrawut Majungoen on 7 May 2022. He won the fight by a sixth-round technical knockout. Ongjunta made his third WBA Asia title defense against Jeny Boy Boca on 6 August 2022. He retained the title by unanimous decision, with scores of 98–92, 96–94 and 99–91.

== Professional boxing record ==
16 fights	14 wins	2 losses
By knockout	8	2
By decision	6	0

No.	Result	Record	Opponent	Type	Round, time	Date	Location	Notes
16	Win	14–2	Saengthong Tor Buamas	TKO	4 (10), 0:42	1 Feb 2025	Suan Lum Night Bazaar Ratchadaphisek, Bangkok, Thailand	
15	Win	13–2	Komgrich Nantapech	TKO	6 (12), 3:00	3 Aug 2024	Spaceplus Bangkok RCA, Bangkok, Thailand	Won vacant WBA Asia flyweight title
14	Loss	12–2	Dave Apolinario	KO	4 (8), 1:44	22 Feb 2024	Korakuen Hall, Tokyo, Japan	
13	Win	12–1	Ayoub Elamghari	TKO	3 (6), 2:23	5 Nov 2022	Spaceplus Bangkok RCA, Bangkok, Thailand	
12	Win	11–1	Jeny Boy Boca	UD	10	6 Aug 2022	Spaceplus Bangkok RCA, Bangkok, Thailand	Retained WBA Asia flyweight title
11	Win	10–1	Kongfah CP Freshmart	TKO	6 (10)	7 May 2022	Suan Lum Night Bazaar Ratchadaphisek, Bangkok, Thailand	Retained WBA Asia flyweight title
10	Win	9–1	PetchSiam Petch Por.Tor.Or.	UD	10	27 Nov 2021	Suan Lum Night Bazaar Ratchadaphisek, Bangkok, Thailand	Retained WBA Asia flyweight title
9	Win	8–1	Kompayak T.C.MuayThai	UD	10	27 Mar 2021	Suan Lum Night Bazaar Ratchadaphisek, Bangkok, Thailand	Won vacant WBA Asia flyweight title
8	Win	7–1	Kaichon Sor Voraphin	TKO	3 (6)	19 Dec 2020	Suan Lum Night Bazaar Ratchadaphisek, Bangkok, Thailand	
7	Win	6–1	Pakphum Ror.Ror.Samkoak	TKO	1 (6)	28 Nov 2020	Suan Lum Night Bazaar Ratchadaphisek, Bangkok, Thailand	
6	Win	5–1	Decha Puttaluksa	UD	6	31 Oct 2020	Suan Lum Night Bazaar Ratchadaphisek, Bangkok, Thailand	
5	Loss	4–1	Adrian Lerasan	TKO	8 (12), 2:35	1 Mar 2020	Suan Lum Night Bazaar Ratchadaphisek, Bangkok, Thailand	For vacant WBA Asia super-flyweight title
4	Win	4–0	Jomhod Eminentair	UD	5	2 Nov 2019	Suan Lum Night Bazaar Ratchadaphisek, Bangkok, Thailand	Won The Fighter super-flyweight Tournament
3	Win	3–0	Gairung SasipraphaGym	TKO	1 (3)	26 Oct 2019	Suan Lum Night Bazaar Ratchadaphisek, Bangkok, Thailand	The Fighter super-flyweight Tournament semi-final
2	Win	2–0	Komkrit Rachanon	UD	3	19 Oct 2019	Suan Lum Night Bazaar Ratchadaphisek, Bangkok, Thailand	The Fighter super-flyweight Tournament quarter-final
1	Win	1–0	Mohok Tded99	KO	1 (3)	12 Oct 2019	Suan Lum Night Bazaar Ratchadaphisek, Bangkok, Thailand	The Fighter super-flyweight Tournament Round of 16

== Exhibition boxing record ==
1 fight	0 wins	0 losses
Non-scored	1	

No.	Result	Record	Opponent	Type	Round, time	Date	Location	Notes
1	—N/a	0–0 (1)	Thananchai Charunphak	—N/a	12	24 Dec 2022	Thupatemi Thai Airforce Boxing Stadium, Rangsit, Thailand	Non-scored bout
