= List of sports governing bodies in Japan =

A list of official sports governing bodies, federations and associations for Sport in Japan.

| Body | Official site |
|---|---|
| All Japan Iaido Federation | http://iai.do/zen/ |
| All Japan Archery Federation | http://www.archery.or.jp/ |
| All Japan Judo Federation | http://www.judo.or.jp/ |
| All Japan Kendo Federation | http://www.kendo.or.jp/ |
| All Japan Naginata Federation | https://web.archive.org/web/20080929070249/http://www.konishi.co.jp/naginata/ |
| All Nippon Kyudo Federation | http://www.kyudo.jp/ |
| East Japan Boxing Association | http://jpbox.jp/ |
| Federation Japonaise d'Escrime | https://web.archive.org/web/20081219044720/http://www.sportsweb.ne.jp/fje.htm |
| Japan Amateur Athletic Federation | https://web.archive.org/web/20080327105947/http://www.rikuren.or.jp/ |
| Japan Bandy Federation | https://web.archive.org/web/20150114164752/http://bandy.or.jp/ |
| Japan Amateur Baseball Association | http://www.jaba.or.jp/ |
| Japan Amateur Boxing Federation | http://www.japan-sports.or.jp/boxing/ |
| Japan Amateur Sports Association | http://www.japan-sports.or.jp/ |
| Japan Association of Athletics Federations | https://web.archive.org/web/20081218071425/http://www.rikuren.or.jp/fan/ |
| Japan Automobile Federation | http://www.jaf.or.jp/ |
| Japan Basketball Association | https://web.archive.org/web/20110622053247/http://jabba-net.com/ |
| Japan Bobsleigh and Luge Federation | https://web.archive.org/web/20131219010522/http://www.soli.jp/ |
| Japan Bodybuilding Federation | http://www.jbbf.jp/ |
| Japan Bowling Congress | https://web.archive.org/web/20071223070326/http://www006.upp.so-net.ne.jp/jbc/ |
| Japan Boxing Commission | http://www.jbc.or.jp/ |
| Japan Canoe Federation | http://www.canoe.or.jp/ |
| Japan Clay Target Shooting Association | https://web.archive.org/web/20090820094827/http://www.jctsa.or.jp/ |
| Japan Curling Association | http://www.curling.or.jp/ |
| Japan Cycling Federation | http://www.jcf.or.jp/ |
| Japan Equestrian Federation | http://www.equitation-japan.com/ |
| Japan Football Association | http://www.jfa.or.jp/ |
| Japan Golf Association | http://www.jga.or.jp/ |
| Japan Gymnastic Association | http://www.jpn-gym.or.jp/ |
| Japan Handball Association | http://www.handball.jp/ |
| Japan Hockey Association | http://www.hockey.or.jp/ |
| Japan Ice Hockey Federation | http://www.jihf.or.jp/ |
| Japan Kabaddi Association | http://homepage2.nifty.com/kabaddi-nippon/%5B%5D |
| Japan Karate Federation | http://www.karatedo.co.jp/jkf/ |
| Japan Model Racing Car Association | http://www.jmrca.jp |
| Japan Mountaineering Association | http://www.jma-sangaku.or.jp/ |
| Japan Professional Bowling Association | http://www.jpba.or.jp/ |
| Japan Rowing Association | http://www.jara.or.jp/ |
| Japan Rubber Baseball Association | http://www.jsbb.or.jp/ |
| Japan Rugby Football Union | https://web.archive.org/web/20140216142855/http://www.rugby-japan.or.jp/ |
| Japan Sailing Federation | http://www.jsaf.or.jp/ |
| Japan Sepaktakraw Federation | http://www.jstaf.jp/ |
| Japan Skating Federation | http://www.skatingjapan.or.jp/ |
| Japan Soft Tennis Association | http://www.soft-tennis.com/ |
| Japan Softball Association | http://www.softball.or.jp/ |
| Japan Sports Arts Association | http://www.japan-sports.or.jp/sportsarts/ |
| Japan Squash Association | https://web.archive.org/web/20131219052330/http://www.squash-japan.com/ |
| Japan Sumo Federation | http://www.nihonsumo-renmei.jp/ |
| Japan Swimming Federation | http://www.swim.or.jp/ |
| Japan Table Tennis Association | http://jtta.or.jp/ |
| Japan Taekwondo Federation | http://www.jtkd.com/ |
| Japan Tennis Association | http://www.tennis.or.jp/ |
| Japan Triathlon Union | http://www.jtu.or.jp/ |
| Japan Volleyball Association | http://www.jva.or.jp/ |
| Japan Weightlifting Association | http://www.japan-sports.or.jp/weightlifting/index.htm |
| Japan Wrestling Federation | http://www.japan-wrestling.jp/ |
| Japan Wushu Taijiquan Federation | https://web.archive.org/web/20071215180838/http://www.jwtf.or.jp/ |
| Japanese Olympic Committee | http://www.joc.or.jp/ |
| Modern Pentathlon & Biathlon Union of Japan | http://www.japan-sports.or.jp/mpbuj/ |
| National Rifle Association of Japan | http://www.riflesports.jp/ |
| Nihon Sumo Kyokai | http://www.sumo.or.jp/ |
| Nippon Badminton Association | https://web.archive.org/web/20081102162251/http://www.u-netsurf.ne.jp/nichiba/ |
| Nippon Billiards Association | http://www.nba.or.jp/ |
| The Japan Amateur Jukendo Federation | https://web.archive.org/web/20060822081904/http://www.jukendo.or.jp/ |
| Ski Association of Japan | http://www.ski-japan.or.jp/ |
| West Japan Boxing Association | http://j-boxwest.com/ |
