= Superfly (boxing) =

Boxing competitions

Superfly was a series of professional boxing cards centered around the super flyweight division.

== History ==
The concept was created by promoter Tom Loeffler and has been broadcast on HBO Boxing After Dark. The events were originally meant to showcase Román González, regarded as the best active boxer, pound for pound, at the time. But the two events to date have been headlined by Srisaket Sor Rungvisai, following his knockout win over the former at the first installment of the series.

Historically, American audiences have rarely been interested in fighters at lower weight classes. However, the Superfly events are built to showcase several of the best fighters at super flyweight and adjacent divisions.

== Events ==
=== Superfly ===
The first event was held on September 9, 2017, at the StubHub Center in Carson, California.

| Weight class | Boxer 1 | vs. | Boxer 2 | Type | Round | Time | Notes |
|---|---|---|---|---|---|---|---|
| Super flyweight | (Thailand) Srisaket Sor Rungvisai (c) | def. | (Nicaragua) Román González | KO | 4 (12) | 1:18 |
| Super flyweight | (Japan) Naoya Inoue (c) | def. | (United States) Antonio Nieves | RTD | 6 (12) | 3:00 |
| Super flyweight | (Mexico) Juan Francisco Estrada | def. | (Mexico) Carlos Cuadras | UD | 12 |

=== Superfly 2 ===
The second event was held on 24 February 2018 at The Forum in Inglewood, California.

| Weight class | Boxer 1 | vs. | Boxer 2 | Type | Round | Time | Notes |
|---|---|---|---|---|---|---|---|
| Super flyweight | (Thailand) Srisaket Sor Rungvisai (c) | def. | (Mexico) Juan Francisco Estrada | MD | 12 |
| Super flyweight | (Puerto Rico) McWilliams Arroyo | def. | (Mexico) Carlos Cuadras | MD | 10 |
| Flyweight | (Philippines) Donnie Nietes (c) | def. | (Argentina) Juan Carlos Reveco | KO | 7 (12) | 0:53 |
| Flyweight | (Ukraine) Artem Dalakian | def. | (United States) Brian Viloria | UD | 12 |

=== Superfly 3 ===
The third event was held on 8 September 2018 at The Forum in Inglewood, California.

| Weight class | Boxer 1 | vs. | Boxer 2 | Type | Round | Time | Notes |
|---|---|---|---|---|---|---|---|
| Super flyweight | (Mexico) Juan Francisco Estrada | def. | (Mexico) Felipe Orucuta | UD | 12 |
| Super flyweight | (Philippines) Donnie Nietes | vs. | (Philippines) Aston Palicte | Split Draw | 12 |
| Super flyweight | (Japan) Kazuto Ioka | def. | (Puerto Rico) McWilliams Arroyo | UD | 10 |
