= Amnat Ruenroeng =

Thai former professional Muay Thai fighter, kickboxer, and boxer

- Born: December 18, 1979 (age 46); Si Racha, Chonburi, Thailand
- Native name: อำนาจ รื่นเริง
- Other names: Amnat Kasetphatthana (อำนาจ เกษตรพัฒนา); Petch Por.Burapha (เพชร ป.บูรพา)
- Nickname: The Flammable Kid (ไอ้หนุ่มไวไฟ)
- Height: 164 cm (5 ft 5 in)
- Division: Flyweight; Super Flyweight; Featherweight; Super Featherweight
- Reach: 177 cm (70 in)
- Style: Muay Thai (Muay Femur); Boxing
- Stance: Orthodox

Professional boxing record
- Total: 30
- Wins: 23
- By knockout: 8
- Losses: 7

Amnat Ruenroeng (Thai: อำนาจ รื่นเริง; born December 18, 1979) is a Thai former professional Muay Thai fighter, kickboxer, and professional boxer. He is a former Lumpinee Stadium Super Flyweight champion in Muay Thai as well as a former IBF Flyweight world champion in boxing. He represented Thailand in the 2008 Summer Olympics and 2016 Summer Olympics.

== Early life ==
Ruenroeng was born without ever knowing who his parents were. At birth, he didn't even receive a birth certificate, as the officer refused to register him, uncertain whether he was a Thai national. He was raised in poverty by his grandmother and began fighting at the age of seven, starting in Muay Thai under the names "Petch Por.Burapha" (เพชร ป.บูรพา) and "Petch Tor.Bangsaen" (เพชร ต.บางแสน), eventually winning the Lumpinee Stadium Flyweight championship.

== Amateur career ==
Ruenroeng began boxing while serving a fifteen-year prison sentence for snatching a gold necklace, a crime he would later regret. Eventually, he turned himself in to the police, taking responsibility for his actions. In 2007, he won a Thai national title in the Light Flyweight division, and was released from prison for good behaviour the following day having served one year. He won a bronze medal as a junior flyweight at the 2007 World Amateur Boxing Championships in Chicago. He had lost in the semi-final to Philippines southpaw Harry Tanamor.

Ruenroeng took the gold medal at the King's Cup in Bangkok in 2008 after defeating Kazuto Ioka in the semifinal. He subsequently qualified to represent Thailand at the 2008 Summer Olympics in Beijing.

== Professional career ==
Ruenroeng made his professional debut in 2012. On 22 January 2014, he won the vacant IBF Flyweight title by defeating Rocky Fuentes. In his first defense, he traveled to Japan and earned a split decision over undefeated two-division champion Kazuto Ioka, who was making his flyweight debut. In his following fight, he defeated Puerto Rican challenger McWilliams Arroyo by split decision. On March 7, 2015, he earned a unanimous decision over undefeated two-time Olympic gold medalist Zou Shiming.

Ruenrong vs. Casimero

IBF flyweight titleholder Amnat Ruenroeng retained his belt with a 12-round decision win over Filipino boxer Johnriel Casimero at the Hua Mark Indoor Stadium in Bangkok, Thailand, on Saturday, June 27. Ruenroeng (16-0, 5 knockouts) was credited with two knockdowns against Casimero (21-3, 13 KOs), beginning with a counter right in Round 2 that caught the 25-year-old from Ormoc City lunging in. A second knockdown was called in Round 7 when Casimero was pushed into the ropes by Ruenroeng following a glancing right hand. Casimero appeared to knock Ruenroeng down in Round 3 when a counter left hook caused his glove to touch the canvas, but referee Larry Doggett ruled it a slip. The fight was marred by excessive clinching and over a dozen throwdowns by Ruenroeng. Doggett issued five warnings before finally taking a point from Ruenroeng in Round 11. “Amnat made the strategy how to win easy. It was not a dirty fight,” said Ruenroeng's trainer, Aljoe Jaro, who claims Casimero had hit Ruenroeng in the leg during the fight. “About the throwing down, that’s not an issue. Casimero was also playing dirty. Amnat was doing his job as a boxer how to win.”

The roughhouse tactics detracted from an otherwise crafty, resourceful performance from the Thai incumbent champion, whose jab disrupted the rhythm of Casimero, who held the IBF junior flyweight title for two years before being stripped last year for failing to make weight for his fight with Mauricio Fuentes. Casimero was the aggressor for the final 3 rounds, desperately trying to score a knockout to erase the deficit he found himself in.

Ruenroeng, 35, has now defended his belt four times successfully since winning it in January 2014 with a victory over Filipino contender Rocky Fuentes.

Ruenroeng vs. Casimero II

On May 25, 2016, in Diamond Court of the National Tennis Center, Beijing China, Ruenroeng fought Casimero again in a rematch for the IBF flyweight title and loss via knockout with a vicious body shot in the 4th round, ending Ruenroeng's undefeated streak.

A press-release by the IBF China stated that the bout was watched by over 200 million viewers and drew a 4.7 rating on CCTV-5. However, Sina Sports reported that according to the viewership data provided by CCTV, the bout actually drew a 0.87 rating and was watched by over 160 million viewers.

=== Post-world champion ===
After losing the world championship, he did not retire. Instead, he continued to fight, returning to his roots as an amateur. Going up to the Lightweight division, he participated in the 2016 Summer Olympics in Rio de Janeiro. He won his opening bout before losing in the round of 16 against Sofiane Oumiha, a younger fighter representing France. Oumiha eventually earned the silver medal, and went on to win gold at the world championships in 2017.

After the Olympics, Amnat returned to Muay Thai, which amassed as 1–2, including lost to Tenshin Nasukawa and Lin Qiangbang. On April 21, 2018, he competed again as a professional. He was knocked out in 5th round by a younger fighter, his fellow-countryman Nawaphon Kaikanha.

=== Amnat vs. Srisaket ===
On 1 August 2020, Amnat fought former world champion Srisaket Sor Rungvisai. Ruenroeng was game, and fought a close fight, but in the end didn't do enough to earn the win. Rungvisai won an all three judges scorecards, 99–91, 97–94 and 96–93.

== Personal life ==
=== Physical altercation ===
On 5 October 2025, a video went viral showing him arguing with a young man in front of a convenience store. The confrontation soon turned physical, with Amnat being knocked to the ground and repeatedly struck. After the situation was brought under control, reports revealed that he had been intoxicated and was about to cause a disturbance inside the store. The young man involved claimed he acted in self-defense to protect people inside.

Following the incident, Amnat was taken to hospital where, upon regaining consciousness, he admitted that his behaviour had been caused by heavy drinking. He explained that his alcohol use was driven by stress after retiring from boxing. He had lost his job, sold most of his belongings, and gone through a divorce. Close friends and his son told reporters that he was a kind and gentle man when sober, but became a different person under the influence of alcohol. Petchyindee promoter Nuttadaj Vachirarattanawong said he had previously arranged for the former athlete to attend rehabilitation, where he showed signs of recovery. However, after losing his family and livelihood, Nuttadaj called on government agencies to step in and offer support.

The Sports Authority of Thailand (SAT) has since acknowledged the case and confirmed that assistance is now being arranged. After that, he continued drinking and repeatedly got into trouble. Eventually, in the middle of 2026, he decided to quit alcohol once and for all. He rode his motorcycle for more than 300 km (186.4 mi) to Ubon Ratchathani to meet Yutthaphon Srisompong, better known as "Jonny Mueprab" (Jonny the Handcuff), a well-known social media personality, in order to start a new chapter in his life. He also received financial assistance from Rodtang Jitmuangnon, the famous Muay Thai and MMA fighter, who helped support him on his journey.

== Titles and accomplishments ==
=== Muay Thai ===
- Lumpinee Stadium
  - 2000 Lumpinee Stadium Flyweight (112 lbs) Champion

== Professional boxing record ==
28 fights	21 wins	7 losses
By knockout	6	2
By decision	15	5

No.	Result	Record	Opponent	Type	Round, time	Date	Location	Notes
28	Loss	21–7	Petchsatra CP Freshmart	MD	10	28 Jun 2022	International Stadium, Rangsit, Thailand	For ABF super-lightweight title
27	Loss	21–6	Wanchana Menayothin	UD	10	23 Nov 2021	International Stadium, Rangsit, Thailand	For WBC–ABCO Continental super-featherweight title
26	Loss	21–5	Arnon Yupang	UD	10	27 Feb 2021	Suan Lum Night Bazaar Ratchadaphisek, Bangkok, Thailand	For WBA Asia South featherweight title
25	Win	21–4	Pungluang Sor Singyu	UD	8	7 Nov 2020	Workpoint Studio, Bang Phun, Thailand	
24	Loss	20–4	Srisaket Sor Rungvisai	UD	10	1 Aug 2020	Workpoint Studio, Bang Phun, Thailand	
23	Win	20–3	Brian Lobetania	UD	6	23 Mar 2019	Workpoint Studio, Bang Phun, Thailand	
22	Win	19–3	Petchbarngborn Kokietgym	UD	6	8 Feb 2019	Yingcharoen Market, Bangkok, Thailand	
21	Loss	18–3	Nawaphon Kaikanha	TKO	5 (12)	21 Apr 2018	Workpoint Studio, Bang Phun, Thailand	For WBC–ABCO Continental super-flyweight title
20	Loss	18–2	Wenfeng Ge	UD	12	21 Nov 2017	Sports Center, Suzhou, China	For vacant WBO Oriental super-flyweight title
19	Win	18–1	Petchthongchai Singmanassak	TKO	3 (8)	26 Aug 2017	Khao Bang Krak Gym, Uthai Thani, Thailand	
18	Loss	17–1	John Riel Casimero	KO	4 (12), 2:10	25 May 2016	Diamond Court, Beijing, China	Lost IBF flyweight title
17	Win	17–0	Myung Ho Lee	UD	12	7 Dec 2015	Centential Club, Hua Hin, Thailand	Retained IBF flyweight title
16	Win	16–0	John Riel Casimero	UD	12	27 Jun 2015	Indoor Stadium Huamark, Bangkok, Thailand	Retained IBF flyweight title
15	Win	15–0	Zou Shiming	UD	12	8 Mar 2015	The Venetian Macao, Macau, SAR	Retained IBF flyweight title
14	Win	14–0	McWilliams Arroyo	SD	12	10 Sep 2014	Liptapanlop Hall, Nakhon Ratchasima, Thailand	Retained IBF flyweight title
13	Win	13–0	Kazuto Ioka	SD	12	7 May 2014	Bodymaker Colosseum, Osaka, Japan	Retained IBF flyweight title
12	Win	12–0	Rocky Fuentes	UD	12	22 Jan 2014	Liptapanlop Hall, Nakhon Ratchasima, Thailand	Won vacant IBF flyweight title
11	Win	11–0	Takuro Habu	TKO	4 (12), 1:37	16 Aug 2013	Viphavade, Surat Thani, Thailand	Retained IBF Asia flyweight title
10	Win	10–0	Ricky Manufoe	TKO	4 (12)	21 Jun 2013	Bangkok University, Bangkok, Thailand	Retained IBF Asia flyweight title
9	Win	9–0	Julius Alcos	UD	12	19 Apr 2013	Trairatanakon Temple School, Chaiya, Thailand	Won vacant IBF Pan Pacific flyweight title
8	Win	8–0	Michael Rodriguez	UD	12	15 Feb 2013	Wat Promthamnimit, Chom Bueng, Thailand	Won vacant IBF Asia flyweight title
7	Win	7–0	Geboi Mansalayao	TKO	7 (10)	26 Dec 2012	Rajapark Institute, Bangkok, Thailand	
6	Win	6–0	Danilo Pena	UD	6	16 Nov 2012	Pang Mu School, Maehongson, Thailand	
5	Win	5–0	Wilber Andogan	TD	6 (10)	19 Oct 2012	Ladprao, Bangkok, Thailand	
4	Win	4–0	Safwan Lombok	TKO	5 (8)	17 Aug 2012	City Sports Centre, Trat, Thailand	
3	Win	3–0	Lowie Bantigue	PTS	6	20 Jul 2012	Baan Khao Hom School, Chantaburi, Thailand	
2	Win	2–0	Jemmy Gobel	PTS	6	27 Jun 2012	Taweethapisek School, Bangkok, Thailand	
1	Win	1–0	Rino Ukru	TKO	4 (6), 0:30	18 May 2012	City Hall Ground, Nakhon Ratchasima, Thailand	

== Muay Thai & Kickboxing record ==
Muay Thai and Kickboxing record
66 Wins, 34 Losses, 15 Draws
Date	Result	Opponent	Event	Location	Method	Round	Time
2018-06-01	Loss	(China) Lin Qiangbang	Kunlun Fight Macao	Macau, China	Decision (Unanimous)	3	3:00
2017-02-12	Loss	(Japan) Tenshin Nasukawa	Knock Out Vol. 1	Tokyo, Japan	KO (left hook to the body)	4	2:39
2016-12-24	Win	(Russia) Albert Amirdzhanyan	Thai Fight 2016	Bangkok, Thailand	Decision	5	3:00
2004-12-07	Loss	(Thailand) Sam-A Gaiyanghadao	Lumpinee Stadium	Bangkok, Thailand	Decision	5	3:00
For the vacant Lumpinee Stadium Super Flyweight (115 lbs) title.
2004-10-09	Win	(Thailand) Sam-A Gaiyanghadao	Lumpinee Stadium	Bangkok, Thailand	Decision	5	3:00
2004-09-14	Win	(Thailand) Pettawee Sor Kittichai	Lumpinee Stadium	Bangkok, Thailand	Decision	5	3:00
2004-05-28	Loss	(Thailand) Sam-A Gaiyanghadao	Lumpinee Stadium	Bangkok, Thailand	Decision	5	3:00
2004-04-21	Win	(Thailand) Rungruanglek Lukprabat	Lumpinee Stadium	Bangkok, Thailand	Decision	5	3:00
2004-03-30	Loss	(Thailand) Sam-A Gaiyanghadao	Lumpinee Stadium	Bangkok, Thailand	Decision	5	3:00
2002-03-26	Draw	(Thailand) Kangwanlek Petchyindee	Lumpinee Stadium	Bangkok, Thailand	Decision	5	3:00
2000-08-05	Draw	(Thailand) Rungrit Sitchamlong	Lumpinee Stadium	Bangkok, Thailand	Decision	5	3:00
2000-07-18	Loss	(Thailand) Phet-Ek Sitjaopho	Lumpinee Stadium	Bangkok, Thailand	Decision	5	3:00
Loses the Lumpinee Stadium Flyweight (112 lbs) title.
2000-	Win	(Thailand)	Ngathao Attharungroj Lumpinee Stadium	Bangkok, Thailand	Decision	5	3:00
Wins the vacant Lumpinee Stadium Flyweight (112 lbs) title.
2000-02-11	Loss	(Thailand) Wanpichai Sor.Khamsing	Lumpinee Stadium	Bangkok, Thailand	Decision	5	3:00
2000-01-25	Loss	(Thailand) Thongchai Tor.Silachai	Lumpinee Stadium	Bangkok, Thailand	Decision	5	3:00
1999-11-26	Win	(Thailand) Kongprai Phayaklemon	Lumpinee Stadium	Bangkok, Thailand	Decision	5	3:00
1999-09-03	Win	(Thailand) Dansiam Kiatrungroj	Lumpinee Stadium	Bangkok, Thailand	KO	3	
1999-07-17	Win	(Thailand) Kongprai Phayaklemon	Lumpinee Stadium	Bangkok, Thailand	Decision	5	3:00
1999-05-02	Win	(Thailand) Ekachai Chaibadan		Bangkok, Thailand	Decision	5	3:00
Legend: Win Loss Draw/No contest Notes

== Viewership ==
Date	Fight	Country	Network	Viewership (est.)	Source(s)
May 25, 2015	John Riel Casimero vs. Amnat Ruenroeng	China	CCTV-5	160,000,000–200,000,000	
	Total viewership			160,000,000–200,000,000	

Sporting positions
Regional boxing titles
New title	IBF Asia flyweight champion 15 Feb 2013 – 22 Jan 2014; Won world title	Vacant Title next held by Kuk Chol Jon
Vacant Title last held by Ryan Rey Ponteras	IBF Pan Pacific flyweight champion 19 Apr 2013 – Jul 2013; Vacated	Vacant Title next held by Eaktwan BTU Ruaviking
World boxing titles
Vacant Title last held by Moruti Mthalane	IBF flyweight champion 22 Jan 2014 – 25 May 2016	Succeeded by John Riel Casimero
