= Srisaket Sor Rungvisai =

Thai boxer (born 1986)

Srisaket Sor Rungvisai ศรีสะเกษ ศ.รุ่งวิสัย
Personal information
- Born: Wisaksil Wangek (วิศักดิ์ศิลป์ วังเอก); 8 December 1986 (age 39) Uthumphon Phisai, Sisaket, Thailand
- Height: 5 ft 3 in (160 cm)
- Weight: Super-flyweight; Bantamweight

Boxing career
- Reach: 63 in (160 cm)
- Stance: Southpaw

Boxing record
- Total fights: 66
- Wins: 58
- Win by KO: 47
- Losses: 7
- Draws: 1

Wisaksil Wangek (Thai: วิศักดิ์ศิลป์ วังเอก; born 8 December 1986), better known by his ring name Srisaket Sor Rungvisai (ศรีสะเกษ ศ.รุ่งวิสัย), is a Thai professional boxer. He has held multiple super-flyweight world championships, including the WBC title twice between 2013 and 2019, and The Ring magazine and lineal titles from 2018 to 2019.

== Early life ==
Sor Rungvisai came from a very poor family in Sisaket Province in Thailand. He moved to Bangkok to escape from poverty when he was 13 years old. When he arrived in Bangkok, he had to walk more than 60 miles to apply for a job as a refuse collector at a department store. Life was so difficult for him that he sometimes ate leftovers he collected from the refuse.

== Professional career ==
He signed with Nakornloung Promotion, Thailand as a professional boxer in 2009. Two years later, Sor Rungvisai won the WBC-ABC super-flyweight title and went on to defend it 4 times between June 2011 and December 2012. In January 2019, he signed a multi-fight deal with Eddie Hearn of Matchroom Boxing. They plan to have his fights scheduled in the US and appear on the streaming service DAZN. His previous promoter was Thainchai Pisitwuttinan of Nakornloung Promotion.

=== WBC super flyweight champion ===
In an intense fight, Sor Rungvisai became the new WBC super-flyweight champion by knocking out Yota Sato in May 2013 in his native Sisaket. From the beginning of the fight, Sor Rungvisai harassed Sato, who tried to use his jab to keep Sor Rungvisai at bay, but the latter never relented on his pressure. The end came in round eight. Sor Rungvisai unleashed a flurry of punches on the defending champion until Italian referee Guido Cavalleri halted the fight after 1:23, giving Sor Rungvisai a technical knockout (TKO) victory. "What a fight! It was a war between two honorable fighters. Sato did not want to lose. Each round was toe-to-toe action until Sor Rungvisai overpowered Sato in the eighth" commented promoter Pisitwuttinan Thainchai.

Sor Rungvisai's first defense came against Hirofumi Mukai in Nakhon Ratchasima, Thailand. Mukai was overpowered from the early stages and his corner threw in the towel in the ninth round of the bout. Mukai was previously knocked down once in round two. "It was a total defeat", said the 27-year-old Mukai, who dropped to a record of 9–3–1. "I can’t remember how I fought at all."

Sor Rungvisai's first reign came to an end against Carlos Cuadras in May 2014. Referee Jay Nady stopped the fight after Cuadras was cut over his left eye due to an accidental clash of heads in round eight. According to WBC rules, Sor Rungvisai was deducted a point on all three scorecards. Cuadras won a unanimous technical decision (TD) (78–73, 77–74, 77–75) to dethrone Sor Rungvisai.

=== Sor Rungvisai vs. Salgado ===
Following his defeat against Cuadras, Sor Rungvisai reclaimed the WBC-ABC title and made one successful defense of it before earning a shot at the WBC Silver title.

Sor Rungvisai scored a fourth-round knockout (KO) of prospect José Salgado Fernández in May 2015. A series of left hands left Salgado defenseless, with a final right hook from Sor Rungvisai producing the knockdown and prompting the referee to immediately halt the contest. The fight between Sor Rungvisai and Salgado aired live on Channel 7 in Thailand, and also streamed live on the network's website. With the victory, Sor Rungvisai claimed the WBC Silver title and became the mandatory challenger to the WBC super-flyweight champion, Carlos Cuadras. Sor Rungvisai's handlers sought to host the rematch against Cuadras in Thailand. Negotiations between Cuadras and Sor Rungvisai stalled, with Cuadras going on to lose his title against Román González in September 2016. Sor Rungvisai kept busy fighting in Thailand, scoring eight knockouts in 18 months following his win over Salgado.

=== Sor Rungvisai vs. González ===
The WBC ordered González to make his first defense against Sor Rungvisai. The fight was scheduled for the undercard of Gennady Golovkin vs. Daniel Jacobs in March 2017. On fight night, Sor Rungvisai put González down with a body shot in the first round. González came back and won several rounds, despite two cuts over his eyes. Sor Runvisai lost a point due to repeated head butting. According to CompuBox, González outlanded Sor Rungvisai 441 (of 1,014) to 284 (of 940) overall. González also had an edge in power punches, 372 to 277. Sor Rungvisai ended up winning a majority decision (MD) (113–113, 114–112, 114–112). After the fight, González stated "I thought I won the fight. I want an immediate rematch. I want to get my title back." González earned a career high purse $500,000 whilst Rungvisai earned $75,000.

Following his upset win over González, Sor Rungvisai was appointed a police officer in Sisaket Province, and enrolled in the Faculty of Political Science, Chalermkarnchana University.

=== Sor Rungvisai vs. González II ===
On 4 April 2017 the WBC ordered a direct rematch to take place between González and Sor Rungvisai. Sor Rungvisai was due to fight mandatory challenger Carlos Cuadras. However, due to the direct rematch clause on the contract for the original fight, the WBC ordered Cuadras to fight the next available contender, former unified flyweight champion Juan Francisco Estrada for the WBC interim title. The winners of both fights would then fight each other. On 6 June promoter Tom Loeffler said the rematch would take place on 9 September on HBO at a location in California, US. WBO super-flyweight champion Naoya Inoue was in line to make his US TV debut on the same card and was going to face González next, if he were to be victorious against Rungvisai. Mexican promoter Osvaldo Küchle revealed that Cuadras and Estrada would fight on the undercard for the WBC interim title. On 6 July, Loeffler announced the event would take place at the StubHub Center in Carson, California. The fight was also to be shown live on Sky Sports in the UK.

At the seven-day weigh in on 3 September, González weighed 119.8 lbs and Rungvisai weighed in at 119 lbs. As per WBC rules, both boxers were required to weigh no more than 121 lbs. At the official weigh-in one day before the fight, González tipped the scales at 114.8 lbs, while Sor Rungvisai weighed 115 lbs. González would be paid a career high $600,000 purse, while Sor Rungvisai made $170,000.

On fight night, in front of a pro-González sell-out crowd of 7,418, González suffered his second consecutive defeat and failed to regain the WBC title, after being knocked out by Sor Rungvisai in the fourth round of their rematch. The opening round started with both fighters throwing heavy shots. Sor Rungvisai began to work the body straight away. In round four, González was knocked down hard from a left to the head. González beat the referee's count of ten, but on unsteady legs. Rungvisai then finished the badly hurt González with a right to the head that put him down flat on his back. Referee Tom Taylor didn't bother with a count, waiving the fight off at 1:18 of the round. González was taken to the hospital after the fight for precaution. Like the first fight, an accidental clash of heads occurred in round one. When González complained and the crowd booed, the referee warned Rungvisai.

After the fight, Sor Rungvisai stated that he had prepared for four months in order to knock González out, "I trained very hard for four months. I fought for Thailand, and this is what I dedicate this fight to, Thailand. For the first fight I only trained for two months. I knew I was going to knock him out." González was humble in defeat, "We were both trading punches, but his were harder, and they landed harder. I was very hurt the second time when I was knocked down, but I think I'll be OK." Loeffler also spoke to HBO about González' future, "I don't think he's done. When you fight a guy like Srisaket, he took the opportunity of winning the lottery. He beat the No. 1 pound-for-pound fighter and beat him in New York, and then he beat him more convincingly the second time. Now he has to be considered one of the best in the world. You saw Roman really packed the house, and Srisaket came into a hostile environment and proved he is a true champion. He has tremendous punching power." CompuBox stats showed that Rungvisai landed 80 of his 291 punches thrown (27%) and González landed 58 of 212 (27%). All 80 of Rungvisai's landed punches were power shots. After the fight, Sor Rungvisai and WBO champion Naoya Inoue both said they'd be willing to fight in a Unification bout, but WBC ordered Rungvisai to fight his mandatory challenger Juan Francisco Estrada instead. So the fight against Inoue didn't happen.

=== Sor Rungvisai vs. Estrada I ===
Sor Rungvisai faced Juan Francisco Estrada on 24 February 2018. For Sor Rungvisai, the bout served as his second defense in his second reign. He entered the bout on a 17-fight winning streak, featuring 15 stoppages. Estrada, a former unified flyweight champion, fought in his first super-flyweight world title fight.

Sor Rungvisai outpointed the Mexican challenger over twelve rounds via Majority Decision (114-114, 115-113, 117-111) to retain his title.

=== Sor Rungvisai vs Bae ===
Rungvisai's next fight was a stay-busy affair against Young Gil Bae. Rungvisai was aggressive from the opening bell, dropping and stopping his opponent already near the end of the opening round.

=== Sor Rungvisai vs. Diaz ===
On the 6th of October 2018, Sor Rungvisai defended his title against game Super Flyweight contender Hiram Irak Diaz, Diaz was coming off of a 3-round technical draw against Adolfo Castillo as well as wins against former champions Hernán Márquez and Luis Concepción. Rungvisai beat Diaz by Unanimous Decision, Rungvisai controlled the action well throughout with frequent, hard shots to both the body and head.

=== Sor Rungvisai vs. Estrada II ===
On April 26, 2019, Srisaket Sor Rungvisai lost his title in a rematch with the highly-regarded Juan Francisco Estrada, Estrada won a Unanimous Decision with scores of 113-115 (x2) and 112-116 for Estrada.

Rungvisai came out in an orthodox stance at the start of the fight which helped Estrada get the upper hand in the early rounds. Estrada was dictating the pace early and won 5 of the first 6 rounds. Rungvisai switched back to southpaw in round 9 and managed to take 4 of the final 6 rounds on average.

In a post-fight interview, Estrada stated “If he wants a third fight, we’ll do it. However I’d prefer to unify first.”

=== Sor Rungvisai vs. Ruenroeng, Fajardo ===
On the 1st of August 2020, Sor Rungvisai faced former IBF Flyweight Champion Amnat Ruenroeng, Rungvisai beat Ruenroeng by 10 round Unanimous Decision (97-94, 96-93, 99-91.) He then beat Jomar Farjardo by TKO in round 2 of 8 on October 3.

=== Sor Rungvisai vs Kwanthai Sithmorseng ===
Five months after his fight with Jomar Farjardo, Srisaket was scheduled to fight the former WBA Minimunweight champion Kwanthai Sithmorseng at the Workpoint Studio in Bang Phun, Thailand.

Srisaket dominated the bout, managing to knock his opponent down in the third round. Kwanthai's corner decided to retire at the end of the third round, awarding Srisaket the TKO victory.

==== Sor Rungvisai vs. Jesse Rodriguez ====
Srisaket faced Jesse Rodriguez for WBC super flyweight title on June 25, 2022. This was Rungvisai's first fight after 16 month layoff. The title bout was booked as the main event of a DAZN broadcast card, which took place at the Tech Port Arena in San Antonio, Texas. For this occasion, renowned Thai designer Moo Asava also designed a pair of boxing shorts and a robe for him, incorporating Thai-inspired elements with M-150, his sponsor, into the designs. He lost the fight by an eight-round technical knockout, stopping with a flurry of punches at the 1:50 minute mark. He knocked his opponent down once prior to the stoppage, dropping Sor Rungvisai with a left hook a minute into the seventh round. Rodriguez outlanded Sor Rungvisai in both total punches landed (233 to 84) and power punches landed (119 to 72). Following this victory, Rodriguez extended his contract with Matchroom Boxing.

== Professional boxing record ==
| 66 fights | 58 wins | 7 losses |
|---|---|---|
| By knockout | 47 | 3 |
| By decision | 11 | 4 |
| Draws | 1 | |

| No. | Result | Record | Opponent | Type | Round, time | Date | Location | Notes |
|---|---|---|---|---|---|---|---|---|
| 66 | Loss | 58–7–1 | Kaito Yamasaki | UD | 8 | Apr 13, 2025 | Sumiyoshi Ward Center, Osaka, Japan | |
| 65 | Win | 58–6–1 | Chalam Singmanasak | KO | 1 (6), 2:50 | Nov 29, 2024 | Suan Lum Night Bazaar Ratchadaphisek, Bangkok, Thailand | |
| 64 | Win | 57–6–1 | Wuttichai Yurachai | UD | 6 | Aug 30, 2024 | Suan Lum Night Bazaar Ratchadaphisek, Bangkok, Thailand | |
| 63 | Win | 56–6–1 | Luan Guangheng | UD | 6 | Feb 23, 2024 | Max Muay Thai Stadium, Pattaya, Thailand | |
| 62 | Win | 55–6–1 | Kritiphak Duangnut | UD | 6 | Dec 23, 2023 | Suan Lum Night Bazaar Ratchadaphisek, Bangkok, Thailand | |
| 61 | Win | 54–6–1 | Sukpraserd Ponpitak | TKO | 5 (6) | Oct 28, 2023 | Suan Lum Night Bazaar Ratchadaphisek, Bangkok, Thailand | |
| 60 | Win | 53–6–1 | Anan Pongkhet | TKO | 3 (6) | Aug 26, 2023 | Suan Lum Night Bazaar Ratchadaphisek, Bangkok, Thailand | |
| 59 | Win | 52–6–1 | Eaktwan BTU Ruaviking | UD | 8 | May 27, 2023 | Thupatemi Stadium, Pathum Thani, Thailand | |
| 58 | Win | 51–6–1 | Pipat Chaiporn | TKO | 3 (8), 1:56 | Mar 25, 2023 | Thupatemi Stadium, Pathum Thani, Thailand | |
| 57 | Loss | 50–6–1 | Jesse Rodríguez | TKO | 8 (12) 1:50 | Jun 25, 2022 | Tech Port Arena, San Antonio, Texas, U.S. | For WBC super-flyweight title |
| 56 | Win | 50–5–1 | Kwanthai Sithmorseng | RTD | 3 (10), 3:00 | Mar 12, 2021 | Workpoint Studio, Bang Phun, Thailand | |
| 55 | Win | 49–5–1 | Jomar Fajardo | TKO | 2 (8), 2:59 | Oct 3, 2020 | Workpoint Studio, Bang Phun, Thailand | |
| 54 | Win | 48–5–1 | Amnat Ruenroeng | UD | 10 | Aug 1, 2020 | Workpoint Studio, Bang Phun, Thailand | |
| 53 | Loss | 47–5–1 | Juan Francisco Estrada | UD | 12 | Apr 26, 2019 | The Forum, Inglewood, California, U.S. | Lost WBC and The Ring super-flyweight titles |
| 52 | Win | 47–4–1 | Iran Diaz | UD | 12 | Oct 6, 2018 | Impact Arena, Pak Kret, Thailand | Retained WBC and The Ring super-flyweight titles |
| 51 | Win | 46–4–1 | Young Gil Bae | TKO | 1 (10), 2:50 | Jul 21, 2018 | Workpoint Studio, Bang Phun, Thailand | |
| 50 | Win | 45–4–1 | Juan Francisco Estrada | MD | 12 | Feb 24, 2018 | The Forum, Inglewood, California, U.S. | Retained WBC super-flyweight title; Won inaugural The Ring super-flyweight title |
| 49 | Win | 44–4–1 | Román González | KO | 4 (12), 1:18 | Sep 9, 2017 | StubHub Center, Carson, California, U.S. | Retained WBC super-flyweight title |
| 48 | Win | 43–4–1 | Román González | MD | 12 | Mar 18, 2017 | Madison Square Garden, New York City, New York, U.S. | Won WBC super-flyweight title |
| 47 | Win | 42–4–1 | Oley Taladklangladsawai | TKO | 4 (6) | Dec 15, 2016 | Nonthaburi, Thailand | |
| 46 | Win | 41–4–1 | Suriya Maneephan | TKO | 4 (6) | Aug 31, 2016 | Pathum Thani, Thailand | |
| 45 | Win | 40–4–1 | Daetcharit Sitlekpet | TKO | 3 (6) | Jun 3, 2016 | Pathum Thani, Thailand | |
| 44 | Win | 39–4–1 | Ical Tobida | TKO | 6 (6), 1:29 | Apr 8, 2016 | Pathum Thani, Thailand | |
| 43 | Win | 38–4–1 | Arega Yunian | TKO | 4 (6) | Jan 22, 2016 | Ratchaburi, Thailand | |
| 42 | Win | 37–4–1 | Frans Damur Palue | TKO | 3 (6) | Nov 20, 2015 | Pathum Thani, Thailand | |
| 41 | Win | 36–4–1 | Hendrik Barongsay | KO | 2 (6) | Aug 18, 2015 | Pathum Thani, Thailand | |
| 40 | Win | 35–4–1 | Jack Amisa | TKO | 1 (6) | Jul 17, 2015 | Pathum Thani, Thailand | |
| 39 | Win | 34–4–1 | José Salgado | TKO | 4 (12), 1:53 | May 28, 2015 | Nakhon Ratchasima, Thailand | Won vacant WBC Silver super-flyweight title |
| 38 | Win | 33–4–1 | Madit Sada | KO | 3 (6) | Mar 20, 2015 | Bangkok, Thailand | |
| 37 | Win | 32–4–1 | Ardi Tefa | TKO | 3 (6) | Jan 23, 2015 | Bangkok, Thailand | |
| 36 | Win | 31–4–1 | Jemmy Gobel | TKO | 2 (6), 2:27 | Dec 19, 2014 | Samut Prakan, Thailand | |
| 35 | Win | 30–4–1 | Bobby Concepcion | KO | 3 (12), 0:48 | Nov 28, 2014 | Nonthaburi, Thailand | Retained WBC–ABCO super-flyweight title |
| 34 | Win | 29–4–1 | Boido Simanjuntak | TKO | 6 (6) | Oct 10, 2014 | Ratchaburi, Thailand | |
| 33 | Win | 28–4–1 | Zoren Pama | TD | 7 (12) | Sep 19, 2014 | Saraburi, Thailand | Won vacant WBC–ABCO super-flyweight title; TD after Sor Rungvisai cut from accidental head clash |
| 32 | Loss | 27–4–1 | Carlos Cuadras | TD | 8 (12), 0:29 | May 31, 2014 | Sala de Armas Agustín Melgar, Mexico City, Mexico | Lost WBC super-flyweight title; Unanimous TD after Cuadras cut from accidental head clash |
| 31 | Win | 27–3–1 | Chatri Sariphan | TKO | 4 (6) | Apr 8, 2014 | Pathum Thani, Thailand | |
| 30 | Win | 26–3–1 | Den Nattapol Gym | KO | 1 (6), 2:58 | Mar 7, 2014 | Bangkok, Thailand | |
| 29 | Win | 25–3–1 | Alexis Barateau | KO | 2 (6), 2:42 | Feb 18, 2014 | Bangkok, Thailand | |
| 28 | Win | 24–3–1 | Joel Kwong | TKO | 1 (6) | Jan 21, 2014 | Pathum Thani, Thailand | |
| 27 | Win | 23–3–1 | Hirofumi Mukai | TKO | 9 (12), 1:44 | Nov 15, 2013 | Nakhon Ratchasima, Thailand | Retained WBC super-flyweight title |
| 26 | Win | 22–3–1 | Petch Pitigym | KO | 2 (6) | Oct 8, 2013 | Pathum Thani, Thailand | |
| 25 | Win | 21–3–1 | Roque Lauro | PTS | 6 | Sep 6, 2013 | Bangkok, Thailand | |
| 24 | Win | 20–3–1 | Joan Imperial | TKO | 2 (6), 2:15 | Jul 19, 2013 | King Ramesuan Provincial Stadium, Lop Buri, Thailand | |
| 23 | Win | 19–3–1 | Yota Sato | TKO | 8 (12), 1:26 | May 3, 2013 | Khonmuangsri Stadium, Sisaket, Thailand | Won WBC super-flyweight title |
| 22 | Win | 18–3–1 | Den Sithsaithong | KO | 2 (6) | Mar 18, 2013 | Bangkok, Thailand | |
| 21 | Win | 17–3–1 | Manot Comput | TKO | 1 (6), 1:18 | Jan 28, 2013 | Suphan Buri, Thailand | |
| 20 | Win | 16–3–1 | Alvin Bais | KO | 2 (12), 2:12 | Dec 3, 2012 | Bangkok, Thailand | Retained WBC–ABCO super-flyweight title |
| 19 | Win | 15–3–1 | Boy Tanto | TKO | 4 (6), 1:31 | Oct 16, 2012 | Pathum Thani, Thailand | |
| 18 | Win | 14–3–1 | Lionel Mark Duran | TKO | 2 (12), 2:57 | Jul 2, 2012 | Minburi, Thailand | Retained WBC–ABCO super-flyweight title |
| 17 | Win | 13–3–1 | Wilber Andogan | TKO | 4 (12), 2:51 | May 8, 2012 | Nakhon Pathom, Thailand | Retained WBC–ABCO super-flyweight title |
| 16 | Win | 12–3–1 | Dondon Jimenea | TD | 4 (6) | Jan 17, 2012 | Thesabarn Muang Ladluwong, Phra Pradaeng, Thailand | TD after Jimenea cut from accidental head clash |
| 15 | Win | 11–3–1 | Yudi Arema | KO | 4 (12), 0:35 | Nov 4, 2011 | National Stadium Gymnasium, Bangkok, Thailand | Retained WBC–ABCO super-flyweight title |
| 14 | Win | 10–3–1 | Jeerasak Sithtanwalek | KO | 1 (6) | Oct 11, 2011 | Pathum Thani, Thailand | |
| 13 | Win | 9–3–1 | Yodpetchjing Por Kobkua | KO | 1 (6) | Aug 19, 2011 | Khonmuangsri Stadium, Sisaket, Thailand | |
| 12 | Win | 8–3–1 | Erick Diaz Siregar | KO | 5 (12), 2:22 | Jun 14, 2011 | Bangphonua, Pathum Thani, Thailand | Won vacant WBC–ABCO super-flyweight title |
| 11 | Win | 7–3–1 | Khompetch Sithsamart | TKO | 2 (6) | Apr 12, 2011 | Mai Khao Beach, Phuket, Thailand | |
| 10 | Win | 6–3–1 | Monsawan Sor Singdech | KO | 3 (6), 1:37 | Mar 3, 2011 | Phra Samut Chedi, Thailand | |
| 9 | Win | 5–3–1 | Takeshi Okamitsu | KO | 1 (6) | Dec 24, 2010 | Rajabhat University, Sisaket, Thailand | |
| 8 | Win | 4–3–1 | Johan Wahyudi | TKO | 4 (6) | Oct 8, 2010 | Muang Noi, Thailand | |
| 7 | Win | 3–3–1 | Ocean Sor Jittigym | TKO | 4 (6) | Jul 20, 2010 | Thung Jeang Sport Stadium, Trang, Thailand | |
| 6 | Win | 2–3–1 | Sorasak Lor Laitha Gym | TKO | 2 (6) | Apr 23, 2010 | Phayu, Thailand | |
| 5 | Loss | 1–3–1 | Kenji Oba | UD | 10 | Feb 7, 2010 | Kyuden Kinen Gymnasium, Fukuoka, Japan | |
| 4 | Win | 1–2–1 | Prakaipetch Aunsawan | TKO | 3 (6) | Nov 16, 2009 | Pamok School, Ang Thong, Thailand | |
| 3 | Draw | 0–2–1 | Nawaphon Kaikanha | PTS | 6 | Aug 14, 2009 | Ban Phai, Thailand | |
| 2 | Loss | 0–2 | Yushin Yafuso | KO | 3 (6), 2:20 | Jun 21, 2009 | Diamond Hall, Okinawa, Japan | |
| 1 | Loss | 0–1 | Akira Yaegashi | TKO | 3 (8), 2:11 | Mar 17, 2009 | Korakuen Hall, Tokyo, Japan | |

== See also ==
- List of world super-flyweight boxing champions

Sporting positions
World boxing titles
| Preceded by Yota Sato | WBC super-flyweight champion May 3, 2013 – May 31, 2014 | Succeeded by Carlos Cuadras |
| Preceded by Román González | WBC super-flyweight champion March 18, 2017 – April 26, 2019 | Succeeded by Juan Francisco Estrada |
| Inaugural champion | The Ring super-flyweight champion February 24, 2018 – April 27, 2019 | Succeeded by Juan Francisco Estrada |
Awards
| Previous: Vasyl Lomachenko | HBO Fighter of the Year; 2017 | Award discontinued |
| Previous: Hassan N'Dam N'Jikam; KO1 Alfonso Blanco | ESPN Knockout of the Year; KO4 Román González; 2017 | Next: Murat Gassiev; KO12 Yuniel Dorticos |
