= Gennady Golovkin vs. Daniel Jacobs =

Boxing competition

Middleweight Madness
- Date: March 18, 2017
- Venue: Madison Square Garden, New York City, New York, U.S.
- Title(s) on the line: WBA (Super), WBC, and IBO middleweight titles

Tale of the tape
Boxer	Gennady Golovkin	Daniel Jacobs
Nickname	GGG	Miracle Man
Hometown	Karagandy, Kazakhstan	Brooklyn, New York, U.S.
Pre-fight record	36–0 (33 KO)	32–1 (29 KO)
Height	5 ft 10 1/2 in (179 cm)	5 ft 11 1/2 in (182 cm)
Weight	159.6 lb (72 kg)	159.8 lb (72 kg)
Style	Orthodox	Orthodox (Note: Listed by BoxRec as orthodox, but regularly switch hits as a southpaw.)
Recognition	WBA (Super), WBC, IBF, and IBO middleweight champion The Ring No. 4 ranked pound-for-pound fighter	WBA (Regular) middleweight champion

Result
- Golovkin wins via 12-round unanimous decision (115–112, 115–112, 114–113)

Gennady Golovkin vs. Daniel Jacobs, billed as Middleweight Madness, was a professional boxing fight contested for the unified WBA (Super), WBC, IBF, IBO championship. The bout was on March 18, 2017, at Madison Square Garden in New York City, New York. It was televised on HBO pay-per-view in the United States, and on BoxNation in the United Kingdom.

== Background ==
Following Gennady Golovkin's win over Kell Brook, there were immediate talks of a WBA unification fight against 'Regular' champion Daniel Jacobs, as part of WBA's plan to reduce the amount of world titles in each division from three to one. Team Golovkin spoke of fighting Billy Joe Saunders after the Jacobs fight which would be a middleweight unification fight for all the belts.

The date discussed initially was 10 December, which Golovkin's team had on hold for Madison Square Garden. The date was originally set by HBO for Álvarez after he defeated Liam Smith, but Canelo confirmed he would not be fighting again until 2017 after fracturing his right thumb. There was ongoing negotiations between Tom Loeffler and Al Haymon about the split in purses, if the fight goes to purse bids, it would be a 75–25 split with Golovkin taking the majority due to him being the 'Super' champion. As the negotiations continued, Jacobs wanted a better split, around 60–40. The WBA granted an extension for the negotiation period on 7 October, as the two sides originally had until October 10 to come to an arrangement or else a purse bid would be due. There was also a request to change the purse bid split to 60–40, which the WBA declined. Golovkin started his training camp for the fight on 17 October.

Loeffler told the LA Times on 18 October that although the negotiations were still active, the fight would not take place on December 10. A new date for early 2017 would need to be set, still looking at Madison Square Garden to host the fight. Golovkin prides himself on being an extremely active fighter, and this is the first year since 2012 that he has been in fewer than three fights. WBA president Gilberto Mendoza confirmed in an email to RingTV that a deal had to be made by 5pm on December 7 or a purse bid would be held on December 19 in Panama. Later that day, the WBA announced a purse bid would be scheduled with a minimum bid of $400,000, with Golovkin receiving 75% and Jacobs 25%. Although purse bids were announced, Loeffler stated he would carry on negotiations, hopeful that a deal would be reached before the purse bid.

On December 17, terms were finally agreed, and it was announced that the fight would take place at Madison Square Garden in New York City on March 18, 2017, broadcast exclusively on HBO PPV. Golovkin tweeted the announcement whilst Jacobs uploaded a short video on social media. At the time of the fight, the fighters had a combined 35 consecutive knockouts. It was reported that Golovkin's IBO world title would not be at stake, but the IBO website later confirmed the belt would be at stake. HBO officially announced the fight on December 22, billed as "Middleweight Madness". Loeffler confirmed there was no rematch clause in place.

== Weigh in ==
At the official weigh-in, a day before the fight, Golovkin tipped the scales at 159.6 lb, while Jacobs weighed 159.8 lb. Jacobs declined to compete for the IBF title by skipping a fight-day weight check. Unlike other major sanctioning bodies, the IBF requires participants in title fights to submit to a weight check on the morning of the fight, as well as the official weigh-in the day before the fight; at the morning weight check, they can weigh no more than 10 pounds (4.5 kg) above the fight's weight limit.

Thus far, the IBF title was not on the line for Jacobs, as he skipped the procedure. HBO's Max Kellerman assumed that this was a part of the Team Jacobs' strategic plan, "because no one, in the end, is gonna remember who won the belt, they're gonna remember who won the fight." Kellerman, Jim Lampley and Roy Jones Jr. estimated that Jacobs came to fight Golovkin weighing around 180 pounds, therefore being a legitimate light heavyweight that night with a considerably increased punching power.

== Fight details ==
In front of a sell out crowd of 19,939, the fight went the full 12 rounds. This was the first time that Golovkin fought 12 rounds in his professional career. Golovkin's ring control, constant forward pressure and effective jab lead to a 115–112, 115–112, 114-113 unanimous decision victory, ending his 23 fight knockout streak which dated back to November 2008. ESPN had Golovkin winning 115–112. The opening three rounds were quiet with very little action. In the fourth round, Golovkin dropped Jacobs with a short right hand along the ropes for a flash knockdown. Jacobs recovered, but Golovkin controlled most of the middle rounds. Jacobs was effective in switching between orthodox and southpaw stance, but remained on the back foot. Both boxers were warned once in the fight by referee Charlie Fitch for rabbit punching.

Following the fight, some doubted Golovkin did enough to win. Jacobs thought he had won the fight by two rounds and attributed the loss to the potential big money fight that is Golovkin vs. Canelo. Jacobs also stated after being knocked down, he told Golovkin, "he'd have to kill me." In the post-fight interview, Golovkin said, “I’m a boxer, not a killer. I respect the game.” Before revenue shares, it was reported that Golovkin would earn at least $2.5 million compared to Jacobs' $1.75 million.

=== CompuBox stats ===
According to CompuBox punch stats, Golovkin landed 231 of 615 punches (38%) which was more than Jacobs who landed 175 of 541 (32%).

Fighter	Total punches	Total Jabs	Power punches
Golovkin	231/615	105/356	126/259
Golovkin	37.6%	29.5%	48.6%
Jacobs	175/541	31/170	144/371
Jacobs	32.3%	18.2%	38.8%

== Reception ==
On March 24, Tom Loeffler revealed the fight generated 170,000 pay-per-view buys. A replay was shown on HBO later in the week and averaged 709,000 viewers. Lance Pugmire from LA Times reported the live gate was $3.7 million, a big increase from the Golovkin vs. Lemieux PPV which achieved $2 million. He also said that merchandise and sponsors were higher.

== Official scorecards ==
Judge	Fighter	1	2	3	4	5	6	7	8	9	10	11	12	Total
Max DeLuca	Golovkin	10	9	10	10	10	9	9	10	10	9	9	9	114
Max DeLuca	Jacobs	9	10	9	8	9	10	10	9	9	10	10	10	113
Don Trella	Golovkin	10	9	10	10	10	9	9	10	10	9	9	10	115
Don Trella	Jacobs	9	10	9	8	9	10	10	9	9	10	10	9	112
Steve Weisfeld	Golovkin	10	10	9	10	10	9	10	10	10	9	9	9	115
Steve Weisfeld	Jacobs	9	9	10	8	9	10	9	9	9	10	10	10	112

== Fight card ==
Weight class		vs.		Type	Round	Time	Notes
Middleweight	(Kazakhstan) Gennady Golovkin (c)	def.	(United States) Daniel Jacobs	UD	12/12
Super flyweight	(Thailand) Srisaket Sor Rungvisai	def.	(Nicaragua) Román González (c)	MD	12/12
Super flyweight	(Mexico) Carlos Cuadras	def.	(Mexico) David Carmona	UD	10/10
Lightweight	(United States) Ryan Martin (c)	def.	(United States) Bryant Cruz	TKO	8/10	0:45
Middleweight	(Republic of Ireland) Andy Lee	def.	(United States) KeAndrae Leatherwood	UD	8/8
Heavyweight	(United States) Matt McKinney	def.	(United Kingdom) Jay McFarlane	UD	4/4
Super welterweight	(Ukraine) Serhii Bohachuk	def.	(Cuba) Yasmani Pedroso	TKO	3/4	2:28

== Fight purses ==
Guaranteed base purses

- Gennady Golovkin ($2.5 million) vs. Daniel Jacobs ($1.75 million)
- Román González ($550,000) vs. Srisaket Sor Rungvisai. ($75,000)

== Notes ==
Preceded by vs. Kell Brook	Gennady Golovkin's bouts March 18, 2017	Succeeded by vs. Canelo Álvarez
Preceded by vs. Sergio Mora	Daniel Jacobs's bouts March 18, 2017	Succeeded by vs. Luís Arias
