= Phumelele Cafu =

South African boxer

Phumelela Cafu
Personal information
- Nickname: Truth
- Born: 26 July 1998 (age 28) Duncan Village, Eastern Cape, South Africa
- Height: 5 ft 6 in (168 cm)
- Weight: Flyweight; Super flyweight

Boxing career
- Reach: 64 in (163 cm)
- Stance: Orthodox

Boxing record
- Total fights: 14
- Wins: 11
- Win by KO: 8
- Losses: 1
- Draws: 3

Phumelela Cafu (born 26 July 1998), is a South African professional boxer who held the World Boxing Organization (WBO) super flyweight title from 2024 to 2025.

== Professional career ==
Cafu turned professional in 2018 & compiled a record of 10–0–3 before facing & defeating Kosei Tanaka to win the WBO super-flyweight title.

On 30 Apr 2025, it was announced that Cafu would make the first defense of his WBO super flyweight title against Jesse Rodriguez in a WBO and WBC unification match on 19 July 2025

== Professional boxing record ==
15 fights	11 wins	1 loss
By knockout	8	1
By decision	3	0
Draws	3	

No.	Result	Record	Opponent	Type	Round, time	Date	Location	Notes
15	Loss	11–1–3	Jesse Rodriguez	TKO	10 (12), 2:07	19 Jul 2025	Ford Center at The Star, Frisco, Texas, U.S.	Lost WBO super-flyweight title; For WBC and The Ring super-flyweight titles
14	Win	11–0–3	Kosei Tanaka	SD	12	14 Oct 2024	Ariake Arena, Tokyo, Japan	Won WBO super-flyweight title
13	Win	10–0–3	Enathi Stelle	KO	1 (12)	16 Dec 2023	International Convention Centre, East London, South Africa	Won vacant South African super-flyweight title
12	Win	9–0–3	Genisis Libranza	UD	10	20 Aug 2023	Orlando Community Hall, Soweto, South Africa	Won vacant IBF International super-flyweight title
11	Win	8–0–3	Jackson Chauke	SD	12	23 Dec 2022	Orient Theatre, East London, South Africa	
10	Win	7–0–3	Lazarus Namalambo	KO	2 (8)	23 Oct 2022	International Convention Centre, East London, South Africa	
9	Win	6–0–3	Ben Mananquil	RTD	5 (12)	29 Jul 2022	International Convention Centre, East London, South Africa	
8	Win	5–0–3	Tinashe Majoni	KO	5 (6)	28 May 2022	International Convention Centre, East London, South Africa	
7	Draw	4–0–3	Jackson Chauke	MD	12	27 Mar 2022	International Convention Centre, East London, South Africa	For South African flyweight title
6	Win	4–0–2	Hamza Mchanjo	TKO	4 (12)	28 Sep 2019	Portuguese Hall, Johannesburg, South Africa	Won WBF International flyweight title
5	Draw	3–0–2	Zolile Miya	PTS	10	30 Jun 2019	Community Hall, KwaThema, South Africa	
4	Win	3–0–1	Dalisizwe Komani	TKO	2 (10)	15 Dec 2018	Msobomvu Hall, Butterworth, South Africa	
3	Win	2–0–1	Thandolwethu Nkwenteni	TKO	4 (6)	4 Nov 2018	Indoor Sports Centre, Queenstown, South Africa	
2	Draw	1–0–1	Landile Ngxeke	PTS	4	24 Jun 2018	Gompo Hall, East London, South Africa	
1	Win	1–0	Phumelelo Maqolo	TKO	2 (4)	26 May 2018	Town Hall, Dutywa, South Africa	

== See also ==
- List of male boxers
- List of southpaw stance boxers
- List of world super-flyweight boxing champions

Sporting positions
Regional boxing titles
Vacant Title last held by Jackson Chauke	WBF International flyweight champion 28 September 2019 – 2022; Vacated	Vacant Title next held by Daniel Pontac
Vacant Title last held by Sunny Edwards	IBF International super-flyweight champion 20 August 2023 – 14 October 2024; Won world title	Vacant
Vacant Title last held by Landile Ngxeke	South African super-flyweight champion 16 December 2023 – 2024; Vacated	Vacant Title next held by Lwando Mgambi
World boxing titles
Preceded by Kosei Tanaka	WBO super-flyweight champion 14 October 2024 – 19 July 2025	Succeeded by Jesse Rodeiguez
