= Jesse Rodriguez =

American boxer (born 2000)

Personal information
- Nickname: Bam
- Born: Jesse James Rodriguez Franco; January 20, 2000 (age 26) San Antonio, Texas, U.S.
- Height: 5 ft 4 in (163 cm)
- Weight: Light flyweight; Flyweight; Super flyweight; Bantamweight

Boxing career
- Reach: 67 in (170 cm)
- Stance: Southpaw

Boxing record
- Total fights: 24
- Wins: 24
- Win by KO: 17
Medal record
Men's Amateur boxing
Representing United States
Junior World Championships
Silver medal – second place	2015 St. Petersburg	Pinweight

Jesse James Rodriguez Franco (born January 20, 2000) is an American professional boxer. He has held multiple world championships in three weight classes and is currently the World Boxing Association (WBA) (Super version) bantamweight champion.

In February 2022, after moving up two weight classes, Rodriguez won the WBC super flyweight title by defeating Carlos Cuadras, becoming the youngest world champion at that time, and the first fighter born in the 2000s to claim a world title. He defended the belt twice before moving down to flyweight and unifying the WBO and IBF titles in 2023. In June 2024, he made his return to the super flyweight division by defeating Juan Francisco Estrada to recapture the WBC super flyweight title and claim the Ring magazine belt. In July 2025, Rodriguez defeated Phumelele Cafu by TKO in the tenth round to secure the WBO super flyweight title, unifying belts in a second weight class, and later added the WBA title by knocking out Fernando Martínez.

== Early life ==
Rodriguez was born and raised in San Antonio, Texas. His parents are Jesse Rodriguez and Maria Franco, and he is the youngest of four brothers. During his youth, he had an interest in skateboarding and also played football. At nine years old, he accompanied his older brother Joshua Franco to the San Fernando Boxing Club for a couple of weeks to watch him train, before giving it a try himself. It eventually led him to drop out of the seventh grade and switch to homeschooling to focus more fully on boxing.

During his early years, Rodriguez trained under local coach Martin Barrios, father of WBC welterweight champion Mario Barrios. He met his future trainer Robert Garcia in 2012 at an open workout in San Antonio with Nonito Donaire, his favorite fighter at the time.

== Amateur career ==
A successful amateur boxer, Rodriguez won the Region 6 Silver Gloves Championships in North Little Rock, Arkansas, in the 75-pound division just before his 13th birthday on January 12, 2013. He went on to win back-to-back National PAL Championships in 2013 and 2014. He also captured back-to-back U.S. Junior National Championships—at pinweight in 2015 and light flyweight in 2016—and was honored with the Outstanding Junior Male Boxer of the Tournament award. Later in 2016, Rodriguez won the U.S. Junior Olympic National Championships, again at light flyweight.

At the international level, Rodriguez won the silver medal at the 2015 Junior World Championships, losing in the final to Cosmin Gîrleanu.

== Professional career ==
=== Early career ===
Rodríguez made his professional debut against Mauricio Cruz on March 10, 2017, after being discovered by Danny Rangel, winning by unanimous decision. By the end of 2019, Rodríguez amassed a 10–0 record, with six of those victories coming by way of stoppage.

Rodríguez was scheduled to face Marco Sustaita on February 29, 2020, on the undercard of the Mikey Garcia versus Jessie Vargas bout. Rodríguez won the fight by eighth-round technical knockout. Rodríguez was next scheduled to face the one-time WBC light flyweight title challenger Janiel Rivera on September 5, 2020. He won the fight by a first-round knockout, managing to drop Rivera three times by the 2 minute mark of the opening round. Rodríguez was scheduled to fight Saul Juarez on December 12, 2020, on the undercard of the Shakur Stevenson and Toka Kahn Clary junior lightweight bout. Rodríguez lived up to his role as the significant betting favorite, knocking Juarez out in the second.

Rodríguez was expected to challenge the reigning WBA (Regular) champion Esteban Bermudez in late 2021, however the fight was later cancelled as it didn't receive approval from the WBA. Rodríguez was instead scheduled to face Jose Alejandro Burgos on October 16, 2021, whom he beat by a fourth-round knockout.

=== Super flyweight ===
==== Rodriguez vs. Cuadras ====
Rodriguez was expected to face Fernando Diaz for the WBC USNBC flyweight title on February 5, 2022, on the undercard of the vacant WBC super-flyweight title bout between Srisaket Sor Rungvisai and Carlos Cuadras. Soon after this fight was revealed, it was announced that Rodriguez had signed a promotional deal with Eddie Hearn's Matchroom Boxing. On January 31, it was announced that Rodriguez would be fighting 34 year old veteran Cuadras for the vacant title, as Rungvisai had withdrawn. For the fight, Cuadras was coming off a loss and 15 months of inactivity. Rodriguez won the fight by unanimous decision. Two judges scored the fight 117–110 for him, while the third judge scored the bout 115–112 in his favor. He scored the sole knockdown of the fight in the third round, flooring Cuadras with a right uppercut. Winning the title made Rodriguez the youngest active titlist in the sport.

==== Rodriguez vs. Sor Rungvisai ====
Rodriguez was scheduled to make his first title defense against 35 year old veteran, former super flyweight titlist Srisaket Sor Rungvisai on June 25, 2022. This was Rungvisai's first fight after 16 month layoff. The title bout was booked as the main event of a DAZN broadcast card, which took place at the Tech Port Arena in San Antonio, Texas. Rodriguez won the fight by an eight-round technical knockout, stopping Sor Rungvisai with a flurry of punches at the 1:50 minute mark. He knocked his opponent down once prior to the stoppage, dropping Sor Rungvisai with a left hook a minute into the seventh round. Rodriguez outlanded Sor Rungvisai in both total punches landed (233 to 84) and power punches landed (119 to 72). Following this victory, Rodriguez extended his contract with Matchroom Boxing.

==== Rodriguez vs. González ====
Rodriguez made his second title defense against the three-time super flyweight world title challenger, and the #10 ranked WBC contender, Israel González. The fight was scheduled as the co-headliner of the Canelo Álvarez vs. Gennady Golovkin III DAZN pay per view, which took place at the T-Mobile Arena in Paradise, Nevada on September 17, 2022. Rodriguez retained his title by unanimous decision, with scores of 118–109, 117–110 and 114–113. He was deducted a point in the eight round for landing a low blow, which left González on the canvas. González was dropped with a low blow in the eleventh round as well, although no point was deducted.

On October 26, 2022, it was announced by the WBC that Rodriguez had vacated the super flyweight title in order to compete at flyweight.

=== Flyweight ===
==== Rodriguez vs. Gonzalez ====
On October 28, 2022, the WBO ratings committee approved a request for Rodriguez to be ranked as the top contender at flyweight and immediately challenge for the title. As Junto Nakatani vacated the belt in order to move up to super flyweight, the sanctioning body ordered a vacant title bout between Rodriguez and Cristian Gonzalez, their #2 ranked flyweight contender. The fight was booked to take place on April 8, 2023, at the Boeing Center at Techport in San Antonio, Texas. Rodriguez won the fight by unanimous decision, with scores of 116–112, 117–111 and 118–110, to once again become the youngest active titlist in the sport. He revealed, in the post-fight interview, that he had suffered a broken jaw in the sixth round. It was confirmed the following day that Rodriguez would have to undergo surgery to heal the injury.

==== Rodriguez vs. Edwards ====
Rodriguez faced the four-time defending IBF flyweight champion Sunny Edwards in the main event of a DAZN broadcast show on December 16, 2023, at the Desert Diamond Arena in Glendale, Arizona. He unified the titles by a ninth-round stoppage, as Edwards retired from the contest at the end of the round. Rodriguez was able to knock his opponent down once in the ninth round, dropping Edwards for the third time in his professional career. Rodriguez outlanded Edwards 238 to 138 in total punches and 180 to 75 in power punches, successfully landing 62% of his power shots. Afterwards, Edwards revealed he had suffered a fractured orbital bone earlier in the fight, causing him to see double.

=== Return to super flyweight ===
==== Rodriguez vs. Estrada, Guevara ====
It was reported on March 19, 2024, that Rodriguez was in negotiations with 34 year old veteran and WBC super flyweight champion Juan Francisco Estrada. On March 28, 2024, the fight was officially announced. The fight was scheduled to take place at the Footprint Center in Phoenix, Arizona on June 29, 2024. This was Estrada's first fight in 18 months. Despite suffering the first knockdown of his professional career in the 6th round, Rodriguez won the fight by a seventh round knockout. He dropped Estrada once in the fourth round, before a second and final knockdown in the seventh round by body shot, whereupon the fight was stopped as Estrada was counted out. The three official judges were split on their scorecards at the time of the stoppage: one had the Rodriguez up 58–54, the second judge had Estrada up 57–56, while the third judge saw the fight as a 56–56 draw.

On September 17, 2024 during a WBC conference, it was announced that Rodriguez would defend his WBC title against interim champion, 35-year-old Pedro Guevara (42–4–1, 22 KOs) on November 9 at the Wells Fargo Center in Philadelphia. The bout was scheduled as part of a DAZN card headlined by Jaron Ennis. Guevara was coming off a split decision win over Andrew Moloney. The card was formally announced three days later. On the announcement, Rodriguez stated, “On November 9… witness another exciting performance. My belts aren’t going anywhere.” Guevara promised an aggressive fight, “I am… going to prepare to put on a war… and to win on November 9 in Philadelphia.” Rodriguez retained his titles after stopping Guevara in the third round via TKO. Rodriguez controlled the bout from the opening bell, using sharp footwork and ring generalship to keep Guevara on the defensive and limit his offensive output. In the early rounds, Rodriguez dictated the pace with a mix of jabs, counters and body work. By the second round, Rodriguez had begun to land cleaner and heavier shots, including lead right hooks and body punches, while setting up uppercuts that visibly unsettled his Guevara. The fight ended in the third round when a series of straight left hands bloodied Guevara and led to the first knockdown. Although Guevara quickly rose, Rodriguez immediately increased the pressure and landed a short right uppercut in the corner that sent Guevara to the canvas again. Referee Ricky Gonzalez halted the contest at 2:47 of the round, awarding Rodriguez a technical knockout win, which marked the first stoppage loss of Guevara’s professional career. During the post-fight, Rodriguez stated he was interested in pursuing further high‑profile bouts, including potential title unifications at super flyweight. He also welcomed a possible fight against Román González, stating that he was “ready” for such an opportunity. Guevara ended his brief winning streak. He showed respect and applauded Rodriguez following the stoppage. Rodriguez landed 64 of his 183 punches thrown (35%) ad Guevara landed only 21 of 122 (17%).

==== Rodriguez vs. Cafu, Martinez ====
On April 29, 2025, it was announced that Rodriguez would face WBO champion Phumelele Cafu (11–0–3, 8 KOs) in a super flyweight unification bout on July 19 at the Ford Center at The Star in Frisco, Texas. The fight was scheduled as the main event of a DAZN card. Cafu became WBO champion by upsetting Kosei Tanaka and was expected to fight Román González, however that deal collapsed. The fight with Cafu was arranged after a proposed unification bout between Rodriguez and Fernando Martínez fell through. Rodriguez weighed 114.8 pounds and Cafu was on the 115 pounds limit. Rodriguez was a -2500 favorite entering the bout. Rodriguez defeated Cafu via 10th-round TKO, unifying the WBC, WBO, and Ring super flyweight titles, in a dominant performance that set up a future title bout against Fernando Martinez. Rodriguez established control with superior footwork, high guard, and precise combinations from the opening bell. By rounds three and four, he had out-landed Cafu, but he sustained a visible injury himself, a welt under his eye. Cafu found some success around the seventh round, landing body shots, but Rodriguez took over. In the ninth round, Rodriguez's body work visibly hurt Cafu, weakening his knees and slowing him down. In the tenth round, Rodriguez landed a right hook to the body, staggering Cafu. During a final clinch, both fighters fell to the canvas. When they both got back to their feet, Cafu’s corner threw in the towel at 2:07, securing the stoppage victory for Rodriguez. Following the win, Rodriguez said, “I felt like it was a good performance … probably my best performance up to today, against my toughest opponent. [Cafu was] a lot tougher than I thought he was going to be, but we got the job done no matter what.” According to CompuBox, Rodriguez out landed Cafu 218 to 144 in total punches.

On July 4, 2025, Turki Alalshikh announced that Rodriguez would be challenging Fernando Martínez (18–0, 9 KOs) next for his WBA super flyweight title in November, which was later confirmed to be November 22, in Riyadh, on the David Benavidez vs. Anthony Yarde undercard. Prior to the fight, it was revealed that Rodriguez would become a free agent following the bout as his contract with Matchroom Boxing was ending. Matchroom CEO Frank Smith was confident in securing a new deal to continue their relationship, stating, "I think we've done great things together and will continue to do great things. I'm excited about what the future holds." During fight week, Rodriguez expressed his intention to compete in two additional fights at his current weight class before transitioning to bantamweight. His goal was to capture the IBF title held by Willibaldo Garcia prior to making the move. He also indicated a desire to fight in Japan against opponents such as Naoya Inoue and Junto Nakatani. Rodriguez weighed 114.6 pounds and Martinez weighed 113.2 pounds. Rodriguez won by knockout in the tenth round, demonstrating a strong performance throughout the fight. He maintained control, winning all the rounds before the stoppage. Martinez had difficulty implementing any notable offense, as Rodriguez's accuracy and movement allowed him to stay in charge. In the tenth round, Rodriguez landed a well-timed left hook to Martinez's jaw, causing him to fall backward and leading the referee to count him out. According to CompuBox, Rodriguez landed 276 of 717 total punches (38%), while Martinez landed 131 of 520 thrown (25%). 232 shots landed by Rodriguez were power punches. Hearn later indicated that Rodriguez may consider moving up to the bantamweight division rather than pursuing an undisputed title at super flyweight.

In June 2026, the WBC declared its super flyweight title vacant after Rodriguez vacated the belt to move up to the bantamweight division.

=== Bantamweight ===
==== Rodriguez vs. Vargas ====
On March 13, 2026, it was reported that Rodriguez would be moving up in weight in a bid to become a 3-weight world champion. It was likely that his first fight at the new weight would be for a world title, as WBA champion Antonio Vargas (19–1–1, 11 KOs) was being discussed. Vargas last retained his belt in a draw against Daigo Higa in July 2025. A month later, the fight was made official to take place on June 13 at the Desert Diamond Arena in Glendale, Arizona, on DAZN. At the time, it was reported that Rodriguez had signed a multi-fight extension with Matchroom Boxing. On the announcement of the fight, Rodriguez said, "New weight class, same goals. Dominate and pick up all the belts. June 13th, I look forward to becoming a three-division world champ." During fight week, the WBA clarified their bantamweight title situation by officially recognizing Vargas as bantamweight champion. This resolved confusion caused by the WBA previously listing Seiya Tsutsumi as champion before later updating their rankings to show Vargas as titleholder instead. Tsutsumi was instead listed as “champion in recess” due to a medical condition. Both weighed in at 117.6 pounds.

Rodriguez defeated Vargas via sixth-round knockout to win the WBA title, becoming a three-division champion. Vargas started aggressively, throwing sharp combinations. His strategy was to challenge Rodriguez's movement. The fight remained competitive through the first four rounds, with Vargas showing resilience and some success in landing punches. In the fifth, Rodriguez dropped Vargas with a left hand. In the sixth round, Rodriguez delivered a knockout with a right-left combination, counting him out. According to CompuBox, Rodriguez landed 81 of 213 punches (38%) compared to Vargas’ 81 of 279 (29%). Rodriguez's trainer Robert Garcia indicated that he might take another fight at 118 pounds before moving up, with talks already in place to fight Naoya Inoue.

== Personal life ==
Rodriguez currently resides in San Antonio, Texas. He has been in a relationship with Rebecca Delic since 2020, and they have a daughter named Mila together. Their son was born in November 2025 during Rodriguez's time in Riyadh for his fight against Fernando Martínez, a victory he dedicated to his newborn.

In November 2016, Rodriguez entered into a managerial agreement with trainer Robert Garcia and was signed to a promotional pact with Teiken Promotions. In January 2022, he signed a multi-fight promotional deal with Eddie Hearn and Matchroom Boxing, later signing an extension in June, before penning a new agreement with the promotion in October 2024. Rodriguez is currently trained by Garcia, and during fight camps he regularly trains alongside his older brother Joshua Franco, a former WBA super flyweight champion.

== Professional boxing record ==
24 fights	24 wins	0 losses
By knockout	17	0
By decision	7	0

No.	Result	Record	Opponent	Type	Round, time	Date	Location	Notes
24	Win	24–0	Antonio Vargas	KO	6 (12) 1:15	Jun 13, 2026	Desert Diamond Arena, Glendale, Arizona, U.S.	Won WBA bantamweight title
23	Win	23–0	Fernando Martínez	KO	10 (12), 1:25	Nov 22, 2025	Kingdom Arena, Riyadh, Saudi Arabia	Retained WBC, WBO, and The Ring super flyweight titles; Won WBA super flyweight title
22	Win	22–0	Phumelele Cafu	TKO	10 (12), 2:07	Jul 19, 2025	Ford Center at The Star, Frisco, Texas, U.S.	Retained WBC and The Ring super flyweight titles; Won WBO super flyweight title
21	Win	21–0	Pedro Guevara	TKO	3 (12), 2:47	Nov 9, 2024	Wells Fargo Center, Philadelphia, Pennsylvania, U.S.	Retained WBC and The Ring super flyweight titles
20	Win	20–0	Juan Francisco Estrada	KO	7 (12), 3:00	Jun 29, 2024	Footprint Center, Phoenix, Arizona, U.S.	Won WBC and The Ring super flyweight titles
19	Win	19–0	Sunny Edwards	RTD	9 (12), 3:00	Dec 16, 2023	Desert Diamond Arena, Glendale, Arizona, U.S.	Retained WBO flyweight title; Won IBF flyweight title
18	Win	18–0	Cristian Gonzalez	UD	12	Apr 8, 2023	Boeing Center at Techport, San Antonio, Texas, U.S.	Won vacant WBO flyweight title
17	Win	17–0	Israel González	UD	12	Sep 17, 2022	T-Mobile Arena, Paradise, Nevada, U.S.	Retained WBC super flyweight title
16	Win	16–0	Srisaket Sor Rungvisai	TKO	8 (12), 1:50	Jun 25, 2022	Tech Port Arena, San Antonio, Texas, U.S.	Retained WBC super flyweight title
15	Win	15–0	Carlos Cuadras	UD	12	Feb 5, 2022	Footprint Center, Phoenix, Arizona, U.S.	Won vacant WBC super flyweight title
14	Win	14–0	Jose Alejandro Burgos	KO	4 (10), 1:23	Oct 16, 2021	Chukchansi Park, Fresno, California, U.S.	
13	Win	13–0	Saúl Juárez	KO	2 (8), 2:05	Dec 12, 2020	MGM Grand Conference Center, Paradise, Nevada, U.S.	
12	Win	12–0	Janiel Rivera	KO	1 (8), 2:03	Sep 5, 2020	MGM Grand Conference Center, Paradise, Nevada, U.S.	
11	Win	11–0	Marco Sustaita	TKO	8 (10), 1:10	Feb 29, 2020	Ford Center at The Star, Frisco, Texas, U.S.	
10	Win	10–0	Cesar Garcia Torrijos	TKO	3 (10), 2:23	Jul 27, 2019	Event Center, Floresville, Texas, U.S.	
9	Win	9–0	Rauf Aghayev	TKO	3 (10), 2:50	Mar 16, 2019	AT&T Stadium, Arlington, Texas, U.S.	
8	Win	8–0	Josue Morales	UD	6	Dec 1, 2018	Staples Center, Los Angeles, California, U.S.	
7	Win	7–0	Edwin Reyes	UD	8	Sep 30, 2018	Citizens Business Bank Arena, Ontario, California, U.S.	
6	Win	6–0	Armando Vazquez	KO	3 (6), 2:18	May 5, 2018	Dignity Health Sports Park, Carson, California, U.S.	
5	Win	5–0	Santiago Sanchez Bayardo	TKO	1 (4), 1:33	Mar 9, 2018	Mi Mercado Event Center, San Antonio, Texas, U.S.	
4	Win	4–0	Jorge Mosqueira	KO	2 (4), 1:22	Nov 17, 2017	Salon Mezzanine, Tijuana, Mexico	
3	Win	3–0	Robert Ledesma	UD	4	Jun 10, 2017	Event Center, San Antonio, Texas, U.S.	
2	Win	2–0	Erick Jovani Negrete	TKO	1 (4), 1:39	Apr 28, 2017	Salon Mezzanine, Tijuana, Mexico	
1	Win	1–0	Mauricio Cruz	UD	4	Mar 10, 2017	Carpa Astros, Tlalpan, Mexico	

== Titles in boxing ==
=== Major world titles ===
- IBF flyweight champion (112 lbs)
- WBO flyweight champion (112 lbs)
- WBA super flyweight champion (115 lbs)
- WBC super flyweight champion (115 lbs) (2×)
- WBO super flyweight champion (115 lbs)
- WBA (Super) bantamweight champion (118 lbs)

=== The Ring magazine titles ===
- The Ring super flyweight champion (115 lbs)

== Awards ==
- WBC Performance of the Year: 2024 vs. Juan Francisco Estrada
- WBC Revelation of the Year: 2022
- 2× ESPN Best Fighter Under the Age of 25: 2023, 2024
- ESPN Fighter of the Midyear: 2022
- WBN Pound-for-Pound Breakthrough: 2025
- 2× WBN Young Fighter of the Year: 2022, 2023
- The Fight City Fighter of the Year: 2022
- The Sweet Science (TSS) Breakthrough Fighter of the Year: 2022
- BOXRAW Breakout Star of the Year: 2022
- The Fight Site Breakout of the Year: 2022
- U.S. Junior National Championships Outstanding Junior Male Boxer of the Tournament: 2016

== See also ==
- List of male boxers
- Notable boxing families
- List of southpaw stance boxers
- List of Mexican boxing world champions
- List of world flyweight boxing champions
- List of world super-flyweight boxing champions
- List of world bantamweight boxing champions
- List of boxing triple champions

Sporting positions
World boxing titles
Vacant Title last held by Juan Francisco Estrada	WBC super-flyweight champion February 5 – October 26, 2022; Vacated	Vacant Title next held by Juan Francisco Estarda
Vacant Title last held by Junto Nakatani	WBO flyweight champion April 8, 2023 – March 29, 2024; Vacated	Vacant Title next held by Anthony Olascuaga
Preceded by Sunny Edwards	IBF flyweight champion December 16, 2023 – March 27, 2024; Vacated	Vacant Title next held by Ángel Ayala
Preceded by Juan Francisco Estrada	WBC super-flyweight champion June 29, 2024 – June 9, 2026; Vacated	Vacant
Preceded by Juan Francisco Estrada	The Ring super-flyweight champion June 29, 2024 – June 15, 2026; Vacated	Vacant
Preceded by Phumelele Cafu	WBO super-flyweight champion July 19, 2025 – June 10, 2026; Vacated	Vacant Title next held by Kenshiro Teraji
Preceded by Fernando Martínez	WBA super-flyweight champion November 23, 2025 – June 10, 2026; Vacated	Succeeded by David Jiménez; Interim champion promoted
Vacant Title last held by Naoya Inoue	WBA bantamweight champion Super title June 13, 2026 – present	Incumbent
