= José Salgado =

Mexican boxer

José Salgado Fernández
Personal information
- Nickname: Sugar
- Born: José Enrique Salgado Fernández; June 10, 1989 (age 37) Cozumel, Quintana Roo, Mexico
- Height: 5 ft 9 in (177 cm)
- Weight: Super flyweight; Bantamweight; Super bantamweight

Boxing career
- Reach: 72 in (183 cm)
- Stance: Orthodox

Boxing record
- Total fights: 43
- Wins: 36
- Win by KO: 29
- Losses: 5
- Draws: 2
- No contests: 0

José Enrique Salgado Fernández (born June 10, 1989) is a Mexican professional boxer and the current North American Boxing Association Super Flyweight Champion. Salgado is promoted by Saúl Álvarez' company Canelo Promotions.

== Professional career ==
Salgado began boxing from an early age, his father and uncles were boxers and as a result he grew up with a gym in his family home on the island of Cozumel. Growing up the young Salgado admired Mexican legend Erik Morales and began his professional boxing career in February 2007 at the age of 17. Joining the paid ranks at super flyweight he won his first fight by way of knockout with victory over Freddy Sierra which he followed the next month in similar fashion with a stoppage defeat of Jose Luis Chul.

=== First run at Super Flyweight ===
Showing the first evidence of his impressive power in the lower weight classes Salgado followed these initial victories with six more and by compiled a perfect record of 8–0 with all wins coming by way of knockout before being matched against Jeremias Segovia for the vacant WBC Youth World super flyweight title on 27 October 2007 where he continued his winning streak by stopping his opponent in the eighth round to earn his first championship.

Going on to fight 10 more times at super flyweight Salgado defended his WBC Youth World super flyweight title on six occasions and in the process triumphed over the likes of Miguel Tique and former two-time world title holder Melchor Cob Castro, defeating the latter to add the WBC Youth World Caribbean Boxing Federation (CABOFE) super flyweight title to his collection with a decision victory.

His 18 fight winning streak at super flyweight came to an end with a knockout defeat to Juan Jose Montes where he was stopped in the second round.

=== Move up to Bantamweight ===
Following his first loss Salgado made the move up to 118 pounds and made his debut at the weight in a title match against fellow Mexican Luis May for the interim WBC Youth Intercontinental bantamweight Title on 3 April 2004 at the Parque Andrés Quintana Roo in his native Cozumel. In front of a home crowd Salgado was triumphant after 10 rounds, winning a unanimous decision to take his first championship at the weight.

=== Rematch with Tique ===
In September 2010 José knocked out veteran Miguel Tique in rematch of their 2008 fight with a fourth round stoppage to win the vacant WBC Youth World super bantamweight title in his first fight at 122 pounds; an achievement that meant Salgado had now won minor titles in three different weight classes.

=== Return to Super Flyweight ===
Following on from his victory over Tique, Salgado added two knockout victories at bantamweight before moving back down to super flyweight with a third-round knockout over title contender Everardo Morales to win the vacant NABF super flyweight championship. He then went on to face challenger Carlos Ariel Farías who he stopped in the first round to add the vacant NABA super flyweight title.

=== WBA Super Flyweight Championship ===
On December 10, 2011, Salgado faced Liborio Solís for the interim WBA super flyweight title at Bicentennial Park in Nayarit, Mexico however was ultimately defeated by twelve round split decision with judges Luis Pabon and Jose Roberto Torres scoring the fight 117-11 for Solís whilst judge Jason Garcia scored it 117-111 for Salgado.

=== Regaining the NABF Championship ===
Following his loss to Solís, Salgado defeated Jesus Limones by fifth-round knockout followed by an eight-round draw with Cecilio Santos before he had the opportunity to regain the now vacant NABF super flyweight title after being matched with Fidel Colmenares on September 8, 2012, at the Arena Miguel Canto in Cozumel. Winning the bout with a first-round knockout Salgado recorded the 25th stoppage of his career in only his 31st contest.

=== WBC Super Flyweight Championship ===
After four successful defenses of his newly won title either side of a decision victory over Javier Armando Rodriguez, Salgado signed to fight Carlos Cuadras, who would be making the first defense of his WBC super flyweight title on September 20, 2014, at Estadio de Beisbol in Sinaloa, Mexico.

Aiming to win his first world title at the second attempt, Salgado was competitive in the early rounds despite suffering a suspected broken nose in the third round after being rocked by a straight right hand from Cuadras. However American referee Jay Nady was forced to stop the fight before the end of the fourth round after an accidental clash of heads a caused injury to the left eyelid of Salgado and, after checking with the ringside doctor, the fight was declared a technical draw with 32 seconds remaining in the round.

== Professional boxing record ==
42 fights	36 wins	4 losses
By knockout	29	2
By decision	7	2
Draws	2	

Result	Record	Opponent	Type	Round, time	Date	Location	Notes
Win	36–4–2	(Mexico) Alberto Cupido	TKO	? (10)	2018-01-20	Arena Miguel Canto Solis, Cozumel, Mexico	
Loss	35–4–2	(Mexico) Javier Gallo	SD	10	2017-04-15	(United States) Cache Creek Casino Resort, Brooks, USA	
Win	35–3–2	(Mexico) Erik Argaez	KO	2 (10)	2016-07-30	Arena Miguel Canto Solis, Cozumel, Mexico	
Loss	34–3–2	(Thailand) Wisaksil Wangek	TKO	4 (12)	2015-05-28	Liptapanlop Hall, Nakhon Ratchasima, Thailand	For vacant WBC Silver super flyweight title
Draw	34–2–2	(Mexico) Carlos Cuadras	TD	4 (12)	2014-09-20	Estadio de Beisbol, Guamuchil, Mexico	For WBC super flyweight title
