= McWilliams Arroyo =

Puerto Rican boxer

Personal information
- Born: McWilliams Arroyo Acevedo; December 5, 1985 (age 40) Ceiba, Puerto Rico
- Height: 5 ft 4 in (163 cm)
- Weight: Flyweight; Super flyweight

Boxing career
- Reach: 64 in (163 cm)
- Stance: Orthodox

Boxing record
- Total fights: 26
- Wins: 21
- Win by KO: 16
- Losses: 4
- No contests: 1
Medal record
Men's amateur boxing
Representing Puerto Rico
Pan American Games
Gold medal – first place	2007 Rio	Flyweight
Central American and Caribbean Games
Gold medal – first place	2006 Cartagena	Light flyweight
World Amateur Boxing Championships
Gold medal – first place	2009 Milan	Flyweight

McWilliams Arroyo Acevedo (born December 5, 1985) is a Puerto Rican professional boxer.

== Early life ==
McWilliams was born along his twin brother, McJoe, in the municipality of Ceiba in the northeast coastal region of Puerto Rico's main island. Their parents are Milagros Acevedo Hernández and José A. Arroyo Gelabert. Arroyo and his twin, were introduced to boxing in their childhood. At the age of 12, they entered Gimnasio Fito Ramos, a gymnasium located in the municipality of Fajardo, Puerto Rico. In this locale they met Anthony Otero, a retired amateur boxer, who became their trainer during this stage of their careers. They initially took up the sport as a hobby, but after six fights they began establishing a pattern of only spending a limited amount of time inactive during a month, visiting the gymnasium at least every two weeks. Since the early stages of their careers, the brothers decided to fight in different divisions, in order to avoid fighting against each other. However, they participated in sparring sessions, performing as they would do against other sparring partners.

== Amateur career ==
Arroyo began competing in the 70 pounds division, while his brother did so in the 75 pounds. He participated in the first Pan-American Cadet Championships, representing Puerto Rico in the event held in Mexico. In this competition, Arroyo won his first medal in an international tournament, earning the silver medal. Subsequently, he performed in the International Junior Olympics held in Michigan, where he won his division's gold medal. Arroyo entered the V José "Cheo" Aponte Tournament held from June 1–7, 2003. He advanced to the finals, losing a close decision to Joseph Serrano (13:14) to win the silver medal. Arroyo also represented Puerto Rico in the Copa La Romana, organized in La Romana Province, Dominican Republic, earning the event's silver medal. In 2003, he was named Puerto Rico's Youth Boxer of the Year. Arroyo entered the 2005 Torneo Batalla Carabobo where he won the event's silver medal. The VII José "Cheo" Aponte Tournament was held between June 2–7, 2005. In the semifinals, Arroyo defeated José Meza of Ecuador, 17:13. He won the gold medal, defeating Steven Ortíz by points (25:16) in the finals. Arroyo competed in the 2005 Pan American Championships, earning his division's silver medal.

=== Central American and Pan American titles ===
Both of the twins classified to the 2006 Central American and Caribbean Games. Arroyo debuted in the light flyweight semifinals, defeating Yan Bartelemí of Cuba, 14:11. After advancing to the finals, he earned the tournament's gold medal, winning his contest against Odilion Zaleta of Mexico by points (14:8). His brother won the bronze medal at the 112 lbs division. For this performance, Arroyo won Puerto Rico's Boxer of the Year recognition. The IX José "Cheo" Aponte Tournament was held between May–5, 2007. In the quarter-finals, Arroyo defeated Juan Carlos Payano of the Dominican Republic, 20:12. He won his semifinals against Alex Ferramosca of Italy (26:6). In the finals, Arroyo defeated Juan Vega of Ecuador by points, 30:14. Prior to the 2007 Pan American Games, both of the brothers moved up one division in order to avoid being matched against each other in local tournaments. Arroyo, now fighting at the flyweight division, debuted in the tournament's first date, defeating Lucas Navarro of Argentina by AB in the second round. He won his bracket's quarterfinal against William Urina of Colombia, 16:7. In the semifinals, Arroyo defeated Yoandri Salinas by RSCH in the second round. He gained the tournament's gold medal, winning by 12:11 against Juan Carlos Payano. Both of the brothers participated in the 2007 World Amateur Boxing Championships. Arroyo debuted in the tournament’s third date, defeating Luvsantseren Zorigtbaatar of Mongolia by points, 26:10. He won his second preliminary contest against Vitali Volkov of Ukraine (23:14). Arroyo closed his participation in this round by defeating Bato-Munko Vankeev of Belarus, 23:17. In the quarter-finals, he lost to Samir Mammadov (33:21). McJoe Arroyo advanced, winning the tournament's bantamweight bronze medal.

=== Surgery and Olympics ===
The Arroyo twins, McWilliams and McJoe, qualified to the 2008 Summer Olympics due to their performance at the AIBA World Championships. It was the second instance of twins competing in an Olympic boxing tournament, the first pair being Valeriy and Wladimir Sidorenko, who participated together in the 2000 Summer Olympics. On July 2, 2008, Arroyo was selected to carry Puerto Rico's flag in the opening ceremonies of the Olympics. On July 8, 2008, Puerto Rico's Sports and Recreation Department offered up to $48,000 to the five boxers classified to the Olympics, if the boxers choose to continue with the team for a second Olympic cycle. In respect, Arroyo expressed that he would make his decision after comparing the offers provided by the government and professional promoters. The twins, José Pedraza and Jonathan González began their preparations in a massive sports complex located in Salinas, Puerto Rico, named Albergue Olímpico. During the training, Arroyo suffered an injury in one of his legs. Consequently, his right foot underwent surgery and two screws were fasted to his bone, interrupting his training regime. As part of their training the boxing team moved to South Korea, in order to get used to the time changes. Arroyo joined them and officially received the flag of Puerto Rico that was going to be used in the Olympic games on July 9, 2008. After training and participating in a series of exhibition matches, the team traveled from South Korea to Beijing. Despite the surgery, Arroyo decided to compete in the Summer Olympics along his brother. He received a bye in the first round of the preliminaries. Arroyo debuted in the final stage of the preliminaries, defeating Norbert Kalucza of Hungary, 14:6. In the quarterfinals, he lost to Andry Laffita (11:2). Arroyo subsequently continued the rehabilitation process and the following month, his first son was born, receiving his namesake, McWilliams Arroyo Junior.

=== Final stages and World Championship ===
His next competition was the Torneo Nacional de Boxeo Aficionado Isaac Barrientos, Puerto Rico's national championship tournament. In the finals, he was matched against AIBA Youth World Champion, Jonathan González. Early in the contest, González was able to use his speed and counterattack to establish control of the fight's tempo, winning the first round 3:0. This pattern continued in the next stanza, where he was able to score six more points, including three in only eighteen seconds, before his opponent scored his first point. Arroyo attempted to pressure the fight on the third, reducing the difference to 9:4, before González had one final advance, securing the final score of 11:5. Arroyo returned to action at the XII José "Cheo" Aponte Tournament, which began on May 19, 2009. Prior to the competition, the local media emphasized the rematch between him and Gonzalez, labeling them as "nemesis". After advancing to the finals, he was matched against González, who won the second bracket. On this fight, Arroyo was able to win by points, gathering rounds of 6:3, 12:6 and 17:9. The fight was described as "frenetic" and saw a change in strategy by González, who attempted to pressure the offensive.

Immediately afterwards, both pugilists competed in a third contest as part of the first Juan Evangelista Venegas Olympic Cup. This event was organized by the Olympic Committee of Puerto Rico (COPUR), serving as the final qualifier to determine who would enter Puerto Rico’s national team in preparation for the 2009 World Amateur Boxing Championships. The first two rounds concluded with a close score of 5:4, which favored Arroyo. In the third round, González connected a right hook and scored a knockdown. Arroyo stood up while still affected by the punch and was forced to receive a protective count following another offensive barrage. With the score favoring him by two points 7:5, González scored three more times, while Arroyo was only able to do so once, securing a final score of 10:6. Subsequently, the Federación de Boxeo Aficionado de Puerto Rico (lit. "Amateur Boxing Federation of Puerto Rico") selected Arroyo to participate in the World Amateur Boxing Championships over González. Both of the brothers participated in this international event. Arroyo debuted in the tournament's third date, defeating Yoon Kyoung Min of Korea by RSCH in the second round. To close the preliminaries, he won his contest against Norbert Kalucza of Hungary by RSC in the third round. In the quarterfinals, Arroyo defeated Yampier Hernández by points, 6:2. He advanced to the finals by winning his fight against Ronny Beblik of Germany (9:7). Arroyo won the tournament's flyweight gold medal, defeating Tugstsogt Nyambayar of Mongolia with a score of 18:2, the widest margin in all of the finals.

== Professional career ==
On December 8, 2009, the Arroyo brothers issued a press release through their mother, Milagros Acevedo, informing that they were no longer interested in continuing their amateur careers. In the letter, they report differences with the criteria used to provide economical support to high-performance athletes, as well as schedule conflicts with their original plans to pursue a professional career after the 2010 Central American and Caribbean Games. These concerns were restated in a subsequent press conference, where they noted that supporting their respective families was the main reason to pursue a professional career. On January 12, 2010, PR Best Boxing announced the official signing of both brothers. Arroyo's debut was scheduled for February 27, 2010, taking part of a card titled "Haciendo Historia", where Wilfredo Vázquez, Jr. fought Marvin Sonsona for the super bantamweight world championship. His opponent, Eliecer Sánchez, also debuted as a professional in this card. The fight concluded after 1:46 of the first round had passed, when Arroyo connected a single punch that left Sánchez unconscious for several minutes, requiring paramedical help and an oxygen mask, this result earned him a victory by knockout. In his second fight, he was matched against the latest Dominican Republic Minimumweight Champion, Francisco Rosario. Arroyo won by technical knockout in the third round, when Rosario surrendered following an exchange of solid combinations. His next opponent was Samuel Gutiérrez, who was forced on the defensive from the opening round, receiving several combinations and suffering a broken nose. In the second, Arroyo continued on the offensive, scoring a knockdown which prompted the referee to stop the fight. In his next fight, he suffered an upset loss to Takashi Okada (1-0-1) who knocked Arroyo down in the second round en route to a unanimous decision victory.

Arroyo recovered with a six round unanimous decision win over Jiovany Fuentes. To open 2011, he scored a first round knockout over César Grajeda. Arroyo followed this with five round win over Erickson Martell. He closed the year with seven and two round technical knockouts against Rigoberto Casillas and Lorenzo Trejo. Arroyo won his next contest against Gilberto Mendoza, when the latter retired after suffering a shoulder injury. On March 10, 2012, he defeated Luis Maldonado to win the World Boxing Organization's Latino title. After repeating his previous performance in a rematch with Casillas, Arroyo defended the championship by knocking Ronald Ramos out in five rounds. On February 2, 2013, he won the World Boxing Council's Latino title with a four round win over Miguel Tamayo. However, Arroyo suffered an injury in his right hand and afterwards entered a prolonged inactivity. His return took place in an International Boxing Federation title eliminator on June 19, 2014, where he defeated Froilan Saludar by knockout in two rounds.

=== Arroyo vs. Cuadras ===
On February 24, 2018, Arroyo faced Carlos Cuadras. Cuadras was ranked #2 by the WBC and #6 by the WBO at super flyweight. Arroyo outpointed Cuadras on two of the scorecards, 98-92 and 97-93, while the third judge scored the fight a draw, 95-95, therefore awarding Arroyo with the majority decision victory.

=== Arroyo vs. Ioka ===
In his next fight, Arroyo fought former world champion Kazuto Ioka, who was ranked #2 by the WBA at super flyweight. Ioka boxed very well as his game plan seemed to work perfectly against Arroyo. Arroyo made it tough for Ioka at times, but Ioka was the clear winner of the fight, as all three judges scored the fight widely in his favor, 99-90 and 97-92 twice.

=== Arroyo vs. Rodriguez ===
On February 27, 2021, Arroyo fought Abraham Rodriguez for the vacant WBC interim flyweight title. Initially Arroyo was supposed to face Julio Cesar Martinez, who pulled out of the fight just days before because of hand injuries. Arroyo dominated his new opponent en route to a fifth round TKO win.

== Professional boxing record ==
26 fights	21 wins	4 losses
By knockout	16	0
By decision	5	4
No contests	1	

No.	Result	Record	Opponent	Type	Round, time	Date	Location	Notes
26	NC	21–4 (1)	Julio Cesar Martínez	NC	3 (12), 0:01	November 19, 2021	SNHU Arena, Manchester, New Hampshire, U.S.	For WBC flyweight title; Arroyo unable to continue after accidental head clash
25	Win	21–4	Abraham Rodriguez	TKO	5 (12), 1:41	Feb 27, 2021	Hard Rock Stadium, Miami Gardens, Florida, U.S.	Won vacant WBC interim flyweight title
24	Win	20–4	Juan Gabriel Medina	RTD	5 (10), 3:00	December 7, 2019	Coliseo Pedrin Zorrilla, San Juan, Puerto Rico	
23	Win	19–4	Carlos Buitrago	UD	10	June 15, 2019	Coliseo Roger L. Mendoza, Caguas, Puerto Rico	Retained WBO Latino flyweight title
22	Win	18–4	Carlos Maldonado	UD	10	February 16, 2019	Complejo Ferial, Ponce, Puerto Rico	Won vacant WBO Latino flyweight title
21	Loss	17–4	Kazuto Ioka	UD	10	Sep 8, 2018	The Forum, Inglewood, California, U.S.	Lost WBC Silver super flyweight title
20	Win	17–3	Carlos Cuadras	MD	10	Feb 24, 2018	The Forum, Inglewood, California, U.S.	Won vacant WBC Silver super flyweight title
19	Loss	16–3	Román González	UD	12	April 23, 2016	The Forum, Inglewood, California, U.S.	For WBC and The Ring flyweight titles
18	Win	16–2	Victor Ruiz	TKO	3 (10), 1:32	April 11, 2015	Coliseo Jose Miguel Agrelot, San Juan, Puerto Rico	
17	Loss	15–2	Amnat Ruenroeng	SD	12	September 10, 2014	Liptapanlop Hall, Nakhon Ratchasima, Thailand	For IBF flyweight title
16	Win	15–1	Froilan Saludar	TKO	2 (12), 2:25	June 19, 2014	Coliseo Rubén Rodríguez, Bayamón, Puerto Rico	
15	Win	14–1	Jose Miguel Tamayo	TKO	4 (10), 0:45	February 2, 2013	Coliseo Rubén Rodríguez, Bayamón, Puerto Rico	Won WBC interim Latino flyweight title
14	Win	13–1	Ronald Ramos	TKO	5 (12), 2:28	September 27, 2012	Hotel San Juan, Isla Verde, Puerto Rico	
13	Win	12–1	Rigoberto Casillas	TKO	7 (10), 2:00	June 9, 2012	Palacio de los Deportes, Mayagüez, Puerto Rico	
12	Win	11–1	Luis Maldonado	UD	10	March 10, 2012	Roberto Clemente Coliseum, San Juan, Puerto Rico	
11	Win	10–1	Gilberto Mendoza	RTD	3 (6), 3:00	February 3, 2012	Coliseo Luis Aymat, San Sebastián, Puerto Rico	
10	Win	9–1	Lorenzo Trejo	TKO	2 (8), 1:11	July 1, 2011	Coliseo Tomas Dones, Fajardo, Puerto Rico	
9	Win	8–1	Rigoberto Casillas	TKO	7 (8), 1:52	May 6, 2011	Coliseo Pedrin Zorrilla, San Juan, Puerto Rico	
8	Win	7–1	Erickson Martell	TKO	5 (8), 1:53	April 1, 2011	Coliseo Rubén Rodríguez, Bayamón, Puerto Rico	
7	Win	6–1	Manuel Galaviz	TKO	1 (6), 2:59	February 5, 2011	Coliseo Rubén Rodríguez, Bayamón, Puerto Rico	
6	Win	5–1	Cesar Grajeda	TKO	1 (6), 2:55	November 6, 2010	MGM Grand Garden Arena, Paradise, Nevada, U.S.	
5	Win	4–1	Jovany Fuentes	UD	6	August 28, 2010	Coliseo Mario 'Quijote' Morales, Guaynabo, Puerto Rico	
4	Loss	3–1	Takashi Okada	UD	4	June 12, 2010	Madison Square Garden, New York City, New York, U.S.	
3	Win	3–0	Samuel Gutiérrez	TKO	2 (4), 1:36	May 29, 2010	Coliseo Rubén Rodríguez, Bayamón, Puerto Rico	
2	Win	2–0	Francisco Rosario	KO	3 (4), 2:01	April 17, 2010	Coliseo Tomás Dones, Fajardo, Puerto Rico	
1	Win	1–0	Eliecer Sánchez	KO	1 (4), 1:46	February 27, 2010	Coliseo Rubén Rodríguez, Bayamón, Puerto Rico	

Sporting positions
World boxing titles
Vacant Title last held by Pongsaklek Wonjongkam	WBC flyweight champion Interim title February 27, 2021 – October 11, 2023; Stripped	Vacant
