= Juan Francisco Estrada =

Mexican boxer (born 1990)

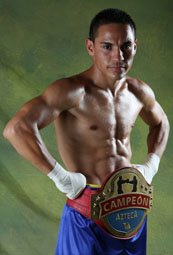
- Estrada in 2013

Personal information
- Nickname: El Gallo
- Born: Juan Francisco Estrada Romero; April 14, 1990 (age 36) Puerto Peñasco, Sonora, Mexico
- Height: 5 ft 4 in (163 cm)
- Weight: Light flyweight; Flyweight; Super flyweight

Boxing career
- Reach: 66 in (168 cm)
- Stance: Orthodox

Boxing record
- Total fights: 50
- Wins: 45
- Win by KO: 28
- Losses: 5

Juan Francisco Estrada Romero (born April 14, 1990) is a Mexican professional boxer. He is a two-weight world champion, having held the WBC super flyweight title between 2022 and 2024 and The Ring super flyweight title between 2019 and 2024. He previously held the WBA (Unified) and WBO flyweight titles between 2012 and 2015, and the WBC super flyweight title in March 2021 and the WBA (Super) title from March 2021 to August 2022.

== Early life ==
Estrada lost his parents at the age of 7. He was raised by his aunt, and picked up boxing when he was 9. At the age of 15, Estrada moved from his native Puerto Peñasco to Hermosillo to focus on his boxing career.

== Amateur career ==
As an amateur, Estrada compiled a 94–4 record.

== Professional career ==
=== Early career ===
Estrada made his professional debut on August 30, 2008, at the age of 18. Estrada won his first regional belt 2 years later, in October 2010. He defeated Manuel Almendariz by TKO for the WBC Mundo Hispano super flyweight belt. Estrada suffered his first loss against Juan Carlos Sánchez, Jr. in May 2011. Sánchez stands at 5 ft 8, giving him a significant size advantage over most flyweights. Estrada traded knockdowns with Sánchez but he lost the 8-round bout by unanimous decision.

==== Campeón Azteca ====
Later that year, Estrada participated in the boxing reality show Campeón Azteca: Round 3 that took place between September and December 2011 in Tuxtla Gutiérrez. The show featured 16 super flyweight fighters competing in an elimination tournament. Estrada won his first fight by unanimous decision (60–54, 60–54, 60–54) against fellow prospect Ivan Diaz. In his second fight in the tournament, Estrada stopped veteran Juan Carlos Tirado in the second round. Estrada won one more fight against Luis May to qualify to the competition's final.

In the competition's final bout, Estrada would face Sánchez Jr. once again. Estrada went down in the second round after a left straight from Sánchez. Later on, with both fighters trading punches in the final round, Sánchez was rocked by a left hook from Estrada. Estrada continued throwing combinations and eventually scored a knockdown over Sánchez. Sánchez attempted to get up but the referee waived the count, giving Estrada the win by TKO with 1:02 elapsed in the tenth and final round. Both Estrada and Sánchez would go on to become world champions.

==== Estrada vs. González ====
On November 17, 2012, Estrada moved down from his natural division to challenge WBA light flyweight champion Román González. This was Estrada's first fight outside his native Mexico. He lost a unanimous decision (112–116, 112–116, 110–118) to González, the future number one ranked pound-for-pound fighter. González would later say that he was interested in a rematch against Estrada after one of his successful flyweight world title defenses.

=== Unified flyweight champion ===
==== Estrada vs. Viloria ====
On April 6, 2013, Estrada once again challenged for a world title, fighting Brian Viloria at the Cotai Arena in Macau, China, for the WBA (Super) and WBO Flyweight titles. Viloria had unified his titles against Hernán Márquez on the same event in which Gónzalez defeated Estrada. Estrada appeared to lose the early rounds against Viloria, but he would surge on the latter rounds, landing combinations that gave him the edge. Estrada won by split decision (117–111, 116–111, 113–115), thus becoming the new unified champion. Although, observers of the fight felt that the victory should have been ruled a unanimous decision in favor of Estrada.

==== Various defenses ====
In his first defense, he defeated number one ranked challenger and future champion Milan Melindo by unanimous decision (118–109, 118–109, 117–109). Melindo was knocked down in round 11, as Estrada cruised to a shutout win. Estrada would fight three times in 2014, scoring victories over Richie Mepranum, former champion Giovani Segura, and Jobert Alvarez in a non-title fight. In 2015, he added two additional title defenses, against Rommel Asenjo and former champion Hernán Márquez. He then took a break from boxing to undergo surgery on his right hand. During Estrada's reign as a flyweight champion he became known for his refined technique and accurate punching.

=== Super flyweight ===
Following 3 1/2 years as unified flyweight champion and five titles defenses, Estrada vacated his titles in September 2016 to campaign in the super flyweight division. Estrada said that he could no longer make the flyweight 112 lbs limit. After spending a year away from the ring, Estrada came back against gatekeeper Raymond Tabugon in October 2016 in his native Puerto Peñasco. Estrada won an easy unanimous decision (100–90, 100–90, 100–90).

==== Estrada vs. Cuadras ====
In June 2017, it was revealed that Estrada would face Carlos Cuadras. Following Srisaket Sor Rungvisai's unanimous decision win over Román González, Cuadras was the mandatory challenger for Sor Rungvisai, the World Boxing Council's champion. However, the WBC ordered a rematch between Sor Rungvisai and González in light of the controversy around the González-Sor Rungvisai decision. Estrada himself was also a mandatory challenger to the WBO super flyweight champion Naoya Inoue, and Inoue was eager to face Estrada. But Estrada declined the fight and decided to go the WBC route. Cuadras then had to face Estrada, the next available ranked contender. The fight was scheduled for the Sor Rungvisai-González undercard on September 9, 2017, at Carson's StubHub Center.

On fight night, Cuadras seemed to gain the upper hand in the early rounds, switch-hitting and throwing and landing more punches. Nevertheless, Estrada was able to slowly impose his methodical style in the second half of the fight, even dropping Cuadras in round 11. Michael Buffer incorrectly announced "Carlos Estrada" as the winner of the fight, but after some confusion he corrected his mistake, giving Juan Francisco Estrada the win by unanimous decision (114–113, 114–113, 114–113).

==== Estrada vs Sor Rungvisai ====
In February 2018, Estrada who was ranked #1 by the WBC at super flyweight, challenged Srisaket Sor Rungvisai for the WBC and The Ring super flyweight titles. Estrada boxed well at times, and managed to connect multiple times on Rungvisai, who was able to take Estrada's best shots. Estrada too, was getting hit often by Rungvisai, but was able to take the champion's power. In the twelfth round, Estrada, perhaps sensing he is need of a knockout to win, fought aggressively. In the end, it was not enough, as Estrada fell short of winning his first world title at super flyweight, as two of the judges saw Rungvisai as the winner, scoring it 117-111 and 115–113, and one judge had the fight a draw, 114-114.

==== Estrada vs Orucuta ====
In his next fight, Estrada, ranked #1 by the WBC, fought #7 ranked Felipe Orucuta. Estrada came out with a unanimous decision victory, 118–110, 117-111 and 117–111 on the scorecards, however, the contest was tougher for Estrada than what was expected by fans and media alike.

==== Estrada vs Mendez ====
On December 8, 2018, Estrada stepped in on short notice and fought Victor Mendez at super bantamweight. The fight ended up being a good stay-busy fight for Estrada, as he dominated every second of the fight. After seven rounds, Mendez had had enough of it, and the fight was officially stopped.

==== Estrada vs Gonzalez II ====
On the 13th of March, 2021, Estrada faced WBA (Super) super flyweight champion, Román González in a highly anticipated rematch. This was the second time the pair had met. Their first fight in 2012 ended in a unanimous decision win for Gonzalez. Both fighters were throwing a lot of punches, with Compubox crediting both with 2529 thrown punches combined, making it the busiest fight at 115 pounds the company has ever tracked. In a very close and thrilling fight, Gonzalez seemed to have narrowly outlanded Estrada. However, Estrada earned the split-decision victory having two judges score the fight in his favor, 117-111 and 115–113, while the third judge had it 115-113 for Gonzalez.

==== Estrada vs Gonzalez III ====
Gonzalez was expected to face Juan Francisco Estrada in a trilogy bout in the main event of a DAZN broadcast card on 5 March 2022, at Pechanga Arena in San Diego, California. Estrada was forced to withdraw from the fight due to a positive COVID-19 test. On 3 September 2022, it was announced that Gonzalez would face Juan Francisco Estrada for the third time in his professional career on 3 December. The bout headlined a DAZN broadcast card, which took place at the Desert Diamond Arena in Glendale, Arizona. Gonzalez lost the fight by majority decision, with scores of 114–114. 115–113 and 116–112.

==== Estrada vs Rodriguez ====
On June 29, 2024, in Phoenix, AZ, Estrada defended his WBC and The Ring super flyweight titles against Jesse Rodriguez. He lost the fight by knockout in the seventh round.

==== Estrada vs Nasukawa ====
On April 11, 2026, Estrada fought Tenshin Nasukawa at the Ryōgoku Kokugikan in Tokyo, Japan. He lost by retirement at the end of round nine.

== Professional boxing record ==
50 fights	45 wins	5 losses
By knockout	28	2
By decision	17	3

No.	Result	Record	Opponent	Type	Round, time	Date	Location	Notes
50	Loss	45–5	Tenshin Nasukawa	RTD	9 (12), 3:00	Apr 11, 2026	Kokugikan, Tokyo, Japan	
49	Win	45–4	Karim Arce Lugo	UD	10	Jun 14, 2025	Hermosillo, Mexico	
48	Loss	44–4	Jesse Rodriguez	KO	7 (12), 3:00	Jun 29, 2024	Footprint Center, Phoenix, Arizona, U.S.	Lost WBC and The Ring super flyweight title
47	Win	44–3	Román González	MD	12	Dec 3, 2022	Desert Diamond Arena, Glendale, Arizona, U.S.	Retained The Ring super flyweight title; Won vacant WBC super flyweight title
46	Win	43–3	Argi Cortes	UD	12	Sep 3, 2022	Centro de Usos Multiples, Hermosillo, Mexico	Retained The Ring super flyweight title
45	Win	42–3	Román González	SD	12	Mar 13, 2021	American Airlines Center, Dallas, Texas, U.S.	Retained WBC and The Ring super flyweight titles; Won WBA (Super) super flyweight title
44	Win	41–3	Carlos Cuadras	TKO	11 (12), 2:22	Oct 23, 2020	Gimnasio TV Azteca, Mexico City, Mexico	Retained WBC and The Ring super flyweight titles
43	Win	40–3	Dewayne Beamon	TKO	9 (12), 0:51	Aug 24, 2019	Centro de Usos Multiples, Hermosillo, Mexico	Retained WBC and The Ring super flyweight titles
42	Win	39–3	Srisaket Sor Rungvisai	UD	12	Apr 26, 2019	The Forum, Inglewood, California, U.S.	Won WBC and The Ring super flyweight titles
41	Win	38–3	Victor Mendez	RTD	8 (10), 3:00	Dec 8, 2018	StubHub Center, Carson, California, U.S.	
40	Win	37–3	Felipe Orucuta	UD	12	Sep 8, 2018	The Forum, Inglewood, California, U.S.	
39	Loss	36–3	Srisaket Sor Rungvisai	MD	12	Feb 24, 2018	The Forum, Inglewood, California, U.S.	For WBC and inaugural The Ring super flyweight titles
38	Win	36–2	Carlos Cuadras	UD	12	Sep 9, 2017	StubHub Center, Carson, California, U.S.	
37	Win	35–2	Anuar Salas	TKO	5 (10), 2:05	Mar 11, 2017	Arena Ciudad de Mexico, Mexico City, Mexico	
36	Win	34–2	Raymond Tabugon	UD	10	Oct 8, 2016	Centro Convenciones, Puerto Peñasco, Mexico	
35	Win	33–2	Hernán Márquez	TKO	10 (12), 1:26	Sep 26, 2015	Centro Convenciones, Puerto Peñasco, Mexico	Retained WBA (Unified) and WBO flyweight titles
34	Win	32–2	Rommel Asenjo	TKO	3 (12), 0:43	Mar 28, 2015	Poliforum Zamna, Mérida, Mexico	Retained WBA (Unified) and WBO flyweight titles
33	Win	31–2	Joebert Alvarez	UD	10	Dec 6, 2014	Centro de Usos Multiples, Hermosillo, Mexico	
32	Win	30–2	Giovani Segura	TKO	11 (12), 1:33	Sep 6, 2014	Arena Ciudad de Mexico, Mexico City, Mexico	Retained WBA (Unified) and WBO flyweight titles
31	Win	29–2	Richie Mepranum	TKO	10 (12), 0:10	Apr 26, 2014	Centro Convenciones, Puerto Peñasco, Mexico	Retained WBA (Unified) and WBO flyweight titles
30	Win	28–2	Milan Melindo	UD	12	Jul 27, 2013	Cotai Arena, Venetian Resort, Macao	Retained WBA (Unified) and WBO flyweight titles
29	Win	27–2	Brian Viloria	SD	12	Apr 6, 2013	Cotai Arena, Venetian Resort, Macao	Won WBA (Unified) and WBO flyweight titles
28	Loss	26–2	Román González	UD	12	Nov 17, 2012	Sports Arena, Los Angeles, California, U.S.	For WBA light flyweight title
27	Win	26–1	German Meraz	TKO	9 (10), 0:38	Aug 24, 2012	Estadio Francisco León García, Puerto Peñasco, Mexico	
26	Win	25–1	Ardin Diale	KO	2 (10)	Jun 23, 2012	Centro de Usos Multiples, Hermosillo, Mexico	
25	Win	24–1	Jonathan Lecona Ramos	UD	8	Apr 14, 2012	Arena Ciudad de Mexico, Mexico City, Mexico	
24	Win	23–1	Juan Carlos Sánchez Jr.	TKO	10 (10), 1:02	Dec 17, 2011	Arena Jorge Cuesy Serrano, Tuxtla Gutiérrez, Mexico	
23	Win	22–1	Luis May	UD	8	Dec 8, 2011	Arena Jorge Cuesy Serrano, Tuxtla Gutiérrez, Mexico	
22	Win	21–1	Jose Alfredo Tirado	TKO	2 (6), 2:38	Nov 2, 2011	Arena Jorge Cuesy Serrano, Tuxtla Gutiérrez, Mexico	
21	Win	20–1	Ivan Diaz	UD	6	Sep 16, 2011	Arena Jorge Cuesy Serrano, Tuxtla Gutiérrez, Mexico	
20	Win	19–1	Manuel Lugo	TKO	3 (6), 1:18	Jul 2, 2011	Centro de Usos Multiples, Hermosillo, Mexico	
19	Loss	18–1	Juan Carlos Sánchez Jr.	UD	8	May 14, 2011	Polideportivo Centenario, Los Mochis, Mexico	
18	Win	18–0	Jorge Cardenas	KO	2 (10)	Feb 18, 2011	Gimnasio Salvador Mendoza, Navojoa, Mexico	
17	Win	17–0	Jose Guadalupe Martinez	UD	6	Dec 11, 2010	Auditorio Municipal, Torreón, Mexico	
16	Win	16–0	Manuel Armendariz	TKO	2 (10)	Oct 2, 2010	Hotel Puerto del Sol, Puerto Peñasco, Mexico	Won vacant WBC Mundo Hispano super flyweight title
15	Win	15–0	Carlos Rodriguez	TKO	2 (10), 2:52	Aug 7, 2010	Estadio Hector Espino, Hermosillo, Mexico	
14	Win	14–0	Francisco Soto	UD	10	May 14, 2010	Dubay Discoteque, Guasave, Mexico	
13	Win	13–0	Jose Tamayo	KO	3 (10)	Feb 20, 2010	Puerto Peñasco, Mexico	
12	Win	12–0	Marino Montiel	KO	1 (8), 2:08	Dec 12, 2009	Gimnasio Municipal, Guaymas, Mexico	
11	Win	11–0	Carlos Jacobo	KO	5 (6)	Oct 16, 2009	Malecon Turistico, Guaymas, Mexico	
10	Win	10–0	Felipe Acosta	TKO	3 (6), 0:36	Sep 4, 2009	Polideportivo Centenario, Los Mochis, Mexico	
9	Win	9–0	Javier Meraz	TKO	2 (6)	Jul 31, 2009	Malecon Turistico, Guaymas, Mexico	
8	Win	8–0	Eduardo Gutierrez	TKO	5 (6)	May 23, 2009	Estadio Jesus Ibarra, Huatabampo, Mexico	
7	Win	7–0	Carlos Lopez	KO	2 (6)	Apr 11, 2009	Penasco del Sol, Puerto Peñasco, Mexico	
6	Win	6–0	Jorge Ramirez	KO	6 (6)	Mar 29, 2009	Casino Costa Azul, Puerto Peñasco, Mexico	
5	Win	5–0	Roberto Hernandez	KO	1 (4)	Mar 6, 2009	Forum del Mayo, Navojoa, Mexico	
4	Win	4–0	Gregorio Cortez	TKO	4 (4)	Jan 31, 2009	Gimnasio Carlos Hernandez Carrera, Nogales, Mexico	
3	Win	3–0	Vicente Maroquin	RTD	2 (4), 3:00	Dec 13, 2008	Gimnasio Municipal, San Luis Río Colorado, Mexico	
2	Win	2–0	Daniel Contreras Jr	KO	1 (4)	Nov 14, 2008	Gimnasio German Evers, Mazatlán, Mexico	
1	Win	1–0	Sergio Chavez	UD	4	Aug 30, 2008	Expo Forum, Hermosillo, Mexico	

== Titles in boxing ==
=== Major world titles ===
- WBA (Unified) flyweight champion (Note: Primary champion throughout his entire reign.) (112 lbs)
- WBO flyweight champion (112 lbs)
- WBA (Super) super flyweight champion (115 lbs)
- WBC super flyweight champion (115 lbs) (2×)

=== The Ring magazine titles ===
- The Ring super flyweight champion (115 lbs)

=== Regional/International titles ===
- WBC Mundo Hispano super flyweight champion (115 lbs)

=== Honorary titles ===
- WBC Franchise super flyweight champion

== See also ==
- List of Mexican boxing world champions
- List of flyweight boxing champions
- List of super-flyweight boxing champions

== Notes and references ==
=== References ===
Sporting positions
World boxing titles
Preceded by Brian Viloria	WBA flyweight champion Super title April 6, 2013 – September 14, 2016; Vacated	Vacant Title next held by Artem Dalakian
Preceded by Brian Viloria	WBO flyweight champion April 6, 2013 – September 14, 2016; Vacated	Vacant Title next held by Zou Shiming
Preceded by Srisaket Sor Rungvisai	WBC super flyweight champion April 26, 2019 – March 26, 2021; Status changed to Franchise champion	Vacant Title next held by Jesse Rodríguez
Preceded by Srisaket Sor Rungvisai	The Ring super flyweight champion April 26, 2019 – June 29, 2024	Succeeded by Jesse Rodríguez
Preceded by Román González	WBA super flyweight champion Super title March 13, 2021 – August 11, 2022; Stripped	Vacant Title next held by Joshua Franco as World champion
Vacant Title last held by Jesse Rodríguez	WBC super flyweight champion December 3, 2022 – June 29, 2024	Succeeded by Jesse Rodríguez
