= Carlos Cuadras =

Mexican boxer (born 1988)

Personal information
- Nickname: El Príncipe (The Prince)
- Nationality: Mexican
- Born: Carlos Roberto Cuadras Quiroa; August 24, 1988 (age 38) Guamúchil, Sinaloa, Mexico
- Height: 5 ft 4 in (163 cm)
- Weight: Super flyweight; Bantamweight

Boxing career
- Reach: 66 in (168 cm)
- Stance: Orthodox

Boxing record
- Total fights: 51
- Wins: 44
- Win by KO: 28
- Losses: 6
- Draws: 1
Medal record
Men's amateur boxing
Representing Mexico
Pan American Games
Gold medal – first place	2007 Rio de Janeiro	Bantamweight

Carlos Roberto Cuadras Quiroa (born August 24, 1988) is a Mexican former professional boxer who held the WBC super flyweight title from 2014 to 2016. As an amateur he won a gold medal in the bantamweight division at the 2007 Pan American Games.

== Amateur career ==
Cuadras won the gold medal at the 2007 PanAmerican Games by beating local James Pereira and winning the final against Dominican southpaw Claudio Marrero 15–11.

At the 2007 World Amateur Boxing Championships he lost to Joe Murray: 19–28.

== Professional career ==
In February 2010, Cuadras knocked out Oswaldo Rodriguez to win the WBC Youth Intercontinental Super Flyweight Championship at the Poliforum Zamná in Mérida, Yucatán.

Cuadras is managed by his father Rosario Cuadras, and promoted by Japan's Teiken Promotions. He has trained with Jose Luis Bueno and others at Bueno's Gym or his own gym in Mexico, often training under Sendai Tanaka's instruction in Japan.

In September 2011, Cuadras competed for the vacant WBC Continental Americas Super Flyweight Title against Johnny García at the Foro Polanco in Mexico City. He was knocked down with García's left hook in the first round. However, after his barrage in the second round, he landed a left to the liver and a right to the jaw to floor García twice, and captured the title with the stoppage victory.

Cuadras went up a weight division and knocked out Javier Franco in the fifth round after flooring him to be crowned the WBC United States (USNBC) Bantamweight Champion at the Playa Mamitas in Playa del Carmen on June 16, 2012.

On November 13, 2014, Cuadras was scheduled to defend his title against Sonny Boy Jaro, but Jaro was replaced with Marvin Mabait due to having visa problems.

On September 10, 2016, Cuadras sustained his first defeat as a professional, when he lost the WBC world Super-Flyweight title to Roman Gonzalez by a 12-round decision in a fight broadcast in the United States by HBO Boxing.

On September 9, 2017, Cuadras lost to Juan Francisco Estrada in a very close and entertaining fight. While reading out the scorecards, legendary boxing announcer Michael Buffer, mistakenly announced Carlos Estrada as the winner, before correcting himself, and declaring Juan Francisco Estrada as the winner by unanimous decision, winning 114–113 on all three judges' scorecards.

In his next fight, Cuadras was upset by Puerto Rican McWilliams Arroyo.

On May 12, 2024, in Perth, Australia, Cuadras was scheduled to defend his interim WBC junior bantamweight title against Andrew Moloney. On March 27, 2024, it was announced that Cuadras withdrew due to injury.

Cuadras announced his retirement from professional boxing on November 24, 2025, after losing to Tomoya Tsuboi by eighth round stoppage at Toyota Arena Tokyo in Koto-Ku, Japan.

== Professional boxing record ==
50 fights	43 wins	6 losses
By knockout	28	2
By decision	15	4
Draws	1	

No.	Result	Record	Opponent	Type	Round, time	Date	Location	Notes
51	Loss	44–6–1	Tomoya Tsuboi	TKO	8 (10), 2:59	Nov 24, 2025	Toyota Arena Tokyo, Koto-Ku, Japan	
50	Win	44–5–1	Luis Guzman Torres	UD	10	May 15, 2025	Palenque de la Feria del Caballo, Texcoco, Mexico	
49	Win	43–5–1	Juan Ramírez Márquez	UD	8	Dec 6, 2024	Domo Deportivo Metropolitano, Ciudad Nezahualcoyotl, Mexico	
48	Win	42–5–1	Pedro Guevara	SD	12	Nov 17, 2023	Humo Arena, Tashkent, Uzbekistan	Won vacant WBC interim super flyweight title
47	Win	41–5–1	Juan Carlos Mireles	TKO	5 (8)	Aug 4, 2023	Arena Coliseo, Mexico City, Mexico	
46	Win	40–5–1	Lamberto Macias	UD	10	Feb 10, 2023	La Huerta, Mexico	
45	Loss	39–5–1	Jesse Rodríguez	UD	12	Feb 5, 2022	Footprint Center, Phoenix, Arizona, U.S.	For vacant WBC super flyweight title
44	Loss	39–4–1	Juan Francisco Estrada	TKO	11 (12), 2:22	Oct 23, 2020	Gimnasio TV Azteca, Mexico City, Mexico	For WBC and The Ring super flyweight titles
43	Win	39–3–1	Jose Maria Cardenas	MD	10	Sep 14, 2019	T-Mobile Arena, Paradise, Nevada, U.S.	
42	Win	38–3–1	Daniel Lozano	UD	8	May 25, 2019	Osceola Heritage Park, Kissimmee, Florida, U.S.	
41	Win	37–3–1	Ricardo Núñez	TD	7 (12), 3:00	Aug 18, 2018	Centro de Usos Multiples, Los Mochis, Mexico	Won vacant WBC International bantamweight title; Unanimous TD after Cuadras cut from accidental head clash
40	Loss	36–3–1	McWilliams Arroyo	MD	10	Feb 24, 2018	The Forum, Inglewood, California, U.S.	For vacant WBC Silver super flyweight title
39	Loss	36–2–1	Juan Francisco Estrada	UD	12	Sep 9, 2017	StubHub Center, Carson, California, U.S.	
38	Win	36–1–1	David Carmona	UD	10	Mar 18, 2017	Madison Square Garden, New York City, New York, U.S.	
37	Loss	35–1–1	Román González	UD	12	Sep 10, 2016	The Forum, Inglewood, California, U.S.	Lost WBC super flyweight title
36	Win	35–0–1	Richie Mepranum	RTD	8 (12), 3:00	Apr 23, 2016	Centro de Usos Multiples, Los Mochis, Mexico	Retained WBC super flyweight title
35	Win	34–0–1	Koki Eto	UD	12	Nov 28, 2015	Xebio Arena, Sendai, Japan	Retained WBC super flyweight title
34	Win	33–0–1	Dixon Flores	TKO	5 (12), 1:11	Aug 15, 2015	Estadio de Beisbol Alberto Vega Chavez, Guamuchil, Mexico	Retained WBC super flyweight title
33	Win	32–0–1	Luis Concepción	UD	12	Apr 4, 2015	Unidad Deportiva Martín Alarcón, Metepec, Mexico	Retained WBC super flyweight title
32	Win	31–0–1	Marvin Mabait	TKO	6 (12), 0:36	Nov 13, 2014	Washington Hilton, Washington, D.C., U.S.	Retained WBC super flyweight title
31	Draw	30–0–1	José Salgado	TD	4 (12), 2:28	Sep 20, 2014	Estadio de Beisbol, Guamuchil, Mexico	Retained WBC super flyweight title; Draw after Salgado cut from accidental head clash
30	Win	30–0	Srisaket Sor Rungvisai	TD	8 (12), 0:29	May 31, 2014	Sala de Armas Agustín Melgar, Iztacalco, Mexico	Won WBC super flyweight title; Unanimous TD after Cuadras cut from accidental head clash
29	Win	29–0	Nathawut Keawkanya	TKO	2 (6), 2:22	Dec 31, 2013	Ota City General Gymnasium, Tokyo, Japan	
28	Win	28–0	Victor Zaleta	TKO	7 (12), 2:33	Mar 2, 2013	Gimnasio de las Liebres, Rio Bravo, Mexico	Retained WBC Silver super flyweight title
27	Win	27–0	Fernando Lumacad	UD	12	Nov 24, 2012	Foro Polanco, Mexico City, Mexico	Retained WBC Silver super flyweight title
26	Win	26–0	Ronald Ortega Barrera	TKO	7 (12)	Sep 29, 2012	Estadio Héctor Espino, Hermosillo, Mexico	Won vacant WBC Silver super flyweight title
25	Win	25–0	Javier Franco	KO	5 (12), 1:59	Jun 16, 2012	Playa Mamita's, Playa del Carmen, Mexico	
24	Win	24–0	Humberto Morales	UD	10	Mar 31, 2012	Oasis Hotel Complex, Cancun, Mexico	
23	Win	23–0	Alberto Chuc	TKO	6 (10), 1:52	Dec 17, 2011	Campo de Beisbol Froilan Lopez, Cozumel, Mexico	
22	Win	22–0	Johnny Garcia	TKO	2 (12), 1:57	Sep 24, 2011	Foro Polanco, Mexico City, Mexico	Won vacant WBC Continental Americas super flyweight title
21	Win	21–0	Armando Santos	UD	10	Jun 17, 2011	Salón Amapola, Mexico City, Mexico	
20	Win	20–0	Pissanu Tepjang	TKO	2 (6), 2:42	Apr 8, 2011	World Memorial Hall, Kobe, Japan	
19	Win	19–0	Sakchai Sor Tanapinyo	KO	1 (8), 1:45	Nov 26, 2010	Nippon Gaishi Hall, Nagoya, Japan	
18	Win	18–0	Jose Barrero	TKO	5 (10), 1:55	Aug 6, 2010	Gimnasio Sport City, Cancun, Mexico	
17	Win	17–0	Nahum Ceron	KO	1 (8)	Jun 5, 2010	El Palenque de la Feria, Pachuca, Mexico	
16	Win	16–0	Alberto Chuc	UD	8	Mar 20, 2010	The City Discotheque, Cancun, Mexico	
15	Win	15–0	Oswaldo Rodriguez	TKO	5 (10), 2:12	Feb 20, 2010	Poliforum Zamna, Merida, Mexico	Won vacant WBC Youth Intercontinental super flyweight title
14	Win	14–0	Paulino Villalobos	UD	8	Dec 19, 2009	Palenque de Gallos, Tuxtla Gutierrez, Mexico	
13	Win	13–0	Miguel Tique	KO	2 (8), 1:46	Nov 20, 2009	Discotheque Basic, Cancun, Mexico	
12	Win	12–0	Humberto Morales	KO	2 (6)	Oct 24, 2009	World Trade Center, Boca del Rio, Mexico	
11	Win	11–0	Jose Luis Amado	KO	1 (8)	Sep 26, 2009	Deportivo Trabajadores del Metro, Mexico City, Mexico	
10	Win	10–0	Josimar Olivares	TKO	6 (6), 0:27	Aug 23, 2009	Salon 21, Mexico City, Mexico	
9	Win	9–0	Jesus Ceja	KO	1 (6), 1:31	Jun 27, 2009	Arena Texcoco Lecheria, Texcoco, Mexico	
8	Win	8–0	Arturo Camargo	TKO	1 (6), 2:55	Apr 4, 2009	Ciudad Victoria, Mexico	
7	Win	7–0	Seksith Por Thitima	KO	1 (6), 1:50	Mar 12, 2009	Korakuen Hall, Tokyo, Japan	
6	Win	6–0	Rodolfo Garay	KO	2 (6), 1:16	Dec 20, 2008	Parque Revolucion, Culiacan, Mexico	
5	Win	5–0	Yasuyuki Matayoshi	TKO	2 (6), 2:48	Oct 16, 2008	Yoyogi First Gym, Tokyo, Japan	
4	Win	4–0	Nahum Ceron	RTD	4 (4), 0:10	Aug 30, 2008	Poliforum, Playa del Carmen, Mexico	
3	Win	3–0	Ambrosio Martinez	KO	1 (4), 0:26	Jul 16, 2008	Foro Scotiabank, Mexico City, Mexico	
2	Win	2–0	David Ramirez	KO	1 (4)	Jun 14, 2008	Palacio de los Deportes, Mexico City, Mexico	
1	Win	1–0	Marco Turriza	TKO	1 (4)	May 31, 2008	Centro Internacional de Convenciones, Chetumal, Mexico	

== See also ==
- List of Mexican boxing world champions
- List of world super-flyweight boxing champions

Sporting positions
World boxing titles
Preceded by Srisaket Sor Rungvisai	WBC super flyweight champion May 31, 2014 – September 10, 2016	Succeeded by Román González
Vacant Title last held by Tomás Rojas	WBC super flyweight champion Interim title November 17, 2023 – March 28, 2024; Stripped	Vacant Title next held by Pedro Guevara
