= Daniel Rosas =

Mexican boxer

Personal information
- Nickname: Bad Boy
- Born: Francisco Daniel Rosas Reyes; September 18, 1989 (age 36) Mexico City, Mexico
- Height: 5 ft 7 in (170 cm)
- Weight: Super flyweight; Bantamweight

Boxing career
- Reach: 65 in (165 cm)
- Stance: Orthodox

Boxing record
- Total fights: 29
- Wins: 22
- Win by KO: 14
- Losses: 6
- Draws: 1

Daniel Rosas Reyes (born September 18, 1989) is a Mexican professional boxer.

== Pro career ==
In February 2010, Rosas beat the undefeated Juan Carlos Sánchez Jr. by T.K.O. The bout was the main-event of a boxing card at the Complejo Panamericano in Guadalajara, Jalisco, Mexico.

In July 2021 he would lose via knockout to up & coming prospect Lamont Roach Jr.

In October 2022 he would lose via knockout to up & coming prospect Floyd Schofield.

== Professional boxing record ==
29 fights	22 wins	6 losses
By knockout	14	5
By decision	8	1
By disqualification	0	0
Draws	1	

No.	Result	Record	Opponent	Type	Round, time	Date	Location	Notes
29	Loss	22–6–1	Floyd Schofield	KO	1 (8)	2022-10-20	Fantasy Springs Resort Casino, Indio, California, U.S.	
28	Loss	22–5–1	Lamont Roach Jr.	KO	2 (10)	2021-07-09	Banc of California Stadium, Los Angeles, California, U.S.	
27	Win	22–4–1	Enoc Perez	TKO	3 (6)	2021-05-22	Salon de Usos Multiples Corona, La Paz, Mexico	
26	Win	21–4–1	Luis Alberto Romero Hernandez	TKO	? (6)	2018-12-07	Salón Zapata Vela, Iztacalco, Mexico	
25	Loss	20–4–1	Willmank Canonico Brito	TKO	3 (?)	2017-03-25	Gimnasio Municipal, Palenque, Mexico	
24	Loss	20–3–1	Yonatan Guzman Pena	RTD	8 (12)	2016-04-29	Trump Taj Mahal, Atlantic City, New Jersey, U.S.	
23	Win	20–2–1	Roberto Pucheta	SD	10 (10)	2015-11-14	Deportivo Tlalli, Tlalnepantla, Mexico	
22	Win	19–2–1	Jhon Gemino	KO	8 (10)	2015-09-05	Gran Teatro Moliere, Polanco, Mexico	
21	Win	18–2–1	Mario Villela	MD	8 (8)	2014-12-06	Centro de Usos Multiples, Hermosillo, Mexico	
20	Loss	17–2–1	Alejandro Hernández	UD	12 (12)	2014-06-14	Arena Jorge Cuesy Serrano, Tuxtla Gutiérrez, Mexico	For interim WBO bantamweight title
19	Loss	17–1–1	Rodrigo Guerrero	TKO	7 (10)	2014-02-15	Palenque de la Feria Mesoamericana, Tapachula, Mexico	
18	Win	17–0–1	Juan Alberto Rosas	UD	10 (10)	2013-10-26	Caliente Hipódromo, Tijuana, Mexico	
17	Win	16–0–1	Roberto Castaneda	KO	2 (10)	2013-08-10	Caliente Hipódromo, Tijuana, Mexico	
16	Win	15–0–1	Eduardo Garcia	TKO	3 (10)	2012-11-24	Caliente Hipódromo, Tijuana, Mexico	
15	Win	14–0–1	Enrique Bernache	UD	10 (10)	2012-06-02	El Foro, Tijuana, Mexico	
14	Win	13–0–1	Fernando Vargas Parra	SD	8 (8)	2012-02-11	Arena Union, Los Mochis, Mexico	
13	Draw	12–0–1	José Cabrera	SD	12 (12)	2011-10-15	Estadio Centenario, Los Mochis, Mexico	For interim WBO super-flyweight title
12	Win	12–0	Federico Catubay	TKO	6 (10)	2011-07-02	Centro de Usos Multiples, Hermosillo, Mexico	Retained WBO Youth Super-flyweight title
11	Win	11–0	David Gaspar	TKO	8 (10)	2011-05-14	Polideportivo Centenario, Los Mochis, Mexico	Won vacant WBO Youth Super-flyweight title
10	Win	10–0	Felipe Orucuta	UD	10 (10)	2010-12-16	Mexico	
9	Win	9–0	Mario Antonio Macias	UD	8 (8)	2010-11-17	Feria de Xmatkuil, Mérida, Mexico	
8	Win	8–0	Luis Valdez	KO	1 (6)	2010-09-06	Restaurante Arroyo, Mexico City, Mexico	
7	Win	7–0	Gabriel Aguillon	TKO	1 (4)	2010-06-19	Plaza de Toros, San Juan del Rio, Mexico	
6	Win	6–0	Juan Carlos Sánchez Jr.	TKO	2 (12)	2010-02-06	Complejo Panamericano, Guadalajara, Mexico	
5	Win	5–0	Carlos Jimenez	KO	1 (8)	2009-08-23	Salon 21, Mexico City, Mexico	
4	Win	4–0	Juan Bernal	KO	1 (6)	2009-06-17	Foro Scotiabank, Polanco, Mexico	
3	Win	3–0	Carlos Mendoza Diaz	KO	1 (6)	2009-01-31	Telmex Auditorium, Zapopan, Mexico	
2	Win	2–0	Jorge Juarez	KO	1 (?)	2008-02-08	Salon Emperador, Iztacalco, Mexico	
1	Win	1–0	David Ramirez	PTS	4 (4)	2007-11-16	Salon Emperador, Iztacalco, Mexico	

Sporting positions
Regional boxing titles
Vacant Title last held by Jing Xiang	WBO Youth super-flyweight champion May 14, 2011 – 2012; Vacated	Vacant Title next held by David Carmona
