= Jing Xiang =

Jing Xiang or Xiang Jing may refer to:

- Jing Xiang (politician) (Chinese: 敬翔; pinyin: Jìng Xiáng; died 923), Chinese politician
- Xiang Jing (artist) (Chinese: 向京; pinyin: Xiàng Jīng; born 1968), Chinese artist
- Jing Xiang (boxer) (Chinese: 向静; pinyin: Xiàng Jìng; born 1989), Chinese boxer
- Jing Xiang (actress) (Chinese: 项晶; pinyin: Xiàng Jīng; born 1993), Chinese German actress
