= Dennis McCann =

Dennis McCann may refer to:

- Dennis McCann (theologian) (fl. 1970s–2020s), American theologian and academic
- Dennis McCann (boxer) (born 2001), Irish-British boxer
