= Boxing at the 2010 Commonwealth Games – Bantamweight =

Boxing competitions

The Bantamweight class is an even on the Boxing at the 2010 Commonwealth Games competition. Bantamweights were limited to those boxers weighing under 56 kilograms (123 lb), 21 boxers competed.

Like all Olympic boxing events, the competition was a straight single-elimination tournament. Both semifinal losers were awarded bronze medals, so no boxers competed again after their first loss. Bouts consisted of three rounds of three minutes each, with one-minute breaks between rounds. Punches scored only if the front of the glove made full contact with the front of the head or torso of the opponent. Five judges scored each bout; three of the judges had to signal a scoring punch within one second for the punch to score. The winner of the bout was the boxer who scored the most valid punches by the end of the bout.

On 8 May 2011 Manju Wanniarachchi was provisionally disqualified by the Commonwealth Games Federation after testing positive for Norandrosterone during the Games. He had 21 days to appeal the decision but on 26 May announced that he did not wish to file an appeal and retired from the sport. On 6 June 2011 the Commonwealth Games Federation announced Sean McGoldrick of Wales as the new gold medallist. Tirafalo Seoko of Botswana was upgraded from bronze to silver on the basis that he had lost to Wanniarachchi in the semi-finals. Nicholas Okoth of Kenya joins Louis Julie from Mauritius as a bronze medal winner.

== Medalists ==
Gold	Sean McGoldrick; Wales
Silver	Tirafalo Seoko; Botswana
Bronze	Nicholas Okoth; Kenya
Bronze	Louis Julie; Mauritius

== Tournament ==
Round of 32
Ibrahim Balla (AUS)	5
Thabiso Nketu (LES)	2
Akhil Kumar (IND)	7
Qadir Khan (PAK)	0
Iain Weaver (ENG)	RSCH
Vusie Simelane (SWZ)
Louis Julie (MRI)	9
Taiwo Agbaje (NGR)	4
Papish Baloyi (RSA)
Revocatus Shomari (TAN)	2

Round of 16
Tirafalo Seoko (BOT)	10
Ali Muhammad (MAS)	8
Joe Ham (SCO)	11
Sakaria Lukas (NAM)	14
Andrique Allisop (SEY)	2
Manju Wanniarachchi (SRI)	23
Benedict Telovae (SOL)
Nicholas Okoth (KEN)	RSC
Sean McGoldrick (WAL)	5
Jessie Lartey (GHA)	2
Tyrone McCullagh (NIR)	7
Ibrahim Balla (AUS)	2
Akhil Kumar (IND)	11
Iain Weaver (ENG)	6
Louis Julie (MRI)	12
Revocatus Shomari (TAN)	1

Quarterfinals
Tirafalo Seoko (BOT)	13
Sakaria Lukas (NAM)	11
Manju Wanniarachchi (SRI)	10
Nicholas Okoth (KEN)	1
Sean McGoldrick (WAL)	4
Tyrone McCullagh (NIR)	3
Akhil Kumar (IND)	5
Louis Julie (MRI)	7

Semifinals
Tirafalo Seoko (BOT)
Manju Wanniarachchi (SRI)	RSC
Sean McGoldrick (WAL)	2
Louis Julie (MRI)	1

Final
Manju Wanniarachchi (SRI)	+7
Sean McGoldrick (WAL)	7
