= Portrayal of female bodies in Chinese contemporary art =

Portrayal of female bodies in Chinese contemporary art has become a lot more diverse as women artists start to rise in China. Many contemporary Chinese women artists have employed the use of female bodies as the subject of their artworks. From the ancient and imperial period of China until early the 19th century, women's body images in Chinese art were predominantly portrayed through male artists' lenses. As a result, female bodies were often misrepresented. With the arrival of modernism in Chinese contemporary art, women now have more influences in the field of visual arts. Chinese women artists employ unconventional artistic expressions in order to speak about their experiences of being a female and an artist in a patriarchal society. Although the Chinese visual art field has been more inclusive in the recent decades, women artists’ representation in major art exhibitions is still significantly less than male artists. Therefore, artists and curators have made a joint effort to devote certain art exhibitions to just Chinese women artists.

== Historical context ==
=== Ancient and Imperial periods ===
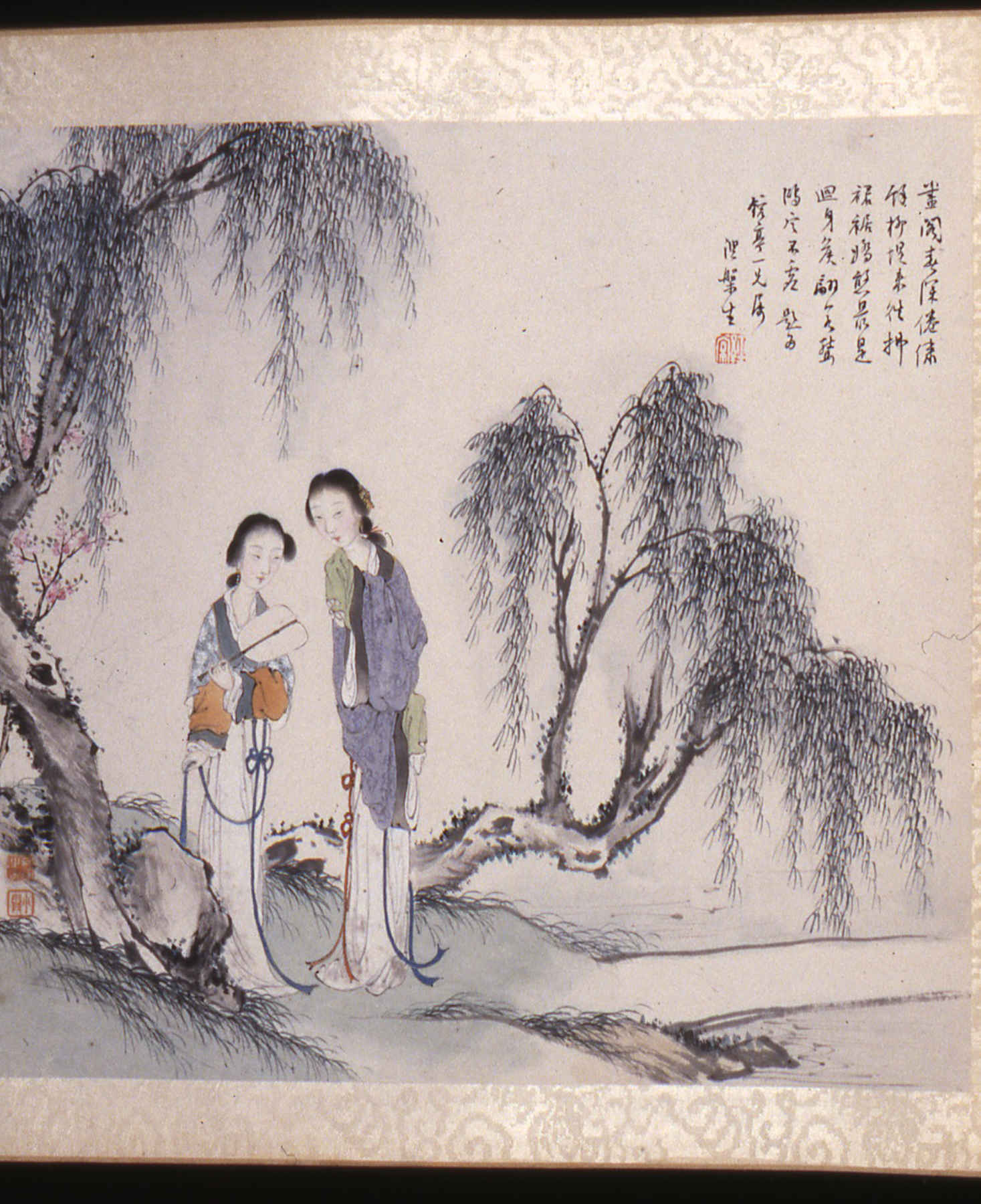

Traditionally, female bodies were only valued as carriers for the family bloodline. In traditional paintings, nude women were a taboo for the artists. As a result, the portrayal of women's bodies was formulaic, always with slim figures, usually leaning on another object or have a slightly bent posture to further emphasize their delicate bodies.

Female images would also demonstrate ideal qualities of women at that time. Aside from feminine beauty and charm, she should also possess the virtues of subordinating herself in a Confucian patriarchal society. Therefore, women in these ancient paintings all wore long silk skirts that came down to the ankles. They could only show the part of their body above their chest. Their appearance, combined with their slender body figures, showed the submissive and demure qualities, which was desirable for male audiences.

=== 1970s–1980s ===
A drastic change in ideal femininity occurred in 1966 and 1967 when the Cultural Revolution in China took place. The Cultural Revolution, led by Mao Zedong, denounced the traditional image of women's inferiority and calls for a women's liberation in the new China. Propaganda tools, such as performance art, films, and posters, strongly supported this movement and effectively constructed and broadcast a new female identity. Feminine beauty was no longer characterized by delicate figures, but instead by masculinized images of women. For example, "Iron girls" represented the permissible appearances of women in the 1970s. They should not wear anything that showed their female curves. Moreover, women were encouraged to dress like men and go to work like men did, given that Mao called for a "gender erasure" in order to make "Chinese women in new China."

Similar to "Iron Girls," "Strong Women" images were popularized through mass media, such as cartoons and local newspapers. Their appearance was defined by masculinized traits: tanned skin tone, sturdy figures, and blue and black work uniforms. Feminine features, like smooth skin and hands, were seen as something to be ashamed of because they were expected to be contributing to the nation's economy like men did.

== Contemporary portrayal of women bodies ==
=== Installation ===
==== "Trauma" ====
In her installation series, "Trauma", Hung Liu portrays a bound-foot woman. Foot binding was practiced among Chinese women from the Song dynasty up until the early 20th century. Women would wrap their feet tightly in order to keep them small, which was characterized as a feminine beauty at the time. In Liu's installation pieces, she repeatedly shows an emotionless woman with her naked feet. As a result of the foot binding cultural, these women had deformed feet.

=== Paintings ===
==== Feng Jiali's oil paintings ====
Feng Jiali is famous for her oil painting of explicit images of female bodies. A series of her paintings depict young, school-aged Chinese girls, usually skimpily dressed in the bath or lying in bed. The girls in her paintings almost always look directly at the viewers, some innocent-looking, some with a confrontational gaze.

Another series of her works involves photographs of her pregnant body. By revealing her own pregnant body fearlessly in front of the camera, she challenges the traditional views of pregnant body as something private and a mean to continue the family line, favoring boys over girls, and following the one-child policy. Because pregnant nude is normally not defined as the ideal beauty found in female bodies, Feng’s photo collage expresses another aspect of being a woman. She desired to express the hardships and anxieties of being pregnant, which contradicts with the conventional, sacred portrayal of childbirth by many male artists.

==== "Banana Leaves Series" ====
Cai Jin, another contemporary oil painter, also challenges the traditional taboos of nudity in ancient Chinese art history. Unlike Feng Jiali, however, Cai articulates female bodies in a semi-abstract way by using organic elements in her paintings. A series of her paintings depict women's bodies shaped like banana tree leaves. Unlike many conventional portrayals of the female body that serves in the interest of male audiences, Cai painted the bodies like decomposed flesh, which is then metamorphosed into dripping, red, banana leaves.

Traditionally, plants, especially flowers, are associated with femininity. However, Cai made a modern twist on this subject and made it into a somewhat unpleasant-looking and distorted image, rejecting the stereotypical delicate women and flowers association. Like how Feng declared that pregnant bodies can be art too, Cai had made an assertion that although women's bodies aren't always going to be maintained in a perfect way, they can still become a form of art.

=== Performance arts ===
==== "Opening of the Great Wall" ====
In Opening of the Great Wall, He Chengyao presented her own naked body in a public space in 2001 and took a series of photographs of herself. The photographs documented her walking confidently with her upper body being nude. She held her bright red bra on her right hand and tied her sweater around the waist. She had a deadpan expression on her face and a confident posture as she walks toward the camera. The photo was taken on the Great Wall of China, which is one of the most popular scenic spots in Beijing, China.

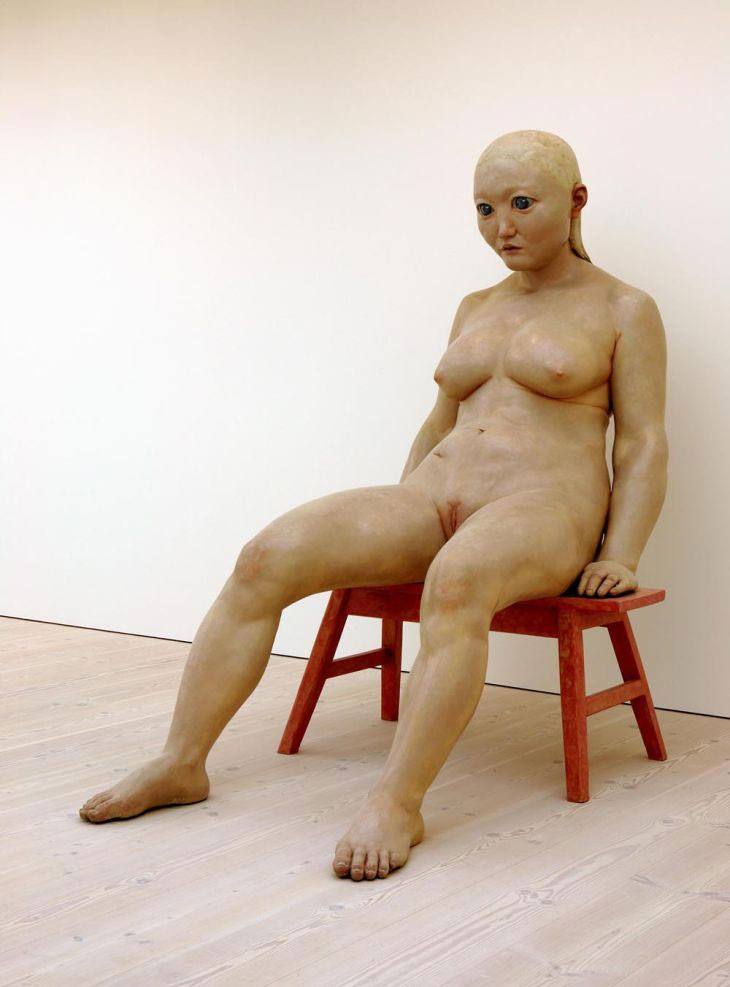
Your Body (2005, fiberglass & paint, 270×160×150cm) at The Saatchi Gallery, The Revolution Continues: New Art from China, 2008

Despite the fact that she was surrounded by many curious tourists, He still maintained a confident look. She had also spontaneously joined in an installation by a male artist, H.A. Schult, which was exhibited on the Great Wall at the same time. Whether intended or not, she had made her appearance as a Chinese women artist in the mainstream of male art production. Furthermore, although her piece took place in 2001, women's nudity in public spaces was still considered taboo at the time.

==== "Broadcast Exercise" ====
He Chengyao completed this performance art piece in 2004 at the Shanghai Doland Museum of Modern Art, which combined the themes of body and identity. As the title of the piece suggested, He Chengyao performed a series of exercises in front of a large group of audiences, while her naked body was tightly wrapped with tape. Her movement caused the tape to be ripped apart one by one. She also wrapped herself with the sticky side of the tape out, which made her body parts stuck together and making it increasingly harder to perform the exercise.

=== Sculpture ===
==== "Your Body" ====
Xiang Jing is a Beijing-based sculptor. She is best known for her depiction of realistic nude women sculptures. One of her sculptures, "Your Body", portrays a nude and bald woman slumping in a chair with her legs spread open. There's a prominent scar on the right side of her abdomen. She has sagging breasts, belly fat rolls, and blank expression on her face. None of these qualities fall under the expectation of the ideal female body.

== Representation of contemporary women artists in exhibitions ==
Though efforts have been made in order to make the visual art field more inclusive, women's artworks have still been underrepresented in major exhibitions. In the late 1980s, when the first major Chinese Art exhibition took place, only five women, out of sixty-seven artists and participants, were included in the show. While artists from mainland China, Taiwan, and Hong Kong, were being recognized for their diverse identities, women artists' participation in this first Chinese exhibition were not acknowledged.

Similarly, in the traveling exhibition, Transience: Chinese Experimental Art at the End of Twentieth Century in 1998, only three women artists presented their artworks. The curator of this exhibition, Wu Hung, intended to provide a platform for experimental Chinese art to take place. However, it appears that women's innovative artistic expressions were still being excluded and didn't gain as many recognition as male Chinese artists have had.

The issue of unequal representation among male and female Chinese artists did receive some attention from the public. As a result, curators and artists have made a joint effort to devote certain exhibition and publications solely for female artists.

=== Century Women, National Gallery of China, Beijing (1998) ===
Century Women was one of the first exhibitions dedicated to Chinese women artists. It intended to raise awareness on female experiences, roles, subject matters, and most importantly, art practices through the perspective of women living in contemporary Chinese society. In addition to providing a platform to showcase artworks made by Chinese women, it also exhibited photos and documents showing women's art production in China. More than seventy artists participated in this exhibition and presented over five hundred pieces of artworks

=== Her Presence in Colors VIII: International Women Artists Exhibition, National Gallery of China, Beijing (2008) ===
This exhibition was held concurrently around the world, such as China, Singapore, Germany, and the United States, to spread pan-Asian feminist artworks. Specifically, the show in New York, Against the Tide (1998), featured five female artists who were born in China and grew up during the Cultural Revolution. Cai Jin, who also participated in this show, presented her Banana Plant series in the show, which is a suggestive form of presenting female nude bodies in a public space.

== See also ==
- List of Chinese women artists
