= Juan Alberto Rosas =

Mexican boxer

Personal information
- Nicknames: El Topo ("The mole"); The Monster
- Born: Juan Alberto Rosas Quintanilla; 28 November 1984 (age 41) Tepic, Nayarit, Mexico
- Height: 5 ft 4 in (163 cm)
- Weight: Flyweight; Super flyweight; Bantamweight

Boxing career
- Reach: 66 in (168 cm)
- Stance: Orthodox

Boxing record
- Total fights: 51
- Wins: 41
- Win by KO: 28
- Losses: 10

Juan Alberto Rosas (born 28 November 1984) is a Mexican former professional boxer, he is the former IBF Super Flyweight champion. Juan Alberto fights out of Navojoa, Sonora, Mexico.

== Professional career ==
=== IBF Super Flyweight Championship ===
On 31 July 2010 Rosas fought Simphiwe Nongqayi for the IBF Super Flyweight championship. Juan Alberto landed a body shot that forced Nongqayi to go down in the sixth, the South African would not continue.

In December 2010, he lost the IBF junior bantamweight champion to Cristian Mijares.

=== WBA Super Flyweight interim Challenge ===
In February 2015 Rosas would challenge for the interim WBA super-flyweight title, he would lose via unanimous decision.

== Professional boxing record ==
51 fights	41 wins	10 losses
By knockout	28	1
By decision	13	9

No.	Result	Record	Opponent	Type	Round, time	Date	Location	Notes
51	Loss	41–10	Jesus Arevalo	UD	12	30 July 2016	Auditorio Municipal, Cabo San Lucas, Mexico	For vacant WBC Latino featherweight title
50	Win	41–9	Jonatan Lecona Ramos	SD	10	17 October 2015	Palenque de la Feria, Tepic, Mexico	
49	Loss	40–9	David Sánchez	TKO	10 (12), 0:33	14 February 2015	Palenque de la Expo Gan, Hermosillo, Mexico	For WBA Interim super flyweight title
48	Win	40–8	Jose Cifuentes	TKO	7 (8), 2:04	27 September 2014	Palenque de la Feria, Tuxtla Gutiérrez, Mexico	
47	Win	39–8	Alejandro Gonzalez	TD	9 (10)	5 April 2014	Caliente Hipódromo, Tijuana, Mexico	Cut over Rosas' right eye caused by a clash of heads
46	Loss	38–8	Daniel Rosas	UD	10	26 October 2013	Caliente Hipódromo, Tijuana, Mexico	
45	Win	38–7	Fernando Vargas Parra	UD	10	6 July 2013	Palenque de la Feria, Tepic, Mexico	
44	Win	37–7	Jose Carlos Vargas	SD	10	28 July 2012	Palenque de la Feria, Tepic, Mexico	
43	Loss	36–7	Juan Carlos Sánchez Jr.	UD	12	19 May 2012	Arena TKT Box Tour, Puerto Vallarta, Mexico	For IBF super flyweight title
42	Win	36–6	Zolani Tete	MD	12	26 November 2011	Plaza de Toros Rea, Mazatlán, Mexico	
41	Win	35–6	Fernando Vargas Parra	SD	10	2 August 2011	Polideportivo Municipal, El Rosario, Mexico	
40	Win	34–6	Jhon Alberto Molina	RTD	5 (10), 3:00	21 May 2011	Arena Jorge Cuesy Serrano, Tuxtla Gutiérrez, Mexico	
39	Win	33–6	Jesus Vasquez	UD	10	5 March 2011	Palenque de la Feria, Tepic, Mexico	
38	Loss	32–6	Cristian Mijares	UD	12	11 December 2010	Auditorio Municipal, Torreón, Mexico	Lost IBF super-flyweight title
37	Win	32–5	Simphiwe Nongqayi	TKO	6 (12), 1:00	31 July 2010	Palenque de la Feria, Tepic, Mexico	Won IBF super-flyweight title
36	Win	31–5	Federico Catubay	UD	12	13 November 2009	House of Blues, Paradise, Nevada, U.S.	
35	Win	30–5	Alejandro Martinez	UD	10	25 July 2009	Palenque del Recinto Ferial, Nuevo Vallarta, Mexico	Martinez went into coma after bout; he died on 18 August 2012
34	Win	29–5	Reynaldo Cajina	TKO	8 (12), 0:50	7 March 2009	Gimnasio INDEJ, Tepic, Mexico	Won vacant WBC Latino super-flyweight title
33	Loss	28–5	Fernando Montiel	UD	10	2 November 2008	Feria Nacional de San Marcos, Aguascalientes, Mexico	
32	Loss	28–4	Rodrigo Guerrero	SD	12	26 July 2008	Tlajomulco de Zúñiga, Mexico	For vacant WBC Continental Americas bantamweight title
31	Win	28–3	Saturnino Nava	TKO	6 (10)	5 July 2008	Collage Club, Puerto Vallarta, Mexico	
30	Win	27–3	Juan Jose Francisco	KO	6 (10)	8 March 2008	El Circulo, Guadalajara, Mexico	
29	Win	26–3	Valerio Sanchez	PTS	12	14 September 2007	Tepic, Mexico	Won vacant Mexican super-flyweight title
28	Loss	25–3	A. J. Banal	UD	8	5 May 2007	MGM Grand Garden Arena, Paradise, Nevada, U.S.	
27	Loss	25–2	Sergio Espinoza	UD	10	17 March 2007	Mandalay Bay, Paradise, Nevada, U.S.	
26	Loss	25–1	José López	MD	12	16 December 2006	Coliseo Antonio R. Barcelo, Toa Baja, Puerto Rico	For WBA Fedecentro and WBC Latino flyweight titles
25	Win	25–0	Jorge Romero	KO	3 (10)	28 July 2006	Gimnasio Ricardo Velarde Osuna, Tepic, Mexico	
24	Win	24–0	Everardo Morales	UD	12	16 November 2005	Palenque de la Feria, Tepic, Mexico	Retained Mexican flyweight title; Won vacant NABF flyweight title
23	Win	23–0	Valerio Sanchez	UD	12	1 October 2005	Palenque de la Feria, Tepic, Mexico	Won Mexican flyweight title
22	Win	22–0	Raul Garay Carreon	KO	2 (?)	23 April 2005	Tepic, Mexico	
21	Win	21–0	Fred Herberto Valdez	TKO	4 (?)	12 March 2005	Tepic, Mexico	
20	Win	20–0	Valentin Leon	TKO	8 (10), 1:19	7 February 2005	Discoteca Baby Rock, Tijuana, Mexico	
19	Win	19–0	Cruz Molina	TKO	3 (6), 1:46	19 November 2004	Gimnasio de Mexicali, Mexicali, Mexico	
18	Win	18–0	Lauro Lopez	UD	10	4 September 2004	Tepic, Mexico	
17	Win	17–0	Noe Acosta	KO	1 (?)	24 June 2004	Tepic, Mexico	
16	Win	16–0	Vicente Hernandez	KO	10 (12), 2:00	15 May 2004	Arena Jalisco, Guadalajara, Mexico	
15	Win	15–0	Cesar Ricardo Martinez	KO	7 (10)	27 March 2004	Tepic, Mexico	
14	Win	14–0	Omar Niño Romero	KO	9 (?)	21 February 2004	Tepic, Mexico	
13	Win	13–0	German Paniagua	KO	1 (4)	1 February 2004	Tepic, Mexico	
12	Win	12–0	Gaspar Chavez	KO	2 (?)	30 August 2003	Tepic, Mexico	
11	Win	11–0	Vicente Hernandez	KO	10 (?)	9 August 2003	Tepic, Mexico	
10	Win	10–0	Ricardo Astorga	KO	2 (?)	24 May 2003	Las Peñas, Mexico	
9	Win	9–0	Jesús Jiménez	TKO	5 (8)	15 March 2003	Tepic, Mexico	
8	Win	8–0	Fernando Ramirez	KO	1 (?)	2 January 2003	Tepic, Mexico	
7	Win	7–0	Jesús Jiménez	TKO	6 (6)	14 December 2002	Tepic, Mexico	
6	Win	6–0	Juan Rodriguez	KO	4 (?)	21 July 2002	Tepic, Mexico	
5	Win	5–0	Manuel Montiel	KO	1 (?)	1 December 2001	Tepic, Mexico	
4	Win	4–0	Luis Perea	KO	2 (?)	22 October 2001	Tepic, Mexico	
3	Win	3–0	Miguel Rios	KO	3 (?)	13 October 2001	Tepic, Mexico	
2	Win	2–0	Randy Lopez	KO	4 (?)	25 August 2001	Tepic, Mexico	
1	Win	1–0	Raul Garay Carreon	KO	1 (?)	23 March 2001	Tepic, Mexico	

== See also ==
- List of Mexican boxing world champions
- List of world super-flyweight boxing champions

Sporting positions
Regional boxing titles
Preceded by Valerio Sánchez	Mexican flyweight champion 1 October 2005 – 2006; Vacated	Vacant Title next held by José Cabrera
Vacant Title last held by Brian Viloria	NABF flyweight champion 26 November 2005 – 2006; Vacated	Vacant Title next held by Gilberto Keb Baas
Vacant Title last held by Jovanny Soto Ramirez	Mexican super-flyweight champion 14 September 2007 – 2008; Vacated	Vacant Title next held by Marco Antonio Hernandez
Vacant Title last held by Julio David Roque Ler	WBC Latino super-flyweight champion 7 March 2009 – 31 July 2010; Won world title	Vacant Title next held by Javier Nicolas Chacon
World boxing titles
Preceded by Simphiwe Nongqayi	IBF super-flyweight champion 31 July 2010 – 11 December 2010	Succeeded by Cristian Mijares
