= Boxing at the 2014 Commonwealth Games – Bantamweight =

Boxing competitions

Boxing – Flyweight at the 2014 Commonwealth Games
- Venue: Scottish Exhibition and Conference Centre
- Dates: 25 July – 2 August 2014
- Competitors: 18 from 18 nations

Medalists
gold medal	Michael Conlan	Northern Ireland
silver medal	Qais Ashfaq	England
bronze medal	Sean McGoldrick	Wales
bronze medal	Benson Gicharu Njangiru	Kenya

The Bantamweight boxing competition at the 2014 Commonwealth Games in Glasgow, Scotland took place between 25 July and 2 August at the Scottish Exhibition and Conference Centre. Bantamweights were limited to those boxers weighing above 52 kilograms to 56 kilograms.

Like all Commonwealth boxing events, the competition was a straight single-elimination tournament. Both semifinal losers were awarded bronze medals, so no boxers competed again after their first loss. Bouts consisted of three rounds of three minutes each, with one-minute breaks between rounds. Punches scored only if the front of the glove made full contact with the front of the head or torso of the opponent. Tree scored each bout; The winner of the bout was the boxer who won the most rounds.

== Schedule ==
All times are British Summer Time (UTC+1)

Date	Time	Round
Friday 25 July 2014	13:00	Round of 32
Monday 28 July 2014	13:20 & 18:30	Round of 16
Wednesday 30 July 2014	13:00	Quarter-finals
Friday 1 August 2014	13:10	Semi-finals
Saturday 2 August 2014	14:10	Final

== Medalists ==
Gold	Michael Conlan; Northern Ireland
Silver	Qais Ashfaq; England
Bronze	Sean McGoldrick; Wales
Bronze	Benson Gicharu Njangiru; Kenya

== Results ==
Round of 32
Mathew Martin (NRU)	0
Michael Conlan (NIR)	3
Benson Gicharu Njangiru (KEN)	3
Imran Khan (GUY)	0

Round of 16
Shiva Thapa (IND)	0
Michael Conlan (NIR)	3
Bashir Nasir (UGA)	2
Emiliani Patrick Polino (TAN)	1
Ayabonga Sonjica (RSA)	3
Manju Wanniarachchi (SRI)	0
Jackson Woods (AUS)	1
Sean McGoldrick (WAL)	2
Nadir Nadir (PAK)	0
Joe Ham (SCO)	3
Neo Thamahane (LES)	0
Qais Ashfaq (ENG)	3
Tafari Ebanks (CAY)	KO2
Henry Umings (PNG)
Benson Gicharu Njangiru (KEN)	3
Sikiru Ojo (NGR)	0

Quarterfinals
Michael Conlan (NIR)	3
Bashir Nasir (UGA)	0
Ayabonga Sonjica (RSA)	1
Sean McGoldrick (WAL)	2
Joe Ham (SCO)	0
Qais Ashfaq (ENG)	3
Tafari Ebanks (CAY)	0
Benson Gicharu Njangiru (KEN)	3

Semifinals
Michael Conlan (NIR)	3
Sean McGoldrick (WAL)	0
Qais Ashfaq (ENG)	3
Benson Gicharu Njangiru (KEN)	0

Final
Michael Conlan (NIR)	3
Qais Ashfaq (ENG)	0
