= Joe Ham =

Scottish boxer (born 1991)

Personal information
- Nationality: Scottish
- Born: 20 June 1991 (age 35) Glasgow, Scotland
- Weight: Super-bantamweight

Boxing career
- Stance: Orthodox

Boxing record
- Total fights: 21
- Wins: 17
- Win by KO: 6
- Losses: 4

Joseph Ham (born 20 June 1991) is a Scottish former professional boxer. As an amateur, he competed at the 2013 World Championships, as well as two European Championships and two Commonwealth Games.

== Early years ==
Born and raised in the Gorbals, Ham began boxing at the age of 12 as a way to get fit and lose weight, initially joining Dennistoun McNair ABC. He followed the advice of his father, also named Joseph, who was a former boxer himself. Just a year later he won the Scottish national championship, his first at the youth level. After turning 18 he started training at Hayfield ABC in the Gorbals.

Ham won a total of ten Scottish championships, and was a two-time British champion as well. Following his round of 16 loss to Sakaria Lukas at the 2010 Commonwealth Games, he collapsed in his training room and required medical assistance. The following year he won a gold medal at the 2011 GB Amateur Boxing Championships in London, defeating 2010 Commonwealth gold medallist Sean McGoldrick in the final. In March 2014 he won his fifth consecutive Scottish national title at the senior level, securing his spot at the 2014 Commonwealth Games in his hometown. At the Games, Ham defeated Nadir Nadir of Pakistan in the round of 16 before getting knocked out in the quarterfinals by longtime rival Qais Ashfaq.

=== Amateur results ===
Incomplete for early years

- 2007 British Cadet (Junior) Championships in Edinburgh, Scotland (flyweight - 1991 division)
  - Defeated Nico Morrison (Wales) 7–6
  - Lost to Gamal Yafai (England) 4–9 (silver)
- 2007 European Union Cadet (Junior) Championships in Porto Torres, Italy (flyweight)
  - Lost to Mehmet Topcakan (Turkey) 7–25
- 2008 Franko Blagonic Junior Memorial in Rijeka, Croatia (bantamweight)
  - Defeated Elvis Dodaj (Croatia) 29–13
  - Lost to Magomed Kurbanov (Russia) WO (bronze)
- 2008 British Youth Championships in Edinburgh, Scotland (flyweight - 1991 division)
  - Lost to James Dickens (England) 5–8
- 2008 Brandenburg Junior Cup in Frankfurt an der Oder, Germany (flyweight)
  - Defeated Zsolt Dobradi (Hungary) RSCO3
  - Lost to Oualid Belaouara (France) 11–27
- 2009 Pyynikki Tournament in Tampere, Finland (bantamweight - youth division)
  - Defeated Miikka Koskela (Finland) 5–0
  - Defeated Romans Belousovs (Latvia) RSC3
  - Defeated Allan Cameron (Scotland) WO (gold)
- 2009 Franko Blagonic Youth Memorial in Rijeka, Croatia (bantamweight)
  - Defeated Damjan Herljevic (Croatia) AB3
  - Defeated Edgar Walth (Germany) 22–10 (gold)
- 2009 Presidents Cup (youth) in Grudziądz, Poland (bantamweight)
  - Lost to Kamil Łaszczyk (Poland) 3–9
- 2009 Mostar International Youth Tournament in Mostar, Bosnia and Herzegovina (bantamweight)
  - Defeated Zlatko Catic (Bosnia and Herzegovina) RSC2
  - Lost to Elian Dimitrov (Bulgaria) 12–18 (silver)
- 2009 British Youth Championships in Liverpool, England (bantamweight - 1991 division)
  - Defeated Peter Cope (England) 9–6
  - Defeated Sean McGoldrick (Wales) 5–2 (gold)
- 2009 European Youth Championships in Szczecin, Poland (bantamweight)
  - Defeated Pavlo Ishchenko (Ukraine) 6–5
  - Lost to Elvin Isayev (Azerbaijan) 0–1
- 2009 Tammer Tournament in Tamprere, Finland (featherweight)
  - Defeated Wael Al-Khaghani (Finland) RSC2
  - Defeated Brahim Zendaoui (France) 9–2
  - Lost to Martin Ward (England) 4–9 (silver)
- 2009 Golden Gong in Skopje, Macedonia (bantamweight)
  - Defeated Elian Dimitrov (Bulgaria) (gold)
- 2010 Scottish National Championships in Aberdeen/Coatbridge, Scotland (bantamweight)
  - Defeated Danny Singh WO
  - Defeated John Thomson 4–1 (gold)
- 2010 Gee-Bee Tournament in Helsinki, Finland (bantamweight)
  - Lost to Zafar Parpiev (Russia) 4–12
- 2010 European Championships in Moscow, Russia (bantamweight)
  - Lost to Matti Koota (Finland) 2–9
- 2010 Commonwealth Games in New Delhi, India (bantamweight)
  - Lost to Sakaria Lukas (Namibia) 11–14
- 2011 Scottish National Championships in Coatbridge, Scotland (bantamweight)
  - Defeated Stephen Tiffney 6–5
  - Defeated David Dickson 10–3 (gold)
- 2011 Beogradski Pobednik in Belgrade, Serbia (bantamweight)
  - Lost to Shiva Thapa (India) 1–5
- 2011 Great Britain Championships in London, England (bantamweight)
  - Defeated Alimaan Hussain (England) 14–8
  - Defeated Sean McGoldrick (Wales) 25–14 (gold)
- 2011 Tammer Tournament in Tampere, Finland (bantamweight)
  - Lost to Qais Ashfaq (England) 10–12 (bronze)
- 2012 Scottish National Championships in Edinburgh/Inverurie, Scotland (bantamweight)
  - Defeated David Dickson 15–10
  - Defeated Graeme Munro RSC2 (gold)
- 2012 Olympic Gloves Tournament in Tallinn, Estonia (bantamweight)
  - Defeated Alexandr Bykadorov (Russia) 7–6
  - Lost to Sean McGoldrick (Wales) 2–6 (silver)
- 2012 Great Britain Championships in London, England (bantamweight)
  - Lost to Sean McGoldrick (Wales) 14–17 (bronze)
- 2012 Tammer Tournament in Tampere, Finland (bantamweight)
  - Lost to Michael Nevin (Ireland) 8–18
- 2013 Scottish National Championships in Edinburgh, Scotland (bantamweight)
  - Defeated Scott McCormack 12–5
  - Defeated Stephen Tiffney 12–11
  - Defeated Kevin Skey 18–11 (gold)
- 2013 Beogradski Pobednik in Belgrade, Serbia (bantamweight)
  - Lost to Razvan Andreiana (Romania) 7–10
- 2013 Hakija Turajlic Memorial in Sarajevo, Bosnia and Herzegovina (bantamweight)
  - Defeated Othman Arbabi (Qatar) TKO1
  - Defeated David Cufaj (Bosnia and Herzegovina) RSC2 (gold)
- 2013 European Championships in Minsk, Belarus (bantamweight)
  - Defeated Mateusz Mazik (Poland) 2–1
  - Lost to Vladimir Nikitin (Russia) 0–3
- 2013 World Championships in Almaty, Kazakhstan (bantamweight)
  - Defeated Yakub Meredov (Turkmenistan) 3–0
  - Lost to Mykola Butsenko (Ukraine) 0–3
- 2013 Tammer Tournament in Tampere, Finland (bantamweight)
  - Lost to Qais Ashfaq (England) 0–3
- 2014 Scottish National Championships in Glasgow, Scotland (bantamweight)
  - Defeated David Dickson 2–1
  - Defeated Brandon Singh PTS (gold)
- 2014 Commonwealth Games in Glasgow, Scotland (bantamweight)
  - Defeated Nadir Nadir (Pakistan) 3–0
  - Lost to Qais Ashfaq (England) 0–3

== Professional career ==
Ham made his professional debut on 14 December 2014, defeating journeyman Dato Kvaratskhelia by first-round knockout (KO) at the Thistle Hotel in Glasgow. He won the vacant Scottish Area super-bantamweight title on 15 April 2017, beating Scott McCormack on points on the Ricky Burns–Julius Indongo undercard for his first title. His employer, Glasgow-based construction firm City Building, gave him seven weeks off to train in preparation for the fight. He suffered his first defeat as a professional on 30 June 2018, losing to southpaw Tyrone McCullagh by unanimous decision (UD) in Belfast with the vacant Celtic super-bantamweight title on the line. After two more victories back home, Ham travelled to Manchester to challenge for the vacant WBA Continental super-bantamweight title on 2 November 2019 against Qais Ashfaq, who had knocked him out of the 2014 Commonwealth Games quarterfinals. In their rematch five years later, an accidental headclash in the sixth round caused the referee to halt the bout and go to the judges, who awarded Ashfaq the unanimous technical decision victory with scores of 70–63, 70–64 and 69–64.

In September 2020 it was announced that Ham had signed with MTK Global.

Ham fought Dennis McCann for the vacant Commonwealth super-bantamweight title at The O2 Arena in London on 26 November 2022, losing by stoppage in the eighth round.

He retired from professional boxing in July 2023 and joined Boxing Scotland as a coach.

== Professional boxing record ==
21 fights	17 wins	4 losses
By knockout	6	1
By decision	11	3

No.	Result	Record	Opponent	Type	Round, time	Date	Location	Notes
21	Loss	17–4	(United Kingdom) Dennis McCann	TKO	8 (12), 2:28	26 Nov 2022	(United Kingdom) The O2 Arena, London, England	For vacant Commonwealth super-bantamweight title
20	Win	17–3	(United Kingdom) Rickey Starkey	PTS	4	13 May 2022	(United Kingdom) SSE Hydro, Glasgow, Scotland	
19	Loss	16–3	(United Kingdom) Jack Bateson	PTS	8	17 Apr 2021	(United Kingdom) Bolton Whites Hotel, Bolton, England	
18	Loss	16–2	(United Kingdom) Qais Ashfaq	TD	7 (10), 0:01	2 Nov 2019	(United Kingdom) Manchester Arena, Manchester, England	For vacant WBA Continental super-bantamweight title; Unanimous TD after Ham cut from accidental head clash
17	Win	16–1	(Nicaragua) Jerson Larios	TKO	1 (6), 2:19	31 May 2019	(United Kingdom) DoubleTree by Hilton Hotel, Glasgow, Scotland	
16	Win	15–1	(United Kingdom) Scott McCormack	PTS	6	1 Mar 2019	(United Kingdom) DoubleTree by Hilton Hotel, Glasgow, Scotland	
15	Loss	14–1	(United Kingdom) Tyrone McCullagh	UD	10	30 Jun 2018	(United Kingdom) SSE Arena, Belfast, Northern Ireland	For vacant Celtic super-bantamweight title
14	Win	14–0	(Nicaragua) Edwin Tellez	PTS	6	3 Mar 2018	(United Kingdom) SSE Hydro, Glasgow, Scotland	
13	Win	13–0	(Ecuador) Jefferson Vargas	PTS	6	10 Dec 2017	(United Kingdom) DoubleTree by Hilton Hotel, Glasgow, Scotland	
12	Win	12–0	(Nicaragua) José Aguilar	PTS	6	7 Oct 2017	(United Kingdom) Manchester Arena, Manchester, England	
11	Win	11–0	(United Kingdom) Scott McCormack	PTS	10	15 Apr 2017	(United Kingdom) SSE Hydro, Glasgow, Scotland	Won vacant Scottish Area super-bantamweight title
10	Win	10–0	(Mexico) Joseafat Reyes	PTS	6	18 Dec 2016	(United Kingdom) The Glasgow City Hotel, Glasgow, Scotland	
9	Win	9–0	(Nicaragua) Elvis Guillén	PTS	4	7 Oct 2016	(United Kingdom) SSE Hydro, Glasgow, Scotland	
8	Win	8–0	(United Kingdom) Paul Holt	PTS	6	28 May 2016	(United Kingdom) SSE Hydro, Glasgow, Scotland	
7	Win	7–0	(Latvia) Dmitrijs Gutmans	TKO	1 (6), 2:45	18 Mar 2016	(United Kingdom) The Glasgow City Hotel, Glasgow, Scotland	
6	Win	6–0	(Croatia) Mirsad Ahmeti	TKO	2 (6), 2:02	13 Dec 2015	(United Kingdom) The Glasgow City Hotel, Glasgow, Scotland	
5	Win	5–0	(Hungary) Miklos Hevesi	TKO	2 (4), 1:59	4 Sep 2015	(United Kingdom) Thistle Hotel, Glasgow, Scotland	
4	Win	4–0	(United Kingdom) Jamie Quinn	PTS	4	22 May 2015	(United Kingdom) Thistle Hotel, Glasgow, Scotland	
3	Win	3–0	(Hungary) Aron Szilagyi	PTS	4	2 May 2015	(United Kingdom) Gorbals Leisure Centre, Glasgow, Scotland	
2	Win	2–0	(Lithuania) Aivaras Balsys	TKO	2 (4), 1:10	6 Mar 2015	(United Kingdom) Thistle Hotel, Glasgow, Scotland	
1	Win	1–0	(Georgia (country)) Dato Kvaratskhelia	KO	1 (4), 1:04	14 Dec 2014	(United Kingdom) Thistle Hotel, Glasgow, Scotland	
