= Alejandro Hernández (boxer) =

Mexican boxer

Personal information
- Nickname: Payasito
- Born: José Alejandro Hernández Hernández; June 16, 1986 (age 40) Iztapalapa, Mexico City, Mexico
- Height: 5 ft 6 in (168 cm)
- Weight: Flyweight; Super flyweight; Bantamweight; Super bantamweight

Boxing career
- Reach: 66 in (168 cm)
- Stance: Orthodox

Boxing record
- Total fights: 46
- Wins: 31
- Win by KO: 16
- Losses: 13
- Draws: 2

José Alejandro Hernández Hernández (born June 16, 1986) is a Mexican former professional boxer.

== Professional career ==
Hernández turned professional in 2002 & compiled a record of 27–10–2 before facing & defeating compatriot Daniel Rosas, to win the WBO interim bantamweight title. He would challenge for the full title in his next fight against Japan's Tomoki Kameda, he would lose via split decision.

== Professional boxing record ==
46 fights	31 wins	13 losses
By knockout	16	3
By decision	14	10
By disqualification	1	0
Draws	2	

No.	Result	Record	Opponent	Type	Round, time	Date	Location	Notes
46	Loss	31–13–2	Nordine Oubaali	TKO	10 (12)	2017-06-02	Palais des Sports Porte de Versailles, Paris, France	
45	Loss	31–12–2	Emmanuel Dominguez	KO	4 (10)	2016-09-30	Auditorio BB, Mexico City, Mexico	Lost Mexican super bantamweight title
44	Win	31–11–2	Isao Gonzalo Carranza	UD	10 (10)	2016-03-18	Auditorio Blackberry, Mexico City, Mexico	Won vacant Mexican super bantamweight title
43	Win	30–11–2	Humberto Morales	TKO	8 (12)	2015-08-07	Auditorio Blackberry, Mexico City, Mexico	Won vacant Mexican super bantamweight title
42	Win	29–11–2	Martin Casillas Martinez	UD	10 (10)	2015-03-20	Auditorio Blackberry, Mexico City, Mexico	Won vacant WBC Latino bantamweight title
41	Loss	28–11–2	Tomoki Kameda	SD	12 (12)	2014-11-01	UIC Pavilion, Chicago, Illinois, U.S.	For WBO bantamweight title
40	Win	28–10–2	Daniel Rosas	UD	12 (12)	2014-06-14	Arena Jorge Cuesy Serrano, Tuxtla Gutiérrez, Mexico	Won interim WBO bantamweight title
39	Win	27–10–2	Marvin Mabait	KO	5 (12)	2014-03-28	Foro Polanco, Mexico City, Mexico	Won WBO Inter-Continental bantamweight title
38	Win	26–10–2	Isao Gonzalo Carranza	UD	12 (12)	2014-01-04	Deportivo Guelatao, Colonia Lugunilla, Mexico	Won vacant Mexican bantamweight title
37	Loss	25–10–2	Akifumi Shimoda	UD	10 (10)	2013-09-07	Korakuen Hall, Tokyo, Japan	
36	Win	25–9–2	Aldo Arteaga	KO	1 (8)	2013-05-18	Foro Polanco, Polanco, Mexico	
35	Loss	24–9–2	Léo Santa Cruz	RTD	3 (10)	2012-01-21	Bodega Del Boxeo, Ensenada, Mexico	
34	Loss	24–8–2	Orlando Rizo	UD	12 (12)	2011-04-16	Gimnasio Alexis Arguello, Managua, Nicaragua	
33	Win	24–7–2	Jesus Ceja	TKO	7 (10)	2010-07-23	Jose Cuervo Salon, Polanco, Mexico	Won vacant WBC Latino bantamweight title
32	Win	23–7–2	Gabriel Rangel	TKO	6 (10)	2010-05-08	Auditorio Plaza Condesa, Mexico City, Mexico	
31	Draw	22–7–2	Marvin Sonsona	SD	12 (12)	2009-11-21	Casino Rama, Rama, Ontario, Canada	For vacant WBO super flyweight title
30	Loss	22–7–1	Wilbert Uicab	UD	12 (12)	2009-09-11	Salon Marbet Plus, Ciudad Nezahualcóyotl, Mexico	For Mexican & NABF flyweight titles
29	Win	22–6–1	Jose Tamayo Gonzalez	TKO	10 (10)	2009-07-08	Foro Scotiabank, Polanco, Mexico	
28	Win	21–6–1	Juan Jose Francisco Marquez	TKO	6 (10)	2009-04-22	Foro Scotiabank, Polanco, Mexico	
27	Loss	20–6–1	Omar Narváez	UD	12 (12)	2008-09-20	Nuevo Palacio Aurinegro, Puerto Madryn, Argentina	For WBO flyweight title
26	Win	20–5–1	Jose Alberto Cuadros	UD	12 (12)	2008-04-30	Foro Scotiabank, Polanco, Mexico	
25	Loss	19–5–1	Carlos Tamara	UD	12 (12)	2007-12-07	Miccosukee Resort & Gaming, Miami, Florida, U.S.	For WBO & WBC Latino flyweight titles
24	Win	19–4–1	Luis Doria	UD	8 (8)	2007-08-24	Miccosukee Resort & Gaming, Miami, Florida, U.S.	
23	Win	18–4–1	Marlon Marquez	TD	9 (12)	2007-06-01	Miccosukee Resort & Gaming, Miami, Florida, U.S.	Retained WBO Latino flyweight title
22	Win	17–4–1	Jonathan Pérez	UD	12 (12)	2007-02-16	Celebrity Theatre, Phoenix, Arizona, U.S.	Won WBO Latino flyweight title
21	Win	16–4–1	Kevin Hudgins	MD	6 (6)	2006-12-08	Civic Center, Kissimmee, Florida, U.S.	
20	Win	15–4–1	Gilberto Keb Baas	MD	12 (12)	2006-07-15	Cancha Revolucion, Ciudad Del Carmen, Mexico	
19	Win	14–4–1	Raul Eliseo Medina	TKO	10 (12)	2006-04-21	Salon Marbet Plus, Ciudad Nezahualcóyotl, Mexico	
18	Win	13–4–1	Vidal Robledo	TKO	5 (12)	2006-02-19	Cancha Revolucion, Ciudad Del Carmen, Mexico	
17	Win	12–4–1	Zacarias Chan	TKO	9 (10)	2005-12-02	Cancha Revolucion, Ciudad Del Carmen, Mexico	
16	Win	11–4–1	Dolores Osorio	TKO	2 (10)	2005-10-29	Ciudad Del Carmen, Mexico	
15	Win	10–4–1	Zacarias Chan	SD	10 (10)	2005-09-10	Arena Sufy, Merida, Mexico	
14	Win	9–4–1	Abel Ochoa	UD	10 (10)	2005-07-07	Salon 21, Mexico City, Mexico	
13	Win	8–4–1	Jorge Romero	TKO	4 (8)	2005-03-04	Discoteca Esfinge, Ciudad Nezahualcóyotl, Mexico	
12	Loss	7–4–1	José Cabrera	UD	8 (8)	2005-01-21	Arena Coliseo, Monterrey, Mexico	
11	Draw	7–3–1	José Cabrera	PTS	8 (8)	2004-09-03	Arena Coliseo, Monterrey, Mexico	
10	Win	7–3	Carlos Valdivia	TKO	2 (6)	2004-01-10	Centro Banamex, Mexico City, Mexico	
9	Loss	6–3	Adalberto Borquez Covarrubias	SD	6 (6)	2003-12-19	Mexico	
8	Win	6–2	Carlos Valdivia	UD	4 (4)	2003-11-08	Deportivo Tlalli, Tlalnepantla, Mexico	
7	Loss	5–2	Edgar Cordero	UD	4 (4)	2003-06-12	Salon La Maraka, Mexico City, Mexico	
6	Win	5–1	Emanuel Hernandez	DQ	1 (4)	2003-02-22	Plaza de Toros México, Mexico City, Mexico	
5	Win	4–1	Esteban Jimenez	TKO	1 (4)	2002-11-28	Foro Las Americas, Mexico City, Mexico	
4	Win	3–1	Hugo Jimenez	UD	6 (6)	2002-11-01	Deportivo Tlalli, Tlalnepantla, Mexico	
3	Win	2–1	Zeferino Romero	TKO	3 (4)	2002-06-26	Salon 21, Mexico City, Mexico	
2	Win	1–1	Guillermo Sanchez	TKO	1 (4)	2002-06-12	Salon 21, Mexico City, Mexico	
1	Loss	0–1	Jeremias Segovia Garcia	SD	6 (6)	2002-04-06	Villahermosa, Mexico	

Sporting positions
Regional boxing titles
Preceded by Jonathan Pérez	WBO Latino flyweight champion February 16, 2007 – December 7, 2007	Succeeded by Carlos Tamara
Vacant Title last held by Jose Angel Beranza	WBC Latino bantamweight champion July 23, 2010 – 2010; Vacated	Vacant Title next held by Óscar Escandón
Vacant Title last held by Rodolfo Hernandez Montoya	Mexican bantamweight champion January 4, 2014 – 2014; Vacated	Vacant Title next held by Julio César Miranda
Preceded by Marvin Mabait	WBO Inter-Continental bantamweight champion March 28, 2014 – 2014; Vacated	Vacant Title next held by Klaas Mboyane
Vacant Title last held by Carlos Carlson	WBC Latino bantamweight champion March 20, 2015 – 2015; Vacated	Vacant Title next held by Carlos Carlson
Vacant Title last held by Genaro Camargo	Mexican super bantamweight champion August 7, 2015 – 2015; Vacated	Vacant Title next held by Jesus Acosta Zazueta
Vacant Title last held by Jesus Acosta Zazueta	Mexican super bantamweight champion March 18, 2016 – September 30, 2016	Succeeded by Emmanuel Dominguez
World boxing titles
Vacant Title last held by Eric Morel	WBO bantamweight champion Interim title June 14, 2014 – November 1, 2014; Lost bid for full title	Vacant Title next held by Zolani Tete
