= Mario Antonio Macias =

Mexican boxer (born 1985)

Mario Macias
Personal information
- Nickname: Huracán
- Born: Mario Antonio Macias Orozco; 25 July 1985 (age 40) Iztacalco, Mexico City, Mexico
- Height: 1.65 m (5 ft 5 in)
- Weight: Super bantamweight Bantamweight

Boxing career
- Reach: 170 cm (67 in)
- Stance: Orthodox

Boxing record
- Total fights: 52
- Wins: 28
- Win by KO: 13
- Losses: 23
- Draws: 0
- No contests: 1

Mario Antonio Macias Orozco (born 25 July 1985) is a Mexican professional boxer who challenged for the WBA bantamweight title in 2011.

== Professional career ==
On 7 December 2011, Macias fought Kōki Kameda in Osaka for the WBA bantamweight title. He was knocked out in the fourth round.

== Professional boxing record ==
52 fights	28 wins	23 losses
By knockout	14	16
By decision	13	7
By disqualification	1	0
No contests	1	

No.	Result	Record	Opponent	Type	Round, time	Date	Location	Notes
52	Loss	28–23 (1)	Sakaria Lukas	KO	2 (6), 1:20	26 Feb 2021	Hotel Canopy Hilton, Cancún, Mexico	
51	Loss	28–22 (1)	Ryan Garcia	KO	1 (4), 1:14	15 Jul 2017	Kia Forum, Inglewood, California, U.S.	
50	Loss	28–21 (1)	Toka Kahn Clary	KO	2 (8), 1:53	2 Dec 2016	Twin River Event Center, Lincoln, Nebraska, U.S.	
49	Loss	28–20 (1)	Lamont Roach Jr.	KO	3 (8), 0:07	2 Sep 2016	Belasco Theater, Los Angeles, California, U.S.	
48	Loss	28–19 (1)	Gervonta Davis	KO	1 (8), 0:41	3 Jun 2016	Seminole Hard Rock Hotel & Casino, Hollywood, California, U.S.	
47	Win	28–18 (1)	Mateo Javier Pérez	TKO	7 (8), 0:34	6 May 2016	Parque Central, Frontera Comalapa, Mexico	
46	Loss	27–18 (1)	Ryan Kielczewski	UD	8	16 Apr 2016	Foxwoods Resort Casino, Mashantucket, Connecticut, U.S.	
45	Win	27–17 (1)	Ángel Enrique Aguilar	DQ	10 (10)	13 Feb 2016	Deportivo Leandro Valle, Mexico City, Mexico	
44	Loss	26–17 (1)	Rafael Vázquez	TKO	1 (8), 1:07	1 Aug 2015	Barclays Center, Brooklyn, New York, U.S.	
43	Loss	26–16 (1)	Juan Domínguez	TKO	2 (8), 2:19	22 May 2015	Claridge Hotel & Casino, Atlantic City, New Jersey, U.S.	
42	Loss	26–15 (1)	Jorge Lara	TKO	1 (8), 2:04	7 Mar 2015	MGM Grand Garden Arena, Paradise, Nevada, U.S.	
41	Loss	26–14 (1)	Moises Flores	TKO	7 (8), 1:53	21 Nov 2014	Hard Rock Hotel & Casino, Tulsa, Oklahoma, U.S.	For vacant WBC FECARBOX super bantamweight title
40	Loss	26–13 (1)	Andrés Gutiérrez	UD	12	9 Aug 2014	Auditorio General Arteaga, Querétaro, Mexico	For WBC Silver super bantamweight title
39	Win	26–12 (1)	Braulio Santos	TKO	8 (8)	1 Mar 2014	World Trade Center Mexiquense, Naucalpan, Mexico	
38	Loss	25–12 (1)	Miguel Marriaga	TKO	3 (10)	19 Oct 2013	Jose Cuervo Salon, Polanco, Mexico	
37	Loss	25–11 (1)	Javier Mercado	TKO	2 (?)	27 Jul 2013	Auditorio Miguel Barragán, San Luis Potosí, Mexico	
36	Win	25–10 (1)	Esdras Acosta	TKO	3 (6), 0:34	16 Feb 2013	Domo Deportivo, Tulum, Mexico	
35	Loss	24–10 (1)	Romulo Koasicha	MD	12	3 Nov 2012	Foro Polanco, Polanco, Mexico	For WBC-USNBC featherweight title
34	Loss	24–9 (1)	Giovanni Caro	TKO	4 (10), 2:08	17 Aug 2012	Arena Jalisco, Guadalajara, Mexico	
33	Win	24–8 (1)	Martin Casillas	UD	10	28 Apr 2012	Foro Polanco, Polanco, Mexico	
32	Loss	23–8 (1)	Kōki Kameda	KO	4 (12), 2:04	7 Dec 2011	Osaka Prefectural Gymnasium, Osaka, Japan	For WBA (Regular) bantamweight title
31	Win	23–7 (1)	Edgar Lozano	KO	7 (8), 1:03	1 Oct 2011	Centro de Expositores, Puebla, Mexico	
30	NC	22–7 (1)	Sergio Torres	NC	1 (8)	13 Aug 2011	Centro Internacional Acapulco, Acapulco, Mexico	Accidental head clash
29	Loss	22–7	Jonatan Romero	UD	10	5 Feb 2011	Coliseo Bernardo Caraballo, Cartagena, Colombia	For vacant WBO Latino super bantamweight title
28	Win	22–6	David Sánchez	SD	8	25 Nov 2010	Mexico	
27	Loss	21–6	Daniel Rosas	UD	8	17 Nov 2010	Feria de Xmatkuil, Mérida, Mexico	
26	Win	21–5	Antonio Chablet	UD	6	23 Sep 2010	Restaurante Arroyo, Mexico City, Mexico	
25	Win	20–5	Alexander Espinoza	UD	10	7 Aug 2010	Arena México, Mexico City, Mexico	
24	Win	19–5	Carlos Peñalosa	UD	10	10 Apr 2010	Domo Deportivo Metropolitano, Ciudad Nezahualcóyotl, Mexico	
23	Win	18–5	Luis Eduardo Zaragoza	UD	10	23 Jan 2010	Deportiva Juan Fernández Albarrán, Zinacantepec, Mexico	
22	Loss	17–5	Reynaldo Cajina	TKO	6 (10), 1:25	21 Nov 2009	Palenque de la Feria, Tuxtla Gutiérrez, Mexico	
21	Win	17–4	Juan José Francisco Márquez	TKO	4 (12), 2:49	26 Sep 2009	Deportivo Trabajadores del Metro, Iztacalco, Mexico	Retained WBC-NABF bantamweight title
20	Win	16–4	Ramón Camargo	KO	3 (12), 2:18	6 Aug 2009	Woda Night Club, Lomas de Sotelo, Mexico	Won vacant WBC-NABF bantamweight title
19	Win	15–4	Sebastien Gauthier	KO	2 (8), 1:20	19 Jun 2009	Bell Centre, Montreal, Canda	
18	Win	14–4	Oswaldo Juárez	UD	8	29 Nov 2008	Arena México, Mexico City, Mexico	
17	Win	13–4	Edgar Riovalle	TKO	3 (6)	29 Sep 2008	Arena México, Mexico City, Mexico	
16	Win	12–4	Balam Castellanos	TKO	1 (6)	7 Aug 2008	Roots Magic Club, Lomas de Sotelo, Mexico	
15	Win	11–4	Adrian Atanasio Vázquez	KO	3 (?)	17 Jul 2008	Roots Magic Club, Lomas de Sotelo, Mexico	
14	Win	10–4	Israel Flores	KO	8 (10)	19 Apr 2008	Salon Emperador, Iztacalco, Mexico	
13	Win	9–4	Pedro Arévalo	KO	3 (10)	8 Feb 2008	Salon Emperador, Iztacalco, Mexico	
12	Win	8–4	Carlos Peñalosa	PTS	10	16 Nov 2007	Salon Emperador, Iztacalco, Mexico	
11	Loss	7–4	Antonio Valencia	TKO	4 (6)	9 Jul 2007	Salon Los Pulgas, Tijuana, Mexico	
10	Win	7–3	Armando Guzmán	UD	?	31 Mar 2007	Centro de Cancún, Cancún, Mexico	
9	Win	6–3	Alberto Pérez	UD	8	29 Sep 2006	Salon Fascinacion, Mexico City, Mexico	
8	Loss	5–3	Adrian Téllez	UD	6	6 Jul 2006	Salon 21, Mexico City, Mexico	
7	Win	5–2	Josue Cortes	SD	6	18 May 2006	Salon 21, Mexico City, Mexico	
6	Win	4–2	Gabriel Alberto Rosas	TKO	4 (6)	30 Mar 2006	Salon 21, Mexico City, Mexico	
5	Win	3–2	Giovanni Caro	MD	6	10 Dec 2005	Arena Coliseo, Monterrey, Mexico	
4	Loss	2–2	Eduardo Becerril	SD	4	26 Aug 2005	Gimnasio de la Nueva Atzacoalco, Mexico City, Mexico	
3	Win	2–1	Crystopher Carlos Martínez	UD	4	30 Jun 2005	Salon 21, Mexico City, Mexico	
2	Win	1–1	Giovanni Caro	KO	1 (4), 1:51	9 Jun 2005	Salon 21, Mexico City, Mexico	
1	Loss	0–1	Diego Armando Santana	KO	2 (4), 2:11	3 Mar 2005	Salon 21, Mexico City, Mexico	
