= Juan Carlos Sánchez Jr. =

Mexican boxer (born 1991)

Personal information
- Born: Juan Carlos Sánchez Terrones; 8 January 1991 (age 35) Los Mochis, Sinaloa, Mexico
- Height: 5 ft 8 1/2 in (174 cm)
- Weight: Super flyweight; Super bantamweight

Boxing career
- Reach: 72 in (183 cm)
- Stance: Orthodox

Boxing record
- Total fights: 31
- Wins: 24
- Win by KO: 11
- Losses: 6
- Draws: 1

Juan Carlos Sánchez Terrones (born 8 January 1991) is a Mexican professional boxer who held the IBF super flyweight title from 2012 to 2013.

== Professional career ==
His first loss was to the undefeated Daniel Rosas in a bout for the vacant WBC CABOFE super flyweight title.

In December 2010, Juan Carlos beat the undefeated Juan Francisco Estrada at the Polideportivo Centenario in Los Mochis, Sinaloa, Mexico.

On 2 February 2012, Sánchez upset Rodrigo Guerrero to win the IBF super flyweight title.

In June 2013, Sánchez lost his world title due to not making weight for his fight against Argentine boxer Roberto Sosa.

== Professional boxing record ==
31 fights	24 wins	6 losses
By knockout	11	3
By decision	13	3
Draws	1	

No.	Result	Record	Opponent	Type	Round, time	Date	Location	Notes
31	Win	24–6–1	(Mexico) Florentino Perez Hernandez	UD	8	2018-07-20	Grand Oasis Arena, Cancún, Mexico	
30	Loss	23–6–1	(Mexico) Carlos Ornelas	UD	8	2017-10-14	Domo del Parque San Rafael, Guadalajara, Mexico	
29	Win	23–5–1	(Mexico) Jose Miguel Tamayo	KO	2 (8)	2017-09-08	Polideportivo Centenario, Los Mochis, Mexico	
28	Win	22–5–1	(Mexico) Ivan Chavelas	KO	4 (10)	2017-06-30	Polideportivo Centenario, Los Mochis, Mexico	
27	Loss	21–5–1	(Mexico) Edivaldo Ortega	UD	10	2016-04-02	Auditorio BB, Mexico City, Mexico	
26	Win	21–4–1	(Philippines) Jhon Gemino	UD	10	2016-01-23	Palenque Fex, Mexicali, Mexico	
25	Loss	20–4–1	(Mexico) Cesar Juarez	UD	12	2015-07-25	Polideportivo Centenario, Los Mochis, Mexico	For vacant WBO International super bantamweight title
24	Win	20–3–1	(Colombia) Luis Melendez	UD	10	2015-03-14	Auditorio Municipal Fausto Gutiérrez Moreno, Tijuana, Mexico	
23	Loss	19–3–1	(South Africa) Zolani Tete	KO	10 (12)	2013-11-30	Mexicali, Mexico	
22	Win	19–2–1	(Nicaragua) Darwin Zamora	TKO	7 (10)	2013-09-21	Crowne Plaza, Managua, Nicaragua	
21	Win	18–2–1	(Argentina) Roberto Sosa	UD	12	2013-06-08	(United States) Hard Rock Hotel and Casino, Las Vegas, Nevada	Lost IBF super flyweight title on the scales.
20	Win	17–2–1	(Philippines) Rodel Mayol	KO	9 (12)	2012–09–22	Gimnasio Polifuncional, Los Mochis, Mexico	Retained IBF super flyweight title.
19	Win	16–2–1	(Mexico) Juan Alberto Rosas	UD	12	2012–05–19	Arena TKT Box Tour, Puerto Vallarta, Mexico	Retained IBF super flyweight title.
18	Win	15–2–1	(Mexico) Rodrigo Guerrero	UD	12	2012–02–11	Arena Unión, Los Mochis, Mexico	Won IBF super flyweight title
17	Loss	14–2–1	(Mexico) Juan Francisco Estrada	TKO	10 (10)	2011-12-17	Arena Jorge Cuesy Serrano, Tuxtla Gutierrez, Mexico	
16	Win	14–1–1	(Mexico) Felipe Salguero	SD	8	2011-12-02	Arena Jorge Cuesy Serrano, Tuxtla Gutierrez, Mexico	
15	Win	13–1–1	(Mexico) Jose Guadalupe Martinez	UD	8	2011-11-19	Estadio Centenario, Los Mochis, Mexico	
14	Win	12–1–1	(Mexico) Juan Francisco Estrada	UD	8	2011–05–14	Polideportivo Centenario, Los Mochis, Mexico	
13	Win	11–1–1	(Mexico) Francisco Soto	UD	6	2010–12–17	Polideportivo Centenario, Los Mochis, Mexico	
12	Win	10–1–1	(Mexico) Valentin León	TD	6 (8)	2010–06–26	Estadio Centenario, Los Mochis, Mexico	
11	Win	9–1–1	(Mexico) René Trujillo	KO	3 (6)	2010–05–29	Sports Center Fair, León, Mexico	
10	Win	8–1–1	(Mexico) Carlos Castro	UD	6	2010–04–10	Palenque de la Feria, Durango, Mexico	
9	Loss	7–1–1	(Mexico) Daniel Rosas	TKO	2 (12)	2010–02–06	Complejo Panamericano, Guadalajara, Mexico	For vacant WBC CABOFE super flyweight title
8	Draw	7–0–1	(Mexico) Felipe Acosta	TD	1 (8)	2009–12–18	Polideportivo Centenario, Los Mochis, Mexico	
7	Win	7–0	(Mexico) René Trujillo	TKO	5 (10)	2009–11–20	Polideportivo Centenario, Los Mochis, Mexico	
6	Win	6–0	(Mexico) Juan Sánchez	TKO	2 (4)	2009–09–04	Polideportivo Centenario, Los Mochis, Mexico	
5	Win	5–0	(Mexico) Jorge Cruz	KO	4 (6)	2009–06–12	Polideportivo Centenario, Los Mochis, Mexico	
4	Win	4–0	(Mexico) Carlos Jacobo	SD	6	2009–04–03	Polideportivo Centenario, Los Mochis, Mexico	
3	Win	3–0	(Mexico) Trinidad Ruiz	KO	1 (4)	2009–03–13	Salón Forum, Los Mochis, Mexico	
2	Win	2–0	(Mexico) Hugo Cruz	TKO	2 (4)	2009–03–06	Polideportivo Centenario, Los Mochis, Mexico	
1	Win	1–0	(Mexico) Raúl Ruiz	TKO	2 (4)	2008–12–19	Polideportivo Centenario, Los Mochis, Mexico	

== See also ==
- List of world super-flyweight boxing champions
- List of Mexican boxing world champions

Sporting positions
World boxing titles
Preceded by Rodrigo Guerrero	IBF Junior bantamweight champion February 11, 2012 – June 7, 2013; Stripped, did not make weight	Vacant Title next held by Daiki Kameda
