= Simphiwe Nongqayi =

South African boxer

Personal information
- Nickname: Golden Master
- Nationality: South African
- Born: 18 February 1972 (age 54) Border Post, Eastern Cape, South Africa
- Height: 5 ft 6 in (1.68 m)
- Weight: Super-flyweight; Junior-featherweight

Boxing career
- Stance: Orthodox

Boxing record
- Total fights: 21
- Wins: 17
- Win by KO: 6
- Losses: 3
- Draws: 1

Simphiwe Nongqayi (born 18 February 1972) is a South African former professional boxer who competed from 2002 to 2012. He held the IBF super-flyweight title from 2009 to 2010 and challenged for the WBO junior-featherweight title in 2011. As an amateur Nongqayi represented South Africa at the 1998 Commonwealth Games.

== Professional career ==
Nongqayi won the vacant IBF super-flyweight title by defeating Jorge Arce on 15 September 2009. He retained the title on 19 April 2010, fighting Malik Bouziane to a majority draw, but then lost the title to Juan Alberto Rosas on 31 July 2010.

Nonggayi suffered a fourth round stoppage loss to Arce on 24 September 2011 in a bout for the WBO junior-featherweight title, and retired from boxing in 2012.

== Professional boxing record ==
21 fights	17 wins	3 losses
By knockout	6	3
By decision	11	0
Draws	1	

No.	Result	Record	Opponent	Type	Round, time	Date	Location	Notes
21	Loss	17–3–1	(South Africa) Thabo Sonjica	TKO	3 (10), 2:24	16 Dec 2012	Orient Theatre, East London, South Africa	
20	Loss	17–2–1	(Mexico) Jorge Arce	TKO	4 (12), 2:01	24 Sep 2011	Auditorio del Estado, Mexicali, Mexico	For WBO junior-featherweight title
19	Loss	17–1–1	(Mexico) Juan Alberto Rosas	TKO	6 (12), 1:00	31 Jul 2010	El Palenque de la Feria, Tepic, Mexico	Lost IBF super-flyweight title
18	Draw	17–0–1	(Algeria) Malik Bouziane	MD	12	9 Apr 2010	Centre Omnisports, Massy, France	Retained IBF super-flyweight title
17	Win	17–0	(Mexico) Jorge Arce	UD	12	15 Sep 2009	Plaza de Toros, Cancún, Mexico	Won vacant IBF super-flyweight title
16	Win	16–0	(Mexico) Francisco Arce	UD	12	28 Feb 2009	Polideportivo Centenario, Los Mochis, Mexico	
15	Win	15–0	(Argentina) Julio David Roque Ler	UD	12	9 May 2008	Nasrec Indoor Arena, Johannesburg, South Africa	Retained WBF (Foundation) super-flyweight title
14	Win	14–0	(Paraguay) Feliciano Dario Azuaga	TKO	5 (12), 1:52	17 Aug 2007	Masizakhe Arena, Carletonville, South Africa	Retained WBF (Foundation) super-flyweight title
13	Win	13–0	(Ecuador) Rafael Tirado	TKO	7 (12), 1:56	11 May 2007	Sasol Recreation Centre, Secunda, South Africa	Retained WBF (Foundation) super-flyweight title
12	Win	12–0	(South Africa) Khulile Makeba	TKO	8 (12), 1:13	15 Dec 2006	Jim Summers Hall, Kimberley, South Africa	Won vacant WBF (Foundation) super-flyweight title
11	Win	11–0	(South Africa) Bonile Ngcingane	UD	8	19 Nov 2005	Orient Theatre, East London, South Africa	
10	Win	10–0	(South Africa) Monwabisi Bayi	UD	8	27 Aug 2005	Orient Theatre, East London, South Africa	
9	Win	9–0	(South Africa) Mangaliso Dyantyi	TKO	4 (8)	22 Jul 2005	Orient Theatre, East London, South Africa	
8	Win	8–0	(South Africa) Nkosana Vaaltein	UD	8	6 May 2005	Centenary Hall, Port Elizabeth, South Africa	
7	Win	7–0	(South Africa) Thozamani Semekazi	TKO	3 (8)	5 Mar 2005	Orient Theatre, East London, South Africa	
6	Win	6–0	(South Africa) Zilindile Kafatyi	UD	8	11 Dec 2004	Orient Theatre, East London, South Africa	
5	Win	5–0	(South Africa) Ayanda Njengele	UD	8	14 Aug 2004	Dordrecht, South Africa	
4	Win	4–0	(South Africa) Wendy Mackenzie	UD	6	24 Apr 2004	Orient Theatre, East London, South Africa	
3	Win	3–0	(South Africa) Memory Bhengu	TKO	3 (6)	22 Nov 2002	Portuguese Hall, Johannesburg, South Africa	
2	Win	2–0	(South Africa) Ezra Gunqisa	UD	6	9 Oct 2002	The Venue, Rivonia, South Africa	
1	Win	1–0	(South Africa) Bongani Thwala	UD	6	14 Sep 2002	Carnival City, Brakpan, South Africa	

Sporting positions
Minor world boxing titles
Vacant Title last held by Gerry Peñalosa	WBF super-flyweight champion 15 Dec 2006 – Dec 2008; Vacated	Title discontinued
Major world boxing titles
Vacant Title last held by Vic Darchinyan	IBF super-flyweight champion 15 Sep 2009 – 31 Jul 2010	Succeeded by Juan Alberto Rosas
