= Border Post, South Africa =

Border Post
- Location within Eastern Cape Location within South Africa
- Coordinates: 32.723°S 27.505°E
- Country: South Africa
- Province: Eastern Cape
- District: Amathole
- Municipality: Amahlathi

Area
  - Total: 5.28 km^{2} (2.04 sq mi)

Population (2011)
  - Total: 3,052
  - Density: 578/km^{2} (1,500/sq mi)

Racial makeup (2011)
  - Black African: 99.8%
  - Coloured: 0.1%
  - Other: 0.1%

First languages (2011)
  - Xhosa: 97.7%
  - Sign language: 1.0%
  - Other: 1.3%
- Time zone: UTC+2 (SAST)

Border Post is a village in Amathole District Municipality in the Eastern Cape province of South Africa.

The name indicates the border post that existed between the former homeland of Ciskei and the Republic of South Africa, during the apartheid years of 1981–1994.

The village has one primary school, Kuhle Primary, which teaches Grade R to 7. When the learners finish primary school they go to high schools in neighboring villages. These include Nompumelelo, Kei Road and Donqaba.

Border Post is home to former WBO and IBF world champion boxer Simphiwe Nongqayi and former Thembisa Classic and Mpumalanga Black Aces FC defender Sibusiso Dabi.
