= Dennis McCann (boxer) =

Irish boxer (born 2001)

Personal information
- Nickname: The Menace
- Born: 8 January 2001 (age 25) London, England
- Height: 5 ft 7 in (170 cm)
- Weight: Super-bantamweight; Featherweight

Boxing career
- Stance: Southpaw

Boxing record
- Total fights: 17
- Wins: 16
- Win by KO: 8
- Draws: 1

Dennis McCann (born 8 January 2001) is a former Irish-British professional boxer who has held the British super-bantamweight title since March 2024 and the Commonwealth title since November 2022. He is also a former European title holder in the same weight division.

== Personal life ==
McCann was born to an Irish Traveller family. His father, cousin and brother were boxers, with the latter being an amateur national champion.

== Professional career ==
=== Early career ===
McCann made his professional debut against Kamil Jaworek on 18 May 2019. In the opening round, McCann landed a body shot which put his opponent on the canvas. Jaworek beat the count, however the bout was ended after McCann scored his second knockdown of the round moments later. On 13 July 2019, McCann fought for the second time as a professional when he came up against Jerson Larios. McCann won via points decision after dominating the entirety of the bout.

On 3 August 2019, McCann fought against Georgi Andonov. McCann won the bout via technical knockout within the opening minute of the first round. McCann faced Georgi Georgiev on 27 September 2019. In the opening round, McCann knocked his opponent down after landing a straight left hand. Georgiev managed to recover from the knockdown, however, McCann soon landed a flurry punches which scored the second knockdown of the bout. In the second round, McCann landed another heavy left hand which knocked Georgiev down for a third time. Despite Georgiev beating the count for a third time, the referee deemed him unable to carry on and waved off the bout.

McCann fought against Stefan Slavchev on 30 November 2019. During round two, he landed a clean right hand which forced Slavchev to retreat into a corner. McCann immediately started to pressure his opponent and landed a number of unanswered punches, after which the referee called an end to the bout in the second round. On 22 February 2020, McCann faced Pablo Narvaez. McCann cruised to a points win after winning every round on the scorecard.

=== Commonwealth champion ===
McCann became Commonwealth super-bantamweight champion by stopping Joe Ham in round eight of their fight for the vacant championship at The O2 Arena in London on 26 November 2022.

=== British champion ===
McCann added the vacant British super-bantamweight title to his collection by defeating the previously unbeaten Brad Strand via unanimous decision at Resorts World Arena in Birmingham on 17 March 2024.

=== European champion ===
McCann won the vacant European super-bantamweight title with a unanimous decision win over Ionut Baluta at The O2 Arena on 27 July 2024.

=== Positive drug test ===
McCann had been scheduled to fight Peter McGrail on 21 December 2024, but the bout was called off eight days beforehand after he tested positive for a banned substance following a test carried out by the Voluntary Anti-Doping Association.

McCann was stripped of his European title in July 2025.

== Professional boxing record ==
17 fights	16 wins	0 losses
By knockout	8	0
By decision	8	0
Draws	1	

No.	Result	Record	Opponent	Type	Round, time	Date	Location	Notes
17	Win	16–0–1	Ionut Baluta	UD	12	27 Jul 2024	O2 Arena, London, England	Won vacant European super-bantamweight title
16	Win	15–0–1	Brad Strand	UD	12	17 Mar 2024	Resorts World Arena, Birmingham, England	Retained Commonwealth super-bantamweight title; Won vacant WBO Inter-Continental and British super-bantamweight titles
15	Draw	14–0–1	Ionut Baluta	TD	9 (12), 3:00	18 Aug 2023	Kings Hall, London, England	For vacant WBO Inter-Continental super-bantamweight title; Majority TD: McCann cut from an accidental head clash
14	Win	14–0	Joe Ham	TKO	8 (12), 2:28	26 Nov 2022	The O2 Arena, London, England	Won vacant Commonwealth super-bantamweight title
13	Win	13–0	James Beech Jr.	TKO	8 (10), 1:44	16 Jul 2022	Copper Box Arena, London, England	Won vacant WBC International Silver featherweight title
12	Win	12–0	Charles Tondo	UD	8	19 Mar 2022	The SSE Arena, London, England	Won vacant WBO Youth super-bantamweight title
11	Win	11–0	Juan Jose Jurado	PTS	8	4 Dec 2021	Copper Box Arena, London, England	
10	Win	10–0	John Chuwa	TKO	2 (8), 2:06	10 Jul 2021	Royal Albert Hall, London, England	
9	Win	9–0	Luis Moreno	PTS	8	26 Mar 2021	Copper Box Arena, London, England	
8	Win	8–0	Pedro Matos	PTS	8	5 Dec 2020	Church House, London, England	
7	Win	7–0	Brett Fidoe	KO	2 (6), 2:06	15 Aug 2020	York Hall, London, England	
6	Win	6–0	Pablo Narvaez	PTS	6	22 Feb 2020	York Hall, London, England	
5	Win	5–0	Stefan Slavchev	TKO	2 (6), 1:47	30 Nov 2019	Utilita Arena, Birmingham, England	
4	Win	4–0	Georgi Georgiev	TKO	2 (6), 2:53	27 Sep 2019	Royal Albert Hall, London, England	
3	Win	3–0	Georgi Andonov	TKO	1 (4), 0:30	3 Aug 2019	Falls Park, Belfast, Northern Ireland	
2	Win	2–0	Jerson Larios	PTS	4	13 Jul 2019	The O2 Arena, London, England	
1	Win	1–0	Kamil Jaworek	TKO	1 (4), 1:44	18 May 2019	Lamex Stadium, Stevenage, England	

Sporting positions
Regional boxing titles
Vacant Title last held by Ricardo Espinoza Franco	WBO Youth super-bantamweight champion 19 March 2022 – present	Incumbent
Vacant Title last held by Louie Lynn	WBC International; Silver featherweight champion 16 July 2022 – 2023; Vacated	Vacant Title next held by Davide Tassi
Vacant Title last held by Zolani Tete	Commonwealth super-bantamweight title 26 November 2022 – present	Incumbent
