= Sakaria Lukas =

Namibian boxer (born 1984)

Personal information
- Nickname: Desert Storm
- Nationality: Namibian
- Born: 4 May 1984 (age 42) Namibia
- Weight: Featherweight

Boxing career

Boxing record
- Total fights: 30
- Wins: 26
- Win by KO: 18
- Losses: 3
- Draws: 1
- No contests: 0

Sakaria Lukas (born 4 May 1984) is a Namibian professional boxer. As an amateur, he competed at the 2010 Commonwealth Games.

== Amateur career ==
A bantamweight, Lukas competed for Namibia at the 2010 Commonwealth Games in the Bantamweight division. In his first match, he beat Joe Ham of Scotland. Following the match, Ham lost consciousness and was treated for a concussion. In Lukas' second match, he was defeated by Botswana's Tirafalo Seoko on points, 11–13.

Lukas began his boxing career in 2006 when he won a gold medal at the Zone 6 Youth Games in Windhoek and a silver medal at the senior Zone 6 championships. He also suffered a knee injury which forced him to take time off from boxing but returned for the 2010 Zone 6 Championships in Johannesburg, where he won a gold medal.

== Professional boxing record ==
29 fights	26 wins	2 losses
By knockout	18	1
By decision	8	1
Draws	1	

No.	Result	Record	Opponent	Type	Round, time	Date	Location	Notes
29	Win	26–2–1	(Zimbabwe) Patson Mutengwa	KO	1 (6), 2:30	14 Oct 2023	Windhoek Sports Club, Windhoek, Namibia	
28	Loss	25–2–1	(United States) Raymond Ford	KO	8 (10), 2:20	12 Nov 2022	(United States) Rocket Mortgage FieldHouse, Cleveland, Ohio, US	
27	Draw	25–1–1	(Mongolia) Tugstsogt Nyambayar	SD	10	22 Jan 2022	(United States) Borgata Hotel Casino, Atlantic City, New Jersey, US	
26	Win	25–1	(Mexico) Marco Alejandro Chable	MD	8	19 Mar 2021	Complejo 360, Cancún, Mexico	
25	Win	24–1	(Mexico) Mario Antonio Macias	KO	2 (6)	26 Feb 2021	Hotel Canopy Hilton, Cancún, Mexico	
24	Loss	23–1	(Mexico) Isaac Avelar	UD	10	5 Dec 2020	(United States) AT&T Stadium, Arlington, Texas, U.S.	
23	Win	23–0	(Malawi) Raston Kayira	KO	3 (8), 1:45	6 Dec 2019	After school centre, Windhoek, Namibia	
22	Win	22–0	(Zimbabwe) Ndodana Ncube	KO	8 (10)	10 May 2019	Showground Rajivh Ghandi Hall, Harare, Zimbabwe	
21	Win	21–0	(South Africa) Tello Dithebe	UD	12	2 Dec 2017	Windhoek Country Club Resort, Windhoek, Namibia	Retained WBO Africa featherweight title
20	Win	20–0	(Uganda) Mudde Robinson Ntambi	KO	3 (12), 2:59	9 Sep 2017	Windhoek Country Club Resort, Windhoek, Namibia	Retained WBO Africa featherweight title
19	Win	19–0	(South Africa) Oscar Chauke	UD	12	1 Apr 2017	Ramatex Factory, Windhoek, Namibia	Retained WBO Africa featherweight title
18	Win	18–0	(Tanzania) Mohammed Kambuluta	TKO	5 (12)	8 Oct 2016	Windhoek Country Club Resort, Windhoek, Namibia	Retained interim WBO Africa featherweight title
17	Win	17–0	(Tanzania) Mohammed Matumla	KO	4 (12)	11 Jun 2016	Ramatex Factory, Windhoek, Namibia	Won interim WBO Africa featherweight title
16	Win	16–0	(Namibia) Nathaniel Kamati	KO	5 (12)	3 Oct 2015	Windhoek Country Club Resort, Windhoek, Namibia	Won vacant WBA Pan African featherweight title
15	Win	15–0	(Tanzania) Issa Nampepeche	TKO	7 (12)	25 Apr 2015	Windhoek Country Club Resort, Windhoek, Namibia	Won vacant IBF Continental Africa featherweight title
14	Win	14–0	(South Africa) Koos Matshiya	KO	4 (8)	6 Dec 2014	Windhoek Country Club Resort, Windhoek, Namibia	
13	Win	13–0	(Namibia) Tommy Nakashimba	TKO	7 (10)	26 Jul 2014	Windhoek Country Club Resort, Windhoek, Namibia	Retained Namibian featherweight titles
12	Win	12–0	(Namibia) Immanuel Andeleki	TKO	1 (6), 1:37	17 May 2014	Omuthiya Park, Oshikoto, Namibia	
11	Win	11–0	(Democratic Republic of the Congo) Tekesha Ilunga	UD	6	1 Mar 2014	Olufuko Centre, Outapi, Namibia	
10	Win	10–0	(South Africa) Thembani Hobyani	UD	10	11 Oct 2013	Windhoek Country Club Resort, Windhoek, Namibia	
9	Win	9–0	(Zambia) Emmanuel Simbeye	KO	1 (6)	7 Sep 2013	Oshikango Shopping Centre, Oshikango, Namibia	
8	Win	8–0	(Namibia) Joseph Katenda	RTD	5 (10), 3:00	11 May 2013	Kuisebmond Community Hall, Walvis Bay, Namibia	Won interim Namibian featherweight title
7	Win	7–0	(Zambia) Fidelis Lupupa	KO	1 (6), 2:59	20 Mar 2013	Windhoek Country Club Resort, Windhoek, Namibia	
6	Win	6–0	(Zimbabwe) Ndumiso Tshabangu	KO	1 (4), 1:40	3 Nov 2012	Windhoek Country Club Resort, Windhoek, Namibia	
5	Win	5–0	(Namibia) David Egumbo	TKO	2 (4)	8 Sep 2012	Windhoek Country Club Resort, Windhoek, Namibia	
4	Win	4–0	(Namibia) Matheus Johannes	PTS	4	8 Jun 2012	Windhoek Country Club Resort, Windhoek, Namibia	
3	Win	3–0	(Namibia) Lazarus Namalambo	UD	4	20 Mar 2012	Windhoek Country Club Resort, Windhoek, Namibia	
2	Win	2–0	(Namibia) Erick Kalenga	KO	3 (4)	11 Jun 2011	Windhoek Country Club Resort, Windhoek, Namibia	
1	Win	1–0	(Namibia) Costa Nilo Frans	UD	4	19 Mar 2011	Windhoek Country Club Resort, Windhoek, Namibia	
