= Brad Strand =

English boxer (born 1997)

Personal information
- Born: 4 March 1997 (age 29) Liverpool, England
- Weight: Super-bantamweight

Boxing career
- Stance: Orthodox

Boxing record
- Total fights: 16
- Wins: 14
- Win by KO: 5
- Losses: 2

Brad Strand (born 4 March 1997) is an English professional boxer who is a former WBO European super-bantamweight champion. He has also challenged for the British and Commonwealth titles in the same weight division.

== Amateur career ==
Boxing out of Everton Red Triangle in Liverpool, Strand was a four-time English national champion and won the 2018 England Boxing National Amateur Championships.

== Professional career ==
Having turned professional in 2018, Strand won his first two pro-fights, before signing a promotional contract with Frank Warren's Queensbury Promotions in 2020.

Unbeaten after 10 bouts in the paid ranks, he claimed the vacant WBO European super-bantamweight title with a unanimous decision win over Joshua John at York Hall in London on 1 December 2023.

Strand challenged Commonwealth super-bantamweight champion Dennis McCann at Resorts World Arena in Birmingham on 16 March 2024, with the vacant British title also on the line. He lost via unanimous decision.

In his next fight, he got back to winning ways by knocking out Marvin Solano in the sixth of their scheduled eight-round contest at Liverpool Arena on 5 October 2024.

Returning to the same venue on 15 March 2025, Strand attempted to become a two-time WBO European super-bantamweight champion when he took on Ionut Baluta for the vacant title. He lost by split decision with one ringside judge scoring the contest 97–93 in his favour while the other two ruled it 98–91 and 96–94 respectively for his opponent.
