= Rodrigo Guerrero (boxer) =

Mexican boxer

Personal information
- Nickname: Gatito
- Born: 10 January 1988 (age 38) Mexico City, Mexico
- Height: 1.69 m (5 ft 7 in)
- Weight: Bantamweight; Super flyweight

Boxing career
- Reach: 175 cm (69 in)
- Stance: Southpaw

Boxing record
- Total fights: 33
- Wins: 25
- Win by KO: 16
- Losses: 6
- Draws: 2
- No contests: 0

Rodrigo Guerrero (born 10 January 1988) is a Mexican professional boxer who held the IBF super flyweight title from 2011 to 2012.

== Professional career ==
In July 2008, Guerrero defeated Juan Alberto Rosas to win the WBC Continental Americas bantamweight title.

On 8 October 2011 Guerrero upset Raúl Martínez to win the IBF super flyweight title.

== See also ==
- List of Mexican boxing world champions
- List of IBF world champions
- List of super flyweight boxing champions

Achievements
Vacant Title last held by Cristian Mijares	IBF Junior Bantamweight Champion; October 8, 2011 – February 11, 2012	Succeeded by Juan Carlos Sánchez, Jr.
