= Dennis McCann (theologian) =

Dennis P. McCann is an American theologian and academic who is the Wallace M. Alston Professor of Bible and Religion at Agnes Scott College in Atlanta/Decatur, Georgia, where he teaches in the fields of religious social ethics, comparative religious ethics, philosophy of religion, and Catholic studies. Before his tenure at Agnes Scott College beginning in 1999, McCann was Professor of Religious Studies at DePaul University in Chicago. In 1992 he was named the first annual holder of the Wicklander Chair in Business and Professional Ethics at DePaul University.

== Biography ==
Dennis McCann is director of research at Rothlin International management Consulting, Beijing, China. He was the director of the Case Study Institute at the Center for International Business Ethics at the University of International Business and Economics in Beijing. McCann received his Licentiate of Sacred Theology (S.T.L.) from the Gregorian University in Rome in 1971, and a Ph.D. in Theology from the University of Chicago Divinity School in 1976. His publications include Christian Realism and Liberation Theology (Orbis Books, 1981), and New Experiment in Democracy: The Challenge for American Catholicism (Sheed and Ward, 1987). Along with Charles R. Strain, he authored Polity and Praxis: A Program for American Practical Theology (Winston/Seabury, 1985; reprinted by the University Press of America, 1990). With Max Stackhouse and Shirley Roels, he edited an anthology of materials for teaching business ethics within an ecumenically Christian perspective, On Moral Business: Classical and Contemporary Resources for Ethics and Economics (1995), published by Eerdmans Press. His most recent book, co-edited with Patrick D. Miller, In Search of the Common Good, was published in March 2005 by T and T Clark/ Trinity International Press.

From 1996 until 2001, McCann served as the executive director of the Society of Christian Ethics (SCE). He has served on the board of directors of the SCE (1989-1992), and the editorial board of The Journal of Religious Ethics (1981-1996).

McCann has extensive academic experience in Hong Kong, China, the Philippines, Malaysia, Japan, Thailand, Indonesia, India and other countries in east Asia. In 1998 McCann was the Au Yeung King Fong University Fellow at the Centre for Applied Ethics at Hong Kong Baptist University, where he did research on East Asian business ethics within the framework of comparative religious ethics. He maintains an ongoing relationship with Hong Kong Baptist University's Centre for Applied Ethics, where he is an “Affiliated Fellow.”

He has presented papers at academic conferences twice in Hong Kong, twice in Beijing and once in Nanjing. He has lectured on “Case Study Method and Business Ethics” at Assumption University in Bangkok, Thailand, on “Ethics and Economics” at the School of Economics at Beida University in Beijing, China, on “Christian Culture and Modernity: A Postmodern Perspective” at Capital Normal University, in Beijing, and on “Religions in America: The Challenge of Religious and Cultural Pluralism after 9-11” at the Chinese Academy of the Social Sciences, also in Beijing. McCann also serves as an adjunct professor in the University Dubuque Asian MBA Program, in which he has taught the course in business ethics to MBA students in Singapore (1996), Kuala Lumpur (1997, 2001), and Hong Kong (1998).

In June, 2003 McCann was the ASC representative to Kinjo Gakuin University in Nagoya, Japan, as part of the ongoing ASC-Kinjo Gakuin faculty exchange program, where he lectured on “Intellectual Property Rights: A Case Study in Cross-Cultural Business Ethics.”

In August 2003 McCann began a new project, cosponsored by the USPES organization, investigating the meaning and practice of business ethics among Chinese Christian executives in Silicon Valley where he has so far done 34 in-depth interviews. He has presented a preliminary report on his findings to the Agnes Scott faculty in a March 2004 lecture, “Business Ethics: Chinese AND Christian.”

In August 2004, McCann was the recipient of a Fulbright Summer Travel Fellowship that allowed him to join a group of professors organized by the University of Louisiana at Lafayette for a month of travel/study of China's economic and social development in Gansu and Xinjiang Provinces as well as in the rapidly modernizing major cities of east China: Beijing, Shanghai, Suzhou, and Guangzhou.

McCann was the Fulbright Scholar in Residence at the Hong Kong America Center and visiting professor in the Department of Management at Chinese University of Hong Kong during the 2005–2006 academic year. At the HKAC he served as the Director of Research and Development, and in that capacity he focused on developing HKAC programs in the areas of religion and society, as well as cross-cultural and international business ethics.

In 2006-2008 McCann was granted a two-year leave by Agnes Scott College in order to assume a position as visiting professor in the Department of Religion and Philosophy at Hong Kong Baptist University. In that capacity he taught philosophical subjects in the undergraduate complementary studies program, including “Applied Ethics” and “Business, Ethics and Society,” as well as various subjects related to religious ethics in the BA honours program in religion and philosophy. He also developed and taught an innovative interdisciplinary class, “On Globalization,” in and for the MALSE program at HKBU.

Academic Degrees:
A.B. St. Charles Borromeo Seminary
S.T.L. Gregorian University (Rome, Italy)
M.A. University of Chicago Divinity School
Ph.D. University of Chicago Divinity School

== Selected publications ==
=== Recent Books ===
- New Experiment in Democracy: The Challenge for American Catholicism, Sheed & Ward (February 1987)
- Polity and Praxis, University Press of America (August 1, 1990)
- On Moral Business: Classical and Contemporary Resources for Ethics in Economic Life, Wm. B. Eerdmans Publishing Co. (September 5, 1995)
- Christian Realism and Liberation Theology: Practical Theologies in Creative Conflict, Wipf & Stock Pub (August 30, 2001)
- International Business Ethics. Focus on China, (with Stephan Rothlin) Springer, (2016)
