= Zolani Tete =

South African boxer (1988–2026)

- Tete in 2019

Personal information
- Nickname: Last Born
- Born: 8 March 1988 Mdantsane, Cape Province, South Africa
- Died: 21 August 2026 (aged 38) Mdantsane, Eastern Cape, South Africa
- Height: 5 ft 9 in (175 cm)
- Weight: Flyweight; Super-flyweight; Bantamweight; Super-bantamweight

Boxing career
- Reach: 72 in (183 cm)
- Stance: Southpaw

Boxing record
- Total fights: 34
- Wins: 29
- Win by KO: 22
- Losses: 4
- No contests: 1

Zolani Tete (8 March 1988 – 21 August 2026) was a South African professional boxer who competed from 2006 to 2022. He was a two-weight world champion, having held the International Boxing Federation (IBF) junior-bantamweight title from 2014 to 2015 and the World Boxing Organization (WBO) bantamweight title from 2017 to 2019.

Tete held the Guinness World Record for the fastest knockout in a title fight in boxing history, knocking out Siboniso Gonya in eleven seconds of the opening round.

Tete was shot and killed outside his home in Mdantsane on 21 August 2026, aged 38.

== Early life and amateur career ==
Tete grew up in Mdantsane township and he had a rough childhood. His father Zolile Tete is a pastor. He and his brother, Makazole, took up boxing when Zolani was eight. He looked up to South African former world champions Vuyani Bungu and Welcome Ncita while in the unpaid ranks.

Zolani Tete was later trained by Bungu. Tete claimed to have had over 400 amateur bouts, only three of which were losses. As an amateur he fought Hekkie Budler former WBA world minifly and WBA and IBF World junior flyweight champion and The Ring champ twice in the South African national games. Tete won one and lost one to Hekkie.

== Professional career ==
=== Flyweight ===
Tete made his professional debut in May 2006, winning his first eight fights by stoppage. In his eighth bout he won the WBF flyweight title, which he defended twice. Tete earned a shot at a major world title for the first time, beating Richard Garcia in a title eliminator by unanimous decision (118–108, 118–108, 118–110). Tete went on to face Moruti Mthalane for the IBF flyweight title, suffering his first loss with a round 5 technical knockout (TKO).

=== Junior bantamweight ===
After the loss to Mthalane, Tete moved up to junior-bantamweight. He received an opportunity to fight in an IBF eliminator, but lost a majority decision (112–115, 112–115, 113–113) to Juan Alberto Rosas. After a bounce-back win, Tete fought in yet another eliminator but lost by split decision (113–115, 114–115, 115–114) to Roberto Sosa. Tete seemed to befuddle Sosa with his length early on, but as the fight went on Sosa surged and earned the nod. Sosa received a warning due to low blows but there were not any point deductions made.

In November 2013, Tete fought in a third IBF junior-bantamweight eliminator against former champion Juan Carlos Sánchez Jr. Sánchez had lost the IBF title due to coming in overweight against Sosa, thus leaving the title vacant after beating Sosa. The winner would be the IBF's mandatory challenger to the winner of the Liborio Solís-Daiki Kameda unification bout. Tete knocked down Sánchez in round five before being dropped himself in round six. After being knocked down, Tete resorted to excessive holding, losing points in rounds eight and nine. However, he was able to put Sánchez away in round ten.

==== Tete vs. Kinoshita ====
Solís beat Kameda, but he also lost his title on the scales, leaving the IBF title vacant. Tete faced Teiru Kinoshita in July 2014 for the vacant title, winning a comfortable unanimous decision (119–109, 119–109, 118–110). After one successful defence, he chose to vacate the title rather than fight mandatory challenger McJoe Arroyo. Tete went on to sign with British promoter Frank Warren in December 2015.

=== Bantamweight ===
Tete made his bantamweight debut in 2016. In his third fight in the division in 2017, Tete claimed the WBO interim by beating Arthur Villanueva. Tete won a wide unanimous decision (120–107, 119–108, 119–108), dropping Villanueva in round eleven. Tete was later elevated to full champion by the WBO.

==== Tete vs. Gonya, fastest knockout in a title fight ====
In his first defense of his title on 18 November 2017, Tete fought against challenger Siboniso Gonya at the SSE Arena in Belfast, Northern Ireland. Tete in the first five seconds of the opening round, landed his first and only punch of the fight on Gonya with a right hook, knocking the challenger out cold before the fight was stopped by the eleventh second.

The knockout win not only allowed Tete to retain the title, but it also broke the previous record set by Daniel Jiménez's 17-second knockout of Harald Geier on 3 September 1994, which held the record for 8,477 days prior to Tete's bout. Tete's feat was later registered in the Guinness World Records and still holds the record as of 2026.

==== Tete vs. Narvaez ====
On 21 April 2018, Tete defended his WBO belt against Omar Narvaez, who was WBO #1 ranked contender at the time. In a highly unexciting bout, Tete still managed to get a unanimous decision victory, winning 120–108 on all three scorecards.

==== Tete vs. Aloyan ====
In his next title defense, Tete faced Mikhail Aloyan, ranked #5 by the WBA and #6 by the WBO. Tete won the fight on all three scorecards, 114–111, 114–111, and 114–110.

==== Tete vs. Donaire cancellation ====
Tete was scheduled to face Nonito Donaire on 27 April 2019, but pulled out of the fight due to a shoulder injury.

==== Tete vs. Casimero ====
In his next bout, Tete fought former world champion John Riel Casimero. Casimero dropped Tete twice before the referee waved the fight off in the third round and awarded Casimero the TKO win.

== Doping ban ==
In August 2023, Tete was given a four-year ban for an anti-doping rule violation after testing positive for stanozolol. The ban ended on 29 July 2026.

== Death ==
On 21 August 2026, Tete was shot to death outside of his home in his hometown of Mdantsane after being ambushed by two armed men wearing balaclavas. His female companion was also wounded and was taken to hospital. In the days following the attack, multiple arrests were made by the Eastern Cape police but further details of the case were not immediately announced as the investigation was said to be sensitive.

By 18 September 2026 four men were charged in a conspiracy to murder Tate and were denied bail. A fifth member on the conspiracy is believed to be still be at large. Uzuzole Goqwana is accused of masterminding the murder with Sinebhongo Qase accused of acting as a middleman by hiring Athandwa Gandala and Siphesihle Kolisa as hitmen who allegedly carried out the shooting. Goqwana is paralyzed from the waist down and wheelchair bound from a previous shooting in July 2025 where Tete's estranged wife, Thulisa was also shot.

== Professional boxing record ==
34 fights	29 wins	4 losses
By knockout	22	2
By decision	7	2
No contests	1	

No.	Result	Record	Opponent	Type	Round, time	Date	Location	Notes
34	NC	29–4 (1)	Jason Cunningham	KO	4 (12)	2 Jul 2022	Wembley Arena, Wembley, England, U.K.	Originally a KO win for Tete, but changed to a no contest due to a failed drug test; For Commonwealth, IBF, & vacant WBO International super-bantamweight titles
33	Win	29–4	Iddi Kayumba	KO	1 (10), 0:55	12 Dec 2021	Booysens Boxing Club, Johannesburg, South Africa	
32	Loss	28–4	John Riel Casimero	TKO	3 (12), 2:14	30 Nov 2019	Arena Birmingham, Birmingham, England, U.K.	Lost WBO bantamweight title
31	Win	28–3	Mikhail Aloyan	UD	12	13 Oct 2018	Expo Center, Yekaterinburg, Russia	Retained WBO bantamweight title; World Boxing Super Series: bantamweight quarter-final
30	Win	27–3	Omar Narváez	UD	12	21 Apr 2018	SSE Arena, Belfast, Northern Ireland, U.K.	Retained WBO bantamweight title
29	Win	26–3	Siboniso Gonya	TKO	1 (12), 0:11	18 Nov 2017	SSE Arena, Belfast, Northern Ireland, U.K.	Retained WBO bantamweight title
28	Win	25–3	Arthur Villanueva	UD	12	22 Apr 2017	Leicester Arena, Leicester, England, U.K.	Won WBO interim bantamweight title
27	Win	24–3	Victor Ruiz	TKO	7 (12), 0:50	4 Jun 2016	Echo Arena, Liverpool, England, U.K.	Won IBF International bantamweight title
26	Win	23–3	José Santos González	TKO	7 (12), 2:37	12 Mar 2016	Echo Arena, Liverpool, England, U.K.	
25	Win	22–3	Jether Oliva	UD	12	19 Dec 2015	Orient Theatre, East London, South Africa	Won vacant WBO Africa junior-bantamweight title
24	Win	21–3	Diuhl Olguín	TKO	8 (10), 1:52	4 Sep 2015	Orient Theatre, East London, South Africa	
23	Win	20–3	Paul Butler	TKO	8 (12), 1:34	6 Mar 2015	Echo Arena, Liverpool, England, U.K.	Retained IBF junior-bantamweight title
22	Win	19–3	Teiru Kinoshita	UD	12	18 Jul 2014	Portopia Hotel, Kobe, Japan	Won vacant IBF junior-bantamweight title
21	Win	18–3	Juan Carlos Sánchez Jr.	KO	10 (12), 2:43	30 Nov 2013	Auditorio del Estado, Mexicali, Mexico	
20	Win	17–3	Eduard Penerio	KO	1 (8), 2:37	23 Mar 2013	Carnival City Casino, Brakpan, South Africa	
19	Loss	16–3	Roberto Sosa	SD	12	1 Sep 2012	Polideportivo Municipal, Córdoba, Argentina	
18	Win	16–2	Siphiwo Ntsangani	KO	1 (8), 0:34	30 Mar 2012	Orient Theatre, East London, South Africa	
17	Loss	15–2	Juan Alberto Rosas	MD	12	26 Nov 2011	Plaza de Toros, Mazatlán, Mexico	
16	Win	15–1	Olebogeng Motseki	TKO	7 (8), 2:24	11 Jun 2011	Carnival City, Brakpan, South Africa	
15	Win	14–1	Sipho Nkadimeng	KO	1 (8), 2:20	17 Dec 2010	Gompo Hall, East London, South Africa	
14	Loss	13–1	Moruti Mthalane	TKO	5 (12), 2:27	1 Sep 2010	Carnival City, Brakpan, South Africa	For IBF flyweight title
13	Win	13–0	Richard Garcia	UD	12	26 Feb 2010	Wembley Stadium, Johannesburg, South Africa	
12	Win	12–0	Anthony Mathias	KO	1 (12), 2:38	20 Nov 2009	Wembley Stadium, Johannesburg, South Africa	Won vacant WBO Africa flyweight title
11	Win	11–0	Rexon Flores	KO	1 (10), 0:28	29 Mar 2009	Orient Theatre, East London, South Africa	
10	Win	10–0	Francis Miyeyusho	TKO	1 (12), 2:24	29 Jun 2008	Orient Theatre, East London, South Africa	Retained WBF flyweight title
9	Win	9–0	Xolani Ntese	UD	12	30 Mar 2008	Orient Theatre, East London, South Africa	Retained WBF flyweight title
8	Win	8–0	Vicky Tahumil	RTD	4 (12), 3:00	23 Sep 2007	Orient Theatre, East London, South Africa	Won vacant WBF flyweight title
7	Win	7–0	Wiseman Kega	KO	1 (6)	1 Apr 2007	Orient Theatre, East London, South Africa	
6	Win	6–0	Vuyo Toyise	KO	1 (6), 1:30	4 Mar 2007	Orient Theatre, East London, South Africa	
5	Win	5–0	Zukile Toko	TKO	5 (6)	9 Dec 2006	Indoor Centre, Mdantsane, South Africa	
4	Win	4–0	Mthutuzeli Funde	TKO	1 (6), 1:44	7 Oct 2006	Orient Theatre, East London, South Africa	
3	Win	3–0	Xolile Ngemntu	TKO	1 (6), 0:10	19 Aug 2006	Orient Theatre, East London, South Africa	
2	Win	2–0	Thembinkosi Tywantsi	TKO	1 (4), 0:52	22 Jul 2006	Orient Theatre, East London, South Africa	
1	Win	1–0	Andile Solani	TKO	1 (4), 1:39	27 May 2006	Orient Theatre, East London, South Africa	

== Titles in boxing ==
=== Major world titles ===
- IBF junior-bantamweight champion (115 lbs)
- WBO bantamweight champion (118 lbs)

=== Interim world titles ===
- WBO interim bantamweight champion (118 lbs)

=== Minor world titles ===
- WBF flyweight champion (112 lbs)

=== Regional/International titles ===
- WBO Africa flyweight champion (112 lbs)
- WBO Africa junior-bantamweight champion (115 lbs)
- IBF International bantamweight champion (118 lbs)

== See also ==
- List of southpaw stance boxers
- List of world super-flyweight boxing champions
- List of world bantamweight boxing champions

Sporting positions
Regional boxing titles
New title	WBO Africa flyweight champion 20 November 2009 – 2009; Vacated	Vacant Title next held by Abmerk Shindjuu
Vacant Title last held by Muvhuso Nedzanani	WBO Africa junior-bantamweight champion 18 December 2015 – 2016; Vacated	Vacant Title next held by Athenkosi Dumezweni
Vacant Title last held by Immanuel Naidjala	IBF International bantamweight champion 12 March 2016 – 2016; Vacated	Vacant
Minor World boxing titles
New title	WBF flyweight champion 23 September 2007 – 2008; Vacated	Vacant
Major World boxing titles
Vacant Title last held by Daiki Kameda	IBF junior-bantamweight champion 18 July 2014 – 7 June 2015; Vacated	Vacant Title next held by McJoe Arroyo
Vacant Title last held by Alejandro Hernández	WBO bantamweight champion Interim title 22 April – 23 April 2017; Promoted	Vacant Title next held by John Riel Casimero
Preceded by Marlon Tapales; Stripped	WBO bantamweight champion 23 April 2017 – 30 November 2019	Succeeded by John Riel Casimero
Records
Preceded by Daniel Jiménez vs. Harald Geier; 17 seconds	Fastest knockout in a title bout 11 seconds vs. Siboniso Gonya; November 18, 2017 – present	Incumbent
Junior bantamweight status
Preceded by Robert Quiroga	Latest born world champion to die August 21, 2025 – present	Incumbent
Bantamweight status
Preceded by Johnny Tapia	Latest born world champion to die August 21, 2025 – present	Incumbent
Status (all weights)
Preceded by Moises Fuentes	Latest born world champion to die August 21, 2025 – present	Incumbent
