= Manju Wanniarachchi =

Sri Lankan boxer

Personal information
- Full name: Manju Dinesh Kumara Wanniarachchi
- Nickname: "Manju"
- Nationality: Sri Lankan
- Born: 2 December 1979 (age 46) Kandy, Sri Lanka
- Height: 5 ft 3 in (1.60 m)

Sport
- Club: Slimline Boxing Club

Manju Dinesh Kumara Wanniarachchi (Sinhala: මංජු දිනේෂ් කුමාර වන්නිආරච්චි) (born 2 December 1979) is a Sri Lankan amateur boxer. He won a gold medal at the 2010 Commonwealth Games in the bantamweight category, defeating Sean McGoldrick in the final, but was later stripped of his medal after failing a drug test. He is an old boy of Vidyartha College, Kandy.

== Drugs ==
On 24 October 2010 National Olympic Committee of Sri Lanka announced that Wanniarachchi had passed a drug test taken during the Commonwealth Games. A urine sample provided by the boxer had contained viagra, a banned performance-enhancing drug. Wanniarachchi claims he passed the drug test due to the headache medication he was taking. Wanniarachchi subsequently failed the second doping test for a banned steroid. The Amateur Boxing Association of Sri Lanka said the "B" sample of 30-year-old Wanniarachchi's urine tested positive for nandrolone, a performance-enhancing substance. Wanniarachchi announced his intention to launch an appeal.

Wanniarachchi was suspended from all boxing meets by the National Anti Doping Organization of Sri Lanka in March 2011. The Commonwealth Games Federation stripped Wanniarachchi of his gold medal on 8 May 2011 after a meeting of Federation Court in Kuala Lumpur, Malaysia. On 23 May 2011, Wanniarachchi announced he was retiring from boxing. After the lapse of the appeal period, McGoldrick was awarded the gold medal on 6 June 2011.

== See also ==
- List of Sri Lankans by sport
