= Jing Xiang (boxer) =

Chinese boxer (born 1989)

Personal information
- Nationality: Chinese
- Born: 23 December 1989 (age 36) Changsha, China
- Height: 5 ft 3 in (160 cm)
- Weight: Mini-flyweight; Light-flyweight; Flyweight; Super-flyweight

Boxing career
- Reach: 63 in (160 cm)
- Stance: Orthodox

Boxing record
- Total fights: 23
- Wins: 17
- Win by KO: 3
- Losses: 4
- Draws: 2

Jing Xiang (born 23 December 1989) is a Chinese professional boxer who has held the WBO International mini-flyweight title since 2019.

== Professional career ==
Xiang made his professional debut on 3 December 2010, scoring a ten-round majority decision (MD) victory over Elmar Francisco at the Tianjin Sports Arena in Tianjin, China, capturing the vacant WBO Youth junior-bantamweight title.

After losing his next fight in August 2011 by unanimous decision (UD) against future world champion Jerwin Ancajas, he scored two UD wins against Anintachai Somnuek in November 2011 and June 2012. After his rematch with Somnuek he suffered the second defeat of his career against Ippei Aoki the following September, before facing Morakot CP Freshmart for the WBC Youth flyweight title. The bout took place on 12 March 2013 at the Big C Shopping Center in Bangkok, Thailand. Xiang suffered his second consecutive defeat and the third of his career, losing by UD. One judge scored the bout 97–93 while the other two scored it 96–94.

He bounced back from defeat with four wins, one by knockout (KO), before fighting to a majority draw against Yukiya Hanabusa in April 2014. In his next fight he fought to a split draw against Ben Mananquil on 25 July at the Central South University of Forestry and Technology in Changsha, China, with the vacant WBO Asia Pacific flyweight title on the line. Xiang fought Mananquil in an immediate rematch on 27 December in Haikou, China, defeating Mananquil via split decision (SD) to capture the vacant WBO Asia Pacific title. Xiang lost the title in his first defence, suffering a third-round technical knockout (TKO) defeat to Macrea Gandionco on 8 May 2015.

Following his fourth defeat, he faced Joel Taduran on 24 June 2016 at the Guangxi Sports Center Gymnasium in Nanning, China. Xiang defeated Taduran by UD to capture the vacant WBO Oriental interim flyweight title, with the judges' scorecards reading 99–91, 98–92 and 97–93. After being elevated to full WBO Oriental champion, Xiang made his first defence against Joy Joy Formentera, successfully retaining his title via UD on 10 December 2016 at the Hangzhou Stadium in Hangzhou, China. Two judges scored the bout 98–92 while the third scored it 97–93.

After three more wins in non-title fights, two by stoppage, he moved down in weight to defeat Dexter Alimento on 20 January 2018 at the Shenzhen Bao'an District Sports Center in Shenzhen, China, capturing the vacant WBO Inter-Continental light-flyweight title via UD.

In his next fight he defeated Merlito Sabillo on 15 September 2018 at the Qinzhou Sports Center Gymnasium in Qinzhou, China, capturing the vacant WBC Silver light-flyweight title by UD. He retained the title in his next fight by UD against former world champion Suriyan Satorn in January 2019.

After moving down in weight again, he faced Jomar Caindog for the vacant WBO International mini-flyweight title on 17 August 2019 at the Shenzhen Bao'an District Sports Center. After an accidental clash of heads in the eighth round left Caindog with a cut below his right eye, the contest was halted by the referee, with the decision going to the judges' scorecards. One judge scored the bout 79–73 and the other two scored it 77–75, all in favour of Xiang, awarding him the WBO International title via eighth-round technical decision (TD).

== Professional boxing record ==
23 fights	17 wins	4 losses
By knockout	3	1
By decision	14	3
Draws	2	

No.	Result	Record	Opponent	Type	Round, time	Date	Location	Notes
23	Win	17–4–2	(Philippines) Jomar Caindog	TD	8 (12), 2:10	17 Aug 2019	Shenzhen Bao'an Districts Sports Centre, Shenzhen, China	Won vacant WBO International mini-flyweight title; Unanimous TD after Caindog cut from accidental head clash
22	Win	16–4–2	(Thailand) Suriyan Satorn	UD	12	5 Jan 2019	Suzhou Olympic Sports Centre, Suzhou, China	Retained WBC Silver light-flyweight title
21	Win	15–4–2	(Philippines) Merlito Sabillo	UD	12	15 Sep 2018	Qinzhou Sports Center Gymnasium, Qinzhou, China	Won vacant WBC Silver light-flyweight title
20	Win	14–4–2	(Philippines) Dexter Alimento	UD	10	20 Jan 2018	Shenzhen Bao'an District Sports Center, Shenzhen, China	Won vacant WBO Inter-Continental light-flyweight title
19	Win	13–4–2	(Thailand) Natthapol Wongzuy	TKO	2 (6)	29 Sep 2017	Singmanassak Muaythai School, Pathum Thani, Thailand	
18	Win	12–4–2	(Thailand) Wichai Somphong	KO	2 (6), 1:49	14 Sep 2017	Ram 100 Thai Boxing Stadium, Bangkok, Thailand	
17	Win	11–4–2	(Philippines) Rollen Del Castillo	UD	8	29 Jan 2017	Cotai Arena, Macau, SAR	
16	Win	10–4–2	(Philippines) Joy Joy Formentera	UD	10	10 Dec 2016	Hangzhou Stadium, Hangzhou, China	Retained WBO Oriental flyweight title
15	Win	9–4–2	(Philippines) Joel Taduran	UD	10	24 Jun 2016	Guangxi Sports Center, Nanning, China	Won vacant WBO interim Oriental flyweight title
14	Loss	8–4–2	(Philippines) Macrea Gandionco	TKO	3 (10), 1:42	8 May 2015	EXPO Garden Hotel, Kunming, China	Lost WBO Asia Pacific flyweight title
13	Win	8–3–2	(Philippines) Ben Mananquil	SD	12	27 Dec 2014	Haikou, China	Won vacant WBO Asia Pacific flyweight title
12	Draw	7–3–2	(Philippines) Ben Mananquil	SD	12	25 Jul 2014	Central South University of Forestry and Technology, Changsha, China	
11	Draw	7–3–1	(Japan) Yukiya Hanabusa	MD	6	13 Apr 2014	Sangyo Hall, Kanazawa, Japan	
10	Win	7–3	(Indonesia) Ricky Manufoe	UD	8	5 Feb 2014	City Hall, Haikou, China	
9	Win	6–3	(Indonesia) Samuel Tehuayo	UD	8	16 Nov 2013	Yu Hang Gymnasium, Hangzhou, China	
8	Win	5–3	(Thailand) Aekatit Kanyaprom	KO	3 (6), 2:15	9 Aug 2013	Hengyang Sports Centre, Hengyang, China	
7	Win	4–3	(Thailand) Thawee Thodamma	UD	6	8 Jun 2013	EXPO Garden Hotel, Kunming, China	
6	Loss	3–3	(Thailand) Morakot CP Freshmart	UD	10	12 Mar 2013	Big C Shopping Centre, Bangkok, Thailand	For WBC Youth flyweight title
5	Loss	3–2	(Japan) Ippei Aoki	UD	8	23 Sep 2012	Sangyo Hall, Kanazawa, Japan	
4	Win	3–1	(Thailand) Anuntachai Somnuek	UD	6	28 Jun 2012	Grand Waldo Conference and Exhibition Centre, Macau, SAR	
3	Win	2–1	(Thailand) Anuntachai Somnuek	UD	8	19 Nov 2011	People's Stadium, Tianjin, China	
2	Loss	1–1	(Philippines) Jerwin Ancajas	UD	10	27 Aug 2011	People's Stadium, Tianjin, China	
1	Win	1–0	(Philippines) Elmar Francisco	MD	10	3 Dec 2010	Tianjin Sports Arena, Tianjin, China	Won vacant WBO Youth junior-bantamweight title

Sporting positions
Regional boxing titles
Inaugural champion	WBO Youth junior-bantamweight champion 3 December 2010 – April 2011	Vacant Title next held by Daniel Rosas
Vacant Title last held by Froilan Saludar	WBO Asia Pacific flyweight champion 27 December 2014 – 8 May 2015	Succeeded by Macrea Gandionco
Vacant Title last held by Froilan Saludar	WBO Oriental flyweight champion Interim title 24 June 2016 – November 2016; Promoted to full champion	Vacant Title next held by Ronnie Baldonado
Vacant Title last held by Prasitsak Phaprom	WBO Oriental flyweight champion November 2016 – January 2017	Vacant Title next held by Giemel Magramo
Vacant Title last held by Rexon Flores	WBO Inter-Continental light-flyweight champion 20 January 2018 – August 2018	Vacant
Vacant Title last held by Gilberto Parra	WBC Silver light-flyweight champion 15 September 2018 – July 2019	Vacant
Vacant Title last held by Mark Anthony Barriga	WBO International mini-flyweight champion 17 August 2019 – present	Incumbent
