= Giovanni Caro =

Mexican boxer (born 1983)

Personal information
- Nickname: El Ruso
- Born: 14 November 1983 (age 42) Mexico City, Mexico
- Height: 5 ft 8 in (182 cm)
- Weight: Super bantamweight

Boxing career
- Reach: 70 in (178 cm)
- Stance: Counterpuncher

Boxing record
- Total fights: 55
- Wins: 27
- Win by KO: 21
- Losses: 24
- Draws: 4
- No contests: 0

Giovanni Caro (born 14 November 1983) is a Mexican professional boxer of Russian descent.

== Professional career ==
Giovanni's won the WBC FECARBOX Super Bantamweight title against veteran Breilor Terán of Venezuela.

=== IBF Super Bantamweight Championship ===
On 29 October 2011 Caro lost a controversial IBF Super Bantamweight championship against Takalani Ndlovu.
