= Sean McGoldrick =

Welsh boxer (born 1991)

Personal information
- Nationality: Welsh
- Born: Sean McGoldrick; 3 December 1991 (age 34) Newport, Wales
- Height: 5 ft 5 in (165 cm)
- Weight: Bantamweight

Boxing career
- Stance: Orthodox

Boxing record
- Total fights: 10
- Wins: 9
- Win by KO: 2
- Losses: 1
Medal record
Men's Boxing
Representing Wales
Commonwealth Games
Gold medal – first place	2010 Delhi	Bantamweight
Bronze medal – third place	2014 Glasgow	Bantamweight

Sean McGoldrick (born 3 December 1991) is a Welsh professional boxer who has held the British and Commonwealth bantamweight titles since February 2023. As an amateur he was awarded the gold medal for the Bantamweight division at the 2010 Commonwealth Games

== Amateur career ==
McGoldrick was born in Duffryn, Newport. At the time of the games, he was an 18-year-old pupil at Duffryn Comprehensive School and the Wales national coach was Colin Jones.

On 24 October 2010 National Olympic Committee of Sri Lanka announced that Wanniarachchi had failed a drugs test taken during the 2010 Commonwealth Games. A urine sample provided by the boxer had contained nandrolone, a banned performance-enhancing drug. Wanniarachchi claims he failed the drugs test due to the asthma medication he was taking. Wanniarachchi subsequently failed the second drugs test and intended to launch an appeal.

In December 2010 McGoldrick was selected as BBC Wales Junior Sportsman of the Year.

In June 2011 McGoldrick was retroactively awarded the 2010 Commonwealth Games Bantamweight gold medal.

== Professional boxing record ==
14 fights	13 wins	1 loss
By knockout	3	0
By decision	10	1

Key to abbreviations used for results
DQ	Disqualification	RTD	Corner retirement
KO	Knockout	SD	Split decision / split draw
MD	Majority decision / majority draw	TD	Technical decision / technical draw
NC	No contest	TKO	Technical knockout
PTS	Points decision	UD	Unanimous decision / unanimous draw

Boxing record
No.	Result	Record	Opponent	Type	Round(s), time	Date	Location	Notes
4	Win	4–0	(Ghana) Michael Barnor	TKO	3 (6), 2:04	3 Feb 2018	(United Kingdom) The O2 Arena, London, England, UK	
3	Win	3–0	(Hungary) Gyula Dodu	TKO	1 (6), 2:26	29 Jul 2017	(United Kingdom) Tudor Grange Leisure Centre, Solihull, England, UK	
2	Win	2–0	(United Kingdom) Ricky Starkey	PTS	6	10 Jun 2017	(United Kingdom) Odyssey Arena, Belfast, Northern Ireland, UK	
1	Win	1–0	(United Kingdom) Brett Fidoe	PTS	4	25 Mar 2017	(United Kingdom) Manchester Arena, Manchester, England, UK	Professional debut
