= Xiang Jing (artist) =

Chinese sculptor (born 1968)

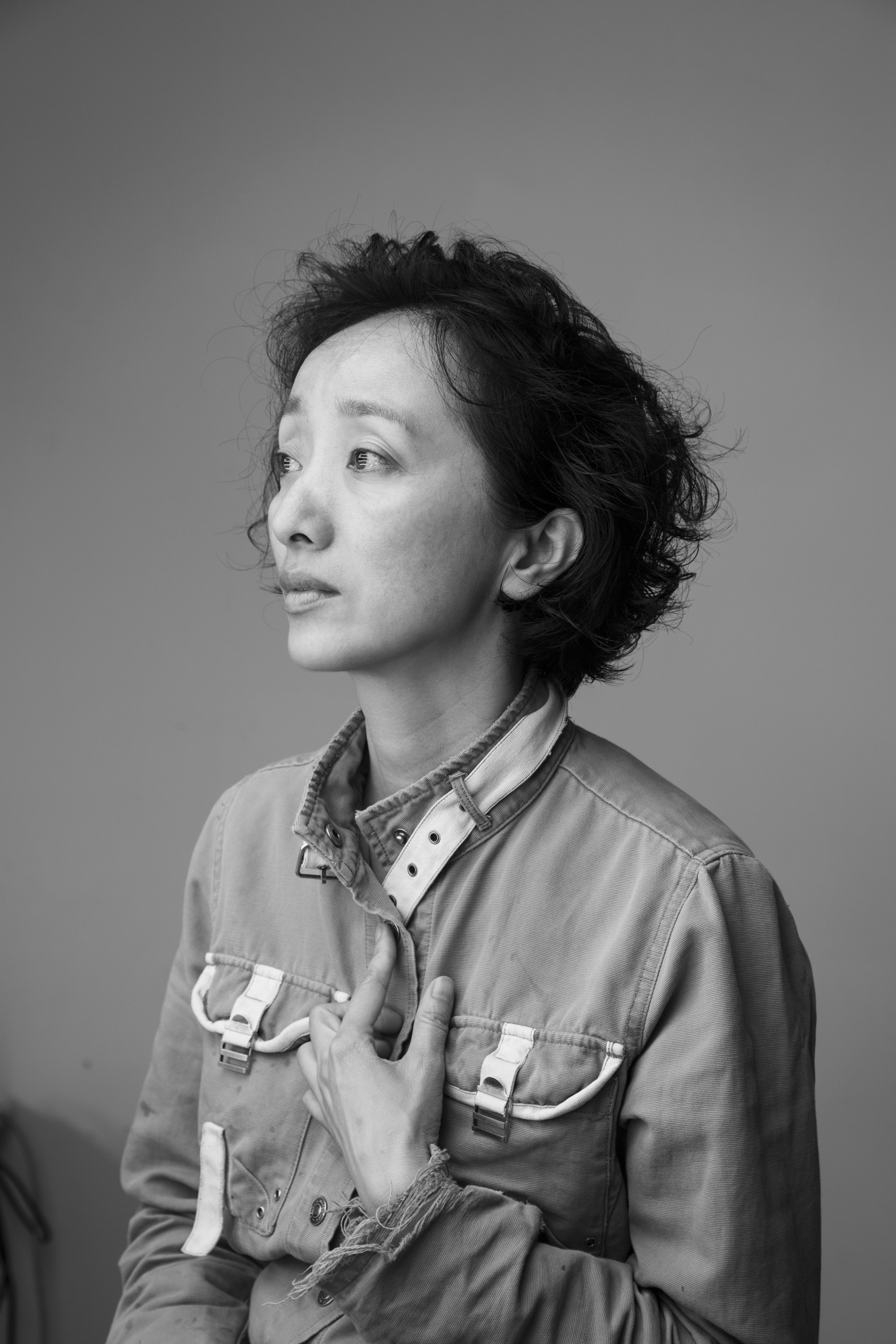
Xiang Jing in 2015

Xiang Jing (born 1968) is a Chinese contemporary sculptor known for her figurative works that explore themes of femininity, identity, and the human condition. Her sculptures often feature life-sized, introspective female figures and have been exhibited widely in China and internationally.

== Works ==
Xiang Jing is considered highly satirical and there are questions that are raised surrounding the plight of the post-feminist movement of women. She shows the emotions and expresses the mindset of women which causes her work to shift from personal to political. She captures the current trends, some popular activities that contemporary women indulge in (clubbing, shopping, etc.). Xiang Jing hardly ever uses synthetic materials in her works. She uses some props including cigarettes.

== Quotes ==
=== Directly from Xiang Jing ===
"Each female artist possesses sensitivity, particularly with regard to gender or issues. Before making this batch of sculptures, I reflected on why I have always avoided a feminist stance, though in truth I confront gender roles. What, after all, is my instinctive fundamental stance? Without any hesitation, I know my own stance, just as I look at this world with a woman's eyes, as a matter of my intrinsic nature. This is not simply a question of gender politics. Given this undeniable precondition, I will definitely speak from my feminine identity. I use the female body first of all to remind people that I am a woman. In this world I live in, a naked figure commands more attention, after all, than one wearing clothes. So I use a woman's body to state who I am, to speak of how a woman thinks and looks at things. This is the foundation on which I create these pieces. I am no longer those women in art history who were always being looked at. Given this approach to creating female figures, I do not feel they are a hackneyed subject. I like to say that my mode of expression is "in the first person." — Xiang Jing x Zhu Zhu

"I did And You? after I did Your Body. I wanted to transcend something in Your Body; I succeeded or not, different people might have different ideas. But for me, it meant a huge difference. It's often the case – even in our daily life – the sort of expression you look for can't be voice out, but if we gather strength and voice it out, it's a progress. When you voice it out, the you've also jumped over the obstacle. "Your Body" came really out of my instinct and nature; I accumulated knowledge and experience to that extent and produced such a work with so much effort, but I have always wanted to transcend it." ... Your Body actually started my first-person narration approach. When I was creating that piece, my life was very isolated indeed, and that instinct just burst out suddenly. I strongly wish my first-person narration approach could get more established. In this new exhibition I get ready to produce a group of purer works of female bodies. Moreover, I indeed want to transcend it; when I jump over that obstacle, I will feel quite relieved. — Xiang Jing x Huang Zhuan

=== About Xiang Jing ===
"Xiang Jing is an unusually independently-minded young Chinese woman. Her personality is a blend of bohemian free spirit and down-to-earth common sense, underscored by a feisty mental attitude towards life and art. Life saw fit to place this personality in a delicate physical frame, and set behind a pair of large round eyes, the innocence of which belies this woman's talent for penetrating insight. Where, to date, Xiang Jing's art has focused on the female form, the woman's body has evolved as a conduit for her observations on the state of women in contemporary China: observations that, in early 2008, she decided to draw together in one exhibition, and to act as a denouement for this phase of her career. Having reached a certain maturity, Xiang Jing feels it is time to move onto something new." — Karen Smith

After going through numerous births and miscarriages, Xiang Jing intends to conclude the stage of her work that concerns the "female body." To engage in critiquing her work is like travelling to a nation of women that is about to declare independence. The scaffolding has yet to be removed, but a mood of festive observance is in the air.

For an artist to conclude a stage in her creative work usually means that her passion and energy toward the theme has found release, and she realizes that to continue would lead to nothing but self-replication of a certain few pieces. A better reason might be that her iconic pieces had already been produced, and the artist's desire for expression had been gratified. If she ever resumes this theme sometime in the future, it would mean that broader understanding and experience will have shown her new possibilities of self-overcoming. Xiang Jing's present achievements in sculpture give ample proof of her singular strength within a certain thematic range. The works that best represent the level she has reached are Your Body (2005) and Are A Hundred Playing You? Or Only One? (2007). — Zhu Zhu

"If you put a real person's face next to it, you will see a lot of differences. But what matters to me is [...] the poignancy of the expression." "I want my art to awaken the sensibility of each onlooker, to awaken his body, so that his body can experience the sculpture. That's why I really want people to stand right in front of my sculpture, to face (it)."

== Public collection ==
- Annie Wong Art Foundation, Vancouver, Canada
- CAFA Art Museum, Beijing, China
- Chazen Museum of Art, University of Wisconsin at Madison, Madison, WI, United States
- JUT Group Collection, Taiwan
- Liu-HaiSu Art Museum, Shanghai, China
- Long Museum, Shanghai, China
- M+ Museum, Hong Kong
- Museum of Contemporary Art, Chengdu, China
- OCT Group Collection, Shenzhen, China
- Shanghai Art Museum, Shanghai, China
- Shanghai Himalayas Museum, Shanghai, China
- Shanghai World Expo Permanent Collection, Shanghai, China
- Tan Guobin Contemporary Art Museum, Changsha, China
- Today Art Museum, Beijing, China
- Yuz Museum, Shanghai, China

== Solo exhibitions ==
2015

- Juergen Teller | Xiang Jing, Lehmann Maupin Gallery, Hong Kong.

2013

- Will Things Ever Get Better? - Xiang Jing @ MoCA Tp2013, Museum of Contemporary Art, Taipei.

2012

- Will Things Ever Get Better? - Xiang Jing and Guangci Joint-Exhibition, Museum of Contemporary Art, Shanghai, China.
- Birdcalls in the Floating World, Xiang Jing vs. Qu Guangci, MOT/ARTS, Taipei; Hong Kong Arts Centre, Hong Kong.
- Xiang Jing: The Center of Quietude, Gao Magee Gallery, Madrid, Spain.

2001 - 2011

- Will Things Ever Get Better? - Xiang Jing's Work 2008-2011, Today Art Museum, Beijing, China (2011)
- I Have Seen Happiness, Park Hyatt Beijing, Beijing, China (2011)
- Naked Beyond Skin - An Asian Touring Project of Sculpture Imageries by Xiang Jing, Tang Contemporary Art, Hong Kong, Bangkok, Beijing, China (2008)
- Are a Hundred Playing You? Or Only One?, Eslite Gallery, Taipei (2007)
- Your Body - Xiang Jing's Work 2000-2005, Shanghai Art Museum, Shanghai, China (2006)
- Keep In Silence, China Art Seasons Gallery, Beijing, China (2005)
- Women In The Mirror, European Art Center, Xiamen, China (2003)
- Xiang Jing · Guangci 2002 - Mirror Image, Invisible Gallery, Shanghai, China (2002)
- Day Dream, Ivy Bookstore, Shanghai, China (2001)

== Selected group exhibitions ==
2016

- Utopias·Heterotopias - Wuzhen International Contemporary Art Exhibition, Wuzhen·North Silk Factory and West Scenic Zone, China.
- Echo of Civilization - Crossing Dunhuang, The Imperial Ancestral Museum of China, Beijing, China.

2015

- The Vivid Spirit - Chinese Contemporary Art Invitational Exhibition, The Confucius Temple of Anxi, Quanzhou, China.
- Fervent China - Contemporary Monumental Sculptures, The Former Slaughterhouse, Anciens Abattoirs, Mons, Belgium.
- China 8 - Contemporary Art from China at Rhine & Ruhr, Lehmbruck Museum, Duisburg, Germany.
- Tradition and Innovation - The Human Figure in Contemporary Chinese Art, Chazen Museum of Art, University of Wisconsin at Madison, Madison, WI, United States.

2014

- Re-Sculpture:1 Sanguandian Art 2014, Hubei Museum of Art, Wuhan, China
- West Says East Says - Chinese Contemporary Art Research Exhibition, United Art Museum, Wuhan, China
- Us and Them - Existential Dialectic of Selves and Others, How Art Museum (Wenzhou), Wenzhou, China
- Re-View: Opening Exhibition of Long Museum West Bund, Long Museum West Bund, Shanghai

2013

- I·Us, MOT/ARTS, Taipei.
- Bridging: Important Female Artists of Our Time, Hong Kong Arts Centre, Hong Kong.
- The 4th Biennale of Art Changsha, Changsha Municipal Museum, Changsha, China.
- Portrait of the Times - 30 Years of Chinese Contemporary Art, Power Station of Art, Shanghai, China.

2012

- Future Pass World Exhibition, Today Art Museum, Beijing, China.
- Real Life Stories - Contemporary Chinese Art Exhibition, KODE Art Museums of Bergen, Bergen, Norway.
- Sculpt China: CAFA Retrospective Exhibition, Central Academy of Fine Arts (CAFA) Art Museum, Beijing, China.
- The Height - The 1st Xinjiang Contemporary Art Biennale, Xinjiang International Expo Center, Urumuqi, China.
- Martell Artists of the Year 2012 Touring Exhibition, Today Art Museum, Beijing, China; Guangdong Museum of Art, Guangzhou China; Shanghai Art Museum, Shanghai, China.
- Passing Through Memory - Suzhou Jinji Lake Art Gallery Opening Exhibition, Jinji Lake Art Gallery, Suzhou, China.

2011

- Start From The Horizon - Chinese Contemporary Sculpture Since 1978, Sishang Art Museum, Beijing, China.
- Half the Sky: Women in the New Art of China, Drexel University Gallery, Philadelphia, PA, United States.
- Collecting History - Chinese New Art, MoCA, Chengdu, China.
- Future Pass - From Asia To The World, Abbazia di San Gregorio, Venice, Italy.
- GuanXi - Contemporary Chinese Art, Today Art Museum, Beijing; Guangdong Museum of Art, Guangzhou, China.

2010

- Self-Image - Woman Art in China (1920-2010), CAFA Art Museum, Beijing, China.
- Reshaping History - Chinart from 2000 to 2009, China National Convention Center, Beijing, China.
- It's Not Sculpture, Linda Gallery, Beijing, China.

2009

- Translucence - Female Contemporary Art from China, La Centrale Electrique - European Center of Contemporary Art, Brussels, Belgium.
- Collision - Experimental Cases of Contemporary Chinese Art, CAFA Art Museum, Beijing, China.
- To the Motherland - 60 Years of Art in New China, National Art Museum of China, Beijing, China.
- 19 Games - A Chinese Contemporary Art Exhibition, UNDP / UNAIDS / UNESCO / UNICEF / Marie Stopes International China/ Hong Kong Ze Shan Foundation, T Art Center, Beijing, China
- The Tale of Angels, The Red Mansion Foundation, London, United Kingdom

2008

- The Revolution Continues - New Chinese Art, The Saatchi Gallery, London, United Kingdom.
- Artificial Nature @ Art Lab, Museum of Contemporary Art, Shanghai, China.
- People · China - The Humanism in 20th Century Chinese Art, CAFA Art Museum, Beijing, China.
- Case Studies of Artists in Art History and Art Criticism, SZ Art Center, Beijing, China.

2007

- China - Facing Reality, Museum Moderner Kunst Stiftung Ludwig, Vienna, Austria.
- Post Avant - Garde Chinese Contemporary Art, Atting House, Hong Kong.
- The 1st Today's Documents - Energy: Spirit·Body·Material, Today Art Museum, Beijing, China.
- Calling a Stag a Horse - Sculpture by Guangci, Xiang Jing, Chen Wenling and Cao Hui, Sanshang Art, Beijing, China.
- China Now, Cobra Museum of Modern Art, Amstelveen, Netherlands.
- She & I: Sculpture by Xiang Jing & Guangci, China Square, New York, NY, United States.
- OPEN 10 - the International Exhibition of Sculpture and Installation, Venice Lido, Italy.
- Ge An Guan Huo, Evangelische Studierenden gemeinde (Dietrich Bonhoeffer - Haus), Kassel, Germany.
- Art Lan @ Asia, ZAIM Art Center, Yokohama, Japan.
- Tanah Air: Seni Patung dan Lingkungan, Pakuwon City Complex, Surabaya, Indonesia.

2006

- Women In a Society of Double-Sexuality, Tang Contemporary Art Bangkok, Thailand.
- Soliloquy - China / Indonesia Contemporary Sculpture Exhibition, Indonesian National Gallery, Jakarta, Indonesia.
- Art in Motion - Dialogues in Contemporary Art, Museum of Contemporary Art, Shanghai, China.
- China Now: Art in Times of Change, ESSL Museum of Contemporary Art, Vienna, Austria.
- Entry Gate: Chinese Aesthetics of Heterogeneity, Museum of Contemporary Art, Shanghai, China.
- Jiang Hu, Jack Tilton Gallery, New York, NY, United States.

2005

- Sculpting a Century, Shanghai City Sculpture Center, Shanghai, China.
- In the Deep of Reality: A Case of Chinese Contemporary Art, Liu He Tian Yu Basement, Hangzhou, China.

2004

- Dreams of the Dragon's Nation—Chinese Contemporary Art Exhibition, Irish Museum of Modern Art, Dublin, Ireland.
- MMAC Art College Performance Festival 2004, Aizu-Mishima / Tokyo, Japan.
- Witness—Sculptures by Xiang Jing and Guangci, He Xiangning Art Museum, Shenzhen, China.
- China Imagination: Chinese Contemporary Sculptural Art Exhibition, Jardindes Tuileries, Paris, France.

2003

- New Zone – Chinese Art, Zacheta National Gallery of Art, Warsaw, Poland.
- Sculptures by Xiang Jing and Guangci, Casas-Museu da Taipa, Macau, China.
- XII Inner Spaces multimedia festival, CCA Inner Spaces, Poznan, Poland.
- The third Shanghai Young Sculptors Exhibition, Century Plaza, Nanjing Road, Shanghai, China.
- National Art Gallery, Beijing, China.

2002

- Xiang Jing Guang Ci 2002 —Mirror Image, Invisible Gallery, Shanghai, China.
- The Standards of Chinese Contemporary Sculptures, Shanghai Museum, Shanghai, China

2001

- Salon' d'automne, Espace Auteuil, Paris, France.
- The 32nd Grosse Kunst Ausstellung Düsseldorf, Eingang Nord, Düsseldorf, Germany.
- Framed Samples—The 1st Chengdu Art Biennale, Chengdu Contemporary Art Museum, Chengdu, China.

2000

- Yawn was exhibited in the Chinese Contemporary Sculptures Invitation Exhibition, Tsingtao Sculptural Art Gallery, Tsingtao, China.
- Young Sculptors Invitation Exhibition, West Lake Art Gallery, Shengzhen.
- College of Sculpture and Tsingtao Sculpture Gallery, China.
- Conversations with Henry Moore - Sculptures Invitation Exhibition, Guangdong Art Gallery, Guangzhou, China.

1999

- Journey to the End of Century – The 2nd Exhibition,+ New Space-ART Express, Beijing, China.
- Chinese Sculptures Annual Exhibition, He Xiang-ning Art Museum, Shenzhen, China.
- Oil Paintings & Sculptures by Teachers from the Fine Art college, Shanghai.
- The Century Gate – Invitation Exhibition of Chinese Art from 1979–1999, Chengdu Modern Art Gallery, Chengdu, China.

1998

- Century-Female, Chinese National Art Gallery, Beijing, China
- October Exhibition for Beijing Youth Sculptors, Gallery of Central Academy of Contemporary Sculptural Art Annual Exhibition, He Xiangning Art Gallery, Shenzhen, China.
- Chinese Artists Exhibition, Zurichsee-Auktionen Gallery, Switzerland.
- Platform for Both Genders, Taida Contemporary Art Museum, Tianjin, China.

1995

- The Four-Girl Show in March, Modern Art Gallery, Beijing, China.
- Graduate Show, Central Academy of Fine Arts, Beijing, China.
- Chinese Women Artists Invitation Exhibition, Chinese National Art Gallery, Beijing, China.
