= José Cabrera (boxer) =

Mexican boxer (born 1987)

Personal information
- Nickname: Matador
- Born: José Cabrera; 19 March 1987 (age 39) Tampico, Tamaulipas, Mexico
- Height: 1.77 m (5 ft 10 in)
- Weight: Light bantamweight Super flyweight

Boxing career
- Reach: 183 cm (72 in)
- Stance: Orthodox

Boxing record
- Total fights: 30
- Wins: 22
- Win by KO: 7
- Losses: 6
- Draws: 2
- No contests: 0

José Cabrera (born 19 March 1987) is a Mexican former professional boxer who competed from 2004 to 2014. He challenged for the WBO super flyweight title in 2012.

== Professional career ==
On 21 November 2009 Cabrera beat Jovanny Soto to win the NABF super flyweight title in Nuevo Laredo, Tamaulipas, Mexico.
