= Drian Francisco =

Filipino boxer

Personal information
- Nickname: Gintong Kamao ("Golden Fist")
- Nationality: (Philippines) Filipino
- Born: Adrian Francisco; November 10, 1982 (age 43) Sablayan, Philippines
- Height: 5 ft 5 in (1.65 m)
- Weight: Super Flyweight

Boxing career
- Stance: Orthodox

Boxing record
- Total fights: 36
- Wins: 29
- Win by KO: 22
- Losses: 6
- Draws: 1

Drian Francisco (born November 10, 1982, in Sablayan, Occidental Mindoro, Philippines), nicknamed Gintong Kamao (Golden Fist), is a Filipino professional boxer. Born in the province of Mindoro, Francisco currently resides in Agoncillo, Batangas. His younger brother Lloyd Francisco, like him, is also a professional boxer.

== Fighting style ==
Francisco is known for his powerful punches and aggressive style. His style was formerly compared to that of Luisito Espinosa.

== Professional career ==
Francisco's father, Joe, was a former pro who is now a fireman. Early in his professional career, he was trained by former world flyweight titlist Erbito Salavarria.

He won the WBO Asia Pacific flyweight title by a 7th-round TKO win over Pichitchok Singmanassak on December 30, 2006. On August 4, 2007, he defended it by stopping Wanmeechok Singwancha in one round.

After a year of inactivity, he was back in the ring on April 19, 2009, where he scored a TKO win over Sharil Fabanyo. This was held at the Araneta Coliseum and was undercard of the Nonito Donaire - Raul Martinez match.

Francisco won the WBA International super flyweight title on October 3, 2009, by stopping former WBA Flyweight Champion Roberto Vasquez in 10 rounds.

He fought Ricardo Nunez in a WBA super flyweight eliminator on April 17, 2010, at the Yñares Sports Arena in Pasig, Metro Manila, Philippines. A few days before the bout, Francisco said that a win against Nunez was the key for a title shot. The Filipino boxer won the bout with an impressive knockout win at the 5th round. Francisco dominated the bout from the very start and was able to knock down Nunez twice in the opening round. Nunez survived the count and tried to defend himself and box his foe in the second and third round, connecting with some solid shot to stem Francisco's aggressive style. The boxer from Panama continued on this way in the next round but was once again put in trouble and eventually knocked down twice in the 5th, after being hammered with solid combinations. Referee Bruce McTavish stopped the bout after the second knockdown.

He fought Duangpetch Kokietgym on November 30, 2010, in Nong Khai, Thailand for the WBA interim superflyweight title. He won the bout with an impressive 10th-round knockout. It was a tough fight for Drian as Kokietgym repeatedly landed low blows. But in the end, Drian Francisco was able to overcome and knockout Kokietgym for the victory and WBA Interim Superflyweight Championship crown. The Thai fighter was down and out for only the second time in 54 fights.

Drian Francisco will most likely fight the winner of the Dec. 23 fight between WBA superflyweight champion Hugo Cazares and Japanese challenger Hiroyuki Hisataka. The winner of that fight will be mandated to stake the crown against Francisco on March 9. Cazares, 32, is traveling to Osaka to face Hisataka in his third title defense.

On 1 May 2011, Francisco defensed his WBA interim World Super Flyweight title to Thai boxer Tepparith Singwancha at Thailand. Francisco was knocked down in the third round. At the end Francisco lost WBA interim World Super Flyweight title for Thai boxer in Unanimous decision 113–114, 113–114, 111–117.

Drian admitted he was overconfident, he vowed to bounce back from the shock loss on points to Terrapith Singwancha and said he won't make the same mistake again. Drian fought against Michael Domingo which he won in a unanimous decision in Makati Coliseum on September 23, 2011. All three judges saw the fight in favor of the Sablayan, Mindoro Occidental native Francisco (21–1–1, 16 knockouts)—96-93, 95-94 and 96–93.

He is currently a boxing instructor at Evolve Mixed Martial Arts in Singapore.

== Professional boxing record ==
| 36 fights | 29 wins | 6 losses |
|---|---|---|
| By knockout | 22 | 2 |
| By decision | 7 | 4 |
| Draws | 1 | |

| No. | Result | Record | Opponent | Type | Round, Time | Date | Location | Notes |
|---|---|---|---|---|---|---|---|---|
| 36 | Loss | 29–6–1 | Eduardo Hernández | RTD | 2 (10), 3:00 | 26 May 2018 | Teatro Moliere, Mexico City, Mexico | |
| 35 | Loss | 29–5–1 | Edivaldo Ortega | UD | 10 | 27 Jan 2018 | Auditorio Fausto Gutierrez Moreno, Tijuana, Mexico | |
| 34 | Win | 29–4–1 | Mateo Handig | UD | 10 | 18 Feb 2017 | Makati Cinema Square Boxing Arena, Makati, Philippines | |
| 33 | Loss | 28–4–1 | Guillermo Rigondeaux | UD | 10 | 21 Nov 2015 | Mandalay Bay, Paradise, Nevada, U.S. | For vacant WBC International Silver super bantamweight title |
| 32 | Win | 28–3–1 | Jilo Merlin | KO | 1 (10), 2:12 | 6 Sep 2015 | Barangay Labangal Gym, General Santos, Philippines | |
| 31 | Loss | 27–3–1 | Jason Canoy Manigos | TKO | 1 (10), 2:12 | 30 May 2015 | Lagao Gym, General Santos, Philippines | |
| 30 | Win | 27–2–1 | Jason Egera | RTD | 8 (10), 3:00 | 31 Jan 2015 | University of Southeastern Philippines Gymansium, Davao City, Philippines | |
| 29 | Win | 26–2–1 | John Mark Apolinario | UD | 10 | 8 Nov 2014 | Almendras Gym, Davao City, Philippines | |
| 28 | Win | 25–2–1 | Manuel de los Reyes Herrera | KO | 3 (10), 0:48 | 2 Aug 2014 | Alameda County Fairgrounds, Pleasanton, California, U.S. | |
| 27 | Loss | 24–2–1 | Chris Avalos | UD | 10 | 12 Jul 2013 | Texas Station, North Las Vegas, Nevada, U.S. | For vacant NABO super bantamweight title |
| 26 | Win | 24–1–1 | Javier Gallo | TKO | 5 (8), 2:54 | 19 Nov 2012 | Los Angeles Memorial Sports Arena, Los Angeles, California, U.S. | |
| 25 | Win | 23–1–1 | Jose Carlos Vargas | KO | 1 (10) | 29 Sep 2012 | Estadio Héctor Espino, Hermosillo, Mexico | |
| 24 | Win | 22–1–1 | Pichitchai Twins Gym | KO | 1 (12), 0:33 | 14 Apr 2012 | Sablayan Astrodome, Sablayan, Philippines | |
| 23 | Win | 21–1–1 | Michael Domingo | UD | 10 | 23 Sep 2011 | Makati Coliseum, Makati, Philippines | |
| 22 | Loss | 20–1–1 | Tepparith Singwancha | UD | 12 | 1 May 2011 | Benjamatheputid School, Phetchaburi, Thailand | Lost WBA Interim super flyweight title |
| 21 | Win | 20–0–1 | Duangpetch Kokietgym | TKO | 10 (12), 1:57 | 30 Nov 2010 | Bueng Kan School, Bueng Kan, Nong Khai, Thailand | Won WBA Interim super flyweight title |
| 20 | Win | 19–0–1 | Ricardo Nunez | KO | 5 (12), 2:52 | 17 Apr 2010 | Ynares Sports Arena, Pasig, Philippines | WBA super flyweight title eliminator |
| 19 | Win | 18–0–1 | Roberto Vásquez | TKO | 10 (12), 2:22 | 3 Oct 2009 | Cuneta Astrodome, Pasay, Philippines | |
| 18 | Win | 17–0–1 | Sahril Fabanyo | KO | 2 (8), 1:33 | 19 Apr 2009 | Araneta Coliseum, Barangay Cubao, Quezon City, Philippines | |
| 17 | Win | 16–0–1 | Wanchana Onesongchai | KO | 2 (10), 2:57 | 20 Dec 2008 | Elorde Sports Center, Parañaque, Philippines | |
| 16 | Win | 15–0–1 | Jun Eraham | UD | 10 | 19 Apr 2008 | Elorde Sports Center, Parañaque, Philippines | |
| 15 | Win | 14–0–1 | Samart Twingym | KO | 1 (10), 1:17 | 1 Dec 2007 | Zamboanga City Coliseum, Barangay Tetuan, Zamboanga City, Philippines | |
| 14 | Draw | 13–0–1 | Nino Suelo | TD | 4 (10), 0:46 | 16 Nov 2007 | San Andres Civic & Sports Center, Malate, Manila, Philippines | Fight stopped due to a cut on Francisco's forehead caused by an accidental headbutt in round 4 |
| 13 | Win | 13–0 | Wanmeechok Singwancha | KO | 1 (12), 2:20 | 4 Aug 2007 | Elorde Sports Center, Parañaque, Philippines | Retained WBO Asia Pacific flyweight title |
| 12 | Win | 12–0 | Deeden Sithsaithong | TKO | 5 (10), 0:48 | 22 Apr 2007 | San Jose, Occidental Mindoro, Philippines | |
| 11 | Win | 11–0 | Edwin Tumbaga | TKO | 2 (6), 0:55 | 25 Feb 2007 | Baguio City Convention Center, Baguio, Philippines | |
| 10 | Win | 10–0 | Pichitchai Twins Gym | TKO | 7 (12), 1:03 | 30 Dec 2006 | Mandaluyong Gym, Mandaluyong Sports Center, Mandaluyong, Philippines | Won WBO Asia Pacific flyweight title |
| 9 | Win | 9–0 | Alex Guevarra | TKO | 5 (10), 2:24 | 13 Oct 2006 | Trece Martires Gym, Trece Martires, Philippines | |
| 8 | Win | 8–0 | Jongjong Gagante | TKO | 7 (8), 0:15 | 26 Aug 2006 | Mandaluyong Gym, Mandaluyong Sports Center, Mandaluyong, Philippines | |
| 7 | Win | 7–0 | Jung Soo Jung | TKO | 5 (8), 1:18 | 9 Jun 2006 | Cavite Coliseum, Bacoor, Philippines | |
| 6 | Win | 6–0 | Renato Nival | TKO | 4 (8), 2:49 | 21 Apr 2006 | Cavite Coliseum, Bacoor, Philippines | |
| 5 | Win | 5–0 | Johary Rosia | UD | 6 | 10 Dec 2005 | Ynares Center, Antipolo, Philippines | |
| 4 | Win | 4–0 | Manny Pacqouan | UD | 6 | 29 Oct 2005 | Mandaluyong Gym, Mandaluyong Sports Center, Mandaluyong, Philippines | |
| 3 | Win | 3–0 | Jose Samson Martin | UD | 4 | 27 Aug 2005 | Elorde Sports Center, Parañaque, Philippines | |
| 2 | Win | 2–0 | Joshua Manzano | TKO | 2 (4), 0:28 | 17 Jun 2005 | Ynares Center, Antipolo, Philippines | |
| 1 | Win | 1–0 | Jessie Caballes | TKO | 2 (4) | 29 Apr 2005 | Tambo Seaside Square, Barangay Tambo, Parañaque, Philippines | |

| Vacant Title last held by Nonito Donaire | WBA Super Flyweight Champion; Interim Title; November 30, 2010 – May 1, 2011 | Succeeded by Tepparith Singwancha |
