= Tomonobu Shimizu =

Japanese boxer

Tomonobu Shimizu 清水 智信
Personal information
- Nickname: Speed Star
- Born: June 28, 1981 (age 45) Fukui, Fukui, Japan
- Height: 5 ft 6 in (168 cm)
- Weight: Flyweight; Super flyweight

Boxing career
- Reach: 67 in (170 cm)
- Stance: Orthodox

Boxing record
- Total fights: 24
- Wins: 19
- Win by KO: 9
- Losses: 4
- Draws: 1

Tomonobu Shimizu (清水 智信, Shimizu Tomonobu; born June 28, 1981) is a Japanese professional boxer who is a former WBA super flyweight champion. He is an alumnus of the Tokyo University of Agriculture.

== Biography ==
Shimizu had an amateur record of 68–10 (25 KOs). He turned to professional and made his debut in March 2004. He is managed by Kentarō Kaneko's Kaneko Boxing Gym and trained under Kenji Kaneko's guidance.

In April 2007, Shimizu lost to Pongsaklek Wonjongkam in the WBC flyweight championship in Sara Buri, Thailand. Then he captured the Japanese flyweight title in April 2008. After losing his second world title shot against Daisuke Naito at the Yoyogi National Stadium First Gymnasium in Tokyo, Japan, in July of that year, he defeated the interim champion Toshiyuki Igarashi in the Japanese title unification match and defended that title three more times.

=== WBA super flyweight title ===
Shimizu moved up in weight division and won the WBA super flyweight title with a split decision over Hugo Cázares at the Nippon Budokan in Tokyo, on August 31, 2011. It was presented by Kameda Promotions. At first, WBA's Gilberto Mendoza did not approve this fight. However it was authorized at the last minute. He suffered a fracture of the right orbital floor in that fight. Although it took three months to recover, the prospects for recovery were clear, and Shimizu had started training for the first defense that would take place in around March 2012. Nevertheless, the JBC (Japan Boxing Commission) indefinitely-suspended second Shirō Kameda, and identically the JBC indefinitely-suspended promoter Noriyuki Igarashi (both from Kameda Promotions) requested that the scheduled interim WBA super flyweight title match Tepparith Kokietgym vs. Daiki Kameda would be elevated to the regular title bout at the WBA Championship Committee in Donetsk, Ukraine. Kaneko Boxing Gym and Kameda Gym are both members of the East Japan Boxing Association. The Association, in principle, has deemed that it is inappropriate that boxing gyms (that are members of the Association), or people not licensed by the JBC, negotiate directly with the championship sanctioning bodies on issues surrounding the fights of the JBC licensed boxers, and has decided that the JBC would serve as a point man in such instances, in November 2009.

The JBC has not allowed the intern championships to be held in Japan without a legitimate reason such as illnesses and injuries, from February 28, 2011.

As a result of that, Shimizu was designated as a champion in recess on November 10, 2011. Shimizu who has recovered from injury enough to do his usual training including sparring, and his manager Kaneko held a press conference on 29 November. Shimizu stated that he would fight against anyone as a champion. The team Shimizu strongly demanded a retraction and complained that the bout between Tepparith and Kameda should be taken place as an intern championship or a title eliminator. Kaneko Boxing Gym submitted a questionnaire with the December 5 deadline to the JBC. In that questionnaire, Kaneko Boxing Gym has asked for the definition of what the WBA's champion in recess is, a solid evidence-based hierarchy between a champion in recess and a regular champion, the reason why the JBC did not allow the intern championship in this case, the disclosure of the official document where they designated Shimizu as the champion in recess and approve Tepparith vs. Kameda as a regular championship, and so on. The team Shimizu mentioned that they would give up the title, if they can not get a coherent answer. The WBA's decision to make Shimizu a champion in recess has been controversial in Japan, and it has been continuously reported in the major media such as three major newspapers. Although Kaneko Boxing Gym were given the almost zero response from the JBC, as the maximum concession, they barely accepted the status quo on condition that the unification match is early implemented. With intense criticism for the WBA and Kameda Promotions, some point out the overall lack of international political power of Japan's boxing gyms.

Shimizu fought against Tepparith Kokietgym in the WBA super flyweight unification bout at the Yokohama Arena on April 4, 2012. The day before the fight, the WBA supervisor Alan Kim announced that a draw result would make both boxers co-regular champions and a direct rematch would be in order to decide a sole regular champion. It was staged again by Kameda Promotions who had also had the exclusive promotional rights for the future title defense ahead of Simizu. Shimizu lost there via a ninth round stoppage. After the fight, Shimizu mentioned that he would not waste the last six months where he grew both as a boxer and as a person.

In April 2015, Shimizu was elected to Fukui Prefectural Assembly from Fukui City constituency as an independent.

== Professional boxing record ==
24 fights	19 wins	4 losses
By knockout	9	4
By decision	10	0
Draws	1	

No.	Result	Record	Opponent	Type	Round, time	Date	Location	Notes
24	Loss	19–4–1	Tepparith Singwancha	TKO	9 (12), 2:15	Apr 4, 2012	Arena, Yokohama, Japan	For WBA super-flyweight title
23	Win	19–3–1	Hugo Cázares	SD	12	Aug 31, 2011	Nippon Budokan, Tokyo, Japan	Won WBA super-flyweight title
22	Win	18–3–1	Petchek Sithkorpolkanpim	TKO	4 (8), 0:26	Apr 2, 2011	Korakuen Hall, Tokyo, Japan	
21	Win	17–3–1	Kewpie Kanazawa	TKO	6 (10), 0:36	Aug 9, 2010	Korakuen Hall, Tokyo, Japan	Retained Japanese flyweight title
20	Win	16–3–1	Takayasu Kobayashi	TKO	7 (10), 0:59	Feb 8, 2010	Korakuen Hall, Tokyo, Japan	Retained Japanese flyweight title
19	Win	15–3–1	Wisan Sor Suchanya	TKO	5 (10), 2:19	Sep 10, 2009	Korakuen Hall, Tokyo, Japan	
18	Draw	14–3–1	Shigetaka Ikehara	TD	2 (10), 0:57	Apr 19, 2009	Korakuen Hall, Tokyo, Japan	Retained Japanese flyweight title
17	Win	14–3	Toshiyuki Igarashi	UD	10	Dec 23, 2008	Kokugikan, Tokyo, Japan	Retained Japanese flyweight title
16	Loss	13–3	Daisuke Naito	KO	10 (12), 0:57	Jul 30, 2008	Yoyogi National Gymnasium, Tokyo, Japan	For WBC flyweight title
15	Win	13–2	Kenji Yoshida	UD	10	Apr 14, 2008	Korakuen Hall, Tokyo, Japan	Won Japanese flyweight title
14	Win	12–2	Saknipon Singmanasak	TKO	5 (10), 2:40	Dec 4, 2007	Korakuen Hall, Tokyo, Japan	
13	Win	11–2	Yasushi Matsushita	TD	5 (10), 2:07	Jul 22, 2007	Sun Dome Fukui, Echizen, Japan	
12	Loss	10–2	Pongsaklek Wonjongkam	RTD	7 (12), 3:00	Apr 6, 2007	Tabkwang Stadium, Saraburi, Thailand	For WBC flyweight title
11	Win	10–1	Fahpetchnoi Sor Chitpattana	UD	10	Jan 21, 2007	Korakuen Hall, Tokyo, Japan	
10	Win	9–1	Vinai Wor Surapol	TKO	4 (10), 0:51	Sep 12, 2006	Korakuen Hall, Tokyo, Japan	
9	Win	8–1	Prabpram Porpreecha	TKO	7 (10), 0:30	Jun 19, 2006	Korakuen Hall, Tokyo, Japan	
8	Win	7–1	Kenji Yoshida	UD	8	Mar 15, 2006	Korakuen Hall, Tokyo, Japan	
7	Win	6–1	Hiroyuki Hisataka	UD	8	Oct 19, 2005	Korakuen Hall, Tokyo, Japan	
6	Win	5–1	Minoru Masuda	TKO	6 (8), 2:57	Aug 29, 2005	Korakuen Hall, Tokyo, Japan	
5	Win	4–1	Tetsuya Kawakami	UD	8	Jun 15, 2005	Korakuen Hall, Tokyo, Japan	
4	Win	3–1	Hiromi Fujizaki	UD	6	Mar 17, 2005	Korakuen Hall, Tokyo, Japan	
3	Win	2–1	Hyobu Nakagama	UD	6	Dec 1, 2004	Korakuen Hall, Tokyo, Japan	
2	Loss	1–1	Kaennakorn Klongpajol	TKO	1 (6), 2:05	Jul 23, 2004	Korakuen Hall, Tokyo, Japan	
1	Win	1–0	Jitsuo Mizokami	TKO	2 (6), 1:41	Mar 12, 2004	Korakuen Hall, Tokyo, Japan	

== See also ==
- Boxing in Japan
- List of Japanese boxing world champions
- List of world super-flyweight boxing champions

Sporting positions
Regional boxing titles
Preceded by Kenji Yoshida	Japanese flyweight champion April 14, 2008 – 2010; Vacated	Vacant Title next held by Toshiyuki Igarashi
World boxing titles
Preceded by Hugo Cázares	WBA super-flyweight champion August 31, 2011 – November 10, 2011; Status changed to Champion in recess	Succeeded by Tepparith Singwancha; Promoted from interim status
Honorary boxing titles
New title	WBA super-flyweight champion Champion in Recess; November 10, 2011 – April 4, 2012; Failed to regain title	Vacant
