= Pongsaklek Wonjongkam =

Thai boxer (born 1977)

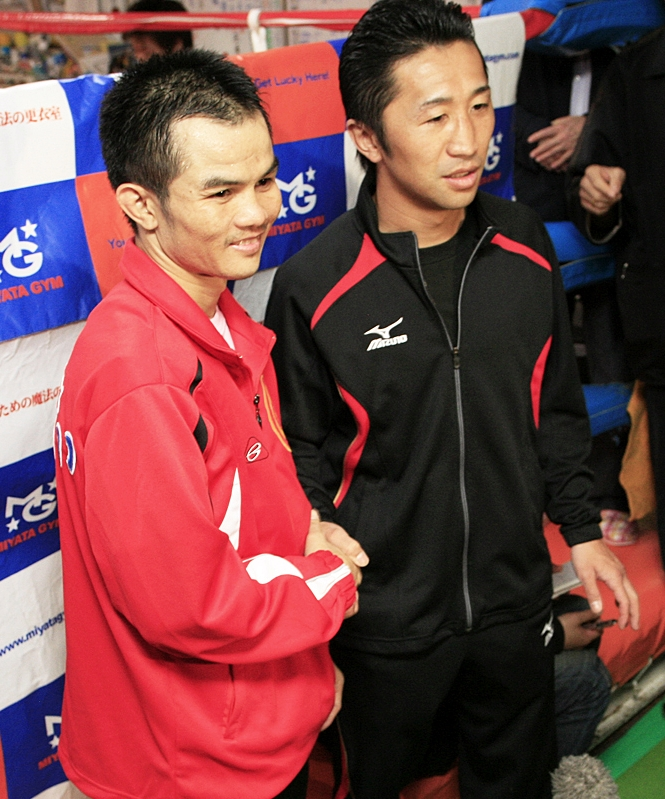
- Wonjongkam (left) and Daisuke Naito in March 2010

Personal information
- Born: Pongsakorn Wonjongkam (พงศกร วันจงคำ); 11 August 1977 (age 49) Bua Yai District, Nakhon Ratchasima Province
- Height: 5 ft 4 in (163 cm)
- Weight: Light-flyweight; Flyweight; Super-bantamweight

Boxing career
- Reach: 63 1/2 in (161 cm)
- Stance: Southpaw

Boxing record
- Total fights: 98
- Wins: 91
- Win by KO: 47
- Losses: 5
- Draws: 2

Pongsaklek Wonjongkam (Thai: พงษ์ศักดิ์เล็ก วันจงคำ; born: 11 August 1977) is a former Thai professional boxer and current boxing trainer. He is a two-time former lineal flyweight champion. During his first reign as world flyweight champion, which lasted between 2001 and 2007, Wonjongkam defended his title 17 times against 16 fighters, with both numbers being a flyweight record.

== Professional career ==
Wonjongkam had a record of 9-2 early in his career. Both losses were to Filipino journeyman Jerry Pahayahay, whom Wonjongkam would defeat by 10-round decision in February 1998. Since his second loss on July 11, 1996, to July 18, 2007, Wonjongkam won 55 consecutive bouts, the longest continuous win streak in boxing at the time.

On March 28, 1997, Wonjongkam knocked out Mzukisi Sikali of South Africa in 48 seconds to win the WBU Light Flyweight Championship. Sikali would go on to hold both the IBO Flyweight and WBU Super Flyweight titles.

=== WBC Flyweight Champion ===
On March 2, 2001, Wonjongkam fought Malcolm Tuñacao for the WBC and Lineal Flyweight Championships. Tuñacao won the Flyweight Lineage Championship from Medgoen Singsurat, who won the title by knocking out Manny Pacquiao. Pacquiao would later become the number one pound for pound fighter in the world. Wonjongkam won by first-round TKO after knocking Tuñacao down three times.

In his fourth Lineal and WBC Flyweight title defense, on April 19, 2002, Wonjongkam knocked out Japanese flyweight titleholder Daisuke Naito in 34 seconds. This knockout set the record for fastest knockout in division history.

On November 17, 2006, Wonjongkam defeated South African boxer Monelisi Mhikiza Myekeni by unanimous decision. Wonjongkam set the flyweight division record for consecutive title defenses, 16, with this victory. He then successfully defended his title against Tomonobu Shimizu, after Shibizu retired on his stool between the 6th and 7th rounds. Shibizu was the 16th boxer Wonjonkgam defended his title against, establishing another flyweight record.

Wonjongkam was ranked number ten in Ring magazine's pound-for-pound rankings, but Jermain Taylor bumped him off the list on June 18, 2006. Wonjongkam was ranked as The Ring's number one flyweight until his loss to Daisuke Naito in 2007.

=== Losing the Title ===
Wonjongkam suffered a shocking upset decision loss to Daisuke Naito in July, 2007, ending his long run as champion. Wonjongkam had defeated Naito twice in previous titles defenses. On March 8, 2008, Wonjongkam faced Naito in a rematch which ended in a draw.

=== Wonjongkam vs. Miranda ===
Wonjongkam won the vacant Interim WBC Flyweight Championship in a bout against Mexican Julio César Miranda on April 24, 2009. The 12 round bout ended by a unanimous decision. Wonjongkam defended his interim title against Takahisa Masuda by knockout, setting the stage for a bout against Lineal WBC Flyweight Champion Koki Kameda, who had recently defeated Naito to win the title.

=== Recapturing the WBC Flyweight Championship ===
On March 27, 2010, Wonjongkam fought Lineal Champion, Koki Kameda, to unify the WBC Flyweight Championship and Interim WBC Flyweight Championship. The winner would also claim the vacant The Ring Flyweight Championship. Wonjongkam defeated Kameda by a 12-round majority decision to become the WBC and Ring Flyweight Champion.

=== Losing the WBC Flyweight Championship ===
On March 2, 2012, Wonjongkam lost his Lineal, The Ring and WBC Flyweight Titles in an upset technical knockout stoppage to Sonny Boy Jaro of Philippines. He was knocked down five times before the fight was stopped in the sixth round.

=== Later career ===
Wonjongkam won the vacant WBC International flyweight title against Hyobu Nakagama on August 31, 2012. However, he lost the title to Rey Megrino on November 1, 2012, by a third-round TKO, marking Wonjongkam's fifth defeat. Even more disappointingly for Wonjongkam, Megrino had a losing record of 17-20-3 going into this fight, and had been beaten twice before by Wonjongkam, first by ten-round UD in October 2007, and a first round stoppage in July 2010.

== Professional boxing record ==
98 fights	91 wins	5 losses
By knockout	47	3
By decision	44	2
Draws	2	

No.	Result	Record	Opponent	Type	Round, time	Date	Location	Notes
98	Win	91–5–2	Manot Comput	UD	8	8 Jun 2018	Ram 100 Thai Boxing Stadium, Ramkamhaeng, Bangkok, Thailand	Won Thai interim super-bantamweight title
97	Win	90–5–2	Falazona Fidal	UD	6	30 Aug 2013	City Hall Ground, Chonburi, Thailand	
96	Win	89–5–2	Yudi Arema	UD	6	28 Jun 2013	City Hall, Samut Songkhram, Thailand	
95	Win	88–5–2	Nimrod Daniel	TKO	1 (6), 1:18	26 Apr 2013	Khon Kaen, Thailand	
94	Loss	87–5–2	Rey Megrino	TKO	3 (12), 2:06	1 Nov 2012	Central Pavilion, Nakhon Ratchasima, Thailand	Lost WBC International flyweight title
93	Win	87–4–2	Charlie Cabilla	TKO	1 (6), 1:26	28 Sep 2012	Kad Choengdoi, Chiang Mai, Thailand	
92	Win	86–4–2	Hyobu Nakagama	UD	12	31 Aug 2012	Nakhon Si Thammarat, Thailand	Won vacant WBC International flyweight title
91	Win	85–4–2	Lee Ji-Hun	TKO	4 (6)	27 Jul 2012	Amphawa District Office, Samut Songkhram, Thailand	
90	Win	84–4–2	Tubis	KO	3 (6)	31 May 2012	City Hall Ground, Chonburi, Thailand	
89	Loss	83–4–2	Sonny Boy Jaro	TKO	6 (12)	2 Mar 2012	Chonburi, Thailand	Lost WBC and The Ring flyweight titles
88	Draw	83–3–2	Hirofumi Mukai	TD	1 (12), 0:47	23 Dec 2011	11th Royal Infantry Regiment, Bangkok, Thailand	Retained WBC and The Ring flyweight titles
87	Win	83–3–1	Édgar Sosa	UD	12	21 Oct 2011	11th Royal Infantry Regiment, Bangkok, Thailand	Retained WBC and The Ring flyweight titles
86	Win	82–3–1	Pakasit Twins Gym	TKO	1 (6), 0:59	4 Aug 2011	Central Sports Stadium, Nakhon Ratchasima, Thailand	
85	Win	81–3–1	Takuya Kogawa	UD	12	1 Jul 2011	Hat Yai, Songkhla, Thailand	Retained WBC and The Ring flyweight titles
84	Win	80–3–1	Muhammad Nurfawaid	TKO	5 (6)	25 Mar 2011	Sara Buri, Thailand	
83	Win	79–3–1	Ego Yohan	KO	3 (6), 2:15	28 Jan 2011	Khao Thong Temple, Nakhon Sawan, Thailand	
82	Win	78–3–1	Heri Purnomo	TKO	4 (6), 0:49	6 Jan 2011	Central Stadium, Nakhon Phanom, Thailand	
81	Win	77–3–1	Suriyan Sor Rungvisai	UD	12	8 Oct 2010	Muang, Srisaket, Thailand	Retained WBC and The Ring flyweight titles
80	Win	76–3–1	Rey Megrino	TKO	1 (10), 1:37	2 Jul 2010	Sanam Chan Royal Palace, Nakhon Pathom, Thailand	
79	Win	75–3–1	Kōki Kameda	MD	12	27 Mar 2010	Ariake Colosseum, Tokyo, Japan	Won WBC and vacant The Ring flyweight titles
78	Win	74–3–1	Rodel Tejares	UD	6	2 Dec 2009	Vocational College, Ubon Ratchathani, Thailand	
77	Win	73–3–1	Takahisa Masuda	TKO	6 (12), 1:06	28 Aug 2009	Chiang Mai, Thailand	Retained WBC interim flyweight title
76	Win	72–3–1	Julio César Miranda	UD	12	24 Apr 2009	Chachoengsao, Thailand	Won WBC interim flyweight title
75	Win	71–3–1	Shahram Toradide	KO	2 (6)	30 Jan 2009	Bangkok University, Bangkok, Thailand	
74	Win	70–3–1	Amir Jordan	UD	6	8 Dec 2008	Thabo, Nong Khai, Thailand	
73	Win	69–3–1	Danny Sutton	TKO	2 (6)	31 Oct 2008	Chokchai Four, Bangkapi, Bangkok, Thailand	
72	Win	68–3–1	Akbar Mohammadpour	TKO	6 (10)	25 Sep 2008	Wat Pakbung, Minburi, Bangkok, Thailand	
71	Draw	67–3–1	Daisuke Naito	SD	12	8 Mar 2008	Kokugikan, Tokyo, Japan	For WBC flyweight title
70	Win	67–3	Jack Amisa	KO	2 (10)	27 Nov 2007	Thabo, Nong Khai, Thailand	
69	Win	66–3	Rey Megrino	UD	10	24 Oct 2007	Bangplee, Thailand	
68	Loss	65–3	Daisuke Naito	UD	12	18 Jul 2007	Korakuen Hall, Tokyo, Japan	Lost WBC flyweight title
67	Win	65–2	Tomonobu Shimizu	RTD	7 (12), 3:00	6 Apr 2007	Tabkwang Stadium, Sara Buri, Thailand	Retained WBC flyweight title
66	Win	64–2	Lito Sisnorio	TKO	4 (10), 2:15	26 Jan 2007	City Hall, Tak, Thailand	
65	Win	63–2	Monelisi Mhikiza Myekeni	UD	12	17 Nov 2006	Suranaree Stadium, Nakhon Ratchasima, Thailand	Retained WBC flyweight title
64	Win	62–2	Everardo Morales	TKO	4 (12), 0:55	30 Jun 2006	Siam Paragon Center, Bangkok, Thailand	Retained WBC flyweight title
63	Win	61–2	Daigo Nakahiro	UD	12	1 May 2006	11th Inf Reg, Bangkok, Thailand	Retained WBC flyweight title
62	Win	60–2	Gilberto Keb Baas	UD	12	16 Feb 2006	Sankhaburi, Chainat, Thailand	Retained WBC flyweight title
61	Win	59–2	Isidro Balabat	TD	5 (10)	23 Dec 2005	Rajabhak University, Petchaboon, Thailand	
60	Win	58–2	Daisuke Naito	TD	7 (12), 2:38	10 Oct 2005	Korakuen Hall, Tokyo, Japan	Retained WBC flyweight title
59	Win	57–2	Mark Sales	UD	6	29 Jul 2005	Sukhumwit Market, Bangkok, Thailand	
58	Win	56–2	Daniel Diolan	TKO	3 (6)	29 Apr 2005	Petchpaiboon Market, Petchaburi, Thailand	
57	Win	55–2	Noriyuki Komatsu	TKO	5 (12), 1:42	29 Jan 2005	Prefectural Gymnasium, Osaka, Japan	Retained WBC flyweight title
56	Win	54–2	Sherwin Manatad	UD	8	26 Nov 2004	Chiengsaen, Chiang Rai, Thailand	
55	Win	53–2	Randy Mangubat	UD	10	8 Oct 2004	Arcadia Hilton Hotel, Phuket, Thailand	
54	Win	52–2	Luis Angel Martinez	TKO	5 (12), 1:49	15 Jul 2004	Khon Kaen, Thailand	Retained WBC flyweight title
53	Win	51–2	Ronnie Canete	TKO	3 (10)	30 Apr 2004	Nakhon Ratchasima, Thailand	
52	Win	50–2	Trash Nakanuma	UD	12	3 Jan 2004	Pacifico Yokohama, Yokohama, Kanagawa, Japan	Retained WBC flyweight title
51	Win	49–2	Hussein Hussein	UD	12	14 Nov 2003	Lumpinee Boxing Stadium, Bangkok, Thailand	Retained WBC flyweight title
50	Win	48–2	Jaime Acerda	KO	9 (10)	25 Jul 2003	City Hall, Chaiyaphum, Thailand	
49	Win	47–2	Randy Mangubat	UD	12	5 Jun 2003	Songkhla, Thailand	Retained WBC flyweight title
48	Win	46–2	Hidenobu Honda	UD	12	26 Nov 2002	Prefectural Gymnasium, Osaka, Japan	Retained WBC flyweight title
47	Win	45–2	Jesús Martínez	UD	12	6 Sep 2002	Future Park Plaza, Rangsit, Thailand	Retained WBC flyweight title
46	Win	44–2	Daisuke Naito	KO	1 (12), 0:34	19 Apr 2002	Provincial Gymnasium, Khon Kaen, Thailand	Retained WBC flyweight title
45	Win	43–2	Luis Alberto Lazarte	TKO	2 (12), 2:43	6 Dec 2001	Jomtien Hotel, Pattaya, Thailand	Retained WBC flyweight title
44	Win	42–2	Alex Baba	TD	8 (12), 2:35	26 Oct 2001	Indoor Basketball Gymnasium, Hat Yai, Thailand	Retained WBC flyweight title
43	Win	41–2	Hayato Asai	TKO	5 (12), 0:47	15 Jul 2001	Aichi Budokan, Nagoya, Aichi, Japan	Retained WBC flyweight title
42	Win	40–2	Alvin Felicilda	UD	10	8 May 2001	Udon Thani, Thailand	
41	Win	39–2	Malcolm Tuñacao	TKO	1 (12), 2:42	2 Mar 2001	Phichit, Thailand	Won WBC flyweight title
40	Win	38–2	Ramil Anito	TKO	5 (10)	29 Dec 2000	Koh Kong Island, Cambodia	
39	Win	37–2	Nathan Barcelona	TD	7 (10)	22 Sep 2000	Sara Buri, Thailand	
38	Win	36–2	Gener Milla	TKO	3	25 Aug 2000	Sakon Nakhon, Thailand	
37	Win	35–2	Ramil Anito	UD	6	1 Jul 2000	Nakhon Pathom, Thailand	
36	Win	34–2	Texas Gomez	KO	7	19 May 2000	Srimnang Outdoor Arena, Udon Thani, Thailand	
35	Win	33–2	Mark Sales	UD	10	17 Mar 2000	Roi Et, Thailand	
34	Win	32–2	Joven Simbajon	PTS	8	25 Feb 2000	Mahachai Villa Arena, Samut Sakhon, Thailand	
33	Win	31–2	Armando Rocil	KO	2	29 Jan 2000	Bangkok, Thailand	
32	Win	30–2	Ritichai Kiatprapas	KO	3	25 Dec 1999	Bangkok, Thailand	
31	Win	29–2	Rolando Baclayo	KO	6	12 Nov 1999	Sara Buri, Thailand	
30	Win	28–2	Randy Mangubat	UD	10	17 Sep 1999	Pakpanag Metropolitan Stadium, Nakhon Si Thammarat, Thailand	
29	Win	27–2	Texas Gomez	KO	3	23 Jul 1999	Yala, Thailand	
28	Win	26–2	Jose Orozco	KO	2	13 Jun 1999	Bangkok, Thailand	
27	Win	25–2	Dennis Sabsal	UD	8	30 Apr 1999	Thung Song, Thailand	
26	Win	24–2	Emer Barrientos	UD	10	5 Feb 1999	Pattalung, Thailand	
25	Win	23–2	Roy Tarazona	PTS	8	4 Dec 1998	Tonsuk College Ground, Phutthamonthon, Thailand	
24	Win	22–2	Allan Llanita	PTS	6	14 Nov 1998	Bangkok, Thailand	
24	Win	21–2	Ramil Gevero	PTS	10	23 Oct 1998	Sakon Nakhon, Thailand	
22	Win	20–2	Dennis Sabsal	UD	10	30 Jul 1998	Bangkok, Thailand	
21	Win	19–2	Juanito Rubillar	UD	10	5 Jun 1998	Bangkok, Thailand	
20	Win	18–2	Rudolfo Fernandez	KO	2	22 Apr 1998	Bangkok, Thailand	
19	Win	17–2	Jerry Pahayahay	UD	10	27 Feb 1998	Specially Built Arena, Ko Samui, Thailand	
18	Win	16–2	Alpong Navaja	PTS	10	12 Nov 1997	Bangkok, Thailand	
17	Win	15–2	Ramil Gevero	PTS	10	26 Sep 1997	Provincial Stadium, Sara Buri, Thailand	
16	Win	14–2	Jaime Aliguin	UD	10	1 Aug 1997	Prince Palace Hotel, Chantaburi, Thailand	
15	Win	13–2	Lolito Laroa	PTS	6	9 May 1997	Prince Palace Hotel, Bangkok, Thailand	
14	Win	12–2	Mzukisi Sikali	TKO	1 (12)	28 Mar 1997	Pakkred Stadium, Nonthaburi, Thailand	Won WBU light-flyweight title
13	Win	11–2	Roy Tarazona	TKO	3 (8)	22 Nov 1996	Provincial Stadium, Surin, Thailand	
12	Win	10–2	Randy Mangubat	KO	3 (10)	4 Oct 1996	Provincial Stadium, Roi-Et, Thailand	
11	Loss	9–2	Jerry Pahayahay	KO	7 (10)	11 Jul 1996	Kalasin, Thailand	
10	Win	9–1	Juanito Rubillar	KO	4 (6)	24 May 1996	Vichean Buri, Petchaboon, Thailand	
9	Win	8–1	Ramon Algora	KO	3 (6)	4 Apr 1996	Koompavapi school, Udon Thani, Thailand	
8	Loss	7–1	Jerry Pahayahay	UD	8	22 Dec 1995	Sakon Nakhon, Thailand	
7	Win	7–0	Ramil Gevero	TKO	5	5 Nov 1995	Sara Buri, Thailand	
6	Win	6–0	Alpong Navaja	TKO	4	25 Sep 1995	Bangkok, Thailand	
5	Win	5–0	Bernardo Jun Davalos	KO	2	27 Aug 1995	Rangsit, Thailand	
4	Win	4–0	Rolando Tadle	KO	4	14 May 1995	Lampang, Thailand	
3	Win	3–0	Rex Remias	KO	1	27 Apr 1995	Bangkok, Thailand	
2	Win	2–0	Al Tarazona	TKO	8	12 Mar 1995	Phitsanulok, Thailand	
1	Win	1–0	Bernardo Jun Davalos	KO	3	21 Dec 1994	Thansettakit Building, Bangkok, Thailand	

== Titles in boxing ==
Major World Titles:

- WBC flyweight champion (112 lbs) (2x)

Minor World Titles:

- WBU light-flyweight champion (108 lbs)

Lineal Championship Titles:

- Lineal flyweight champion (112 lbs) (2x)

The Ring magazine titles:

- The Ring flyweight champion (112 lbs)

Interim titles:

- WBC interim flyweight champion (112 lbs)

Regional/International Titles:

- WBC International flyweight champion (112 lbs)

== Other names ==
- Pongsaklek Sitkanongsak
- Pongsaklek Singwancha
- Pongsaklek Kratingdaenggym
- Pongsaklek Petchyindee
- Pongsaklek Kaiyanghadaogym

== See also ==
- List of world flyweight boxing champions

== Notes and references ==
Sporting positions
World boxing titles
Preceded by Malcolm Tuñacao	WBC flyweight champion March 2, 2001 – July 18, 2007	Succeeded by Daisuke Naito
Vacant Title last held by Jorge Arce	WBC flyweight champion Interim title April 24, 2009 – March 27, 2010; Won full title	Vacant Title next held by McWilliams Arroyo
Preceded by Kōki Kameda	WBC flyweight champion March 27, 2010 – March 2, 2012	Succeeded by Sonny Boy Jaro
Vacant Title last held by Kim Yong-kang	The Ring flyweight champion March 27, 2010 – March 2, 2012	Succeeded by Sonny Boy Jaro
