= Malcolm Tuñacao =

Filipino boxer

Personal information
- Nickname: Eagle Eye
- Nationality: Filipino
- Born: Malcolm Alindajao Tuñacao; 8 December 1977 (age 48) Mandaue City, Cebu, Philippines
- Height: 5 ft 6 in (1.68 m)
- Weight: Bantamweight

Boxing career
- Reach: 67 in (170 cm)
- Stance: Southpaw

Boxing record
- Total fights: 41
- Wins: 35
- Win by KO: 20
- Losses: 3
- Draws: 3

Malcolm Alindajao Tuñacao (born December 8, 1977, in Cambaro, Mandaue City, Philippines) is a professional southpaw boxer in the flyweight division. He is a former WBC and lineal flyweight champion.

== Fight career ==
Tuñacao was a several time national champion in the amateur ranks while he was still under the careful watch of the eminent ALA Boxing Club. Poverty, however, compelled the Cebuano southpaw, a father of three, to venture into the pro arena, hoping to earn considerable money to sustain the daily living of his family.

On August 1, 1998, Tuñacao, known as "Eagle Eye", officially turned pro along with current WBC ranked #5 and then Filipino super featherweight champion Randy Suico and OPBF welterweight king Rev Santillan. They were then monickered as "The Golden Boys of Cebu Boxing". Tuñacao wrested the Filipino flyweight crown with a 12-round unanimous decision win over Rio Sumampong on September 25, 1998, in Talisay City. In 2000, he became the Lineal and WBC flyweight champion with a 7th round TKO win over Medgoen Singsurat of Thailand. The following year, he lost the titles to Pongsaklek Wonjongkam via a TKO in the 1st round.

He lost to Shinsuke Yamanaka via knockout in the twelfth round with the WBC Bantamweight title on the line on April 8, 2013.

== Personal ==
As of August 2020, Malcolm has relocated to Japan with intentions to stay there permanently after he got together with a Japanese woman.

== Professional boxing record ==
41 fights	35 wins	3 losses
By knockout	20	2
By decision	14	1
By disqualification	1	0
Draws	3	

No.	Result	Record	Opponent	Type	Round	Date	Location	Notes
41	Win	35–3–3	Ryuta Otsuka	TD	5 (8), 1:56	Sep 16, 2014	Korakuen Hall, Tokyo, Japan	
40	Win	34–3–3	Joo Hyun Jung	UD	8	May 22, 2014	Shimazu Arena, Kyoto, Japan	
39	Win	33–3–3	Likit Chane	TD	5 (8), 1:41	Sep 11, 2013	Prefectural Gymnasium, Osaka, Japan	
38	Loss	32–3–3	Shinsuke Yamanaka	TKO	12 (12), 1:57	Apr 8, 2013	Kokugikan, Tokyo, Japan	For WBC bantamweight title
37	Win	32–2–3	Christian Esquivel	TKO	7 (12), 2:10	Dec 22, 2012	Central Gym, Kobe, Japan	
36	Win	31–2–3	Martin Mubiru	UD	8	Sep 15, 2012	International Conference Hall, Nagoya, Japan	
35	Win	30–2–3	Yuki Takemoto	TKO	4 (8)	Mar 3, 2012	Central Gym, Kobe, Japan	
34	Win	29–2–3	Buaphan Khamrang	TKO	4 (8)	Oct 21, 2011	Central Gym, Kobe, Japan	
33	Win	28–2–3	Daigo Nakahiro	TKO	6 (12), 2:32	Feb 5, 2011	Prefectural Gymnasium, Osaka, Japan	Retained OPBF bantamweight title
32	Win	27–2–3	Hidenobu Honda	TKO	5 (12), 1:28	Nov 2, 2010	Bunka Hall, Kobe, Japan	Retained OPBF bantamweight title
31	Win	26–2–3	Kohei Oba	UD	12	Jul 11, 2010	International Conference Hall, Nagoya, Japan	Retained OPBF bantamweight title
30	Win	25–2–3	Seung Suk Chae	SD	12	Feb 6, 2010	Gymnasium, Mungyeong, South Korea	Won vacant OPBF bantamweight title
29	Win	24–2–3	Takuto Nanba	UD	8	Jul 14, 2009	World Memorial Hall, Kobe, Japan	
28	Win	23–2–3	Monico Laurente	SD	12	Sep 20, 2008	Mandaue City Plaza Square, Mandaue City, Philippines	
27	Win	22–2–3	Rashidi Ally Kondo	TKO	1 (10), 2:48	May 31, 2008	Cebu City Waterfront Hotel & Casino, Cebu City, Philippines	
26	Loss	21–2–3	Rolly Lunas	TD	10 (12), 3:00	Jan 13, 2007	Korakuen Hall, Tokyo, Japan	Lost OPBF bantamweight title
25	Win	21–1–3	Masahito Ikawa	UD	10	Nov 11, 2006	Korakuen Hall, Tokyo, Japan	
24	Win	20–1–3	Yasuo Kijima	TKO	11 (12), 2:04	May 6, 2006	Korakuen Hall, Tokyo, Japan	Retained OPBF bantamweight title
23	Draw	19–1–3	Kohei Oba	SD	12	Feb 5, 2006	International Conference Hall, Nagoya, Japan	Retained OPBF bantamweight title
22	Win	19–1–2	Kumarnthong Por Pluemkamol	UD	12	Nov 19, 2005	Korakuen Hall, Tokyo, Japan	Won OPBF bantamweight title
21	Win	18–1–2	Ryoichi Hidaka	TKO	7 (10)	Jul 18, 2005	Central Gym, Osaka, Japan	
20	Win	17–1–2	Takafumi Himeno	TKO	9 (10), 2:43	Feb 14, 2005	Korakuen Hall, Tokyo, Japan	
19	Win	16–1–2	Bernardo Oclos	UD	10	Sep 19, 2004	Mandaue City Sports and Cultural Complex, Mandaue City, Philippines	
18	Win	15–1–2	Ringgo Jaguar	KO	5 (12)	Sep 26, 2003	Ynares Sports Center, Antipolo, Philippines	Won vacant WBC International super flyweight title
17	Win	14–1–2	Kazuyoshi Niki	TKO	3 (10)	Nov 18, 2002	Kokura Izutsuya Pastel Hall, Kitakyushu, Japan	
16	Win	13–1–2	Kakhar Sabitov	TKO	4 (10), 2:26	Jul 26, 2002	Cebu City Waterfront Hotel & Casino, Cebu City, Philippines	
15	Win	12–1–2	Somchai Thonnongvang	RTD	6 (10), 3:00	Feb 8, 2002	Cebu City Waterfront Hotel & Casino, Cebu City, Philippines	
14	Draw	11–1–2	Randy Mangubat	TD	4 (12)	Jul 28, 2001	PAGCOR Grand Theater, Airport Casino Filipino, Paranaque City, Philippines	For WBC International flyweight title
13	Loss	11–1–1	Pongsaklek Wonjongkam	TKO	1 (12), 2:42	Mar 2, 2001	Phichit, Thailand	Lost WBC flyweight title
12	Draw	11–0–1	Celes Kobayashi	SD	12	Aug 20, 2000	Kokugikan, Tokyo, Japan	Retained WBC flyweight title
11	Win	11–0	Medgoen Singsurat	TKO	7 (12), 1:53	May 19, 2000	Srimnang Outdoor Arena, Udon Thani, Thailand	Won WBC flyweight title
10	Win	10–0	Buddy Ledama	DQ	3 (12)	Jan 29, 2000	New Cebu Coliseum, Cebu City, Philippines	
9	Win	9–0	Rio Sumampong	UD	12	Sep 25, 1999	Talisay City Sports Complex, Talisay City, Philippines	
8	Win	8–0	Mateo Baring	KO	3 (10)	May 30, 1999	Barangay Basak San Nicolas, Cebu City, Philippines	
7	Win	7–0	Junric Velono	TKO	2 (10), 2:42	Apr 30, 1999	Cebu City, Philippines	
6	Win	6–0	Emer Barrientos	RTD	1 (10), 3:00	Mar 20, 1999	Mandaue City, Philippines	
5	Win	5–0	Nelson Mantos	TKO	3 (10), 1:19	Feb 27, 1999	New Cebu Coliseum, Cebu City, Philippines	
4	Win	4–0	Zosimo Delgado	UD	10	Jan 15, 1999	New Cebu Coliseum, Cebu City, Philippines	
3	Win	3–0	Alpong Navaja	UD	10	Nov 28, 1998	Mandaue City Sports and Cultural Complex, Mandaue City, Philippines	
2	Win	2–0	Marlon Gayundato	TKO	4 (6)	Sep 26, 1998	Mandaue City, Philippines	
1	Win	1–0	Manuel Ferego	TKO	2 (6)	Aug 1, 1998	Mandaue City, Philippines	

== See also ==
- List of flyweight boxing champions
- List of WBC world champions
- List of Filipino boxing world champions

Achievements
Preceded by Medgoen Singsurat	Lineal Flyweight Champion; 19 May 2000 – 2 Mar 2001	Succeeded by Pongsaklek Wonjongkam
Preceded by Medgoen Singsurat	WBC Flyweight Champion; 19 May 2000 – 2 Mar 2001	Succeeded by Pongsaklek Wonjongkam
