= Tepparith Singwancha =

Thai boxer

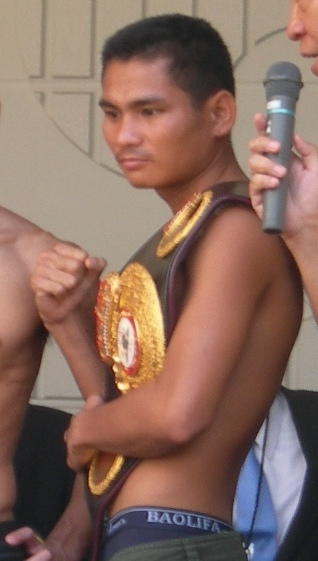
- Tepparith in 2012

Personal information
- Nicknames: Astro Boy; Japan Killer
- Born: Panthep Mullipoom (พันธุ์เทพ มุลลีปุ้ม); November 22, 1988 (age 37) Kosum Phisai, Maha Sarakham, Thailand
- Height: 5 ft 3 in (160 cm)
- Weight: Flyweight; Super flyweight

Boxing career
- Reach: 67 1/2 in (171 cm)
- Stance: Orthodox

Boxing record
- Total fights: 38
- Wins: 35
- Win by KO: 22
- Losses: 3

Tepparith Singwancha or Tepparith Kokietgym (Thai: เทพฤทธิ์ สิงห์วังชา, เทพฤทธิ์ ก่อเกียรติยิม, born November 22, 1988) is a Thai former professional boxer in the super flyweight division. He was the World Boxing Association (WBA) super flyweight champion from 2011 to 2012.

== Boxing career ==
Singwancha won the interim title on May 1, 2011, in Phetchaburi against Drian Francisco and was elevated to full champion in November of that year.

He beat Japanese boxers in Japan three consecutive times, facing Daiki Kameda (December 2011), Tomonobu Shimizu (April 2012; eliminator fight), and Nobuo Nashiro (September 2012), he earned a nickname from Japanese journalists "Japan Killer".

At the end of 2012, he was defeated by TKO (referee stopped the contest, judging that Tepparith wasn't in position to continue fighting after being knocked down three times) in the fourth round against Kohei Kono at Ota-City General Gymnasium, Tokyo.

== Kickboxing career ==
Before starting his boxing career Tepparith trained and competed in Muay Thai under the name Theparith Wor.Singsanae (เทพฤทธิ์ ว.สิงห์เสน่ห์), he had over 200 fights for 160 wins. After the end of his professional boxing career in 2016, Tepparith went to live in Japan to work as a trainer and started competing in kickboxing rules under the ring name "Tepparith JoeGym" (テーパリット・ジョウジム). After two quick first round KO wins Tepparith faced high level competition in RISE champion Masahiko Suzuki who he fought at RISE World Series 2021 Osaka on July 17, 2021. He lost by unanimous decision.

== Professional boxing record ==
38 fights	35 wins	3 losses
By knockout	22	1
By decision	13	2

No.	Result	Record	Opponent	Type	Round, time	Date	Location	Notes
38	Win	35–3	Junior Bajawa	RTD	6 (12), 3:00	26 May 2016	Lam Luk Ka District, Thailand	
37	Win	34–3	Tommy Seran	KO	5 (12), 2:22	27 Mar 2016	Phang Nga Province, Thailand	
36	Win	33–3	Matthis Bernot	TKO	6 (6)	26 Feb 2016	Wat Kokkuod, Surin, Thailand	
35	Win	32–3	Jemmy Gobel	UD	6	25 Dec 2015	Maejo University, Chiang Mai, Thailand	
34	Win	31–3	Boido Simanjuntak	UD	6	25 Sep 2015	Prachuap Khiri Khan, Thailand	
33	Win	30–3	Ricky Manufoe	KO	2 (12)	24 Jul 2015	Bang Bua Thong District, Thailand	
32	Win	29–3	Hendrik Barongsay	KO	3 (6)	12 May 2015	Bangkok, Thailand	
31	Win	28–3	Xinyu Wang	KO	3 (6)	18 Apr 2015	Pattaya Boxing World, Pattaya, Thailand	
30	Win	27–3	Joaquim Mahe	UD	6	14 Feb 2015	Pattaya Boxing World, Pattaya, Thailand	
29	Win	26–3	Alvin Bais	KO	9 (12), 2:12	21 Feb 2014	Sawan Vegas Hotel, Savannakhet, Laos	Retained WBC Asian Continental bantamweight title
28	Win	25–3	Ricky Manufoe	TKO	2 (12), 2:38	27 Dec 2013	Indo-China Market, Mukdahan, Thailand	Won vacant PABA bantamweight title
27	Win	24–3	Shusong Zhuang	TKO	5 (12)	4 Oct 2013	Ban Rai Temple, Nakhon Ratchasima, Thailand	Won vacant WBC Asian Continental bantamweight title
26	Win	23–3	Jecker Buhawe	UD	12	10 May 2013	Wat Punoi, Ban Mi, Thailand	
25	Win	22–3	Daiboy Sajiro	UD	12	8 Mar 2013	Khian Sa District, Thailand	
24	Loss	21–3	Kohei Kono	KO	4 (12), 2:08	31 Dec 2012	Ota City General Gymnasium, Tokyo, Japan	Lost WBA super-flyweight title
23	Win	21–2	Nobuo Nashiro	MD	12	1 Sep 2012	Saneiwork Sumiyoshi Sports Center, Osaka, Japan	Retained WBA super-flyweight title
22	Win	20–2	Tomonobu Shimizu	TKO	9 (12), 2:15	4 Apr 2012	Yokohama Arena, Yokohama, Japan	Retained WBA super-flyweight title
21	Win	19–2	Daiki Kameda	UD	12	7 Dec 2011	Osaka Prefectural Gymnasium, Osaka, Japan	Retained WBA super-flyweight title
20	Win	18–2	Drian Francisco	UD	12	1 May 2011	Benjamatheputid School, Phetchaburi, Thailand	Won interim WBA super-flyweight title
19	Win	17–2	Rodel Tejares	UD	6	11 Mar 2011	Pak Klong Village Office, Pathio District, Thailand	
18	Win	16–2	Michael Rodriguez	UD	12	13 Feb 2011	Koh Lanta, Krabi Province, Thailand	Retained PABA flyweight title
17	Win	15–2	Rino Ukru	TKO	2 (6)	9 Dec 2010	My Airport Housing Complex, Bangkok, Thailand	
16	Win	14–2	Along Denoy	TKO	7 (12), 1:54	24 Oct 2010	Wat Chedi Hoi, Pathum Thani, Thailand	Retained PABA flyweight title
15	Win	13–2	Rey Megrino	TKO	6 (12), 1:17	9 Sep 2010	The Mall Ngamwongwan, Nonthaburi, Thailand	Retained PABA flyweight title
14	Win	12–2	Anis Ceunfin	RTD	5 (12), 3:00	9 Aug 2010	Phra Pradaeng Plaza, Phra Pradaeng, Thailand	Retained PABA and WBO Asia Pacific flyweight titles
13	Win	11–2	Mating Kilakil	RTD	6 (12), 3:00	11 Jun 2010	Phetchaburi, Thailand	Won vacant PABA & WBO Asia Pacific flyweight titles
12	Win	10–2	Ryan Tampus	TKO	3 (12)	26 Mar 2010	Karama Beach, Phuket, Thailand	
11	Win	9–2	Apol Suico	TKO	1 (6), 1:15	23 Feb 2010	Bird Park, Chai Nat, Thailand	
10	Win	8–2	Nino Suelo	UD	11	25 Dec 2009	Bangplama School, Suphan Buri, Thailand	
9	Win	7–2	Ryan Maliteg	KO	2 (6)	5 Oct 2009	Ban Rai School, Nakhon Ratchasima, Thailand	
8	Win	6–2	Worawatchai Boonjan	TKO	2 (6)	11 Aug 2009	Muang Temple, Bangkok, Thailand	
7	Win	5–2	Amnat Daengphayap	KO	3 (6)	30 Jun 2009	Bueng Khong Long, Nong Khai, Thailand	
6	Win	4–2	Yotchanchai Yakaeo	PTS	6	23 Mar 2009	Lotus Shopping Centre, Lopburi, Thailand	
5	Loss	3–2	Suriyan Kaikanha	PTS	6	12 Dec 2008	Nong Mamong District, Thailand	
4	Win	3–1	Samson Sor Tanapinyo	KO	2 (6)	17 Oct 2008	Krabang School, Bangkok, Thailand	
3	Loss	2–1	Chanasak Kiatsakthanee	PTS	6	23 May 2008	Ayutthaya, Thailand	
2	Win	2–0	Khamhaeng Phanmee	PTS	6	29 Apr 2008	Chiang Mai, Thailand	
1	Win	1–0	Chanasuk Sor Samranchai	TKO	3 (6)	17 Jan 2008	Nonthaburi Female High-School, Nonthaburi, Thailand	

== Kickboxing and Muay Thai record ==
Kickboxing record
Date	Result	Opponent	Event	Location	Method	Round	Time
2022-02-23	Loss	(Japan) Kazuma	RISE 155	Tokyo, Japan	TKO (Punches)	2	1:10
2021-11-28	Win	(Japan) Hiroto ichimura	Rizin Trigger 1	Kobe, Japan	KO (Right hook)	2	2:54
2021-07-18	Loss	(Japan) Masahiko Suzuki	RISE WORLD SERIES 2021 Osaka	Osaka, Japan	Decision (Unanimous)	3	3:00
2020-06-06	Win	(Japan) Minoru Asahino	Kakutou no Omochabako ACF 60th ～Living legendary fighters～	Osaka, Japan	KO	1	2:55
2020-12-20	Win	(Japan) Taichi Morimoto	Kakutou no Omochabako ACF 55th	Osaka, Japan	TKO (Punches)	1	2:32
2018-12-16	Loss	(Japan) Kiyoto Takahashi	Japan Kickboxing Innovation - Okayama Gym show 5, Quarter Final	Okayama, Japan	Decision (Unanimous)	3	3:00
Legend: Win Loss Draw/No contest Notes

== See also ==
- List of world super-flyweight boxing champions

Sporting positions
Regional boxing titles
Vacant Title last held by Denkaosan Kaovichit	PABA flyweight champion June 11, 2010 – May 1, 2011; Won interim title	Vacant Title next held by Denchailek Kratingdaenggym
Vacant Title last held by Wandee Singwangcha	WBO Asia Pacific flyweight Champion; June 11, 2010 – May 1, 2011; Won interim title	Vacant Title next held by Froilan Saludar
Vacant Title last held by Sodsai Phankamkerd	WBC Asian Continental bantamweight champion October 4, 2013 – 2014; Vacated	Vacant Title next held by Saenganan Sithsaithong
Vacant Title last held by Tabtimdaeng Na Rachawat	PABA bantamweight champion December 27, 2013 – 2014; Vacated	Vacant Title next held by Boonsom Yiamsiri
World boxing titles
Preceded by Drian Francisco	WBA super-flyweight champion Interim title May 1, 2011 – November 10, 2011; Promoted	Vacant Title next held by Liborio Solís
Preceded by Tomonobu Shimizu; Status changed	WBA super-flyweight champion November 10, 2011 – December 31, 2012	Succeeded by Kohei Kono
