= Kōki Kameda =

Japanese boxer (born 1986)

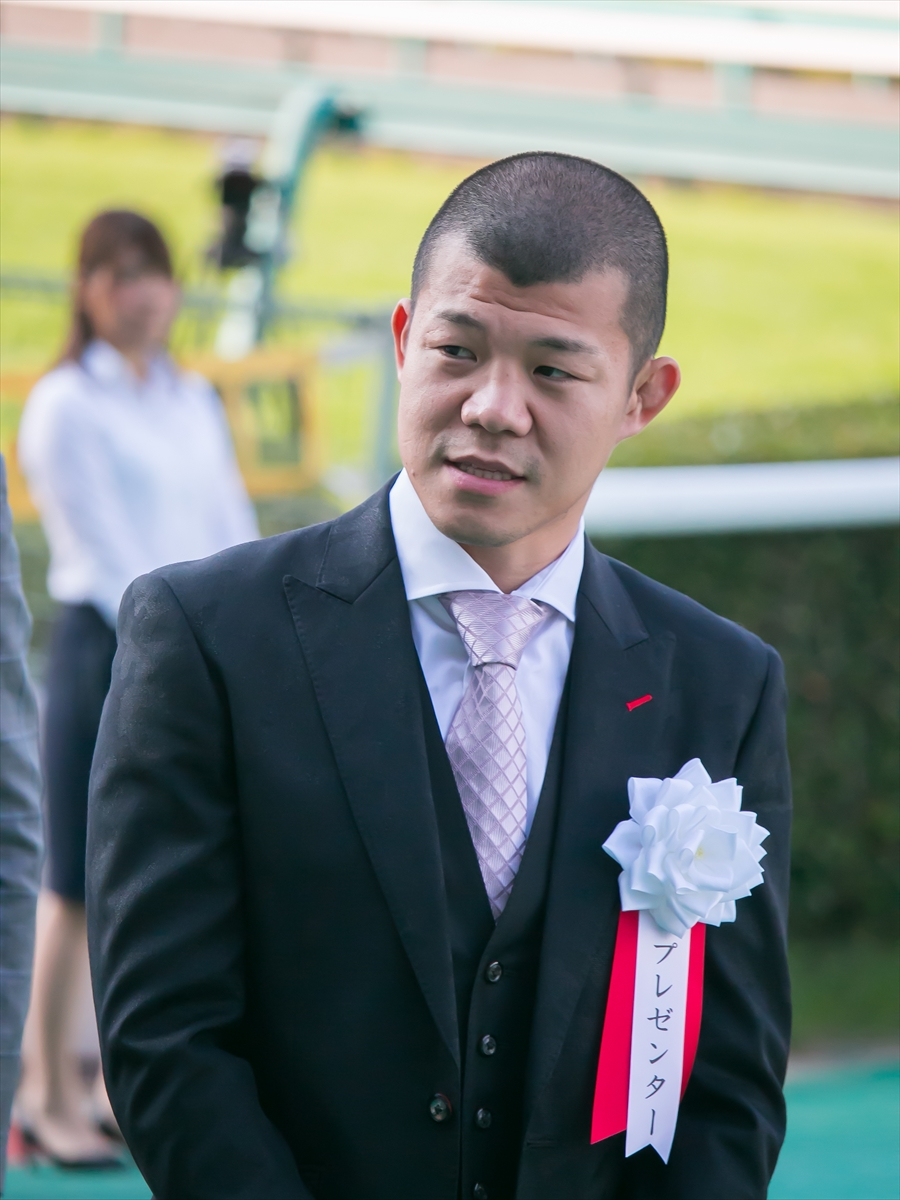

Personal information
- Nickname: Naniwa no Tōken (浪速乃闘拳) "The Fighting Fist of Naniwa"
- Nationality: Japanese
- Born: November 17, 1986 (age 39) Osaka, Japan
- Height: 1.66 m (5 ft 5 in)
- Weight: Light-flyweight; Flyweight; Super-flyweight; Bantamweight

Boxing career
- Reach: 1.68 m (66 in)
- Stance: Southpaw

Boxing record
- Total fights: 35
- Wins: 33
- Win by KO: 18
- Losses: 2

Kōki Kameda (亀田 興毅, Kameda Kōki; born November 17, 1986) is a Japanese former professional boxer who competed from 2003 to 2015. He is a two weight world champion, having held the World Boxing Association (WBA) light-flyweight title from 2006 to 2007 and the World Boxing Council (WBC) flyweight title from 2009 to 2010. He also held the WBA (Regular version) bantamweight title twice between 2010 and 2013. His younger brothers, Daiki and Tomoki, are also professional boxers.

== Amateur career ==
Back in 2000 when Kameda was only 14 years old, Kameda managed to get some national attention by taking on former two time division world champion, Hiroki Ioka, in a 2-round exhibition match. Ioka was the inaugural WBC minimumweight champion and was also the former WBA light flyweight champion, a title which Kameda himself would controversially win in August 2006. Kameda at first was believed to have got a first round knockdown on the former champion by landing a left straight and a right hook, but the referee ruled it as a slip. Kameda throughout the exhibition bout, would try to go for a knockout. However, the fight went the distance and this would jump start Kameda by going all out on the former champion.

== Professional career ==
On August 2, 2006, in his first attempt for the world title, Kameda squared off with Juan Jose Landaeta of Venezuela in Yokohama, Japan, for the World Boxing Association light flyweight title. The fight was rather controversial as Kameda won the fight in a split decision despite getting knocked down in the first round and being dominated in the final two rounds. Further fueling controversy was the fact that the Korean judge who scored the fight 114–113 in Kameda's favor gave the final round to Kameda 10–9, although the perception by most observers was that the clearly exhausted Japanese boxer did nothing but tie up his opponent and try to avoid being knocked out in that round. If the Korean judge had scored the final round in favor of Landaeta, the Venezuelan would have won the bout. The match reinforced the existence of a home field advantage and the bias a foreign fighter must face when fighting on Japanese soil.

There were mixed reactions from the Japanese public after the fight. Some 50,000 calls complaining against the decision were made to TBS (Tokyo Broadcasting System, the station that broadcast the fight) to complain about the decision. While some hailed the 19-year-old's aggressiveness and impressive technique, others believed Landaeta was obviously the better fighter and exposed Kameda's inexperience and questionable stamina. Despite the controversial nature of the decision, it was a close, bitterly contested bout. Scoring some of the very close earlier rounds for Kameda would give the young fighter the necessary buffer on the scorecards to required to win, despite Landaeta's late charge. Kameda's father and trainer's backlash against the critics went as far as death threats.

=== Rematch and defending the title ===
On December 20, 2006, in a highly anticipated rematch, Kameda decisively defeated Juan Jose Landaeta at Ariake Colosseum in Tokyo, Japan. Kameda employed a rather different boxing style from the one he used back in the title match on August. Kameda outboxed Landaeta for most of the match using his quickness and accuracy, and won by unanimous decision.

Kameda vacated his Light Flyweight Championship to move up to the Flyweight division on January 22, 2007.

=== Winning the World flyweight title ===
Koki Kameda beat Daisuke Naito on November 29, 2009, for the WBC and lineal flyweight championships.

=== Defending against Pongsaklek Wonjongkam ===
On March 27, 2010, Koki Kameda fought Wonjongkam to unify the WBC Flyweight championship and interim WBC Flyweight championship. The winner would also claim the vacant The Ring's Flyweight championship. Wonjongkam defeated Kameda by a 12-round majority decision to become the WBC, The Ring and Lineal Flyweight champion.

=== WBA Bantamweight title ===
On December 26, 2010, Kameda went up to the Bantamweight weight class and fought Alexander Munoz of Venezuela for the vacant WBA Bantamweight Regular Title. Kameda defeated Munoz by unanimous decision to win the title. In May 2012, Kameda status was changed to "Champion in Recess", as he claimed an injury that prevented him from fighting mandatory contender and Interim Champion Hugo Ruiz. Kameda was restored to Champion in November 2012, but vacated his title in December 2013, following a call for a unification match with WBA Super Champion Anselmo Moreno, in order to move down to the super flyweight division.

== Professional boxing record ==
35 fights	33 wins	2 losses
By knockout	18	0
By decision	15	2

No.	Result	Record	Opponent	Type	Round, time	Date	Location	Notes
35	Loss	33–2	Kohei Kono	UD	12	Oct 16, 2015	UIC Pavilion, Chicago, Illinois, U.S.	For WBA super-flyweight title
34	Win	33–1	Omar Salado	KO	4 (10), 2:21	Nov 1, 2014	UIC Pavilion, Chicago, Illinois, U.S.	
33	Win	32–1	Jung-Oh Son	SD	12	Nov 19, 2013	Grand Hotel, Jeju, South Korea	Retained WBA (Regular) bantamweight title
32	Win	31–1	John Mark Apolinario	UD	12	Jul 23, 2013	Big Sight, Tokyo, Japan	Retained WBA (Regular) bantamweight title
31	Win	30–1	Panomroonglek Kratingdaenggym	SD	12	Apr 7, 2013	Bodymaker Colosseum, Osaka, Japan	Retained WBA (Regular) bantamweight title
30	Win	29–1	Hugo Ruiz	SD	12	Dec 4, 2012	Bodymaker Colosseum, Osaka, Japan	Retained WBA (Regular) bantamweight title
29	Win	28–1	Noldi Manakane	UD	12	Apr 4, 2012	Yokohama Arena, Yokohama, Japan	Retained WBA (Regular) bantamweight title
28	Win	27–1	Mario Macias	TKO	4 (12), 2:04	Dec 7, 2011	Prefectural Gymnasium, Osaka, Japan	Retained WBA (Regular) bantamweight title
27	Win	26–1	David De La Mora	UD	12	Aug 31, 2011	Nihon Budokan, Tokyo, Japan	Retained WBA (Regular) bantamweight title
26	Win	25–1	Daniel Diaz	RTD	11 (12), 3:00	May 7, 2011	Prefectural Gymnasium, Osaka, Japan	Retained WBA (Regular) bantamweight title
25	Win	24–1	Alexander Muñoz	UD	12	Dec 26, 2010	Super Arena, Saitama, Japan	Won vacant WBA (Regular) bantamweight title
24	Win	23–1	Cecilio Santos	KO	4 (10), 0:49	Jul 25, 2010	Prefectural Gymnasium, Osaka, Japan	
23	Loss	22–1	Pongsaklek Wonjongkam	MD	12	Mar 27, 2010	Ariake Colosseum, Tokyo, Japan	Lost WBC flyweight title; For vacant The Ring flyweight title
22	Win	22–0	Daisuke Naito	UD	12	Nov 29, 2009	Super Arena, Saitama, Japan	Won WBC flyweight title
21	Win	21–0	Humberto Pool	KO	5 (10), 2:29	Sep 5, 2009	Differ Ariake Arena, Tokyo, Japan	
20	Win	20–0	Dolores Osorio	KO	2 (10), 2:09	Mar 4, 2009	Super Arena, Saitama, Japan	
19	Win	19–0	Salvador Montes	UD	12	Aug 30, 2008	Monterrey Arena, Monterrey, Mexico	Won vacant WBA Inter-Continental flyweight title
18	Win	18–0	Marino Montiel	TKO	2 (10), 1:54	Jul 12, 2008	Palenque De La Expo, Hermosillo, Mexico	
17	Win	17–0	Rexon Flores	UD	10	Mar 22, 2008	Makuhari Messe, Chiba City, Japan	
16	Win	16–0	Cesar Lopez	UD	10	Jul 28, 2007	Ariake Colosseum, Tokyo, Japan	
15	Win	15–0	Irfan Ogah	TKO	8 (10), 2:23	May 23, 2007	Central Gym, Osaka, Japan	
14	Win	14–0	Everardo Morales	UD	10	Mar 24, 2007	Ryōgoku Kokugikan, Tokyo, Japan	
13	Win	13–0	Juan Jose Landaeta	UD	12	Dec 20, 2006	Ariake Colosseum, Tokyo, Japan	Retained WBA light-flyweight title
12	Win	12–0	Juan Jose Landaeta	SD	12	Aug 2, 2006	Yokohama Arena, Yokohama, Japan	Won vacant WBA light-flyweight title
11	Win	11–0	Carlos Fajardo	TKO	2 (10), 1:28	May 5, 2006	Ariake Colosseum, Tokyo, Japan	
10	Win	10–0	Carlos Bouchan	KO	6 (10), 2:20	Mar 8, 2006	Ryōgoku Kokugikan, Tokyo, Japan	
9	Win	9–0	Noel Arambulet	RTD	7 (10), 3:00	Nov 26, 2005	Super Arena, Saitama, Japan	
8	Win	8–0	Wanmeechok Singwancha	TKO	3 (12), 0:50	Aug 21, 2005	Bunka Gym, Yokohama, Japan	Won OPBF flyweight title
7	Win	7–0	Saman Sorjaturong	KO	1 (10), 2:59	Jun 20, 2005	Korakuen Hall, Tokyo, Japan	
6	Win	6–0	Yodkeng Singwangcha	KO	1 (10), 2:10	Feb 21, 2005	Korakuen Hall, Tokyo, Japan	
5	Win	5–0	Nopadetchlek Chuwatana	KO	2 (10), 0:59	Dec 13, 2004	Central Hall, Osaka, Japan	
4	Win	4–0	Daochai KT Gym	UD	10	Sep 27, 2004	Prefectural Gymnasium, Osaka, Japan	
3	Win	3–0	Saming Twingym	KO	1 (8), 1:48	May 22, 2004	Prefectural Gymnasium, Osaka, Japan	
2	Win	2–0	Prakan Twingym	KO	1 (6), 1:12	Mar 13, 2004	Central Gym, Osaka, Japan	
1	Win	1–0	Dennarong Sithsoba	KO	1 (6), 0:44	Dec 21, 2003	Central Gym, Osaka, Japan	

== Titles in boxing ==
=== Major world titles ===
- WBA light-flyweight champion (108 lbs)
- WBC flyweight champion (112 lbs)

=== Secondary major world titles (Note: The secondary champion lineage lists the Regular or Unified champions while the primary champion is occupied.) ===
- WBA (Regular) bantamweight champion (118 lbs)

=== Regional/International titles ===
- OPBF flyweight champion (112 lbs)
- WBA Inter-Continental flyweight champion (112 lbs)

== Criticism ==
Kameda is often criticized for his flamboyance, immaturity, and lack of respect both inside and outside the ring. He has never spoken courteously towards anyone in his numerous TV appearances, (considering that the Japanese language has tenses specifically used for courteous speech) and often taunts opponents with insulting presents and language. Criticism also revolves around his boxing skills and sportsmanship. The fact that Kameda's first six opponents had a combined record of 0–18 brought much criticism during the early part of his professional career. Many Japanese boxers, including former WBC Super flyweight champion Masamori Tokuyama and WBC Minimumweight title Eagle Kyowa, have stated that they could easily defeat Kameda if given a chance, and that his boasting and popularity are greatly out of proportion with his actual skills in the ring.

There was an outcry from the Japanese public about his first bout against Landaeta being fixed. Former world champions Guts Ishimatsu and Yasuei Yakushiji have commented that they believe Kameda lost the fight.

He was also involved in the controversy surrounding his brother Daiki during his fight with Daisuke Naito. Koki escaped with a warning about advising Daiki to elbow Naito in the eye. His brother was suspended from fighting for one year and his father was suspended indefinitely for the incident.

It was originally rumored and intended that Kameda would fight then WBC Light Flyweight title holder, Brian Viloria, in a WBA/WBC unification title fight. However, Kameda's controversial decision over Landaeta in the first match and Viloria losing to Omar Nino made the match difficult to produce further talks.

He is dubbed as Naniwa no Tōken (浪速の闘拳) in Japanese. Naniwa is a former designation of Osaka. The nickname denotes "The Fighting Fist of Osaka", though it is sometimes derided by his anti-fans as "浪速の逃犬" (pronounced the same as the original one), which means the run-away dog of Osaka.

== See also ==
- List of flyweight boxing champions
- List of WBA world champions
- List of WBC world champions
- Notable boxing families
- List of Japanese boxing world champions
- Boxing in Japan

== Notes ==
Sporting positions
Regional boxing titles
Preceded by Wanmeechok Singwancha	OPBF flyweight champion August 21, 2005 – October 2005; Vacated	Vacant Title next held by Noriyuki Komatsu
Vacant Title last held by Brahim Asloum	WBA Inter-Continental flyweight champion August 30, 2008 – July 2009; Vacated	Vacant Title next held by Oleksandr Hryshchuk
World boxing titles
Vacant Title last held by Roberto Vásquez	WBA light-flyweight champion August 2, 2006 – January 19, 2007; Vacated	Vacant Title next held by Juan Carlos Reveco
Preceded by Daisuke Naito	WBC flyweight champion November 29, 2009 – March 27, 2010	Succeeded by Pongsaklek Wonjongkam
Preceded by Daisuke Naito	Lineal flyweight champion November 29, 2009 – March 27, 2010	Succeeded by Pongsaklek Wonjongkam
New title	WBA bantamweight champion Regular title December 26, 2010 – May 8, 2012; Status changed	Vacant Title next held by Himself
Vacant Title last held by Himself	WBA bantamweight champion Regular title November 9, 2012 – December 6, 2013; Vacated	Vacant Title next held by Jamie McDonnell
Honorary boxing titles
New title	WBA bantamweight champion Regular title In recess May 8, 2012 – November 9, 2012; Reinstated	Vacant
