= Daisuke Naito =

Japanese boxer (born 1974)

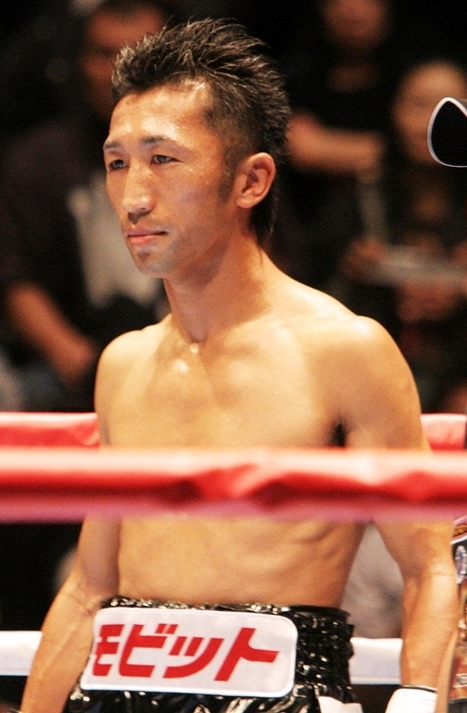
- Naito in November 2009

Personal information
- Nationality: Japanese
- Born: Daisuke Naito; 30 August 1974 (age 52) Toyoura, Hokkaido, Japan
- Height: 162 cm (5 ft 4 in)
- Weight: Flyweight

Boxing career
- Stance: Orthodox

Boxing record
- Total fights: 41
- Wins: 35
- Win by KO: 22
- Losses: 3
- Draws: 3

Daisuke Naito (内藤 大助, Naitō Daisuke; born 30 August 1974) is a former professional boxer from Japan. He is the former WBC and lineal flyweight champion, and former Japanese and OPBF flyweight champion.

== Professional career ==
Naito made his professional debut in October 1996. He compiled an undefeated record, and challenged future WBA flyweight champion Takefumi Sakata for the Japanese flyweight title on 16 July 2001, but failed to win the title in a 10-round draw.

Naito traveled to Thailand in 2002 for his first world title shot, challenging Pongsaklek Wonjongkam for the WBC and lineal flyweight titles. Naito was knocked out only 34 seconds into the first round, setting the record for the fastest knockout in a world flyweight title match ever.

On 6 June 2004, Naito dominated his opponent to win the Japanese flyweight title. He made his first defense later that year, knocking out the challenger only 24 seconds into the first round to set the record for the shortest Japanese flyweight title match ever. He made two defenses before returning his title.

Naito challenged Wonjongkam for the second time on 10 October 2005, but lost by decision after the fight was stopped due to an injury in the 7th round. Naito won the Japanese flyweight title for the second time in February 2006, and won the OPBF flyweight title in June 2006, by 6th-round TKO.

Naito made one defense of the OPBF title before returning it in February 2007. He also announced his decision to challenge Pongsaklek Wonjongkam for the third time, but found it difficult to gather sponsors. The match was finalized on 6 July; only 12 days prior to the actual match-up. Naito defeated Pongsaklek Wonjongkam on 18 July 2007 by 12-round unanimous decision, winning the WBC and lineal flyweight titles five years after his first world title shot. Wonjongkam had made 17 defenses of the world title, and had not lost in over a decade.

On 11 October 2007, Naito defeated Daiki Kameda by unanimous decision for the first defense of his WBC and lineal titles. Naito thoroughly outclassed the younger fighter (Kameda is 15 years his junior) despite being fouled throughout the fight. He received illegal blows to the thighs on several occasions, and was thrown down onto the ring in a wrestling-like maneuver in the 12th round. Koki Kameda's upcoming fight was cancelled after video footage was produced showing that he encouraged his younger brother to foul Naito in-between rounds, and Daiki Kameda's boxing license was suspended for one year. The fight received widespread coverage by the Japanese media because of the heated exchanges between Naito and the Kameda boxing family. Daiki Kameda had described Naito as a "cockroach" prior to the fight, and stated that he would commit harakiri (ritual suicide) if he were to lose. The victory gave Naito celebrity status in Japan, and he has appeared in numerous Japanese television programs and commercials since then.

Naito fought Pongsaklek Wonjongkam for the 4th time on 3 March 2008 for his 2nd title defense. Naito retained his titles as the bout ended in a draw, with one judge scoring the bout even, another scoring it in favor of Naito, and the other in favor of Wonjongkam. His 3rd defense came against Japanese flyweight champion Tomonobu Shimizu on 30 July 2008 at the Yoyogi National Gymnasium in Tokyo. The open scoring system was used for this bout, and the score announcement after the 8th round revealed Shimizu to be leading on points. However, Naito landed a left hook and a combination to score a knockdown in the 10th round, and won the fight by knockout in the same round with another combination. This bout was on the same card as WBA flyweight champion Takefumi Sakata's 4th title defense, and Koki Kameda made a surprise appearance on the ring to congratulate Naito during the post-fight interview.

On 23 December 2008, Naito won in his 4th title defense by stopping Shingo Yamaguchi in the 11th round.

For his 5th defense, Naito faced Xiong Chaozhong of China on 26 May 2009. Despite taking on a rather small opponent (152 cm, 5 ft 0 in), Naito was sent to the canvas in the 6th round. But in the end, he still escaped with a unanimous decision.

On 29 November 2009, he lost the WBC lineal flyweight titles to Koki Kameda in Saitama, Japan, losing by unanimous decision.

Naito retired from boxing in November 2011. Since his retirement, he works as a boxing commentator and a tarento.

== Professional boxing record ==
42 fights	36 wins	3 losses
By knockout	23	1
By decision	13	2
Draws	3	

No.	Result	Record	Opponent	Type	Round, time	Date	Location	Notes
42	Win	36–3–3	Phaiboon Chumthong	KO	5 (10), 2:12	May 9, 2010	Korakuen Hall, Japan	
41	Loss	35–3–3	Koki Kameda	UD	12	Nov 29, 2009	Super Arena, Saitama, Japan	Lost WBC flyweight title
40	Win	35–2–3	Xiong Chaozhong	UD	12	May 26, 2009	Differ Ariake, Japan	Retained WBC flyweight title
39	Win	34–2–3	Shingo Yamaguchi	TKO	11 (12), 1:11	Dec 23, 2008	Kokugikan, Japan	Retained WBC flyweight title
38	Win	33–2–3	Tomonobu Shimizu	KO	10 (12), 0:57	Jul 30, 2008	Yoyogi First Gym, Japan	Retained WBC flyweight title
37	Draw	32–2–3	Pongsaklek Wonjongkam	SD	12	Mar 8, 2008	Kokugikan, Japan	Retained WBC flyweight title
36	Win	32–2–2	Daiki Kameda	UD	12	Oct 11, 2007	Ariake Colosseum, Japan	Retained WBC flyweight title
35	Win	31–2–2	Pongsaklek Wonjongkam	UD	12	Jul 18, 2007	Korakuen Hall, Japan	Won WBC flyweight title
34	Win	30–2–2	Hiroshi Yoshiyama	UD	12	Dec 10, 2006	IMP Hall, Osaka, Japan	Retained OPBF flyweight title
33	Win	29–2–2	Noriyuki Komatsu	TKO	6 (12), 1:38	Jun 27, 2006	Korakuen Hall, Japan	Retained Japanese flyweight title; Won OPBF flyweight title
32	Win	28–2–2	Daigo Nakahiro	SD	10	Feb 13, 2006	Korakuen Hall, Japan	Retained Japanese flyweight title
31	Loss	27–2–2	Pongsaklek Wonjongkam	TD	7 (12), 2:38	Oct 10, 2005	Korakuen Hall, Japan	For WBC flyweight title
30	Win	27–1–2	Nobuyuki Enomoto	UD	10	Apr 11, 2005	Korakuen Hall, Japan	Retained Japanese flyweight title
29	Win	26–1–2	Takeyuki Kojima	KO	1 (10), 0:24	Oct 11, 2004	Korakuen Hall, Japan	Retained Japanese flyweight title
28	Win	25–1–2	Hiroshi Nakano	TD	6 (8), 2:33	Jun 6, 2004	Fukiage Hall, Nagoya, Japan	Won Japanese flyweight title
27	Win	24–1–2	Takahiro Uryu	TKO	2 (8)	Feb 25, 2004	Korakuen Hall, Japan	
26	Win	23–1–2	Somchai Nuena	KO	5 (10)	Sep 2, 2003	Korakuen Hall, Japan	
25	Win	22–1–2	Manop Sithgorson	TKO	2 (10)	Feb 26, 2003	Korakuen Hall, Japan	
24	Win	21–1–2	Teppei Kikui	UD	10	Dec 11, 2002	Korakuen Hall, Japan	
23	Win	20–1–2	Uthat Phaopheng	TKO	7 (10)	Sep 19, 2002	Korakuen Hall, Japan	
22	Loss	19–1–2	Pongsaklek Wonjongkam	KO	1 (12), 0:34	Apr 19, 2002	Provincial gymnasium, Khon Kaen, Thailand	For WBC flyweight title
21	Win	19–0–2	Win Panyaparichot	TKO	5 (10)	Oct 8, 2001	Korakuen Hall, Japan	
20	Draw	18–0–2	Takefumi Sakata	PTS	10	Jul 16, 2001	Korakuen Hall, Japan	For Japanese flyweight title
19	Win	18–0–1	Jun Carola	TKO	5 (10)	Feb 13, 2001	Korakuen Hall, Japan	
18	Win	17–0–1	Masamitsu Ikeda	UD	10	Dec 5, 2000	Korakuen Hall, Japan	
17	Win	16–0–1	Sakmongkol Singmanasak	TKO	3 (10)	Oct 28, 2000	Differ Ariake, Japan	
16	Win	15–0–1	Sangwan Chaipha	KO	3 (8)	Sep 19, 2000	Korakuen Hall, Japan	
15	Win	14–0–1	Hideyoshi Iha	UD	6	Jul 6, 2000	Korakuen Hall, Japan	
14	Win	13–0–1	Shoki Jun	UD	8	Dec 15, 1999	Korakuen Hall, Japan	
13	Win	12–0–1	Myong Sung Lee	KO	1 (8)	Sep 13, 1999	Korakuen Hall, Japan	
12	Win	11–0–1	Jovy Mancha	TKO	7 (8)	Jun 14, 1999	Korakuen Hall, Japan	
11	Win	10–0–1	Jun Orhaliza	TKO	2 (8)	Apr 5, 1999	Korakuen Hall, Japan	
10	Win	9–0–1	Noboru Fukuyama	KO	1 (6)	Dec 19, 1998	Korakuen Hall, Japan	
9	Win	8–0–1	Hiroaki Sato	UD	6	Nov 8, 1998	Korakuen Hall, Japan	
8	Win	7–0–1	Ryuji Kubota	MD	4	Sep 28, 1998	Korakuen Hall, Japan	
7	Win	6–0–1	Katsunori Ito	KO	1 (4)	Aug 7, 1998	Korakuen Hall, Japan	
6	Win	5–0–1	Takashi Sato	TKO	1 (4)	Jun 30, 1998	Korakuen Hall, Japan	
5	Win	4–0–1	Haruaki Anzai	KO	1 (4)	Apr 23, 1998	Korakuen Hall, Japan	
4	Draw	3–0–1	Nobuyuki Enomoto	PTS	4	Aug 1, 1997	Korakuen Hall, Japan	
3	Win	3–0	Yusuke Seki	KO	1 (4)	Jun 17, 1997	Korakuen Hall, Japan	
2	Win	2–0	Tsutomu Oshigane	KO	2 (4)	Apr 30, 1997	Korakuen Hall, Japan	
1	Win	1–0	Tatsuyuki Nishino	KO	1 (4)	Oct 11, 1996	Korakuen Hall, Japan	

== See also ==
- List of flyweight boxing champions
- List of WBC world champions
- List of Japanese boxing world champions
- Boxing in Japan

Achievements
Preceded by Pongsaklek Wonjongkam	Lineal Flyweight Champion; July 18, 2007 – November 29, 2009	Succeeded by Kōki Kameda
Preceded by Pongsaklek Wonjongkam	WBC Flyweight Champion; July 18, 2007 – November 29, 2009	Succeeded by Kōki Kameda
