= Mateo Handig =

Filipino boxer

Personal information
- Nickname: Waray Warrior
- Nationality: Filipino
- Born: Mateo Aquino Handig; September 14, 1989 (age 36) Catarman, Philippines
- Height: 5 ft 4 in (163 cm)
- Weight: Mini-flyweight; Light-flyweight; Flyweight; Bantamweight

Boxing career
- Stance: Orthodox

Boxing record
- Total fights: 42
- Wins: 17
- Win by KO: 11
- Losses: 25

Mateo Handig (born 14 September 1989) is a Filipino professional boxer who has been ranked as the world #1 mini-flyweight by the IBF.

== Professional career ==
Handing has competed for titles in four weight divisions. He earned the rank of world #1 mini-flyweight by the IBF in October 2012 by defeating Katsunari Takayama, capturing the Pan Pacific title in the process. The fight would have ended in a majority draw had Takayama not been deducted a point for repeated pushing. Other contenders Handing has fought includes Paipharob Kokietgym, Nawaphon Kaikanha, and Drian Francisco. Handing also won the WBC–ABCO title in 2011 with a win over Bimbo Nacionales.

== Professional boxing record ==
42 fights	17 wins	25 losses
By knockout	11	7
By decision	6	18

No.	Result	Record	Opponent	Type	Round, time	Date	Location	Notes
42	Loss	17–25	(Japan) Ayumu Sano	KO	1 (8), 2:17	16 Mar 2024	Port Messe Nagoya, Nagoya, Japan	
41	Win	17–24	(Philippines) Rodel Sunquit	KO	3 (6), 0:53	28 Oct 2023	The Flash Grand Ballroom of the Elorde Sports Complex, Parañaque, Philippines	
40	Win	16–24	(Philippines) Mark Antonio	TKO	9 (10), 2:09	26 Aug 2023	Roxas, Isabela, Philippines	
39	Loss	15–24	(Philippines) Alvin Camique	TKO	6 (10)	25 Jun 2023	Davao City, Davao del Sur, Philippines	
38	Loss	15–23	(Philippines) Gary Tamayo	UD	8	23 Sep 2022	AZF Sports Club, Malabon, Philippines	
37	Loss	15–22	(Philippines) Bryan James Wild	UD	8	7 Aug 2022	Bonifacio R. Bacaltos Sport and Cultural Center, Sibonga, Philippines	
36	Loss	15–21	(Philippines) Cris Paulino	UD	12	14 Dec 2019	The Flash Grand Ballroom of the Elorde Sports Complex, Parañaque, Philippines	For vacant PGAB Filipino super flyweight title
35	Loss	15–20	(Philippines) Ricardo Sueno	UD	10	12 Oct 2019	The Flash Grand Ballroom of the Elorde Sports Complex, Parañaque, Philippines	
34	Loss	15–19	(Thailand) Yodmongkol Vor Saengthep	UD	10	19 Jul 2019	JBAC College, Bangkok, Thailand	For vacant OPBF Silver super flyweight title
33	Loss	15–18	(Philippines) Wilbert Berondo	KO	9 (10), 0:40	27 Apr 2019	The Flash Grand Ballroom of the Elorde Sports Complex, Parañaque, Philippines	
32	Loss	15–17	(Thailand) Jakrawut Majungeon	UD	10	12 Oct 2018	Rangsit Stadium, Rangsit, Thailand	For OPBF Silver super flyweight title
31	Win	15–16	(Philippines) Orlandino Sinaloba	TKO	2 (6), 0:52	6 Apr 2018	Municipal Gymnasium, La Trinidad, Philippines	
30	Win	14–16	(Philippines) Albert Alcoy	KO	2 (10), 2:45	10 Feb 2018	Mandaluyong City Hall Grounds, Mandaluyong, Philippines	Won vacant LuzProBA super bantamweight title
29	Loss	13–16	(Philippines) Alphoe Dagayloan	TD	5 (10), 1:35	10 Dec 2017	Santa Barbara, Philippines	Fight stopped due to excessive rain
28	Loss	13–15	(Philippines) Michael Dasmariñas	KO	8 (8), 0:52	24 Aug 2017	Barangay Palanan, Makati, Philippines	
27	Loss	13–14	(Philippines) Giovanni Escaner	SD	6	28 May 2017	The Flash Grand Ballroom of the Elorde Sports Complex, Parañaque, Philippines	
26	Loss	13–13	(Philippines) Drian Francisco	UD	10	18 Feb 2017	Cinema Square Boxing Arena, Makati, Philippines	
25	Loss	13–12	(Philippines) Lester Abutan	UD	10	28 Sep 2016	Town Plaza, Biñan, Philippines	
24	Loss	13–11	(Philippines) Rene Dacquel	UD	10	20 Feb 2016	Sports Complex, Taguig, Philippines	
23	Loss	13–10	(Philippines) Ben Mananquil	KO	3 (10), 1:14	6 Sep 2015	Municipal Gymnasium, La Trinidad, Philippines	
22	Loss	13–9	(Thailand) Boonsom Lamsiri	KO	8 (12)	5 Mar 2015	City Hall Ground, Chonburi, Thailand	For PABA bantamweight title
21	Loss	13–8	(Thailand) Nawaphon Kaikanha	KO	5 (12)	21 Nov 2014	Municipality of Nongsaeng, Sara Buri, Thailand	For WBC–ABCO flyweight title
20	Loss	13–7	(Thailand) Paipharob Kokietgym	UD	12	4 Oct 2014	Ban Rai Temple, Nakhon Ratchasima, Thailand	For PABA light-flyweight title
19	Loss	13–6	(Mexico) Ganigan Lopez	UD	12	24 Aug 2013	Lienzo Charro “Los Tamaulipecos”, Reynosa, Mexico	For WBC–USNBC mini-flyweight title
18	Win	13–5	(Japan) Katsunari Takayama	SD	12	13 Oct 2012	Municipal Gymnasium, La Trinidad, Philippines	Won vacant IBF Pan Pacific mini-flyweight title
17	Win	12–5	(Philippines) Dodoy Alapormina	UD	6	21 Apr 2012	Town Plaza, Santa Cruz, Philippines	
16	Win	11–5	(Philippines) Jonel Borbon	KO	2 (4), 1:41	23 Dec 2011	Sports Complex, Angono, Philippines	
15	Win	10–5	(Philippines) Mabert Paulino	UD	4	26 Nov 2011	Barangay Tejeres Convention Center, Rosario, Philippines	
14	Win	9–5	(Philippines) Bimbo Nacionales	TKO	7 (12), 2:55	16 Oct 2011	Municipal Gymnasium, La Trinidad, Philippines	Won vacant WBC–ABCO mini-flyweight title
13	Loss	8–5	(Philippines) Donny Mabao	UD	12	16 Sep 2011	Bislig, Philippines	For vacant WBC Asian Continental mini-flyweight title
12	Win	8–4	(Philippines) Leonardo Talisic	KO	4 (6), 2:46	7 May 2011	Tayabas, Philippines	
11	Win	7–4	(Philippines) Mark Ian Rojas	TKO	5 (6), 0:30	25 Mar 2011	Oxford Hotel & Casino, Angeles City, Philippines	
10	Win	6–4	(Philippines) Ricky Oyan	MD	6	18 Feb 2011	Caloocan, Philippines	
9	Win	5–4	(Philippines) Roy Albaera	KO	6 (8), 1:51	25 Sep 2010	Hotel EuroAsia, Angeles City, Philippines	
8	Win	4–4	(Philippines) Redney Quezon	UD	6	17 Jul 2010	Hotel EuroAsia, Angeles City, Philippines	
7	Win	3–4	(Philippines) Leo de Guia	UD	6	12 Jun 2010	Malolos Sports Complex, Malolos, Philippines	
6	Loss	2–4	(Philippines) Lionel Mark Duran	SD	6	18 Mar 2010	San Simon, Philippines	
5	Win	2–3	(Philippines) Ricky Dagatan	TKO	2 (4), 2:43	19 Feb 2010	Balibago Sports Complex, Santa Rosa, Philippines	
4	Loss	1–3	(Philippines) Rey Perez	UD	4	4 Sep 2009	Santa Rosa Sports Complex, Santa Rosa, Philippines	
3	Win	1–2	(Philippines) Alf John Aguda	TKO	3 (4), 1:39	12 May 2009	Tayabas, Philippines	
2	Loss	0–2	(Philippines) Renjie Abendan	UD	4	19 Apr 2009	Araneta Coliseum, Quezon City, Philippines	
1	Loss	0–1	(Philippines) Michael Escobia	UD	4	5 Apr 2009	Ynares Sports Arena, Pasig, Philippines	

Sporting positions
Regional boxing titles
Vacant Title last held by Roilo Golez	WBC–ABCO mini-flyweight champion 16 Oct 2011 – Feb 2012; Vacated	Vacant Title next held by Vicha Phulaikaw
Vacant Title last held by Muhammad Rachman	IBF Pan Pacific mini-flyweight champion 13 Oct 2012 – Apr 2013; Vacated	Vacant Title next held by Florante Condes
