= Hugo Cázares =

Mexican boxer

Personal information
- Nickname: El Increíble
- Born: Hugo Fidel Cázares; 24 March 1978 (age 48) Los Mochis, Sinaloa, Mexico
- Weight: Light flyweight; Super flyweight

Boxing career
- Stance: Southpaw

Boxing record
- Total fights: 51
- Wins: 40
- Win by KO: 27
- Losses: 9
- Draws: 2

Hugo Fidel Cázares (born 24 March 1978) is a Mexican former professional boxer who competed from 1997 to 2016. He is a world champion in two weight classes, having held the World Boxing Organization (WBO) light flyweight title from 2005 to 2007, and the World Boxing Association (WBA) super flyweight title from 2010 to 2011.

== Professional career ==
=== Junior Flyweight division ===
On April 30, 2005, Cazares won the WBO and vacant Lineal junior flyweight titles by defeating reigning WBO champion Nelson Dieppa. Cazares defended the title twice in 2005, against former champion Alex Sánchez and Kaichon Sor Vorapin. In 2006, he defended the title two additional times against Domingo Guillen and a rematch with Dieppa. In 2006, he successfully defended his title for a fifth time against Wilfrido Valdez.

In his next bout, Cazares lost the WBO junior flyweight title by split decision to Iván Calderón in Calderon's home territory of Puerto Rico. Cazares dropped Calderon in the 8th round. Cazares then defeated former champion Kermin Guardia before facing Calderon in a rematch. Cazares lost the rematch by technical decision in the 7th round after Calderon sustained a cut from an accidental clash of heads.

=== Super Flyweight division ===
Cazares then moved up two divisions and scored three straight victories, including a win over former champion Roberto Vasquez. On September 30, 2009, Cazares faced WBA Super Flyweight champion Nobuo Nashiro. The bout ended in a 12-round draw. The two faced off in a rematch, this time Cazares defeated Nashiro by unanimous decision as he captured the WBA Super Flyweight title. Cázares successfully defended his title three times in 2010 with victories over Everardo Morales, Alberto Rossel, and Hiroyuki Hisataka.

==== Carl Frampton vs Hugo Cazares ====
After Hugo's defeat to Tomonobu Shimizu, he won five fights in a row over Adnan Garcia, Daniel Diaz, Rey Perez, Gabriel Altarejos and Julio César Miranda.

On 4 April 2014, Cazares came to undefeated Carl Frampton's home city of Belfast in Northern Ireland and faced him in a final eliminator for Leo Santa Cruz's WBC Super-Bantamweight World title, in the Odyssey Arena in front of an estimated crowd of 9,000 fans.

Hugo entered to Maroon 5's song, "One More Night" and received a largely hostile reception from the pro-Frampton Belfast crowd. Unfortunately for Hugo Cazares, his night ended early as he lost to Carl Frampton by KO in the 2nd Round.

== Professional boxing record ==
51 fights	40 wins	9 losses
By knockout	27	4
By decision	13	5
Draws	2	

No.	Result	Record	Opponent	Type	Round, time	Date	Location	Notes
51	Loss	40–9–2	Andrew Cancio	KO	3 (12), 2:49	25 Mar 2016	Fantasy Springs Casino, Indio, California, U.S.	
50	Loss	40–8–2	Carl Frampton	KO	2 (12), 1:38	4 Apr 2014	Odyssey Arena, Belfast, Northern Ireland	
49	Win	40–7–2	Julio Cesar Miranda	UD	12	7 Dec 2013	Hotel Ixtapa Azul, Zihuatanejo, Guerrero, Mexico	Retained WBC International Silver super bantamweight title
48	Win	39–7–2	Gabrial Altarejos	KO	1 (12), 2:52	26 Jan 2013	Centro Civico de Ecatepec, Ecatepec, Mexico	Retained WBC International Silver super bantamweight title
47	Win	38–7–2	Rey Perez	UD	12	26 Jan 2013	Gimnasio Manuel Bernardo Aguirre, Chihuahua, Mexico	Won vacant WBC International Silver super bantamweight title
46	Win	37–7–2	Daniel Diaz	UD	12	11 Aug 2012	Polideportivo Centenario, Los Mochis, Sinaloa, Mexico	
45	Win	36–7–2	Adan Garcia	TKO	7 (12), 0:41	19 Nov 2011	Hotel Fairmont Princess, Acapulco, Guerrero, Mexico	
44	Loss	35–7–2	Tomonobu Shimizu	SD	12	31 Aug 2011	Nihon Budokan, Tokyo, Japan	Lost WBA super flyweight title
43	Win	35–6–2	Arturo Badillo	KO	3 (12), 2:00	9 Jul 2011	Lobo Dome, Mazatlan, Sinaloa, Mexico	Retained WBA super flyweight ritle
42	Win	34–6–2	Hiroyuki Hisataka	UD	12	23 Dec 2010	Prefectural Gymnasium, Osaka, Japan	Retained WBA super flyweight title
41	Win	33–6–2	Alberto Rossel	TKO	9 (12), 0:31	9 Oct 2010	Centro de Convenciones, Tlalnepantla, Mexico	Retained WBA (Regular) super flyweight title
40	Win	32–6–2	Everardo Morales	TKO	7 (12), 1:00	3 Jul 2010	Centro de Convenciones, Tlalnepantla, Mexico	Retained WBA (Regular) super flyweight title
39	Win	31–6–2	Nobuo Nashiro	UD	12	8 May 2010	Prefectural Gymnasium, Osaka, Japan	Won WBA (Regular) super flyweight title
38	Draw	30–6–2	Nobuo Nashiro	SD	12	30 Sep 2009	Prefectural Gymnasium, Osaka, Japan	For WBA (Regular) super flyweight title
37	Win	30–6–1	Margarito Lopez	KO	1 (10), 1:06	13 Jun 2009	Centro Banamex, Mexico City, Distrito Federal, Mexico	
36	Win	29–6–1	Roberto Vasquez	UD	11	24 Mar 2009	Atlapa Convention Centre, Panama City, Panama	Won WBA Fedelatin super flyweight title
35	Win	28–6–1	Jorge Romero	TKO	3 (10)	28 Feb 2009	Auditorio Guelaguetza, Oaxaca, Mexico	
34	Loss	27–6–1	Iván Calderón	TD	7 (12), 1:58	30 Aug 2008	Coliseo Ruben Rodriguez, Bayamon, Puerto Rico	For WBO and The Ring light flyweight titles; Unanimous TD after Calderón cut from accidental head clash
33	Win	27–5–1	Kermin Guardia	UD	10	25 Jan 2008	Cicero Stadium, Cicero, Illinois, U.S.	
32	Loss	26–5–1	Iván Calderón	SD	12	25 Aug 2007	Coliseo Ruben Rodriguez, Bayamon, Puerto Rico	Lost WBO and The Ring light flyweight titles
31	Win	26–4–1	Wilfrido Valdez	TKO	2 (12), 0:25	4 May 2007	MGM Grand, Las Vegas, Nevada, U.S.	Retained WBO and The Ring light flyweight titles
30	Win	25–4–1	Nelson Dieppa	TKO	10 (12), 2:17	30 Sep 2006	Coliseo Héctor Solá Bezares, Caguas, Puerto Rico	Retained WBO light flyweight title; Won vacant The Ring light flyweight title
29	Win	24–4–1	Domingo Guillen	KO	1 (12), 1:53	30 Jun 2006	Desert Diamond Casino, Tucson, Arizona, U.S.	Retained WBO light flyweight title
28	Win	23–4–1	Kaichon Sor Vorapin	KO	6 (12), 2:14	29 Oct 2005	Desert Diamond Casino, Tucson, Arizona, U.S.	Retained WBO light flyweight title
27	Win	22–4–1	Alex Sánchez	RTD	8 (12), 0:10	20 Aug 2005	Auditorio Juan Pachín Vicéns, Ponce, Puerto Rico	Retained WBO light flyweight title
26	Win	21–4–1	Nelson Dieppa	TD	10 (12), 2:15	30 Apr 2005	Coliseo Jose Miguel Agrelot, Hato Rey, Puerto Rico	Won WBO light flyweight title
25	Win	20–4–1	Miguel Del Valle	UD	10	29 Jan 2005	Coliseo Ruben Rodriguez, Bayamon, Puerto Rico	
24	Win	19–4–1	Juan Alfonso Keb Baas	TKO	9 (10), 2:49	3 Apr 2004	Grand Arena, City of Industry, California, U.S.	Won California State light flyweight title
23	Win	18–4–1	Alejandro Moreno	UD	10	7 Nov 2003	Don Haskins Convention Center, El Paso, Texas, U.S.	
22	Win	17–4–1	Valentin Leon	TKO	4 (10)	2 Jun 2003	Coeur d'Alene Casino, Worley, Idaho, U.S.	
21	Win	16–4–1	Eric Jamili	TKO	3 (12)	18 Jan 2003	Estadio Emilo Ibarra Almada, Los Mochis, Sinaloa, Mexico	Retained WBO NABO light flyweight title
20	Win	15–4–1	Francisco Garcia	TKO	4 (12)	19 Jul 2002	Los Mochis, Sinaloa, Mexico	Retained WBO NABO light flyweight title
19	Win	14–4–1	Rafael Orozco	KO	6 (12)	22 Mar 2002	Centro de Espectaculos Modelo, Ciudad Obregon, Sonora, Mexico	Won WBO NABO light flyweight title
18	Win	13–4–1	Francisco Garcia	TKO	7 (12)	19 Oct 2000	Arena Mexico, Mexico City, Distrito Federal, Mexico	Won Mexico light flyweight title
17	Win	12–4–1	Fernando Luna Velez	TKO	10 (10), 2:25	3 Jun 2000	Mexico City, Distrito Federal, Mexico	
16	Win	11–4–1	Indalecio Valenzuela	TKO	2	7 Mar 2000	Tijuana, Baja California, Mexico	
15	Loss	10–4–1	Victor Hernandez	PTS	10	18 Dec 1999	Culiacan, Sinaloa, Mexico	
14	Loss	10–3–1	Gerson Guerrero	TKO	5 (12)	30 Oct 1999	Arena Mexico, Mexico City, Distrito Federal, Mexico	For WBC FECARBOX super flyweight title
13	Win	10–2–1	Leonardo Rodriguez	TKO	3 (12)	10 Sep 1999	Salon Forum, Los Mochis, Sinaloa, Mexico	Won Mexican Pacific Coast super flyweight title
12	Win	9–2–1	Manuel Sarabia	PTS	10	28 May 1999	Parque Revolucion, Culiacan, Sinaloa, Mexico	
11	Loss	8–2–1	Sergio Perez	TKO	1 (12)	2 Apr 1999	Grand Hotel, Tijuana, Baja California, Mexico	For WBO NABO super flyweight title
10	Win	8–1–1	Fausto Munoz	KO	8 (10)	16 Oct 1998	Auditorio Benito Juarez, Los Mochis, Sinaloa, Mexico	
9	Win	7–1–1	Antonio Ruiz	TKO	6	28 Aug 1998	Auditorio Benito Juarez, Los Mochis, Sinaloa, Mexico	
8	Win	6–1–1	Jose Luis Velarde	UD	10	10 Jul 1998	Parque Revolucion, Culiacan, Sinaloa, Mexico	
7	Win	5–1–1	Juan Jose Beltran	KO	2 (10)	27 Mar 1998	Los Mochis, Sinaloa, Mexico	
6	Win	4–1–1	Manuel Yucupisio	KO	1	19 Dec 1997	Los Mochis, Sinaloa, Mexico	
5	Win	3–1–1	Martin Fing	TKO	1	1 Nov 1997	Los Mochis, Sinaloa, Mexico	
4	Win	2–1–1	Jorge Verdugo	TKO	2	26 Sep 1997	Mexico	
3	Win	1–1–1	Sergio Leyva	PTS	4	22 Aug 1997	Los Mochis, Sinaloa, Mexico	
2	Loss	0–1–1	Juan Jose Beltran	UD	4	23 May 1997	Auditorio Benito, Los Mochis, Sinaloa, Mexico	
1	Draw	0–0–1	Juan Jose Beltran	PTS	4	23 Feb 1997	Los Mochis, Sinaloa, Mexico	

== Titles in boxing ==
=== Major world titles ===
- WBO light flyweight champion (108 lbs)
- WBA super flyweight champion (115 lbs)

=== Secondary major world titles (Note: The secondary champion lineage lists the Regular or Unified champions while the primary champion is occupied.) ===
- WBA (Regular) super flyweight champion (115 lb)

=== The Ring magazine titles ===
- The Ring light flyweight champion (108 lbs)

=== Regional/International titles ===
- Mexican light flyweight champion (108 lbs)
- WBO-NABO light flyweight champion (108 lbs)
- California State light flyweight champion (108 lbs)
- Mexican Pacific Coast super flyweight champion (115 lbs)
- WBA Fedelatin super flyweight champion (115 lbs)
- WBC International Silver super bantamweight title (122 lbs)

== See also ==
- List of light flyweight boxing champions
- List of WBC world champions
- List of IBF world champions
- List of Mexican boxing world champions

== Notes and references ==
=== References ===
Sporting positions
World boxing titles
Preceded by Nelson Dieppa	WBO light flyweight champion 30 April 2005 – 25 August 2007	Succeeded by Iván Calderón
Preceded by Nobuo Nashiro	WBA super flyweight champion 8 May 2010 – 31 August 2011; Regular Title until 15 October 2010	Succeeded by Tomonobu Shimizu
