= Hiroyuki Hisataka =

Japanese boxer

Personal information
- Nationality: Japanese
- Born: Hiroyuki Hisataka; April 2, 1985 (age 41) Osaka, Osaka, Japan
- Height: 5 ft 4.5 in (1.64 m)
- Weight: Flyweight; Super Flyweight; Bantamweight

Boxing career
- Reach: 64 in (163 cm)
- Stance: Orthodox

Boxing record
- Total fights: 41
- Wins: 24
- Win by KO: 10
- Losses: 16
- Draws: 1

Hiroyuki Hisataka (久高 寛之, Hisataka Hiroyuki; born April 2, 1985 in Osaka) is a Japanese professional boxer.

== Professional career ==
Hisataka has challenged for a world title four times; twice at Flyweight and twice at Super Flyweight, but he was unsuccessful in all four attempts. At Flyweight, he lost to Takefumi Sakata on July 30, 2008 and Denkaosan Kaovichit on May 26, 2009; with the WBA Flyweight title on the line in both bouts. At Super Flyweight, he lost to Hugo Fidel Cazares on December 23, 2010 with the WBA Super Flyweight title on the line and Omar Andrés Narváez on August 24, 2013 with the WBO Super Flyweight title on the line.

== Professional boxing record ==
24 Wins (10 Knockouts, 14 Decisions), 16 Defeats (2 Knockouts, 14 Decisions), 1 Draw
Res.	Record	Opponent	Type	Rd., Time	Date	Location	Notes
Win	24-13-1	(Japan) Keisuke Tabuchi	UD	8	2015-08-16	(Japan) Abeno Ward Center, Osaka	
Win	23-13-1	(Japan) Keisuke Nakayama	UD	8	2015-04-03	(Japan) Osaka Prefectural Gymnasium, Osaka	
Loss	22-13-1	(Japan) Takuya Kogawa	UD	8	2014-10-10	(Japan) Korakuen Hall, Tokyo	
Loss	22-12-1	(Japan) Ryo Matsumoto	UD	8	2014-04-06	(Japan) Ota-City General Gymnasium, Tokyo	
Loss	22-11-1	(Argentina) Omar Andrés Narváez	TKO	10 (12), 1:26	2013-08-24	(Argentina) Gimnasio Municipal N° 1, Trelew, Chubut	For WBO Super Flyweight title.
Win	22-10-1	(Philippines) Sonny Boy Jaro	UD	10	2013-04-07	(Japan) Bodymaker Colosseum, Osaka	
Loss	21-10-1	(Thailand) Oleydong Sithsamerchai	UD	12	2012-11-12	(Thailand) Central Pavilion, Sara Buri	For WBC International Super Flyweight title.
Win	21-9-1	(Japan) Tetsuya Hisada	TKO	4 (10), 1:49	2012-07-21	(Japan) Osaka Prefectural Gymnasium, Osaka	
Win	20-9-1	(Thailand) Suknavin Or Benjamad	KO	2 (10), 1:09	2012-04-13	(Japan) Osaka Prefectural Gymnasium, Osaka	
Loss	19-9-1	(Mexico) Hugo Fidel Cazares	UD	12	2010-12-23	(Japan) Osaka Prefectural Gymnasium, Osaka	For WBA Super Flyweight title.
Win	19-8-1	(Thailand) Panomroonglek Kaiyanghadaogym	TKO	8 (12), 1:26	2010-05-04	(Thailand) Surat Thani	Won vacant WBC International Silver Flyweight title.
Win	18-8-1	(Thailand) Ratanadet PorThitima	TKO	7 (10), 1:14	2009-08-23	(Japan) Creo, Osaka	
Loss	17-8-1	(Thailand) Denkaosan Kaovichit	UD	8	2009-03-12	(Thailand) Central Stadium, Uttaradit	For WBA Flyweight title.
Win	17-7-1	(Japan) Yuki Takahashi	KO	2 (8), 3:07	2008-12-13	(Japan) Abeno Ward Center, Osaka	
Loss	16-7-1	(Japan) Takefumi Sakata	UD	12	2008-07-30	(Japan) Yoyogi First Gym, Tokyo	For WBA Flyweight title.
Win	16-6-1	(Australia) Hussein Hussein	UD	10	2007-12-25	(Japan) Azalea Taisho, Osaka	
Loss	15-6-1	(Philippines) Wyndel Janiola	SD	10	2007-08-25	(Japan) SM Mall of Asia, Pasig, Metro Manila	
Loss	15-5-1	(Thailand) Panomroonglek Kaiyanghadaogym	UD	10	2007-05-25	(Thailand) Por Kungpao, Udomsuk, Bangkok	For WBC Youth World Flyweight title.
Loss	15-4-1	(Japan) Kenji Yoshida	UD	10	2007-04-01	(Japan) Central Hall, Osaka	For interim Japanese Flyweight title.
Win	15-3-1	(Thailand) Saming Twingym	TKO	7 (10), 0:51	2006-12-14	(Japan) Azalea Taisho, Osaka	
Win	14-3-1	(Philippines) Federico Catubay	UD	10	2006-10-08	(Japan) IMP Hall, Osaka	
Win	13-3-1	(Japan) Takafumi Himeno	UD	12	2006-07-06	(Japan) Korakuen Hall, Tokyo	
Win	12-3-1	(Thailand) Yuchi Carryboy	KO	3 (10), 3:09	2006-03-22	(Japan) Central Hall, Osaka	
Win	11-3-1	(Philippines) Bert Batawang	TKO	2 (10), 0:44	2005-12-03	(Japan) Central Hall, Osaka	
Loss	10-3-1	(Japan) Tomonobu Shimizu	UD	8	2005-10-19	(Japan) Korakuen Hall, Tokyo	
Win	10-2-1	(Japan) Takahiro Takemura	SD	8	2005-04-04	(Japan) Central Gym, Osaka	
Win	9-2-1	(Japan) Tsunejiro Sato	UD	6	2004-12-19	(Japan) Korakuen Hall, Tokyo	
Win	8-2-1	(Japan) Chiharu Manda	UD	6	2004-11-21	(Japan) Zeep Fukuoka, Fukuoka	
Win	7-2-1	(Japan) Takeshi Honda	UD	6	2004-09-04	(Japan) Osaka Prefectural Gymnasium, Osaka	
Win	6-2-1	(Japan) Masato Kirino	UD	4	2004-06-13	(Japan) Azalea Taisho, Osaka	
Win	5-2-1	(Japan) Masayuki Kawaguchi	KO	3 (4), 1:17	2004-05-05	(Japan) Azalea Taisho, Osaka	
Win	4-2-1	(Japan) Takashi Morishima	UD	4	2003-12-14	(Japan) Azalea Taisho, Osaka	
Win	3-2-1	(Japan) Nobumasa Tanaka	UD	4	2003-10-12	(Japan) Azalea Taisho, Osaka	
Draw	2-2-1	(Japan) Masato Kirino	UD	4	2003-08-10	(Japan) Azalea Taisho, Osaka	
Win	2-2	(Japan) Kimihito Hori	UD	4	2003-05-24	(Japan) Prefectural Gymnasium, Wakayama	
Win	1-2	(Japan) Masayoshi Nishi	KO	2 (4), 2:07	2003-03-09	(Japan) Azalea Taisho, Osaka	
Loss	0-2	(Japan) Keita Omi	MD	4	2002-12-23	(Japan) Mizuno Christa, Osaka	
Loss	0-1	(Japan) Hirofumi Shiraishi	KO	1 (4), 2:19	2002-09-15	(Japan) Sanda, Hyogo	Professional Debut.
