= Medgoen Singsurat =

Thai boxer

Personal information
- Born: Boonsai Sangsurat; 12 June 1978 (age 48) Roi Et, Thailand
- Height: 5 ft 4 in (163 cm)
- Weight: Flyweight; Super flyweight; Bantamweight

Boxing career
- Stance: Orthodox

Boxing record
- Total fights: 80
- Wins: 74
- Win by KO: 51
- Losses: 6

Boonsai Sangsurat (Thai: เม็ดเงิน 3เคแบตเตอรี่; born 12 June 1978), better known as Medgoen Singsurat, is a Thai former professional boxer.

Sangsurat has assumed various ring names, including Big Daddy Med (Thai: เม็ดเงิน กระทิงแดงยิม) and Medgoen Lukjaopormahesak (Thai: เม็ดเงิน ลูกเจ้าพ่อมเหศักดิ์), albeit his real name or birth name has been confirmed as "Boonsai Sangsurat" (Thai: บุญใส สังสุราช). The non-Thai media also refer to him as Medgoen Singsurat, 3K Battery for Filipinos, or simply Medgoen Singh.

== Boxing career ==
Medgoen turned pro in 1997 and in 1999, captured the Lineal Flyweight Championship with a win over Filipino boxer Manny Pacquiao. Because of his win over Manny Pacquiao, Medgoen's name is often mentioned as one of eight opponents to have beaten Pacquiao (the other seven being Rustico Torrecampo, Erik Morales, Timothy Bradley, Juan Manuel Márquez, Floyd Mayweather Jr., Yordenis Ugas and Jeff Horn), and one of only three opponents to have knocked Pacquiao out. He is the second boxer to defeat Pacquiao in the latter's overall pro boxing career. He also won the vacant WBC Flyweight title that had been stripped from Pacquiao due to Pacquiao coming overweight at the weight-ins. He defended the titles once more before losing the titles in 2000 to Malcolm Tuñacao by TKO.

Medgoen is promoted by Thai Storage Battery Public Company Limited, and hence bears the 3K Battery name, as the company contracts Thai boxers to sponsor their products.

The story behind the victory over Manny Pacquiao in 1999 was revealed years later by his manager, Virat Vachirarattanawong. Even Virat himself admitted that he hadn't been confident his fighter could win, as Medgoen was merely an unknown underdog at the time. Many others in the boxing world felt the same way. However, relying on his experience, Virat noticed signs that Pacquiao might be struggling to make weight. When Pacquiao arrived in Thailand, Virat arranged for him to stay at Florida Hotel in the Ratchathewi neighbourhood. He quietly instructed hotel staff to observe Pacquiao's eating habits, and it turned out Pacquiao was ordering only light meals, such as vegetable salads. That, to Virat, was clear evidence that Pacquiao was cutting weight aggressively.

At the official weigh-in, Pacquiao failed to make the weight limit, causing him to be stripped of the world title. That meant if Medgoen won, he would be crowned the new world champion.

In the fight itself, the underdog delivered a stunning performance, landing heavy body shots in round three and winning by TKO. Virat later remarked that if Pacquiao had entered the ring in top physical condition, he believed Medgoen would have been knocked out within three rounds.

== Personal life ==
Medgoen Singsurat has a family full of boxers. His second cousin, Saranyoo Tohchoodee, born in Thailand on April 18, 1991, was also a professional boxer before giving up boxing to go to America to study along with his sister.

In addition to his boxing career, he played association football and was considered a candidate for the Thailand national team. However, a broken ankle sustained during a match ended his football ambitions, as he was unable to fully recover. He subsequently took up table tennis and was ranked as Thailand's top youth player for two consecutive years.

== Professional boxing record ==
80 fights	74 wins	6 losses
By knockout	51	6
By decision	23	0

No.	Result	Record	Opponent	Type	Round, time	Date	Location	Notes
80	Win	74–6	Wanchana Pattanakarngym	TKO	3 (6)	Jun 24, 2011	Chokchai 4 Market, Bangkok, Thailand	
79	Win	73–6	Pichit Twins Gym	TKO	2 (6)	Apr 29, 2011	E-sarn University, Khon Kaen, Thailand	
78	Win	72–6	Pichit Twins Gym	PTS	4	Feb 25, 2011	Ratchaburi, Thailand	
77	Win	71–6	Noppadol Chornkratok	TKO	2 (6)	Feb 1, 2011	Ban Kwao, Chaiyaphum, Thailand	
76	Win	70–6	Anucha Banti	TKO	3 (6)	Oct 29, 2010	Thungsimuang, Udon Thani, Thailand	
75	Win	69–6	Panturak Namtong	PTS	6	Sep 24, 2010	Siam Society Hotel and Resort, Bangkok, Thailand	
74	Win	68–6	Taiwo Ali	TKO	5 (6)	Aug 6, 2010	Sanam Chan Royal Palace, Nakhon Pathom, Thailand	
73	Win	67–6	Alejandro Muñoz	PTS	6	Jul 2, 2010	Sanam Chan Royal Palace, Nakhon Pathom, Thailand	
72	Win	66–6	Atsushi Uechi	TKO	4 (6)	May 27, 2010	Chokchai 4 Market, Bangkok, Thailand	
71	Win	65–6	Tarik Charafi	PTS	6	Mar 18, 2010	Prov. Electricity Boxing Arena, Samut Songkhram, Thailand	
70	Win	64–6	Sissy Keriyngkir	KO	2 (6)	Jan 15, 2010	Phaisali, Thailand	
69	Loss	63–6	Mikio Yasuda	TKO	2 (8)	Sep 30, 2009	Prefectural Gymnasium, Osaka, Japan	
68	Win	63–5	Pompetch Kiatmungmee	PTS	6	Jul 31, 2009	Sara Buri, Thailand	
67	Win	62–5	Yong Sathong	PTS	6	May 29, 2009	Bangla Boxing Stadium, Patong, Thailand	
66	Win	61–5	Anusorn Chaisura	TKO	4 (4)	Mar 27, 2009	City Hall Ground, Nakhon Ratchasima, Thailand	
65	Win	60–5	Anucha Rassameeyan	KO	6 (6)	Jan 30, 2009	Bangkok University, Thonburi Campus, Bangkok, Thailand	
64	Win	59–5	Dennarong Bigshotcamp	KO	3 (6)	Dec 3, 2008	Tha Tako, Thailand	
63	Win	58–5	Akbar Mohammadpour	PTS	6	Aug 29, 2008	Railway Station Boxing Arena, Sara Buri, Thailand	
62	Win	57–5	Kaichon Patonggym	TKO	3 (6)	Jun 18, 2008	Saphan Hin, Phuket, Thailand	
61	Win	56–5	Roger Monserto	KO	3 (10)	Apr 25, 2008	Bangkok, Thailand	
60	Win	55–5	Yodkumarn Chitraladagym	PTS	6	Feb 29, 2008	Chok Chai 4, Lad Prao, Bangkok, Thailand	
59	Win	54–5	Denpayak Sor Pisanu	PTS	6	Jan 25, 2008	Sara Buri, Thailand	
58	Loss	53–5	Jorge Arce	TKO	1 (12)	Dec 1, 2007	Tingley Coliseum, Albuquerque, New Mexico, U.S.	For WBC Latino bantamweight title
57	Win	53–4	Dennarong Bigshotcamp	KO	4 (6)	Oct 24, 2007	Bang Phli, Thailand	
56	Win	52–4	Noppachai Sithkosol	KO	3 (6)	Sep 21, 2007	Pattaya, Thailand	
55	Win	51–4	Fahsai Sithkaruehad	KO	3 (6)	Jul 31, 2007	Jomthong, Thailand	
54	Win	50–4	Payakdam Sithsaithong	KO	3 (10)	Jun 29, 2007	Bangkok, Thailand	
53	Win	49–4	Refly Rengkung	UD	8	Apr 27, 2007	Krabi, Thailand	
52	Win	48–4	Raheem Kadayree	TKO	7 (8)	Mar 30, 2007	Mathayom Wat Sing Schoo, Samut Prakan, Thailand	
51	Win	47–4	Tarek Krab	KO	4 (6)	Feb 23, 2007	Chokchai 4 Center, Bangkok, Thailand	
50	Win	46–4	Roger Monserto	TKO	5 (6)	Dec 29, 2006	Sara Buri, Thailand	
49	Win	45–4	Ric Moreno	KO	4 (8)	Oct 5, 2006	Wat Ban Plee Yai Klang, Thailand	
48	Win	44–4	Jonathan Gonzales	KO	3 (10)	Sep 7, 2006	Samut Songkhram, Thailand	
47	Win	43–4	Roger Monserto	TKO	5 (6)	Mar 31, 2006	Chokchai 4 Center, Bangkok, Thailand	
46	Loss	42–4	Nobuto Ikehara	TKO	3 (10)	Jan 15, 2006	IMP Hall, Osaka, Japan	
45	Win	42–3	Rodel Orais	TKO	3 (12)	Jul 29, 2005	Sukhumwit Market, Bangna, Bangkok, Thailand	Retained WBC Asian super-flyweight title
44	Win	41–3	Joel Avila	KO	5 (12)	May 27, 2005	Sara Buri, Thailand	Retained WBC Asian super-flyweight title
43	Win	40–3	Dragon Zheng	TKO	6 (12)	Mar 25, 2005	City Hall, Samut Songkhram, Thailand	Retained WBC Asian super-flyweight title
42	Win	39–3	Leo Escobido	KO	6 (12)	Jan 14, 2005	Central Stadium, Phitsanulok, Thailand	Retained WBC Asian super-flyweight title
41	Win	38–3	Katsumi Makiyama	TKO	8 (12)	Oct 29, 2004	Central Stadium, Phitsanulok, Thailand	Retained WBC Asian super-flyweight title
40	Win	37–3	Jojo Rodrigo	KO	3 (12)	Sep 24, 2004	Laksi Plaza, Bangkok, Thailand	Retained WBC Asian super-flyweight title
39	Win	36–3	Daothai Kiatkamjorn	TKO	5 (10)	Jul 15, 2004	Nonthai District, Nakhon Ratchasima, Thailand	
38	Win	35–3	Jimboy Rodriguez	UD	12	May 21, 2004	Nonthai District, Nakhon Ratchasima, Thailand	Retained WBC Asian super-flyweight title
37	Win	34–3	Edmund Nonong Develleres	TKO	4 (12)	Mar 26, 2004	Por Kungpao Restaurant, Bangkok, Thailand	Retained WBC Asian super-flyweight title
36	Loss	33–3	Joven Jorda	KO	4 (6)	Jan 3, 2004	Channel 7 Studios, Bangkok, Thailand	
35	Win	33–2	Rodel Orais	TKO	5 (10)	Oct 24, 2003	Ratchaburi, Thailand	Retained WBC Asian super-flyweight title
34	Win	32–2	Rodel Orais	TKO	3 (10)	Aug 9, 2003	Khon Kaen, Thailand	Retained WBC Asian super-flyweight title
33	Win	31–2	Jun Magsipoc	KO	5 (12)	May 5, 2003	Bangkok, Thailand	Retained WBC Asian super-flyweight title
32	Win	30–2	Archie Villamor	KO	4 (12)	Mar 14, 2003	Roi-Et, Thailand	Retained WBC Asian super-flyweight title
31	Win	29–2	Alfren Bulala	UD	12	Jan 31, 2003	Bangkok, Thailand	Won vacant WBC Asian super-flyweight title
30	Win	28–2	Rey Llagas	KO	5 (8)	Nov 26, 2002	Bangkok, Thailand	
29	Win	27–2	Jun Magsipoc	UD	8	Sep 6, 2002	Future Park Plaza, Rangsit, Thailand	
28	Win	26–2	Rolly Mandahinog	TKO	4 (6)	Jul 5, 2002	Maepranom Industry, Bangkok, Thailand	
27	Win	25–2	Rolly Mandahinog	UD	6	Apr 19, 2002	Provincial gymnasium, Khon Kaen, Thailand	
26	Win	24–2	Yosuke Kobayashi	KO	9 (10)	Jul 7, 2001	International Conference Hall, Nagoya, Japan	
25	Loss	23–2	Alfren Bulala	TKO	6 (10)	Mar 2, 2001	Phichit, Thailand	
24	Win	23–1	Rey Llagas	PTS	10	Dec 29, 2000	Koh Kong Island, Cambodia	
23	Win	22–1	Ramil Anito	TKO	7 (10)	Sep 22, 2000	Sara Buri, Thailand	
22	Win	21–1	Noel Sungahid	TKO	3 (10)	Jun 23, 2000	Bangkok, Thailand	
21	Loss	20–1	Malcolm Tuñacao	TKO	7 (12)	May 19, 2000	Srimnang Outdoor Arena, Udon Thani, Thailand	Lost WBC flyweight title
20	Win	20–0	Masaki Kawabata	UD	12	Feb 25, 2000	Mahachai Villa Arena, Samut Sakhon, Thailand	Retained WBC flyweight title
19	Win	19–0	Manny Pacquiao	TKO	3 (12)	Sep 17, 1999	Pakpanag Metropolitan Stadium, Nakhon Si Thammarat, Thailand	Won vacant WBC flyweight title
18	Win	18–0	Eddie Felisilda	KO	3 (?)	May 21, 1999	National Stadium, Sara Buri, Thailand	
17	Win	17–0	Rogelio Lapian	TKO	5 (8)	Apr 30, 1999	Thung Song, Thailand	
16	Win	16–0	Rolando Baclayo	PTS	8	Mar 6, 1999	Buddamonton, Thailand	
15	Win	15–0	Ramil Gevero	KO	3 (?)	Dec 29, 1998	Bangkok, Thailand	
14	Win	14–0	Jerry Pahayahay	UD	10	Nov 14, 1998	Bangkok, Thailand	
13	Win	13–0	Ernesto Rubillar	TKO	5 (10)	Sep 20, 1998	Samut Prakan, Thailand	
12	Win	12–0	Juanito Rubillar	KO	9 (10)	Aug 12, 1998	Ratchadaphisek, Thailand	
11	Win	11–0	Kaaj Chartbandit	KO	3 (?)	Jun 5, 1998	Bangkok, Thailand	
10	Win	10–0	Jerwin Balaba	TKO	8 (?)	May 1, 1998	Kanchanaburi Stadium, Kanchanaburi, Thailand	
9	Win	9–0	Alpong Navaja	PTS	10	Feb 6, 1998	Bangkok, Thailand	
8	Win	8–0	Ramil Gevero	PTS	10	Nov 21, 1997	Sawananan School, Sawankalok, Sukhothai, Thailand	
7	Win	7–0	Rodolfo Guilos	KO	3 (6)	Sep 26, 1997	Provincial Stadium, Sara Buri, Thailand	
6	Win	6–0	Rodolfo Guilos	KO	3 (6)	Aug 1, 1997	Prince Palace Hotel, Bangkok, Thailand	
5	Win	5–0	Roy Tarazona	TKO	4 (?)	Jun 24, 1997	Bangkok, Thailand	
4	Win	4–0	Alpong Navaja	PTS	8	May 2, 1997	Ban Rai Temple, Nakhon Ratchasima, Thailand	
3	Win	3–0	Ramil Gevero	PTS	8	Mar 28, 1997	Pak Kret Stadium, Pak Kret, Thailand	
2	Win	2–0	Ramon Algora	KO	2 (6)	Mar 7, 1997	Central Stadium, Loei, Thailand	
1	Win	1–0	Roy Clave	PTS	6	Jan 30, 1997	Provincial Stadium, Chumphon, Thailand	

== See also ==
- Lineal championship
- List of world flyweight boxing champions

Sporting positions
Regional boxing titles
Vacant Title last held by Peesaddaeng Kiatsakthanee	WBC Asian super-flyweight champion 31 January 2003 – 2005; Vacated	Vacant Title next held by Pitakpong Thamma
World boxing titles
Vacant Title last held by Manny Pacquiao	WBC flyweight champion 17 September 1999 – 19 May 2000	Succeeded by Malcolm Tuñacao
