= Daiki Kameda =

Japanese boxer (born 1989)

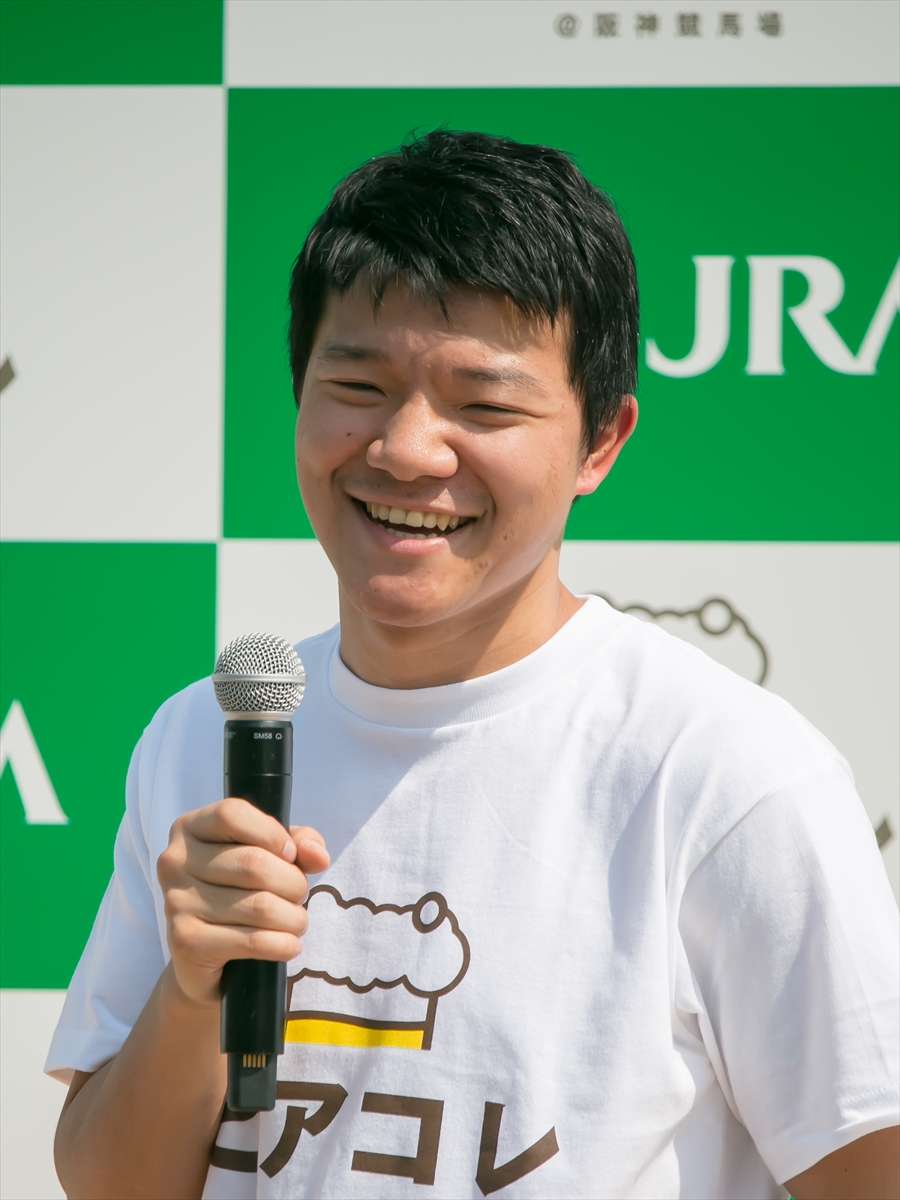
- Kameda in 2016

Personal information
- Nickname: Monk Warrior of Osaka (浪速乃弁慶)
- Born: 亀田 大毅; January 6, 1989 (age 37) Osaka, Japan
- Height: 5 ft 6 in (168 cm)
- Weight: Flyweight; Super-flyweight

Boxing career
- Reach: 64 1/2 in (164 cm)
- Stance: Orthodox

Boxing record
- Total fights: 34
- Wins: 29
- Win by KO: 18
- Losses: 5

Daiki Kameda (亀田 大毅, Kameda Daiki) (born January 6, 1989) is a Japanese former professional boxer who competed from 2006 to 2015. He is a two-weight world champion, having held the World Boxing Association (WBA) flyweight title from 2010 to 2011, and the International Boxing Federation (IBF) super-flyweight title from 2013 to 2014. His brothers, Kōki and Tomoki, are also professional boxers.

== Professional career ==
=== Personal life and early career ===
Daiki is one of the three Kameda brothers, the other two are the former WBA (Regular) Bantamweight Champion, Kōki, and the former WBO Bantamweight Champion, Tomoki.

Nicknamed Naniwa no Benkei (Benkei of Osaka) by his father, Shirō, he made his professional debut on February 26, 2006. "You must never fall down, until I decide to throw in a towel or a referee calls a stop," Shirō said to him. "Fight like Benkei who died while standing up."

In his early career, he had made it his custom to sing a song for the audience after each of his victories.

=== Controversy ===
Kameda lost to Daisuke Naito, then the WBC flyweight champion, in Naito's first title defense on October 11, 2007. Despite making comments before the match that he would commit seppuku if he lost, his manager later confirmed that he would not. His boxer's license was suspended by the Japan Boxing Commission for one year due to professional misconduct during the match.

Kameda resorted to elbowing and Professional wrestling bodyslams out of frustration during his bout with Naito because he was behind on points and the crowd was against him from the beginning.

Up until this point Kameda's father who was his chief second, has said that he will not seek to have his seconds license reinstated after being suspended indefinitely for his role in the controversy and that he will step down as a trainer altogether. Fans and analysts are divided on whether or not Shiro Kameda will return to training regardless of the statements he has made in the press. However, some believe that he is sincere so as to prevent any further controversy surrounding his sons' future fights.

After winning the WBA World Flyweight Title in a rematch against Denkaosan Kaovichit in Kobe in 2010, he relinquished his title in January 2011, in order to move up to the Junior Bantamweight division. Kameda would be successful in his second weight class by winning the vacant IBF Super flyweight title against Mexican boxer Rodrigo Guerrero.

== Professional boxing record ==
34 fights	29 wins	5 losses
By knockout	18	0
By decision	11	5

No.	Result	Record	Opponent	Type	Round, time	Date	Location	Notes
34	Loss	29–5	Victor Ruiz	SD	8	6 Sep 2015	American Bank Center, Corpus Christi, Texas, U.S.	
33	Loss	29–4	Liborio Solís	SD	12	3 Dec 2013	Prefectural Gymnasium, Osaka, Japan	For vacant WBA super-flyweight title
32	Win	29–3	Rodrigo Guerrero	UD	12	3 Sep 2013	Sun Messe Kagawa, Takamatsu, Japan	Won vacant IBF super-flyweight title
31	Win	28–3	Aaron Bobadilla	TKO	6 (10), 0:12	8 Jun 2013	Congress Center, Nagoya, Japan	
30	Win	27–3	Faustino Cupul	KO	6 (10), 0:43	9 Mar 2013	Cultural Gymnasium, Yokohama, Japan	
29	Win	26–3	James Mokoginta	UD	10	4 Dec 2012	Prefectural Gymnasium, Osaka, Japan	
28	Win	25–3	Pipat Chaiporn	UD	10	19 Aug 2012	Sun Messe Kagawa, Takamatsu, Japan	
27	Win	24–3	Jovanny Soto	TKO	4 (10), 0:21	25 Jun 2012	Korakuen Hall, Tokyo, Japan	
26	Win	23–3	Amorn Longsriphom	KO	2 (10), 2:53	4 Apr 2012	Yokohama Arena, Yokohama, Japan	
25	Loss	22–3	Tepparith Singwancha	UD	12	7 Dec 2011	Prefectural Gymnasium, Osaka, Japan	For WBA super-flyweight title
24	Win	22–2	Raul Hidalgo	KO	1 (12), 2:20	24 Sep 2011	Centro de Convenciones, Cozumel, Mexico	Won vacant WBA International super-flyweight title
23	Win	21–2	Prayoot Kamsuanjik	KO	2 (10), 1:42	8 Jul 2011	Kyuden Gym, Fukuoka, Japan	
22	Win	20–2	Jesús Martínez	KO	5 (10), 0:37	2 Apr 2011	Onoyama Budokan, Naha, Japan	
21	Win	19–2	Silviu Olteanu	SD	12	26 Dec 2010	Super Arena, Saitama, Japan	Retained WBA flyweight title
20	Win	18–2	Takefumi Sakata	UD	12	25 Sep 2010	Big Sight, Tokyo, Japan	Retained WBA flyweight title
19	Win	17–2	Rosendo Vega	UD	10	25 Jul 2010	Prefectural Gymnasium, Osaka, Japan	
18	Win	16–2	Denkaosan Kaovichit	UD	12	7 Feb 2010	World Memorial Hall, Kobe, Japan	Won WBA flyweight title
17	Loss	15–2	Denkaosan Kaovichit	MD	12	6 Oct 2009	Municipal Central Gymnasium, Osaka, Japan	For WBA flyweight title
16	Win	15–1	Jose Alberto Cuadros	KO	4 (10), 0:30	30 Aug 2009	Prefectural Gymnasium, Osaka, Japan	
15	Win	14–1	Gabriel Pumar	UD	10	13 May 2009	Korakuen Hall, Tokyo, Japan	
14	Win	13–1	Wandee Singwangcha	KO	6 (10), 0:27	4 Mar 2009	Super Arena, Saitama, Japan	
13	Win	12–1	Isaac Bustos	KO	3 (10), 2:30	8 Dec 2008	South Gym, Oyama, Japan	
12	Win	11–1	Angel Rezago	KO	5 (10), 1:47	6 Nov 2008	Korakuen Hall, Tokyo, Japan	
11	Loss	10–1	Daisuke Naito	UD	12	11 Oct 2007	Ariake Coliseum, Tokyo, Japan	For WBC flyweight title
10	Win	10–0	Piyapong Sorsawaeng	UD	10	28 Jul 2007	Ariake Coliseum, Tokyo, Japan	
9	Win	9–0	Pingping Tepura	KO	2 (10), 2:21	30 Apr 2007	Twin Messe, Shizuoka, Japan	
8	Win	8–0	Vicky Tahumil	KO	3 (10), 1:18	23 Feb 2007	Prefectural Sogo Gym, Sapporo, Japan	
7	Win	7–0	Mohammed Sadik	KO	1 (10), 0:37	20 Dec 2006	Ariake Coliseum, Tokyo, Japan	
6	Win	6–0	Valerio Sanchez	MD	8	27 Sep 2006	Korakuen Hall, Tokyo, Japan	
5	Win	5–0	Wido Paez	KO	1 (8), 1:45	20 Aug 2006	Cultural Gymnasium, Yokohama, Japan	
4	Win	4–0	Yoppie Benu	TKO	5 (8), 0:27	5 Jun 2006	Korakuen Hall, Tokyo, Japan	
3	Win	3–0	Kittiphop Kawponkanpim	KO	1 (8), 1:31	5 May 2006	Ariake Coliseum, Tokyo, Japan	
2	Win	2–0	Samart Twingym	UD	6	17 Apr 2006	Korakuen Hall, Tokyo, Japan	
1	Win	1–0	Panmee Samart	KO	1 (6), 0:23	26 Feb 2006	Pacifico Yokohama, Yokohama, Japan	

== Titles in boxing ==
=== Major world titles ===
- WBA flyweight champion (112 lbs)
- IBF super-flyweight champion (115 lbs)

=== Regional/International titles ===
- WBA International super-flyweight champion (115 lbs)

== See also ==
- List of flyweight boxing champions
- List of super-flyweight boxing champions
- List of Japanese boxing world champions
- Notable boxing families

Sporting positions
World boxing titles
Preceded by Denkaosan Kaovichit	WBA flyweight champion February 7, 2010 – January 4, 2011; Vacated	Succeeded by Luis Concepción promoted from interim status
Vacant Title last held by Juan Carlos Sánchez Jr.	IBF super-flyweight champion September 3, 2013 – March 19, 2014; Vacated	Vacant Title next held by Zolani Tete
