= Richie Mepranum =

Filipino boxer

Personal information
- Nickname: Magnum
- Nationality: Filipino
- Born: Richie Mepranum; May 5, 1987 (age 39) Maasim, Sarangani, Philippines
- Height: 165 cm (5 ft 5 in)
- Weight: Flyweight

Boxing career
- Stance: Southpaw

Boxing record
- Total fights: 49
- Wins: 38
- Win by KO: 11
- Losses: 10
- Draws: 1

Richie Mepranum (born May 5, 1987) is a Filipino professional boxer.

== Fighting style ==
A boxer and a counter-puncher, Mepranum is considered one of the Philippines' kept secrets.

== Professional career ==
=== Flyweight ===
Mepranum made his professional debut on August 31, 2005, defeating fellow Filipino boxer Leovimil Florentino by KO in Magpet, Cotabato (del Norte), Philippines.

The Filipino boxer won the WBO Oriental flyweight title on June 14, 2006, against previously unbeaten Joma Funda. The bout was held at the Maasim Gym in Maasim, Sarangani, Philippines; Mepranum won the bout by unanimous decision with the scores of 119–109, 119-109 and 120–108.

Mepranum suffered his first loss on September 14, 2007, against Thai boxer Denkaosan Kaovichit at the Potawattana Saenee School, Ratchaburi, Thailand. Kaovichit won by unanimous decision with the scores of 116–112, 115–113, 116–112. Kaovichit became a world champion a year later, in a bout against Japan's Takefumi Sakata for the WBA World Flyweight title. He bounced back by defeating Rocky Fuentes by split decision.

On March 12, 2010, Mepranum fought against Mexico's unbeaten Hernan "Tyson" Marquez (27–0; 20 KO) at the Gaylord Hotel in Grapevine, Texas, United States. The Filipino boxer defeated Marquez with an impressive unanimous decision, with the scores of 99–91, 96–94, 98–92.

In June 2010, Mepranum fought for the vacant WBO Flyweight title relinquished by Argentina's Omar Andrés Narváez. The Filipino boxer took on Mexico's Julio César Miranda (31–5–1; 24 KO) on June 12, 2010, at the Convention Center in Puebla, Mexico. Miranda was a veteran fighter with 37 fights and has fought for a world title twice which the Mexican failed to win. Mepranum was defeated by TKO in round 5 and Miranda was crowned WBO flyweight champion. The bout did not start well for Miranda. The Mexican, however, took the pace in the next round, sending Mepranum down twice to the canvas, once in the 4th round and once in the fifth. The referee stopped the fight after the second knockdown, to avoid any more punishment.

Mepranum's next fight was held on November 13, 2010, on the undercard of the Pacquiao vs. Margarito boxing match. His opponent was Anthony Villareal, who lost to Milan Melindo in January 2010. The Sarangani native won the bout by split decision.

== Professional boxing record ==
49 fights	38 wins	10 losses
By knockout	12	8
By decision	26	2
Draws	1	

No.	Result	Record	Opponent	Type	Round, Time	Date	Location	Notes
49	Loss	38–10–1	Jerwin Ancajas	TKO	2 (12), 2:20	25 Jan 2025	Public Plaza, Iligan, Philippines	For vacant Philippines GAB super bantamweight title
48	Win	38–9–1	Kim Lindog	UD	8	26 Aug 2024	Almendras Gym, Davao City, Philippines	
47	Win	37–9–1	Dexter Alimento	RTD	1 (6), 3:00	9 Mar 2023	Norala, Cotabato del Sur, Philippines	
46	Loss	36–9–1	Sam Goodman	TKO	6 (10), 0:48	22 Dec 2021	The Star Event Centre, Sydney, Australia	For vacant WBO Oriental super bantamweight title
45	Win	36–8–1	Nicardo Calamba	KO	2 (6)	29 Oct 2021	SanMan Gym, General Santos City, Philippines	
44	Win	35–8–1	Jetly Purisima	KO	2 (6), 2:15	2 Dec 2019	Robinson's Place, General Santos City, Philippines	
43	Loss	34–8–1	Ludumo Lamati	RTD	10 (12), 3:00	28 Jul 2019	Orient Theatre, East London, South Africa	For vacant IBF Inter-continental super bantamweight title
42	Win	34–7–1	Sen Chen	MD	10	1 Jun 2019	Wynn Palace Cotai, Macao, Macau	Won vacant IBF Pan Pacific super bantamweight title
41	Win	33–7–1	Rodel Tejares	MD	6	29 Jul 2018	Robinson's Mall, General Santos City, Philippines	
40	Win	32–7–1	Jestonie Makiputin	KO	2 (8), 1:05	25 Mar 2018	Gaisano Mall of Toril, Davao City, Philippines	
39	Loss	31–7–1	Arthur Villanueva	RTD	4 (10), 3:00	16 Sep 2017	Waterfront Hotel and Casino, Cebu City, Philippines	
38	Loss	31–6–1	Luis Nery	TKO	2 (10), 0:41	22 Oct 2016	Auditorio Municipal Fausti Gutiérrez Moreno, Tijuana, Mexico	
37	Loss	31–5–1	Carlos Cuadras	RTD	8 (12), 3:00	23 Apr 2016	Centro de Usos Multiples, Los Mochis, Mexico	For WBC super flyweight title
36	Win	31–4–1	Marjhun Tabamo	TKO	6 (12)	14 Nov 2015	Maasim Municipal Gymnasium, Maasim, Philippines	Won vacant WBU super flyweight title
35	Win	30–4–1	Jetly Purisima	UD	10	14 Aug 2015	SM City Annex, Ecoland, Davao City, Philippines	
34	Win	29–4–1	Jomar Ministerio	TKO	5 (10), 0:44	15 Feb 2015	Kabasalan Municipal Gym, Kabasalan, Philippines	
33	Win	28–4–1	Albert Alcoy	UD	8	27 Sep 2014	Maasim, Sarangani, Philippines	
32	Loss	27–4–1	Juan Francisco Estrada	RTD	9 (12), 3:00	26 Apr 2014	Centro Convenciones, Puerto Penasco, Mexico	For WBA (Super) and WBO flyweight titles
31	Win	27–3–1	Phupha Por Nobnom	RTD	4 (10), 3:00	22 Deb 2014	Oval Plaza Covered Court, General Santos City, Philippines	
30	Win	26–3–1	Jessie Tuyor	UD	10	20 Jul 2013	Iligan City, Lanao del Norte, Philippines	
29	Loss	25–3–1	Hernán Márquez	UD	10	24 Mar 2012	Centro de Usos Multiples, Ciudad Obregon, Mexico	
28	Win	25–2–1	Rigoberto Casillas	UD	8	27 Oct 2011	San Manuel Indian Casino, Highland, California, U.S.	
27	Win	24–2–1	Valentin Leon	UD	6	24 Sep 2011	Auditorio del Estado, Mexicali, Mexico	
26	Win	23–2–1	Anthony Villareal	SD	6	13 Nov 2010	Cowboys Stadium, Arlington, Texas, U.S.	
25	Loss	22–2–1	Julio César Miranda	TKO	5 (12), 2:41	12 Jun 2010	Centro de Convenciones, Puebla, Mexico	For vacant WBO flyweight title
24	Win	22–1–1	Hernán Márquez	UD	10	12 Mar 2010	Gaylord Hotel, Grapevine, Texas, U.S.	
23	Win	21–1–1	Ernie Marquez	SD	6	14 Nov 2009	MGM Grand Garden Arena, Paradise, Nevada, U.S.	
22	Win	20–1–1	Cesar Lopez	UD	6	6 Dec 2008	MGM Grand, Grand Garden Arena, Paradise, Nevada, U.S.	
21	Win	19–1–1	Lowie Bantigue	UD	8	27 Jul 2008	Zamboanga City (Mayor Vitaliano D. Agan) Coliseum, Barangay Tetuan, Zamboanga City, Philippines	
20	Win	18–1–1	Juma Fundi	UD	12	14 Jun 2008	Maasim Municipal Gym, Maasim, Philippines	Won WBO Oriental flyweight title
19	Win	17–1–1	Roldan Malinao	TKO	1 (10), 1:59	30 Apr 2008	Digos City, Davao del Sur, Philippines	
18	Win	16–1–1	Allan Ranada	UD	10	15 Jan 2008	Maasim Municipal Gymnasium, Maasim, Philippines	Retained PBF flyweight title
17	Win	15–1–1	Rocky Fuentes	SD	8	2 Dec 2007	Araneta Coliseum, Barangay Cubao, Quezon City, Philippines	
16	Loss	14–1–1	Denkaosan Kaovichit	UD	12	14 Sep 2007	Potawattana Saenee School, Ratchaburi, Thailand	For PABA flyweight title
15	Win	14–0–1	Philip Parcon	MD	10	4 Aug 2007	Lagao Gym, General Santos City, Philippines	Retained PBF flyweight title
14	Win	13–0–1	Philip Parcon	SD	10	19 Jun 2007	Maasim, Sarangani, Philippines	Retained PBF flyweight title
13	Win	12–0–1	Noel Veronque	TKO	7 (10), 0:50	10 Feb 2007	Maasim, Sarangani, Philippines	
12	Win	11–0–1	Rex Madrid	UD	10	8 Dec 2006	Zamboanga City (Mayor Vitaliano D. Agan) Coliseum, Barangay Tetuan, Zamboanga City, Philippines	Won PBF flyweight title
11	Win	10–0–1	Flash Villacura	TKO	6 (10)	25 Nov 2006	Alabel, Sarangani, Philippines	
10	Win	9–0–1	Nelson Guindolan	UD	10	29 Sep 2006	Maasim, Sarangani, Philippines	
9	Win	8–0–1	Nelson Llanos	UD	8	6 Sep 2006	Zamboanga del Norte, Philippines	
8	Win	7–0–1	Rex Madrid	UD	8	28 Jul 2006	Talibon Municipal Gym, Talibon, Philippines	
7	Draw	6–0–1	Efren Huesca	MD	6	2 Jul 2006	Araneta Coliseum, Barangay Cubao, Quezon City, Philippines	
6	Win	6–0	Rodel Lamela	UD	8	24 May 2006	Talibon, Bohol, Philippines	
5	Win	5–0	Joe Galamition	UD	6	25 Mar 2006	Amphitheater, Cagayan de Oro City, Philippines	
4	Win	4–0	Roland Gepollo	UD	4	18 Mar 2006	Kidapawan City Gymnasium, Barangay Amas, Kidapawan City, Philippines	
3	Win	3–0	Rommel Verdijo	KO	3 (6), 0:29	14 Jan 2006	Maasim Municipal Gymnasium, Maasim, Philippines	
2	Win	2–0	Jose Samson Martin	UD	4	5 Nov 2005	San Andres Civic & Sports Center, District of Malate, Manila, Philippines	
1	Win	1–0	Leovimil Florentino	KO	1 (4)	31 Aug 2005	Magpet, Cotabato del Norte, Philippines	

== Titles in boxing ==
=== Regional titles ===
- PBF (Philippines Boxing Federation) Flyweight title - December 8, 2006
- WBO Oriental Flyweight title - June 14, 2008
- IBF Pan Pacific Super Bantamweight title - June 1, 2019

=== Minor world titles ===
- WBU Super Flyweight title - November 14, 2015
