= Catasetum cochabambanum =

Scientific classification
- Kingdom: Plantae
- Clade: Tracheophytes
- Clade: Angiosperms
- Clade: Monocots
- Order: Asparagales
- Family: Orchidaceae
- Subfamily: Epidendroideae
- Genus: Catasetum
- Species: C. cochabambanum

Binomial name
- Catasetum cochabambanum Dodson & R.Vásquez
- The distribution of Catasetum cochabambanum

Species of orchid

Catasetum cochabambanum, the Cochabamba catasetum, is an epiphytic pseudobulbeous species of orchid endemic to Bolivia. It grows in low, moist, and subtropical forests.

== Description ==
Catasetum cochabambanum is a medium, hot growing epiphyte that blooms in the fall with fusiform pseudobulbs and 3 cm (1.2 in) flowers. Flowers are commonly yellowish-green in color with yellow lips and yellowish-green petals; petals may have stripes and spots of similar colors to maroon or burgundy. It has the ability to shoot pollinium on its pollinators which are usually Euglossine bees.

== Care ==
Catasetum cochabambanum needs a lux level of around 45,000, a shade level of around 55%, and a humidity level of 70%. It also goes into a leaf-drop state during winter like other Catasetum species.

== Taxonomy and etymology ==
Catasetum cochabambanum was first formally described in the Icones Plantarum Tropicarum that was published by the Marie Selby Botanical Gardens specifically in series 2, volume 3, plate 207.
