= Arthur Villanueva =

Filipino boxer (born 1989)

Personal information
- Nicknames: "King Arthur" "El Matador"
- Nationality: (Philippines) Filipino
- Born: Arthur Cordero Villanueva; 20 January 1989 (age 37) Bago, Negros Occidental, Philippines
- Height: 5 ft 5 in (1.65 m)
- Weight: Super Flyweight Bantamweight

Boxing career
- Reach: 68 in (173 cm)
- Stance: Orthodox

Boxing record
- Total fights: 42
- Wins: 35
- Win by KO: 20
- Losses: 6
- Draws: 1

Arthur Villanueva (born January 20, 1989) is a Filipino professional boxer. He is currently under the Bantamweight division.

== Early life ==
Villanueva is the second youngest of 12 children in their family. His father died when he was 15, leaving his mother to raise the family. To help his mother, he started driving a tricycle, making him to earn as much as 100 pesos (US$2.50) a day. Despite these hardships, he was able to finish high school and immediately proceeded to college with AB Mathematics course.

King as often called by his friends, is also an avid chess player. He earned 4 medals competing inner-city chess tournaments during his elementary and high school years. According to him, one of his greatest achievement, was coming in 2nd place in a tournament in 2004 against the best players in their hometown.

The young Villanueva started boxing at the age of 16 and lost only 7 out of his 50 amateur fights. He turned professional at the age of 19.

== Professional career ==
Villanueva made his professional debut on November 29, 2008, at the age of 19, defeating fellow debutant Alan Magno via TKO in the second round at PAGCOR Hotel and Casino, Goldenfield Commercial Complex, Bacolod, Negros Occidental, Philippines.

On August 1, 2010, Villanueva won the vacant Philippines Games and Amusement Board (GAB) flyweight title via TKO in the 7th round against Brix Ray.

On December 19, 2012, "King" Arthur Villanueva won the vacant Oriental and Pacific Boxing Federation (OPBF) super flyweight title via unanimous decision against the Japanese Taiki Eto in a fight held at Korakuen Hall, Bunkyo, Tokyo.

On July 13, 2013, Villanueva captured the vacant WBO Asia Pacific super flyweight title by defeating a Mexican fighter Arturo "Fuerte" Badillo via TKO on the 4th round.

On October 26, 2013, at the Pinoy Pride XXII, Villanueva won the vacant WBO International super flyweight title after his devastation of Mexico's Edgar Martinez of whom he dropped twice on the very first round.

During the Pinoy Pride XXVII held at Dubai World Trade Centre, Dubai, United Arab Emirates, Arthur Villanueva gained the IBF International Jr Bantamweight title by stopping Henry 'El Crespo' Maldonado of Nicaragua via split decision, scoring 117-110 and 116-113 from two judges.

On July 19, 2015, "King" lost via controversial technical decision on former olympian Mcjoe Arroyo for the vacant world title. On November 28, 2015, Villanueva claimed the new WBC International Super Flyweight belt after he won their fight against Mexican Victor "Spock" Mendez via split decision in the main fight of Pinoy Pride 34 held at Hoops Dome, Lapu-Lapu City.

== Professional boxing record ==
42 fights	35 wins	6 losses
By knockout	20	3
By decision	15	3
Draws	1	

No.	Result	Record	Opponent	Type	Round, time	Date	Location	Notes
42	Loss	35–6–1	Saul Sanchez	UD	8	2024-07-12	Overtime Elite Arena, Atlanta, Georgia, U.S.	
41	Loss	35–5–1	Elijah Pierce	TKO	4 (8) 2:57	2024-03-29	Overtime Elite Arena, Atlanta Georgia	
40	Win	35–4–1	Chatre Buakaewdee	TKO	4 (6) 1:43	2023-06-29	Spaceplus Bangkok RCA, Bangkok, Thailand	
39	Win	34–4–1	Saengthong Tor Buamas	KO	9 (10) 1:28	2022-06-11	Lalak Jan Stadium, Gilgit, Pakistan	
38	Win	33–4–1	Bryan Tamayo	UD	6	2021-03-27	IPI Compound, Mandaue City, Philippines	
37	Loss	32–4–1	Nordine Oubaali	RTD	6 (12) 3:00	2019-07-06	Barys Arena, Nur-Sultan, Kazakhstan	
36	Draw	32–3–1	Carlo Demecillo	MD	10	2018-11-24	IEC Convention Center, Barangay Mabolo, Cebu City, Philippines	
35	Win	32–3	Renren Tesorio	TKO	7 (10) 0:42	2018-06-09	Maasin City Sports Complex (Maasin City Gym), Maasin City, Philippines	
34	Loss	31–3	Luis Nery	TKO	6 (10)	2017-11-4	Estadio Gasmart, Tijuana, Mexico	
33	Win	31–2	Richie Mepranum	RTD	4 (10)	2017-09-16	Waterfront Hotel, Cebu City, Philippines	
32	Loss	30–2	Zolani Tete	UD	12	2017-04-22	Leicester Arena, Leicester, Leicestershire, UK	For WBO interim bantamweight title
31	Win	30–1	Juan Jimenez	KO	2 (12)	2016-09-24	StubHub Center, Carson, California, USA	Retained WBO Asia Pacific bantamweight title
30	Win	29–1	Juan Jimenez	KO	4 (12)	2016-05-28	La Salle Coliseum, Bacolod, Negros Occidental, Philippines	Won WBO Asia Pacific bantamweight title
29	Win	28–1	Victor Mendez	SD	12	2015-11-28	Hoops Dome, Lapu-Lapu, Cebu, Philippines	Won WBC International super flyweight title.
28	Loss	27–1	McJoe Arroyo	TD	10 (12)	2015-07-19	Don Haskin Convention Center El Paso, Texas, USA	For the vacant IBF super flyweight title
27	Win	27–0	Julio César Miranda	UD	10	2015-02-07	University of Southeastern Philippines Gym, Obrero, Davao City, Davao del Sur, Philippines	
26	Win	26–0	Henry Maldonado	SD	12	2014-09-05	Dubai World Trade Centre, Dubai, United Arab Emirates	Won vacant IBF International super flyweight title
25	Win	25–0	Fernando Aguilar	UD	10	2014-03-01	Solaire Resort & Casino, Parañaque, Metro Manila, Philippines	
24	Win	24–0	Edgar Martinez	KO	1(12), 1:49	2013-10-26	Cebu City Waterfront Hotel & Casino, Lahug, Cebu City, Cebu, Philippines	Won vacant WBO International super flyweight title.
23	Win	23–0	Arturo Badillo	TKO	4(12), 2:03	2013-07-13	Solaire Resort & Casino, Parañaque, Metro Manila, Philippines	Won vacant WBO Asia Pacific super flyweight title.
22	Win	22–0	Marco Demecillo	UD	12	2013-04-20	University of Southeastern Philippines Gym, Obrero, Davao City, Davao del Sur, Philippines	Retained OPBF super flyweight title
21	Win	21–0	Taiki Eto	UD	12	2012-12-19	Korakuen Hall, Bunkyo, Tokyo, Japan	Won vacant OPBF super flyweight title
20	Win	20–0	Pramuansak Phosuwan	UD	8	2012-09-22	Cebu City Waterfront Hotel & Casino, Lahug, Cebu City, Cebu, Philippines	
19	Win	19–0	Jeffrey Cerna	SD	8	2012-06-02	Resorts World Hotel, Newport Performing Arts Theatre, Pasay, Metro Manila, Philippines	
18	Win	18–0	Rey Megrino	UD	8(8)	2012-03-24	Cebu City Waterfront Hotel & Casino, Lahug, Cebu City, Cebu, Philippines	
17	Win	17–0	Rosel Alim	RTD	5(10), 3:00	2011-06-25	Calape Cultural Center, Calape, Bohol, Philippines	
16	Win	16–0	Mark Anthony Geraldo	TD	6(8), 1:52	2011-04-09	University of St. La Salle Coliseum, Bacolod, Negros Oriental, Philippines	Fight stopped due to a cut above Villanueva's right eye produced from an accidental head-butt in Round 6.
15	Win	15–0	Samuel Apuya	TD	1(12), 2:23	2011-02-26	PAGCOR Hotel and Casino, Goldenfield Commercial Complex, Bacolod, Negros Occidental, Philippines	Retained Philippine Games and Amusement Board (GAB) flyweight title
14	Win	14–0	Nicardo Calamba	RTD	5(10), 3:00	2010-11-20	PAGCOR Hotel and Casino, Goldenfield Commercial Complex, Bacolod, Negros Occidental, Philippines	
13	Win	13–0	Brix Ray	TKO	7(12), 2:18	2010-08-01	PAGCOR Hotel and Casino, Goldenfield Commercial Complex, Bacolod, Negros Occidental, Philippines	Won vacant Philippine Games and Amusement Board (GAB) flyweight title
12	Win	12–0	Nicardo Calamba	TKO	5(8), 2010-05-29	2010-05-29	PAGCOR Hotel and Casino, Goldenfield Commercial Complex, Bacolod, Negros Occidental, Philippines	
11	Win	11–0	Daryl Amoncio	KO	2(8), 1:19	2010-04-21	Agustin Gatuslao Memorial Gym, Himamaylan City, Negros Occidental, Philippines	
10	Win	10–0	Sherwin Manatad	KO	7(10), 1:41	2010-02-21	PAGCOR Hotel and Casino, Goldenfield Commercial Complex, Bacolod, Negros Occidental, Philippines	
9	Win	9–0	Jojo Bardon	TKO	6(10), 0:36	2009-12-12	PAGCOR Hotel and Casino, Goldenfield Commercial Complex, Bacolod, Negros Occidental, Philippines	
8	Win	8–0	Daryl Amoncio	TKO	8(10), 1:02	2009-11-28	Municipal Hall of Montevista, Montevista, Compostela Valley, Philippines	
7	Win	7–0	Fabio Marfa	UD	10	2009-10-10	PAGCOR Hotel and Casino, Goldenfield Commercial Complex, Bacolod, Negros Occidental	
6	Win	6–0	Geboi Mansalayao	UD	8	2009-08-29	PAGCOR Hotel and Casino, Goldenfield Commercial Complex, Bacolod, Negros Occidental, Philippines	
5	Win	5–0	Mark Saloma	UD	8	2009-07-11	PAGCOR Hotel and Casino, Goldenfield Commercial Complex, Bacolod, Negros Occidental, Philippines	
4	Win	4–0	Edcel Tunacao	KO	2(6), 0:46	2009-05-30	PAGCOR Hotel and Casino, Goldenfield Commercial Complex, Bacolod, Negros Occidental	
3	Win	3–0	Albert Villacampa	UD	6	2009-03-21	Negros Occidental Multi-Purpose Activity Center (Nompac), Bacolod, Negros Occidental Philippines	
2	Win	2–0	PJ Arong	TKO	4(4), 1:14	2009-02-21	PAGCOR Hotel and Casino, Goldenfield Commercial Complex, Bacolod, Negros Occidental	
1	Win	1–0	Alan Magno	TKO	3(4), 2:48	2008-11-29	PAGCOR Hotel and Casino, Goldenfield Commercial Complex, Bacolod, Negros Occidental, Philippines	Professional debut.

== Regional and Minor Titles ==
- WBO Asia Pacific Bantamweight Title (May 2016)
- WBC International Super Flyweight Title (November 2015)
- IBF International Super Flyweight Title (September 2014)
- WBO International Super Flyweight Title (October 2013)
- WBO Asia Pacific Super Flyweight Title (July 2013)
- OPBF Super Flyweight Title (December 2012)
- Philippines Games and Amusement Board (GAB) Flyweight Title (August 2010)
