= Rayonta Whitfield =

American boxer (born 1981)

Rayonta Whitfield (born July 16, 1981) is an American professional boxer from Augusta, Georgia.

== Amateur career ==
Whitfield was the 2002 Golden Gloves national champion.

== Professional career ==
Whitfield was a two-time North American Boxing Organization flyweight champion.

=== World title fight ===
He fought Omar Andres Narvaez for the World Boxing Organization flyweight title, losing in the 10th round by technical knockout.

=== Return ===
Due to his boxing gym nearly closing, Whitfield took a four-year hiatus from boxing but has now returned. During his hiatus from boxing, Whitfield was able to resurrect the gym and is bringing it back to prominence. He has had several regional and national Silver Gloves and Golden Gloves champions, including Justin DeLoach, Jade Ealy, and Doctress Robinson. Ealy is currently the record holder for fastest debut KO in Georgia. Whitfield is currently signed to Evander Holyfield's Real Deal Boxing.
