= David Quijano =

Puerto Rican boxer (born 1986)

Personal information
- Nationality: Puerto Rican
- Born: David Quijano Garcia; 7 October 1986 (age 39) Caguas, Puerto Rico
- Height: 5 ft 2 in (157 cm)
- Weight: Super flyweight

Boxing career
- Reach: 64 in (163 cm)
- Stance: Orthodox

Boxing record
- Total fights: 24
- Wins: 16
- Win by KO: 9
- Losses: 7
- Draws: 1

David Quijano Garcia (born 7 October 1986) is a Puerto Rican former professional boxer who competed from 2006 to 2016 and challenged for the WBO super flyweight title in 2012.

== Professional career ==
Quijano challenged Omar Narváez for the WBO super flyweight title on 15 December 2012, but was defeated by unanimous decision (UD).

== Professional boxing record ==
24 fights	16 wins	7 losses
By knockout	9	0
By decision	7	7
Draws	1	

No.	Result	Record	Opponent	Type	Round, time	Date	Location	Notes
24	Loss	16–7–1	Ricardo Rodriguez	UD	10	14 Oct 2016	Tony Rosa Community Center, Palm Bay, Florida, U.S.	For WBO Latino super flyweight title
23	Loss	16–6–1	Ricardo Rodriguez	UD	10	24 Jun 2016	A La Carte Event Pavilion, Tampa, Florida, U.S.	Lost WBO Latino super flyweight title
22	Win	16–5–1	Daniel Lozano	UD	10	23 Oct 2015	A La Carte Event Pavilion, Tampa, Florida, U.S.	Won vacant WBO Latino interim super flyweight title
21	Loss	15–5–1	McJoe Arroyo	UD	8	28 Apr 2014	Coliseo Rubén Rodríguez, Bayamón, Puerto Rico	
20	Loss	15–4–1	Emmanuel Rodríguez	UD	8	21 Dec 2013	Coliseo Cosme Beitia Salamo, Cataño, Puerto Rico	
19	Loss	15–3–1	Omar Narváez	UD	12	15 Dec 2012	Hilton Garden Inn Hotel & Casino, San Miguel de Tucumán, Argentina	For WBO super flyweight title
18	Win	15–2–1	Juanito Rubillar	TD	10 (12), 2:30	15 Jun 2012	Civic Center, Kissimmee, Florida, U.S.	Won vacant WBO Latino super flyweight title; Unanimous TD
17	Win	14–2–1	Javier Gallo	UD	10	21 Jan 2012	Coliseo Pedrin Zorrilla, San Juan, Puerto Rico	
16	Loss	13–2–1	Juan Mercedes	UD	10	1 Apr 2011	Coliseo Héctor Solá Bezares, Caguas, Puerto Rico	For vacant WBO interim Latino super flyweight title
15	Win	13–1–1	Antwan Robertson	TKO	3 (6), 2:59	5 Feb 2011	Coliseo Rubén Rodríguez, Bayamón, Puerto Rico	
14	Win	12–1–1	Luis Angel Paneto	KO	4 (8), 2:20	26 Mar 2010	La Cancha Mario Jiménez, Guaynabo, Puerto Rico	
13	Win	11–1–1	Miguel Robles	SD	8	30 Oct 2009	Coliseo Héctor Solá Bezares, Caguas, Puerto Rico	Won vacant WBC–USNBC super flyweight title
12	Win	10–1–1	Angel Lopez	TKO	2 (6), 0:56	12 Sep 2009	José Miguel Agrelot Coliseum, Hato Rey, Puerto Rico	
11	Win	9–1–1	Jesús Martínez	UD	8	25 Apr 2009	Coliseo Rubén Rodríguez, Bayamón, Puerto Rico	
10	Win	8–1–1	Francisco Dominguez	TKO	6 (6), 2:00	30 Aug 2008	Coliseo Rubén Rodríguez, Bayamón, Puerto Rico	
9	Win	7–1–1	Sammir Garcia	TKO	1 (4), 1:48	25 Apr 2008	Coliseo Antonio R. Barcelo, Toa Baja, Puerto Rico	
8	Win	6–1–1	Luis Miguel Ortiz	SD	6	23 Feb 2008	Coliseo Héctor Solá Bezares, Caguas, Puerto Rico	
7	Win	5–1–1	Luis Miguel Ortiz	UD	6	22 Jun 2007	José Miguel Agrelot Coliseum, Hato Rey, Puerto Rico	
6	Loss	4–1–1	Freddy Canate	UD	4	28 Apr 2007	Coliseo Universidad del Norte, Barranquilla, Colombia	
5	Win	4–0–1	Ricardo Blackman	TKO	2 (6), 2:57	2 Feb 2007	Coliseo Pedrin Zorrilla, San Juan, Puerto Rico	
4	Draw	3–0–1	Jose Gonzalez	PTS	4	17 Nov 2006	Mario Morales Coliseum, Guaynabo, Puerto Rico	
3	Win	3–0	Christopher Sanchez	TKO	1 (4), 2:07	30 Sep 2006	Coliseo Héctor Solá Bezares, Caguas, Puerto Rico	
2	Win	2–0	Felix Nazario	KO	1 (4), 1:15	29 Apr 2006	Mario Morales Coliseum, Guaynabo, Puerto Rico	
1	Win	1–0	Jesus Del Valle	TKO	1 (4)	3 Feb 2006	Coliseo Pedrín Zorrilla, Hato Rey, Puerto Rico	
