= Hernán Márquez =

Mexican boxer

Personal information
- Nickname: Tyson
- Born: Hernán Márquez Beltrán; September 4, 1988 (age 37) Empalme, Sonora, Mexico
- Height: 5 ft 2 in (157 cm)
- Weight: Flyweight; Super flyweight

Boxing career
- Reach: 48 in (122 cm)
- Stance: Southpaw

Boxing record
- Total fights: 59
- Wins: 47
- Win by KO: 33
- Losses: 10
- Draws: 2

Hernán Márquez Beltrán (born September 4, 1988), commonly known by his nickname "Tyson" Márquez, is a Mexican professional boxer. He held the WBA flyweight title from 2011 to 2012, and has challenged once for the WBA interim super flyweight title in 2010. Márquez is known for his trilogy of fights against Luis Concepción whom he defeated twice in 2011 and lost to in 2015.

== Professional career ==
Nicknamed "Tyson" due to his aggressive style, Márquez is a hard-hitting southpaw.

Márquez began his professional career on October 21, 2005, with a unanimous decision win over Noe Acosta. On July 25, 2009, he also won the WBC USNBC title with a unanimous decision win against Juan Escuer. Márquez won his following two fights before losing to Richie Mepranum by a 10-round unanimous decision. In his next fight, he moved up to the super flyweight division in order to challenge Nonito Donaire for the interim WBA super flyweight title. He lost the bout by 8th round knock out.

=== WBA flyweight champion ===
After scoring two consecutive wins, he returned to the Flyweight division and faced WBA world champion Luis Concepción. Márquez defeated Concepción by 11th round technical knock out to claim the title and become world champion at the age of 22. In an action filled bout, Márquez rose from a first round knock down to drop the champion later in that same round. He also knocked Concepción down in the third and tenth round before stopping him in the eleventh.

In his first defense, he defeated Edrin Dapudong by third-round knockout.

In his second WBA World Flyweight Title defense he fought Luis Concepcion for the second time in 2011. He stopped Concepcion in round 1 after scoring three knockdowns.

Márquez participated in an International Boxing Federation title eliminator on June 14, 2014, but was dominated and knocked out in eleven rounds by McJoe Arroyo. He was knocked down by the Puerto Rican boxer in the first, fourth, eighth and last rounds.

== Professional boxing record ==
59 fights	47 wins	10 losses
By knockout	33	7
By decision	14	3
Draws	2	

No.	Result	Record	Opponent	Type	Round, time	Date	Location	Notes
59	Win	47–10–2	Luis Concepción	SD	10	Oct 7, 2022	Centro de Usos Múltiples, Hermosillo, Mexico	
58	Win	46–10–2	Jose Rodriguez Villarreal	TKO	2 (8), 2:09	Dec 10, 2021	Vango Club, Zapopan, Mexico	
57	Win	45–10–2	Angel Guevara	TKO	3 (8), 2:53	Oct 8, 2021	Arena Sonora, Hermosillo, Mexico	
56	Win	44–10–2	Juan Arvizu Cota	TKO	4 (10), 1:53	Dec 13, 2019	Gimnasio Municipal, Guaymas, Mexico	
55	Loss	43–10–2	Francisco Rodríguez Jr.	KO	3 (12), 1:20	Oct 20, 2018	Centro de Convenciones, Cozumel, Mexico	For WBC Latino Silver super flyweight title
54	Loss	43–9–2	Jose Briegel Quirino	RTD	9 (10), 3:00	Apr 21, 2018	Domo del Parque San Rafael, Guadalajara, Mexico	
53	Win	43–8–2	Jesús Beltrán	KO	1 (10), 2:33	Nov 18, 2017	Centro de Usos Multiples, Ciudad Obregón, Mexico	
52	Win	42–8–2	Eduardo Hernandez	TD	4 (10), 3:00	Jun 3, 2017	Gimnasio del Estado, Hermosillo, Mexico	Unanimous TD after Márquez was cut from an accidental head clash
51	Draw	41–8–2	Jose Quirino Jr.	SD	8	Apr 1, 2017	Auditorio Fausto Gutierrez Moreno, Tijuana, Mexico	
50	Loss	41–8–1	Iran Diaz	UD	10	Dec 16, 2016	Centro de Usos Múltiples, Ciudad Obregón, Mexico	
49	Win	41–7–1	David Reyes	SD	10	Sep 30, 2016	Palenque de la Expo, Ciudad Obregón, Mexico	
48	Win	40–7–1	Saul Banos	KO	4 (10), 2:50	Jul 23, 2016	Empalme, Mexico	
47	Loss	39–7–1	Luis Concepción	UD	12	Dec 17, 2015	Roberto Durán Arena, Panama City, Panama	For WBA interim super flyweight title
46	Loss	39–6–1	Juan Francisco Estrada	KO	10 (12), 1:16	Sep 26, 2015	Centro de convenciones, Puerto Peñasco, Mexico	For WBA (Super) and WBO flyweight titles
45	Win	39–5–1	Jose Alfredo Tirado	TKO	8 (8), 2:09	Jul 4, 2015	Centro de Usos Multiples, Hermosillo, Mexico	
44	Win	38–5–1	Roberto Lopez	TKO	3 (6), 2:31	Mar 7, 2015	Auditorio Fausto Gutierrez Moreno, Tijuana, Mexico	
43	Draw	37–5–1	Ricardo Roman	SD	8	Dec 6, 2014	Centro de Usos Múltiples, Hermosillo, Mexico	
42	Loss	37–5	McJoe Arroyo	KO	11 (12), 0:47	Jun 14, 2014	Arena Metropolitana Jorge Cuesy Serrano, Tuxtla Gutiérrez, Mexico	
41	Win	37–4	John Mark Apolinario	UD	10	Apr 26, 2014	Centro Convenciones, Puerto Peñasco, Mexico	
40	Loss	36–4	Giovani Segura	KO	12 (12), 2:59	Nov 2, 2013	Centro de Usos Múltiples, Hermosillo, Mexico	
39	Win	36–3	Carlos Tamara	UD	12	Jun 1, 2013	Estadio Sonora, Hermosillo, Mexico	
38	Win	35–3	Edgar Jimenez	TKO	3 (10), 1:44	Apr 19, 2013	Gimnasio del Estado, Hermosillo, Mexico	
37	Loss	34–3	Brian Viloria	TKO	10 (12), 1:01	Nov 17, 2012	Memorial Sports Arena, Los Angeles, California, U.S.	Lost WBA flyweight title; For WBO flyweight title
36	Win	34–2	Fernando Lumacad	MD	10	Jul 14, 2012	Palenque de la Feria Ganadera, Culiacán, Mexico	
35	Win	33–2	Richie Mepranum	UD	10	Mar 24, 2012	Centro de Usos Múltiples, Hermosillo, Mexico	
34	Win	32–2	Luis Concepción	TKO	1 (12), 1:49	Oct 29, 2011	Centro de Usos Múltiples, Hermosillo, Mexico	Retained WBA flyweight title
33	Win	31–2	Edrin Dapudong	TKO	3 (12), 1:49	Jul 2, 2011	Centro de Usos Múltiples, Hermosillo, Mexico	Retained WBA flyweight title
32	Win	30–2	Luis Concepción	TKO	11 (12)	Apr 2, 2011	Roberto Durán Arena, Panama City, Panama	Won WBA flyweight title
31	Win	29–2	Omar Martinez	KO	1 (10), 2:19	Dec 10, 2010	Gimnasio Municipal, Saltillo, Mexico	
30	Win	28–2	Valentin Leon	TKO	5 (10), 2:36	Sep 24, 2010	Centro de Usos Múltiples, Hermosillo, Mexico	
29	Loss	27–2	Nonito Donaire	TKO	8 (12), 2:59	Jul 10, 2010	José Miguel Agrelot Coliseum, San Juan, Puerto Rico	For WBA interim super flyweight title
28	Loss	27–1	Richie Mepranum	UD	10	Mar 12, 2010	Gaylord Texan Resort Hotel & Convention Center, Grapevine, Texas, U.S.	
27	Win	27–0	Ricardo Armenta	KO	2 (8), 1:19	Dec 19, 2009	Arena ITSON, Ciudad Obregón, Mexico	
26	Win	26–0	Darwin Zamora	TKO	6 (10), 0:56	Oct 31, 2009	Deportivo La Inalámbrica, Mérida, Mexico	
25	Win	25–0	Juan Esquer	UD	10	Jul 25, 2009	Palenque del Recinto Ferial, Nuevo Vallarta, Mexico	Won vacant WBC–USNBC flyweight title
24	Win	24–0	Carlos Banuelos	KO	1 (10), 2:36	Jun 6, 2009	Explanada Tecate, Ciudad Obregón, Mexico	
23	Win	23–0	Giovanny Sepulveda	KO	1	Apr 1, 2009	Mexico	
22	Win	22–0	Carlos Rodriguez	TKO	1 (10), 2:45	Oct 4, 2008	Expo Forum, Hermosillo, Mexico	
21	Win	21–0	Jose Espinoza	UD	10	Aug 30, 2008	Expo Forum, Hermosillo, Mexico	
20	Win	20–0	German Meraz	UD	8	Jul 12, 2008	Palenque de la Expo, Hermosillo, Mexico	
19	Win	19–0	Alejandro Sosa	TKO	1 (8)	May 31, 2008	Plaza de Toros El Paseo, San Luis Potosí, Mexico	
18	Win	18–0	Jorge Lopez Palafox	TKO	9 (10), 0:32	May 2, 2008	Palenque del Fex, Mexicali, Mexico	
17	Win	17–0	Alejandro Padilla	KO	2 (10), 1:30	Feb 22, 2008	Expo Forum, Hermosillo, Mexico	
16	Win	16–0	Antonio Garibay	TKO	2 (8)	Dec 15, 2007	Auditorio Benito Juárez, Guadalajara, Mexico	
15	Win	15–0	Baltasar Morales	KO	3 (6), 2:15	Oct 27, 2007	Palenque del Fex, Mexicali, Mexico	
14	Win	14–0	Vicente Maroquin	TKO	3 (12), 0:35	Jul 13, 2007	Centro de Espectáculos Cesar Palace, Hermosillo, Mexico	Won vacant WBA FEDEBOL flyweight title
13	Win	13–0	Jorge Cruz	KO	? (8)	May 4, 2007	Explanada del Carnaval, Guaymas, Mexico	
12	Win	12–0	Jose Manuel Rosas	KO	3 (8)	Mar 10, 2007	Auditorio Municipal, Ciudad Constitución, Mexico	
11	Win	11–0	Fred Heberto Valdez	KO	6 (8)	Dec 15, 2006	Centro de Espectáculos Cesar Palace, Hermosillo, Mexico	
10	Win	10–0	German Meraz	UD	8	Nov 24, 2006	Gimnasio Polifuncional, Hermosillo, Mexico	
9	Win	9–0	Jose Espinoza	MD	8	Oct 20, 2006	Centro de Usos Múltiples, Huatabampo, Mexico	
8	Win	8–0	Vicente Maroquin	TKO	2 (6)	Sep 16, 2006	Gimnasio Polifuncional, Hermosillo, Mexico	
7	Win	7–0	Diego Munoz	TKO	2 (6), 1:11	Aug 5, 2006	Auditorio del Estado, Mexicali, Mexico	
6	Win	6–0	Humberto Arizmendi	UD	4	May 20, 2006	Plaza de los Tres Presidentes, Guaymas, Mexico	
5	Win	5–0	Cruz Molina	TKO	1 (6), 2:19	May 5, 2006	Gimnasio Polifuncional, Hermosillo, Mexico	
4	Win	4–0	Giovanny Sepulveda	KO	1 (6)	Apr 1, 2006	Plaza de los Tres Presidentes, Guaymas, Mexico	
3	Win	3–0	Manuel Pinzon	TKO	2 (4)	Mar 4, 2006	Gimnasio Municipal, Mexicali, Mexico	
2	Win	2–0	Noe Alvarez	KO	2 (4)	Dec 9, 2005	Plaza de los Tres Presidentes, Guaymas, Mexico	
1	Win	1–0	Noe Acosta	UD	4	Oct 21, 2005	Salón Modelorama, Guaymas, Mexico	

Sporting positions
Regional boxing titles
Vacant Title last held by Everth Briceno	WBA FEDEBOL flyweight champion July 13, 2007 – October 2007; Vacated	Vacant Title next held by Jhon Alberto Molina
New title	WBC–USNBC flyweight champion July 25, 2009 – July 2010; Vacated	Vacant Title next held by Daniel Lozano
World boxing titles
Preceded by Luis Concepción	WBA flyweight champion April 2, 2011 – November 17, 2012; Lost bid for Super title	Succeeded by Juan Carlos Reveco promoted from interim status
