= McJoe Arroyo =

Puerto Rican boxer

Personal information
- Born: McJoe Arroyo Acevedo; December 5, 1985 (age 40) Ceiba, Puerto Rico
- Height: 5 ft 4 in (163 cm)
- Weight: Super flyweight

Boxing career
- Reach: 65 in (165 cm)
- Stance: Southpaw

Boxing record
- Total fights: 22
- Wins: 18
- Win by KO: 8
- Losses: 4
Medal record
Men's Boxing
Representing Puerto Rico
World Amateur Championships
Bronze medal – third place	2007 Chicago	Bantamweight
Central American and Caribbean Games
Bronze medal – third place	2006 Cartagena	Flyweight

McJoe Arroyo Acevedo (born December 5, 1985) is a Puerto Rican professional boxer who held the IBF junior bantamweight title from 2015 to 2016. As an amateur, he represented Puerto Rico in international competition, winning a bronze medal at the 2007 World Amateur Boxing Championships in the bantamweight category. His twin brother, McWilliams Arroyo, is also a professional boxer. The brothers are the only pair of twins to win medals at the World Amateur Boxing Championships, and the second twins to qualify for the Olympics in boxing.

== Early life ==
McJoe was born along his twin brother, McWilliams, in the municipality of Ceiba in the northeast coastal region of Puerto Rico's main island. Arroyo and his twin, were introduced to boxing in their childhood. At the age of 12, they entered Gimnasio Fito Ramos, a gymnasium located in the municipality of Fajardo, Puerto Rico. In this locale they met Anthony Otero, a retired amateur boxer, who became their trainer during this stage of their careers. They initially took up the sport as a hobby, but after six fights they began establishing a pattern of only spending a limited amount of time inactive during a month, visiting the gymnasium at least every two weeks. Since the early stages of their careers, the brothers decided to fight in different divisions, in order to avoid fighting against each other. However, they participated in sparring sessions, performing as they would do against other sparring partners.

== Amateur career ==
Arroyo represented Puerto Rico in international competition. He won Bronze at flyweight at 2006 Central American and Caribbean Games. In 2007 he participated at the Amateur World Championships and lost in the semifinals to eventual Russian winner Sergey Vodopyanov 9:20, qualifying for the 2008 Olympic Games. After recovering, Arroyo participated in the XXVIII International Golden Belt Tournament organized in Constanta, Romania. Here he defeated local Alex Spatariu in his first fight, who abandoned the fight in the third round. In the semifinals he defeated Mirzhan Rakhimzanov of Kazajistan on points, with scores of 21-16. In the finals he fought against Veira de Jesús of Brazil, defeating him on points (28-16). As part of their training the boxing team moved to South Korea, in order to assimilate the time changes. After training and participating in a series of exhibition matches, the team traveled from Korea to Beijing.

== Professional career ==
On December 8, 2009, the Arroyo brothers issued a press release through their mother, Milagros Acevedo, informing that they were no longer interested in continuing their amateur careers. In the letter, they report differences with the criteria used to provide economical support to high-performance athletes, as well as schedule conflicts with their original plans to pursue a professional career after the 2010 Central American and Caribbean Games. These concerns were restated in a subsequent press conference, where they noted that supporting their respective families was the main reason to pursue a professional career. On January 12, 2010, PR Best Boxing announced the official signing of both brothers. Arroyo's debut was scheduled for February 27, 2010, where he competed in the bantamweight division as part of a card titled "Haciendo Historia", where Wilfredo Vázquez, Jr. fought Marvin Sonsona for the super bantamweight world championship. His opponent, Giovanni Rivera, had a previous experience of two professional fights. The fight began with Rivera moving around the ring, while Arroyo pursued him while engaging on the offensive, eventually scoring a knockdown. After 25 seconds of the second round had passed, he scored a second knockdown, prompting the referee to stop the contest by technical knockout. In his second fight, Arroyo defeated Steve Cannell by unanimous decision, winning all four rounds. Next he won a consecutive decision over Jairo Delgado.

In his first six-round fight, Arroyo defeated Jason Rorie by technical knockout. On August 28, 2010, he scored a unanimous decision win over Sigfredo Medina. Arroyo then entered the first knockout streak of his career, which began with a first round victory over Israel Rojas. This run was completed by third and first-round technical knockouts over Eduardo Meléndez and Ivan Moxey. However, Arroyo was forced to rest eight months between these two fights after suffering a chin fracture, making his return in the super flyweight division. He then faced Shawn Nichol in consecutive fights, winning both by unanimous decision in six rounds. On September 27, 2012, Arroyo defeated former world champion José López by technical knockout in four rounds. He repeated this performance against Felipe Rivas, winning the World Boxing Organization's Latino championship. Arroyo returned with a unanimous decision wins over Jairo Hernández in eight rounds. He won the next fight in equal fashion, this time against former contender David Quijano. On June 14, 2014, Arroyo scored an eleventh-round technical knockout over former world champion Hernán Márquez in an International Boxing Federation title eliminator. He gathered knockdowns in the first, fourth, eighth and final rounds.

On 18 July 2015, Arroyo fought undefeated Arthur Villanueva for the vacant IBF junior bantamweight title. Arroyo started off strong, but after that the fight had a few twists and turns, each fighter having his moments. Near the end of the sixth round, a clash of heads opened a cut above Villanueva's right eye. As the fight went on, Villanueva fought with urgency as he felt the fight might end early due to his severe cut. The fight was stopped in the tenth round because of the cut, and the contest went to the scorecards. Arroyo edged Villanueva, 98-91, 98-91 and 97-92 on the scorecards.

In his first title defence, Arroyo battled Jerwin Ancajas. Ancajas scored a knockdown over Arroyo in the seventh, as he dominated throughout most of the fight en route to a unanimous decision victory. The scorecards were 118-109, 117-110 and 115-112 in favor of the new champion.

In his next fight, Arroyo fought former world champion Rau'shee Warren. Arroyo boxed well, but Warren was busier and sharper. Warren won on all three judges' scorecards 118-110, 117-111 and 117-111.

On 16 March 2019, Arroyo battled Luis Nery. Arroyo was dropped by Nery once in the second and third round, and twice in the fourth round. After the end of the fourth round, Arroyo's corner informed the referee to stop the fight.

== Professional boxing record ==
22 fights	18 wins	4 losses
By knockout	8	1
By decision	10	3

No.	Result	Record	Opponent	Type	Round, time	Date	Location	Notes
22	Loss	18–4	Sharone Carter	UD	8	23 Jan 2021	Mohegan Sun Arena, Montville, Connecticut, U.S.	
21	Loss	18–3	Luis Nery	RTD	4 (10), 3:00	16 Mar 2019	AT&T Stadium, Arlington, Texas, U.S.	
20	Win	18–2	Sander Diaz	MD	8	2 Jun 2018	Plaza Central, Palmar de Varela, Colombia	
19	Loss	17–2	Rau'shee Warren	UD	12	29 Jul 2017	Barclays Center, Brooklyn, New York, U.S.	
18	Loss	17–1	Jerwin Ancajas	UD	12	3 Sep 2016	Jurado Hall of the Philippine Marine Corp, Taguig, Philippines	Lost IBF junior bantamweight title
17	Win	17–0	Arthur Villanueva	TD	10 (12), 2:05	18 Jul 2015	Don Haskins Center, El Paso, Texas, U.S.	Won vacant IBF junior bantamweight title; Unanimous TD after Villanueva cut
16	Win	16–0	Mark Anthony Geraldo	UD	12	20 Dec 2014	El San Juan Resort and Casino, Carolina, Puerto Rico	
15	Win	15–0	Hernán Márquez	TKO	11 (12), 0:47	14 Jun 2014	Arena Jorge Cuesy Serrano, Tuxtla Gutiérrez, Mexico	
14	Win	14–0	David Quijano	UD	8	28 Apr 2014	Coliseo Rubén Rodríguez, Bayamón, Puerto Rico	
13	Win	13–0	Jairo Ochoa	UD	8	20 Apr 2013	Mexico City Arena, Mexico City, Mexico	
12	Win	12–0	Felipe Rivas	TKO	4 (10), 2:59	2 Feb 2013	Coliseo Rubén Rodríguez, Bayamón, Puerto Rico	Won vacant WBO Latino junior bantamweight title
11	Win	11–0	José López	TKO	4 (10), 2:27	27 Sep 2012	Hotel San Juan, Isla Verde, Puerto Rico	
10	Win	10–0	Shawn Nichol	UD	6	10 Mar 2012	Roberto Clemente Coliseum, San Juan, Puerto Rico	
9	Win	9–0	Shawn Nichol	UD	6	7 Oct 2011	Coliseo Rebekah Colberg Cabrera, Cabo Rojo, Puerto Rico	
8	Win	8–0	Ivan Moxey	TKO	1 (6), 1:35	2 Sep 2011	Coliseo Rubén Rodríguez, Bayamón, Puerto Rico	
7	Win	7–0	Eduardo Melendez	TKO	3 (6), 1:38	22 Jan 2011	Complejo Correccional INST 1072, Bayamón, Puerto Rico	
6	Win	6–0	Israel Rojas	TKO	1 (6), 2:10	16 Oct 2010	Silver Spurs Arena, Kissimmee, Florida, U.S.	
5	Win	5–0	Sigfredo Medina	UD	6	28 Aug 2010	Mario Morales Coliseum, Guaynabo, Puerto Rico	
4	Win	4–0	Jason Rorie	TKO	6 (6), 2:00	10 Jul 2010	José Miguel Agrelot Coliseum, San Juan, Puerto Rico	
3	Win	3–0	Jairo Delgado	UD	4	29 May 2010	Coliseo Rubén Rodríguez, Bayamón, Puerto Rico	
2	Win	2–0	Steve Cannell	UD	4	17 Apr 2010	Coliseo Tomas Dones, Fajardo, Puerto Rico	
1	Win	1–0	Giovanny Rivera	TKO	2 (4), 0:25	27 Feb 2010	Coliseo Rubén Rodríguez, Bayamón, Puerto Rico	

== See also ==
- List of southpaw stance boxers
- Notable boxing families
- Boxing in Puerto Rico
- List of Puerto Rican boxing world champions
- List of world super-flyweight boxing champions

Sporting positions
Regional boxing titles
Vacant Title last held by David Quijano	WBO Latino super-flyweight champion February 2, 2013 – 2013; Vacated	Vacant Title next held by Matthew Villanueva
World boxing titles
Vacant Title last held by Zolani Tete	IBF super-flyweight champion July 18, 2015 – September 3, 2016	Succeeded by Jerwin Ancajas
