= Luis Concepción =

Panamanian boxer

Personal information
- Nickname: El Nica
- Born: Luis Miguel Concepcion Montiel; October 6, 1985 (age 41) Panama City, Panama
- Height: 5 ft 2 in (157 cm)
- Weight: Flyweight; Super flyweight

Boxing career
- Reach: 63 in (160 cm)
- Stance: Orthodox

Boxing record
- Total fights: 52
- Wins: 40
- Win by KO: 29
- Losses: 12

Luis Miguel Concepción Montiel (born October 6, 1985) is a Panamanian professional boxer. He is a world champion in two weight classes, having held the World Boxing Association (WBA) flyweight title in 2011 and the WBA super flyweight title in 2016.

== Professional career ==
His nickname is "El Nica", the southpaw resides in the capital of Panama. His professional record includes 24 fights: 22 wins (17 knockouts), and 2 losses. He won the WBA Interim Flyweight Title by TKO against Mexican Omar Salado on September 5, 2009. He was promoted to full WBA Champion after reigning Champion Daiki Kameda relinquished his title in 2011. He lost the WBA Flyweight Title to Hernan Márquez by TKO in the 11th round.

Concepcion was slated to defend his WBA super flyweight title against Kal Yafai on 10 December 2016. Concepcion failed to make weight for the fight twice, leading to the WBA stripping him of the title a day before the fight. The title was vacant and only Yafai was eligible to win it with an eventual win. Yafai managed to secure the win with a boxing masterclass, winning on all three scorecards.

In his next fight, he knocked out Luis de la Rosa in the second round to secure the win.

Next, Concepcion was scheduled to fight Iran Diaz. Despite being the underdog, Diaz got a shocking unanimous decision win against Concepcion.

In a bid to get his career back on track, Concepcion fought Colombian Luis Carrillo in his homecountry of Panama, on 24 October 2017. Concepcion managed to secure the much needed win via a second-round knockout.

Next, Concepcion fought unbeaten super flyweight Andrew Moloney. Concepcion lost the fight in the tenth round via TKO. Moloney was dominant from the opening bell, with Concepcion having some success in the latter rounds, but not nearly enough to make a difference in the fight.

One of his trainers was María Toto.

== Professional boxing record ==
52 fights	40 wins	12 losses
By knockout	29	6
By decision	11	6

No.	Result	Record	Opponent	Type	Round, time	Date	Location	Notes
52	Loss	40–12	Kenneth Llover	TKO	8 (10), 2:27	17 Aug 2025	Winford Resort and Casino, Manila, Philippines	
51	Loss	40–11	David Cuellar Contreras	TKO	8 (10), 0:45	13 Oct 2023	Polifórum Benito Juárez, Cancún, Mexico	
50	Loss	40–10	Hernán Márquez	SD	10	7 Oct 2022	Centro de Usos Múltiples, Hermosillo, Mexico	
49	Win	40–9	Juan Lopez	TKO	9 (10), 1:50	17 Jun 2022	Coliseo de Combates, Panama City, Panama	
48	Loss	39–9	Artem Dalakian	TKO	9 (12), 0:41	20 Nov 2021	AKKO International, Kyiv, Ukraine	For WBA flyweight title
47	Win	39–8	Rober Barrera	TKO	11 (12)	7 Feb 2020	Roberto Durán Arena, Panama City, Panama	Won WBA interim flyweight title
46	Win	38–8	Felix Moncada	KO	4 (8)	19 Jul 2019	Gimnasio Los Naranjos, Boquete, Panama	
45	Loss	37–8	Alexandru Marin	UD	10	11 May 2019	EagleBank Arena, Fairfax, Virginia, U.S.	
44	Loss	37–7	Andrew Moloney	TKO	10 (10)	8 Sep 2018	Bendigo Stadium, Bendigo, Australia	For WBA Oceania super flyweight title
43	Win	37–6	Luis Carrillo	KO	2 (8)	4 Oct 2017	Fantastic Casino de Albrook Mall, Panama City, Panama	
42	Loss	36–6	Iran Diaz	UD	10	2 Sep 2017	Arena Itson, Ciudad Obregón, Mexico	
41	Win	36–5	Luis de la Rosa	KO	2 (8)	5 Jul 2017	Fantastic Casino de Albrook Mall, Panama City, Panama	
40	Loss	35–5	Kal Yafai	UD	12	10 Dec 2016	Manchester Arena, Manchester, England	
39	Win	35–4	Kohei Kono	UD	12	31 Aug 2016	Ota City General Gymnasium, Ōta, Japan	Won WBA super flyweight title
38	Win	34–4	Hernán Márquez	UD	12	17 Dec 2015	Roberto Durán Arena, Panama City, Panama	Retained WBA interim super flyweight title
37	Win	33–4	David Sánchez	RTD	10 (12)	19 Sep 2015	Centro de Usos Múltiples, Hermosillo, Mexico	Won WBA interim super flyweight title
36	Loss	32–4	Carlos Cuadras	UD	12	4 May 2015	Unidad Deportiva Martín Alarcón, Metepec, Mexico	For WBC super flyweight title
35	Win	32–3	Duvan Hernández	TKO	7 (12)	23 Aug 2014	Roberto Durán Arena, Panama City, Panama	
34	Win	31–3	Carlos Fontes	TD	9 (12)	20 Feb 2014	Centro de Convenciones Figali, Panama City, Panama	
33	Win	30–3	Carlos Ruben Dario Ruiz	KO	10 (12)	19 Oct 2013	Roberto Durán Arena, Panama City, Panama	
32	Win	29–3	Nestor Daniel Narvaes	UD	12	3 Aug 2013	Roberto Durán Arena, Panama City, Panama	
31	Win	28–3	Anuar Salas	TKO	6 (12)	20 Apr 2013	Roberto Durán Arena, Panama City, Panama	
30	Win	27–3	Pablo Carrillo	UD	10	22 Nov 2012	Roberto Durán Arena, Panama City, Panama	
29	Win	26–3	Pablo Carrillo	UD	8	1 Sep 2012	Roberto Durán Arena, Panama City, Panama	
28	Win	25–3	Odilon Zaleta	TKO	2 (10)	24 May 2012	Roberto Durán Arena, Panama City, Panama	
27	Win	24–3	Oscar Gallardo	KO	1 (12)	15 Mar 2012	Roberto Durán Arena, Panama City, Panama	
26	Loss	23–3	Hernán Márquez	TKO	1 (12)	29 Oct 2011	Centro de Usos Múltiples, Hermosillo, Mexico	For WBA flyweight title
25	Win	23–2	Manuel Vargas	KO	1 (10)	11 Aug 2011	Roberto Durán Arena, Panama City, Panama	
24	Loss	22–2	Hernán Márquez	TKO	11 (12)	2 Apr 2011	Roberto Durán Arena, Panama City, Panama	Lost WBA flyweight title
23	Win	22–1	Denkaosan Kaovichit	TKO	1 (12)	2 Oct 2010	Roberto Durán Arena, Panama City, Panama	Retained WBA interim flyweight title
22	Win	21–1	Wilfrido Váldez	KO	1 (8)	14 Aug 2010	Roberto Durán Arena, Panama City, Panama	
21	Win	20–1	Eric Ortiz	TKO	4 (12)	22 Apr 2010	Roberto Durán Arena, Panama City, Panama	Retained WBA interim flyweight title
20	Win	19–1	Roberto Carlos Leyva	KO	4 (12)	27 Nov 2009	Roberto Durán Arena, Panama City, Panama	Retained WBA interim flyweight title
19	Win	18–1	Omar Salado	TKO	12 (12)	5 Sep 2009	Roberto Durán Arena, Panama City, Panama	Won WBA interim flyweight title
18	Win	17–1	Ernesto Castro	TKO	1 (8)	30 Apr 2009	Roberto Durán Arena, Panama City, Panama	
17	Win	16–1	Santiago Ivan Acosta	UD	11	19 Feb 2009	Centro de Convenciones Atlapa, Panama City, Panama	
16	Win	15–1	Noel Arambulet	KO	1 (10)	28 Nov 2008	Centro de Convenciones Atlapa, Panama City, Panama	
15	Win	14–1	Juan Esquer	TKO	5 (11)	19 Aug 2008	Centro de Convenciones Atlapa, Panama City, Panama	
14	Win	13–1	William De Sousa	UD	9	2 Jul 2008	Centro de Convenciones Atlapa, Panama City, Panama	
13	Win	12–1	Luis Singo	KO	5 (9)	7 May 2008	Centro de Convenciones Atlapa, Panama City, Panama	
12	Win	11–1	Freddy Canate	TKO	1 (8)	27 Mar 2008	Centro de Convenciones Atlapa, Panama City, Panama	
11	Win	10–1	Emerson Nisperusa	KO	1 (8)	1 Dec 2007	Gimnasio Roberto Duran, Panama City, Panama	
10	Win	9–1	Humberto Obando	TKO	3 (6)	16 Aug 2007	Centro de Convenciones Figali, Panama City, Panama	
9	Win	8–1	Anduar Vargas	KO	2 (4)	13 Jul 2007	Domo de la Universidad de Panama, Panama City, Panama	
8	Win	7–1	John Jimenez	KO	1 (4)	22 Jun 2007	Domo de la Universidad de Panama, Panama City, Panama	
7	Win	6–1	Ezequiel Asprilla	UD	4	1 Jun 2007	Domo de la Universidad de Panama, Panama City, Panama	
6	Win	5–1	Javier Cordoba	KO	4 (8)	10 Mar 2007	Hotel Melia, Colón, Panama	
5	Win	4–1	Ezequiel Asprilla	UD	4	17 Nov 2006	Gimnasio 24 de Diciembre, Panama City, Panama	
4	Loss	3–1	Gilmer Baules	UD	4	30 Sep 2006	Gimnasio Escolar, David, Panama	
3	Win	3–0	Daniel Deago	UD	4	15 Jul 2006	Gimnasio Municipal, Antón, Panama	
2	Win	2–0	Javier Carpintero	TKO	3 (4)	17 Jun 2006	Gimnasio Escolar, David, Panama	
1	Win	1–0	Alexander Murillo	TKO	2 (4)	21 Mar 2006	Centro de Convenciones Atlapa, Panama City, Panama	

== Titles in boxing ==
=== Major world titles ===
- WBA flyweight champion (112 lbs)
- WBA super flyweight champion (115 lbs)

=== Interim world titles ===
- WBA interim flyweight champion (112 lbs) (2x)
- WBA interim super flyweight champion (115 lbs)

== See also ==
- List of flyweight boxing champions
- List of super-flyweight boxing champions
- List of Panamanians

Sporting positions
World boxing titles
Vacant Title last held by Roberto Vásquez	WBA flyweight champion Interim title September 5, 2009 - January 4, 2011; Promoted	Vacant Title next held by Jean Piero Pérez
Preceded by Daiki Kameda	WBA flyweight champion January 4, 2011 - April 2, 2011	Succeeded by Hernán Márquez
Preceded by David Sánchez	WBA super flyweight champion Interim title September 29, 2015 - August 31, 2016; Won full title	Vacant
Preceded by Kohei Kono	WBA super flyweight champion August 31, 2016 - December 9, 2016; Stripped	Vacant Title next held by Khalid Yafai
Vacant Title last held by Stamp Kiatniwat	WBA flyweight champion Interim title February 7, 2020 - August 25, 2021; Stripped	Title discontinued
