= Julio César Miranda =

Mexican boxer (born 1980)

Personal information
- Nickname: Pingo
- Born: May 19, 1980 (age 46) Veracruz, Mexico
- Height: 5 ft 3 in (160 cm)
- Weight: Flyweight; Bantamweight

Boxing career
- Reach: 64 in (163 cm)
- Stance: Orthodox

Boxing record
- Total fights: 58
- Wins: 42
- Win by KO: 32
- Losses: 14
- Draws: 2

Julio César Miranda (born May 19, 1980), is a Mexican professional boxer and the former WBO Flyweight champion.

== Professional career ==
Miranda began his professional career on August 19, 2000, with a unanimous decision win over Antonio Garibay. He won the vacant WBO flyweight title by defeating Richie Mepranum on June 12, 2010, by a 5th-round TKO. He would lose the title in his fourth defense against Brian Viloria.

== Professional boxing record ==
58 fights	42 wins	14 losses
By knockout	32	3
By decision	10	11
Draws	2	

No.	Result	Record	Opponent	Type	Round, time	Date	Location	Notes
58	Loss	42–14–2	Ricardo Roman	SD	12 (12)	2017-10-24	Arena El Jefe, Monterrey, Mexico	
57	Win	42–13–2	Gustavo Molina	RTD	4 (12)	2017-07-11	Arena El Jefe, Monterrey, Mexico	
56	Win	41–13–2	Jose Alfredo Zuniga	TKO	6 (12)	2017-04-04	Arena El Jefe, Monterrey, Mexico	
55	Loss	40–13–2	Nordine Oubaali	TKO	12 (12)	2016-12-17	Gymnase du Clos de l'Arche, Noisy-le-Grand, France	For WBA Inter-Continental bantamweight title
54	Win	40–12–2	Jesus Guadalupe Romero	TKO	9 (12)	2016-09-27	Arena El Jefe, Monterrey, Mexico	
53	Win	39–12–2	Enrique Silva	UD	12 (12)	2016-04-26	Arena El Jefe, Monterrey, Mexico	
52	Loss	38–12–2	Arthur Villanueva	UD	10 (10)	2015-02-07	Uni. of Southeastern Philippines, Davao City, Philippines	
51	Win	38–11–2	Fernando Aguilar	MD	12 (12)	2014-11-14	Arena El Jefe, Monterrey, Mexico	Won vacant Mexican bantamweight title
50	Loss	37–11–2	Arturo Santos Reyes	SD	10 (10)	2014-03-29	Arena Monterrey, Monterrey, Mexico	
49	Loss	37–10–2	Hugo Cázares	UD	12 (12)	2013-12-07	Hotel Ixtapa Azul, Zihuatanejo, Mexico	For WBC International Silver super-bantamweight title
48	Loss	37–9–2	Hugo Ruiz	MD	12 (12)	2013-09-07	Casino, Apodaca, Mexico	For WBC Continental Americas bantamweight title
47	Draw	37–8–2	Juan José Montes	MD	12 (12)	2013-04-13	Monumental Plaza de Toros, Ciudad Hidalgo, Mexico	For WBC Continental Americas bantamweight title
46	Loss	35–8–1	Felipe Orucuta	TKO	10 (10)	2012-09-08	Deportivo del Sindicato Metro, Mexico City, Mexico	
45	Loss	35–7–1	Rodel Mayol	UD	10 (10)	2012-05-13	Ynares Sports Arena, Pasig City, Philippines	
44	Win	37–6–1	Cecilio Santos	UD	10 (10)	2011-12-17	Arena Jorge Cuesy Serrano, Tuxtla Gutierrez, Mexico	
43	Win	36–6–1	Luis Carlos Leon	RTD	3 (10)	2011-09-15	Auditorio Ernesto Rufo, Rosarito, Mexico	
42	Loss	35–6–1	Brian Viloria	UD	12 (12)	2011-07-16	Neal S. Blaisdell Center, Honolulu, Hawaii, U.S.	Lost WBO flyweight title
41	Win	35–5–1	Ardin Diale	TKO	4 (12)	2011-02-26	Explanada Estadio Corregidora, Queretaro, Mexico	Retained WBO flyweight title
40	Win	34–5–1	Michael Arango	TKO	2 (12)	2010-10-16	Estadio de Beisbol, Monterrey, Mexico	Retained WBO flyweight title
39	Win	33–5–1	Ronald Ramos	RTD	8 (12)	2010-09-04	Arena Solidaridad, Monterrey, Mexico	Retained WBO flyweight title
38	Win	32–5–1	Richie Mepranum	TKO	5 (12)	2010-06-12	Centro de Convenciones, Puebla, Mexico	Won vacant WBO flyweight title
37	Win	31–5–1	Faustino Cupul	TKO	3 (12)	2010-04-10	Palenque de la Feria, Victoria de Durango, Mexico	Won vacant IBF Latino flyweight title
36	Loss	30–5–1	Moruti Mthalane	UD	12 (12)	2009-11-20	Wembley Indoor Arena, Johannesburg, South Africa	For vacant IBF flyweight title
35	Win	30–4–1	Eric Ortiz	KO	1 (12)	2009-07-11	Palenque de Gallos, Tuxtla Gutierrez, Mexico	
34	Loss	29–4–1	Pongsaklek Wonjongkam	UD	12 (12)	2009-04-24	Chachoengsao, Thailand	For Interim WBC flyweight title
33	Win	29–3–1	Arturo Estrada	KO	1 (10)	2008-12-09	Arena El Jefe, Monterrey, Mexico	
32	Win	28–3–1	Eduardo Garcia	TKO	7 (10)	2008-10-24	Arena Coliseo, Monterrey, Mexico	
31	Win	27–3–1	Julio Grimaldo	RTD	6 (10)	2008-07-25	Arena El Jefe, Monterrey, Mexico	
30	Win	26–3–1	Omar Salado	TKO	5 (12)	2008-05-17	Auditorio Centenario, Gomez Palacio, Mexico	
29	Win	25–3–1	Giovanny Urbina	KO	1 (10)	2008-02-15	Pueblo Viejo, Mexico	
28	Win	24–3–1	Salvador Montes	KO	3 (10)	2007-12-14	Arena El Jefe, Monterrey, Mexico	
27	Win	23–3–1	Branni Guerrero	TKO	4 (10)	2007-10-12	Arena El Jefe, Monterrey, Mexico	
26	Win	22–3–1	Miller Valencia	KO	3 (10)	2007-08-31	Arena El Jefe, Monterrey, Mexico	
25	Win	21–3–1	Christian Gomez	KO	2 (10)	2007-07-20	Arena El Jefe, Monterrey, Mexico	
24	Win	20–3–1	Alfonso Lugo	KO	6 (10)	2007-05-26	Auditorio Municipal, Tampico, Mexico	
23	Win	19–3–1	Francisco Marquez	UD	10 (10)	2007-03-30	Arena Montepio, Montepio, Mexico	
22	Win	18–3–1	Valentin Leon	TKO	10 (10)	2007-02-23	Cinema Regio, Monterrey, Mexico	
21	Win	17–3–1	Christian Gomez	KO	2 (10)	2006-09-30	Arena Coliseo, Monterrey, Mexico	
20	Win	16–3–1	Job Solano	UD	10 (10)	2006-08-18	Arena Coliseo, Monterrey, Mexico	
19	Win	15–3–1	Roberto Carlos Leyva	TKO	7 (10)	2006-06-22	Gimnasio Oscar 'Tigre' García, Ensenada, Mexico	
18	Win	14–3–1	Victor Santos	TKO	9 (10)	2006-06-02	Arena Coliseo, Monterrey, Mexico	
17	Win	13–3–1	Miller Valencia	KO	9 (10)	2005-12-15	Monterrey, Mexico	
16	Win	12–3–1	Lauro Lopez	TKO	7 (10)	2005-08-19	Arena Coliseo, Monterrey, Mexico	
15	Win	11–3–1	David Torres	TKO	1 (10)	2005-07-16	Monterrey, Mexico	
14	Win	10–3–1	Efrain Campiran	TKO	7 (10)	2005-06-17	Arena Coliseo, Monterrey, Mexico	
13	Win	9–3–1	Jose Ortiz	PTS	10 (10)	2005-02-18	Arena Coliseo, Monterrey, Mexico	
12	Loss	8–3–1	Sammy Gutiérrez	UD	10 (10)	2004-12-17	Arena Coliseo, Monterrey, Mexico	
11	Win	8–2–1	Salvador Rosales	TKO	3 (10)	2004-05-28	Arena Coliseo, Monterrey, Mexico	
10	Win	7–2–1	Jose Antonio Gonzalez	TKO	2 (4)	2004-04-16	Arena Coliseo, Monterrey, Mexico	
9	Win	6–2–1	Francisco Bernal	TKO	2 (10)	2004-04-02	Arena Coliseo, Monterrey, Mexico	
8	Loss	5–2–1	Alberto Ontiveros	TKO	3 (10)	2003-12-19	Arena Coliseo, Monterrey, Mexico	
7	Draw	5–1–1	Regulo Gamez	PTS	4 (4)	2003-05-03	Pueblo Viejo, Mexico	
6	Win	5–1	Regulo Gamez	UD	6 (6)	2003-02-21	Arena Coliseo, Reynosa, Mexico	
5	Win	4–1	Jair Macias	KO	1 (4)	2002-08-30	Arena Coliseo, Reynosa, Mexico	
4	Win	3–1	Andres Lara	PTS	6 (6)	2002-05-17	Reynosa, Mexico	
3	Loss	2–1	Pollito Davila	PTS	4 (4)	2001-05-18	Tampico, Mexico	
2	Win	2–0	Hermilio Martinez	UD	4 (4)	2001-03-23	Ciudad Mante, Mexico	
1	Win	1–0	Antonio Garibay	PTS	4 (4)	2000-08-19	Anahuac, Mexico	

== See also ==
- List of Mexican boxing world champions
- List of world flyweight boxing champions

Sporting positions
Regional boxing titles
New title	IBF Latino flyweight champion April 10, 2010 – 2011; Vacated	Vacant Title next held by Juan Carlos Reveco
Vacant Title last held by Alejandro Hernández	Mexican bantamweight champion November 14, 2014 – 2015; Vacated	Vacant Title next held by Enrique Silva Martinez
World boxing titles
Vacant Title last held by Omar Narváez	WBO flyweight champion June 12, 2010 – July 16, 2011	Succeeded by Brian Viloria
