= Felipe Orucuta =

Mexican boxer

Personal information
- Nickname: Gallito
- Born: Felipe Guadalupe Orucuta Ramirez; 13 October 1985 (age 41) Ciudad López Mateos, State of Mexico, Mexico
- Height: 1.75 m (5 ft 9 in)
- Weight: Super flyweight

Boxing career
- Reach: 181 cm (71 in)
- Stance: Orthodox

Boxing record
- Total fights: 42
- Wins: 36
- Win by KO: 30
- Losses: 6
- Draws: 0
- No contests: 0

Felipe Guadalupe Orucuta Ramirez (born 13 October 1985) is a Mexican professional boxer and is the former WBC FECARBOX bantamweight Champion.

== Professional career ==
In March 2008, Orucuta beat veteran Jorge Romero by T.K.O. to win the WBC FECARBOX bantamweight title. The bout was the main-event of a boxing card at the Arena Adolfo López Mateos in Tlalnepantla, México, Mexico.

In 2019, after a fight against Jonathan 'Titan' Rodriguez, he fell into a coma. After successful emergency surgery performed to remove a blood clot from his brain he was placed in a medically induced coma. He eventually recuperated.

== Professional boxing record ==
36 Wins (30 Knockouts, 6 Decisions), 5 Losses, 0 Draws
| Res. | Record | Opponent | Type | Round | Date | Location | Notes |
| Loss | 36-5 | (Mexico) Juan Francisco Estrada | UD | 12 | 2018-09-08 | (United States) The Forum, Inglewood, California, U.S. | |
| Win | 36-4 | (Mexico) Ricardo Roman | TKO | 4 (8) | 2018-05-26 | Mexico City, Mexico | |
| Win | 35-4 | (Mexico) Edgar Jimenez | TKO | 5 (8) | 2017-09-30 | Ecatepec, Mexico | |
| Win | 34-4 | (Mexico) Juan Jimenez | TKO | 5 (8) | 2017-04-22 | Metepec, Mexico | |
| Win | 33-4 | (Mexico) Efrain Pérez | TKO | 3 (8) | 2016-11-05 | Polideportivo Centenario, Los Mochis, Mexico | |
| Win | 32-4 | (Nicaragua) Yader Cardoza | TKO | 4 (10) | 2016-09-03 | Deportivo Zaragoza, Ciudad López Mateos, Mexico | |
| Loss | 31-4 | (Mexico) José Cayetano | TD | 6 (10) | 2015-12-05 | Gimnasio Municipal, Tecate, Mexico | |
| Win | 31-3 | (Mexico) Roberto Pucheta Amador | UD | 10 | 2015-08-08 | Tecate, Mexico | |
| Win | 30-3 | (Mexico) Ricardo Roman | TKO | 7 (10) | 2015-04-25 | Auditorio Municipal, Tijuana, Mexico | |
| Loss | 29-3 | (Argentina) Omar Andres Narvaez | MD | 12 | 2014-09-19 | Anfiteatro Municipal, Córdoba, Argentina | For WBO super flyweight title |
| Win | 29-2 | (Mexico) Gabriel Pena | TKO | 10 (10) | 2014-01-18 | Gimnasio del Estado, Hermosillo, Mexico | |
| Win | 28-2 | (Mexico) Javier Gallo | TD | 5 (10) | 2013-10-05 | Hipódromo Caliente, Tijuana, Mexico | |
| Loss | 27-2 | (Argentina) Omar Andres Narvaez | SD | 12 | 2013-05-25 | Luna Park, Buenos Aires, Argentina | For WBO super flyweight title |
| Win | 27-1 | (Philippines) Fernando Lumacad | KO | 1 (10) | 2013-01-26 | Auditorio del Bicentenario, Morelia, Mexico | |
| Win | 26-1 | (Colombia) Manuel de los Reyes Herrera | KO | 1 (10) | 2012-11-24 | Foro Polanco, Mexico City, Mexico | Won vacant WBC Continental Americas super flyweight title |
| Win | 25-1 | (Mexico) Julio César Miranda | TKO | 10 (10) | 2012-09-08 | Sindicato del Metro, Mexico City, Mexico | |
| Win | 24-1 | (Philippines) Richard Garcia | TKO | 2 (10) | 2012-06-30 | Palenque de la Feria, Aguascalientes, Mexico | |
| Win | 23-1 | (Mexico) Roberto Castaneda | TKO | 5 (10) | 2012-01-14 | Auditorio Municipal, Tijuana, Mexico | |
| Win | 22-1 | (Colombia) Devis Pérez | KO | 5 (10) | 2011-09-15 | Auditorio Ernesto Rufo, Rosarito, Mexico | |
| Win | 21-1 | (Mexico) Jesús Vázquez | TKO | 2 (10) | 2011-07-30 | Metropolitan Arena, Tuxtla Gutiérrez, Mexico | |
| Win | 20-1 | (Argentina) Julio David Roque Ler | KO | 3 (10) | 2011-05-21 | Metropolitan Arena, Tuxtla Gutiérrez, Mexico | |
| Win | 19-1 | (Mexico) José Tamayo | TKO | 2 (8) | 2011-03-05 | El Palenque de la Feria, Tepic, Mexico | |
| Loss | 18-1 | (Mexico) Daniel Rosas | UD | 10 | 2010-12-16 | Mexico City, Mexico | Campeón Azteca Tecate Final |
| Win | 18-0 | (Mexico) Enrique Bernache | TKO | 1 (8) | 2010-11-17 | Feria de Xmatkuil, Mérida, Mexico | Campeón Azteca tourney |
| Win | 17-0 | (Mexico) Adan Osuna | UD | 6 | 2010-09-06 | Restaurante Arroyo, Mexico City, Mexico | |
| Win | 16-0 | (Mexico) David Solano | TKO | 3 (6) | 2010-03-27 | Ensenada, Mexico | |
| Win | 15-0 | (Mexico) Antonio Chabet | TKO | 2 (6) | 2009-10-24 | World Trade Center, Boca del Río, Mexico | |
| Win | 14-0 | (Mexico) Fernando Vargas | SD | 6 | 2009-06-20 | Ensenada, Mexico | |
| Win | 13-0 | (Mexico) Saúl Nava | RTD | 4 (6) | 2009-05-23 | Apatzingán, Mexico | |
| Win | 12-0 | (Mexico) Álvaro Muro | UD | 6 | 2008-07-25 | (United States) Omega Products International, Corona, California, U.S. | |
| Win | 11-0 | (Mexico) Jorge Romero | KO | 3 (12) | 2008-03-28 | Tlalnepantla de Baz, Mexico | Won vacant WBC Caribe bantamweight title |
| Win | 10-0 | (Mexico) Adolfo Arrellano | TKO | 3 (10) | 2007-10-27 | Ixtapa, Mexico | |
| Win | 9-0 | (Guatemala) Eduardo Avaca | TKO | 2 (6) | 2007-08-31 | Tlalnepantla de Baz, Mexico | |
| Win | 8-0 | (Mexico) Levi Pérez | RTD | 1 (6) | 2007-07-21 | Ciudad Altamirano, Guerrero, Mexico | |
| Win | 7-0 | (Mexico) Rutilo Jimenez | TKO | 3 (6) | 2007-07-13 | Gómez Palacio, Mexico | |
| Win | 6-0 | (Mexico) Mauricio Cervantes | KO | 2 (6) | 2007-05-19 | Ciudad Altamirano, Mexico | |
| Win | 5-0 | (Mexico) Gabriel López | TKO | 4 (4) | 2007-04-27 | Tlalnepantla de Baz, Mexico | |
| Win | 4-0 | (Mexico) Gabriel López | UD | 4 | 2007-02-23 | Tlalnepantla de Baz, Mexico | |
| Win | 3-0 | (Mexico) Ricardo Ocadiz | KO | 1 (4) | 2007-02-03 | San José Iturbide, Mexico | |
| Win | 2-0 | (Mexico) Luis Eduardo Pérez | TKO | 1 (4) | 2006-11-04 | Ciudad Nicolás Romero, Mexico | |
| Win | 1-0 | (Mexico) Christian Hernández | KO | 3 (4) | 2006-09-30 | San José Iturbide, Mexico | |
