= Ludumo Lamati =

South African boxer (born 1992)

Personal information
- Nickname: 9mm
- Nationality: South African
- Born: 19 May 1992 (age 34) Mdantsane, South Africa
- Height: 1.73 m (5 ft 8 in)
- Weight: Super bantamweight

Boxing career
- Reach: 176 cm (69 in)
- Stance: Orthodox

Boxing record
- Total fights: 23
- Wins: 21
- Win by KO: 11
- Losses: 1
- Draws: 1

Ludumo Lamati (born 19 May 1992) is a South African professional boxer. He held the IBO super bantamweight title from June 2021 to May 2022. As an amateur, he competed at the 2011 World Championships.

He was nicknamed 9mm after a semiautomatic pistol by his former trainer, Nick Durandt.

== Amateur career ==
Lamati was involved in many fights as a schoolboy, which led a friend of his to bring him to a boxing gym to introduce him to the sport. He received a scholarship to train at the gym when he was 13. Lamati had over 100 amateur bouts, losing just ten of them. He competed at the 2011 World Championships, where he lost his first fight against Francisco Torrijos of Spain, as well as the 2011 All-Africa Games.

== Professional career ==
Lamati made his professional debut on 10 April 2014, defeating Bongani Bhuti on points in Johannesburg. After compiling a 9–0–1 record, he outpointed Innocent Mantengu in December 2016 for the vacant African super bantamweight title. In his next fight, Lamati upset veteran Bongani Mahlangu for the South African super bantamweight title. He defeated former world title challenger Luis Meléndez three months later to capture the vacant IBF Inter-Continental super bantamweight title, and successfully defended it against Alexis Boureima Kabore that December. In July 2018 Lamati signed a promotional deal with Southampton-based Siesta Boxing Promotions (SBP). He only fought once in England during his stint there, however, beating late replacement Brayan Mairena on a SBP-promoted card in Bracknell on Saint Patrick's Day 2019. He made his return to South Africa on 28 July 2019, headlining a Rumble Africa Promotions event against Richie Mepranum for the vacant IBF Inter-Continental super bantamweight title. Lamati outboxed the southpaw veteran, forcing a corner retirement before the start of the 11th round to claim the IBF Inter-Continental belt for the second time.

Although he didn't fight in 2020, Lamati reached as high as number four in the WBC divisional rankings. He signed with South African promoter Rodney Berman of Golden Gloves Boxing in January 2021. On 19 June 2021, Lamati defeated José Martín Estrada García by majority decision in Kempton Park to claim the vacant IBO super bantamweight title, with the judge's scorecards reading 116–112, 115–113, 114–114.

Lamati faced Haidari Mchanjo on 22 May 2022, following a near year-long absence from the sport. He won the fight by unanimous decision, with two scorecards of 100–90 and one scorecard of 97–92. Lamati next faced Ken Jordan on 2 October 2022. He won the fight by unanimous decision, with scores of 98–93, 98–92 and 98–92. As he struggled to make the bantamweight limit against Jordan, Lamati moved up to super bantamweight for his next bout, against Mark Anthony Geraldo on 17 November 2022. He won the fight by a fourth-round knockout.

== Professional boxing record ==
| 23 fights | 21 wins | 1 loss |
|---|---|---|
| By knockout | 11 | 1 |
| By decision | 10 | 0 |
| Draws | 1 | |

| No. | Result | Record | Opponent | Type | Round, time | Date | Location | Notes |
|---|---|---|---|---|---|---|---|---|
| 23 | Loss | 21–1–1 | Nick Ball | TKO | 12 (12), 2:15 | 27 May 2023 | SSE Arena, Belfast, Northern Ireland | For WBC Silver featherweight title |
| 22 | Win | 21–0–1 | Mark Anthony Geraldo | KO | 4 (10), 2:09 | 17 Nov 2022 | Durban Casino, Durban, South Africa | |
| 21 | Win | 20–0–1 | Ken Jordan | UD | 10 | 2 Oct 2022 | Booysens Boxing Club, Johannesburg, South Africa | |
| 20 | Win | 19–0–1 | Haidari Mchanjo | UD | 10 | 22 May 2022 | Booysens Boxing Club, Johannesburg, South Africa | |
| 19 | Win | 18–0–1 | José Martín Estrada García | MD | 12 | 19 Jun 2021 | Emperors Palace, Kempton Park, South Africa | Won vacant IBO super bantamweight title |
| 18 | Win | 17–0–1 | Said Chino | UD | 8 | 14 Mar 2021 | Emperors Palace, Kempton Park, South Africa | |
| 18 | Win | 16–0–1 | Richie Mepranum | RTD | 10 (12), 3:00 | 28 Jul 2019 | Orient Theatre, East London, South Africa | Won vacant IBF Inter-Continental super bantamweight title |
| 16 | Win | 15–0–1 | Brayan Mairena | PTS | 8 | 17 Mar 2019 | Leisure Centre, Bracknell, England | |
| 15 | Win | 14–0–1 | Said Chino | TKO | 6 (10) | 30 Jun 2018 | Turfontein Race Course, Johannesburg, South Africa | |
| 14 | Win | 13–0–1 | Alexis Boureima Kabore | UD | 12 | 8 Dec 2017 | Orient Theatre, East London, South Africa | Retained IBF Inter-Continental super bantamweight title |
| 13 | Win | 12–0–1 | Luis Meléndez | UD | 12 | 28 Jul 2017 | International Convention Centre, East London, South Africa | Won vacant IBF Inter-Continental super bantamweight title |
| 12 | Win | 11–0–1 | Bongani Mahlangu | PTS | 12 | 30 Apr 2017 | Orient Theatre, East London, South Africa | Won South African super bantamweight title |
| 11 | Win | 10–0–1 | Innocent Mantengu | PTS | 10 | 9 Dec 2016 | Mdantsane Indoor Centre, Mdantsane, South Africa | Won vacant African super bantamweight title |
| 10 | Win | 9–0–1 | Lemogang Mapitsi | KO | 1 (8) | 25 Sep 2016 | Mdantsane Indoor Centre, Mdantsane, South Africa | |
| 9 | Win | 8–0–1 | Luthando Mbumbulwana | TKO | 2 (6) | 23 Apr 2016 | Mdantsane Indoor Centre, Mdantsane, South Africa | |
| 8 | Win | 7–0–1 | Zola Charlie | TKO | 2 (8) | 16 Oct 2015 | Orient Theatre, East London, South Africa | |
| 7 | Draw | 6–0–1 | Cebo Ngema | PTS | 6 | 30 Jul 2015 | Emperors Palace, Kempton Park, South Africa | |
| 6 | Win | 6–0 | Bulelani Nama | TKO | 2 (?) | 15 Dec 2014 | Orient Theatre, East London, South Africa | |
| 5 | Win | 5–0 | Smangaliso Madonsela | TKO | 3 (6) | 27 Nov 2014 | Presleys Restaurant, Boksburg, South Africa | |
| 4 | Win | 4–0 | Noah Nthai | TKO | 4 (4) | 26 Oct 2014 | International Convention Centre, Durban, South Africa | |
| 3 | Win | 3–0 | Mzwandile Nontyawe | KO | 3 (4) | 21 Aug 2014 | Johannesburg, South Africa | |
| 2 | Win | 2–0 | Ephraim Chauke | TKO | 1 (4) | 26 Jun 2014 | Presleys Restaurant, Boksburg, South Africa | |
| 1 | Win | 1–0 | Bongani Bhuti | PTS | 4 | 10 Apr 2014 | Gold Reef Entertainment Centre, Johannesburg, South Africa | |
