= David Sánchez (boxer) =

Mexican boxer (1992–2017)

Personal information
- Nickname: Tornado
- Born: 2 February 1992 Miguel Alemán, Sonora, Mexico
- Died: 19 May 2017 (aged 25) Hermosillo, Sonora, Mexico
- Weight: Super flyweight

Boxing career

Boxing record
- Total fights: 37
- Wins: 31
- Win by KO: 23
- Losses: 4
- Draws: 2

David Sánchez Cantú (2 February 1992 – 19 May 2017) was a Mexican professional boxer. Sánchez won the WBA Interim Super Flyweight title by defeating Breilor Teran in Tijuana, Baja California, Mexico on 24 May 2014.

Sánchez made his professional debut on 25 April 2008 at the age of 16, defeating Trinidad Ruiz via knockout. On 23 February 2013, he defeated Marlon Tapales at the Arena Sonora in Hermosillo to capture the WBC interim Silver super flyweight title.

== Death ==
Sanchez and his brother, fellow professional boxer Jonathan, both died when the car they were traveling in, from Hermosillo to Poblado Miguel Aleman, collided with a tractor at the Hermosillo to Bahia Kino highway.

Achievements
Vacant Title last held by Denkaosan Kaovichit	WBA Super Flyweight Champion; Interim title May 24, 2014 – September 29, 2015	Succeeded by Luis Concepción
