= Javier Gallo =

Mexican boxer (born 1983)

Personal information
- Nickname: El Girito
- Born: Javier Gallo González; 6 August 1983 (age 43) Tijuana, Baja California, Mexico
- Height: 1.72 m (5 ft 8 in)
- Weight: Bantamweight; Super Flyweight

Boxing career
- Reach: 174 cm (69 in)
- Stance: Orthodox

Boxing record
- Total fights: 42
- Wins: 25
- Win by KO: 15
- Losses: 13
- Draws: 1
- No contests: 1

Javier Gallo González (born 6 August 1983) is a Mexican professional boxer.

== Professional career ==
In May 2011, Gallo lost a majority decision to former world champion Rodel Mayol on Showtime's televised portion of the Pacquiao vs. Mosley undercard.

On 9 September 2011 at the "War at Woodland Hills 5", Gallo won with a TKO over Jason Rorie.

== Professional boxing record ==
44 fights	25 wins	17 losses
By knockout	13	7
By decision	12	10
Draws	1	
No contests	1	

No.	Result	Record	Opponent	Type	Round, Time	Date	Location	Notes
44	Loss	25–17–1 (1)	Joet Gonzalez	KO	2 (8) 1:17	8 December 2018	Fantasy Springs Casino, Indio, U.S.A.	
43	Loss	25–16–1 (1)	Christian Carto	UD	8	18 August 2018	Ocean Resort Casino, Atlantic City, U.S.A.	
42	Loss	25–15–1 (1)	Bruno Escalente	TKO	6 (8) 1:48	10 February 2018	Cache Creek Casino Resorts, Brooks, U.S.A	
41	Win	25–14–1 (1)	Jhovany Armenta Inzunza	TKO	3 (6) 1:02	23 December 2017	Score Sport Bar, Gusavae, U.S.A.	
40	Loss	24–14–1 (1)	Óscar Vásquez	UD	10	12 August 2017	Churchill County Fair Grounds, Fallon, U.S.A.	
39	Win	24–13–1 (1)	José Salgado	SD	10	15 April 2017	Cache Creek Casino Resort, Brooks, U.S.A.	
38	Win	23–13–1 (1)	Juan Beltran Dominguez	UD	6	16 September 2016	Score Sport Bar, Guasave, Mexico	
37	Win	22–13–1 (1)	Gregorio Perez Leon	UD	6	2 September 2016	Score Sport Bar, Guasave, Mexico	
36	Loss	21–13–1 (1)	Manuel Roman	MD	8	9 July 2018	Cache Creek Casino Resort, Brooks, U.S.A.	
35	Loss	21–12–1 (1)	Alexis Santiago	UD	6	8 September 2015	Hollywood Palladium, Hollywood, U.S.A.	
34	Loss	21–11–1 (1)	Rau'shee Warren	TKO	1 (10) 0:52	6 March 2015	MGM Grand, Marquee Ballroom, Las Vegas, U.S.A.	
33	NC	21–10–1 (1)	Rau'shee Warren	No contest	1 (10) 1:08	12 December 2014	UIC Pavilion, Chicago, U.S.A.	Accidental head butt
32	Loss	21–10–1	Ruben Garcia Hernandez	UD	6	30 August 2014	Del Mar Fairgrounds, Del Mar, U.S.A.	
31	Loss	21–9–1	Carlos Carlson	UD	8	Fen 28, 2014	DoubleTree Hotel, Ontario, U.S.A.	For vacant WBC Latino bantamweight title
30	Loss	21–8–1	Felipe Orucuta	TD	5 (10)	5 October 2013	Hipódromo Caliente, Arena Tecate, Tijuana, Mexico	Both Orucuta and Gallo cut over right eye from head clashes but Gallo's cut -- a vertical slice over the right eye (near bridge of nose) -- causes the fight to be stopped.
29	Win	21–7–1	David Victorio	TKO	2 (6) 1:13	17 August 2013	Cancha del Deposito "UNO", Terahuito, Guasave, Mexico	
28	Win	20–7–1	Jose Luis Dominguez	UD	6	28 July 2013	Club de Leones, Guasave, Mexico	
27	Win	19–7–1	Christian Lopez Rodriguez	TKO	2 (8) 2:28	5 July 2013	Gimnasio Municipal Luis Estrada Medina, Guasave, Mexico	
26	Loss	18–7–1	Vic Darchinyan	TKO	4 (10) 0:26	11 May 2013	Uni-Trade Stadium, Laredo, U.S.A.	
25	Loss	18–6–1	Drian Francisco	TKO	5 (8) 2:54	17 November 2012	Sports Arena, Los Angeles, U.S.A.	
24	Loss	18–5–1	David Quijano	UD	10	21 January 2012	Coliseo Pedrin Zorsilla, San Juan, Puerto Rico	
23	Win	18–4–1	Jason Rorie	TKO	3 (?)	9 September 2011	Warner Center Marriott, Woodland Hills, U.S.A.	
22	Loss	17–4–1	Rodel Mayol	MD	10	7 May 2011	MGM Grand Las Vegas, U.S.A.	
21	Win	17–3–1	Jose Luis Araiza	SD	8	4 March 2011	Warner Center Marriott, Woodland Hills, U.S.A.	
20	Loss	16–3–1	Khabir Suleymanov	KO	9 (10) 2:59	22 October 2010	Civic Auditorium, Glendale, U.S.A.	For vacant WBO-NABO bantamweight title
19	Win	16–2–1	Saturnino Nava	SD	6	30 January 2010	Auditorio Siglo XXI, Puebla, Mexico	
18	Win	15–2–1	Rene Trujillo Hernandez	TKO	2 (6)	31 October 2009	Gimnasio Del Imcufide, Toluca, Mexico	
17	Win	14–2–1	Arcadio Salazar Chanez	TKO	4 (8) 1:30	1 August 2009	Auditorio Municipal, Tijuana, Mexico	
16	Win	13–2–1	Marino Montiel	UD	6	14 February 2009	Expo Forum, Hermosillo, Mexico	
15	Draw	12–2–1	Alejandro Martinez	PTS	4	8 November 2008	Auditorio Municipal, Tijuana, Mexico	
14	Loss	12–2	Arturo Badillo	TKO	6 (8) 1:33	21 June 2008	Auditorio Municipal, Tijuana, Mexico	
13	Win	12–1	Charly Valenzuela	UD	6	19 May 2008	Auditorio Municipal, Tijuana, Mexico	
12	Win	11–1	Juan Jose Delgado	KO	1 (4)	20 October 2007	Palenque de la Expo, Ciudad Obregon, Mexico	
11	Win	10–1	Doroteo Aguilera	KO	1 (6)	9 July 2007	Salon Las Pulgas, Tijuana, Mexico	
10	Win	9–1	Jose Luis Rosales	KO	3 (6) 1:49	29 March 2007	Auditorio Municipal, Tijuana, Mexico	
9	Win	8–1	Ramon Camargo Beltran	KO	3 (6) 0:55	29 January 2007	Palenque del Hipódromo de Agua Caliente, Tijuana, Mexico	
8	Win	7–1	Daniel Gonzalez	TKO	2 (6) 2:37	13 July 2006	El Foro, Tijuana, Mexico	
7	Win	6–1	Marcelino Bojorquez	UD	4	20 May 2006	Palenque del Hipódromo de Agua Calente, Tijuana, Mexico	
6	Win	5–1	Marcelino Bojorquez	UD	6	30 September 2005	Palenque del Hipódromo de Agua Caliente, Tijuana, Mexico	
5	Win	4–1	Aurelio Santa Cruz	TKO	? (6)	23 June 2005	Mexicali, Baja California, Mexico	
4	Win	3–1	Ricardo Valencia	UD	4	11 March 2005	El Foro, Tijuana, Mexico	
3	Win	2–1	Manuel Castro	UD	4	17 December 2004	El Foro, Tijuana, Mexico	
2	Win	1–1	Edvino Corona	KO	1 (?)	15 November 2004	Auditorio Municipal, Tijuana, Mexico	
1	Loss	0–1	Marco Tovar	UD	4	19 July 2004	Auditorio Municipal, Tijuana, Mexico	
