= Roberto Vásquez =

Mexican-American boxer (born 1984)

Robert Vásquez
Personal information
- Nickname: La Araña (The Spider)
- Nationality: American
- Born: Robert Vásquez; August 11, 1984 (age 42) Oxnard, California, U.S.
- Height: 5 ft 8 in (173 cm)
- Weight: Light flyweight; Flyweight; Super flyweight; Bantamweight; Super bantamweight

Boxing career
- Reach: 65 in (165 cm)
- Stance: Southpaw

Boxing record
- Total fights: 43
- Wins: 34
- Win by KO: 23
- Losses: 7
- Draws: 2

Roberto Gaspar Vásquez Ramírez (born Aug 11, 1984) is a Mexican American professional boxer who held the WBA light flyweight title from 2005 to 2006. He also held the WBA flyweight interim title from 2006 to 2007.

== Professional career ==
Vásquez lost in his professional boxing debut against Angelo Dottin on March 17, 2001. The four-round fight occurred in Dottin's hometown of Colón, Panama. Despite Vásquez's cutting Dottin's right cheek in the first round, all three judges scored the bout 39-38 for Dottin.

Since the debut loss, Vásquez has won 22 consecutive fights. His first minor championship was the WBO Latino light flyweight title, which he won from Carlos Caballero on October 31, 2002 by fourth-round TKO. In Vásquez's next fight—on February 15, 2003—he unified the WBO and WBC Latino light flyweight titles by knocking out Marlon Márquez in the tenth round. Vásquez added the WBA Fedelatin title to his collection when he defeated Luis Doria by seventh-round TKO on November 26, 2003, becoming the first Latin American boxer to hold these three titles simultaneously in any weight división.

After he made a few title defenses in 2003 and 2004, Vásquez earned the opportunity to fight against Beibis Mendoza for the vacant WBA world light flyweight title. On April 29, 2005, Vásquez knocked down Mendoza twice in the tenth round, and after the count of 10 the referee Luis Pabon ended the fight. Vásquez then successfully defended the Light Flyweight title three times, against José Antonio Aguirre from Mexico, Nerys Espinoza from Nicaragua and Nohel Arambulet from Venezuela. After the third defense, Vásquez vacated the title in order to challenge Lorenzo Parra for the WBA flyweight title. Nevertheless, the fight programmed for Oct 10, 2006 was cancelled due to an injury in Parra's right knee which had to be operated, giving the chance to Vasquez to fight for the interim title in Bercy, Paris, France against top challenger Takefumi Sakata from Japan.

One of his trainers was María Toto.

== Professional boxing record ==
43 fights	34 wins	7 losses
By knockout	23	1
By decision	11	6
Draws	2	

No.	Result	Record	Opponent	Type	Round, time	Date	Location	Notes
43	Loss	34–7–2	(Venezuela) Edixon Perez	UD	8 (8)	2017-10-24	Fantastic Casino de Albrook Mall, Panama City	
42	Win	34–6–2	(Colombia) Mauricio Martinez	UD	6 (6)	2017-07-05	Fantastic Casino de Albrook Mall, Panama City	
41	Win	33–6–2	(Panama) Rafael Concepción	TKO	4 (10)	2015-08-08	(Uruguay) Radisson Victoria Plaza, Montevideo	
40	Loss	32–6–2	(Colombia) Walberto Ramos	SD	8 (8)	2013-08-10	Megapolis Convention Center, Panama City	
39	Draw	32–5–2	(Philippines) John Mark Apolinario	SD	12 (12)	2013-03-16	Megapolis Convention Center, Panama City	For interim WBA Bantamweight title
38	Draw	32–5–1	(Philippines) John Mark Apolinario	MD	12 (12)	2012-11-03	(Argentina) Club La Unión, Colon	For interim WBA Bantamweight title
37	Win	32–5	(Dominican Republic) Geyci Lorenzo	TKO	6 (6)	2012-08-11	(Dominican Republic) Coliseo Carlos 'Teo' Cruz, Santo Domingo	
36	Win	31–5	(Mexico) Mario Briones	UD	11 (11)	2012-03-30	Arena Roberto Duran, Panama City	
35	Loss	30–5	(Mexico) Oscar Gonzalez	UD	5 (5)	2011-09-23	Auditorio Principal del CNAR, Mexico City	
34	Win	30–4	(Mexico) Gregorio Torres	SD	5 (5)	2011-09-10	(Mexico) Deportivo Agustín Ramos Millan, Toluca	
33	Win	29–4	(Brazil) Genilson de Jesus Santos	KO	1 (5)	2011-08-20	Auditorio Principal del CNAR, Mexico City	
32	Win	28–4	(Colombia) Luis Felipe Cuadrado	UD	8 (8)	2011-01-14	Hotel RIU, Panama City	
31	Loss	27–4	(Philippines) Drian Francisco	TKO	10 (12)	2009-10-03	(Philippines) Cuneta Astrodome, Pasay	
30	Loss	27–3	(Mexico) Hugo Cázares	UD	11 (11)	2009-03-24	Centro de Convenciones Atlapa, Panama City	
29	Win	27–2	(Colombia) Felipe Rodriguez Zapata	TKO	1 (10)	2008-09-18	Centro de Convenciones Atlapa, Panama City	
28	Win	26–2	(Ecuador) Cesar Singo	TKO	3 (10)	2008-05-07	Centro de Convenciones Atlapa, Panama City	
27	Win	25–2	(Colombia) Jesus Lora	KO	2 (8)	2008-03-27	Centro de Convenciones Atlapa, Panama City	
26	Loss	24–2	(Japan) Takefumi Sakata	UD	12 (12)	2007-07-01	(Japan) Ariake Colosseum	For WBA Flyweight title
25	Win	24–1	(Japan) Takefumi Sakata	SD	12 (12)	2006-12-02	(France) Palais Omnisport de Paris-Bercy, Paris	Won interim WBA Flyweight title
24	Win	23–1	(Nicaragua) Horlan Hamilton	UD	10 (10)	2006-10-28	(Panama) Gimnasio Club de Leones, El Maranon	
23	Win	22–1	(Venezuela) Noel Arambulet	UD	12 (12)	2006-05-20	Centro de Convenciones Atlapa, Panama City	Retained WBA light flyweight title
22	Win	21–1	(Nicaragua) Nerys Espinoza	UD	12 (12)	2005-11-19	(Panama) Figali Convention Center, Fort Amador	Retained WBA light flyweight title
21	Win	20–1	(Mexico) José Antonio Aguirre	TKO	4 (12)	2005-08-20	(Panama) Figali Convention Center, Fort Amador	Retained WBA light flyweight title
20	Win	19–1	(Colombia) Beibis Mendoza	KO	10 (12)	2005-04-29	(Panama) Figali Convention Center, Fort Amador	Won vacant WBA light flyweight title
19	Win	18–1	(Colombia) Farid Cassiani	TKO	1 (10)	2004-12-11	(Panama) El Salonazo, La Chorrera	
18	Win	17–1	(Venezuela) Freddy Beleno	UD	12 (12)	2004-10-01	(Panama) Figali Convention Center, Fort Amador	
17	Win	16–1	(Venezuela) Edgar Velasquez	KO	5 (12)	2004-07-16	(Panama) Figali Convention Center, Fort Amador	
16	Win	15–1	(Colombia) Jose Garcia Bernal	TKO	11 (12)	2004-04-16	(Panama) Figali Convention Center, Fort Amador	
15	Win	14–1	(Colombia) Luis Doria	TKO	7 (12)	2003-11-26	ATLAPA Convention Center, Panama City	
14	Win	13–1	(Nicaragua) Eduardo Ray Marquez	TKO	2 (12)	2003-10-03	Gimnasio Roberto Duran, Panama City	
13	Win	12–1	(Costa Rica) Leonel Arburola	KO	1 (8)	2003-08-02	(Panama) Jardín Nuevas Glorias Soberana, Juan Diaz	
12	Win	11–1	(Panama) Jose Plinio Gonzalez	UD	8 (8)	2003-03-28	(Panama) Magnum Eventus, Bella Vista	
11	Win	10–1	(Nicaragua) Marlon Marquez	KO	10 (12)	2003-02-15	(Panama) Gimnasio Roberto Duran, Juan Diaz	
10	Win	9–1	(Colombia) Carlos Caballero	TKO	4 (12)	2002-10-31	ATLAPA Convention Center, Panama City	
9	Win	8–1	(Panama) Isidro Munoz	KO	2 (6)	2002-09-20	(Panama) Gimnasio Club de Leones, El Maranon	
8	Win	7–1	(Panama) Jorge Sanchez	KO	1 (8)	2002-08-03	(Panama) Gimnasio Club de Leones, El Maranon	
7	Win	6–1	(Panama) Edwin Rodriguez	TKO	3 (6)	2002-05-15	(Panama) Magnum Eventus, Obarrio	
6	Win	5–1	(Panama) Hussein Sanchez	KO	1 (6)	2002-03-16	(Panama) Magnum Eventus, Obarrio	
5	Win	4–1	(Panama) Alexander Murillo	KO	2 (4)	2002-01-23	(Panama) Magnum Eventus, Obarrio	
4	Win	3–1	(Panama) Agustin Menacho	SD	4 (4)	2001-11-30	(Panama) Riande Continental Hotel, Bella Vista	
3	Win	2–1	(Panama) Juvencio Caballero	KO	2 (4)	2001-09-22	(Panama) Gimnasio Municipal, Santiago de Veraguas	
2	Win	1–1	(Panama) Carlos Rodriguez	TKO	1 (4)	2001-08-29	(Panama) Magnum Eventus, Bella Vista	
1	Loss	0–1	(Panama) Angelo Dottin	UD	4 (4)	2001-03-17	(Panama) Arena Al Brown, Colon City	

== See also ==
- List of light-flyweight boxing champions
- List of flyweight boxing champions

Achievements
Vacant Title last held by Rosendo Álvarez	WBA light flyweight champion April 29, 2005 – May, 2006; Vacated	Vacant Title next held by Kōki Kameda
Vacant Title last held by Mauricio Pastrana	WBA flyweight champion Interim title December 2, 2006 – July 1, 2007; Lost bid for full title	Vacant Title next held by Luis Concepción
