= Lorenzo Parra =

Venezuelan boxer (born 1978)

Personal information
- Nickname: Lencho
- Born: Lorenzo Justiniano Parra Garcia; August 19, 1978 (age 47) Machiques, Venezuela
- Height: 5 ft 4 1/2 in (164 cm)
- Weight: Light flyweight; Flyweight; Bantamweight; Super bantamweight

Boxing career
- Reach: 66 in (168 cm)
- Stance: Orthodox

Boxing record
- Total fights: 52
- Wins: 32
- Win by KO: 19
- Losses: 18
- Draws: 2

Lorenzo Justiniano Parra Garcia (born August 19, 1978) is a Venezuelan professional boxer who held the WBA flyweight title from 2003 to 2007. He has also challenged for the WBA Super bantamweight title in 2008 and the WBA bantamweight title in 2011.

== Professional career ==
On December 6, 2003, Parra beat Eric Morel by a unanimous decision, for the WBA world championship title. Parra was stripped of his title in March 2007 after he failed to make weight for a bout with Takefumi Sakata, and went on to lose the fight anyway. As of 2019, Parra is still fighting and currently on a 14 fight Losing streak.

== Professional boxing record ==
52 fights	32 wins	18 losses
By knockout	19	8
By decision	13	9
By disqualification	0	1
Draws	2	

No.	Result	Record	Opponent	Type	Round, time	Date	Location	Notes
52	Loss	32–18–2	Jorge Guedes	PTS	4 (4)	2019-04-13	University of Minho Sports Complex, Braga, Portugal	
51	Loss	32–17–2	Arsen Garibian	TKO	3 (4)	2018-03-03	Pabellon de deportes Parque Amate, Sevilla, Spain	
50	Loss	32–16–2	Jessy Petit-Jean	RTD	4 (10)	2017-11-18	Hall Omnisport, Esneux, Belgium	
49	Loss	32–15–2	Jonathan Valero	PTS	4 (4)	2017-10-28	Pabellón Los Salesianos, Zaragoza, Spain	
48	Loss	32–14–2	Serif Gurdijeljac	UD	6 (6)	2017-09-23	Casino Flamingo, Gevgelija, North Macedonia	
47	Loss	32–13–2	Kiko Martínez	KO	3 (8)	2017-08-26	Plaza de Toros, Benidorm, Spain	
46	Loss	32–12–2	Sam Bowen	TKO	1 (6)	2017-07-07	Town Hall, Walsall, England, U.K.	
45	Loss	32–11–2	Denys Berinchyk	UD	8 (8)	2017-06-10	Sporthall Budakalász, Budakalász, Hungary	
44	Loss	32–10–2	Eloy Iglesias	UD	6 (6)	2017-05-13	Pabellón Siglo XXI, Zaragoza, Spain	
43	Loss	32–9–2	David Agadzhanyan	UD	8 (8)	2017-04-30	Oscar Event Hall, Sochi, Russia	
42	Loss	32–8–2	Victor Bonet	UD	6 (6)	2017-04-08	Poliesportu Insular Bianca Donna, Eivissa, Spain	
41	Loss	32–7–2	Andoni Gago	UD	8 (8)	2017-02-04	Frontón Bizkaia, Bilbao, Spain	
40	Loss	32–6–2	Petros Ananyan	UD	6 (6)	2017-01-08	Studio 69, Riga, Latvia	
39	Loss	32–5–2	Juli Giner	DQ	4 (8)	2016-12-02	Gran Canaria Arena, Las Palmas, Spain	
38	Win	32–4–2	Oswaldo Luengo	TKO	4 (4)	2016-09-17	Club Centro Familiar El Cruce, Machiques, Venezuela	
37	Draw	31–4–2	Jose Larreal	SD	8 (8)	2016-08-13	Complejo Deportivo Mario Romero, Machiques, Venezuela	
36	Loss	31–4–1	Jorge Arce	KO	5 (10)	2012-02-18	Centro de Espectáculos Promocasa, Mexicali, Mexico	
35	Loss	31–3–1	Anselmo Moreno	RTD	8 (12)	2011-06-17	Roberto Durán Arena, Panama City, Panama	For WBA bantamweight (Super) title
34	Draw	31–2–1	Jorge Arce	SD	10 (10)	2010-09-18	Estadio Banorte, Culiacan, Mexico	
33	Win	31–2	Oscar Chacin	UD	10 (10)	2010-03-20	Bingo Premier, Caracas, Venezuela	
32	Win	30–2	Eduardo Pacheco	UD	10 (10)	2008-08-30	Maracaibo, Venezuela	
31	Loss	29–2	Celestino Caballero	RTD	11 (12)	2008-06-07	Centro Olimpico, San Juan de Los Morros, Venezuela	For WBA super-bantamweight title
30	Win	29–1	Benjamin Rivas	TKO	2 (10)	2007-11-26	Teatro Roxi, Maracaibo, Venezuela	
29	Loss	28–1	Takefumi Sakata	TKO	3 (12)	2007-03-19	Korakuen Hall, Tokyo, Japan	Lost WBA flyweight title
28	Win	28–0	Brahim Asloum	UD	12 (12)	2005-12-05	Palais Omnisport de Paris-Bercy, Paris, France	Retained WBA flyweight title
27	Win	27–0	Takefumi Sakata	MD	12 (12)	2005-09-19	Korakuen Hall, Tokyo, Japan	Retained WBA flyweight title
26	Win	26–0	Trash Nakanuma	UD	12 (12)	2005-01-03	Ariake Coliseum, Tokyo, Japan	Retained WBA flyweight title
25	Win	25–0	Choi Yo-sam	UD	12 (12)	2004-09-09	Changchung Gymnasium, Seoul, South Korea	Retained WBA flyweight title
24	Win	24–0	Takefumi Sakata	MD	12 (12)	2004-06-04	Ariake Coliseum, Tokyo, Japan	Retained WBA flyweight title
23	Win	23–0	Eric Morel	UD	12 (12)	2003-12-06	Coliseo Rubén Rodríguez, Bayamon, Puerto Rico	Won WBA flyweight title
22	Win	22–0	Jose Luis Graterol	TKO	2 (10)	2003-07-12	La Arboleda, Porlamar	
21	Win	21–0	Diego Martinez	TKO	7 (10)	2003-05-23	Hotel Tamanaco Intercontinental, Caracas, Venezuela	
20	Win	20–0	Emilio Castro	TKO	4 (?)	2002-10-12	Tucupita, Venezuela	
19	Win	19–0	Edison Torres	TKO	12 (12)	2002-07-09	Parque Naciones Unidas, Caracas, Venezuela	Retained WBA Fedelatin flyweight title
18	Win	18–0	Vidal Estrada	TKO	3 (10)	2002-05-04	Maracaibo, Venezuela	
17	Win	17–0	Jose de Jesus Lopez	TKO	11 (12)	2001-12-21	Turmero, Venezuela	Retained WBA Fedelatin flyweight title
16	Win	16–0	Ilido Julio	UD	12 (12)	2001-07-28	Machiques, Venezuela	Won vacant WBA Fedelatin flyweight title
15	Win	15–0	Luis Blanco	KO	1 (?)	2001-05-05	El Paraíso, Venezuela	
14	Win	14–0	Gustavo Vera	TKO	5 (?)	2001-01-29	Maracaibo, Venezuela	
13	Win	13–0	Francisco Capdevilla	PTS	10 (10)	2000-12-09	Centro Recreacional Yesterday, Turmero, Venezuela	
12	Win	12–0	Vidal Estrada	TKO	2 (?)	2000-10-21	Turmero, Venezuela	
11	Win	11–0	Edgar Velasquez	UD	12 (12)	2000-09-02	Centro Recreacional Yesterday, Turmero, Venezuela	Won WBA Fedebol light-flyweight title
10	Win	10–0	Alfredo Toro	TKO	5 (10)	2000-06-30	Maracaibo, Venezuela	
9	Win	9–0	Henry Rodriguez	TKO	2 (?)	2000-04-15	Turmero, Venezuela	
8	Win	8–0	Jose Arroyo	KO	2 (?)	2000-02-26	Machiques, Venezuela	
7	Win	7–0	Euclides Bolivar	PTS	10 (10)	1999-12-04	Cumana, Venezuela	
6	Win	6–0	Francisco Capdevilla	PTS	10 (10)	1999-09-30	Caracas, Venezuela	
5	Win	5–0	Jose Arroyo	KO	2 (?)	1999-07-31	Turmero, Venezuela	
4	Win	4–0	Francisco Gomez	TKO	3 (?)	1999-06-19	Caracas, Venezuela	
3	Win	3–0	Ramon Gamez	TKO	3 (?)	1999-05-28	Cumana, Venezuela	
2	Win	2–0	Alfredo Paiva	KO	3 (?)	1999-04-13	La Guaira, Venezuela	
1	Win	1–0	Andres Medina	TKO	3 (?)	1999-03-13	Miranda, Venezuela	

== See also ==
- List of world flyweight boxing champions

Sporting positions
Regional boxing titles
New title	WBA Fedebol light-flyweight champion September 2, 2000 – 2000; Vacated	Vacant Title next held by Angelo Dottin
Vacant Title last held by José de Jesús López	WBA Fedelatin flyweight champion July 28, 2001 – 2002; Vacated	Vacant Title next held by Julio David Roque Ler
World boxing titles
Preceded by Eric Morel	WBA flyweight champion December 6, 2003 – March 18, 2007; Stripped, did not make weight	Vacant Title next held by Takefumi Sakata
