= Omar Narváez (boxer) =

Argentine boxer (born 1975)

Omar Narvaez
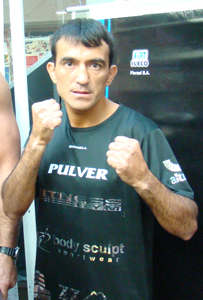

Personal information
- Nickname: El Huracán (The Hurricane)
- Born: Omar Andrés Narváez; October 7, 1975 (age 51) Trelew, Argentina
- Height: 5 ft 2 1/2 in (159 cm)
- Weight: Flyweight; Junior bantamweight; Bantamweight

Boxing career
- Reach: 64 in (163 cm)
- Stance: Southpaw

Boxing record
- Total fights: 55
- Wins: 49
- Win by KO: 25
- Losses: 4
- Draws: 2
Medal record
Representing Argentina
World Amateur Championships
| Silver medal – second place | Houston 1999 | Flyweight |
| Bronze medal – third place | Budapest 1997 | Flyweight |
Pan American Games
| Gold medal – first place | Winnipeg 1999 | Flyweight |

Omar Andrés Narváez (Spanish pronunciation: [oˈmaɾ naɾˈβaes]; born 7 October 1975) is an Argentine professional boxer. He is a two-weight world champion, having held the WBO flyweight title from 2002 to 2010, and the WBO junior bantamweight title from 2010 to 2014. Together with Julio César Chávez, Narváez holds the world record for the most successful defenses of world titles, at 27. He is the longest reigning flyweight champion in history.

As an amateur, Narváez represented Argentina at the 2000 Olympics, reaching the round of 16 of the super flyweight bracket.

== Amateur career ==
- He won the gold medal at the 1999 Pan American Games.
- 1996 Olympian, as a flyweight. His results were:
  - Defeated Joan Guzmán (Dominican Republic) 9-4
  - Lost to Mehdi Assous (Algeria) 4-20
- 1997 World Championships Bronze medalist in Budapest, HUN
- 1998 South American Games Gold medalist
- 1999 Pan American Games Gold medalist in Winnipeg, CAN, beat Manuel Mantilla (CUB) and José Navarro (USA)
- 1999 World Championships Silver medalist in Houston, USA, beat Steve Molitor (CAN)
- 2000 Olympian, as a flyweight. His results were:
  - Defeated Carlos Valcárcel (Puerto Rico) 12-6
  - Lost to Volodymyr Sydorenko (Ukraine) 10-16
    - He is one of the rare foreign boxers who have won two medals (gold / bronze) at the prestigious international boxing tournament Giraldo Cordoba Cardin, which is celebrated in Cuba every year by invitation. Omar won gold in 1999 in Villa Clara, winning the final against Filipino Arlan Lily, in the semifinals he had defeated the Guatemalan Castulo Gonzalez. In 2000, he won a bronze in the tournament in the province of Las Tunas, losing in the semifinals against the Thai Wijan Ponlid

== Professional career ==
He won the WBO world flyweight title on July 13, 2002 by a unanimous decision win over Adonis Rivas. He defended the title against 15 different contenders such as Luis Alberto Lazarate, Andrea Sarritzu, Everardo Morales, Alexander Mahmutov, Reginaldo Martins Carvalho, Bernard Inom, Rexon Flores, Walberto Ramos, Brahim Asloum, Marlon Marquez, Carlos Tamara, Iván Pozo, Alejandro "Payasito" Hernández, Rayonta Whitfield and Omar Soto.

He then moved up to Super Flyweight and won the WBO Super Flyweight title on May 15, 2010, with a unanimous points decision against Nicaraguan Everth Briceno in Buenos Aires, Argentina. That same year he won the Platinum Konex Award as the best boxer from the last decade in Argentina.

Narvaez faced Nonito Donaire on October 22, 2011, at The Theater at Madison Square Garden at Bantamweight. He lost the one-sided fight by unanimous decision, his first professional loss.

He later returned to the super flyweight division where he retained the WBO world super flyweight title eight more times, defending it against 7 other boxers before getting knocked out by Naoya Inoue in the second round on December 30, 2014. This was Narvaez first and only loss by knockout.

=== Narvaez vs. Potapov ===
On 14 October 2017, Narvaez fought Nikolay Potapov who was ranked #2 by the WBO and #12 by the IBF at bantamweight. Narvaez won the fight via technical knockout in the 7th round.

=== Narvaez vs. Tete ===
On 21 April 2018, Narvaez fought Zolani Tete for the WBO bantamweight title. Tete won by unanimous decision in their 12 round contest, 120-108, 120-108 on 120-108 on the judges' scorecards.

=== Records ===
- Longest reigning world flyweight champion (7 years, 10 months)

== Professional boxing record ==
| 55 fights | 49 wins | 4 losses |
|---|---|---|
| By knockout | 25 | 1 |
| By decision | 23 | 3 |
| By disqualification | 1 | 0 |
| Draws | 2 | |

| No. | Result | Record | Opponent | Type | Round, time | Date | Location | Notes |
|---|---|---|---|---|---|---|---|---|
| 55 | Loss | 49–4–2 | Pablo Ariel Gomez | SD | 10 | 21 Dec 2019 | Club Sportivo America, Rosario, Argentina | Lost IBF Latino bantamweight title |
| 54 | Win | 49–3–2 | Carlos Jorge Luis Sardinez | UD | 10 | 18 May 2019 | Club Huracán, Tres Arroyos, Argentina | Won vacant IBF Latino bantamweight title |
| 53 | Loss | 48–3–2 | Zolani Tete | UD | 12 | 21 Apr 2018 | SSE Arena, Belfast, Northern Ireland | For WBO bantamweight title |
| 52 | Win | 48–2–2 | Jesus Vargas | UD | 10 | 3 Feb 2018 | Nuevo Palacio Aurinegro, Puerto Madryn, Argentina | |
| 51 | Win | 47–2–2 | Nikolai Potapov | RTD | 7 (12), 3:00 | 14 Oct 2017 | Estadio Obras Sanitarias, Buenos Aires, Argentina | |
| 50 | Win | 46–2–2 | Breilor Teran | UD | 10 | 11 Jun 2016 | Gimnasio Municipal N° 1, Trelew, Argentina | Retained IBF Latino bantamweight title |
| 49 | Win | 45–2–2 | Jesus Vargas | RTD | 8 (10), 3:00 | 19 Feb 2016 | Nuevo Palacio Aurinegro, Puerto Madryn, Argentina | Won vacant IBF Latino bantamweight title |
| 48 | Win | 44–2–2 | Diego Luis Pichardo Liriano | UD | 10 | 10 Oct 2015 | Ce.De.M. N° 2, Caseros, Argentina | Won vacant WBO International junior bantamweight title |
| 47 | Loss | 43–2–2 | Naoya Inoue | KO | 2 (12), 3:01 | 30 Dec 2014 | Metropolitan Gymnasium, Tokyo, Japan | Lost WBO junior bantamweight title |
| 46 | Win | 43–1–2 | Felipe Orucuta | MD | 12 | 19 Sep 2014 | Anfiteatro Municipal, Villa María, Argentina | Retained WBO junior bantamweight title |
| 45 | Win | 42–1–2 | Antonio Tostado Garcia | KO | 4 (12), 2:59 | 17 May 2014 | Anfiteatro Municipal, Villa María, Argentina | Retained WBO junior bantamweight title |
| 44 | Win | 41–1–2 | David Carmona | TKO | 7 (12) | 21 Dec 2013 | Villa La Ñata Sporting Club, Benavídez, Argentina | Retained WBO junior bantamweight title |
| 43 | Win | 40–1–2 | Hiroyuki Hisataka | TKO | 10 (12), 1:26 | 24 Aug 2013 | Gimnasio Municipal N° 1, Trelew, Argentina | Retained WBO junior bantamweight title |
| 42 | Win | 39–1–2 | Felipe Orucuta | SD | 12 | 25 May 2013 | Estadio Luna Park, Buenos Aires, Argentina | Retained WBO junior bantamweight title |
| 41 | Win | 38–1–2 | David Quijano | UD | 12 | 15 Dec 2012 | Hilton Garden Inn Hotel & Casino, San Miguel de Tucumán, Argentina | Retained WBO junior bantamweight title |
| 40 | Win | 37–1–2 | Johnny García | KO | 11 (12), 2:55 | 20 Oct 2012 | Estadio Luna Park, Buenos Aires, Argentina | Retained WBO junior bantamweight title |
| 39 | Win | 36–1–2 | José Cabrera | UD | 12 | 21 Apr 2012 | Estadio Aldo Cantoni, San Juan, Argentina | Retained WBO junior bantamweight title |
| 38 | Loss | 35–1–2 | Nonito Donaire | UD | 12 | 22 Oct 2011 | The Theater at Madison Square Garden, New York City, New York, U.S. | For WBC and WBO bantamweight titles |
| 37 | Win | 35–0–2 | William Urina | UD | 12 | 11 Jun 2011 | Estadio Luna Park, Buenos Aires, Argentina | Retained WBO junior bantamweight title |
| 36 | Win | 34–0–2 | César Seda | UD | 12 | 15 Apr 2011 | Club Estudiantes, Bahía Blanca, Argentina | Retained WBO junior bantamweight title |
| 35 | Win | 33–0–2 | Víctor Zaleta | UD | 12 | 12 Feb 2011 | Polideportivo Municipal, Monte Hermoso, Argentina | Retained WBO junior bantamweight title |
| 34 | Win | 32–0–2 | Everth Briceno | UD | 12 | 15 May 2010 | Estadio Luna Park, Buenos Aires, Argentina | Won vacant WBO junior bantamweight title |
| 33 | Win | 31–0–2 | Santiago Acosta | UD | 10 | 24 Feb 2010 | Estadio Socios Fundadores, Comodoro, Argentina | |
| 32 | Win | 30–0–2 | Omar Soto | TKO | 11 (12), 1:58 | 26 Jun 2009 | Estadio Luna Park, Buenos Aires, Argentina | Retained WBO flyweight title |
| 31 | Win | 29–0–2 | Rayonta Whitfield | TKO | 10 (12), 0:50 | 7 Feb 2009 | Nuevo Palacio Aurinegro, Puerto Madryn, Argentina | Retained WBO flyweight title |
| 30 | Win | 28–0–2 | Alejandro Hernandez | UD | 12 | 20 Sep 2008 | Nuevo Palacio Aurinegro, Puerto Madryn, Argentina | Retained WBO flyweight title |
| 29 | Win | 27–0–2 | Iván Pozo | RTD | 7 (12), 3:00 | 9 May 2008 | Pabellon Central, Vigo, Spain | Retained WBO flyweight title |
| 28 | Win | 26–0–2 | Carlos Tamara | UD | 12 | 25 Jan 2008 | Nuevo Palacio Aurinegro, Puerto Madryn, Argentina | Retained WBO flyweight title |
| 27 | Win | 25–0–2 | Marlon Marquez | TKO | 4 (12), 2:47 | 14 Sep 2007 | Gimnasio Municipal Nº 1, Trelew, Argentina | Retained WBO flyweight title |
| 26 | Win | 24–0–2 | Brahim Asloum | UD | 12 | 10 Mar 2007 | La Palestre, Le Cannet, Argentina | Retained WBO flyweight title |
| 25 | Win | 23–0–2 | Walberto Ramos | UD | 12 | 14 Oct 2006 | Estadio Luna Park, Buenos Aires, Argentina | Retained WBO flyweight title |
| 24 | Win | 22–0–2 | Rexon Flores | UD | 12 | 5 Aug 2006 | Super Domo Orfeo, Córdoba, Argentina | Retained WBO flyweight title |
| 23 | Win | 21–0–2 | Feliciano Azuaga | TKO | 6 (10) | 21 Apr 2006 | Super Domo Orfeo, Córdoba, Argentina | |
| 22 | Win | 20–0–2 | Bernard Inom | TKO | 11 (12), 0:44 | 5 Dec 2005 | Palais Omnisport de Paris Bercy, Paris, France | Retained WBO flyweight title |
| 21 | Win | 19–0–2 | Wellington Vicente | KO | 7 (10) | 8 Apr 2005 | Gimnasio Municipal Nº 1, Trelew, Argentina | |
| 20 | Win | 18–0–2 | Marcos Obregon | KO | 5 (10) | 10 Dec 2004 | Club General Paz Juniors, Córdoba, Argentina | |
| 19 | Win | 17–0–2 | Wellington Vicente | TKO | 10 (10) | 29 Oct 2004 | Polideportivo Carlos Cerutti, Córdoba, Argentina | |
| 18 | Win | 16–0–2 | Reginaldo Martins Carvalho | TKO | 3 (12), 1:27 | 6 Mar 2004 | Estadio Luna Park, Buenos Aires, Argentina | Retained WBO flyweight title |
| 17 | Win | 15–0–2 | Alexander Makhmutov | RTD | 10 (12), 3:00 | 14 Nov 2003 | Palais Marcel Cerdan, Levallois-Perret, France | Retained WBO flyweight title |
| 16 | Draw | 14–0–2 | Andrea Sarritzu | SD | 12 | 9 Aug 2003 | Cagliari, Italy | Retained WBO flyweight title |
| 15 | Win | 14–0–1 | Everardo Morales | TKO | 5 (12) | 7 Jun 2003 | Estadio Luna Park, Buenos Aires, Argentina | Retained WBO flyweight title |
| 14 | Win | 13–0–1 | Andrea Sarritzu | SD | 12 | 14 Dec 2002 | Palazzetto dello Sport, Quartu Sant'Elena, Italy | Retained WBO flyweight title |
| 13 | Win | 12–0–1 | Luis Alberto Lazarte | DQ | 10 (12), 2:27 | 13 Sep 2002 | Gimnasio Municipal Nº 1, Trelew, Argentina | Retained WBO flyweight title; Lazarte disqualified for repeated headbutts |
| 12 | Win | 11–0–1 | Adonis Rivas | UD | 12 | 13 Jul 2002 | Estadio Luna Park, Buenos Aires, Argentina | Won WBO flyweight title |
| 11 | Win | 10–0–1 | Felipe Zapata | KO | 1 (10) | 30 Mar 2002 | Estadio F.A.B., Buenos Aires, Argentina | |
| 10 | Win | 9–0–1 | Marcos Obregon | UD | 10 | 10 Nov 2001 | Estadio F.A.B., Buenos Aires, Argentina | |
| 9 | Win | 8–0–1 | Wellington Vicente | UD | 10 | 6 Oct 2001 | Estadio F.A.B., Buenos Aires, Argentina | |
| 8 | Win | 7–0–1 | Sandro Pereyra | TKO | 1 (6), 1:46 | 21 Sep 2001 | Club General Paz Juniors, Córdoba, Argentina | |
| 7 | Win | 6–0–1 | Nicolas Vergara | TKO | 3 (6) | 25 Aug 2001 | General Lavalle, Argentina | |
| 6 | Win | 5–0–1 | Javier Arce | KO | 3 (4), 3:00 | 30 Jun 2001 | Club Rivadavia, Necochea, Argentina | |
| 5 | Draw | 4–0–1 | Carlos Montivero | MD | 4 | 9 Jun 2001 | Estadio Gibson Brown, Posadas, Argentina | |
| 4 | Win | 4–0 | Ricardo Toledo | RTD | 5 (6), 3:00 | 14 Apr 2001 | Puerto Madryn, Argentina | |
| 3 | Win | 3–0 | Ricardo Toledo | MD | 4 | 26 Jan 2001 | Necochea, Argentina | |
| 2 | Win | 2–0 | Daniel Monzon | KO | 1 (4) | 16 Dec 2000 | Estadio F.A.B., Buenos Aires, Argentina | |
| 1 | Win | 1–0 | Carlos Palacios | RTD | 4 (4) | 1 Dec 2000 | Trelew, Argentina | |

== Titles in boxing ==
=== Major world titles ===
- WBO flyweight champion (112 lbs)
- WBO super flyweight champion (115 lbs)

=== Regional/International titles ===
- WBO International super flyweight champion (115 lbs)
- IBF Latino bantamweight champion (118 lbs) (2×)

=== Honorary titles ===
- WBO Super Champion

== See also ==
- List of flyweight boxing champions
- List of super-flyweight boxing champions
- Boxing at the 1996 Summer Olympics
- Boxing at the 2000 Summer Olympics

Sporting positions
World boxing titles
| Preceded by Adonis Rivas | WBO flyweight champion July 13, 2002 – May 14, 2010 | Vacant Title next held by Julio César Miranda |
| Vacant Title last held by Jorge Arce | WBO junior bantamweight champion May 15, 2010 – December 30, 2014 | Succeeded by Naoya Inoue |
