= Arturo Badillo =

Mexican boxer (born 1987)

Personal information
- Nickname: Fuerte
- Born: 28 May 1988 (age 38) Tijuana, Baja California, Mexico
- Height: 1.74 m (5 ft 9 in)
- Weight: Bantamweight; Super Flyweight

Boxing career
- Reach: 178 cm (70 in)
- Stance: Orthodox

Boxing record
- Total fights: 31
- Wins: 21
- Win by KO: 19
- Losses: 10
- Draws: 0
- No contests: 0

Arturo Badillo (born 2 June 1987) is a Mexican professional boxer who challenged for the WBA super flyweight title in 2011.

== Professional career ==
In June 2008, Arturo knocked out title contender Javier Gallo at the Auditorio Municipal in Tijuana.

On 9 July 2011, Badillo faced Hugo Cázares in Mazatlán for the WBA super flyweight title. He was knocked out in the third round.
