= Takefumi Sakata =

Japanese boxer

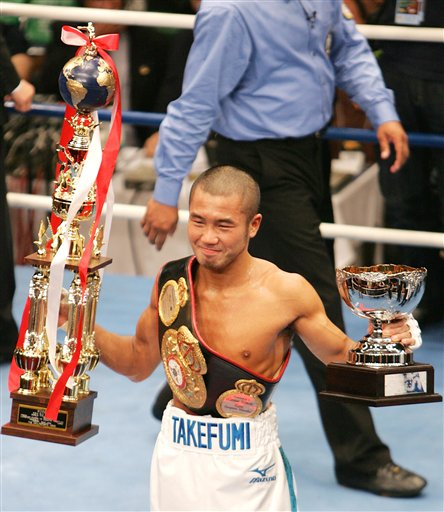

Personal information
- Nickname: Burning Fist
- Nationality: Japanese
- Born: Takefumi Sakata; January 29, 1980 (age 46) Aki District, Hiroshima, Japan
- Height: 5 ft 4 in (162 cm)
- Weight: Flyweight

Boxing career
- Stance: Orthodox

Boxing record
- Total fights: 44
- Wins: 36
- Win by KO: 17
- Losses: 6
- Draws: 2

Takefumi Sakata (坂田健史, Sakata Takefumi; born January 29, 1980 in Aki District, Hiroshima Prefecture) is a Japanese boxer in the flyweight (112 lb/50 kg) division and a former WBA flyweight champion.

Sakata was the premier boxer in the Kyoei boxing gym before the arrival of Kōki Kameda in 2005. He stayed out of the limelight for most of his career, even being used as Kameda's sparring partner, but finally won a world title in 2007, defeating Lorenzo Parra for the vacant WBA Flyweight title.

== Biography ==
=== Early career ===
Sakata began boxing when he joined his school's amateur boxing team in his first year in high school. He quit after only a couple months, but returned to boxing in his senior year, when he entered a local boxing gym, run by the father of former WBA Middlweight champion Shinji Takehara. He moved to Tokyo during summer vacation, and entered the Kyoei boxing gym to begin serious training.

=== Professional career ===
Sakata won his debut fight by 3rd-round TKO in 1998. He won the Japanese Flyweight title in 2001, and defended the title three times before losing by 10-round decision to Trash Nakanuma in 2002. He fought Nakanuma again in April, 2003, and won by decision, regaining his title. He defended the title two more times before returning it.

On June 4, 2004, Sakata fought Lorenzo Parra for the WBA Flyweight title at the Ariake Coliseum in Tokyo, Japan, but lost by 12-round decision. He fought Parra again in September of the same year, but lost by decision again.

He marked five straight wins after his losses against Parra, and fought Roberto Vasquez in Paris, France, for the WBA Flyweight interim title on December 2, 2006. He suffered a knockdown in the 5th round, but fought back hard in the second half, and Vasquez barely managed to keep his title with a 2-1 split decision.

=== World champion ===
On March 9, 2007, Sakata fought WBA Flyweight champion Lorenzo Parra for the third time, and became the champion by TKO in the 3rd round. This was Sakata's first win out of four world title matches. The day before the fight, Parra could not make the 112 lb weight limit. He tried again two hours later, but was still 4 pounds overweight. As a consequence, Parra was stripped of the title and fined 35% of his fight money. The WBA decided to hold the title match with a bantamweight limit (118 lb/53 kg), and Parra was introduced as the former champion for the fight.

Sakata has since then defended his title four times. Most recently, he retained it with a unanimous decision win over Hiroyuki Hisataka on July 30, 2008. On his fifth defense however, he was dismantled in two rounds by Denkaosan Kaovichit of Thailand on December 31, 2008.

=== Attempt to regain crown ===
Sakata received an opportunity to take back the WBA 112-lb title on September 25, 2010. There, he faced Daiki Kameda who won the title from Kaovichit in two attempts. Unfortunately for Sakata, Kameda won the bout on all score cards.

== Retirement ==
On January 13, 2011, he announced his retirement from the ring.

== Professional boxing record ==
44 fights	36 wins	6 losses
By knockout	17	1
By decision	19	5
Draws	2	

No.	Result	Record	Opponent	Type	Round, time	Date	Location	Notes
44	Loss	36–6–2	Daiki Kameda	UD	12	25 Sep 2010	Tokyo Big Sight, Tokyo, Japan	For WBA flyweight title
43	Win	36–5–2	Erick Diaz Siregar	KO	1 (10), 2:44	20 Feb 2010	Korakuen Hall, Tokyo, Japan	
42	Win	35–5–2	Decky Putra	KO	2 (10), 2:47	21 Sep 2009	Korakuen Hall, Tokyo, Japan	
41	Win	34–5–2	Jeon Jin-man	UD	10	14 Jun 2009	Korakuen Hall, Tokyo, Japan	
40	Loss	33–5–2	Denkaosan Kaovichit	KO	2 (12), 2:55	31 Dec 2008	Sun Plaza Hall, Hiroshima, Japan	Lost WBA flyweight title
39	Win	33–4–2	Hiroyuki Kudaka	UD	12	30 Jul 2008	Yoyogi First Gym, Tokyo, Japan	Retained WBA flyweight title
38	Win	32–4–2	Shingo Yamaguchi	UD	12	29 Mar 2008	Makuhari Messe, Chiba, Japan	Retained WBA flyweight title
37	Draw	31–4–2	Denkaosan Kaovichit	SD	12	4 Nov 2007	Super Arena, Saitama, Japan	Retained WBA flyweight title
36	Win	31–4–1	Roberto Vásquez	UD	12	1 Jul 2001	Ariake Coliseum, Tokyo, Japan	Retained WBA flyweight title
35	Win	30–4–1	Lorenzo Parra	TKO	3 (12), 0:14	19 Mar 2007	Korakuen Hall, Tokyo, Japan	Won WBA flyweight title
34	Loss	29–4–1	Roberto Vásquez	SD	12	2 Dec 2006	Palais Omnisport de Paris-Bercy, Paris, France	For inaugural WBA interim flyweight title
33	Win	29–3–1	Son Kyung-jin	TKO	5 (10), 2:13	18 Sep 2006	Korakuen Hall, Tokyo, Japan	
32	Win	28–3–1	Bae Ki-suk	TKO	5 (10), 1:38	17 Jul 2006	Korakuen Hall, Tokyo, Japan	
31	Win	27–3–1	Kenji Yoshida	TD	6 (10), 2:27	15 May 2006	Korakuen Hall, Tokyo, Japan	Split TD
30	Win	26–3–1	Hideyoshi Iha	TKO	5 (10), 2:44	20 Mar 2006	Korakuen Hall, Tokyo, Japan	
29	Win	25–3–1	Hiroyasu Hasebe	TKO	6 (10), 2:20	19 Dec 2005	Korakuen Hall, Tokyo, Japan	
28	Loss	24–3–1	Lorenzo Parra	MD	12	19 Sep 2005	Korakuen Hall, Tokyo, Japan	For WBA flyweight title
27	Win	24–2–1	Takuro Kodama	UD	10	18 Jul 2005	Korakuen Hall, Tokyo, Japan	
26	Win	23–2–1	Korngthranee Soonkilarnoinai	KO	1 (10), 1:51	18 Apr 2005	Korakuen Hall, Tokyo, Japan	
25	Loss	22–2–1	Lorenzo Parra	MD	12	4 Jun 2004	Ariake Coliseum, Tokyo, Japan	For WBA flyweight title
24	Win	22–1–1	Katsunori Ito	UD	10	15 Dec 2003	Korakuen Hall, Tokyo, Japan	Retained Japanese flyweight title
23	Win	21–1–1	Kazuo Okada	RTD	7 (10), 3:00	15 Sep 2003	Korakuen Hall, Tokyo, Japan	Retained Japanese flyweight title
22	Win	20–1–1	Trash Nakanuma	UD	10	5 Apr 2003	Korakuen Hall, Tokyo, Japan	Won Japanese flyweight title
21	Win	19–1–1	Kim Jin-ho	KO	2 (10), 3:10	18 Nov 2002	Korakuen Hall, Tokyo, Japan	
20	Win	18–1–1	Koki Tanaka	TD	7 (10), 0:58	15 Jul 2002	Korakuen Hall, Tokyo, Japan	Unanimous TD
19	Loss	17–1–1	Trash Nakanuma	MD	10	30 Apr 2002	Korakuen Hall, Tokyo, Japan	Lost Japanese flyweight title
18	Win	17–0–1	Mizuo Nakata	UD	10	21 Jan 2002	Korakuen Hall, Tokyo, Japan	Retained Japanese flyweight title
17	Win	16–0–1	Shiro Yahiro	TKO	9 (10), 0:30	15 Oct 2001	Korakuen Hall, Tokyo, Japan	Retained Japanese flyweight title
16	Draw	15–0–1	Daisuke Naito	MD	10	16 Jul 2001	Korakuen Hall, Tokyo, Japan	Retained Japanese flyweight title
15	Win	15–0	Masaki Kawabata	UD	10	9 Apr 2001	Korakuen Hall, Tokyo, Japan	Won vacant Japanese flyweight title
14	Win	14–0	Kim Sung-ho	TKO	3 (10), 1:01	18 Dec 2000	Korakuen Hall, Tokyo, Japan	
13	Win	13–0	Jun Magsipoc	KO	4 (10), 2:53	16 Oct 2000	Korakuen Hall, Tokyo, Japan	
12	Win	12–0	Ryuji Kubota	UD	10	21 Aug 2000	Korakuen Hall, Tokyo, Japan	
11	Win	11–0	Kid Payes	KO	3 (10), 3:09	19 Jun 2000	Korakuen Hall, Tokyo, Japan	
10	Win	10–0	Jose Clasida	UD	8	17 Apr 2000	Korakuen Hall, Tokyo, Japan	
9	Win	9–0	Leo Ramirez	TKO	4 (8), 0:38	21 Feb 2000	Korakuen Hall, Tokyo, Japan	
8	Win	8–0	Masayuki Arinaga	UD	6	18 Dec 1999	Korakuen Hall, Tokyo, Japan	
7	Win	7–0	Toshio Hagimoto	UD	6	6 Nov 1999	Korakuen Hall, Tokyo, Japan	
6	Win	6–0	Takeyuki Kojima	UD	4	27 Sep 1999	Korakuen Hall, Tokyo, Japan	
5	Win	5–0	Tetsuhiko Noguchi	TKO	3 (4), 1:55	30 Jul 1999	Korakuen Hall, Tokyo, Japan	
4	Win	4–0	Munefumi Omura	UD	6	29 Jun 1999	Korakuen Hall, Tokyo, Japan	
3	Win	3–0	Hiroshi Kuroiwa	MD	4	17 May 1999	Korakuen Hall, Tokyo, Japan	
2	Win	2–0	Shoji Okuda	UD	4	18 Jan 1999	Korakuen Hall, Tokyo, Japan	
1	Win	1–0	Akinori Fukuda	TKO	3 (4), 1:15	5 Dec 1998	Korakuen Hall, Tokyo, Japan	

== See also ==
- List of WBA world champions
- List of flyweight boxing champions
- List of Japanese boxing world champions
- Boxing in Japan

Achievements
Preceded by Celes Kobayashi (Vacated)	Japanese Flyweight Champion; April 9, 2001 - April 30, 2002	Succeeded by Trash Nakanuma
Preceded by Trash Nakanuma	Japanese Flyweight Champion; April 5, 2003 - 2004 (Vacated)	Succeeded by Hiroshi Nakano
Vacant Title last held by Lorenzo Parra; Stripped	WBA Flyweight Champion; March 19, 2007 – December 31, 2008	Succeeded by Denkaosan Kaovichit
