= Moruti Mthalane =

South African boxer

Personal information
- Nickname: Babyface
- Born: 6 October 1982 (age 44) Gauteng, South Africa
- Height: 5 ft 3 1/2 in (161 cm)
- Weight: Flyweight

Boxing career
- Reach: 66 1/2 in (169 cm)
- Stance: Orthodox

Boxing record
- Total fights: 43
- Wins: 40
- Win by KO: 26
- Losses: 3

Moruti Mthalane (born 6 October 1982) is a South African former professional boxer. He is a two-time IBF flyweight champion, having held the title between 2009 and 2021. He also held the IBO flyweight title from 2014 to 2017.

== Professional career ==
=== First IBF flyweight title reign ===
On 5 July 2009, Mthalane's promoter Branco Milenkovic revealed that Mthalane was designated by the IBF as the mandatory challenger for Nonito Donaire IBF flyweight title. Before the terms of the fight could be negotiated however, Donaire vacated the title and moved up to super flyweight. Accordingly, the IBF ordered a fight between Eric Ortiz and Julio Cesar Miranda to determine who would fight Mthalane for the vacant title, with Miranda winning by a first-round knockout. The fight for the vacant world title was scheduled for 20 November 2009, and was held at the Wembley Indoor Arena in Johannesburg, South Africa. Mthalane won the fight by unanimous decision, with scores of 117-111, 117-111 and 118-111. He became the third South African fighter in 2009 to win a major IBF title.

On 1 March 2010, Zolani Tete was designated as the IBF flyweight mandatory title challenger after defeating Richard Garcia by unanimous decision in an IBF flyweight title eliminator. The IBF flyweight world title fight between Mthalane and Tete was scheduled for 1 September 2010, at the Carnival City in Brakpan, South Africa. Mthalane won the fight by knockout, stopping Tete at the 2:27 minute mark of the fifth round.

Mthalane made his second IBF title defense against Johnriel Casimero on 26 March 2011 at the Nasrec Indoor Arena in Johannesburg, South Africa. Mthalane won the fight by a fifth-round technical knockout. The bout was high in both pace and volume from the beginning, with Casimero fading as the fight went on, before he stopped defending himself effectively in the fifth round.

Mthalane was scheduled to make his third title defense against Andrea Sarritzu on 28 October 2011. The bout took place at the PalaRockfeller in Cagliari, Italy, which was his first fight outside of the South African Republic. Mthalane stopped the 35-year-old Sardinian by a seventh-round technical knockout, after Sarritzu's corner threw in the towel.

On 1 June 2012, the IBF ordered Mthalane to defend his title against Ricardo Nunez, giving the two camps a 30-day negotiation period to come to terms. Mthalane had a great start to the fight, as he managed to knock Nunez down in the second minute of the first round. Nunez knocked Mthalane down in turn in the third round, and began to take over the fight from that point until the seventh round. Mthalane rallied back in the from that point forward, before finally stopping Nunez in the eight round.

Mthalane was stripped of the IBF title in January 2014, after failing to come to terms with mandatory challenger Amnat Ruenroeng.

=== IBO flyweight champion ===
==== Mthalane vs. Oliva ====
18 months after his last fight, Mthalane was scheduled to face Jether Oliva for the vacant IBO flyweight title on 15 March 2014. He won the fight by split decision, with two judges awarding him a 116-112 and 117-112 scorecard respectively, while the third judge scored the fight 115-113 for Oliva.

==== Mthalane vs. Zaleta ====
Mthalane made his first IBO flyweight title defense against Odilon Zaleta on 26 October 2014 at the Olive Convention Centre in Durban, South Africa. He won the fight by unanimous decision, with scores of 116-112, 117-111 and 117-111. Mthalane was scheduled to defend his IBO flyweight title for the second time against Renz Rosia on 15 December 2015, at the Olive Convention Centre in Durban, South Africa. He won the fight by a ninth-round stoppage, as Rosia refused to come out of his corner for the tenth round. Mthalane faced Genisis Libranza in his third IBO title defense on 28 April 2017, following a near-17-month hiatus from boxing. He won the fight by a fourth-round knockout, stopping Libranza with a body shot.

==== Mthalane vs. Quaye ====
Mthalane faced Isaac Quaye in a ten-round non-title bout on 24 September 2017. He won the fight by a second-round technical knockout. This was his last fight as an IBO champion, as he was vacated the title on 20 October 2017 to fight in an IBF sanctioned bout next.

=== Second IBF flyweight title reign ===
It was announced on 17 October 2017, that the #10 ranked IBF flyweight contender Mthalane would face Ardin Diale for the vacant IBF International flyweight title. Mthalane won the fight by a second-round technical knockout. Following this victory, his promoter Tshele Kometsi began negotiating with the IBF for an IBF title eliminator bout.

==== Mthalane vs. Waseem ====
A title eliminator bout proved unnecessary, as the reigning IBF flyweight champion Donnie Nietes opted to vacate the title to move up in weight. Mthalane was instead scheduled to face Muhammad Waseem at the Axiata Arena in Kuala Lumpur, Malaysia. The fight was originally meant to be an eliminator before champion Donnie Nietes vacated the belt. Mthalane won the fight by unanimous decision, with scores of 114-113, 114-113 and 116-110. He faced most difficulty in the sixth round, after being knocked down by Waseem, but managed to recover sufficiently to edge out the bout in his favor.

==== Mthalane vs. Sakamoto ====
Mthalane made his first IBF title defense of his second reign against Masahiro Sakamoto on 31 December 2018 at the Wynn Palace in Macau. The #14 ranked IBF flyweight contender Sakamoto came in as a heavy underdog, which proved true in the fight, as Mthalane won the fight by a tenth-round technical knockout. He expressed his desire to unify with the new WBC flyweight champion Charlie Edwards, saying "At the moment I’m looking for the new champion Charlie Edwards. I would be very happy to get a chance to unify against him".

==== Mthalane vs. Kuroda ====
Mthalane made his second title defense against Masayuki Kuroda, who was at the time ranked as the ninth best flyweight in the world by The Ring, on 13 May 2019 at the Korakuen Hall in Tokyo, Japan. He won the fight by unanimous decision, with scores of 116-112, 116-112, and 117-111.

==== Mthalane vs. Yaegashi ====
Mthalane was scheduled to make his third title defense against the former WBC, Ring, and lineal flyweight champion Akira Yaegashi on 23 December 2019 at the Yokohama Arena in Yokohama, Japan. Yaegashi was ranked #14 by the IBF at flyweight. He won the fight by a ninth-round technical knockout, with CompuBox recording 1200 punches thrown. Mthalane began to take over from the seventh round onward, finally stopping his opponent with a flurry near the end of the ninth round.

==== Mthalane vs. Edwards ====
Mthalane was scheduled to make his fourth title defense against Sunny Edwards on 30 April 2021, 16 months from his last fight, at the York Hall in London, England. Despite Mthalane being able to close the gap in the latter part of the fight, Edwards just built up too big of a lead in the first half of the fight. Mthalane lost the fight by unanimous decision, with scores of 118–111, 120–108 and 115–113.

== Professional boxing record ==
| 43 fights | 40 wins | 3 losses |
|---|---|---|
| By knockout | 26 | 2 |
| By decision | 14 | 1 |

| No. | Result | Record | Opponent | Type | Round, time | Date | Location | Notes |
|---|---|---|---|---|---|---|---|---|
| 43 | Win | 40–3 | Diomel Diocos | PTS | 10 | 2 Oct 2022 | Pietermaritzburg, South Africa | |
| 42 | Loss | 39–3 | Sunny Edwards | UD | 12 | 30 Apr 2021 | York Hall, London, England | Lost IBF flyweight title |
| 41 | Win | 39–2 | Akira Yaegashi | TKO | 9 (12), 2:54 | 23 Dec 2019 | Yokohama Arena, Yokohama, Japan | Retained IBF flyweight title |
| 40 | Win | 38–2 | Masayuki Kuroda | UD | 12 | 13 May 2019 | Korakuen Hall, Tokyo, Japan | Retained IBF flyweight title |
| 39 | Win | 37–2 | Masahiro Sakamoto | TKO | 10 (12) | 31 Dec 2018 | Wynn Palace, Macau, SAR | Retained IBF flyweight title |
| 38 | Win | 36–2 | Muhammad Waseem | UD | 12 | 15 Jul 2018 | Axiata Arena, Kuala Lumpur, Malaysia | Won vacant IBF flyweight title |
| 37 | Win | 35–2 | Ardin Diale | TKO | 2 (12) | 27 Oct 2017 | Convention Centre, Mmabatho, South Africa | Won vacant IBF International flyweight title |
| 36 | Win | 34–2 | Isaac Quaye | TKO | 2 (10) | 24 Sep 2017 | Ramosa Community Hall, Mohlakeng, South Africa | |
| 35 | Win | 33–2 | Genisis Libranza | KO | 4 (12) | 28 Apr 2017 | Wembley Indoor Arena, Johannesburg, South Africa | Retained IBO flyweight title |
| 34 | Win | 32–2 | Renz Rosia | TKO | 9 (12) | 15 Dec 2015 | Olive Convention Centre, Durban, South Africa | Retained IBO flyweight title |
| 33 | Win | 31–2 | Odilon Zaleta | UD | 12 | 26 Oct 2014 | International Convention Centre, Durban, South Africa | Retained IBO flyweight title |
| 32 | Win | 30–2 | Jether Oliva | SD | 12 | 15 Mar 2014 | International Convention Centre, Durban, South Africa | Won vacant IBO flyweight title |
| 31 | Win | 29–2 | Ricardo Núñez | TKO | 8 (12), 2:41 | 1 Sep 2012 | Roberto Durán Arena, Panama City, Panama | Retained IBF flyweight title |
| 30 | Win | 28–2 | Andrea Sarritzu | TKO | 7 (12) | 28 Oct 2011 | PalaRockfeller, Cagliari, Italy | Retained IBF flyweight title |
| 29 | Win | 27–2 | Johnriel Casimero | TKO | 5 (12), 1:50 | 26 Mar 2011 | Nasrec Indoor Arena, Johannesburg, South Africa | Retained IBF flyweight title |
| 28 | Win | 26–2 | Zolani Tete | TKO | 5 (12), 2:27 | 1 Sep 2010 | Carnival City, Brakpan, South Africa | Retained IBF flyweight title |
| 27 | Win | 25–2 | Julio César Miranda | UD | 12 | 20 Nov 2009 | Wembley Indoor Arena, Johannesburg, South Africa | Won vacant IBF flyweight title |
| 26 | Win | 24–2 | Lehlohonolo Ramagole | KO | 3 (12), 2:26 | 18 Apr 2009 | North-West University Sports Complex, Mafikeng, South Africa | |
| 25 | Loss | 23–2 | Nonito Donaire | TKO | 6 (12), 1:31 | 1 Nov 2008 | Mandalay Bay Events Center, Paradise, Nevada, US | For IBF and IBO flyweight titles |
| 24 | Win | 23–1 | Hussein Hussein | UD | 12 | 5 Jul 2008 | Jan Smuts Stadium, East London, South Africa | |
| 23 | Win | 22–1 | Joel Kunene | TKO | 5 (12) | 12 Apr 2008 | North-West University Sports Complex, Mahikeng, South Africa | Retained South African flyweight title |
| 22 | Win | 21–1 | Apol Suico | TKO | 1 (12), 2:22 | 29 Sep 2007 | Park Station Concourse, Johannesburg, South Africa | Won vacant WBC International flyweight title |
| 21 | Win | 20–1 | Xola Sifama | TKO | 5 (12), 2:38 | 16 Jun 2007 | Jabulani Mall, Soweto, South Africa | Retained South African flyweight title |
| 20 | Win | 19–1 | Zamumzi Xola | TKO | 3 (12), 2:23 | 1 Dec 2006 | Orlando Communal Hall, Soweto, South Africa | Retained South African flyweight title |
| 19 | Win | 18–1 | Akhona Aliva | KO | 6 (12), 1:37 | 11 Aug 2006 | Orient Theatre, East London, South Africa | Won South African flyweight title |
| 18 | Win | 17–1 | Mbulelo Nyanda | TKO | 4 (8) | 3 Sep 2005 | Park Station Concourse, Johannesburg, South Africa | |
| 17 | Win | 16–1 | Thembelani Maphuma | KO | 6 (8) | 28 May 2005 | Park Station Concourse, Johannesburg, South Africa | |
| 16 | Win | 15–1 | Siphiwe Khumalo | PTS | 6 | 12 Mar 2005 | Park Station Concourse, Johannesburg, South Africa | |
| 15 | Loss | 14–1 | Nkqubela Gwazela | TKO | 10 (12), 2:35 | 24 Sep 2004 | Graceland Hotel Casino, Secunda, South Africa | For South African and vacant WBC International flyweight titles |
| 14 | Win | 14–0 | Vincent Mogotsi | TKO | 7 (8), 1:10 | 26 Jun 2004 | Park Station Concourse, Johannesburg, South Africa | |
| 13 | Win | 13–0 | Joel Kunene | PTS | 6 | 8 May 2004 | Carousel Casino, Hammanskraal, South Africa | |
| 12 | Win | 12–0 | Thabo Tshehla | TKO | 3 (4) | 24 Feb 2004 | Carousel Casino, Hammanskraal, South Africa | |
| 11 | Win | 11–0 | Piet Nkate | TKO | 3 (6) | 28 Nov 2003 | Carousel Casino, Hammanskraal, South Africa | |
| 10 | Win | 10–0 | Siphiwe Khumalo | TKO | 5 (6) | 30 Sep 2003 | Carousel Casino, Hammanskraal, South Africa | |
| 9 | Win | 9–0 | Mpumezi Mazantsi | KO | 1 (4) | 15 Aug 2003 | Inst. of Technology Hall, Durban, South Africa | |
| 8 | Win | 8–0 | Nelson Sebobiso | PTS | 6 | 25 Jun 2003 | Park Station Concourse, Johannesburg, South Africa | |
| 7 | Win | 7–0 | Joel Kunene | PTS | 8 | 7 Dec 2002 | The Arena, Durban, South Africa | |
| 6 | Win | 6–0 | Nyiko Zitha | TKO | 3 (4) | 13 Jul 2002 | Town Hall, Giyani, South Africa | |
| 5 | Win | 5–0 | Sibonelo Gumede | PTS | 4 | 14 Dec 2001 | DLI Hall, Durban, South Africa | |
| 4 | Win | 4–0 | Wiseman Mnguni | TKO | 3 (4) | 8 Jul 2001 | The Arena, Durban, South Africa | |
| 3 | Win | 3–0 | Sibongakonke Mchunu | PTS | 4 | 27 Apr 2001 | The Arena, Durban, South Africa | |
| 2 | Win | 2–0 | Ishmael Mtshali | PTS | 4 | 21 Jan 2001 | The Arena, Durban, South Africa | |
| 1 | Win | 1–0 | Wiseman Mnguni | KO | 3 (4) | 10 Dec 2000 | The Arena, Durban, South Africa | |

== See also ==
- List of flyweight boxing champions

Sporting positions
Regional boxing titles
| Vacant Title last held by Armando Santos | IBF International flyweight champion 27 October 2017 – 15 July 2018; Won world title | Vacant Title next held by Sunny Edwards |
Minor world boxing titles
| Vacant Title last held by César Seda | IBO flyweight champion 15 March 2014 – 2017; Vacated | Vacant Title last held by Maximino Flores |
Major world boxing titles
| Vacant Title last held by Nonito Donaire | IBF flyweight champion 20 November 2009 – 13 January 2014; Vacated | Vacant Title next held by Amnat Ruenroeng |
| Vacant Title last held by Donnie Nietes | IBF flyweight champion 15 July 2018 – 30 April 2021 | Succeeded by Sunny Edwards |
