= Rocky Fuentes =

Filipino boxer

Personal information
- Nickname: The Road Warrior
- Nationality: Filipino
- Born: Rocky Labiogo Fuentes; February 10, 1986 (age 40) Cebu City, Cebu, Philippines
- Height: 1.60 m (5 ft 3 in)
- Weight: Light flyweight; Flyweight; Super flyweight; Bantamweight; Super bantamweight

Boxing career
- Reach: 166 cm (65 in)
- Stance: Orthodox

Boxing record
- Total fights: 47
- Wins: 36
- Win by KO: 20
- Losses: 9
- Draws: 2

Rocky Fuentes (born February 10, 1986) is a Filipino former professional boxer.

His first flyweight title shot came against Amnat Ruenroeng in a bout for the International Boxing Federation (IBF) world title, but he was unable to secure the victory. In his second attempt, Fuentes unsuccessfully faced off against Román González for the World Boxing Council Council (WBC) world title. Fuentes also lost via split decision in a match against Richie Mepranum in December 2007.

== Professional boxing record ==
47 fights	36 wins	9 losses
By knockout	20	4
By decision	16	5
Draws	2	

No.	Result	Record	Opponent	Type	Round, Time	Date	Location	Notes
47	Win	36–9–2	Ryan Tampus	UD	6	25 Nov 2017	Bohol Wisdom School Gym, Tagbilaran City, Philippines	
46	Loss	35–9–2	Shohei Omori	KO	3 (8) 2:30	31 Dec 2016	Shimadzu Arena, Kyoto, Japan	
45	Win	35–8–2	Romnick Magos	MD	8	23 Apr 2016	Cebu City Sports Complex, Cebu City, Philippines	
44	Win	34–8–2	Afrizal Tamboresi	KO	2 (8) 1:01	28 Nov 2015	Hoops Dome, Lapu-Lapu City, Philippines	
43	Loss	33–8–2	Román González	TKO	6 (12) 2:11	22 Nov 2014	Yokohama International Swimming Pool, Yokohama, Japan	For WBC and The Ring flyweight titles
42	Loss	33–7–2	Amnat Ruenroeng	UD	12	22 Jan 2014	Liptapanlop Hall, Nakhon Ratchasima, Thailand	For vacant IBF flyweight title
41	Win	33–6–2	Juan Kantun	UD	10	20 Apr 2013	University of Southeastern Philippines Gymnasium, Davao City, Philippines	
40	Win	32–6–2	Yuki Nasu	UD	12	18 Dec 2012	Korakuen Hall, Tokyo, Japan	Retained OPBF flyweight title
39	Win	31–6–2	Myung Ho Lee	UD	12	22 Sep 2012	Waterfront Cebu City Hotel & Casino, Barangay Lahug, Cebu City, Philippines	Retained OPBF flyweight title
38	Win	30–6–2	Javier Franco	KO	6 (10) 0:52	24 Mar 2012	Waterfront Cebu City Hotel & Casino, Barangay Lahug, Cebu City, Philippines	
37	Win	29–6–2	Lookdiew Tor Buamas	TKO	2 (8) 2:55	10 Dec 2011	Hoops Dome, Lapu-Lapu City, Philippines	
36	Win	28–6–2	Hirofumi Mukai	UD	12	20 Aug 2011	Sumiyoshi Ward Center, Osaka, Japan	Retained OPBF flyweight title
35	Win	27–6–2	Jemmy Gobel	UD	8	19 Mar 2011	Waterfront Cebu City Hotel & Casino, Barangay Lahug, Cebu City, Philippines	
34	Win	26–6–2	Inthanon Sithchamuang	TKO	2 (12) 2:19	27 Nov 2010	Waterfront Cebu City Hotel & Casino, Barangay Lahug, Cebu City, Philippines	Retained OPBF flyweight title
33	Win	25–6–2	Yasuto Aritomi	TKO	8 (12) 2:13	5 Sep 2010	Nagoya International Conference Hall, Nagoya, Japan	Retained OPBF flyweight tirle
32	Win	24–6–2	Shigetaka Ikehara	TKO	11 (12) 2:09	5 Jun 2010	Korakuen Hall, Tokyo, Japan	Retained OPBF flyweight title
31	Win	23–6–2	Masafumi Okubo	MD	12	9 Mar 2010	Korakuen Hall, Tokyo, Japan	Won OPBF flyweight title
30	Win	22–6–2	Pit Anacaya	KO	3 (10) 0:34	17 Jan 2010	Gaisano Country Mall Parking Lot, Barangay Banilad, Cebu City, Philippines	
29	Win	21–6–2	Allan Ranada	KO	2 (8) 2:25	27 Jun 2009	Mandaue City Plaza Square, Barangay Centro, Mandaue City, Philippines	
28	Win	20–6–2	Eric Rapada	UD	10	21 Mar 2009	Negros Occidental Multi-Purpose Activity Center(Nompac), Bacold City, Philippines	
27	Win	19–6–2	Lowie Bantigue	KO	8 (12) 2:56	5 Oct 2008	Bantayan Multi-Purpose Center, Bantayan, Philippines	Retained GAB flyweight title
26	Loss	18–6–2	Richie Mepranum	SD	8	2 Dec 2007	Araneta Coliseum, Barabgay Cubao, Quezon City, Philippines	
25	Win	18–5–2	Danilo Lerio	UD	12	30 Sep 2007	Waterfront Cebu City Hotel & Casino, Barangay Lahug, Cebu City, Philippines	Retained GAB flyweight title
24	Win	17–5–2	Benedict Suico	TKO	8 (12) 2:53	7 Jul 2007	Waterfront Cebu City Hotel & Casino, Barangay Lahug, Cebu City, Philippines	Won vacant GAB flyweight title
23	Win	16–5–2	Greg Mangan	UD	10	20 Jan 2007	Mandaue City Sports and Cultural Complex, Barangay Centro, Mandaue City, Philippines	
22	Win	15–5–2	Rolly Mandahinog	TKO	2 (10) 0:43	8 Dec 2008	Talisay City Sports Complex, Talisay City, Philippines	
21	Win	14–5–2	Yuki Nasu	SD	10	8 Oct 2006	IMP Hall, Osaka, Japan	
20	Win	13–5–2	Jerry Manganip	TKO	4 (10) 2:42	9 Sep 2006	Danao Sports Complex, Danao City, Philippines	
19	Win	12–5–2	Ricky Manatad	KO	1 (8) 0:51	15 Jun 2006	Ringside Boxing Club, Metropolis Mall, Barangay Alabang, Muntinlupa City, Philippines	
18	Loss	11–5–2	Jojo Bardon	UD	12	18 Mar 2006	Mandaue City Sports and Cultural Complex, Barangay Centro, Mandaue City, Philippines	For vacant GAB flyweight title
17	Loss	11–4–2	Kaichon Sor Vorapin	UD	12	31 Jan 2006	Tha Sae, Thailand	For vacant WBO Asia Pacific light flyweight title
16	Win	11–3–2	Bert Gawat	UD	10	29 Oct 2005	Mandaue City Sports and Cultural Complex, Barangay Centro, Mandaue City, Philippines	
15	Win	10–3–2	Dickson Ton	SD	10	16 Aug 2005	RCTI Studio, Jakarta, Indonesia	
14	Win	9–3–2	Dolfi Lolaru	KO	5 (10)	26 Jul 2005	RCTI Studio, Jakarta, Indonesia	
13	Win	8–3–2	Anis Ceunfin	TKO	1 (10)	28 Jun 2005	RCTI Studio, Jakarta, Indonesia	
12	Loss	7–3–2	Angky Angkotta	KO	1 (10)	7 May 2005	RCTI Studio, Jakarta, Indonesia	
11	Draw	7–2–2	Chana Porpaoin	PTS	6	15 Mar 2005	Sithrep District, Petchaboon, Thailand	
10	Win	7–2–1	Eddie Villegas	TKO	2 (8) 2:35	29 Jan 2005	Mandaue City Sports and Cultural Complex, Barangay Centro, Mandaue City, Philippines	
9	Draw	6–2–1	Greg Mangan	SD	8	16 Jan 2005	Gaisano Country Mall Parking Lot, Barangay Banilad, Cebu City, Philippines	
8	Loss	6–2	Kaichon Sor Vorapin	TKO	6 (12)	28 Oct 2004	Tha Pla, Thailand	For WBO Asia Pacific light flyweight title
7	Loss	6–1	Panomroonglek Kratingdaenggym	UD	6	27 Aug 2004	Khukhan, Thailand	
6	Win	6–0	Philip Parcon	KO	3 (10) 1:15	22 May 2004	Mandaue City Sports and Cultural Complex, Barangay Centro, Mandaue City, Philippines	Won PBF minimumweight title
5	Win	5–0	Steve Demaisip	UD	10	28 Mar 2004	Ynares Sr. Memorial Gym, Binangonan, Philippines	
4	Win	4–0	Allan Dugang	UD	10	28 Feb 2004	Mandaue City Sports and Cultural Complex, Barangay Centro, Mandaue City, Philippines	
3	Win	3–0	John Eman Juarez	KO	4 (8) 2:47	28 Dec 2003	Danao Sports Complex, Danao City, Philippines	
2	Win	2–0	Romeo Tura	TKO	1 (6)	4 Oct 2003	Mandaue City Sports and Cultural Complex, Barangay Centro, Mandaue City, Philippines	
1	Win	1–0	Dodong Zalde	KO	1 (6)	26 Jul 2003	Mandaue City Sports and Cultural Complex, Barangay Centro, Mandaue City, Philippines	
