= Bradley Hore =

Australian boxer

Brad Hore
Personal information
- Nationality: Australian
- Born: Bradley Arthur Hore; 22 October 1981 (age 44) Blacktown, New South Wales, Australia
- Height: 5 ft 5.5 in (1.66 m)
- Weight: Super Bantamweight

Boxing career

Boxing record
- Total fights: 7
- Wins: 5
- Win by KO: 0
- Losses: 2
- Draws: 0
- No contests: 0

Bradley Arthur Hore (born 22 October 1981 in Blacktown, New South Wales) is an Indigenous Australian male boxer who represented his country and his peoples as a 2 x Olympic & Commonwealth Games athlete. Hore turned pro on 27 July 2012 and competed as a professional in the Super Bantamweight and Super Flyweight divisions. He holds the WBF Superfly Title, WBU Australasian Superfly title and is a Queensland Bantamweight Champion. Hore, retired from his professional boxing career in 2016 after starting the charity "Keep Your Hands To Yourself" which raises awareness against drug & alcohol induced violence.

As an amateur he competed in 214 fights with a record 177 wins of which included the 2000 Sydney Olympic Games, 2002 Manchester Commonwealth Games, 2004 Athens Olympic Games and 2006 Melbourne Commonwealth Games. He competed for his native country as the favourite and Australian and Oceania champion at the 2004 Summer Olympics in Athens, Greece, where he was stopped in the second round of the men's flyweight division (– 51 kg) by USA's Ronald Siler (18-32).

Hore was an Australian Institute of Sport scholarship holder spending many years training under the Australian Sport Institute Banner .

Hore is the 23rd Indigenous Olympian and represents his people proudly as an Indigenous Outreach Worker with North Coast Aboriginal Corporation for Indigenous Health on the Sunshine Coast, Queensland, where he lives with his partner and children.

Hore also works for the Australian Olympic Committee as an ambassador for school sport and encourages children to aim high and never give up. Hore is also an ambassador for the Indigenous Marathon Foundation and a representative for the Indigenous sporting community. The Australian Olympic committee recently represented Brad in a NAIDOC week celebratory edition of their magazine https://www.olympics.com.au/news/brad-hore-changing-the-trajectory-for-indigenous-youth/

Hore trains at The Boxing Shop at the Nathan Campus of Griffith University in Brisbane under coach Gareth Williams.

Hore recently took up painting, with a traditional Indigenous style which can be found in many iconic places in Queensland; including being represented on apparel and other media.

== Professional boxing record ==
7 fights	5 wins	2 losses
By knockout	0	2
By decision	5	0

No.	Result	Record	Opponent	Type	Round, time	Date	Location	Notes
7	Loss	5–2	Rex Tso	TKO	7 (10), 2:52	29 Aug 2015	Convention and Exhibition Centre, Wan Chai, Hong Kong	For vacant WBC-ABCO super flyweight title
6	Win	5–1	Afrizal Tamboresi	UD	10	23 May 2015	The Sands Tavern, Maroochydore, Australia	Won inaugural WBF (Foundation) Asia Pacific super flyweight title
5	Win	4–1	John Bajawa	UD	10	29 Nov 2014	Grand Hotel Yamanto, Ipswich, Australia	Won vacant WBU Australasian super flyweight title
4	Win	3–1	Tommy Clarke	UD	8	24 May 2013	RSL Stadium, Townsville, Australia	Won vacant Queensland State bantamweight title
3	Loss	2–1	Roberto Lerio	KO	3 (10), 2:52	20 Apr 2013	Royal International Convention Centre, Bowen Hills, Australia	For Australian bantamweight title
2	Win	2–0	Petchumphon Kietbanditgym	UD	8	2 Nov 2012	The Sands Tavern, Maroochydore, Australia	
1	Win	1–0	David Smith	UD	6	27 Jul 2012	The Sands Tavern, Maroochydore, Australia	
