= Anthony Nelson (boxer) =

English boxer (born 1985)

Personal information
- Nickname: Babyface
- Born: Anthony Nelson; 9 November 1985 (age 40) South Shields, Tyne and Wear, England
- Weight: Super flyweight

Boxing career
- Stance: Orthodox

Boxing record
- Total fights: 14
- Wins: 12
- Win by KO: 2
- Losses: 2

Anthony 'Babyface' Nelson (born 9 November 1985) is a British former professional boxer who competed from 2012 to 2018. He held multiple regional titles including the Northern Area super flyweight title in 2013, the English super flyweight title in 2014, and the Commonwealth super flyweight title from 2015 to 2016.

== Professional boxing record ==
14 fights	12 wins	2 losses
By knockout	2	2
By decision	10	0

No.	Result	Record	Opponent	Type	Round, time	Date	Location	Notes
14	Loss	12–2	(United Kingdom) Charlie Edwards	KO	3 (10)	16 Jun 2018	(United Kingdom) Metro Radio Arena, Newcastle, England	For Vacant WBA Continental super flyweight title
13	Win	12–1	(Lithuania) Simas Volosinas	PTS	6	28 Apr 2018	(United Kingdom) Temple Park Leisure Centre, South Shields, England	
12	Loss	11–1	(United Kingdom) Jamie Conlan	KO	8 (12)	30 Apr 2016	(United Kingdom) Copper Box Arena, Hackney Wick, London, England	Lost Commonwealth super flyweight title
11	Win	11–0	(United Kingdom) Ian Halsall	PTS	6	18 Sep 2015	(United Kingdom) Riverside Lodge, Morpeth, Northumberland, England	
10	Win	10–0	(United Kingdom) Jamie Wilson	RTD	6 (12)	4 Apr 2015	(United Kingdom) Metro Radio Arena, Newcastle, England	Won Commonwealth super flyweight title
9	Win	9–0	(United Kingdom) Terry Broadbent	UD	10	12 Oct 2014	(United Kingdom) Temple Park Leisure Centre, South Shields, England	Won vacant English super flyweight title
8	Win	8–0	(United Kingdom) Usman Ahmed	PTS	4	7 Dec 2013	(United Kingdom) Centre for Sport, Newcastle, England	
7	Win	7–0	(United Kingdom) Mohammed Waqas	PTS	10	7 Jul 2013	(United Kingdom) Stadium of Light, Sunderland, England	Won vacant Northern Area super flyweight title
6	Win	6–0	(United Kingdom) Ryan McNicol	PTS	4	19 Apr 2013	(United Kingdom) Rainton Meadows Arena, Houghton-le-Spring, Tyne and Wear, England	
5	Win	5–0	(United Kingdom) Francis Croes	PTS	6	15 Feb 2013	(United Kingdom) Rainton Meadows Arena, Houghton-le-Spring, Tyne and Wear, England	
4	Win	4–0	(United Kingdom) Anwar Alfadli	PTS	4	24 Nov 2012	(United Kingdom) O2 Academy, Newcastle, England	
3	Win	3–0	(United Kingdom) Delroy Spencer	PTS	4	9 Sep 2012	(United Kingdom) O2 Academy, Newcastle, England	
2	Win	2–0	(United Kingdom) James Ancliff	TKO	2 (4)	15 Jul 2012	(United Kingdom) Stadium of Light, Sunderland, England	
1	Win	1–0	(United Kingdom) Jonathan Fry	PTS	4	20 May 2012	(United Kingdom) Rainton Meadows Arena, Houghton-le-Spring, Tyne and Wear, England	
