= Jamie Conlan =

Irish boxer

Personal information
- Nicknames: The Mexican; The Irish Gatti
- Born: 11 October 1986 (age 40) Belfast Northern Ireland
- Height: 5 ft 7 in (170 cm)
- Weight: Super-flyweight

Boxing career
- Reach: 72 in (183 cm)
- Stance: Orthodox

Boxing record
- Total fights: 20
- Wins: 19
- Win by KO: 11
- Losses: 1

Jamie Conlan (born 10 October 1986) is a former professional boxer from Northern Ireland who competed from 2009 to 2017, and has since worked as a boxing manager. He held the Commonwealth super-flyweight title in 2016 and challenged for the IBF super-flyweight title in 2017. He is the older brother of professional boxer Michael Conlan.

== Amateur career ==
Conlan started boxing at the St John Bosco Boxing Club in Belfast, and represented Northern Ireland and Ireland at international level. He was initially coached by his father and Sean McCafferty, a former Olympian. At 13 years of age, he had his first competitive fight, marking the start of a successful amateur career. Conlan went on to win numerous domestic titles, including five All-Ireland junior titles, one National under-21 title, and one All-Ireland senior title. He also won three gold medals and one silver medal in the annual Four Nations Championship, contested by fighters from Ireland, Scotland, England and Wales. Conlan turned professional with an amateur record of 11 losses in 118 fights.

== Professional career ==
=== Conlan vs. Alfadli ===
Conlan turned professional in 2009. His first bout came against British fighter Anwar Alfadli, who he defeated on points.

=== Conlan vs. Smoes ===
In April 2014, he acquired the WBO European super-flyweight title with a victory over Benjamin Smoes at the Odyssey Arena in Belfast. Conlan outclassed the Belgian fighter and knocked him down in the sixth, before an inevitable seventh-round knockout.

=== Conlan vs. Estrella ===
In September, he defeated Mexico's Jose Estrella to capture the WBO Inter-Continental title.

In 2015, Conlan announced he would be leaving Belfast and longtime trainer John Breen to train under Danny Vaughan out of Macklin's Gym Marbella.

=== Conlan vs. Ancajas ===
On November 18, 2017, Conlan fought Jerwin Ancajas for the IBF super flyweight title. Ancajas defeated Conlan via a sixth round TKO.

In March 2020, Conlan was named vice president of boxing management company MTK Global.

== Personal life ==
Conlan's brother Michael is also a professional boxer and a former European and World amateur champion for Ireland. Their father, John, is from Drimnagh, County Dublin.

== Professional boxing record ==
20 fights	19 wins	1 loss
By knockout	11	1
By decision	8	0

No.	Result	Record	Opponent	Type	Round, time	Date	Location	Notes
20	Loss	19–1	(Philippines) Jerwin Ancajas	TKO	6 (12), 0:52	18 Nov 2017	(United Kingdom) SSE Arena, Belfast, Northern Ireland	For IBF super-flyweight title
19	Win	19–0	(Nicaragua) Yader Cardoza	SD	12	10 Mar 2017	(United Kingdom) Waterfront Hall, Belfast, Northern Ireland	Won vacant WBC Silver International super-flyweight title
18	Win	18–0	(Hungary) David Koos	PTS	8	5 Nov 2016	(United Kingdom) Titanic Exhibition Centre, Belfast, Northern Ireland	
17	Win	17–0	(Czech Republic) Patrik Bartos	TKO	2 (8), 0:56	16 Jul 2016	(United Kingdom) Ice Arena Wales, Cardiff, Wales	
16	Win	16–0	(United Kingdom) Anthony Nelson	KO	8 (12), 0:40	30 Apr 2016	(United Kingdom) Copper Box Arena, London, England	Won Commonwealth super-flyweight title
15	Win	15–0	(Argentina) Adrian Dimas Garzon	KO	4 (8), 1:57	7 Nov 2015	(Republic of Ireland) National Stadium, Dublin, Ireland	
14	Win	14–0	(Mexico) Junior Granados	UD	10	4 Jul 2015	(Republic of Ireland) National Stadium, Dublin, Ireland	Retained WBO Inter-Continental super-flyweight title
13	Win	13–0	(Mexico) Jose Estrella	UD	10	6 Sep 2014	(United Kingdom) Titanic Quarter, Belfast, Northern Ireland	Won WBO Inter-Continental super-flyweight title
12	Win	12–0	(Hungary) Gabor Molnar	TKO	3 (10), 1:58	20 Jun 2014	(United Kingdom) Waterfront Hall, Belfast, Northern Ireland	Retained WBO European super-flyweight title
11	Win	11–0	(Belgium) Benjamin Smoes	TKO	7 (10), 0:23	4 Apr 2014	(United Kingdom) Odyssey Arena, Belfast, Northern Ireland	Won vacant WBO European super-flyweight title
10	Win	10–0	(Argentina) Walter Rojas	TKO	1 (10), 1:51	19 Oct 2013	(United Kingdom) Odyssey Arena, Belfast, Northern Ireland	
9	Win	9–0	(United Kingdom) Mike Robinson	TKO	10 (10), 2:46	9 Feb 2013	(United Kingdom) Odyssey Arena, Belfast, Northern Ireland	
8	Win	8–0	(Slovakia) Elemir Rafael	PTS	6	21 Jan 2012	(United Kingdom) Liverpool Olympia, Liverpool, England	
7	Win	7–0	(United Kingdom) Delroy Spencer	PTS	6	25 Jun 2011	(United Kingdom) Leisure Centre, Craigavon, Northern Ireland	
6	Win	6–0	(United Kingdom) Kyle King	KO	3 (4), 1:31	13 May 2011	(United Kingdom) Medway Park Sports Centre, Gillingham, England	
5	Win	5–0	(United Kingdom) Francis Croes	RTD	3 (4), 3:00	15 Dec 2010	(United Kingdom) King's Hall, Belfast, Northern Ireland	
4	Win	4–0	(Bulgaria) Hyusein Hyuseinov	TKO	3 (4), 1:54	18 Sep 2010	(United Kingdom) Ulster Hall, Belfast, Northern Ireland	
3	Win	3–0	(United Kingdom) Deleon Spencer	PTS	4	11 Jun 2010	(United Kingdom) King's Hall, Belfast, Northern Ireland	
2	Win	2–0	(Bulgaria) Itsko Veselinov	TKO	5 (8), 0:32	13 Feb 2010	(Republic of Ireland) National Stadium, Dublin, Ireland	
1	Win	1–0	(United Kingdom) Anwar Alfadli	PTS	4	6 Nov 2009	(United Kingdom) Odyssey Arena, Belfast, Northern Ireland	
