= Kohei Kono =

Japanese boxer (born 1980)

Kohei Kono 河野公平
Personal information
- Nickname: The Tough Boy
- Nationality: Japanese
- Born: November 23, 1980 (age 45) Tokyo, Japan
- Height: 5 ft 5 1/2 in (166 cm)
- Weight: Super flyweight

Boxing career
- Reach: 67 1/2 in (171 cm)
- Stance: Orthodox

Boxing record
- Total fights: 46
- Wins: 33
- Win by KO: 14
- Losses: 12
- Draws: 1

Kohei Kono (河野公平, Kōno Kōhei) (born November 23, 1980) is a Japanese professional boxer. He is a two-time world champion, having held the WBA super-flyweight title twice between 2012 and 2016 with three successful defenses.

== Professional career ==
=== Kono vs. Niita ===
Kono made his professional debut at the Korakuen Hall in November 2000, losing on points to Toshiaki Niita.

He had little amateur experience before his professional debut. However, Kono was able to win 17 of his first 20 pro bouts, steadily climbing up the rankings.

=== Kono vs. Kikui ===
Kono's first title fight would be for the Japanese super flyweight title against Teppei Kikui in February 2007. Kono won the fight and the national title by unanimous decision (98-93, 97-93, 97-94).

=== Kono vs. Sonsona ===
He then won the OPBF super flyweight title against Eden Sonsona by split decision (118-110, 115-113, 113-115).

=== Kono vs. Nashiro ===
In September 2008, Kono fought Nobuo Nashiro for the vacant WBA (Regular) super flyweight world title. Nashiro had previously held the WBA title. In a close, contested fight, he would reclaim the belt, beating Kono by split decision (115-114, 115-114, 114-115). After the fight, Kono said ""I was able to keep my own rhythm and I thought I won. I think I hit some good punches. I did my best, but I must accept the result."

=== Kono vs. Rojas ===
Kono once again fought for a vacant world title, facing Tomás Rojas for the WBC super flyweight title. This time Kono lost a wide unanimous decision (111-116, 111-116, 109-118), despite dropping Rojas in the final round. Kono's career suffered more setbacks, dropping decisions to Yota Sato and Yohei Tobe following his loss to Rojas.

=== Kono vs. Kokietgym ===
Kono captured the WBA super flyweight title in his third world title shot against Thailand's Tepparith Kokietgym via fourth round knockout. at the Ota-City General Gymnasium in Tokyo on December 31, 2012. Kono dropped the Thai champion three times during round 4. The result was considered an upset. Yota Sato, who held the WBC title expressed interest in rematching Kono in a unification bout.

=== Kono vs. Solis ===
Kono would lose his title in his first defense, dropping a majority decision (113-113, 112-114, 111-115) to Liborio Solís in a fight where both fighters traded knockdowns.

=== Kono vs. Kaovichit ===
After Solís lost his title due to being unable to make weight in his next fight, Kono faced Denkaosan Kaovichit for the vacant WBA title. Denkaosan went down in round 4, but was ahead on the scorecards before Kono knocked him out in round 8 with a cross.

=== Kono vs. Jimenez ===
Kono's first defense saw him fight to a split draw against Norbelto Jimenez.

=== Kono vs. Kameda ===
He then fought Kōki Kameda at the UIC Pavilion in Chicago. In a scrappy brawl that saw both fighters lose points on the scorecards due to fouls, Kono retained his title, dropping Kameda in round 2 en route to winning a unanimous decision (115-109, 113-111, 116-108).

=== Kono vs. Concepcion ===
Kono would lose his title in a unification bout against the WBA's interim champion Luis Concepción. Kono lost the fight by controversial decision (113-115, 112-116, 112-116).

=== Kono vs. Inoue ===
Kono challenged WBO super flyweight champion Naoya Inoue in December 2016. Inoue stopped Kono in a commanding performance. Kono was dropped once by a left hook from Inoue before being stopped in the sixth round. This was the first time Kono lost a fight due to stoppage.

=== Kono vs. Tso ===
In October 2017, Kono faced Rex Tso. Tso had sought to fight Kono while the latter was still a world champion, but was unable to draw him into the ring. After six rounds, Tso was unable to continue due to swelling around his eye. Nevertheless, Tso remained unbeaten by winning a technical decision.

=== Kono vs. Moloney ===
In his next bout, Kono faced Jason Moloney, ranked 4# by the WBA, #5 by the WBO, #11 by the IBF and #13 by the WBC at bantamweight. Moloney managed to win the fight via a sixth round retirement.

== Professional boxing record ==
46 fights	33 wins	12 losses
By knockout	14	2
By decision	19	10
Draws	1	

No.	Result	Record	Opponent	Type	Round, time	Date	Location	Notes
46	Loss	33–12–1	Jason Moloney	RTD	6 (12), 3:00	May 19, 2018	Town Hall, Malvern, Australia	For WBA Oceania bantamweight title
45	Loss	33–11–1	Rex Tso	TD	7 (12)	Oct 7, 2017	Convention and Exhibition Centre, Hong Kong, S.A.R.	For WBO International super-flyweight title
44	Win	33–10–1	Rambo Sithsaithong	TKO	5 (8), 1:35	Jul 23, 2017	Ota City General Gymnasium, Tokyo, Japan	
43	Loss	32–10–1	Naoya Inoue	KO	6 (12), 1:01	Dec 30, 2016	Ariake Coliseum, Tokyo, Japan	For WBO super-flyweight title
42	Loss	32–9–1	Luis Concepción	UD	12	Aug 31, 2016	Ota City General Gymnasium, Tokyo, Japan	Lost WBA super-flyweight title
41	Win	32–8–1	Tanawat Phonnaku	UD	12	Apr 27, 2016	Ota City General Gymnasium, Tokyo, Japan	Retained WBA super-flyweight title
40	Win	31–8–1	Kōki Kameda	UD	12	Oct 16, 2015	UIC Pavilion, Chicago, Illinois, U.S.	Retained WBA super-flyweight title
39	Draw	30–8–1	Norbelto Jimenez	SD	12	Dec 31, 2014	Ota City General Gymnasium, Tokyo, Japan	Retained WBA super-flyweight title
38	Win	30–8	Denkaosan Kaovichit	KO	8 (12), 0:50	Mar 26, 2014	Korakuen Hall, Tokyo, Japan	Won vacant WBA super-flyweight title
37	Win	29–8	Dawut Manopkanchang	TKO	3 (8), 0:50	Dec 31, 2013	Ota City General Gymnasium, Tokyo, Japan	
36	Loss	28–8	Liborio Solís	MD	12	May 6, 2013	Ota City General Gymnasium, Tokyo, Japan	Lost WBA super-flyweight title
35	Win	28–7	Tepparith Singwancha	KO	4 (12), 2:08	Dec 31, 2012	Ota City General Gymnasium, Tokyo, Japan	Won WBA super-flyweight title
34	Win	27–7	Petchbarngborn Kokietgym	UD	8	Sep 10, 2012	Korakuen Hall, Tokyo, Japan	
33	Win	26–7	Yusaku Ishikawa	TKO	5 (8), 1:14	Mar 31, 2012	Korakuen Hall, Tokyo, Japan	
32	Loss	25–7	Yohei Tobe	UD	8	Oct 10, 2011	Korakuen Hall, Tokyo, Japan	
31	Loss	25–6	Yota Sato	UD	10	Apr 9, 2011	Korakuen Hall, Tokyo, Japan	For Japanese super-flyweight title
30	Loss	25–5	Tomás Rojas	UD	12	Sep 20, 2010	Super Arena, Saitama, Japan	For vacant WBC super-flyweight title
29	Win	25–4	Masafumi Tonomura	TKO	11 (12), 2:28	May 17, 2010	Super Arena, Saitama, Japan	Retained OPBF super-flyweight title
28	Win	24–4	Marvin Tampus	UD	12	Oct 3, 2009	Korakuen Hall, Tokyo, Japan	Retained OPBF super-flyweight title
27	Win	23–4	Daniel Ferreras	UD	12	May 2, 2009	Korakuen Hall, Tokyo, Japan	Won vacant OPBF super-flyweight title
26	Win	22–4	Hendrik Barongsay	TKO	6 (10), 2:28	Feb 7, 2009	Korakuen Hall, Tokyo, Japan	
25	Loss	21–4	Nobuo Nashiro	SD	12	Sep 15, 2008	Pacifico, Yokohama, Japan	For vacant WBA super-flyweight title
24	Win	21–3	Kuniyuki Aizawa	UD	12	Feb 16, 2008	Korakuen Hall, Tokyo, Japan	Retained OPBF and Japanese super-flyweight titles
23	Win	20–3	Eden Sonsona	SD	12	Oct 6, 2007	Korakuen Hall, Tokyo, Japan	Won vacant OPBF super-flyweight title
22	Win	19–3	Kenji Saegusa	TD	9 (10), 1:05	Jun 2, 2007	Korakuen Hall, Tokyo, Japan	Retained Japanese super-flyweight title
21	Win	18–3	Teppei Kikui	UD	10	Feb 12, 2007	Korakuen Hall, Tokyo, Japan	Won Japanese super-flyweight title
20	Win	17–3	Saichon Or Ounsuwon	TKO	6 (8), 2:41	Sep 4, 2006	Korakuen Hall, Tokyo, Japan	
19	Win	16–3	Prosper Matsuura	TKO	9 (10), 1:50	Feb 11, 2006	Korakuen Hall, Tokyo, Japan	
18	Win	15–3	Petchdam Sithsaithong	KO	2 (10), 1:07	Oct 24, 2005	Korakuen Hall, Tokyo, Japan	
17	Loss	14–3	Teppei Kikui	UD	8	Jul 16, 2005	Korakuen Hall, Tokyo, Japan	
16	Win	14–2	Kyohei Wada	UD	8	Feb 1, 2005	Korakuen Hall, Tokyo, Japan	
15	Win	13–2	Munetake Egawa	SD	8	Aug 25, 2004	Korakuen Hall, Tokyo, Japan	
14	Win	12–2	Kengo Wakao	TKO	7 (10), 1:05	May 20, 2004	Korakuen Hall, Tokyo, Japan	
13	Win	11–2	Asahi Takano	UD	8	Feb 5, 2004	Korakuen Hall, Tokyo, Japan	
12	Win	10–2	Teppei Kikui	SD	8	Nov 4, 2003	Korakuen Hall, Tokyo, Japan	
11	Win	9–2	Makoto Horinouchi	TKO	2 (6), 2:54	Jun 26, 2003	Korakuen Hall, Tokyo, Japan	
10	Loss	8–2	Daigo Nakahiro	UD	6	Dec 22, 2002	Korakuen Hall, Tokyo, Japan	
9	Win	8–1	Kenji Saegusa	UD	6	Nov 9, 2002	Korakuen Hall, Tokyo, Japan	
8	Win	7–1	Yuichiro Komuro	UD	6	Sep 26, 2002	Korakuen Hall, Tokyo, Japan	
7	Win	6–1	Yuki Kishi	UD	6	Aug 2, 2002	Korakuen Hall, Tokyo, Japan	
6	Win	5–1	Kosuke Takamizawa	TKO	4 (4), 1:54	May 31, 2002	Korakuen Hall, Tokyo, Japan	
5	Win	4–1	Ryoji Arai	KO	1 (4), 2:07	Jan 28, 2002	Korakuen Hall, Tokyo, Japan	
4	Win	3–1	Yosuke Ishiwatari	UD	4	Sep 26, 2001	Bunka Gym, Yokohama, Japan	
3	Win	2–1	Takaaki Hayashi	UD	4	Jun 19, 2001	Korakuen Hall, Tokyo, Japan	
2	Win	1–1	Kazuya Hirata	UD	4	Apr 18, 2001	Japan	
1	Loss	0–1	Toshiaki Nitta	MD	4	Nov 22, 2000	Korakuen Hall, Tokyo, Japan	

== See also ==
- Boxing in Japan
- List of Japanese boxing world champions
- List of world super-flyweight boxing champions

Sporting positions
Regional boxing titles
Preceded by Teppei Kikui	Japanese super-flyweight champion February 12, 2007 – July 2008; Vacated	Vacant Title next held by Daigo Nakahiro
Vacant Title last held by Kuniyuki Aizawa	OPBF super-flyweight champion October 6, 2007 – July 2008; Vacated	Vacant Title next held by Konosuke Tomiyama
Vacant Title last held by Konosuke Tomiyama	OPBF super-flyweight champion May 2, 2009 – July 2010; Vacated	Vacant Title next held by Takuya Kogawa
World boxing titles
Preceded by Tepparith Singwancha	WBA super-flyweight champion December 31, 2012 – May 6, 2013	Succeeded by Liborio Solís
Vacant Title last held by Liborio Solís	WBA super-flyweight champion March 26, 2014 – August 31, 2016	Succeeded by Luis Concepción
