= Liborio Solís =

Venezuelan boxer

Personal information
- Nickname: La Maquinita
- Born: Liborio Solís Marturet; 21 March 1982 (age 44) Maracay, Venezuela
- Height: 5 ft 4 in (163 cm)
- Weight: Super flyweight; Bantamweight

Boxing career
- Reach: 69 1/2 in (177 cm)
- Stance: Orthodox

Boxing record
- Total fights: 48
- Wins: 37
- Win by KO: 18
- Losses: 9
- Draws: 1
- No contests: 1

Liborio Solís (born 21 March 1982) is a Venezuelan professional boxer who held WBA super flyweight title in 2013. He also challenged once for the WBC bantamweight title in 2016 and three times for the WBA bantamweight title in 2016, 2017, and 2023.

== Professional career ==
=== Solis vs. Salgado ===
On 10 December 2011, Solís defeated José Salgado by twelfth round split decision for the interim WBA Super Flyweight title.

=== Solis vs. Kono ===
On 6 May 2013, Solis defeated Kohei Kono by twelfth round majority decision to win the WBA Super Flyweight title.

=== Solis vs. Kameda ===
Solís then fought Daiki Kameda in a unification bout where both Solis's WBA Super Flyweight title and Kameda's IBF Super Flyweight title were on the line. However, Solis failed to make weight, meaning he lost his WBA World title on the scales. Both titles were at stake for Kameda only, but even if he lost, he would still retain his IBF title. Solis won the bout by split decision.

=== Solis vs. Rigondeaux ===
Rigondeaux beat Liborio Solis by split decision in their 12 round contest on 8 February 2020, at PPL Center in Pennsylvania for the vacant WBA bantamweight championship of the world. The scorecards read 112-115, 116-111, 115-112 in favor of winner Rigondeaux.

== Professional boxing record ==
48 fights	37 wins	9 losses
By knockout	18	0
By decision	19	9
Draws	1	
No contests	1	

No.	Result	Record	Opponent	Type	Round, time	Date	Location	Notes
48	Loss	37–9–1 (1)	Arnold Khegai	UD	8	12 Sep 2025	Uber Eats Music Hall, Berlin, Germany	
47	Loss	37–8–1 (1)	Hector Andres Sosa	UD	10	17 May 2025	Centro de Entrenamiento Atheyna Bylon, Panama City, Panama	
46	Win	37–7–1 (1)	Jeison Prado	RTD	3 (8), 3:00	14 Jul 2023	Gimnasio Eliecer Otaiza, Caracas, Venezuela	
45	Win	36–7–1 (1)	Angel Fernandez	TKO	2 (8), 1:13	30 Jun 2023	Gimnasio Vertical El Dorado, Caracas, Venezuela	
44	Loss	35–7–1 (1)	Takuma Inoue	UD	12	8 Apr 2023	Ariake Arena, Ariake, Tokyo, Japan	For vacant WBA bantamweight title
43	Win	35–6–1 (1)	Luis Carrillo	TKO	2 (8), 2:26	27 Nov 2022	Gimnasio Eliecer Otaiza, Caracas, Venezuela	
42	Win	34–6–1 (1)	Adrien Mejias	TKO	2 (6), 1:22	1 Apr 2022	Centro Recreacional Yesterday, Turmero, Venezuela	
41	Win	33–6–1 (1)	Alejandro Jair Gonzalez	UD	10	23 Mar 2022	Roberto Durán Arena, Panama City, Panama	Retained WBA Fedelatin Bantamweight Title
40	Win	32–6–1 (1)	Marlon Olea	UD	8	23 Jul 2021	Palacio Dorado, Panama City, Panama	
39	Win	31–6–1 (1)	Leosdan Nunez	TD	8 (11), 0:19	3 Jun 2021	Palacio Dorado, Panama City, Panama	Won WBA Fedelatin bantamweight title; Split TD after accidental head clash
38	Loss	30–6–1 (1)	Guillermo Rigondeaux	SD	12	8 Feb 2020	PPL Center, Allentown, Pennsylvania, U.S.	For vacant WBA (Regular) bantamweight title
37	Win	30–5–1 (1)	Karluis Diaz	KO	1 (8), 2:28	18 Jul 2019	Sociedad Española, Panama City, Panama	
36	Win	29–5–1 (1)	José Luis Bellorín	UD	8	23 Mar 2019	Centro Recreacional Yesterday, Turmero, Venezuela	
35	Win	28–5–1 (1)	Jonathan Arias	RTD	5 (8)	27 Nov 2018	Hotel El Panama, Panama City, Panama	
34	Win	27–5–1 (1)	José Alfaro	UD	6	11 Aug 2018	Gimnasio Luis Beltran Diaz, Maracay, Venezuela	
33	Win	26–5–1 (1)	José Ramos	KO	1 (8), 2:55	4 May 2018	Fantastic Casino de Albrook Mall, Panama City, Panama	
32	NC	25–5–1 (1)	Jamie McDonnell	NC	3 (12), 2:45	4 Nov 2017	Casino de Salle Medecin, Monte Carlo, Monaco	For WBA (Regular) bantamweight title; NC after McDonnell cut from accidental head clash
31	Loss	25–5–1	Jamie McDonnell	UD	12	12 Nov 2016	Salle des Etoiles, Monte Carlo, Monaco	For WBA (Regular) bantamweight title
30	Win	25–4–1	Freddy Beleno	UD	8	16 Jul 2016	Hotel Sheraton Bijao, Santa Clara, Panama	
29	Win	24–4–1	Juan Carlos Vega	TKO	5 (8), 0:31	25 Jun 2016	Centro Recreacional Yesterday, Turmero, Venezuela	
28	Loss	23–4–1	Shinsuke Yamanaka	UD	12	4 Mar 2016	Shimazu Arena, Kyoto, Japan	For WBC bantamweight title
27	Win	23–3–1	Jonathan Baat	UD	9	17 Dec 2015	Roberto Durán Arena, Panama City, Panama	Won vacant WBA Fedecaribe bantamweight title
26	Win	22–3–1	Yenrry Bermudez	UD	4	13 Nov 2015	Centro Recreacional Yesterday, Turmero, Venezuela	
25	Win	21–3–1	Alexander Espinoza	UD	10	3 Oct 2015	Centro Recreacional Yesterday, Turmero, Venezuela	
24	Win	20–3–1	Jonathan Burgos	KO	2 (8), 1:31	7 Aug 2015	Hotel Sortis, Panama City, Panama	
23	Win	19–3–1	Ronald Barrera	UD	10	4 Mar 2015	Fantastic Casino de Albrook Mall, Panama City, Panama	
22	Win	18–3–1	Jose Carlos Vargas	TKO	2 (8), 1:00	8 Aug 2014	Gimnasio Yuyin Luzcando, Panama City, Panama	
21	Win	17–3–1	Alex Olea	KO	1 (8), 3:00	15 Feb 2014	Hotel El Panama, Panama City, Panama	
20	Win	16–3–1	Daiki Kameda	SD	12	3 Dec 2013	Prefectural Gymnasium, Osaka, Japan	WBA and IBF super flyweight titles only at stake for Kameda as Solís misses weight
19	Win	15–3–1	Kohei Kono	MD	12	6 May 2013	Ota City General Gymnasium, Tokyo, Japan	Retained WBA super flyweight title
18	Win	14–3–1	Santiago Acosta	UD	12	28 Apr 2012	Coliseo El Limon, Maracay, Venezuela	Retained WBA super flyweight title
17	Win	13–3–1	José Salgado	SD	12	10 Dec 2011	El Palenque de la Feria, Tepic, Mexico	Won WBA interim super flyweight title
16	Win	12–3–1	Rafael Concepción	UD	11	22 Oct 2011	Roberto Durán Arena, Panama City, Panama	Retained WBA Fedelatin bantamweight title
15	Win	11–3–1	Ezequiel Asprilla	TKO	4 (8)	3 Jun 2011	Palacio Dorado, Panama City, Panama	
14	Win	10–3–1	Oswaldo Miranda	TKO	2 (11), 2:23	15 Apr 2011	Palacio Dorado, Panama City, Panama	Won vacant WBA Fedelatin bantamweight title
13	Loss	9–3–1	Ricardo Núñez	UD	8	1 Feb 2011	Hotel Veneto, Panama City, Panama	
12	Loss	9–2–1	Henry Maldonado	SD	9	25 Nov 2010	Pharaoh's Casino, Managua, Nicaragua	For vacant WBA Fedebol super flyweight title
11	Win	9–1–1	Jose Mena	UD	6	22 Apr 2010	Roberto Durán Arena, Panama City, Panama	
10	Win	8–1–1	Alejandro Corrales	KO	2 (6), 2:37	18 Mar 2010	Roberto Durán Arena, Panama City, Panama	
9	Win	7–1–1	Jose Jimenez	TKO	7 (12)	7 Nov 2009	Gimnasio José María Vargas, Vargas, Venezuela	Won vacant Venezuelan super flyweight title
8	Win	6–1–1	Iwier Henriquez	UD	6	18 Jul 2009	Gimnasio José María Vargas, Vargas, Venezuela	
7	Loss	5–1–1	Yenifel Vicente	UD	6	23 Aug 2008	Centro Bético Croes, Santa Cruz, Aruba	
6	Win	5–0–1	Alexander Gonzalez	UD	6	26 Nov 2007	Teatro Roxi, Maracaibo, Venezuela	
5	Win	4–0–1	Franklin Medina	TKO	6 (6)	8 Oct 2007	Teatro Roxi, Maracaibo, Venezuela	
4	Draw	3–0–1	Jose Ignacio Sanchez	TD	4 (6)	6 Jul 2002	Hilton Gran Salon, Caracas, Venezuela	
3	Win	3–0	Jose Arroyo	TKO	1 (4)	26 Mar 2001	Maracaibo, Venezuela	
2	Win	2–0	Miguel Acosta	UD	4	30 Jan 2001	Valle de la Pascua, Venezuela	
1	Win	1–0	Claudio Lopez	TKO	2 (4)	15 Dec 2000	Guarico, Venezuela	

== See also ==
- List of super-flyweight boxing champions

Sporting positions
World boxing titles
Vacant Title last held by Tepparith Singwancha	WBA super flyweight champion Interim title 10 December 2011 - 6 May 2013; Won full title	Vacant Title next held by Denkaosan Kaovichit
Preceded by Kohei Kono	WBA super flyweight champion 6 May 2013 - 2 December 2013; Stripped	Vacant Title next held by Kohei Kono
