= Daniel Diaz (boxer) =

Nicaraguan boxer

Daniel Diaz (born 20 January 1984) is a professional boxer from Nicaragua.

Diaz lost to Koki Kameda for the World Boxing Association bantamweight title.

Diaz defeated former world title challenger Roberto Marroquin. He also holds a win over Timur Shailezov.

Diaz has lost to Andrés Gutiérrez.
