= Hirofumi Mukai =

Japanese boxer (born 1985)

Personal information
- Nationality: Japanese
- Born: 4 December 1985 (age 40) Hirakata, Osaka, Japan
- Height: 5 ft 7.5 in (1.71 m)
- Weight: Flyweight; Super Flyweight; Bantamweight

Boxing career

Boxing record
- Total fights: 21
- Wins: 13
- Win by KO: 3
- Losses: 5
- Draws: 3

Hirofumi Mukai (向井 寛史, Mukai Hirofumi; born 4 December 1985) is a Japanese professional boxer. He was a 2 time world title challenger.

== Professional career ==
Mukai challenged Pongsaklek Wonjongkam with the WBC Flyweight title on the line on 23 December 2011, but the fight ended in a first round technical draw, so Wonjongkam retained the title.

Mukai holds wins over former world champion Sonny Boy Jaro who was the WBC, The Ring and Lineal Flyweight World Champion, as well as world title contender.

Mukai faced champion Srisaket Sor Rungvisai on 15 November 2013 with the WBC Super Flyweight title on the line, but lost when his corner threw in the towel in the ninth of twelve rounds.

In November 2016, Hirofumi Mukai defeated world title contender Tanawat Phonnaku to claim Tso’s vacated WBO Asia-Pacific Junior Bantamweight title.

On 11 March 2017, he lost the WBO Asia-Pacific title to Rex Tso.

== Professional boxing record ==
13 Wins (3 knockout, 10 decisions), 5 Losses, 3 Draws
Res.	Record	Opponent	Type	Rd., Time	Date	Location	Notes
Loss	13-5-3	(Hong Kong) Rex Tso	TKO	8 (12)	2015-09-16	Convention and Exhibition Centre, Hong Kong, SAR	Lost WBO Asia Pacific super-flyweight title; For WBC Asian Boxing Council and WBO International super-flyweight titles
Win	13-4-3	(Thailand) Tanawat Phonnaku	TKO	2	2016-11-23	Sumiyoshi SportsCenter, Osaka, Osaka, Japan, Osaka	Won vacant WBO Asia-Pacific super flyweight title
Draw	12-4-3	(Japan) Ryotaro Kawabata	TD	3	2016-07-31	Satsukiyama Gym, Ikeda, Osaka, Japan	
Win	12-4-2	(Japan) Toshikuni Wake	TKO	7	2016-03-20	Sumiyoshi SportsCenter, Osaka, Osaka, Japan, Osaka	
Loss	11-4-2	(Japan) Shohei Omori	TKO	6 (10), 1:37	2015-09-16	(Japan) Shimazu Arena, Kyoto	For Japanese bantamweight title
Win	11-3-2	(Japan) Konosuke Tomiyama	UD	8	2015-04-19	(Japan) Sumiyoshi Ward Center, Osaka	
Win	10-3-2	(Philippines) Marjohn Yap	UD	8	2014-08-03	(Japan) Sumiyoshi Ward Center, Osaka	
Draw	9-3-2	(Japan) Myung Ho Lee	SD	8	2014-03-30	(Japan) IMP Hall, Osaka	
Loss	9-3-1	(Thailand) Srisaket Sor Rungvisai	TKO	9 (12), 1:44	2013-11-15	(Thailand) Provincial Stadium, Nakhon Ratchasima	For WBC super-flyweight title
Win	9-2-1	(South Korea) Bum-Young Lee	UD	6	2013-08-23	(Thailand) Siam Park, Bangkok	
Loss	8-2-1	(Philippines) Mark Anthony Geraldo	KO	2 (10), 3:04	2013-04-07	(Japan) Sumiyoshi Ward Center, Osaka	
Win	8-1-1	(Thailand) Saenmuangloei Kokietgym	UD	8	2012-09-01	(Japan) Sumiyoshi SportsCenter, Osaka	
Win	7-1-1	(Thailand) Witcharapol Kiatprapat	UD	6	2012-06-10	(Japan) Sumiyoshi Ward Center, Osaka	
Win	6-1-1	(Thailand) Khunkhiri Wor Wisaruth	TKO	5 (8), 1:14	2012-04-15	(Japan) Sumiyoshi Ward Center, Osaka	
Draw	5-1-1	(Thailand) Pongsaklek Wonjongkam	TD	1 (12), 0:47	2011-12-23	(Thailand) 11th Inf Reg, Bangkok	For WBC and The Ring flyweight titles
Loss	5-1	(Philippines) Rocky Fuentes	UD	12	2011-08-20	(Japan) Sumiyoshi Ward Center, Osaka	For OPBF flyweight title
Win	5-0	(Philippines) Sonny Boy Jaro	UD	10	2011-02-05	(Japan) Osaka Prefectural Gymnasium, Osaka	
Win	4-0	(Indonesia) Anis Ceunfin	UD	8	2010-10-11	(Japan) Sumiyoshi Ward Center, Osaka	
Win	3-0	(South Korea) Jin-Man Jeon	UD	8	2010-05-08	(Japan) Osaka Prefectural Gymnasium, Osaka	
Win	2-0	(Japan) Kenta Omae	UD	6	2009-09-30	(Japan) Osaka Prefectural Gymnasium, Osaka	
Win	1-0	(Japan) Toru Uemura	MD	6	2009-08-01	(Japan) Sumiyoshi Ward Center, Osaka	
