= Santiago Acosta =

Argentine boxer

Personal information
- Nickname: "El Vendaval"
- Nationality: Argentina
- Born: Santiago Iván Acosta; 6 July 1979 (age 47) La Plata, Buenos Aires Province
- Weight: Flyweight

Boxing career
- Stance: Orthodox

Boxing record
- Total fights: 28
- Wins: 17
- Win by KO: 7
- Losses: 9
- Draws: 2
- No contests: 0
Medal record
Representing Argentina
Men's Boxing
South American Games
Silver medal – second place	2002 Belém	Flyweight

Santiago Iván Acosta (born 4 July 1979) is an Argentine flyweight boxer. He is nicknamed "El Vendaval". As an amateur Acosta competed for his native country at the 2003 Pan American Games in Santo Domingo, Dominican Republic, where he was stopped in the second round of the men's flyweight division (– 51 kg) by Mexico's eventual bronze medalist Raúl Hilares. Acosta made his professional debut on 21 April 2004, against Juan Manuel Altamirano.

== Professional career ==
On 4 April 2012, Acosta loss against Liborio Solis on a twelve-round unanimous decision

== Professional boxing record ==
17 Wins (7 knockouts), 9 Loss, 2 Draws
Res.	Record	Opponent	Type	Rd.,Time	Date	Location	Notes
Loss	17-9-2	(Venezuela) Liborio Solis	UD	12	2012-04-28	Coliseo El Limon, Maracay, Venezuela	For interim WBA World super flyweight title.
Loss	17-8-2	(Argentina) Roberto Domingo Sosa	UD	6 (6)	2011-06-11	Luna Park, Buenos Aires, Argentina	
Win	17-7-2	(Argentina) Carlos Alberto Rodriguez	UD	6 (6)	2011-04-01	La Plata, Buenos Aires, Argentina	
Loss	16-7-2	(Argentina) Sebastian Daniel Rodriguez	UD	6 (6)	2011-01-29	Polideportivo Municipal, Monte Hermoso, Buenos Aires, Argentina	
Loss	16-6-2	(Argentina) Sebastian Daniel Rodriguez	SD	6 (6)	2010-10-15	Unidad Turística, Embalse Río Tercero, Cordoba, Argentina	
Loss	16-5-2	(Argentina) Omar Andres Narvaez	UD	10 (10)	2010-02-24	Socios Fundadores, Comodoro Rivadavia, Chubut, Argentina	
Loss	16-4–2	(Argentina) Roberto Domingo Sosa	SD	12 (12)	2009-11-06	Estadio Delmi, Salta, Salta, Argentina	
Loss	16-3-2	(Mexico) Jesus Jimenez	KO	4 (12)	2009-06-26	(Mexico) Salon Marbet Plus, Ciudad Nezahualcoyotl, México	For vacant WBO Latino flyweight title.
Loss	16-2-2	(Panama) Luis Concepcion	UD	11 (11)	2009-02-19	Atlapa Convention Centre, Panama City, Panama	For WBA Fedelatin flyweight title.
Win	16-1-2	(Argentina) Carlos Eduardo Bulacio	UD	10 (10)	2008-12-06	Club Social y Deportivo San Vicente, Bell Ville, Cordoba, Argentina	
