= Timur Shailezov =

Kyrgyzstani boxer

Timur Shailezov (born 25 January 1980) is a professional boxer from Kyrgyzstan.

Shailezov defeated Leon Moore to win the North American Boxing Association (NABA) bantamweight title. He lost the title in his first defense to Daniel Diaz.

Shailezov defeated Ricardo Molina to win the NABA super flyweight title.

He has also lost to Zhanat Zhakiyanov, Rex Tso, Luis Yanez, and Iván Morales.
