= Rex Tso =

Hong Kong boxer (born 1987)

Rex Tso Sing-yu
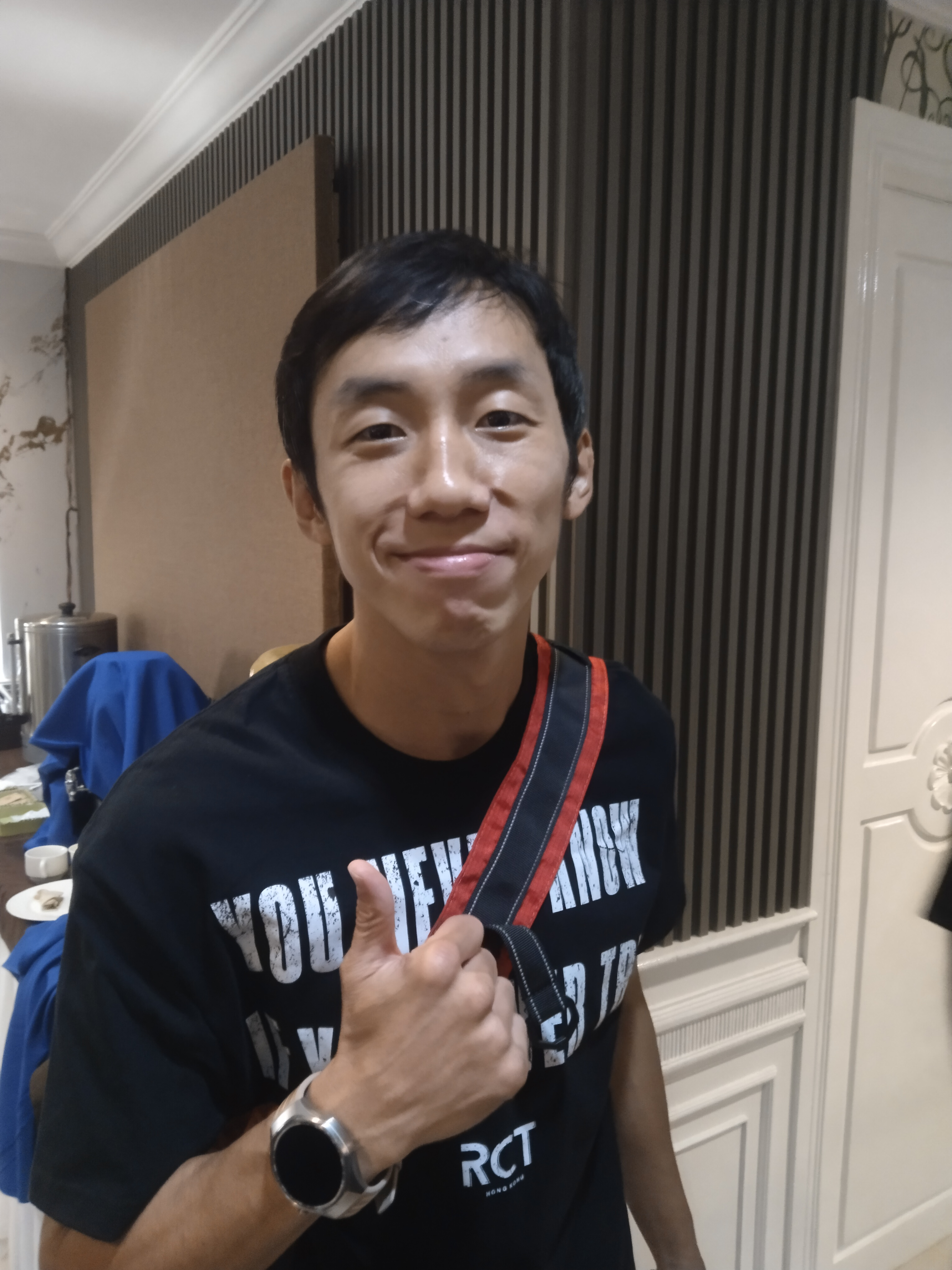
- Rex Tso in 2025

Personal information
- Nickname: The Wonder Kid
- Nationality: Hong Konger
- Born: July 15, 1987 (age 39) Tuen Mun, British Hong Kong
- Height: 5 ft 7 in (170 cm)
- Weight: Super flyweight; Bantamweight

Boxing career
- Reach: 177 cm (70 in)
- Stance: southpaw

Boxing record
- Total fights: 25
- Wins: 24
- Win by KO: 15
- Draws: 1

Rex Tso Sing-yu (in Chinese): 曹星如; born 15 July 1987) is a Hong Kong professional boxer. He has won several regional titles at super-flyweight and has been ranked in the world top 10 by the WBO.

== Professional career ==
Tso won the WBC Asia Continental Super Flyweight title in December 2012 in a bruising 12-round contest against Timur Shailezov of Kyrgyzstan, stopping his opponent in the 10th round.

He then captured the WBO Asia-Pacific Junior Bantamweight title against Mako Matsuyama in February 2014, winning by TKO in the 8th round of the 10-round contest.

Tso then added the WBA International Super Flyweight title to his collection after defeating Michael Enriquez in March 2015.

On May 14, 2016, Tso faced Young Gil-bae. Tso made easy work out of the South Korean veteran, dominating the whole fight before stopping him in the fourth round.

He then captured the WBC Asia Super Flyweight title against Brad Hore in August 2015 and the WBO International Junior Bantamweight title against Ryuto Maekawa in October 2016.

On March 11, 2017, he successfully defended his WBO International and WBC Asian Boxing Council titles and claimed the WBO Asia-Pacific title against Hirofumi Mukai. Tso battered Mukai and dropped him twice before finishing him with a left to the body in the 8th round. With the win, Tso improved his record to 21–0.

In October 2017, Tso faced former WBA world champion Kohei Kono. Tso had sought to fight Kono while the latter a world champion, but was unable to draw him into the ring. After six rounds, Tso was unable to continue due to swelling around his eye. Nevertheless, Tso remained unbeaten by winning a technical decision.

=== Thrilla in Manila II Countdown ===
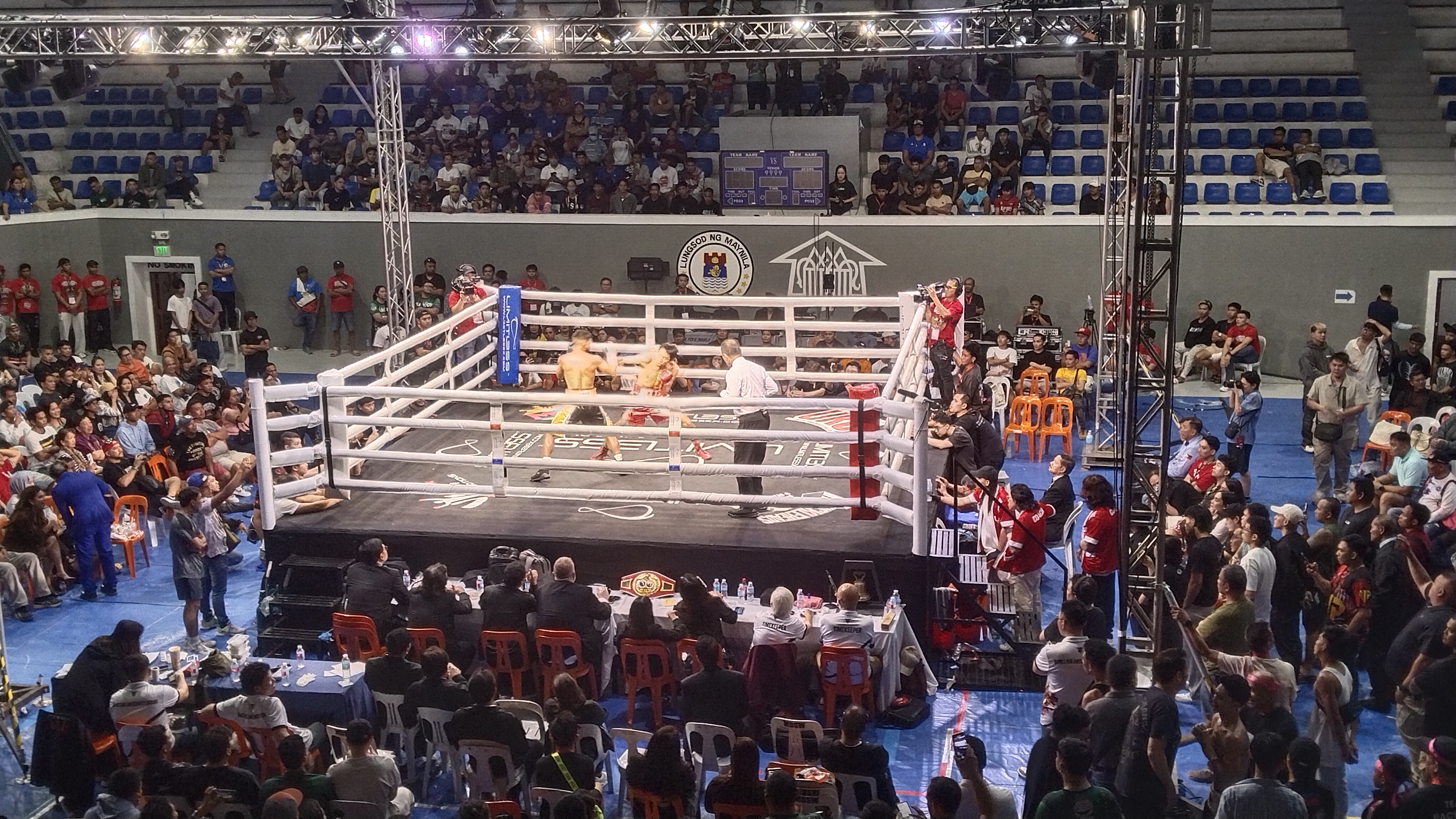
Match venue at San Andres Complex between Rex Tso (right) and Sagar Chouchan (left) in 2025.

October 26, 2025, In an early boxing event dedicated as the 50th Year Anniversary of the historic Thrilla in Manila between Muhammad Ali and Joe Frazier. Co-featured bout, Rex Tso will face India's Sagar Chouhan for the ten-round bout in what will be Tso's second fight since ending an eight-year sabbatical from the pro ranks earlier this year at the San Andres Sports Complex in Manila.

== Professional boxing record ==
25 fights	24 wins	0 losses
By knockout	15	0
By decision	9	0
Draws	1	

No.	Result	Record	Opponent	Type	Round, time	Date	Location	Notes
25	Win	24–0–1	Genisis Libranza	TKO	3 (10), 1:44	Feb 28, 2026	The Flash Grand Ballroom of the Elorde Sports Complex, Parañaque, Philippines	Won vacant IBF Pan Pacific bantamweight title
24	Draw	23–0–1	Sagar Chouchan	TD	2 (10), 2:49	Oct 26, 2025	San Andres Sports Complex, Manila, Philippines	For vacant IBF Pan Pacific bantamweight title; TD: Chouhan unable to continue due to severe cut
23	Win	23–0	Vergilio Silvano	KO	5 (6), 0:42	Aug 24, 2025	The Flash Grand Ballroom of the Elorde Sports Complex, Parañaque, Philippines	
22	Win	22–0	Kohei Kono	TD	7 (12)	Oct 7, 2017	Convention and Exhibition Centre, Wan Chai, Hong Kong	Retained WBO International super-flyweight title; Unanimous TD after Tso sustained swelling from an accidental head clash
21	Win	21–0	Hirofumi Mukai	KO	8 (12), 0:37	Mar 11, 2017	Convention and Exhibition Centre, Wan Chai, Hong Kong	Retained WBC–ABCO and WBO International super-flyweight titles; Won WBO Asia Pacific super-flyweight title
20	Win	20–0	Ryuto Maekawa	UD	10	Oct 8, 2016	Convention and Exhibition Centre, Wan Chai, Hong Kong	Retained WBC–ABCO super-flyweight title; Won vacant WBO International super-flyweight title
19	Win	19–0	Young Gil-bae	TKO	4 (12), 2:57	May 14, 2016	Convention and Exhibition Centre, Wan Chai, Hong Kong	Retained WBC–ABCO super-flyweight title; Won vacant WBO Asia Pacific super-flyweight title
18	Win	18–0	Bradley Hore	TKO	7 (10), 2:57	Aug 29, 2015	Convention and Exhibition Centre, Wan Chai, Hong Kong	Won vacant WBC–ABCO super-flyweight title
17	Win	17–0	Phum Kunmat	TKO	4 (8), 2:55	Jul 18, 2015	Cotai Arena, Macau, SAR	
16	Win	16–0	Michael Enriquez	UD	10	Mar 7, 2015	Cotai Arena, Macau, SAR	Won vacant WBA International super-flyweight title
15	Win	15–0	Espinos Sabu	UD	8	Nov 23, 2014	Cotai Arena, Macau, SAR	
14	Win	14–0	John Bajawa	TKO	5 (8), 0:48	Jul 19, 2014	Cotai Arena, Macau, SAR	
13	Win	13–0	Nattaphong Panpaew	UD	10	May 31, 2014	Cotai Arena, Macau, SAR	Retained WBO Asia Pacific super-flyweight title
12	Win	12–0	Mako Matsuyama	TKO	8 (10), 1:27	Feb 22, 2014	Cotai Arena, Macau, SAR	Retained WBC–ABCO Continental super-flyweight title; Won vacant WBO Asia Pacific super-flyweight title
11	Win	11–0	Chaloemchai Khrithammarat	TKO	1 (6), 2:29	Nov 24, 2013	Cotai Arena, Macau, SAR	
10	Win	10–0	Rusalee Samor	MD	6	Jul 27, 2013	Cotai Arena, Macau, SAR	
9	Win	9–0	Wandee Singwancha	TKO	4 (12), 1:04	May 28, 2013	Convention and Exhibition Centre, Wan Chai, Hong Kong	Retained WBC–ABCO Continental super-flyweight title
8	Win	8–0	Timur Shailezov	RTD	10 (12), 3:00	Dec 11, 2012	Convention and Exhibition Centre, Wan Chai, Hong Kong	Won vacant WBC–ABCO Continental super-flyweight title
7	Win	7–0	Manot Comput	UD	4	May 5, 2012	Marina Bay Sands Hotel, Singapore	
6	Win	6–0	Torsak Singabasak	TKO	1 (10), 1:55	Apr 26, 2012	Kowloonbay International Trade & Exhibition Centre, Kowloon, Hong Kong	
5	Win	5–0	Aldrin Janer	TKO	4 (4), 0:34	Feb 19, 2012	Balibago Gym, Santa Rosa, Philippines	
4	Win	4–0	Mabert Paulino	UD	4	Jan 28, 2012	Recom Dome, Caloocan, Philippines	
3	Win	3–0	Jeffrey Pajaroja	TKO	2 (4), 1:52	Dec 14, 2011	Brusmick Compound Gym, Santa Rosa, Philippines	
2	Win	2–0	Unknown	KO	1 (4), 1:09	Oct 25, 2011	Yiliang, People's Republic of China	
1	Win	1–0	Xian Qian Wei	UD	4	Sep 12, 2011	Kowloonbay International Trade & Exhibition Centre, Kowloon, Hong Kong	Professional debut

Sporting positions
Regional boxing titles
Vacant Title last held by Karoon Jarupianlerd	WBC–ABCO Continental super-flyweight champion Dec 11, 2012 – Jan 2015; Vacated	Vacant Title next held by Hong Kyoon Shin
Vacant Title last held by Arthur Villanueva	WBO Asia Pacific super-flyweight champion Feb 22, 2014 – Jul 2014; Vacated	Vacant Title next held by Karoon Jarupianlerd
Vacant Title last held by David Sánchez	WBA International super-flyweight champion Mar 7, 2015 – Nov 2015; Vacated	Vacant Title next held by Yohei Tobe
Vacant Title last held by Srisaket Sor Rungvisai	WBC–ABCO super-flyweight champion Aug 29, 2015 – present	Incumbent
Vacant Title last held by Rakniran Muadransarakam	WBO Asia Pacific super-flyweight champion May 14, 2016 – Sep 2016; Vacated	Vacant Title next held by Shota Kawaguchi
Vacant Title last held by Paul Butler	WBO International super-flyweight champion Oct 8, 2016 – present	Incumbent
Preceded by Hirofumi Mukai	WBO Asia Pacific super-flyweight champion Mar 11, 2017 – present	Incumbent
