= Genisis Libranza =

Filipino boxer

Personal information
- Nationality: Filipino
- Born: Genisis Lagumbay Libranza; 27 September 1993 (age 32) Bayugan, Philippines
- Height: 5 ft 5 in (165 cm)
- Weight: Flyweight

Boxing career
- Stance: Orthodox

Boxing record
- Total fights: 26
- Wins: 21
- Win by KO: 13
- Losses: 5

Genisis Lagumbay Libranza (born 27 September 1993) is a Filipino professional boxer.

== Professional boxing career ==
Libranza made his professional debut against Jhonny Belo on 8 February 2014. He won the fight by unanimous decision. Libranza amassed an 11–0 record during the next three years, with eight of those victories coming by way of stoppage. This undefeated streak earned Libranza the right to challenge the reigning IBO flyweight champion Moruti Mthalane on 28 April 2017. He suffered both his first professional loss, as well as his first stoppage loss, as Mthalane won the fight by a fourth-round knockout.

Libranza faced Romulo Ramayan Jr. for the MiniProBA title on 24 July 2017. He won the fight by a first-round technical knockout. Referee Ramuel Ovalo waved the fight off at the 2:35 minute mark, after Ramayan Jr. turned his back to his opponent, following a flurry of punches from Libranza.

Libranza faced Yujie Zeng on 29 September 2017. He won the fight by unanimous decision, with scores of 79–73, 78–74 and 80–72. Libranza faced Michael Enriquez on 17 December 2017. He won the fight by majority decision, with judges scoring the fight 98–92 for him, while the third judge scored it as an even 95–95 draw.

Libranza challenged Ryan Rey Ponteras for the PGA flyweight title on 14 April 2018. He won the fight by split decision, with two judges scoring the fight 115–113 and 117–112 for Libranza, while the third judge scored it 116–112 for Ponteras. Libranza made his first title defense against Renz Rosia on 14 October 2018. He won the fight by unanimous decision, with scores of 116–111, 115–112 and 114–113. Rosia was deducted a point in the fifth round for repeated low blows.

Libranza made his United States debut against Gilberto Mendoza on 9 February 2019, as the fight took place at the Dignity Health Sports Park in Carson, California. He won the fight by unanimous decision, with all three judges awarding Libranza a 78–74 scorecard. Libranza had his second consecutive United States fight on 20 July 2019, when he was scheduled to face Carlos Maldonado. He won the fight by a fourth-round technical knockout.

Libranza was expected to challenge the reigning WBO Oriental Bantamweight champion Vincent Astrolabio on 27 February 2021, following a 15-month absence from the sport. Astrolabio later withdrew from the bout for undisclosed reasons, and was replaced by John Mark Apolinario. He won the fight by a first-round knockout.

== Professional boxing record ==
28 fights	22 wins	6 losses
By knockout	14	4
By decision	8	2

No.	Result	Record	Opponent	Type	Round, time	Date	Location	Notes
28	Loss	22–6	Rex Tso	TKO	3 (10), 1:44	28 Feb 2026	The Grand Flash Ballroom of the Elorde Sports Complex, Parañaque, Philippines	For vacant IBF Pan Pacific bantamweight title
27	Win	22–5	Efren Segovia	TKO	1 (6)	27 Nov 2025	Maramag Municipal Gym, Maramag, Philippines	
26	Loss	21–5	John Vincent Pangga	KO	2 (10)	24 Aug 2025	The Grand Flash Ballroom of the Elorde Sports Complex, Parañaque, Philippines	
25	Loss	21–4	Landile Ngxeke	KO	3 (10)	14 Sep 2024	Vodacom Dome, Midrand, South Africa	For vacant WBO Inter-Continental bantamweight title
24	Win	21–3	Adisak Ketpiam	TKO	1 (8), 2:58	28 Dec 2023	Spaceplus Bangkok RCA, Bangkok, Thailand	
23	Loss	20–3	Phumelele Cafu	UD	10	20 Aug 2023	Orlando Community Hall, Soweto, South Africa	For vacant IBF International super flyweight title
22	Loss	20–2	Ben Ligas	UD	12	30 Mar 2023	Balon Bayambang Events Center, Bayambang, Philippines	For PGA Board flyweight title
21	Win	20–1	John Mark Apolinario	KO	1 (8), 2:30	27 Feb 2021	Bula Gym, General Santos City, Philippines	
20	Win	19–1	Carlos Maldonado	TKO	4 (8), 2:58	20 Jul 2019	Grand Garden Arena, Las Vegas, U.S.	
19	Win	18–1	Gilberto Mendoza	UD	8	9 Feb 2019	Dignity Health Sports Park, Carson, U.S.	
18	Win	17–1	Renz Rosia	UD	12	14 Oct 2018	Robinsons Place Butuan, Butuan City, Philippines	Retained PGA Board flyweight title
17	Win	16–1	Jetly Purisima	KO	1 (8), 2:40	21 Aug 2018	Gaisano Mall of Toril, Davao City, Philippines	
16	Win	15–1	Ryan Rey Ponteras	SD	12	14 Apr 2018	Justice George Malcolm Square, Baguio City, Philippines	Won PGA Board flyweight title
15	Win	14–1	Michael Enriquez	MD	10	17 Dec 2017	Robinson’s Mall Atrium, General Santos City, Philippines	
14	Win	13–1	Yujie Zeng	UD	8	29 Sep 2017	Heyuan Royal Garden Hotel, Beijing, China	
13	Win	12–1	Romulo Ramayan Jr	TKO	1 (8), 2:35	24 Jul 2017	South Cotabato Gym, Koronadal City, Philippines	Won vacant MiniProBA flyweight title
12	Loss	11–1	Moruti Mthalane	KO	4 (12), 1:23	28 Apr 2017	Wembley Indoor Arena, Johannesburg, South Africa	For IBO flyweight title
11	Win	11–0	Ronerex Dalut	TKO	3 (10), 2:31	17 Dec 2016	Robinson's Place, General Santos City, Philippines	
10	Win	10–0	Jetly Purisima	TKO	3 (10), 2:31	4 Jun 2016	Almendras Gym, Davao City, Philippines	
9	Win	9–0	Renerio Arizala	TKO	2 (10), 2:59	19 Dec 2015	Panabo City Gym, Panabo City, Philippines	
8	Win	8–0	Michael Rodriguez	UD	10	6 Sep 2015	Barangay Labangal Gym, General Santos City, Philippines	
7	Win	7–0	Rodel Tejares	TKO	2 (8), 1:55	30 May 2015	Lagao Gym, General Santos City, Philippines	
6	Win	6–0	Romulo Ramayan Jr	TKO	2 (8), 2:30	5 Apr 2015	Panabo Freedom Park, Panabo City, Philippines	
5	Win	5–0	Charlie Cabilla	TKO	2 (8), 2:30	8 Nov 2014	Almendras Gym, Davao City, Philippines	
4	Win	4–0	Edward Joaquino	MD	6	23 Aug 2014	Almendras Gym, Davao City, Philippines	
3	Win	3–0	Jessie Suacasa	RTD	2 (6), 3:00	28 Jun 2014	Almendras Gym, Davao City, Philippines	
2	Win	2–0	Paulo Perono	KO	3 (6), 0:51	3 May 2014	University of SouthEastern Philippines Gym, Davao City, Philippines	
1	Win	1–0	Jhonny Belo	UD	4	8 Feb 2014	Almendras Gym, Davao City, Philippines	
