= Mark Anthony Geraldo =

Filipino boxer

Mark Anthony Nipaya Geraldo (born 12 July 1991) is a Filipino professional boxer.

He lost to Takuma Inoue for the OPBF super flyweight title.

He has a loss to former world champion McJoe Arroyo and victories over world champion Jerwin Ancajas and Tanawat Phonnaku.

In 2017, Geraldo won his first regional title, the WBO Oriental bantamweight title.

He has been ranked at least as high as 3rd by the WBO and 9th by the IBF.

== Professional boxing record ==
60 fights	40 wins	17 losses
By knockout	21	6
By decision	19	10
By disqualification	0	1
Draws	3	

No.	Result	Record	Opponent	Type	Round, Time	Date	Location	Notes
60	Loss	40–17–3	(Philippines) Kenneth Llover	KO	2 (10), 2:17	15 Nov 2026	(Philippines) Dasmarinas Arena, Dasmarinas City, Cavite	
59	Loss	40–16–3	(Japan) Misaki Hirano	TD	8 (8), 030	Aug 30, 2026	West Japan General Exhibition Center, Kitakyushu	Unanimous TD: Geraldo cut from accidental headbutt
58	Loss	40–15–3	(Philippines) Lienard Sarcon	TKO	1 (12), 2:51	Jan 10, 2026	(Philippines) Nustar Resort and Casino, Cebu City	For vacant GAB featherweight title
57	Loss	40–14–3	(Japan) Fumiya Fuse	UD	8	Jun 30, 2025	(Japan) Korakuen Hall, Tokyo	
56	Win	40–13–3	(Philippines) Ryan Rey Ponteras	KO	5 (8)	Oct 14, 2024	(Philippines) Barangay Laligan, Valencia City	
55	Win	39–13–3	(Philippines) Ryan Rey Ponteras	RTD	5 (8)	Apr 8, 2024	(Philippines) Valencia City Gymnasium, Valencia City	
54	Loss	38–13–3	(Philippines) Mike Plania	TKO	1 (10), 2:11	May 17, 2023	(Philippines) SanMan Boxing Gym, General Santos City	
53	Loss	38–12–3	(South Africa) Ludumo Lamati	KO	4 (10), 2:09	Nov 17, 2022	(South Africa) Durban Casino, Durban	
52	Loss	38–11–3	(Japan) Ryuto Owan	UD	8	Aug 30, 2022	(Japan) Korakuen Hall, Tokyo	
51	Loss	38–10–3	(Philippines) Carl Jammes Martin	UD	12	Dec 4, 2021	(Philippines) The Flash Grand Ballroom of the Elorde Sports Complex, Paranaque City	Lost GAB super bantamweight title
50	Win	38–9–3	(Philippines) Lorence Rosas	TKO	8 (12), 2:23	Sep 20, 2019	(Philippines) Mandaluyong City Hall Grounds, Mandaluyong City	Retained GAB super bantamweight title
49	Win	37–9–3	(Philippines) Virgel Vitor	KO	6 (12), 2:22	Feb 11, 2019	(Philippines) Poblacion II Covered Court, Tagbilaran City	Won vacant GAB super bantamweight title
48	Win	36–9–3	(Philippines) Nicardo Calamba	TKO	3 (10), 0:51	Nov 24, 2018	(Philippines) Kitaotao, Bukidnon	
47	Win	35–9–3	(Philippines) Jetly Purisima	KO	2 (10), 0:21	Mar 14, 2018	(Philippines) Lugait Freedom Park, Lugait	
46	Loss	34–9–3	(France) Nordine Oubaali	KO	7 (12), 1:15	Dec 16, 2017	(France) La Seine Musicale, Boulogne-Billancourt	For WBC Silver bantamweight title
45	Win	34–8–3	(Philippines) Kenny Demecillo	UD	10	Mar 11, 2017	Hong Kong Convention and Exhibition Center, Hong Kong	Won vacant WBO Oriental bantamweight title
44	Loss	33–8–3	(Philippines) Jeson Umbal	TKO	5 (12), 0:47	Jul 23, 2016	Far East Square, Singapore	For vacant WBC Asian Continental super bantamweight title
43	Win	33–7–3	(Philippines) Jeson Umbal	UD	10	Feb 13, 2016	(Philippines) Buluan, Maguindanao	
42	Win	32–7–3	(Philippines) Jelbirt Gomera	TKO	6 (8), 2:39	Nov 29, 2015	(Philippines) Oval Plaza Covered Court, General Santos City	
41	Loss	31–7–3	(Japan) Takuma Inoue	UD	12	Jul 6, 2015	(Japan) Korakuen Hall, Tokyo	For vacant OPBF super flyweight title
40	Loss	31–6–3	(Puerto Rico) McJoe Arroyo	UD	12	Dec 20, 2014	(Puerto Rico) El San Juan Resort and Casino, Carolina	IBF super flyweight title eliminator
39	Win	31–5–3	(Mexico) Efrain Perez	UD	6	Jul 19, 2014	(Macau) Cotai Arena, Venetian Resort, Macao	
38	Win	30–5–3	(Philippines) Elmar Francisco	TKO	1 (10), 0:15	Apr 12, 2014	(Philippines) Macasandig Gym, Barangay Macasandig, Cagayan de Oro City	
37	Win	29–5–3	(Thailand) Inthanon Sithchamuang	TKO	2 (10), 1:10	Oct 26, 2013	(Japan) Makati Coliseum, Makati City	Retained WBO Asia Pacific Youth super flyweight title
36	Win	28–5–3	(Japan) Hirofumi Mukai	KO	2 (10), 3:04	Apr 7, 2013	(Philippines) Sumiyoshi Ward Center, Osaka	
35	Win	27–5–3	(Philippines) Jessie Tuyor	TKO	8 (10), 0:36	Aug 10, 2012	(Philippines) Plaza Lapasan, Barangay Lapasan, Cagayan de Oro City	
34	Win	26–5–3	(Philippines) Edison Berwela	UD	10	May 13, 2012	(Philippines) Yñares Sports Arena, Pasig City	
33	Win	25–5–3	(Philippines) Jerwin Ancajas	MD	10	Mar 17, 2012	(Philippines) Hoops Dome, Lapu-Lapu City	Won WBO Asia Pacific Youth super flyweight title
32	Win	24–5–3	(Philippines) Fredirex Rodriguez	UD	10	Jan 21, 2012	(Philippines) Father Saturnino Urios University Gym, Butuan City	Won PBF bantamweight title
31	Loss	23–5–3	(Philippines) Ronnie Apilado	DQ	5 (10)	Dec 4, 2011	(Philippines) M'lang Cotabato del Norte	
30	Win	23–4–3	(Philippines) Jilo Merlin	UD	10	Aug 26, 2011	(Philippines) Dangcagan Covered Court, Dangcagan	
29	Loss	22–4–3	(Thailand) Oleydong Sithsamerchai	UD	12	Jul 29, 2011	(Thailand) Wat Sakae School, Uthai	For vacant WBC International Silver super flyweight title
28	Loss	22–3–3	(Philippines) Arthur Villanueva	TD	6 (8), 1:52	Apr 9, 2011	(Philippines) University of Saint La Salle Coliseum, Bacolod City	Fight stopped due to a cut above Villanueva's right eye caused by an accidental headbutt in round 6
27	Win	22–2–3	(Philippines) Jonathan Ricablanca	UD	10	Feb 5, 2011	(Philippines) Valencia City, Bukidnon	
26	Win	21–2–3	(Philippines) Gedeon Amba	SD	10	Nov 5, 2010	(Philippines) Yñares Sports Arena, Pasig City	
25	Win	20–2–3	(Philippines) Ricardo Roa	TKO	8 (10), 2:29	Oct 6, 2010	(Philippines) Glan, Sarangani	
24	Win	19–2–3	(Philippines) Rocky Sardido	TD	9 (10), 0:38	Aug 24, 2010	(Philippines) Valencia City, Bukidnon	
23	Loss	18–2–3	(Philippines) Mhar Jhun Macahilig	UD	8	Jul 13, 2010	(Philippines) Lutopan Recreation Center, Barangay Lutopan, Toledo City	
22	Win	18–1–3	(Philippines) Marvin Fernandez	TKO	7 (10), 1:30	Jun 17, 2010	(Philippines) Kitaotao, Bukidnon	
21	Draw	17–1–3	(Philippines) Freddie Martinez	SD	8	Feb 2, 2010	(Philippines) Cabadbaran City Gymnasium, Cabadbaran	
20	Draw	17–1–2	(Philippines) Rocky Sardido	TD	2 (8), 2:40	Nov 28, 2009	(Philippines) Valencia City Gymnasium, Valencia City	Fight stopped due to a cut over Sardido's left eye caused by an accidental headbutt
19	Win	17–1–1	(Philippines) Jovanne Marindique	UD	6	Aug 29, 2009	(Philippines) Provincial Capitol Grounds, Cagayan de Oro City	
18	Win	16–1–1	(Philippines) Freddie Martinez	MD	8	Jul 18, 2009	(Philippines) Bukidnon Sugar Company (BUSCO) Covered Court, Barangay Butong, Quezon, Bukidnon	
17	Draw	15–1–1	(Philippines) Ricky Sabia	MD	8	Jun 27, 2009	(Philippines) Mati Socio-Cultural Center, Mati City	
16	Win	15–1	(Philippines) Jog Alim	MD	6	May 14, 2008	(Philippines) Malaybalay City, Bukidnon	
15	Win	14–1	(Philippines) Jog Alim	MD	4	Feb 21, 2009	(Philippines) Plaza Lapasan, Barangay Lapasan, Cagayan de Oro City	
14	Win	13–1	(Philippines) Jerry Baja	TKO	2 (6), 2:50	Feb 2, 2009	(Philippines) Cabadbaran, Agusan del Norte	
13	Win	12–1	(Philippines) Arwin Ada	MD	6	Dec 27, 2008	(Philippines) Valencia City Gymnasium, Valencia City	
12	Win	11–1	(Philippines) Arcil Pama	TKO	2 (6), 2:50	Nov 22, 2008	(Philippines) Valencia City, Bukidnon	
11	Win	10–1	(Philippines) Junrey Naive	TKO	3 (4), 1:12	Oct 30, 2008	(Philippines) Atrium, Limketkai Mall, Cagayan de Oro City	
10	Win	9–1	(Philippines) Rex Olisa	SD	4	Oct 18, 2008	(Philippines) Binan Town Plaza, Binan City	
9	Loss	8–1	(Philippines) Alvin Bais	UD	6	Sep 27, 2008	(Philippines) General Luna Municipal Gymnasium, General Luna, Siargao del Norte	
8	Win	8–0	(Philippines) Rey Villar	KO	5 (6), 0:53	Aug 27, 2008	(Philippines) Atrium, Limketkai Mall, Cagayan de Oro City	
7	Win	7–0	(Philippines) Israel Salud	TKO	1 (4), 2:54	Aug 2, 2008	(Philippines) Waterfront Cebu City Hotel & Casino, Barangay Lahug, Cebu City	
6	Win	6–0	(Philippines) Mark Laraya	TKO	3 (4), 2:54	Jun 7, 2008	(Philippines) Almendras Gym, Davao City	
5	Win	5–0	(Philippines) Allan Achas	MD	4	May 20, 2008	(Philippines) Cabanglasan Gym, Cabanglasan	
4	Win	4–0	(Philippines) Arwin Ada	UD	4	May 11, 2008	(Philippines) Malaybalay City, Bukidnon	
3	Win	3–0	(Philippines) Brian Diano	KO	1 (4), 2:59	Apr 26, 2008	(Philippines) Don Mariano Polytechnic College Gym, Cagayan de Oro City	
2	Win	2–0	(Philippines) Ryan Tampus	UD	4	Mar 29, 2008	(Philippines) Mandaue City Plaza Square, Barangay Centro, Mandaue City	
1	Win	1–0	(Philippines) Jofel Canja	TKO	2 (4), 2:48	Dec 18, 2007	(Philippines) Valencia City Gymnasium, Valencia City	
