= Ryuichi Funai =

Japanese boxer

Personal information
- Nationality: (Japan) Japanese
- Born: 船井龍一; August 13, 1985 (age 40) Tokyo, Japan
- Height: 5 ft 7 in (170 cm)
- Weight: Super flyweight

Boxing career
- Reach: 68 in (173 cm)
- Stance: Orthodox

Boxing record
- Total fights: 39
- Wins: 31
- Win by KO: 22
- Losses: 8

Ryuichi Funai (船井龍一, Funai Ryuichi; born 13 August 1985) is a Japanese professional boxer. He is the current WBO Asia Pacific Super Flyweight Champion and held the Japanese Super Flyweight title. Funai is highly ranked in the Super Flyweight Division at #11 and in 2018-2019 ranked by the IBF at #1 spot. He was born and raised in Tokyo.

== Professional career ==
On 14 June 2018, Funai fought former world title contender Warlito Parrenas of the Philippines for the WBO Asia Pacific super-flyweight title, and won it by 8th-round knockout. Funai faced Jerwin Ancajas for the IBF super-flyweight title on 5 May 2019, losing by a 7th round stoppage due to ring doctor's advice.

== Professional boxing record ==
39 fights	31 wins	8 losses
By knockout	22	4
By decision	9	4

No.	Result	Record	Opponent	Type	Round, time	Date	Location	Notes
39	Loss	31–8	(Philippines) Jerwin Ancajas	RTD	7 (12), 3:00	May 4, 2019	(United States) Stockton Arena, Stockton, California, U.S.	For IBF super-flyweight title
38	Win	31–7	(Mexico) Victor Emanuel Olivo	TKO	2 (12), 2:09	Nov 10, 2018	Korakuen Hall, Tokyo, Japan	
37	Win	30–7	(Philippines) Warlito Parrenas	KO	8 (12), 2:55	Apr 23, 2017	Korakuen Hall, Tokyo, Japan	Won vacant WBO Asia Pacific super-flyweight title
36	Win	29–7	(Japan) Shota Kawaguchi	TKO	2 (10), 3:09	Dec 11, 2017	Korakuen Hall, Tokyo, Japan	Retained Japanese super-flyweight Title
35	Win	28–7	(Japan) Takayuki Okumoto	TD	7 (10), 1:32	Jul 23, 2017	Korakuen Hall, Tokyo, Japan	Retained Japanese super-flyweight Title
34	Win	27–7	(Japan) Kenta Nakagawa	KO	7 (10), 2:59	Mar 22, 2017	Korakuen Hall, Tokyo, Japan	Won Japanese super-flyweight Title
33	Win	26–7	(Thailand) Surasit Khiankhwao	KO	1 (8), 1:20	Oct 22, 2016	Korakuen Hall, Tokyo, Japan	
32	Win	25–7	(Thailand) Tnananut Johphromma	TKO	3 (5), 1:48	Jul 27, 2016	Korakuen Hall, Tokyo, Japan	
31	loss	24–7	(Japan) Sho Ishida	MD	10	Apr 17, 2016	EDION Arena Osaka, Osaka, Japan	For Japanese super-flyweight title
30	Win	24–6	(Philippines) Ryan Bito	UD	8	Jun 26, 2015	Korakuen Hall, Tokyo, Japan	
29	Win	23–6	(Japan) Ryuta Otsuka	KO	3 (8), 1:39	Mar 26, 2015	Korakuen Hall, Tokyo, Japan	
28	Win	22–6	(Japan) Toshikuni Wake	TKO	4 (8), 1:15	Oct 24, 2014	Korakuen Hall, Tokyo, Japan	
27	Win	21–6	(Japan) Akinori Hoshino	MD	8	Sep 11, 2014	Korakuen Hall, Tokyo, Japan	
26	Win	20–6	(Japan) Masafumi Otake	TKO	3 (8), 1:37	Dec 9, 2013	Korakuen Hall, Tokyo, Japan	
25	Win	19–6	(Thailand) Sarawit Sodseechan	TKO	1 (8), 0:48	Aug 30, 2013	Korakuen Hall, Tokyo, Japan	
24	Win	18–6	(Thailand) Gitti Sintipla	KO	3 (6), 1:40	Mar 21, 2013	Korakuen Hall, Tokyo, Japan	
23	loss	17–6	(Philippines) Rolly Lunas	TKO	9 (12)	Sep 23, 2012	Sangyo Hall, Kanazawa, Japan	For OPBF bantamweight title
22	Win	17–5	(Japan) Eiji Tsutsumi	TKO	7 (8), 1:51	May 5, 2011	Korakuen Hall, Tokyo, Japan	
21	Win	16–5	(Japan) Teppei Kikui	TKO	5 (8), 1:35	Feb 10, 2012	Korakuen Hall, Tokyo, Japan	
20	Win	15–5	(Japan) Yuki Tsuge	TKO	7 (8), 2:45	Sep 30, 2011	Korakuen Hall, Tokyo, Japan	
19	Win	14–5	(Japan) Gakuya Furuhashi	SD	8	Jun 17, 2011	Korakuen Hall, Tokyo, Japan	
18	loss	13–5	(Japan) Masahiro Ishida	SD	8	Feb 24, 2011	Korakuen Hall, Tokyo, Japan	
17	Win	13–4	(Japan) Hiroki Shiino	MD	8	Aug 9, 2010	Korakuen Hall, Tokyo, Japan	
16	Win	12–4	(Japan) Zaragoza Uema	UD	5	May 17, 2010	Super Arena, Saitama, Japan	
15	Win	11–4	(Japan) Yohei Kudo	TKO	2 (8), 1:36	Apr 12, 2009	Korakuen Hall, Tokyo, Japan	
14	Win	10–4	(Japan) Kohei Natori	TKO	3 (8), 1:21	Sep 5, 2009	Korakuen Hall, Tokyo, Japan	
13	Win	9–4	(Japan) Toshihiro Tanaka	KO	7 (8), 2:10	Jun 24, 2009	Korakuen Hall, Tokyo, Japan	
12	loss	8–4	(Japan) Shinsuke Yamanaka	TKO	7 (8), 2:54	Jan 17, 2009	Korakuen Hall, Tokyo, Japan	
11	Win	8–3	(Japan) Yosuke Enda	KO	3 (6), 2:13	Nov 1, 2008	Korakuen Hall, Tokyo, Japan	
10	Win	7–3	(Japan) Nenta Wako	KO	1 (6), 1:22	Mar 10, 2008	Korakuen Hall, Tokyo, Japan	
9	loss	6–3	(Japan) Takahiro Furukawa	UD	5	Nov 4, 2007	Korakuen Hall, Tokyo, Japan	
8	Win	6-2	(Japan) Yuki Fukumoto	TKO	4 (4), 1:33	Sep 27, 2007	Korakuen Hall, Tokyo, Japan	
7	Win	5–2	(Japan) Kenichi Yamanobe	TKO	3 (4), 2:39	Aug 17, 2007	Korakuen Hall, Tokyo, Japan	
6	Win	4–2	(Japan) Satoshi Watanabe	UD	4	Jul 3, 2007	Korakuen Hall, Tokyo, Japan	
5	Win	3–2	(Japan) Hiroshi Ito	UD	4	Feb 7, 2007	Korakuen Hall, Tokyo, Japan	
4	loss	2–2	(Japan) Kenichi Yoshioka	TKO	4 (4), 2:20	Dec 5, 2006	Korakuen Hall, Tokyo, Japan	
3	loss	2–1	(Japan) Yuki Fukumoto	UD	4	Oct 11, 2006	Korakuen Hall, Tokyo, Japan	
2	Win	2–0	(Japan) Takuya Otsuki	KO	1 (4), 2:44	Apr 24, 2006	Korakuen Hall, Tokyo, Japan	
1	Win	1–0	(Japan) Takahiro Kunishima	UD	4	Feb 14, 2005	Korakuen Hall, Tokyo, Japan	
