= Jerwin Ancajas =

Filipino boxer (born 1992)

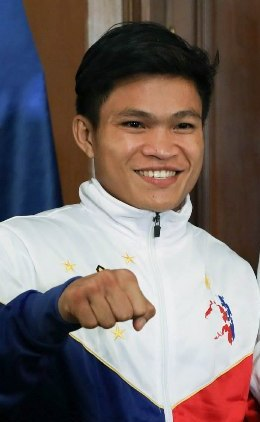
- Ancajas in 2017

Personal information
- Nickname: Pretty Boy
- Born: Jerwin Juntilla Ancajas; 1 January 1992 (age 34) Panabo, Davao del Norte, Philippines
- Height: 5 ft 6 in (168 cm)
- Weight: Super flyweight; Bantamweight

Boxing career
- Reach: 66 1/2 in (169 cm)
- Stance: Southpaw

Boxing record
- Total fights: 45
- Wins: 38
- Win by KO: 25
- Losses: 5
- Draws: 2

Jerwin Juntilla Ancajas (born 1 January 1992) is a Filipino professional boxer. He held the IBF junior-bantamweight title from 2016 to 2022.

== Personal life ==
Jerwin was born and raised in Panabo, a suburb of Davao del Norte, Philippines. He was introduced to boxing in the second grade by his brother, Jesar. Jerwin would go on to win several national championships, including a gold medal at the Palarong Pambansa, before turning pro in 2009, at the age of 17. Jerwin Ancajas has a 90–5 record in the Amateur Boxing. Jerwin Ancajas currently lives in Brgy. Ramirez, Magallanes, Cavite together with his brother, Jesar Ancajas.

== Professional career ==
Ancajas made his professional debut in July 2009. He won his first major title; WBO Asia Pacific Youth junior-bantamweight title against Rex Tito scheduled in SM City Lipa. Jerwin Ancajas suffered a loss in his fifteenth pro bout, losing a majority decision to Mark Anthony Geraldo.

He became the IBF junior bantamweight champion when he defeated McJoe Arroyo on September 3, 2016. Ancajas earned just $3,750 for the fight. He entered the fight on an 11-fight win streak. Ancajas comfortably outboxed Arroyo, and dropped him in round 8 to win a unanimous decision.

Ancajas made his first defense on January 29, 2017, beating José Alfredo Rodríguez by technical knockout, after Rodríguez was unable to continue due to injury. Ancajas made a further defense in July 2017, on the undercard of Manny Pacquiao-Jeff Horn against Teiru Kinoshita. Ancajas battered Kinoshita, opening a cut over his right eye and pummeling him to the body, before dropping him in round 7 with a right hook to the body. Kinoshita beat the count but the referee stopped the fight, giving Ancajas a TKO win. On November 18, 2017, Ancajas defeated Jamie Conlan with a round 6 TKO. Conlan was battered from the first round, going down after a body shot. He was dropped three more times until the referee stopped the fight. Ancajas was deducted a point in round 5 by referee Steve Gray, following a legitimate shot to Conlan's abdomen. With the win, Ancajas made his third successful title defense in 2017, all by technical knockout and in different countries.

In December, it was announced that Ancajas had signed with Top Rank and would make his U.S. debut in February 2018, defending his title against Israel González in Corpus Christi, Texas. On 3 February 2018, Ancajas would successfully defend his IBF belt in his US debut.

In his next title defence, Ancajas faced IBF #1 ranked title contender Jonas Sultan. Ancajas won the fight comfortably, winning by a wide margin on all three scorecards, namely 119–109, 119-109 and 117–111.

On 29 September 2018, Ancajas battled IBF #14 Alejandro Santiago Barrios. Barrios proved a tough opponent for the IBF champion, but could only fight to a draw as Ancajas was able to keep his belt.

In his next fight, Ancajas fought #1 IBF contender Ryuichi Funai. Ancajas overmatched Funai for most of the fight, as Funai was able to take some of his best shots, but did not counter Ancajas with any of his own. Ancajas finished his opponent in round seven.

On 7 December 2019, Ancajas had another successful title defence, this time against IBF #14 Miguel Gonzalez. Ancajas won via a sixth-round TKO.

Ancajas was scheduled to make his ninth IBF title defense against Jonathan Javier Rodriguez on April 10, 2021. He won the fight by unanimous decision, with scores of 115–112, 116–111, and 117–110.

== Professional boxing record ==
45 fights	38 wins	5 losses
By knockout	25	1
By decision	12	4
By disqualification	1	0
Draws	2	

No.	Result	Record	Opponent	Type	Round, time	Date	Location	Notes
45	Loss	38–5–2	Omar Trinidad	UD	10	28 Jun 2026	The Cosmopolitan, Paradise, Nevada, U.S	
44	Win	38–4–2	Ruben Tostado	TKO	4 (8), 0:10	18 Apr 2026	Arena Tecate, Tijuana, Mexico	
43	Win	37–4–2	Ruben Dario Casero	MD	8	2 Aug 2025	Thunder Studios, Long Beach, California, U.S.	
42	Win	36–4–2	Richie Mepranum	TKO	2 (12), 2:20	25 Jan 2025	Public Plaza, Iligan, Philippines	Won vacant Philippines GAB junior featherweight title
41	Win	35–4–2	Sukpraserd Ponpitak	DQ	5 (10)	22 Sep 2024	Mandaluyong City College, Mandaluyong, Philippines	
40	Loss	34–4–2	Takuma Inoue	KO	9 (12), 0:44	24 Feb 2024	Ryōgoku Kokugikan, Tokyo, Japan	For WBA bantamweight title
39	Win	34–3–2	Wilner Soto	TKO	5 (8), 2:41	24 Jun 2023	Minneapolis Armory, Minneapolis, Minnesota, U.S.	
38	Loss	33–3–2	Fernando Martínez	UD	12	8 Oct 2022	Dignity Health Sports Park, Carson, California, U.S.	For IBF junior-bantamweight title
37	Loss	33–2–2	Fernando Martínez	UD	12	26 Feb 2022	The Cosmopolitan, Paradise, Nevada, U.S.	Lost IBF junior-bantamweight title
36	Win	33–1–2	Jonathan Javier Rodriguez	UD	12	10 Apr 2021	Mohegan Sun Arena, Montville, Connecticut, U.S.	Retained IBF junior-bantamweight title
35	Win	32–1–2	Miguel Gonzalez	TKO	6 (12), 1:53	7 Dec 2019	Auditorio GNP Seguros, Puebla, Mexico	Retained IBF junior-bantamweight title
34	Win	31–1–2	Ryuichi Funai	RTD	6 (12), 3:00	4 May 2019	Stockton Arena, Stockton, California, U.S.	Retained IBF junior-bantamweight title
33	Draw	30–1–2	Alexandro Santiago	SD	12	29 Sep 2018	Oracle Arena, Oakland, California, U.S.	Retained IBF junior-bantamweight title
32	Win	30–1–1	Jonas Sultan	UD	12	26 May 2018	Save Mart Center, Fresno, California, U.S.	Retained IBF junior-bantamweight title
31	Win	29–1–1	Israel González	TKO	10 (12), 1:50	3 Feb 2018	American Bank Center, Corpus Christi, Texas, U.S.	Retained IBF junior-bantamweight title
30	Win	28–1–1	Jamie Conlan	TKO	6 (12), 0:52	18 Nov 2017	SSE Arena, Belfast, Northern Ireland	Retained IBF junior-bantamweight title
29	Win	27–1–1	Teiru Kinoshita	TKO	7 (12), 1:53	2 Jul 2017	Suncorp Stadium, Brisbane, Australia	Retained IBF junior-bantamweight title
28	Win	26–1–1	José Alfredo Rodríguez	RTD	7 (12), 3:00	29 Jan 2017	Cotai Arena, Macau, S.A.R.	Retained IBF junior-bantamweight title
27	Win	25–1–1	McJoe Arroyo	UD	12	3 Sep 2016	Jurado Hall, Taguig, Philippines	Won IBF junior-bantamweight title
26	Win	24–1–1	Paul Apolinario	KO	1 (10), 0:35	13 Nov 2015	Bonifacio Naval Station, Taguig, Philippines	
25	Win	23–1–1	Juan Purisima	KO	9 (10), 1:57	30 May 2015	Lagao Gym, General Santos, Philippines	
24	Win	22–1–1	Fadhili Majiha	KO	3 (8), 1:48	23 Nov 2014	Cotai Arena, Macau, S.A.R.	
23	Win	21–1–1	Rachmat Santoso	TKO	1 (10), 2:55	23 Aug 2014	Almendras Gym, Davao City, Davao del Sur	
22	Win	20–1–1	Petchwanchai Sor Visetkit	KO	1 (12), 2:16	3 May 2014	USeP, Davao City, Philippines	Won IBF Pan Pacific junior-bantamweight title
21	Win	19–1–1	Inthanon Sithchamuang	KO	2 (8), 1:30	22 Feb 2014	Cotai Arena, Macau, S.A.R.	
20	Win	18–1–1	Ryan Bongcawil	KO	2 (10), 1:58	14 Dec 2013	Lagao Gym, General Santos, Philippines	
19	Win	17–1–1	Armando Casa	TKO	4 (8), 0:59	30 Aug 2013	Lucena City Recreational Gym, Lucena, Philippines	Won Philippines Luzon PBA bantamweight title
18	Win	16–1–1	Runlong Xu	TKO	4 (6)	21 Dec 2012	Haikou, China	
17	Win	15–1–1	Miguel Tamayo	TKO	10 (10), 2:46	21 Sep 2012	Cuneta Astrodome, Pasay, Philippines	
16	Win	14–1–1	John Paul Bautista	RTD	3 (10), 3:00	12 Aug 2012	Ynares Sports Arena, Pasig, Philippines	
15	Loss	13–1–1	Mark Anthony Geraldo	MD	10	17 Mar 2012	Hoops Dome, Lapu-Lapu, Philippines	Lost WBO Asia Pacific Youth junior-bantamweight title
14	Win	13–0–1	Rodel Quilaton	UD	12	23 Nov 2011	Imus Plaza, Imus, Philippines	
13	Win	12–0–1	Jing Xiang	UD	10	27 Aug 2011	People's Stadium, Tianjin, China	
12	Win	11–0–1	Jason Egera	TKO	8 (10), 2:38	6 Aug 2011	Island Cove, Kawit, Philippines	
11	Win	10–0–1	Rex Tito	UD	10	16 Apr 2011	SM City Lipa, Lipa, Philippines	Won WBO Asia Pacific Youth junior-bantamweight title
10	Win	9–0–1	Pit Anacaya	UD	10	19 Feb 2011	Imus Plaza, Imus, Philippines	
9	Win	8–0–1	Menard Zaragosa	UD	10	22 Dec 2010	Imus Sports Gymnasium, Imus, Philippines	
8	Win	7–0–1	Julius Agcopra	TKO	3 (8), 1:08	20 Nov 2010	Mahinog Gym, Mahinog, Philippines	
7	Win	6–0–1	Leo de Guia	UD	8	26 Sep 2010	Imus Plaza, Imus, Philippines	
6	Win	5–0–1	Redney Quezon	TKO	6 (6), 0:27	7 Aug 2010	Maasim, Philippines	
5	Win	4–0–1	Leo de Guia	UD	6	26 Jun 2010	Barangay Maranding, Lala, Philippines	
4	Draw	3–0–1	Ervin Yamo	TD	6	15 May 2010	Cebu Coliseum, Cebu City, Philippines	
3	Win	3–0	Jimmy Paypa	MD	4	25 Sep 2009	Cebu Coliseum, Cebu City, Philippines	
2	Win	2–0	Sherwin McDo Lungay	TKO	1 (4), 1:02	3 Sep 2009	Polomolok Gym, Polomolok, Philippines	
1	Win	1–0	Reynaldo Buluan	TKO	1 (4), 0:48	27 Jul 2009	Polanco, Philippines	

== See also ==
- List of southpaw stance boxers
- List of Filipino boxing world champions
- List of world super-flyweight boxing champions

Sporting positions
Regional boxing titles
Vacant Title last held by A. J. Banal	WBO Asia Pacific Youth super flyweight champion April 16, 2011 – March 17, 2012	Succeeded by Mark Anthony Geraldo
Vacant Title last held by Alie Laurel	Philippines Luzon PBA bantamweight champion August 30, 2013 – 2014; Vacated	Vacant Title next held by Ernesto Saulong
Vacant Title last held by Pipat Chaiporn	IBF Pan Pacific super flyweight champion May 3, 2014 – 2015; Vacated	Vacant Title next held by Aston Palicte
World boxing titles
Preceded by McJoe Arroyo	IBF super flyweight champion September 3, 2016 – February 26, 2022	Succeeded by Fernando Martínez
