= Inthanon Sithchamuang =

Thai boxer

Tanawat Phonnaku, also known as Inthanon Sithchamuang (born: January 12, 1987 in Sakon Nakhon province), is a Thai professional boxer.

== Professional boxing record ==
39 fights	30 wins	9 losses
By decision	30	9

He lost to Kohei Kono for the World Boxing Association world super flyweight world title.

Phonnaku holds a defeat by Jerwin Ancajas and Mark Anthony Geraldo.

In November 2016, Hirofumi Mukai defeated world title contender Tanawat Phonnaku to claim Tso’s vacated WBO Asia-Pacific Junior Bantamweight title.
