= Durban Ice Arena =

Sports venue in Durban, KwaZulu-Natal, South Africa

Coordinates: 29.84439°S 31.03301°E

Durban Ice Arena is an multi-purpose complex located in the golden mile of Durban, KwaZulu-Natal, South Africa. The complex is composed of an ice rink, convention center, exhibition halls and meeting rooms. The Durban Ice Arena is considered one of Durban's most iconic and historic recreational facilities. Opening its entryways in 2015, The Durban Ice Arena has turned into a firm most loved in media outlets, to a great extent because of its position inside Durban's Golden Mile and nearness to lodgings, shorelines, Durban's vacation spots and milestones.
