= 2026 PSA Annual Awards =

Annual athletic award

- Date: February 16, 2026
- Location: Diamond Hotel, Manila
- Country: Philippines
- Hosted by: Quinito Henson; Denise Tan

Television/radio coverage
- Network: Cignal TV; Sports Radio

The 2026 San Miguel Corporation (SMC)-Philippine Sportswriters Association (PSA) Annual Awards was an annual awarding ceremony recognizing the sports personalities, teams, national sports associations and entities that clinched success and breakthroughs to Philippine sports in the year 2025.

== Details ==
The awards ceremony was held on February 16, 2026, at the Diamond Ballroom of the Diamond Hotel in Manila. It was supposed to schedule on February 2 but later moved due to "unforeseen circumstances".

A total of 148 athletes, coaches, sports personalities, and organizations honored for their achievements in the past year received their respective trophies during the annual staging of the PSA Awards, widely regarded as the “Oscars of Philippine Sports”.

Philippine Sports Commission (PSC) Chairman Patrick Gregorio, who is the Executive of the Year, served as the guest speaker, while they also invited Philippine Olympic Committee President Abraham Tolentino, Philippine Paralympic Committee President Michael Barredo and other top Philippine sports officials to attend the occasion.

The Philippine Sportswriters Association (PSA), currently led by its president Francis T.J. Ochoa, sports editor of the Philippine Daily Inquirer is the country's oldest media organization, having been established in 1948. Its membership is composed of sportswriters, reporters, editors, and columnists representing Philippines-based print media (broadsheets and tabloids), online sports news platforms, broadcast media (television and radio), as well as digital and social media outlets.

== Honor roll ==
=== Main awards ===
The following are the list of main awards of the event.

==== Co-Athletes of the Year ====
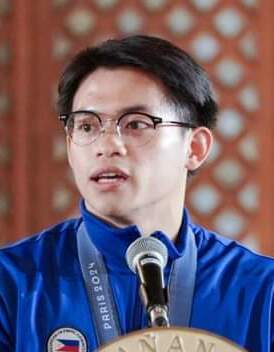
Carlos Yulo named as the Co-Athletes of the Year of the PSA for 2025.

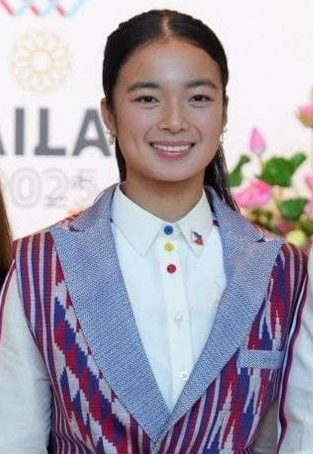
Alex Eala named as the Co-Athletes of the Year of the PSA for 2025.

The PSA unanimously voted Carlos Yulo and Alex Eala as the Male and Female Athletes of the Year for 2025, the first since 2004 where Manny Pacquiao and Jennifer Rosales chosen as co-Athletes of the Year in the prestigious awards night. This is also Yulo's second PSA Athlete of the Year honors since 2024, and the first for Eala. Yulo personally attended the awards night, while Eala, who was unable to receive her award in person due to her commitments abroad, sent a video message during the awarding.

Other athletes considered for the Athlete of the Year award are pool player Chezka Centeno, golfer Miguel Tabuena and swimmer Kayla Sanchez.

Award	Winner	Sport/Team/Recognition	References
Co-Athletes of the Year and Milo Champion of Grit and Glory Award	Carlos Yulo	Gymnastics (Artistic); Gold Medalist, Vault and Bronze Medalist, Floor Exercise, 53rd FIG Artistic Gymnastics World Championships	
Co-Athletes of the Year and Milo Champion of Grit and Glory Award	Alex Eala	Tennis (Women's Singles); Semifinalist, WTA 1000 Miami Open, Titlist, WTA 125 Guadalajara Open and Gold and Bronze Medalist, 2025 Southeast Asian Games	

==== Main awardees ====
Award	Winner	Sport/Team/Recognition	References\
President's Award	Joseller "Yeng" Guiao	Basketball; Coach, Rain or Shine Elasto Painters and Former Representative, Pampanga's 1st congressional district, Responsible for Supreme Court's ruiling ordering Philippine Amusement and Gaming Corporation and Philippine Charity Sweepstakes Office to remit the full amounts to the Philippine Sports Commission under Republic Act 6847	
Lifetime Achievement Award	Elorde family	Boxing; Producing top Filipino world boxing champions and contenders through Elorde Boxing Promotions	
Lifetime Achievement Award	Milagros "Mila" Emperado	Chess; Member, Philippines women's chess team at the 22nd Chess Olympiad in Israel and Founder, Milo Checkmate Chess Academy	
Lifetime Achievement Award	Romeo "Romy" Guevara	Basketball; International and national basketball referee, supervisor and consultant for major leagues in the Philippines	
Lifetime Achievement Award	Philippines Davis Cup team at the 1991 Davis Cup; Felix Barrientos, Roland So and Sofronio Palahang	Tennis; Reached the World Group playoffs in the 1991 Davis Cup vs. Sweden	
Lifetime Achievement Award	Monico Puentevella	Weightlifting; Former commissioner, Philippine Sports Commission, current president, Samahang Weightlifting ng Pilipinas and International Weightlifting Federation Hall of Fame Recipient	
Hall of Fame Award	Frankie Miñoza	Golf; PSA Athlete of the Year, 1990 and 1998 and Asian Tour Order of Merit	
National Sports Association of the Year	Gymnastics Association of the Philippines; President: Cynthia Carrion	Gymnastics; Responsible for Carlos Yulo's gold medal finish at the Asian Championships, Karl Eldrew Yulo's bronze medal finish and successful hosting of 2025 Junior World Artistic Gymnastics Championships	
Executive of the Year	Patrick Gregorio	Sport management Chairman, Philippine Sports Commission (PSC)	
Mr. Basketball	Junemar Fajardo	Basketball; Center, Gilas Pilipinas - PH Men's Basketball Team/San Miguel Beermen | 9-time Philippine Basketball Association Most Valuable Player	
Mr. Volleyball	Bryan Bagunas	Volleyball; Outside spiker, Alas Pilipinas - PH Men's Volleyball Team/Osaka Bluteon | Bronze medalist, Men's Volleyball, 2025 Southeast Asian Games)	
Ms. Volleyball	Bella Belen	Volleyball; Outside spiker, Alas Pilipinas - PH Women's Volleyball Team/Capital1 Solar Spikers | Silver medalist, AVC Women’s Volleyball Nation Cup	

==== Major awardees ====
Sorted by alphabetical order and based by surname.

Winner	Sport/Team/Recognition	References
Carlo Biado	Billiards; Champion, World Pool Championship and Billiards Congress of America Hall of Famer	
Chezka Centeno	Billiards; Champion, WPA World Ten-ball Championship	
"Don Julio"; Sire: Adios Reality; Dam: Guatemala; Jockey: Arnold "Apoy" P. Asuncion; Owner and Breeder: Felizardo "Jun" Sevilla, Jr. Trainer: Jesse B. Guce	Horse racing (Horse of the Year); Champion, 2025 Philippine Charity Sweepstakes Office (PCSO) Presidential Gold Cup	
Jonathan Basco Hernandez	Horse racing (Jockey of the Year); Top-Performing Jockey of 2025 by the Philippine Racing Commission (PHILRACOM)	
Melvin Jerusalem	Boxing; World Boxing Council (WBC) Mini-Flyweight Champion	
Jonas Magpantay	Billiards; Champion, Qatar World Cup 10-Ball Cup	
EJ Obiena	Athletics (Pole Vault); Gold Medalist, Men's Pole Vualt, Asian Athletics Championships and Champion, Atletang Ayala World Pole Vault Challenge	
Philippines men's curling team Marc Pfister, Enrico Pfister, Alan Frei, Christian Haller, and Benjo Delarmente	Curling; Gold Medalists, 2025 Asian Winter Games	
James Anthony Rabano	Horse racing (Horse Owner of the Year); Top-Performing Horse Owner of 2025 by the Philippine Racing Commission (PHILRACOM)	
Annie Ramirez	Jujutsu; Gold Medalist, Women's -57 kg, JJIF World Championships and 9th Asian Jiu-Jitsu Championships	
Miguel Tabuena	Golf; Champion, International Series Philippines	
Pedro Taduran	Billiards; International Boxing Federation (IBF) Mini-Flyweight Champion	

==== Citations ====
All 50 gold medalists of the 33rd Southeast Asian Games and 45 gold medalists of the 13th ASEAN Para Games head the distinguished roster of sports personalities set to receive citations at the awards night, joined by other sports figures who recorded significant achievements across various disciplines in 2025.

===== 2025 Southeast Asian Games gold medalists =====
Winner	Sport
Naomi Cesar	Athletics
John Cabang Tolentino	Athletics
Hokett delos Santos	Athletics
Hussein Loraña	Athletics
EJ Obiena	Athletics
Philippines men's baseball team	Baseball
Gilas Pilipinas Women (Philippines women's basketball team)	Basketball
Bernadeth Pons, Sisi Rondina, Dij Rodriguez, Sunny Villapando	Beach volleyball
Kenneth Chua, Marc Custodio, Art Barrientos, MJ San Jose	Bowling
Eumir Marcial	Boxing
Karl Nepomuceno, Sanford Vinuya, Kiel Soriano, Sanji Pabico, Jaypee Dela Cruz	ESports (Mobile Legends: Bang Bang)
Pilipinas Ultimate	Flying disc
Filipinas (Philippines women's football team)	Football
John Ivan Cruz	Gymnastics
Aleah Finnegan	Gymnastics
Jasmine Ramilo	Gymnastics
Kimberly Anne Custodio	Jiu-Jitsu
Dean Michael Roxas	Jiu-Jitsu
Chino Sy-Tancontian	Judo
Philippines mixed judo team	Judo
Zyra Bon-as	Kickboxing
Geli Bulaong	Mixed Martial Arts
Melvin Sacay	Modern Pentathlon
Michael Ver Comaling	Modern Pentathlon
Samuel German	Modern Pentathlon
Islay Erika Bomogao	Muaythai
LJ Rafael Yasay	Muaythai
Joanie Delgaco, Kristine Paraon	Rowing
Dhenver John Castillo	Sailing
Edcel Gino	Shooting
Erin Micor	Shooting
Genesis Pible	Shooting
Rolly Tecson	Shooting
Peter Groseclose	Short track speed skating
Mazel Paris Alegado	Skateboarding
Kiko Francisco	Skateboarding
RP Blu Boys (Philippines men's softball team)	Softball
RP Blu Girls (Philippines women's softball team)	Softball
Kayla Sanchez	Swimming
Kayla Sanchez, Chloe Isleta, Xiandi Chua, Heather White	Swimming
Justin Kobe Macario	Taekwondo
Tachiana Mangin	Taekwondo
Alex Eala	Tennis
Kira Ellis, Raven Alcoseba, Kim Mangrobang	Triathlon
Inaki Lorbes, Fer Casares, Matthew Hermosa	Triathlon
Kira Ellis, Fer Casares, Raven Alcoseba, Kim Remolino	Triathlon
Elreen Ando	Weightlifting
Gabriel Thomas Dinette	Wrestling
Jones Inso	Wushu
Agatha Wong	Wushu

===== 2025 ASEAN Para Games gold medalists =====
Winner	Sport
Ariel Alegarbes	Swimming
Arvie Arreglado	Athletics
Cendy Asusano	Swimming
Gary Bejino	Swimming
Darry Bernardo	Chess
Darry Bernardo, Menandro Redor, Arman Subaste	Chess
Evenizer Celebrado	Athletics
Francisco Ednaco, Jaime Manginga	Bowling
Marlyn Garrucho	Wheelchair fencing
Ernie Gawilan	Swimming
Kim Ian Chi, Patrick Eusebio	Bowling
Kyla Jane Langue	Chess
Henry Lopez, Jasper Rom, Sander Severino	Chess (Note: Posthumous award. Severino died on February 7, 2026)
Lhey Manginsay	Table Tennis
Alyana Nuñez	Athletics
Cyril Ongcoy	Athletics
Angel Otom	Swimming
Jan Jayro Palermo	Athletics
Rodrigo Podiotan, Jr.	Athletics
King James Reyes	Athletics
Joshua Santos	Athletics
Sander Severino	Chess
Marco Tinamisan	Swimming
Cleford Torcino	Athletics
Jesebel Tordecilla	Athletics

===== Non-Southeast Asian Games =====
Sorted by alphabetical order and based by surname.

Winner	Sport/Team/Recognition
Rubilen Amit	Billiards; Champion, Women’s Challenge of Champions, Kamui Las Vegas Open
Rogelio Antonio Jr.	Chess; Champion, FIDE World Senior Blitz Chess Championship
Carlos Baylon	Wushu; Bronze Medalist, Men's Sanda 56 kg, 2025 World Games
Darry Bernardo	Chess; Champion, Premier Open, 3rd Asian Chess Championships for Players with Disabilities
Sean Gibbons	Boxing; Boxing promoter and president, MP Promotions
Cheyzer Mendoza	Chess; Champion, Women's Blitz, 3rd Asian Chess Championships for Players with Disabilities
Jemaicah Mendoza	Chess; Bronze Medalist, Girls Under-14, World Youth Chess Championships
Joshua Pacio	Mixed martial arts Three-Time Champion, Men's Strawweight, ONE Championship
Philippines women's national ice hockey team	Ice hockey Champions, 2025 IIHF Women's Asia Cup
Regie Ramirez	Powerlifting; World Record Holder, Men's -59 kg Deadlift, World Open Equipped Championships
Jennifer Aimee Tan Uy	Ultramarathon; First Filipina to finish the Ultraman World Championship

==== Special awards ====
Gold medalists from the 2025 Asian Youth Games and 2025 Asian Youth Para Games, along with several champion teams, standout individuals, leagues, and organizations supporting Philippine Sports, will also be honored with special awards by the PSA during its annual Awards Night.

===== 2025 Asian Youth Games gold medalists =====
Winner	Sport
Pi Durden Forward Wangkay	Athletics
Isabella Joseline Butler	Jiu-jitsu
Charlie Ratcliff	Mixed martial arts
Zeth Gabriel Bueno	Muaythai
Tyron Jamborillo and Jan Brix Ramiscal	Muaythai
Lyre Anie Ngina	Muaythai
Kram Airam Carpio	Pencak silat

===== 2025 Asian Youth Para Games gold medalists =====
Winner	Sport
RJ Brucal	Para athletics
John Reyl Diano	Para athletics
Ric Daniel Pasadilla	Para athletics
Raemond Adefuin	Para swimming
Mary Hannah Brianna Diestro	Para swimming

===== Others =====
Sorted by alphabetical order and based by surname.

Winner	Sport/Team/Recognition
ArenaPlus SportsBook (Digiplus Interactive Corporation)	Online sports betting Major sponsor, International Series Philippines with Carlos Yulo and Miguel Tabuena served as ambassadors
Bank of the Philippine Islands (BPI) and Globe Telecom	Banking/telecommuncations; Supporter and main backer of Alex Eala's tennis journey
Fil-Am Invitational Golf Tournament	Golf; Celebrated its 75th diamond anniversary in 2025
Philippine Basketball Association (PBA)	Basketball; Celebrated its 50th golden anniversary in 2025
Philippines women's national beach volleyball team (Alas Pilipinas)	Beach volleyball Gold Medalists, Women's Beach Volleyball, 2025 Southeast Asian Games
Philippines women's national football team (Filipinas)	Football; Gold Medalists, Women's Football, 2025 Southeast Asian Games
Philippines men's national volleyball team (Alas Pilipinas)	Volleyball; 19th place, 2025 FIVB Men's Volleyball World Championship
J. R. Quiñahan	Basketball (Humanitarian Award); Power forward, Cebu Greats, Maharlika Pilipinas Basketball League (MPBL), rescued fellow survivors during the onslaught of Typhoon Kalmaegi (Tino) in Cebu.
Mikee Romero	Polo; Top-ranked Southeast Asia amateur polo player and team captain, Globalport Polo Team

==== Milo Philippines – Tony Siddayao Awards ====
The award is named in honor of Antonio "Tony" Siddayao, a former sports editor of the Manila Standard which was known as the Dean of Philippine Sportswriting. Sponsored by Milo Philippines, it is presented annually to outstanding junior national athletes aged 17 and below in recognition of their exceptional achievements and contributions to Philippine sports. Sorted by alphabetical order and based by surname.

Winner	Sport/Team/Recognition
Christian Gian Karlo Arca	Chess; Multiple gold medalist, Asian Youth Championships, Eastern Asia Youth Championships and ASEAN Age Group Championships
Jay-R Colonia	Weightlifting; Double gold and silver medalist, Boys 49 kg Youth, IWF World Youth and Junior Championships and bronze medalist, Asian Youth Games
Francesca Nicole Gan	Golf; Champion, girls class B, 31st Singapore Island Country Club Junior Invitational Golf Championship
Sophia Rose Garra	Swimming; Most outstanding swimmer and multiple gold medalist, 2025 Palarong Pambansa
Mikail Zachary Guico	Golf; Champion, Boys 7-years-old division, 2025 US Kids Golf World Championships
Bailey Cerda Heinsohn	Jiu-jitsu; Champion, Girls U14 -32kg Gi, Asian Jiu-jitsu Youth Championships, JJIF Junior Jiu-Jitsu World Championships
Leo Mhar Lobrido	Boxing; Gold medalist, Boys 46 kg, 4th Greater Bay Area Youth Boxing Championships and bronze medalist, 2025 Asian Youth Games, Asian Boxing U17 Championships
Tennielle Madis	Tennis; Champion, Girls Junior Doubles, J100 ITF World Tennis Tour Fujairah
Jemaicah Yap Mendoza	Chess; Multiple gold medalist, World Youth Championships, Eastern Asia Youth Championships and 2025 Batang Pinoy National Championships
Behrouz Mohammad Mojdeh	Swimming; Multiple medalist, Asian Open School Invitational Long Course Swimming Championships and Buccaneer Invitational
Royce Wayne Padua	Bowling; Champion, Youth Under 15, 49th MWA-Thailand International Open
Jhodie Peralta	Weightlifting; Silver and bronze medalist, Asian Youth Games and triple gold medalist, Girls 55 kg Youth, IWF World Youth and Junior Championships
Aerra JC Mae Relano	Squash; Champion, SEA Cup Squash Championships and 12th SICC International Jumbo Doubles Tournament
Patricia Mae Santor	Swimming; Most outstanding swimmer and multiple gold medalist, 2025 Batang Pinoy National Championships
Titus Dominic Sia	Swimming; Most outstanding swimmer and multiple gold medalist, 2025 Palarong Pambansa
Eldrew Yulo	Gymnastics; Bronze medalist, Boys floor exercise and horizontal bars, FIG Junior World Artistic Gymnastics Championships

==== Posthumous Honors ====
During the awards program, the organization offered a special tribute and remembrance to the sports personalities who died in 2025 and January–February 2026 through a one minute of silent prayer.

- Ashlyn Abong (Basketball)
- Elvin Abrea (Horse Racing)
- Freddie Abando (Sportscasting)
- Sammy Acaylar (Volleyball)
- Edwin Borja (Swimming)
- George Chua (Basketball)
- Juan Cutillas (Football)
- Narciso Dasigan (Athletics)
- Dennis Eroa (Sportswriting)
- Aurelio Jalmasco (Basketball)
- Israel Friday (Basketball)
- Cindy Imbo (Volleyball)
- Jimly Lantaya (Basketball)
- Alberto Lina (Cycling)
- Jimmy Mariano (Basketball)
- Robert Milton Calo (School Sports)
- Bruce McTavish (Boxing)
- Jonathan Penalosa (Boxing)
- Paquito Rivas (Cycling)
- Kentoy Sagura (Basketball)
- Marissa Sanchez (Tennis)
- PJ Santiago (Mountaineering)
- Sander Severino (Chess)
- Lovely Tababa (Football)
- Go Teng Kok (Athletics)

== See also ==
- 2025 in Philippine sports
