= Pedro Taduran vs. Christian Balunan =

2025 boxing match

Thrilla in Manila II Countdown
- Date: October 26, 2025
- Venue: San Andres Sports Complex, Manila, Philippines
- Title on the line: International Boxing Federation (IBF) mini-flyweight title.

Tale of the tape
Boxer	Pedro Taduran	Christian Balunan
Nickname	"Kid Pedro Heneral"	"Punchtian"
Hometown	Parañaque, Metro Manila, Philippines	Consolacion, Cebu, Philippines
Pre-fight record	18–4–1 (13 KO)	12–0 (7 KO)
Age	28 years, 11 months	23 years, 8 months
Height	5 ft 4 in (1.63 m)	5 ft 6 in (1.68 m)
Weight	104.3 lb (47 kg)	104.3 lb (47 kg)
Style	Southpaw	Orthodox
Recognition	IBF mini-flyweight world champion The Ring No. 2 ranked mini-flyweight TBRB No. 2 ranked mini-flyweight	IBF No. 1 ranked mini-flyweight

Result
- Taduran wins via unanimous decision (117–111 and 118–110 twice)

Pedro Taduran vs. Christian Balunan, billed as Thrilla in Manila II Countdown was a kickoff boxing event for the 50th Year Anniversary of the historic Thrilla in Manila between Muhammad Ali and Joe Frazier. The event is headlined between mini-flyweight champion Pedro Taduran and undefeated challenger Christian Balunan for the IBF mini-flyweight championship of the world on October 26, 2025.

== Background ==
On early September 2025, early hints and buildups were made between reigning IBF mini-flyweight champion Pedro Taduran and undefeated contender Christian Balunan, to serve as a prelude event for the Thrilla in Manila II, to be held on October 26, 2025, three days before the Thrilla in Manila II event, it was originally reported to be in a soon-to-be-announced Quezon City venue, where the Thrilla in Manila II will also be taking place.

On September 15, 2025, Viva Promotions officially announced the event on their Facebook page, it will take place on 26 October 2025, like said, but will instead take place in San Andres Sports Complex, Malate, Manila City, opposing the originally speculated Quezon City, the event will also be presented by MP Promotions, Limitless, Knuckleheads Pro Boxing Fraternity, and Elorde's Ultimate Knockout Challenge (UKC). The undercard includes previously returning Rex Tso and former OPBF champion Miel Fajardo in an IBF Pan Pacific-titled bouts separately, also in the undercard are Filipino prospects, notably Lienard Sarcon and AJ Paciones.

== Press Conference ==
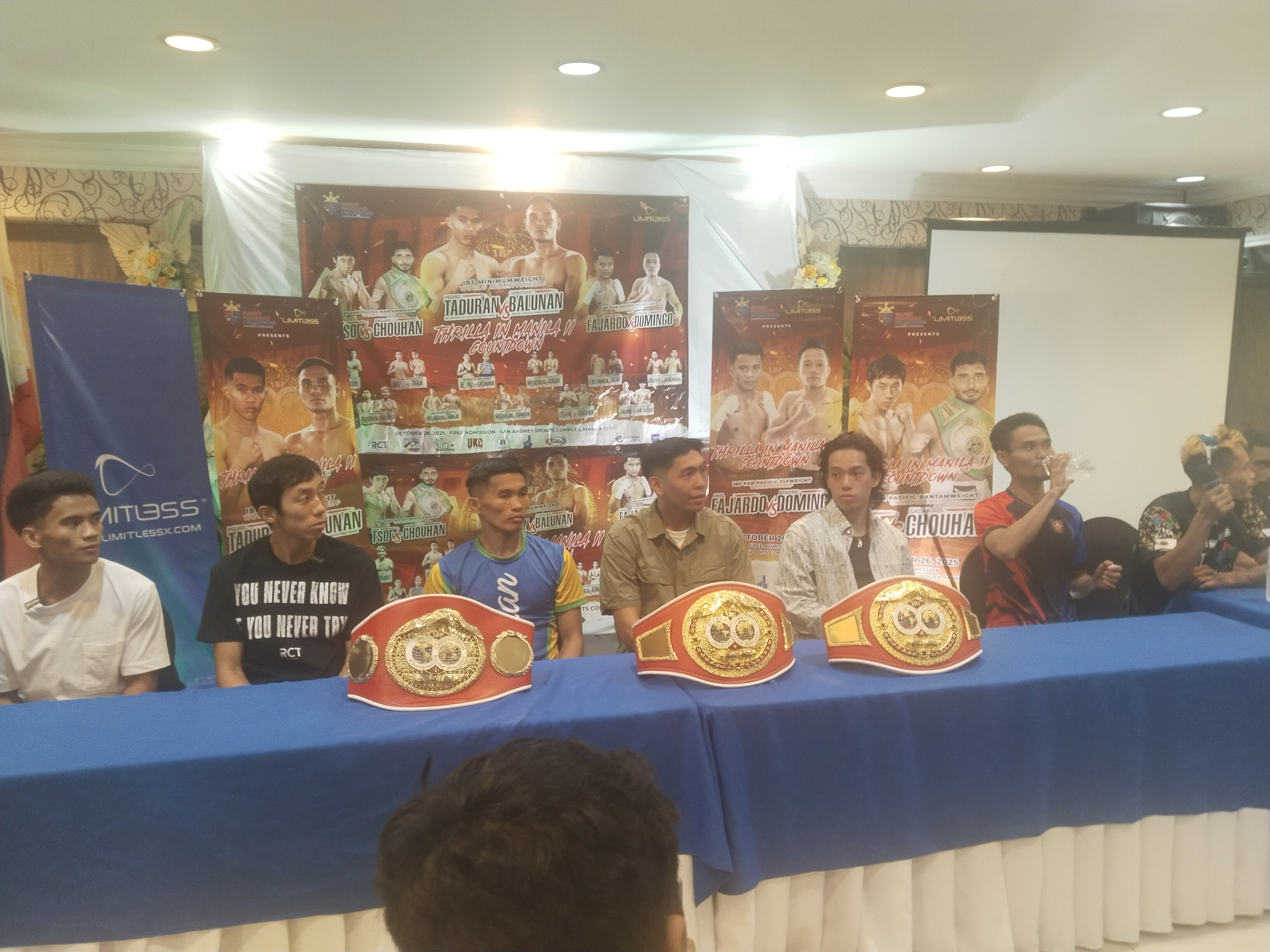
Thrilla in Manila II-Countdown Press Conference at the Orchid Garden Suite Manila Hotel in 2025.

The final weigh-in and press conference was held on Saturday October 25, 2025, at the Orchid Garden Suites in Malate, Manila and it will be broadcast live on Elorde TV on a YouTube channel. Both IBF mini-flyweight titleholder Taduran and his undefeated opponent Balunan came in under the 105lbs limit for their all-Filipino world title fight. Taduran and Balunan both came in at 104.3lbs for their 12-round fight, which will take place at San Andres Sports Complex in Malate, Philippines. The fight is the second title defense for the 28-year-old Taduran, who is in his second title reign after defeating Ginjiro Shigeoka twice in Japan. In the co-featured bout, Hong Kong boxer Rex "The Wonder Kid" Tso, will face India's undefeated boxer Sagar Chouhan. Tso weighed in at 117.7lbs for the ten-round bout, while Sagar was 118.4lbs.

"Sanay naman ako lumaban ng matangkad na 'tulad ni Balunan, maganda ang game plan namin ni coach Carl Peñalosa." ("I am used to fight tall guys like Balunan, we have great gameplan together with my coach Carl Peñalosa.") Said Taduran, confident that fans will witness an impressive performance. On the other hand, Balunan stated, "Sigurado ako, 100 percent na mananalo ako." (I am 100% sure, I will win.) Balunan said with conviction.

== Fight summary ==
In front of a crowd at San Andres Sport Complex, Pedro Taduran dominated Christian Balunan in their 12-round match, winning via unanimous decision to retain his IBF minimumweight title. The judges' scores were 118–110, 118–110, and 117–111, all in favor of Taduran. During the fight, Balunan suffered injuries and was visibly bloodied, especially after an accidental headbutt in the fourth round opened a cut on his face. Taduran's superior performance and ring generalship allowed him to dictate the pace and land significant blows, leading to his victory.

This win improved Taduran's record to 19–4–1, while Balunan suffered his first professional loss, dropping his record to 12–1.

=== CompuBox stats ===
Total	Taduran	Balunan
Thrown	953	404
Landed	160	73
Con. %	17%	18%

== Aftermath ==
Taduran is now focused on a unification fight after successfully defending his International Boxing Federation (IBF) minimum weight title against fellow Filipino Christian Balunan via lopsided unanimous decision at the San Andres Sports Complex in Manila.

"I want a unification fight," “I’m looking forward to facing Collazo,". "I will prepare hard for that unification, it’s going to be difficult, but it will be a dream to unify the belts." -Taduran stated

“Pedro’s performance is proof that he’s really longing for it," Gibbons said. "He really wants it, and he deserves the unification."

== Fight card ==
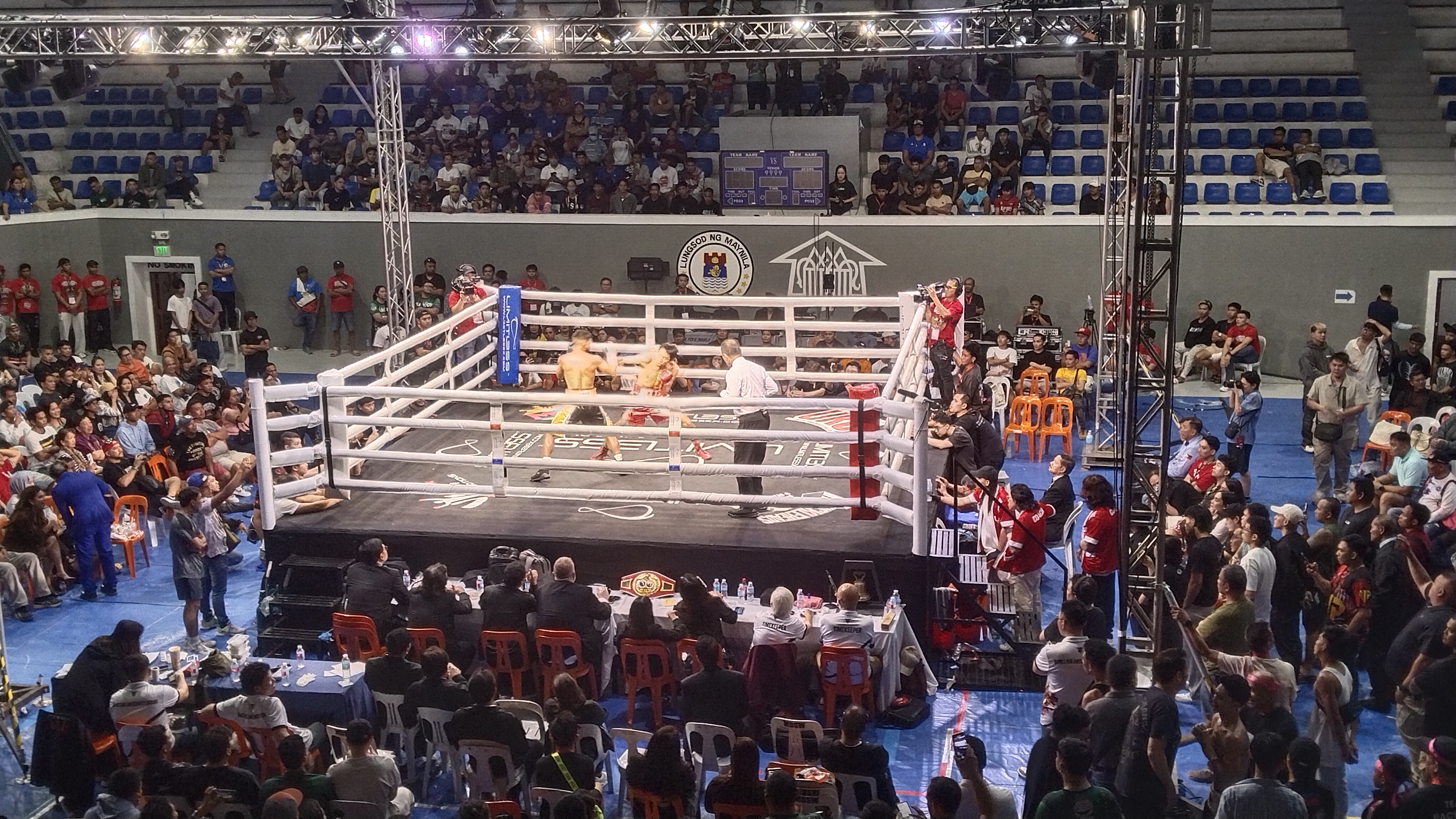
Match venue at San Andres Complex between Rex Tso and Sagar Chouchan in 2025.

Confirmed bouts:

Weight Class		vs.		Method	Round	Time	Notes
Mini-flyweight	(Philippines) Pedro Taduran (c)	def.	(Philippines) Christian Balunan	UD	12	3:00	^{Note 1}
Flyweight	(Philippines) Miel Fajardo	def.	(Philippines) Esneth Domingo	UD	10	3:00	^{Note 2}
Featherweight	(Philippines) Lienard Sarcon	def.	(Philippines) Junibert Bantay	TKO	6/10	1:23
Bantamweight	(Hong Kong) Rex Tso	draw	(India) Sagar Chouhan	TD	2 (10)	2:49	^{Note 3}^{Note 4}
Flyweight	(Philippines) Arvin Jhon Paciones	def.	(Philippines) Jeraldine Ocrarit	KO	2/8	2:25
Light-flyweight	(Philippines) Jhonel Lastimosa	draw	(Philippines) Anthony Galan	MD	6	3:00
Mini-flyweight	(Philippines) Carlo Diaz VII	def.	(Philippines) Joperson Trazo	UD	10	3:00
Mini-flyweight	(Philippines) Zyvyr John Medecilo	def.	(Philippines) Richard Garde	SD	8	3:00
Bantamweight	(Philippines) Argelou Samson	def.	(Philippines) Noli James Maquilan	TKO	8/8	0:44
Super flyweight	(Philippines) Claire Villarosa	def.	(Philippines) John Rey Labajo	KO	2/8	2:30	^{Note 5}
Bantamweight	(Philippines) Gretel De Paz	def.	(Philippines) Charimae Salvador	UD	8	3:00	^{Note 6}
Light-flyweight	(Philippines) Jerimy Balino	def.	(Philippines) Eljan Balagtas	UD	4	3:00
Mini-flyweight	(Philippines) Jian Denver Mananquil	def.	(Philippines) Mike Gerente	MD	4	3:00

^Note 1 For IBF mini-flyweight title
^Note 2 For vacant IBF Pan Pacific flyweight title
^Note 3 For vacant IBF Pan Pacific bantamweight title
^Note 4 Fight stopped after Chouhan was unable to continue due to a severe cut
^Note 5 For vacant GAB Youth super flyweight title
^Note 6 For vacant GAB female bantamweight title

== Event personnels ==
=== Broadcast team ===
Role	Name
Floor Director	John Paul Aguilar Concepcion
TV Director	Freddy Lorenzo Picardal
Commentator	Dennis Principe
Commentator	Noel Zarate
Ring announcer	Mark Anthony Lontayao
Ring announcer	Jaime Villanera
Official Photographer	Wendell Alinea
Official Photographer	Jay Otamias
Medical Team	Dr. Clark Joel Fernandez

Jay Otamias

=== Officials ===
Role	Name
Referee	Alfie Jocosol
Judges	Aqui Tamano
Judges	Gil Co
Judges	Oliver Garcia

=== Broadcasting ===
Country	Broadcaster
Philippines	Smart PH; Elorde TV; Puso Pilipinas

== See also ==
- Thrilla in Manila: The 50th Anniversary

Preceded by vs. Ginjiro Shigeoka	Pedro Taduran's bouts 26 October 2025	Succeeded by vs. TBA
Preceded by vs. Robert Paradero	Christian Balunan's bouts 26 October 2025	vs. TBA
