= MP Promotions =

Philippine boxing promotions

Manny Pacquiao Promotions
- Formation: 2006; 20 years ago
- Legal status: Active
- Purpose: Development and management of professional boxers
- Headquarters: Philippines
- Locations: General Santos, South Cotabato (Philippines); Beverly Hills, California (United States)
- Official language: Filipino & English
- Founder: Manny Pacquiao
- Founding president: Joe Ramos (until 2019)
- CEO: Jas Mathur (2025-present)
- Current president: Sean Gibbons (2019-present)
- Key people: See list: Tony Cohen (Vice President); Brendan Gibbons (Matchmaker); Art Monis (Matchmaker); JC Manangquil (Manager); JC Barrera (Social media head); Mark Anthony Lontayao (Liason Officer)
- Website: boxer.labhanya.com

Manny Pacquiao Promotions, abbreviated as MPP or MP Promotions, is a Philippine boxing promotion based in General Santos, South Cotabato, Philippines. Founded by eight-division world champion and International Boxing Hall of Fame 2025 inductee Manny Pacquiao in 2006, it is known for promoting prominent boxers from the Philippines, including world champions such as Mark Magsayo and John Riel Casimero, as well as Isaac Cruz.

In 2025, MP Promotions launched its United States branch headquartered in Beverly Hills, California under the leadership of President Sean Gibbons and Vice President Tony Cohen to expand the promotion's reach in the North and South America.

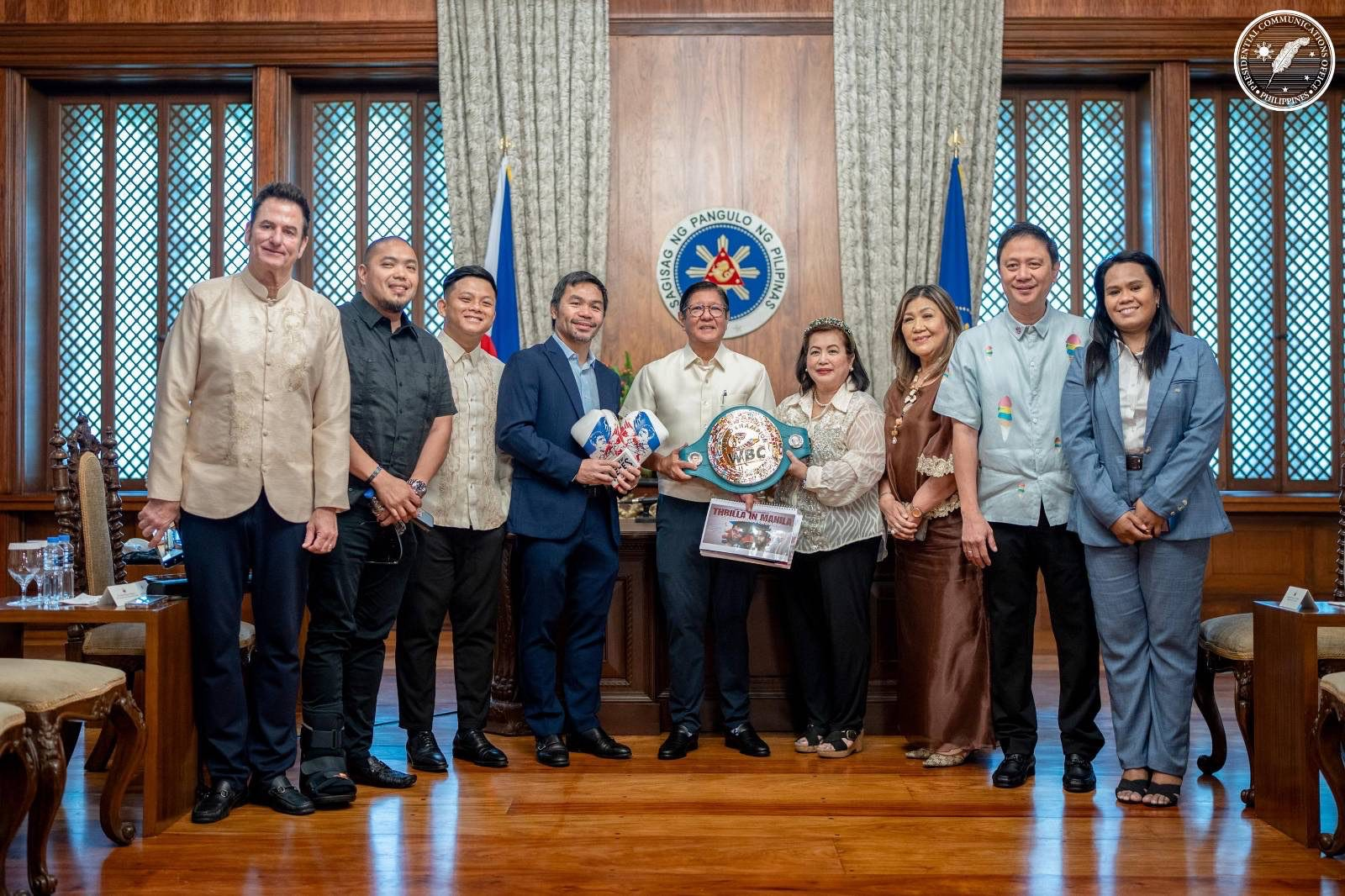
MP Promotions founder Manny Pacquiao, MP President Sean Gibbons (far left) and the team visits Philippine President Bongbong Marcos (center), in a courtesy call at Malacañang Palace on August 8, 2025.

== History ==
The company was established in 2006 founded by eight-division world champion and Boxing's Hall of Fame inductee Manny Pacquiao.Joe Ramos became its first official president until 2019 and was replaced by Sean Gibbons is currently the new president and its official matchmaker. The promotions aim is to help young aspiring boxers, especially in the Philippines.

MP Promotions promoted its first major event on July 2, 2006, where Pacquiao defended his WBC International super featherweight title against Óscar Larios which was held at the Araneta Coliseum in Quezon City, Philippines.

It is currently the biggest boxing promotion on the Philippines, following the unexpected closure of the fabled ALA Boxing, a Cebu-based boxing stable, after 35 years owing to the effects of the COVID-19 pandemic and the closure of longtime TV partner ABS-CBN. MP Promotions acts as a major umbrella promoter, advisor, and co-promoter working alongside stables like Viva Promotions, Knuckleheads Boxing, Elorde Boxing, Omega Boxing, and Sanman Boxing. MPP is also in partnership with TGB (Tom G. Brown) Promotions, Teiken Promotions, Ohashi Promotions, Zanfer Promotions, and (PBC) Premier Boxing Champions.

=== 2020s ===
On Oct 2, 2025, Manny Pacquiao launched the promotion's first ever official event headlined by Elijah Pierce vs. Lorenzo Parra in a 12-round WBO featherweight title eliminator, at the Pechanga Resort Casino in Temecula, California, United States. The fight also featured the pro boxing debut of Manny Pacquiao's son Jimuel, on a venture designed to reshape “the future of the sport he helped define”.

Pacquiao's long-time advisor Sean Gibbons served as the president while Tony Cohen is named as the chief financial officer and vice president. Cohen, a Hollywood executive, is leading the plans to take the promotion into new markets and media platforms. He is also developing a new pay-per-view platform to revolutionize the way combat sports content is delivered to global audiences. Mid December of 2025, Multidisciplinary entrepreneur Jas Mathur was officially appointed as the new as Chief Executive Officer of MP Promotions as part of a major leadership shift aimed at expanding events, developing fighters, and modernizing the organization.

== Notable events ==
=== Fight of Champions ===
MP Promotions signed up with Astro SuperSport, the Malaysia-based broadcasting group for the exclusive rights to air the “Fight of Champions” match between eight-time world boxing champion Manny Pacquiao and current WBA (Regular) welterweight champion Lucas Matthysse of Argentina, on July 15, 2018, at the Axiata Arena in Kuala Lumpur, Malaysia. It also featured three other world title fights in the undercard, and was broadcast live in over 100 countries worldwide, including the United States, South America, Europe, Africa, the Middle East, the Asia Pacific region, Caribbean and Oceania.

Pacquiao ended the bout in the seventh round when he floored Matthysse again for the TKO win – his first stoppage win since 2009, becoming the new WBA (Regular) welterweight champion.

=== Thrilla in Manila: The 50th Anniversary ===
On October 29, 2025, both the promotion and the Filipino TV program Blow by Blow presented an event that took place at the Araneta Coliseum, which also paid homage to the 50th anniversary of the original Thrilla in Manila 1975 fight between Muhammad Ali and Joe Frazier. The event was led by the reigning WBC mini-flyweight champion Melvin Jerusalem vs Siyakholwa Kuse, alongside some notable boxers under the MP Promotions banner such as the Olympic Bronze medalist Eumir Marcial, Carl Jammes Martin, former unified super bantamweight champion Marlon Tapales, as well as Nico Ali Walsh, the great-grandson of Muhammad Ali, who also participated in the event.

== Notable boxers ==
Note: Aside from being direct promotional contract some boxers were co-promoted and partner stable fighters. On special occations some sign a single-bout agreement to be headline or co-feature on specific MP Promotions events.

Name	Current Weight Class	Record	Notes
(Philippines) Carl Jammes Martin	Super-Bantamweight	29-0 (21 KO)	
(Philippines) Mark Anthony Barriga	Light-Flyweight	11-2 (2 KO)	
(Philippines) Garen Diagan	Minimumweight	10-8-1 (5 KO)	
(Philippines) Reymart Gaballo	Super-Bantamweight	31-2 (26 KO)	
(Philippines) Vincent Astrolabio	Bantamweight	20-6 (15 KO)	
(Philippines) Jhack Tepora	Featherweight	25-1 (19 KO)	
(Philippines) Jonas Sultan	Junior-Bantamweight	19-8 (11 KO)	
(Philippines) Eumir Marcial	Middleweight	8-0 (5 KO)	2020 Summer Olympics Bronze Medalist
(Philippines) Michael Dasmariñas	Bantamweight	36-5-2 (25 KO)	
(Philippines) Weljon Mindoro	Middleweight	17-1-1 (16 KO)	
(Philippines) Esneth Domingo	Bantamweight	23-5(14 KO)	
(Philippines) KJ Cataraja	Super-Flyweight	17-1(13 KO)	
(Philippines) Jade Bornea	Super-Flyweight	18-1 (12 KO)	
(Philippines) Giemel Magramo	Super-Flyweight	32-5 (24 KO)	
(Philippines) Arvin Magramo	Super-Flyweight	32-5 (24 KO)	
(Philippines) Arvin Jhon Paciones	Flyweight	14-0 (7 KO)	
(Philippines) Mark Vicelles	Light-Flyweight	21-3 (11 KO)	
(Philippines) Benny Canete	Light-Flyweight	13-3 (8 KO)	
(Philippines) Eman Bacosa	Lightweight	8-2-1 (5 KO)	
(United States) Lazaro Lorenzana	Middleweight	22-0 (13 KO)	

=== Affiliated World Champions ===
- (Philippines) Manny Pacquiao
- (Philippines) Rodel Mayol
- (Philippines) Marvin Sonsona
- (Philippines) John Riel Casimero
- (Philippines) Jerwin Ancajas
- (Philippines) Melvin Jerusalem
- (Philippines) Pedro Taduran
- (Philippines) Rene Mark Cuarto
- (Philippines) Mark Magsayo
- (Philippines) Marlon Tapales
- (Mexico) Isaac Cruz

==== Trainers ====
- Freddie Roach
- Buboy Fernandez
- Nonoy Neri
- Ting Ariosa
- Marvin Somodio
- Bobby McRoy
- Abel Martin
- Ernel Fontanilla
- Joven Jimenez
- Isaac Cruz Sr.

==== Announcers ====
- Mark Anthony "Silver Voice" Lontayao / Marc Yao
- Bobby Mondejar

== See also ==
- ALA Promotions
- Top Rank
- Blow by Blow (Philippine boxing program)
- Pedro Taduran vs. Christian Balunan
