= Sean Gibbons (promoter) =

American matchmaker and boxing promoter

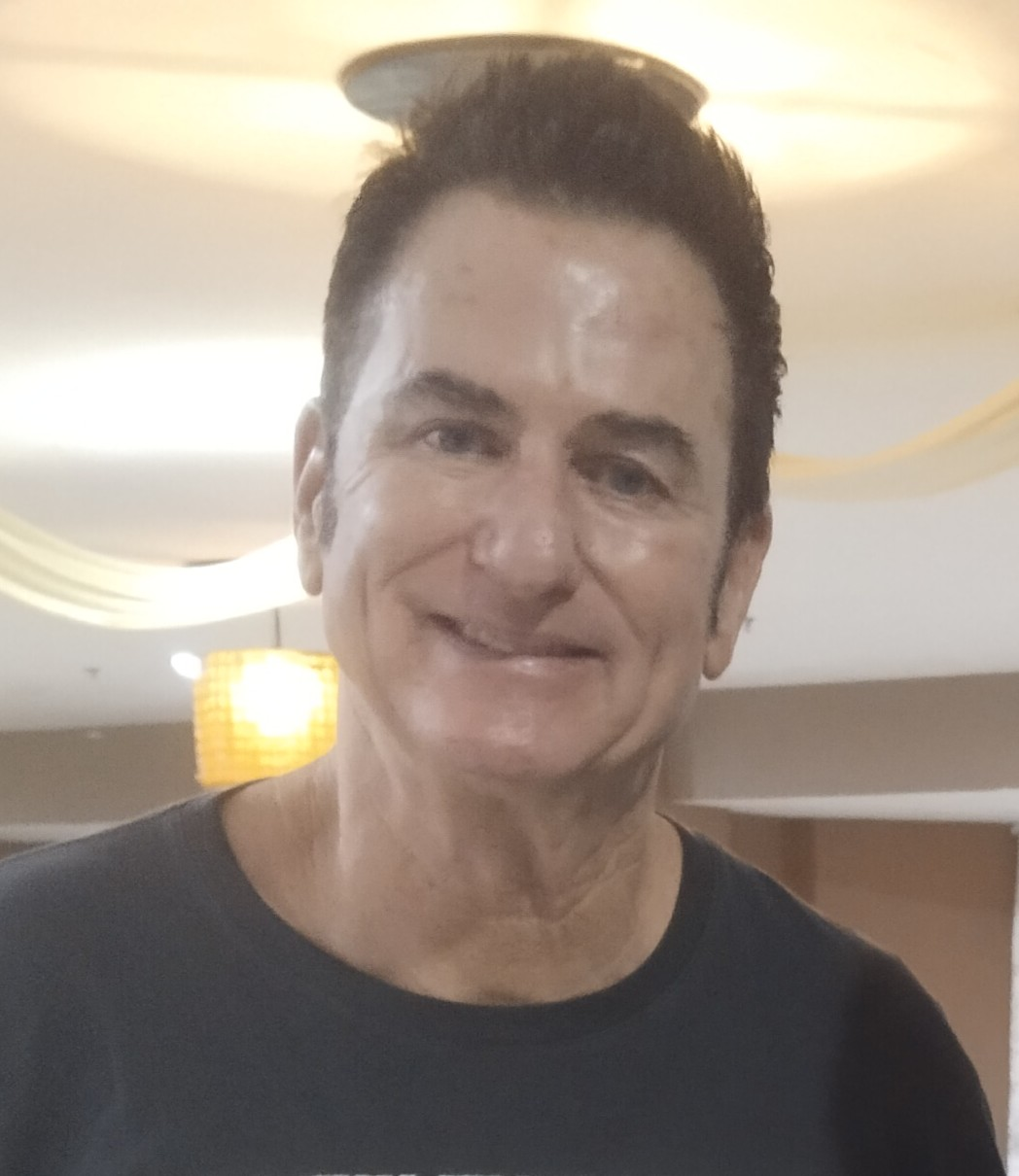
- Gibbons in 2025

Personal information
- Nicknames: The Mechanic; Mr. Everywhere; Jack of all trades
- Born: September 14, 1966 (age 60) Oklahoma City, Oklahoma, U.S.
- Weight: Light heavyweight
- Spouse: Valerie Thompson (m. 1997)
- Children: 2, including Brendan

Boxing career
- Stance: Orthodox

Boxing record
- Total fights: 25
- Wins: 14
- Win by KO: 9
- Losses: 7
- Draws: 3
- No contests: 1

Sean Gibbons (born November 14, 1966) is an American boxing promoter, matchmaker, former professional boxer and trainer. He has worked with over 50 world champions and directly representing 10 of them throughout his career. He is concurrently the president of Knuckleheads Pro Boxing Fraternity, The World Boxing Champions Promotions (WBCP), and Manny Pacquiao's MP Promotions since 2018.

== Background and early life ==
Gibbons spent most of his early years in Oklahoma. His father served in the United States Navy. He attended Moorpark College. He has been married to his wife, Valerie Thompson, since 1997 and has two children, including Brendan, who is also a boxing promoter.

== Boxing career ==
His uncle, Pat O'Grady, is the founder of World Athletic Association in 1981. He is the cousin of former WBA lightweight world champion Sean O'Grady. Gibbons boxed professionally from 1985 to 1996. He had a bout with actor Mickey Rourke on September 8, 1994, which ended in a draw. Gibbons had many of his early boxing matches in Oklahoma City. He boxed in the light heavyweight division. He holds wins over Mike Sykes, Mike Dunn and Nick Porter. He became a trainer and trained Ross Puritty his match with Tommy Morrison in 1994 which resulted in a draw with Puritty scoring two clean knockdowns against Morrison.

== Boxing promoter ==
Gibbons honed his craft and skills under Hall of Fame matchmaker Bruce Trampler at Bob Arum's Top Rank (1998-2004), then with Sycuan Ringside Promotions, before becoming an independent international matchmaker met with Manny Pacquiao in 2005, during one of Pacquiao's epic fights with Erik Morales. They became friends after that, Gibbons started helping match Pacquiao's undercard fighters in the likes of Bernabe Concepcion, and Ronnie Baldonado. Since 2018, he was appointed to be the President of MP Promotions and Knuckleheads Boxing. He has guided world champions like Jerwin Ancajas, Pedro Taduran, Marlon Tapales, Mark Magsayo, John Riel Casimero and Isaac Cruz.

== Professional boxing record ==
25 fights	14 wins	7 losses
By knockout	9	3
By decision	5	4
Draws	3	
No contests	1	

No.	Result	Record	Opponent	Type	Round, time	Date	Location	Notes
25	Loss	14–7–3 (1)	Peter H Madsen	KO	1/4	1996-09-13	Teater & Kongrescenter, Ringsted, Denmark	
24	Win	14–6–3 (1)	Scott Jones	PTS	4	1996-03-29	Miles City, U.S.	
23	Win	13–6–3 (1)	Scott Jones	TKO	3/?	1995-12-04	Des Moines, U.S.	
22	Loss	12–6–3 (1)	Ruediger May	KO	4/6	1995-09-09	Seidensticker Halle, Bielefeld, Germany	
21	Win	12–5–3 (1)	Nick Porter	KO	4/6	1995-06-05	Louisville, U.S.	
20	Loss	11–5–3 (1)	Anthony Davidson	UD	4	1995-02-16	University Club, Kansas City, U.S.	
19	Loss	11–4–3 (1)	Chris Horton	PTS	4	1994-09-13	Marriott Hotel, Kansas City, U.S.	
18	Draw	11–3–3 (1)	Mickey Rourke	MD	4	1994-09-08	Davie Arena, Davie, U.S.	
17	Win	11–3–2 (1)	John Hardin	PTS	4	1994-08-22	Louisville, U.S.	
16	Loss	10–3–2 (1)	Alex Ramos	TKO	5/8	1994-04-30	State Fair Park 4-H Building, Lincoln, U.S.	
15	NC	10–2–2 (1)	Chris Horton	NC-ND	4/?	1994-04-12	Ramada Inn Downtown, Topeka, U.S.	
14	Win	10–2–2	Mike Sykes	SD	4	1994-02-12	Executive Inn, Paducah, U.S.	
13	Win	9–2–2	Greg Reynolds	DQ	3/?	1993-09-11	Waubeek, U.S.	
12	Win	8–2–2	James Forrester	KO	3/?	1993-08-04	Marriott Hotel, Des Moines, U.S.	
11	Win	7–2–2	Nick Porter	KO	3/?	1993-07-22	University Plaza Hotel, Springfield, U.S.	
10	Win	6–2–2	Dale Luckett	KO	2/?	1993-07-19	Louisville, U.S.	
9	Win	5–2–2	Joe Haug	PTS	4	1993-02-23	Purcell, U.S.	
8	Loss	4–2–2	Mike Sykes	PTS	4	1992-11-07	National Guard Armory, Murray, U.S.	
7	Win	4–1–2	Lonnie Ramsey	TKO	3/?	1992-08-01	Denver, U.S.	
6	Win	3–1–2	Jackson Lee	TKO	3/?	1992-07-25	Hugo, U.S.	
5	Draw	2–1–2	Jeff Hobbs	PTS	4	1987-08-18	Trade Winds Central Inn, Oklahoma City, U.S.	
4	Draw	2–1–1	Mike Dunn	PTS	4	1987-02-17	Trade Winds Central Inn, Oklahoma City, U.S.	
3	Win	2–1	Mike Dunn	KO	3/4	1986-11-04	Trade Winds Central Inn, Oklahoma City, U.S.	
2	Win	1–1	Arn Hixon	KO	3/?	1986-10-07	Trade Winds Central Inn, Oklahoma City, U.S.	
1	Loss	0–1	Rich Misialek	MD	4	1985-11-05	Trade Winds Central Inn, Oklahoma City, U.S.	

== Honors ==
- 2026 - (PSA) Annual Awards Official Citation as formal recognition "Boxing promoter and president, MP Promotions" (for 2025).
- 2025 - Plaque of Recognition International Boxing Federation (IBF) "Most Active Promoter", MP Promotions.

== Filmography ==
TV documentary film
Year	Title	Role	Note	Reference
2025	I am Tommy Morrison	Himself	TV documentary – CFI Media	

== See also ==
- Manny Pacquiao vs. Lucas Matthysse
- Thrilla in Manila II Countdown
- Thrilla in Manila: The 50th Anniversary
