= 2011 WPA World Ten-ball Championship =

2011 world pool championship

2011 WPA World 10-Ball Championship
Tournament information
- Sport: Ten-Ball
- Location: Pasay, Metro Manila, Philippines
- Dates: May 9, 2011–May 15, 2011
- Tournament format: Round robin / Single Elimination
- Host: WPA World Ten-ball Championship
- Venue(s): Star Billiards Center, World Trade Center Metro Manila
- Participants: 128

Final positions
- Champion: (Netherlands) Huidji See
- Runner-up: (China) Fu Jianbo

The WPA 10-Ball World Championship 2011 was the third edition of the WPA World 10-ball Championship, the world championship for the discipline of 10-ball pool. It took place from May 9 to 15, 2011. The qualification phase was hosted at the Star Billiards Center, in Quezon City while the final tournament which started from May 10, 2011, was hosted at the World Trade Center Manila in Pasay.

Dutch Huidji See won the event, defeating China's Fu Jianbo in the final 11–8. The defending champion Mika Immonen lost in the last 64 round against Tomoo Takano.

== Format ==
The 128 participating players were divided into 16 groups, in which they competed in a double elimination tournament against each other. The remaining 64 players in each group qualified for the final round played in the knockout system. The event saw players from 44 different countries.

=== Prize money ===
Below was the advertised prize fund for the event.

Position	Prize
First place (champion)	$60,000
Second place (runner-up)	$30,000
Third place (semi-finalist)	$15,000
Fifth place (quarter-finalist)	$7,500
Ninth place (loser in round of 16)	$3,500
17th place (loser in round of 32)	$2,500
33rd place (loser in round of 64)	$1,000

== Knockout round ==
Round of 64
(Chinese Taipei) Chang Yu-Lung	9
(Malaysia) Imran Ibrahim	1
(United States) Johnny Archer	9
(China) Liu Haitao	6
(Sweden) Marcus Chamat	6
(England) Chris Melling	9
(Portugal) Manuel Pereira	9
(Philippines) Antonio Gabica	8
(Japan) Yukio Akakariyama	9
(Malaysia) Ibrahim Bin Amir	2
(Germany) Sascha Tege	9
(Ukraine) Artem Koshovyi	5
(England) Darren Appleton	9
(Chinese Taipei) Ko Ping-chung	8
(Japan) Tomoo Takano	9
(Finland) Mika Immonen	7
(Canada) Jason Klatt	9
(Chinese Taipei) Fu Che-wei	5
(India) Alok Kumar	9
(Germany) Thomas Engert	7
(Japan) Naoyuki Ōi	6
(Germany) Oliver Ortmann	9
(Spain) David Alcaide	6
(Malta) Tony Drago	9
(Philippines) Jeff de Luna	3
(Indonesia) Ricky Yang	9
(Netherlands) Huidji See	9
(Venezuela) Jalal Yousef	3
(Australia) James Delahunty	4
(Chinese Taipei) Ko Pin-yi	9
(China) Dang Jinhu	9
(Croatia) Karlo Dalmatin	6
(Philippines) Dennis Orcollo	9
(Canada) Mario Morra	4
(England) Karl Boyes	9
(Spain) Francisco Sánchez	3
(China) Wu Jia-qing	9
(China) Wang Ming	7
(Philippines) Jonas Magpantay	6
(Japan) Lo Li-wen	9
(Philippines) Roberto Gomez	6
(Philippines) Carlo Biado	9
(Philippines) Demosthenes Pulpul	2
(Philippines) Ronato Alcano	9
(Philippines) Venancio Tanio	7
(United States) Shane Van Boening	9
(Kuwait) Omar Al-Shaheen	8
(England) Daryl Peach	9
(France) Stephan Cohen	4
(China) Han Haoxiang	9
(Philippines) Lee Vann Corteza	9
(Chinese Taipei) Chan Lu Hui	5
(Vietnam) Chi Dung Luong	3
(China) Li Hewen	9
(Indonesia) Muhammad Zulfikri	4
(Netherlands) Nick van den Berg	9
(China) Fu Jianbo	9
(Chinese Taipei) Kuo Po-cheng	7
(Philippines) Marvin Tapia	8
(Chinese Taipei) Liu Cheng-chieh	9
(Philippines) Jericho Banares	5
(Philippines) Jundel Mazon	9
(South Korea) Park Shin-yong	9
(Croatia) Ivica Putnik	3

Round of 32
(Chinese Taipei) Chang Yu-Lung	9
(United States) Johnny Archer	7
(England) Chris Melling	9
(Portugal) Manuel Pereira	4
(Japan) Y. Akakariyama	9
(Germany) Sascha Tege	7
(England) Darren Appleton	5
(Japan) Tomoo Takano	9
(Canada) Jason Klatt	9
(India) Alok Kumar	7
(Germany) Oliver Ortmann	6
(Malta) Tony Drago	9
(Indonesia) Ricky Yang	7
(Netherlands) Huidji See	9
(Chinese Taipei) Ko Pin-yi	9
(China) Dang Jinhu	7
(Philippines) Dennis Orcollo	9
(England) Karl Boyes	7
(China) Wu Jia-qing	9
(Japan) Lo Li-wen	8
(Philippines) Carlo Biado	9
(Philippines) Ronato Alcano	1
(United States) Shane Van Boening	6
(England) Daryl Peach	9
(China) Han Haoxiang	4
(Philippines) Lee Vann Corteza	9
(China) Li Hewen	9
(Netherlands) Nick van den Berg	6
(China) Fu Jianbo	9
(Chinese Taipei) Liu Cheng-chieh	3
(Philippines) Jundel Mazon	8
(South Korea) Park Shin-yong	9

Round of 16
(Chinese Taipei) Chang Yu-Lung	8
(England) Chris Melling	9
(Japan) Y. Akakariyama	9
(Japan) Tomoo Takano	5
(Canada) Jason Klatt	5
(Malta) Tony Drago	9
(Netherlands) Huidji See	9
(Chinese Taipei) Ko Pin-yi	6
(Philippines) Dennis Orcollo	9
(China) Wu Jia-qing	8
(Philippines) Carlo Biado	9
(England) Daryl Peach	4
(Philippines) Lee Vann Corteza	9
(China) Li Hewen	4
(China) Fu Jianbo	9
(South Korea) Park Shin-yong	7

Quarterfinal
(England) Chris Melling	6
(Japan) Y. Akakariyama	9
(Malta) Tony Drago	4
(Netherlands) Huidji See	9
(Philippines) Dennis Orcollo	4
(Philippines) Carlo Biado	9
(Philippines) Lee Vann Corteza	8
(China) Fu Jianbo	9

Semifinal
(Japan) Y. Akakariyama	6
(Netherlands) Huidji See	9
(Philippines) Carlo Biado	5
(China) Fu Jianbo	9

Final
(Netherlands) Huidji See	11
(China) Fu Jianbo	8
