= Samuel Salva =

Filipino boxer

Personal information
- Nickname: Silent Assassin
- Nationality: Filipino
- Born: Samuel G. Salva; 11 February 1997 (age 29) Gingoog, Philippines
- Height: 5 ft 1 in (155 cm)
- Weight: Mini-flyweight; Light-flyweight

Boxing career
- Stance: Orthodox

Boxing record
- Total fights: 25
- Wins: 22
- Win by KO: 14
- Losses: 3

Samuel Salva (born February 11, 1997) is a Filipino professional boxer. He is a one-time world title challenger, having fought for the IBF mini-flyweight title in 2019.

== Professional boxing career ==
Salva defeated Rene Mark Cuarto on March 23, 2019, in an IBF world title eliminator, by unanimous decision. Two of the judges scored the fight 116–112 in his favor, while the third judge scored it 117–111 for him

On September 7, 2019, he fought Pedro Taduran for the IBF mini-flyweight world title, losing by technical knockout in the 4th round despite knocking Taduran down in the 1st round. He had to be carried out on a stretcher after the fight and required a hospital stay. The fight was broadcast delayed on BoxNation. The Taduran-Salva title fight was the first all-Filipino title fight in the Philippines in 94 years.

Salva faced fellow former world title challenger Jeffrey Galero on April 30, 2022, following a 27-month absence from the sport. He won the fight by a first-round knockout, stopping Galero with just 14 seconds left in the opening round.

== Professional boxing record ==
| 25 fights | 22 wins | 3 losses |
|---|---|---|
| By knockout | 15 | 1 |
| By decision | 7 | 2 |

| No. | Result | Record | Opponent | Type | Round, time | Date | Location | Notes |
|---|---|---|---|---|---|---|---|---|
| 25 | Win | 22–3 | Jake Rosal | KO | 1 (6) | 16 May 2026 | Bonifacio Naval Station Covered Court, Taguig, Philippines | |
| 24 | Loss | 21–3 | Siyakholwa Kuse | UD | 10 | 31 May 2025 | Emperors Palace, Kempton Park, South Africa | |
| 23 | Win | 21–2 | Eldin Guinahon | KO | 2 (10), 1:55 | 25 Jan 2025 | Iligan City Public Plaza, Iligan, Philippines | |
| 22 | Loss | 20–2 | Yudai Shigeoka | UD | 10 | 28 Aug 2024 | Yamato Arena, Suita, Japan | |
| 21 | Win | 20–1 | Jayson Francisco | TKO | 1 (6) | 8 Oct 2023 | Iligan City Public Plaza, Iligan, Philippines | |
| 20 | Win | 19–1 | Jeffrey Galero | KO | 1 (8), 2:46 | Apr 30, 2022 | Dangcagan, Philippines | |
| 19 | Win | 18–1 | Donny Mabao | TKO | 7 (8), 2:17 | Jan 19, 2020 | Central Market Gym, Iligan, Philippines | |
| 18 | Loss | 17–1 | Pedro Taduran | RTD | 4 (12), 3:00 | Sep 7, 2019 | Jurado Hall of the Philippine Marine Corp, Taguig, Philippines | For IBF mini-flyweight title |
| 17 | Win | 17–0 | Rene Mark Cuarto | UD | 12 | Mar 23, 2019 | Resorts World Hotel, Pasay, Philippines | |
| 16 | Win | 16–0 | Jason Mopon | TKO | 7 (8), 1:51 | Nov 25, 2018 | Iligan City Public Plaza, Iligan, Philippines | |
| 15 | Win | 15–0 | Ryan Ralozo | UD | 6 | Jul 8, 2018 | Barangay Poblacion Covered Court, Iligan, Philippines | |
| 14 | Win | 14–0 | Oliver Gregorio | UD | 6 | May 13, 2018 | SM City North EDSA Skydome, Quezon, Philippines | |
| 13 | Win | 13–0 | Jason Mopon | TKO | 2 (8), 1:16 | Mar 24, 2018 | Barangay Maranding, Lala, Lanao del Norte, Philippines | |
| 12 | Win | 12–0 | Jason Mopon | TKO | 3 (8), 1:51 | Dec 3, 2017 | Iligan City Public Plaza, Iligan, Philippines | |
| 11 | Win | 11–0 | Marco John Rementizo | TKO | 1 (8), 2:57 | Oct 15, 2017 | Robinsons Place Iligan, Iligan, Philippines | Won MinProBA mini-flyweight title |
| 10 | Win | 10–0 | Donny Mabao | TKO | 8 (10), 1:06 | Aug 6, 2017 | Barangay Saint Felomina Covered Court, Iligan, Philippines | |
| 9 | Win | 9–0 | Donny Mabao | UD | 10 | May 31, 2017 | Barangay Santa Filomena Covered Court, Iligan, Philippines | |
| 8 | Win | 8–0 | Raymon Dayham | KO | 9 (10), 1:28 | Mar 28, 2017 | Barangay Santa Filomena Covered Court, Iligan, Philippines | |
| 7 | Win | 7–0 | Jocel Gamalo | TKO | 7 (8) | Feb 11, 2017 | Kabasalan Municipal Gym, Kabasalan, Philippines | |
| 6 | Win | 6–0 | Roland Jay Biendima | MD | 6 | Dec 8, 2016 | Kibawe Gym, Kibawe, Philippines | |
| 5 | Win | 5–0 | Ryan Ralozo | TKO | 4 (8) | Aug 20, 2016 | Aurora Municipal Gym, Baler, Aurora, Philippines | |
| 4 | Win | 4–0 | John Leo Galleposo | UD | 6 | Jun 15, 2016 | Sirawai Gym, Sirawai, Philippines | |
| 3 | Win | 3–0 | Jomar Caindog | UD | 6 | Apr 30, 2016 | Central Market Gym, Iligan, Philippines | |
| 2 | Win | 2–0 | Marvin Mapa | RTD | 4 | Mar 13, 2016 | Central Market Gym, Iligan, Philippines | |
| 1 | Win | 1–0 | Michael Dopol | TKO | 1 (4), 2:03 | Jan 31, 2016 | Iligan City Public Plaza, Iligan, Philippines | |
