= Lienard Sarcon =

Filipino boxer (born 2000)

Personal information
- Nicknames: The Matrix; Triggerman
- Born: March 21, 2000 (age 26) General Santos, Cotabato, Philippines
- Height: 1.73 m (5 ft 8 in)
- Weight: Flyweight; Super flyweight; Bantamweight; Featherweight

Boxing career
- Reach: 170 cm (67 in)
- Stance: Southpaw

Boxing record
- Total fights: 15
- Wins: 15
- Win by KO: 7
- Losses: 0

Lienard Sarcon (born 21 March 2000) is a Filipino professional boxer who has held the Games and Amusements Board (GAB) featherweight title since 2026.

== Early life ==
After being victorious in his UBS bantamweight tournament semi-final match, Sarcon was documented, where it was revealed that he had a rough childhood. Sarcon never knew his father, caused by his father abandoning him at birth. Someone claimed that his father is former boxer Aniceto Rabacal, who had no records nor data of being a boxer. At 9 years old, Sarcon was ultimately abandoned by his mother Julie, whom, during his July 8 bout in Quezon City, claimed that it was false. In reality, however, Sarcon, by then, has not seen his mother for a decade, Sarcon had been left to fend off on his own, sleeping in jeepneys, surviving on instinct and finding company with troublesome teenage gangs. Sarcon stated that he was also close to his half-brother Jason Kim, whose father is Korean, however, he did not know who his three other half-siblings are.

At 12 years old, as a delinquent, Sarcon and his gangmates were throwing buckets of water on passengers in moving jeepneys, causing trouble. Suddenly, a motorcycle rammed Sarcon unconscious to the ground. Sarcon was sent to the hospital, where he ended up with a neck brace and stitches on his left pinky finger, facing a near-death experience, he was confined for a week.

Two years after the accident, Sarcon was invited to a boxing gym by trainer Albert Gaballo, who, in goal, transformed Sarcon from a delinquent to a boxer, ultimately starting his boxing career and passion. He later grew to 5 foot 8 inches with a 67-inch wingspan.

== Professional career ==
=== Flyweight ===
==== Debut ====
Sarcon made his professional debut on October 8, 2017, against fellow debutant Ramil Yacapin at the Mayor Vitaliano D. Agan Coliseum in Zamboanga City. Sarcon debuted as a flyweight, both competitors weighed in at 109 pounds. Sarcon via first-round TKO.

=== Bantamweight ===
==== UBS Bantamweight Tournament ====
After composing a record of 4 wins, 0 losses and 1 KO. Sarcon was chosen to participate in the Ultimate Boxing Series (UBS): Kamaong Pinoy, a program created by ESPN 5 and GerryPens Promotion, (promotion of two-time world champion Gerry Peñalosa) in hopes to find the best up-and-comer, and eventual top boxing prospect in the Philippines. He was placed in the bantamweight tournament.

On May 23, 2019, he was scheduled against 6–1–1 Rimon Rama at the TV5 Studio in Novaliches, Quezon City, Philippines. Sarcon won via fourth-round RTD. Advancing to the semi-finals.

On July 8, Sarcon defeated 3–0 Gary Tamayo in the same venue via split decision, during the event, Sarcon's mother Julie caused a scene by attending the event, despite Lienard having yet to see her for a decade. Where she later insisted that she did not abandon Lienard.

At the finals on August 25, 2019, Sarcon fought 9–0 Aljum Pelesio in the same venue. Sarcon used his height and reach to his advantage, eventually, defeating Pelesio by majority decision with the scorecards of 76–76, 77–75 and 78–74. Alongside the tournament, he also won the UBS bantamweight championship.

=== Featherweight ===
==== Sarcon vs. Kang ====
In August 2022, it was announced that Sarcon was scheduled to face undefeated favourite South Korean, reigning WBO Oriental featherweight champion Jong Seon Kang for the vacant WBA Asia featherweight title on September 4 in Siheung, South Korea. This would mark Sarcon's debut outside of the Philippines. Sarcon scored an upset, winning by unanimous decision, dropping Kang once and being the more skilled fighter that night. The judges scored it 96–95 and 96–93 twice, all in favour of Sarcon.

==== Sarcon vs. Gonzalez ====
After more than a year of hiatus, Sarcon returned against 12–4 American Frank Gonzalez to make Sarcon's United States debut on December 9, 2023, at Thunder Studios in Long Beach, California. Sarcon dominated the bout, with the judges scoring it 79–73 and 80–72 twice for Sarcon, winning via lopsided unanimous decision.

On March 23, 2024, at the Ninoy Aquino Stadium, in the undercard of the Eumir Marcial-Thoedsak Sinam "homecoming" card. Sarcon defeated Chinese Peng Huang by unanimous decision.

==== Sarcon vs. Bantay ====
At the Thrilla in Manila II Countdown, an event serving as a countdown for the Thrilla in Manila II event, which commemorates and celebrates the 50th annual anniversary of historic Thrilla in Manila event between Muhammad Ali and Joe Frazier, Sarcon was scheduled to face against 9–0 compatriot Junibert Bantay. Their bout was scheduled for ten rounds on October 26, 2025, in Manila, Philippines. Sarcon won via seventh-round TKO.

==== Sarcon vs. Geraldo ====
On January 10, 2026, in Cebu City, Philippines, Sarcon was scheduled to face multiple-time regional contender and challenger, veteran Mark Anthony Geraldo for the vacant Games and Amusements Board (GAB) featherweight title. Sarcon won via swift first-round TKO after dropping Geraldo thrice, his opponent's corner stepped in the ring and ultimately, halted the bout.

== Professional boxing record ==
15 fights	15 wins	0 losses
By knockout	7	0
By decision	8	0

No.	Result	Record	Opponent	Type	Round, time	Date	Location	Notes
15	Win	15–0	Mark Anthony Geraldo	TKO	1 (12), 2:51	10 Jan 2026	Nustar Resort and Casino, Cebu City, Philippines	Won vacant Philippines GAB featherweight title
14	Win	14–0	Junibert Bantay	TKO	7 (10), 1:23	26 Oct 2025	San Andres Sports Complex, Manila, Philippines	
13	Win	13–0	Jason Dogelio	KO	2 (8), 2:37	21 Dec 2024	District of Calinan, Davao City, Philippines	
12	Win	12–0	Huang Peng	UD	8	23 Mar 2024	Ninoy Aquino Stadium, Manila, Philippines	
11	Win	11–0	Frank Gonzalez	UD	8	9 Dec 2023	Thunder Studios, Long Beach, California, U.S.	
10	Win	10–0	Kang Jong-seon	UD	10	4 Sep 2022	Tech University of Korea, Siheung, South Korea	Won vacant WBA Asia featherweight title
9	Win	9–0	Ian Ligutan	RTD	1 (8), 3:00	6 Feb 2022	Digos, Davao del Sur, Philippines	
8	Win	8–0	Mark Glen Antaran	RTD	3 (8), 3:00	27 Feb 2021	Bula Gym, General Santos, Philippines	
7	Win	7–0	Aljum Pelesio	MD	8	25 Aug 2019	TV5 Studio, Quezon City, Philippines	Won UBS bantamweight title; Ultimate Boxing Series: Bantamweight finals
6	Win	6–0	Gary Tamayo	SD	6	8 Jul 2019	TV5 Studio, Quezon City, Philippines	Ultimate Boxing Series: Bantamweight semifinals
5	Win	5–0	Rimon Rama	RTD	4 (6), 3:00	23 May 2019	TV5 Studio, Quezon City, Philippines	Ultimate Boxing Series: Bantamweight quarterfinals
4	Win	4–0	Jessie James Boyles	UD	4	21 Aug 2018	Gaisano Mall of Toril, Davao City, Philippines	
3	Win	3–0	Rudy Salaton	MD	4	25 Mar 2018	Gaisano Mall of Toril, Davao City, Philippines	
2	Win	2–0	Jerry Tabago	UD	4	17 Dec 2017	Robinson's Mall Atrium, General Santos, Philippines	
1	Win	1–0	Ramil Yacapin	TKO	1 (4), 2:51	8 Oct 2017	Mayor Vitaliano D. Agan Coliseum, Zamboanga City, Philippines	
