= Mila Emperado =

Filipino chess player (born 1947)

Personal information
- Full name: Milagros Codiñera Emperado
- Born: 1947 (age 78–79)

Chess career
- Country: Philippines
- Peak rating: 2005 (April 2003)

Milagros Codiñera Emperado is a Filipino chess player who was part of the Philippines' first women's team at the Chess Olympiad in 1976.

== Early life and education ==
Milagros Emperado was born in 1947. She learned how to play chess at six years old from her father and uncle. Emperado attended the Mapúa Institute of Technology for college. She worked in the chemistry field after graduating before pursuing a master's degree in teaching.

== Career ==
Emperado joined the Mapúa chess team in college. Later as a college educator, she was encouraged to join a national chess tournament earning her a place to represent the country internationally.

Emperado was part of the first all-women Philippines team at the Chess Olympiad which took part at the 22nd Chess Olympiad in Haifa, Israel in 1976. Her teammates were Hermie Cartel, Andrea Lizares, and Lita Alvarez. They finished 16th out of 22 women's teams. She held the title Woman National Master.

Emperado is the founding president of the Metropolitan Chess Club (MCC). In 1990, the MCC started organizing the Milo Checkmate Chess Clinic. The MCC has produced Wesley So.

Emperado was given the Lifetime Award at the 2026 PSA Annual Awards.
