= Siyakholwa Kuse =

South African boxer (born 2003)

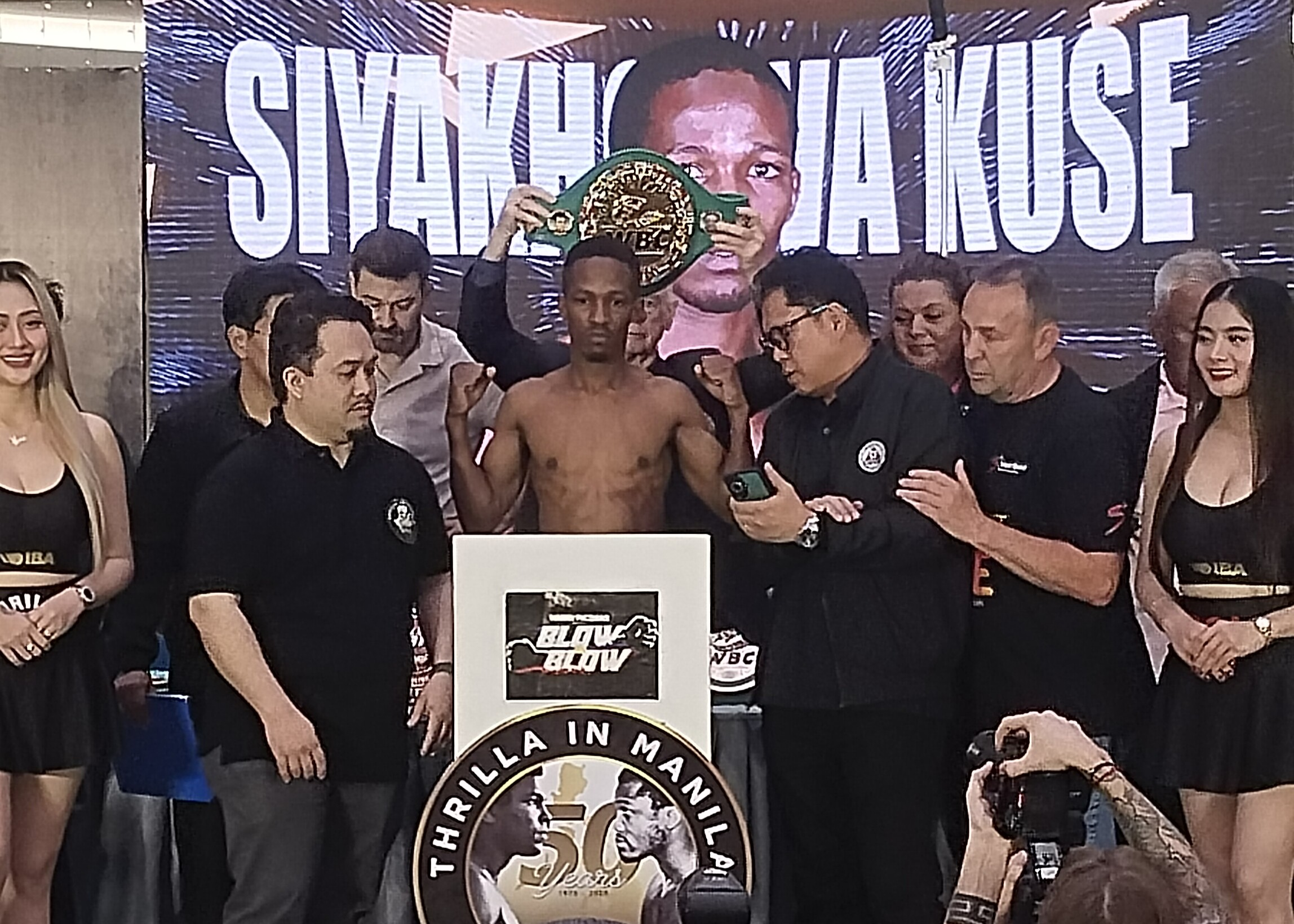
- Kuse during the ceremonial weigh-in at Gateway Mall 2, Quantum Skyview, Cubao, Quezon City, Philippines 2025

Personal information
- Nationality: South African
- Born: 13 July 2003 (age 23)
- Height: 5 ft 3 in (160 cm)
- Weight: Mini flyweight

Boxing career
- Stance: Southpaw

Boxing record
- Total fights: 14
- Wins: 10
- Win by KO: 4
- Losses: 3
- Draws: 1

Siyakholwa Kuse (born 13 July 2003) is a South African professional boxer. He has held the World Boxing Council (WBC) mini-flyweight title since May 2026.

== Amateur career ==
=== Commonwealth Youth Games ===
2017

- 1st round bye
- Defeated Tiholohelo Mokhesi (Lesotho) RSC (1/3 x 2)
- Lost to Sachin Siwach Singh (India) UD (3/3 x 2) (claim bronze medal)

== Professional career ==
=== Kuse vs Salva ===
Kuse's set to face a non-title 10-rounder against Samuel Salva from the Philippines on the Emperors Palace, Kempton Park, South Africa on May 31, 2025 Despite absorbing a round 1 knocked down Kuse was able to win against Salva via Unanimous decision.

=== First title challenge ===
==== Kuse vs Jerusalem ====
===== Thrilla in Manila: 50th Anniversary =====
Kuse fought WBC mini-flyweight champion Melvin Jerusalem on 29 October 2025, in an MP Promotions event billed "Thrilla in Manila: 50th anniversary" at Araneta Coliseum, Cubao, Quezon City, Philippines. It is meant as the 50th anniversary commemoration of the original Thrilla in Manila 1975 fight between Muhammad Ali and Joe Frazier. Kuse lost by unanimous decision.

==== Kuse vs Jerusalem 2 ====
A rematch between Kuse and Jerusalem took place at Emperors Palace in Kempton Park, South Africa, on 16 May 2026. Kuse won by unanimous decision to claim the WBC mini-flyweight title.

== Professional boxing record ==
14 fights	10 wins	3 losses
By knockout	4	0
By decision	6	3
Draws	1	

No.	Result	Record	Opponent	Type	Round, time	Date	Location	Notes
14	Win	10–3–1	Melvin Jerusalem	UD	12	May 16, 2026	Emperors Palace, Kempton Park, South Africa	Won WBC mini-flyweight title
13	Loss	9–3–1	Melvin Jerusalem	UD	12	Oct 29, 2025	Araneta Coliseum, Quezon City, Philippines	For WBC mini-flyweight title
12	Win	9–2–1	Samuel Salva	UD	10	May 31, 2025	Emperors Palace, Kempton Park, South Africa	
11	Win	8–2–1	Beaven Sibanda	MD	12	Dec 6, 2024	Emperors Palace, Kempton Park, South Africa	Won vacant WBC Silver mini-flyweight title
10	Win	7–2–1	Malakhi Sobolo	KO	5 (12)	Aug 25, 2024	Orient Theatre, East London, South Africa	Retained South African mini-flyweight title
9	Win	6–2–1	Halid Kalama	TKO	8 (12)	Dec 3, 2023	Community Hall, Whittlesea, South Africa	Won vacant African mini-flyweight title
8	Win	5–2–1	Bangile Nyangani	UD	12	Jul 2, 2023	International Convention Centre, East London, South Africa	Won South African mini-flyweight title
7	Win	4–2–1	George Kandulo	UD	6	Sep 25, 2022	Portuguese Hall, Johannesburg, South Africa	
6	Loss	3–2–1	Bangile Nyangani	MD	12	Jul 10, 2021	Nutting Hall, East London, South Africa	Lost South African mini-flyweight title
5	Win	3–1–1	Sibusiso Bandla	KO	5 (12), 2:19	Dec 16, 2019	International Convention Centre, East London, South Africa	Won South African mini-flyweight title
4	Loss	2–1–1	Xolisa Magusha	UD	12	Jul 28, 2019	Orient Theatre, East London, Soiuth Africa	For South African mini-flyweight title
3	Draw	2–0–1	Athenkosi Thongwana	PTS	4	Jun 23, 2019	Orient Theatre, East London, South Africa	
2	Win	2–0	Phumlani Maloni	PTS	6	Apr 7, 2019	Nangoza Jebe Hall, Port Elizabeth, South Africa	
1	Win	1–0	Samkelo Mejane	TKO	3 (6)	Jun 30, 2018	Indoor Sports Centre, Mdantsane, South Africa	

== See also ==
- List of male boxers
- List of southpaw stance boxers
- List of world mini-flyweight boxing champions

Sporting positions
Regional boxing titles
Preceded by Sibusiso Bandla	South African mini-flyweight champion December 16, 2019 – July 10, 2021	Succeeded by Bangile Nyangani
Preceded by Bangile Nyangani	South African mini-flyweight champion July 2, 2023 – 2025; Vacated	Vacant Title next held by Thinumzi Gqola
Vacant Title last held by Ayanda Ndulani	African mini-flyweight champion December 3, 2023 – May 16, 2026; Won world title	Vacant
Vacant Title last held by Janiel Rivera	WBC Silver mini-flyweight champion December 6, 2024 – May 16, 2026; Won world title	Vacant
World boxing titles
Preceded by Melvin Jerusalem	WBC mini-flyweight champion May 16, 2026 – present	Incumbent
