= Daniel Valladares =

Mexican boxer

Personal information
- Nickname: Cejitas
- Born: Angel Daniel Valladares Pérez; 1995 (age 30–31) Monterrey, Nuevo León, Mexico
- Height: 5 ft 3 in (160 cm)
- Weight: Mini flyweight Light flyweight

Boxing career
- Reach: 64 in (163 cm)
- Stance: Orthodox

Boxing record
- Total fights: 34
- Wins: 28
- Win by KO: 16
- Losses: 4
- Draws: 1
- No contests: 1

Angel Daniel Valladares Pérez is a Mexican professional boxer, who has held the IBF mini flyweight from July 2022 to October 2023.

== Professional boxing career ==
=== Early career ===
==== Career beginnings ====
Valladares made his professional debut against Carlos Bernal on 14 February 2014. He won the fight by unanimous decision. He amassed a 12–1 record during the next three years, before being booked to face Juan Guadalupe Munoz Vazquez for the vacant WBC Youth Silver light flyweight title on 4 August 2017. He made his first title defense against Erick Zamora, who later missed weight and was ineligible for the belt, on 17 March 2018. He retained his title by a fourth-round technical knockout. He made his second title defense against Adrian Curiel Dominguez on 2 June 2018. He retained the title by unanimous decision, with scores of 95–94, 98–91 and 95–94.

Valladares faced the unbeaten Gilbert Gonzalez on 9 February 2019, in his first fight of the year. He won the fight by unanimous decision, with scores of 98–90, 98–92 and 99–93. Valladares next face the former WBO minimumweight champion Merlito Sabillo in an eight-round bout on 13 April 2019. He won the fight by a seventh-round technical knockout. The bout was stopped on the advice of the ringside doctor, due to a cut above the left eye of Sabillo. Valladares faced another undefeated opponent, Christian Araneta, on 7 September 2019 in an IBF mini flyweight title eliminator. He won the fight by a fourth-round stoppage, as Araneta retired from the bout at the end of the round.

==== Valladares vs. Taduran ====
Valladares challenged the reigning IBF mini flyweight champion Pedro Taduran on 1 February 2020, at the Jardin Cerveza Expo in Guadalupe, Mexico. The title bout was scheduled as the main event of a Promociones Zanfer promoted card. Taduran retained the title by a fourth-round technical decision, with two judges scoring the fight 38–38, while the third judge scored the fight 39–37 for Valladares. The fight was stopped due to a cut above Valladares' right eye, which was caused by an accidental clash of heads.

==== Second title run ====
After failing to capture the title, Valladares was booked to face Hugo Hernandez Aguilar on 22 August 2020. He suffered his second professional loss, as Aguilar won the bout by unanimous decision. Valladares suffered another loss, a majority decision to Mario Gutierrez Gomez on 19 December 2020, before he rebounded with a fourth-round stoppage victory against Abraham Manriquez Gonzalez on 5 March 2021. Valladares was then scheduled to face Julian Yedras on 14 May 2021. He won the fight by a third-round technical knockout. Valladares faced Jose Javier Torres on 4 September 2021, at the Parque La Ruina in Hermosillo, Mexico, in the main event of an TV Azteca broadcast card. He won the fight by unanimous decision, with scores of 95–94, 97–94 and 96–93.

=== IBF mini flyweight champion ===
==== Valladares vs. Cuarto ====
Valladares was expected to challenge the reigning IBF mini flyweight champion Rene Mark Cuarto on 27 May 2022 in Monterrey, Mexico, in what was to be Cuatro's second title defense. The bout was later cancelled however, due to undisclosed reasons. The fight was later rescheduled for 1 July 2022, and took place at the same location and venue. Valladares won the fight by split decision. Two judges scored the fight 116–111 and 115–112 in his favor, while the third judge scored the bout 114–113 for Cuatro. Cuatro was deducted a point in the tenth round, for loose glove tape.

==== Valladares vs. Shigeoka ====
Soon after winning the IBF title, Valladares and his team offered to face the WBA (Regular) mini flyweight champion Erick Rosa in a title unification bout. Rosa accepted and called off his first title defense against Carlos Ortega only hours before it was supposed to take place. These plans later fell through for undisclosed reasons and Valladares was instead booked to make his first IBF title defense against the undefeated Ginjiro Shigeoka. The fight took place on the same card as Masataka Taniguchi and Melvin Jerusalem's light flyweight championship bout on 6 January 2022, at the Osaka Prefectural Gymnasium in Osaka, Japan. The fight was stopped in the third round, after an accidental clash of heads left Valladares unable to continue fighting, and was ruled a no-contest. All three judges had the bout scored 19–19 at the time of the stoppage.

==== Valladares vs. Shigeoka II ====
Valladares was expected to make his second title defense against Shigeoka on August 11, 2023, at the EDION Arena Osaka in Osaka, Japan. Although the championship bout was an immediate rematch for Valladares, Shigeoka had captured the interim IBF mini-flyweight title in the meantime, with a ninth-round stoppage of Rene Mark Cuarto four months prior. The contest was later postponed for October 7, as Shigeoka suffered a leg injury in training. Shigeoka won the fight by a fifth-round technical knockout.

== Professional boxing record ==
38 fights	31 wins	4 losses
By knockout	19	1
By decision	12	3
Draws	1	
No contests	2	

No.	Result	Record	Opponent	Type	Round, time	Date	Location	Notes
38	Win	31–4–1 (2)	Isaias Ortiz	KO	6 (8), 0:53	14 Aug 2025	Monterrey, Nuevo León, Mexico	
37	Win	30–4–1 (2)	Rogelio Romero	TKO	7 (8), 0:05	10 Apr 2025	Monterrey, Nuevo León, Mexico	
36	NC	29–4–1 (2)	German Valenzuela	NC	4 (8)	7 Dec 2024	Guadalupe, Nuevo León, Mexico	NC after accidental headbutt
35	Win	29–4–1 (1)	Jose Javier Torres	TKO	7 (10), 2:15	15 Jun 2024	Arena José Sulaimán, Moneterrey, Mexico	
34	Win	28–4–1 (1)	Juan Toscano	KO	6 (8), 2:20	7 Mar 2024	Monterrey, Nuevo León, Mexico	
33	Loss	27–4–1 (1)	Ginjiro Shigeoka	TKO	5 (12), 2:15	7 Oct 2023	Ota City General Gymnasium, Ōta, Tokyo, Japan	Lost IBF mini-flyweight title
32	NC	27–3–1 (1)	Ginjiro Shigeoka	NC	3 (12) 2:48	6 Jan 2023	Osaka Prefectural Gymnasium, Osaka, Japan	Retained IBF mini-flyweight title; NC after accidental clash of heads
31	Win	27–3–1	Rene Mark Cuarto	SD	12	1 Jul 2022	Centro Deportivo Revolución, Monterrey, Mexico	Won IBF mini-flyweight title
30	Win	26–3–1	Gabriel Loranca Perez	UD	8	14 Jan 2022	Auditorio Jacales, Monterrey Mexico	
29	Win	25–3–1	Jose Javier Torres	UD	10	28 Aug 2021	Parque La Ruina, Hermosillo, Mexico	
28	Win	24–3–1	Julian Yedras	TKO	3 (10), 2:37	14 May 2021	Gimnasio Mario J. Montemayor, San Nicolas de los Garza, Mexico	
27	Win	23–3–1	Abraham Manriquez Gonzalez	RTD	4 (8), 3:00	5 Mar 2021	Salon de Fiestas Figlos Stase, Culiacan, Mexico	
26	Loss	22–3–1	Mario Gutierrez Gomez	MD	10	19 Dec 2020	Cintermex, Monterrey, Mexico	
25	Loss	22–2–1	Hugo Hernandez Aguilar	UD	10	22 Aug 2020	Gimnasio TV Azteca, Mexico City, Mexico	
24	Draw	22–1–1	Pedro Taduran	TD	4 (12)	1 Feb 2020	Jardin Cerveza Expo, Guadalupe, Mexico	For IBF mini flyweight title
23	Win	22–1	Gabriel Ramirez	MD	10	29 Nov 2019	Arena José Sulaimán, Monterrey, Mexico	
22	Win	21–1	Christian Araneta	RTD	4 (12), 3:00	7 Sep 2019	Arena José Sulaimán, Monterrey, Mexico	
21	Win	20–1	Merlito Sabillo	TKO	7 (8), 2:08	13 Apr 2019	Arena Monterrey, Monterrey, Mexico	
20	Win	19–1	Gilbert Gonzalez	UD	10	9 Feb 2019	Domo Sindicato de Trabajadores IMSS, Tlalpan, Mexico	
19	Win	18–1	Alejandro Villasenor Hernandez	TKO	7 (10), 2:07	22 Sep 2018	Arena José Sulaimán, Monterrey, Mexico	
18	Win	17–1	Adrian Curiel	UD	10	2 Jun 2018	Arena José Sulaimán, Monterrey, Mexico	Retained WBC Youth Silver light flyweight title
17	Win	16–1	Erick Zamora	TKO	4 (10), 2:26	17 Mar 2018	Arena José Sulaimán, Monterrey, Mexico	Retained WBC Youth Silver light flyweight title
16	Win	15–1	Luis Enrique Delgado	KO	3 (8), 2:10	15 Feb 2018	Arena Hotel Marriot, Monterrey, Mexico	
15	Win	14–1	Rene Panchi Casimiro	TKO	4 (8), 2:17	3 Nov 2017	Arena José Sulaimán, Monterrey, Mexico	
14	Win	13–1	Juan Guadalupe Munoz Vazquez	UD	10	4 Aug 2017	Arena José Sulaimán, Monterrey, Mexico	Won vacant WBC Youth Silver light flyweight title
13	Win	12–1	Jose Guadalupe Martinez	TKO	5 (8), 1:42	23 Feb 2017	Foro Tv Azteca, Monterrey, Mexico	
12	Loss	11–1	Genaro Rios	MD	8	9 Dec 2016	Gimnasio Nuevo León Unido, Monterrey, Mexico	
11	Win	11–0	Genaro Rios	SD	6	29 Sep 2016	Monterrey, Mexico	
10	Win	10–0	Jorge Miguel Hernandez	TKO	1 (6), 1:43	30 Jul 2016	Auditorio Municipal, Tijuana, Mexico	
9	Win	9–0	Jose Emmanuel Zuniga	TKO	4 (4), 1:57	10 Mar 2016	Foro Tv Azteca, Monterrey, Mexico	
8	Win	8–0	Luis Manuel Medina	TKO	3 (6), 2:50	17 Dec 2015	Arena El Jefe, Monterrey, Mexico	
7	Win	7–0	Josue Vega	UD	6	29 Oct 2015	Arena TV Azteca, Monterrey, Mexico	
6	Win	6–0	Jesus Lopez	KO	1 (4), 2:41	27 Mar 2015	Arena José Sulaimán, Monterrey, Mexico	
5	Win	5–0	Juan Martinez	TKO	3 (4), 1:27	13 Feb 2015	Arena El Gran Salon, Monterrey, Mexico	
4	Win	4–0	Ricardo Flores	UD	4	24 Oct 2014	Arena Casino Las Palmas, Monterrey, Mexico	
3	Win	3–0	Carlos Bernal	UD	4	9 Aug 2014	Arena Monterrey, Monterrey, Mexico	
2	Win	2–0	Oziel Diaz	KO	3 (4), 1:12	16 May 2014	Gran Salon, Monterrey, Mexico	
1	Win	1–0	Carlos Bernal	UD	4	14 Feb 2014	Auditorio Ferrocarrilero, Monterrey, Mexico	

== See also ==
- List of Mexican boxing world champions
- List of world mini-flyweight boxing champions

Sporting positions
World boxing titles
Preceded by Rene Mark Cuarto	IBF mini flyweight champion July 1, 2022 – October 7, 2023	Succeeded by Ginjiro Shigeoka
