= Jeffrey Galero =

Filipino boxer

Personal information
- Nickname: Jeffer
- Nationality: Filipino
- Born: 15 November 1991 (age 34) Cagayan de Oro City, Misamis Oriental Province, Philippines
- Height: 163 cm (5 ft 4 in)
- Weight: Mini-flyweight

Boxing career
- Stance: Orthodox

Boxing record
- Total fights: 28
- Wins: 17
- Win by KO: 8
- Losses: 11

Jeffrey Boborol Galero (born 15 November 1991) is a Filipino professional boxer who challenged for the WBC mini-flyweight title in 2015.

== Professional career ==
Galero challenged for his first world title on February 5, 2015, against WBC mini-flyweight champion Wanheng Menayothin, but lost by unanimous decision.

== Professional boxing record ==
28 fights	17 wins	11 losses
By knockout	8	7
By decision	9	4

No.	Result	Record	Opponent	Type	Round, time	Date	Location	Notes
28	Loss	17–11	(Philippines) Eldin Guinahon	KO	1 (6), 2:34	20 Dec 2022	Lagonglong, Philippines	
27	Loss	17–10	(Philippines) Mike Kinaadman	KO	3 (8), 0:52	20 Oct 2022	Baungon, Philippines	
26	Loss	17–9	(Philippines) Yeroge Gura	RTD	2 (8), 3:00	7 Aug 2022	Bonifacio R. Bacaltos Sport and Cultural Center, Sibonga, Philippines	
25	Loss	17–8	(Philippines) Samuel Salva	KO	1 (8), 2:46	30 Apr 2022	Dangcagan, Philippines	
24	Loss	17–7	(Japan) Daiki Tomita	KO	3 (8), 1:04	7 Apr 2019	Sangyo Shinko Center, Sakai, Japan	
23	Loss	17–6	(Philippines) Pedro Taduran	KO	2 (12), 2:38	8 Dec 2018	Santa Barbara, Philippines	For PG&AB mini-flyweight title
22	Win	17–5	(Philippines) Nestor Languido	UD	6	11 Aug 2018	Kitabog Covered Court, Titay, Philippines	
21	Loss	16–5	(Japan) Hizuki Saso	SD	8	31 May 2018	Korakuen Hall, Tokyo, Japan	
20	Loss	16–4	(Japan) Naoya Haruguchi	MD	10	11 Mar 2018	Orocity Hall, Kagoshima, Japan	
19	Win	16–3	(Philippines) Ryan Ralozo	TKO	2 (6), 1:31	28 Aug 2017	Baleguian Municipal Gym, Zamboanga del Norte, Philippines	
18	Win	15–3	(Philippines) Ryan Ralozo	UD	6	25 Jun 2017	Public Plaza, Iligan, Philippines	
17	Loss	14–3	(Japan) Tsubasa Koura	TKO	2 (8), 2:44	19 Dec 2016	Korakuen Hall, Tokyo, Japan	
16	Loss	14–2	(Japan) Seita Ogido	UD	8	21 Aug 2016	Prefectural Budokan, Naha, Japan	
15	Win	14–1	(Philippines) Rey Morano	UD	6	27 Dec 2015	Municipal Gym, Sindangan, Philippines	
14	Win	13–1	(Philippines) Michael Bastasa	TKO	2 (6), 1:15	19 Jul 2015	Barangay Santa Filomena Covered Court, Iligan, Philippines	
13	Win	12–1	(Philippines) Rey Morano	TKO	2 (10), 1:18	31 May 2015	Central Market Gym, Iligan, Philippines	
12	Loss	11–1	(Thailand) Wanheng Menayothin	UD	12	5 Feb 2015	City Hall Ground, Chonburi, Thailand	For WBC mini-flyweight title
11	Win	11–0	(Philippines) Donny Mabao	UD	10	31 Aug 2014	Central Market Gym, Iligan, Philippines	
10	Win	10–0	(Philippines) Brobro Languido	TKO	1 (6), 2:39	2 Feb 2014	Iligan, Philippines	
9	Win	9–0	(Philippines) Ryan Ralozo	UD	10	9 Nov 2013	Barangay Maranding, Lala, Philippines	
8	Win	8–0	(Philippines) Jay-R Calunsad	TKO	3 (8), 2:11	30 Jun 2012	Father Saturnino Urios University Gym, Butuan, Philippines	
7	Win	7–0	(Philippines) Oliver Gregorio	UD	6	13 May 2012	Puerto Galera Gym, Puerto Galera, Philippines	
6	Win	6–0	(Philippines) Rissan Muelas	UD	6	12 Feb 2012	Municipal Gym, Kabasalan, Philippines	
5	Win	5–0	(Philippines) Leonardo Talisic	KO	2 (6), 2:39	15 Jan 2012	Lipa, Philippines	
4	Win	4–0	(Philippines) Kenneth Olaso	TKO	3 (4)	3 Sep 2011	Brusmick Compound Gym, Santa Rosa, Philippines	
3	Win	3–0	(Philippines) Emmanuel Sapo	MD	4	24 Apr 2011	Sports Complex, Amadeo, Philippines	
2	Win	2–0	(Philippines) Charlou Paler	UD	4	25 Sep 2010	(Philippines) Hotel EuroAsia, Angeles City	
1	Win	1–0	(Philippines) Maiquel Manguiran	TKO	2 (4), 3:00	17 Jul 2010	Hotel EuroAsia, Angeles City, Philippines	
