= Huidji See =

Dutch pool player, born 1981

Personal information
- Nickname: "Hooch"
- Born: 30 May 1981 (age 45) Arnhem

Pool career
- Country: Netherlands
- Turned pro: 2005
- Pool games: 10-ball, 9-ball, Straight pool

Tournament wins
- World Champion: 10-ball (2011)

Huidji See (born 30 May 1981) is a Dutch professional pool and billiards player. He was the 2011 WPA World 10-Ball Pool Champion.

== Career ==
=== Early life ===
See was born in 1981 in the Netherlands, the son of Chinese parents, and grew up there. Instead of finishing his education, he opted for a career as a professional billiard player. In competitions he competes for the Rotterdam Billiards Club Thurston. His nickname in the pool billiard scene is Hooch.

=== Pool career ===
In 2007 See won silver in the WPA World Straight Pool Championship, losing the final 171–200 against the German Oliver Ortmann. On reaching the final, he had successively defeated players Stevie Moore, Antonio Fazanes, Matt Krah, Bob Maidhof, Niels Feijen, Warren Kiamco and Martin Kempter.

In the Straight pool world championship 2008 in New Brunswick See lost in the quarterfinals to Francisco Bustamante. At the European Pool Championship 2011 he was defeated in 10-ball in the quarterfinals the Russian Konstantin Stepanov, however, won the bronze medal in 9-ball. In March 2010 in the European Pool Championship in the See won a bronze medal in straight pool.

In May 2011, See in Manila won the 2011 WPA World Ten-ball Championship with an 11–8 victory in the final against the Chinese title favorite Jian-Bo Fu. In the group stage he had previously successively defeated the players Jalal Yousef (9–3), Ricky Yang (9–7), Ko Pin-yi (9–6), Tony Drago (9–4) and Yukio Akakariyama (9–6).

See did not opt to retain his World 10-ball championship in 2015.

== Titles ==
- 2011 WPA World Ten-ball Championship
- 2007 CSI U.S. Open 10-Ball Championship
