= Jundel Mazon =

Filipino pool player

Jundel Mazon, aka "Janno", is a Filipino professional pool player from Cavite, Philippines. He was the 2010 Guinness World Series of Pool Ten-ball Champion.

== Career ==
Mazon captured his first international title at the 2010 Guinness World Series of Pool Championship held at Mall Taman Anggrek, Center Atrium, in Jakarta Indonesia.

At 2015, Mazon went undefeated through 64 players field to win the Action Pool Tour Nine-ball. Mazon became the second player to win the Virginia State Eight-ball Championships, which drew 36 entrants in Diamond Billiards in Midlothian, VA.

In 2017, Mazon reached the finals of the 50th All Japan Championship Ten-Ball but was defeated by his fellow countryman Johann Chua, 11–2.

In 2018, Mazon finished runner-up after being defeated by fellow Filipino cue artist Carlo Biado, 13–11 in the Jogja Open 10-Ball International Billiards Tournament in Jakarta, Indonesia.

== Titles and achievements ==
- 2026 Kapolda Cup International Nine-ball Open
- 2026 International Battle Jawara Nine-ball Open
- 2025 Majestix International Open
- 2022 MassKara Billiard Ten-ball Open
- 2015 Action Pool Tour Nine-ball
- 2015 Virginia State Eight-ball Championship
- 2011 Tokai Grand Prix
- 2010 World Series of Pool Championship
