= Arvin Jhon Paciones =

Filipino boxer (born 2005)

AJ Paciones
- Paciones in 2025

Personal information
- Nickname: The Sniper
- Nationality: Filipino
- Born: Arvin Jhon Paciones; 23 January 2005 (age 21) Cebu, Philippines
- Height: 5 ft 7 in (1.70 m)
- Weight: Flyweight

Boxing career
- Stance: Southpaw

Boxing record
- Total fights: 14
- Wins: 14
- Win by KO: 7

Arvin Jhon Paciones (born January 23, 2005) is a Filipino professional boxer who is the current World Boxing Organization Oriental Flyweight Champion since 2025. Known as "The Sniper" Paciones fights as a long‑range precision puncher, using timing and accuracy more than brawling power.

== Early life ==
Paciones was born in Barangay Luz, Cebu City, Philippines. He is the son of former professional boxer Dodong Paciones, who also serves as his father and trainer. Paciones was raised around the sport of boxing and began training under his father at a young age. Growing up in a boxing family, he spent much of his childhood in the gym, developing the fundamentals that would later define his professional style as a tall, long southpaw. As a teenager, Paciones relocated with his father to Vietnam, where he continued his development as a boxer. He is based in Ho Chi Minh City, where he lives and trains at the Saigon Sports Club / SSC Boxing Gym. Under his father's guidance, he turned professional in Vietnam in 2022.He spent the early part of his professional career fighting primarily in Vietnam and Thailand, with only occasional bouts in the Philippines. This international start allowed him to gain experience against foreign opposition at a young age and accelerated his rise in the regional rankings.

== Professional Career ==
Paciones began his career with a series of knockout victories, earning five stoppages including Vichith Oat and Jonathan Refugio in his first eight professional bouts. His early success led to rapid regional recognition and opportunities for championship contention.

==== Paciones vs. Cuarto ====
Kumbati 17 fight card of the Omega Sports Promotions, Paciones fought former world champion Rene Mark Cuarto at IPI Compound, Mandaue City, Cebu on June 29, 2024. Paciones dropped Cuarto in Round 2 and became the most pivotal moment of the bout. Despite the knockdown, Cuarto fought back with pressure and volume, making the middle rounds tight and tactical which relied on inside exchanges and body work. In the end judges ultimately rewarded Paciones cleaner work and momentum. securing a close Split decision win (96–93, 94–95, and 96–93), over the former world champion.

==== Paciones vs. Yotboon ====
Arvin Jhon Paciones and Sanchai Yotboon was officially announced as a WBO Oriental flyweight title bout scheduled for May 31, 2025 in Bangkok, as a part of nine-fight card promoted by FCC Promotions and the Highland Boxing Team. Paciones defeated Sanchai Yotboon, winning by second‑round TKO claiming the WBO Oriental Flyweight.

==== Paciones vs Oclarit ====
===== Thrilla in Manila II Countdown =====
In an 8 round non-title bout Paciones showcased his skills by delivering a spectacular knockout of Jeraldine Oclarit. The knockout occurred at the 2:25 mark of the second round, ending the fight with a clean and convincing finish. In an event deadlined by a World title match between Pedro Taduran vs. Christian Balunan.

== Professional boxing record ==
14 fights	14 wins	0 losses
By knockout	7	0
By decision	7	0

No.	Result	Record	Opponent	Type	Round, time	Date	Location	Notes
14	Win	14–0	Jukiya Iimura	SD	8	2026-11-21	Korakuen Hall, tokyo, Japan	
13	Win	13–0	Richard Laspona	UD	10	2026-05-24	The Flash Grand Ballroom of the Elorde Sports Complex, Parañaque, Philippines	Won WBO Oriental Flyweight title
12	Win	12–0	Jeraldine Oclarit	KO	2 (8), 2:25	2025-10-26	San Andres Sports Complex, Malate, Manila, Philippines	
11	Win	11–0	Sanchai Yotboon	TKO	2 (10), 1:01	2025-05-31	Bangkapi, Bangkok, World Siam Stadium, Thailand	Won WBO Oriental Flyweight title
10	Win	10–1	Xiang Li	UD	12	2024-12-26	Spaceplus Bangkok RCA, Bangkok, Thailand	
9	Win	9–0	Rene Mark Cuarto	SD	10	2024-06-29	Liloan Sports Complex, Liloan, Cebu, Philippines	
8	Win	8–0	Wanchai Nianghansa	KO	1 (12), 2:30	December 16, 2017	Spaceplus Bangkok RCA, Bangkok, Thailand	
7	Win	7–0	Kitidech Hirunsuk	UD	12	2023-12-28	Spaceplus Bangkok RCA, Bangkok, Thailand	
6	Win	6–0	Jin Ping Yang	UD	10	2023-10-24	Sasakul Gym, Lam Luk Ka, Thailand	
5	Win	5–0	Jonathan Refugio	RTD	6 (12), 3:00	2023-08-20	Saigon Sports Club, Ho Chi Minh City, Vietnam	
4	Win	4–0	Sarawut Jiamthong	UD	2 (10), 2:10	2023-03-25	Saigon Sports Club, Ho Chi Minh City, Vietnam	
3	Win	3–0	Vichith Oat	TKO	3 (8), 2:28	December 2, 2016	Space plus Bangkok RCA, Bangkok, Thailand	
2	Win	2–0	Sulis Barrera	UD	8	September 30, 2016	Saigon Sports Club, Ho Chi Minh City, Vietnam	
1	Win	1–0	Adisak Ketpiam	TKO	4 (6), 1:34	2022-03-20	Saigon Sports Club, Ho Chi Minh City, Vietnam	

== Titles in boxing ==
=== Regional/International titles ===
- WBO Oriental Flyweight Champion (112 lbs)
