= Jonas Magpantay =

Filipino pool player (born 1994)

Personal information
- Nickname: The Silent Killer
- Born: 1993 or 1994 (age 31–32)

Pool career
- Country: Philippines

Tournament wins
- Major: 2025 Qatar World Cup Ten-ball
- Other titles: 2023 Manny Pacquiao International Ten-ball Open

Jonas Ruga Magpantay (born 1993 or 1994) is a Filipino professional pool player from Bansud, Oriental Mindoro, Philippines. Nicknamed "The Silent Killer," he won the 2025 Qatar World Cup Ten-ball, claiming his first major international title.

== Career ==
Jonas Magpantay is a professional pool player hailing from Bansud, Oriental Mindoro and a resident of Quezon City.

He has been playing pool as early as 2009 when he won the Pagcor-Kabayan Bilyar Aralan 9-Ball Challenge. He also won the 2011 Philippine Junior Billiards Championship.

Magpantay has also participated in the WPA World 10-ball Championship in the 2011, 2015 and 2025 editions.

Magpantay was a given a slot to participate in the main tournament of the Qatar World Cup Ten-ball in November 2025, after four previous attempts to qualify due to a withdrawal of a player.

A relative unknown in Doha, Magpantay went on to win the World Cup title. He started in Stage 1 while his better known countrymen including AJ Manas, Johann Chua and Carlo Biado received byes to Stage 2. In the round of 32, Magpantay defeated Biado. In the final, Magpantay won 13–9 over Szymon Kural of Poland and bagged the $100,000 prize money.

In June 2026, Magpantay won his first WNT title by defeating Chang Sheng Yi of Chinese Taipei in the final of the Universal 9-Ball Open, held in Jakarta, Indonesia.

== Titles ==
- 2018 Manny Pacquiao Ten-ball Open Doubles - with (Anton Raga)
- 2023 Manny Pacquiao International Ten-ball Open
- 2025 Qatar World Cup Ten-ball Championship
- 2026 Universal Nine-ball Open (Jakarta, Indonesia)
- 2026 Mabuhay Open Ten-ball
