= Rene Mark Cuarto =

Filipino boxer (born 1996)

Personal information
- Nickname: Mighty Mouse
- Nationality: Filipino
- Born: Rene Mark Revillas Cuarto; 4 August 1996 (age 30) Jose Dalman, Zamboanga del Norte, Philippines
- Height: 5 ft 2 in (157 cm)
- Weight: Mini-flyweight; Light-flyweight

Boxing career
- Stance: Orthodox

Boxing record
- Total fights: 35
- Wins: 25
- Win by KO: 14
- Losses: 8
- Draws: 2

Rene Mark Revillas Cuarto (born August 4, 1996) is a Filipino professional boxer who has held the IBF mini-flyweight title from 2021 to 2022.

== Professional career ==
=== Early career ===
Cuarto made his professional debut on June 28, 2014, scoring a four-round unanimous decision (UD) victory against Rodante Suacasa at the Almendras Gym in Davao City, Philippines. After compiling a record of 15–1–1 (9 KOs), he defeated Clyde Azarcon via twelve-round UD at the Gaisano Mall of Davao, Philippines, to capture the vacant WBO Oriental mini-flyweight title.

=== IBF mini flyweight champion ===
==== Cuarto vs Taduran I & 2 ====
Following four more fights–two wins, one loss and a draw–he challenged IBF mini-flyweight champion Pedro Taduran on February 27, 2021, at the Bula Gym in General Santos, Philippines. The bout was initially expected to take place in January, but had to be postponed due to the ongoing COVID-19 pandemic. In a fight which saw Cuarto box at range while the defending champion took a more aggressive role, Cuarto defeated Taduran over twelve rounds via UD, capturing his first world title with all three judges scoring the bout 115–113.

Cuatro faced Taduran in an immediate rematch in his first IBF mini flyweight title defense. The bout was initially scheduled to take place at the City Gymnasium in Digos, Philippines on January 29, 2022, but was eventually postponed for February 6. Cuatro retained the title by a seventh-round technical decision. The bout was stopped due to a cut on Taduran's forehead, which was caused by an accidental clash of heads in the sixth round, after which Cuatro was awarded the majority decision. Two of the judges scored the fight 65–64 and 66–64 in his favor, while the third judge scored it as an even 65–65 draw. Cuatro knocked Tadruan down in both the second and sixth round and was deducted a point in the third round for an intentional headbutt.

==== Cuatro vs. Valladares ====
Cuatro was expected to make his second IBF mini flyweight title defense against the one-time IBF title challenger Daniel Valladares on May 27, 2022, in Monterrey, Mexico. It was supposed to be his second bout outside of the Philippines and first since September 29, 2017. The bout was later cancelled however, due to undisclosed reasons. The fight was later rescheduled for July 1, 2022, and took place at the same location and venue. He lost the fight by split decision. Two judges scored the fight 116–111 and 115–112 in his favor, while the third judge scored the bout 114–113 for Cuatro. Cuatro was deducted a point in the tenth round, for loose glove tape.

=== Post title reign ===
Cuatro faced countryman Dexter Alimento on December 23, 2022, at the Baliok Gym in Davao City, Philippines. He won the fight by a second-round knockout. Alimento was unable to rise from the canvas in time to beat the ten count, after he was forced to take a knee with a liver shot. After he successfully bounced back from his third professional loss, Cuatro was ordered by the IBF to face Ginjiro Shigeoka for the interim mini-flyweight championship, as the reigning champion Daniel Valladares was sidelined with an injury. The fight took on April 16, 2023, at the Yoyogi National Gymnasium in Tokyo, Japan. Cuatro lost the fight by a ninth-round knockout.

== Professional boxing record ==
35 fights	25 wins	8 losses
By knockout	14	2
By decision	11	6
Draws	2	

No.	Result	Record	Opponent	Type	Round, time	Date	Location	Notes
35	Win	25–8–2	Arvin John Sampaga	MD	8	Sep 26, 2026	The Flash Grand Ballroom of the Elorde Sports Complex, Parañaque, Philippines	Won vacant PBF Silver light-flyweight title
34	Win	24–8–2	Clyde Azarcon	KO	2 (6), 2:05	Aug 12, 2025	Magpet, Cotabato, Philippines	
33	Loss	23–8–2	Arvin Magramo	UD	12	Mar 20, 2025	Okada Manila Hotel and Casino, Parañaque, Philippines	For vacant WBC International light-flyweight title
32	Win	23–7–2	Charlie Malupangue	KO	1 (6), 2:21	Feb 9, 2025	Kidapawan, Cotabato, Philippines	
31	Loss	22–7–2	ArAr Andales	UD	10	Dec 1, 2024	Ramon Magsaysay Covered Court, Quezon City, Philippines	
30	Loss	22–6–2	Arvin Jhon Paciones	SD	10	Jun 29, 2024	Liloan Sports Complex, Liloan, Philippines	
29	Win	22–5–2	Reymark Taday	UD	8	Apr 21, 2024	Manolo Fortich Municipal Gymnasium, Manolo Fortich, Philippines	
28	Loss	21–5–2	Shokichi Iwata	TKO	6 (8), 2:21	Jan 20, 2024	Korakuen Hall, Tokyo, Japan	
27	Loss	21–4–2	Ginjiro Shigeoka	KO	9 (12), 2:55	Apr 16, 2023	Yoyogi National Gymnasium, Tokyo, Japan	For inaugural interim IBF mini-flyweight title
26	Win	21–3–2	Dexter Alimento	KO	2 (10), 1:06	Dec 23, 2022	Baliok Gym, Davao City, Philippines	
25	Loss	20–3–2	Daniel Valladares	SD	12	Jul 1, 2022	Centro Deportivo Revolución, Monterrey, Mexico	Lost IBF mini-flyweight title
24	Win	20–2–2	Pedro Taduran	TD	7 (12)	Feb 6, 2022	City Gymnasium, Digos, Philippines	Retained IBF mini-flyweight title; Majority TD: Taduran cut from accidental head clash
23	Win	19–2–2	Pedro Taduran	UD	12	Feb 27, 2021	Bula Gym, General Santos, Philippines	Won IBF mini-flyweight title
22	Win	18–2–2	Jayson Francisco	TKO	5 (8), 1:33	Dec 15, 2019	Robinsons Place, General Santos, Philippines	
21	Draw	17–2–2	Jayson Vayson	PTS	6	Sep 7, 2019	Barangay Fort Bonifac, Taguig, Philippines	
20	Win	17–2–1	Mike Kinaadman	TKO	3 (10), 1:35	Jun 28, 2019	Municipal Gym, Maco, Philippines	
19	Loss	16–2–1	Samuel Salva	UD	12	Mar 23, 2019	Newport Performing Arts Theatre, Pasay, Philippines	
18	Win	16–1–1	Clyde Azarcon	UD	12	Aug 21, 2018	Gaisano Mall of Davao, Davao City, Philippines	Won vacant WBO Oriental mini-flyweight title
17	Win	15–1–1	Rodel Tejares	KO	3 (8), 0:46	Mar 25, 2018	Gaisano Mall of Davao, Davao City, Philippines	
16	Win	14–1–1	Bonjun Loperez	UD	10	Dec 17, 2017	Robinsons Place, General Santos, Philippines	
15	Win	13–1–1	Guangxiong Li	KO	3 (8), 0:55	Sep 29, 2017	Heyuan Royal Garden Hotel, Beijing, China	
14	Win	12–1–1	Rez Padrogane	TKO	5 (6), 2:07	Jul 24, 2017	South Cotabato Gym, Koronadal, Philippines	
13	Win	11–1–1	Lyster Jun Pronco	KO	6 (10), 2:55	May 12, 2017	Waterfront Insular Hotel, Davao City, Philippines	
12	Win	10–1–1	Jerald Paclar	KO	7 (10), 2:44	Mar 18, 2017	Capitol Gym, Digos, Philippines	
11	Draw	9–1–1	Jerald Paclar	TD	3 (10), 0:54	Dec 17, 2016	Robinsons Place, General Santos, Philippines	
10	Win	9–1	Ian Ligutan	UD	10	Jun 4, 2016	Almendras Gym, Davao City, Philippines	
9	Win	8–1	Jessie Suacasa	KO	3 (6), 1:47	Feb 13, 2016	Buluan, Philippines	
8	Win	7–1	Jerome Clavite	UD	8	Dec 19, 2015	City Gym, Panabo, Philippines	
7	Win	6–1	JanJan Santos	MD	6	Sep 6, 2015	Barangay Labangal Gym, General Santos, Philippines	
6	Win	5–1	Saddam Barambangan	TKO	3 (6), 1:32	May 30, 2015	Lagao Gym, General Santos, Philippines	
5	Win	4–1	Nestor Languido	TKO	1 (6), 2:59	Apr 5, 2015	Freedom Park, Panabo, Philippines	
4	Loss	3–1	Jerald Paclar	UD	6	Jan 31, 2015	University of Southeastern Philippines Gymnasium, Davao City, Philippines	
3	Win	3–0	Jason Sanchez	UD	4	Nov 8, 2014	Almendras Gym, Davao City, Philippines	
2	Win	2–0	Gilbert Torres	TKO	1 (4), 2:59	Aug 23, 2014	Almendras Gym, Davao City, Philippines	
1	Win	1–0	Rodante Suacasa	UD	4	Jun 28, 2014	Almendras Gym, Davao City, Philippines	

== See also ==
- List of world mini-flyweight boxing champions

Sporting positions
World boxing titles
Preceded by Pedro Taduran	IBF mini-flyweight champion 27 February 2021 – 1 July 2022	Succeeded by Daniel Valladares
