= Ginjiro Shigeoka =

Japanese boxer (born 1999)

Ginjiro Shigeoka 重岡銀次朗
Personal information
- Born: 18 October 1999 (age 26) Kumamoto, Japan
- Height: 5 ft 0 1/2 in (154 cm)
- Weight: Mini-flyweight

Boxing career
- Reach: 60 1/2 in (154 cm)
- Stance: Southpaw

Boxing record
- Total fights: 14
- Wins: 11
- Win by KO: 9
- Losses: 2
- No contests: 1

Ginjiro Shigeoka (重岡銀次朗, Shigeoka Ginjiro; born 18 October 1999) is a Japanese former professional boxer who held the International Boxing Federation (IBF) mini-flyweight title from 2023 to 2024.

== Early life ==
Ginjiro Shigeoka was born on 18 October 1999 in Kumamoto, Japan, where his family own a painting business. He has three siblings. His introduction to combat sports was through karate while in kindergarten. He began boxing at the Honda Fitness Boxing Gym at the age of 10, giving up karate two years later in order to focus on boxing. He is also the younger brother of fellow boxer and also a world champion Yudai Shigeoka.

== Amateur career ==
As an amateur he won five national titles and compiled a record of 56–1 (17 KOs). His only loss came to his older brother, Yudai Shigeoka. The brothers were scheduled to face each other in the final of a domestic tournament but agreed not to fight, with Ginjiro's corner throwing in the towel as the bell rang to signal the start of the first round.

== Professional career ==
=== Early career ===
Shigeoka was scheduled to make his professional debut against Sanchai Yotboon on September 25, 2018. He won the fight by a third-round technical knockout. Shigeoka was awarded the East Japan Boxing Association September MVP award for this victory.

Shigeoka was scheduled to face Gerttipong Kumsahwat on February 26, 2019. He won the fight by a first-round knockout, needing a little over a minute and a half to finish his opponent. Shigeoka was next scheduled to fight Joel Lino on April 14, 2019. He extended his winning streak to three fights with a unanimous decision victory.

=== Rise up the ranks ===
Shigeoka was scheduled to face Clyde Azarcon for the vacant World Boxing Organisation Asia Pacific Minimumweight title on July 27, 2019. He won the fight by a first-round knockout, stopping Azarcon at the 1:12 minute mark. Shigeoka made the first defense of his WBO Asia Pacific title against Rey Loreto on December 31, 2019, on the undercard of the Kazuto Ioka and Jeyvier Cintrón WBO World Super Fly title match. He won the fight by a fifth-round knockout.

Shigeoka was scheduled to make his second title defense, following a 19-month absence from the sport, against the undefeated Toshiki Kawamitsu on July 14, 2021, in his first career main event. He won the fight by a second-round technical knockout. Shigeoka vacated the WBO Asia Pacific minimumweight title on August 4, 2021.

Shigeoka was booked to face Tatsuro Nakashima on March 27, 2022, at the City Gym in Tomigusuku, Japan, for the vacant Japanese minimumweight title. He won the fight by unanimous decision, with scores of 99–91, 99–91 and 98–92. Shigeoka made his first title defense against the one-time Japanese mini-flyweight title challenger Naoya Haruguchi on July 7, 2022. Shigeoka had a strong start to the bout, and began to take over from the third round onward, stopping Haruguchi with a flurry of punches at the 1:48 minute mark of the fourth round. He vacated the Japanese title on July 29, 2022.

=== IBF interim mini-flyweight champion ===
==== Shigeoka vs. Valladares ====
Shigeoka was booked to challenge the reigning IBF mini flyweight titleholder Daniel Valladares. The fight was booked to take place on the undercard of the Masataka Taniguchi and Melvin Jerusalem light flyweight title bout on January 6, 2022, at the Osaka Prefectural Gymnasium in Osaka, Japan. The fight was stopped at the 2:48 minute mark of the third round, after an accidental headbutt left the champion unable to continue competing. The fight was ruled a no contest. All three judges scored the fight an even 19–19 at the time of the stoppage. Event organizer Kōki Kameda stated during the post-fight press conference that he would try to arrange a rematch for the April of the same year.

==== Shigeoka vs. Cuarto ====
After his no-contest bout with Valladares, Shigeoka and his team sent a request for a rematch to the IBF through the Japan Boxing Commission. As Valladares was unable to make his second title defense due to an injury, the IBF instead ordered Shigeoka to face the former IBF mini-flyweight titleholder Rene Mark Cuarto for the interim championship. The bout was booked to take place on April 16, 2023, at the Yoyogi National Gymnasium in Tokyo, Japan. Shigeoka twice knocked Cuatro down, once each in the seventh and ninth round, and finished the former titlist late in the ninth round. He was briefly credited with a knockdown in the fifth round as well. He was up 78–72, 78–72 and 76–74 on the scorecards at the time of the stoppage.

=== IBF mini-flyweight champion ===
==== Shigeoka vs. Valladares II ====
On June 30, 2023, it was announced that Shigeoka would rematch the IBF mini flyweight champion Daniel Valladares in a title consolidation bout on August 11, 2023. The championship bout was expected to headline the sixth edition of "3150FIGHT", which was scheduled to take place at the EDION Arena Osaka in Osaka, Japan. The fight was later postponed for October 7, as Shigeoka withdrew from the contest on June 27, after suffering a leg injury in training. Shigeoka won the fight by a fifth-round technical knockout.

==== Shigeoka vs. Amparo ====
Shigeoka was expected to make his maiden title defense against the one-time WBA title challenger Ar Ar Andales on March 31, 2024, at the International Conference Hall in Nagoya, Japan. Kameda Promotions were contacted by the Philippines's Games and Amusement Board on March 26, 2024, who informed them that Andales would be withdrawing from the contest due to a weight-cut induced hypoglycemia. Andales was replaced by Jake Amparo, ranked at the time as the sixth-best mini-flyweight by the IBF, who stepped in on a five-day's notice. The championship bout was streamed by Abema TV in Japan, South Korea and Southeast Asia. Shigeoka won the fight by a second-round knockout.

==== Shigeoka vs. Taduran I & II ====
It was announced on 29 May 2024 that Shigeoka would make his third IBF World mini-flyweight title defense against the former titleholder Pedro Taduran, who was at the time the #1 ranked fighter at the weight according to the IBF. The championship bout took place at the Shiga Daihatsu Arena in Otsu, Japan on 28 July 2024 as a part of the "3150FIGHT vol.9" event and was broadcast by Abema TV. Shigeoka lost the fight by a ninth-round technical knockout. It was both the first loss and the first stoppage loss of his professional career. He suffered a fracture of his right orbital bone in the fifth round, which was confirmed by a doctor's examination that same day. Shigeoka successfully underwent surgery for an orbital floor fracture under general anesthesia at Showa University School of Medicine in Tokyo on 8 August 2024.

On 3 January 2025 the IBF ordered Shigeoka, who was at the time the sixth-ranked mini flyweight according to the sanctioning body, to face the fifth-ranked Joey Canoy in a title eliminator. The Filipino fighter was first ordered to face the third-ranked DianXing Zhu, who however declined to negotiate with Canoy. As the negotiations later fell through for undisclosed reasons, Shigeoka was instead scheduled to face the IBF mini flyweight champion Pedro Taduran in an immediate rematch. The fight took place at the Intex Osaka in Osaka, Japan on 24 May 2025, as part of the "3150 x LUSHBOMU vol.5" event, and was broadcast by Abema TV. Shigeoka lost the fight by split decision. Two of the judges scored the fight 118—110 and 115—113 for Taduran, while the third ringside official score the contest 115—113 in favor of the challenger. Shigeoka fell nauseous and lost consciousness following the decision announcement, was carried away on a stretcher and rushed to the hospital. Subsequently on 27 May 2025 the Japanese Boxing Commission (JBC) released a statement that Shigeoka had suffered from an acute subdural hematoma and had already undergone a craniotomy. The JBC has decided that Shigeoka must retire from boxing following his brain surgery. His brother, Yudai, retired from boxing in August 2025 to support him. Shigeoka was moved from the intensive care unit to the general ward in late June and was transferred to a hospital in his hometown on August 6. According to his brother, Shigeoka was at the time suffering from partial paralysis on the left side of his body.

== Professional boxing record ==
14 fights	11 wins	2 losses
By knockout	9	1
By decision	2	1
No contests	1	

No.	Result	Record	Opponent	Type	Round, time	Date	Location	Notes
14	Loss	11–2 (1)	Pedro Taduran	SD	12	May 24, 2025	Intex Osaka, Osaka, Japan	For IBF mini-flyweight title
13	Loss	11–1 (1)	Pedro Taduran	TKO	9 (12), 2:50	Jul 28, 2024	Shiga Daihatsu Arena, Otsu, Japan	Lost IBF mini-flyweight title
12	Win	11–0 (1)	Jake Amparo	KO	2 (12), 1:15	Mar 31, 2024	International Conference Hall, Nagoya, Japan	Retained IBF mini-flyweight title
11	Win	10–0 (1)	Daniel Valladares	TKO	5 (12), 2:15	Oct 7, 2023	Ota City General Gymnasium, Ōta, Tokyo, Japan	Won IBF mini-flyweight title
10	Win	9–0 (1)	Rene Mark Cuarto	KO	9 (12), 2:55	Apr 16, 2023	Yoyogi National Gymnasium, Tokyo, Japan	Won inaugural interim IBF mini-flyweight title
9	NC	8–0 (1)	Daniel Valladares	NC	3 (12) 2:48	Jan 6, 2023	Osaka Prefectural Gymnasium, Osaka, Japan	For IBF mini-flyweight title
8	Win	8–0	Naoya Haruguchi	KO	4 (10), 1:48	Jul 6, 2022	Kumamoto Prefectural Gymnasium, Kumamoto, Japan	Retained Japanese mini-flyweight title
7	Win	7–0	Tatsuro Nakashima	UD	10	Mar 27, 2022	City Gym, Tomigusuku, Japan	Won vacant Japanese mini-flyweight title
6	Win	6–0	Toshiki Kawamitsu	TKO	2 (12), 2:05	Aug 4, 2021	Korakuen Hall, Tokyo, Japan	Retained WBO Asia Pacific mini-flyweight title
5	Win	5–0	Rey Loreto	KO	5 (12), 2:13	Dec 31, 2019	Ota City General Gymnasium, Tokyo, Japan	Retained WBO Asia Pacific mini-flyweight title
4	Win	4–0	Clyde Azarcon	KO	1 (12), 1:12	Jul 27, 2019	Korakuen Hall, Tokyo, Japan	Won vacant WBO Asia Pacific mini-flyweight title
3	Win	3–0	Joel Lino	UD	8	Apr 14, 2019	City Sogo Gym, Kōshi, Japan	
2	Win	2–0	Gerttipong Kumsahwat	TKO	1 (6), 1:35	Feb 26, 2019	Korakuen Hall, Tokyo, Japan	
1	Win	1–0	Sanchai Yotboon	TKO	3 (6), 1:22	Sep 25, 2018	Korakuen Hall, Tokyo, Japan	

== See also ==
- Notable boxing families
- List of southpaw stance boxers
- Boxing in Japan
- List of Japanese boxing world champions
- List of world mini-flyweight boxing champions

Sporting positions
World boxing titles
New title	IBF mini-flyweight champion Interim title 16 April 2023 – 7 October 2023; Won full title	Vacant
Preceded by Daniel Valladares	IBF mini-flyweight champion 7 October 2023 – 28 July 2024	Succeeded by Pedro Taduran
