= Pedro Taduran =

Filipino boxer (born 1996)

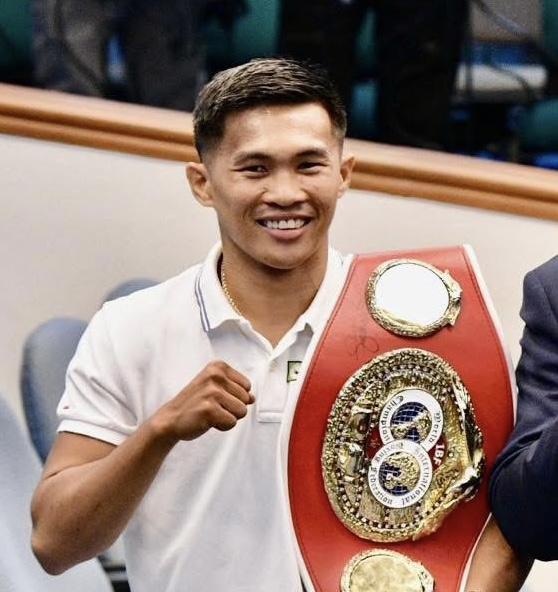
- Taduran in 2025 with his IBF Mini Flyweight World championship belt.

Personal information
- Nickname: Kid Pedro Heneral
- Born: Pedro General Taduran Jr. October 29, 1996 (age 30) Libon, Albay, Philippines
- Height: 5 ft 4 in (163 cm)
- Weight: Mini flyweight

Boxing career
- Reach: 64 1/2 in (164 cm)
- Stance: Southpaw

Boxing record
- Total fights: 26
- Wins: 21
- Win by KO: 14
- Losses: 4
- Draws: 1

Pedro General Taduran Jr. (born October 29, 1996) is a Filipino professional boxer. He is a two-time International Boxing Federation (IBF) mini flyweight, having held the title since July 2024, and previously from 2019 to 2021.

== Professional career ==
=== Early career ===
Taduran made his professional debut against Nathaniel Marasigan on May 16, 2015. He won the fight by a first-round technical knockout. He amassed a 12–1 record over the course of the next three years, with eight stoppage victories, winning the vacant PBF and PG&AB mini-flyweight title along the way.

Taduran was scheduled to challenge the reigning WBC strawweight champion Wanheng Menayothin on August 29, 2018. The fight was contested in Nakhon Sawan, Thailand, which was Taduran's first professional fight outside of Philippines. Wanheng won the fight by unanimous decision, with scores of 118–108, 115–111 and 117–110. The wide decision was further accentuated by the two points that Taduran was deducted for low blows.

Taduran was scheduled to defend his PG&AB mini-flyweight title against Jeffrey Galero on December 8, 2018. He won the fight by a second-round knockout.

=== IBF mini-flyweight champion ===
==== Taduran vs. Salva ====
Taduran was scheduled to fight Samuel Salva for the vacant IBF mini-flyweight title on September 7, 2019, at the Jurado Hall in Taguig, Philippines. It was the first time since 1925 that a world title fight between two Filipinos was contested in Philippines. Taduran had a poor start to the fight as he was knocked down in the first round. He began to take over from the third round onward, when Salva began to have trouble breathing. After the fourth round, Salva remained seated on his stool and signaled to his throat. He had oxygen administered to him in the ring and was soon stretchered out. Accordingly, as Salva was unable to resume fighting, Taduran was awarded the win.

==== Taduran vs. Valladares ====
Taduran was scheduled to make the first defense of his IBF world title against the #1 ranked IBF light flyweight Daniel Valladares on February 1, 2020, at the Jardin Cerveza Expo in Guadalupe, Mexico. The fight was ruled a majority draw, by technical decision, with two judges scoring the bout as 38-38, while the third judge awarded Valladares a 39-37 scorecard. The fight was stopped after the fourth round, as Valladares was unable to continue fighting due to a cut over the right eye. Despite the short nature of the fight, BoxingScene described it as a "Fight of the Year contender".

==== Taduran vs. Cuarto ====
In November 2020, rumors surfaced that Taduran would make his second IBF title defense against Rene Mark Cuarto, which would be his second time in his career that he fought his countryman in a world title bout. Although the fight was initially targeted for December 2020 or January 2021, the ongoing COVID-19 pandemic postponed the fight until February 27, 2021. Although Taduran began to take over in the latter rounds, Cuarto had built a large enough lead to win the fight. Cuarto slipped on the canvas and nearly fell through the ropes in the 12th round, and was able to avoid a knockdown call. Cuarto won the fight by unanimous decision, with all three judges scoring the bout 115–113 in his favor.

==== Taduran vs. Cuarto II ====
An immediate rematch for the IBF mini-flyweight title was booked for January 29, 2022, to take place at the Digos Arena in Davao del Sur, Philippines. The title bout was officially approved by the IBF on January 12. The fight was eventually postponed for February 6. He lost the fight by a seventh-round technical decision. The fight was stopped due to a cut on Taduran's forehead, which resulted from an accidental clash of heads. Two of the judges scored the fight 65–64 and 66–64 for Cuarto, while the third judge scored the fight an even 65–65. Taduran was knocked down in the second and the sixth round, and was deducted two points in the third round for a headbutt.

=== Post-IBF mini-flyweight championship ===
After losing the world title, Taduran had a tune-up fight against journeyman Powell Balaba and emerged victorious after stopping him in the third round.

==== Taduran vs. Amparo ====
On December 28, 2023, Taduran was ranked #4 by the IBF and he clashed against #3 compatriot, Jake Amparo in an IBF mini-flyweight title eliminator, Amparo started dominant in round 1, in round 2 to round 3, Taduran and Amparo exchanged powerful combinations, slugging tirelessly, on round 4 onwards however, despite Amparo remaining consistent, Taduran "outslugged" Amparo, charging forward towards Amparo, giving Amparo a difficult time en route to a victory via lop-sided decision(119–109, 118–110 and 116–112), making Taduran the mandatory challenger against Ginjiro Shigeoka for the title he used to hold.

=== Two-time IBF World Champion ===
==== Taduran vs. Shigeoka I & II ====
Taduran regained the IBF mini-flyweight title when he stopped champion Ginjiro Shigeoka in the ninth-round at the Shiga Daihatsu Arena in Otsu, Japan, on July 28, 2024. An immediate rematch has been held; this moment Taduran overcame a gutsy Ginjiro Shigeoka and won the match via SD to retain the IBF minimumweight title on Saturday at Osaka in Japan. Absorbing heavy blows from Taduran throughout the bout, Shigeoka had to be stretchered off the ring shortly after the 12-round slugfest.

==== Taduran vs. Balunan ====
In an event dedicated to the 50th Year Anniversary of the historic Thrilla in Manila between Muhammad Ali and Joe Frazier, Taduran defended his IBF minimumweight title against Christian Balunan on October 26, 2025, at the San Andres Sports Complex in Manila. He won by unanimous decision.

==== Taduran vs. Perez Alvarez ====
On April 3, 2026, Taduran defended his IBF minimumweight titie against Gustavo Perez Alvarez at Pechanga Resort Casino in Temecula, California, United States. He won by knockout in the seventh round.

== Professional boxing record ==
| 26 fights | 21 wins | 4 losses |
|---|---|---|
| By knockout | 14 | 0 |
| By decision | 7 | 4 |
| Draws | 1 | |

| No. | Result | Record | Opponent | Type | Round, time | Date | Location | Notes |
|---|---|---|---|---|---|---|---|---|
| 26 | Win | 21–4–1 | Brandon Moreno | UD | 12 | Nov 8, 2026 | Albuquerque, Kiva Auditorium, New Mexico, U.S. | Retained IBF mini-flyweight title |
| 25 | Win | 20–4–1 | Gustavo Perez Alvarez | KO | 7 (12), 1:34 | Apr 3, 2026 | Pechanga Resort Casino, Temecula, California, U.S. | Retained IBF mini-flyweight title |
| 24 | Win | 19–4–1 | Christian Balunan | UD | 12 | Oct 26, 2025 | San Andres Sports Complex, Manila, Philippines | Retained IBF mini-flyweight title |
| 23 | Win | 18–4–1 | Ginjiro Shigeoka | SD | 12 | May 24, 2025 | Intex Osaka, Osaka, Japan | Retained IBF mini-flyweight title |
| 22 | Win | 17–4–1 | Ginjiro Shigeoka | TKO | 9 (12), 2:50 | Jul 28, 2024 | Shiga Daihatsu Arena, Ōtsu, Japan | Won IBF mini-flyweight title |
| 21 | Win | 16–4–1 | Jake Amparo | UD | 12 | Dec 28, 2023 | Bohol Wisdom School Gym, Tagbilaran, Philippines | |
| 20 | Win | 15–4–1 | Powell Balaba | TKO | 3 (6), 1:03 | Jan 30, 2023 | Elorde Sports Complex, Parañaque, Philippines | |
| 19 | Loss | 14–4–1 | Rene Mark Cuarto | TD | 7 (12) | Feb 6, 2022 | City Gymnasium, Digos, Philippines | For IBF mini-flyweight title; Majority TD: Taduran cut from accidental head clash |
| 18 | Loss | 14–3–1 | Rene Mark Cuarto | UD | 12 | Feb 27, 2021 | Bula Gym, General Santos, Philippines | Lost IBF mini-flyweight title |
| 17 | Draw | 14–2–1 | Daniel Valladares | TD | 4 (12), 3:00 | Feb 1, 2020 | Jardin Cerveza Expo, Guadalupe, Mexico | Retained IBF mini-flyweight title; Majority TD: Valladares cut from accidental head clash |
| 16 | Win | 14–2 | Samuel Salva | RTD | 4 (12), 3:00 | Sep 7, 2019 | Jurado Hall, Taguig, Philippines | Won vacant IBF mini-flyweight title |
| 15 | Win | 13–2 | Jeffrey Galero | KO | 2 (12), 2:38 | Dec 8, 2018 | Santa Barbara, Pangasinan, Philippines | Retained Filipino (GAB) mini-flyweight title |
| 14 | Loss | 12–2 | Wanheng Menayothin | UD | 12 | Aug 29, 2018 | Nakhon Sawan, Nakhon Sawan Province, Thailand | For WBC mini-flyweight title |
| 13 | Win | 12–1 | Jerry Tomogdan | KO | 5 (12), 2:54 | Jan 27, 2018 | Barangay Aglayan, Malaybalay, Philippines | Won Filipino (GAB) mini-flyweight title |
| 12 | Win | 11–1 | Philip Luis Cuerdo | TKO | 2 (10), 2:00 | May 21, 2017 | Moncada Auditorium, Moncada, Philippines | Won vacant Filipino (PBF) mini-flyweight title |
| 11 | Win | 10–1 | Jerome Clavite | UD | 8 | Feb 26, 2017 | Bunch Medical Center, Victoria, Philippines | |
| 10 | Win | 9–1 | Dexter Dimaculangan | RTD | 5 (8), 3:00 | Nov 26, 2016 | Covered Court, Agoncillo, Philippines | |
| 9 | Win | 8–1 | Noel Guliman | TKO | 3 (6), 0:38 | Sep 3, 2016 | SMX Convention Center, Pasay, Philippines | |
| 8 | Win | 7–1 | Kerter Jhun Pagunsan | UD | 4 | May 25, 2016 | Moncada Auditorium, Moncada, Philippines | |
| 7 | Loss | 6–1 | Joel Lino | SD | 6 | Apr 1, 2016 | Municipal Gymnasium, M'lang, Philippines | |
| 6 | Win | 6–0 | Jun Jun Rimasog | TKO | 4 (6), 0:56 | Feb 12, 2016 | Mandaluyong Sports Center, Mandaluyong, Philippines | |
| 5 | Win | 5–0 | Robert Onggocan | UD | 6 | Dec 2, 2015 | Highway Hills School Gymnasium, Mandaluyong, Philippines | |
| 4 | Win | 4–0 | Rolando Prima Jr | TKO | 2 (4), 2:04 | Sep 25, 2015 | Big 5 Gym, Tarlac City, Philippines | |
| 3 | Win | 3–0 | Emmanuel Villanueva | TKO | 1 (4), 1:35 | Aug 8, 2015 | Lagawe Gym, Lagawe, Philippines | |
| 2 | Win | 2–0 | Jun Inao | TKO | 4 (4), 1:11 | Jun 21, 2015 | Big 5 Gym, Concepcion, Philippines | |
| 1 | Win | 1–0 | Nathaniel Marasigan | TKO | 1 (4), 2:56 | May 16, 2015 | Town Plaza, Moncada, Philippines | |

== Personal life ==
Taduran is the eighth of nine siblings. Two of his brothers also took up boxing.

== See also ==
- List of southpaw stance boxers
- List of Filipino boxing world champions
- List of world mini-flyweight boxing champions

Sporting positions
Regional boxing titles
| Vacant Title last held by Ronie Tanallon | Filipino (PBF) mini-flyweight champion May 21, 2017 – 2018; Vacated | Vacant Title next held by Clyde Azarcon |
| Preceded by Jerry Tomogdan | Filipino (GAB) mini-flyweight champion January 27, 2018 – September 7, 2019; Won world title | Vacant Title next held by Joel Lino |
World boxing titles
| Vacant Title last held by Deejay Kriel | IBF mini-flyweight champion September 7, 2019 – February 27, 2021 | Succeeded by Rene Mark Cuarto |
| Preceded by Ginjiro Shigeoka | IBF mini-flyweight champion July 28, 2024 – present | Incumbent |
