= List of IBF world champions =

This is a list of IBF world champions, showing every world champion recognized by the International Boxing Federation (IBF). The IBF is one of the four major governing bodies in professional boxing, and has awarded world champions in 17 different weight classes since 1983.

Boxers who won the title but were stripped due to the title bout being overturned to a no contest are not listed.

Current champion
Most consecutive title defenses

== Heavyweight ==
No.	Name	Reign	Defenses
1	Larry Holmes (awarded inaugural title)	11 Dec 1983 – 21 Sep 1985	3
2	Michael Spinks	21 Sep 1985 – 26 Feb 1987	2
Spinks was stripped of the title for refusing to fight mandatory challenger Tony Tucker.
3	Tony Tucker (def. Buster Douglas)	30 May – 1 Aug 1987	0
4	Mike Tyson	1 Aug 1987 – 11 Feb 1990	6
5	Buster Douglas	11 Feb – 25 Oct 1990	0
6	Evander Holyfield	25 Oct 1990 – 13 Nov 1992	3
7	Riddick Bowe	13 Nov 1992 – 6 Nov 1993	1
8	Evander Holyfield (2)	6 Nov 1993 – 22 Apr 1994	0
9	Michael Moorer	22 Apr – 5 Nov 1994	0
10	George Foreman	5 Nov 1994 – 29 Jun 1995	1
Foreman vacated the title after refusing to participate in an IBF-mandated rematch with Axel Schulz.
11	Michael Moorer (2) (def. Axel Schulz)	22 Jun 1996 – 8 Nov 1997	2
12	Evander Holyfield (3)	8 Nov 1997 – 13 Nov 1999	2
13	Lennox Lewis	13 Nov 1999 – 22 Apr 2001	3
14	Hasim Rahman	22 Apr – 17 Nov 2001	0
15	Lennox Lewis (2)	17 Nov 2001 – 5 Sep 2002	1
Lewis vacated the IBF title after refusing to negotiate terms with mandatory challenger Chris Byrd and by being given US$1 million and a Range Rover by promoter Don King to do so, because King wished to promote a fight between Byrd and Evander Holyfield for the vacant title.
16	Chris Byrd (def. Evander Holyfield)	14 Dec 2002 – 22 Apr 2006	4
17	Wladimir Klitschko	22 Apr 2006 – 28 Nov 2015	18
18	Tyson Fury	28 Nov – 8 Dec 2015	0
Fury was stripped of the title for agreeing to a rematch with Wladimir Klitschko instead of fighting mandatory challenger Vyacheslav Glazkov.
19	Charles Martin (def. Vyacheslav Glazkov)	16 Jan – 9 Apr 2016	0
20	Anthony Joshua	9 Apr 2016 – 1 Jun 2019	6
21	Andy Ruiz Jr.	1 Jun – 7 Dec 2019	0
22	Anthony Joshua (2)	7 Dec 2019 – 25 Sep 2021	1
23	Oleksandr Usyk	25 Sep 2021 – 25 Jun 2024	3
Usyk vacated the title after opting to rematch Tyson Fury instead of facing his mandatory challenger Daniel Dubois.
24	Daniel Dubois (interim champion promoted)	26 Jun 2024 – 19 Jul 2025	1
25	Oleksandr Usyk (2)	19 Jul 2025 – 26 Jun 2026	0
Usyk vacated the title.
26	Filip Hrgović (def. Moses Itauma)	29 Aug 2026 – present	0

== Cruiserweight ==
No.	Name	Reign	Defenses
1	Marvin Camel (def. Roddy MacDonald)	13 Dec 1983 – 6 Oct 1984	0
2	Lee Roy Murphy	6 Oct 1984 – 25 Oct 1986	3
3	Rickey Parkey	25 Oct 1986 – 15 May 1987	1
4	Evander Holyfield	15 May 1987 – Dec 1988	3
Holyfield vacated the title to move up to heavyweight full time.
5	Glenn McCrory (def. Patrick Lumumba)	3 June 1989 – 22 Mar 1990	1
6	Jeff Lampkin	22 Mar 1990 – 14 Aug 1991	1
IBF coordinator Bill Brennan revealed that Lampkin vacated the title for unknown reasons.
7	James Warring (def. James Pritchard)	7 Sep 1991 – 30 Jul 1992	2
8	Al Cole	30 Jul 1992 – 1 Aug 1996	5
Cole was still listed as champion on IBF's June 1996 rankings posted on 31 July however, just one day after it was posted, a schedule slated for 31 August was released for the vacant IBF title between Adolpho Washington and Torsten May.
9	Adolpho Washington (def. Torsten May)	31 Aug 1996 – 21 Jun 1997	0
10	Uriah Grant	21 Jun – 8 Nov 1997	0
11	Imamu Mayfield	8 Nov 1997 – 30 Oct 1998	1
12	Arthur Williams	30 Oct 1998 – 5 Jun 1999	0
13	Vassiliy Jirov	5 Jun 1999 – 26 Apr 2003	6
14	James Toney	26 Apr 2003 – 11 Feb 2004	0
Toney opted to stay at heavyweight. The title is vacated on IBF's January 2004 rankings posted on 11 February.
15	Kelvin Davis (def. Ezra Sellers)	1 May 2004 – 9 Feb 2005	0
Davis was stripped of the title after a fight with O'Neil Bell scheduled for 5 February 2005 was cancelled.
16	O'Neil Bell (def. Dale Brown)	20 May 2005 – 6 Apr 2006	2
Bell was stripped of the title after undergoing dental surgery and subsequently withdrawing from a fight with mandatory challenger Steve Cunningham scheduled for 6 May.
17	Krzysztof Włodarczyk (def. Steve Cunningham)	25 Nov 2006 – 26 May 2007	0
18	Steve Cunningham	26 May 2007 – 11 Dec 2008	0
19	Tomasz Adamek	11 Dec 2008 – 18 Oct 2009	2
Adamek vacated the title to move up to heavyweight.
20	Steve Cunningham (2) (def. Troy Ross)	5 Jun 2010 – 1 Oct 2011	1
21	Yoan Pablo Hernández	1 Oct 2011 – 22 Sep 2015	4
Hernández was stripped of the title after withdrawing from a scheduled mandatory defense against Víctor Emilio Ramírez due to injury.
22	Victor Emilio Ramírez (interim champion promoted)	22 Sep 2015 – 21 May 2016	1
23	Denis Lebedev	21 May – 3 Dec 2016	0
24	Murat Gassiev	3 Dec 2016 – 21 Jul 2018	2
25	Oleksandr Usyk	21 Jul 2018 – 15 Jun 2019	1
Usyk vacated the title to move up to heavyweight.
26	Yuniel Dorticos (def. Andrew Tabiti)	15 Jun 2019 – 26 Sep 2020	0
27	Mairis Briedis	26 Sep 2020 – 2 Jul 2022	1
28	Jai Opetaia	2 Jul 2022 – 18 Dec 2023	1
Opetaia vacated the title after the IBF denied his voluntary defense request against Ellis Zorro.
29	Jai Opetaia (2) (def. Mairis Briedis)	18 May 2024 – 23 Mar 2026	4
Opetaia is stripped of the title after participating in an unsanctioned bout on 8 March.

== Light heavyweight ==
No.	Name	Reign	Defenses
1	Michael Spinks (def. Eddie Davis)	25 Feb 1984 – 5 Nov 1985	2
Spinks vacated his titles and moved up to heavyweight.
2	Slobodan Kačar (def. Eddie Mustafa Muhammad)	21 Dec 1985 – 6 Sep 1986	0
3	Bobby Czyz	6 Sep 1986 – 29 Oct 1987	3
4	Charles Williams	29 Oct 1987 – 20 Mar 1993	8
5	Henry Maske	20 Mar 1993 – 23 Nov 1996	10
6	Virgil Hill	23 Nov 1996 – 13 Jun 1997	0
7	Dariusz Michalczewski	13 Jun – 16 Jun 1997	0
Michalczewski vacated the title after refusing to fight mandatory challenger William Guthrie.
8	William Guthrie (def. Darrin Allen)	19 Jul 1997 – 6 Feb 1998	0
9	Reggie Johnson	6 Feb 1998 – 5 Jun 1999	2
10	Roy Jones Jr.	5 Jun 1999 – 19 Nov 2002	7
Jones Jr. vacated the title.
11	Antonio Tarver (def. Montell Griffin)	26 Apr – 31 Oct 2003	0
Tarver vacated the title due to agreeing to a fight with Roy Jones Jr. which included a rematch clause that would have made him unavailable for a mandatory defense had he won.
12	Glen Johnson (def. Clinton Woods)	6 Feb – 4 Nov 2004	1
Johnson vacated the title after agreeing to fight Antonio Tarver instead of participating in a mandatory defense.
13	Clinton Woods (def. Rico Hoye)	4 Mar 2005 – 12 Apr 2008	4
14	Antonio Tarver (2)	12 Apr – 11 Oct 2008	0
15	Chad Dawson	11 Oct 2008 – 27 May 2009	1
Dawson vacated the title after refusing to negotiate terms with mandatory challenger Tavoris Cloud and instead pursued a rematch with Glen Johnson.
16	Tavoris Cloud (def. Clinton Woods)	28 Aug 2009 – 9 Mar 2013	4
17	Bernard Hopkins	9 Mar 2013 – 8 Nov 2014	2
18	Sergey Kovalev	8 Nov 2014 – 19 Nov 2016	4
19	Andre Ward	19 Nov 2016 – 21 Sep 2017	1
Ward retires.
20	Artur Beterbiev (def. Enrico Kölling)	11 Nov 2017 – 22 Feb 2025	9
21	Dmitry Bivol	22 Feb 2025 – present	1

== Super middleweight ==
No.	Name	Reign	Defenses
1	Murray Sutherland (def. Ernie Singletary)	28 Mar – 22 Jul 1984	0
2	Park Chong-pal	22 Jul 1984 – 2 Feb 1988	7
Park was stripped of the title after failing to make a mandatory defense within the IBF's prescribed time limit.
3	Graciano Rocchigiani (def. Vincent Boulware)	11 Mar 1988 – 22 Sep 1989	3
Rocchigiani, citing difficulties making weight, vacated the title and withdrew from a scheduled October fight with Frank Tate to move up to light heavyweight.
4	Lindell Holmes (def. Frank Tate)	27 Jan 1990 – 18 May 1991	3
5	Darrin Van Horn	18 May 1991 – 10 Jan 1992	1
6	Iran Barkley	10 Jan 1992 – 13 Feb 1993	0
7	James Toney	13 Feb 1993 – 18 Nov 1994	3
8	Roy Jones Jr.	18 Nov 1994 – 20 Feb 1997	5
Jones, having previously moved up to light heavyweight in November 1996 when he defeated Mike McCallum for the interim WBC title, vacated the IBF super middleweight title, citing the sanctioning bodies' policies of not liking titles to be held in different weight classes simultaneously.
9	Charles Brewer (def. Gary Ballard)	21 Jun 1997 – 24 Oct 1998	3
10	Sven Ottke	24 Oct 1998 – 27 Mar 2004	21
Ottke retired as the unified WBA/IBF world champion immediately after his defense against Armand Krajnc in Magdeburg, Germany.
11	Jeff Lacy (def. Syd Vanderpool)	2 Oct 2004 – 4 Mar 2006	4
12	Joe Calzaghe	4 Mar – 27 Nov 2006	1
Calzaghe vacated the title after refusing to fight mandatory challenger Robert Stieglitz and instead accepted a fight with Peter Manfredo Jr.
13	Alejandro Berrio (def. Robert Stieglitz)	3 Mar – 19 Oct 2007	0
14	Lucian Bute	19 Oct 2007 – 26 May 2012	9
15	Carl Froch	26 May 2012 – 3 Feb 2015	4
Froch vacated the title due to his inability to defend it following an elbow injury.
16	James DeGale (def. Andre Dirrell)	23 May 2015 – 9 Dec 2017	3
17	Caleb Truax	9 Dec 2017 – 7 Apr 2018	0
18	James DeGale (2)	7 Apr – 4 Jul 2018	0
DeGale vacated the title one day before a scheduled purse bid for a fight with José Uzcátegui was supposed to take place.
19	José Uzcátegui (interim champion promoted)	4 Jul 2018 – 13 Jan 2019	0
20	Caleb Plant	13 Jan 2019 – 6 Nov 2021	3
21	Canelo Álvarez	6 Nov 2021 – 26 Jul 2024	4
Álvarez was stripped of the title for opting to fight Edgar Berlanga instead of his mandatory challenger William Scull.
22	William Scull (def. Vladimir Shishkin)	19 Oct 2024 – 3 May 2025	0
23	Canelo Álvarez (2)	3 May – 13 Sep 2025	0
24	Terence Crawford	13 Sep – 23 Dec 2025	0
Crawford vacated the title seven days after announcing his retirement.
25	Osleys Iglesias (def. Pavel Silyagin)	9 Apr 2026 – present	1

== Middleweight ==
No.	Name	Reign	Defenses
1	Marvin Hagler (def. Wilford Scypion)	27 May 1983 – 6 Apr 1987	5
The IBF refused to sanction Hagler's defense against Sugar Ray Leonard and stripped him of the title after losing the bout.
2	Frank Tate (def. Michael Olajide)	10 Oct 1987 – 28 Jul 1988	1
3	Michael Nunn	28 Jul 1988 – 10 May 1991	5
4	James Toney	10 May 1991 – 15 Feb 1993	6
Toney vacated the title in favor of his IBF super middleweight title.
5	Roy Jones Jr. (def. Bernard Hopkins)	22 May 1993 – 25 Aug 1994	1
Jones vacated the title to challenge James Toney for the IBF super middleweight title.
6	Bernard Hopkins (def. Segundo Mercado)	29 Apr 1995 – 16 Jul 2005	19
7	Jermain Taylor	16 Jul – 11 Oct 2005	0
Taylor vacated the title after refusing to participate in an immediate mandatory defense and instead agreed to a rematch with Bernard Hopkins.
8	Arthur Abraham (def. Kingsley Ikeke)	20 Dec 2005 – 11 Jul 2009	10
Abraham vacated the title to move up to super middleweight and participate in the Super Six World Boxing Classic.
9	Sebastian Sylvester (def. Giovanni Lorenzo)	19 Sep 2009 – 7 May 2011	3
10	Daniel Geale	7 May 2011 – 17 Aug 2013	4
11	Darren Barker	17 Aug – 7 Dec 2013	0
12	Felix Sturm	7 Dec 2013 – 31 May 2014	0
13	Sam Soliman	31 May – 8 Oct 2014	0
14	Jermain Taylor (2)	8 Oct 2014 – 5 Feb 2015	0
Taylor was stripped of the title due to his inability to defend it during his ongoing legal and mental health issues.
15	David Lemieux (def. Hassan N'Dam N'Jikam)	20 Jun – 17 Oct 2015	0
16	Gennady Golovkin	17 Oct 2015 – 6 Jun 2018	4
After Golovkin's fight with Canelo Alvarez on 5 May was cancelled, the IBF granted an exemption to him to face Vanes Martirosyan in a non-IBF sanctioned bout on the same date with the stipulation that he must face mandatory challenger Sergiy Derevyanchenko by 3 August. After Golovkin failed to agree in writing to a fight with Derevyanchenko, he was stripped of the title.
17	Daniel Jacobs (def. Sergiy Derevyanchenko)	27 Oct 2018 – 4 May 2019	0
18	Canelo Álvarez	4 May – 1 Aug 2019	0
Álvarez was stripped of the title after failing to negotiate terms for a bout against mandatory challenger Sergiy Derevyanchenko.
19	Gennady Golovkin (2) (def. Sergiy Derevyanchenko)	5 Oct 2019 – 6 Feb 2023	2
Golovkin vacated the title.
20	Vincenzo Gualtieri (def. Esquiva Falcão)	1 Jul – 14 Oct 2023	0
21	Janibek Alimkhanuly	14 Oct 2023 – 10 Mar 2026	2
Alimkhanuly is stripped of the title after failing in a pre-fight drug test prior to his unification fight against Erislandy Lara.
22	Aaron McKenna (def. Etinosa Oliha)	8 Aug 2026 – present	0

== Junior middleweight ==
No.	Name	Reign	Defenses
1	Mark Medal (def. Earl Hargrove)	11 Mar – 2 Nov 1984	0
2	Carlos Santos	2 Nov 1984 – 4 Jun 1986	1
3	Buster Drayton	4 Jun 1986 – 27 Jun 1987	2
4	Matthew Hilton	27 Jun 1987 – 4 Nov 1988	1
5	Robert Hines	4 Nov 1988 – 5 Feb 1989	0
6	Darrin Van Horn	5 Feb – 15 Jul 1989	0
7	Gianfranco Rosi	15 Jul 1989 – 17 Sep 1994	11
8	Vincent Pettway	17 Sep 1994 – 12 Aug 1995	1
9	Paul Vaden	12 Aug – 16 Dec 1995	0
10	Terry Norris	16 Dec 1995 – 19 Mar 1997	4
Norris was stripped of the title after failing to negotiate terms with mandatory challenger Raúl Márquez and instead agreeing to a fight with Félix Trinidad in June, which was ultimately cancelled.
11	Raúl Márquez (def. Anthony Stephens)	12 Apr – 6 Dec 1997	2
12	Luis Ramón Campas	6 Dec 1997 – 12 Dec 1998	3
13	Fernando Vargas	12 Dec 1998 – 2 Dec 2000	5
14	Félix Trinidad	2 Dec 2000 – 20 May 2001	0
Trinidad vacated the title in favor of his WBA middleweight title.
15	Winky Wright (def. Robert Frazier)	12 Oct 2001 – 19 Apr 2004	5
Wright was stripped of the title after refusing to fight mandatory challenger Kassim Ouma and instead accepted a rematch with Shane Mosley.
16	Verno Phillips (def. Carlos Bojorquez)	5 Jun – 2 Oct 2004	0
17	Kassim Ouma	2 Oct 2004 – 14 Jul 2005	1
18	Roman Karmazin	14 Jul 2005 – 8 Jul 2006	0
19	Cory Spinks	8 Jul 2006 – 27 Mar 2008	1
20	Verno Phillips (2)	27 Mar – 19 Nov 2008	0
Phillips vacated the title to fight Paul Williams.
21	Cory Spinks (2) (def. Deandre Latimore)	24 Apr 2009 – 7 Aug 2010	0
22	Cornelius Bundrage	7 Aug 2010 – 23 Feb 2013	2
23	Ishe Smith	23 Feb – 14 Sep 2013	0
24	Carlos Molina	14 Sep 2013 – 11 Oct 2014	0
25	Cornelius Bundrage (2)	11 Oct 2014 – 12 Sep 2015	0
26	Jermall Charlo	12 Sep 2015 – 16 Feb 2017	3
Charlo vacated the title to move up to middleweight.
27	Jarrett Hurd (def. Tony Harrison)	25 Feb 2017 – 11 May 2019	3
28	Julian Williams	11 May 2019 – 18 Jan 2020	0
29	Jeison Rosario	18 Jan – 26 Sep 2020	0
30	Jermell Charlo	26 Sep 2020 – 21 Nov 2023	2
Charlo vacated the title instead of defending against his mandatory challenger.
31	Bakhram Murtazaliev (def. Jack Culcay)	6 Apr 2024 – 31 Jan 2026	1
32	Josh Kelly	31 Jan 2026 – present	1

== Welterweight ==
No.	Name	Reign	Defenses
1	Donald Curry (def. Marlon Starling)	4 Feb 1984 – 27 Sep 1986	4
2	Lloyd Honeyghan	27 Sep 1986 – 28 Oct 1987	3
The IBF refused to sanction Honeyghan's defense against Jorge Vaca because he was not ranked among its top 12 contenders and stripped him of the title after he lost the bout.
3	Simon Brown (def. Tyrone Trice)	23 Apr 1988 – 7 May 1991	8
Brown vacated the title due to the IBF's decision to sanction bouts in apartheid South Africa and for its handling of his March title unification bout with former WBC champion Maurice Blocker.
4	Maurice Blocker (def. Glenwood Brown)	4 Oct 1991 – 19 Jun 1993	1
5	Félix Trinidad	19 Jun 1993 – 10 Mar 2000	15
Trinidad vacated the title a week after moving up to junior middleweight and winning the WBA title against David Reid.
6	Vernon Forrest (def. Raul Frank)	12 May – 11 Dec 2001	0
Forrest was stripped of the title after announcing he would fight WBC champion Shane Mosley instead of mandatory challenger Michele Piccirillo.
7	Michele Piccirillo (def. Cory Spinks)	13 Apr 2002 – 22 Mar 2003	0
8	Cory Spinks	22 Mar 2003 – 5 Feb 2005	3
9	Zab Judah	5 Feb 2005 – 8 Apr 2006	1
10	Floyd Mayweather Jr.	8 Apr – 20 Jun 2006	0
Mayweather vacated the title to fight a notable opponent instead of fighting his mandatory challenger Mark Suárez. The title was vacated on IBF's June 2006 rankings posted on 20 June.
11	Kermit Cintrón (def. Mark Suárez)	28 Oct 2006 – 12 Apr 2008	2
12	Antonio Margarito	12 Apr – 23 May 2008	0
Margarito vacated the title after refusing to fight mandatory challenger Joshua Clottey and instead agreed to a fight with Miguel Cotto for his WBA title on 26 July 2008.
13	Joshua Clottey (def. Zab Judah)	2 Aug 2008 – 16 Apr 2009	0
Clottey vacated the title after Miguel Cotto, the WBO welterweight champion, failed to sign his contract in time for the IBF to approve their 13 June fight as a unification bout and grant Clottey an exemption from facing mandatory challenger Isaac Hlatshwayo.
14	Isaac Hlatshwayo (def. Delvin Rodríguez)	1 Aug – 11 Dec 2009	0
15	Jan Zaveck	11 Dec 2009 – 3 Sep 2011	3
16	Andre Berto	3 Sep – 8 Nov 2011	0
Berto vacated the title after HBO indicated a lack of interest in him facing mandatory challenger Randall Bailey on their network and instead pursued a rematch against Victor Ortiz.
17	Randall Bailey (def. Mike Jones)	9 Jun – 20 Oct 2012	0
18	Devon Alexander	20 Oct 2012 – 7 Dec 2013	1
19	Shawn Porter	7 Dec 2013 – 16 Aug 2014	1
20	Kell Brook	16 Aug 2014 – 27 May 2017	3
21	Errol Spence Jr.	27 May 2017 – 29 Jul 2023	6
22	Terence Crawford	29 Jul – 9 Nov 2023	0
Crawford was stripped of the title for choosing to rematch Errol Spence Jr. instead of fighting his mandatory challenger Jaron Ennis.
23	Jaron Ennis (interim champion promoted)	9 Nov 2023 – 7 Jul 2025	3
Ennis announced that he was moving up to junior middleweight. IBF vacated the title on 7 July in their latest monthly ratings.
24	Lewis Crocker (def. Paddy Donovan)	13 Sep 2025 – 24 Jun 2026	0
25	Liam Paro	24 Jun 2026 – present	0

== Junior welterweight ==
No.	Name	Reign	Defenses
1	Aaron Pryor (def. Nick Furlano)	22 Jun 1984 – 9 Dec 1985	1
Pryor was stripped of the title due to inactivity.
2	Gary Hinton (def. Reyes Antonio Cruz)	26 Apr – 30 Oct 1986	1
3	Joe Manley	30 Oct 1986 – 4 Mar 1987	0
4	Terry Marsh	4 Mar – 15 Sep 1987	1
Marsh vacated the title upon his retirement due to epilepsy.
5	Buddy McGirt (def. Frankie Warren)	14 Feb – 3 Sep 1988	1
6	Meldrick Taylor	3 Sep 1988 – 17 May 1990	2
7	Julio César Chávez	17 May 1990 – 22 Apr 1991	2
Chávez vacated the title, citing a dispute with IBF president Bob Lee and promoter Bob Arum.
8	Rafael Pineda (def. Roger Mayweather)	7 Dec 1991 – 18 Jul 1992	1
9	Pernell Whitaker	18 Jul 1992 – 6 Mar 1993	0
Whitaker vacated the title when he moved up to welterweight to challenge WBC champion James McGirt.
10	Charles Murray (def. Rodney Moore)	15 May 1993 – 13 Feb 1994	2
11	Jake Rodríguez	13 Feb 1994 – 28 Jan 1995	2
12	Kostya Tszyu	28 Jan 1995 – 31 May 1997	5
13	Vince Phillips	31 May 1997 – 20 Feb 1999	3
14	Terron Millett	20 Feb – 22 Dec 1999	1
Millett relinquished the title due to hand injuries.
15	Zab Judah (def. Jan Piet Bergman)	12 Feb 2000 – 3 Nov 2001	5
16	Kostya Tszyu (2)	3 Nov 2001 – 4 Jun 2005	3
17	Ricky Hatton	4 Jun 2005 – 14 Apr 2006	1
Hatton vacated the title to move up to welterweight and fight WBA champion Luis Collazo rather than fight mandatory challenger Naoufel Ben Rabah.
18	Juan Urango (def. Naoufel Ben Rabah)	30 Jun 2006 – 20 Jan 2007	0
19	Ricky Hatton (2)	20 Jan – 3 Feb 2007	0
Hatton vacated the title after refusing to fight mandatory challenger Lovemore N'dou and instead agreed to a fight with José Luis Castillo.
20	Lovemore N'dou (def. Naoufel Ben Rabah)	4 Feb – 16 Jun 2007	1
21	Paulie Malignaggi	16 Jun 2007 – 2 Oct 2008	1
Malignaggi vacated the title after refusing to participate in a rematch with mandatory challenger Herman Ngoudjo and instead agreed to a fight with Ricky Hatton.
22	Juan Urango (2) (def. Herman Ngoudjo)	30 Jan 2009 – 6 Mar 2010	1
23	Devon Alexander	6 Mar – 22 Oct 2010	1
Alexander was stripped of the title after failing to negotiate terms with mandatory challenger Kaizer Mabuza and instead agreed to a unification fight with WBO champion Timothy Bradley.
24	Zab Judah (2) (def. Kaizer Mabuza)	5 Mar – 23 Jul 2011	0
25	Amir Khan	23 Jul – 10 Dec 2011	0
26	Lamont Peterson	10 Dec 2011 – 11 Apr 2015	3
Peterson was stripped of the title after he lost a non-title fight against unified WBC/WBA champion Danny Garcia at a catchweight of 143 pounds.
27	César Cuenca (def. Ik Yang)	18 Jul – 4 Nov 2015	0
28	Eduard Troyanovsky	4 Nov 2015 – 3 Dec 2016	2
29	Julius Indongo	3 Dec 2016 – 19 Aug 2017	1
30	Terence Crawford	19 Aug – 30 Aug 2017	0
Crawford vacated the title after refusing to negotiate terms with mandatory challenger Sergey Lipinets, citing an inability to make the fight under the IBF's time frame.
31	Sergey Lipinets (def. Akihiro Kondo)	4 Nov 2017 – 10 Mar 2018	0
32	Mikey Garcia	10 Mar – 15 Apr 2018	0
Garcia vacated the title after deciding to move back down in weight and defend his WBC lightweight world title rather than face IBF mandatory challenger Ivan Baranchyk.
33	Ivan Baranchyk (def. Anthony Yigit)	27 Oct 2018 – 18 May 2019	0
34	Josh Taylor	18 May 2019 – 24 Aug 2022	4
Taylor vacates the title after opting for a rematch with Jack Catterall instead of fighting his mandatory challenger Jeremias Ponce.
35	Subriel Matías (def. Jeremias Ponce)	25 Feb 2023 – 15 Jun 2024	1
36	Liam Paro	15 Jun – 7 Dec 2024	0
37	Richardson Hitchins	7 Dec 2024 – 20 Apr 2026	1
Hitchins vacated the title to move up to welterweight.

== Lightweight ==
No.	Name	Reign	Defenses
1	Charlie Brown (def. Melvin Paul)	30 Jan – 15 Apr 1984	0
2	Harry Arroyo	15 Apr 1984 – 6 Apr 1985	2
3	Jimmy Paul	6 Apr 1985 – 5 Dec 1986	3
4	Greg Haugen	5 Dec 1986 – 7 Jun 1987	0
5	Vinny Paz	7 Jun 1987 – 6 Feb 1988	0
6	Greg Haugen (2)	6 Feb 1988 – 18 Feb 1989	2
7	Pernell Whitaker	18 Feb 1989 – 28 Feb 1992	8
Whitaker wanted to move up to junior welterweight. The title was vacated on IBF's February 1992 ratings posted on 28 February.
8	Freddie Pendleton (def. Tracy Spann)	10 Jan 1993 – 19 Feb 1994	1
9	Rafael Ruelas	19 Feb 1994 – 6 May 1995	2
10	Oscar De La Hoya	6 May – 12 Jul 1995	0
De La Hoya vacated the title after refusing to negotiate terms with mandatory challenger Miguel Julio and instead accepted a fight with Genaro Hernández.
11	Philip Holiday (def. Miguel Julio)	19 Aug 1995 – 2 Aug 1997	6
12	Shane Mosley	2 Aug 1997 – 13 May 1999	8
Mosley vacated the title to move up to welterweight.
13	Paul Spadafora (def. Israel Cardona)	20 Aug 1999 – 26 Jun 2003	8
Spadafora vacated the title to move up to junior welterweight.
14	Javier Jáuregui (def. Leavander Johnson)	22 Nov 2003 – 13 May 2004	0
15	Julio Díaz	13 May 2004 – 2 Feb 2005	0
Díaz vacated the title after withdrawing from a fight with mandatory challenger Leavander Johnson scheduled for 11 February and instead agreed to a fight with WBC champion José Luis Castillo.
16	Leavander Johnson (def. Stefano Zoff)	17 Jun – 17 Sep 2005	0
17	Jesús Chávez	17 Sep 2005 – 3 Feb 2007	1
18	Julio Díaz (2)	3 Feb – 13 Oct 2007	1
19	Juan Díaz	13 Oct 2007 – 8 Mar 2008	0
20	Nate Campbell	8 Mar 2008 – 13 Feb 2009	0
Campbell was stripped of his unified IBF and WBO world titles after failing to make weight the day before his fight against Ali Funeka.
21	Miguel Vázquez (def. Kim Ji-Hoon)	14 Aug 2010 – 13 Sep 2014	6
22	Mickey Bey	13 Sep 2014 – 25 Jun 2015	0
Bey vacated the title after withdrawing from a scheduled defense against Denis Shafikov.
23	Rances Barthelemy (def. Denis Shafikov)	18 Dec 2015 – 6 Jun 2016	1
Barthelemy vacated the title to move up to junior welterweight.
24	Robert Easter Jr. (def. Richard Commey)	9 Sep 2016 – 28 Jul 2018	3
25	Mikey Garcia	28 Jul – 30 Oct 2018	0
Garcia vacated the title to move up to welterweight to pursue a fight with Errol Spence Jr.
26	Richard Commey (def. Isa Chaniev)	2 Feb – 14 Dec 2019	1
27	Teófimo López	14 Dec 2019 – 27 Nov 2021	1
28	George Kambosos Jr	27 Nov 2021 – 5 Jun 2022	0
29	Devin Haney	5 Jun 2022 – 29 Nov 2023	2
Haney vacated the title to move up to junior welterweight.
30	Vasiliy Lomachenko (def. George Kambosos Jr)	11 May 2024 – 9 Jun 2025	0
Lomachenko announced his retirement on 5 June. IBF elevated interim champion Muratalla to world champion on 9 June.
31	Raymond Muratalla (interim champion promoted)	9 Jun 2025 – 2 Sep 2026	2
Muratalla vacates the title to move up to junior welterweight.

== Junior lightweight ==
No.	Name	Reign	Defenses
1	Yuh Hwan-kil (def. Rod Sequenan)	22 Apr 1984 – 15 Feb 1985	1
2	Lester Ellis	15 Feb – 12 Jul 1985	1
3	Barry Michael	12 Jul 1985 – 9 Sep 1987	3
4	Rocky Lockridge	9 Sep 1987 – 23 Jul 1988	2
5	Tony Lopez	23 Jul 1988 – 7 Oct 1989	3
6	John John Molina	7 Oct 1989 – 20 May 1990	1
7	Tony Lopez (2)	20 May 1990 – 13 Sep 1991	4
8	Brian Mitchell	13 Sep 1991 – 24 Jan 1992	0
Mitchell retired.
9	John John Molina (2) (def. Jackie Gunguluza)	22 Feb 1992 – 20 Feb 1995	7
Molina vacates the title stay at lightweight.
10	Eddie Hopson (def. Moises Pedroza)	22 Apr – 9 Jul 1995	0
11	Tracy Harris Patterson	9 Jul – 15 Dec 1995	0
12	Arturo Gatti	15 Dec 1995 – 8 Feb 1998	3
Gatti vacated the title to move up to lightweight. Earliest report of the title being vacant was on 8 February.
13	Robert Garcia (def. Harold Warren)	13 Mar 1998 – 23 Oct 1999	2
14	Diego Corrales	23 Oct 1999 – 22 Oct 2000	3
Corrales vacated the title to focus in his trial on felony charges of him assaulting his wife. He later claimed that it was relinquished without his consent. The title was vacated by his manager Cameron Dunkin so that one of Dunkin's other clients, Steve Forbes, could fight for it.
15	Steve Forbes (def. John Brown)	3 Dec 2000 – 17 Aug 2002	1
Forbes was stripped of the title after failing to make weight the day before his fight with David Santos.
16	Carlos Hernández (def. David Santos)	1 Feb 2003 – 31 Jul 2004	1
17	Erik Morales	31 Jul – 21 Sep 2004	0
Morales is stripped of the title for refusing to fight his mandatory challenger.
18	Robbie Peden (def. Nate Campbell)	23 Feb – 17 Sep 2005	0
19	Marco Antonio Barrera	17 Sep 2005 – 19 Apr 2006	0
Barrera's title is vacated on IBF's April 2006 rankings posted on 19 April.
20	Cassius Baloyi (def. Manuel Medina)	31 May – 29 Jul 2006	0
21	Gairy St. Clair	29 Jul – 4 Nov 2006	0
22	Malcolm Klassen	4 Nov 2006 – 20 Apr 2007	0
23	Mzonke Fana	20 Apr 2007 – 12 Apr 2008	1
24	Cassius Baloyi (2)	12 Apr 2008 – 18 Apr 2009	1
25	Malcolm Klassen (2)	18 Apr – 22 Aug 2009	1
26	Robert Guerrero	22 Aug 2009 – 16 Feb 2010	0
Guerrero vacated the title to spend time with his wife during her struggle with leukemia.
27	Mzonke Fana (2) (def. Cassius Baloyi)	1 Sep 2010 – 19 May 2011	0
Fana was stripped for failing to comply with his mandatory title defense against Argenis Méndez.
28	Juan Carlos Salgado (def. Argenis Méndez)	10 Sep 2011 – 9 Mar 2013	2
29	Argenis Mendez	9 Mar 2013 – 10 Jul 2014	2
30	Rances Barthelemy	10 Jul 2014 – 10 Feb 2015	1
Barthelemy, citing he could no longer make the 130-pound limit, vacated the title to move up to lightweight.
31	José Pedraza (def. Andrey Klimov)	13 Jun 2015 – 13 Jan 2017	2
32	Gervonta Davis	13 Jan – 25 Aug 2017	1
Davis was stripped of the title for failing to make weight before his fight against Francisco Fonseca.
33	Tevin Farmer (def. Billy Dib)	3 Aug 2018 – 30 Jan 2020	4
34	Joseph Diaz	30 Jan 2020 – 12 Feb 2021	0
Diaz was stripped of the title after he failed to make weight for his fight against Shavkat Rakhimov.
35	Kenichi Ogawa (def. Azinga Fuzile)	27 Nov 2021 – 4 Jun 2022	0
36	Joe Cordina	4 Jun – 3 Oct 2022	0
Cordina was stripped of the title after canceling his fight with mandatory challenger Shavkat Rakhimov due to a hand injury.
37	Shavkat Rakhimov (def. Zelfa Barrett)	5 Nov 2022 – 22 Apr 2023	0
38	Joe Cordina (2)	22 Apr 2023 – 18 May 2024	1
39	Anthony Cacace	18 May 2024 – 31 Jan 2025	0
Cacace vacated the title to pursue bigger fights.
40	Eduardo Núñez (def. Masanori Rikiishi)	28 May 2025 – 28 Feb 2026	1
41	Emanuel Navarrete	28 Feb – 24 Oct 2026	0
42	O'Shaquie Foster	24 Oct 2026 – present	0

== Featherweight ==
No.	Name	Reign	Defenses
1	Oh Min-keun (def. Joko Arter)	4 Mar 1984 – 29 Nov 1985	2
2	Chung Ki-young	29 Nov 1985 – 30 Oct 1986	2
3	Antonio Rivera	30 Oct 1986 – 23 Jan 1988	0
4	Calvin Grove	23 Jan – 4 Aug 1988	1
5	Jorge Páez	4 Aug 1988 – 14 Mar 1991	8
Paez, who had previously challenged Tony Lopez for the IBF junior lightweight title in September 1990, vacated the title citing his inability to make the featherweight limit.
6	Troy Dorsey (def. Alfred Rangel)	3 Jun – 12 Aug 1991	0
7	Manuel Medina	12 Aug 1991 – 26 Feb 1993	4
8	Tom Johnson	26 Feb 1993 – 8 Feb 1997	11
9	Naseem Hamed	8 Feb – 29 Aug 1997	2
Hamed vacated the title after refusing to negotiate terms with mandatory challenger Héctor Lizárraga.
10	Héctor Lizárraga (def. Welcome Ncita)	13 Dec 1997 – 24 Apr 1998	0
11	Manuel Medina (2)	24 Apr 1998 – 13 Nov 1999	1
12	Paul Ingle	13 Nov 1999 – 16 Dec 2000	1
13	Mbulelo Botile	16 Dec 2000 – 6 Apr 2001	0
14	Frank Toledo	6 Apr – 16 Nov 2001	0
15	Manuel Medina (3)	16 Nov 2001 – 27 Apr 2002	0
16	Johnny Tapia	27 Apr – 1 Oct 2002	0
Tapia was stripped of the title for agreeing to a fight with Marco Antonio Barrera instead of mandatory challenger Juan Manuel Márquez.
17	Juan Manuel Márquez (def. Manuel Medina)	1 Feb 2003 – 16 Aug 2005	4
Marquez was stripped of the title because no promoter was willing to bid at least US$50,000 to stage a mandatory defense against Fahprakorb Rakkiatgym.
18	Valdemir Pereira (def. Fahprakorb Rakkiatgym)	20 Jan – 13 May 2006	0
19	Eric Aiken	13 May – 2 Sep 2006	0
20	Robert Guerrero	2 Sep – 4 Nov 2006	0
Guerrero lost to Orlando Salido but the result was overturned to NC after Salido tested positive of the banned substance Nandrolone. The title is vacated.
21	Robert Guerrero (2) (def. Spend Abazi)	23 Feb 2007 – 23 Jun 2008	2
Guerrero, citing an inability to make weight, vacated the title one day before a scheduled purse bid for a fight with mandatory challenger Orlando Salido.
22	Cristóbal Cruz (def. Orlando Salido)	23 Oct 2008 – 15 May 2010	3
23	Orlando Salido	15 May – 11 Sep 2010	0
24	Yuriorkis Gamboa	11 Sep 2010 – 26 Mar 2011	0
Gamboa was stripped of the title after skipping an IBF-mandated second weigh-in on the day of his fight with Jorge Solís.
25	Billy Dib (def. Jorge Lacierva)	29 Jul 2011 – 1 Mar 2013	2
26	Evgeny Gradovich	1 Mar 2013 – 30 May 2015	4
27	Lee Selby	30 May 2015 – 19 May 2018	4
28	Josh Warrington	19 May 2018 – 21 Jan 2021	3
Warrington vacated the title after the IBF refused to sanction a proposed unification bout against WBA Regular champion Xu Can.
29	Kid Galahad (def. Jazza Dickens)	7 Aug – 13 Nov 2021	0
30	Kiko Martínez	13 Nov 2021 – 26 Mar 2022	0
31	Josh Warrington (2)	26 Mar – 10 Dec 2022	0
32	Luis Alberto Lopez	10 Dec 2022 – 10 Aug 2024	3
33	Angelo Leo	10 Aug 2024 – present	1

== Junior featherweight ==
No.	Name	Reign	Defenses
1	Bobby Berna (def. Suh Sung-In)	4 Dec 1983 – 15 Apr 1984	0
2	Suh Sung-in	15 Apr 1984 – 3 Jan 1985	1
3	Kim Ji-won	3 Jan 1985 – 12 Dec 1986	4
Kim retires. The title was vacated on IBF's December 1986 ratings posted on 12 December.
4	Lee Seung-hoon (def. Prayurasak Muangsurin)	18 Jan 1987 – 23 Mar 1988	3
Lee is forced to vacate the title when the IBF stops promoting fights in South Korea. Lee was ranked on WBC's March 1988 ratings posted on 23 March, meaning that he had already vacated the title.
5	José Sanabria (def. Moises Fuentes Rocha)	21 May 1988 – 10 Mar 1989	3
6	Fabrice Benichou	10 Mar 1989 – 10 Mar 1990	3
7	Welcome Ncita	10 Mar 1990 – 2 Dec 1992	6
8	Kennedy McKinney	2 Dec 1992 – 20 Aug 1994	5
9	Vuyani Bungu	20 Aug 1994 – 11 Mar 1999	13
Bungu vacated the title to move up in weight.
10	Lehlo Ledwaba (def. John Michael Johnson)	25 May 1999 – 21 Jun 2001	5
11	Manny Pacquiao	23 Jun 2001 – 16 Jan 2004	4
Pacquiao vacates the title to stay at featherweight.
12	Israel Vázquez (def. Jose Luis Valbuena)	25 Mar 2004 – 19 Apr 2006	2
The title is vacated on IBF's April 2006 official ratings posted on 19 April.
13	Steve Molitor (def. Michael Hunter)	10 Nov 2006 – 21 Nov 2008	4
14	Celestino Caballero	21 Nov 2008 – 10 Feb 2010	2
Caballero was stripped of the title because no promoter made an offer for the rights to a defense against mandatory challenger Takalani Ndlovu.
15	Steve Molitor (2) (def. Takalani Ndlovu)	27 Mar 2010 – 26 Mar 2011	1
16	Takalani Ndlovu	26 Mar 2011 – 24 Mar 2012	1
17	Jeffrey Mathebula	24 Mar – 17 Jul 2012	0
18	Nonito Donaire	17 Jul – 13 Oct 2012	0
Donaire vacated the title shortly before his fight with Toshiaki Nishioka in order to avoid paying the IBF's sanctioning fee, citing HBO's lack of interest in purchasing rights for an upcoming mandatory defense against the winner of an 27 October title eliminator between Takalani Ndlovu and Alejandro López.
19	Jonatan Romero (def. Alejandro López)	16 Feb – 17 Aug 2013	0
20	Kiko Martínez	17 Aug 2013 – 6 Sep 2014	2
21	Carl Frampton	6 Sep 2014 – 28 Apr 2016	3
Frampton vacated the title to move up to featherweight and fight Leo Santa Cruz for the WBA title rather than face mandatory challenger Shingo Wake.
22	Jonathan Guzmán (def. Shingo Wake)	20 Jul – 31 Dec 2016	0
23	Yukinori Oguni	31 Dec 2016 – 13 Sep 2017	0
24	Ryosuke Iwasa	13 Sep 2017 – 16 Aug 2018	1
25	TJ Doheny	16 Aug 2018 – 26 Apr 2019	1
26	Daniel Roman	26 Apr 2019 – 30 Jan 2020	0
27	Murodjon Akhmadaliev	30 Jan 2020 – 8 Apr 2023	3
28	Marlon Tapales	8 Apr – 26 Dec 2023	0
29	Naoya Inoue	26 Dec 2023 – present	7

== Bantamweight ==
No.	Name	Reign	Defenses
1	Satoshi Shingaki (def. Elmer Magallano)	15 Apr 1984 – 26 Apr 1985	1
2	Jeff Fenech	26 Apr 1985 – 10 Feb 1987	3
Fenech vacated the title to move up to junior featherweight and fight Samart Payakaroon for the WBC title.
3	Kelvin Seabrooks (def. Miguel Maturana)	15 May 1987 – 9 Jul 1988	3
4	Orlando Canizales	9 Jul 1988 – 21 Dec 1994	15
Canizales moves up and was scheduled to challenge for the WBA junior featherweight title. His title is vacated on IBF's December 1994 ratings posted on 21 December.
5	Harold Mestre (def. Juvenal Berrio)	21 Jan – 29 Apr 1995	0
6	Mbulelo Botile	29 Apr 1995 – 19 Jul 1997	5
7	Tim Austin	19 Jul 1997 – 15 Feb 2003	9
8	Rafael Márquez	15 Feb 2003 – 16 Mar 2007	7
Márquez vacated the title to move up to junior featherweight.
9	Luis Alberto Pérez (def. Genaro García)	7 Jul – 19 Sep 2007	0
10	Joseph Agbeko	19 Sep 2007 – 31 Oct 2009	2
11	Yonnhy Pérez	31 Oct 2009 – 11 Dec 2010	2
12	Joseph Agbeko (2)	11 Dec 2010 – 13 Aug 2011	1
13	Abner Mares	13 Aug 2011 – 8 Feb 2012	1
Mares vacated the title to move up to junior featherweight rather than face mandatory challenger Vusi Malinga.
14	Léo Santa Cruz (def. Vusi Malinga)	2 Jun 2012 – 11 Feb 2013	3
Santa Cruz, citing his difficulty making the 118-pound limit, vacated the title to move up to junior featherweight one day before a scheduled purse bid for a fight with mandatory challenger Jamie McDonnell.
15	Jamie McDonnell (def. Julio Ceja)	11 May – 18 Oct 2013	0
McDonnell was stripped of the title for failing to negotiate with mandatory challenger Vusi Malinga.
16	Stuart Hall (def. Vusi Malinga)	21 Dec 2013 – 7 Jun 2014	1
17	Paul Butler	7 Jun – 2 Jul 2014	0
Butler vacated the title to move down to junior bantamweight.
18	Randy Caballero (def. Stuart Hall)	25 Oct 2014 – 20 Nov 2015	0
Caballero was stripped of the title after failing to make weight before his bout with interim IBF champion Lee Haskins. The IBF promoted Haskins to full champion status and the fight was cancelled.
19	Lee Haskins (interim champion promoted)	20 Nov 2015 – 10 Jun 2017	2
20	Ryan Burnett	10 Jun 2017 – 12 Feb 2018	1
WBA/IBF champion Burnett vacated the title after agreeing to fight WBA mandatory challenger Yonfrez Parejo rather than IBF mandatory Emmanuel Rodríguez.
21	Emmanuel Rodríguez (def. Paul Butler)	5 May 2018 – 18 May 2019	1
22	Naoya Inoue	18 May 2019 – 13 Jan 2023	6
Inoue vacated the title to move up to junior featherweight.
23	Emmanuel Rodríguez (2) (def. Melvin Lopez)	12 Aug 2023 – 4 May 2024	0
24	Ryosuke Nishida	4 May 2024 – 8 Jun 2025	1
25	Junto Nakatani	8 Jun – 18 Sep 2025	0
Nakatani vacated the title to move up to junior featherweight.
26	José Salas (def. Landile Ngxeke)	13 Dec 2025 – Present	0

== Junior bantamweight ==
No.	Name	Reign	Defenses
1	Chun Ju-do (def. Ken Kasugai)	10 Dec 1983 – 3 May 1985	5
2	Ellyas Pical	3 May 1985 – 15 Feb 1986	2
3	Cesar Polanco	15 Feb – 5 Jul 1986	0
4	Ellyas Pical (2)	5 Jul 1986 – 18 Mar 1987	1
Pical, who also held the WBA title, was stripped of the IBF title after a loss of the WBA title by TKO to Khaosai Galaxy in Jakarta, Indonesia. The title was stripped on WBA's ratings posted on 18 March.
5	Chang Tae-il (def. Kwin Soon-Chun)	17 May – 17 Oct 1987	0
6	Ellyas Pical (3)	17 Oct 1987 – 14 Oct 1989	3
7	Juan Polo Pérez	14 Oct 1989 – 21 Apr 1990	0
8	Robert Quiroga	21 Apr 1990 – 16 Jan 1993	5
9	Julio César Borboa	16 Jan 1993 – 29 Aug 1994	5
10	Harold Grey	29 Aug 1994 – 7 Oct 1995	3
11	Carlos Gabriel Salazar	7 Oct 1995 – 27 Apr 1996	1
12	Harold Grey (2)	27 Apr – 24 Aug 1996	0
13	Danny Romero	24 Aug 1996 – 18 Jul 1997	2
14	Johnny Tapia	18 Jul 1997 – 22 Dec 1998	2
Tapia's title is vacated on IBF's December 1998 ratings posted on 22 December; just days after winning the WBA bantamweight.
15	Mark Johnson (def. Ratanachai Sor Vorapin)	24 Apr 1999 – 12 Feb 2000	2
Johnson was stripped of the title after being incarcerated for 1 year.
16	Félix Machado (def. Julio Gamboa)	22 Jul 2000 – 4 Jan 2003	3
17	Luis Alberto Pérez	4 Jan 2003 – 3 Nov 2006	3
Pérez was stripped of the title after failing to make weight the day before his scheduled defense against Ricardo Vargas. Arizona Boxing Commission chief John Montano cancelled the fight, citing safety and contractual reasons.
18	Dimitri Kirilov (def. José Navarro)	13 Oct 2007 – 2 Aug 2008	1
19	Vic Darchinyan	2 Aug 2008 – 28 Jul 2009	2
Darchinyan vacated the title after refusing to negotiate terms with mandatory challenger Simphiwe Nongqayi.
20	Simphiwe Nongqayi (def. Jorge Arce)	15 Sep 2009 – 31 Jul 2010	1
21	Juan Alberto Rosas	31 Jul – 11 Dec 2010	0
22	Cristian Mijares	11 Dec 2010 – 17 Aug 2011	2
Mijares vacated the title to move up to junior featherweight.
23	Rodrigo Guerrero (def. Raúl Martínez)	8 Oct 2011 – 11 Feb 2012	0
24	Juan Carlos Sánchez Jr.	11 Feb 2012 – 8 Jun 2013	2
Sánchez was stripped of the title after failing to make weight the day before his fight against Roberto Domingo Sosa.
25	Daiki Kameda (def. Rodrigo Guerrero)	3 Sep 2013 – 19 Mar 2014	0
Kameda vacated the title citing difficulties making weight. He was defeated by Liborio Solís in his only defense on 3 December 2013 but retained the title as Solis failed to make weight for the bout.
26	Zolani Tete (def. Teiru Kinoshita)	18 Jul 2014 – 7 Jun 2015	1
Tete vacated the title after refusing to accept the results of a purse bid for a fight with mandatory challenger McJoe Arroyo.
27	McJoe Arroyo (def. Arthur Villanueva)	18 Jul 2015 – 3 Sep 2016	0
28	Jerwin Ancajas	3 Sep 2016 – 22 Feb 2022	9
29	Fernando Martínez	22 Feb 2022 – 29 Oct 2024	3
Martinez vacated the title.
30	Willibaldo García (def. Rene Calixto)	23 May 2025 – 6 Jun 2026	0
31	Andrew Moloney	6 Jun 2026 – present	0

== Flyweight ==
No.	Name	Reign	Defenses
1	Kwon Soon-chun (def. Rene Busayong)	24 Dec 1983 – 20 Dec 1985	6
2	Chung Jong-kwan	20 Dec 1985 – 27 Apr 1986	0
3	Jung Bi-won	27 Apr – 2 Aug 1986	0
4	Shin Hi-sup	2 Aug 1986 – 22 Feb 1987	1
5	Dodie Boy Peñalosa	22 Feb – 5 Sep 1987	0
6	Choi Chang-ho	5 Sep 1987 – 16 Jan 1988	0
7	Rolando Bohol	16 Jan – 5 Oct 1988	1
8	Duke McKenzie	5 Oct 1988 – 7 Jun 1989	1
9	Dave McAuley	7 Jun 1989 – 11 Jun 1992	5
10	Rodolfo Blanco	11 Jun – 29 Nov 1992	0
11	Pichit Sitbangprachan	29 Nov 1992 – 25 Nov 1994	5
Sitbangprachan retires.
12	Francisco Tejedor (def. Jose Luis Zepeda)	18 Feb – 22 Apr 1995	0
13	Danny Romero	22 Apr 1995 – 1 Jan 1996	1
Romero, citing he could no longer make the 112-pound limit, vacated the title to move up to junior bantamweight.
14	Mark Johnson (def. Francisco Tejedor)	4 May 1996 – Sep 7, 1998	7
Johnson, citing weight problems, vacated the title to move up to junior bantamweight and pursue a fight with Johnny Tapia, which never materialized.
15	Irene Pacheco (def. Luis Cox Coronado)	10 Apr 1999 – 16 Dec 2004	6
16	Vic Darchinyan	16 Dec 2004 – 7 Jul 2007	5
17	Nonito Donaire	7 Jul 2007 – 14 Jul 2009	3
Donaire vacated the title after choosing to move up to junior bantamweight. The title is vacated on IBF's July 2009 rankings posted on 14 July.
18	Moruti Mthalane (def. Julio César Miranda)	20 Nov 2009 – 13 Jan 2014	4
Mthalane vacated the title and withdrew from a fight with mandatory challenger Amnat Ruenroeng citing the low purse offered.
19	Amnat Ruenroeng (def. Rocky Fuentes)	22 Jan 2014 – 28 May 2016	5
20	John Riel Casimero	28 May – 20 Dec 2016	1
Casimero vacated the title to move up to junior bantamweight.
21	Donnie Nietes (def. Komgrich Nantapech)	29 Apr 2017 – 11 Apr 2018	1
Nietes vacated the title to move up to junior bantamweight.
22	Moruti Mthalane (2) (def. Muhammad Waseem)	15 Jul 2018 – 30 Apr 2021	3
23	Sunny Edwards	30 Apr 2021 – 16 Dec 2023	4
24	Jesse Rodriguez	16 Dec 2023 – 27 Mar 2024	0
Rodriguez vacated the title to move up to junior bantamweight.
25	Ángel Ayala (def. Dave Apolinario)	9 Aug 2024 – 29 Mar 2025	0
26	Masamichi Yabuki	29 Mar 2025 – Present	2

== Junior flyweight ==
No.	Name	Reign	Defenses
1	Dodie Boy Peñalosa (def. Satoshi Shingaki)	10 Dec 1983 – 18 Jul 1986	3
Peñalosa was stripped of the title for failing to make a mandatory defense by a 15 July deadline.
2	Choi Jum-hwan (def. Park Cho-Woon)	7 Dec 1986 – 4 Nov 1988	3
3	Tacy Macalos	4 Nov 1988 – 2 May 1989	0
4	Muangchai Kittikasem	2 May 1989 – 29 Jul 1990	3
5	Michael Carbajal	29 Jul 1990 – 19 Feb 1994	9
6	Humberto González	19 Feb 1994 – 15 Jul 1995	3
7	Saman Sorjaturong	15 Jul – 17 Nov 1995	1
Sorjaturong was stripped of the title for not fighting his mandatory challenger.
8	Michael Carbajal (2) (def. Melchor Cob Castro)	16 Mar 1996 – 18 Jan 1997	2
9	Mauricio Pastrana	18 Jan – 9 May 1997	0
Pastrana was stripped of the title after withdrawing from a fight with Manuel Herrera due to epididymitis.
10	Mauricio Pastrana (2) (def. Manuel Herrera)	13 Dec 1997 – 28 Aug 1998	1
Pastrana was stripped of the title after failing to make weight the day before his bout with Carlos Murillo.
11	Will Grigsby (def. Ratanapol Sor Vorapin)	18 Dec 1998 – 2 Oct 1999	1
12	Ricardo López	2 Oct 1999 – 27 Nov 2002	3
López retires.
13	Víctor Burgos (def. Alex Sánchez)	15 Feb 2003 – 14 May 2005	2
14	Will Grigsby (2)	14 May 2005 – 7 Jan 2006	0
15	Ulises Solís	7 Jan 2006 – 19 Apr 2009	8
16	Brian Viloria	19 Apr 2009 – 23 Jan 2010	1
17	Carlos Tamara	23 Jan – 29 May 2010	0
18	Luis Alberto Lazarte	29 May 2010 – 30 Apr 2011	2
19	Ulises Solís (2)	30 Apr 2011 – 20 Jul 2012	1
Solís was stripped of the title due to inactivity stemming from injuries suffered during a street fight against Canelo Álvarez in October 2011.
20	John Riel Casimero (interim champion promoted)	20 Jul 2012 – 2 May 2014	4
Casimero was stripped of the title after failing to make weight the day before his fight against Mauricio Fuentes.
21	Javier Mendoza (def. Ramón García Hirales)	20 Sep 2014 – 29 Dec 2015	1
22	Akira Yaegashi	29 Dec 2015 – 21 May 2017	2
23	Milan Melindo	21 May – 31 Dec 2017	1
24	Ryoichi Taguchi	31 Dec 2017 – 20 May 2018	0
25	Hekkie Budler	20 May – 25 July 2018	0
Budler vacated the title, citing the low purse to defend it against his mandatory challenger Felix Alvarado.
26	Felix Alvarado (def. Randy Petalcorin)	29 Oct 2018 – 21 Mar 2022	2
Alvarado vacated the title move up to flyweight.
27	Sivenathi Nontshinga (def. Hector Flores)	3 Sep 2022 – 4 Nov 2023	1
28	Adrian Curiel	4 Nov 2023 – 16 Feb 2024	0
29	Sivenathi Nontshinga (2)	16 Feb – 12 Oct 2024	0
30	Masamichi Yabuki	12 Oct 2024 – 10 Apr 2025	0
Yabuki vacated the title to stay at flyweight.
31	Thanongsak Simsri (def. Christian Araneta)	19 Jun 2025 – present	2

== Mini flyweight ==
No.	Name	Reign	Defenses
1	Kyung-Yung Lee (def. Masaharu Kawakami)	14 Jun – Dec 1987	0
Lee vacated the title to focus on winning the WBC mini flyweight title.
2	Samuth Sithnaruepol (def. Domingo Lucas)	24 Mar 1988 – 17 Jun 1989	2
3	Nico Thomas	17 Jun – 21 Sep 1989	0
4	Eric Chavez	21 Sep 1989 – 22 Feb 1990	0
5	Fahlan Sakkreerin	22 Feb 1990 – 6 Sep 1992	7
6	Manny Melchor	6 Sep – 10 Dec 1992	0
7	Ratanapol Sor Vorapin	10 Dec 1992 – 15 Mar 1996	12
Sor Vorapin was stripped of the title after failing to make weight the day before his fight with Lee Sandoval.
8	Ratanapol Sor Vorapin (2) (def. Jun Arlos)	18 May 1996 – 27 Dec 1997	6
9	Zolani Petelo	27 Dec 1997 – 2 Nov 2000	5
Petelo's title is vacated on IBF's Oct 2000 ratings posted on 2 November to move up to junior flyweight.
10	Roberto Carlos Leyva (def. Daniel Reyes)	29 Apr 2001 – 9 Aug 2002	1
11	Miguel Barrera	9 Aug 2002 – 31 May 2003	1
12	Edgar Cárdenas	31 May – 4 Oct 2003	0
13	Daniel Reyes	4 Oct 2003 – 14 Sep 2004	1
14	Muhammad Rachman	14 Sep 2004 – 7 Jul 2007	3
15	Florante Condes	7 Jul 2007 – 14 Jun 2008	0
16	Raúl García	14 Jun 2008 – 26 Mar 2010	4
17	Nkosinathi Joyi	26 Mar 2010 – 1 Sep 2012	4
18	Mario Rodríguez	1 Sep 2012 – 30 Mar 2013	0
19	Katsunari Takayama	30 Mar 2013 – 9 Aug 2014	2
20	Francisco Rodríguez Jr.	9 Aug – 1 Oct 2014	0
Rodríguez's title was vacated when a bout was ordered for the vacant title on 1 October.
21	Katsunari Takayama (2) (def. Go Odaira)	31 Dec 2014 – 31 Dec 2015	2
22	José Argumedo	31 Dec 2015 – 23 Jul 2017	3
23	Hiroto Kyoguchi	23 Jul 2017 – 11 Aug 2018	2
Kyoguchi vacated the title to move up to junior flyweight.
24	Carlos Licona (def. Mark Anthony Barriga)	1 Dec 2018 – 16 Feb 2019	0
25	Deejay Kriel	16 Feb – 4 Jul 2019	0
Kriel vacated the title to move up to junior flyweight.
26	Pedro Taduran (def. Samuel Salva)	7 Sep 2019 – 27 Feb 2021	1
27	Rene Mark Cuarto	27 Feb 2021 – 1 Jul 2022	1
28	Daniel Valladares	1 Jul 2022 – 7 Oct 2023	1
29	Ginjiro Shigeoka	7 Oct 2023 – 28 Jul 2024	1
30	Pedro Taduran (2)	28 Jul 2024 – present	4

== See also ==
- List of current world boxing champions
- List of undisputed boxing champions
- List of WBA world champions
- List of WBC world champions
- List of WBO world champions
- List of The Ring world champions
- List of NYSAC world champions
- List of IBF female world champions
- List of IBO world champions
