= Ki-young =

- Hangul: 기영
- RR: Giyeong
- MR: Kiyŏng

Ki-young, also spelled Ki-yong or Gi-young, is a Korean given name.

People with this name include:

Film and television

- Kim Ki-young (1919–1998), South Korean film director
- Ohm Ki-young (born 1951), South Korean news anchor
- Lee Ki-young (born 1963), South Korean actor
- Kang Ki-young (born 1983), South Korean actor

Sportspeople

- Chung Ki-young (born 1959), South Korean boxer
- Lee Gi-young (referee) (born 1965), South Korean football referee
- Jeon Ki-young (born 1973), South Korean judo practitioner
- Chu Ki-young (born 1977), South Korean javelin thrower
- Im Gi-yeong (born 1993), South Korean baseball catcher

Politicians

- Jang Gi-yeong, South Korean politician; see List of members of the South Korean Constituent Assembly, 1948–50

Writers

- Ri Ki-yong (1895–1984), North Korean novelist
- Hyun Ki-young (born 1941), South Korean novelist

== See also ==
- List of Korean given names
