= Chung Jong-kwan =

South Korean boxer (born 1961)

Personal information
- Born: November 30, 1961 (age 64) Hampyeong, South Korea
- Height: 5 ft 5 1/2 in (166 cm)
- Weight: Flyweight; Super flyweight

Boxing career
- Stance: Orthodox

Boxing record
- Total fights: 32
- Wins: 17
- Win by KO: 7
- Losses: 11
- Draws: 4

Chung Jong-kwan (Korean: 정종관; born November 30, 1961) is a South Korean former professional boxer.

== Professional career ==
Chung turned professional in 1981 and compiled a record of 11–8–2 before facing countryman Kwon Soon-chun in January 1985 for the IBF flyweight title, the bout would end in a draw. He would get another shot at the title by facing Kwon Soon-chun in a rematch six months later, this contest would also end in a draw. Five months later the two would compete in a trilogy bout, this time Chung would stop Soon-chun in the fourth round to win the IBF flyweight title.

== Professional boxing record ==
32 fights	17 wins	11 losses
By knockout	7	3
By decision	10	8
Draws	4	

No.	Result	Record	Opponent	Type	Round, time	Date	Location	Notes
32	Loss	17–11–4	Rolando Bohol	MD	12	1989-08-04	Ninoy Aquino Stadium, Manila, Philippines	For OPBF super-flyweight title
31	Win	17–10–4	Hun Kook Chae	UD	10	1988-12-09	Munhwa Gymnasium, Seoul, South Korea	Retained South Korean super-flyweight title
30	Win	16–10–4	Sung Kwan Jang	KO	5 (10)	1988-07-30	Pusan Sightseeing Hotel, Busan, South Korea	Retained South Korean super-flyweight title
29	Win	15–10–4	Seung Kwan Lee	KO	7 (10)	1988-04-03	Anyang, South Korea	Won vacant South Korean super-flyweight title
28	Win	14–10–4	Hun Duk Jung	KO	5 (10)	1987-12-20	Munhwa Gymnasium, Seoul, South Korea	
27	Loss	13–10–4	Jun Llano	KO	5 (10)	1986-11-07	Munhwa Gymnasium, Seoul, South Korea	
26	Loss	13–9–4	Jung Bi-won	MD	15	1986-04-27	Gudeok Gymnasium, Busan, South Korea	Lost IBF flyweight title
25	Win	13–8–4	Kwon Soon-chun	TKO	4 (15)	1985-12-20	Gudeok Gymnasium, Busan, South Korea	Won IBF flyweight title
24	Draw	12–8–4	Kwon Soon-chun	SD	15	1985-07-17	Masan Gymnasium, Masan, South Korea	For IBF flyweight title
23	Win	12–8–3	Fernando Carupo	PTS	10	1985-04-28	Busan, South Korea	
22	Draw	11–8–3	Kwon Soon-chun	SD	15	1985-01-25	Chungmu Gymnasium, Daejeon, South Korea	For IBF flyweight title
21	Win	11–8–2	Dae Keun Lee	PTS	8	1984-12-04	Munhwa Gymnasium, Seoul, South Korea	
20	Win	10–8–2	Eleoncio Mercedes	KO	5 (10)	1984-07-22	Jangchung Gymnasium, Seoul, South Korea	
19	Win	9–8–2	Wongso Indrajit	PTS	10	1984-05-19	Jakarta, Indonesia	
18	Win	8–8–2	Duk Hwan Bae	KO	2 (8)	1984-04-15	Munhwa Gymnasium, Seoul, South Korea	
17	Win	7–8–2	Yun Lee Moon	PTS	10	1984-01-22	Munhwa Gymnasium, Seoul, South Korea	
16	Win	6–8–2	Ki Ho Shin	PTS	8	1983-11-13	Dowon Gymnasium, Incheon, South Korea	
15	Draw	5–8–2	Kyung Shik Park	PTS	8	1983-03-26	Chungmu Gymnasium, Daejeon, South Korea	
14	Loss	5–8–1	Ho Chul Pyun	PTS	10	1983-02-12	Seoul, South Korea	
13	Loss	5–7–1	Germán Torres	KO	9 (10)	1982-10-31	Munhwa Gymnasium, Seoul, South Korea	
12	Win	5–6–1	Allan Makitoki	PTS	10	1982-09-19	Kudok Gymnasium, Busan, South Korea	
11	Loss	4–6–1	Candelario Carmona	PTS	10	1982-06-20	Indoor Gymnasium, Gwangju, South Korea	
10	Win	4–5–1	Hwa Kyu Lee	PTS	10	1982-05-07	Jangchung Gymnasium, Seoul, South Korea	
9	Loss	3–5–1	Chang Jung-koo	RTD	6 (10)	1982-02-10	Gyeongbuk Gymnasium, Daegu, South Korea	
8	Draw	3–4–1	Moon Jin Choi	PTS	5	1981-12-27	Munhwa Gymnasium, Seoul, South Korea	
7	Win	3–4	Chul Yong Park	RTD	5 (8)	1981-11-01	Gudeok Gymnasium, Busan, South Korea	
6	Loss	2–4	Kong Ok Jun	PTS	6	1981-09-19	Chungmu Gymnasium, Daejeon, South Korea	
5	Loss	2–3	Mal Oh Ji	PTS	6	1981-08-30	Jangchung Gymnasium, Seoul, South Korea	
4	Win	2–2	Kwang Bok Yun	PTS	4	1981-08-02	Munhwa Gymnasium, Seoul, South Korea	
3	Loss	1–2	Ki Ho Jung	PTS	4	1981-06-07	Munhwa Gymnasium, Seoul, South Korea	
2	Loss	1–1	Bok Young Kim	PTS	4	1981-05-09	Seoul, South Korea	
1	Win	1–0	Sung Chul Kim	PTS	4	1981-05-06	Seoul Stadium, Seoul, South Korea	

== See also ==
- List of male boxers
- List of Korean boxers
- List of world flyweight boxing champions

Sporting positions
Regional boxing titles
Vacant Title last held by Joon Huh	South Korean super-flyweight champion April 3, 1988 - 1989; Vacated	Vacant Title next held by Byung Kwan Jung
World boxing titles
Preceded by Kwon Soon-chun	IBF flyweight champion December 20, 1985 – April 27, 1986	Succeeded by Jung Bi-won
