= Jung Bi-won =

South Korean boxer (born 1960)

Personal information
- Born: January 15, 1960 (age 66) Seoul, South Korea
- Height: 5 ft 5 1/2 in (166 cm)
- Weight: Light flyweight; Flyweight

Boxing career
- Stance: Orthodox

Boxing record
- Total fights: 37
- Wins: 28
- Win by KO: 10
- Losses: 7
- Draws: 2

Jung Bi-won (Korean: 정비원; born January 15, 1960) is a South Korean former professional boxer.

== Professional career ==
Jung made his professional debut against Sun-Tae Lee on 27 February 1982 at the Munhwa Gymnasium in Seoul.

== Professional boxing record ==
37 fights	28 wins	7 losses
By knockout	10	2
By decision	18	5
Draws	2	

No.	Result	Record	Opponent	Type	Round, time	Date	Location	Notes
37	Loss	28–7–2	Romy Navarrete	RTD	8 (12)	1989-06-30	Araneta Coliseum, Quezon City, Philippines	For OPBF flyweight title
36	Win	28–6–2	Dae Chul Kim	KO	3 (8)	1989-04-16	Pohang Gymnasium, Pohang, South Korea	
35	Win	27–6–2	Byung Ki Chung	TKO	7 (10)	1989-01-29	Pohang Gymnasium, Pohang, South Korea	
34	Loss	26–6–2	Dodie Boy Peñalosa	UD	10	1988-09-02	Araneta Coliseum, Quezon City, Philippines	
33	Win	26–5–2	Min Woong Suh	TD	10 (10)	1988-06-05	KBS Hall, Ulsan, South Korea	
32	Win	25–5–2	Den Chuwatana	PTS	10	1988-02-21	88 Gymnasium, Seoul, South Korea	
31	Win	24–5–2	Rittichai Lukmingkwan	KO	8 (10)	1987-12-20	High School Gymnasium, Pyeongtaek, South Korea	
30	Win	23–5–2	Chung Sup Chun	KO	4 (10)	1987-09-13	Student Gymnasium, Jinju, South Korea	
29	Win	22–5–2	Daorung Chuvatana	PTS	10	1987-06-27	Jochiwon Highschool, Jochiwon, South Korea	
28	Win	21–5–2	Ronnie Vallescas	KO	3 (10)	1987-03-14	Chuncheon Gymnasium, Chuncheon, South Korea	
27	Win	20–5–2	Rolando Protacio	KO	4 (10)	1986-12-20	Bucheon, South Korea	
26	Loss	19–5–2	Shin Hi-sup	TKO	15 (15)	1986-08-02	Incheon Gymnasium, Incheon, South Korea	Lost IBF flyweight title
25	Win	19–4–2	Chung Jong-kwan	MD	15	1986-04-27	Gudeok Gymnasium, Busan, South Korea	Won IBF flyweight title
24	Win	18–4–2	Oh Kong Son	PTS	10	1985-12-28	Suwon, South Korea	
23	Win	17–4–2	Boy Samson	TKO	2 (10)	1985-10-19	Nonsan, South Korea	
22	Win	16–4–2	Benjie Miole	PTS	10	1985-05-25	Boeun County, South Korea	
21	Win	15–4–2	Soon Jung Kang	PTS	10	1985-04-14	Pohang Gymnasium, Pohang, South Korea	
20	Win	14–4–2	Keum Sub Han	PTS	10	1985-02-16	Munhwa Gymnasium, Seoul, South Korea	
19	Win	13–4–2	Soon Jung Kang	PTS	10	1984-12-08	Indoor Gymnasium, Cheongju, South Korea	
18	Loss	12–4–2	Do Sa Kim	PTS	10	1984-09-08	Munhwa Gymnasium, Seoul, South Korea	
17	Loss	12–3–2	Germán Torres	UD	10	1984-07-09	Korakuen Hall, Tokyo, Japan	
16	Loss	12–2–2	Yuh Myung-woo	PTS	10	1984-05-27	Munhwa Gymnasium, Seoul, South Korea	
15	Win	12–1–2	Sung Kyu Kim	PTS	6	1984-03-29	Munhwa Gymnasium, Seoul, South Korea	
14	Loss	11–1–2	Jae Hong Kim	PTS	10	1983-07-26	Munhwa Gymnasium, Seoul, South Korea	Lost South Korean light-flyweight title
13	Win	11–0–2	Soo Nyun Ma	PTS	10	1983-05-06	Munhwa Gymnasium, Seoul, South Korea	Won vacant South Korean light-flyweight title
12	Draw	10–0–2	Soo Nyun Ma	PTS	10	1983-04-03	Munhwa Gymnasium, Seoul, South Korea	
11	Win	10–0–1	Tatsuya Sugi	TKO	5 (8)	1983-02-19	Munhwa Gymnasium, Seoul, South Korea	
10	Win	9–0–1	Keum Sub Han	PTS	8	1983-01-22	Masan Gymnasium, Masan, South Korea	
9	Draw	8–0–1	Yun Lee Moon	PTS	6	1982-10-31	Munhwa Gymnasium, Seoul, South Korea	
8	Win	8–0	Ki Young Kim	PTS	6	1982-07-31	Munhwa Gymnasium, Seoul, South Korea	
7	Win	7–0	Jong Bong Choi	PTS	4	1982-06-05	Jangchung Gymnasium, Seoul, South Korea	
6	Win	6–0	Chul Hyun	PTS	4	1982-05-24	Jangchung Gymnasium, Seoul, South Korea	
5	Win	5–0	Kang Hwan Kim	PTS	4	1982-05-23	Jangchung Gymnasium, Seoul, South Korea	
4	Win	4–0	Ki Man Yuh	PTS	4	1982-05-21	Jangchung Gymnasium, Seoul, South Korea	
3	Win	3–0	Keun Pil Jung	KO	2 (4)	1982-04-26	Jangchung Gymnasium, Seoul, South Korea	
2	Win	2–0	Byung Hwa Jung	TKO	2 (4)	1982-03-28	Munhwa Gymnasium, Seoul, South Korea	
1	Win	1–0	Soon Jae Lee	PTS	4	1982-02-28	Munhwa Gymnasium, Seoul, South Korea	

== See also ==
- List of male boxers
- List of Korean boxers
- List of world flyweight boxing champions

Sporting positions
Regional boxing titles
Vacant Title last held by Moon Jin Choi	South Korean light-flyweight champion May 6, 1983 – July 26, 1983	Succeeded by Jae Hong Kim
World boxing titles
Preceded by Chung Jong-kwan	IBF flyweight champion April 27, 1986 – August 2, 1986	Succeeded by Shin Hi-sup
