= Shin Hi-sup =

South Korean boxer (born 1964)

Personal information
- Born: July 29, 1964 Seoul, South Korea
- Died: July 3, 2023 (aged 58)
- Height: 5 ft 7 in (170 cm)
- Weight: Flyweight

Boxing career
- Stance: Southpaw

Boxing record
- Total fights: 41
- Wins: 37
- Win by KO: 21
- Losses: 3
- Draws: 1

Shin Hi-sup (Korean: 신희섭; born July 29, 1964 – July 3, 2023) was a South Korean boxer.

== Professional career ==
In 1980 he successfully started his professional career. On August 2, 1986, he boxed against Jung Bi-won for the IBF world title and won by technical knockout in round 15. However, he lost this belt in his second title defense to Dodie Boy Peñalosa in February of the following year by knockout. After this defeat he retired from boxing.

== Professional boxing record ==
| 41 fights | 37 wins | 3 losses |
|---|---|---|
| By knockout | 21 | 2 |
| By decision | 15 | 1 |
| By disqualification | 1 | 0 |
| Draws | 1 | |

| No. | Result | Record | Opponent | Type | Round, time | Date | Location | Notes |
|---|---|---|---|---|---|---|---|---|
| 41 | Loss | 37–3–1 | Dodie Boy Peñalosa | TKO | 5 (15), 2:10 | 22 Feb 1987 | Dowon Gymnasium, Incheon, South Korea | Lost IBF flyweight title |
| 40 | Win | 37–2–1 | Henry Brent | TKO | 13 (15), 1:37 | 22 Nov 1986 | City Gymnasium, Chuncheon, South Korea | Retained IBF flyweight title |
| 39 | Win | 36–2–1 | Jung Bi-won | TKO | 15 (15), 1:20 | 2 Aug 1986 | Dowon Gymnasium, Incheon, South Korea | Won IBF flyweight title |
| 38 | Win | 35–2–1 | Titing Dignos | TKO | 4 (12), 2:50 | 15 Mar 1986 | Gangil Girl's Highschool, Gangneung, South Korea | Retained OPBF flyweight title |
| 37 | Win | 34–2–1 | Nongberd Naphataya | KO | 3 (12), 2:57 | 15 Dec 1985 | Hanam, South Korea | Retained OPBF flyweight title |
| 36 | Win | 33–2–1 | Sakdisamuth Singsamang | TKO | 5 (12), 2:53 | 13 Jul 1985 | Chungbuk Gymnasium, Cheongju, South Korea | Retained OPBF flyweight title |
| 35 | Win | 32–2–1 | Kid Kanashiro | KO | 1 (10) | 10 Mar 1985 | Daegu, South Korea | |
| 34 | Win | 31–2–1 | Nongberd Naphataya | KO | 6 (12), 3:07 | 8 Dec 1984 | Indoor Gymnasium, Cheongju, South Korea | Retained OPBF flyweight title |
| 33 | Win | 30–2–1 | Rene Busayong | TKO | 3 (12), 1:20 | 17 Jul 1984 | Mokpo University, Mokpo, South Korea | Won vacant OPBF flyweight title |
| 32 | Win | 29–2–1 | Al Tan Lee | KO | 3 (10) | 28 Apr 1984 | Gwangju, South Korea | |
| 31 | Win | 28–2–1 | Ruben De La Cruz | PTS | 10 | 26 Feb 1984 | South Korea | |
| 30 | Win | 27–2–1 | Chalao Muangsurin | PTS | 10 | 20 Nov 1983 | Chungmu Gymnasium, Daejeon, South Korea | |
| 29 | Loss | 26–2–1 | Santos Laciar | TKO | 1 (15), 1:19 | 17 Jul 1983 | Halla Gym, Jeju City, South Korea | For WBA flyweight title |
| 28 | Win | 26–1–1 | Allan Makitoki | KO | 8 (12), 0:25 | 5 Jun 1983 | Chungbuk Gymnasium, Cheongju, South Korea | Retained OPBF flyweight title |
| 27 | Win | 25–1–1 | Edward Bucton | TKO | 9 (10) | 30 Apr 1983 | Munhwa Gymnasium, Seoul, South Korea | |
| 26 | Win | 24–1–1 | Hong Soo Yang | KO | 9 (12), 0:12 | 29 Jan 1983 | Munhwa Gymnasium, Seoul, South Korea | Won OPBF flyweight title |
| 25 | Win | 23–1–1 | Wonchai Singchatvan | KO | 4 (10) | 18 Dec 1982 | Daejeon, South Korea | |
| 24 | Win | 22–1–1 | Siony Carupo | PTS | 10 | 9 Oct 1982 | Jangchung Gymnasium, Seoul, South Korea | |
| 23 | Win | 21–1–1 | Jun Resma | KO | 7 (10) | 18 Sep 1982 | Jeonju Gymnasium, Jeonju, South Korea | |
| 22 | Win | 20–1–1 | Rodrigo Saonoy | PTS | 10 | 7 Aug 1982 | Munhwa Gymnasium, Seoul, South Korea | |
| 21 | Win | 19–1–1 | Ramon Chan | TKO | 7 (10) | 19 Jun 1982 | Munhwa Gymnasium, Seoul, South Korea | |
| 20 | Win | 18–1–1 | Andy Balaba | KO | 10 (10), 2:35 | 7 May 1982 | Jangchung Gymnasium, Seoul, South Korea | Balaba, 28, dies as a result of injuries sustained in this fight. |
| 19 | Win | 17–1–1 | Hyung Shik Lim | KO | 7 (10) | 18 Apr 1982 | Jeonju Gymnasium, Jeonju, South Korea | |
| 18 | Win | 16–1–1 | Mal Oh Ji | KO | 3 (10) | 4 Apr 1982 | Gudeok Gymnasium, Busan, South Korea | |
| 17 | Win | 15–1–1 | Chul Yong Park | UD | 10 | 20 Feb 1982 | Kudok Gymnasium, Busan, South Korea | |
| 16 | Win | 14–1–1 | Suriya Patumwadee | KO | 5 (10) | 24 Jan 1982 | Chungmu Gymnasium, Daejeon, South Korea | |
| 15 | Win | 13–1–1 | Hiroyuki Tada | PTS | 10 | 16 Dec 1981 | Miyagi Sports Center, Sendai, Japan | |
| 14 | Win | 12–1–1 | Young Chul Hong | TKO | 1 (8) | 31 Oct 1981 | Jangchung Gymnasium, Seoul, South Korea | |
| 13 | Win | 11–1–1 | Rord Mitsuru | PTS | 6 | 31 Aug 1981 | Munhwa Gymnasium, Seoul, South Korea | |
| 12 | Win | 10–1–1 | Min Woong Kim | PTS | 6 | 24 May 1981 | Jangchung Gymnasium, Seoul, South Korea | |
| 11 | Win | 9–1–1 | Bok Young Kim | PTS | 4 | 22 May 1981 | Jangchung Gymnasium, Seoul, South Korea | |
| 10 | Win | 8–1–1 | Young Hyun Han | PTS | 4 | 17 May 1981 | Jangchung Gymnasium, Seoul, South Korea | |
| 9 | Win | 7–1–1 | Young Jun Ahn | PTS | 4 | 9 May 1981 | Seoul, South Korea | |
| 8 | Win | 6–1–1 | Jung Hwan Kim | PTS | 4 | 6 May 1981 | Seoul Stadium, Seoul, South Korea | |
| 7 | Draw | 5–1–1 | Young Hyun Han | PTS | 4 | 29 Mar 1981 | Munhwa Gymnasium, Seoul, South Korea | |
| 6 | Win | 5–1 | Kun Jae Lee | PTS | 4 | 23 Jan 1981 | Gudeok Gymnasium, Busan, South Korea | |
| 5 | Loss | 4–1 | Chang Jung-koo | PTS | 4 | 29 Nov 1980 | Munhwa Gymnasium, Seoul, South Korea | |
| 4 | Win | 4–0 | Yong Hyun Kim | KO | 2 (4) | 23 Nov 1980 | Munhwa Gymnasium, Seoul, South Korea | |
| 3 | Win | 3–0 | Sang Kyu Oh | PTS | 4 | 22 Nov 1980 | Munhwa Gymnasium, Seoul, South Korea | |
| 2 | Win | 2–0 | Se Bong Kim | PTS | 4 | 19 Nov 1980 | Munhwa Gymnasium, Seoul, South Korea | |
| 1 | Win | 1–0 | Jong Kyu Kim | DQ | 4 (4) | 17 Nov 1980 | Munhwa Gymnasium, Seoul, South Korea | |

== Death ==
Shin Hi-sup died on July 3, 2023, at the age of 58.

== See also ==
- List of male boxers
- List of Korean boxers
- List of southpaw stance boxers
- List of world flyweight boxing champions

Sporting positions
Regional boxing titles
| Preceded by Hong Soo Yang | OPBF flyweight champion January 29, 1983 - 1983; Vacated | Vacant Title next held by Himself |
| Vacant Title last held by Himself | OPBF flyweight champion July 17, 1984 - August 2, 1986; Won world title | Vacant Title next held by Thanomsak Sithbaobay |
World boxing titles
| Preceded by Jung Bi-won | IBF flyweight champion August 2, 1986 – February 22, 1987 | Succeeded by Dodie Boy Peñalosa |
