= Kambal Na Kamao: Madugong Engkwentro =

1988 sports film starring Rolando Navarette and Rolando Bohol

- Directed by: Carlo J. Caparas
- Written by: Carlo J. Caparas
- Starring: Rolando Navarette; Rolando Bohol; Mia Pratts; Ana Abiera
- Cinematography: Ramon Marcelino
- Edited by: Rene Tala
- Music by: Demet Velasquez
- Production company: Golden Lion Films
- Release date: June 30, 1988
- Country: Philippines
- Language: Filipino

Kambal Na Kamao: Madugong Engkwentro (lit. 'Twin Fists: Bloody Encounter') is a 1988 Filipino sports film written and directed by comic book writer Carlo J. Caparas. It stars boxing champions Rolando Navarette and Rolando Bohol as two provincial streetfighters who became professional boxers. The film was produced and released by Golden Lion Films in mid-1988. It was given a negative review by film critic Lav Diaz for its uneven and forced storytelling.

== Cast ==
- Rolando Navarette
- Rolando Bohol
- Mia Pratts
- Ana Abiera
- Deborah Sun
- Ruel Vernal
- Rudy Meyer
- Bomber Moran
- Renato del Prado
- Rocco Montalban
- Robert Miller
- Tsing Tong Tsai
- Danny Riel
- Bebing Amora
- Ernie David
- Usman Hasim
- Danny Labra

Introducing

- Twinky and Twinkle the cutest twins
- Gabriel Bebot Elorde Jr.
- Johnny Elorde
- Momong Manaay

== Production ==
According to Rolando Bohol, it was during his first IBF world title defense at the Araneta Coliseum on May 6, 1988 that he and Rolando Navarette, both of whom won their respective bouts that day, were approached by Carlo J. Caparas and Donna Villa of Golden Lion Films for their latest film production Kambal Na Kamao.

== Critical response ==
Lav Diaz, writing for the Manila Standard, gave a negative review of Kambal Na Kamao, writing that the film is a "patchwork of laughs, action, anguished sighs, tragedy, forced scenes and poorly thought-out dialogue", although he mentioned that the boxing scenes are good.
