= Kwon Soon-chun =

South Korea boxer (born 1959)

Personal information
- Nationality: South Korean
- Born: Kwon Soon-chun; April 24, 1959 (age 67) Seoul, South Korea
- Weight: Flyweight; Super flyweight

Boxing career
- Stance: Southpaw

Boxing record
- Total fights: 35
- Wins: 27
- Win by KO: 18
- Losses: 5
- Draws: 3

Kwon Soon-chun (born April 24, 1959 in South Korea ) is a retired South Korean boxer.

== Professional career ==
After turning professional in 1977 he had compiled a record of 21-2-1 in 6 years before unsuccessfully challenging for the WBA super flyweight championship against Jiro Watanabe in 1983. He fought Rene Busayong for the vacant IBF world title and won by 5th-round knockout. After a successful six title defenses he ended up losing the title to Chung Jong-kwan in 1985.

== Professional boxing record ==
35 fights	27 wins	5 losses
By knockout	18	1
By decision	9	3
By disqualification	0	1
Draws	3	

No.	Result	Record	Opponent	Type	Round	Date	Age	Location	Notes
35	Loss	27–5–3	Chang Tae-il	SD	15	May 17, 1987	27 years, 327 days	Kudok Gymnasium, Busan, South Korea	For vacant IBF super flyweight title
34	Win	27–4–3	Little Holmes	KO	3 (10)	Dec 3, 1986	27 years, 223 days	Bung Karno Stadium, Jakarta, Indonesia	
33	Loss	26–4–3	Chung Jong-kwan	TKO	4 (15)	Dec 20, 1985	26 years, 240 days	Kudok Gymnasium, Busan, South Korea	Lost IBF flyweight title
32	Draw	26–3–3	Chung Jong-kwan	SD	15	Jul 17, 1985	26 years, 84 days	Masan Gymnasium, Masan, South Korea	Retained IBF flyweight title
31	Win	26–3–2	Shinobu Kawashima	KO	3 (15)	Apr 15, 1985	25 years, 356 days	Pohang Indoor Gymnasium, Pohang, South Korea	Retained IBF flyweight title
30	Draw	25–3–2	Chung Jong-kwan	SD	15	Jan 25, 1985	25 years, 276 days	Chungmu Gymnasium, Daejeon, South Korea	Retained IBF flyweight title
29	Win	25–3–1	Joaquin Flores Caraballo	TKO	12 (15)	Sep 7, 1984	25 years, 136 days	Chungju, South Korea	Retained IBF flyweight title
28	Win	24–3–1	Ian Clyde	UD	15	May 19, 1984	25 years, 25 days	Daejeon, South Korea	Retained IBF flyweight title
27	Win	23–3–1	Roger Castillo	TD	12 (15)	Feb 25, 1984	24 years, 307 days	Seoul, South Korea	Retained IBF flyweight title
26	Win	22–3–1	Rene Busayong	KO	5 (15)	Dec 24, 1983	24 years, 244 days	Seoul, South Korea	Won inaugural IBF flyweight title
25	Loss	21–3–1	Jiro Watanabe	TD	11 (15)	Oct 6, 1983	24 years, 165 days	Prefectural Gymnasium, Osaka, Osaka, Japan	For WBA super flyweight title
24	Win	21–2–1	Ruben De La Cruz	KO	4 (10)	Jul 24, 1983	24 years, 91 days	Gwangju City, South Korea	
23	Win	20–2–1	Pat Bracero	KO	2 (12)	May 14, 1983	24 years, 20 days	Busan, South Korea	Retained OPBF super flyweight title
22	Win	19–2–1	Rene Aroy	KO	9 (10)	Mar 12, 1983	23 years, 322 days	Masan, South Korea	
21	Win	18–2–1	Phaktai Lipovitan	KO	1 (12)	Jan 2, 1983	23 years, 253 days	Chungmu Gymnasium, Daejeon, South Korea	Retained OPBF super flyweight title
20	Win	17–2–1	Flash Jagdon	KO	1 (?)	Oct 30, 1982	23 years, 189 days	Daegu, South Korea	
19	Win	16–2–1	Joe Hiyas	TD	7 (12)	Sep 19, 1982	23 years, 148 days	Kudok Gymnasium, Busan, South Korea	Retained OPBF super flyweight title
18	Win	15–2–1	Elid Fernandez	TKO	3 (10)	Jun 20, 1982	23 years, 57 days	Indoor Gymnasium, Gwangju City, South Korea	
17	Win	14–2–1	Payao Poontarat	PTS	12	May 7, 1982	23 years, 13 days	Changchung Gymnasium, Seoul, South Korea	Retained OPBF super flyweight title
16	Win	13–2–1	Ali Formentera	TKO	6 (12)	Mar 7, 1982	22 years, 317 days	Daegu Gymnasium, Daegu, South Korea	Retained OPBF super flyweight title
15	Win	12–2–1	Diego De Villa	KO	7 (10)	Jan 3, 1982	22 years, 254 days	Busan, South Korea	
14	Win	11–2–1	Hiroyuki Kobayashi	PTS	10	Dec 6, 1981	22 years, 226 days	Gwangju Gymnasium, Gwangju City, South Korea	
13	Win	10–2–1	William Develos	PTS	12	Oct 17, 1981	22 years, 176 days	Seoul, South Korea	Won OPBF super flyweight title
12	Draw	9–2–1	Lord Esmero	PTS	10	Jul 31, 1981	22 years, 98 days	Gudeok Gymnasium, Busan, South Korea	
11	Win	9–2	Frankie Granados	KO	1 (10)	Jun 27, 1981	22 years, 64 days	Kudok Gymnasium, Busan, South Korea	
10	Loss	8–2	Yoshiyuki Uchikoshi	DQ	1 (6)	Apr 19, 1981	21 years, 360 days	Munhwa Gymnasium, Seoul, South Korea	
9	Win	8–1	Tsuguyuki Toma	KO	2 (10)	Apr 4, 1981	21 years, 345 days	Wonju Gymnasium, Wonju, South Korea	
8	Win	7–1	Jin Hyun Jo	KO	2 (8)	Feb 4, 1981	21 years, 286 days	Jangchung Gymnasium, Seoul, South Korea	
7	Win	6–1	Suk Lim Lee	KO	2 (6)	Dec 7, 1980	21 years, 227 days	Munhwa Gymnasium, Seoul, South Korea	
6	Win	5–1	Chan Soo Jung	PTS	4	Nov 30, 1980	21 years, 220 days	Munhwa Gymnasium, Seoul, South Korea	
5	Win	4–1	Sang Moon Lee	PTS	4	Nov 23, 1980	21 years, 213 days	Munhwa Gymnasium, Seoul, South Korea	
4	Win	3–1	Chun Jae Lee	KO	4 (4)	Nov 19, 1980	21 years, 209 days	Munhwa Gymnasium, Seoul, South Korea	
3	Win	2–1	Young Bum Song	PTS	4	Nov 18, 1980	21 years, 208 days	Munhwa Gymnasium, Seoul, South Korea	
2	Loss	1–1	Jung Keun Choi	PTS	4	Aug 11, 1979	20 years, 109 days	Munhwa Gymnasium, Seoul, South Korea	
1	Win	1–0	Sung Koo Lee	KO	2 (4)	Oct 16, 1977	18 years, 175 days	Seoul, South Korea	

== See also ==
- List of flyweight boxing champions

Achievements
Inaugural Champion	IBF flyweight champion December 24, 1983 – December 20, 1985	Succeeded by Chung Jong-kwan
