= Satoshi Shingaki =

Japanese boxer

Personal information
- Nationality: Japanese
- Born: Satoshi Shingaki; February 21, 1964 (age 62) Itoman, Okinawa Island, USCAR (nowadays Itoman, Okinawa Prefecture, Japan)
- Weight: Bantamweight

Boxing career
- Stance: Southpaw

Boxing record
- Total fights: 15
- Wins: 11
- Win by KO: 8
- Losses: 3
- Draws: 1

Satoshi Shingaki (新垣諭, Shingaki Satoshi; born February 21, 1964) is a Japanese former professional boxer. He held the IBF bantamweight title from 1984 to 1985 as the inaugural champion.

== Career history ==
After being unbeaten in 5 bouts (4 wins and a draw), Shingaki challenged Dodie Boy Peñalosa for the vacant IBF light flyweight title on December 10, 1983. Unfortunately for him, he was knocked out in 12 rounds and met his first setback.

Following a win since losing to Penalosa, Shingaki got another world title shot on April 15, 1984. There, he fought Elmer Magallano for the vacant IBF bantamweight championship and won by TKO in the 8th round. He defended it against Joves De La Puz, three months and twenty days later.

On his second defense, Shingaki fought Australia's Jeff Fenech on 26 April 1985 at the Hordern Pavilion in Sydney. The Japanese champion lost title as he was stopped in the 9th round. They met again on August 23 in the same year at the State Sports Centre, again in Sydney where once more, Shingaki was beaten, this time in 3 rounds. Fenech connected with a hard right 30 seconds into the first which had blood coming from Shingaki's nose. In the 2nd Fenech again connected and opened up a bad cut above his opponents right eye. In true Japanese tradition Shingaki never gave up but the fight was stopped after 3 rounds after he was ruled unfit to continue. Shingaki, despite his injury was keen to continue, even shaping up showing he was willing to go on, but the doctor and referee wouldn't budge and the fight was over.

He won his last 3 matches and quit boxing permanently.

== Professional boxing record ==
15 fights	11 wins	3 losses
By knockout	8	3
By decision	3	0
Draws	1	

No.	Result	Record	Opponent	Type	Round, time	Date	Age	Location	Notes
15	Win	11–3–1	Romeo Opriasa	UD	12	Jan 30, 1990	25 years, 363 days	Osaka, Japan	Won vacant IBF inter-continental super flyweight title
14	Win	10–3–1	Daniel Quililan	KO	2 (?)	Jul 10, 1987	23 years, 159 days	Osaka, Japan	
13	Win	9–3–1	Shinobu Kawashima	KO	5 (10)	Oct 27, 1986	22 years, 268 days	Beijing, China	
12	Loss	8–3–1	Jeff Fenech	TKO	4 (15)	Aug 23, 1986	22 years, 203 days	State Sports Centre, Sydney, New South Wales, Australia	For IBF bantamweight title
11	Loss	8–2–1	Jeff Fenech	TKO	9 (15), 2:43	Apr 26, 1985	21 years, 84 days	Hordern Pavilion, Sydney, New South Wales, Australia	Lost IBF bantamweight title
10	Win	8–1–1	Joves De La Puz	SD	15	Aug 4, 1984	20 years, 185 days	Onoyama Gym, Naha, Okinawa, Japan	Retained IBF bantamweight title
9	Win	7–1–1	Fel Aporto	KO	7 (10), 2:18	Jun 20, 1984	20 years, 140 days	Tsurumai City Hall, Nagoya, Aichi, Japan	
8	Win	6–1–1	Elmer Magallano	TKO	8 (15)	Apr 15, 1984	20 years, 74 days	Kashiwara Gymnasium, Nara, Nara, Japan	Won inaugural IBF bantamweight title
7	Win	5–1–1	Rolando Navarro	TKO	3 (?)	Feb 21, 1984	20 years, 20 days	Marcos Stadium, Pasig City, Metro Manila, Philippines	
6	Loss	4–1–1	Dodie Boy Peñalosa	TKO	12 (15)	Dec 10, 1983	19 years, 312 days	Osaka-Jo Hall, Osaka, Osaka, Japan	For inaugural IBF light flyweight title
5	Draw	4–0–1	Yong Hyun Kim	PTS	10	May 25, 1983	19 years, 113 days	City Gymnasium, Kashiwara, Nara, Japan	
4	Win	4–0	Oscar Gonzales	TKO	4 (?)	Apr 18, 1983	19 years, 76 days	Osaka, Osaka, Japan	
3	Win	3–0	Lito Estimada	KO	3 (?)	Mar 9, 1983	19 years, 36 days	Kashiwara Gymnasium, Nara, Nara, Japan	
2	Win	2–0	Junji Shimada	PTS	6	Jan 12, 1983	18 years, 345 days	Kashihara, Nara, Japan	
1	Win	1–0	Hiroyuki Aikata	KO	2 (?)	Oct 4, 1982	18 years, 245 days	Osaka, Japan	

== See also ==
- List of bantamweight boxing champions
- List of IBF world champions
- List of Japanese boxing world champions
- Boxing in Japan

Achievements
Preceded by Inaugural champion	IBF Bantamweight Champion; April 15, 1984–April 26, 1985	Succeeded by Jeff Fenech
