= Choi Jum-hwan =

South Korean boxer (born 1963)

Personal information
- Born: Choi Jum-hwan; June 9, 1967 (age 59) South Korea
- Weight: Mini-flyweight; Light-flyweight

Boxing career
- Stance: Orthodox

Boxing record
- Total fights: 23
- Wins: 20
- Win by KO: 8
- Losses: 3

Jum Hwan Choi (born June 9, 1963) is a South Korean former professional boxer who competed from 1983 to 1990. He is a world champion in two weight classes, having held the International Boxing Federation (IBF) light-flyweight title from 1986 to 1988 and the World Boxing Council (WBC) strawweight title from 1989 to 1990.

== Professional career ==
Choi turned professional in 1983 and in 1986 captured the vacant IBF light-flyweight title with a decision win over Park Cho-woon. He defended the belt three times before losing it to Tacy Macalos in a rematch in 1988. He moved down in weight to beat Napa Kiatwanchai for the WBC strawweight title the following year, but he lost the belt in his first defense to Hideyuki Ohashi by knockout and retired after the loss.

== Professional boxing record ==
23 fights	20 wins	3 losses
By knockout	8	1
By decision	12	2

No.	Result	Record	Opponent	Type	Round	Date	Location	Notes
23	Loss	20–3	Hideyuki Ohashi	KO	9 (12), 2:11	Feb 7, 1990	Korakuen Hall, Tokyo, Japan	Lost WBC strawweight title
22	Win	20–2	Napa Kiatwanchai	TKO	12 (12), 1:18	Nov 12, 1989	World Trade Center, Seoul, South Korea	Won WBC strawweight title
21	Loss	19–2	Tacy Macalos	UD	12	Nov 5, 1988	Araneta Coliseum, Quezon City, Philippines	Lost IBF light-flyweight title
20	Win	19–2	Rolando Pascua	SD	10	Jan 28, 1988	Seoul, South Korea	
19	Win	18–1	Azadin Anhar	TKO	3 (15), 1:03	Aug 9, 1987	Senayan Hall, Jakarta, Indonesia	Retained IBF light-flyweight title
18	Win	17–1	Toshihiko Matsuda	TKO	4 (15), 1:01	Jul 5, 1987	Palpal Gymnasium, Seoul, South Korea	Retained IBF light-flyweight title
17	Win	16–1	Tacy Macalos	SD	15	Mar 29, 1987	Boxing Gymnasium, Suwon, South Korea	Retained IBF light-flyweight title
16	Win	15–1	Park Cho-Woon	UD	15	Dec 7, 1986	Pohang, South Korea	Won vacant IBF light-flyweight title
15	Win	14–1	Choi Young-Il	PTS	10	Feb 23, 1986	Munhwa Gymnasium, Seoul, South Korea	
14	Win	13–1	Chang Kyung-Jae	PTS	10	Mar 30, 1985	Suwon Gymnasium, Suwon, South Korea	
13	Loss	12–1	Dodie Boy Peñalosa	UD	15	Nov 16, 1984	Araneta Coliseum, Quezon City, Philippines	For IBF light-flyweight title
12	Win	12–0	Chang Kyung-Jae	PTS	10	Jul 15, 1984	Pohang, South Korea	
11	Win	11–0	Kim Jung-Hyun	KO	2 (10), 2:29	May 13, 1984	Munhwa Gymnasium, Seoul, South Korea	Won South Korean light-flyweight title
10	Win	10–0	Lim Ha-Shik	TKO	7 (10), 3:00	Dec 25, 1983	Seoul, South Korea	
9	Win	9–0	Jang Chang-Young	PTS	10	Oct 23, 1983	Munhwa Gymnasium, Seoul, South Korea	
8	Win	8–0	Jun Sung-Kwan	PTS	8	Aug 14, 1983	Munhwa Gymnasium, Seoul, South Korea	
7	Win	7–0	Lim Ha-Shik	PTS	8	Jul 10, 1983	Seoul, South Korea	
6	Win	6–0	Yuh Byung-Dae	KO	1 (8), 1:04	Apr 12, 1983	Seoul, South Korea	
5	Win	5–0	Choi Keung-Soo	PTS	6	May 29, 1983	Munhwa Gymnasium, Seoul, South Korea	
4	Win	4–0	Jung Won-Soo	PTS	6	May 8, 1983	Munhwa Gymnasium, Seoul, South Korea	
3	Win	3–0	Kim Yong-Soo	KO	3 (6), 0:30	Apr 17, 1983	Munhwa Gymnasium, Seoul, South Korea	
2	Win	2–0	Kim Sung-Kyu	PTS	6	Apr 3, 1983	Munhwa Gymnasium, Seoul, South Korea	
1	Win	1–0	Kim Jong-Don	KO	2 (6), 2:25	Mar 13, 1983	Seoul, South Korea	

== Titles in boxing ==
=== Major world titles ===
- WBC strawweight champion (105 lbs)
- IBF light-flyweight champion (108 lbs)

=== Regional/International titles ===
- South Korean light-flyweight champion (108 lbs)

== See also ==
- List of IBF world champions
- List of WBC world champions

Sporting positions
World boxing titles
Vacant Title last held by Dodie Boy Peñalosa	IBF light-flyweight champion December 7, 1986 – November 4, 1988	Succeeded by Tacy Macalos
Preceded by Napa Kiatwanchai	WBC strawweight champion November 12, 1989 – February 7, 1990	Succeeded by Hideyuki Ohashi
