= Kamel Bou Ali =

Tunisian boxer

Personal information
- Nationality: Tunisian
- Born: December 6, 1958 (age 67) Tunis, Tunisia
- Height: 5 ft 6 in (168 cm)
- Weight: Super featherweight

Boxing career
- Stance: Orthodox

Boxing record
- Total fights: 43
- Wins: 37
- Win by KO: 15
- Losses: 6

Kamel Bou Ali (born December 6, 1958), is a Tunisian former professional boxer who competed from 1977 to 1993. He held the WBO super featherweight title from 1989 to 1992.

== Professional career ==
Ali turned professional in 1977 & go on to face & beat future world champion Alfredo Layne in 1984. In his next fight he would unsuccessfully challenge world champion Rocky Lockridge, for his WBA super featherweight world title. Ali would eventually go on to win a world title in his second attempt five years later by beating Antonio Rivera for the vacant WBO super featherweight world title.

== Professional boxing record ==
54 fights	45 wins	5 losses
By knockout	31	2
By decision	9	3
By disqualification	5	0
Draws	3	
No contests	1	

No.	Result	Record	Opponent	Type	Round, time	Date	Location	Notes
54	Loss	45–5–3 (1)	Jan Piet Bergman	TKO	7 (12)	1993-10-06	Carousel Casino, Hammanskraal, South Africa	For WBC International super lightweight title
53	Win	45–4–3 (1)	Antonio Rutledge	TKO	1 (8)	1993-05-15	Alfortville, France	
52	Draw	44–4–3 (1)	Jacobin Yoma	MD	8 (8)	1993-02-06	Cirque d'hiver, Paris, France	
51	Win	44–4–2 (1)	Rosenberg Quimbayo	TKO	6 (?)	1992-10-30	Cassino, Italy	
50	Win	43–4–2 (1)	Jorge Alberto Pompe	PTS	6 (6)	1992-06-17	Salice Terme, Italy	
49	Loss	42–4–2 (1)	Daniel Londas	SD	12 (12)	1992-03-21	Stadio San Rufo, San Rufo, Italy	Lost WBO super featherweight title
48	Win	42–3–2 (1)	Benito Martinez	PTS	8 (8)	1991-11-21	Palazzo Dello Sport, Perugia, Italy	
47	Win	41–3–2 (1)	Joey Jacobs	TKO	3 (12)	1991-06-01	Palazzo Dello Sport, Ragusa, Italy	Retained WBO super featherweight title
46	Win	40–3–2 (1)	Sylvester Kennon	TKO	1 (?)	1991-01-26	Palazzo Dello Sport, Sassari, Italy	
45	NC	39–3–2 (1)	Pedro Villegas	NC	2 (12)	1990-10-20	Palazzo Dello Sport, Cesena, Italy	Retained WBO super featherweight title
44	Draw	39–3–2	Pedro Villegas	PTS	10 (10)	1990-09-22	Pinerolo, Italy	
43	Win	39–3–1	Antonio Rivera	KO	8 (12)	1989-12-09	Teramo, Italy	Won vacant WBO super featherweight title
42	Win	38–3–1	Mwilambwe Tshikala	TKO	5 (?)	1989-11-06	Rozzano, Italy	
41	Win	37–3–1	Carlos Morales	KO	4 (?)	1989-07-28	Germignaga, Italy	
40	Win	36–3–1	Manuel Alberto Billalba	PTS	12 (12)	1989-04-14	Cagliari, Italy	Retained WBC International super featherweight title
39	Win	35–3–1	Jose Luis Cruz	KO	2 (?)	1989-02-18	Pieve Emanuele, Italy	
38	Win	34–3–1	Jesus Quinones	TKO	2 (?)	1988-11-22	Milan, Italy	
37	Win	33–3–1	Robert Dickie	TKO	6 (12)	1988-08-31	Kings Hall, Stoke-on-Trent, England, U.K.	Won WBC International super featherweight title
36	Win	32–3–1	Jose Mosqueda	DQ	3 (?)	1988-04-22	Palatrussardi, Milan, Italy	
35	Win	31–3–1	Rafael Gandarilla	PTS	8 (8)	1988-04-10	Iglesias, Italy	
34	Win	30–3–1	Julio Cesar Gonzalez	KO	1 (10)	1988-02-27	Roberto Clemente Coliseum, San Juan, Puerto Rico	
33	Win	29–3–1	Gil Maldonado	TKO	3 (?)	1987-12-11	Livorno, Italy	
32	Win	28–3–1	Luis Rodriguez	KO	2 (?)	1987-11-28	Oristano, Italy	
31	Win	27–3–1	Richard Fowler	TKO	2 (?)	1987-09-25	Quartu Sant'Elena, Italy	
30	Win	26–3–1	Troy Davis	TKO	1 (?)	1987-07-24	Silvi, Italy	
29	Win	25–3–1	Jose Vasquez	TKO	4 (?)	1987-05-22	Jesi, Italy	
28	Win	24–3–1	Ray Doughty	TKO	6 (?)	1987-04-11	Palazzetto dello Sport, Bologna, Italy	
27	Win	23–3–1	Idabeth Rojas	TKO	2 (?)	1987-03-13	Forli, Italy	
26	Win	22–3–1	Kamel Djadda	PTS	8 (8)	1986-12-30	Guspini, Italy	
25	Win	21–3–1	Sam Johnson	DQ	3 (?)	1986-12-19	Ancona, Italy	
24	Win	20–3–1	Carlos Miguel	KO	3 (?)	1986-11-28	Abano Terme, Italy	
23	Win	19–3–1	Paul Graham	KO	6 (?)	1986-03-01	Tunis, Tunisia	
22	Win	18–3–1	Trevor Evelyn	TKO	5 (?)	1985-12-13	Palazzo Dello Sport, Cesena, Italy	
21	Loss	17–3–1	Rocky Lockridge	TKO	6 (15)	1985-01-27	Palazzo del Congress, Riva del Garda, Italy	For WBA super featherweight title
20	Win	17–2–1	Alfredo Layne	TKO	6 (?)	1984-11-17	Riva del Garda, Italy	
19	Win	16–2–1	Victor Acosta	PTS	10 (10)	1984-09-05	Tunis, Tunisia	
18	Win	15–2–1	Roberto Castanon	TKO	2 (10)	1984-07-29	Castello Sforzesco, Milan, Italy	
17	Win	14–2–1	Angel Mendiola	DQ	4 (10)	1984-06-12	Sullivan Arena, Anchorage, Alaska, U.S.	
16	Win	13–2–1	Hector Cortez	DQ	10 (?)	1984-04-13	Milan, Italy	
15	Win	12–2–1	Robert Mullins	KO	2 (?)	1984-03-17	Tunis, Tunisia	
14	Win	11–2–1	Roberto Pineiro	TKO	6 (?)	1984-02-22	Palasport di San Siro, Milan, Italy	
13	Win	10–2–1	Marcial Santiago	PTS	8 (8)	1984-01-13	Riva del Garda, Italy	
12	Win	9–2–1	Isidoro Cabeza	PTS	10 (10)	1983-11-03	Tunis, Tunisia	
11	Win	8–2–1	Samuel Meck	TKO	6 (?)	1983-03-17	Capo d'Orlando, Italy	
10	Win	7–2–1	Simadilu Lubaki	TKO	3 (?)	1982-10-09	Rimini, Italy	
9	Win	6–2–1	Joaquin Garcia del Moral	DQ	5 (?)	1982-08-04	Rimini, Italy	
8	Win	5–2–1	Richard Saka	RTD	1 (?)	1982-06-02	Chianciano, Italy	
7	Win	4–2–1	Hugo Carrizo	TKO	1 (?)	1982-05-07	Bologna, Italy	
6	Loss	3–2–1	Angelo Bizzarro	PTS	6 (6)	1982-04-08	Faenza, Italy	
5	Loss	3–1–1	Juan Carlos Alvarez	PTS	8 (8)	1981-07-22	Marsala, Italy	
4	Win	3–0–1	Michele Siracusa	TKO	5 (?)	1981-03-09	Roma, Italy	
3	Draw	2–0–1	Pasquale Mazza	PTS	6 (6)	1981-02-23	Roma, Italy	
2	Win	2–0	Daniel Passeyrand	TKO	3 (?)	1979-07-13	Valence, France	
1	Win	1–0	Angelo Emili	PTS	4 (4)	1977-12-15	Bologna, Italy	

== See also ==
- List of world super-featherweight boxing champions

Sporting positions
World boxing titles
Vacant Title last held by John John Molina	WBO super featherweight champion December 9, 1989 – March 21, 1992	Succeeded by Daniel Londas
