= Tacy Macalos =

Filipino boxer

Personal information
- Nationality: Filipino
- Born: Epitacio Agapay; October 28, 1965 (age 60) Padre Burgos, Philippines
- Height: 5 ft 4 in (163 cm)
- Weight: Light flyweight

Boxing career
- Stance: Orthodox

Boxing record
- Total fights: 44
- Wins: 29
- Win by KO: 12
- Losses: 12
- Draws: 3

Epitacio Agapay (born October 28, 1965), better known as Tacy Macalos, is a Filipino former professional boxer who competed from 1984 to 1994. He won the International Boxing Federation (IBF) Light flyweight title in 1988.

== Professional career ==
Macalos turned professional in 1984 and compiled a record of 23–4–3 before defeating Choi Jum-hwan to win the IBF Light flyweight title. He lost the title in his first defense against Muangchai Kittikasem.

== Professional boxing record ==
44 fights	29 wins	12 losses
By knockout	12	5
By decision	17	7
Draws	3	

No.	Result	Record	Opponent	Type	Round, time	Date	Location	Notes
44	Loss	29–12–3	Puma Toguchi	KO	3 (10)	1994-04-18	Japan	
43	Loss	29–11–3	Cho In-joo	PTS	10 (10)	1994-01-30	Daegu, South Korea	
42	Loss	29–10–3	Daorung Chuvatana	KO	8 (10)	1993-11-14	Bangkok, Thailand	
41	Loss	29–9–3	Rolando Bohol	UD	10 (10)	1993-09-25	Cuneta Astrodome, Pasay City, Philippines	
40	Win	29–8–3	Dodie Boy Peñalosa	TD	6 (10)	1993-02-02	Cuneta Astrodome, Pasay City, Philippines	
39	Win	28–8–3	In Man Chang	TKO	4 (10)	1992-10-30	Ninoy Aquino Stadium, Manila, Philippines	
38	Loss	27–8–3	Torsak Pongsupa	PTS	10 (10)	1992-07-01	Bangkok, Thailand	
37	Win	27–7–3	Primo Erasan	MD	10 (10)	1992-04-25	Quezon City, Philippines	
36	Win	26–7–3	Sammy Ansig	TKO	4 (?)	1992-03-14	Rizal Memorial Coliseum, Manila, Philippines	
35	Loss	25–7–3	Rey Paciones	TKO	4 (10)	1990-06-23	Ninoy Aquino Stadium, Manila, Philippines	
34	Loss	25–6–3	Muangchai Kittikasem	TKO	7 (12)	1989-10-06	Lumpinee Boxing Stadium, Bangkok, Thailand	For IBF Light flyweight title
33	Loss	25–5–3	Muangchai Kittikasem	SD	12 (12)	1989-05-02	Lumpinee Boxing Stadium, Bangkok, Thailand	Lost IBF Light flyweight title
32	Win	25–4–3	Seung Yub Kang	TKO	4 (?)	1989-03-04	Manila, Philippines	
31	Win	24–4–3	Choi Jum-hwan	UD	12 (12)	1988-11-05	Araneta Coliseum, Quezon City, Philippines	Won IBF Light flyweight title
30	Win	23–4–3	Thanjai Donjadee	KO	3 (10)	1988-07-30	Pasig City, Philippines	
29	Win	22–4–3	Rittichai Lukmingkwan	TKO	5 (10)	1988-04-15	Araneta Coliseum, Quezon City, Philippines	
28	Win	21–4–3	Cesar De La Cruz	TKO	5 (?)	1988-03-27	Philippines	
27	Win	20–4–3	Arnulfo Melencion	TKO	2 (10)	1987-12-19	Rizal Memorial Coliseum, Manila, Philippines	
26	Win	19–4–3	Leopard Ari	TKO	3 (?)	1987-09-30	Philippines	
25	Loss	18–4–3	Sonny Vidal	TKO	9 (12)	1987-07-04	Gold City Coliseum, Cagayan de Oro City, Philippines	
24	Loss	18–3–3	Choi Jum-hwan	SD	15 (15)	1987-03-29	Boxing Gymnasium, Suwon, South Korea	For IBF Light flyweight title
23	Win	18–2–3	Ronnie Vallescas	PTS	10 (10)	1987-01-24	Manila, Philippines	
22	Win	17–2–3	Little Baguio	TKO	8 (12)	1986-10-30	Olongapo City, Philippines	
21	Win	16–2–3	Titing Dignos	TKO	4 (10)	1986-07-16	Rizal Memorial Coliseum, Manila, Philippines	
20	Win	15–2–3	Junior Bailon	PTS	10 (10)	1986-05-16	Nepomuceno Coliseum, Angeles City, Philippines	
19	Win	14–2–3	Rolando Protacio	PTS	10 (10)	1986-03-15	General Santos City, Philippines	
18	Win	13–2–3	Ariel Samson	PTS	10 (10)	1985-12-02	Pasay City Sports Complex, Pasay City, Philippines	
17	Win	12–2–3	Lou Marabe Jr	PTS	10 (10)	1985-10-12	Nepomuceno Coliseum, Angeles City, Philippines	
16	Win	11–2–3	Edward Adame	TKO	5 (10)	1985-08-31	Elorde Sports Center, Paranaque City, Philippines	
15	Win	10–2–3	Tito Abella	UD	10 (10)	1985-05-29	Elorde Sports Center, Paranaque City, Philippines	
14	Win	9–2–3	Steve Ponan	PTS	8 (8)	1985-05-12	Barangay Matandang Balara, Quezon City, Philippines	
13	Win	8–2–3	Danny Duran	TKO	6 (8)	1985-03-30	Araneta Coliseum, Quezon City, Philippines	
12	Win	7–2–3	Joel Advincula	UD	8 (8)	1985-01-04	Cavite City, Philippines	
11	Win	6–2–3	Edgar Capino Jr	PTS	8 (8)	1984-11-04	Manila Midtown Ramada Hotel - Malate, Manila, Philippines	
10	Win	5–2–3	Bert Chan	PTS	6 (6)	1984-10-13	Baguio College Foundation Gym, Baguio City, Philippines	
9	Win	4–2–3	Elmer De Galla	PTS	6 (6)	1984-09-21	Muntinlupa City, Philippines	
8	Draw	3–2–3	Jun Altarejos	PTS	6 (6)	1984-09-01	Rizal Memorial Coliseum, Manila, Philippines	
7	Win	3–2–2	Julius Olegario	PTS	4 (4)	1984-07-18	Elorde Sports Center, Paranaque City, Philippines	
6	Loss	2–2–2	John Calanogen	PTS	4 (4)	1984-06-15	Rizal Memorial Coliseum, Manila, Philippines	
5	Win	2–1–2	Sammy Baculong	PTS	4 (4)	1984-05-26	Philippines	
4	Win	1–1–2	Ramon Lupasi	PTS	4 (4)	1984-04-28	Philippines	
3	Draw	0–1–2	Sammy Baculong	PTS	4 (4)	1984-03-24	Baguio College Foundation Gym, Baguio City, Philippines	
2	Draw	0–1–1	Jun Altarejos	PTS	4 (4)	1984-03-07	Elorde Sports Center, Paranaque City, Philippines	
1	Loss	0–1	Ariel Samson	PTS	4 (4)	1984-02-17	L&M Gym, Manila, Philippines	

== Boxing trainer ==
Macalos retired in 1994 and became a boxing trainer.

== See also ==
- List of world light-flyweight boxing champions
- List of Filipino boxing world champions

Sporting positions
World boxing titles
Preceded by Choi Jum-hwan	IBF Light flyweight champion November 5, 1988 – May 2, 1989	Succeeded by Muangchai Kittikasem
