= Dodie Boy Peñalosa =

Filipino boxer

Personal information
- Nickname: Dodie Boy
- Born: Diosdado Jumaran Peñalosa; November 19, 1962 (age 63) San Carlos, Negros Occidental, Philippines
- Height: 5 ft 5 in (165 cm)
- Weight: Light-flyweight; Flyweight; Super-flyweight

Boxing career
- Stance: Southpaw

Boxing record
- Total fights: 42
- Wins: 31
- Win by KO: 13
- Losses: 7
- Draws: 3
- No contests: 1

Diosdado "Dodie Boy" Peñalosa (born November 19, 1962) is a Filipino former professional boxer who competed from 1982 to 1995. He is a world champion in two weight classes, having held the International Boxing Federation (IBF) junior-flyweight title from 1983 to 1986 and the IBF flyweight title in 1987.

== Professional career ==
Peñalosa won the Philippine light flyweight title on November 26, 1982, by a 12th round stoppage against Romy Austria. He defended it against Alfredo Guanzon on January 30, 1983, although the bout ended in a no-contest for unknown reasons.

In 1983, he became the first IBF light flyweight champion with a technical knockout win over Satoshi Shingaki who would later become the inaugural IBF bantamweight champion. He defended the title three times before vacating the belt. In 1986, he moved up to challenge WBA Flyweight Title holder Hilario Zapata but lost.

Peñalosa later captured the IBF Flyweight Title the following year with a knockout win over Hi-Sup Shin. He lost the belt in his first defense to Chang-Ho Choi. In 1989, he would get another shot at the IBF Flyweight Title against Dave McAuley, but lost a split decision. He retired in 1995.

It was revealed that Peñalosa has been suffering from polio since he was born.

== Post-retirement ==
He has since become the trainer of Nonito Donaire after the young boxer had a bitter split with his father.

Together on April 19, 2009, the team defeated Raul Martinez in Donaire's third title defense of his IBF Flyweight championship, a belt he once held in 1987.

== Personal life ==
His younger brother, Gerry Peñalosa, was the WBO bantamweight champion. He has 3 children, including boxers Dodie Boy Peñalosa Jr. and David Penalosa.

== Professional boxing record ==
| 42 fights | 31 wins | 7 losses |
|---|---|---|
| By knockout | 13 | 1 |
| By decision | 17 | 6 |
| By disqualification | 1 | 0 |
| Draws | 3 | |
| No contests | 1 | |

| No. | Result | Record | Opponent | Type | Round, time | Date | Location | Notes |
|---|---|---|---|---|---|---|---|---|
| 42 | NC | 31–7–3 (1) | Puma Toguchi | UD | 10 | Dec 14, 1993 | Korakuen Hall, Japan | No contest after a riot broke out |
| 41 | Loss | 31–7–3 | Puma Toguchi | UD | 10 | Dec 14, 1993 | Korakuen Hall, Japan | |
| 40 | Loss | 31–6–3 | Rolando Pascua | UD | 10 | Jul 17, 1993 | Cuneta Astrodome, Pasay City, Philippines | |
| 39 | Win | 31–5–3 | Chang In-Man | TKO | 6 (10) | Apr 2, 1993 | Almendras Gym, Davao City, Philippines | |
| 38 | Loss | 30–5–3 | Tacy Macalos | TD | 6 (10) | Feb 2, 1993 | Cuneta Astrodome, Pasay City, Philippines | Accidental headbutt in round 6 |
| 37 | Win | 30–4–3 | Suksawat Torboonlert | UD | 10 | Dec 21, 1991 | Rizal Memorial Coliseum, Manila, Philippines | |
| 36 | Loss | 29–4–3 | Rolando Bohol | UD | 10 | Oct 24, 1991 | Araneta Coliseum, Quezon City, Philippines | |
| 35 | Draw | 29–3–3 | Ric Siodora | TD | 6 (10) | Jul 31, 1991 | Araneta Coliseum, Quezon City, Philippines | |
| 34 | Win | 29–3–2 | Manny Melchor | TD | 7 (?) | Apr 25, 1991 | Quezon City, Philippines | |
| 33 | Draw | 28–3–2 | Ric Siodora | TD | 2 (?) | Oct 19, 1990 | Tagum City, Philippines | |
| 32 | Win | 28–3–1 | Den Chuwatana | MD | 10 | Aug 25, 1990 | Cebu Coliseum, Cebu City, Philippines | |
| 31 | Win | 27–3–1 | Par Jong-Kwon | UD | 10 | Mar 31, 1990 | Araneta Coliseum, Quezon City, Philippines | |
| 30 | Win | 26–3–1 | Champ Kiatpetch | TKO | 1 (10) | Dec 22, 1989 | Cebu City, Philippines | |
| 29 | Loss | 25–3–1 | Dave McAuley | SD | 12 | Nov 8, 1989 | Grand Hall, Wembley, London, England, UK | For IBF flyweight title |
| 28 | Win | 25–2–1 | Yossi Amnifu | TKO | 3 (10), 2:10 | Jun 24, 1989 | Rizal Memorial Sports Complex, Manila, Philippines | |
| 27 | Win | 24–2–1 | Chi-Young Ki | DQ | 1 (10) | Apr 29, 1989 | Cebu Coliseum, Cebu City, Philippines | |
| 26 | Win | 23–2–1 | Tongthep Petchsiracha | TKO | 8 (10) | Feb 4, 1989 | Pasay City Sports Complex, Pasay City, Philippines | |
| 25 | Win | 22–2–1 | Jung Bi-won | UD | 10 | Sep 2, 1988 | Araneta Coliseum, Quezon City, Philippines | |
| 24 | Win | 21–2–1 | Kwanjai Sorpengpit | UD | 10 | Apr 15, 1988 | Araneta Coliseum, Quezon City, Philippines | |
| 23 | Loss | 20–2–1 | Choi Chang-ho | KO | 11 (15), 2:07 | Sep 5, 1987 | Araneta Coliseum, Quezon City, Philippines | Lost IBF flyweight title |
| 22 | Win | 20–1–1 | Shin Hi-sup | TKO | 5 (15), 2:10 | Feb 22, 1987 | Indoor Gymnasium, Incheon, South Korea | Won IBF flyweight title |
| 21 | Win | 19–1–1 | Young Il Choi | TKO | 5 (10), 1:29 | Nov 8, 1986 | Manila Midtown Ramada Hotel - Malate, Manila, Philippines | |
| 20 | Loss | 18–1–1 | Hilario Zapata | UD | 15 | Jul 5, 1986 | ULTRA, Pasig City, Philippines | For WBA flyweight title |
| 19 | Win | 18–0–1 | Soon Jung Kang | UD | 10 | Feb 21, 1986 | ULTRA, Pasig City, Philippines | Retained IBF junior-flyweight title |
| 18 | Win | 17–0–1 | Yani Dokolamo | TKO | 3 (15), 2:00 | Oct 12, 1985 | PI Arena, Jakarta, Indonesia | Retained IBF junior-flyweight title |
| 17 | Win | 16–0–1 | Amado Ursua | UD | 10 | Jul 19, 1985 | ULTRA, Pasig City, Philippines | |
| 16 | Win | 15–0–1 | Choi Jum-hwan | UD | 15 | Nov 16, 1984 | Araneta Coliseum, Quezon City, Philippines | Retained IBF junior-flyweight title |
| 15 | Win | 14–0–1 | Jae Hong Kim | TKO | 9 (15), 2:31 | May 13, 1984 | Munhwa Gymnasium, Seoul, South Korea | Retained IBF junior-flyweight title |
| 14 | Win | 13–0–1 | Satoshi Shingaki | TKO | 12 (15) | Dec 10, 1983 | Osaka-Jo Hall, Osaka, Japan | Won inaugural IBF junior-flyweight title |
| 13 | Win | 12–0–1 | Katsumi Sato | UD | 12 | Jun 11, 1983 | Rizal Memorial Sports Complex, Manila, Philippines | Retained OPBF flyweight title |
| 12 | Win | 11–0–1 | Sung Nam Kim | TKO | 11 (12) | Mar 18, 1983 | Araneta Coliseum, Quezon City, Philippines | Won OPBF flyweight title |
| 11 | Draw | 10–0–1 | Alfredo Guanzon | TD | 4 (12) | Jan 30, 1983 | Cebu City, Philippines | Retained GAB flyweight title |
| 10 | Win | 10–0 | Romy Austria | TKO | 12 (12) | Nov 26, 1982 | Araneta Coliseum, Quezon City, Philippines | Won vacant GAB flyweight title |
| 9 | Win | 9–0 | Joswe Agcang | MD | 10 | Sep 10, 1982 | Cebu Coliseum, Cebu City, Philippines | |
| 8 | Win | 8–0 | German Ellana | UD | 10 | Jul 31, 1982 | Cebu City, Philippines | |
| 7 | Win | 7–0 | Rio Gamutan | TKO | 6 (10) | Jun 30, 1982 | Cebu City, Philippines | |
| 6 | Win | 6–0 | Elmer Magallano | UD | 10 | Jun 5, 1982 | Cebu Coliseum, Cebu City, Philippines | |
| 5 | Win | 5–0 | Aurel Sagusay | TKO | 2 (10) | May 19, 1982 | Butuan City, Philippines | |
| 4 | Win | 4–0 | Res Cabuenas | UD | 8 | May 8, 1982 | San Carlos City, Philippines | |
| 3 | Win | 3–0 | Tony Labrador | UD | 8 | Mar 31, 1982 | Ramos-Cogon Basketball Court, Cebu City, Philippines | |
| 2 | Win | 2–0 | Rolando Navares | UD | 6 | Mar 21, 1982 | Cebu City, Philippines | |
| 1 | Win | 1–0 | Roger Pilapil | UD | 6 | Feb 28, 1982 | Barangay Congon Ramos, Cebu City, Philippines | |

== Titles in boxing ==
=== Major world titles ===
- IBF junior-flyweight champion (105 lbs)
- IBF flyweight champion (112 lbs)

=== Regional/International titles ===
- GAB flyweight champion (112 lbs)
- OPBF flyweight champion (112 lbs)

== See also ==
- List of light-flyweight boxing champions
- List of flyweight boxing champions
- List of Filipino boxing world champions

Sporting positions
World boxing titles
| Inaugural Champion | IBF junior-flyweight champion December 10, 1983 – July 18, 1986; Stripped | Vacant Title next held by Choi Jum-hwan |
| Preceded by Shin Hi-sup | IBF flyweight champion February 22, 1987 – September 5, 1987 | Succeeded by Choi Chang-ho |
