= Rolando Bohol =

Filipino boxer

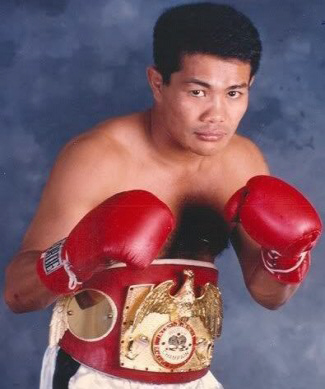

Personal information
- Nationality: Filipino
- Born: December 25, 1965 (age 60) Himamaylan, Negros Occidental, Philippines
- Weight: Flyweight; Super flyweight; Bantamweight

Boxing career
- Stance: Southpaw

Boxing record
- Total fights: 52
- Wins: 34
- Win by KO: 7
- Losses: 15
- Draws: 3

Rolando Bohol (born December 25, 1965) is a Filipino former professional boxer and actor. He competed from 1984 to 1994, holding the IBF flyweight title in 1988, and challenged once for the IBF bantamweight title in 1994.

== Professional career ==
Bohol turned professional in 1984 and got a draw on his first match. After 15 matches (13 wins and 2 draws), Bohol lost to Dadoy Andujar by a 10-round decision on September 29, 1985. His first fight outside home soil took place in Sokcho South Korea against Joon Huh on July 20, 1986.

Eleven bouts later, he won the IBF Flyweight title on January 16, 1988, by defeating Chang Ho Choi in Manila and regained the world title back for the Philippines. Bohol defended the title successfully by defeating Cho-Woon Park by unanimous decision on May 6, 1988. Then, he lost it to Duke McKenzie in London, England on October 5, 1988. In the same year, he starred in the sports drama film Kambal Na Kamao: Madugong Engkwentro directed by Carlo J. Caparas.

Bohol won the OPBF Super Flyweight title against Thailand's Maphai Narachavat by a knock-out in 6 rounds. He successfully defended the title by defeating former International Boxing Federation IBF World Fyweight champion Jong-Kwan Chung on August 4, 1989. In that same year, he lost the title against Tatsuya Sugi. He would later avenge this loss against Sugi via a tenth round knock-out in Honolulu, Hawaii on February 21, 1994.

In late 1990, Bohol was cast in the lead role of Elias for the "Puso ng Basura" episode of the television program 24 Oras. After a major car accident in Honolulu, Hawaii, which propelled Rolando's retirement plans quicker than he expected, Bohol moved to Las Vegas in 2006. Rolando Bohol currently owns an Internet electronics store operating from Las Vegas, Nevada, United States, where he resides.

== Professional boxing record ==
52 fights	34 wins	15 losses
By knockout	7	4
By decision	26	11
By disqualification	1	0
Draws	3	

No.	Result	Record	Opponent	Type	Round, Time	Date	Location	Notes
52	Loss	34–15–3	Johnny Tapia	KO	2 (10), 2:21	8 Dec 1994	Albuquerque Convention Center, Albuquerque, New Mexico, U.S.	
51	Loss	34–14–3	Orlando Canizales	KO	5 (12), 0:57	7 Jun 1994	South Padre Island Convention Centre, South Padre Island, Texas, U.S.	For IBF bantamweight title
50	Win	34–13–3	Simon Contreras	TKO	6 (10)	27 Apr 1994	Sheraton Waikiki Hotel, Honolulu, Hawaii, U.S.	
49	Win	33–13–3	Tatsuya Sugi	RTD	9 (10), 3:00	22 Feb 1994	Neal S. Blaisdell Center, Honolulu, Hawaii, U.S.	
48	Win	32–13–3	Hiroshi Kobayashi	UD	10	16 Dec 1993	Manila Midtown Ramada Hotel - Malate, Manila, Philippines	
47	Loss	31–13–3	Satoshi Iida	UD	10	27 Nov 1993	Nagoya, Aichi, Japan	
46	Win	31–12–3	Tacy Macalos	UD	10	25 Sep 1993	Cuneta Astrodome, Pasay, Philippines	
45	Loss	30–12–3	Ernie Cataluna	UD	10	3 Jul 1993	Korakuen Hall, Tokyo, Japan	
44	Loss	30–11–3	Daorung Chuvatana	UD	10	31 Jan 1993	Bangkok, Thailand	
43	Loss	30–10–3	Gerry Peñalosa	UD	10	19 Dec 1992	SWU Aznar Coliseum, Cebu City, Philippines	
42	Win	30–9–3	Dodie Boy Peñalosa Sr.	UD	10	24 Oct 1992	Araneta Coliseum, Barangay Cubao, Quezon City, Philippines	
41	Loss	29–9–3	Ray Paciones	SD	10	25 Jul 1992	Tagum, Davao del Norte, Philippines	
40	Win	29–8–3	Sergio Pepito	UD	10	14 Mar 1992	Rizal Memorial Sports Complex, Manila, Philippines	
39	Win	28–8–3	Jonathan Albay	MD	10	28 Dec 1991	Elorde Sports Center, Parañaque, Philippines	
38	Loss	27–8–3	Junior Jones	UD	10	24 Oct 1991	DCU Center, Worcester, Massachusetts, U.S.	
37	Loss	27–7–3	Miguel Lora	PTS	10	2 Aug 1991	Coliseo el Campín, Bogotá, Colombia	
36	Loss	27–6–3	Yuri Arbachakov	KO	2 (?)	20 Dec 1990	Korakuen Hall, Tokyo, Japan	
35	Loss	27–5–3	Tatsuya Sugi	SD	12	17 Dec 1989	Kitakyushu, Fukuoka, Japan	Lost OPBF super flyweight title
34	Loss	27–4–3	Jose Valdez	UD	10	18 Oct 1989	Neal S. Blaisdell Center, Honolulu, Hawaii, U.S.	
33	Win	27–3–3	Chung Jong-kwan	MD	12	4 Aug 1989	Ninoy Aquino Stadium, District of Malate, Manila, Philippines	Retained OPBF super flyweight title
32	Win	26–3–3	Maphai Narachawat	TKO	6 (12), 1:45	22 Apr 1989	Ninoy Aquino Stadium, District of Malate, Manila, Philippines	Won vacant OPBF super flyweight title
31	Win	25–3–3	Sakdisamuth Singsamang	KO	2 (10), 0:49	18 Feb 1989	Ninoy Aquino Stadium, District of Malate, Manila, Philippines	
30	Draw	24–3–3	Ari Blanca	TD	2 (10)	23 Dec 1988	Rizal Memorial Coliseum, Manila, Philippines	Fight stopped due to a cut on Blanca's right eyebrow caused by an accidental headbutt
29	Loss	24–3–2	Duke McKenzie	KO	11 (12), 2:25	5 Oct 1988	Grand Hall, Wembley, England	Lost IBF flyweight title
28	Win	24–2–2	Cho Woon Park	UD	15	6 May 1988	Araneta Coliseum, Barangay Cubao, Quezon City, Philippines	Retained IBF flyweight title
27	Win	23–2–2	Choi Chang-ho	SD	15	16 Jan 1988	Rizal Memorial Sports Complex, Manila, Philippines	Won IBF flyweight title
26	Win	22–2–2	Rod Naiconi	UD	10	30 Aug 1987	Elorde Sports Center, Parañaque, Philippines	
25	Win	21–2–2	Ademar Amad	UD	10	16 May 1987	Rizal Memorial Sports Complex, Manila, Philippines	
24	Win	20–2–2	Faustino Simbajon	UD	10	20 Feb 1987	Elorde Sports Center, Parañaque, Philippines	
23	Win	19–2–2	Mannaseh Base	UD	10	15 Nog 1986	Elorde Sports Center, Parañaque, Philippines	
22	Win	18–2–2	Allan Makitoki	UD	10	10 Sep 1986	Elorde Sports Center, Parañaque, Philippines	
21	Loss	17–2–2	Joon Huh	SD	10	20 Jul 1986	Student Gymnasium, Sokcho, South Korea	
20	Win	17–1–2	Rey Cogonon	UD	10	5 Jul 1986	ULTRA Arena, Pasig, Philippines	
19	Win	16–1–2	Ric Santiago	TKO	7 (10)	16 Apr 1986	Elorde Sports Center, Parañaque, Philippines	
18	Win	15–1–2	Titing Dignos	UD	10	5 Mar 1986	Elorde Sports Center, Parañaque, Philippines	
17	Win	14–1–2	Paul Torres	UD	10	30 Oct 1985	Elorde Sports Center, Parañaque, Philippines	
16	Loss	13–1–2	Dadoy Andujar	UD	10	29 Sep 1985	General Santos, Cotabato del Sur, Philippines	
15	Win	13–0–2	Dommy Ursua Jr.	UD	10	3 Jul 1985	Elorde Sports Center, Parañaque, Philippines	
14	Win	12–0–2	Henry Balina	UD	10	19 Apr 1985	Elorde Sports Center, Parañaque, Philippines	
13	Win	11–0–2	Cecilio Tutor	SD	10	6 Mar 1995	Elorde Sports Center, Parañaque, Philippines	
12	Win	10–0–2	John Calanogen	UD	8	16 Jan 1985	Elorde Sports Center, Parañaque, Philippines	
11	Draw	9–0–2	Ric Bajelot	SD	8	14 Nov 1984	Elorde Sports Center, Parañaque, Philippines	
10	Win	9–0–1	Joel Advincula	UD	8	17 Oct 1984	Elorde Sports Center, Parañaque, Philippines	
9	Win	8–0–1	Edgar Capino Jr.	DQ	7 (8)	26 Aug 1984	Elorde Sports Center, Parañaque, Philippines	
8	Win	7–0–1	Jun Villaceran	TKO	2 (6)	1 Aug 1984	Elorde Sports Center, Parañaque, Philippines	
7	Win	6–0–1	John Calanogen	UD	6	11 Jul 1984	Elorde Sports Center, Parañaque, Philippines	
6	Win	5–0–1	Bert Baco	MD	6	30 May 1984	Elorde Sports Center, Parañaque, Philippines	
5	Win	4–0–1	Danny Duran	UD	6	2 May 1984	Elorde Sports Center, Parañaque, Philippines	
4	Win	3–0–1	Ruben Portuguez	UD	4	4 Apr 1984	Elorde Sports Center, Parañaque, Philippines	
3	Win	2–0–1	Moriby Evasco	UD	4	21 Mar 1984	Elorde Sports Center, Parañaque, Philippines	
2	Win	1–0–1	Ely Tabuco Tabuktol	TKO	1 (4)	29 Feb 1984	Elorde Sports Center, Parañaque, Philippines	
1	Draw	0–0–1	Bert Baco	SD	4	18 Jan 1984	Elorde Sports Center, Parañaque, Philippines	
