= Antonio Rivera =

Puerto Rican boxer

José Antonio Rivera (December 5, 1963, in Río Piedras, Puerto Rico– April 4, 2005) was a Puerto Rican boxer. He was much better known as El Gallo Rivera or Tonito Rivera, and was a prominent boxer during the decade of the 1980s.

== Professional career ==
José Antonio Rivera began his professional boxing career on February 26, 1981, after a long and successful amateur boxing career, knocking out Humberto Maldonado in the first round at Trujillo Alto, Puerto Rico. He posted two more wins in a row, one by knockout, then lost for the first time as a professional, beaten by Herminio Adorno by a decision in five rounds on May 22. Rivera avenged that loss with a first-round knockout of Adorno on July 9, in Trujillo Alto.

Rivera won five of his next six bouts before fighting abroad for the first time, losing by a ten-round decision to Enrique Sanchez at Santo Domingo, Dominican Republic, on October 15, 1982. About one year and a half later, Sanchez lost to Alberto Davila for the WBC world Bantamweight title.

On February 12, 1983, Rivera fought for his first championship, the regional, Puerto Rican Super Bantamweight title. He conquered the belt by beating Orlando Perez by a twelve-round decision in Canovanas.

Rivera won his next four fights, including a seventh-round knockout victory over Manuel Santos as part of the Wilfredo Gómez-Eladio Santana fight's undercard at the Roberto Clemente Coliseum on December 14 of that year, and his Madison Square Garden debut, a win over Vincent Christian by a fifth-round knockout on July 26, 1984, at the Garden's Felt Forum Arena.

In his next fight, Rivera defended his Puerto Rican Super Bantamweight title against fellow Puerto Rican Juan Veloz, on September 1 in Carolina. The bout was a long-awaited fight by Puerto Rican fight fans and press alike; ahead on points after ten rounds, Rivera lost the fight by a knockout in round eleven.

On February 2, 1985, Rivera re-established himself as a top ranked boxer when he knocked out Alberto Mercado in seven rounds as part of one of Victor Callejas' title defense undercards. At stake in that bout was a spot among the IBF's top ten challengers. This time, it was Rivera who staged a comeback, being behind on the judges' scorecards before defeating Mercado.

On July 12, he met Tony Miller in Australia, and the two boxers fought to a ten-round draw (tie). On October 5, he beat fringe contender Irving Mitchell in San Juan by a knockout in five rounds to win the WBC continental Americas Featherweight title and position himself as the number one challenger among Featherweights with the IBF.

Rivera next faced a relatively long layoff, while negotiations over contracts for his world title challenge were finalized. Rivera finally got his first shot at becoming world champion on August 30, 1986, in Osan, South Korea, when he faced the IBF world Featherweight champion, Ki-Young Chung. Rivera became world champion by knocking Chung out in ten rounds.

Rivera next faced another long layoff. When his first defense could be finally held. Rivera lost his title when he was knocked out in four rounds by Calvin Grove, on January 23, 1988, in Gamaches, France. Sixteen months passed between the moment that Rivera won the world championship and his first title defense.

Tonito Rivera won his next three bouts before receiving a shot at becoming world champion again. On December 9, 1989, he dropped Kamel Bou Ali, but lost the fight by an eighth-round knockout, in Teramo, Italy. That bout was contested for the WBO's vacant world Jr. Lightweight title.

Rivera, much like Marvin Hagler before him, fell in love with Italy. He lived there for the rest of his life, returning to Puerto Rico multiple times for fights. He lost his next fight after the bout with Bou Ali, but rebounded with four straight wins, including a third-round knockout over future world champion Giovanni Parisi on November 10, 1990, in Monsano.

On September 14, 1991, Rivera challenged Dingaan Thobela for the WBO world Lightweight title, losing a twelve-round decision to Thobela in Johannesburg, South Africa. After winning four more bouts and drawing one, Rivera received another world title shot, this time in a rematch with Parisi, by then the WBO world Lightweight champion, in Rome on September 24, 1993. Rivera was outpointed by Parisi over twelve rounds.

Rivera then embarked on another winning streak, which included a second-round knockout over Argentine hopeful Fabian Tejada on March 6, 1995, in Inglewood, California. That same year, on December 15, he returned to the Madison Square Garden to defeat Gerard Gray by a ninth-round knockout.

Rivera would get another world title chance after that bout: on April 13, 1996, he lost to Artur Grigorian by a knockout in round twelve at Hamburg, Germany, for the WBO's world Lightweight title.

Rivera won one, lost three and drew one of his next five fights. One of those bouts was a first-round knockout loss to fringe contender Shannan Taylor of Australia. He also lost to Diosbelys Hurtado, but, on October 25, 1997, he did draw over ten rounds with former WBO world Jr. Welterweight champion, fellow Puerto Rican Sammy Fuentes.

Soon after defeating Johnny Valentin by a first-round knockout on September 30, 2002, in Hatillo, Puerto Rico, as part of a tournament named the world television Hispanic tournament, Rivera was diagnosed with an undisclosed disease, having to retire from boxing for good.

== Death ==
After a long battle with his disease, he died on April 4, 2005, of an asthma attack. After death, Rivera made Puerto Rican sports history, becoming the first athlete to have his mortal remains exposed at the Puerto Rican Sports Pavilion. The second athlete to have his mortal remains exposed there was Félix Javier Pérez, a basketball player who was murdered later that year while trying to defend a neighbor from robbers.

Antonio Rivera had a professional boxing record of 36 wins, 13 losses and 3 draws, with 32 wins by knockout.

== See also ==
- List of Puerto Rican boxing world champions

Achievements
Preceded by Ki-Young Chung	IBF Featherweight Champion; 30 Aug 1986 – 23 Jan 1988	Succeeded by Calvin Grove
