= Oh Min-keun =

South Korean boxer (born 1962)

Min-Keun Oh
Personal information
- Born: Oh Min-keun; August 15, 1962 (age 63) Seoul, South Korea
- Weight: Featherweight

Boxing career
- Stance: Orthodox

Boxing record
- Total fights: 21
- Wins: 16
- Win by KO: 6
- Losses: 5

Min-Keun Oh (Korean: 오민근; Hanja: 吳民根; born August 15, 1962) is a South Korean former boxer.

== Amateur career ==
In 1979, Oh won the silver medal in featherweight at the inaugural World Junior Amateur Boxing Championships held in Yokohama, Japan.

In 1980, he won another silver at the Asian Amateur Boxing Championships held in Bombay, India, losing a split decision to 1982 World Championship silver medalist Rawsalyn Otgonbayar of Mongolia in the final match.

== Pro career ==
In 1983, he won the Orient and Pacific Boxing Federation featherweight title.

In 1984, Kim became the inaugural IBF featherweight champion with a KO win over Joko Arter of Indonesia. He defended the belt twice, against two Americans. The first defense against Kelvin Lampkin winning a 15-round decision, 6-10-84, and then his second defense against Irving Mitchell by 15-round decision, 4-7-85. before losing it to Ki-Young Chung in 1985.

Achievements
Preceded by Inaugural Champion	IBF Featherweight Champion; 4 March 1984 – 29 November 1985	Succeeded by Ki-Young Chung
