= Choi Chang-ho =

South Korean boxer (born 1964)

Chang-Ho Choi
Personal information
- Nationality: (South Korea) South Korean
- Born: Choi Chang-ho; February 10, 1964 (age 62) Seoul, South Korea
- Height: 5 ft 6 in (1.68 m)
- Weight: Flyweight

Boxing career
- Stance: Orthodox

Boxing record
- Total fights: 20
- Wins: 15
- Win by KO: 12
- Losses: 5

Chang-Ho Choi (Korean: 최창호; Hanja: 崔昌鎬; born February 10, 1964, in Seoul, South Korea) is a former boxer from South Korea.

In 1987, Choi became the IBF Flyweight champion with an 11-round KO win over Dodie Boy Peñalosa in Quezon City, Philippines. However, he lost the belt in his first defense to Rolando Bohol in 1988.

In the same year Choi unsuccessfully challenged Khaosai Galaxy for the WBA Super Flyweight title, losing by TKO at 0:56 of round 8.

Preceded by Dodie Boy Peñalosa	IBF Flyweight Champion; 5 September 1987 – 16 January 1988	Succeeded by Rolando Bohol
