= Chung Ki-young =

South Korean boxer

Ki-Young Chung
Personal information
- Born: 23 November 1959 (age 66) Gyeongsangbuk-do, South Korea
- Weight: Featherweight

Boxing career

Boxing record
- Total fights: 38
- Wins: 31
- Win by KO: 10
- Losses: 5
- Draws: 2

Ki-Young Chung (Korean: 정기영; born November 23, 1959) is a former professional boxer. During his career, which lasted from 1979 to 1986, Chung won the IBF world featherweight title. Before competing at featherweight, Choung won the Super Bantamweight title of South Korea 1982. He also won the Korean title as a featherweight, along with the OPBF title. His first challenge for a world title came on November 29, 1985, against fellow South Korean Min-Keun Oh. Chung won the fight with a technical knockout in the fifteenth round to become champion. He defended his title twice; knocking out Tyrone Jackson and beating Richard Savage with a unanimous decision. Chung lost his title to Antonio Rivera on August 30, 1986. Rivera won the fight with a tenth-round knockout, in what was to be Chung's final professional contest.

Achievements
| Preceded by Min-Keun Oh | IBF Featherweight Champion; 29 November 1985 – 30 August 1986 | Succeeded by Antonio Rivera |
