= Pow Salud =

Filipino sportcaster and Boxing commentator

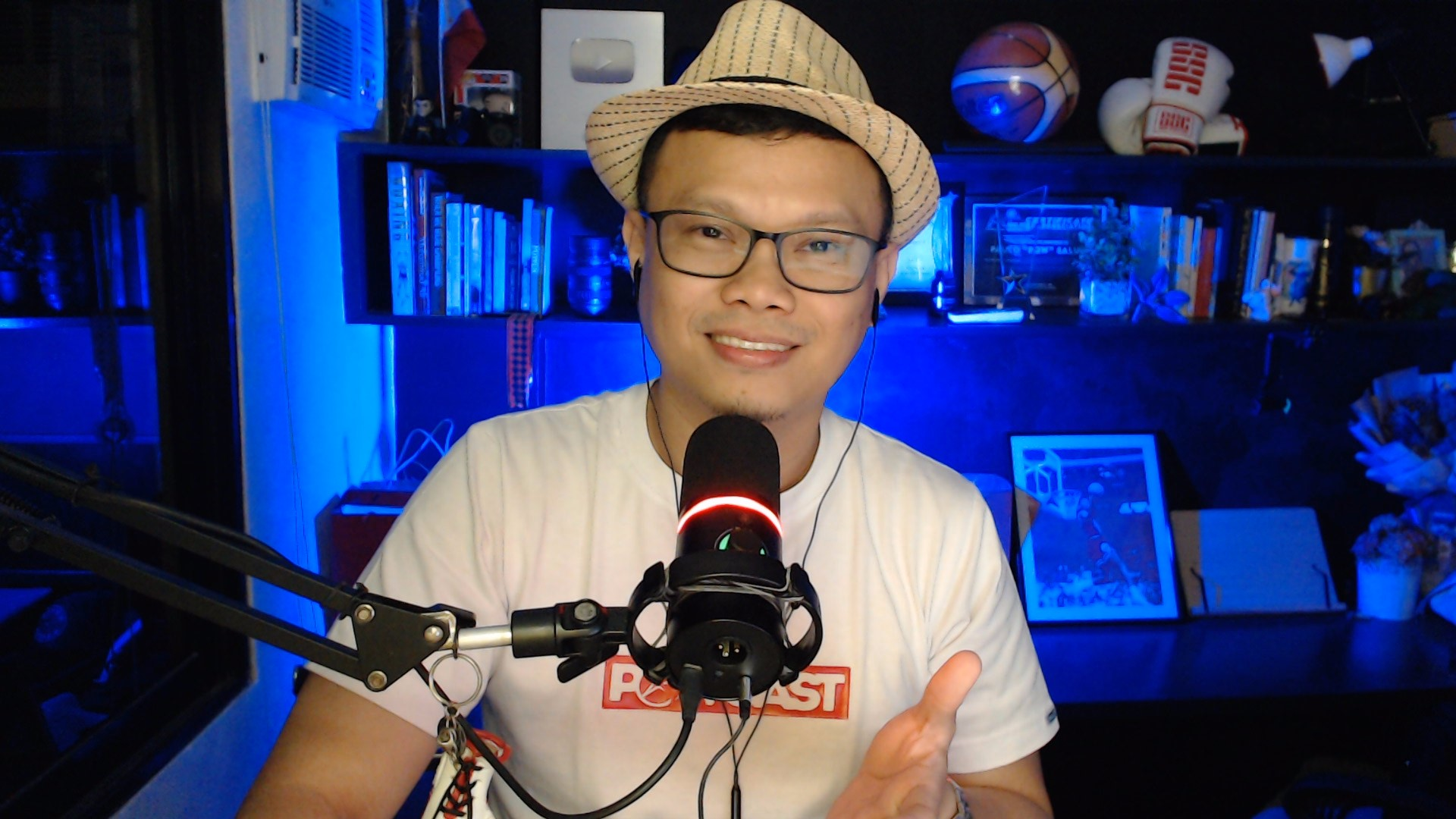
- Salud in 2025
- Born: Paulo G. Salud; February 17, 1981 (age 45); Rosario, Batangas, Philippines
- Other name: Mr. Powcast
- Education: AMA University (B.S. in Computer Science)
- Occupations: Sports commentator; ring announcer; host; boxing analyst; content creator; real estate agent
- Years active: 2010–present
- Sports commentary career
- Genre: Play-by-play
- Sports: Boxing; Basketball; MMA

YouTube information
- Channel: Powcast Sports
- Years active: 2016–present
- Genres: Sports, entertainment, commentary, public service
- Subscribers: 652 thousand
- Views: 216 million
- Last updated: November 2, 2026
- Website: powcast.net powsalud.com

Paulo G. Salud (born 17 February 1981), also known as Pow Salud, is a Filipino sports commentator, ring announcer, and social media influencer. He is prominent figure in the modern Philippine sports media scene, particularly in boxing as the founder of the sports platform, Powcast Sports. He is also in collaboration with the Games and Amusements Board in various boxing events. He is also part of the PTV Sports show and reporter at Philstar since 2025. Salud is also a real-estate agent associated with Realty One Group in Taguig, Philippines.

== Early life and career ==
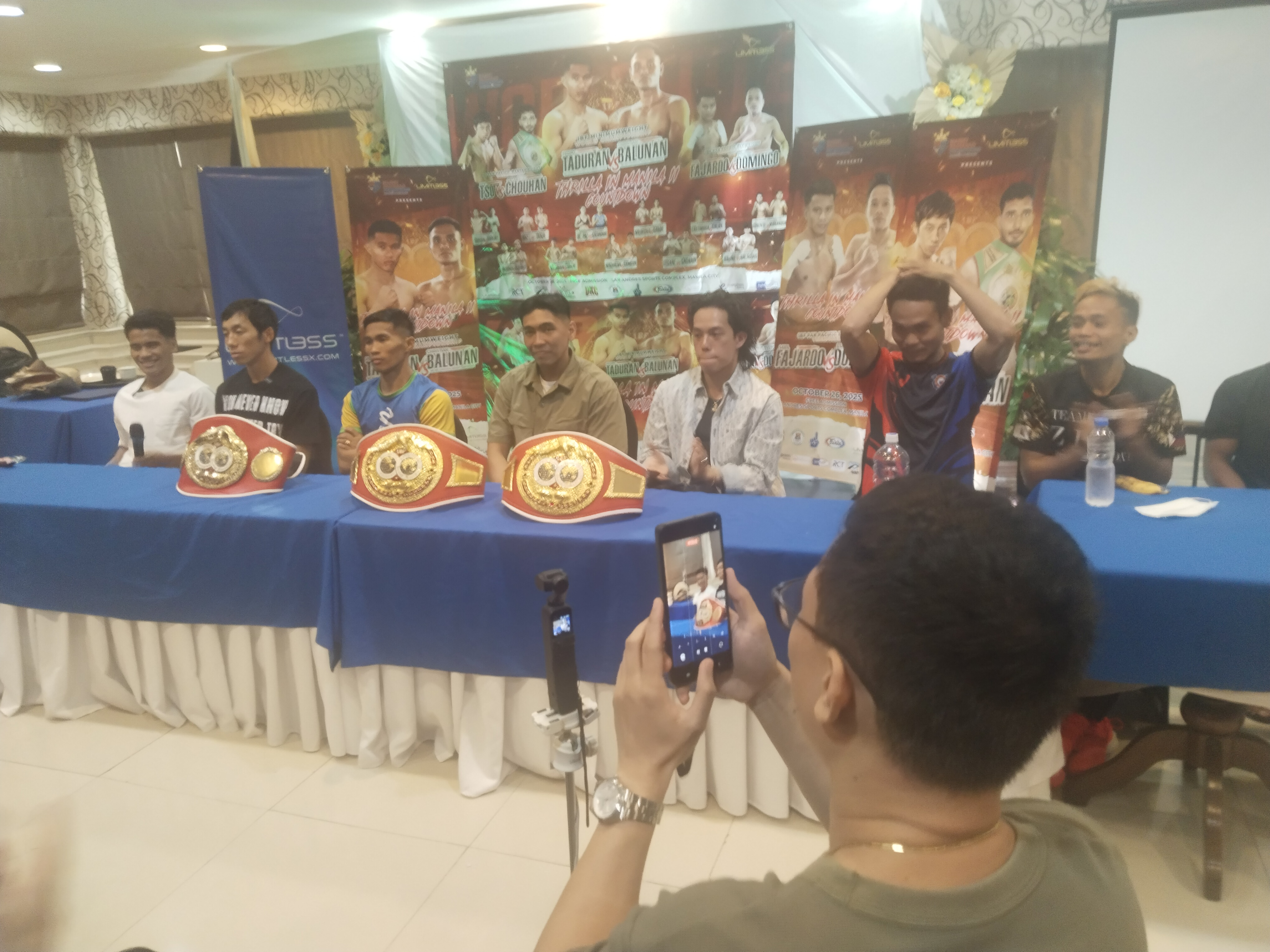
Salud during a Thrilla in Manila II Countdown press conference interview at Orchid Garden Suites, Manila, Philippines.

Salud obtained a Bachelor of Science in Computer Science on AMA University in Metro Manila. He is also engaged with several fields such as broadcasting, business process outscoring, digital marketing, and media leadership. He also participated on different boxing seminars such as a boxing judging seminar conducted by the World Boxing Council. In 2010, he founded Powcast.net, which became later known as Powcast Sports, a sports media platform that delivers expert analysis, in-depth interviews and real time sports coverage. He had covered and interviewed boxing world champions and other sports personalities such as Manny Pacquiao, Nonito Donaire, Iván Calderón, Koki Kameda, Rene Mark Cuarto, Memo Heredia, Tony Weeks, and Sean Gibbons. Aside from boxing, he also covers professional basketball (NBA and PBA), mixed martial arts, and other popular sports in the country. He has been featured as a guest color commentator and podcaster in various television networks such as TV5 for their sports coverage.

March 23, 2024, Salud was invited to the Gala of Champions at the Manila Grand Opera Hotel, at this event he crossed paths with some prominent names in Philippine boxing. (ALA Promotions) Antonio Lopez Aldeguer, Dong Secuya and also former 2 division champion Luisito Espinosa. As these men were part of the foundation and history of Modern Filipino boxing. Later that night he was awarded by the Philippine Boxing Historical Society and Hall of Fame for his passion and contribution to the sport.

August 11, 2024, Ho Chi Minh City, Vietnam,. Salud has been awarded and recognized for the contribution to the boxing development by the World Boxing Association during their Asia Convention that was held by the Vietnam Boxing Commission.

=== Thrilla in Manila: 50th Anniversary ===
Starting at October 4, 2025, Powcast Sports will have a YouTube's several special episodes on Thrilla in Manila 2: Vloggers Con! interviews with special guest current WBC Minimumweight champion Melvin Jerusalem and trainer Michael Domingo, Olympic medalist Eumir Marcial, and former unified world champion Marlon Tapales also including Manny Pacquiao's son Eman Bacosa, Blow by Blow's media head JC Barrera, matchmaker JC Manangquil and also some boxers who were featured on the undercard whom will all be participating on the road to Thrilla in Manila 2.0 were all be featured on mainstream media PTVSports Network which is one of the major Philippine networks.

October 23, 2025, Boxing Podcast: Powcast Sports livestream interview with special guest journalist and commentator Hayden Bruce James of SA Boxing Talk and also Kuse himself on the following day in which discuss the valuable insight to the career of the South African challenger on his preparations of his anticipated main event title match-up against Jerusalem at the Smart Araneta Coliseum.

=== Conflict with the Casimero brothers ===
Relationship between Pow Salud and John Riel Casimero together with his brother Jayson, once allies who collaborated on vlogs and training camp coverage. As all started as friendly collaboration between the two parties, with Salud supporting the Casimero brother's vlogging, devolved into bitter public quarrel that was played out on social media.

DWAR Abante Radyo reported the dispute about the two, even shows the Casimero brothers threaten Pow Salud on their livestream video on Facebook. Due to constant public arguments, heated atmosphere and controversies surrounding the Casimero brothers. On September 1, 2025, Pow Salud has officially cut ties relating to the Casimero brothers however he continues to cover their boxing career. The situations still remain a huge discussion among the Philippine Boxing community on social media.

== Accolades ==
- 2022 - YouTube:Brandcast "Powcast Sports" featured channel.
- 2019 - Plaque of Recognition "resource speaker", Games and Amusement Board.

== Media portrayals ==
- Portrayed as the ring announcer on the final match, in the 2021 Philippine-Japanese sports biographical film, Gensan Punch.
