= Muhammad Ali Boxing Reform Act =

2000 U.S. federal law

- Long title: An Act to reform unfair and anticompetitive practices in the professional boxing industry
- Acronyms (colloquial): MABRA
- Nicknames: Ali Act
- Enacted by: the 106th United States Congress
- Effective: May 26, 2000

Citations
- Public law: 106-210

Codification
- Acts amended: Professional Boxing Safety Act of 1996

Legislative history
- Introduced in the House as H.R. 1832 by Mike Oxley (R–OH) on May 17, 1999; Passed the House on November 8, 1999; Passed the Senate on April 7, 2000; Signed into law by President Bill Clinton on May 26, 2000

The Muhammad Ali Boxing Reform Act Pub. L. 106–210 (text) (PDF) is a United States federal law regarding the regulation of professional boxing that was enacted on May 26, 2000. Named after boxer Muhammad Ali, it aimed to "reform unfair and anticompetitive practices in the professional boxing industry" and followed on from the Professional Boxing Safety Act of 1996. These two pieces of legislation taken together are commonly referred to as the "Ali Act".

== Background ==
As of the 1990s, professional boxing was a multibillion-dollar industry, with much of that business conducted in the United States. The interests of boxing promoters directly conflicted with those of the boxers, as the promoter's profit on an event increases if the boxer accepts less money for a bout. Due to this conflict of interest, boxers require that their managers must negotiate strongly on their behalf and both parties must have relatively equal bargaining power or boxers may be coerced into signing unfavorable contracts. Match fixing was a common occurrence and rankings were manipulated to benefit boxers aligned with powerful promoters and managers. Despite the large amount of revenue generated in professional boxing, few boxers made significant amounts of money, and they were financially exploited by both promoters and managers, who often colluded against the boxer to maximize their own income.

Boxers generally came from poor backgrounds and were reliant on the sport to provide income for their families. These conditions led to rampant abuse by unethical parties which controlled the boxing industry. Boxing was first regulated at state level by New York in 1896. Since that point, state boxing commissions were the only parties which had "the legal and legislative authority to regulate a boxing event." These commissions were often staffed with political appointees and were ineffective. In response, the United States federal government investigated the sport. Estes Kefauver, chair of the U.S. Senate Antitrust and Monopoly Subcommittee, held hearings regarding professional boxing starting in 1960, in particular examining the influence of organized crime within the sport. Several attempts were made to federally regulate the sport, but none were successful until the 1990s.

A notable example of exploitation in boxing was that of Mike Tyson, the former undisputed heavyweight world champion. After being released from prison in 1995, Tyson earned around $140 million over his next six boxing matches. In a 1998 lawsuit, it was alleged that his promoter Don King had exploited Tyson's illiteracy to make him sign business contracts which paid "consulting fees" to King's family members and billed Tyson for "travel expenses incurred by King and those who traveled with him to meet Tyson as well as the cost of security, corporate cars, renovations at King's businesses, unusually large purses to other undercard fighters promoted by King, and fees for King's legal battles." In total, Tyson alleged that King—whom he had entrusted with complete control of his financial interests—had defrauded him of over $100 million. In 2004, Tyson reached a settlement in which he dropped his lawsuit against King in exchange for a $14 million payment. At the time, Tyson was mired in debt and struggling to pay creditors. Tyson said of King, who had previously been sued by Muhammad Ali for underpayment in the 1980 fight against Larry Holmes: "I found out that someone I believed was my surrogate father, my brother, my blood figure turns out to be the true Uncle Tom, the true nigger, the true sellout. He did more bad to black fighters than any white promoter ever in the history of boxing."

== Professional Boxing Safety Act of 1996 ==
The Professional Boxing Safety Act of 1996 (PBSA), enacted as Pub. L. 104–272 (text) (PDF) on October 9, 1996, found that revenue generated from television broadcasts of boxing matches had reduced the importance of ticket sales, which meant organizers could effectively avoid states which attempted to regulate boxing by holding fights elsewhere, even in areas with little potential for ticket receipts. Boxers who had received medical suspensions in one state could simply fight in another state. Although it jeopardized the health and safety of the fighter, this practice known as "state hopping" was encouraged by unscrupulous promoters and managers. States also competed in a race to the bottom to lower regulatory burdens in order to attract boxing matches and the associated economic activity. The PBSA, sponsored by John McCain (R–AZ) and Richard Bryan (D–NV), contained vestiges of earlier proposals by William Roth (R–DE) and stated that professional boxing was incapable of self-regulation due to the conflicts of interest and corruption within the sport.

The PBSA mandated that all professional boxing matches must be sanctioned by a state boxing commission, all boxers must register with a commission and maintain identification cards, all boxers who fight must be deemed physically capable of doing so and must carry adequate health insurance in the event of an emergency, and medical personnel must be present at all boxing matches. Promoters, managers, matchmakers, and boxers found to be in violation of the PBSA would face criminal penalties including imprisonment and/or fines. The PBSA received criticism for being limited in scope and overly moderate; McCain stated that he was focused on a wider reform of the sport and implied that the PBSA was the first in a series of steps towards the federal regulation of boxing.

== Passage of the Muhammad Ali Boxing Reform Act ==
The Muhammad Ali Boxing Reform Act (S.2238) was introduced in June 1998 by Senator John McCain (R–AZ), co-sponsored by Richard Bryan (D–NV) and Byron Dorgan (D–ND). The bill followed on from the PBSA and aimed to "reform unfair and anticompetitive practices in the professional boxing industry." Although the Senate passed the bill, the 105th United States Congress ended before the House took up the measure. The Muhammad Ali Boxing Reform Act (H.R.1832) was introduced by Representative Mike Oxley (R–OH) in May 1999. Oxley said: "What was once a great sport has been taken over by greed and abuse. Boxing fans ought to be able to watch a fair fight, and boxers deserve a fair reward for their sport."

The bill passed the House in November 1999 by voice vote. The passage of the bill was blocked in the Senate by an anonymous hold. This was reported to be the work of Senator Harry Reid (D–NV), who had previously described boxing promoters Bob Arum and Don King as his most important constituents. Reid denied being responsible for the hold on the bill and stated that he opposed the bill as it did not address that networks such as HBO and Showtime could have as much undue influence on boxing as promoters or managers. Reid also said his opposition to the bill was unrelated to a $50,000 soft money donation he had received from Don King Productions in September 1999. An amendment to the Act proposed by Reid that "casinos, hotels, resorts, etc., that are merely 'associated' with a promoter are not subject to the rules applicable to promoters" was agreed to in the Senate by unanimous consent in April 2000. The bill was subsequently passed by the Senate and the House and was signed into law by President Bill Clinton on May 26, 2000, becoming Public Law No: 106-210.

The passage of the Act garnered praise from boxing fans, pundits, media outlets and most promoters. Bob Arum of Top Rank said: "I've become one of the big advocates of the [Ali Act]." Don King was opposed to the Act, as was the International Boxing Federation president Bob Lee. Criticism was directed at the federal government's involvement in boxing, which had been regulated solely by the states prior to the 1990s. This dispute had been addressed by the Supreme Court of the United States in United States v. International Boxing Club of New York, Inc. (1955), which found that although boxing matches were of a "local" nature, the fact that they were promoted and broadcast on a multistate level made them subject to federal law.

== Purposes ==
The Muhammad Ali Boxing Reform Act outlined three purposes:

- (1) to protect the rights and welfare of professional boxers on an interstate basis by preventing certain exploitive, oppressive, and unethical business practices;
- (2) to assist State boxing commissions in their efforts to provide more effective public oversight of the sport; and
- (3) to promote honorable competition in professional boxing and enhance the overall integrity of the industry.

The Act placed a one-year limit for coercive contracts, meaning that a fighter could not be forced into a lengthy contract in order to receive a title shot or other lucrative fight. Conflict of interest between managers and promoters was also prohibited, meaning promoters would be forbidden from forcing boxers they sign to a promotional deal to also sign with a manager on the payroll of the promoter. Senator McCain stated: "When fighters are allowed to be free agents, they obviously get a much higher value for their services."

Rating organizations were also reformed under the Act and hidden payments to influence the ranking of boxers was prohibited; full disclosure of their policies, voting members and bylaws was required. Financial disclosures from promoters to state boxing commissions were mandated, and promoters were also mandated to provide boxers with information regarding all revenue generated from the events. Boxing promoter Bob Arum stated that, prior to the passage of the Act, "a fighter getting $50,000 from a main event might not [know] the promoter was getting $1 million from the network." The Act additionally ordered "misconduct reciprocity", which requires state commissions to uphold the disciplinary suspensions of other states. Violation of the Act was punishable by imprisonment and/or fines up to $100,000. Boxers were also permitted to bring private lawsuits against promoters.

== Enforcement of the Ali Act ==
The utility of the Ali Act was limited by the fact that the intended beneficiaries, the boxers, were expected to recognize and assert their own contractual rights. Boxers generally had limited formal education and were often unfamiliar with contract law. Additionally, the Association of Boxing Commissions (ABC), referenced in the Ali Act as an overseer of the sport's numerous state boxing commissions, was endowed with no power to enforce its guidelines. State boxing commissions were merely suggested to follow guidelines developed by the ABC, a "non-profit group with no regulatory power."

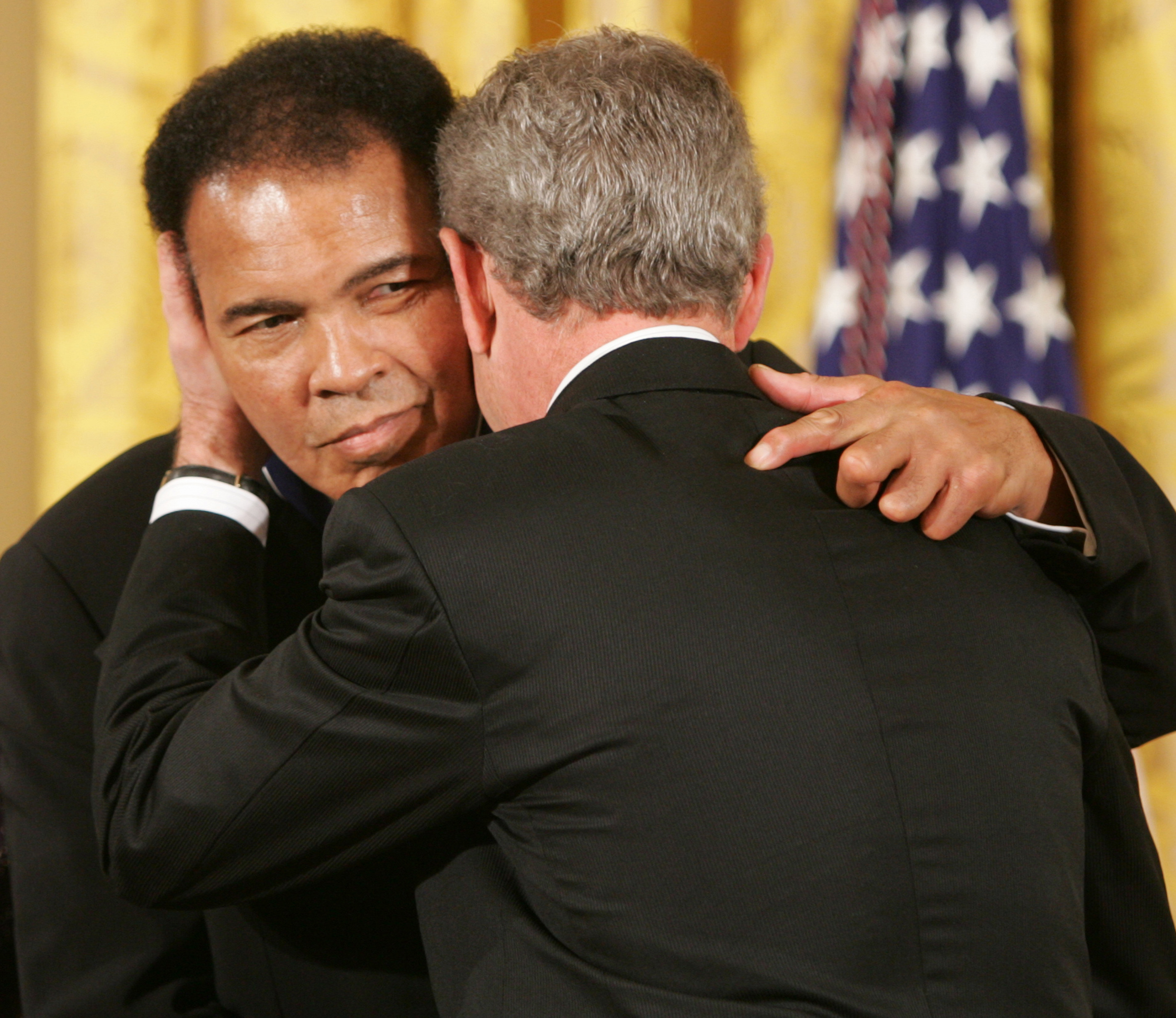
President George W. Bush embraces Ali after presenting him with the Presidential Medal of Freedom in 2005, during ceremonies at the White House

Concerned with the lack of reform made within boxing under the Ali Act, Senator John McCain (R–AZ) introduced the Professional Boxing Amendments Act of 2002 (PBAA), in an attempt to create a United States Boxing Administration within the United States Department of Labor. This body would have a presidentially appointed "boxing czar" to regulate the sport. Muhammad Ali, by this stage suffering from Parkinson's disease, gave testimony at a hearing for the bill in May 2002 via his wife Lonnie, calling for the creation of a "national oversight body". Alongside opposition from boxing promoters, the PBAA received pushback due to its perceived federal encroachment against state boxing commissions as well as the budgetary costs; the Congressional Budget Office reported that the PBAA "would require $34 million in funding over a five-year period." The bill stalled and was not enacted into law.

A 2007 report by Thomas Hauser of ESPN said that there had been numerous violations of the Ali Act, but the United States Department of Justice had not brought indictments against any individuals. Tim Lueckenhoff, president of the ABC, said: "When the ABC was formed, we thought we were going to accomplish some important things, but we have no real power to deal with violations of the Ali Act. So we're in a situation now where we have this law. We're trying to uphold it. It's a federal law. And we're getting no help whatsoever from U.S. Attorneys around the country."

As of 2011, the Ali Act had rarely been invoked but had provided some protections to boxers. Fernando Guerrero invoked the Ali Act in September 2011 against Prize Fight Promotions for not disclosing proceeds of two of his televised bouts. Boxing promoters used this point against their competitors in mixed martial arts (MMA), which began to rival boxing commercially but was not covered by the Ali Act. Ben Fowlkes of The Athletic stated in 2021: "It hasn't been a cure-all in boxing, that's for sure. Fighters have complained about lax enforcement and incomplete financial disclosures. Even those who have used it to challenge promoters in court still face the same problem as MMA fighters when battling over contract legality – the wheels of justice move slowly, and time usually isn't on a pro athlete's side. Still, at least the Ali Act provides a framework for what is and isn't allowed in terms of contracts and disclosures. That framework doesn't currently exist in MMA, giving promoters lots of leeway in how they operate."

== Proposed expansion of the Ali Act to mixed martial arts ==
By 2011, the Ultimate Fighting Championship (UFC) had consolidated control of MMA. In this position, the UFC began to "lock out" fighters over contractual disputes, such as Jon Fitch, who was cut from the UFC in 2008 for refusing to sign a lifetime contract for the use of his name and likeness in video games. He was later re-signed by the UFC after agreeing to the company's terms. Senator John McCain (R–AZ) proposed the Professional Boxing Amendments Act of 2007, which would have amended the Professional Boxing Safety Act of 1996. The UFC's parent company, Zuffa, hired lobbying firm Brownstein Hyatt Farber Schreck to oppose McCain's bill, which ultimately failed.

In May 2016, the Muhammad Ali Expansion Act was introduced by Representative Markwayne Mullin (R–OK), a former mixed martial artist, to extend the Ali Act to cover MMA and other combat sports alongside boxing. Elements of the Ali Act such as requirements that referees and judges be sanctioned by state commissions had already become standard practice in most MMA organizations. If enacted, the expansion of the Ali Act may have forced changes to the UFC's operations such as its limited financial disclosures to fighters and its long-term contract structures, including the "champion's clause" which permits the UFC to extend a fighter's contract if he or she is champion at the conclusion of the contract. Mullin stated: "The way it works right now, if you get a UFC contract, it's a take-it-or-leave-it mentality."

In response to the bill, the UFC hired lobbying group Farragut Partners to convince Congress that the Ali Act should not apply to MMA. The UFC's chief operating officer, Lawrence Epstein, said: "We continue to believe the federal government would have no productive role in regulating MMA promotions or competitions." In 2019, UFC hall of famer Randy Couture said that the Muhammad Ali Expansion Act was facing significant resistance: "We're still being lobbied against pretty seriously. They've found ways to stall us. They bounced us from one committee. ... We had 60 bipartisan supporters in Congress. It looked like a no brainer, and then they somehow got us tossed to the Education committee and then we kind of have to start all over again." As of 2021, the expansion act had stalled in the committee stage and was not enacted into law.

== Muhammad Ali American Boxing Revival Act ==
In July 2025, Representatives Brian Jack (R–GA) and Sharice Davids (D–KS) introduced the Muhammad Ali American Boxing Revival Act (H.R. 4624) to amend the Ali Act. TKO Group Holdings, the parent company of the UFC and WWE, was the major driver behind the bill after the creation of Zuffa Boxing, a joint venture between TKO and the Saudi conglomerate Sela. Ari Emanuel, the chief executive officer of TKO Group Holdings, had hinted in a February 2025 interview that a push was being made to reshape the Ali Act.

The bill focuses on the establishment of Unified Boxing Organizations (UBOs), which would be able to operate independently from boxing's existing sanctioning bodies, the WBC, WBA, WBO, and IBF. The bill detailed compliance requirements for UBOs, such as minimum per‑round payments, mandatory medical examinations, and expanded health insurance. These provisions would provide benefits for boxers, while simultaneously pricing out small organizations from attempting to create UBOs. The bill would allow UBOs to operate in a separate legal framework to the existing Ali Act, where they would not be subject to certain elements of the Ali Act such as mandatory financial disclosures to fighters regarding event revenue.

Mike Tyson publicly supported the bill, stating in December 2025: "The Act does not alter the opportunities of those who are comfortable with the current system; it simply adds options for fighters who wish to pursue a different path that better suits their career goals." Lonnie Ali, widow of Muhammad Ali and co-founder of the Muhammad Ali Center, voiced her support of the bill, saying that it would add "some much-needed competition" into the governance of boxing. Nico Ali Walsh, a professional boxer and grandson of Muhammad Ali, stated that he opposed the bill. Oscar De La Hoya publicly opposed the bill, saying that TKO would use UBOs to gain control of boxing. Evander Holyfield issued an op-ed in The Wall Street Journal to oppose the bill in November 2025, stating that UBOs were "private leagues" and that "a company could control every part of the league". He stated that UBOs would be used to create UFC-style control over the sport of boxing.

The United States House Committee on Education and Workforce approved the bill in a 30–4 vote in January 2026. USA Boxing, the national governing body for amateur boxing in the United States, withdrew its support of the bill in March. On March 24, 2026, the Revival Act was passed by the House in a voice vote and advanced to the Senate. In April 2026, the United States Senate Committee on Commerce, Science, and Transportation held a hearing about the bill. Boxing promoter Oscar De La Hoya and active professional boxer Nico Ali Walsh spoke against the bill, while Tim Shipman, president of the ABC, and Nick Khan, board member of TKO Group Holdings, spoke in favor of the bill.
