= Georgiy Yunovidov =

Russian boxer

Georgiy Yunovidov Георгий Юновидов
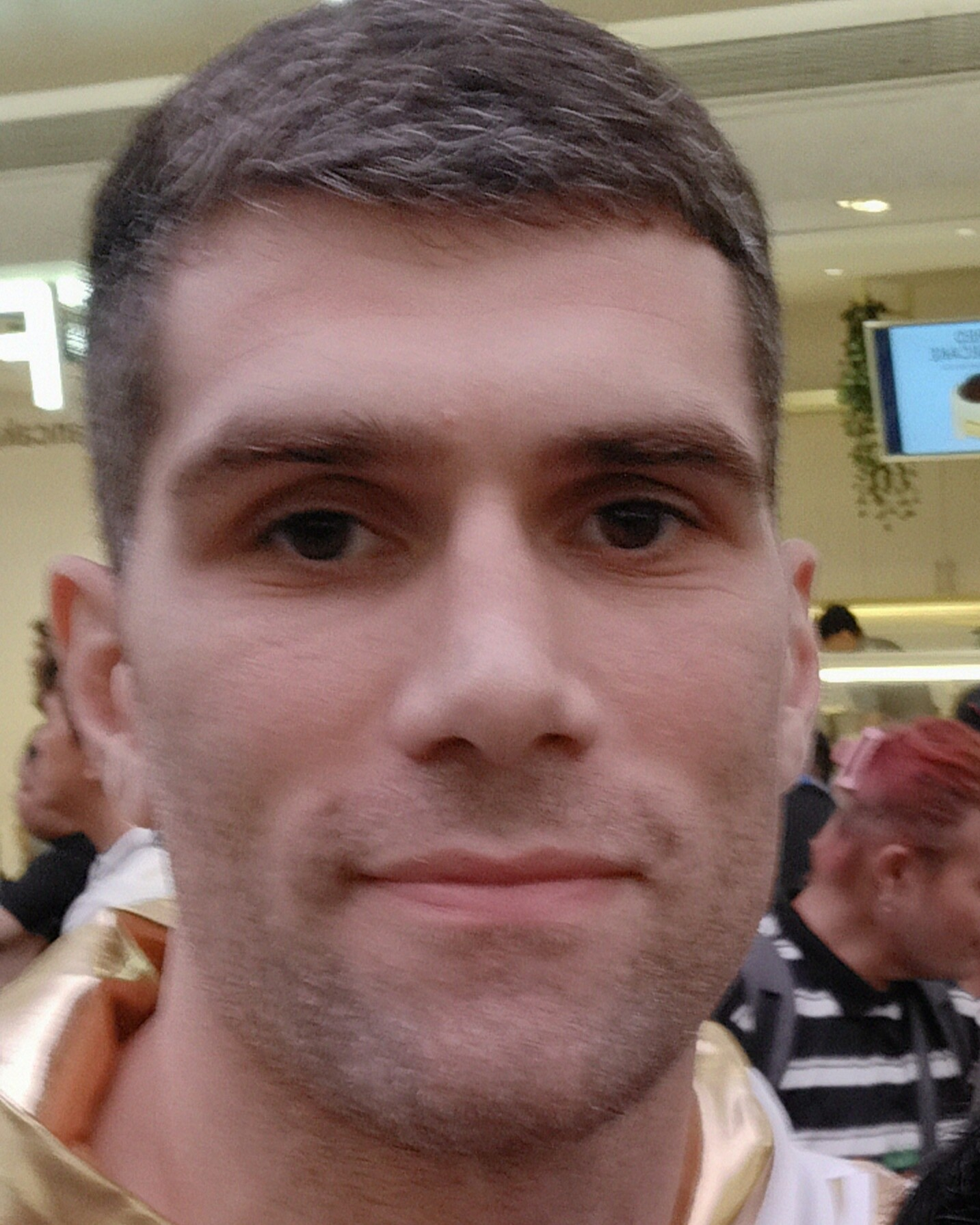
- Yunovidov in 2025

Personal information
- Born: October 9, 1992 (age 33) Rostov-on-Don, Russia
- Height: 6 ft 3 1/2 in (192 cm)
- Weight: Bridgerweight; Heavyweight

Boxing career
- Stance: Orthodox

Boxing record
- Total fights: 13
- Wins: 11
- Win by KO: 7
- Losses: 2

Georgy Yuryevich Yunovidov (Russian: Георгий Юрьевич Юновидов, born October 9, 1992) is a Russian professional boxer. He is currently the WBA interim bridgerweight champion since 2025.

== Professional career ==
Yunovidov turned professional in 2021, he had his first step up fight against Manibian contender Vikapita Meroro, he would win via fourth round stoppage. After compiling a record of 10–1, Yunovidov stopped Evgenyi Romanov in the fifth round to win the vacant WBA (Interim) bridgerweight title.

== Professional boxing record ==
13 fights	11 wins	2 losses
By knockout	7	2
By decision	4	0

No.	Result	Record	Opponent	Type	Round, time	Date	Location	Notes
13	Loss	11–2	Vartan Arutyunyan	TKO	6 (12), 1:53	Feb 14, 2026	Traktor Ice Arena, Chelyabinsk, Russia	Lost WBA interim bridgerweight title
12	Win	11–1	Evgenyi Romanov	RTD	5 (12), 3:00	Jul 5, 2024	DIVS, Yekaterinburg, Russia	Won vacant WBA interim bridgerweight title
11	Win	10–1	Vitaly Kudukhov	UD	10	Sep 6, 2024	Traktor Ice Arena, Chelyabinsk, Russia	
10	Win	9–1	Mirzohidjon Abdullaev	TKO	6 (8), 1:11	Feb 10, 2024	KRK Uralets, Yekaterinburg, Russia	
9	Win	8–1	Igor Vilchitskiy	RTD	5 (8), 3:00	Aug 17, 2023	KRK Uralets, Yekaterinburg, Russia	
8	Loss	7–1	Arslan Yallyev	KO	4 (10), 1:04	Mar 7, 2023	DIVS, Yekaterinburg, Russia	For vacant Russian heavyweight title
7	Win	7–0	Vikapita Meroro	RTD	4 (8), 3:00	Dec 11, 2022	DIVS, Yekaterinburg, Russia	
6	Win	6–0	Viktar Chvarkou	UD	8	Sep 11, 2022	Traktor Ice Arena, Chelyabinsk, Russia	
5	Win	5–0	Yury Bykhautsou	UD	8	May 21, 2022	RCC Boxing Academy, Yekaterinburg, Russia	
4	Win	4–0	Leandro Daniel Robutti	RTD	5 (8), 3:00	Feb 19, 2022	RCC Boxing Academy, Yekaterinburg, Russia	
3	Win	3–0	Julio Cesar Calimeno	KO	8 (8), 1:30	Nov 4, 2021	RCC Boxing Academy, Yekaterinburg, Russia	
2	Win	2–0	Otabek Mirzakhmedov	TKO	2 (6), 2:27	Jun 26, 2021	RCC Boxing Academy, Yekaterinburg, Russia	
1	Win	1–0	German Skobenko	UD	6	May 7, 2021	KRK Uralets, Yekaterinburg, Russia	

== IBA professional boxing record ==
2 fights	1 win	1 loss
By decision	1	1

No.	Result	Record	Opponent	Type	Round, time	Date	Location	Notes
2	Loss	1–1	Chris Thompson	UD	8	2025-10-29	Araneta Coliseum, Quezon City, Philippines	For vacant IBA Intercontinental heavyweight title
1	Win	1–0	Nursultan Amanzholov	UD	6	2024-06-29	Kirov, Kirov Oblast, Russia	

== See also ==
- List of male boxers

Sporting positions
World boxing titles
New title	WBA bridgerweight champion Interim title July 5, 2025 – February 14, 2026	Succeeded by Vartan Arutyunyan
