= Evgeny Romanov =

Evgeny Romanov may refer to:

- Evgeny Romanov (chess player) (born 1988), Russian chess grandmaster
- Evgenyi Romanov (born 1985), Russian heavyweight boxer
