= Chris Thompson (boxer) =

South African boxer (born 1995)

Personal information
- Nickname: The Wolf
- Nationality: South African
- Born: Christopher Andrew Thompson; February 2, 1995 (age 31) Gauteng, South Africa
- Height: 1.90 m (6 ft 3 in)
- Weight: Cruiserweight; Heavyweight

Boxing career
- Reach: 201 cm (79 in)
- Stance: Southpaw

Boxing record
- Total fights: 24
- Wins: 16
- Win by KO: 9
- Losses: 7
- Draws: 1

Christopher Andrew Thompson (born 2 February 1995) is a South African professional boxer who held the African Boxing Union heavyweight title in 2022.

== Professional career ==
=== RSA and ABU heavyweight champion ===
==== Thompson vs. Pretorious ====
On 11 June 2022, Thompson faced his debut foe, and current Republic of South Africa and List of African Boxing Union champions heavyweight champion Joshua Pretorius at the Emeperors Palace, Thompson won a lop-sided decision, outpointing the champion 120–108 in all of the judges' scorecards to dethrone him.

==== Cancelled bout vs. Ljungquist ====
In September 2022, Thompson was scheduled to face Danish rising prospect Kem Ljungquist for the WBC International bridgerweight championship, however, Thompson would pull out due to being hospitalized in the build-up.

==== Thompson vs. Gomes ====
On 11 December 2022, Thompson defended his titles against subsequent Riyadh Season WBC Boxing Grand Prix participant and semi-finalist Keaton Gomes at the Emperors Palace. Thompson would fall in his first defence as he was dropped thrice in the first round en route to a sixth-round stoppage loss, Thompson also fell in a loop of Republic of South Africa heavyweight title-holders falling in their first defence of the title.

=== Gatekeeper ===
On 7 March 2023, Thompson fought his third bout outside of his home country South Africa to face promising contender Evgenyi Romanov in Yekaterinburg, Russia. Thompson would lose a "dull fight", or rather an underwhelming fight ending with the scores of 73–79 and 74–78 twice. He was later scheduled in a bout against Solomon Dacres on 19 August 2023 in Birmingham. Thompson again lost in an underwhelming fight where Dacres outpointed him in full ten rounds.

On 17 November 2023, Thompson, undoubtedly, suffered his most severe loss yet of his career against decorated Bakhodir Jalolov in Tashkent, Uzbekistan as Thompson endured a first-round knockout after only a minute and ten seconds into the bout, this is also his fourth straight loss.

=== Rise up the ranks ===
==== Thompson vs. Potgieter ====
After three straight wins against respectable oppositions, Thompson faced Keaton Gomes-conqueror and current South African heavyweight champion Shaun Potgieter on 23 August 2025, Thompson dethroned Potgieter via seventh-round TKO.

==== Thrilla in Manila: The 50th Anniversary ====
Thompson was scheduled against reigning WBA interim bridgerweight champion and favourite Georgiy Yunovidov in an eight-rounder scheduled contest for the vacant IBA Intercontinental heavyweight championship in the Thrilla in Manila II undercard on 29 October 2025. Their bout represented the heavyweight division's premise and aspect of the event, commemorating the Thrilla in Manila bout between Muhammad Ali and Joe Frazier. Despite being the underdog, Thompson delivered a dominating and career-best unanimous decision win against Yunovidov, scoring an upset with the scores of 77–75 and 78–74 twice.

== Professional boxing record ==
24 fights	16 wins	7 losses
By knockout	9	4
By decision	7	3
Draws	1	

No.	Result	Record	Opponent	Type	Round, time	Date	Location	Notes
24	Loss	16–7–1	Shaun Potgieter	KO	7 (12)	18 Apr 2026	Carnival City Casino, Brakpan, South Africa	Lost South African heavyweight title
23	Win	16–6–1	Shaun Potgieter	TKO	7 (12)	23 Aug 2025	Carnival City Casino, Brakpan, South Africa	Won South African heavyweight title
22	Win	15–6–1	Mussa Ajibu	TKO	3 (8)	1 May 2025	SunBet Arena, Pretoria, South Africa	
21	Win	14–6–1	Alexandru Jur	UD	8	23 Aug 2024	Emperors Palace, Kempton Park, South Africa	
20	Win	13–6–1	Juan Roux	UD	8	15 Jun 2024	Emperors Palace, Kempton Park, South Africa	
19	Loss	12–6–1	Bakhodir Jalolov	KO	1 (10), 1:10	17 Nov 2023	Humo Arena, Tashkent, Uzbekistan	
18	Loss	12–5–1	Solomon Dacres	UD	10	19 Aug 2023	Utilita Arena, Birmingham, England	
17	Loss	12–4–1	Evgenyi Romanov	UD	8	7 Mar 2023	DIVS, Yekaterinburg, Russia	
16	Loss	12–3–1	Keaton Gomes	TKO	6 (12), 1:58	11 Dec 2022	Emperors Palace, Kempton Park, South Africa	Lost South African and African heavyweight titles
15	Win	12–2–1	Joshua Pretorius	UD	12	11 Jun 2022	Emperors Palace, Kempton Park, South Africa	Won South African and African heavyweight titles
14	Draw	11–2–1	Shafic Kiwanika	MD	6	13 Oct 2021	Mtana Hall, Dar es Salaam, Tanzania	
13	Win	11–2	Mussa Ajibu	TKO	3 (8)	18 Sep 2021	Parkview Centre, Pretoria, South Africa	
12	Win	10–2	Imani Daudi Kawaya	UD	6	28 May 2021	Next Door Arena, Dar es Salaam, Tanzania	
11	Win	9–2	Limbani Lano	UD	6	9 Nov 2019	Turffontein Racecourse, Johannesburg, South Africa	
10	Win	8–2	Youssouf Kasongo Mwanza	RTD	3 (6), 3:00	23 Jun 2019	Time Square, Pretoria, South Africa	
9	Win	7–2	Lebogang Mashitoa	SD	6	10 Feb 2019	Time Square, Pretoria, South Africa	
8	Win	6–2	Didier Nywembwe	TKO	2 (6)	21 Oct 2018	Time Square, Pretoria, South Africa	
7	Loss	5–2	Akani Phuzi	KO	2 (10)	22 Apr 2018	Blairgowrie Recreation Centre, Randburg, South Africa	
6	Win	5–1	Mduduzi Moyo	TKO	2 (4)	23 Mar 2018	Community Centre, Edenvale, South Africa	
5	Win	4–1	James Katende	TKO	2 (6)	4 Dec 2017	Emperors Papace, Kempton Park, South Africa	
4	Loss	3–1	Akani Phuzi	PTS	6	22 Oct 2017	Blairgowrie Recreation Centre, Randburg, South Africa	
3	Win	3–0	Antonello Maree	TKO	2 (4)	9 Sep 2017	Emperors Palace, Kempton Park, South Africa	
2	Win	2–0	Tshilidzi Mulaudzi	TKO	2 (4)	23 Jul 2017	Emperors Palace, Kempton Park, South Africa	
1	Win	1–0	Joshua Pretorius	PTS	4	26 May 2017	Sibaya Casino & Ent. Kingdom, Durban, South Africa	

== IBA professional boxing record ==
1 fight	1 win	0 losses
By decision	1	0

No.	Result	Record	Opponent	Type	Round, time	Date	Location	Notes
1	Win	1–0	Georgiy Yunovidov	UD	8	29 Oct 2025	Araneta Coliseum, Quezon City, Philippines	Won vacant IBA Intercontinental heavyweight title
