= Vadim Tukov =

Russian boxer (born 1994)

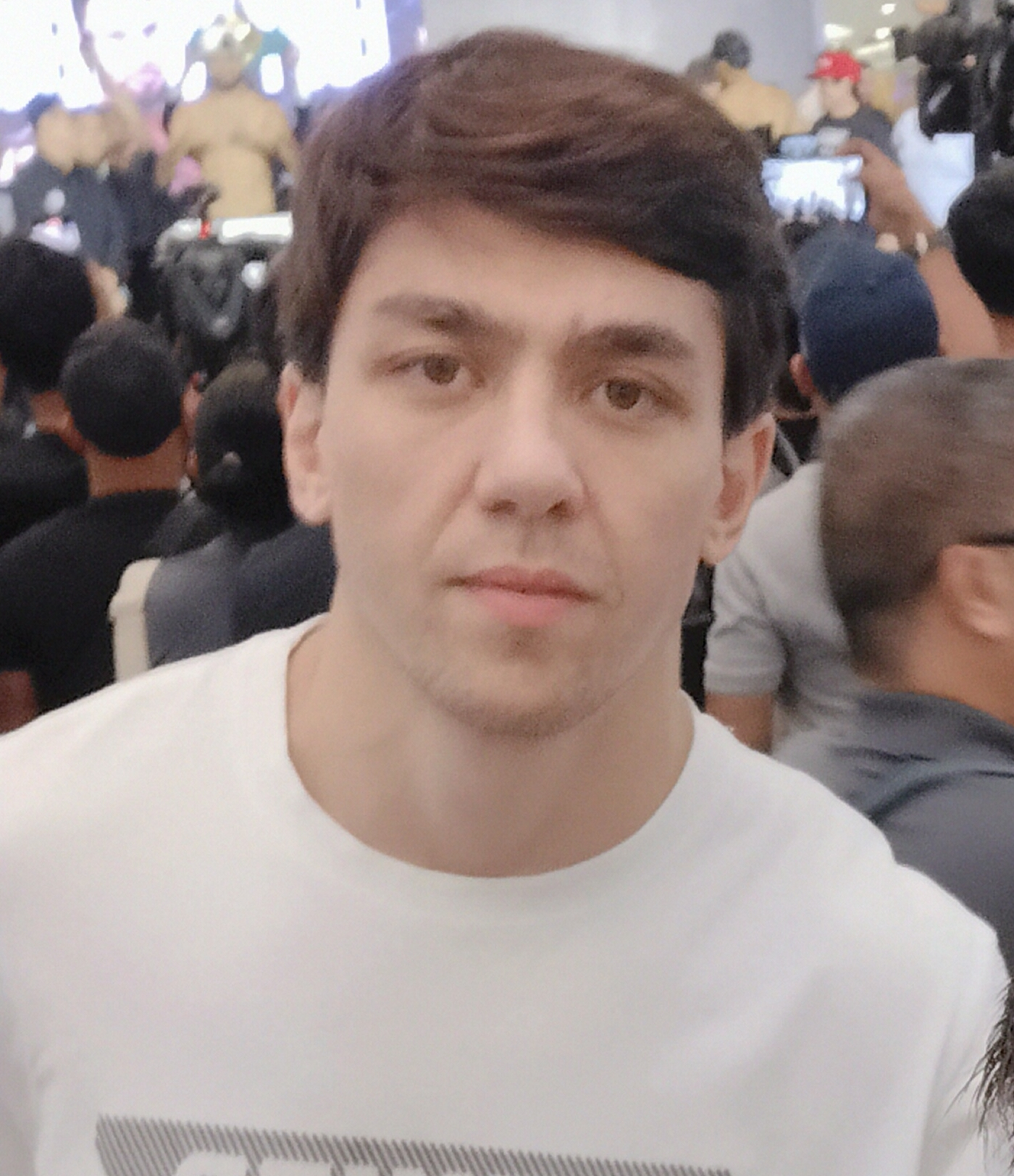
- Tukov in 2025

Personal information
- Nationality: Russian
- Born: Вадим Александрович Туков; 10 February 1994 (age 32) Mozdok, Russia
- Height: 6 ft (183 cm)
- Weight: Middleweight

Boxing career
- Stance: Orthodox

Boxing record
- Total fights: 16
- Wins: 16
- Win by KO: 7

Vadim Tukov (born 10 February 1994) is a Russian professional boxer who currently competes in the middleweight division.

== Professional career ==
=== Tukov vs Fozilov ===
Tukov took on Bakhromjon Fojilov on June 17, 2023 in Yekaterinburg. Despite winning easily on the cards, the general verdict was that it was a lot closer than what the judges scored with Fojilov having success in the third, eighth and ninth rounds. Tukov controlled the majority of the fight with his jab.

=== Tukov vs Ponomarev ===
Tukov picked up an impressive win against the very experienced Konstantin Ponomarev at the RCC boxing tournament in Yekaterinburg. Tukov stopped Ponomarev by technical knockout in the seventh round.

=== Tukov vs Madiev ===
Tukov faced Magomed Madiev for the vacant WBA International middleweight title. In what was expected to be a close fight, Tukov despite having a few moments of trouble won comfortably on the cards.

=== Tukov vs Abdukakhorov ===
Tukov is currently scheduled to face Kudratillo Abdukakhorov on July 5 in Yekaterinburg.

== Professional boxing record ==
16 fights	16 wins	0 losses
By knockout	7	0
By decision	9	0

No.	Result	Record	Opponent	Type	Round, time	Date	Location	Notes
16	Win	16–0	Kudratillo Abdukakhorov	RTD	7 (10), 3:00	5 Jul 2025	DIVS, Ekaterinburg, Russia	
15	Win	15–0	Magomed Madiev	UD	10	6 Sep 2024	Traktor Sport Palace, Chelyabinsk, Russia	
14	Win	14–0	Konstantin Ponomarev	RTD	6 (10), 3:00	23 Mar 2024	RCC Boxing Academy, Ekaterinburg, Russia	
13	Win	13–0	Ulugbek Sobirov	MD	10	11 Nov 2023	RCC Boxing Academy, Ekaterinburg, Russia	
12	Win	12–0	John Bopape	KO	4 (8), 0:48	8 Sep 2023	Traktor Sport Palace, Chelyabinsk, Russia	
11	Win	11–0	Bakhromjon Fozilov	UD	10	17 Jun 2023	RCC Boxing Academy, Ekaterinburg, Russia	
10	Win	10–0	Viktar Murashkin	UD	8	7 Mar 2023	DIVS, Ekaterinburg, Russia	
9	Win	9–0	Alexander Elizarov	TKO	5 (8), 1:16	19 Nov 2022	RCC Boxing Academy, Ekaterinburg, Russia	
8	Win	8–0	Brian Damian Chaves	KO	6 (10), 1:44	11 Sep 2022	Traktor Sport Palace, Chelyabinsk, Russia	
7	Win	7–0	Mikalai Vesialou	UD	10	21 May 2022	RCC Boxing Academy, Ekaterinburg, Russia	
6	Win	6–0	Joel Julio	UD	8	19 Feb 2022	RCC Boxing Academy, Ekaterinburg, Russia	
5	Win	5–0	Manuk Dilanyan	TKO	8 (8), 1:05	4 Nov 2021	RCC Boxing Academy, Ekaterinbur, Russia	
4	Win	4–0	Ivan Nikonov	MD	8	26 Jun 2021	RCC Boxing Academy, Ekaterinburg, Russia	
3	Win	3–0	Ravshan Ergashev	UD	6	17 Apr 2021	RCC Boxing Academy, Ekaterinburg, Russia	
2	Win	2–0	Farrukh Juraev	UD	8	15 Jun 2020	USC Soviet Wings, Moscow, Russia	
1	Win	1–0	Snamiso Ntuli	TKO	6 (6), 0:58	1 Feb 2020	Yantarny Sports Palace, Kaliningrad, Russia	

== IBA professional boxing record ==
2 fights	2 wins	0 losses
By decision	2	0

No.	Result	Record	Opponent	Type	Round, time	Date	Location	Notes
2	Win	2–0	Sena Agbeko	UD	8	29 Oct 2025	Araneta Coliseum, Quezon City, Philippines	Won vacant IBA Intercontinental middleweight title
1	Win	1–0	Adam Belalia	UD	6	7 Mar 2025	Dynamo Volleyball Arena, Moscow Russia	
