= Vartan Arutyunyan =

Russian boxer (born 1999)

Vartan Arutyunyan Վարդան Հարությունյան
Personal information
- Born: December 27, 1999 (age 26) Sochi, Russia
- Height: 6 ft 1 in (185 cm)
- Weight: Bridgerweight

Boxing career
- Stance: Southpaw

Boxing record
- Total fights: 12
- Wins: 12
- Win by KO: 8

Vartan Oganesovich Arutyunyan (Armenian: Վարդան Օգանեսովիչ Հարությունյան, born December 27, 1999) is a Russian professional boxer.

== Professional career ==
Arutyunyan turned professional in 2019. In his sixth fight he beat Yury Bykhautsou via unanimous decision. In his first step up in competition, Arutyunyan would defeat Georgiy Yunovidov to win the WBA interim bridgerweight title.

== Professional boxing record ==
12 fights	12 wins	0 losses
By knockout	8	0
By decision	4	0

No.	Result	Record	Opponent	Type	Round, time	Date	Location	Notes
12	Win	12–0	Georgiy Yunovidov	TKO	6 (12), 1:53	Feb 14, 2026	Traktor Ice Arena, Chelyabinsk, Russia	Won WBA interim bridgerweight title
11	Win	11–0	Vitaly Kudukhov	UD	8	Aug 9, 2025	RCC Boxing Academy, Yekaterinburg, Russia	
10	Win	10–0	Kareb Shitana	TKO	6 (8), 1:44	Mar 15, 2025	RCC Boxing Academy, Yekaterinburg, Russia	
9	Win	9–0	Dilan Prašović	TKO	1 (8), 2:47	Nov 30, 2024	RCC Boxing Academy, Yekaterinburg, Russia	Won vacant Russian lightweight title
8	Win	8–0	Wilmer Vásquez	KO	1 (8), 1:47	Mar 23, 2024	RCC Boxing Academy, Yekaterinburg, Russia	
7	Win	7–0	Vladislav Vishev	TKO	3 (8), 2:21	Nov 11, 2023	RCC Boxing Academy, Yekaterinburg, Russia	For vacant Russian lightweight title
6	Win	6–0	Yury Bykhautsou	UD	6	Jul 22, 2023	RCC Boxing Academy, Yekaterinburg, Russia	Won vacant WBC CISBB lightweight title
5	Win	5–0	German Skobenko	TKO	5 (6), 1:01	Nov 25, 2022	Concert Hall Mir, Moscow, Russia	
4	Win	4–0	Viktar Chvarkou	UD	6	Oct 19, 2022	Prime Hall Complex, Yerevan, Armenia	
3	Win	3–0	Alphonce Mchumiatumbo	TKO	1 (6), 1:52	May 21, 2021	Khimki Basketball Center, Khimki, Russia	
2	Win	2–0	Ivan Bezverkhyi	UD	4	Nov 29, 2019	VTB Arena, Moscow, Russia	
1	Win	1–0	Shokhrukh Zakirov	TKO	1 (4), 2:03	Jun 9, 2019	Soviet Wings Sport Palace, Moscow, Russia	

== See also ==
- List of male boxers
- List of southpaw stance boxers

Sporting positions
World boxing titles
Preceded by Georgiy Yunovidov	WBA bridgerweight champion Interim title February 14, 2026 – present	Incumbent
