= Evgenyi Romanov =

Russian boxer (born 1985)

Personal information
- Full name: Evgenyi Aleksandrovich Romanov
- Nationality: Russian
- Born: 20 July 1985 (age 40) Volgograd, Russian SFSR, Soviet Union
- Height: 183 cm (6 ft 0 in)
- Weight: Cruiserweight; Bridgerweight; Heavyweight

Boxing career
- Stance: Orthodox

Boxing record
- Total fights: 21
- Wins: 19
- Win by KO: 12
- Losses: 2
Medal record
Men's Amateur boxing
Representing Russia
European Junior Championships
| Gold medal – first place | 2003 Warsaw | Heavyweight |
Youth World Boxing Championships
| Gold medal – first place | 2004 Jeju | Heavyweight |
World University Championships
| Bronze medal – third place | 2004 Antalya | Heavyweight |
Representing Volgograd
Russian National Championships
| Silver medal – second place | 2005 Magnitogorsk | Heavyweight |
| Silver medal – second place | 2006 Khanty-Mansiysk | Heavyweight |
| Silver medal – second place | 2008 Kaliningrad | Heavyweight |
| Gold medal – first place | 2009 Chekhov | Heavyweight |

Evgenyi Aleksandrovich Romanov (Russian: Евгений Александрович Романов, born 20 July 1985) is a Russian professional boxer. As an amateur, Romanov won gold at the Junior World Championship in 2004 and the Russian Championships 2009 in the heavyweight division.

== Amateur career ==
At the world junior championships in 2004, Romanov stopped all his opponents with his vaunted power, including Robert Alfonso.

On a national level Romanov had the problem that Russian amateur boxing is so talent-laden. At the Russian nationals 2005 (seniors, 90 kg) he beat future Olympic gold medallist Rakhim Chakkhiev 36-17 in the semifinal but lost the final to world and European champion Aleksandr Alekseyev. In 2006 he lost the final to world silver medallist Roman Romanchuk, in 2007 he beat Sergey Kalchugin but exited early in the quarters against unknown Musalchi Magomedov. At the Russian nationals 2008 he lost the final to future European and World Champion Egor Mekhontsev 5-19. In the absence of Mekhontsev he beat Kalchugin again to win his first Russian Senior Championship in 2009.

Romanov holds a win over Deontay Wilder at the amateur level via knockout in 2008.

== Professional career ==
Romanov made his professional debut against Viktar Chvarkou on 30 July 2016, and won the fight by a third-round technical knockout. Romanov amassed an 11-0 record during the next two years, with eight of those victories coming by way of stoppage.

Romanov was scheduled to face Dillon Carman for the inaugural WBO Global heavyweight title on 22 February 2019, at the KRK “Uralets” in Ekaterinburg, Russia. The fight was set as a ten-round bout, for the first time in Romanov's career. He won the fight by a first-round knockout.

Romanov made his first WBO Global title defense against Ariel Bracamonte on 16 June 2019. Romanov beat the much bigger Bracamonte by unanimous decision, with all three judges awarding him a 99-90 scorecard.

Romanov was scheduled to face Dario German Balmaceda in a non-title bout on 24 August 2019, at the Traktor Sport Palace in Chelyabinsk, Russia. He won the fight by a first-round technical knockout. Romanov made his second and last WBO Global title defense against Siarhei Liakhovich on 7 November 2020. He won the fight by a second-round knockout.

It was announced on 5 April 2021, that Romanov would face Dmitry Kudryashov for the inaugural WBC Silver bridgerweight title, as well as the position of mandatory challenger. The fight was scheduled for 21 May 2021, and was contested at the Khimki Basketball Center in Khimki, Russia. He won the fight by a wide unanimous decision, with scores of 120-108, 119-109 and 119-109.

The WBC briderweight champion Óscar Rivas was officially ordered to make his first title defense against Romanov on 16 November 2021. The two camps came to an agreement, regarding the terms of the fight, on 15 February 2022. The bout was expected to take place in June 2022.

== Professional boxing record ==
| 21 fights | 19 wins | 2 losses |
|---|---|---|
| By knockout | 12 | 2 |
| By decision | 7 | 0 |

| No. | Result | Record | Opponent | Type | Round, time | Date | Location | Notes |
|---|---|---|---|---|---|---|---|---|
| 21 | Loss | 19–2 | Georgiy Yunovidov | RTD | 5 (12), 3:00 | 5 Jul 2025 | DIVS, Yekaterinburg, Russia | For vacant WBA interim bridgerweight title |
| 20 | Loss | 19–1 | Zhaoxin Zhang | KO | 2 (10), 2:24 | 10 Feb 2024 | KRK “Uralets”, Ekaterinburg, Russia | |
| 19 | Win | 19–0 | Wilmer Vasquez | UD | 10 | 8 Sep 2023 | Traktor Sport Palace, Chelyabinsk, Russia | |
| 18 | Win | 18–0 | Chris Thompson | UD | 8 | 7 Mar 2023 | DIVS, Ekaterinburg, Russia | |
| 17 | Win | 17–0 | Vikapita Meroro | RTD | 7 (10), 3:00 | 19 Aug 2022 | Luzales Arena, Syktyvkar, Russia | |
| 16 | Win | 16–0 | Dmitry Kudryashov | UD | 12 | 21 May 2021 | Basketball Center, Khimki, Russia | Won inaugural WBC Silver bridgerweight title |
| 15 | Win | 15–0 | Siarhei Liakhovich | KO | 2 (10), 1:48 | 7 Nov 2020 | RCC Boxing Academy, Ekaterinburg, Russia | Retained WBO Global heavyweight title |
| 14 | Win | 14–0 | Dario German Balmaceda | TKO | 1 (10), 2:33 | 24 Aug 2019 | Traktor Sport Palace, Chelyabinsk, Russia | |
| 13 | Win | 13–0 | Ariel Bracamonte | UD | 12 | 16 Jun 2019 | KRK “Uralets”, Ekaterinburg, Russia | Retained WBO Global heavyweight title |
| 12 | Win | 12–0 | Dillon Carman | KO | 1 (10), 1:53 | 22 Feb 2019 | KRK “Uralets”, Ekaterinburg, Russia | Won inaugural WBO Global heavyweight title |
| 11 | Win | 11–0 | Gabriel Enguema | TKO | 6 (8), 1:13 | 8 Dec 2018 | RCC Boxing Academy, Ekaterinburg, Russia | |
| 10 | Win | 10–0 | Marcelo Nascimento | KO | 6 (8), 2:08 | 14 Jul 2018 | RCC Boxing Academy, Ekaterinburg, Russia | |
| 9 | Win | 9–0 | Denis Bakhtov | TKO | 1 (8), 2:15 | 22 Apr 2018 | DIVS, Ekaterinburg, Russia | |
| 8 | Win | 8–0 | German Skobenko | TKO | 7 (8), 0:49 | 10 Feb 2018 | DIVS, Ekaterinburg, Russia | |
| 7 | Win | 7–0 | Tornike Puritchamiashvili | UD | 6 | 15 Dec 2017 | DIVS, Ekaterinburg, Russia | |
| 6 | Win | 6–0 | Oleksandr Nesterenko | KO | 2 (6), 2:15 | 18 Nov 2017 | Event-Hall, Solnechnyy, Russia | |
| 5 | Win | 5–0 | Murodbek Azimov | UD | 6 | 7 Sep 2017 | Kristall Ice Palace, Saratov, Russia | |
| 4 | Win | 4–0 | Gogita Gorgiladze | TKO | 2 (6), 1:45 | 27 May 2017 | Event-Hall, Solnechnyy, Russia | |
| 3 | Win | 3–0 | Yury Bykhautsou | UD | 6 | 5 Feb 2017 | Expocentre, Volgograd, Russia | |
| 2 | Win | 2–0 | Vladimir Goncharov | TKO | 1 (6), 2:01 | 25 Nov 2016 | Korston Club, Moscow, Russia | |
| 1 | Win | 1–0 | Viktar Chvarkou | TKO | 3 (4), 2:38 | 30 Jul 2016 | Galaktika Centre, Estosadok, Russia | |
