= Melvin Jerusalem vs. Siyakholwa Kuse =

2025 boxing match

Thrilla in Manila: 50th Anniversary
- Date: October 29, 2025
- Venue: Araneta Coliseum, Cubao, Quezon City, Philippines
- Title on the line: World Boxing Council (WBC) mini-flyweight title.

Tale of the tape
Boxer	Melvin Jerusalem	Siyakholwa Kuse
Nickname	"El Gringo" (The Foreigner)	"One way"
Hometown	Manolo Fortich, Bukidnon, Philippines	Eastern Cape, South Africa
Pre-fight record	24–3 (12 KO)	9–2–1 (4 KO)
Age	31 years, 8 months	23 years, 3 months
Height	5 ft 2 in (1.57 m)	5 ft 2 in (1.57 m)
Style	Orthodox	Southpaw
Recognition	WBC mini-flyweight world champion The Ring No. 1 ranked mini-flyweight TBRB No. 3 ranked mini-flyweight	WBC No. 2 ranked mini-flyweight The Ring No. 4 ranked mini-flyweight TBRB No. 6 ranked mini-flyweight

Result
- Jerusalem wins via unanimous decision (115–113 and 116–112 twice)

Melvin Jerusalem vs. Siyakholwa Kuse, billed as Thrilla in Manila: 50th Anniversary and IBA Pro 11, was a professional boxing event held at the Araneta Coliseum in Quezon City, Philippines on 29 October 2025. It was promoted as commemorating the 50th anniversary of the "Thrilla in Manila" between Muhammad Ali and Joe Frazier, held at the same venue on 1 October 1975.

The main event saw Filipino boxer Melvin Jerusalem defeat South African challenger Siyakholwa Kuse by unanimous decision to retain his WBC mini flyweight championship. On the undercard, Ali's grandson Nico Ali Walsh fought Thai boxer Kittisak Klinson to a draw, 2025 SEA Games gold medalist Eumir Marcial defeated 11-0 Eddy Colmenares, and Filipino bantamweight Carl Jammes Martin extended his unbeaten streak to 27–0 by beating Aran Dipaen. As part of the IBA Pro circuit, interim WBA bridgeweight champion Georgiy Yunovidov lost his title to Chris Thompson, while Vadim Tukov defeated Sena Agbeko.

== Background ==
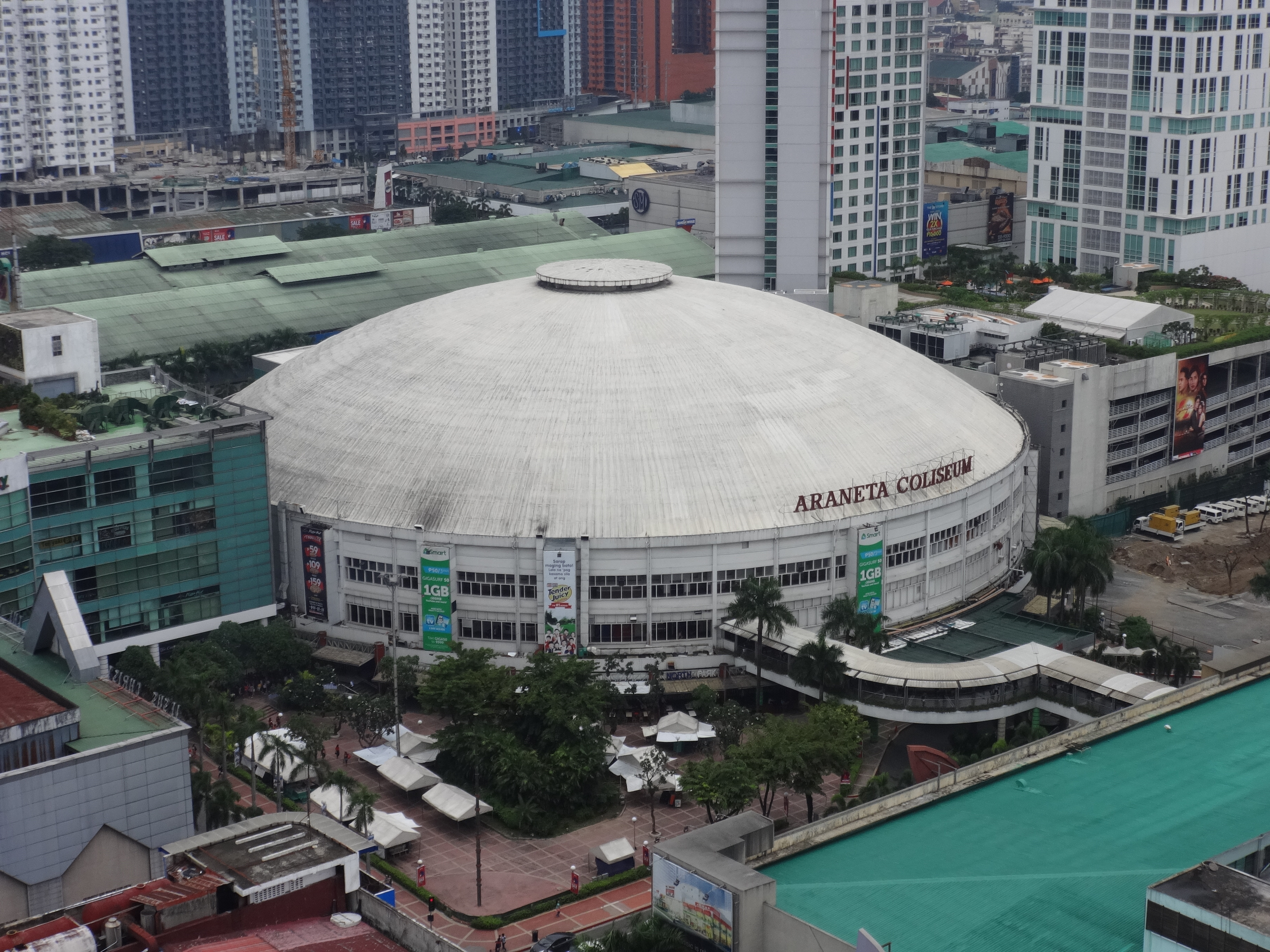
Araneta Coliseum, venue of the event.

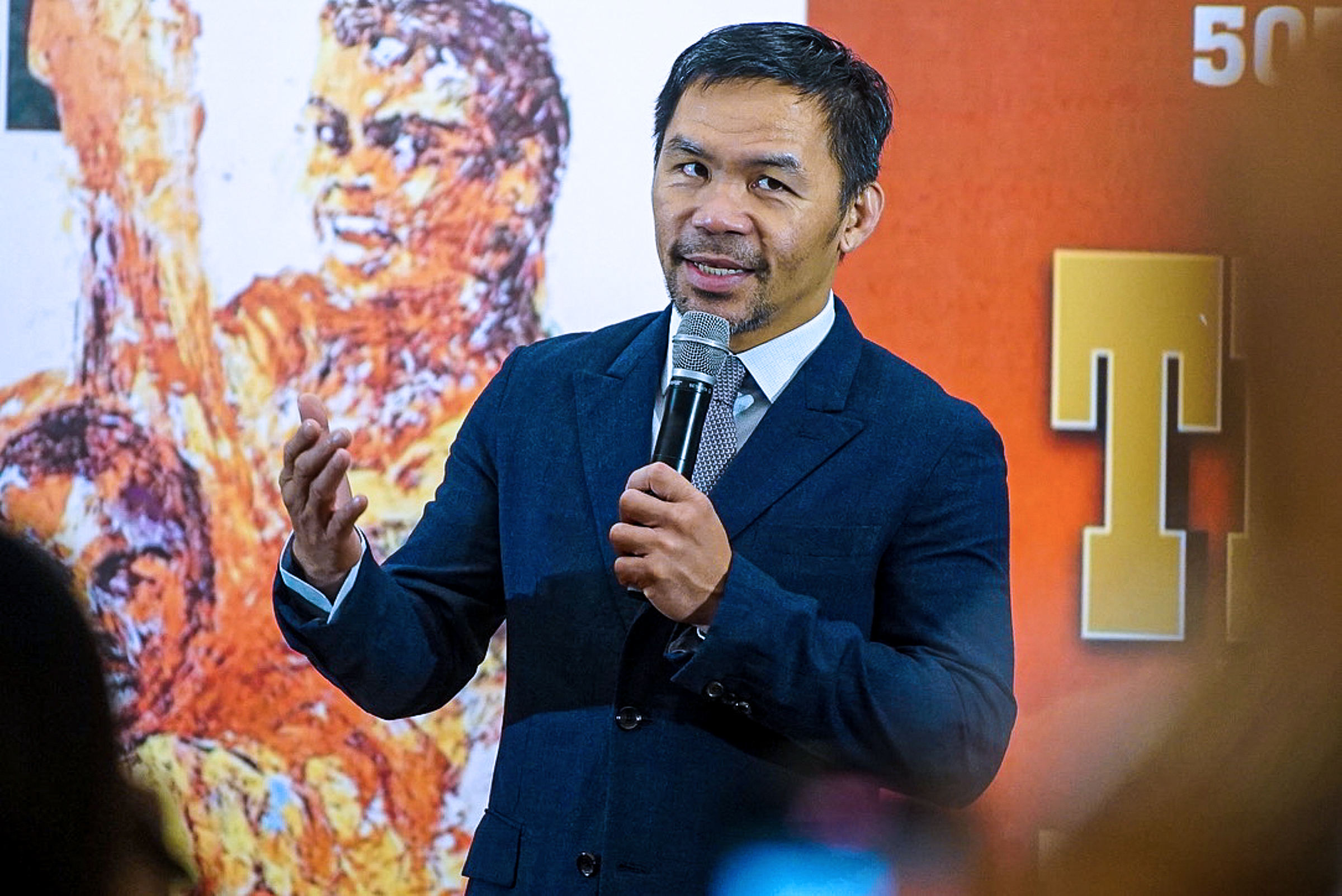
Manny Pacquiao at the event's press conference in October 2025.

The event was announced in December 2024 as a commemoration of the 50th anniversary of the "Thrilla in Manila" at Araneta Coliseum in 1975, the third and final match of the trilogy between Muhammad Ali and Joe Frazier. The event would be promoted via Manny Pacquiao's MP Promotions and the International Boxing Association (IBA), and provisionally scheduled for 4 October 2025.

MP Promotions head Sean Gibbons suggested that depending on the results of matches leading up to it, the card could feature as many as three title matches involving Filipino boxers, such as mini flyweight Melvin Jerusalem and superfeatherweight Mark Magsayo. Invites were extended to dignitaries associated with the original fight and Ali, including promoters Bob Arum and Don King, referee Carlos Padilla Jr., Larry Holmes (who defeated Ali in 1980), Ali's daughter Laila, and Frazier's daughter Jacqui Frazier-Lyde. Muhammad Ali's son Nico Ali Walsh was slated to face Thai boxer Kittisak Klinson, Walsh stated in a press conference that "fighting in Manila, where my grandfather made history, is a dream come true."

Originally, the co-main event was to be a WBC super-featherweight title eliminator between former WBC featherweight champion Mark Magsayo and reigning WBC Silver super-featherweight champion Michael Magnesi. In late-August 2025, it was reported that the bout had been dropped from the card and was likely to be contested at a Premier Boxing Champions event instead. The match was later considered for the undercard of Mario Barrios vs. Ryan Garcia in February 2026, but dropped after the match became promoted by The Ring instead of PBC, and Magsayo began to push towards challenging the lightweight division instead.

== Reception ==
Thrilla-in-Manila 50th Anniversary Alamat Special Edition Gold-Plated Commemorative Medal 2025.

Tagline named as (Thrilla in Manila 2) received different reviews from both of the boxing fans and critics in the Philippines. In particular veteran writer Ding Marcelo of SPIN.ph express his opinion about the idea Just the thought that somebody had the gall to call a coming fight "Thrilla in Manila" is an insult as it dishonors the memory of that classic encounter between Ali and Fraizer in 1975, at the Araneta Coliseum. Pacquiao should be the last person to invoke the names of Ali and Frazier for a card headlined by Melvin Jerusalem, who is staking his World Boxing Council mini-flyweight crown against a still unnamed opponent. But if Pacquiao is short of a marketing tagline for a card headlined by a guy named Jerusalem, I have a suggestion. How about: “A Trip to Jerusalem.” While MP Promotions liaison officer/representative Mark Lontayao & sport analyst Pow Salud opposed to the said writer. The "Thrilla in Manila"- The 50th anniversary is an insult? Absolutely not. At worst, one could say it's "not enough" to match the original. But to call it an insult is unfair as fans will witness an affordable ticket for the event featuring a world title defense by Melvin Jerusalem and a stacked card showcasing the brightest young Filipino stars. Pacquiao's Blow by Blow has consistently staged events with selling afordable tickets, making this tribute a genuine gift to boxing fans – not a cash grab, not a marketing ploy.

Jerusalem's longtime trainer and former boxer Michael Domingo quickly defended his boxer after learning of the columnist's remarks. — "Why would he say that? Melvin is a world champion who has brought honor to the Philippines. This will be his third title defense. We only have two world champions in the country right now. We should be supporting our world champions, so they’ll be more inspired. But that’s his opinion. As for us, we’ll just stay focused on the fight" Domingo said.

== IBA.Pro 11 Boxing Tournament ==
IBA.Pro 11: Georgiy Yunovidov vs. Chris Thompson
- Title on the line: IBA.Pro Intercontinental in the heavyweight title

Tale of the tape
Boxer	Georgiy Yunovidov	Chris Thompson
Nickname		"The Wolf"
Hometown	Rostov-na-Donu, Russia	Gauteng, South Africa
Pre-fight record	IBA.pro 1–0 (0 KO)	IBA.pro Debut
Age	33 years	30 years, 8 months
Height	6 ft 3 1/2 in (192 cm)	unstated
Style	Orthodox	Southpaw
Recognition	WBA Interim bridgeweight Champion	

Result
- Thompson wins via unanimous decision (77–75 and 78–74 twice)

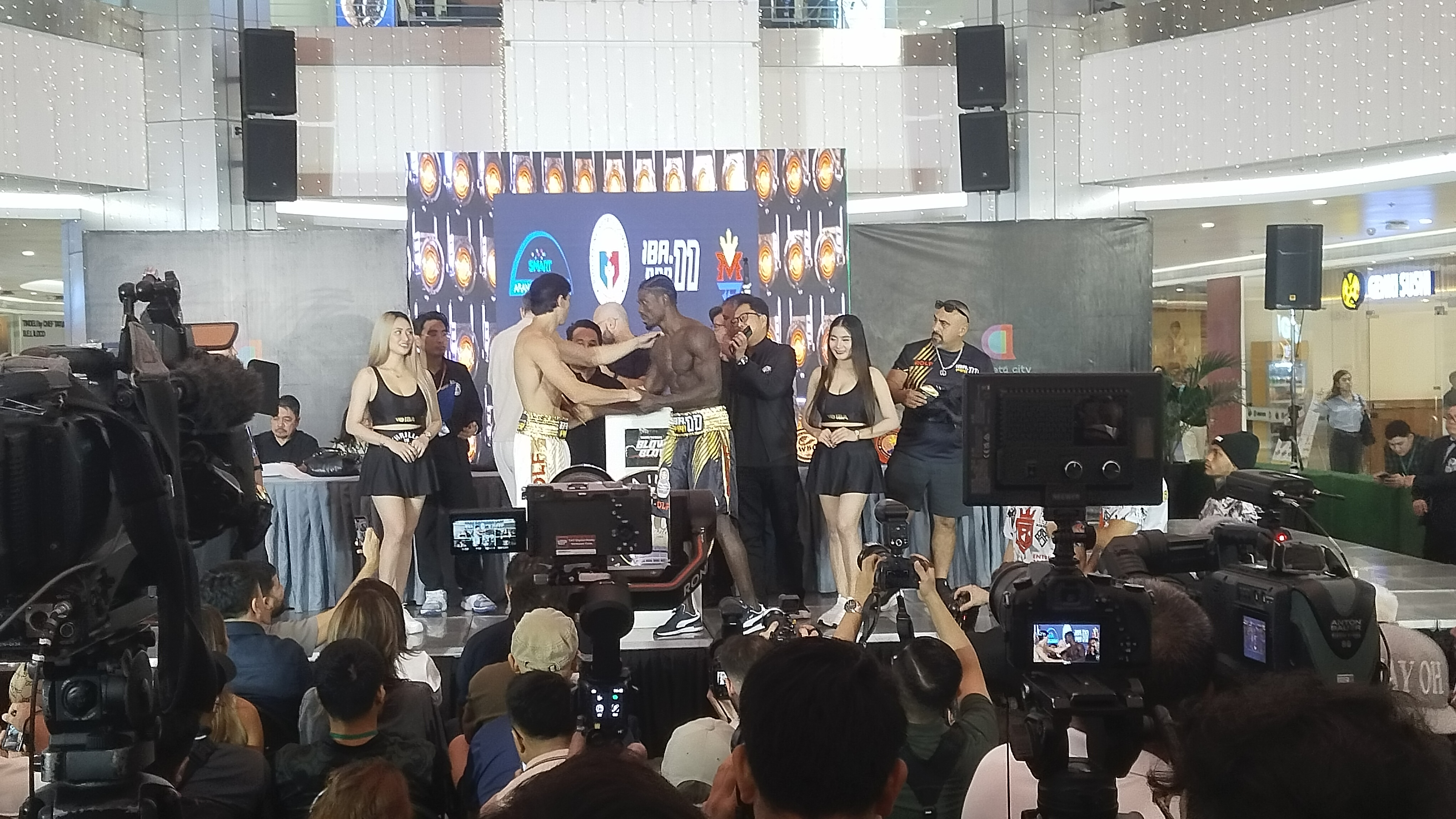
IBA's representative boxers during the ceremonial weigh-in event at Gateway Mall 2, Quantum Skyview, Cubao, between Vadim Tukov and Sena Agbeko on October 28, 2025.

Russian boxer Georgiy Yunovidov is set to challenge Chris Thompson of South Africa for the IBA.PRO Intercontinental in the heavyweight title. The ten-round fight have taken place on October 29 in the Philippines as part of the IBA.PRO 11 tournament and will be dedicated to the 50th anniversary of the legendary show "Thriller in Manila". The organizers of the upcoming evening in the Philippines will be the International Boxing Association (IBA) and the famous boxer Manny Pacquiao. Initially, Yunovidov's opponent was supposed to be American John Cantrell, but the boxer is unable to perform due to medical reasons. In connection with the replacement of the opponent, the status of the fight has also changed – the title of the IBA.PRO Intercontinental, and not the full belt of the IBA.PRO, will be at stake. In addition, as part of the IBA.PRO 11 event, WBA Gold champion Vadim Tukov will be facing American boxer of Ghanaian origin Sena Agbeko in a ten-round fight for the Intercontinental middleweight belt IBA.PRO. Agbeko is known for his fights against Osleys Iglesias, Vladimir Shishkin and David Morrell.

== Event personnel ==
=== Broadcast team ===
Role	Name
Commentator	Quinito Henson
Commentator	Anthony Suntay
Commentator	Andy Clarke
Ring announcer	Ted Lerner
Ring announcer	Bobby Modejar
Timekeeper	Kim Dangan
Timekeeper	Romulo Santiago
Official Photographer	Wendell Alinea
Official Photographer	Jay Otamias
Ringside Physicians	Dr. Clark Joel Fernandez
Ringside Physicians	Dr. Noel Nathaniel Napa

=== Officials ===
Referees and Judges:

- (Philippines) Danilo Lopez
- (Philippines) Eduardo Noblesa
- (Philippines) Elmo Coloma
- (Philippines) Nowel Haduca
- (Philippines) Sammy Bernabe
- (Philippines) Elmer Costillas
- (Philippines) Vergilio Garcia
- (Philippines) Gregorio Ortega
- (Philippines) Arnie Najera
- (Philippines) Jojo Llanera
- (Philippines) Silvestre Abainza
- (Philippines) Jerrold Tomeldan
- (Australia) Samantha Bulner
- (Mongolia) Zanashir Taznaa
- (South Korea) Jun Bae Lim
- (Japan) Nobuto Ikehara
- (Mexico) Cesar Castañon

== Broadcasting ==
Country	Broadcaster	Official social media partner
Philippines (host)	PTV Sports; Blow by Blow; ABS-CBN Sports; Cignal TV; One Sports; Pilipinas Live (delayed broadcast event)	Powcast Sports
Switzerland	IBA Pro Boxing (YouTube)	—N/a
South Africa; United Kingdom	Supersport; Connect-ime	—N/a
Japan; Taiwan; Italy; Germany; France; Portugal; Belgium; United States; Canada; Brazil; Australia	DAZN (Streaming media)	—N/a

== Undercards Fights Summaries ==
=== Match No.1 (Eman Bacosa vs Nico Salado) ===
Start of the opening bout in a six-round match the son of the legendary Manny Pacquiao, unbeaten Eman Bacosa entered as the naturally the bigger guy of the two, pressing the action at the opening round using his size and reach advantage to outworked Nico Salado. While on the second round Salado retaliates pressuring with his own flurry of power punches closing the distance forcing Bacosa into a defensive state. Round four Bacosa was able to find his rhythm using his jabs hitting Salado several times setting up for a strong combination to Salado's head earning Bacosa a knockdown. Through the final round Salado pursuing to be the aggressor but was still outworked by Bacosa's combination and was able to hurt Salado until the final bell ending the match both showing respect and honor to one another. All three judges scored (Danilo lopez 58–55, Eduardo Noblesa 60–53, Elmo Coloma 58–55) in favor to Bacosa as the winner via unanimous decision.

=== Match No.2 (Albert Francisco vs Ramel Macado Jr.) ===
Albert Francisco faced Ramel "the sharp" Macado Jr. in an eight-round professional boxing match for the vacant WBC International Silver Flyweight championship. As both boxers put up an entertaining exchanges from the start to finish, Macado had the lead on the early rounds but Francisco came back winning the latter rounds the bout ended in via Majority Draw as judges (Samantha Bulner and Silvestre Abainza both scored a draw of 76-76, while Jerol Tomeldan had it 77-75 for Francisco).

=== Match No.3 (Ronerick Ballesteros vs Speedy Boy Acope) ===
In an eight-round bout Ballesteros put on a dominant performance in a decisive stoppage defeating Acope via TKO as referee Sammy Bernabe stopped the fight in the 0:50 of the fifth round, claiming the vacant Philippine Youth lightweight title. Acope known for his speed fought hard but couldn't overcome Ballesteros power. With this victory Ballesteros improved his unbeaten record to 6 wins and 4 KO's, while Acope suffers the second defeat of his career.

=== Match No.4 (Arvin Magramo vs Berland Robles) ===
Defending WBC International light flyweight champion Arvin Magrmo defeated Robles via ten round split decision in a tough, action-packed fight where Magramo's relentless pressure and volume punching, especially after a strong start, ultimately won in a close contest, though Robles showed resilience and came back but got a one-point deduction from referee Nobuto Ikehara for excessive holding on the tenth-round that would have tip the scale on the champion's favor leading to a narrow win. As Judges: Zanashir Taznaa 96-93 and Jojo Llanera 95-94 for Magramo, only judge Arnie Najera 95-94 for Robles earning his first career defeat.

=== Match No.5 (Marlon Tapales vs Fernando Toro) ===
Former 2-Division and Unified super-bantamweight world champion "The Nightmare" Marlon Tapales proved above tough Venezuelan underdog Fernando Toro in their ten-round contest. Tapales showed his superior technical ability and experience in an entertaining yet one-sided match up landing heavy combinations to the body followed by a strong blow to the head putting his opponent on his knees. Referee Nowel Haduca counted out Toro earning Tapales a six-round emphatic knockout victory.

=== Match No.6 (Vadim Tukov vs Sena Agbeko) ===
Russian Unbeaten super-middleweight prospect Vadim Tukov outpointed American Sena Agbeko on their eight-round bout in the IBA.Pro contest. As both men landed heavy punches from the opening round but it was the cleaner shots of Tukov (16–0, 9 KOs, 2-0 IBA Pro) that secured and favored him a unanimous decision victory on the judges: (Vergilio Garcia 78–74, Elmo Coloma 78–74, Gregorio Ortega 79–73) scorecards against the tough Agbeko (29–4, 23 KOs, 0-1 IBA Pro) becoming the new IBA.Pro Intercontinental middleweight champion.

=== Match No.7 (Nico Ali-Walsh vs Kittisak Klinson) ===
Nico Ali Walsh (11–2–1, 5 KOs), grandson of legendary heavyweight champion Muhammad Ali—who fought at the same arena against Joe Frazier 50 years ago—faced Thai fighter Kittisak Klinson (10–2–1, 6 KOs) in a competitive eight-round middleweight bout. Klinson started strongly, pressuring Ali Walsh back to the ropes and landing heavy punches. Amid the cheering crowd chanting “Ali, Ali, Ali,” Walsh showcased flashes of his grandfather's showmanship, even performing the famous “Ali shuffle,” much to the audience's delight. Despite a strong finish from Ali Walsh, the fight ended in a majority draw, with judges scoring it as Nowel Haduca 76-76, Vergilio Garcia 77-75 for Klinson, and Eduardo Noblesa 76-76.

Nico Ali-Walsh stated after the match ~ "First off I want to thank God for this opportunity," following the conclusion of the bout. "Thank you to everyone for coming out. The Filipino fans are amazing. Thank you to my Opponent, to Umar Kremlev, Manny Pacquiao, Mr. President Bong-Bong Marcos for the opportunity. Of course i wanna thank my family, my parents and coaches."

"I wouldn't be here today if not for God and my grandfather, so I want to thank my grandfather for putting on an amazing show fifty years ago in this arena. Thank you guys for having me, and I hope to be back soon. I don't agree with the decision, but i know you all guys saw the real victor tonight. Thank you all so much for coming out-you guys are the best! You have great fights ahead!"

=== Match No.8 (Georgiy Yunovidov vs Chris Thompson) ===
South African heavyweight Chris Thompson a career best win in an upset victory against the favored Russian Georgiy Yunovidov in a fiercely competitive eight round IBA.Pro heavyweight bout. Thompson landed the more heavy blows to Yonovidov on both head and body en route to a unanimous decision victory. Judges: (Nowel Haduca 77–75, Eduardo Noblesa 78–74, Danilo lopez 78–74).

=== Match No.9 (Carl Jammes Martin vs Aran Dipaen) ===
Filipino unbeaten bantamweight prodigy in his twenty-six professional contest, Carl Jammes Martin fought and overcame his biggest test on his career against former title challenger Aran Dipaen of Bangkok, Thailand on a hard-fought ten round bout. Martin was sent down to the canvas in the third round with a right hand by Dipaen. However, replays showed the fall was more on a balance issue nevertheless referee Eduardo Noblesa ruled it as a knockdown. Round four Martin comeback strong and stamped his authority on the bout with a volley of solid punches. Dipaen stayed competitive throughout the remainder of the match, landing several numbers of right hand to the young boxer. Still Martin continued to apply pressure on the front foot, scoring a knockdown on his own even via glancing uppercut at the eight round after the final round of the match official Judges: (Nowel Haduca 97–92, Vergilio Garcia 98–90, Gregorio Ortega 98–91) scored and declared Martin as the victor via unanimous decision. The young prospect expressed his gratitude stated "First of all I would like to give thanks to you all who have come to support, to the promoter, Senator Manny Pacquiao and Mr. President Bong Bong Marcos. I would also like to greet our Religious leader Brother Eduardo Manalo a blessed happy birthday and to my brothers and sisters at the Church of Christ thank you so much for your support. And also, to the boxing fans, and my beloved province of Ifugao, Cordillera"!

=== Match No.10 (Eumir Marcial vs Eddy Colmenares) ===
The co-main event was a ten-round fight for the empty WBC International Middleweight title between Eumir Felix Marcial from the Philippines and Eddy Colmenares from Venezuela.

Marcial unloading series of hook to the head and body from a southpaw stance on the early two rounds while Colmenares also gave his own fast phase combinations. At the third round an explosive one-two shot from Colmenares sent Marcial on his knees to the canvas giving him a clean knockdown and delivering a strong statement. Round four to six Marcial came back strong unleashing a flurry of power shots as well as the crowd cheered the two traded combinations and power punches, While Colmenares still standing his grounds returning his own punches to Marcial.

In the late middle rounds produced more blistering two-way action as both men were hurt repeatedly in a seismic battle of wills showing level of grit and determination not seen in Manila since Ali and Frazier stood toe-to-toe fifty years ago. WBC open scoring shows Marcial in a narrow lead entering the final round, with another explosive moment for Colminares scoring his second knockdown against Marcial with seconds remaining in the fight. Marcial recover as referee Nobuto Ikehara counted, he would drag himself up once again, remarkably surviving the final stages against a dangerous opponent from Venenzuela.

As the final bell was struck the two raised their hands as they wait for the judges official decision, Jerrold Tomeldan 94-94 scored a draw, while Jun Bae Lim and Arnie Najera both scored a narrow 95–93 in favor of the Filipino, a majority decision win as Marcial let it out a scream as he celebrated and claim the vacant WBC International Middleweight title. The Filipino bronze medalist Eumir Marcial rose to an undefeated record of (7–0, 4 KOs), while Eddy Colmenares (11–3–1, 11KO's) suffer his third defeat. The match was described as intense slugfest and was considered to be the best fight of the night relieving the spirit of Thrilla-in-Manila 50 years ago, and a possible rematch would likely to happen in the near future according to Manny Pacquiao.

== Main Event Fight Summary ==
In the main event card, reigning WBC Minimumweight World Champion Melvin Jerusalem (25–3, 12 KOs) of the Philippines battled his way to a fiercely-contested unanimous decision win over the South African challenger Siyakholwa Kuse (9–3–1, 4 KOs) after twelve high quality rounds of actions. Kuse put on a world-class performance, but Jerusalem's championship experience and ability to land the harder, cleaner punches in crucial moments, particularly the latter half, secured his third title defense.

On the opening round the young South African southpaw started fast, using his speed and slick movements to outwork the defending Filipino champion, landing quick flurries of combinations able catch some of the early rounds giving Jerusalem sorts of troubles. Round three Jerusalem seemed to drop Kuse cleanly with a counter left upside in the head, only for referee Cesar Castanon to rule it a slip as both fighter launching and landing shots against one another, yet neither men were actually taking in control at the moment. WBC open scoring announce after round four (38-38 2x, 39–37 in favor for the champion). After a strong fourth frame of Kuse, they traded furiously together in round 5 before Jerusalem's economical output was being criticized against a more active puncher throwing and pushing him back with volume and body attacks in the sixth.

The action became technically intense as it goes, with both fighters having moments but the champion slowly began finding his range, landing cleaner shots and threw a clean uppercut with half a minute left in the seventh at the beginning of the eighth, Jerusalem absorbed counter-punching flurries from a retreating Kuse, WBC open scoring were announced again after the round (77-75 2x for Jerusalem, and 77–75 in favor for Kuse). Entering the championship rounds they exchanged body shots early in the ninth; Kuse scored with rights hands before referee warned the champion for punching after calling a break. Jerusalem landed a solid right that stumbled Kuse back before the bell in the tenth closing the round strongly as now they entered the final six minutes.

At the eleventh round despite Kuse's aggressive attempt, Jerusalem catches him with consecutive counter punching throwing some bigshots that landed on the head. Both giving all they got for the last three minutes as Jerusalem wobbled Kuse with a straight right hand 15 seconds from the end, they both swung for the fences near the ropes before sharing a respectful embrace after a gritty duel as neither could be sure they did enough to win.

However, it would be the cleaner shots of Melvin Jerusalem that was able to gave him a strong finish en route to a 12-round unanimous decision win over the younger fighter from Eastern Cape. The judges scored the bout (116-112 2x and 115–113) to retain his WBC strawweight belt for third time. Siyakholwa Kuse may have failed to capture his first world title attempt, but the South African challenger left the ring with his reputation enhanced after his display of southpaw skills making the boxing world take notice on an evening that celebrated the 50th Anniversary of the one of sport's memorable battles.

=== Scorecard ===
Samantha Bulner		Jun Bae Lim		Zanashir Taznaa	
Jerusalem	Kuse	Jerusalem	Kuse	Jerusalem	Kuse
115	113	116	112	116	112

== Fight card ==
Confirmed bouts:

Post-broadcast matches
Weight class				Method	Round	Time	Notes
Super bantamweight	(Philippines) Jubert Buhat	vs.	(Philippines) Ariel Antimaro		– (8)
Super flyweight	(Philippines) Kenneth Albino	vs.	(Philippines) Adrian Dulayba		– (6)
Main card (IBA Boxing)
Weight class				Method	Round	Time	Notes
Mini-flyweight	(Philippines) Melvin Jerusalem (c)	def.	(South Africa) Siyakholwa Kuse	UD	12	3:00	(Note: For WBC mini-flyweight title)
Middleweight	(Philippines) Eumir Marcial	def.	(Venezuela) Eddy Colmenares	MD	10	3:00	(Note: For vacant WBC International middleweight title)
Super bantamweight	(Philippines) Carl Jammes Martin	def.	(Thailand) Aran Dipaen	UD	10	3:00
Heavyweight	(South Africa) Chris Thompson	def.	(Russia) Georgiy Yunovidov	UD	8	3:00	(Note: For vacant IBA Intercontinental heavyweight title; Manny Pacquiao was the person to award the IBA Intercontinental title to Thompson.)
Middleweight	(United States) Nico Ali Walsh	draw	(Thailand) Kittisak Klinson	MD	8	3:00
Middleweight	(Russia) Vadim Tukov	def.	(United States) Sena Agbeko	UD	8	3:00	(Note: For vacant IBA Intercontinental middleweight title)
Super bantamweight	(Philippines) Marlon Tapales	def.	(Venezuela) Fernando Toro	KO	6/8	2:31
Light flyweight	(Philippines) Arvin Magramo (c)	def.	(Philippines) Berland Robles	SD	10	3:00	(Note: For WBC International light flyweight title)
Lightweight	(Philippines) Ronerick Ballesteros	def.	(Philippines) Speedy Boy Acope	TKO	5/8	0:50	(Note: For inaugural GAB Youth lightweight title)
Flyweight	(Philippines) Albert Francisco	draw	(Philippines) Ramel Macado Jr.	SD	8	3:00	(Note: For vacant WBC International Silver flyweight title)
Lightweight	(Philippines) Eman Bacosa Pacquiao	def.	(Philippines) Nico Salado	UD	6	3:00

== See also ==
- History of boxing in the Philippines
- Thrilla in Manila II Countdown

Preceded by vs Yudai Shigeoka	Melvin Jerusalem's bouts 29 October 2025	Succeeded by vs Siyakholwa Kuse
Preceded by vs Samuel Salva	Siyakholwa Kuse's bouts 29 October 2025	Succeeded by vs Melvin Jerusalem
