= Łukasz Różański =

Polish boxer (born 1986)

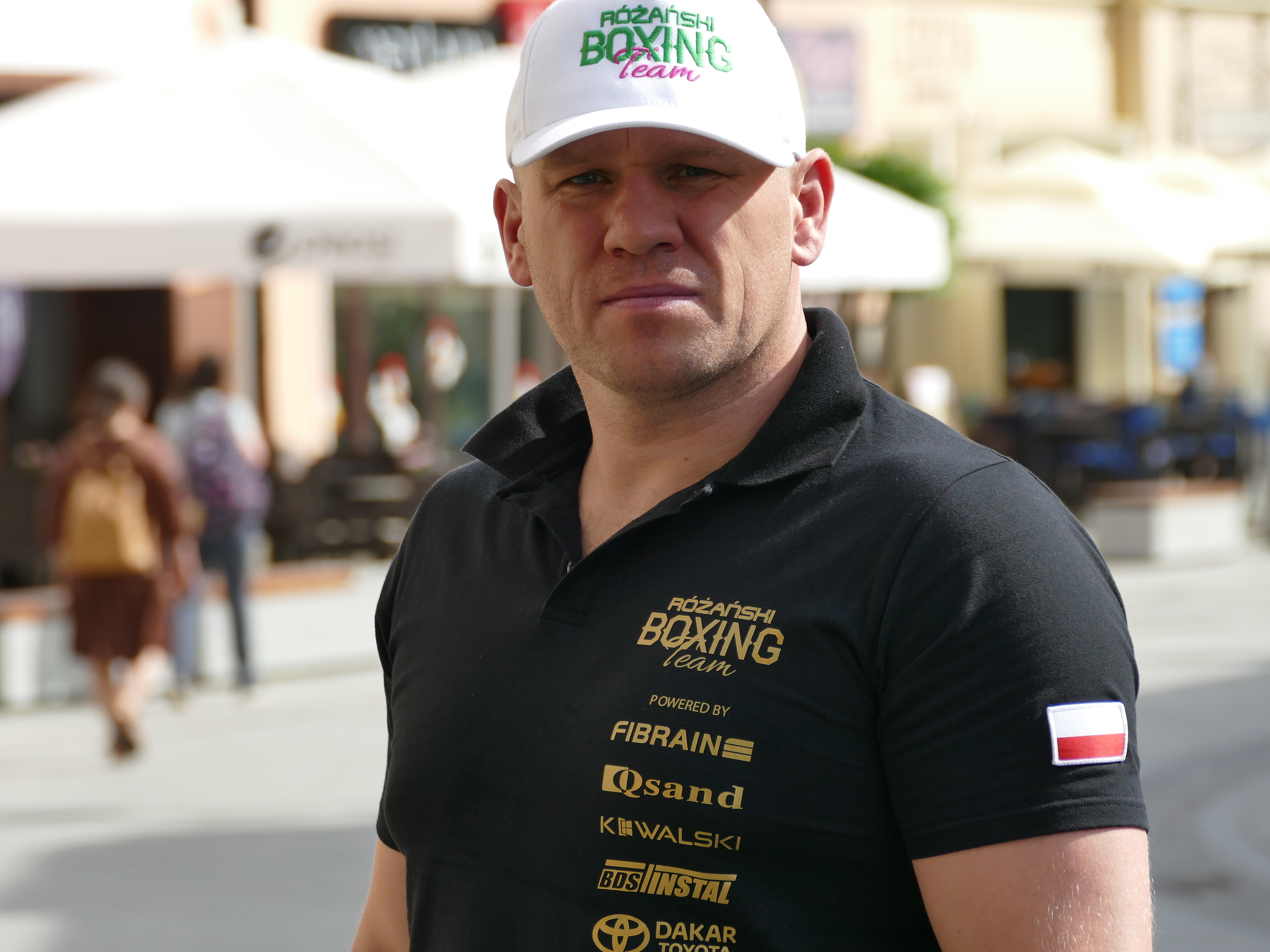
- Łukasz Różański in 2021

Personal information
- Born: 23 January 1986 (age 40) Rzeszów, Poland
- Height: 1.86 m (6 ft 1 in)
- Weight: Bridgerweight; Heavyweight

Boxing career
- Reach: 188 cm (74 in)
- Stance: Orthodox

Boxing record
- Total fights: 16
- Wins: 15
- Win by KO: 14
- Losses: 1

Łukasz Różański (born 23 January 1986) is a Polish professional boxer. He held the World Boxing Council (WBC) bridgerweight title from 2023 to 2024

== Professional career ==
=== WBC bridgerweight champion ===
==== Rozanski vs. Babic ====
On April 22, 2023 in Rzeszów, Poland, Rozanski defeated Alen Babic via first-round TKO to land the vacant WBC bridgerweight title.

==== Rozanski vs. Okolie ====
On May 24, 2024 in Rzeszów, Poland, Rozanski was defeated by Lawrence Okolie via first-round TKO resulting in loss of the World Boxing Council (WBC) bridgerweight title.

== Professional boxing record ==
16 fights	15 wins	1 loss
By knockout	14	1
By decision	1	0

No.	Result	Record	Opponent	Type	Round, time	Date	Location	Notes
16	Loss	15–1	Lawrence Okolie	TKO	1 (12), 2:47	24 May 2024	Hala Podpromie, Rzeszów, Poland	Lost WBC bridgerweight title
15	Win	15–0	Alen Babic	TKO	1 (12), 2:10	22 Apr 2023	G2A Arena, Rzeszów, Poland	Won vacant WBC bridgerweight title
14	Win	14–0	Artur Szpilka	KO	1 (10), 2:25	30 May 2021	Hala Podpromie, Rzeszów, Poland	Won vacant WBC International bridgerweight title
13	Win	13–0	Ozcan Cetinkaya	TKO	2 (6), 1:30	19 Sep 2020	Arena Jaskółka, Tarnów, Poland	
12	Win	12–0	Eriks Kalasnikovs	TKO	2 (6), 1:18	20 Jun 2020	Hotel Arłamów, Arłamów, Poland	
11	Win	11–0	Izuagbe Ugonoh	KO	4 (10), 2:16	6 Jul 2019	Stadion Miejski, Rzeszów, Poland	
10	Win	10–0	Eugen Buchmueller	TKO	1 (6), 2:46	10 Nov 2018	Arena Gliwice, Gliwice, Poland	
9	Win	9–0	Michael Sprott	TKO	2 (6), 0:24	2 Jun 2018	G2A Arena, Rzeszów, Poland	
8	Win	8–0	Andras Csomor	TKO	2 (6), 1:16	10 Feb 2018	Hala Nysa, Nysa, Poland	
7	Win	7–0	Albert Sosnowski	KO	1 (8), 2:00	9 Sep 2017	Stadion Lekkoatletyczno-Piłkarski, Radom, Poland	
6	Win	6–0	Marko Colic	KO	2 (6), 2:47	22 Apr 2017	Arena Legionowo, Legionowo, Poland	
5	Win	5–0	Laszlo Toth	TKO	1 (4), 2:32	25 Feb 2017	Netto Arena, Szczecin, Poland	
4	Win	4–0	Sandor Balogh	KO	1 (4), 0:51	22 Oct 2016	Kopalnia Soli, Wieliczka, Poland	
3	Win	3–0	Bartosz Szwarczynski	TKO	1 (6), 2:35	21 May 2016	Ring 3 City, Gdańsk, Poland	
2	Win	2–0	Artsiom Charniakevich	UD	4	27 Nov 2015	Hala Podpromie, Rzeszów, Poland	
1	Win	1–0	Mateusz Zielinski	KO	1 (4), 0:59	17 Oct 2015	Kopalnia Soli, Wieliczka, Poland	

Vacant Title last held by Óscar Rivas	WBC bridgerweight champion 22 Apr 2023 – 24 May 2024	Succeeded by Lawrence Okolie
