= Dillon Carman =

Canadian boxer and reality television personality (born 1986)

Personal information
- Nickname: Big Country
- Born: Dillon Robert Carman; 15 June 1986 (age 40) Belleville, Ontario, Canada
- Height: 6 ft 5 in (196 cm)
- Weight: Heavyweight

Boxing career
- Reach: 80 in (203 cm)
- Stance: Orthodox

Boxing record
- Total fights: 20
- Wins: 14
- Win by KO: 13
- Losses: 6

Dillon Carman (born 15 June 1986) is a Canadian former professional boxer and reality television personality. He held the WBC Francophone and NABA heavyweight titles in 2018 and was Canadian heavyweight champion from October 2014 to December 2017.

== Professional career ==
A professional boxer since 2011, Carman won the vacant Canadian heavyweight title by stopping Eric Martel Bahoeli in the seventh round at the Mattamy Events Center in Toronto on 25 October 2014.

He made the first defense of his title against Donovan "Razor" Ruddock at the Ricoh Coliseum in Toronto on 11 September 2015, knocking out his 51-year-old opponent in the third round.

Carman lost the title in his next defense, suffering a second round stoppage defeat to his former training partner, Mladen Miljas, at the Scotiabank Convention Centre in Niagara Falls on 1 December 2017.

On 6 October 2018, he challenged WBC Francophone heavyweight champion Simon Kean at the Videotron Centre in Quebec City in a contest where the vacant NABA heavyweight title was also on the line. Carman won via knockout in the fourth round.

In his next outing, he fought outside Canada for the first, and only, time in his career, taking on Evgenyi Romanov for the inaugural WBO Global heavyweight title at the KRK “Uralets” in Ekaterinburg, Russia, on 22 February 2019. Carman was knocked out inside the first two minutes of the opening round.

He faced Simon Kean at Centre Gervais Auto in Shawinigan on 15 June 2019, in a rematch of their fight from the previous year. This time the roles were reversed and Carman lost by stoppage in the third round.

After 16 months away from the competitive boxing ring, Carman had what turned out to be his final professional contest on 10 October 2020, when he returned to the Centre Gervais Auto in Shawinigan to challenge unbeaten NABF heavyweight champion Arslanbek Makhmudov. He was knocked to the canvas within seconds of the bout getting underway and, although he got back to his feet, the referee decided he was not fit to continue and waived the fight off with the official stoppage time being 27 seconds.

== Reality television appearances ==
Carman appeared on the 10th season of Dragons' Den broadcast on CBC Television in 2015, during which he pitched the idea of $50,000 in exchange for five per cent of all future earnings in his boxing career and received backing from three of the investors.

He was a contestant on season five of Big Brother Canada in 2017, being evicted from the show on day 62 to finish fifth out of 16 participants.

== Professional boxing record ==
20 fights	14 wins	6 losses
By knockout	13	5
By decision	1	1

No.	Result	Record	Opponent	Type	Round, time	Date	Location	Notes
20	Loss	14–6	Arslanbek Makhmudov	TKO	1 (10), 0:27	10 Oct 2020	Centre Gervais Auto, Shawinigan, Quebec, Canada	For NABF heavyweight title
19	Loss	14–5	Simon Kean	TKO	3 (10), 2:56	15 Jun 2019	Centre Gervais Auto, Shawinigan, Quebec, Canada	
18	Loss	14–4	Evgenyi Romanov	KO	1 (10), 1:53	22 Feb 2019	KRK "Uralets", Ekaterinburg, Russia	For inaugural WBO Global heavyweight title
17	Win	14–3	Simon Kean	KO	4 (12), 1:28	6 Oct 2018	Videotron Centre Quebec City, Quebec, Canada	For WBC Francophone heavyweight title and vacant NABA heavyweight title
16	Win	13–3	Carlos Antonio Carreon Hernandez	KO	5 (6), 0:43	5 May 2018	Miramichi Civic Center, Miramichi, New Brunswick, Canada	
15	Loss	12–3	Mladen Miljas	TKO	2 (8), 1:21	1 Dec 2017	Scotiabank Convention Centre in Niagara Falls, Ontario, Canada	Lost Canadian heavyweight title
14	Win	12–2	Vicente Sandez	KO	2 (10), 0:36	29 Dec 2016	Deerfoot Inn and Casino, Calgary, Alberta, Canada	
13	Win	11–2	Orlando Antonio Farias	KO	1 (10), 0:38	15 Oct 2016	Aitken Centre, Fredericton, New Brunswick, Canada	
12	Win	10–2	Julien Collette	TKO	1 (10), 2:38	6 Aug 2016	Lebrun Arena, Bedford, Nova Scotia, Canada	
11	Win	9–2	Donovan Ruddock	KO	3 (8), 2:05	11 Sep 2015	Ricoh Coliseum, Toronto, Ontario, Canada	Retained Canadian heavyweight title
10	Win	8–2	Benito Quiroz	TKO	8 (8), 3:00	27 Mar 2015	Olympia Theatre, Montreal, Quebec, Canada	
9	Win	7–2	Eric Martel Bahoeli	TKO	7 (8), 2:46	25 Oct 2014	Mattamy Events Center, Toronto, Ontario, Canada	Won vacant Canadian heavyweight title
8	Win	6–2	Sylvera Louis	TKO	1 (6), 2:28	30 Nov 2013	Hershey Centre, Mississauga, Ontario, Canada	
7	Loss	5–2	Sylvera Louis	TKO	5 (6), 1:26	1 Jun 2013	Hershey Centre, Mississauga, Ontario, Canada	
6	Win	5–1	Peter Erdos	TKO	3 (6), 0:55	1 Dec 2012	Hershey Centre, Mississauga, Ontario, Canada	
5	Win	4–1	Alain Kashama	TKO	2 (4), 1:26	8 Sep 2012	Hershey Centre, Mississauga, Ontario, Canada	
4	Win	3–1	Matt White	TKO	3 (4), 2:27	12 May 2012	Hershey Centre, Mississauga, Ontario, Canada	
3	Loss	2–1	Chukwunoso Okafor	UD	4	6 Mar 2012	Hilton Hotel, Toronto, Ontario, Canada	
2	Win	2–0	Gord Franjic	TKO	1 (4), 0:39	22 Oct 2011	Hershey Centre, Mississauga, Ontario, Canada	
1	Win	1–0	Sergio Romano	UD	4	24 Jun 2011	Hershey Centre, Mississauga, Ontario, Canada	

Sporting positions
Regional boxing titles
Vacant Title last held by Neven Pajkić	Canadian heavyweight champion 25 October 2014 – 1 December 2017	Succeeded by Mladen Miljas
