= Realty One Group =

California real estate brokerage and franchising company

Realty ONE Group
- Company type: Privately Held Company
- Industry: Real Estate
- Founded: 2005
- Founder: Kuba Jewgieniew
- Headquarters: Laguna Niguel, California, United States
- Number of locations: 400+ in the United States, Canada, Costa Rica, Singapore, Spain, Italy, Portugal, Ecuador, Bolivia,
- Key people: Kuba Jewgieniew Founder and CEO; Vinnie Tracey (President)
- Products: Realty ONE franchises, ONE LUXE
- Number of employees: 18,000+
- Website: www.realtyonegroup.com

Realty ONE Group is a Laguna Niguel, California-based real-estate brokerage and franchising company. As of 2022, it is affiliated with over 19,500 real estate professionals in over 400 offices across the United States and Canada.

== History ==
The group was founded in Las Vegas in 2005 by Kuba Jewgieniew, who was a former stockbroker. In 2007, the company expanded into Arizona. By August 2010, it had also expanded into California, and had 2,200 agents.

In August 2011 the brokerage acquired John Hall & Associates, a Phoenix, Arizona-based real estate brokerage.

In May 2012, the company acquired Southern California-based brokerage eVantage Home Realty. In August, it opened an affiliate program in order to franchise locations.

In June 2020, the company introduced a luxury brand to promote high end properties worth over $1 million.
