= Nico Ali Walsh =

American boxer (born 2000)

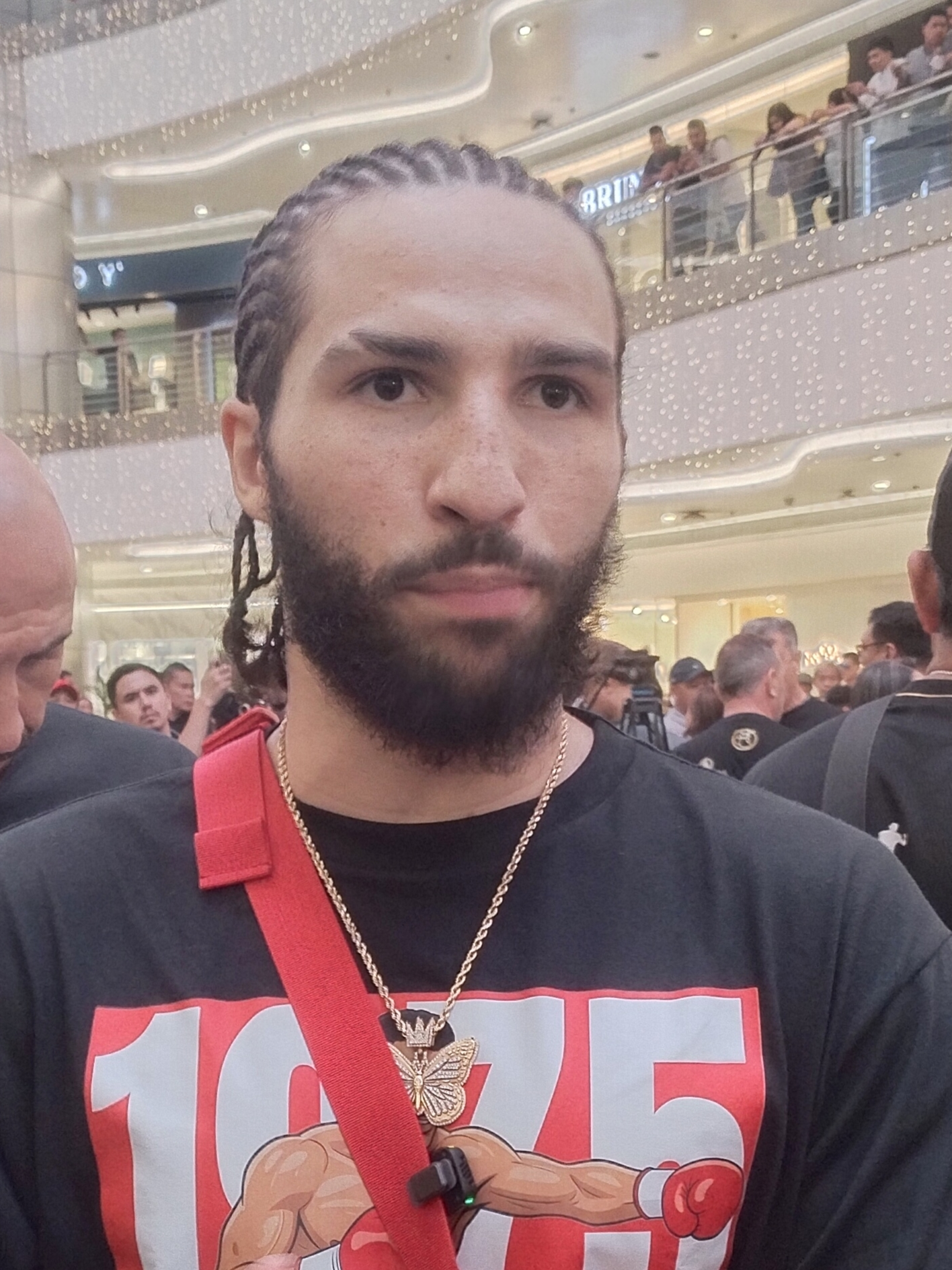
- Ali Walsh in 2025

Personal information
- Nickname: "The Legend Lives On"
- Nationality: American
- Born: Nico Ali Walsh; July 11, 2000 (age 26) Chicago, U.S.
- Height: 6 ft 0 in (183 cm)
- Weight: Middleweight
- Website: nicoaliwalsh.com

Boxing career
- Reach: 74 in (188 cm)
- Stance: Orthodox

Boxing record
- Total fights: 17
- Wins: 13
- Win by KO: 5
- Losses: 3
- Draws: 1
- No contests: 1

Nico Ali Walsh (born July 11, 2000) is an American professional boxer. The grandson of Muhammad Ali, Walsh came into the ring for his pro debut in August 2021 wearing his grandfather's personal white Everlast shorts, which were passed down to him in 2016 with the death of his grandfather.

== Professional career ==
Before going pro in 2021, Ali Walsh spent a few months training alongside world-renowned boxing trainer, Abel Sanchez, in Big Bear Lake, California. After having a "limited" amateur boxing career of approximately 30 bouts, Walsh decided to turn pro in early 2021. He began working with Tyson Fury's current trainer, SugarHill Steward, and is promoted by Bob Arum's Top Rank, who also promoted 27 of his grandfather's fights.

Walsh made his professional debut against Jordan Weeks on the Joshua Franco vs. Andrew Moloney III undercard, on August 14, 2021. He won the fight by a first-round technical knockout. Walsh was booked to face James Westley II, in his second professional bout, on October 23, 2021, on the undercard of the WBO super featherweight championship between Shakur Stevenson and Jamel Herring. He won the fight by a third-round technical knockout. Walsh faced Reyes Sanchez on December 11, 2021, on the undercard of Vasyl Lomachenko vs Richard Commey. In his final fight of the year, He won the fight by a majority decision, with scores of 40–36, 38–38 and 39–37.

Walsh faced Jeremiah Yeager on January 29, 2022, on the undercard of the WBC super featherweight title eliminator between Robson Conceição and Xavier Martinez. He won the fight by a second-round technical knockout.

Walsh faced Alejandro Ibarra on April 30, 2022, on the undercard of the WBC and WBO super featherweight unification between Shakur Stevenson and Óscar Valdez. He won the fight via 1st-round knockout. Walsh also said he hoped to stay active and fight again before he hit a year in professional boxing.

Walsh fought again against Reyes Sanchez as Walsh did not like how he performed against him, as he thought the fight was close (one of the judges thought the fight was a draw, resulting in a majority decision). Walsh knocked out Reyes Sanchez in the second round at Pechanga Arena in San Diego, California.

=== Thrilla in Manila: The 50th Anniversary ===
In August 2025, Walsh was announced to be participating in the commemorative event billed as "Thrilla in Manila: the 50th Anniversary" or "Thrilla in Manila II" that commemorates the historic Thrilla in Manila clash between Walsh's grandfather Muhammad Ali and Joe Frazier. He boxed to a majority draw against Thai boxer Kittisak Klinson on October 29, 2025, at Araneta Coliseum in Quezon City, Philippines.

== Professional boxing record ==
17 fights	13 wins	2 losses
By knockout	5	0
By decision	8	2
Draws	1	
No contests	1	

No.	Result	Record	Opponent	Type	Round, time	Date	Location	Notes
18	Loss	13–3–1 (1)	Treavon Craycraft	UD	8	Oct 10, 2026	Memorial Hall, Kansas City, Kansas, U.S.	
17	Win	13–2–1 (1)	Jeremiah Sserwadda	UD	6	Dec 12, 2025	Dubai Duty Free Tennis Stadium, Dubai, U.A.E.	
16	Draw	12–2–1 (1)	Kittisak Klinson	MD	8	Oct 29, 2025	Araneta Coliseum, Quezon City, Philippines	
15	Win	12–2 (1)	Ebenezer Sowah	UD	8	May 10, 2025	Sipopo Conference Center, Malabo, Equatorial Guinea	
14	Loss	11–2 (1)	Juan Carlos Guerra Jr.	UD	6	Feb 14, 2025	The Theater at Madison Square Garden, New York City, New York, U.S.	
13	Win	11–1 (1)	Sona Akale	UD	6	Jun 29, 2024	James L. Knight Center, Miami, Florida, U.S.	
12	Win	10–1 (1)	Charles Stanford	UD	6	Mar 2, 2024	Turning Stone Resort Casino, Verona, New York, U.S.	
11	Win	9–1 (1)	Noël Lafargue	SD	6	Dec 16, 2023	Palais du Peuple, Conakry, Guinea	
10	Loss	8–1 (1)	Sona Akale	MD	6	Aug 16, 2023	Hard Rock Hotel & Casino, Tulsa, Oklahoma, U.S.	
9	NC	8–0 (1)	Danny Rosenberger	NC	6	May 20, 2023	MGM Grand Garden Arena, Las Vegas, Nevada, U.S.	Originally a split decision draw: Overturned due to Rosenberger testing positive for illegal substance
8	Win	8–0	Eduardo Ayala	UD	6	Feb 3, 2023	Desert Diamond Arena, Glendale, Arizona, U.S.	
7	Win	7–0	Billy Wagner	UD	6	Oct 29, 2022	Madison Square Garden, New York City, U.S.	
6	Win	6–0	Reyes Sanchez	KO	2 (4), 2:45	Aug 20, 2022	Pechanga Arena, San Diego, California, U.S.	
5	Win	5–0	Alejandro Ibarra	KO	1 (4), 2:50	Apr 30, 2022	MGM Grand Garden Arena, Las Vegas, Nevada, U.S.	
4	Win	4–0	Jeremiah Yeager	TKO	2 (4), 2:33	Jan 29, 2022	Hard Rock Hotel & Casino, Tulsa, Oklahoma, U.S.	
3	Win	3–0	Reyes Sanchez	MD	4	Dec 11, 2021	Madison Square Garden, New York City, U.S.	
2	Win	2–0	James Westley II	TKO	3 (4), 0:30	Oct 23, 2021	State Farm Arena, Atlanta, U.S.	
1	Win	1–0	Jordan Weeks	TKO	1 (4), 1:49	Aug 14, 2021	Hard Rock Hotel & Casino, Tulsa, Oklahoma, U.S.	

== Personal life ==
Walsh is a Muslim. He is a grandson of Muhammad Ali and nephew of Laila Ali.

Walsh saw the tough time that both Muhammad and Laila Ali had while boxing and debated whether or not to follow in their footsteps. In the end it was his grandfather that kept him involved with the sport.
