= Eman Bacosa Pacquiao =

Filipino boxer (born 2004)

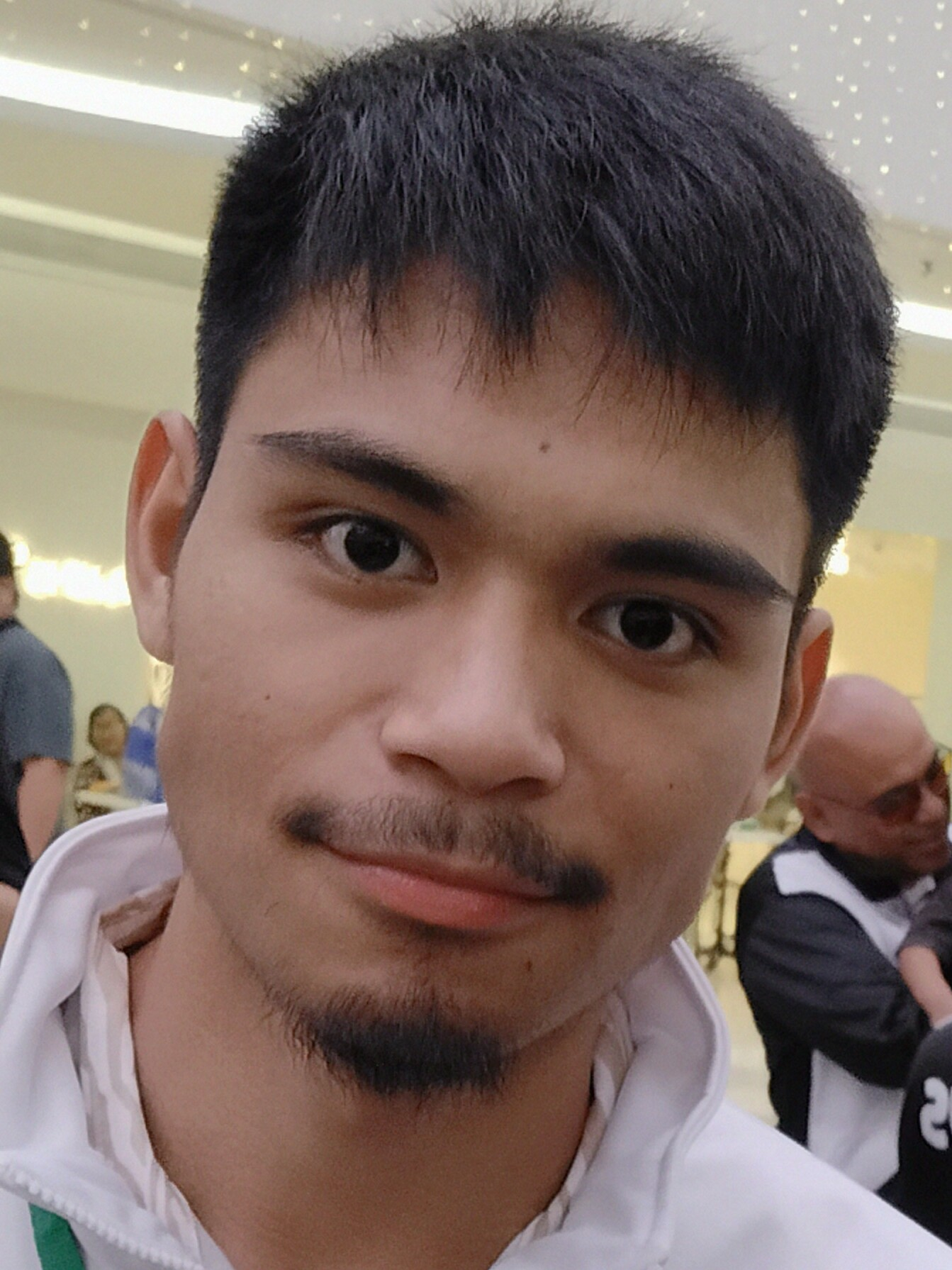
- Bacosa Pacquiao in 2025

Personal information
- Nickname: Eman
- Nationality: Filipino
- Born: Emmanuel Joseph Bacosa; January 2, 2004 (age 22) Tagum, Davao del Norte, Philippines
- Height: 1.78 m (5 ft 10 in)
- Weight: Lightweight

Boxing career
- Reach: 188 cm (74 in)
- Stance: Orthodox

Boxing record
- Total fights: 11
- Wins: 8
- Win by KO: 5
- Losses: 2
- Draws: 1

Emmanuel Joseph Bacosa Pacquiao (born Emmanuel Joseph Bacosa; January 2, 2004) is a Filipino professional boxer. He is the son of former boxer and politician Manny Pacquiao.

== Early and personal life ==
Emmanuel "Eman" Joseph Bacosa Pacquiao was born on January 2, 2004. He was born from a relationship between eight-division world champion boxer Manny Pacquiao and Joanna Rose Bacosa, who worked as a karaoke bar receptionist. Eman was primarily raised by his mother. Joanna Rose stated that she and Pacquiao, who was a regular guest at the bar she worked at in Malate, Manila, had a relationship in April 2003. Three weeks after Eman was born, Joanna Rose stated that Pacquiao would still call her from time to time but stopped giving financial assistance. In 2006, Joanna Rose disclosed the existence of her son, wanting child support. She later claimed that Pacquiao threatened to kidnap their son if she refused to stay quiet.

Bacosa began boxing at nine years old after being influenced by watching his father's matches, primarily the Manny Pacquiao vs. Shane Mosley bout. He was bullied as a child due to being his father's illegitimate child; to gain experience, he joined a boxing match in Tagum against one of his school bullies for three rounds in which he won ₱200. Growing up, Bacosa understood why he and his mother Joanna Rose couldn't live with his father. He and his father would later have a heart-to-heart talk where Pacquiao would apologize to him, which Bacosa accepted.

At 12 years old, Bacosa moved to Japan, where he studied, trained, and continued practicing boxing with the support of his mother and his stepfather "Papa" Sultan, who helped him train. After returning to the Philippines, he asked help from his father to further his boxing career, to which Pacquiao formally legalized him as his son and granted him his surname. He has since stated that he has grown a good relationship with his stepmother Jinkee. Like his father, he is a Christian.

== Professional career ==
=== Early career ===
==== Debut ====
On September 23, 2023, in a Manny Pacquiao Presents: Blow by Blow, Bacosa Pacquiao made his debut against 0–1 Jommel Cudiamat at the Mandaluyong College of Science and Technology Gymnasium, Mandaluyong, Philippines. The bout would go the full distance and end in a split draw (38–38, 39–37 and 37–39).

==== Bacosa vs. Pangantao ====
In his next bout on December 15, 2023, in General Santos, Bacosa Pacquiao was scheduled against Noel Pangantao in a 4-rounder bout with his father Manny Pacquiao watching at ringside. This served as Bacosa Pacquiao's first public appearance with his father after reconciling a year prior. Bacosa Pacquiao delivered a praiseworthy first-round stoppage, stopping his foe in only 32 seconds. Bacosa Pacquiao would later go ringside, embraced and kissed his father Manny, ultimately dedicating the impressive win to Pacquiao. The bout was also just two days before Pacquiao's birthday celebration.

==== Thrilla in Manila: The 50th Anniversary ====
Bacosa Pacquiao would build a credible record of 6–1–1 with 4 knockouts before being able to participate in the 26th annual Manny Pacquiao Presents: Blow by Blow and major Philippine boxing event Thrilla in Manila II on October 29, 2025, that commemorates the Thrilla in Manila event between Muhammad Ali and Joe Frazier back on October 1, 1975. Bacosa Pacquiao was scheduled against 2–1–1, 1 knockout Nico Salado. Bacosa Pacquiao would drop the other man twice en route to a deserved 6-rounds unanimous decision, (58–55 twice and 60–53), as their match was also the opener of the event with Pacquiao as one of the organizers watching at ringside.

== Professional boxing record ==
11 fights	8 wins	2 losses
By knockout	5	0
By decision	3	2
Draws	1	

No.	Result	Record	Opponent	Type	Round, time	Date	Location	Notes
11	Loss	8–2–1	Rodelyn Perez	MD	8	Jun 21, 2026	DRP Sports Complex, Muntinlupa, Philippines	For inaugural PBF Youth lightweight title
10	Win	8–1–1	Reynold Kundimang	KO	4 (8), 2:26	Feb 28, 2026	Bohol Cultural Center, Tagbilaran, Philippines	
9	Win	7–1–1	Nico Salado	UD	6	Oct 29, 2025	Araneta Coliseum, Quezon City, Philippines	
8	Win	6–1–1	Arnaud Darius Makita	UD	6	Mar 20, 2025	Okada Manila Hotel and Casino, Parañaque, Philippines	
7	Win	5–1–1	Rodelyn Perez	MD	6	Oct 20, 2024	Okada Manila Hotel and Casino, Parañaque, Philippines	
6	Win	4–1–1	Reyjun Arquita	TKO	3 (6), 2:34	Aug 26, 2024	Almendras Gym, Davao City, Philippines	
5	Win	3–1–1	Jay Clyde Langahin	TKO	3 (4), 1:00	Mar 24, 2024	Okada Manila Hotel and Casino, Parañaque, Philippines	
4	Win	2–1–1	Jerson Baclohan	TKO	3 (4), 0:45	Feb 9, 2024	City of Passi Arena, Passi, Philippines	
3	Win	1–1–1	Noel Pangantao	TKO	1 (4), 0:32	Dec 15, 2023	Oval Plaza Gym, General Santos, Philippines	
2	Draw	0–1–1	Jommel Cudiamat	SD	4	Sep 23, 2023	Mandaluyong College of Science and Technology Gymnasium, Mandaluyong, Philippines	
1	Loss	0–1	Hiromi Tsutsui	UD	4	Jul 18, 2021	Aioi Hall, Kariya, Japan	

== Entertainment career ==
On November 19, 2025, Bacosa Pacquiao signed with and officially became part of GMA's Sparkle Artist Center, with the intent of pursuing an entertainment career. Upon signing with Sparkle, he adopted the Pacquiao surname publicly for the first time, after previously going by merely his mother's surname.
