= Bridgerweight =

Weight class in professional boxing

Bridgerweight, also known as super cruiserweight, is a weight class in professional boxing used by the World Boxing Council (WBC) since 2020 and was formerly used by the World Boxing Association (WBA) from 2023 until 2026. The division is for boxers weighing between 200 pounds (91 kg; 14 st 4 lb) and 224 pounds (102 kg; 16 st 0 lb). The weight is named after six-year-old American Bridger Walker, who saved his four-year-old sister from a stray dog in July 2020.

== History ==
After presenting Bridger Walker with a championship belt and naming him an "Honorary Champion" in July 2020, the WBC announced the establishment of bridgerweight four months later on November 9. It sits between the WBC's cruiserweight and heavyweight divisions. WBC president Mauricio Sulaimán said of the decision to create the new weight: "We have decided to create a new division called Bridger, as it is the bridge necessary to serve the large number of boxers who are between 200 and 224-pounds. This name is inspired by that hero of humanity, that six-year-old boy who heroically saved his four-year-old sister from an attack by a wild dog during the pandemic; yes, this new division is inspired by Bridger Walker."

The WBC intended to reduce the lower limit for the weight class to 190 pounds (86 kg; 13 st 8 lb), lowering the upper limit for cruiserweight accordingly, within "six months or one year" of the November 2020 announcement. This would move the cruiserweight limit out of line with the other major sanctioning organisations.

In December 2020, the WBC announced the first set of rankings for the new division, with Óscar Rivas at #1.

The first fight took place on April 3, 2021 with Geovany Bruzon defeating Jose German Garcia Montes by eight-round technical decision to win the WBC Latino title.

The inaugural world championship fight took place on October 22 between Oscar Rivas and Ryan Rozicki, with Rivas winning via twelve-round unanimous decision.

On 5 January 2023 the WBC declared its bridgerweight (224-pound) championship to be vacant. The first, and only champion, Oscar Rivas had, according to the WBC, suffered a detached retina, and his future was uncertain. The WBC intended to order a series of fights to fill the vacant title and set the mandatories for the new champion.

On 22 April 2023, Lukasz Rozanski claimed the vacant WBC bridgerweight title with a devastating first-round stoppage of Alen Babic in Poland. Rozanski had not boxed for nearly two years but set about Babic from the opening bell and dropped him within 90 seconds after hurting ‘The Savage’ with a left hook and putting him over with a numbing right hand. The Croatian beat the count easily but was swiftly overwhelmed by the 37-year-old and was against the ropes shipping heavy punishment when the referee stepped in to end the contest after 2:10 of the first.

In August 2023, Misfits Boxing announced that the bridgerweight weight class would be included in their official weight divisions with a 205 Ibs limit. The World Boxing Association announced a new 224-pound super cruiserweight division to be introduced in December 2023. By the time the division was introduced it was given the "bridgerweight" name. Evgeny Tishchenko defeated Leon Harth on 9 December 2023 to become the inaugural WBA World Bridgerweight champion but was subsequently stripped after testing positive for a banned substance. Julio César La Cruz was awarded the WBA gold championship on 16 December 2023.

On 24 May 2024 Lawrence Okolie stopped Lukasz Rozanski in the first round to claim the WBC bridgerweight title.

On 12 July 2024, Muslim Gadzhimagomedov became the first official WBA bridgerweight world champion with a 4th round stoppage of Zhaoxin Zhang.

== Reception ==
Editor-in-chief of The Ring, Doug Fischer, said in November 2020 when asked if the magazine would recognise the new weight class that "I’ll pose (the question) to the Ring Ratings Panel. For the time being, however, the answer is no. It’s brand new and the WBC has yet to arrange a bout for their inaugural title. But if the WBC is able to put together a credible top 10-25 of small heavyweights that are cool with being ranked as ‘Bridgerweights’ and if the concept catches on with the other major sanctioning organizations, who knows? Maybe we’ll have to recognize it.” Deontay Wilder, who has fought within the bridgerweight limits for much of his career, said that he was not interested in fighting at the weight.

As of December 2023, the International Boxing Federation and World Boxing Organization have not adopted the new weight class. The International Boxing Association, a lightly-regarded minor sanctioning organization, has a similar weight class named super cruiserweight for boxers weighing between 190 pounds (86 kg; 13 st 8 lb) and 210 pounds (95 kg; 15 st 0 lb).

On 30 June 2026, the WBA announced it would no longer recognize the bridgerweight division effective immediately. The organization announced that the move was part of their plan to "streamline its championship structure and strengthen the competitive landscape across weight classes", as well as its commitment to "building the strongest championship structure for modern day boxing". At the time, Muslim Gadzhimagomedov was the reigning WBA super champion while Vartan Arutyunyan was the regular champion; the WBA announced that both men would instead move into the WBA rankings in their normal weight classes, with Gadzhimagomedov moving into the cruiserweight class and Arutyunyan moving into the heavyweight class.

== List of champions ==
=== WBC ===
No.	Name	Date	Defenses
1	Óscar Rivas (def. Ryan Rozicki)	22 October 2021 – 5 January 2023	0
2	Łukasz Różański (def. Alen Babić)	22 April 2023 – 24 May 2024	0
3	Lawrence Okolie (def. Łukasz Różański)	24 May 2024 – 8 October 2024	0
4	Kevin Lerena (interim champion promoted)	8 October 2024 – 30 May 2026	1
5	Ryad Merhy (def. Kevin Lerena)	30 May 2026 – present	0

=== WBA ===
No.	Name	Date	Defenses
1	Muslim Gadzhimagomedov (def. Zhaoxin Zhang)	12 July 2024 – 30 June 2026	1
	WBA formally discontinued Bridgerweight		
