= Mano a Mano =

Mano a Mano, (a Spanish phrase, meaning literally “hand-to-hand”; on equal footing, neither of two participants having any distinct advantage, a head-on conflict or direct competition) may refer to:

- Mano-A-Mano, a professional boxing event between Manny Pacquiao and Óscar Larios
- Mano a Mano, an album by Grupo Bryndis
- Mano a Mano, a collaboration album by Luis Eduardo Aute and Silvio Rodríguez
- "Mano a Mano", a 2018 song by Salvador Sobral
- "Mano A Mano", a song by Hall & Oates from the 1981 album Private Eyes
- "A mano a mano", a 1978 song by Riccardo Cocciante

== See also ==
- Mano Mano (disambiguation)
