= History of boxing in the Philippines =

Boxing history in the Philippines

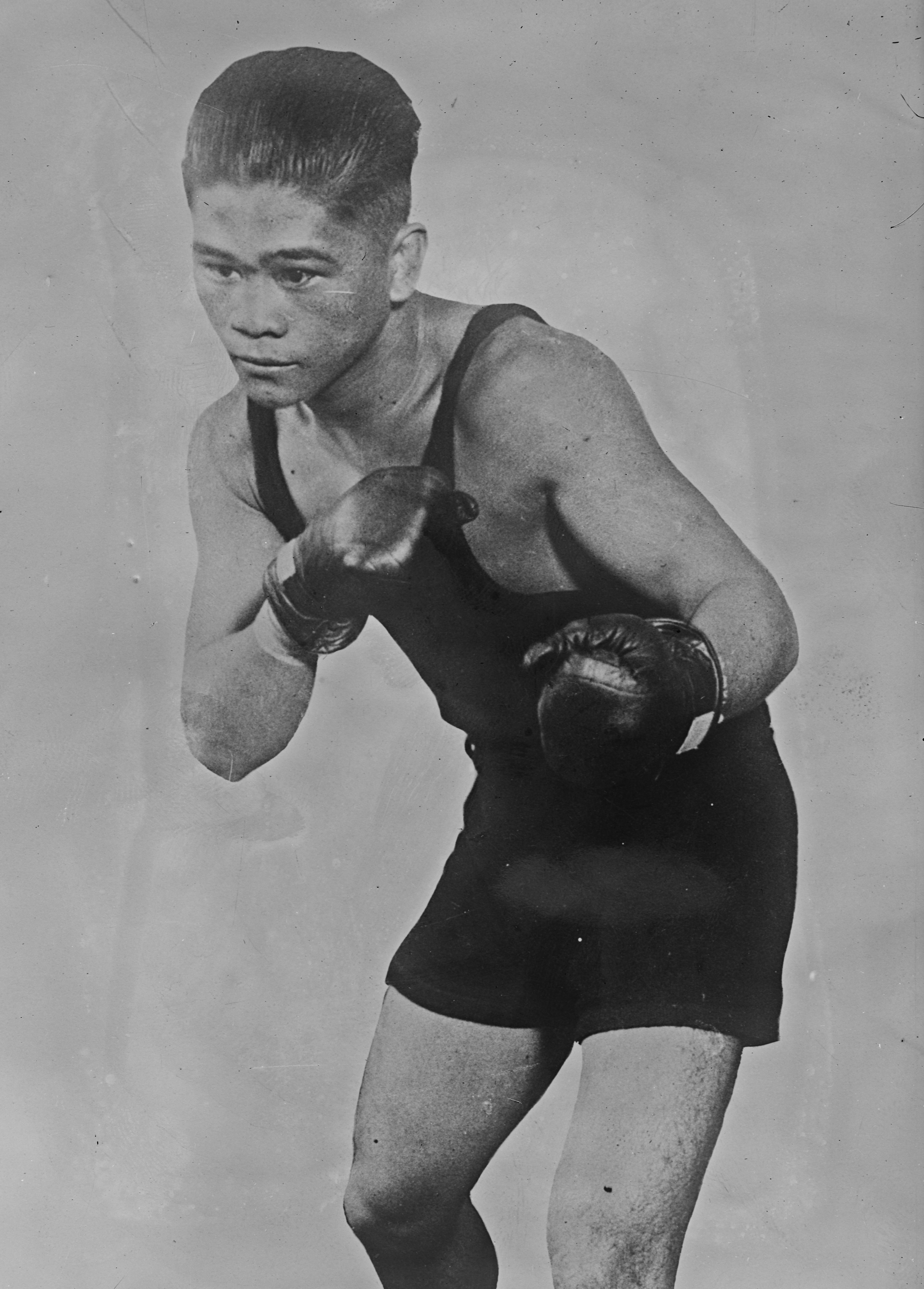
Pancho Villa: The first Asian world champion; June 18, 1923.

The history of boxing in the Philippines is the history of boxing and the evolution and progress of the sport in the Philippines. In the Philippines, boxing is one of its most popular sports, together with basketball, due to the many accolades it has brought to the country, having produced 46 major world champions (including those of Filipino heritage), one of the most in the world. Despite not having won a gold medal in boxing, the Philippines has had multiple Olympic standouts, with 10 out of its 18 total Olympic medals coming from boxing, along with some of the greatest fighters in the history of the sport. Filipino greats like Pancho Villa and Flash Elorde are members of the two highly respected boxing hall of fames – International Boxing Hall of Fame (IBHOF) and World Boxing Hall of Fame (WBHF) thus, giving the Philippines the most number of Boxing Hall of Famers outside the United States.

== Golden ages of Philippine boxing ==
Local folk narrative among martial arts circles claims that before the Spaniards and Americans came to the Philippines, Filipinos had their own kind of boxing known as suntukan,"bare-hand fighting" in Tagalog, (and similarly in other Philippine languages with the same meaning) generally believed to have evolved from sword and knife fighting techniques. During the Spanish colonization martial arts and fight sports were banned, so it was driven underground where the lack of swords, knives and rattan sticks led to fist fighting. Despite this claim, centuries old documents still need to be uncovered and translated for verification on whether or not the Philippine natives had a codified system of unarmed combat before boxing since there are no surviving reports and records of any kind of unarmed fighting in Luzon and Visayas practicing a system of empty-hand combat, apart only from local wrestling, as fighting only becomes a martial art if trainings are systematic and orderly, thus, "codified".

=== First golden age of Philippine boxing ===
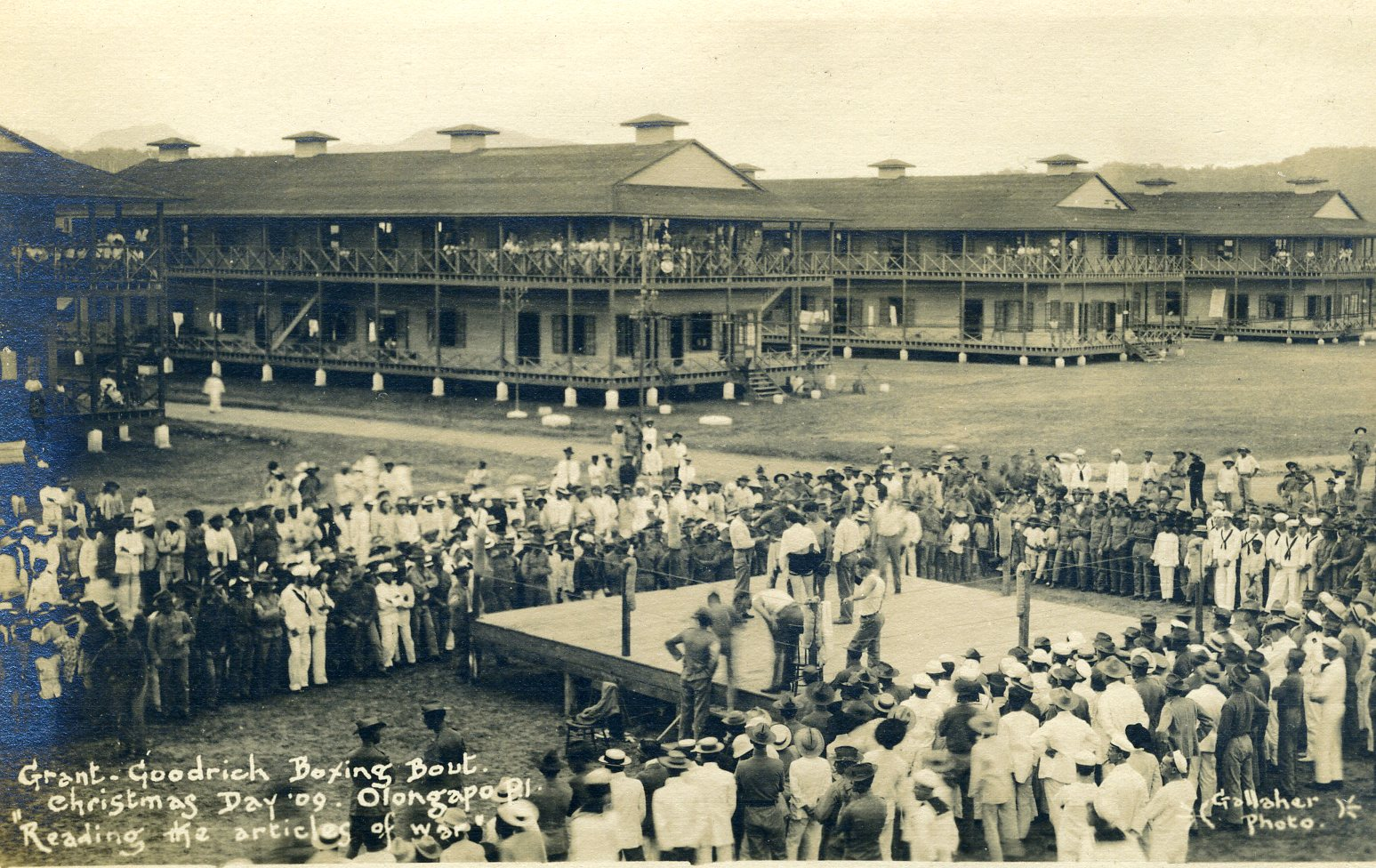
A boxing match in Olongapo in 1909.

The evolution of Philippine boxing began after when Spain ceded its colonial territories, namely Puerto Rico, Guam, and the Philippines to the United States as agreed in the Treaty of Paris on 1898 which led to the Philippine–American War on 1899. Some reports state U.S. soldiers brought modern boxing to the Philippines, evidenced by a pair boxing gloves made by Sol Levinson of San Francisco. Another story tells of a renegade soldier brought some boxing gloves to Filipino prisoners and taught them how to use them. However, it was generally believed that three Americans were responsible for the evolution of boxing in the country namely: Frank Churchill and the Tait brothers (Eddie and Stewart) Eddie and Stewart Tait, also dubbed as "Barnums of Borneo", were amusement park entrepreneurs who established carnivals and horse racing tracks in Manila, who arrived in the country in 1902. Eddie, believed to be a boxing enthusiast, wanted to attract crowds by teaching Filipino locals some western boxing lessons for free to create American-style Filipino boxers.

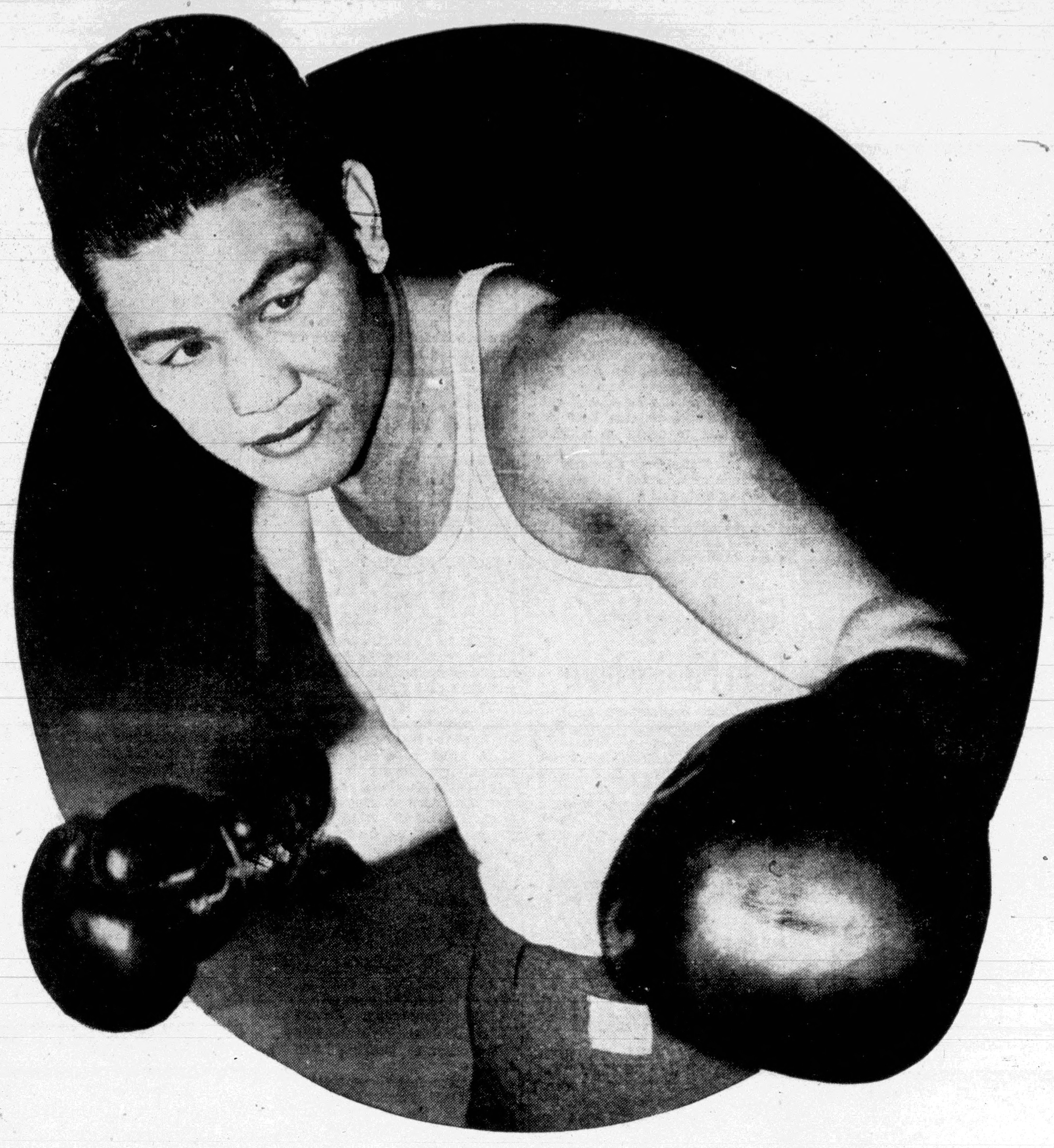
Ceferino Garcia: Middleweight world champion on 1939. Was credited to as the first well known user of the bolo punch.

In 1921, boxing was legalized in the Philippines and began to flourish. Frank Churchill joined by the Tait brothers, established the Olympic Boxing Club in Manila. During this time, the country saw the first batch of great Filipino fighters such as Dencio Cabanela, Speedy Dado, the Flores brothers (Francisco, Elino, Macario and Ireneo), Pete Sarmiento, Sylvino Jamito, Macario Villon and the legendary Pancho Villa. The first golden age of Philippine boxing emerge as Pancho Villa won the universal world flyweight championship from Welshman Jimmy Wilde to become the first ever Asian and Filipino world champion. Villa defended his title three times including a fight in the Philippines with fellow Filipino Clever Sencio where he won by fifteen-round decision, which at the time, nobody thought it would be the last victory of his young career. The glorious era was short-lived following the ring deaths of popular fighters Dencio Cabanela and Clever Sencio along with the death of Pancho Villa from Ludwig's angina and their influential promoter Frank Churchill.

There was also the Filipino-Spanish boxer, Luis Logan, who at one time or another held the title Oriental welterweight and heavyweight champion. Logan's boxing career spanned 1925–1940; and spent half his boxing career in Spain, Argentina, outside of the Philippines.

On October 2, 1939, a sudden uplift came when Ceferino Garcia won the NYSAC world middleweight championship from American Fred Apostoli at the Madison Square Garden, New York, United States. On December 23, 1939, Garcia successfully defended his title for the first time against American Glen Lee in front of his countrymen inside the Rizal Memorial Sports Complex which was the first world title bout ever recorded in the Philippine islands. Garcia also competed with some of the best boxers ever like Barney Ross and Henry Armstrong, to whom he denied his fourth title in four weight divisions through a draw. However, he then lost at the hands of Ken Overlin, unable to land his famous bolo punch and losing the title.

=== Second golden age of Philippine boxing ===
During the 1950s under the management of a renowned Asian boxing promoter and manager Lope Sarreal whom founded the Interphil Promotions Inc., Filipino boxing fans saw the birth of Philippine boxing's second golden era as a Cebuano boxer named Gabriel "Flash" Elorde beat the then reigning world featherweight champion and later Hall of Famer Sandy Saddler in a non-title bout at the Rizal Memorial Sports Complex on July 20, 1955. Elorde went on to win the world super featherweight championship from Harold Gomes by a seventh-round knockout on March 16, 1960. Elorde kept his world title inside a division record of 7 years and 2 months with 10 successful defenses, including a one-round knockout of Gomes in a rematch. Flash Elorde, during his time, was one of the busiest fighters who traveled to fight very often. A great and fearless fighter, Elorde was one of the most beloved Filipino athletes since Pancho Villa. In this Elorde inspired period, twenty world champions were created spanning from Roberto Cruz to Gerry Peñalosa along with the formation of the "Big Four of Professional Boxing" or the major sanctioning bodies, namely the WBA, WBC, IBF, and WBO. However, as time goes by, boxing was becoming less popular in the country because of many alternative sports including basketball until Manny Pacquiao came.

=== Third golden age of Philippine boxing (present) ===
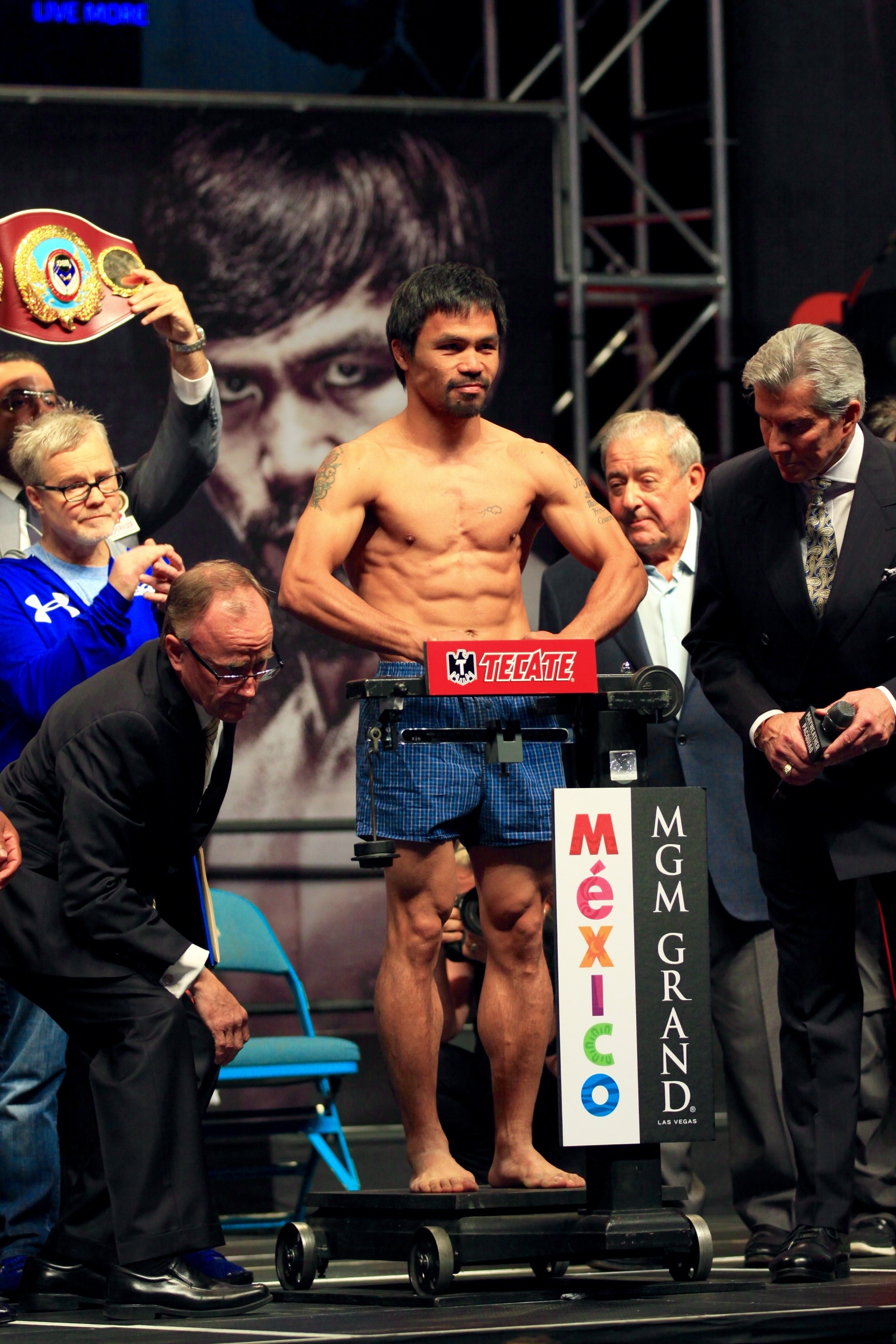
Manny Pacquiao: World's first and only octuple champion. Also only boxer to hold world titles in four different decades, in the 1990s, 2000s, 2010s, and 2020s

A Filipino boxer named Manny Pacquiao was an entertaining star in the local boxing television show called "Blow-by-Blow" by the famed Filipino manager and promoter Rod Nazario. Viewers became accustomed to Pacquiao's name not only because of his aggressive style but also due to his unique looks and catchy surname. Pacquiao's ascendancy heralded a new wave of Filipino boxers and marks the third great era of Philippine boxing.

On December 4, 1998, Pacquiao upset Thai Champion Chatchai Sasakul in Thailand to win the Lineal and WBC flyweight championship (his first world title). On his title defense, Pacquiao lost his title on the scale and was knocked out in the fight by Medgoen Singsurat of Thailand. Pacquiao lost his WBC title on the scales as he was unable to make the flyweight limit. Pacquiao gained weight and skipped the super flyweight and bantamweight divisions to fight at super bantamweight division. Pacquiao, for the second time in his career, was the heavy underdog against South African Lehlohonolo Ledwaba, the reigning IBF super bantamweight champion. On June 23, 2001, Pacquiao dethroned Ledwaba to win his second world title in two different weight divisions. In 2003, Pacquiao's career rose to its peak as he stopped the then reigning Lineal and The Ring featherweight champion Marco Antonio Barrera of Mexico via 11th-round technical knockout. Since that time, Pacquiao has acquired three lineal titles and four major (WBC & IBF) world titles along six different divisions—flyweight (112 lbs.), super bantamweight (122 lbs.), featherweight (126 lbs.), super featherweight (130 lbs.), lightweight (135 lbs.) and light welterweight (140 lbs.).

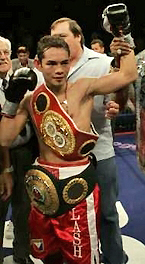
Nonito Donaire: World champion in across three consecutive decades: the 2000s, 2010s and 2020s

On November 14, 2009, Pacquiao surpassed Oscar De La Hoya's record of six-division titles by stopping WBO welterweight champion Miguel Angel Cotto to win his seventh title across seven divisions. One year later, he made history by being the first boxer ever to win eight world titles in eight weight divisions as he dominated Mexican slugger Antonio Margarito to win the vacant WBC light middleweight title in a catchweight bout. Since 2003, Pacquiao amassed a record of 21 wins, 3 defeats and 1 draw in his last 25 fights. The Filipino fighter defeated some of the best opposition available on the way to superstardom (earning the nickname "the Mexicutioner") including Mexicans Marco Antonio Barrera, Erik Morales, Juan Manuel Márquez and Antonio Margarito, British Ricky Hatton, Puerto Rican Miguel Cotto, and Americans Oscar De La Hoya, Shane Mosley, Timothy Bradley and Keith Thurman.

The "Pacquiao Wave" regenerated boxing in the Philippines, inspiring a new generation of boxers to aim ever higher. Nonito Donaire, one of the Pacquiao-wave fighters, became the second Asian to win four world titles in four weight divisions by defeating South African Simpiwe Vetyeka to claim the WBA featherweight title on May 31, 2014. In 2017, Donnie Nietes became the third Filipino boxer to win world titles in three different weight divisions when he defeated Thailand's Komgrich Nantapech in May 2017. In Dec. 31 2018, Donnie Nietes became the third Filipino boxer and third Asian to win world titles in Four different weight divisions when he defeated Japanese Kazuto Ioka via split decision on New Year's Eve, winning the vacant World Boxing Organization belt at the Wynn Palace in Macau. Another famous or rather infamous Filipino boxer John Riel Casimero became the fourth Filipino boxer to win world titles in three different weight divisions when he defeated Zolani Tete via TKO on November 30, 2019, in England. His boxing persona and antics pave the way to building-up his fights, this makes him a rarity in amongst Filipino boxing fans in present times.

== Philippines' contribution to boxing ==
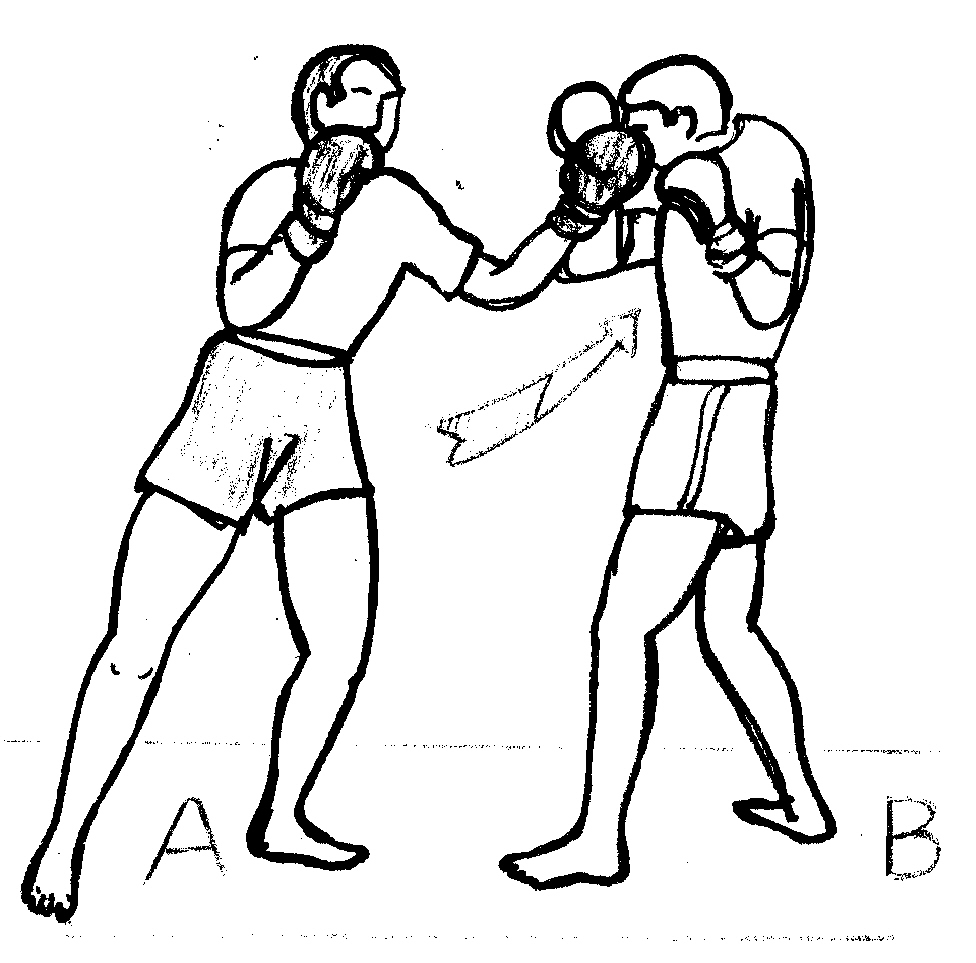
A left bolo punch in attack

The Philippines is one of the founding member nations of the World Boxing Council (WBC) and Oriental and Pacific Boxing Federation (OPBF). Filipino boxers also contributed to the history of boxing from rules and techniques to records and achievements. Pancho Villa is not only the first Asian and Filipino world champion but is also described as one of the cleanest boxers before the proper rules were established. Ceferino Garcia is credited as the inventor of the "bolo punch". However, according to Tahoma News-Tribune, a fellow Filipino boxer named Macario Flores was reportedly using it. Gabriel "Flash" Elorde still holds the record for longest reign in the super featherweight or junior lightweight (130 lbs.) division – 7 years, 2 months and 29 days with 10 title defenses. His success was due to his innovative footwork and maneuvers which he learned from training Balintawak Eskrima with his father "Tatang" Elorde who was the Eskrima champion of Cebu. Elorde's style from eskrima has been adopted by many boxers, including his friend Muhammad Ali, which influenced the out-boxer style of boxing.

While Donnie Nietes holds as the longest Filipino world champion in the light flyweight division. On November 13, 2010, Manny Pacquiao entered the Guinness Book of World Records for being the first ever boxer to win eight world titles in eight (8) different divisions (see also Octuple Champion) by defeating Mexican Antonio Margarito via 12-round unanimous decision to claim the vacant WBC light middleweight championship. Pacquiao was also is credited as the user of an advanced punching technique called "Manila Ice" which was invented by Freddie Roach proudly for him and became one of his powerful arsenal on his matches.

== Philippines' popular ring officials ==
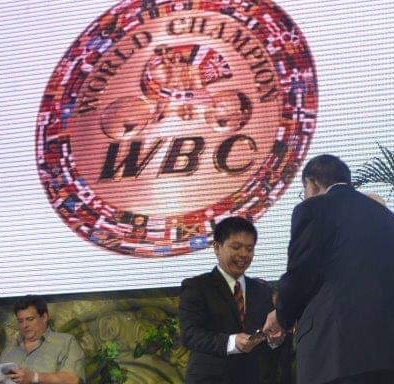
Rey Danseco is the only ring official from the Philippines and Asia to receive the highly regards award of world magnitude.

The Philippines has produced respected ring officials. Referee Carlos "Sonny" Padilla officiated the famous "Thrilla in Manila" match between Muhammad Ali and Joe Frazier in 1975. He worked as third man in the ring in many big matches for over 25 years.

In 2012, the World Boxing Council awarded Rey Danseco the Judge of the Year. He received the accolade in a rite held during the 50th Annual WBC Convention at the Grand Oasis Hotel in Cancún, Mexico. To date, Danseco is the only Asian boxing ring official to win an award of such magnitude. He is also a multiple Judge of the Year awardee in the Philippines until he moved to the US in 2012.

Danseco judged the world championship fights of some big names in boxing of his generation, such as Canelo Alvarez, Errol Spence Jr., Danny García, Robert Guerrero, Julio César Chávez, Bernard Hopkins, Austin Trout, Gerry Penalosa, Pongsaklek Wonjongkam, Badou Jack, Jorge Arce, Jhonny González, Adonis Stevenson, Tony Bellew, Josh Taylor, Toshiaki Nishioka, Shawn Porter, Edgar Sosa, Miguel Berchelt, Leo Santa Cruz, Abner Mares, Amir Khan, Daniel Dubois, Jamel Herring, Jessica McCaskill, Regis Prograis, and Khalid Yafai.

Padilla refereed or judged the fights of notable world champions, including Muhammad Ali, Joe Frazier, Alexis Argüello, Erbito Salavarria, Leon Spinks, Ken Norton, Larry Holmes, Sugar Ray Leonard, Lupe Pintor, Roberto Durán, Marvin Hagler, Roberto Durán, Bobby Chacon, Pipino Cuevas, Julio César Chávez, Michael Spinks, Mike Tyson, Michael Moorer, George Foreman, Azumah Nelson, Riddick Bowe, Terry Norris, Ray Mercer, Iran Barkley, Humberto González, Roger Mayweather, Kennedy McKinney, Johnny Tapia, Marco Antonio Barrera, Antonio Tarver, and Filipino greats Manny Pacquiao, Dodie Boy Peñalosa, Erbito Salavarria, Ben Villaflor, and Rolando Navarette in his career from 1967 until his retirement in year 2000.

== List of men's professional boxing world champions ==
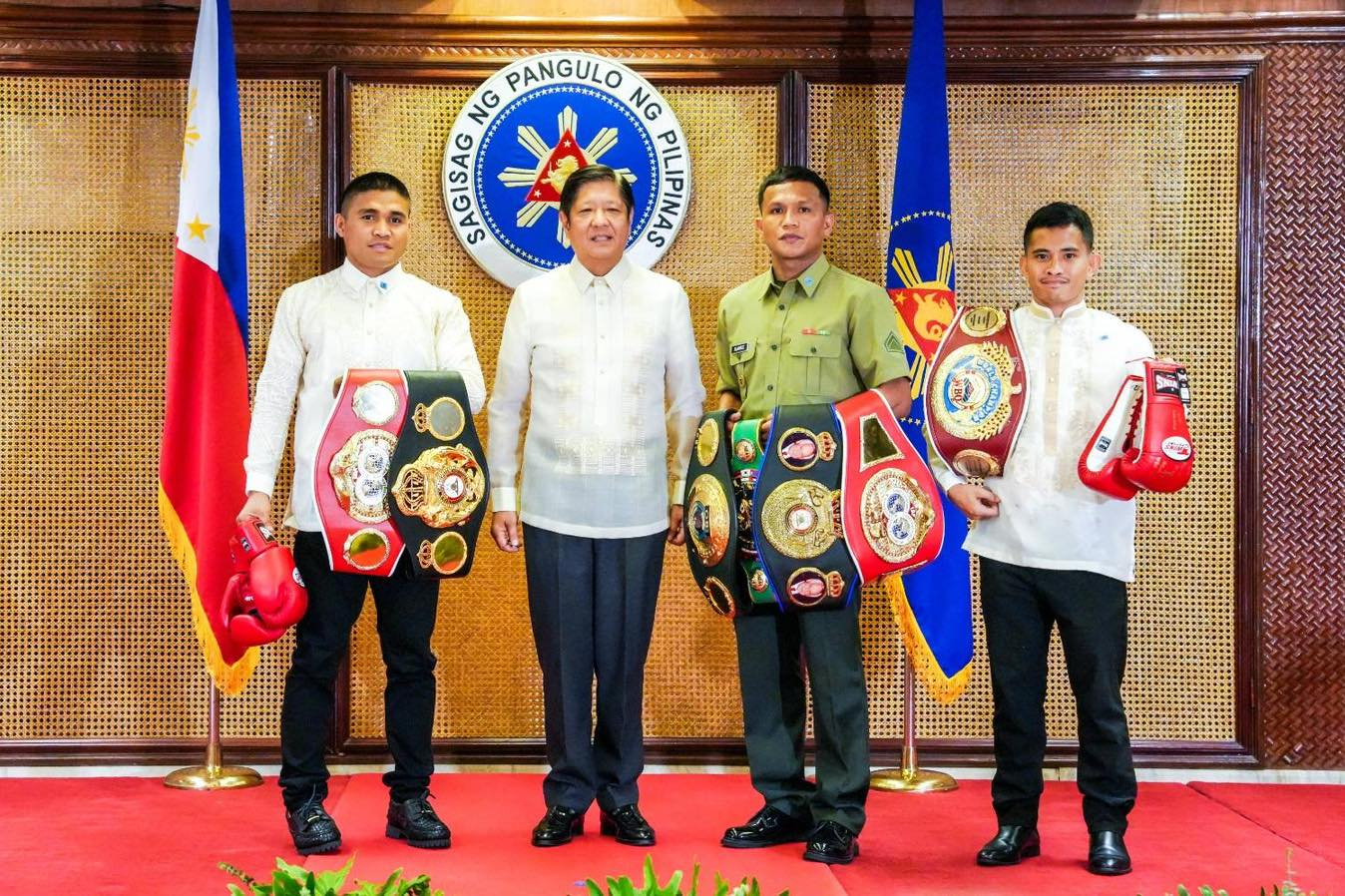
President Ferdinand R. Marcos Jr. congratulated Filipino artists and athletes who competed and won in various international events together with Boxing Champions: Marlon Tapales, Charly Suarez, and Melvin Jerusalem on 2023.

The following is a list of Filipino boxing champions who have held titles from one or more of the "Big Four" organizations (WBA, WBC, IBF, WBO) and The Ring.

In December 2000, the WBA created an unprecedented situation of having a split championship in the same weight class by introducing a new title called Super world, commonly referred to simply as Super. The Super champion is highly regarded as the WBA's primary champion, while the World champion – commonly known as the Regular champion by boxing publications – is only considered the primary champion by the other three major sanctioning bodies (WBC, IBF, and WBO) if the Super title is vacant.

A Unified champion is a boxer that holds the Regular title and a world title from another major sanctioning body (WBC, IBF, WBO) simultaneously. An Undisputed champion as defined by the WBA, only needs to hold three of the four major titles but in some cases they may change a Super champion into an Undisputed champion after a failed title defense (e.g. Anselmo Moreno losing to Juan Payano and Chris John losing to Simpiwe Vetyeka). This is not to be confused by professional boxing's own definition of an undisputed champion, in which a boxer must hold all four major titles.

Other former international/national-world boxing commissions and organizations from the beginning of boxing are also included here:

- New York State Athletic Commission (NYSAC)
- National Boxing Association (NBA) – changed its name to World Boxing Association (WBA) in 1962

	Inducted into the International Boxing Hall of Fame
	World titles from world and The Ring
	WBA Regular champion
H	denotes boxer of Filipino heritage due to parent's nationality, residence or other circumstances

No.	Name	Titles	Date	Opponent	Result
1	Pancho Villa	NYSAC Flyweight	Jun 16, 1923	Jimmy Wilde	TKO 7/20
1	Pancho Villa	NBA Flyweight	Jun 16, 1923	Jimmy Wilde	TKO 7/20
1	Pancho Villa	The Ring Flyweight	Jun 16, 1923	Jimmy Wilde	TKO 7/20
2	Small Montana	NYSAC Flyweight	Nov 5, 1935	Midget Wolgast	PTS 10/10
3	Little Dado	NBA Flyweight	Dec 11, 1939	Awarded	
4	Ceferino Garcia	NYSAC Middleweight	Oct 2, 1939	Fred Apostoli	KO 7/15
5	Dado Marino^{H}	NBA Flyweight	Jul 1, 1950	Terry Allen	UD 15/15
6	Flash Elorde	NBA Super featherweight, later changed to WBA.	Mar 16, 1960	Harold Gomes	KO 7/15
6	Flash Elorde	The Ring Super featherweight	1962	Awarded	
6	Flash Elorde	WBC Super featherweight	Feb 16, 1963	Johnny Bizzaro	UD 15/15
7	Roberto Cruz	WBA Light welterweight	Mar 21, 1963	Battling Torres	KO 1/15
8	Pedro Adigue	WBC Light welterweight	Dec 14, 1968	Adolph Pruitt	UD 15/15
9	Rene Barrientos	WBC Super featherweight	Feb 15, 1969	Rubén Navarro	UD 15/15
10	Bernabe Villacampo	WBA Flyweight	Oct 19, 1969	Hiroyuki Ebihara	KO 6/15
11	Erbito Salavarria	WBC Flyweight	Dec 7, 1970	Chartchai Chionoi	TKO 2/15
11	Erbito Salavarria	The Ring Flyweight	Dec 7, 1970	Chartchai Chionoi	TKO 2/15
11	Erbito Salavarria	WBA Flyweight	Apr 1, 1975	Susumu Hanagata	SD 15/15
12	Ben Villaflor	WBA Super featherweight	Apr 25, 1972	Alfredo Marcano	UD 15/15
12	Ben Villaflor	The Ring Super featherweight	Apr 25, 1972	Alfredo Marcano	UD 15/15
12	Ben Villaflor	WBA Super featherweight – (2)	Oct 17, 1973	Kuniaki Shibata	KO 1/15
12	Ben Villaflor	The Ring Super featherweight – (2)	Oct 17, 1973	Kuniaki Shibata	KO 1/15
13	Rolando Navarrete	WBC Super featherweight	Aug 29, 1981	Cornelius Boza Edwards	KO 5/15
14	Frank Cedeno	WBC Flyweight	Aug 27, 1983	Charlie Magri	KO 6/12
14	Frank Cedeno	The Ring Flyweight	Aug 27, 1983	Charlie Magri	KO 6/12
15	Bobby Berna	IBF Super bantamweight	Dec 4, 1983	Suh Sung-in	TKO 10/15
16	Dodie Boy Peñalosa	IBF Light flyweight	Dec 10, 1983	Satoshi Shingaki	TKO 13/15
16	Dodie Boy Peñalosa	IBF Flyweight	Feb 22, 1987	Shin Hi-sup	TKO 5/15
17	Rolando Bohol	IBF Flyweight	Jan 16, 1988	Choi Chang-ho	KO 15/15
18	Tacy Macalos	IBF Light flyweight	Nov 4, 1988	Choi Jum-hwan	KO 5/12
19	Eric Chavez	IBF Mini flyweight	Sep 21, 1989	Nico Thomas	KO 5/12
20	Luisito Espinosa	WBA Bantamweight	Oct 18, 1989	Khaokor Galaxy	KO 5/12
20	Luisito Espinosa	WBC Featherweight	Dec 11, 1995	Manuel Medina	UD 12/12
21	Jesus Salud^{H}	WBA Super bantamweight	Dec 11, 1989	Juan Jose Estrada	UD 12/12
22	Rolando Pascua	WBC Light flyweight	Dec 19, 1990	Humberto González	UD 12/12
23	Manny Melchor	IBF Mini flyweight	Sep 6, 1992	Thongchai Utaida	SD 12/12
24	Morris East	WBA Light welterweight	Sep 9, 1992	Akinobu Hiranaka	TKO 11/12
25	Gerry Peñalosa	WBC Super flyweight	Feb 20, 1997	Hiroshi Kawashima	SD 12/12
25	Gerry Peñalosa	WBO Bantamweight	Aug 11, 2007	Jhonny González	TKO 6/12
26	Eric Jamili	WBO Mini flyweight	Dec 19, 1997	Mickey Cantwell	TKO 8/12
27	Manny Pacquiao	WBC Flyweight	Dec 4, 1998	Chatchai Sasakul	KO 8/12
27	Manny Pacquiao	IBF Super bantamweight	Jun 23, 2001	Lehlohonolo Ledwaba	TKO 6/12
27	Manny Pacquiao	The Ring Featherweight	Nov 15, 2003	Marco Antonio Barrera	TKO 11/12
27	Manny Pacquiao	WBC Super featherweight	Mar 15, 2008	Juan Manuel Márquez	SD 12/12
27	Manny Pacquiao	The Ring Super featherweight	Mar 15, 2008	Juan Manuel Márquez	SD 12/12
27	Manny Pacquiao	WBC Lightweight	Jun 28, 2008	David Díaz	TKO 9/12
27	Manny Pacquiao	The Ring Light welterweight	May 2, 2009	Ricky Hatton	KO 2/12
27	Manny Pacquiao	WBO Welterweight	Nov 14, 2009	Miguel Cotto	TKO 12/12
27	Manny Pacquiao	WBC Light middleweight	Nov 13, 2010	Antonio Margarito	UD 12/12
27	Manny Pacquiao	WBO Welterweight – (2)	Apr 12, 2014	Timothy Bradley	UD 12/12
27	Manny Pacquiao	WBO Welterweight – (3)	Nov 5, 2016	Jessie Vargas	UD 12/12
27	Manny Pacquiao	WBA (Super) Welterweight	Jul 20, 2019	Keith Thurman	SD 12/12
28	Malcolm Tuñacao	WBC Flyweight	May 19, 2000	Medgoen Singsurat	TKO 7/12
29	Joma Gamboa	WBA Mini flyweight	Aug 20, 2000	Atsushi Sai	UD 12/12
30	Brian Viloria^{H}	WBC Light flyweight	Sep 10, 2005	Eric Ortiz	KO 1/12
30	Brian Viloria^{H}	IBF Light flyweight	April 19, 2009	Ulises Solís	UD 12/12
30	Brian Viloria^{H}	WBO Flyweight	Jul 16, 2011	Julio César Miranda	UD 12/12
30	Brian Viloria^{H}	WBA (Unified) Flyweight	Nov 17, 2012	Hernán Márquez	TKO 10/12
31	Florante Condes	IBF Mini flyweight	Jul 7, 2007	Muhammad Rachman	SD 12/12
32	Nonito Donaire	IBF Flyweight	Jul 7, 2007	Vic Darchinyan	TKO 5/12
32	Nonito Donaire	WBC Bantamweight	Feb 19, 2011	Fernando Montiel	KO 2/12
32	Nonito Donaire	WBO Bantamweight	Feb 19, 2011	Fernando Montiel	KO 2/12
32	Nonito Donaire	WBO Super bantamweight	Feb 4, 2012	Wilfredo Vázquez Jr.	SD 12/12
32	Nonito Donaire	IBF Super bantamweight	Jul 7, 2012	Jeffrey Mathebula	UD 12/12
32	Nonito Donaire	The Ring Super bantamweight	Dec 13, 2012	Toshiaki Nishioka	TKO 9/12
32	Nonito Donaire	WBA (Undisputed) Featherweight	May 31, 2014	Simpiwe Vetyeka	TD 5/12
32	Nonito Donaire	WBO Super bantamweight – (2)	Dec 11, 2015	Cesar Juarez	UD 12/12
32	Nonito Donaire	WBA (Super) Bantamweight	Nov 3, 2018	Ryan Burnett	RTD 4/12
32	Nonito Donaire	WBC Bantamweight – (2)	May 29, 2021	Nordine Oubaali	KO 4/12
33	Donnie Nietes	WBO Mini flyweight	Sep 7, 2007	Pornsawan Porpramook	UD 12/12
33	Donnie Nietes	WBO Light flyweight	Oct 8, 2011	Ramón García Hirales	UD 12/12
33	Donnie Nietes	The Ring Light flyweight	May 10, 2014	Moisés Fuentes	TKO 9/12
33	Donnie Nietes	IBF Flyweight	Apr 29, 2017	Komgrich Nantapech	UD 12/12
33	Donnie Nietes	WBO Super flyweight	Dec 31, 2018	Kazuto Ioka	SD 12/12
34	Marvin Sonsona	WBO Super flyweight	Sep 4, 2009	José López	UD 12/12
35	Rodel Mayol	WBC Light flyweight	Nov 21, 2009	Edgar Sosa	TKO 2/12
36	Sonny Boy Jaro	WBC Flyweight	Mar 2, 2012	Pongsaklek Wonjongkam	TKO 6/12
36	Sonny Boy Jaro	The Ring Flyweight	Mar 2, 2012	Pongsaklek Wonjongkam	TKO 6/12
37	John Riel Casimero	IBF Light flyweight	Jul 20, 2012	Interim promoted	
37	John Riel Casimero	IBF Flyweight	May 25, 2016	Amnat Ruenroeng	KO 4/12
37	John Riel Casimero	WBO Bantamweight	Nov 30, 2019	Zolani Tete	TKO 3/12
38	Merlito Sabillo	WBO Mini flyweight	Jul 13, 2013	Jorle Estrada	TKO 9/12
39	Marlon Tapales	WBO Bantamweight	Jul 27, 2016	Pungluang Sor Singyu	TKO 11/12
39	Marlon Tapales	WBA (Super) Super bantamweight	Apr 8, 2023	Murodjon Akhmadaliev	SD 12/12
39	Marlon Tapales	IBF Super bantamweight	Apr 8, 2023	Murodjon Akhmadaliev	SD 12/12
40	Jerwin Ancajas	IBF Super flyweight	Sep 3, 2016	McJoe Arroyo	UD 12/12
41	Milan Melindo	IBF Light flyweight	May 25, 2017	Akira Yaegashi	TKO 1/12
42	Vic Saludar	WBO Mini flyweight	Jul 13, 2018	Ryuya Yamanaka	UD 12/12
43	Pedro Taduran	IBF Mini flyweight	Sep 7, 2019	Samuel Salva	RTD 4/12
43	Pedro Taduran	IBF Mini flyweight – (2)	Jul 28, 2024	Ginjiro Shigeoka	TKO 9/12
44	Rene Mark Cuarto	IBF Mini flyweight	Feb 27, 2021	Pedro Taduran	UD 12/12
45	Mark Magsayo	WBC Featherweight	Jan 22, 2022	Gary Russell Jr.	MD 12/12
46	Melvin Jerusalem	WBO Mini flyweight	Jan 6, 2023	Masataka Taniguchi	TKO 2/12
46	Melvin Jerusalem	WBC Mini flyweight	Mar 31, 2024	Yudai Shigeoka	SD 12/12

Note

- Interim titles are not included unless they get promoted to the official champion.
- For WBA champions, only champions in the WBA primary lineage are listed.

=== List of WBA secondary champions ===
No.	Name	Titles	Reign period	Opponent	Result	Primary champion/s during reign
1	Manny Pacquiao	WBA (Regular) Welterweight	Jul 15, 2018 – Jul 20, 2019; Won Super title against Super champion Keith Thurman	Lucas Matthysse	TKO 7/12	Keith Thurman; Feb 7, 2017 – Jul 20, 2019
2	Vic Saludar	WBA (Regular) Mini flyweight	Feb 20, 2021 – Dec 21, 2021	Robert Paradero	SD 12/12	Thammanoon Niyomtrong; Mar 1, 2020 – Saludar lost the title to Erick Rosa while Niyomtrong was still the primary champion.

== List of women's professional boxing world champions ==
The following is a list of filipina boxing champions who have held titles from one or more of the "Big Four" organizations (WBA, WBC, IBF, WBO) and The Ring.

	Inducted into the International Boxing Hall of Fame
	World titles from world and The Ring
H	denotes boxer of Filipino heritage due to parent's nationality, residence or other circumstances

No.	Name	Titles	Date	Opponent	Result	Defenses
1	Ana Julaton^{H}	WBO Super bantamweight	Dec 4, 2009	Donna Biggers	UD 10/10	0
1	Ana Julaton^{H}	WBO Super bantamweight	Jun 30, 2010	Maria Elena Villalobos	SD 10/10	2

== Current titleholders in world boxing sanctioning bodies ==
Name	Organization	Division	Date won
Pedro Taduran	IBF	Mini flyweight	July 28, 2024

== Current titleholders in Philippine boxing sanctioning bodies ==
=== Philippines Games & Amusement Board ===
Weight class:	Champion:	Reign began:	Days
Mini flyweight	vacant		
Light flyweight	vacant		
Flyweight	vacant		
Super flyweight	vacant		
Bantamweight	Adrian Lerasan	March 20, 2025	537
Super bantamweight	Jerwin Ancajas	January 25, 2025	591
Featherweight	vacant		
Super featherweight	vacant		
Lightweight	vacant		
Light welterweight	vacant		
Welterweight	vacant		
Light middleweight	vacant		
Middleweight	vacant		
Super middleweight	not inaugurated		
Light heavyweight	vacant		
Cruiserweight	not inaugurated		
Heavyweight	not inaugurated		

=== Philippines Boxing Federation ===
Weight class:	Champion:	Reign began:	Days
Mini flyweight	Shane Gentallan	Novber 30, 2024	647
Light flyweight	John Ver Espra	April 9, 2025	882
Flyweight	Dennis Endar	March 9, 2025	548
Super Flyweight	Ramel Macado Jr.	June 29, 2025	436
Bantamweight	Noli James Maquilan	June 22, 2025	443
Super bantamweight	vacant		
Featherweight	Jhon Gemino	February 3, 2025	582
Super featherweight	vacant		
Lightweight	Romer Pinili	October 3, 2024	340
Light welterweight	Pepito Masangkay	January 18, 2025	598
Welterweight	Nelson Tinampay	March 12, 2025	545
Light middleweight	not inaugurated		
Middleweight	vacant		
Super middleweight	not inaugurated		
Light heavyweight	not inaugurated		
Cruiserweight	not inaugurated		
Heavyweight	not inaugurated		

== Boxing Hall of Fame ==
There are 4 Filipinos in the International Boxing Hall of Fame, all of them men. Here is a list of Filipinos who are in that hall of fame:

Filipinos in the International Boxing Hall of Fame

Number	Name	Year inducted	Notes
1	Flash Elorde	1993	NBA Super featherweight (130), The Ring Super Featherweight (130), & WBC Super featherweight (130) Champion. the first Filipino boxer who ever inducted on the International Boxing Hall of Fame. Holds the record at super featherweight division for longest title reign, spanning seven years. "Modern inductee"
2	Pancho Villa	1994	NYSAC Flyweight (112), NBA Flyweight (112), The Ring Flyweight (112) Champion. First Filipino/Asian World Champion. "Old-timer inductee"
3	Lope Sarreal	2005	Asia's leading promoter, manager, and international booking agent in the years that followed World War II. Also Known as the "Grand Old Man of Philippine Boxing" produced 22 world champions during his illustrious career."Non-participants"
4	Manny Pacquiao	2025	First and only boxer to win twelve major world titles in eight different weight divisions –Flyweight (112), Super bantamweight (122), Featherweight (126), Super featherweight (130), Lightweight (135), Light welterweight (140), Welterweight (147) & Super welterweight (154), his achievements remain unparallel in the history of boxing. Also became the oldest welterweight champion in 2019 with a win against WBA champ Keith Thurman."Modern inductee"

= Indicates the person is no longer alive

== See also ==
- Philippines national amateur boxing athletes
- Thrilla in Manila
- ALA Promotions
- MP Promotions
- Mano-A-Mano
- Thrilla in Manila II Countdown
- Thrilla in Manila: 50th Anniversary

=== Lists ===
- List of current world boxing champions
- List of boxing triple champions
- List of boxing quadruple champions
- List of boxing quintuple champions
- List of boxing sextuple champions
- List of boxing septuple champions
- Octuple champion
- List of WBA world champions
- List of WBC world champions
- List of IBF world champions
- List of WBO world champions
- List of IBO world champions
- List of The Ring world champions
