= Manomano =

Manomano or Mano mano may refer to:

- Manomano, a Maori marae in Halcombe, New Zealand
- Manomano, Zimbabwe, a ward in Nkayi, Zimbabwe
- ManoMano, a French unicorn startup company
- Mano-mano, unarmed fighting in Filipino martial arts
- Mano-Mano (Mozambican footballer)

== See also ==
- Mano a Mano (disambiguation)
- Mah Nà Mah Nà
