= Al Final de Este Viaje =

Al Final De Este Viaje

Studio album by Silvio Rodríguez
- Released: 1978
- Recorded: 1978
- Length: 34:45
- Label: Movieplay
- Producer: Pedro Orlando

Silvio Rodríguez chronology
Días y Flores (1975)	Al Final De Este Viaje (1978)	Mujeres (1979)

Al Final de Este Viaje is the second album by the Cuban singer-songwriter Silvio Rodríguez, released in 1978. In 2024, it was considered the fourth best album on the “Los 600 de Latinoamérica” list compiled by a collective of music journalists, highlighting the top 600 Latin American albums from 1920-2022.

== Album ==
The album was recorded in Madrid, Spain at Sonoland Studios, in 1978. It features Silvio Rodriguez accompanied only by his acoustic guitar, and includes songs composed between 1968 and 1970. It is one of his most straightforward albums, without the use of more complex arrangements.

The collection includes some of his best-known songs, considered classics of Latin American popular music, such as Ojalá, Canción del Elegido and Óleo de Mujer Con Sombrero.

== Track list ==
All tracks are written by Silvio Rodríguez.

Side A
No.	Title	Length
1.	"Canción del Elegido"	2:55
2.	"La Familia, La Propiedad Privada y El Amor"	3:48
3.	"Ojalá"	3:34
4.	"La Era Está Pariendo un Corazón"	3:10
5.	"Resumen de Noticias"	3:44

Side B
No.	Title	Length
1.	"Debo Partirme En Dos"	4:53
2.	"Óleo De una Mujer Con Sombrero"	2:25
3.	"Aunque No Esté de Moda"	3:36
4.	"Qué Se Puede Hacer Con El Amor"	3:10
5.	"Al Final de Este Viaje En La Vida"	3:46

== Personnel ==
- Silvio Rodríguez – guitar, vocals

=== Production ===
- Sonoland (Madrid, 1978).
- Production: Pedro Orlando
- Sound: José Antonio Álvarez Alija
