= Unicornio =

Studio album by Silvio Rodríguez
- Released: 1982
- Recorded: 1982
- Genre: Nueva trova
- Length: 44:43
- Language: Spanish
- Label: EGREM, Ojalá, Fonomusic
- Producer: Silvio Rodríguez

Silvio Rodríguez chronology
Rabo de Nube (1980)	Unicornio (1982)	Tríptico (1984)

Professional ratings
Review scores
Source	Rating
Allmusic	5/5 stars

Unicornio (Unicorn), is the fifth album by Cuban musician Silvio Rodríguez, released in 1982.

== Track listing ==
All tracks are written by Silvio Rodríguez

Side A
No.	Title	Length
1.	"Por Quien Merece Amor"	6:12
2.	"La Gaviota"	4:45
3.	"Son Desangrado"	5:05
4.	"Pioneros"	2:04
5.	"Hoy Mi Deber"	3:09

Side B
No.	Title	Length
6.	"La Primera Mentira"	3:28
7.	"Canción Urgente Para Nicaragua"	3:00
8.	"El Sol No da de Beber"	6:00
9.	"La Maza"	5:51
10.	"Unicornio"	5:09

== Personnel ==
Performing

- Piano and keyboards – José María Vitier, Frank Fernández, Hilario Durán Torres
- Bass – Jorge Reyes Hernández
- Drum kit – Bernardo García Carrera
- Rhythm – Reinaldo Valera del Monte, Francisco Amat, Héctor Arcos Huergo
- Guitar – Ahmed Barroso Jorajuría, Osear A. Hernández Rodríguez
- Flute – José L. Cortés González
- Oboe – Antonio Sánchez Hernández
- Clarinet – Rafael Inciarte Rodríguez
- Bassoon – Héctor Manresa Gómez
- French horn – Moisés Hernández Doménico, Francisco Santiago Novo, Darío Morgan González
- Trumpet – Armando Galán Alfonso, Andrés Castro
- Trombone – Antonio Leal Rodríguez, Demetrio Muniz Lavalle
- Violin – Lino Alemán Arvelo, Jesús Ordóñez Enríquez, Norberto Rodríguez de Castro, Humberto Benítez Sarduy, Pablo Mesa Suárez, José Ferrer Sosa, Luis Barrera Fernández, Nydia Mieses López, Ana Martínez de la Junquera, Taras Domitrov García, Pedro Cartas Martín, Juan Corrales Subida, Andrés Collazo Rodríguez, Frank Arias Ramírez, Martha Duarte Mustelier, Rafael Machado Ruiz, Daqoberto González Hernández, Lázaro González Sibone, Rosa M. Estrada Nogueiras, Armando Toledo Cisneros, Heriberto Fonseca Ribesco, Guillermo Gutiérrez Consuegra
- Viola – Mará L. Juan Carvajal, Rafael Cutiño, Roberto Herrera Díaz, Alina Neira Betancourt, José M. Fernández Rosado
- Cello – Roberto Rodríguez Gómez, Juan Elósegui Pérez, Víctor M. Puentes Fiffe, Osvaldo Cañi zares Cabrera, Jorge S. Suárez Trueba, Miguel Reina de la Torre, Alberto Alen Pérez, Rodolfo Navarro Fernández
- Double Bass – Iván Valiente Valdés
- Trío – Isidro Pérez Pérez, Osear A. Hernández Rodríguez, Waldo Domínguez Santiago.
