= Días y Flores =

Studio album by Silvio Rodríguez
- Released: 1975
- Genre: Nueva trova
- Length: 44:24
- Language: Spanish
- Producer: Frank Fernández

Silvio Rodríguez chronology
Pluma en Ristre (1969)	Días y Flores (1975)	Al Final de Este Viaje (1978)

1988 re-issue

Professional ratings
Review scores
Source	Rating
Allmusic	4.5/5 stars

Días y Flores is the debut studio album by Cuban singer-songwriter Silvio Rodríguez, released in 1975.

== Content ==
The album was censored in Francoist Spain. The track list was altered and the album was renamed to Te Doy una Canción. The songs Santiago de Chile and the title track Días y Flores were omitted and were replaced by Madre and Te Doy una Canción. With the end of the dictatorship, the two songs were added again, the new editions in Spain have thirteen songs.

Similarly, the album was also censored in Chile, due to the regime of Augusto Pinochet. A cassette titled Te Doy una Canción circulated, which did not contain the songs Santiago de Chile, Playa Girón, Como esperando abril and Pequeña Serenata Diurna, however it did includeTe Doy una Canción and a live version of Mariposas. There is also a CD like the Spanish version, which adds Madre after Santiago de Chile, and changes Días y flores for Te Doy una Canción.

== Track listing ==
All tracks are written by Silvio Rodríguez

1975 release
No.	Title	Length
1.	"Como Esperando Abril"	4:58
2.	"Playa Girón"	3:24
3.	"El Mayor"	3:34
4.	"La Vergüenza"	3:15
5.	"Sueño Con Serpientes"	5:33
6.	"Pequeña Serenata Diurna"	2:58
7.	"Esta Canción"	4:00
8.	"Yo Digo Que Las Estrellas"	3:29
9.	"En El Claro de La Luna"	4:57
10.	"Santiago de Chile"	4:23
11.	"Días y Flores"	4:01

1988 Hannibal compact disc release as Dias Y Flores: Song of the Nueva Trova Cubana
No.	Title	Length
1.	"El Mayor"	3:34
2.	"La Vergüenza"	3:15
3.	"Sueño Con Serpientes"	5:33
4.	"Pequeña Serenata Diurna"	2:58
5.	"Como Esperando Abril"	4:58
6.	"Playa Girón"	3:24
7.	"Esta Canción"	4:00
8.	"Yo Digo Que Las Estrellas"	3:29
9.	"En El Claro de La Luna"	4:57
10.	"Santiago de Chile"	4:23
11.	"Días y Flores"	4:01

== Personnel ==
=== Musicians ===
- Silvio Rodríguez – guitar, vocals
- Emiliano Salvador – piano
- Frank Fernández – keyboards
- Eduardo Ramos – bass
- Pancho Amat – guitar, tres
- Pablo Menéndez – guitar, tres, electric guitar
- Daniel Aldama – percussion
- Ignacio Berroa – drums, percussion
- Leoginaldo Pimentel – drums, percussion
- Norberto Carrillo – percussion
- Luis Ballard – flute
- Manuel Valera – saxophone on Pequeña Serenata Diurna

=== Production ===
- Jerzy Belc – engineer
