= Silvio Rodríguez =

Cuban folk singer and songwriter (born 1946)

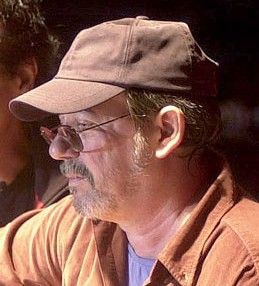
- Silvio in Argentina in 2004

Background information
- Born: Silvio Rodríguez Domínguez; 29 November 1946 (age 79)
- Origin: San Antonio de los Baños, Havana Province, Cuba
- Genre: Nueva Trova
- Occupation: Singer-songwriter
- Instruments: Guitar, vocals
- Years active: 1967–present
- Website: www.zurrondelaprendiz.com

Silvio Rodríguez Domínguez (born 29 November 1946) is a Cuban musician, and leader of the Nueva Trova movement.

He is widely considered as Cuba's best folk singer and arguably one of Latin America's greatest singer-songwriters. Known for his intellectual, highly eloquent and symbolic lyrics, his songs are iconic elements of Latin American left-leaning popular culture. Many of his songs have become classics in Latin American music, such as "Ojalá", "Playa Girón", "Unicornio", "Sueño con Serpientes", "Vamos a andar," and "La maza". Among his other well-known songs are political anthems like "Fusil contra fusil" and "Canción del Elegido", and poetic melodies like "A donde van" and "Noche sin fin y mar". He has released over 20 albums.

Rodríguez, musically and politically, is a symbol of the Latin American left. His lyrics are notably introspective, while his songs combine romanticism, eroticism, existentialism, revolutionary politics and idealism. As a humanist, his songs often bespeak a secular worldview, where humanity must make the best of this world.

== Biography ==
=== Childhood ===
Rodríguez was born on 29 November 1946 in San Antonio de los Baños, a fertile valley in Havana Province known for its tobacco crop. He was raised in a family of poor farmers. His father, Víctor Dagoberto Rodríguez Ortega, was a farmer and amateur poet who supported socialist causes. His mother, Argelia Domínguez León, was a housewife. During her adolescence, she was a part of a singing duo with sister Orquídea Domínguez, with whom she participated in many radio broadcasts and cultural events. The first of his mother's songs that Rodríguez recalls hearing is "El colibrí," a Cuban folk song that he would later sing during many of his tours. On many occasions, Rodríguez has spoken how his love of music was developed by his mother, who would pass time singing boleros and songs from Santiago. Later, she also collaborated with him on a few musical works. One of his uncles, Ramiro Domínguez, was a professional musician and a member of the group Jazz Band Mambí. This musical environment, which began with grandmother María León and her husband Felíx Domínguez, lovers of the trova musical style, inspired Rodríguez to take an interest in music during his childhood.

Rodríguez was just two years old when he began singing for his father's friends. A few years later, he participated in the music competition Buscando una estrella ("Looking for a Star"), hosted by the now-defunct Cuban radio station CMQ. He was invited a few days later to participate in a musical competition for children held by the same station, this time directed by the well-known announcer Germán Pinelli. This time, he won first place for singing the bolero Viajera ("Traveler").

When he was five years old, Silvio and his family moved to Havana due to a better job opportunity for his father in the tapestry business. In the capital, he participated in a radio event with the theme "We are Happy Today." He received his first instrument, a conga drum, from his uncle Ramiro. He would use it to imitate the rhythms of Benny Moré and the Orquesta Aragón.

In 1953, at the age of seven years old and the beginning of the Cuban Revolution, his father enrolled him in the La Milagrosa Conservatory. There, he passed the introductory class and the first piano course, given by Margarita Pérez Picó, within six months. However, in spite of Pérez's enthusiasm, Silvio lost interest and dropped out of the course after a short time. At nine years old and motivated by his father, who read him poems by José Martí and Rubén Darío, among others, he took an interest in literature, paying attention to the work of both poets, as well as the genre of science fiction. Antoine de Saint-Exupéry's The Little Prince remained one of his favorite books in adulthood.

At the age of ten years old, Rodríguez's parents divorced, and he temporarily returned to his hometown with his mother and sister. The two years that followed this event would be immortalized later in various songs published between 1969 and 1984, such as "El Papalote" or "Me veo claramente". However, his parents reconciled in 1958 and decided to move back to the capital, specifically to 530 San Miguel Street, in the city center.

=== Adolescence ===
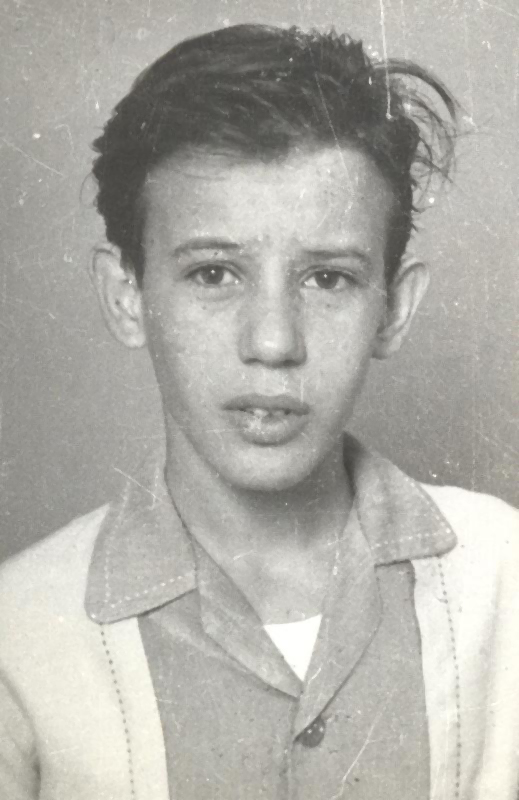
Rodríguez in 1962

On 1 January 1959, when Rodríguez was thirteen years old, Fidel Castro's Éjercito Rebelde brought an end to the dictatorship of Fulgencio Batista. This event shaped the musical life of the singer-songwriter and coincided with his transition from childhood into adolescence. Like many Cubans of his generations, he became involved with the new revolutionary enthusiasm. Despite regularly traveling between his hometown and the capital, he enlisted in the San Antonio de los Baños chapter of the Association of Socialist Youth, created by Che Guevara. In parallel to his participation in this organization, Rodríguez enrolled in night school at the Carlos J. Finnay school to study for the bachillerato, a post-secondary degree. There, he became friends with Vicente Feliú, another future member of the Nueva Trova movement.

The following year, amid social tension due to Cuba's nationalization of businesses and the United States' embargo, his parents separated once again, this time indefinitely. Argelia, who at this time worked at home as a hairdresser, married a man named Rolando and moved to 456 Gervasio Street, near Dagoberto. Silvio took an interest in classical music during this time.

In January 1961, the United States broke diplomatic relations with Cuba following the election of president John F. Kennedy, who authorized the Central Intelligence Agency (CIA) to invade the country. On 15 April, bombings began in Havana, Santiago de Cuba, and San Antonio de los Baños, to which the family had recently returned despite the protests of Silvio, who had recently joined his school's militia. The return to his hometown was an opportunity for Silvio to assume new responsibilities, passing from adolescence to young adulthood.

=== Young adulthood ===
One of the first social goals of the Cuban Revolution was to drastically reduce the rate of illiteracy in the country. In one year, it was able to reduce the rate from 23.6% to 3.9%. Though still a minor, he participated as a member of the Conrado Benítez Literacy Brigades in the Escambray Mountains. There, he helped give the campesinos classes in history, geography, grammar, and mathematics, as well as explaining elements of the new government, such as the Agrarian Reform plan. In 1961, during one of the campaigns, Rodríguez ingested a toxic plant, suffering second-degree burns that forced him to return to Havana.

Once again in the capital, he met the caricaturists Virgilio Martínez and José Luis Posada, who worked for Mella, a communist magazine. He began to collaborate with the magazine in early 1962. He met the writers Víctor Casaus and Luis Rogelio Nogueras, who would later write a book, Silvio: que levante la mano la guitarra, later adapted into a film of the same name. Rodríguez began to read the works of Federico García Lorca, Pablo Neruda, Nicolás Guillén, Edgar Allan Poe, and Walt Whitman. Through the magazine, Rodríguez became well known for his work as illustrator for the series El hueco. One of his colleagues, Lázaro Fundora, played the guitar as a hobby and taught Rodríguez the first chords of the instrument that would become a key part of his future work.

In 1963, with the birth of his second sister, Anabell López, the daughter of his mother and Rolando, Rodríguez began his studies in painting at the School of San Alejandro, in Havana. He also returned to the piano classes he had abandoned in his childhood, this time under the guidance of Elvira Fabre Obregón.

At 17 years old in 1964, he was required to participate in compulsory military service. He joined the Fuerzas Armadas Revolucionarias (FAR), where he would meet Esteban Baños, a member of his unit who gave him further instruction in playing the guitar. It was in the Managua military encampment that Rodríguez composed his first songs, which he played for the other soldiers. His first songs, written in 1964 and 1965, were the boleros ¨Saudade" and "La cascada," both about love; later, he wrote "Atavismo", "Nuestra ciudad", "Es sed", "Te vas", and "La otra presencia". His interest in protest songs came shortly after this period. At the same time, he worked as an illustrator for the Art and Science section of the magazine Venceremos, which was published by the political section of the Army. In 1965, he transferred to the magazine Verde Olive, where he remained until the end of his military service, working during the day and teaching himself the guitar at night.

In 1967, just before completing his military service, Rodríguez won an honorary mention in the literary competition of the FAR for his book of poems Honradado Cuaderno No. 1. At the end of this period, Rodríguez began his prolific music career.

== Music career ==
=== Television career ===
Rodríguez made his musical debut in front of the general public on June 13, 1967 in the television program Música y estrellas, invited to perform by musical director Mario Romeu. On that occasion, Rodríguez performed "Es sed", "Sueño del colgado y la tierra", and "Quédate", the latter of which appeared later on his album Expedición, released in 2002.

Between November 1967 and mid-1968, he was the host of the television program Mientras tanto, named after one of his songs. The program had artists, writers, cinematographers, and new and established artists as guest stars. Among those featured were Bola de Nieve, Omara Portuondo, and Elena Burke, among other influential Cuban artists. Each episode ended with Rodríguez's song "Y nada más", which appeared in his 1978 album Mujeres. After the death of Che Guevara in 1967, he wrote the protest songs "¿Por qué?", and "La leyenda del águila". Other songs written during this period include 'Ay de mí', 'Debajo del cañón', 'Déjame regresar', 'En busca del tiempo perdido', 'En ti', 'Graciela', 'Grita más', 'Hay un grupo que dice', 'Los funerales del insecto', 'María', 'Muerto', 'Oye', 'Quién va a pensar en algo más', 'Si se va la esperanza', 'Tema de la adolescencia', 'Tengo que estar en ti', 'Treinta años', 'Tu beso', and 'Y anoche'. Some of these were dedicated to a woman named Emilia, who he viewed as his first important love.

Rodríguez affirms that he has always felt a sense of panic in front of the lights and cameras. However, despite his notoriety for being a nervous television host, his program received a positive reception from the Cuban public.

=== Nueva Trova ===
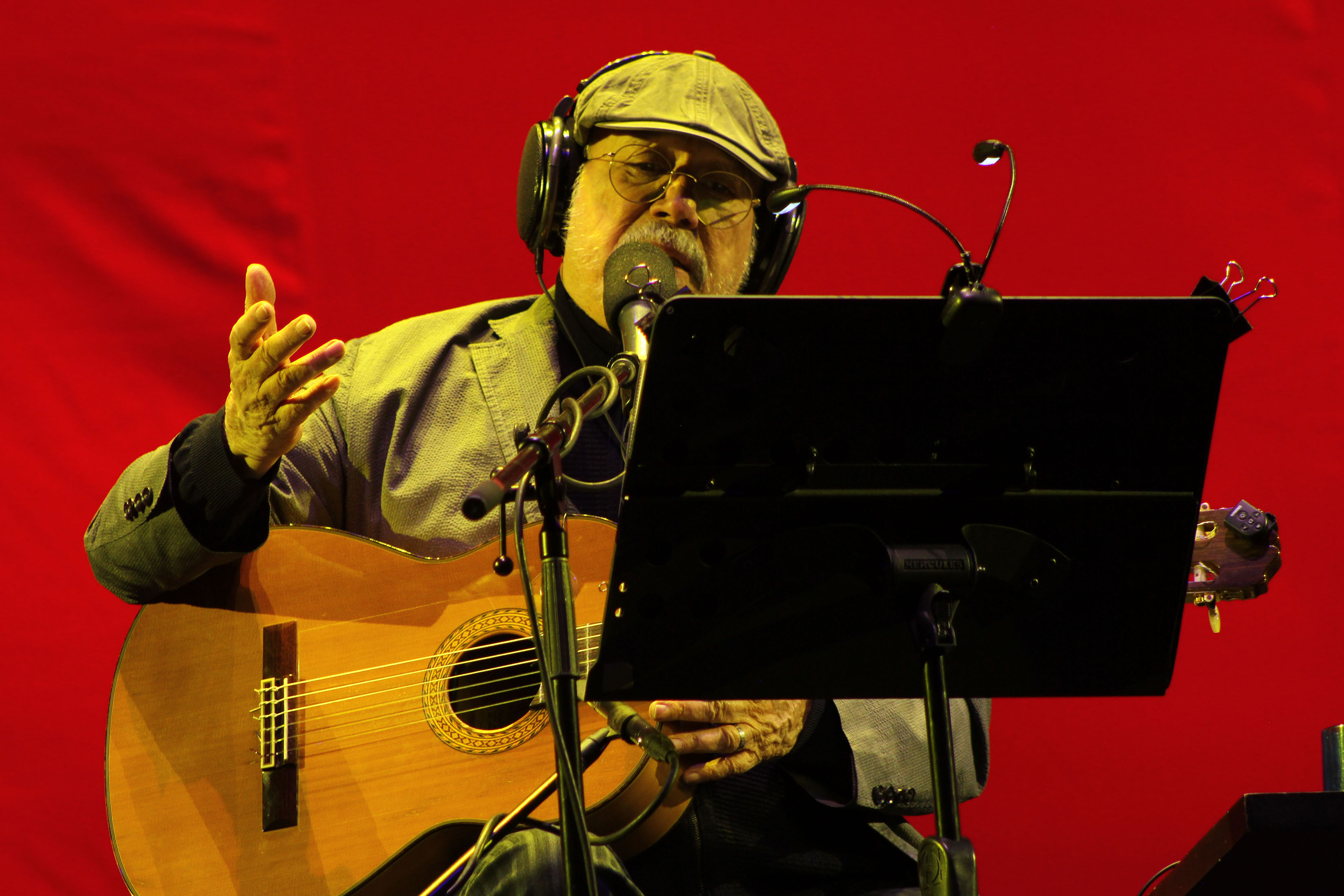
Rodríguez performing in Mexico City, 2022

It wasn't until 1967, with his first television experience, that he started to become well known and influential among Cuban revolutionary youth. With pro-revolution, yet very independent, lyrics (together with his very informal dress code), Rodríguez soon attracted the animosity of some members of the new Culture Ministry, which was devoted to the eradication of the United States' influence in Cuban culture. In this context, a very important role was played by the cultural institution Casa de las Américas and its then director Haydée Santamaría, a respected revolutionary who had participated in the Moncada barracks assault of 1953 and who was the sister of Abel Santamaría, who had been tortured and killed after the failure of the assault. Haydée Santamaría became a protective mother-figure of the young composer and of several of his colleagues at the time. Casa de las Américas became the home not only for the new Cuban trovadores but also for many other Latin Americans on the left. It was in this institution that Rodríguez met Pablo Milanés and Noel Nicola, who along with Rodríguez would become the most famous Nueva Trova singers and composers.

In 1969, for almost five months, he worked as part of the crew on the fishing boat Playa Girón, and during this fertile episode he wrote 62 songs, among which are the famous "Ojalá" and "Playa Girón." The lyrics and music of these songs became a book named Canciones del Mar. In 1976, he decided to join Cuban troops in Angola, playing for the soldiers.

After more than 40 years of artistic work, Rodríguez has now written a vast number of songs and poems (said to be between 500 and more than one thousand), many of which have never been set to music and probably never will be. Although his musical knowledge has been continuously increasing (counting among his teachers the famous Cuban composer Leo Brouwer), he is more widely praised for the poetry in his songs than for the accompanying music. His lyrics are a staple of leftist culture throughout the whole Spanish-speaking world, and he has been banned from the media during several of the dictatorial regimes that ruled Latin America in the late 1970s and early 1980s.

His debut album was Días y flores, launched in 1975. Al final de este viaje and Cuando digo futuro feature songs he composed before Días y flores. He reached international popularity in the early 1980s with Rabo de nube and, in particular, Unicornio. In the early part of his career his work displayed a fair amount of revolutionary optimism. Mujeres, released in 1979, is in contrast a romantic and highly intimist album. In the middle of his career, Silvio Rodríguez experimented with sounds and rhythms departing from his trademark acoustic guitar, accompanied by the group Afrocuba (e.g. in Causas y azares). At maturity, Silvio Rodríguez thoroughly purified his sound through a return to acoustic guitar, great care and sophistication in the voice, and exclusive control of the production process from beginning to end. His lyrics became more introspective, at times even self-absorbed or self-justifying, expressing melancholic longings about the shortcomings of real-life socialism in Cuba while vindicating idealism and revolutionary hope amongst the youth. The trilogy, called Silvio, Rodríguez, and Domínguez (his first name, his father's last name, his mother's last name) displays sound artistic talent. The doubts, absent in the early part of his career, also correspond to the fall of Soviet communism and the so-called Special Period in Cuba. An unnoticed recurrent theme in the lyrics of the early part of his career is that of death, particularly although not only as associated with guerrilla warfare. In contrast to the explicitness of his early songs and political positions, there was a displacement of emphasis in his later years toward fantasy and dreams. Both, however, are about an alternative that is not present but is called for, or what Laclau would call a longing for a "missing fullness". This is true politically, romantically, and existentially. In a similar way, the unusual confessional tone of many of his songs allows for an unorthodox combination of transgression, eroticism, longing, and at times (probably accurate) self-deprecation in many of his lyrics.

The entire work of Silvio Rodríguez offers an intimate and introspective window into the life cycle of the artist. If the lyrics of the early part of his career are about revolutionary enthusiasm, love encounters and disappointments, as well as sensual desire, and if the middle-aged Silvio is more self-questioning, often looking backward; his most recent albums, such as Cita con ángeles, talk in part about his life as a grandfather and has a certain focus on children, while Érase que se era is the release (with all the means that come with being an established artist) of songs written early in his youth but never previously recorded. Mariposas also featured two classics composed in his youth.

Silvio Rodríguez stands out in the Spanish-speaking world for the intimacy and subtlety of his lyrics, as well as for his acoustic melodies and "chord picking." He is particularly popular amongst intellectual circles of the left in Latin America and Spain. He has also often served as Cuban cultural emissary in events of solidarity, whether in Chile (Silvio Rodríguez in Chile, 1990) or Argentina (En vivo en Argentina, recorded in 1984), both massive concerts given shortly after the fall of the right-wing dictatorships. Cuban flags are always conspicuous in the crowd during his concerts. Chilean audiences had become familiar with Silvio Rodríguez through the circulation of clandestine pirate cassettes in the 1980s.

In 2007, he received a doctorate honoris causa from Universidad Nacional Mayor de San Marcos in Peru. (Lima, Peru).

In 2022 he received the Choir of Honor of the International Festival of New Latin American Cinema in Havana (Coral de Honor del Festival Internacional de Nuevo Cine Latinoamericano de La Habana) for his contributions to Cuban cinema soundtracks.

In June 2023, he was awarded he title of Doctor Honoris Causa in Social Sciences and Humanities by the University of Havana.

Rodríguez has been a major influence on many folk artists, including the Swedish artist José González.

== U.S. appearance ==
Silvio Rodríguez has been denied a United States visa several times, and it was particularly controversial in 2009 when he was invited to celebrate the 90th birthday of Pete Seeger. However, in 2010, he obtained a visa and performed at venues in Puerto Rico (30 May), New York (4 and 10 June), Oakland, (12 June), Los Angeles (17 June), Washington, D.C. (19 June) and Orlando (23 June). These were his first appearances in the United States in 30 years.

== Discography ==
=== Studio albums ===
- 1975 – Días y Flores
- 1978 – Al Final de Este Viaje
- 1979 – Mujeres
- 1979 – Rabo de Nube
- 1982 – Unicornio
- 1984 – Tríptico: Volumes I, II & III
- 1992 – Silvio
- 1994 – Rodríguez
- 1996 – Domínguez
- 1998 – Descartes
- 1999 – Mariposas
- 2002 – Expedición
- 2003 – Cita con Ángeles
- 2006 – Érase Que Se Era
- 2010 – Segunda Cita
- 2015 – Amoríos
- 2020 - Para la espera
- 2024 - Quería saber

=== Collaborative albums ===
- 1986 – Causas y Azares (with Afrocuba)
- 1987 – Árboles (with Roy Brown)
- 1988 – Oh, Melancolía (with Afrocuba)
- 2021 - Silvio Rodríguez Con Diákara (with Diákara)

=== Live albums ===
- 1977: Cuando Digo Futuro
- 1984: En Vivo en Argentina (with Pablo Milanés)
- 1990: Silvio Rodríguez en Chile
- 1990: España y Argentina en vivo
- 1993: Mano a Mano (with Luis Eduardo Aute)

=== EP ===
- 1968 – Canción Protesta
- 1969 – Pluma en Ristre
