= Bolo punch =

Wide sweeping lower cut used in martial arts

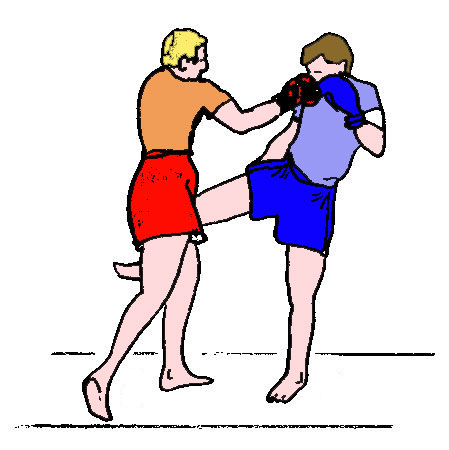
- Bolo punch in Burmese boxing
- Also known as: France: Semi-circulaire Serbia: Фрљотка Romania: Semi-circulară Thailand: Mat Wiyeng San Burma: Wai Latt-di
- Focus: Striking
- Creator: Philippines

A bolo punch is a punch used in martial arts. The bolo punch is not among the traditional boxing punches (jab, uppercut, hook and cross).

Bolo is a Filipino single-edged knife similar to the machete. The primary use for the bolo is clearing vegetation. However, it is also one of the most important weapons in Filipino martial arts. After the United States defeated Spain in the Spanish–American War, they took over occupation of the Philippine Islands. Many Filipinos began emigrating to the United States, mostly California and Hawaii, as farm laborers. These immigrants were practitioners of the Filipino martial arts which included the boxing art known as Suntukan, Panantukan, or Pangamot. Many of these Filipino fighters gravitated towards the local sport boxing matches because they could earn more from one boxing match than working a week on the farms. Some used false names and traveled around so they could get around the boxing commission rules and fight more often without any restrictions. They would often use an unorthodox punch that the non-Filipino boxers had never seen before. It became known as the "bolo punch" because the movement was similar to swinging a bolo machete when working to cut down crops like sugar cane when working in the fields.

Ceferino Garcia is commonly referred to as the inventor of the bolo punch, though a 1924 article appearing in the Tacoma News-Tribune reported a Filipino boxer named Macario Flores to be using it. Garcia, Kid Gavilán, Sugar Ray Robinson, Sugar Ray Leonard and Pedro Carrasco are widely recognized as some of the best bolo punchers in boxing history. Roy Jones Jr. and Joe Calzaghe also used the bolo punch frequently.

When used in boxing, the bolo punch's range of motion is like that of a hook combined with an uppercut. As such, the punch should be thrown at 4–5 o'clock from an orthodox boxer's perspective. Its most important aspect is a circular motion performed with one arm to distract an opponent, causing the opponent to either take his eyes off the attacker's other arm or actually focus on the fighter's circling arm. When the opponent concentrates on the hand that is circling, the bolo puncher will usually sneak in a punch with the opposite hand. When the rival concentrates on the hand that is not moving, the bolo puncher will usually follow through with a full punch.

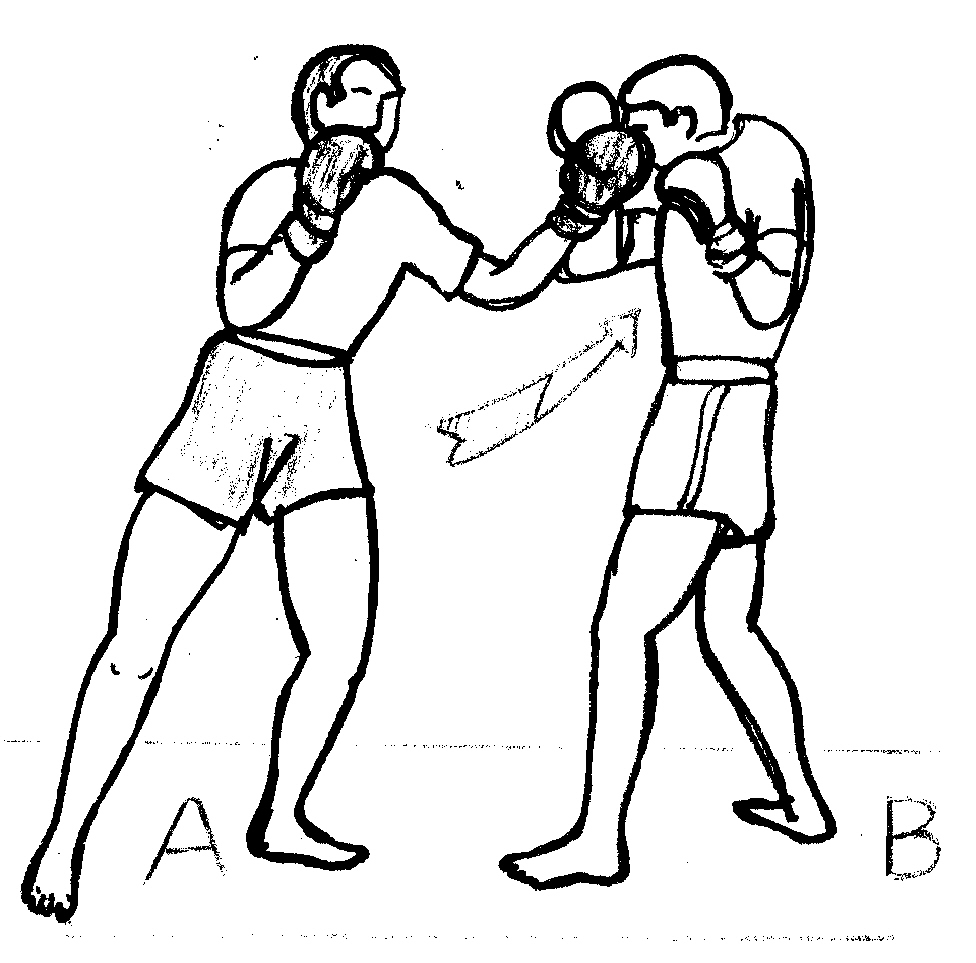
A left bolo punch in attack

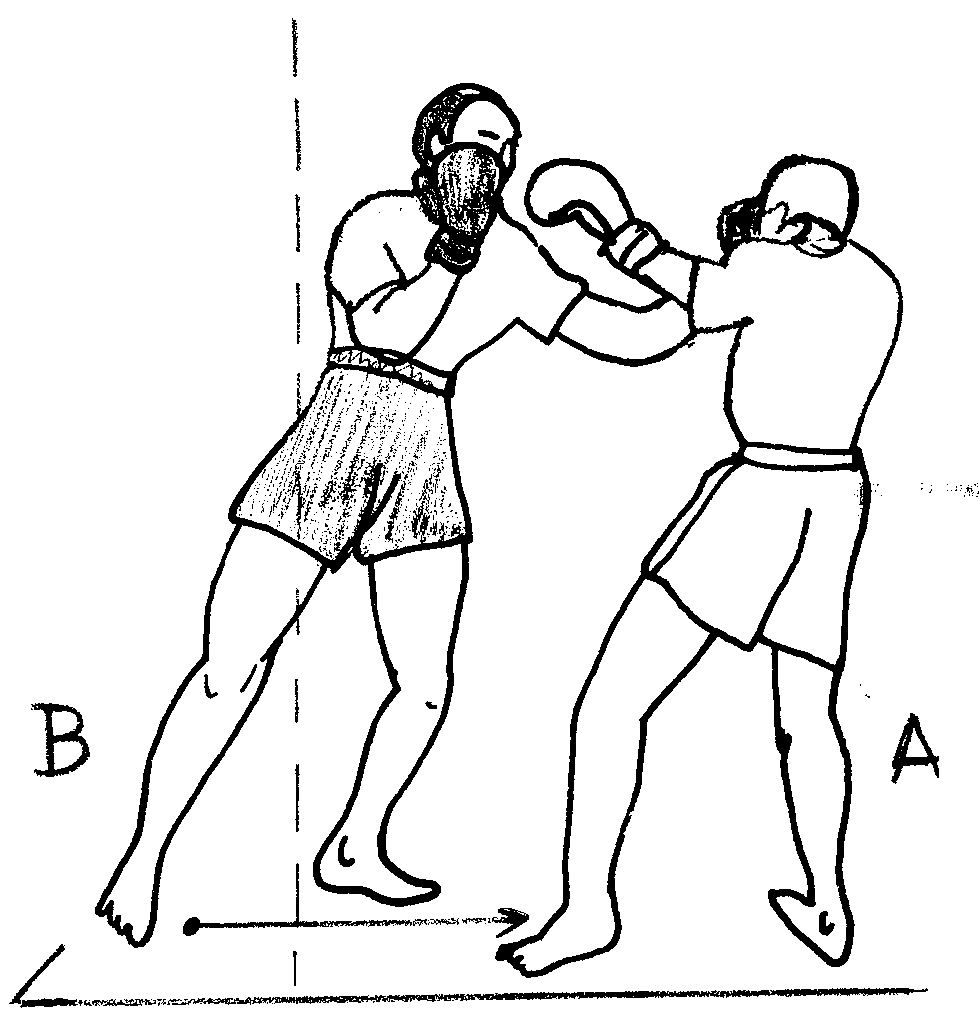
A left bolo punch in counterpunch

Three of the most famous cases of a fighter using the bolo punch were when Leonard avenged his loss to Roberto Durán in "The No Más Fight", when Leonard drew with Thomas Hearns in their second fight, and when Ike Ibeabuchi knocked out Chris Byrd with a left-handed bolo punch during their 1999 heavyweight contest.
