= Luis Eduardo Aute =

Spanish musician, singer, composer, and director (1943–2020)

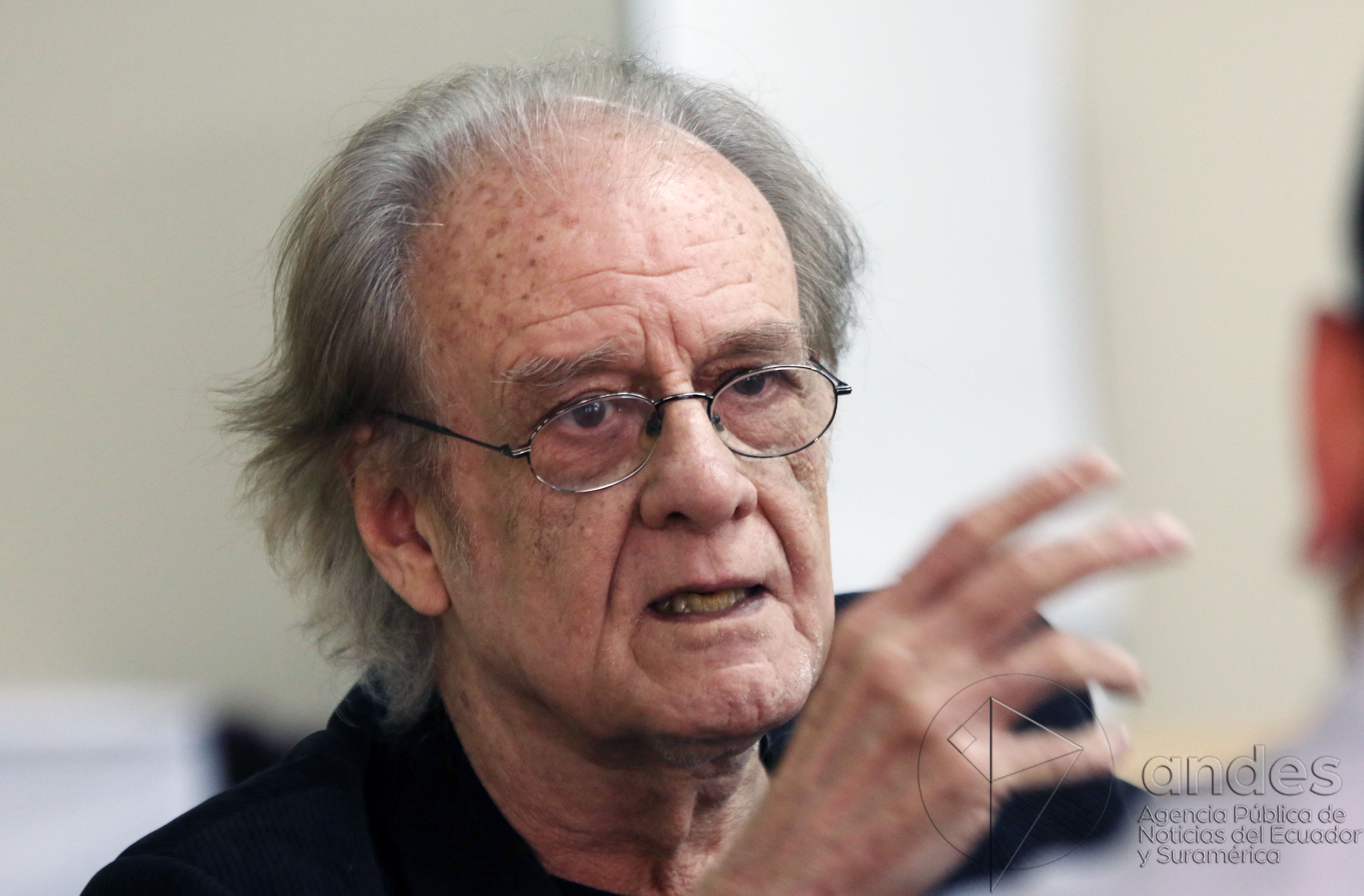
- Luis Eduardo Aute in 2016
- Born: Luis Eduardo Aute Gutiérrez; 13 September 1943; Manila, Commonwealth of the Philippines
- Died: 4 April 2020 (aged 76); Madrid, Spain
- Occupations: Painter; musician; singer; composer; film director

Luis Eduardo Aute Gutiérrez (13 September 1943 – 4 April 2020) was a Spanish musician, singer, composer, and film director.

Aute died in April 2020 from COVID-19.

== Biography ==
=== First years in the Philippines ===
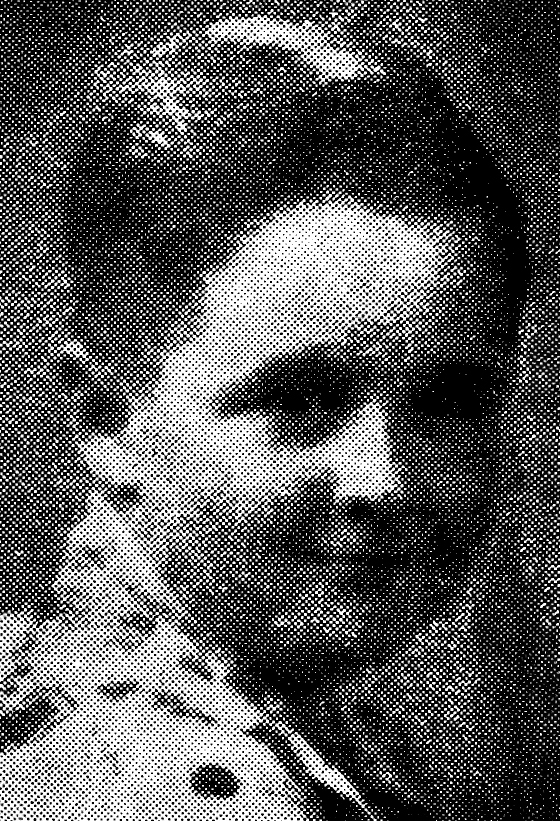
Aute as a child, 1950

Luis Eduardo Aute was born in Manila on 13 September 1943. His father, a Catalan (from Catalonia, Spain) had worked there for a tobacco company since 1919 and married a Spanish Filipina.

In his childhood, Aute studied at the De La Salle School, where he learned English and Tagalog, which is used within his family. At an early age, he showed unusual ability as a painter and sketcher. Another childhood passion was cinema; his interest in filmmaking was abetted by his parents' giving him an 8 mm camera, which he used to produce home-made movies with his friends.

At the age of eight, he made his first trip to Spain. In Madrid, he sang for the first time in public with the Hotel Aveneda orchestra, interpreting the song "Las hojas muertas" ("The Dead Leaves"). At age 9 he watched On the Waterfront, a movie that had a powerful influence on him and inspired him to write his first poems in English. Another cinematic influence at that age was the movie Niagara, where he discovered the eroticism and sensuality of Marilyn Monroe.

=== Return to Spain ===
In 1954, after a short stay in Barcelona, Aute returned definitively to Madrid, where he studied at the Colegio Nuestra Señora de las Maravillas. At 15, with his new guitar received as a birthday present, he performed at an end of school party, as part of a trio with two friends. Although he enjoyed music, art remained his primary passion. During these early years he was strongly influenced by German Expressionism and dedicated most of his time to painting, winning a silver medal in a Spanish Juvenile Art Contest.

==== 1960s and 1970s ====
Aute initially planned to be an architect but left school almost immediately to pursue a variety of career paths—music, art, and film. He also wrote screenplays and several short stories (science fiction). Aute spent more than a year in France after his military service in Catalan, working mainly in film. One of his first jobs was working as a translator and second assistant of director Joseph L. Mankiewicz for the film Cleopatra.

=== Music ===
When he returned to Spain, he began writing songs for other artists like Massiel (Rosas en el mar). His song "Aleluya #1" became a huge hit in the United States when recorded in the United States by Ed Ames as "Who Will Answer". Although his friends and colleagues encouraged him to record his own songs, Aute initially refused, saying he didn't enjoy performing publicly.

Eventually, he pushed past his shyness and began a successful career with singles like "Don Ramón" and "Made in Spain". His first album was Diálogos de Rodrigo y Ximena in 1968. By the 1970s, he was creating soundtracks for films directed by Jaime Chávarri, Luis García Berlanga, Fernando Fernán-Gómez, Fernando Méndez, and others.

In 1977, Aute performed in his first large public concert in Spain. Invited by the Cuban government to participate in the World Festival of Youth in Havana, Aute contracted tuberculosis and spent five months in Cuba recovering. This enforced downtime cemented his friendship with a Cuban musician, Silvio Rodríguez, whom he later shared a concert stage with. That concert, Mano a Mano, became the basis of an international best-selling album.

=== Art ===
Aute had his first individual exhibit in the gallery Alcon de Madrid in 1960. He was just sixteen. Two years later, he had his second exhibit in Madrid's Gallery Quixote. By 1964, his work was being sold in the United States at the Juarez Gallery in Palm Beach, Florida.

In 1966, he was selected to participate in the Nona Biennial de São Paulo in Brazil, where he brought three large pieces. During a brief break with music, he designed album covers that have become collectibles. In 1974, Aute won first prize for painting in the XXVIII Mostra Michetti in Italy. His work was featured in galleries and museums all over Europe.

=== Film ===
Aute's interest in film showed up early in his life. In 1961, he created Senses, a short film. In 1970, he wrote and directed another short film, Minutos después, which was selected for the II festival de Cine de Autor de Benalmádena. In 1974 he wrote and directed A flor de piel, his last short film for over ten years.

=== Poetry ===
Although he'd written poetry in both English and Spanish as a youth, Aute made a big splash in 1970 when he published a poem and drawing in Poesia 70 that managed to get the magazine shut down in conservative, Franco-controlled Spain. In 1975, he publishedLa matemática del espejo and followed it up a year later with "Songs and Poems." In 1978, he published La liturgia del desorden.

==== 1980 and 1990s ====
===== Music =====
In 1980, Aute began a long musical association with Luis Mendo, who arranged many of his songs. In 1983, Aute performed in a concert, "Entre Amigos", with Silvio Rodríguez, Pablo Milanés, Teddy Bautista, and Joan Manuel Serrat. The concert, held in the Teatro Salamanca in Madrid, was recorded live.

The prize-winning album resulting from the concert was a huge hit in both Spain and Latin America. In 1984, he released "Cuerpo a cuerpo", the first time he combined his music and art thematically. In 1992, "Slowly" climbed the charts and was followed one year later by Mano a Mano with Silvio Rodriguez.

===== Art =====
In the 1980s, Aute's work was exhibited in galleries and shows all over Europe. In 1987, he combined an album, "Templo", with an art exhibit. He followed this pattern with a successful tour of Latin America and Spain with an exhibit called Ad Libidum in the mid-1990s.

===== Film =====
In 1986, Aute wrote and directed El muro de las lamentaciones; it was followed by La pupila del éxtasis, several years later.

===== Poetry =====
In 1980, he put out a revised edition of Songs and Poems. Six years later, he released "Templo de carne". Along the way, he developed a type of poetry he calls "poemigas", short poems that often feature plays on words. He also developed a series called Animal, which combined poetry, art, and music.

==== 2000 to 2020 ====
===== Music =====
In 2000, a number of Aute's peers produced a tribute album called "Mira que eres canalla, Aute" as a tribute to him. Fifteen years later, another generation of musicians released a second tribute, Giraluna. Aute continued his successful practice of combining music and art, adding poetry and film to the mix as well.

In 2001, he was awarded the Premio Luigi Tenco for his body of work. In 2003, he released Alas and Balas, his first album in four years and "Auterretratos," a collection of his work that was completed later with "Auterretratos Volumes Two and Three." In 2012, he released El niño que miraba el mar, an animated film, scored by Aute himself, that also featured his own drawings.

In 2015, Aute released Canciones de Amor y Destrucción, an album he combined with 3D art work and toured with Giraluna, a concert featuring a short film animated and produced by Aute.

===== Art =====
The 21st century brought a new twist to his work with a film called Un perro llamado Dolor. Aute created over 4,000 drawings to animate the film. He also toured with an exhibit called "Transfiguraciones" that had venues in Cuba, Spain, Colombia, Ecuador, and Italy between 2004 and 2010. This was followed by a retrospective of his work in Zaragoza. Rarely has a year gone by since his first exhibit in 1960 without an Aute show somewhere in the world.

===== Film =====
In 2001, Aute released Un perro llamado Dolor, an animated film that he wrote, directed, and scored. The firm was featured in the film festivals of San Sebastian, Valladolid, Havana, and Tribeca (in the United States) as well as other venues. This successful format was followed by El niño y el basilisco and Giraluna.

===== Poetry =====
In 2002, Aute released "Volver al agua," a compilation of his work. This was followed by "What Things Are" in 2005. He has continued throughout his career to combine poetry with other art forms.

== Discography ==
- Diálogos de Rodrigo y Gimena (RCA-Victor, 1968)
- 24 Canciones Breves (1967–68) (RCA-Victor, 1968)
- Álbum 1966-67 (1972)
- Rito (Ariola, 1973)
- Espuma (Ariola, 1974)
- Babel (Ariola, 1975)
- Sarcófago (Ariola, 1976)
- Forgesound (Ariola, 1977)
- Albanta (Ariola, 1978)
- De Par en Par (Ariola, 1979)
- Alma (Movieplay, 1980)
- Fuga (Movieplay, 1981)
- Entre Amigos (Movieplay, 1983)
- Cuerpo a Cuerpo (Ariola, 1984)
- Nudo (Ariola, 1985)
- 20 Canciones de Amor y un Poema Desesperado (Ariola, 1986)
- Templo (Ariola, 1987)
- Segundos Fuera (Ariola, 1989)
- Ufff! (Ariola, 1991)
- Slowly (Ariola, 1992)
- Mano a Mano (Ariola, 1993)
- Alevosía (Virgin, 1995)
- Paseo por el amor y el deseo (Ariola, 1996)
- Aire/Invisible (Virgin, 1998)
- Querencias (Virgin, 2001)
- Alas y Balas (Virgin, 2003)
- Auterretratos Vol. 1 (BMG Ariola, 2003)
- Auterretratos Vol. 2 (BMG Ariola, 2005)
- A día de hoy (BMG Ariola, 2007)
- Humo y azar (Sony Music, 2007)
- Auterretratos 3 (BMG Ariola, 2009)
- Intemperie (Sony Music, 2010)
- El niño que miraba el mar (Sony Music, 2012)
- Canciones de amor y destrucción (Legacy, 2015)

=== Singles ===
- Don Ramón / Made in Spain (RCA-Victor, 1967)
- Aleluya nº 1 / Rojo sobre negro (RCA-Victor, 1967)
- Al-leluia nº1 / Roig damunt el (negro) (RCA-Victor, 1967)
- Mi tierra, mi gente / Los ojos (RCA-Victor, 1968)
- Los burgueses / Me miraré en tu cuerpo (RCA-Victor, 1968)
- Clamo al firmamento (Aleluya nº 2) / Ausencia / Labrador (RCA-Victor, 1968)
- Yo pertenezco / Dónde estará la verdad (RCA-Victor, 1968)
- Tiempo de amores / Sí, sí, señor (RCA-Victor, 1968)

== Poem books ==
- La matemática del espejo (Edició Ángel Caffarena, Málaga, 1975)
- Canciones y poemas (Demófilo, 1976)
- La liturgia del desorden (Hiperión, Madrid, 1978)
- Canciones (Hiperión, Madrid, 1980. Edición revisada, 1988)
- Templo de carne (1986)
- Canciones 2 (Hiperión, Madrid, 1991)
- Animal (Disco-libro) (Editorial El Europeo/Allegro, Madrid, 1994)
- Animal Dos (Libro-Vídeo) (Plaza/Janés, Madrid, 1999)
- Cuerpo del delito. Canciones (1966–1999) (Celeste, Madrid, 1999)
- Volver al agua. Poesía completa (1970–2002) (Sial, Colección Contrapunto, Madrid, 2002)

== Filmography ==
- Senses (cortometraje, 1961)
- Minutos después (cortometraje, 1970)
- Chapuza 1 (1971)
- A flor de piel, (cortometraje, 1975)
- In Memoriam (1977)
- El vivo retrato
- El muro de las lamentaciones, (cortometraje, 1986)
- La pupila del éxtasis (1989)
- Un perro llamado Dolor (2001)
- El nino y el basilisco (2012)
- Giraluna (2015)
