= Lope Sarreal =

Filpino boxing promoter and manager (born 1905)

Lope Sarreal Sr.
- Born: September 25, 1905; Imus, Cavite, Philippines
- Died: March 14, 1995 (aged 89)
- Occupations: Boxing promoter Boxing manager Matchmaker
- Years active: 1961 – 1964

Lope Sarreal Sr. (born September 25, 1905 – March 14, 1995), commonly known as Papa, is a renowned Filipino boxing promoter and manager, He is the founder of Interphil Promotions Inc., a standalone professional boxing promotional company. He played a significant role in shaping the careers of numerous world-class boxers. He was also credited with popularizing big-time boxing in Asian countries like China, Indonesia, Thailand, Japan, and Korea, opening up new market for the sport. Sarreal was inducted into the International Boxing Hall of Fame as part of the class of 2005.

== Early life and career ==
Sarreal was a musician when World War II broke out and was incarcerated in a POW camp in Shanghai by the Imperial Japanese Armed Forces with captive American soldiers. He was the only Filipino in the camp and probably the most popular inmate as a cook. After the war, his American friends encouraged him to engage in trading surplus goods in Japan. That led to Sarreal opening a restaurant and trading company in Tokyo. Then, boxing began to boom in Japan and Sarreal jumped aboard the bandwagon, bringing Filipino fighters over in the 1950s. Known as the "Grand Old Man of Philippine Boxing" Sarreal produced 22 world titleholders, including a fighter and his own son-in-law Gabriel Elorde. Before long, Sarreal was totally immersed in boxing and his savvy paved the way for global recognition as a promoter.

Besides his influence in Asian boxing, he socialised with the likes of The Ring Magazine founder Nat Fleischer, promoters George Parnassus and Dewey Fraggeta, and boxers including Jack Dempsey, Rocky Marciano, Archie Moore, Barney Ross and Willie Pep.

== Notable client list ==
Some of the fighters who were previously represented by Sarreal Sr. include:

- (Philippines) Flash Elorde
- (Japan) Masao Ohba
- (Thailand) Saensak Muangsurin
- (Philippines) Erbito Salavarria
- (Philippines) Rolando Bohol
- (Philippines) Dindo Canoy
- (Mexico) Ricardo Arredondo
- (Philippines) Bernabe Villacampo
- (Thailand) Charchai Chinoi
- (Thailand) Venice Borkhorsor
- (Thailand) Netrnoi Sor Vorasingh
- (Thailand) Berkrerk Charvanchai

== Boxing Hall of Fame ==
Filipinos in the International Boxing Hall of Fame

Number	Name	Year inducted	Notes
1	Flash Elorde	1993	NBA Super featherweight (130), The Ring Super Featherweight (130), & WBC Super featherweight (130) Champion. the first Filipino boxer who ever inducted on the International Boxing Hall of Fame. Holds the record at super featherweight division for longest title reign, spanning seven years. "Modern inductee"
2	Pancho Villa	1994	NYSAC Flyweight (112), NBA Flyweight (112), The Ring Flyweight (112) Champion. First Filipino/Asian World Champion. "Old-timer inductee"
3	Lope Sarreal	2005	Asia's leading promoter, manager, and international booking agent in the years that followed World War II. Also Known as the "Grand Old Man of Philippine Boxing" produced 22 world champions during his illustrious career."Non-participants"
4	Manny Pacquiao	2025	First and only boxer to win twelve major world titles in eight different weight divisions –Flyweight (112), Super bantamweight (122), Featherweight (126), Super featherweight (130), Lightweight (135), Light welterweight (140), Welterweight (147) & Super welterweight (154), his achievements remain unparallel in the history of boxing. Also became the oldest welterweight champion in 2019 with a win against WBA champ Keith Thurman."Modern inductee"

= Indicates the person is no longer alive
