= Mano a Mano (Silvio Rodríguez and Luis Eduardo Aute album) =

Live album by Luis Eduardo Aute and Silvio Rodríguez
- Released: 1994
- Recorded: September 24, 1993
- Venue: Las Ventas
- Genre: Nueva canción
- Label: Ariola

Mano a Mano is a collaboration album by the singer-songwriters Luis Eduardo Aute and Silvio Rodríguez, from Spain and Cuba respectively.

It was recorded live in Madrid at Plaza de Toros de las Ventas on September 24, 1993.

== Track listing ==
=== Disc 1 ===
1. "Anda" (Luis Eduardo Aute)
2. "De alguna Manera" (Luis Eduardo Aute)
3. "Las Cuatro y Diez" (Luis Eduardo Aute)
4. "Qué Hago Ahora (Dónde Pongo lo Hallado)" (Silvio Rodríguez)
5. "Monólogo" (Silvio Rodríguez)
6. "El Necio" (Silvio Rodríguez)
7. "Dos o Tres Segundos de Ternura" (Luis Eduardo Aute)
8. "Queda la Música" (Luis Eduardo Aute)
9. "La Maza" (Silvio Rodríguez)
10. "Óleo de Mujer con Sombrero" (Silvio Rodríguez)
11. "Rabo de Nube" (Silvio Rodríguez)
12. "Dentro" (Luis Eduardo Aute)
13. "El Universo" (Luis Eduardo Aute)
14. "La Gota de Rocío" (Silvio Rodríguez)

=== Disc 2 ===
1. "Sin tu Latido" (Luis Eduardo Aute)
2. "Pequeña Serenata Diurna" (Silvio Rodríguez)
3. "Con un Beso por Fusil" (Luis Eduardo Aute)
4. "Sueño con Serpientes" (Silvio Rodríguez)
5. "Cada Vez Que Me amas" (Luis Eduardo Aute)
6. "Te Doy una canción" (Silvio Rodríguez)
7. "La Belleza" (Luis Eduardo Aute)
8. "Ojalá" (Silvio Rodríguez)
9. "Al Alba" (Luis Eduardo Aute)
10. "Unicornio/Albanta" (Silvio Rodríguez y Luis Eduardo Aute)

== Credits ==
- Music & Lyrics: Silvio Rodríguez y Luis Eduardo Aute.
- Chorus & Electric guitar: Alicia Alemán.
- Bass: Marcelo Fuentes.
- Keyboard: Luis Lozano.
- Chorus and Acoustic guitars: Luis Mendo.
- Electric & Acoustic guitars, musical direction: Gonzálo Lasheras.
- Acoustic & Spanish guitars, accidental drums: Suso Sainz.
- Mixed in "Eurosonic" (Madrid): José Luis Crespo, Gonzálo Lasheras & Suso Sainz.
- Mixing assistant: Miguel Ángel Morales.
- Digital cut: José Luis Crespo.
- Graphic design & photos: Manuel S. Alcantara.
