= Suntukan =

Filipino martial arts

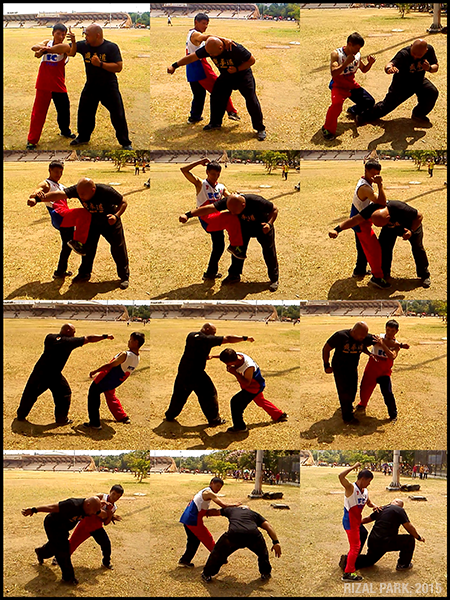
- Mano-mano "panantukan" with locks, trips, knees, throws and elbows
- Also known as: Pangamot, Mano-mano, Tumbukan. Foreign terms: Filipino Dirty Boxing, Dirty Boxing, Kali Empty Hand, Panantukan, Panununtukan
- Focus: Depends, but mostly striking, trapping, and grappling
- Country of origin: Philippines
- Creator: Unknown
- Famous practitioners: Eduard Folayang, Gabriel "Flash" Elorde, Francisco "Pancho Villa" Guilledo, Ceferino Garcia, Estaneslao "Tanny" del Campo, Buenaventura "Kid Bentura" Lucaylucay, Dan Inosanto, Anderson Silva
- Parenthood: Originally Arnis but in modern times, may include boxing, judo and jujutsu
- Ancestor arts: Arnis
- Descendant arts: Yaw-Yan
- Related arts: Arnis
- Olympic sport: No

Suntukan in everyday Filipino or Tagalog speech refers to a fistfight or brawl. In the context of Westernized, systematized Filipino martial arts, it refers to the fist-related striking component of unarmed combat.

In the central Philippine island region of Visayas, other generic terms for fistfighting or brawling which are thus reappropriated for a formal martial arts context include Pangamot or Pakamot and Sumbagay.

The Spanish-derived term Mano-mano also exists, referring to hand to hand, one on one combat.

A particular systematized approach to Filipino unarmed combat is often referred to in Western martial arts circles of Inosanto lineage as Panantukan, and thus treated as a term for a generalized concept of Filipino martial arts, but it is not an authentic Filipino term. It is more broad than literal suntukan or punch-based fighting as generically understood, as it includes locks, trips, knees, throws and elbows.

Although panantukan or suntukan in this context is also called Filipino Boxing, this article pertains to the Filipino martial art and should not be confused with the Western sport of boxing as practiced in the Philippines (in Filipino, boksing).

== Etymology ==
The term suntukan comes from the Tagalog word for punch, suntok. It is the general Filipino term for a fistfight or brawl regardless whether the involved had background in martial arts or not as in "suntukan sa Ace hardware" ("brawl at Ace hardware"). The Visayan terms (also found in Waray and Hiligaynon entries) pangamot and pakamot come from the word for hand, "kamót", the word pangamot is also used to refer to anything done by hand, making it a rough translation for doing things manually. Due to Cebuano language pronunciation quirks, they are also pronounced natively as pangamut and pakamut, thus the variation of spelling across literature. The Cebuano, Hiligaynon, and Waray Visayan word (or at least sometimes referred to) for "punching" is sumbag, though the word suntok, is also listed as a Visayan entry, (in Hiligaynon it is listed as "to thrust"). Therefore the word sumbagay in the Visayan languages is a term to refer to any kind of fistfight or brawl.

Mano-mano comes from the Spanish term mano a mano, as the Spanish word for "hand" is mano, so it translates to "hand-to-hand" often with the implication of "one-on-one". The similar phrases "Ano, mano-mano na lang, o?" and "Ano, suntukan na lang, o?" (both loosely "What now, why don't we [i.e. the two of us] just settle this with fists, huh?") are often used to end arguments when tempers have flared in Philippine male society.

Panantukan (often erroneously referred to as panantuken by USA practitioners due to the way Americans pronounce the letters U and A) is a contraction of the Tagalog term pananantukan, according to Dan Inosanto. It is generally attributed to the empty hands and boxing system infused by FMA pioneers Juan "Johnny" Lacoste, Leodoro "Lucky" Lucaylucay and Floro Villabrille into the Filipino martial arts component of the Inosanto Academy and Jeet Kune Do fighting systems developed in the West Coast of the United States. "Pananantukan", which Inosanto picked up from his Visayan elder instructors, is itself a corruption of the proper spelling and pronunciation panununtukan, which is still ultimately derived from suntok (punch). But while grammatically correct, panununtukan is more of a constructed term and not everyday language unlike the more common suntukan or other terms like sapakan (from sapak, another Filipino word for punch). If panununtukan means "the art of punching/fistfighting/brawling", panununtok meaning "punching (someone)" is more often seen in Philippine news media referring to cases of physical assault. Panantukan and its sister term pananjakman which denotes a kicking-based martial art (derived from Tagalog and Filipino tadyak, a word for kick; a more grammatically correct constructed equivalent would be pananadyakan; an everyday language form more akin to suntukan is sipaan from sipa as another word for kick, and "suntukan at sipaan" are often paired to describe brawls as literally "punching and kicking") are not used in the Philippines itself, nor is there a separate tradition of a kicking martial art alongside suntukan punching, as these terms originate with the Filipino-American martial artist community in the wider Filipino diaspora.

While the Tagalog of Inosanto's instructors was not perfect (Lacoste was Waray and the Filipino language based on Tagalog was relatively new when they migrated to the United States), they were highly versed in Filipino martial arts. It is said that originally, Lucaylucay wanted to call his art Suntukan, but he was concerned that it would be confused with Shotokan Karate, so he used the term Panantukan instead.

Filipino Boxing is a contemporary westernized term used by a few instructors to describe panantukan.

== History ==
The main source of this section is taken from a book written by Krishna Godhania entitled: Eskrima: Filipino Martial Art. It is possible that prior to colonization there was an existing unarmed fighting system which was most likely an indigenous form of wrestling though it is arguable whether it was a martial art or not because it was not systemized or formalized. According to the author, Doce Pares grandmaster Eulogio Cañete said that a certain book entitled De los Delitos ("For the Criminals") which was said to be published in 1800 and written by a certain Don Baltazar Gonzales, made or contained references to an empty hand fighting system. Another instructor, Abner Pasa, then said that the copy of the book that Cañete saw was destroyed during World War II and is now lost. However, so far there are no entries in Spanish dictionaries from the 17th to the 19th centuries listing a name for a kind of unarmed fighting as either a sport or a separate fighting system, nor did the chroniclers mention or record anything about a codified system of combat, both armed and unarmed, as well as their training methods. It is also worth mentioning that as early as the 1930s there are already many Filipinos who had background in Japanese martial arts like judo and jujutsu. The author then postulates that the origin of suntukan as a martial art today is said to be traceable to the introduction of Western Boxing in the country, which was already a codified sport. When boxing became a popular sport in the 20th century in the Philippines, Filipinos incorporated mainly knife-fighting techniques (some base their movements on double stick) with Western Boxing and some elements of Japanese martial arts that made suntukan a martial art rather than just being a give-all brawl.

This is different from the unarmed martial art traditionally practiced in the Southern Philippines as it is more influenced by Malays and Chinese and often do not teach Luzon and Visayan martial artists their own style of fighting for political reasons, thus their martial art cannot be considered as a "Filipino" martial art, just as their culture cannot be considered "Filipino" lest a controversy will spark.

== Characteristics ==
=== Striking ===
"Filipinos had their own sort of boxing, a bare-handed martial art known as Suntukan. The combatants held their hands high and kept their distance, occasionally charging forward to throw chopping punches, most of which would be fouls not tolerated in American rings."

— Don Stradley, ESPN journalist

Suntukan is not a sport, but rather a street-oriented fighting system. The techniques have not been adapted for safety or conformance to a set of rules for competition, thus it has a reputation as "dirty street fighting". It mainly consists of upper-body striking techniques such as punches, elbows, headbutts, shoulder strikes and limb destruction. It is often used in combination with Sikaran, the kicking aspect of Filipino fighting which includes low-line kicks, tripping and knee strikes to the legs, shins, and groin. Many of its other unique movesets include elbow blocks, hand strikes resembling Eskrima movements and other chopping strikes, evasive maneuvers, and parrying stances.

Suntukan practitioners typically use triangular footwork to avoid getting hit and look for openings, just like with knife fighting. According to Filipino martial artist Lucky Lucaylucay: "...if your practice is based on knife fighting, you have to become much more sophisticated with your footwork, evasions and delivery because one wrong move could mean death... ...Filipino boxing is exactly like knife fighting, except instead of cutting with a blade, we strike with a closed fist."

=== Grappling ===
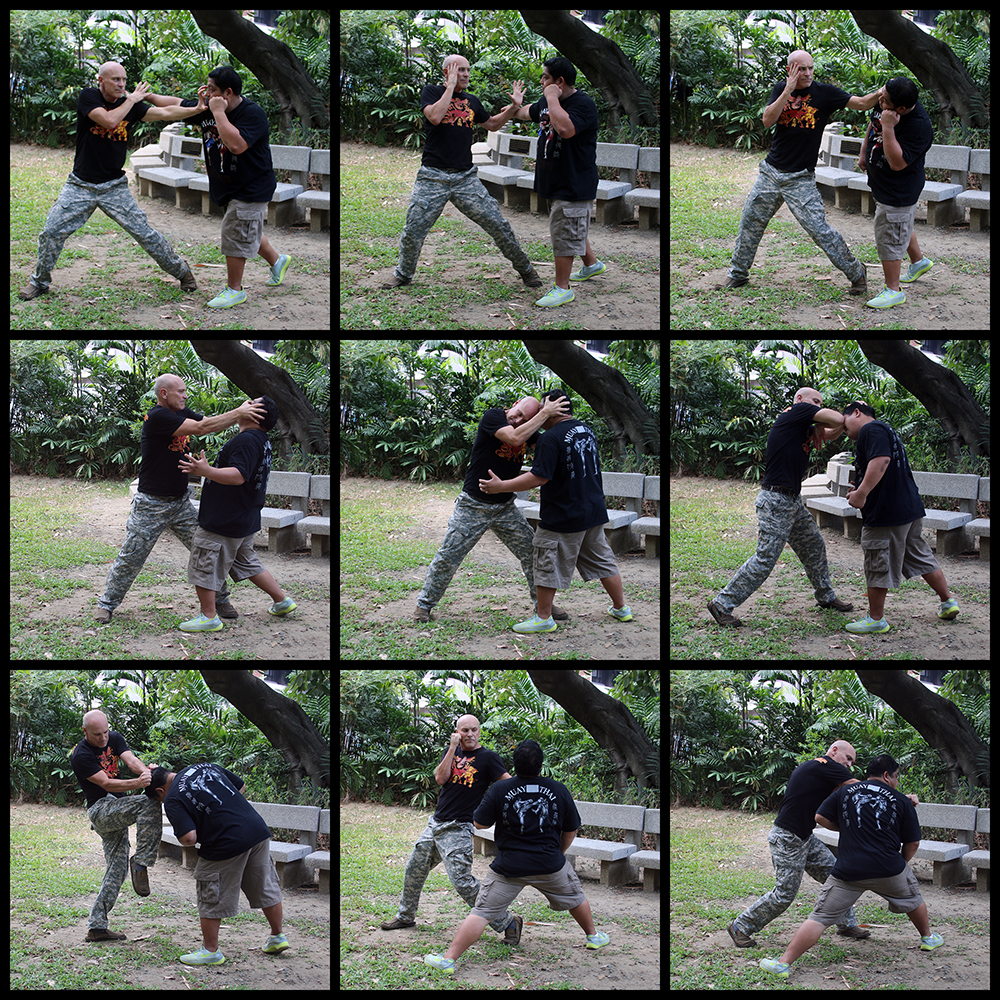
Panantukan dirty fighting techniques

Suntukan also consists of limb trapping and immobilization, including the technique called gunting (scissors) because of the scissor-like motions used to stop an opponent's limb from one side while attacking from the other side. Suntukan focuses on countering an opponent's strike with techniques that will nullify further attack by hitting certain bones and other areas to cause damage of the attacking limb. Common limb destructions include guiding incoming straight punches into the defending fighter's elbow (siko) to shatter the knuckles.

Dumog or Filipino wrestling is also an essential component of Suntukan. This type of wrestling is based on the concept of "control points" or "choke points" on the human body, which are manipulated – for example: by grabbing, pushing, pulling – in order to disrupt the opponent's balance and to keep him off balance. This also creates opportunities for close quarter striking using head butts, knees, forearms and elbows. This is accomplished by the use of arm wrenching, shoving, shoulder ramming, and other off-balancing techniques in conjunction with punches and kicks. For example, the attacker's arm could be grabbed and pulled downward to expose their head to a knee strike.

=== Weaponry ===
Even though suntukan is designed to allow an unarmed practitioner to engage in both armed and unarmed confrontations, it easily integrates the use of weapons such as knives, palmsticks (dulo y dulo) and ice picks. These weapons can render suntukan's techniques fatal but do not fundamentally change how the techniques are executed. Weapons in suntukan tend to be small, easily concealed and unobtrusive. Thus, suntukan minimizes contact with the opponent because it is not always known whether an opponent is armed, and knives are very often used in fights and brawls in the Philippines. As such, parries and deflections are preferred over blocks and prolonged grappling.

Suntukan is a key component of Arnis and is generally believed to have evolved from the latter. It is theorized to have evolved from Filipino weapons fighting because in warfare, unarmed fighting is usually a method of last resort for when combatants are too close in proximity (such as trapping and grappling range) or have lost their weapons. Aside from this, some unarmed techniques and movements in certain Eskrima systems are directly derived from their own weapon-based forms. In some classical Eskrima systems, the terms Arnis de Mano, De Cadena (Spanish for "of chain") and Cadena de Mano (Spanish for "hand chain") are the names for their empty hand components. Aside from punching, the suntukan components in Eskrima includes kicking, locking, throwing and dumog (grappling).

== Usage in sports ==
A number of Filipino boxing champions have practiced eskrima and suntukan. While many Filipino boxing champions such as Estaneslao "Tanny" del Campo and Buenaventura "Kid Bentura" Lucaylucay (Lucky Lucaylucay's father) practiced Olympic and sport boxing, they also used pangamot dirty street boxing which is distinct from western boxing.

World champion Ceferino Garcia (regarded as having introduced the bolo punch to the Western world of boxing) wielded a bolo knife in his youth and developed his signature punch from his experience in cutting sugarcane in farm fields with the bladed implement. He himself honed his suntukan in the streets, becoming a known unbeatable street fighter due to his skills. Legendary world champion Gabriel "Flash" Elorde studied Balintawak Eskrima (under founder Venancio "Anciong" Bacon) and got his innovative, intricate footwork from his father, "Tatang" Elorde who was the Eskrima champion of Cebu. Elorde's style was said to have been adopted by many boxers, including his friend Muhammad Ali.

Famous and influential suntukan practitioners in boxing and mixed martial arts include:

- Ceferino Garcia
- Gabriel Elorde
- Onassis Parungao - First Filipino fighter in the UFC who studied Arnis de Mano
- Eduard Folayang
- Anderson Silva

== See also ==
- History of boxing in the Philippines
- Filipino Martial Arts
- Eskrima
- Sikaran
- Dumog
- Kuntaw
- Kinamutay
