= List of 3150Fight events =

List of 3150FIGHT events is a list of events held and scheduled by the 3150FIGHT promotion, a professional boxing promotion based in Japan. The first event in the 3150FIGHT series is 3150FIGHT! vol. 1: Rikiishi vs. Gasca held on December 16, 2021 in Osaka, Japan.

3150FIGHT (sometimes and currently referred to as Saikou) promotion and series based in Osaka, Japan is founded by 3-time boxing world champion and Kameda Promotions president Kōki Kameda. Kameda built the promotion and series intending to "revive best boxing in Japan." Their broadcasting partner is Abema. In August 2024, 3150FIGHT merged with LUSHBOMU to form "3150XLushBomu", later it was renamed to "SaikouXLush"

== Overview ==
3150FIGHT events are separated into four different formats:

- "3150FIGHT" events are the standard and default format of 3150FIGHT events.
- "3150FIGHT SURVIVAL" events are 3150FIGHT's survival series that focuses on improving "midcard" boxers and prospects.
- "Benkei FIGHT" events are events that is based of and honours Japanese warrior monk Benkei. These events aim to build up up-and-comers and lower-level fighters.
- Unified with LushBomu promotion, are events that combines boxing with music, fashion, art and food. Three names:
  - LushBomu feat. 3150FIGHT
  - 3150XLushBomu
  - SaikouXLush

== List of events ==
No.	Event	Date	Venue	Location
1	3150FIGHT vol. 1	December 16, 2021	Mielparque Hall	Osaka, Japan
2	3150FIGHT vol. 2	April 29, 2022	Mielparque Hall	Osaka, Japan
3	3150FIGHT SURVIVAL vol. 0	May 14, 2022	176BOX	Toyonaka, Japan
4	3150FIGHT vol. 3	August 14, 2022	Edion Arena	Osaka, Japan
5	3150FIGHT SURVIVAL vol. 1	September 17, 2022	Mielparque Hall	Osaka, Japan
6	3150FIGHT SURVIVAL vol. 3 Pt. 1	November 27, 2022	176BOX	Toyonaka, Japan
7	3150FIGHT SURVIVAL vol. 3 Pt. 2	November 27, 2022	176BOX	Toyonaka, Japan
8	3150FIGHT vol. 4	January 6, 2023	Edion Arena	Osaka, Japan
9	3150FIGHT SURVIVAL Vol. 4	April 1, 2023	Edion Arena	Osaka, Japan
10	3150FIGHT vol. 5	April 16, 2023	Yoyogi #2 Gymnasium	Tokyo, Japan
11	3150FIGHT SURVIVAL vol. 5	June 10, 2023	Edion Arena	Osaka, Japan
12	3150FIGHT SURVIVAL vol. 6	June 10, 2023	Edion Arena	Osaka, Japan
13	3150FIGHT SURVIVAL vol. 7	July 20, 2023	Korakuen Hall	Tokyo, Japan
14	3150FIGHT vol. 6	August 11, 2023	Edion Arena	Osaka, Japan
15	3150FIGHT SURVIVAL vol. 8	September 3, 2023	Convex Okayama	Okayama, Japan
16	3150FIGHT vol. 7	October 7, 2023	Ota City General Gymnasium	Tokyo, Japan
17	BenkeiFIGHT vol. 1	February 23, 2024	176BOX	Toyonaka, Japan
18	3150FIGHT vol. 8	March 31, 2024	Nagoya International Conference Hall	Nagoya, Japan
19	LushBomu vol. 3 feat. 3150FIGHT	May 4, 2024	Edion Arena	Osaka, Japan
20	Benkei FIGHT vol. 2	June 30, 2024	Abeno Ward Center	Osaka, Japan
21	3150FIGHT vol. 9	July 28, 2024	Shiga Daihatsu Arena	Ōtsu, Japan
22	LushBomu feat. 3150FIGHT	August 24, 2024	Yamato Arena	Suita, Japan
23	3150XLushBomu vol. 2	October 12, 2024	Aichi Sky Expo	Tokoname, Japan
24	Benkei FIGHT vol. 3	November 10, 2024	Edion Arena	Osaka, Japan
25	3150XLushBomu vol. 3	December 21, 2024	Twin Messe	Shizuoka, Japan
26	Benkei FIGHT vol. 4	February 24, 2025	Abeno Ward Center	Osaka, Japan
27	3150XLushBomu vol. 4	March 29, 2025	Aichi Sky Expo	Tokoname, Japan
28	3150XLushBomu vol. 5	March 30, 2025	Aichi Sky Expo	Tokoname, Japan
29	3150XLushBomu vol. 6	May 24, 2025	Intex Osaka	Osaka, Japan
30	Benkei FIGHT vol. 5	June 14, 2025	Archaic Hall	Amagasaki, Japan
31	Benkei FIGHT vol. 6	July 6, 2025	176BOX	Toyonaka, Japan
32	3150XLushBomu vol. 7	July 20, 2025	Bishkek Arena	Bishkek, Kyrgyzstan
33	SaikouXLush vol. 2	October 25, 2025	Bishkek Arena	Bishkek, Kyrgyzstan
34	SaikouXLush vol. 3	October 26, 2025	Bishkek Arena	Bishkek, Kyrgyzstan
35	Benkei FIGHT vol. 7	November 9, 2025	Edion Arena	Osaka, Japan
36	SaikouXLush vol. 4	December 27, 2025	Aichi Sky Expo	Tokoname, Japan
37	Benkei FIGHT vol. 8	March 1, 2026	176BOX	Toyonaka, Japan
38	Benkei FIGHT vol. 9	May 9, 2026	Archaic Hall	Amagasaki, Japan
39	3150FIGHT vol. 10	June 6, 2026	Aichi Sky Expo	Tokoname, Japan
40	Benkei FIGHT vol. 10	June 13, 2026	176BOX	Toyonaka, Japan
41	Benkei FIGHT vol. 11	July 12, 2026	176BOX	Toyonaka, Japan

== 2021 ==
=== 3150FIGHT! vol. 1: Rikiishi vs. Gasca ===
3150FIGHT! vol. 1: Rikiishi vs. Gasca
- Date: December 16, 2021
- Venue: Mielparque Hall, Osaka, Japan

Tale of the tape
Boxer	Masanori Rikiishi	Roli Gasca
Pre-fight record	9–1 (5 KO)	26–9–1 (9 KO)

Result
- Rikiishi wins via 4th-round RTD

Confirmed bouts:

Weight Class		vs.		Method	Round	Time	Notes
Lightweight	(Japan) Masanori Rikiishi	def.	(Philippines) Roli Gasca	RTD	4/8	3:00
Super flyweight	(Japan) Ryo Miyazaki	def.	(Japan) Takayuki Teraji	TKO	3/6	2:11
Lightweight	(Japan) Tomaya Hiwada	def.	(Japan) Jidai Miyamoto	MD	4	3:00
Welterweight	(Japan) Ruku Sasaki	def.	(Japan) Hayato Fukugawa	UD	4	3:00
Lightweight	(Japan) Hiroto Kojima	def.	(Japan) Shota Kitada	TKO	3/4	1:52
Bantamweight	(Japan) Masaya Asakura	def.	(Japan) Yuki Mizuta	TKO	3/4	0:56
Lightweight	(Japan) Masamichi Funahashi	def.	(Japan) Yuma Shiromizu	TKO	2/4	1:06
Light welterweight	(Japan) Hiroki Fukushige	def.	(United Kingdom) Aaron Theo Bailey	TKO	2/4	0:55

== 2022 ==
=== 3150FIGHT vol. 2 ===
3150FIGHT vol. 2
- Date: Apr 29, 2022
- Venue: Mielparque Hall, Osaka, Japan

Tale of the tape
Boxer	Ryo Miyazaki	Takumi Sakae
Pre-fight record	25–2–3 (16 KO)	22–4–1 (16 KO)

Result
- Miyazaki wins via 8-round unanimous decision (78–74 and 77–75 twice)

Confirmed bouts:

Weight Class		vs.		Method	Round	Time	Notes
Flyweight	(Japan) Ryo Miyazaki	def.	(Japan) Takumi Sakae	UD	8	3:00
Heavyweight	(Japan) Mitsuro Tajima	def.	(South Korea) Sang Ho Kim	TKO	1/8	0:56
Flyweight	(Japan) Ryoma Morimoto	def.	(Japan) Takuya Yoshida	TKO	3/4	1:54
Welterweight	(Japan) Ryuta Miyoshi	draw	(Japan) Hiroko Ikeda	MD	4	3:00
Lightweight	(Japan) Masamichi Funahashi	def.	(Japan) Arata Shimizu	UD	4	3:00
Bantamweight	(Japan) Masaya Asakura	def.	(Japan) Taiga Nagao	UD	4	3:00
Featherweight	(Japan) Kisei Takada	def.	(Japan) Vageta Ishikawa	TKO	1/4	2:05
Light welterweight	(Japan) Hiroki Fukushige	def.	(Japan) Hyuga Hidaka	TKO	1/4	0:46

=== 3150FIGHT SURVIVAL vol. 0 ===
3150FIGHT SURVIVAL vol. 0
- Date: May 14, 2022
- Venue: 176BOX, Toyonaka, Japan

Tale of the tape
Boxer	Kaito Yamasaki	Koshin Takeshima
Pre-fight record	2–0 (1 KO)	4–2–1 (3 KO)

Result
- Yamasaki wins via 8-round split decision (78–74, 77–76 and 75–77)

Confirmed bouts:

Weight Class		vs.		Method	Round	Time	Notes
Super featherweight	(Japan) Kaito Yamasaki	def.	(Japan) Konshin Takeshima	SD	8	3:00
Lightweight	(Japan) Majisuka Kosaka	def.	(Japan) Keita Hayashi	TKO	1/6	1:34
Lightweight	(Japan) Tomoya Hiwada	def.	(Japan) Takumi Kota	UD	4	3:00
Light flyweight	(Japan) Tatsuyoshi Miyachi	def.	(Japan) Koji Tajiri	TKO	1/4	2:21
Super bantamweight	(Japan) Hayato Tsujinaka	def.	(Japan) Tomoya Miura	SD	4	3:00

=== 3150FIGHT vol. 3 ===
3150FIGHT vol. 3
- Date: August 14, 2022
- Venue: Edion Arena, Osaka, Japan
- Title(s) on the line: South Korean and vacant Japanese heavyweight titles

Tale of the tape
Boxer	Mitsuro Tajima	Sung Min Lee
Pre-fight record	1–0 (1 KO)	7–2–1 (2 KO)

Result
- Tajima wins via 1st-round TKO

Confirmed bouts:

Weight Class		vs.		Method	Round	Time	Notes
Heavyweight	(Japan) Mitsuro Tajima	def.	(South Korea) Sung Min Lee (c)	TKO	1/10	1:09	For South Korean and vacant Japanese heavyweight titles
Super featherweight	(Japan) Masanori Rikiishi (c)	def.	(Philippines) Tomjune Mangunat	TKO	4/12	2:45	For OPBF super featherweight title
Super featherweight	(Philippines) Jeo Santisima	def.	(Japan) Hiroshige Osawa	TKO	5/8	1:56
Featherweight	(Japan) Sora Fukunaga	def.	(Japan) Kenya Yamashita	UD	8	3:00
Flyweight	(Panama) Azael Villar	def.	(Japan) Ryo Miyazaki	TKO	1/8	1:43
Lightweight	(Japan) Yoshiki Takahashi	def.	(Japan) Majisuka Kosaka	UD	6	3:00
Welterweight	(South Korea) Dae Hoon Kim	def.	(Japan) Mioto Noguchi	UD	4	3:00
Heavyweight	(Japan) Satoshi Ishii	def.	(Japan) Shuho Takayama	MD	4	3:00
Featherweight	(Japan) Bakuto Nakahara	def.	(Japan) Masaya Asakura	UD	4	3:00

=== 3150FIGHT SURVIVAL vol. 1 ===
3150FIGHT SURVIVAL vol. 1
- Date: September 17, 2022
- Venue: Mielparque Hall, Osaka Japan
- Title(s) on the line: Japanese super featherweight title

Tale of the tape
Boxer	Kosuke Saka	Tsubasa Narai
Pre-fight record	21–6 (19 KO)	8–1 (7 KO)

Result
- Saka wins via 6th-round TKO

Confirmed bouts:

Weight Class		vs.		Method	Round	Time	Notes
Super featherweight	(Japan) Kosuke Saka (c)	def.	(Japan) Tsubasa Narai	TKO	6/10	0:55	For Japanese super featherweight title
Featherweight	(Japan) Ryoichi Tamura	def.	(Japan) Toshiya Yokogawa	UD	8	3:00
Mini flyweight	(Japan) Mizuki Chimoto (c)	def.	(South Korea) Hye Soo Park	MD	8	2:00	For OPBF female mini flyweight title
Bantamweight	(Japan) Ryoma Morimoto	def.	(Japan) Ryoya Ogawa	TKO	1/4	1:30
Welterweight	(Japan) Ryuta Miyoshi	def.	(Japan) Yusa Toyonaka	TKO	1/4	2:20
Light flyweight	(Japan) Koji Tajiri	def.	(Japan) Rikuto Sakaguchi	TKO	1/4	0:58
Light welterweight	(Japan) Ran Ijuin	def.	(United Kingdom) Aaron Theo Bailey	MD	4	3:00
Light welterweight	(Japan) Hiroki Fukushige	def.	(Japan) Vageta Ishikawa	UD	4	3:00

=== 3150FIGHT SURVIVAL vol. 3 ===
==== Part 1 ====
3150FIGHT SURVIVAL vol.3 Pt. 1
- Date: November 27, 2022
- Venue: 176BOX, Toyonaka, Japan

Tale of the tape
Boxer	Koshin Takeshima	Satoru Hoshiba
Pre-fight record	4–3–1 (3 KO)	7–6 (2 KO)

Result
- Takeshima wins via 8-round unanimous decision (77–75 twice and 80–72)

Confirmed bouts:

Weight Class		vs.		Method	Round	Time	Notes
Super featherweight	(Japan) Koshin Takeshima	def.	(Japan) Satoru Hoshiba	UD	8	3:00
Super flyweight	(Japan) Ryo Miyazaki	def.	(Japan) Toma Kondo	SD	8	3:00
Welterweight	(Japan) Ryuta Miyoshi	def.	(Japan) Areji Kato	KO	2/6	2:07
Bantamweight	(Japan) Ren Kobayashi	def.	(Mongolia) Orkhontungalag Unubold	UD	5	3:00
Welterweight	(Japan) Ryota Nakagawa	def.	(Mongolia) Javkhlanbayar Sainchuluun	TKO	4/5	2:22
Welterweight	(Japan) Ruku Sasaki	def.	(Japan) Ren Matsuoka	UD	4	3:00
Super bantamweight	(Japan) Masaya Asakura	def.	(Japan) Takaumi Yokoyama	UD	4	3:00

==== Part 2 ====
3150FIGHT SURVIVAL vol.3 Pt. 2
- Date: November 27, 2022
- Venue: 176BOX, Toyonaka, Japan
- Title(s) on the line: Japanese heavyweight title

Tale of the tape
Boxer	Mitsuro Tajima	Nattapon Plangpimai or Singthong Kiatpracha
Pre-fight record	2–0 (2 KO)	16–3 (13 KO)

Result
- Tajima wins via 1st-round KO

Confirmed bouts:

Weight Class		vs.		Method	Round	Time	Notes
Heavyweight	(Japan) Mitsuro Tajima (c)	def.	(Thailand) Singthong Kiatpracha	KO	1/10	0:34	For Japanese heavyweight title
Super flyweight	(Japan) Keisuke Iwasaki	def.	(Japan) Yuto Nakamura	TKO	3/8	1:42
Lightweight	(Japan) Kazuki Higuchi	def.	(Japan) Ran Ijuin	UD	6	3:00
Mini flyweight	(Japan) Shione Ogata	def.	(Japan) Sana Hazuki	MD	6	2:00
Super bantamweight	(Japan) Yuji Saiki	def.	(Japan) Shugo Hisataka	MD	4	3:00
Flyweight	(Japan) Raiki Shimada	def.	(Japan) Koji Tojiri	UD	4	3:00
Super featherweight	(Japan) Shota Kitada	def.	(Japan) Hiroshi Goto	UD	4	3:00
Light welterweight	(Japan) Tomoya Hiwada	def.	(Japan) Arata Shimizu	TKO	1/4	2:57
Heavyweight	(Japan) Shuho Takayma	def.	(South Korea) Sung Tae Kwon	UD	4	3:00

== 2023 ==
=== 3150FIGHT vol. 4 ===
3150FIGHT vol. 4
- Date: January 6, 2023
- Venue: Edion Arena, Osaka, Japan
- Title(s) on the line: IBF mini flyweight title

Tale of the tape
Boxer	Daniel Valladares	Ginjiro Shigeoka
Pre-fight record	27–3–1 (15 KO)	8–0 (6 KO)

Result
- 3rd-round no contest

Confirmed bouts:

Weight Class		vs.		Method	Round	Time	Notes
Mini flyweight	(Mexico) Daniel Valladares (c)	vs.	(Japan) Ginjiro Shigeoka	NC	3/12	2:48	For IBF mini flyweight title; Valladares unable to continue due to accidental batting
Mini flyweight	(Philippines) Melvin Jerusalem	def.	(Japan) Masataka Taniguchi (c)	TKO	2/12	2:04	For WBO mini flyweight title
Super featherweight	(Japan) Masanori Rikiishi	def.	(Japan) Yoshimitsu Kimura (c)	KO	5/12	2:52	For WBO Asia Pacific super featherweight title
Flyweight	(Japan) Ayumu Hanada	def.	(Panama) Azael Villar	TKO	7/8	0:46
Featherweight	(Japan) Mugicha Nakagawa	def.	(Japan) Kenya Yamashita	TKO	5/8	2:48
Heavyweight	(Japan) Mitsuro Tajima	def.	(Thailand) Kajornsak Saikaew Boxing Camp	KO	1/8	1:15
Super featherweight	(Japan) Tsubasa Narai	def.	(Japan) Hiro Ichimichi	UD	6	3:00
Light welterweight	(Japan) Hiroshige Osawa	def.	(Japan) Kazuki Higuchi	UD	5	3:00
Super flyweight	(Japan) Ryoma Morimoto	def.	(Japan) Hiroki Shibano	TKO	2/4	1:33
Heavyweight	(Japan) Satoshi Ishii	draw	(South Korea) Chang Soo Han	MD	4	3:00

=== 3150FIGHT SURVIVAL vol. 4 ===
3150FIGHT SURVIVAL vol. 4
- Date: April 1, 2023
- Venue: Edion Arena, Osaka, Japan
- Title(s) on the line: WBO Asia Pacific bantamweight title

Tale of the tape
Boxer	Ryosuke Nishida	Songsaeng Phoyaem
Pre-fight record	6–0 (1 KO)	19–3 (12 KO)

Result
- Nishida wins via 12-round unanimous decision (120–107 thrice)

Confirmed bouts:

Weight Class		vs.		Method	Round	Time	Notes
Bantamweight	(Japan) Ryosuke Nishida (c)	def.	(Thailand) Songsaeng Phoyaem	UD	12	3:00	For WBO Asia Pacific bantamweight title
Super featherweight	(Japan) Yuna Hara	def.	(Japan) Kosuke Saka (c)	TKO	4/10	1:03	For Japanese super featherweight title
Super welterweight	(Japan) Rei Nakajima	def.	(Japan) Hisashi Kato	TKO	9/10	1:27	For vacant Japanese interim super welterweight title
Super flyweight	(Japan) Yasuhiro Kanzaki	def.	(Japan) Kyotaro Yoshida	UD	8	3:00
Bantamweight	(Japan) Yuto Nakamura	def.	(Japan) Ryo Miyazaki	TKO	4/8	2:07
Super flyweight	(Japan) Keisuke Iwasaki	draw	(Japan) Mirai Imagawa	MD	8	3:00
Lightweight	(Japan) Ran Ijuin	def.	(Japan) Yoshiki Takahashi	KO	6/6	2:07
Super flyweight	(Japan) Ryoma Morimoto	def.	(Japan) Sadayuki Yamada	KO	1/4	1:07
Lightweight	(Japan) Ryusei Miyagawa	def.	(Japan) Takafumi Nakamura	KO	1/4	2:33
Super featherweight	(Japan) Shota Kitada	def.	(Japan) Hayato Amami	UD	4	3:00
Light welterweight	(Japan) Hiroka Amaki	draw	(Japan) Hiroki Fukushige	MD	4	3:00

=== 3150FIGHT vol. 5 ===
3150FIGHT vol. 5
- Date: April 16, 2023
- Venue: Yoyogi #2 Gymnasium, Tolyo, Japan
- Title(s) on the line: inaugural IBF interim mini flyweight title

Tale of the tape
Boxer	Ginjiro Shigeoka	Rene Mark Cuarto
Pre-fight record	8–0, 1NC (6 KO)	21–3–2 (12 KO)

Result
- Shigeoka wins via 9th-round KO

Confirmed bouts:

Weight Class		vs.		Method	Round	Time	Notes
Mini flyweight	(Japan) Ginjiro Shigeoka	def.	(Philippines) Rene Mark Cuarto	KO	9/12	2:55	For inaugural IBF interim mini flyweight title
Mini flyweight	(Japan) Yudai Shigeoka	def.	(Puerto Rico) Wilfredo Méndez	KO	7/12	0:25	For vacant WBC interim mini flyweight title
Heavyweight	(Japan) Mitsuro Tajima	def.	(India) Naveen Verma	TKO	1/8	2:00
Super bantamweight	(Japan) Mugicha Nakagawa	def.	(Philippines) Robin Langres	TKO	5/8	1:34
Super featherweight	(Japan) Tsubasa Narai	def.	(Thailand) Arnon Yupang	UD	8	3:00
Super bantamweight	(Japan) Ren Kobayashi	draw	(Japan) Kenshin Hosokawa	MD	6	3:00
Light welterweight	(Japan) Kotaro Sekine	def.	(Japan) Ryuto Miyoshi	KO	2/6	2:59
Light flyweight	(Japan) Shuri Oka	def.	(Thailand) Suriya Phetrkhum	TKO	1/6	1:40

=== 3150FIGHT SURVIVAL vol. 5 ===
3150FIGHT SURVIVAL vol. 5
- Date: June 10, 2023
- Venue: Edion Arena, Osaka Japan
- Title(s) on the line: inaugural Japanese super middleweight title

Tale of the tape
Boxer	Tyson Koki	Yuki Nonaka
Pre-fight record	15–5–3 (1 KO)	35–11–3 (10 KO)

Result
- Koki wins via 8-round unanimous decision (98–92 and 97–93 twice)

Confirmed bouts:

Weight Class		vs.		Method	Round	Time	Notes
Super middleweight	(Japan) Tyson Koki	def.	(Japan) Yuki Nonaka	UD	10	3:00	For inaugural Japanese super middleweight title
Heavyweight	(Japan) Mitsuri Tajima	def.	(Venezuela) Jose Marin	UD	8	3:00
Light flyweight	(Japan) Yumemi Ikemoto	def.	(Japan) Shione Ogata	UD	6	2:00
Welterweight	(Japan) Rikuo Kurisu	def.	(Japan) Ryota Nakagawa	SD	6	3:00
Lightweight	(Japan) Masamichi Funahashi	def.	(Japan) Fumiako Sueyoshi	UD	6	3:00
Super flyweight	(Japan) Ryo Mandokoro	def.	(Thailand) Akkhaphon Ngamkaeo	TKO	1/6	1:01
Bantamweight	(Japan) Takane Nagaoka	def.	(Japan) Kazuki Utoo	UD	4	3:00
Bantamweight	(Japan) Yuta Uto	def.	(Japan) Shugo Hisataka	UD	4	3:00
Middleweight	(Japan) Kazuki Tominaga	def.	(Japan) Masato Nakaida	UD	4	3:00

=== 3150FIGHT SURVIVAL vol. 6 ===
3150FIGHT SURVIVAL vol. 6
- Date: June 10, 2023
- Venue: Edion Arena, Osaka, Japan

Tale of the tape
Boxer	Masanori Rikiishi	Ricardo Nunez
Pre-fight record	13–1 (8 KO)	23–5 (21 KO)

Result
- Rikiishi wins via 3rd-round KO

Confirmed bouts:

Weight Class		vs.		Method	Round	Time	Notes
Lightweight	(Japan) Masanori Rikiishi	def.	(Panama) Ricardo Nunez	KO	3/10	2:16
Lightweight	(Japan) Koshin Takeshima	def.	(Japan) Kazuki Higuchi	UD	8	3:00
Super flyweight	(Japan) Kyotaro Yoshida	def.	(Japan) Keisuke Iwasaki	UD	8	3:00
Super featherweight	(Japan) Tsubasa Narai	def.	(Thailand) Detchadin Sornsirisuphathin	TKO	2/8	1:31
Featherweight	(Japan) Kaishu Harada	def.	(Thailand) Sukpraserd Ponpitak	UD	6	3:00
Super featherweight	(Japan) Ran Ijuin	def.	(Japan) Aoi Saijo	TKO	5/6	2:34
Lightweight	(Japan) Keito Kizunishi	draw	(Japan) Taiyo Takashi	MD	4	3:00
Featherweight	(Japan) Yoshiki Fujisaki	def.	(Japan) Soshi Hattori	KO	3/4	1:08
Welterweight	(Japan) Hiroki Fukushige	def.	(Japan) Yusa Toyonaka	TKO	2/4	0:17

=== 3150FIGHT SURVIVAL vol. 7 ===
3150FIGHT SURVIVAL vol. 7
- Date: July 20, 2023
- Venue: Korakuen Hall, Tokyo, Japan

Tale of the tape
Boxer	Akihiro Kondo	Manuel Garcia
Pre-fight record	36–11–2 (21 KO)	16–1–1 (15 KO)

Result
- Kondo wins via 8-round unanimous decision (77–75 thrice)

Confirmed bouts:

Weight Class		vs.		Method	Round	Time	Notes
Welterweight	(Japan) Akihiro Kondo	def.	(Mexico) Manuel Garcia	UD	8	3:00
Featherweight	(Japan) Shingo Wake	def.	(Thailand) Kiattisak Thawisap	KO	2/8	2:16
Light welterweight	(Japan) Kotaro Sekine	def.	(South Korea) Jong Hee Lee	TKO	3/8	2:57
Super flyweight	(Japan) Hayate Hanada	def.	(India) Sandeep Kumar	TKO	1/6	2:17
Bantamweight	(Japan) Sho Nogami	def.	(South Korea) Hyun Mo Yang	TKO	1/6	2:33
Welterweight	(Japan) Kosei Nogami	def.	(South Korea) Hyeon Jun Lee	TKO	2/6	2:40
Light flyweight	(Japan) Temple Kamihara	def.	(Japan) Andy Atsushi	SD	6	3:00
Super featherweight	(Japan) Tatsuya Suga	def.	(Japan) Kosei Taniguchi	UD	4	3:00

=== 3150FIGHT vol. 6 ===
3150FIGHT vol. 6: Let's Hit the World!
- Date: August 11, 2023
- Venue: Edion Arena, Osaka, Japan

Tale of the tape
Boxer	Ryosuke Nishida	Christian Medina
Pre-fight record	7–0 (1 KO)	21–3 (14 KO)

Result
- Nishida wins via 12-round unanimous decision (116–112, 117–111 and 118–110)

Confirmed bouts:

Weight Class		vs.		Method	Round	Time	Notes
Bantamweight	(Japan) Ryosuke Nishida	def.	(Mexico) Christian Medina	UD	12	3:00
Featherweight	(Japan) Mugicha Nakagawa	draw	(Japan) Kyonosuke Kameda	SD	8	3:00
Super welterweight	(Puerto Rico) Jean Carlos Torres	def.	(Japan) Riku Nagahama	UD	8	3:00
Super bantamweight	(Japan) Sora Fukunaga	def.	(Japan) Takahiro Murai	UD	8	3:00
Heavyweight	(Japan) Mitsuro Tajima	def.	(Thailand) Nakhonchai Pantang	TKO	1/8	1:59
Featherweight	(Japan) Kyosuke Okamoto	def.	(Japan) Yoshiki Fujisaki	TKO	5/6	1:33
Super flyweight	(Japan) Ryo Mandokoro	def.	(Thailand) Weeranat Kuiwongtan	TKO	1/6	2:28
Welterweight	(Japan) Areji Kato	def.	(Japan) Hiroki Fukushige	MD	6	3:00

=== 3150FIGHT SURVIVAL vol. 8 ===
3150FIGHT SURVIVAL vol. 8
- Date: September 3, 2023
- Venue: Convex Okayama, Okayama, Japan

Tale of the tape
Boxer	Shingo Wake	Jose Velasquez
Pre-fight record	29–8–2 (21 KO)	32–8–3 (22 KO)

Result
- Wake wins via 8-round unanimous decision (78–74 thrice)

Confirmed bouts:

Weight Class		vs.		Method	Round	Time	Notes
Featherweight	(Japan) Shingo Wake	def.	(Chile) Jose Velasquez	UD	8	3:00
Super flyweight	(Japan) Yasuhiro Kanzaki	def.	(Japan) Keisuke Iwasaki	UD	8	3:00
Heavyweight	(Japan) Mitsuro Tajima	def.	(Thailand) Aekkaphob Auraiwan	TKO	8/8	2:59
Super featherweight	(Japan) Hiromu Murota	def.	(Japan) Masamichu Funahashi	TKO	5/6	1:55
Light flyweight	(Japan) Shuri Oka	def.	(Japan) Masatora Okada	UD	6	3:00
Heavyweight	(Japan) Shuho Takayama	def.	(South Korea) Sung Tae Kwon	TKO	4/4	2:13
Lightweight	(Japan) Keito Kizunishi	def.	(Japan) Kenshin Higuchi	UD	4	3:00

=== 3150FIGHT vol. 7 ===
3150FIGHT vol. 7
- Date: October 7, 2023
- Venue: Ota City General Gymnasium, Tokyo, Japan
- Title(s) on the line: WBC mini flyweight title

Tale of the tape
Boxer	Yudai Shigeoka	Panya Pradabsri
Pre-fight record	7–0 (5 KO)	40–1 (24 KO)

Result
- Shigeoka wins via unanimous decision (117–111 and 119–109 twice)

Confirmed bouts:

Weight Class		vs.		Method	Round	Time	Notes
Mini flyweight	(Japan) Yudai Shigeoka	def.	(Thailand) Panya Pradabsri (c)	UD	12	3:00	For WBC mini flyweight title
Mini flyweight	(Japan) Ginjiro Shigeoka	def.	(Mexico) Daniel Valladares (c)	TKO	5/12	2:15	For IBF mini flyweight title
Featherweight	(South Africa) Lerato Dlamini	def.	(Japan) Tomoki Kameda	SD	12	3:00
Mini flyweight	(Philippines) ArAr Andales	draw	(Puerto Rico) Wilfredo Méndez	TD	4/8	2:23	4-round TD draw rule
Super flyweight	(Mexico) Rene Calixto	def.	(Japan) Hayate Hanada	TKO	8/8	0:31
Heavyweight	(Japan) Mitsuri Tajima	def.	(Venezuela) Williams Ocando	KO	1/8	2:09
Super flyweight	(Japan) Sho Nogami	def.	(Thailand) Anantachai Duanyai	RTD	4/8	3:00
Super flyweight	(Japan) Ryo Mandokoro	def.	(Japan) Kyotaro Yoshida	SD	8	3:00

=== 3150FIGHT SURVIVAL vol. 9 (cancelled) ===
3150FIGHT SURVIVAL vol. 9
- Date: November 11, 2023
- Venue: Prefectural Budokan, Nagoya, Japan

Tale of the tape
Boxer	Masanori Rikiishi	Carlos Flores
Pre-fight record	14–1 (9 KO)	23–1 (13 KO)

Result
- Event cancelled

3150FIGHT's FIGHT SURVIVAL vol. 9 event was supposed to take place on November 11, 2023 at the Nagoya Prefectural Budokan, however on October 25, 2023, it would be cancelled due to Carlos Flores pulling out of his main event match against Masanori Rikiishi. Flores stated that his passport was stolen and therefore, he was unable to go to Japan. The promoters later decided to cancel the whole event.

Confirmed bouts:

Weight Class		vs.		Method	Round	Time	Notes
Super featherweight	(Japan) Masanori Rikiishi	vs.	(Mexico) Carlos Flores		– (10)		Flores lost his passport
Super flyweight	(Philippines) Kevin Jake Cataraja (c)	vs.	(Philippines) Jayr Raquinel		– (12)		For OPBF super flyweight title
Super flyweight	(Philippines) Esneth Domingo	vs.	(Japan) Keisuke Iwasaki		– (8)
Lightweight	(Japan) Koshin Takeshima	vs.	(Philippines) Ian Sampan		– (8)
Super featherweight	(Japan) Matcha Nakagawa	vs.	(Japan) Ran Ijuin		– (6)
Light welterweight	(Japan) Ei Go	vs.	(Japan) Ryuta Miyoshi		– (6)
Super welterweight	(Japan) Ruku Sasaki	vs.	(Japan) Kenta Kamimura		– (6)

== 2024 ==
=== Benkei FIGHT vol. 1 ===
Benkei FIGHT vol. 1
- Date: February 23, 2024
- Venue: 176BOX, Toyonaka, Japan

Tale of the tape
Boxer	Genki Yamashita	Hiroki Fukushige
Pre-fight record	4–4–2 (2 KO)	4–1–1 (3 KO)

Result
- Yamashita wins via 6-round split decision (56–58 and 58–56 twice)

Confirmed bouts:

Weight Class		vs.		Method	Round	Time	Notes
Light welterweight	(Japan) Genki Yamashita	def.	(Japan) Hiroki Fukushige	SD	6	3:00
Lightweight	(Japan) Tomoya Hiwada	def.	(Japan) Shido Arai	UD	6	3:00
Super featherweight	(Japan) Majisuka Kosaka	draw	(Japan) Toga Fukuhama	MD	6	3:00
Lightweight	(Japan) Ran Ijuin	def.	(Japan) Seiryu Yamana	MD	6	3:00
Super featherweight	(Japan) Masamuchi Funahashi	def.	(Japan) Bakuto Nakahara	SD	6	3:00
Flyweight	(Japan) Kohei Konishi	def.	(Japan) Koji Tajiri	UD	4	3:00

=== 3150FIGHT vol. 8 ===
3150FIGHT vol. 8
- Date: March 31, 2024
- Venue: International Conference Hall, Nagoya, Japan

Tale of the tape
Boxer	Tomoki Kameda	Kevin Villanueva
Pre-fight record	40–4 (22 KO)	22–5–3 (15 KO)

Result
- Kameda wins via 5th-round RTD

Confirmed bouts:

Weight Class		vs.		Method	Round	Time	Notes
Featherweight	(Japan) Tomoki Kameda	def.	(Mexico) Kevin Villanueva	RTD	5/10	3:00
Mini flyweight	(Philippines) Melvin Jerusalem	def.	(Japan) Yudai Shigeoka (c)	SD	12	3:00	For WBC mini flyweight title
Mini flyweight	(Japan) Ginjiro Shigeoka (c)	def.	(Philippines) Jake Amparo	KO	2/12	1:15	For IBF mini flyweight title
Middleweight	(Japan) Riku Kunimoto (c)	def.	(Japan) Eiki Kani	TKO	6/10	1:53	For Japanese and WBO Asia Pacific middleweight title
Heavyweight	(Romania) Alexandru Jur	def.	(Japan) Mitsuro Tajima	UD	8	3:00
Lightweight	(Japan) Ei Go	def.	(Japan) Koshin Takeshima	MD	8	3:00
Bantamweight	(Japan) Ryusei Moriwaki	def.	(Thailand) Pakphum Tawinram	TKO	2/6	1:07

=== LushBomu vol. 3 feat. 3150FIGHT ===
LushBomu vol. 3 feat. 3150FIGHT
- Date: May 4, 2024
- Venue: Edion Arena, Osaka, Japan
- Title(s) on the line: IBF bantamweight title

Tale of the tape
Boxer	Ryosuke Nishida	Emmanuel Rodríguez
Pre-fight record	8–0 (1 KO)	22–2, 1NC (13 KO)

Result
- Nishida wins via 12-round unanimous decision (115–112 twice and 117–110)

Confirmed bouts:

Weight Class		vs.		Method	Round	Time	Notes
Bantamweight	(Japan) Ryosuke Nishida	def.	(Puerto Rico) Emmanuel Rodríguez (c)	UD	12	3:00	For IBF bantamweight title
Bantamweight	(Japan) Teru Nobita	draw	(China) GuiMing Li	SD	8	3:00
Light flyweight	(Japan) Hisayuki Kinjo	def.	(Japan) Daisuke Yokoyama	TKO	3/4	1:39
Super bantamweight	(Japan) Ryuta Kinjo	def.	(Japan) Hiromu Tadokoro	UD	4	3:00
Welterweight	(Japan) Shota Torii	def.	(Japan) Ippei Kataoka	TKO	1/4	1:45
Super flyweight	(Japan) Akihiro Kudo	def.	(Japan) Yukahiro Suzuki	TKO	3/4	2:44
Featherweight	(Japan) Yota Sato	def.	(Japan) Haruka Hokamura	TKO	3/4	2:03
Suepr bantamweight	(Japan) Yudai Masumoto	def.	(Japan) Ruin Odani	MD	4	3:00

=== Benkei FIGHT vol. 2 ===
Benkei FIGHT vol. 2
- Date: June 30, 2024
- Venue: Abeno Ward Center, Osaka, Japan

Tale of the tape
Boxer	Ruku Sasaki	Yuki Hamashima
Pre-fight record	6–1–2 (3 KO)	11–6–1 ( KO)

Result
- Sasaki wins via 8-round unanimous decision (77–74, 78–73 and 79–72)

Confirmed bouts:

Weight Class		vs.		Method	Round	Time	Notes
Super welterweight	(Japan) Ruku Sasaki	def.	(Japan) Yuki Hamashima	UD	8	3:00
Super featherweight	(Japan) Ran Ijuin	def.	(Japan) Hiromu Murota	UD	8	3:00
Super featherweight	(Japan) Masamichi Funahashi	def.	(Japan) Seika Fukuda	UD	8	3:00
Super featherweight	(South Korea) Young Doo Choi	def.	(Japan)	TKO	2/6	1:35
Light welterweight	(Japan) Tomoya Hiwada	def.	(Japan) Genki Yamashita	MD	6	3:00
Super bantamweight	(Japan) Yoshiki Fujisaki	def.	(Japan) Toshiya Nunomoto	UD	4	3:00

=== 3150FIGHT vol. 9 ===
3150FIGHT vol. 9
- Date: July 28, 2024
- Venue: Shiga Daihatsu Arena, Ōtsu, Japan
- Title(s) on the line: IBF mini flyweight title

Tale of the tape
Boxer	Pedro Taduran	Ginjiro Shigeoka
Pre-fight record	16–4–1 (12 KO)	11–0, 1NC (9 KO)

Result
- Taduran wins via 9th-round TKO

Confirmed bouts:

Weight Class		vs.		Method	Round	Time	Notes
Mini flyweight	(Philippines) Pedro Taduran	def.	(Japan) Ginjiro Shigeoka (c)	TKO	9/12	2:50	For IBF mini flyweight title
Featherweight	(Japan) Matcha Nakagawa	def.	(Philippines) Pete Apolinar	UD	8	3:00
Super featherweight	(Japan) Kyonosuke Kameda	def.	(Japan) Mugicha Nakagawa	UD	8	3:00
Super flyweight	(Japan) Hayate Hanada	def.	(Japan) Toma Kondo	UD	8	3:00
Super flyweight	(Japan) Keisuke Iwasaki	def.	(Japan) Daichi Morino	SD	8	3:00
Bantamweight	(Japan) Ryusei Moriwaki	def.	(Cambodia) Lim Seavlam	TKO	3/6	2:22
Super featherweight	(Japan) Majisuka Kosaka	def.	(Japan) Toga Fukuhama	UD	6	3:00

=== LushBomu feat. 3150FIGHT ===
LushBomu feat. 3150FIGHT
- Date: August 24, 2024
- Venue: Yamato Arena, Suita, Japan

Tale of the tape
Boxer	Tomoki Kameda	Lerato Dlamini
Pre-fight record	41–4 (23 KO)	20–2 (11 KO)

Result
- Kameda wins via 12-round split decision (113–114, 114–113 and 116–111)

Confirmed bouts:

Weight Class		vs.		Method	Round	Time	Notes
Featherweight	(Japan) Tomoki Kameda	def.	(South Africa) Lerato Dlamini	SD	12	3:00
Light flyweight	(Japan) Yudai Shigeoka	def.	(Philippines) Samuel Salva	UD	10	3:00
Bantamweight	(Mexico) Kenbun Torres	def.	(Philippines) Kevin Jake Cataraja	SD	10	3:00
Super flyweight	(Japan) Sho Nogami	def.	(Philippines) Danrick Sumabong	UD	8	3:00
Lightweight	(Japan) Ran Ijuin	def.	(China) Peng Huang	UD	8	3:00
Light welterweight	(Japan) Ryusei Miyagawa	def.	(China) Shuai Wu	UD	6	3:00
Middleweight	(Japan) Ruku Sasaki	def.	(Japan) Mitsuyoshi Oshima	UD	6	3:00
Super featherweight	(Japan) Yota Sato	draw	(Japan) Tatsuki Abe	TD	2/4	2:22	4-round TD draw rule

=== 3150XLushBomu vol. 2 ===
3150XLushBomu vol. 2
- Date: October 12, 2024
- Venue: Aichi Sky Expo, Tokoname, Japan
- Title(s) on the line: IBF light flyweight title

Tale of the tape
Boxer	Masamichi Yabuki	Sivenathi Nontshinga
Pre-fight record	16–4 (15 KO)	13–1 (10 KO)

Result
- Yabuki wins via 9th-Round TKO

Confirmed bouts:

Weight Class		vs.		Method	Round	Time	Notes
Light flyweight	(Japan) Masamichi Yabuki	def.	(South Africa) Sivenathi Nontshinga (c)	TKO	9/12	1:50	For IBF light flyweight title
Super flyweight	(Japan) Ryo Mandokoro	def.	(Philippines) Alvin Camique	UD	8	3:00
Lightweight	(Japan) Ei Go	def.	(Philippines) Roldan Aldea	UD	8	3:00
Super flyweight	(Japan) Hayate Hanada	draw	(Philippines) Denmark Quibido	TD	2 (8)	0:38	4-round TD draw rule
Super welterweight	(Japan) Kenta Kamimura	def.	(Japan) Perapol Puangkeaw	UD	6	3:00
Lightweight	(Japan) Shoichiro Tsukita	def.	(Japan) Kenta Nakazato	UD	4	3:00
Featherweight	(Japan) Shunta Miyazato	def.	(Japan) Shota Fujimoto	TKO	1/4	1:31

=== Benkei FIGHT vol. 3 ===
Benkei FIGHT vol. 3
- Date: November 10, 2024
- Venue: Edion Arena, Osaka, Japan

Tale of the tape
Boxer	Ruku Sasaki	Fumisuke Kimura
Pre-fight record	8–1–2 (3 KO)	9–12–1 (6 KO)

Result
- Sasaki wins via 1st-round TKO

Confirmed bouts:

Weight Class		vs.		Method	Round	Time	Notes
Super welterweight	(Japan) Ruku Sasaki	def.	(Japan) Fumisuke Kimura	TKO	1/8	2:09
Flyweight	(Japan) Ryoma Morimoto	def.	(Japan) Keisuke Iwasaki	UD	8	3:00
Flyweight	(Japan) Shuri Oka	def.	(Japan) Yoshiki Minato	UD	8	3:00
Super featherweight	(Japan) Masamichi Funahashi	def.	(Japan) Kazuki Iwasaki	UD	8	3:00
Lightweight	(Japan) Ran Ijuin	draw	(Japan) Seiryu Yamana	SD	6	3:00
Light welterweight	(Japan) Hiroki Fukushige	def.	(Japan) Keigo Iwasaki	SD	6	3:00
Featherweight	(Japan) Ramen Takahashi	def.	(Japan) Naoki Uebayashi	TKO	2/4	0:20

=== 3150XLushBomu vol. 3 ===
3150XLushBomu vol. 3
- Date: December 21, 2024
- Venue: Twin Messe, Shizuoka, Japan
- Title(s) on the line: vacant IBF super flyweight title

Tale of the tape
Boxer	Willibaldo García	Rene Calixto
Pre-fight record	22–6–1 (13 KO)	23–0 (9 KO)

Result
- Split Draw (118–110, 114–114, 112–116)

Confirmed bouts:

Weight Class		vs.		Method	Round	Time	Notes
Super flyweight	(Mexico) Willibaldo García	draw	(Mexico) Rene Calixto	SD	12	3:00	For vacant IBF super flyweight title
Super flyweight	(Japan) Aoi Yokoyama	def.	(Philippines) Denmark Quibido	UD	8	3:00
Featherweight	(Japan) Kyonosuke Kameda	def.	(Philippines) Angelo Beltran	KO	1/8	1:18
Featherweight	(Japan) Matcha Nakagawa	def.	(Japan) Rocky Ogden	SD	8	3:00
Bantamweight	(Mexico) Salvador Juarez	def.	(Japan) Ryusei Moriwaki	SD	8	3:00
Heavyweight	(Japan) Mitsuro Tajima	def.	(Venezuela) Rosmen Brito	TKO	1/8	2:21
Light welterweight	(Japan) Ryusei Miyagawa	def.	(Thailand) Thitikorn Ratanakun	UD	6	3:00
Lightweight	(Japan) Seiya Akiyama	def.	(Japan) Shoichiro Tsukita	TKO	1/4	2:22

== 2025 ==
=== Benkei FIGHT vol. 4 ===
Benkei FIGHT vol. 4
- Date: February 24, 2025
- Venue: Abeno Ward Center, Osaka, Japan

Tale of the tape
Boxer	Ryo Mandokoro	Saw Lin Aung
Pre-fight record	4–0 (2 KO)	1–0 (0 KO)

Result
- Mandokoro wins via 1st-round KO

Confirmed bouts:

Weight Class		vs.		Method	Round	Time	Notes
Bantamweight	(Japan) Ryo Mandokoro	def.	(Myanmar) Saw Lin Aung	KO	1/8	2:55
Super flyweight	(Japan) Ryoma Morimoto	def.	(Myanmar) Naw Hpung	TKO	2/8	2:30
Super featherweight	(Japan) Ran Injuin	def.	(Japan) Shoki Yamauchi	MD	8	3:00
Lightweight	(South Korea) Young Doo Choi	def.	(Myanmar) Gin Sian Maung	TKO	3/8	1:52
Light welterweight	(Japan) Hiroki Fukushige	def.	(Japan) Takahiro Hamazaki	UD	6	3:00
Super bantamweight	(Japan) Masashi Tokihiro	def.	(Japan) Kisei Takada	UD	6	3:00

=== 3150XLushBomu vol. 4 ===
3150XLushBomu vol. 4
- Date: March 29, 2025
- Venue: Aichi Sky Expo, Tokoname, Japan
- Title(s) on the line: IBF flyweight title

Tale of the tape
Boxer	Masamichi Yabuki	Ángel Ayala
Pre-fight record	17–4 (16 KO)	18–0 (8 KO)

Result
- Yabuki wins via 12th-round TKO

Confirmed bouts:

Weight Class		vs.		Method	Round	Time	Notes
Flyweight	(Japan) Masamichi Yabuki	def.	(Mexico) Ángel Ayala (c)	TKO	12/12	1:54	For IBF flyweight title
Super flyweight	(Japan) Aoi Yokoyama	def.	(Philippines) Giemel Magramo (c)	UD	12	3:00	For OPBF super flyweight title
Featherweight	(Japan) Kyosuke Okamoto	def.	(Philippines) Michael Dasmariñas	TKO	5/8	1:18
Super featherweight	(Japan) Ei Go	def.	(Philippines) Jeo Santisima	UD	8	3:00
Super flyweight	(Japan) Hayate Hanada	def.	(Philippines) Yeroge Gura	UD	8	3:00
Bantamweight	(Japan) Ayumu Sano	def.	(Thailand) Nattapong Jankaew	TKO	4/8	1:29
Flyweight	(Japan) Rikito Irita	def.	(Thailand) Nanthanon Thongchai	UD	6	3:00

=== 3150XLushBomu vol. 5 ===
3150XLushBomu vol. 5
- Date: March 30, 2025
- Venue: Aichi Sky Expo, Tokonams, Japan
- Title(s) on the line: WBC mini flyweight title

Tale of the tape
Boxer	Melvin Jerusalem	Yudai Shigeoka
Pre-fight record	23–3 (12 KO)	9–1 (5 KO)

Result
- Jerusalem wins via 12-round unanimous decision (116–112, 118–110 and 119–109)

Confirmed bouts:

Weight Class		vs.		Method	Round	Time	Notes
Mini flyweight	(Philippines) Melvin Jerusalem (c)	def.	(Japan) Yudai Shigeoka	UD	12	3:00	For WBC mini flyweight title
Bantamweight	(Japan) Towa Tsuji	draw	(Japan) Shori Umezu	MD	8	3:00
Super bantamweight	(Japan) Mugicha Nakagawa	def.	(Thailand) Nawaphon Kaikanha	TKO	5/8	1:53
Super welterweight	(Japan) Kensuke Suzuki	def.	(Japan) Ruku Sasaki	SD	8	3:00
Welterweight	(Japan) Ryusei Miyagawa	def.	(Thailand) Nattawut Maneewong	TKO	2/8	2:37
Heavyweight	(Japan) Mitsuro Tajima	def.	(Mexico) Guillermo Casas	KO	4/6	0:40
Lightweight	(South Africa) John Paul Masamba	def.	(China) Yesibolati Nasiyiwula	UD	6	3:00

=== 3150XLushBomu vol. 6 ===
3150XLushBomu vol. 6
- Date: May 24, 2025
- Venue: Intex Osaka, Osaka, Japan
- Title(s) on the line: IBF featherweight title

Tale of the tape
Boxer	Angelo Leo	Tomoki Kameda
Pre-fight record	25–1 (12 KO)	42–4 (23 KO)

Result
- Leo wins via 12-round majority decision (114–114, 115–113 and 116–112)

Confirmed bouts:

Weight Class		vs.		Method	Round	Time	Notes
Featherweight	(United States) Angelo Leo (c)	def.	(Japan) Tomoki Kameda	MD	12	3:00	For IBF featherweight title
Mini flyweight	(Philippines) Pedro Taduran (c)	def.	(Japan) Ginjiro Shigeoka	SD	12	3:00	For IBF mini flyweight title
Featherweight	(Japan) Matcha Nakagawa	def.	(Japan) Hiroki Hanabusa	SD	8	3:00
Super flyweight	(Japan) Ryo Mandokoro	def.	(Philippines) Vencent Lacar	TKO	5/8	2:05
Flyweight	(Japan) Shuri Oka	def.	(Hong Kong) Raymond Poon Kaiching	TKO	3/8	2:24
Heavyweight	(Uganda) Herbert Matovu	def.	(Japan) Mitsuro Tajima	TKO	5/8	2:36
Lightweight	(Japan) Daigoro Marumoto	def.	(Thailand) Sukrit Nakpreecha	KO	2/6	2:12

=== Benkei FIGHT vol. 5 ===
Benkei FIGHT vol. 5
- Date: June 14, 2025
- Venue: Archaic Hall, Amagasaki, Japan

Tale of the tape
Boxer	Ryoma Morimoto	Keisuke Iwasaki
Pre-fight record	9–1 (7 KO)	9–6–3 (3 KO)

Result
- Morimoto wins via 10-round split decision (94–96, 96–94 and 97–93)

Confirmed bouts:

Weight Class		vs.		Method	Round	Time	Notes
Flyweight	(Japan) Ryoma Morimoto	def.	(Japan) Keisuke Iwasaki	SD	10	3:00
Light welterweight	(Japan) Hiroki Fukushige	def.	(Japan) Kazuki Higuchi	UD	8	3:00
Super featherweight	(Japan) Masamichi Funahashi	def.	(Japan) Seira Kishida	MD	8	3:00
Lightweight	(Japan) Ryunosuke Morita	def.	(Japan) Hojin Nakamura	TKO	2/4	0:34

=== Benkei FIGHT vol. 6 ===
Benkei FIGHT vol. 6
- Date: July 6, 2025
- Venue: 176BOX, Toyonaka, Japan

Tale of the tape
Boxer	John Paul Masamba	Takuya Hashimoto
Pre-fight record	1–0 (0 KO)	7–7–1 (7 KO)

Result
- Masamba wins via 1st-round TKO

Confirmed bouts:

Weight Class		vs.		Method	Round	Time	Notes
Light welterweight	(South Africa) John Paul Masamba	def.	(Japan) Takuya Hashimoto	TKO	1/8	1:06
Super featherweight	(Japan) Ramen Takahashi	def.	(Japan) Ryuki Tokunaga	TKO	4/4	0:53
Lightweight	(Japan) Ran Ijuin	def.	(Japan) Takahiro Hamazaki	TKO	5/6	0:41
Light flyweight	(Japan) Itsuki Eura	def.	(Japan) Raiki Shimada	KO	4/4	2:44
Lightweight	(Japan) Keito Kizunishi	def.	(Japan) Kyosuke Nakayama	UD	4	3:00

=== 3150XLushBomu vol. 7 (SaikouXLush vol. 1) ===
3150XLushBomu vol. 7 SaikouXLush vol. 1
- Date: July 20, 2025
- Venue: Bishkek Arena, Bishkek, Kyrgyzstan
- Title(s) on the line: WBA interim super flyweight title

Tale of the tape
Boxer	David Jiménez	Kenbun Torres
Pre-fight record	17–1 (11 KO)	15–5 (10 KO)

Result
- Jiménez wins via 11th-round KO

Confirmed bouts:

Weight Class		vs.		Method	Round	Time	Notes
Super flyweight	(Costa Rica) David Jiménez (c)	def.	(Mexico) Kenbun Torres	KO	11/12	1:12	For WBA interim super flyweight title; WBA super flyweight title eliminator
Super flyweight	(Uzbekistan) Hasanboy Dusmatov	def.	(Philippines) Mark Antonio	UD	8	3:00
Super flyweight	(Kazakhstan) Saken Bibossinov	def.	(Philippines) Christian Legane	KO	1/6	3:00
Flyweight	(Kyrgyzstan) Anvar Khodziev	def.	(Japan) Rikito Irita	UD	6	3:00
Middleweight	(Kyrgyzstan) Syrgak Abdyzhapar uulu	def.	(Japan) Ruku Sasaki	UD	6	3:00
Middleweight	(Kyrgyzstan) Ikhtiyor Nishonov	def.	(Uganda) Haluna Sematire	KO	4/6	1:18
Bantamweight	(Kyrgyzstan) Nurzhigit Dyushebaev	draw	(Kazakhstan) Yernur Kairat	MD	6	3:00
Bantamweight	(Japan) Hayate Hanada	def.	(Kyrgyzstan) Dzhenishbek Ulpatov	KO	2/6	1:20
Lightweight	(Kyrgyzstan) Munarbek Seitbek Uulu	def.	(Uganda) Connrad Sseruyange	UD	6	3:00

=== SaikouXLush vol. 2 ===
SaikouXLush vol. 2
- Date: October 25, 2025
- Venue: Bishkek Arena, Bishkek, Kyrgyzstan

Tale of the tape
Boxer	Kyonosuke Kameda	John Riel Casimero
Pre-fight record	15–5–2 (9 KO)	34–4–1 (23 KO)

Result
- Kameda wins via 10-round unanimous decision (97–93, 98–92 and 99–92)

Confirmed bouts:

Weight Class		vs.		Method	Round	Time	Notes
Catchweight (58kg)	(Japan) Kyonosuke Kameda	def.	(Philippines) John Riel Casimero	UD	10	3:00
Super flyweight	(Japan) Ayumu Sano	def.	(Philippines) Reymart Tagacanao (c)	UD	12	3:00	For WBA Asia super flyweight title
Super flyweight	(Japan) Hayate Hanada	def.	(Philippines) Kenneth Rapista	UD	10	3:00	For vacant IBF Youth super flyweight title
Light welterweight	(Kyrgyzstan) Askat Kultaev	def.	(Japan) Ryusei Miyagawa	UD	6	3:00
Light welterweight	(Kyrgyzstan) Nursultan Tulokulov	def.	(Kazakhstan) Abzal Serik	TKO	3/6	0:18

=== SaikouXLush vol. 3 ===
SaikouXLush vol. 3
- Date: October 26, 2025
- Venue: Bishkek Arena, Bishkek, Kyrgyzstan

Tale of the tape
Boxer	Luis Nery	Sathaporn Saart
Pre-fight record	36–2 (28 KO)	17–2 (9 KO)

Result
- Nery wins via 8th-round unanimous TD (78–73 and 80–71 twice)

Confirmed bouts:

Weight Class		vs.		Method	Round	Time	Notes
Featherweight	(Mexico) Luis Nery	def.	(Thailand) Sathaporn Saart	TD-U	8/10	1:28	Fight stopped due to accidental headbutt
Bantamweight	(Philippines) Kenneth Llover	def.	(Argentina) Luciano Baldor	KO	4/10	1:42
Lightweight	(Kyrgyzstan) Ryspek Bektenov	def.	(Philippines) Ken Danila	UD	6	3:00
Super welterweight	(Kyrgyzstan) Syrgak Abdyzhapar uulu	def.	(Uganda) Abaasi Sseguya	TKO	4/6	2:39
Flyweight	(Kyrgyzstan) Dzhenishbek Ulpatov	def.	(Japan) Rikito Irita	MD	6	3:00
Super welterweight	(Uzbekistan) Ikboljon Kholdarov	def.	(Kyrgyzstan) Argen Kadyrbek uulu	TKO	5/6	2:18
Super flyweight	(Japan) Ryoma Morimoto	def.	(Kyrgyzstan) Nurzhigit Dyushebaev	UD	6	3:00
Super flyweight	(Kazakhstan) Saken Bibossinov	def.	(Kyrgyzstan) Adilet Kachkynbekov	UD	6	3:00

=== Benkei FIGHT vol. 7 ===
Benkei FIGHT vol. 7
- Date: November 9, 2025
- Venue: Edion Arena, Osaka, Japan

Tale of the tape
Boxer	Ryan Joshua Yamamoto	Hiroki Fukushige
Pre-fight record	8–7 (2 KO)	7–2–1 (3 KO)

Result
- Yamamoto wins via unanimous decision (77–75 and 78–74 twice)

Confirmed bouts:

Weight Class		vs.		Method	Round	Time	Notes
Light welterweight	(Japan) Ryan Joshua Yamamoto	def.	(Japan) Hiroki Fukushige	UD	8	3:00
Super featherweight	(Japan) Ren Yamabe	def.	(Japan) Masamichi Funahashi	TKO	8/8	2:38
Super featherweight	(Japan) Matcha Nakagawa	def.	(Thailand) Chatyapak Srisuwa	UD	8	3:00
Super welterweight	(Japan) Ruku Sasaki	def.	(Thailand) Channarong Injampa	KO	3/8	2:55
Super featherweight	(Japan) Jinki Maeda	def.	(Thailand) Attanon Kunlawong	KO	3/8	2:55

=== SaikouXLush vol. 4 ===
SaikouXLush vol. 4
- Date: December 27, 2025
- Venue: Aichi Sky Expo, Tokoname, Japan
- Title(s) on the line: IBF flyweight title

Tale of the tape
Boxer	Masamichi Yabuki	Felix Alvarado
Pre-fight record	18–4 (17 KO)	42–4 (35 KO)

Result
- Yabuki wins via 12th-round KO

Confirmed bouts:

Weight Class		vs.		Method	Round	Time	Notes
Flyweight	(Japan) Masamichi Yabuki (c)	def.	(Nicaragua) Felix Alvarado	KO	12/12	1:59	For IBF flyweight title
Bantamweight	(Philippines) Kenneth Llover (c)	def.	(China) Ayati Sailike	KO	2/10	2:07	For OPBF bantamweight title
Featherweight	(Philippines) John Riel Casimero	def.	(Japan) Tom Mizokoshi	TKO	5/8	1:10
Super flyweight	(Kyrgyzstan) Adilet Kachkynbekov	def.	(Japan) Yoshiki Minato	UD	6	3:00
Middleweight	(Kyrgyzstan) Vadim Baurin	def.	(Japan) Katsuhiro Nakata	TKO	6/6	1:53
Super flyweight	(Japan) Ryo Mandokoro	def.	(Kyrgyzstan) Nurzhigit Dyushebaev	UD	6	3:00
Flyweight	(Japan) Daiki Kameyama	def.	(Kyrgyzstan) Bekzat Ergeshov	MD	6	3:00
Super bantamweight	(Kyrgyzstan) Islam Torobaev	def.	(Japan) Seiya Meguro	UD	6	3:00
Light welterweight	(Kyrgyzstan) Askat Kultaev	def.	(Japan) Ryan Joshua Yamamoto	UD	6	3:00
Super bantamweight	(Japan) Towa Tsuji	def.	(Kyrgyzstan) Anarbay Murzabaev	UD	6	3:00

== 2026 ==
=== Benkei FIGHT vol. 8 ===
Benkei FIGHT vol. 8
- Date: March 1, 2026
- Venue: 176BOX, Toyonaka, Japan

Tale of the tape
Boxer	Ryoma Morimoto	Hiroki Kinjo
Pre-fight record	11–1 (7 KO)	8–2–1 (6 KO)

Result
- Morimoto wins via 6th-round TKO

Confirmed bouts:

Weight Class		vs.		Method	Round	Time	Notes
Flyweight	(Japan) Ryoma Morimoto	def.	(Japan) Hiroki Kinjo	TKO	6/8	1:52
Super featherweight	(Japan) Ramen Takahashi	def.	(Japan) Naoto Komatsu	UD	8	3:00
Super featherweight	(South Korea) Young Doo Choi	def.	(Philippines) Richard Pumicpic	UD	8	3:00
Light welterweight	(Japan) Ryota Nakano	draw	(Japan) Tomoya Hiwada	UD	6	3:00

=== SaikouXLush vol. 5 (postponed) ===
SaikouXLush vol. 5
- Date: April 17, 2026
- Venue: Gazprom Sports Complex, Bishkek, Kyrgyzstan
- Title(s) on the line: vacant WBA Gold featherweight title

Tale of the tape
Boxer	Kyonosuke Kameda	Adrian Robledo
Pre-fight record	16–5–2 (9 KO)	12–1 (6 KO)

Result
- Event postponed

SaikouXLush vol. 5, 6 and 7 events were supposed to take place on April 17, 18 and 19, 2026, respectively in Bishkek, Kyrgyzstan. However on early April 2026, it was announced that the three events were postponed to a later time. A press release on 3150FIGHT's website stated, "We have decided to postpone the event(s) after taking into comprehensive consideration the rapid changed in the current international situation and the various impacts that come with them." The main cause was allegedly due to the 2026 Iran war.

Confirmed bouts:

Weight Class		vs.		Method	Round	Time	Notes
Featherweight	(Japan) Kyonosuke Kameda	vs.	(Argentina) Adrian Robledo		– (12)		For vacant WBA Gold featherweight title
Featherweight	(Argentina) Mirco Cuello (c)	vs.	(Japan) Tomoki Kameda		– (12)		For WBA interim featherweight title
Super flyweight	(Indonesia) Surya Dharma (c)	vs.	(Kazakhstan) Saken Bibossinov		– (10)		For WBA Asia South super flyweight title
Super featherweight	(Kyrgyzstan) Ryspek Bektenov	vs.	(Uganda) Isaac Masembe		– (6)
Flyweight	(Kyrgyzstan) Nurzhigit Dyushebaev	vs.	(Japan) Seiya Meguro		– (6)
Super welterweight	(Kyrgyzstan) Syrgak Abdyzhapar uupu	vs.	(India) Akashdeep Singh		– (6)
Bantamweight	(Kyrgyzstan) Islam Torobaev	vs.	(Russia) Fikrat Mukhametzyanov		– (6)
Light flyweight	(Japan) Towa Tsuji	vs.	(Kyrgyzstan) Dzhenishbek Ulpatov		– (6)

=== SaikouXLush vol. 6 (postponed) ===
SaikouXLush vol. 6
- Date: April 18, 2026
- Venue: Gazprom Sports Complex, Bishkek, Kyrgyzstan
- Title(s) on the line: vacant WBA Gold super bantamweight title

Tale of the tape
Boxer	Luis Nery	John Riel Casimero
Pre-fight record	37–2 (28 KO)	35–5–1 (24 KO)

Result
- Event postponed

SaikouXLush vol. 5, 6 and 7 events were supposed to take place on April 17, 18 and 19, 2026, respectively in Bishkek, Kyrgyzstan. However on early April 2026, it was announced that the three events were postponed to a later time. A press release on 3150FIGHT's website stated, "We have decided to postpone the event(s) after taking into comprehensive consideration the rapid changed in the current international situation and the various impacts that come with them." The main cause was allegedly due to the 2026 Iran war.

Confirmed bouts:

Weight Class		vs.		Method	Round	Time	Notes
Super bantamweight	(Mexico) Luis Nery	vs.	(Philippines) John Riel Casimero		– (12)		For vacant WBA Gold super bantamweight title
Cruiserweight	(Russia) Dilmurod Satybaldiev	vs.	(Zimbabwe) Charles Manyuchi		– (10)
Super welterweight	(Uzbekistan) Ikboljon Kholdarov	vs.	(Philippines) Dan Dacles		– (8)
Super flyweight	(Philippines) Claire Villarosa	vs.	(Japan) Hayate Hanada		– (8)
Super bantamweight	(Kyrgyzstan) Sanzhai Seidekmatov	vs.	(Japan) Tom Mizokoshi		– (6)
Light flyweight	(Kyrgyzstan) Bekzat Ergeshov	vs.	(Thailand) Kung Srirupramat		– (6)
Middleweight	(Kyrgyzstan) Almaz Orozbekov	vs.	(Thailand) Jara Chukliang		– (6)

=== SaikouXLush vol. 7 (postponed) ===
SaikouXLush vol. 7
- Date: April 19, 2026
- Venue: Gazprom Sports Complex, Bishkek, Kyrgyzstan
- Title(s) on the line: WBA interim super flyweight title

Tale of the tape
Boxer	David Jiménez	Ayumu Sano
Pre-fight record	18–1 (12 KO)	11–0–1 (5 KO)

Result
- Event postponed

SaikouXLush vol. 5, 6 and 7 events were supposed to take place on April 17, 18 and 19, 2026, respectively in Bishkek, Kyrgyzstan. However on early April 2026, it was announced that the three events were postponed to a later time. A press release on 3150FIGHT's website stated, "We have decided to postpone the event(s) after taking into comprehensive consideration the rapid changed in the current international situation and the various impacts that come with them." The main cause was allegedly due to the 2026 Iran war.

Confirmed bouts:

Weight Class		vs.		Method	Round	Time	Notes
Super bantamweight	(Costa Rica) David Jiménez (c)	vs.	(Japan) Ayumu Sano		– (12)		For WBA interim super flyweight title
Flyweight	(Uzbekistan) Hasanboy Dusmatov	vs.	(Argentina) Joel Contreras		– (12)
Flyweight	(Philippines) Vince Paras	vs.	(Japan) Aoi Yokoyama		– (8)
Cruiserweight	(Kyrgyzstan) Nurbek Valizhonov	vs.	(Uzbekistan) Jamshid Karimov		– (8)
Super middleweight	(Kyrgyzstan) Omurbek Bekzhigit uulu	vs.	(Indonesia) Ari Agustian		– (8)
Middleweight	(Kyrgyzstan) Samat Abdyrakhmanov	vs.	(Uzbekistan) Muzaffar Rasulov		– (8)
Flyweight	(Kyrgyzstan) Adilet Kachkynbekov	vs.	(Japan) Shuri Oka		– (6)
Super flyweight	(Kyrgyzstan) Anarbai Murzabaev	vs.	(Kazakhstan) Arlan Bakbergenov		– (6)

=== Benkei FIGHT vol. 9 ===
Benkei FIGHT vol. 9
- Date: May 9, 2026
- Venue: Archaic Hall, Amagasaki, Japan

Tale of the tape
Boxer	Yuichiro Taka	Jinki Maeda
Pre-fight record	7–0 (1 KO)	16–2 (10 KO)

Result
- Taka wins via 8-round UD (77–75, 78–74 and 79–73)

Confirmed bouts:

Weight Class		vs.		Method	Round	Time	Notes
Featherweight	(Japan) Yuichiro Taka	def.	(Japan) Jinki Maeda	UD	8	3:00
Lightweight	(Japan) Masamichi Funahashi	def.	(Japan) Tamaki Miwa	UD	8	3:00
Light welterweight	(Japan) Yoshiki Takahashi	def.	(Japan) Hiroki Fukushige	UD	8	3:00
Lightweight	(Japan) Ryunosuke Moriya	def.	(Japan) Seiya Akiyama	KO	5/6	1:38

=== SaikouXLush vol. 5 and 6 (retry, postponed) ===
SaikouXLush vol. 5
- Date: May 23, 2026
- Venue: Gazprom Sports Complex, Bishkek, Kyrgyzstan
- Title(s) on the line: WBA interim super flyweight title

Tale of the tape
Boxer	David Jiménez	Ayumu Sano
Pre-fight record	18–1 (12 KO)	11–0–1 (5 KO)

Result
- Event postponed

SaikouXLush vol. 6
- Date: May 24, 2026
- Venue: Gazprom Sports Complex, Bishkek, Kyrgyzstan
- Title(s) on the line: vacant WBA interim featherweight title

Tale of the tape
Boxer	Kyonosuke Kameda	Luis Nunez
Pre-fight record	16–5–2 (9 KO)	23–0 (15 KO)

Result
- Event postponed

A resumption of SaikouXLush vol. 5 and 6 events were scheduled totake place on May 23 and 24, 2026, respectively in Bishkek, Kyrgyzstan. However it would be postponed for the second time. Although the cause remains unclear, the cause was alleged to be the same as last cancellation. founder Kōki Kameda stated "Given the current situation where the Kyrgyzstan tournament has been cancelled, we are currently in urgent discussions with LUSH to determine whether is its possible to safely and reliably hold future events as SAIKOULUSH." Hinting a possible dissolution of the merged brand SaikouXLush. The SaikouXLush vol. 7 event, which was not in the same resumption strand as of vol. 5 and 6, was fully cancelled and was instead, merged with the 3150FIGHT vol. 10 event (which was originally in doubts of happening) on June 6, 2027 in Aichi Prefecture, Japan.

Due to lack of reliable sources and Tapology merging vol. 5 and 6 into one event, the confirmed bouts will of the two events will be shown as it is in Tapology:

Weight Class		vs.		Method	Round	Time	Notes
Featherweight	(Japan) Kyonosuke Kameda	vs.	(Dominican Republic) Luiz Nunez		– (12)		For vacant WBA interim featherweight title
Super flyweight	(Costa Rica) David Jiménez (c)	vs.	(Japan) Ayumu Sano		– (12)		For WBA interim super flyweight title
Flyweight	(Uzbekistan) Hasanboy Dusmatov	vs.	(Argentina) Joel Contreras		– (12)		For vacant WBA interim flyweight title
Featherweight	(Uzbekistan) Mirazizbek Mirzakhalilov	vs.	(Argentina) Adrian Robledo		– (12)		For vacant WBA Gold featherweight title
Cruiserweight	(Kyrgyzstan) Nurbek Valizhonov	vs.	(Uzbekistan) Jamshid Karimov		– (8)
Middleweight	(Kyrgyzstan) Samat Abdyrakhmanov	vs.	(Uzbekistan) Muzaffar Rasulov		– (6)

=== 3150FIGHT vol. 10 ===
3150FIGHT vol. 10
- Date: June 6, 2026
- Venue: Aichi Sky Expo, Tokoname, Japan
- Title(s) on the line: IBF flyweight title

Tale of the tape
Boxer	Masamichi Yabuki	Rene Calixto
Pre-fight record	19–4 (18 KO)	24–1–1 (10 KO)

Result
- Yabuki wins via 12-round UD (116–110 and 118–108 twice)

Confirmed bouts:

Weight Class		vs.		Method	Round	Time	Notes
Flyweight	(Japan) Masamichi Yabuki (c)	def.	(Mexico) Rene Calixto	UD	12	3:00	For IBF flyweight title
Catchweight (56.25kg)	(Philippines) John Riel Casimero	def.	(Mexico) Luis Nery	TKO	4/10	0:42	Nery missed weight
Super flyweight	(Australia) Andrew Moloney	def.	(Mexico) Willibaldo García (c)	MD	12	3:00	For IBF super flyweight title
Bantamweight	(United States) Michael Angeletti	def.	(Philippines) Kenneth Llover	SD	12	3:00	IBF bantamweight title eliminator
Bantamweight	(Japan) Aoi Yokoyama	def.	(Philippines) Vince Paras	UD	8	3:00
Super flyweight	(Japan) Shuri Oka	def.	(Kyrgyzstan) Adilet Kachkynbekov	TKO	5/6	0:04
Super bantamweight	(Kyrgyzstan) Nurzhigit Dyushebaev	def.	(Japan) Seiya Meguro	TKO	4/6	2:27

=== Benkei FIGHT vol. 10 ===
Benkei FIGHT vol. 10
- Date: June 13, 2026
- Venue: 176BOX, Toyonaka Japan

Tale of the tape
Boxer	Seiryu Yamana	Jinki Maeda
Pre-fight record	6–6–1 (4 KO)	19–2–2 (6 KO)

Result
- Yamana wins via 8-round UD (77–75 and 78–74 twice)

Confirmed bouts:

Weight Class		vs.		Method	Round	Time	Notes
Super featherweight	(Japan) Seiryu Yamana	def.	(Japan) Matcha Nakagawa	UD	8	3:00
Bantamweight	(Japan) Ryo Mandokoro	def.	(Myanmar) Nyan Lin Aung	TKO	2/8	1:30
Super flyweight	(Japan) Toki Tsuji	def.	(Myanmar) Zan Zan Min Htet	TKO	2/6	2:32
Super bantamweight	(Japan) Hayate Hanada	def.	(Myanmar) Zaw Zaw Naing	KO	2/6	1:01
Super flyweight	(Japan) Kota Kibe	def.	(Japan) Takahiro Komatsu	KO	3/4	0:48
Super flyweight	(Japan) Soma Enomoto	def.	(Japan) Taiga Abe	UD	4	3:00
Super flyweight	(Japan) Ryu Isaac Espinosa	def.	(Japan) Riku Nakashima	UD	4	3:00

=== Benkei FIGHT vol. 11 ===
Benkei FIGHT vol. 11
- Date: July 12, 2026
- Venue: 176BOX, Toyonaka, Japan
- Title(s) on the line: Japanese Youth super welterweight title

Tale of the tape
Boxer	Ruku Sasaki	Ryuto Sumida
Pre-fight record	10–4–2 (5 KO)	9–0 (3 KO)

Result
- Sasaki wins via 8-round UD (76–75 thrice)

Confirmed bouts:

Weight Class		vs.		Method	Round	Time	Notes
Super welterweight	(Japan) Ruku Sasaki (c)	def.	(Japan) Ryuto Sumida	UD	8	3:00	For Japanese Youth super welterweight title
Super featherweight	(Japan) Daigoro Marumoto	def.	(Japan) Itsuki Ikegami	TKO	1/8	2:22	For vacant Japanese Youth super featherweight title
Lightweight	(Japan) Ryuichi Sakamoto	def.	(Japan) Ran Ijuin	TD-U	7/8	2:36
Lightweight	(Japan) Ramen Takahashi	def.	(Japan) Yoshiki Igarashi	TKO	6/6	2:08

=== 3150FIGHT vol. 11 ===
3150FIGHT vol. 11
- Date: September 23, 2026
- Venue: Sumiyoshi Ward Center, Osaka, Japan

Tale of the tape
Boxer	Kyonosuke Kameda	Sebastian Hernandez
Pre-fight record	16–5–2 (9 KO)	20–1 (18 KO)

Result
- TBD

Confirmed bouts:

Weight Class		vs.		Method	Round	Time	Notes
Featherweight	(Japan) Kyonosuke Kameda	vs.	(Mexico) Sebastian Hernandez		– (10)

== See also ==
- Kōki Kameda
- Boxing in Japan
- Sport in Kyrgyzstan
- Boxing in Asia
