= Ryo Miyazaki =

Japanese boxer (born 1988)

Personal information
- Nickname: Naniwa no Bancho
- Nationality: Japanese
- Born: 宮崎亮; August 20, 1988 (age 37) Ōta, Gunma, Japan
- Height: 5 ft 1 1/2 in (156 cm)
- Weight: Flyweight; Light flyweight; Minimumweight

Boxing career
- Reach: 62 1/2 in (159 cm)
- Stance: Orthodox

Boxing record
- Total fights: 34
- Wins: 26
- Win by KO: 16
- Losses: 4
- Draws: 4

Ryo Miyazaki (宮崎 亮, Miyazaki Ryō; born August 20, 1988) is a Japanese professional boxer in the Light Flyweight division and a former World Boxing Association Minimumweight champion.

== Professional career ==
=== Light flyweight ===
==== Japanese champion ====
Miyazaki made his professional debut against Daothong Teerasakgym on 24 December 2006. He won the fight by a second-round knockout. Miyazaki amassed a 9–0–2 record before being booked to face the #9 ranked WBC light flyweight contender Munetsugu Kayo for the Japanese light-flyweight title on 12 October 2009. He won the fight by technical decision in the tenth round, with scores of 99–94, 98–94 and 97–94. Miyazaki made his first title defense against the #1 ranked Japanese light flyweight contender Suguru Takizawa on 21 February 2010. The fight was ruled a draw by technical decision early in the fourth round. An accidental clash of heads left a cut on the left side of Takizawa's head, which left him unable to continue competing.

==== OPBF champion ====
Miyazaki challenged the #9 ranked WBC light flyweight contender Katsuhiko Iezumi for the OPBF light-flyweight title on 14 June 2010. He captured his second professional title by technical knockout, as he stopped Iezumi at the 2:41 minute mark of the eighth round. Miyazaki vacated the Japanese light flyweight title on 20 August 2010.

Miyazaki made his first OPBF light flyweight title defense against Junichi Ebisuoka on 21 October 2010. He won the fight by an eleventh-round technical knockout. The fight was stopped on the advice of the ringside physician, due to a cut on Ebisouka's right eye. Miyazaki made his second title defense against Donny Mabao on 12 June 2011. He won the fight by unanimous decision, with scores of 117–111, 118–110 and 119–110. Miyazaki made his third title defense with a fourth-round knockout of Jerson Mancio on 2 October 2011. Miyazaki made his fourth and final OPBF light flyweight title defense against Michael Landero on 20 June 2012, whom he beat by unanimous decision.

=== WBA minimumweight champion ===
==== Miyazaki vs. Porpramook ====
Miyazaki faced Pornsawan Porpramook for the vacant WBA minimumweight title on 31 December 2012, at the Osaka Prefectural Gymnasium in Osaka, Japan. The vacant championship bout took place on the undercard of the Kazuto Ioka and José Alfredo Rodríguez light flyweight title fight. Miyazaki captured the vacant belt by split decision. Judges Sergio Caiz and Wan Soo Yuh awarded him a 116–111 scorecard, while judge Levi Martinez scored the fight 114–113 for Porpramook.

==== Miyazaki vs. Velarde ====
Miyazaki made his first minimumweight title defense against Carlos Velarde on 8 May 2013, once against on the Kazuto Ioka undercard and once again at the Osaka Prefectural Gymnasium in Osaka, Japan. The owner of Miyazaki's gym furthermore announced he would award his fighter a ¥1,000,000 bonus, should he win by stoppage. Miyazaki retained the belt by a fifth-round technical knockout. Due to his struggles in making weight, he revealed he would move up to light flyweight in the near future.

==== Miyazaki vs. Silvestre ====
Miyazaki made his second WBA world title defense against the WBA interim minimumweight champion Jesús Silvestre on 11 September 2013. The fight was scheduled as the co-main event of the Kazuto Ioka and Kwanthai Sithmorseng WBA light flyweight championship bout and took place at the same venue as his previous two appearances. He retained the title by majority decision, with two judges scoring the fight 115–114 and 115–113 in his favor, while the third judge scored the fight an even 114–114. Miyazaki suffered cuts on his left eyelid and the corner of his right eye due to several accidental headbutts. He vacated the title on 2 October 2013, in order to move up to light flyweight.

=== Return to light flyweight ===
Miyazaki made his light flyweight debut against Teeraphong Utaida on 31 December 2013. He suffered his first professional loss, as Utaida knocked him out at the 2:22 minute mark of the third round. Miyazai bounced back with stoppage victories over Ichal Tobida on 16 September 2014 and Kajonsak Nattapolgym on 31 December 2014. He went on to notch two more stoppage victories the following year, as he knocked Nattawut Saisopa out on 22 April 2015 and Chaowalit Choedram on 31 December 2015.

His four-fight win streak earned Miyazaki the chance to challenge Ryoichi Taguchi for the WBA light-flyweight championship. The title bout took place at the Ota City General Gymnasium in Tokyo, Japan on 31 August 2016. He lost the fight by unanimous decision, with scores of 119–109, 116–112 and 117–111. Miyazaki failed to renew his boxing license afterwards and submitted a retirement notification to the Japanese boxing commission on 15 August 2017. In September 2017, Miyazaki was arrested for driving without a driver's license, which led to him being suspended by the Japanese boxing commission as well. Once his probation ended in May 2021, Miyazaki requested that his boxing license be renewed, which was approved soon after.

Miyazaki faced Takayuki Teraji in a 51.5 kg catchweight bout on 16 December 2021, following a five-year absence from the sport, in the co-main event of 3150 Fight Club. He won the fight by a third-round knockout. Miyazaki next faced Takumi Sakae in a flyweight bout on 29 April 2022. He won the fight by unanimous decision, with two scorecards of 77–75 and one scorecard of 78–74. His two-fight win streak was snapped by Azael Villar, who stopped him by technical knockout in the first round. Miyazaki returned on 27 November 2022 to face the journeyman Toma Kondo. The fight was ruled a split decision draw after eight rounds.

== Professional boxing record ==
34 fights	26 wins	4 losses
By knockout	16	3
By decision	10	1
Draws	4	

No.	Result	Record	Opponent	Type	Round, time	Date	Location	Notes
34	Loss	26–4–4	Yuto Nakamura	TKO	4 (8), 2:07	1 Apr 2023	EDION Arena Osaka, Osaka, Japan	
33	Draw	26–3–4	Toma Kondo	SD	8	27 Nov 2022	176BOX, Toyonaka, Japan	
32	Loss	26–3–3	Azael Villar	TKO	1 (8), 1:43	14 Aug 2022	EDION Arena Osaka, Osaka, Japan	
31	Win	26–2–3	Takumi Sakae	UD	8	29 Apr 2022	Mielparque Hall, Osaka, Japan	
30	Win	25–2–3	Takayuki Teraji	KO	3 (6), 2:11	16 Dec 2021	Mielparque Hall, Osaka, Japan	
29	Loss	24–2–3	Ryoichi Taguchi	UD	12	31 Aug 2016	Ota City General Gymnasium, Tokyo, Japan	For WBA light-flyweight title
28	Win	24–1–3	Chaowalit Choedram	KO	3 (8), 2:19	31 Dec 2015	EDION Arena Osaka, Osaka, Japan	
27	Win	23–1–3	Nattawut Saisopa	KO	4 (8), 1:22	22 Apr 2015	Osaka Prefectural Gymnasium, Osaka, Japan	
26	Win	22–1–3	Kajonsak Nattapolgym	TKO	3 (8), 2:00	31 Dec 2014	Osaka Prefectural Gymnasium, Osaka, Japan	
25	Win	21–1–3	Ichal Tobida	KO	5 (8), 1:09	16 Sep 2014	Korakuen Hall, Tokyo, Japan	
24	Loss	20–1–3	Teeraphong Utaida	KO	3 (10), 2:22	31 Dec 2013	Osaka Prefectural Gymnasium, Osaka, Japan	
23	Win	20–0–3	Jesús Silvestre	MD	12	11 Sep 2013	Osaka Prefectural Gymnasium, Osaka, Japan	Retained WBA minimumweight title
22	Win	19–0–3	Carlos Velarde	TKO	5 (12), 2:22	8 May 2013	Osaka Prefectural Gymnasium, Osaka, Japan	Retained WBA minimumweight title
21	Win	18–0–3	Pornsawan Porpramook	SD	12	31 Dec 2012	Osaka Prefectural Gymnasium, Osaka, Japan	Won vacant WBA minimumweight title
20	Win	17–0–3	Michael Landero	UD	12	20 Jun 2012	Osaka Prefectural Gymnasium, Osaka, Japan	Retained OPBF light-flyweight title
19	Win	16–0–3	Somprasong Chuenchana	TKO	3 (8), 1:35	31 Dec 2011	Osaka Prefectural Gymnasium, Osaka, Japan	
18	Win	15–0–3	Jerson Mancio	KO	4 (12), 0:26	2 Oct 2011	IMP Hall, Osaka, Japan	Retained OPBF light-flyweight title
17	Win	14–0–3	Donny Mabao	UD	12	12 Jun 2011	IMP Hall, Osaka, Japan	Retained OPBF light-flyweight title
16	Win	13–0–3	Manot Comput	KO	5 (10), 1:35	11 Feb 2011	World Memorial Hall, Hyogo, Japan	
15	Win	12–0–3	Junichi Ebisuoka	TKO	11 (12), 2:37	21 Oct 2010	Bunka Hall, Hyogo, Japan	Retained OPBF light-flyweight title
13	Win	11–0–3	Katsuhiko Iezumi	TKO	8 (12), 2:41	14 Jun 2010	Korakuen Hall, Tokyo, Japan	Won OPBF light-flyweight title
13	Draw	10–0–3	Suguru Takizawa	TD	4 (10), 0:55	21 Feb 2010	IMP Hall, Osaka, Japan	Retained Japanese light-flyweight title
12	Win	10–0–2	Munetsugu Kayo	TD	10 (10), 1:03	12 Oct 2009	Korakuen Hall, Tokyo, Japan	Won Japanese light-flyweight title
11	Win	9–0–2	Shinnosuke Saito	TKO	1 (8), 0:34	22 Jul 2009	Korakuen Hall, Tokyo, Japan	
10	Win	8–0–2	Hiroaki Kusunoki	TKO	1 (8), 2:57	12 Apr 2009	Osaka Prefectural Gymnasium, Osaka, Japan	
9	Win	7–0–2	Takuya Yamada	TD	9 (10), 0:51	24 Nov 2008	Osaka Prefectural Gymnasium, Osaka, Japan	
8	Win	6–0–2	Bunnam Thammakhun	UD	10	22 Jun 2008	Osaka Prefectural Gymnasium, Osaka, Japan	
7	Draw	5–0–2	Keisuke Akagi	TD	3 (10), 2:06	29 Feb 2008	Osaka Prefectural Gymnasium, Osaka, Japan	
6	Win	5–0–1	Aekatit Kanyaprom	KO	2 (8), 1:40	5 Jan 2008	Osaka Prefectural Gymnasium, Osaka, Japan	
5	Win	4–0–1	Taiji Hashimoto	UD	8	14 Oct 2007	Osaka Prefectural Gymnasium, Osaka, Japan	
4	Draw	3–0–1	Toshihiko Kido	TD	3 (6), 0:20	24 Jun 2007	Nishinari Ward Gym, Osaka, Japan	
3	Win	3–0	Yasuhiro Suda	UD	6	29 Apr 2007	IMP Hall, Osaka, Japan	
2	Win	2–0	Suanruang Sorthanapinyo	TKO	1 (4), 2:19	12 Feb 2007	Archaic Hall, Amagasaki, Japan	
1	Win	1–0	Daothong Teerasakgym	KO	2 (4), 1:50	24 Dec 2006	Azalea Taisho, Osaka, Japan	

== See also ==
- List of Mini-flyweight boxing champions
- List of Japanese boxing world champions
- Boxing in Japan

Achievements
Vacant Title last held by Kazuto Ioka	WBA minimumweight champion December 31, 2012 – December 26, 2013; Vacated	Vacant Title next held by Hekkie Budler
