= Luis Nery (boxer) =

Mexican Boxer (born 1994)

Personal information
- Nickname: Pantera
- Born: Luis Esteban Nery Hernández; 12 December 1994 (age 31) Tijuana, Baja California, Mexico
- Height: 5 ft 5 1/2 in (166 cm)
- Weight: Bantamweight; Super bantamweight; Featherweight; Super featherweight

Boxing career
- Reach: 67 1/2 in (171 cm)
- Stance: Southpaw

Boxing record
- Total fights: 41
- Wins: 38
- Win by KO: 29
- Losses: 3

Luis Esteban Nery Hernández (born December 12, 1994) is a Mexican professional boxer. He is a two weight world champion, having held the WBC and Ring magazine bantamweight titles between 2017 and 2018, and the WBC super bantamweight title from 2020 to 2021. Nicknamed "Pantera", Nery is known for his exceptional punching power, possessing a knockout ratio of 77.77%.

== Professional career ==
=== Early career ===
Nery was born and fights out of Tijuana. He only fought 9 amateur bouts, winning all of them, five of them by knockout. Nery made his professional debut in May 2012 at the age of 17.

Nery won his first 18 fights before challenging for the vacant WBC Continental bantamweight title against Martín Casillas. Casillas was knocked down twice during the fight as Nery took a unanimous decision (100–88, 99–89, 98–90). Nery's one defense of that regional title came against former interim super flyweight world champion David Sánchez. After an early head clash that threatened to stop the fight, Nery dominated Sánchez landing a series of power punches that broke Sánchez down. The former interim titlist was knocked down in the 5th round and retired on the stool. In December 2016, Nery was knocked down for the first time in his pro career in the first round of a bout against Raymond Tabugon. Despite the knockdown, the fight was mostly one-sided as Nery battered Tabugon until the referee stopped it in the fourth round.

=== Nery vs. Yamanaka ===
Although Nery spoke of challenging for a super flyweight title, his first shot at a world title would come against WBC and The Ring bantamweight champion Shinsuke Yamanaka on August 15, 2017, which he won with a sensational fourth-round stoppage. The bout started with both fighters trading back and forth combinations, but at the start of the fourth round Nery rocked Yamanaka with a left cross. After a brief respite in which Yamanaka seemed to regain control, Nery continued pummeling the defending champion, who was unable to defend himself. Yamanaka's corner eventually rushed into the ring to protect their fighter, giving Nery the win. The fight was seen by an audience of over 7 million in Japan.

On August 24, it was reported that Nery tested positive for zilpaterol, a banned substance. The sample that tested positive was taken on July 27, while three samples that were taken in August tested negative. Nery claimed he had failed the drug test due to food contamination. After Nery's B-sample confirmed the result, The Ring reinstated Yamanaka as their bantamweight champion.

With the WBC yet to make a public ruling, it was announced Nery would be facing Arthur Villanueva in a non-title bout in his hometown, Tijuana, at Estadio Gasmart on November. In front of a crowd of 16,000, Nery defeated Villanueva with a round 6 TKO, despite being knocked down in round 4. Villanueva claimed that the stoppage was "premature".

On October 31, the WBC made its final ruling on Nery's positive test. The sanctioning body concluded that the positive test was due to contaminated food. Consequently, the result of the Yamanaka-Nery title bout wouldn't be overturned but the WBC ordered a rematch, which was eventually scheduled for March.

=== Nery vs. Yamanaka II ===
Nery was once again successful in the rematch, claiming victory with a second-round TKO.

From the outset, Yamanaka attempted to box more conservatively from the outside and had some success in this regard. Nery, however, fired back with a series of savage combinations which visibly hurt Yamanaka, before knocking him down with an overhand left.

The following round was more of the same as Nery stalked and attacked continually, knocking Yamanaka down a total of three times before the fight was waved off.

Ultimately, as Nery weighed in three pounds over the bantamweight limit at 121lbs, the WBC bantamweight title was only at stake for Yamanaka and subsequently became vacant.

==== Nery vs Arroyo ====
On 16 March 2019, Nery battled former IBF super flyweight champion McJoe Arroyo. Nery dropped Arroyo once in the second and third round, and twice in the fourth round. After the end of the fourth round, Arroyo's corner informed the referee to stop the fight. Nery won the bout via 4th round retirement.

==== Nery vs. Payano ====
On July 20, 2019, Nery fought former WBA bantamweight champion Juan Carlos Payano. Nery had his own way for most of the fight, landing the cleaner shots throughout the fight. In the ninth round, a perfectly placed left hook to the body by Nery send Payano to the canvas. Writhing in pain, Payano was not even able to attempt to beat the count, leading to a ninth-round KO win for Nery.

==== Nery vs. Alameda ====
On September 26, 2020, Nery faced Aaron Alameda for the vacant WBC super bantamweight title. Alameda was ranked #6 by the WBC at the time. Nery won the fight via unanimous decision, winning on all three scorecards, 118–110, 116-112 and 115–113.

==== Nery vs. Figueroa ====
In his next fight, Nery fought WBA regular super bantamweight champion Brandon Figueroa in a unification bout. Nery was seen as a favorite to beat Figueroa, with opening odds seeing Nery as a -400 favorite and Figueroa at +275, although the line later saw Nery drop to -225 and Figueroa rise to +175. Nery started bright and was dominating the fight, but Figueroa managed to drop Nery in the seventh round. As Nery was getting up from the canvas, referee Thomas Taylor decided to wave the fight off, handing Nery the first defeat of his career.

==== Nery vs. Castro ====
In his next fight, Nery fought Carlos Castro, ranked #2 by the WBO, #3 by the WBC and IBF and #13 by the WBA at super bantamweight. Nery dropped Castro in the first round and boxed well in the rest of the fight to get a split-decision win over Castro, 96–93, 95-94 and 94–95 on the scorecards in his favor.

==== Nery vs. Carmona ====
On October 1, 2022, Nery moved up to super featherweight for the first time to take on former super flyweight title challenger David Carmona. He won the fight by third-round technical knockout.

==== Nery vs. Hovhannisyan ====
On February 18, 2023, Nery fought WBA super bantamweight mandatory challenger Azat Hovhannisyan in a WBC super bantamweight title eliminator. In a very entertaining and competitive fight, Nery managed to win by eleventh-round technical knockout. The fight was later voted The Ring Magazine's 2023 fight of the year.

==== Nery vs. Saludar ====
On July 8, 2023, Nery fought Froilan Saludar. He won the fight by second-round technical knockout.

==== Nery vs. Inoue ====
Nery was scheduled to challenge Naoya Inoue for the undisputed super bantamweight title on May 6, 2024, at Tokyo Dome in Tokyo, Japan. Nery scored a Knockdown in the first round, but was dropped 3 times over by Inoue and lost the fight via sixth round Knockout. At the time of stoppage Nery was behind on all 3 judges scorecards having lost every round except the first.

==== Nery vs. Kameda ====
On January 16, 2025, it was reported that Nery would be moving up to the featherweight division to face Kyonosuke Kameda in Mexico on February 22, 2025. Nery won the fight by KO in the 7th round.

==== Nery vs Saart ====
Nery's second fight at featherweight division came against Sathaporn Saart on October 26, 2025. Nery dropped Saart in the first round and dominated the entire fight, but an accidentally clashed of heads stopped the fight in the eighth round and Nery won the fight via technical decision.

==== Nery vs. Casimero ====
In March 2026, it was announced that Mery was scheduled to face former IBF light flyweight and flyweight, and WBO champion John Riel Casimero on April 18, 2026, in Bishkek, Kyrgyzstan. The bout was scheduled to headline the SaikouXLush vol. 6 event for the vacant WBA Gold super bantamweight championship. However, on April 2, the event would be cancelled alongside two others in the same venue due to rapid changes in the current international situation, allegedly caused by the 2026 Iran war. Eventually, Nery's bout against Casimero was rescheduled to June 6, 2026, at 3150FIGHT vol. 10, in Aichi Sky Expo, Tokoname, Japan. Their bout was now settled for a 10-rounder catchweight of 126 pounds. During the day of weigh-in, Casimero was able to make weight, weighing 123.4 pounds, however, in a surprising twist, Nery was overweight, scaling in at 127.2 pounds, 3.2 pounds over the agreed catchweight. Nery was given a punishment, where he is unable to weight beyond 134 pounds tomorrow morning and he was fined a certain amount, he may also face further punishment from the JBC. Casimero knocked Nery to that canvas six times throughout the fight and eventually won by stoppage in the fourth round.

== Professional boxing record ==
41 fights	38 wins	3 losses
By knockout	29	3
By decision	9	0

No.	Result	Record	Opponent	Type	Round, time	Date	Location	Notes
41	Win	38–3	Francisco Rodriguez Rubio	TKO	3 (10),	Nov 12, 2026	Guerrero, Acapulco, Mexico	
40	Loss	37–3	John Riel Casimero	TKO	4 (10), 0:42	Jun 6, 2026	Aichi Sky Expo, Tokoname, Japan	
39	Win	37–2	Sathaporn Saart	TD	8 (10), 1:28	Oct 26, 2025	Bishkek Arena, Bishkek, Kyrgyzstan	Unanimous TD: Fight stopped after accidental headbutt
38	Win	36–2	Kyonosuke Kameda	TKO	7 (10), 2:23	Feb 22, 2025	Auditorio Municipal, Tijuana, Mexico	
37	Loss	35–2	Naoya Inoue	KO	6 (12), 1:22	May 6, 2024	Tokyo Dome, Tokyo, Japan	For WBA (Super), WBC, IBF, WBO, and The Ring super bantamweight titles
36	Win	35–1	Froilan Saludar	TKO	2 (12), 0:41	Jul 8, 2023	Recinto Ferial Metepec, Metepec, Mexico	
35	Win	34–1	Azat Hovhannisyan	KO	11 (12), 1:51	Feb 18, 2023	Pomona Fox Theater, Pomona, California, U.S.	
34	Win	33–1	David Carmona	TKO	3 (10), 2:08	Oct 1, 2022	Auditorio Municipal Fausto Gutiérrez Moreno, Tijuana, Mexico	
33	Win	32–1	Carlos Castro	SD	10	Feb 5, 2022	Michelob Ultra Arena, Paradise, Nevada, U.S.	Won vacant WBC Silver and WBO Inter-Continental super bantamweight titles
32	Loss	31–1	Brandon Figueroa	KO	7 (12), 2:18	May 15, 2021	Dignity Health Sports Park, Carson, California, U.S.	Lost WBC super bantamweight title; For WBA (Regular) super bantamweight title
31	Win	31–0	Aarón Alameda	UD	12	Sep 26, 2020	Mohegan Sun Arena, Montville, Connecticut, U.S.	Won vacant WBC super bantamweight title
30	Win	30–0	Juan Carlos Payano	KO	9 (12), 1:43	Jul 20, 2019	MGM Grand Garden Arena, Paradise, Nevada, U.S.	Retained WBC Silver bantamweight title
29	Win	29−0	McJoe Arroyo	RTD	4 (10), 3:00	Mar 16, 2019	AT&T Stadium, Arlington, Texas, U.S.	
28	Win	28−0	Renson Robles	TKO	7 (10), 1:16	Dec 1, 2018	Arena Pavillón del Norte, Saltillo, Mexico	
27	Win	27−0	Jason Canoy	KO	3 (12), 2:44	Oct 6, 2018	Gasmart Stadium, Tijuana, Mexico	Won vacant WBC Silver bantamweight title
26	Win	26–0	Shinsuke Yamanaka	TKO	2 (12), 1:03	Mar 1, 2018	Ryōgoku Kokugikan, Tokyo, Japan	WBC bantamweight title at stake only for Yamanaka after Nery missed weight
25	Win	25–0	Arthur Villanueva	TKO	6 (10), 1:19	Nov 4, 2017	Estadio Gasmart, Tijuana, Mexico	
24	Win	24–0	Shinsuke Yamanaka	TKO	4 (12), 2:29	Aug 15, 2017	Shimadzu Arena, Kyoto, Japan	Won WBC and The Ring bantamweight titles
23	Win	23–0	Jesús Martínez	RTD	4 (12), 3:00	Mar 11, 2017	Mexico City Arena, Mexico City, Mexico	
22	Win	22–0	Raymond Tabugon	TKO	4 (12), 2:42	Dec 17, 2016	El Foro Chiapas, Tuxtla Gutiérrez, Mexico	Won vacant WBC Silver bantamweight title
21	Win	21–0	Richie Mepranum	TKO	2 (10), 0:41	Oct 22, 2016	Auditorio Municipal, Tijuana, Mexico	
20	Win	20–0	David Sánchez	RTD	4 (10), 3:00	Jul 30, 2016	Auditorio Municipal, Tijuana, Mexico	Retained WBC Continental Americas bantamweight title
19	Win	19–0	Martín Casillas	UD	10	Apr 16, 2016	Gimnasio Olímpico Juan de la Barrera, Mexico City, Mexico	Won vacant WBC Continental Americas bantamweight title
18	Win	18–0	Humberto Morales	TKO	5 (10), 0:17	Jan 30, 2016	Centro de Convenciones, Rosarito, Mexico	
17	Win	17–0	John Mark Apolinario	TKO	2 (10), 2:57	Sep 26, 2015	Centro de Convenciones, Puerto Peñasco, Mexico	
16	Win	16–0	Jether Oliva	RTD	4 (10), 3:00	Feb 28, 2015	Centro de Convenciones, Rosarito, Mexico	
15	Win	15–0	Carlos Fontes	TKO	8 (8), 2:17	Dec 6, 2014	Centro de Usos Múltiples, Hermosillo, Mexico	
14	Win	14–0	Víctor Méndez	SD	8	Aug 30, 2014	Centro de Usos Múltiples, Hermosillo, Mexico	
13	Win	13–0	José Estrella	RTD	5 (8), 0:10	Jun 27, 2014	Hipódromo Caliente, Tijuana, Mexico	
12	Win	12–0	Antonio Rodríguez	KO	3 (8), 2:28	Apr 11, 2014	Hipódromo Caliente, Tijuana, Mexico	
11	Win	11–0	Javier Cifuentes	KO	4 (6)	Feb 15, 2014	Feria Mesoamericana, Tapachula, Mexico	
10	Win	10–0	Adán Osuna	TKO	1 (8), 1:56	Dec 13, 2013	Hipódromo Caliente, Tijuana, Mexico	
9	Win	9–0	Oswaldo Castro	UD	8	Oct 26, 2013	Hipódromo Caliente, Tijuana, Mexico	
8	Win	8–0	Saúl Hernández	TKO	5 (6), 1:04	Aug 23, 2013	Forum Tecate, Tijuana, Mexico	
7	Win	7–0	Rafael Alvarado	TKO	2 (6), 1:31	Jun 14, 2013	Caliente Hipódromo, Tijuana, Mexico	
6	Win	6–0	Marino Canete	TKO	2 (4), 2:09	Apr 10, 2013	Salón Las Pulgas, Tijuana, Mexico	
5	Win	5–0	Leonardo Reyes	TKO	1 (4), 2:18	Feb 16, 2013	Auditorio Municipal, Tijuana, Mexico	
4	Win	4–0	Joan Sandoval	UD	4	Nov 28, 2012	Salón Las Pulgas, Tijuana, Mexico	
3	Win	3–0	Carlos Castañeda	UD	4	Sep 20, 2012	Salón Las Pulgas, Tijuana, Mexico	
2	Win	2–0	Javier Miranda	UD	4	Jun 7, 2012	Salón Las Pulgas, Tijuana, Mexico	
1	Win	1–0	José Guadalupe Salgado	TKO	1 (4), 1:04	May 5, 2012	Auditorio Municipal, Tijuana, Mexico	

== Titles in boxing ==
=== Major world titles ===
- WBC bantamweight champion (118 lbs)
- WBC super bantamweight champion (122 lbs)

=== The Ring magazine titles ===
- The Ring bantamweight champion (118 lbs)

=== Regional/International titles ===
- WBC Continental Americas bantamweight champion (118 lbs)
- WBC Silver bantamweight champion (118 lbs) (2x)
- WBC Silver super bantamweight champion (122 lbs)
- WBO Inter-Continental super bantamweight champion (122 lbs)

== See also ==
- List of southpaw stance boxers
- List of Mexican boxing world champions
- List of world bantamweight boxing champions
- List of world super-bantamweight boxing champions

Sporting positions
Regional boxing titles
Vacant Title last held by Hugo Ruiz	WBC Continental Americas bantamweight champion April 16, 2016 – October 2016; Vacated	Vacant Title next held by Mario Diaz Maldonado
Vacant Title last held by Anselmo Moreno	WBC Silver bantamweight champion December 17, 2016 – May 2017; Vacated	Vacant Title next held by Nordine Oubaali
Vacant Title last held by Nordine Oubaali	WBC Silver bantamweight champion October 6, 2018 – August 2020; Vacated	Vacant Title next held by Jason Moloney
Vacant Title last held by Franklin Manzanilla	WBC Silver super bantamweight champion February 5, 2022 – 2023; Vacated	Vacant Title next held by Juan Martinez Ayala
Vacant Title last held by Michael Conlan	WBO Inter-Continental super bantamweight champion February 5, 2022 – 2023; Vacated	Vacant
World boxing titles
Preceded by Shinsuke Yamanaka	WBC bantamweight champion August 15, 2017 – February 28, 2018; Stripped	Vacant Title next held by Nordine Oubaali
Preceded by Shinsuke Yamanaka	The Ring bantamweight champion August 15, 2017 – September 26, 2017; Stripped	Succeeded by Shinsuke Yamanaka; Reinstated
Vacant Title last held by Rey Vargas	WBC super bantamweight champion September 26, 2020 – May 15, 2021	Succeeded by Brandon Figueroa
Awards
Previous: Leigh Wood vs. Michael Conlan	The Ring Fight of the Year vs. Azat Hovhannisyan; 2023	Incumbent
