= Kyonosuke Kameda =

Japanese boxer (born 1998)

Personal information
- Native name: 亀田京之介
- Born: October 1, 1998 (age 27) Osaka, Japan
- Height: 1.76 m (5 ft 9 in)
- Weight: Featherweight

Boxing career
- Reach: 179 cm (70 in)
- Stance: Orthodox

Boxing record
- Total fights: 23
- Wins: 16
- Win by KO: 9
- Losses: 6
- Draws: 2

Kyonosuke Kameda (亀田京之介, Kameda Kyonosuke; born 1 October 1998) is a Japanese professional boxer.

== Professional career ==
=== Early career ===
Kameda made his professional debut on 1 January 2018 against 2–1 Shinnosuke Kimoto in Differ Ariake, Tokyo. Kameda would suffer a second-round stoppage. Kameda would bounce back on 5 May 2018 in Korakuen Hall against Kazuyuki Watanabe, where Kameda scored a second-round TKO.

=== Japanese Youth featherweight champion ===
After building a record of 6–2–1 with 5 knockouts, Kameda fought undefeated prospect Tsubasa Narai on 23 July 2021 for the vacant Japanese Youth featherweight title, where Kameda would score an impressive second-round knockout.

In his first defence on 13 November 2021, he would face Hiroki Hanabusa at the Edion Arena. Kameda lost the bout via 8-round unanimous decision, therefore losing his Youth title.

=== Kameda vs. Sor Rungvisai ===
On 20 October 2024 in the "To The Future vol. 32" card, Kameda faced Thai veteran and former WBC super flyweight champion Suriyan Sor Rungvisai in an 8-rounder bout in Osaka. Kameda would beat Sor Rungvisai via unanimous decision.

=== Kameda vs. Nery ===
On 16 January 2025, it was announced that Kameda would be facing former two-division world champion Luis Nery on 22 February 2025 in Auditorio Municipal, Tijuana, Mexico. On 11 February 2025, Kameda would be seen wearing an all-white attire, including a white bandana, showing arrogance to his foe, later, Nery pushed Kameda and threw hits that resulted in Kameda trying to come back before they were separated. In the bout, Kameda showcased his skills and best in front of his foe's hometown but would eventually be overwhelmed and stopped in the seventh round after being knocked down and followed up by more punches.

=== Kameda vs. Picasso ===
On 19 July 2025 at the Manny Pacquiao vs. Mario Barrios undercard in Las Vegas, Nevada, U.S., Kameda faced the highly-touted prospect David Picasso in a 10-round bout. Kameda would lose via majority decision with Picasso utilizing his jab and abilities.

=== Kameda vs. Casimero ===
Kameda fought three-division world champion John Riel Casimero to headline the SaikouXLush volume 2 event on 25 October 2025 in Bishkek, Kyrgyzstan. It was a catchweight bout at 58 kilograms (128 lbs). Kameda won via unanimous decision (92-98, 92-99, 93-97).

== Professional boxing record ==
24 fights	16 wins	6 losses
By knockout	9	2
By decision	7	4
Draws	2	

No.	Result	Record	Opponent	Type	Round, time	Date	Location	Notes
24	Loss	16–6–2	Sebastian Hernandez	SD	10	23 Sep 2026	Sumiyoshi Ward Center, Osaka, Japan	
23	Win	16–5–2	John Riel Casimero	UD	10	25 Oct 2025	Bishkek Arena, Bishkek, Kyrgyzstan	
22	Loss	15–5–2	David Picasso	MD	10	19 Jul 2025	MGM Grand Garden Arena, Paradise, Nevada, U.S.	
21	Loss	15–4–2	Luis Nery	TKO	7 (10), 2:23	22 Feb 2025	Auditorio Municipal, Tijuana, Mexico	
20	Win	15–3–2	Angelo Beltran	KO	1 (8), 1:18	21 Dec 2024	Twin Messe, Shizuoka, Japan	
19	Win	14–3–2	Suriyan Sor Rungvisai	UD	8	20 Oct 2024	KBS Hall, Kyoto, Japan	
18	Win	13–3–2	Mugicha Nakagawa	UD	8	28 Jul 2024	Shiga Daihatsu Arena, Ōtsu, Japan	
17	Win	12–3–2	Ryukyu Oho	UD	8	6 Apr 2024	Sangyō Shinkō Center, Sakai, Japan	
16	Win	11–3–2	Hikaru Matsuoka	KO	7 (8), 0:58	25 Nov 2023	EDION Arena Osaka, Osaka, Japan	
15	Draw	10–3–2	Mugicha Nakagawa	SD	8	11 Aug 2023	EDION Arena Osaka, Osaka, Japan	
14	Win	10–3–1	Petchbarngborn Kokietgym	UD	10	25 Feb 2023	ATC Hall, Osaka, Japan	
13	Win	9–3–1	Takaaki Kanai	KO	3 (8), 0:35	19 Nov 2022	EDION Arena Osaka, Osaka, Japan	
12	Win	8–3–1	Jon Jon Estrada	UD	8	23 Jul 2022	EDION Arena Osaka, Osaka, Japan	
11	Loss	7–3–1	Hiroki Hanabusa	UD	8	13 Nov 2021	EDION Arena Osaka, Osaka, Japan	Lost Japanese Youth featherweight title
10	Win	7–2–1	Tsubasa Narai	KO	2 (8), 2:49	23 Jul 2021	EDION Arena Osaka, Osaka, Japan	Won vacant Japanese Youth featherweight title
9	Win	6–2–1	Daiki Asai	TKO	2 (6), 0:39	28 Nov 2020	EDION Arena Osaka, Osaka, Japan	
8	Loss	5–2–1	Jinki Maeda	SD	4	22 Dec 2019	Korakuen Hall, Tokyo, Japan	
7	Win	5–1–1	Daiki Imanari	TKO	3 (5), 1:10	3 Nov 2019	Korakuen Hall, Tokyo, Japan	
6	Win	4–1–1	Weed Taichi	TKO	3 (4), 0:38	26 Sep 2019	Korakuen Hall, Tokyo, Japan	
5	draw	3–1–1	Ryugo Ushijima	SD	4	11 Jun 2019	Korakuen Hall, Tokyo, Japan	
4	Win	3–1	Takuya Inamori	RTD	3 (4) 3:00	1 Apr 2019	Korakuen Hall, Tokyo, Japan	
3	Win	2–1	Tom Mizokoshi	UD	4	12 Nov 2018	Korakuen Hall, Tokyo, Japan	
2	Win	1–1	Kazuyuki Watanabe	TKO	2 (4), 1:58	5 May 2018	Korakuen Hall, Tokyo, Japan	
1	Loss	0–1	Shinnosuke Kimoto	TKO	2 (4), 1:40	1 Jan 2018	Differ Ariake, Tokyo, Japan	

== Style ==
Kameda who stands at 5'9 tall and a wingspan of over 70 inches, prefers fights in the lower divisions of boxing, specifically featherweight. Despite the height and reach advantage Kameda has compared to the average boxers in his divisions, Kameda offers an aggressive pressure fighter style. He throws good hooks to the body and overhand shots to head, however, albeit, Kameda's defence and endurance is lacking. He is also described as arrogant and a "fight-seller" due to his attitude in face-offs.
