= Sebastian Hernandez =

Mexican boxer (born 2000)

Personal information
- Nickname: Logan
- Born: Sebastian Hernandez Reyes; October 19, 2000 (age 25) Tijuana, Baja California, Mexico
- Height: 5 ft 9 in (175 cm)
- Weight: Super-bantamweight; Featherweight

Boxing career
- Reach: 65 in (165 cm)
- Stance: Orthodox

Boxing record
- Total fights: 23
- Wins: 22
- Win by KO: 19
- Losses: 1

Sebastian Hernandez Reyes (born October 19, 2000) is a Mexican professional boxer.

== Professional career ==
Reyes competed against Junto Nakatani in a 12 round super bantamweight fight at Mohammed Abdo Arena in Riyadh, Saudi Arabia, on 27 December 2025. He lost the fight by unanimous decision.

On 23 September 2026, Reyes faced Kyonosuke Kameda in a 10 round featherweight fight. He won the fight by split decision.

== Professional boxing record ==
23 fights	22 wins	1 loss
By knockout	19	0
By decision	3	1

No.	Result	Record	Opponent	Type	Round, time	Date	Location	Notes
23	Win	22–1	Kyonosuke Kameda	SD	10	23 Sep 2026	Sumiyoshi Ward Center, Osaka, Japan	
22	Win	21–1	Jose Lopez	TKO	2 (10), 2:59	8 Aug 2026	Centro De Espectáculos Del Recinto Ferial, Metepec, Mexico	
21	Loss	20–1	Junto Nakatani	UD	12	27 Dec 2025	Mohammed Abdo Arena, Riyadh, Saudi Arabia	
20	Win	20–0	Azat Hovhannisyan	UD	10	10 May 2025	Pechanga Arena, San Diego, California, U.S.	
19	Win	19–0	Kevin Luis Munoz	KO	5 (10), 0:10	8 Mar 2025	Merida, Mexico	
18	Win	18–0	Sergio Martin Sosa	TKO	7 (10), 2:39	14 Dec 2024	Estadio Caliente, Tijuana, Mexico	
17	Win	17–0	Yonfrez Parejo	RTD	4 (8), 3:00	20 Sep 2024	Desert Diamond Arena, Glendale, Arizona, U.S.	
16	Win	16–0	Jose Armando Valdes Bernal	TKO	7 (10), 2:18	27 Apr 2024	Tijuana, Mexico	
15	Win	15–0	Noe Robles Salas	TKO	6 (8), 2:48	16 Dec 2023	La Casa de los Zonkeys, Tijuana, Mexico	
14	Win	14–0	Irvin Turrubiartes Perez	KO	5 (8), 2:28	14 Oct 2023	Poliforum Zamna, Merida, Mexico	
13	Win	13–0	Jesus Mercado Cabrera	KO	3 (6), 1:35	26 Aug 2023	Cuernavaca, Mexico	
12	Win	12–0	Jonathan Chanona Aguilar	TKO	3 (8), 0:10	6 May 2023	Auditorio Municipal, Tijuana, Mexico	
11	Win	11–0	Miguel Rojas Alba	KO	3 (8), 2:31	4 Nov 2022	La Casa de los Zonkeys, Tijuana, Mexico	
10	Win	10–0	Luis Angel Mandujano Solis	TKO	7 (8), 0:10	5 Aug 2022	La Casa de los Zonkeys, Tijuana, Mexico	
9	Win	9–0	Miguel Angel Rodriguez Vivanco	RTD	3 (8), 3:00	20 May 2022	La Casa de los Zonkeys, Tijuana, Mexico	
8	Win	8–0	Jose Angel Rojas Alba	TKO	4 (6), 2:42	4 Mar 2022	La Casa de los Zonkeys, Tijuana, Mexico	
7	Win	7–0	Jony Huitzil Colex	RTD	4 (6), 3:00	12 Nov 2021	Grand Hotel, Tijuana, Mexico	
6	Win	6–0	Kevin Rodriguez Garcia	TKO	2 (4), 1:00	23 Jul 2021	Grand Hotel, Tijuana, Mexico	
5	Win	5–0	Jose Francisco Ortiz Cervantes	TKO	4 (4), 2:47	29 May 2021	Grand Hotel, Tijuana, Mexico	
4	Win	4–0	Owen Rodriguez Gonzalez	TKO	3 (4), 2:50	9 Apr 2021	Grand Hotel, Tijuana, Mexico	
3	Win	3–0	Jerry Alexander Moroyoque Soto	TKO	2 (4), 2:05	12 Mar 2021	Big Punch Arena, Tijuana, Mexico	
2	Win	2–0	Mauro Gutierrez Ochoa	UD	4	22 Jan 2021	Cancha Beisball IMDET, Tijuana, Mexico	
1	Win	1–0	Oscar Barboza	RTD	1 (4), 3:00	27 Nov 2020	Bar Bosse, Tijuana, Mexico	
