= Masanori Rikiishi =

Japanese professional boxer (born 1994)

Personal information
- Nationality: Japanese
- Born: 佐藤政法; 10 June 1994 (age 32) Suzuka, Mie, Japan
- Height: 5 ft 9.5 in (177 cm)
- Weight: Super Featherweight

Boxing career
- Reach: 71.5 in (182 cm)
- Stance: Southpaw

Boxing record
- Total fights: 18
- Wins: 16
- Win by KO: 11
- Losses: 2

Masanori Rikiishi (力石政法, Rikiishi Masanori, born June 10, 1994) is a Japanese professional boxer. He challenged once for the IBF junior-lightweight world title in May, 2025.

== Amateur career ==
Rikiishi turned pro in 2017 ending his amateur career with a record of 25–5.

== Professional career ==
=== Rikiishi vs Saka ===
Rikiishi suffered an early setback in his pro career. He was stopped in just his third fight by veteran Kosuke Saka. Rikiishi couldn't keep Saka off him and was dropped by a right hand in the second round. Rikiishi rose but the referee soon intervened after another flurry by Saka.

=== Rikiishi vs Nunez ===
Rikiishi improved over his next couple of fights and became one of the best prospects in the super-featherweight division. Rikiishi took on the experienced Ricardo Nunez of Panama. Rikiishi stopped Nunez in the third round, dropping him with multiple body shots. After the fight Rikiishi called out world champion Emanuel Navarrete.

=== Rikiishi vs Magnesi ===
Rikiishi took on Michael Magnesi for the WBC Silver super-featherweight belt. In what was one of the fights of the year, Rikiishi who was behind on all 3 judges scorecards stopped Magnesi in the final round.Rikiishi dropped Magnesi early in the round but the Italian managed to beat the count. Rikiishi knocked Magnesi down again straight but once again he beat the count. Near the end Magnesi was given a third count for falling into the ropes from exhaustion. An onslaught from Rikiishi saw the fight been waved off.

== Professional boxing record ==
| 18 fights | 16 wins | 2 losses |
|---|---|---|
| By knockout | 11 | 1 |
| By decision | 5 | 1 |

| No. | Result | Record | Opponent | Type | Round, time | Date | Location | Notes |
|---|---|---|---|---|---|---|---|---|
| 17 | Loss | 16–2 | Eduardo Núñez | UD | 12 | 28 May 2025 | Yokohama Cultural Gymnasium, Yokohama, Japan | For vacant IBF super-featherweight title |
| 17 | Win | 16–1 | Arnel Baconaje | KO | 2 (10), 2:38 | 17 Oct 2024 | Korakuen Hall, Tokyo, Japan | |
| 16 | Win | 15–1 | Michael Magnesi | TKO | 12 (12), 2:34 | 22 Mar 2024 | Palazzetto Romboli, Colleferro, Italy | Won WBC Silver super-featherweight title |
| 15 | Win | 14–1 | Ricardo Nunez | KO | 3 (10), 2:16 | 10 Jun 2023 | Edion Arena Osaka, Osaka, Japan | |
| 14 | Win | 13–1 | Yoshimitsu Kimura | KO | 5 (12), 2:52 | 6 Jan 2023 | Edion Arena Osaka, Osaka, Japan | Won WBO Asia Pacific super-featherweight title |
| 13 | Win | 12–1 | Tomjune Mangubat | TKO | 4 (12), 2:45 | 14 Aug 2022 | Edion Arena Osaka, Osaka, Japan | Retained OPBF super-featherweight title |
| 12 | Win | 11–1 | Takuya Watanabe | UD | 12 | 15 May 2022 | Sumida City Gymnasium, Sumida, Japan | Won vacant OPBF super-featherweight title |
| 11 | Win | 10–1 | Roli Gasca | RTD | 4 (8), 3:00 | 16 Dec 2021 | Mielparque Hall, Osaka, Japan | |
| 10 | Win | 9–1 | Soreike Taichi | TKO | 3 (8), 1:25 | 1 Nov 2021 | Aioi Hall, Kariya, Japan | |
| 9 | Win | 8–1 | Yuichiro Kasuya | UD | 8 | 19 Aug 2020 | Korakuen Hall, Tokyo, Japan | |
| 8 | Win | 7–1 | Freddy Fonseca | UD | 8 | 15 Sep 2019 | Aioi Hall, Kariya, Japan | |
| 7 | Win | 6–1 | Shogo Yamaguchi | RTD | 5 (6), 3:00 | 23 Jul 2019 | Korakuen Hall, Tokyo, Japan | |
| 6 | Win | 5–1 | Kei Iwahara | UD | 8 | 17 Mar 2019 | Aioi Hall, Kariya, Japan | |
| 5 | Win | 4–1 | Genki Maeda | TKO | 5 (8), 2:41 | 2 Dec 2018 | Aioi Hall, Kariya, Japan | |
| 4 | Win | 3–1 | Egy Rozten | KO | 2 (6), 2:47 | 10 Aug 2018 | Korakuen Hall, Tokyo, Japan | |
| 3 | Loss | 2–1 | Kosuke Saka | TKO | 2 (8), 2:15 | 30 Apr 2018 | International Conference Hall, Nagoya, Japan | |
| 2 | Win | 2–0 | Pegasus Tanimoto | TKO | 3 (6), 0:31 | 26 Nov 2017 | Aioi Hall, Kariya, Japan | |
| 1 | Win | 1–0 | Sa Ya Lee | UD | 6 | 16 Jul 2017 | Aioi Hall, Kariya, Japan | |
