= Eduardo Núñez (boxer) =

Mexican boxer (born 1997)

Personal information
- Nickname: Sugar
- Born: José Eduardo Núñez Navarro; July 25, 1997 (age 29) Los Mochis, Sinaloa, Mexico
- Height: 5 ft 6 in (168 cm)
- Weight: Super featherweight

Boxing career
- Reach: 68 in (173 cm)
- Stance: Orthodox

Boxing record
- Total fights: 31
- Wins: 29
- Win by KO: 27
- Losses: 2

José Eduardo Núñez Navarro (born July 25, 1997) is a Mexican professional boxer who held the International Boxing Federation (IBF) junior-lightweight title from 2025 to 2026.

== Professional career ==
Núñez turned professional in 2015 after just five amateur bouts, compiling a record of 27–1 before facing Masanori Rikiishi for the vacant IBF super-featherweight title. Núñez entered the fight with a 100% knockout-to-win ratio, with his one defeat at that point being his only fight that had gone the distance. Said defeat came against Hiram Gallardo, who defeated Núñez via unanimous decision on account of a point deduction in the third round for low blows (without the deduction, the bout would have been a unanimous draw). This was the 11th bout of his career.

After 12 rounds, Núñez won by unanimous decision, his second fight to go the distance and his first decision victory.

=== Núñez vs. Diaz ===
Núñez made the first defense of his IBF junior lightweight title against Christopher Díaz at Centro de Usos Multiples in Los Mochis, Sinaloa, Mexico, on September 6, 2025. He won by unanimous decision.

=== Núñez vs. Navarrete ===
Núñez faced WBO junior-lightweight champion Emanuel Navarrete in a title unification bout at Desert Diamond Arena in Glendale, Arizona, USA, on February 28, 2026. He lost the fight by technical knockout at the start of the 11th round when the ringside doctor ruled an injury to his right eye was too bad for him to continue.

== Professional boxing record ==
31 fights	29 wins	2 losses
By knockout	27	1
By decision	2	1

No.	Result	Record	Opponent	Type	Round, time	Date	Location	Notes
31	Loss	29–2	Emanuel Navarrete	TKO	11 (12), 0:01	Feb 28, 2026	Desert Diamond Arena, Glendale, Arizona, U.S.	Lost IBF junior lightweight title; For WBO junior lightweight title
30	Win	29–1	Christopher Díaz	UD	12	Sep 6, 2025	Centro de Usos Multiples, Los Mochis, Sinaloa, Mexico	Retained IBF junior lightweight title
29	Win	28–1	Masanori Rikiishi	UD	12	May 28, 2025	Yokohama Buntai, Yokohama, Japan	Won vacant IBF junior lightweight title
28	Win	27–1	Miguel Marriaga	RTD	6 (10), 3:00	Aug 31, 2024	Dignity Health Sports Park, Carson, California, U.S.	
27	Win	26–1	Óscar Escandón	TKO	2 (10), 0:38	Oct 28, 2023	Polifórum Benito Juárez, Cancún, Quintana Roo, Mexico	
26	Win	25–1	Jesus Martin Ceyca	KO	2 (10), 2:14	Mar 4, 2023	Polideportivo Juan S. Millan, Culiacán, Sinaloa, Mexico	
25	Win	24–1	Willmank Canonico Brito	TKO	10 (10), 2:21	Sep 30, 2022	Culiacán, Sinaloa, Mexico	
24	Win	23–1	Adrian Pacheco Perez	TKO	10 (10), 2:20	Apr 1, 2022	Plaza de Toros, Ciudad Guzmán, Jalisco, Mexico	
23	Win	22–1	Osvaldo Maldonado	TKO	9 (10), 1:02	Oct 15, 2021	Auditorio Benito Juarez, Los Mochis, Sinaloa, Mexico	
22	Win	21–1	Guillermo Avila Godinez	KO	5 (10), 2:55	Feb 27, 2021	Gimnasio Kochul, Los Mochis, Sinaloa, Mexico	
21	Win	20–1	Gerson Escobar Romero	TKO	6 (8), 1:50	Dec 14, 2019	Domo Deportivo, Tulum, Quintana Roo, Mexico	
20	Win	19–1	Josue Veraza	KO	2 (8), 2:33	Nov 23, 2019	Gimnasio Josué Neri Santos, Ciudad Juárez, Chihuahua, Mexico	
19	Win	18–1	Rafael Hernandez	TKO	1 (10), 2:33	Sep 20, 2019	Gimnasio Independente, Monterrey, Nuevo León, Mexico	
18	Win	17–1	Jesus Arevalo	KO	2 (8), 1:10	Jul 20, 2019	Mazatlán, Sinaloa, Mexico	
17	Win	16–1	Juan Jimenez	TKO	3 (8), 2:34	Jun 7, 2019	Hotel Ixtapa Azul, Zihuatanejo, Guerrero, Mexico	
16	Win	15–1	Cecilio Santos	KO	2 (8), 1:59	Apr 12, 2019	Los Mochis, Sinaloa, Mexico	
15	Win	14–1	Everardo Ceballos Alvelaiz	TKO	2 (6), 0:43	Dec 8, 2018	Domo Binacional, Heroica Nogales, Sonora, Mexico	
14	Win	13–1	Adalberto Garcia Covarrubias	TKO	2 (6), 0:55	Oct 13, 2018	Sala de Armas Agustín Melgar, Iztacalco, Mexico City, Mexico	
13	Win	12–1	Jose Vega Ochoa	KO	1 (10), 1:24	Sep 1, 2018	Palenque de la Expo, Ciudad Obregón, Sonora, Mexico	Won vacant WBC Youth Silver featherweight title
12	Win	11–1	Jesus Valle Armenta	KO	2 (10), 2:44	Aug 15, 2018	Arena Big Star Boxing, Guasave, Sinaloa Mexico	
11	Loss	10–1	Hiram Gallardo	UD	6	Jun 29, 2018	Grand Oasis Arena, Cancún, Quintana Roo, Mexico	
10	Win	10–0	Victoriano Nunez	TKO	3 (6), 2:15	Mar 2, 2018	Polideportivo Centenario, Los Mochis, Sinaloa, Mexico	
9	Win	9–0	Jesus Lopez Perez	KO	4 (6), 2:21	Oct 20, 2017	Polideportivo Centenario, Los Mochis, Sinaloa, Mexico	
8	Win	8–0	Mario Sanchez Mendez	TKO	1 (6), 2:15	Sep 8, 2017	Polideportivo Centenario, Los Mochis, Sinaloa, Mexico	
7	Win	7–0	Aaron Aguilar	RTD	5 (8), 3:00	Jun 16, 2017	Polideportivo Centenario, Los Mochis, Sinaloa, Mexico	
6	Win	6–0	Jhovany Armenta Inzunza	KO	2 (6), 2:26	Apr 29, 2017	Cancha Tecate, El Fuerte, Sinaloa Mexico	
5	Win	5–0	Juan Beltran Dominguez	TKO	5 (8), 2:24	Apr 1, 2017	Cancha Tecate, Sinaloa de Leyva, Sinaloa, Mexico	
4	Win	4–0	Jesus Alcaraz	KO	3 (4), 2:25	Jan 21, 2017	Club Deportivo Tecate de Bachoco, Guasave, Sinaloa, Mexico	
3	Win	3–0	Juan Carlos Flores Torres	KO	2 (6), 2:25	Oct 14, 2016	Score Sports Bar, Guasave, Sinaloa, Mexico	
2	Win	2–0	Marco Vargas	KO	3 (4), 1:12	Jul 2, 2016	Gimnasio Josué Neri Santos, Ciudad Juárez, Chihuahua, Mexico	
1	Win	1–0	Brian Santillanes Camacho	KO	1 (4), 1:24	Sep 26, 2015	Centro Convenciones, Puerto Peñasco, Sonora, Mexico	

== See also ==
- List of male boxers
- List of Mexican boxing world champions
- List of world super-featherweight boxing champions

Sporting positions
Regional boxing titles
Vacant Title last held by Yiran Li	WBC Youth Silver featherweight champion September 1, 2018 – 2019; Vacated	Vacant Title next held by Christian Olivo Barreda
World boxing titles
Vacant Title last held by Anthony Cacace	IBF junior-lightweight champion May 28, 2025 – February 28, 2026	Succeeded by Emanuel Navarrete
