= Willibaldo García =

Mexican boxer (born 1989)

Personal information
- Nickname: Sullo
- Born: Willibaldo García Pérez; December 24, 1989 (age 36) Copala, Guerrero, Mexico
- Height: 5 ft 4 in (163 cm)
- Weight: Super flyweight; Bantamweight

Boxing career
- Stance: Orthodox

Boxing record
- Total fights: 33
- Wins: 23
- Win by KO: 13
- Losses: 7
- Draws: 2
- No contests: 1

Willibaldo García Pérez (born December 24, 1989) is a Mexican professional boxer who held the International Boxing Federation (IBF) junior bantamweight title from May 2025 to June 2026.

== Professional career ==
A relatively late starter to the sport, García turned professional in 2017 at the age of 28. Within the first year of his career, he had accumulated a record of 2–4–1 (1 NC), with all of his losses coming by way of decision. However, by the end of 2024, he had improved to 22–6–1 (1 NC), losing only to future champion Alexandro Santiago by majority decision, and then later to former champion Paul Butler by split decision.

Having thus built himself up as a respectable contender, he was scheduled to face the undefeated Rene Calixto Bibiano in December 2024 for the vacant IBF super-flyweight title. The bout would end in a split-decision draw, and a rematch was reordered. They fought again five months later on May 23, 2025. This time, García would win via split decision, claiming the vacant title.

García made the first defense of his title against Andrew Moloney at the Aichi Sky Expo in Tokoname, Japan, on 6 June 2026. He lost by majority decision with the judges' scorecards reading 115–113, 115–113 and 114–114.

== Professional boxing record ==
33 fights	23 wins	7 losses
By knockout	13	0
By decision	10	7
Draws	2	
No contests	1	

No.	Result	Record	Opponent	Type	Round, time	Date	Location	Notes
33	Loss	23–7–2 (1)	Andrew Moloney	MD	12	Jun 6, 2026	Aichi Sky Expo, Tokoname, Japan	Lost IBF super-flyweight title
32	Win	23–6–2 (1)	Rene Calixto	SD	12	May 23, 2025	Zacatecas City, Zacatecas, Mexico	Won vacant IBF super-flyweight title
31	Draw	22–6–2 (1)	Rene Calixto	SD	12	Dec 21, 2024	Twin Messe, Shizuoka, Japan	For vacant IBF super-flyweight title
30	Win	22–6–1 (1)	Carlos Bautista Sánchez	TKO	1 (10), 2:41	Jun 22, 2024	Hermosillo, Sonora, Mexico	
29	Win	21–6–1 (1)	Rigo Omar Martínez Hernández	UD	8	Feb 9, 2024	Salon Marbet Plus, Ciudad Nezahualcóyotl, Mexico	
28	Win	20–6–1 (1)	Marlon Ríos Sarinana	TKO	8 (10)	Apr 22, 2023	Chihuahua City, Chihuhua, Mexico	Won vacant IBF Latino super-flyweight title
27	Win	19–6–1 (1)	Víctor Méndez	TKO	7 (8), 1:16	Dec 14, 2022	Guasave, Sinaloa Mexico	
26	Win	18–6–1 (1)	Christian Henríquez Ibarra	KO	3 (8), 1:52	Oct 21, 2022	Guasave, Sinaloa, Mexico	
25	Win	17–6–1 (1)	Hector Ruiz Soto	RTD	4 (8), 3:00	Aug 10, 2022	Nubo Disco Bar, Guasave, Mexico	
24	Win	16–6–1 (1)	Jesus Fierro Verdugo	UD	6	Nay 14, 2022	Club de Veteranos, Sinaloa de Leyva, Mexico	
23	Win	15–6–1 (1)	Patricio Camacho Valdez	KO	2 (8), 1:17	Dec 22, 2021	Landeros Gym, Guasave, Mexico	
22	Win	14–6–1 (1)	José Núñez López	UD	8	Nov 13, 2021	Salon SNTE 53, Guasave, Mexico	
21	Win	13–6–1 (1)	José Villegas Somoza	KO	2 (6), 0:30	Sep 25, 2021	Big Punch Arena, Tijuana, Mexico	
20	Loss	12–6–1 (1)	Paul Butler	SD	10	Jun 25, 2021	Bolton Whites Hotel, Bolton, England	For vacant WBO International bantamweight title
19	Win	12–5–1 (1)	Oscar Nery Plata	UD	8	Feb 6, 2021	Jardines del Pedregal, Hermosillo, Mexico	
18	Win	11–5–1 (1)	Raul Esquer	TKO	9 (10), 0:52	Dec 17, 2020	Preparatoria 16 de septiembre Maestros Federales, Mexicali, Mexico	
17	Loss	10–5–1 (1)	Alexandro Santiago	MD	10	Sep 21, 2020	Cadena, Baja California, Mexico	For WBC International bantamweight title
16	Win	10–4–1 (1)	Dewayne Beamon	UD	10	Feb 1, 2020	Big Punch Arena, Tijuana, Mexico	
15	Win	9–4–1 (1)	Alberto Ascanio	TKO	2 (6), 1:58	Oct 4, 2019	Salon SNTE 53, Guasave, Mexico	
14	Win	8–4–1 (1)	Elias Aguilar Contreras	KO	1 (4), 1:06	Sep 7, 2019	Big Punch Arena, Tijuana, Mexico	
13	Win	7–4–1 (1)	Christian Quezada García	TKO	1 (6), 2:42	Jun 1, 2019	Big Punch Arena, Tijuana, Mexico	
12	Win	6–4–1 (1)	Francisco Mendivil	MD	6	Apr 5, 2019	Centro de Espectaculos, Tijuana, Mexico	
11	Win	5–4–1 (1)	Jesus Enrique Arenas Osuna	UD	6	Feb 9, 2019	Big Punch Arena, Tijuana, Mexico	
10	Win	4–4–1 (1)	Cuahutli Guerrero	TKO	4 (6), 0:51	Dec 22, 2018	Auditorio Fausto Gutierrez Moreno, Tijuana, Mexico	
9	Win	3–4–1 (1)	José Ramírez Maciel	MD	4	Nov 17, 2018	Plaza de Toros Calafia, Mexicali, Mexico	
8	Draw	2–4–1 (1)	Misael Gracia Acevedo	SD	6	Oct 20, 2018	Big Punch Arena, Tijuana, Mexico	
7	Win	2–4 (1)	Luis Valdés Peña	SD	4	Aug 10, 2018	Grand Hotel, Tijuana, Mexico	
6	Loss	1–4 (1)	Rafael Marzan	MD	4	Jun 23, 2018	Caliente Hipódromo, Tijuana, Mexico	
5	Loss	1–3 (1)	Dewayne Beamon	UD	6	Jun 9, 2018	Auditorio Municipal, Tijuana, Mexico	
4	NC	1–2 (1)	Geovani Andrade	NC	3 (4), 1:52	Apr 7, 2018	Gimnasio Burocratas, Tijuana, Mexico	Andrade unable to continue after accidental foul
3	Loss	1–2	Rafael Alexander Delgado	UD	4	Mar 10, 2018	Gimnasio Burocratas, Tijuana, Mexico	
2	Loss	1–1	Esteban Camacho Varo	MD	4	Feb 8, 2018	Rancho Grande Bar, Tijuana, Mexico	
1	Win	1–0	Alejandro Zepeda Cuevas	TKO	2 (4), 2:14	Oct 14, 2017	Salon de Eventos del Hotel Posada del Sol, San Felipe, Mexico	

== See also ==
- List of male boxers
- List of Mexican boxing world champions
- List of world super-flyweight boxing champions

Sporting positions
Regional boxing titles
Vacant Title last held by Diego Luis Pichardo Liriano	IBF Latino super-flyweight champion April 22, 2023 – May 23, 2025; Won world title	Vacant
World boxing titles
Vacant Title last held by Fernando Martínez	IBF super-flyweight champion May 23, 2025 – present	Incumbent
