= Kevin Jake Cataraja =

Filipino boxer

Personal information
- Nickname: KJ
- Nationality: (Philippines) Filipino
- Born: Kevin Jake Dionson Cataraja; May 6, 1995 (age 31) Cebu City, Philippines
- Height: 5 ft 5½ in (1.66 m)
- Weight: Flyweight; Super Flyweight

Boxing career
- Reach: 65½ in (167 cm)
- Stance: Orthodox

Boxing record
- Total fights: 18
- Wins: 17
- Win by KO: 13
- Losses: 1
- Draws: 0

Kevin Jake Dionson Cataraja (born May 6, 1995) is a Filipino professional boxer. He is a former OPBF Super Flyweight champion.

== Education ==
Cataraja attended University of Cebu for his collegiate studies obtaining a degree in criminology in 2017.

== Boxing career ==
=== Flyweight division ===
On 11 July 2015, Cataraja made his professional debut in boxing. Cataraja defeated Indonesian boxer Ardi Tefa via a Round 6 knockout (KO). 4 months after his debut, Cataraja defeated Indonesian boxer Ellias Nggenggo via a Round 4 technical knockout (TKO). 3 months later, Cataraja registered another victory by defeating Mexican boxer Pedro Antonio Rodriguez, winning a unanimous decision (UD) through eight rounds.

On 28 May 2016, Cataraja extended his winning streak in just 3 months after his win against Rodriguez by defeating Thai boxer Wanchai Nianghansa via a Round 4 technical knockout (TKO).

=== Super Flyweight division ===
Following the bout, Cataraja moved up one division, to super flyweight, defeated fellow Filipino boxer John Kenan Villaflor six months after his latest bout, winning a technical knockout (TKO) in the first round. Cataraja's next bout was against Lony Cadayday, that was his second match against a Filipino boxer. Cataraja won via a Round 1 knockout (KO).

On 16 September 2017, Cataraja extended his winning streak by defeating Wiljan Ugbaniel via a Round 2 knockout (KO). Ugbaniel was Cataraja's third Filipino opponent. 9 months later, Cataraja registered another victory by defeating Indonesian boxer Frengky Rohi via a Round 3 technical knockout (TKO).

On 24 November 2018, Cataraja defeated Mexican boxer Victor Hugo Reyes winning a unanimous decision (UD) through ten rounds. Cataraja won the vacant WBO Youth Super Flyweight Title. Cataraja's next bout was against Delfin de Asis, that was his fourth match against a Filipino boxer. Cataraja won via a Round 3 technical knockout (TKO).

In September 2019, Cataraja registered his 11th-straight win against fellow Filipino boxer, Crison Omayao, winning the match via a third-round TKO.

In December 2020, more than one year from his previous fight, Cataraja returned to the ring and defeated fellow Filipino boxer John Mark Apolinario via a Round 1 knockout (KO).

It was reported that Cataraja was scheduled to face fellow Filipino boxer, Cris Alfante ion 16 July 2021. Cataraja defeated Alfante via a Round 7 (TKO).

Cataraja was scheduled to face Romshane Sarguilla on 26 February 2022. He defeated Sarguilla via a Round 3 (TKO).

On 11 February 2023, Cataraja won the OPBF Super Flyweight title by defeating fellow Filipino boxer Edward Heno via a unanimous decision (UD).

== Professional boxing record ==
18 fights	17 wins	1 loss
By knockout	13	0
By decision	4	1
Draws	0	

Result	Record	Opponent	Type	Round, time	Date	Location	Notes
Loss	17–1	Kenbun Torres	SD	10	2024-08-24	Yamato Arena, Suita, Japan	
Win	17–0	Jun Blazo	UD	8	2024-02-13	Midas Hotel and Casino, Pasay, Philippines	
Win	16–0	Edward Heno	UD	12	2023-02-11	Sanman Gym, General Santos, Philippines	Won vacant OPBF Super Flyweight title
Win	15–0	Ronel Dela Cruz	KO	1 (8), 2:28	2022-08-28	Sanman Gym, General Santos, Philippines	
Win	14–0	Romshane Sarguilla	RTD	3 (8), 3:00	2022-02-26	Sanman Gym, General Santos, Philippines	
Win	13–0	Cris Alfante	TKO	7 (8), 2:23	2021-07-16	Tabunok Sports Complex, Talisay City, Philippines	
Win	12–0	John Mark Apolinario	KO	1 (10)	2020-12-17	Sanman Gym, General Santos, Philippines	
Win	11–0	Crison Omayao	TKO	3 (10), 2:13	2019-09-23	PMI Colleges Bohol - Taloto Campus, Tagbilaran City, Bohol, Philippines	
Win	10–0	Delfin de Asis	TKO	3 (10), 1:30	2019-07-26	Passi, Iloilo, Philippines	
Win	9–0	Victor Hugo Reyes	UD	10	2018-11-24	IC3 Convention Center, Cebu City, Philippines	Won vacant WBO Youth Super Flyweight title
Win	8–0	Frengky Rohi	TKO	3 (10), 2:44	2018-06-16	Tabuelan Astrodome, Tabuelan, Cebu, Philippines	
Win	7–0	Wiljan Ugbaniel	KO	2 (8), 1:56	2017-09-16	Waterfront Hotel & Casino, Cebu City, Philippines	
Win	6–0	Lony Cadayday	TKO	1 (8), 1:47	2017-07-08	IC3 Convention Center, Cebu City, Philippines	
Win	5–0	John Kenan Villaflor	TKO	1 (6), 0:31	2016-11-26	Cebu Coliseum, Cebu City, Philippines	
Win	4–0	Wanchai Nianghansa	TKO	4 (8), 0:14	2016-05-28	La Salle Coliseum, Bacolod, Philippines	
Win	3–0	Pedro Antonio Rodriguez	UD	8	2016-02-27	Waterfront Hotel & Casino, Cebu City, Philippines	
Win	2–0	Ellias Nggenggo	TKO	4 (6), 2:43	2015-11-28	Hoops Dome, Lapu-Lapu City, Philippines	
Win	1–0	Ardi Tefa	KO	6 (6), 2:19	2015-07-11	Waterfront Hotel & Casino, Cebu City, Philippines	

== Titles in boxing ==
=== Minor titles ===
- WBO Youth Super Flyweight title (115 lbs)
- OPBF Super Flyweight title (115 lbs)
