= Super featherweight =

Weight division in professional boxing: 57–59 kg

Super featherweight, also known as junior lightweight, is a weight division in professional boxing, contested between 126 pounds (57 kg) and 130 pounds (59 kg).

== History ==
The super-featherweight division appeared in two distinct historical periods, from 1921 to 1934 and 1949 to the present. This weight class was established by the New York Walker Law in 1920, known as the junior-lightweight division. In 1921, Johnny Dundee would defeat George Chaney by a fifth-round DQ to become the division's first universally recognized world champion, as acknowledged by the New York State Athletic Commission (NYSAC). In 1924, Steve Sullivan would then defeat the reigning Dundee by a 10-round UD to win The Ring magazine's inaugural title in the division. In 1927, the National Boxing Association (NBA) (the direct predecessor to the World Boxing Association (WBA)), awarded their inaugural title to reigning world champion Tod Morgan.

The NYSAC abolished the division in 1930 due to suspicions of fight-fixing after Benny Bass won the title from Tod Morgan the previous year, a fight in which Morgan dominated the first round before suffering a sudden second-round stoppage, all after bookmakers had placed unusually high odds on him to win just before the fight began. The NBA and The Ring both upheld Bass' win, and the division continued to be recognized at least outside of New York. However, during the reign of Kid Chocolate, The Ring discontinued its junior-lightweight ratings in 1931, with the NBA initially following suit in 1932. Kid Chocolate would be briefly reinstated as champion by the NBA in 1933, which continued to recognize the division until Frankie Klick vacated the title in 1934. After this, the division was largely abandoned until 1949, when Sandy Saddler won the vacant NBA junior-lightweight title after defeating Orlando Zulueta by a 10-round SD, continuing to hold on to the title until 1957 to stay at featherweight.

In 1962, reigning WBA (Note: The NBA had changed its name to the WBA on August 23, 1962.) champion Flash Elorde was named by The Ring magazine as junior-lightweight champion of the world, 31 years after they had initially withdrawn recognition of the division. He would then go on to win the inaugural World Boxing Council (WBC) super-featherweight title in 1963 by defeating Johnny Bizarro by a 15-round UD. The inaugural champion for the International Boxing Federation (IBF) was Hwan-Kil Yuh in 1984, who won the title by defeating Rod Sequenan via a 15-round SD. The first World Boxing Organization champion was John John Molina in 1989, defeating Juan Laporte by a 12-round UD to win the title.

Some other notable fighters to hold championship titles at this weight include Brian Mitchell, Arturo Gatti, Vasiliy Lomachenko, Alexis Argüello, Azumah Nelson, Julio César Chávez, Diego Corrales, Floyd Mayweather Jr., Érik Morales, Marco Antonio Barrera, Acelino Freitas, Juan Manuel Márquez, Oscar De La Hoya, Rocky Lockridge, and Manny Pacquiao.

== Current world champions ==
Sanctioning body	Reign began	Champion	Record	Defenses
WBA	March 14, 2026	Anthony Cacace	25-1 (9 KO)	0
WBC	November 2, 2024	O'Shaquie Foster	24–3 (12 KO)	2
IBF	October 24, 2026	O'Shaquie Foster	24–3 (12 KO)	0
WBO	October 24, 2026	O'Shaquie Foster	24–3 (12 KO)	0

== Current world rankings ==
=== The Ring ===
As of August 16, 2025.

Keys:

C Current The Ring world champion

Rank	Name	Record	Title(s)
C	vacant		
1	O'Shaquie Foster	23–3 (12 KO)	WBC
2	Emanuel Navarrete	39–2–1–1 (33 KO)	WBO IBF
3	Anthony Cacace	24–1 (9 KO)	WBA
4	Lamont Roach Jr.	25–1–2 (10 KO)	
5	Eduardo Núñez	28–2 (27 KO)	
6	Robson Conceição	19–3–1–1 (9 KO)	
7	Eduardo Hernández	37–2 (32 KO)	
8	Charly Suarez	18–0–0–1 (10 KO)	
9	Raymond Ford	18–1–1 (8 KO)	
10	Jazza Dickens	36–5 (15 KO)	

=== BoxRec ===
As of 5 January 2024.

Rank	Name	Record	Title(s)
1	Emanuel Navarrete	39–2–1-1 (33 KO)	WBO IBF
2	O'Shaquie Foster	22–3 (12 KO)	WBC
3	Joe Cordina	17–1 (9 KO)	
4	Shavkatdzhon Rakhimov	17–2–1 (14 KO)	
5	Lamont Roach Jr.	25–1–1 (9 KO)	WBA (Regular)
6	Masanori Rikiishi	15–1 (10 KO)	
7	Robson Conceição	19–2–1–1 (8 KO)	
8	Mark Magsayo	26–2 (17 KO)	
9	Elnur Samedov	17–1 (7 KO)	
10	Anthony Cacace	22–1 (8 KO)	
