= Amagasaki Cultural Center =

Coordinates: 34°43′16″N 135°25′13″E

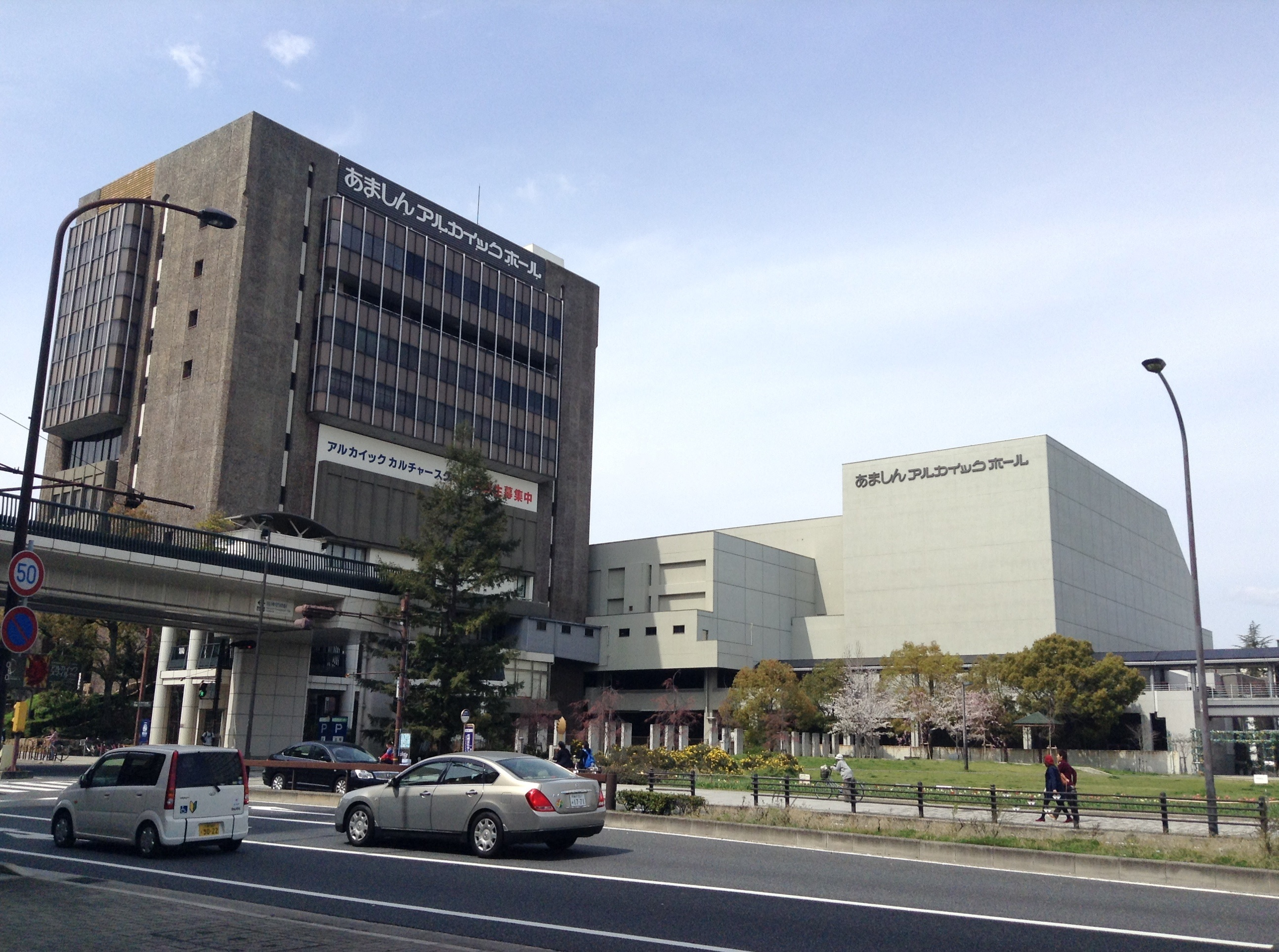
Amagasaki Cultural Center

The Amagasaki Cultural Center (尼崎市総合文化センター) is a complex located in Amagasaki, Japan. The building, which opened in 1975, has three concerts halls. The "Archaic Hall" is the largest and seats 2,030 people. Notable past performers include Roger Daltrey, Yes, The Smashing Pumpkins, INXS, Santana and Alcatrazz.
