= List of current boxing rankings =

This is a list of current men's professional boxing rankings, which includes the latest rankings by each one of the sport's four major sanctioning bodies, as well as other well-regarded sites and entities.

== Overview ==
As professional boxing has four major sanctioning bodies (WBA, WBC, IBF, WBO) each with their own champions, the sport does not have a centralized ranking system. The rankings published by these organizations share the trait of not ranking the other organizations' champions, as each one of the sanctioning bodies expects their champion to frequently defend their title against their top-ranked contender. The WBA often has more than one champion, none of which are ranked by the other three sanctioning bodies. Their "Super" and "Regular" champions are excluded from the rankings but their "Interim" champion is affixed to the number one spot. The IBF's protocol is for the top two spots in its rankings to remain vacant until two of its other top-ranked contenders face off, at which point the winner takes one of those two places.

In addition to the rankings published by the major sanctioning bodies, the TBRB and The Ring each publish their own independent rankings, not excluding any organizations' champions. The aim of both the TBRB and The Ring is to crown a single champion for each division. These lists are subjective and derived by a committee. Since the 1990s, other parties have experimented with objective computerized rankings, but these are sometimes regarded as incapable of accounting for all of boxing's quirks and subtleties. The most widely known computerized rankings are published by BoxRec and updated daily. The following is a list compiling the latest instalment of all the previously mentioned rankings. There are 18 weight classes ranging from Heavyweight to Strawweight.

== Current boxing rankings ==
As of 23rd August 2025

C	Champion
S	Super champion
R	Regular champion
I	Interim champion

=== Heavyweight (224 lbs+ - 101.60 kg+) ===
Rank	BoxRec	TBRB	The Ring	WBA	WBC	IBF	WBO
C	Oleksandr Usyk (Ukraine)	Oleksandr Usyk (Ukraine)	Oleksandr Usyk (Ukraine)	Murat Gassiev (Russia)	Agit Kabayel (Germany)	Filip Hrgović (Croatia)	Daniel Dubois (United Kingdom)
1	Daniel Dubois (United Kingdom)	Martin Bakole (Democratic Republic of the Congo)	Daniel Dubois (United Kingdom)	Jarrell Miller (United States)	Tyson Fury (United Kingdom)	Frank Sánchez (Cuba)	Oleksandr Usyk (Ukraine)
2	Agit Kabayel (Germany)	Zhilei Zhang (China)	Agit Kabayel (Germany)	Tyson Fury (United Kingdom)	Lawrence Okolie (United Kingdom)	Vacant	Tyson Fury (United Kingdom)
3	Murat Gassiev (Russia)	Anthony Joshua (United Kingdom)	Tyson Fury (United Kingdom)	Anthony Joshua (United Kingdom)	Moses Itauma (United Kingdom)	Vacant	Anthony Joshua (United Kingdom)
4	Anthony Joshua (United Kingdom)	Joseph Parker (New Zealand)	Filip Hrgović (Croatia)	Vartan Arutyunyan (Russia)	Filip Hrgović (Croatia)	Moses Itauma (United Kingdom)	Fabio Wardley (United Kingdom)
5	Tyson Fury (United Kingdom)	Filip Hrgović (Croatia)	Fabio Wardley (United Kingdom)	Nelson Hysa (Albania)	Anthony Joshua (United Kingdom)	Anthony Joshua (United Kingdom)	Moses Itauma (United Kingdom)
6	Filip Hrgović (Croatia)	Jared Anderson (United States)	Frank Sanchez (Cuba)	Dainier Pero (Cuba)	Frank Sánchez (Cuba)	Bakhodir Jalolov (Uzbekistan)	Joseph Parker (New Zealand)
7	Lawrence Okolie (United Kingdom)	Frank Sánchez (Cuba)	Efe Ajagba (Nigeria)	Moses Itauma (United Kingdom)	Deontay Wilder (United States)	Tyson Fury (United Kingdom)	Bakhodir Jalolov (Uzbekistan)
8	Fabio Wardley (United Kingdom)	Agit Kabayel (Germany)	Moses Itauma (United Kingdom)	Gurgen Hovhannisyan (Armenia)	Rico Verhoeven (Netherlands)	Fabio Wardley (United Kingdom)	Frank Sanchez (Cuba)
9	Richard Riakporhe (United Kingdom)	Daniel Dubois (United Kingdom)	Murat Gassiev (Russia)	Artem Suslenkov (Russia)	Efe Ajagba (Nigeria)	Deontay Wilder (United States)	Deontay Wilder (United States)
10	Frank Sanchez (Cuba)	Deontay Wilder (United States)	Justis Huni (New Zealand)	Efe Ajagba (Nigeria)	Richard Riakporhe (United Kingdom)	Richard Riakporhe (United Kingdom)	Nelson Hysa (Albania)

=== Bridgerweight (224 lbs - 101.60 kg) ===
Rank	BoxRec	TBRB	The Ring	WBA	WBC	IBF	WBO
C	—N/a	—N/a	—N/a	Muslim Gadzhimagomedov; Georgiy Yunovidov (I)	Ryad Merhy; Krzysztof Wlodarczyk (I)	—N/a	—N/a
1	—N/a	—N/a	—N/a	Julio Cesar La Cruz	Andrew Tabiti	—N/a	—N/a
2	—N/a	—N/a	—N/a	Evgeny Romanov	Kris Terzievski	—N/a	—N/a
3	—N/a	—N/a	—N/a	Georgiy Yunovidov	Ryad Merhy	—N/a	—N/a
4	—N/a	—N/a	—N/a	Leon Harth	Julio Cesar La Cruz	—N/a	—N/a
5	—N/a	—N/a	—N/a	Andrew Tabiti	Carlouse Welch	—N/a	—N/a
6	—N/a	—N/a	—N/a	Dilan Prašović	Adam Balski	—N/a	—N/a
7	—N/a	—N/a	—N/a	Ryad Merhy	Umar Salamov	—N/a	—N/a
8	—N/a	—N/a	—N/a	Kris Terzievski	Alexander Nedbei	—N/a	—N/a
9	—N/a	—N/a	—N/a	Kem Ljungquist	Tommy Welch	—N/a	—N/a
10	—N/a	—N/a	—N/a	Tommy Welch	Oleksandr Hrytsiv	—N/a	—N/a

=== Cruiserweight (200 lbs - 90.72 kg) ===
Rank	BoxRec	TBRB	The Ring	WBA	WBC	IBF	WBO
C	David Benavidez	Jai Opetaia	Jai Opetaia	David Benavidez Jai Opetaia (R)	Noel Mikaelian; Michał Cieślak (I)	Vacant	David Benavidez
1	Jai Opetaia	Mairis Briedis	David Benavidez	Yuniel Dorticos	Ryan Rozicki	Vacant	Chris Billam-Smith
2	Gilberto Ramírez	Lawrence Okolie	Gilberto Ramirez	Arsen Goulamirian	Yamil Peralta	Viddal Riley	Roman Fress
3	Chris Billam-Smith	Badou Jack	Chris Billiam-Smith	Leonardo Mosquea	Jai Opetaia	Michał Cieślak	Callum Johnson
4	Umar Salamov	Richard Riakporhe	Michał Cieślak	Lenar Perez	Viddal Riley	Mairis Briedis	Umar Salamov
5	Viddal Riley	Alexei Papin	Noel Mikaelian	Aloys Youmbi	Leonardo Mosquea	Mateusz Masternak	Kevin Melhus
6	Lenar Perez	Chris Billam-Smith	Badou Jack	Mike Perez	Badou Jack	Yves Ngabu	Tahir Kahrovic
7	Mike Perez	Yuniel Dorticos	Viddal Riley	Firat Arslan	Ilunga Makabu	Cheavon Clarke	Robin Sirwan Safar
8	Muslim Gadzhimagomedov	Ilunga Makabu	Ryan Rozicki	Umar Salamov	Kevin Ramirez	Issac Chamberlain	Mateusz Masternak
9	Robin Sirwan Safar	Mateusz Masternak	Leonardo Mosquea	Chris Billam-Smith	Yuniel Dorticos	Krzystof Wlodarczyk	Yuniel Dorticos
10	Cheavon Clarke	Arsen Goulamirian	Robin Sirwan Safar	Joe Smith Jr.	Efetobor Apochi	Marcus Browne	Richard Riakporhe

=== Light heavyweight (175 lbs - 79.38 kg) ===
Rank	BoxRec	TBRB	The Ring	WBA	WBC	IBF	WBO
C	Dmitry Bivol	Dmitry Bivol	Dmitry Bivol	Dmitry Bivol; David Benavidez (R)	David Benavidez	Dmitry Bivol	Dmitry Bivol; Callum Smith (I)
1	Artur Beterbiev	Artur Beterbiev	Artur Beterbiev	Artur Beterbiev	Artur Beterbiev	Michael Eifert	Callum Smith
2	David Benavidez	Joshua Buatsi	David Benavidez	David Morrell	David Morrell	vacant	Artur Beterbiev
3	Callum Smith	Callum Smith	Callum Smith	Albert Ramírez	Albert Ramírez	Joshua Buatsi	Anthony Yarde
4	Albert Ramírez	Joe Smith Jr.	Joshua Buatsi	Anthony Yarde	Oleksandr Gvozdyk	Anthony Yarde	David Morrell
5	David Morrel	Gilberto Ramírez	Anthony Yarde	Arlen López	Anthony Yarde	Ali Izmailov	Zach Parker
6	Joshua Buatsi	Anthony Yarde	Albert Ramírez	Sharabutdin Ataev	Joshua Buatsi	Albert Ramírez	Joshua Buatsi
7	Oleksandr Gvozdyk	Jean Pascal	Oleksandr Gvozdyk	Atif Oberlton	Conor Wallace	Conor Wallace	Conor Wallace
8	Zach Parker	Craig Richards	David Morrell	Daniel Lapin	Imam Khataev	Jerome Pampellone	Mateusz Tryc
9	Anthony Yarde	Igor Mikhalkin	Willy Hutchinson	Lyndon Arthur	Willy Hutchinson	Willy Hutchinson	Diyab Simon Dabschah
10	Ali Izmailov	Ali Izmailov	Imam Khataev	Imam Khataev	Ben Whittaker	Dan Azeez	Willy Hutchinson

=== Super middleweight (168 lbs - 76.2 kg) ===
Rank	BoxRec	TBRB	The Ring	WBA	WBC	IBF	WBO
C	Canelo Álvarez	Terence Crawford	Terence Crawford	Jaime Munguia	Christian M'billi; Lester Martínez (I)	Osleys Iglesias	Hamzah Sheeraz
1	Hamzah Sheeraz	David Benavidez	David Benavidez	Bektemir Melikuziev	Hamzah Sheeraz	Jaime Munguía	Diego Pacheco
2	Christian M'billi	Christian M'billi	Christian M'billi	Jermall Charlo	Jaime Munguía	Vladimir Shishkin	Edgar Berlanga
3	Jermall Charlo	Caleb Plant	Caleb Plant	Lester Martínez	Jermall Charlo	Christian M'billi	Jaime Munguía
4	Jaime Munguía	David Morrell	David Morrell	Caleb Plant	Diego Pacheco	Edgar Berlanga	Paulinus Ndjolonimu
5	Osleys Iglesias	Jaime Munguía	Jaime Munguía	Edgar Berlanga	Luka Plantić	Diego Pacheco	Hamzah Sheeraz
6	Diego Pacheco	Carlos Góngora	Erik Bazinyan	Darius Fulghum	Osleys Iglesias	Kévin Lele Sadjo	Jacob Bank
7	Kévin Lele Sadjo	Pavel Silyagin	Vladimir Shishkin	Diego Pacheco	Lester Martinez	Jaime Munguía	Alem Begic
8	Callum Simpson	Evgeny Shvedenko	Diego Pacheco	Callum Simpson	Bektemir Melikuziev	Erik Bazinyan	Bruno Surace
9	Pavel Silyagin	Vladimir Shishkin	Edgar Berlanga	Bek Nurmaganbet	Callum Simpson	Simon Zachenhuber	Kévin Lele Sadjo
10	Luka Plantić	Edgar Berlanga	Osleys Iglesias	Junior Younan	Kévin Lele Sadjo	Petro Ivanov	Bektemir Melikuziev

=== Middleweight (160 lbs - 72.57 kg) ===
Rank	BoxRec	TBRB	The Ring	WBA	WBC	IBF	WBO
C	Janibek Alimkhanuly	vacant	vacant	Erislandy Lara	Carlos Adames; Jesus Ramos (I)	Aaron McKenna	Janibek Alimkhanuly; Denzel Bentley (I)
1	Erislandy Lara	Janibek Alimkhanuly	Janibek Alimkhanuly	Yoenlis Hernández	Meiirim Nursultanov	vacant	Hamzah Sheeraz
2	Chris Eubank Jr	Carlos Adames	Carlos Adames	Shane Mosley Jr	Yoenlis Hernández	vacant	Denzel Bentley
3	Carlos Adames	Erislandy Lara	Erislandy Lara	Connor Coyle	Chris Eubank Jr.	Andrei Mikhailovich	Shane Mosley Jr
4	Aaron McKenna	Chris Eubank Jr.	Chris Eubank Jr.	Ian Green	Bilal Jkitou	Hamzah Sheeraz	Andrei Mikhailovich
5	Austin Williams	Liam Smith	Meiirim Nursultanov	Denzel Bentley	Austin Williams	Chris Eubank Jr.	Brad Pauls
6	Michael Zerafa	Meiirim Nursultanov	Elijah Garcia	Chris Eubank Jr.	Etinosa Oliha	Shane Mosley Jr	Endry Saavedra
7	Etinosa Oliha	Anauel Ngamissengue	Hamzah Sheeraz	Austin Williams	Fiodor Czerkaszyn	Meiirim Nursultanov	Meiirim Nursultanov
8	Vadim Tukov	Elijah Garcia	Felix Cash	Michael Zerafa	Troy Isley	Etinosa Oliha	Fiodor Czerkaszyn
9	Anauel Ngamissengue	Austin Williams	Liam Smith	Vadim Tukov	Aaron McKenna	Kyrone Davis	Etoundi Michel William
10	Cesar Mateo Tapia	Hamzah Sheeraz	Austin Williams	Euri Cedeno	Shane Mosley Jr	Alexander Pavlov	Cesar Mateo Tapia

=== Super Welterweight (154 lbs - 69.85 kg) ===
Rank	BoxRec	TBRB	The Ring	WBA	WBC	IBF	WBO
C	Vergil Ortiz Jr.	Jermell Charlo	vacant	Jaron Ennis	Sebastian Fundora; Vergil Ortiz Jr. (I)	Josh Kelly	Jaron Ennis
1	Bakhram Murtazaliev	Brian Castaño	Tim Tszyu	vacant	Jaron Ennis	vacant	Tim Tszyu
2	Xander Zayas	Sebastian Fundora	Brian Castaño	Yoenis Tellez	Serhii Bohachuk	vacant	Liam Smith
3	Sebastian Fundora	Tim Tszyu	Sebastian Fundora	Erickson Lubin	Jesus Ramos	Erickson Lubin	Bakhram Murtazaliev
4	Keith Thurman	Tony Harrison	Magomed Kurbanov	Israil Madrimov	Bakary Samake	Tim Tszyu	Magomed Kurbanov
5	Israil Madrimov	Erickson Lubin	Liam Smith	Vito Mielnicki Jr.	Callum Walsh	Josh Kelly	Tony Harrison
6	Serhii Bohachuk	Israil Madrimov	Brian Mendoza	Magomed Kurbanov	Ermal Hadribeaj	Jesus Ramos	Brian Castaño
7	Erickson Lubin	Magomed Kurbanov	Erickson Lubin	Jesus Ramos	Israil Madrimov	Slawa Spomer	Carlos Ocampo
8	Jesus Ramos	Jesus Ramos	Israil Madrimov	Caoimhin Agyarko	Keith Thurman	Tewa Kiran	Troy Williamson
9	Uisma Lima	Liam Smith	Jesus Ramos	Jocksan Blanco	Uisma Lima	Callum Walsh	Jesus Ramos
10	Tim Tszyu	Bakhram Murtazaliev	Tony Harrison	Avzalbek Kuranbaev	Erickson Lubin	Jack Culcay	Erickson Lubin

=== Welterweight (147 lbs - 66.68 kg) ===
Rank	BoxRec	TBRB	The Ring	WBA	WBC	IBF	WBO
C	Devin Haney	Jaron Ennis	vacant	Teofimo Lopez; Jack Catterall (R)	Ryan Garcia	Liam Paro	Devin Haney
1	Richardson Hitchins	Errol Spence Jr.	Devin Haney	Shakhram Giyasov	Conor Benn	Paddy Donovan	Shakhram Giyasov[M]
2	Ryan Garcia	Terence Crawford	Brian Norman Jr.	Conor Benn	Raul Curiel	vacant	Jin Sasaki
3	Brian Norman Jr.	Yordenis Ugás	Jack Catterall	Lewis Crocker	Brian Norman Jr.	Richardson Hitchins	Karen Chukhadzhian
4	Liam Paro	Vergil Ortiz Jr.	Eimantas Stanionis	Jin Sasaki	Richardson Hitchins	Keyshawn Davis	Souleymane Cissokho
5	Arnold Barboza Jr.	Jaron Ennis	Teofimo Lopez	Paddy Donovan	Souleymane Cissokho	Lewis Crocker	David Papot
6	Teofimo Lopez	Keith Thurman	Ryan Garcia	Ricardo Salas RodRriguez	Arnold Barboza Jr.	Brian Norman Jr.	Derrieck Cuevas
7	Jack Catterall	Eimantas Stanionis	Rohan Polanco	Gabriel Maestre	Samuel Molina	Conah Walker	Conor Benn
8	Julian Rodriguez	Cody Crowley	Raul Curiel	Cletus Seldin	Rohan Polanco	Rohan Polanco	Giovani Santillan
9	Delante Johnson	Alexis Rocha	Alexis Rocha	Karen Chukhadzhian	Manny Pacquiao	Delante Johnson	Alexis Rocha
10	Rohan Polanco	Rashidi Ellis	Rolando Romero	Pat McCormack	Egidijus Kavaliauskas	David Papot	Owen Cooper

=== Super Lightweight (140 lbs - 63.5 kg) ===
Rank	BoxRec	TBRB	The Ring	WBA	WBC	IBF	WBO
C	Teofimo Lopez	Teofimo Lopez	Shakur Stevenson	Gary Antuanne Russell	Dalton Smith; Isaac Cruz (I)	vacant	Shakur Stevenson
1	Subriel Matías	Regis Prograis	Devin Haney	Andy Hiraoka	Sandor Martin	Liam Paro	Arnold Barboza Jr.
2	Andy Hiraoka	Jose Carlos Ramirez	Josh Taylor	Khariton Agrba	Gary Antuanne Russell	vacant	Richardson Hitchins
3	Richardson Hitchins	Arnold Barboza Jr.	Subriel Matías	Kenneth Sims Jr.	Dalton Smith	Jack Catterall	Jose Carlos Ramirez
4	Adam Azim	Jack Catterall	Jose Carlos Ramirez	Isaac Cruz	Richardson Hitchins	Regis Prograis	Sandor Martin
5	Dalton Smith	Jose Zepeda	Regis Prograis	Gary Antuanne Russell	Jack Catterall	Liam Paro	Josh Taylor
6	Arnold Barboza Jr.	Gary Antuanne Russell	Richardson Hitchins	Nestor Bravo	Jose Carlos Ramirez	Gustavo Daniel Lemos	Jack Catterall
7	Arthur Biyarslanov	Subriel Matías	Jack Catterall	Jack Catterall	Arnold Barboza Jr.	Arnold Barboza Jr.	Elvis Rodriguez
8	Alberto Puello	Steve Spark	Gary Antuanne Russell	Rolando Romero	Alberto Puello	Mathieu Germain	Regis Prograis
9	Gary Antuanne Russell	Teófimo López	Sandor Martin	Oscar Duarte Jurado	Steve Claggett	Jamaine Ortiz	Nestor Bravo
10	Lindolfo Delgado	Sandor Martin	Lindolfo Delgado	Kevin Hayler Brown	Lindolfo Delgado	Elvis Rodriguez	Steve Claggett

=== Lightweight (135 lbs - 61.23 kg) ===
Rank	BoxRec	TBRB	The Ring	WBA	WBC	IBF	WBO
C	vacant	vacant	vacant	Gervonta Davis	William Zepeda; Jadier Herrera (I)	Raymond Muratalla	Abdullah Mason
1	Gervonta Davis	Vasiliy Lomachenko	Gervonta Davis	vacant	Andy Cruz	vacant	vacant
2	Raymond Muratalla	Gervonta Davis	Vasiliy Lomachenko	Floyd Schofield	Tevin Farmer	Zaur Abdullaev	Raymond Muratalla
3	Keyshawn Davis	Ryan Garcia	Shakur Stevenson	Andy Cruz	Ricardo Nunez	Andy Cruz	Sam Noakes
4	William Zepeda	William Zepeda	William Zepeda	Edwin De Los Santos	Sam Noakes	Raymond Muratalla	Zaur Abdullaev
5	Abdullah Mason	Frank Martin	Keyshawn Davis	Maxi Hughes	Frank Martin	Mark Magsayo	Angel Fierro
6	Lamont Roach Jr.	Isaac Cruz	Denys Berinchyk	Fradimnil Macayo	Joe Cordina	Hinonori Mishiro	Isaac Cruz
7	Floyd Schofield	George Kambosos Jr	Raymond Muratalla	Lucas Bahdi	Artem Harutyunyan	Frank Martin	Josh Padley
8	Sam Noakes	Gustavo Daniel Lemos	Andy Cruz	Frank Martin	Jadier Herrera	Lucas Bahdi	Christopher Mouafo
9	Shu Utsuki	Jeremiah Nakathila	Frank Martin	Ruben Nestor Neri Munoz	Shu Utsuki	Sam Noakes	Sheriff Quaye
10	Zaur Abdullaev	Jamaine Ortiz	Tevin Farmer	Shuichiro Yoshino	Abdullah Mason	Josh Padley	Gabriel Flores Jr

=== Super featherweight (130 lbs - 58.97 kg) ===
Rank	BoxRec	TBRB	The Ring	WBA	WBC	IBF	WBO
C	—N/a	vacant	vacant	Anthony Cacace; Elnur Samedov (I)	O'Shaquie Foster; Ryan Garner (I)	Emanuel Navarrete	Emanuel Navarrete
1	Emanuel Navarrete	Óscar Valdez	Óscar Valdez	Otar Eranosyan	Robson Conceição	Eduardo Núñez	Archie Sharp
2	Robson Conceição	Héctor García	Héctor García	Elnue Samedov	Masanori Rikiishi	vacant	Óscar Valdez
3	Leigh Wood	Joe Cordina	Joe Cordina	Sultan Zaurbek	Eduardo Hernandez	Masanori Rikiishi	Albert Bell
4	Joe Cordina	Shavkat Rakhimov	O'Shaquie Foster	Hayato Tsutsumi	Abraham Nova	Kenichi Ogawa	Lamont Roach Jr.
5	Shavkat Rakhimov	O'Shaquie Foster	Shavkat Rakhimov	Mark Magsayo	Muhammadkhuja Yaqubov	Henry Lebron	Bryan Chevalier
6	Masanori Rikiishi	Roger Gutiérrez	Robson Conceição	Raymond Ford	Mark Magsayo	Charley Suarez	Liam Wilson
7	Elnur Samedov	Lamont Roach Jr.	Roger Gutiérrez	Zelfa Barrett	Leigh Wood	Shavkat Rakhimov	Henry Lebron
8	Anthony Cacace	Eduardo Ramirez	Kenichi Ogawa	Henry Lebron	Eduardo Núñez	Mark Magsayo	Eduardo Núñez
9	Henry Lebron	Robson Conceição	Lamont Roach Jr.	Eduardo Hernandez	Michael Magnesi	Anthony Cacace	Joe Cordina
10	Moussa Gholam	Kenichi Ogawa	Albert Bell	Yamato Hata	Jadier Herrera	Zelfa Barrett	Sultan Zaurbek

=== Featherweight (126 lbs - 57.15 kg) ===
Rank	BoxRec	TBRB	The Ring	WBA	WBC	IBF	WBO
C	—N/a	vacant	vacant	Brandon Figueroa	Bruce Carrington	Angelo Leo	Rafael Espinoza
1	Brandon Figueroa	Mauricio Lara	Luis Alberto Lopez	vacant	Ruben Villa	vacant	Arnold Khegai
2	Luis Alberto Lopez	Emanuel Navarrete	Leigh Wood	Bruce Carrington	Robeisy Ramírez	Lerato Dlamini	Sergio Chirino Sanchez
3	Leigh Wood	Rey Vargas	Rey Vargas	Mirco Cuello	Carlos Castro	Arnold Khegai	Robeisy Ramírez
4	Rafael Espinoza	Mark Magsayo	Nick Ball	Otabek Kholmatov	Nathaniel Collins	Tomoki Kameda	Bruce Carrington
5	Nick Ball	Gary Russell Jr.	Brandon Figueroa	Christian Olivo Barreda	Josh Warrington	Hector Andres Sosa	Ruben Villa
6	Robeisy Ramírez	Leigh Wood	Rafael Espinoza	Mikito Nakano	Joet Gonzalez	Jonathan Lopez	Brandon Leon Benitez
7	Raymond Ford	Luis Alberto Lopez	Raymond Ford	Edward Vazquez	Bruce Carrington	Reiya Abe	Luis Nery
8	Angelo Leo	Brandon Figueroa	Robeisy Ramírez	Dominique Jamar Francis	Angelo Leo	Brandon Leon Benitez	Stephen Fulton
9	Ruben Villa	Josh Warrington	Josh Warrington	Reiya Abe	Mauro Forte	Ruben Villa	Tomoki Kameda
10	Rey Vargas	Kiko Martinez	Ruben Villa	Carlos Gonzalez	Reiya Abe	Keisuke Matsumoto	Mauro Forte

=== Super bantamweight (122 lbs - 55.34 kg) ===
Rank	BoxRec	TBRB	The Ring	WBA	WBC	IBF	WBO
C	—N/a	Naoya Inoue	Naoya Inoue	Naoya Inoue; Victor Santillan (I)	Naoya Inoue	Naoya Inoue	Naoya Inoue
1	Naoya Inoue	Murodjon Akhmadaliev	Marlon Tapales	Ramon Cardenas	David Picasso	Sam Goodman	Sam Goodman
2	John Riel Casimero	Marlon Tapales	Murodjon Akhmadaliev	Gary Antonio Russell	Marlon Tapales	Vacant	Carl Jammes Martin
3	Sam Goodman	Sam Goodman	Luis Nery	Luis Nery	Luis Nery	Murodjon Akhmadaliev	Dennis McCann
4	Bryan Mercado Vazquez	Luis Nery	Sam Goodman	Subaru Murata	Murodjon Akhmadaliev	Carl Jammes Martin	Mukhammad Shekhov
5	David Picasso	Ramon Cardenas	David Picasso	Noel Reyes Cepeda	Liam Davies	Marlon Tapales	Elijah Pierce
6	Marlon Tapales	John Riel Casimero	Shabaz Masoud	Peter McGrail	Stephen Fulton	Liam Davies	Jerwin Ancajas
7	Murodjon Akhmadaliev	Elijah Pierce	TJ Doheny	Marlon Tapales	Sam Goodman	Toshiki Shimomachi	John Riel Casimero
8	Sebastian Hernandez Reyes	David Picasso	Elijah Pierce	Jerwin Ancajas	Chainoi Worawut	Ramon Cardenas	Ramon Cardenas
9	Toshiki Shimomachi	Shabaz Masoud	Ramon Cardenas	Mukhammad Shekhov	TJ Doheny	John Riel Casimero	Fillipus Nghitumbwa
10	Fillipus Nghitumbwa	Toshiki Shimomachi	Sebastian Hernandez Reyes	Toshiki Shimomachi	John Riel Casimero	TJ Doheny	David Picasso

=== Bantamweight (118 lbs - 53.52 kg) ===
Rank	BoxRec	TBRB	The Ring	WBA	WBC	IBF	WBO
C	—N/a	Vacant	Junto Nakatani	Jesse Rodriguez	Takuma Inoue	José Salas	Christian Medina
1	Junto Nakatani	Junto Nakatani	Vacant	vacant	Vincent Astrolabio	Vacant	Christian Medina Jimenez
2	Yoshiki Takei	Yoshiki Takei	Ryosuke Nishida	Tenshin Nasukawa	Petch Sor Chitpattana	Vacant	Tenshin Nasukawa
3	Seiya Tsutsumi	Ryosuke Nishida	Seiya Tsutsumi	Daigo Higa	Alejandro Santiago	Seiya Tsutsumi	Landile Ngxeke
4	Takuma Inoue	Seiya Tsutsumi	Yoshiki Takei	Takuma Inoue	Juan Martinez Ayala	Reymart Gaballo	Andrew Cain
5	Ryosuke Nishida	Daigo Higa	Takuma Inoue	Nonito Donaire	David Cuellar Contreras	Christian Medina Jimenez	Jeyvier Cintrón
6	David Cuellar Contreras	Tenshin Nasukawa	Daigo Higa	Victor Santillan	Jason Moloney	Srisaket Sor Rungvisai	Reymart Gaballo
7	Riku Masuda	Takuma Inoue	Tenshin Nasukawa	Riku Masuda	Emmanuel Rodríguez	Melvin Lopez	Yuttapong Tongdee
8	Tenshin Nasukawa	Jose Calderon Cervantes	Jason Moloney	Andrés Campos	Keita Kurihara	Dylan Price	Riku Masuda
9	Daigo Higa	Antonio Vargas	Jeyvier Cintrón	Andrey Bonilla	Daigo Higa	Daigo Higa	Vincent Astrolabio
10	Antonio Vargas	David Cuellar Contreras	Kenneth Llover	Lawrence Newton	Paul Butler	Keita Kurihara	Charlie Edwards

=== Super flyweight (115 lbs - 52.16 kg) ===
Rank	BoxRec	TBRB	The Ring	WBA	WBC	IBF	WBO
C	—N/a	Vacant	Vacant	David Jimenez	Vacant	Andrew Moloney	Vacant
1	Jesse Rodriguez	Fernando Martínez	Fernando Martínez	John Ramirez	Román González	Vacant	Román González
2	Fernando Martínez	Juan Francisco Estrada	Juan Francisco Estrada	Román González	Carlos Cuadras	Vacant	Kosei Tanaka
3	Ricardo Malajika	Phumelele Cafu	Kazuto Ioka	Ryusei Kawaura	Andrew Moloney	Vacant	Francisco Rodríguez Jr.
4	Juan Francisco Estrada	Kazuto Ioka	Phumelele Cafu	Kosei Tanaka	Kosei Tanaka	Rene Calixto Bibiano	Andrew Moloney
5	Suzumi Takayama	Carlos Cuadras	Kosei Tanaka	Elton Dharry	Jayr Raquinel	Argi Cortez	Ryusei Kawaura
6	Román González	Kosei Tanaka	Carlos Cuadras	Ari Bonilla	David Cuellar Contreras	Andrew Moloney	Joselito Velázquez
7	Kazuto Ioka	Andrew Moloney	Andrew Moloney	Israel González	Ricardo Malajika	Vince Paras	Suzumi Takayama
8	Phumelele Cafu	David Jiménez	David Jiménez	Andres Gregorio	Pedro Guevara	Román González	Israel González
9	David Jiménez	Willibaldo García	Pedro Guevara	Suzumi Takayama	Suzumi Takayama	Kosei Tanaka	Ross Mylet
10	Jayr Raquinel	Suzumi Takayama	Willibaldo García	Kenbun Torres	Argi Cortes	Jayr Raquinel	Jack Turner

=== Flyweight (112 lbs - 50.8 kg) ===
Rank	BoxRec	TBRB	The Ring	WBA	WBC	IBF	WBO
C	—N/a	vacant	vacant	Ricardo Sandoval; Abraham Perez (I)	Ricardo Sandoval; Galal Yafai (I)	Masamichi Yabuki	Anthony Olascuaga
1	Masamichi Yabuki	Ricardo Sandoval	Kenshiro Teraji	Yankiel Rivera	Seigo Yuri Akui	Felix Alvarado	Juan Carlos Camacho-Rivera
2	Ricardo Sandoval	Kenshiro Teraji	Seigo Yuri Akui	Angelino Cordova	vacant	vacant	Tobias Jeremias Reyes
3	Kenshiro Teraji	Masamichi Yabuki	Masamichi Yabuki	Kenshiro Teraji	Joselito Velázquez	Tobias Jeremias Reyes	Felix Alvarado
4	Anthony Olascuaga	Anthony Olascuaga	Galal Yafai	Seigo Yuri Akui	vacant	Taku Kuwahara	Yoali Mejia Mosqueda
5	Francisco Rodríguez Jr.	Ángel Ayala	Ricardo Sandoval	Jukiya Iimura	Ángel Ayala	Jukiya Iimura	Tomonori Nagao
6	Seigo Yuri Akui	Seigo Yuri Akui	Ángel Ayala	Artem Dalakian	Felix Alvarado	Ángel Ayala	Taku Kuwahara
7	Ángel Ayala	Felix Alvarado	Felix Alvarado	Thananchai Charunphak	Sergio Mendoza	Joselito Velázquez	Mark Vicelles
8	Felix Alvarado	Galal Yafai	Anthony Olascuaga	Taku Kuwahara	Thananchai Charunphak	Kento Hatanaka	Sergio Mendoza
9	Yoali Mejia Mosqueda	Sergio Mendoza	Tobias Jeremias Reyes	Samuel Carmona	Taku Kuwahara	Mark Vicelles	Jonathan González
10	Tobias Jeremias Reyes	Tobias Jeremias Reyes	Jukiya Iimura	Cristian Gonzalez Hernandez	Tobias Jeremias Reyes	Roderick Bautista	Mchanja Yohana

=== Light flyweight (108 lbs - 48.99 kg) ===
Rank	BoxRec	TBRB	The Ring	WBA	WBC	IBF	WBO
C	—N/a	Vacant	Vacant	René Santiago	Shokichi Iwata	Thanongsak Simsri	René Santiago
1	Kyosuke Takami	Knockout CP Freshmart	René Santiago	Vacant	Vacant	Vacant	Vince Paras
2	Thanongsak Simsri	Masamichi Yabuki	Thanongsak Simsri	Daiya Kira	Erik Badillo Mares	Vacant	Regie Suganob
3	Erik Badillo Mares	Thanongsak Simsri	Sivenathi Nontshinga	Shokichi Iwata	Shokichi Iwata	Jayson Vayson	Shokichi Iwata
4	Carlos Cañizales	Sivenathi Nontshinga	Shokichi Iwata	Rodrigo Ramirez	Yudai Shigeoka	Regie Suganob	Erik Badillo Mares
5	Regie Suganob	Kyosuke Takami	Carlos Cañizales	Erick Rosa	Junior Leandro Zarate	Sergio Mendoza	Daniel Valladares
6	Masataka Taniguchi	René Santiago	Regie Suganob	Sergio Mendoza	Gerardo Zapata	Mpumelelo Tshabalala	Jayson Vayson
7	Christian Araneta	Shokichi Iwata	Christian Araneta	Ronald Chacon	Jairo Noriega	Masataka Taniguchi	Christian Araneta
8	Sivenathi Nontshinga	Regie Suganob	Erick Rosa	Jesus Laya	Jayson Vayson	Sivenathi Nontshinga	Elwin Soto
9	René Santiago	Christian Araneta	Panya Pradabsri	Jairo Noriega	Mpumelelo Tshabalala	Junior Leandro Zarate	Junior Leandro Zarate
10	Shokichi Iwata	Panya Pradabsri	Kyosuke Takami	Gustavo Perez Alvarez	Yuga Ozaki	Christian Araneta	Jesse Espinas

=== Strawweight (105 lbs - 47.63 kg) ===
Rank	BoxRec	TBRB	The Ring	WBA	WBC	IBF	WBO
C	—N/a	vacant	Oscar Collazo	Oscar Collazo	Melvin Jerusalem	Pedro Taduran	Oscar Collazo
1	Oscar Collazo	Oscar Collazo	Melvin Jerusalem	Yuni Takada	Yudai Shigeoka	vacant	Vic Saludar
2	Melvin Jerusalem	Pedro Taduran	Pedro Taduran	Ryūsei Matsumoto	Thammanoon Niyomtrong	vacant	DianXing Zhu
3	DianXing Zhu	Melvin Jerusalem	Thammanoon Niyomtrong	Wilfredo Méndez	Siyakholwa Kuse	Dianxing Zhu	Ronald Chacon
4	Pedro Taduran	Thammanoon Niyomtrong	Ginjiro Shigeoka	Takeshi Ishii	Joey Canoy	Yudai Shigeoka	Wilfredo Méndez
5	Yudai Shigeoka	Yudai Shigeoka	Yudai Shigeoka	Thammanoon Niyomtrong	Pedro Taduran	Joey Canoy	Yuni Takada
6	Thammanoon Niyomtrong	Siyakholwa Kuse	Siyakholwa Kuse	Vic Saludar	Alex Winwood	Ginjiro Shigeoka	Masataka Taniguchi
7	Ryūsei Matsumoto	Alex Winwood	DianXing Zhu	Takero Kitano	Dianxing Zhu	Goki Kobayashi	Joey Canoy
8	Siyakholwa Kuse	Vic Saludar	Yuni Takada	Hasanboy Dusmatov	Goki Kobayashi	Jake Amparo	Samuel Salva
9	Joey Canoy	Joey Canoy	Joey Canoy	DianXing Zhu	Luis Castillo Soto	Alex Winwood	Ryūsei Matsumoto
10	Alex Winwood	Ryūsei Matsumoto	Ryūsei Matsumoto	Yudai Shigeoka	Daniel Valladares	Vic Saludar	Takeshi Ishii

== See also ==
- List of current world boxing champions
- List of current women boxing rankings
- List of current mixed martial arts champions
