= Carl Martin =

Carl Martin may refer to:

- Carl Martin (footballer)
- Carl Martin (musician)
- Carl Martin (politician)
- Carl Jammes Martin, Filipino boxer

== See also ==
- Karl Martin, German geologist
