= Lenar =

Lenar may refer to:

== People ==
=== Given name ===
- Lenar Fattakhov (born 2003), Russian footballer
- Lenar Gilmullin (1985–2007), Russian football full-back
- Lenar Perez (born 1998), Cuban boxer
- Lenar Safin (born 1969), Russian politician
- Lenar Whitney (born 1959), American businesswoman and politician

=== Surname ===
- Joseph Lenar, a commander in the Siege of Fort Harrison
- Piotr Lenar (born 1958), Polish cinematographer

== Other uses ==
- Lenar (company), company best known for the video game Deadly Towers
- Lenar Hoyt, character in the Hyperion Cantos
