= Jonatan Romero =

Colombian boxer (born 1986)

Jonathan Romero
Personal information
- Nickname: Momo
- Born: Jonathan Eccehomo Romero Preciado; December 14, 1986 (age 39) Cali, Colombia
- Height: 5 ft 8 in (173 cm)
- Weight: Super bantamweight; Featherweight

Boxing career
- Reach: 68 1/2 in (174 cm)
- Stance: Orthodox

Boxing record
- Total fights: 40
- Wins: 35
- Win by KO: 19
- Losses: 5
Medal record
Men's Amateur boxing
Representing Colombia
Central American and Caribbean Games
Bronze medal – third place	2006 Cartagena	Bantamweight

Jonatan Eccehomo Romero Preciado (born December 14, 1986, in Cali, Colombia) is a Colombian boxer best known to qualify for the Olympics 2008 at bantamweight. His name is sometimes spelled Jonathan or Jhonatan in press reports but not by the major Colombian media.

== Amateur career ==
Romero who is known by his nickname 'Momo' hails from a boxing family from the "El Retiro" neighbourhood of Santiago de Cali in the Valle del Cauca region. His older brother René, a national amateur champion himself, was shot in 2002.

Romero won bronze at the Boxing at the 2006 Central American and Caribbean Games where he lost his semifinal to Guillermo Rigondeaux by walkover but didn't participate in the 2007 PanAmerican games due to a shoulder injury.

At the 2007 World Amateur Boxing Championships he bested Chawazi Chatsygov, PanAm Games silver medalist Claudio Marrero 19:3 but lost to McJoe Arroyo 9:23. By reaching the quarterfinals he joined teammate Darley Perez in qualifying for Beijing 2008.

== Professional career ==
He won the IBF Super Bantamweight on February 16, 2013, against Alejandro Lopez to claim the vacant title.

He lost his title in an upset against Kiko Martinez on August 17, 2013, by TKO.

== Professional boxing record ==
40 fights	35 wins	5 losses
By knockout	19	4
By decision	16	1

No.	Result	Record	Opponent	Type	Round, time	Date	Location	Notes
40	Loss	35–5	Kenneth Sims Jr	RTD	5 (10)	2024-08-10	Michelob Ultra Arena, Paradise, Nevada, U.S.	
39	Loss	35–4	Manuel Jaimes	UD	8 (8)	2024-07-13	Centre Plaza, Modesto, California, U.S.	
38	Loss	35–3	Albert Bell	KO	1 (10)	2024-03-22	Glass City Center, Toledo, Ohio, U.S.	
37	Loss	35–2	Abraham Nova	KO	3 (10)	2023-07-28	Palms Casino Resort, Paradise, Nevada, U.S.	
36	Win	35–1	Jean Carlos Hernandez	UD	8 (8)	2022-05-20	Coliseo Bernardo Caraballo, Cartagena, Colombia	
35	Win	34–1	Saul Gutierrez Hernandez	UD	6 (6)	2021-10-02	Verite Social Venue, Monterrey, Mexico	
34	Win	33–1	Stiven Monterrosa	RTD	5 (8)	2020-12-11	Hotel Prado Mar, Puerto Colombia, Colombia	
33	Win	32–1	Luis Diaz Pestana	KO	3 (8)	2020-10-03	San Antonio de Palmito, Colombia	
32	Win	31–1	Mauricio Martinez	TKO	2 (8)	2018-04-14	Coliseo El Salitre, Bogotá, Colombia	
31	Win	30–1	Yohangel Romero	TKO	3 (8)	2018-03-17	Club Bavaria, Girardot, Colombia	
30	Win	29–1	Ruben Tamayo	UD	8 (8)	2016-03-11	Marconi Automative Museum, Tustin, California, U.S.	
29	Win	28–1	Arturo Badillo	TKO	4 (8)	2015-10-23	DoubleTree Hotel, Ontario, California, U.S.	
28	Win	27–1	Freddy Beleno	UD	10 (10)	2015-08-14	Coliseo Elias Chegwin, Barranquilla, Colombia	
27	Win	26–1	Alexander Espinoza	UD	10 (10)	2015-04-24	Coliseo Elias Chegwin, Barranquilla, Colombia	
26	Win	25–1	Gustavo Sandoval	TKO	4 (10)	2014-10-24	Coliseo Universidad del Norte, Barranquilla, Colombia	
25	Win	24–1	Julio Gómez	TKO	3 (8)	2014-09-19	Centro Recreacional Las Vegas, Barranquilla, Colombia	
24	Loss	23–1	Kiko Martínez	TKO	6 (12)	2013-08-17	Revel Resort, Atlantic City, New Jersey, U.S.	Lost IBF super-bantamweight title
23	Win	23–0	Alejandro López	SD	12 (12)	2013-02-16	Auditorio Municipal, Tijuana, Mexico	Won vacant IBF super-bantamweight title
22	Win	22–0	Efrain Esquivias Jr.	UD	12 (12)	2012-09-21	Chumash Casino Resort, Santa Ynez, California, U.S.	
21	Win	21–0	Adolfo Landeros	UD	8 (8)	2012-05-11	DoubleTree Hotel, Ontario, California, U.S.	
20	Win	20–0	Chris Avalos	SD	10 (10)	2011-12-02	Chumash Casino Resort, Santa Ynez, California, U.S.	
19	Win	19–0	Luis Zambrano	TKO	2 (8)	2011-10-27	Coliseo Elias Chegwin, Barranquilla, Colombia	
18	Win	18–0	Cecilio Santos	UD	6 (6)	2011-06-24	DoubleTree Hotel, Ontario, California, U.S.	
17	Win	17–0	Rufino Valdez	KO	1 (8)	2011-04-30	Coliseo Cubierto, Puerto Colombia, Colombia	
16	Win	16–0	Jean Javier Sotelo	UD	10 (10)	2011-03-25	Coliseo Bernardo Caraballo, Cartagena, Colombia	
15	Win	15–0	Mario Antonio Macias	UD	10 (10)	2011-02-05	Coliseo Bernardo Caraballo, Cartagena, Colombia	Won vacant WBO Latino super-bantamweight title
14	Win	14–0	Julio Gomez	TKO	2 (8)	2010-12-15	Centro Recreacional Las Vegas, Barranquilla, Colombia	
13	Win	13–0	Manuel Hernandez	KO	2 (10)	2010-11-17	Discoteka Trucupey, Barranquilla, Colombia	
12	Win	12–0	Rufino Valdez	KO	2 (10)	2010-08-27	Centro Recreacional Las Vegas, Barranquilla, Colombia	
11	Win	11–0	Jose Palma	UD	10 (10)	2010-06-25	Coliseo Cubierto, Puerto Colombia, Colombia	Won Colombian featherweight title
10	Win	10–0	Julio Gomez	KO	1 (8)	2010-06-04	Gimnasio Jorge Garcia Beltran, Barranquilla, Colombia	
9	Win	9–0	Jose Miguel Payares	UD	8 (8)	2010-04-16	Centro Recreacional Las Vegas, Barranquilla, Colombia	
8	Win	8–0	Daniel Romero	KO	1 (6)	2010-03-05	Estadio de Softbol, Puerto Colombia, Colombia	
7	Win	7–0	Hermin Isava	UD	8 (8)	2009-11-19	La Macarena, Medellín, Colombia	
6	Win	6–0	Jose Palacio	TKO	2 (6)	2009-10-23	Hotel Prado Mar, Puerto Colombia, Colombia	
5	Win	5–0	Jesus Lora	TKO	2 (6)	2009-09-11	Centro Recreacional Las Vegas, Barranquilla, Colombia	
4	Win	4–0	Manuel de los Reyes Herrera	UD	6 (6)	2009-07-17	Coliseo Miguel Lora, Montería, Colombia	
3	Win	3–0	Luis Correa	KO	1 (4)	2009-06-20	Coliseo Universidad del Norte, Barranquilla, Colombia	
2	Win	2–0	Rafael Salgado	TKO	2 (4)	2009-05-29	Centro Recreacional Las Vegas, Barranquilla, Colombia	
1	Win	1–0	Jhon Merino	KO	1 (4)	2009-05-15	Hotel Prado Mar, Puerto Colombia, Colombia	

== See also ==
- List of world super-bantamweight boxing champions

Sporting positions
Regional boxing titles
Preceded by José Palma	Colombian featherweight champion June 25, 2010 – 2011; Vacated	Vacant Title next held by Carlos Padilla
Vacant Title last held by Jonathan Oquendo	WBO Latino super-bantamweight champion February 5, 2011 – 2011; Vacated	Vacant Title next held by Jose Nieves
World boxing titles
Vacant Title last held by Nonito Donaire	IBF super-bantamweight champion February 16, 2013 – August 17, 2013	Succeeded by Kiko Martínez
