= Tibo Monabesa =

Indonesian boxer (born 1990)

Jesse Tibo Monabesa
Personal information
- Nickname: Ilduce
- Nationality: Indonesian
- Born: Tiburtius Besa; June 10, 1990 (age 36) Oelbubuk, South Central Timor, East Nusa Tenggara, Indonesia
- Height: 5 ft 4 in (163 cm)
- Weight: Light flyweight

Boxing career
- Reach: 67 in (170 cm)
- Stance: Southpaw

Boxing record
- Total fights: 26
- Wins: 21
- Win by KO: 8
- Losses: 2
- Draws: 2
- No contests: 1

Tibo Monabesa (born 10 June 1990) is an Indonesian professional boxer who has held the WBC International light-flyweight title since April 2021.

== Professional boxing career ==
Monabesa made his professional debut against Benigno Nino on May 16, 2012, and won the fight by decision. He amassed a 14–0–1 record during the next four years, with seven of those victories coming by way of stoppage.

Monabesa was scheduled to fight Rene Patilano for the vacant WBC International Silver light-flyweight title on January 21, 2017, at the Cendrawasih Sports Hall in Jakarta, Indonesia. Patilano was seen as a major step-up in competition, with BoxingScene describing him as "[Monabesa's] toughest test to date". Although he had a slow start to the bout, Monabesa began to take over as the fight went on and won the fight by unanimous decision. Two of the judges scored the fight 116–112 in his favor, while the third judge scored it 117–111 for Monabesa.

Monabesa made his first title defense against Arnold Garde on May 20, 2017, at the same venue in which he won the title. He retained his title by a fourth-round technical decision draw. Monabesa was scheduled to make his second WBC title defense against Lester Abutan on March 31, 2018, once again in the same venue. He retained the title by unanimous decision, with scores of 117–110, 119–108 and 117–109. Abutan was deducted a point in both the fourth and eight round for repeated low blows.

Monabesa was scheduled to face Lito Dante on August 4, 2018. He won the fight by a fifth-round technical decision, with scores of 39–37, 40–36 and 39–37. The fight was stopped after the fourth round, due to an accidental headbutt which left Monabesa cut. Monabesa was next scheduled to face the undefeated prospect Hiroto Kyoguchi on September 25, 2018. He suffered his first professional loss, as Kyoguchi won the fight by a fourth-round technical knockout.

Monabesa was scheduled to face Wittawas Basapean on March 29, 2019. He won the fight by unanimous decision, with two judges scoring the fight 98–92 for him, while the third judge scored it 99–91 for Monebesa. Monebesa was afterwards scheduled to face Omari Kimweri for the vacant WBO International light-flyweight title on July 7, 2019. He won the twelve round bout by unanimous decision, with scores of 118–110, 116–111 and 114–113.

Monebesa was scheduled to fight the one-time WBA minimumweight title-challenger Toto Landero for the vacant WBC International light-flyweight title on April 14, 2021, following a near two-year absence from the sport. He won the fight by unanimous decision. Monabesa was booked to make his first WBC International title defense against Jayson Vayson on 27 February 2022. Monabesa defeated Vayson in a controversial decision win as judges scores were 95–93, 95–93 and 94–94 in which he successfully defended his title. However the WBC declared the bout a no contest on 7 March 2022, stating: "Of the 10 judges who evaluated the match, they decided that Jayson Vayson won by a large difference".

== Professional boxing record ==
| 26 fights | 21 wins | 2 losses |
|---|---|---|
| By knockout | 8 | 2 |
| By decision | 13 | 0 |
| Draws | 2 | |
| No contests | 1 | |

| No. | Result | Record | Opponent | Type | Round, time | Date | Location | Notes |
|---|---|---|---|---|---|---|---|---|
| 26 | Loss | 21–2–2 (1) | Alex Winwood | TKO | 4 (10) | 3 Mar 2023 | Metro City, Northbridge, Australia | |
| 25 | NC | 21–1–2 (1) | Jayson Vayson | MD | 10 | 27 Feb 2022 | Holywings Club, Jakarta, Indonesia | WBC International light-flyweight title at stake; Originally an MD win for Monabesa, was later reviewed and was declared NC by the WBC. |
| 24 | Win | 21–1–2 | Toto Landero | UD | 12 | 14 Apr 2021 | Balai Sarbini Convention Hall, Jakarta, Indonesia | Won vacant WBC International light-flyweight title |
| 23 | Win | 20–1–2 | Omari Kimweri | UD | 12 | 7 Jul 2019 | Flobamora Sports Hall, Kupang, Indonesia | Won vacant WBO International light-flyweight title |
| 22 | Win | 19–1–2 | Wittawas Basapean | UD | 10 | 29 Mar 2019 | Balai Kota, Malang, Indonesia | |
| 21 | Loss | 18–1–2 | Hiroto Kyoguchi | TKO | 4 (10), 2:20 | 25 Sep 2018 | Korakuen Hall, Tokyo, Japan | |
| 20 | Win | 18–0–2 | Lito Dante | TD | 5 (10) | 4 Aug 2018 | Kepanjen, Malang, Indonesia | |
| 19 | Win | 17–0–2 | Lester Abutan | UD | 12 | 31 Mar 2018 | Cendrawasih Sports Hall, Jakarta, Indonesia | Retained WBC International Silver light-flyweight title |
| 18 | Win | 16–0–2 | Geboi Mansalayao | KO | 2 (10) | 30 Sep 2017 | The Breeze, Tangerang Selatan, Indonesia | |
| 17 | Draw | 15–0–2 | Arnold Garde | TD | 4 (12), 2:22 | 20 May 2017 | Cendrawasih Sports Hall, Jakarta, Indonesia | Retained WBC International Silver light-flyweight title |
| 16 | Win | 15–0–1 | Rene Patilano | UD | 12 | 12 Jan 2017 | Cendrawasih Sports Hall, Jakarta, Indonesia | Won vacant WBC International Silver light-flyweight title |
| 15 | Win | 14–0–1 | Joel Taduran | TKO | 6 (10) | 2 Sep 2016 | Balai Sarbini Convention Hall, Jakarta, Indonesia | |
| 14 | Win | 13–0–1 | Khachonsak Pothong | KO | 6 (10) | 30 Apr 2016 | Dimyati Sports Hall, Tangerang, Indonesia | |
| 13 | Win | 12–0–1 | Johan Wahyudi | TKO | 4 (10) | 31 Oct 2015 | Dimyati Sports Hall, Tondano, Indonesia | |
| 12 | Win | 11–0–1 | Ical Tobida | TKO | 4 (10) | 19 Sep 2015 | Ari Lasut Sports Hall, Manado, Indonesia | |
| 11 | Win | 10–0–1 | Samuel Tehuayo | PTS | 12 | 25 Jan 2015 | TVRI Studio, Jakarta, Indonesia | Won Indonesia Boxing Association light-flyweight title |
| 10 | Win | 9–0–1 | Boy Tanto | TKO | 2 (8) | 17 Dec 2014 | GOR Rawamangun Sports Hall, Jakarta, Indonesia | |
| 9 | Win | 8–0–1 | Jack Amisa | KO | 5 (12) | 30 Nov 2014 | TVRI Studio, Jakarta, Indonesia | Retained Indonesia Professional Boxing Commission light-flyweight title |
| 8 | Win | 7–0–1 | Ellias Nggenggo | UD | 12 | 8 Sep 2013 | TVRI Studio, Jakarta, Indonesia | Won Indonesia Professional Boxing Commission light-flyweight title |
| 7 | Win | 6–0–1 | Domi Nenokeba | UD | 12 | 25 May 2013 | TVRI Studio, Jakarta, Indonesia | Won interim Indonesia Boxing Association light-flyweight title |
| 6 | Win | 5–0–1 | Jack Amisa | MD | 6 | 9 May 2013 | Soldier Hall Marine Corps, Cilandak, Indonesia | |
| 5 | Win | 4–0–1 | Kichang Kim | TKO | 5 (8) | 23 Mar 2013 | TVRI Studio, Jakarta, Indonesia | |
| 4 | Draw | 3–0–1 | Domi Nenokeba | TD | 3 (6) | 2 Feb 2013 | TVRI Studio, Jakarta, Indonesia | |
| 3 | Win | 3–0 | Arbito Vretat | UD | 7 | 9 Sep 2012 | Indosiar Studio, Jakarta, Indonesia | |
| 2 | Win | 2–0 | Melianus Mirin | SD | 6 | 1 Aug 2012 | Indosiar Studio, Jakarta, Indonesia | |
| 1 | Win | 1–0 | Benigno Nino | PTS | 6 | 16 May 2012 | TVRI Studio, Jakarta, Indonesia | |
