= Kazuto Takesako =

Japanese boxer

Kazuto Takesako 竹迫和人
Personal information
- Nationality: Japanese
- Born: 15 July 1991 (age 35) Neyagawa, Osaka, Japan
- Height: 5 ft 9 1/2 in (177 cm)
- Weight: Middleweight

Boxing career
- Stance: Orthodox

Boxing record
- Total fights: 24
- Wins: 19
- Win by KO: 15
- Losses: 4
- Draws: 1

Kazuto Takesako (竹迫和人, Takesako Kazuto) (born Tsujito Takesako (竹迫司登, Takesako Tsujito); 15 July 1991) is a Japanese professional boxer who has held the WBC-OPBF middleweight title since January and the Japanese middleweight title since 2018.

== Professional career ==
Takesako made his professional debut on 14 July 2015, scoring a second-round technical knockout (TKO) victory over Tomoyuki Yokota at the Korakuen Hall in Tokyo, Japan.

After compiling a record of 7–0 (7 KOs) he defeated Hikaru Nishida by first-round TKO to capture the Japanese middleweight title on 3 March 2018 at the Culttz Kawasaki in Kawasaki, Japan.

After four more fights–three stoppage wins and a draw–he defeated Shinobu Charlie Hosokawa by twelve-round unanimous decision (UD) to capture the OPBF middleweight title. One judge scored the bout 120–108 while the other two scored it 119–109.

== Professional boxing record ==
| 24 fights | 19 wins | 4 losses |
|---|---|---|
| By knockout | 15 | 3 |
| By decision | 4 | 1 |
| Draws | 1 | |

| No. | Result | Record | Opponent | Type | Round, time | Date | Location | Notes |
|---|---|---|---|---|---|---|---|---|
| 24 | Loss | 19–4–1 | (Japan) Kazusa Kawabuchi | TKO | 7 (10), 0:20 | 16 Aug 2026 | Korakuen Hall, Tokyo, Japan Japan | Lost Japanese middleweight title; For vacant WBO Asia Pacific middleweight title |
| 23 | Win | 19–3–1 | (Japan) Mikio Sakai | UD | 10 | 12 Mar 2026 | Korakuen Hall, Tokyo, Japan Japan | Won vacant Japanese middleweight title |
| 22 | Win | 18–3–1 | (Japan) Shinobu Charlie Hosokawa | UD | 8 | 17 Sep 2025 | Korakuen Hall, Tokyo, Japan Japan | |
| 21 | Loss | 17–3–1 | (Japan) Riku Kunimoto | TKO | 1 (12), 2:39 | 15 Dec 2024 | Sumiyoshi Sports Center, Osaka, Japan | For WBO Asia Pacific middleweight title |
| 20 | Win | 17–2–1 | (England) Mark Dickinson | UD | 10 | 15 Jul 2024 | Yamato Arena, Suita, Japan | |
| 19 | Loss | 16–2–1 | (India) Tej Pratap Singh | SD | 12 | 11 May 2024 | Paradise City Plaza, Incheon, South Korea | Lost OPBF middleweight title |
| 18 | Win | 16–1–1 | (South Korea) Woo Hyun Ma | TKO | 10 (12), 0:53 | 7 Oct 2023 | Korakuen Hall, Tokyo, Japan | Won vacant OPBF middleweight title |
| 17 | Loss | 15–1–1 | (Kazakhstan) Meiirim Nursultanov | TKO | 8 (12), 2:33 | 15 Apr 2023 | Paradise City Plaza, Incheon, South Korea | For WBO International middleweight title |
| 16 | Win | 15–0–1 | (South Korea) Gyung Mo Yuh | TKO | 3 (12), 2:51 | 5 Nov 2022 | Korakuen Hall, Tokyo, Japan | Retained OPBF middleweight title |
| 15 | Win | 14–0–1 | (Thailand) Niwat Kongkan | KO | 3 (10), 1:57 | 3 Sep 2022 | Korakuen Hall, Tokyo, Japan | |
| 14 | Win | 13–0–1 | (Japan) Riku Kunimoto | KO | 1 (10), 2:46 | 19 May 2021 | Korakuen Hall, Tokyo, Japan | Retained Japanese middleweight title |
| 13 | Win | 12–0–1 | (Japan) Shinobu Charlie Hosokawa | UD | 12 | 18 Jan 2020 | Korakuen Hall, Tokyo, Japan | Won OPBF middleweight title |
| 12 | Win | 11–0–1 | (Japan) Shuji Kato | RTD | 8 (10), 3:00 | 3 Aug 2019 | Korakuen Hall, Tokyo, Japan | Retained Japanese middleweight title |
| 11 | Draw | 10–0–1 | (Japan) Shuji Kato | SD | 10 | 2 Mar 2019 | Korakuen Hall, Tokyo, Japan | Retained Japanese middleweight title |
| 10 | Win | 10–0 | (Japan) Sanosuke Sasake | TKO | 2 (10), 2:11 | 3 Nov 2018 | Korakuen Hall, Tokyo, Japan | Retained Japanese middleweight title |
| 9 | Win | 9–0 | (Thailand) Chaiwat Mueanphong | TKO | 7 (10), 2:44 | 2 Jun 2018 | Korakuen Hall, Tokyo, Japan | |
| 8 | Win | 8–0 | (Japan) Hikaru Nishida | TKO | 1 (10), 1:32 | 3 Mar 2018 | Culttz Kawasaki, Kawasaki, Japan | Won Japanese middleweight title |
| 7 | Win | 7–0 | (Japan) Shoma Fukumoto | TKO | 1 (8), 1:30 | 4 Nov 2017 | Korakuen Hall, Tokyo, Japan | |
| 6 | Win | 6–0 | (Thailand) Suwicha Ratidet | KO | 2 (8), 2:15 | 25 Apr 2017 | Korakuen Hall, Tokyo, Japan | |
| 5 | Win | 5–0 | (South Korea) Kyung Joon Ahn | TKO | 3 (8), 1:03 | 11 Nov 2016 | Korakuen Hall, Tokyo, Japan | |
| 4 | Win | 4–0 | (Japan) Hiroshi Ohashi | TKO | 3 (8), 0:09 | 13 Aug 2016 | City Culture Hall, Sōka, Japan | |
| 3 | Win | 3–0 | (Thailand) Sirisak Pimpasitta | KO | 1 (6), 1:27 | 22 Apr 2016 | Korakuen Hall, Tokyo, Japan | |
| 2 | Win | 2–0 | (Colombia) Elfelos Vega | TKO | 1 (5), 1:32 | 29 Sep 2015 | Korakuen Hall, Tokyo, Japan | |
| 1 | Win | 1–0 | (Japan) Tomoyuki Yokata | TKO | 2 (5), 2:55 | 14 Jul 2015 | Korakuen Hall, Tokyo, Japan | |
