= Albert Bell (boxer) =

American boxer (born 1993)

Personal information
- Nickname: Prince
- Born: Albert Laron Bell; January 21, 1993 (age 33) Toledo, Ohio, U.S.
- Height: 6 ft 0 in (183 cm)
- Weight: Super featherweight; Lightweight

Boxing career
- Reach: 73 in (185 cm)
- Stance: Orthodox

Boxing record
- Total fights: 30
- Wins: 28
- Win by KO: 9
- Losses: 1
- No contests: 1

Albert Laron Bell (born January 21, 1993), is an American professional boxer from Toledo, Ohio.

== Professional career ==
Bell made his professional debut on June 28, 2013.

=== Bell vs. Vélez ===
Bell knocked out Jayson Vélez in November 2023.

=== Bell vs. Romero ===
Bell knocked out former world champion Jonatan Romero in March 2024.

=== WBO Top Contender ===
Albert Bell was the number 1 ranked junior lightweight contender by the WBO from August 2023 to August 2024 and never received a title shot in that time. He requested to fight number 3 ranked Archie Sharp in November 2023 for an Interim belt. The request was denied by the WBO in January 2024. Stating that "Super Champion" Emanuel Navarrete was not required to fight any mandatory challengers until February 2025. "An interim championship and/or elimination bout is not warranted nor justified." Shortly after rejecting this fight, the WBO then skipped over Bell, and sanctioned the number 2 ranked Oscar Valdez to fight number 4 ranked Liam Wilson for the Interim belt. In September 2024 Bell was replaced as number 1 with Charly Suarez, and only 6 months later (March 2025) Albert Bell had dropped in the rankings all the way to 15th. Despite winning every fight.

WBO President Gustavo Olivieri [@OlivieriLaw] (December 23, 2024). "Mr. Bell must face rated opposition. Unfortunately, that has not been the case" (Tweet) – via X (formerly Twitter).

=== IBF Title Eliminator ===
Bell moved up to lightweight and won both his fights in 2025. In February 2026, the IBF ordered a world title eliminator for Albert Bell to fight Lucas Bahdi. The winner would fight champion Raymond Muratalla. Bell accepted, Bahdi did not, and days later the IBF ordered Bell against Andy Cruz.

=== WBO lightweight title challenge ===
Bell challenged WBO lightweight champion Abdullah Mason at Rocket Arena in Cleveland, Ohio, on July 4, 2026, having been drafted in as a replacement for Joe Cordina who was denied a visa to enter the United States. He lost by stoppage in the 12th and final round after being knocked to the canvas twice before the referee stepped in and halted the fight.

== Professional boxing record ==
| 30 fights | 28 wins | 1 loss |
|---|---|---|
| By knockout | 9 | 1 |
| By decision | 19 | 0 |
| No contests | 1 | |

| No. | Result | Record | Opponent | Type | Round, time | Date | Location | Notes |
|---|---|---|---|---|---|---|---|---|
| 30 | Loss | 28–1 (1) | Abdullah Mason | TKO | 12 (12), 0:45 | Jul 4, 2026 | Wolstein Center, Cleveland, Ohio, U.S. | For WBO lightweight title |
| 29 | Win | 28–0 (1) | Keith Hunter | UD | 10 | Aug 30, 2025 | Huntington Center, Toledo, Ohio, U.S. | Won vacant IBF and NABA lightweight titles |
| 28 | Win | 27–0 (1) | Josec Ruiz | UD | 10 | Apr 12, 2025 | Huntington Center, Toledo, Ohio, U.S. | |
| 27 | Win | 26–0 (1) | Jonatan Romero | KO | 1 (10), 2:20 | Mar 22, 2024 | Glass City Center, Toledo, Ohio, U.S. | |
| 26 | Win | 25–0 (1) | Jayson Vélez | TKO | 2 (10) | Nov 11, 2023 | Glass City Center, Toledo, Ohio, U.S. | |
| 25 | Win | 24–0 (1) | Presco Carcosia | RTD | 5 (8), 3:00 | Aug 11, 2023 | Overtime Elite Arena, Atlanta, Georgia, U.S. | |
| 24 | Win | 23–0 (1) | William Encarnación | UD | 10 | May 13, 2023 | Seagate Convention Center, Toledo, Ohio, U.S. | Retained NABO super-featherweight title |
| 23 | Win | 22–0 (1) | Nicolas Polanco | UD | 10 | Sep 3, 2022 | Huntington Center, Toledo, Ohio, U.S. | Won vacant NABO super-featherweight title |
| 22 | Win | 21–0 (1) | Martin Diaz | UD | 8 | Apr 15, 2022 | Seagate Convention Center, Toledo, Ohio, U.S. | |
| 21 | Win | 20–0 (1) | Daulis Prescott | TKO | 1 (8), 1:09 | Feb 26, 2022 | International Convention Center, College Park, Georgia, U.S. | |
| 20 | Win | 19–0 (1) | Julio Cortez | UD | 8 | Aug 14, 2021 | Hard Rock Hotel & Casino, Tulsa, Oklahoma, U.S. | |
| 19 | Win | 18–0 (1) | Manuel Rey Rojas | UD | 8 | Apr 10, 2021 | Osage Casino, Tulsa, Oklahoma, U.S. | |
| 18 | Win | 17–0 (1) | Mark Bernaldez | UD | 10 | Jul 2, 2020 | MGM Grand, Paradise, Nevada, U.S. | |
| 17 | Win | 16–0 (1) | Frank De Alba | UD | 8 | Oct 26, 2019 | Sparks Convention Center, Reno, Nevada, U.S. | |
| 16 | Win | 15–0 (1) | Andy Vences | UD | 10 | Jun 15, 2019 | MGM Grand Garden Arena, Paradise, Nevada, U.S. | Won WBC Continental Americas super-featherweight title |
| 15 | Win | 14–0 (1) | Edward Kakembo | UD | 6 | Feb 15, 2019 | Grand Casino, Hinckley, Minnesota, U.S. | |
| 14 | Win | 13–0 (1) | Carlos Padilla | RTD | 6 (8), 3:00 | Nov 16, 2018 | Chesapeake Energy Arena, Oklahoma City, Oklahoma, U.S. | |
| 13 | Win | 12–0 (1) | Orlando Rizo | KO | 1 (6), 0:32 | Sep 1, 2018 | Seagate Convention Center, Toledo, Ohio, U.S. | |
| 12 | Win | 11–0 (1) | Orlando Rizo | UD | 6 | Jun 2, 2018 | World Congress Center, Atlanta, Georgia, U.S. | |
| 11 | Win | 10–0 (1) | Ricardo Maldonado | UD | 8 | Mar 10, 2018 | Seagate Convention Center, Toledo, Ohio, U.S. | |
| 10 | Win | 9–0 (1) | Charles Mulindwa | TKO | 1 (6), 1:09 | Nov 4, 2017 | Seagate Convention Center, Toledo, Ohio, U.S. | |
| 9 | Win | 8–0 (1) | Tyrome Jones | UD | 6 | Sep 2, 2017 | Seagate Convention Center, Toledo, Ohio, U.S. | |
| 8 | Win | 7–0 (1) | Justin Savi | UD | 4 | Apr 8, 2017 | St. Clement's Hall, Toledo, Ohio, U.S. | |
| 7 | NC | 6–0 (1) | Andrew Rodgers | NC | 4 | Feb 10, 2017 | Huntington Center, Toledo, Ohio, U.S. | |
| 6 | Win | 6–0 | Scott Furney | TKO | 2 (4), 1:01 | Aug 28, 2015 | DeCarlo’s Convention Center, Detroit, Michigan, U.S. | |
| 5 | Win | 5–0 | Josh Ross | UD | 4 | Jul 10, 2014 | American Airlines Arena, Miami, Florida, U.S. | |
| 4 | Win | 4–0 | Micah Branch | UD | 4 | Apr 18, 2014 | Convention Center, Monroeville, Pennsylvania, U.S. | |
| 3 | Win | 3–0 | Angel Hernandez | UD | 4 | Nov 26, 2013 | BB&t Center, Sunrise, Florida, U.S. | |
| 2 | Win | 2–0 | Angel Albelo | UD | 4 | Sep 20, 2013 | Civic Center, Kissimmee, Florida, U.S. | |
| 1 | Win | 1–0 | Harold Torres | TKO | 4 (4), 0:46 | Jun 28, 2013 | Civic Center, Kissimmee, Florida, U.S. | |

== See also ==
- List of male boxers

Sporting positions
Amateur boxing titles
| Previous: Erick De Leon | Golden Gloves lightweight champion 2012 | Next: Lamont Roach Jr. |
Regional boxing titles
| Preceded by Andy Vences | WBC Continental Americas super-featherweight champion June 15, 2019 – 2020; Vacated | Vacant Title next held by Pablo Vicente |
| Vacant Title last held by Lamont Roach Jr. | NABO super-featherweight champion September 3, 2022 – 2024; Vacated | Vacant Title next held by Andres Cortes |
| Vacant Title last held by Andy Cruz | IBF International lightweight champion August 30, 2025 – 2025; Vacated | Vacant |
| Vacant Title last held by Roger Gutiérrez | NABA lightweight champion August 30, 2025 – 2025; Vacated | Vacant |
