= Ali Izmailov =

Cuban boxer (born 1993)

Personal information
- Born: Али Зебейрович Измайлов; 4 April 1993 (age 33) Malgobek, Russia
- Height: 5 ft 11 in (1.80 m)
- Weight: Light heavyweight

Boxing career
- Stance: Orthodox

Boxing record
- Total fights: 15
- Wins: 15
- Win by KO: 10
- Losses: 0

Ali Izmailov (born 4 April 1993) is a Russian professional boxer. He competes in the light-heavyweight division, where he held WBC Eurasia & IBF–USBA light-heavyweight titles.

== Izmailov vs Fayfer ==
In his sixth professional bout, Izmailov took on the very experienced Ruslan Fayfer. Despite being predicted to struggle, Izmailov dominated the fight from start to finish. After a big round seven where Fayfer was rocked multiple times, Izmailov finished him off in the ninth round. He staggered Fayfer, causing the referee to jump in and wave it off.

== Izmailov vs Foster ==
Izmailov faced unbeaten American Charles Foster for the IBF–USBA light-heavyweight title. Despite being a big favourite with a high knockout ratio, Izmailov failed to get the stoppage, though he did manage to drop the American in the fifth round. Izmailov won by unanimous decision, capturing the vacant regional title. After the fight, Izmailov accused Foster of excessive holding

Izmailov's next fight is scheduled for February 28, 2025 against Habib Ahmed in his native Russia. It will be his first time fighting in Russia since 2019.

== Professional boxing record ==
| 15 fights | 15 wins | 0 losses |
|---|---|---|
| By knockout | 10 | 0 |
| By decision | 5 | 0 |

| No. | Result | Record | Opponent | Type | Round, time | Date | Location | Notes |
|---|---|---|---|---|---|---|---|---|
| 15 | Win | 15–0 | Frenk Shagembe | TKO | 7 (10), 2:20 | 29 May 2026 | Tashkent, Uzbekistan | Won WBC Eurasia light-heavyweight title |
| 14 | Win | 14–0 | Meysam Gheshlaghi | UD | 10 | 06 Nov 2025 | Samara, Russia | |
| 13 | Win | 13–0 | Habib Ahmed | TKO | 2 (10), 2:58 | 27 Feb 2025 | USC Soviet Wings, Moscow, Russia | |
| 12 | Win | 12–0 | Britton Norwood | TKO | 4 (10), 1:28 | 20 Feb 2024 | Wayne State Fieldhouse, Detroit, Michigan, US | Retained IBF–USBA light-heavyweight title |
| 11 | Win | 11–0 | Charles Foster | UD | 10 | 9 Jun 2023 | Turning Stone Resort and Casino, Verona, New York US | Won vacant IBF–USBA light-heavyweight title |
| 10 | Win | 10–0 | Marcelo Ruben Molina | KO | 1 (8), 1:55 | 11 Mar 2023 | Mass Mutual Center, Springfield, Massachusetts, US | |
| 9 | Win | 9–0 | Eric Murguia | UD | 10 | 10 Aug 2022 | Garden Theater, Detroit, Michigan, US | Won vacant IBF–USBA light-heavyweight title |
| 8 | Win | 8–0 | Abraham Tebes | RTD | 3 (10), 3:00 | 2 Apr 2022 | Ford Community Center, Dearborn, Michigan, US | |
| 7 | Win | 7–0 | Israel Duffus | TKO | 4 (10), 0:34 | 7 Jan 2022 | Caribe Royal Casino, Orlando, Florida, US | |
| 6 | Win | 6-0 | James Ballard | TKO | 2 (8), 1:21 | 16 Oct 2021 | Performance Arts Center, Dearborn, Michigan, US | |
| 5 | Win | 5–0 | Ruslan Fayfer | TKO | 9 (10), 2:42 | 20 Nov 2020 | Falcon Cluc, Minsk, Belarus | |
| 4 | Win | 4–0 | Yevgenii Makhteienko | TK0 | 5 (8), 2:33 | 4 Aug 2020 | DiaMond, Minsk, Belarus | |
| 3 | Win | 3–0 | Sergei Ekimov | UD | 8 | 12 Mar 2020 | Pyramide, Kazan, Russia | |
| 2 | Win | 2–0 | Dmitry Sukhotskiy | UD | 6 | 12 Oct 2019 | Arena Riga, Riga, Latvia | |
| 1 | Win | 1–0 | Varazdat Chernikov | TKO | 2 (4), 1:49 | 20 Aug 2019 | Boxing and Gym academy, Moscow, Russia | |
