= Alex Winwood =

Australian boxer (born 1997)

Personal information
- Nationality: Australian
- Born: 25 June 1997 (age 28); Bunbury, Australia

Sport
- Sport: Boxing

Alex Winwood (born 25 June 1997) is an Australian professional boxer and Olympian, notable for being the first Noongar fighter to contest for a world title. He began boxing at a young age and achieved significant success in amateur competitions, including six National Championships wins and participation in two World Championships, the 2020 Tokyo Olympics and 2022 Birmingham Commonwealth games Games.

In 2022, Winwood turned professional, winning the WBC international title in both the lightweight and straw-weight categories. On September 7, 2024, he fought for the world title in the featherweight division against an eight-time world champion in Perth, showcasing resilience despite losing the closely contested match.

== Early years ==
Winwood is a Noongar man from Mandurah in Perth. He started boxing as a 15-year-old in high school and he loved it. He started training outside of school at the Eureka Boxing Club in Mandurah, where he was coached by Brian Satori.

Winwood is the great-nephew of former professional Brian Bennell.

== Achievements ==
Winwood participated in the AIBA World Boxing Championships. He won the national flyweight title in December 2019.

Winwood did not qualify for the 2016 Rio Olympics. He then earned his Olympic spot at the 2020 Asia and Oceania Olympic Qualification event in Amman, Jordan. He came into the final round a point behind his Iranian opponent, Omid Ahmadi Safa, but walked away with a victory and qualification for his Olympic debut at Tokyo 2020.

He was awarded the Sportsperson of the Year Award at the 2024 NAIDOC Awards.

== Professional career ==
=== Early years ===
Winwood made his debut against Stinky Mario Bunda and they competed for the vacant West Australian light flyweight title, Winwood stopped Bunda in the 2nd round of their match.

In just his second bout, Winwood won the vacant WBC International junior flyweight belt against former IBO world champion, Tibo Monabesa, moreover he took the WBC International strawweight title against Nicaraguan Reyneris Gutierrez, just after the victory against Monabesa, he later defends the title against Filipino, Criz Ganoza and defeated Ganoza via unanimous decision, Winwood would become the top contender of the World Boxing Council in the strawweight division and Winwood is very close on getting the fight against Yudai Shigeoka for the World title, as Winwood's goal is to become the fastest Australian to reach the world championship.

== Professional boxing record ==
| 5 fights | 4 wins | 1 loss |
|---|---|---|
| By knockout | 2 | 0 |
| By decision | 2 | 1 |

| No. | Result | Record | Opponent | Type | Round, Time | Date | Location | Notes |
|---|---|---|---|---|---|---|---|---|
| 5 | Loss | 4–1 | Knockout CP Freshmart | MD | 12 | Sep 7, 2024 | HBF Stadium, Mount Claremont, Australia | For WBA (Super) mini-flyweight title |
| 4 | Win | 4–0 | Cris Ganoza | UD | 10 | Dec 1, 2023 | Metro City, Northbridge, Western Australia, Australia | Retained WBC International strawweight title |
| 3 | Win | 3–0 | Reyneris Gutierrez | UD | 10 | Jun 16, 2023 | Metro City, Northbridge, Western Australia, Australia | Won WBC International strawweight title |
| 2 | Win | 2–0 | Tibo Monabesa | TKO | 4 (10), 1:16 | Mar 3, 2023 | Metro City, Northbridge, Western Australia, Australia | Won vacant WBC International light flyweight title |
| 1 | Win | 1–0 | Stinky Mario Bunda | TKO | 2 (6) | Nov 25, 2022 | Metro City, Northbridge, Western Australia, Australia | Won vacant West Australian light flyweight title |
