= Henry Lebron =

Puerto Rican boxer (born 1997)

Henry Lebron-Gonzalez
Personal information
- Nickname: Moncho
- Born: 15 September 1997 (age 28) Moca, Puerto Rico
- Height: 5 ft 6 in (1.68 m)
- Weight: super featherweight

Boxing career
- Stance: Southpaw

Boxing record
- Total fights: 20
- Wins: 20
- Win by KO: 10
- Losses: 0

Henry Lebron (born 15 September 1997) is a Puerto Rican professional boxer. He currently competes in the super featherweight division.

== Amateur career ==
Lebron had a very successful amateur career winning the Puerto Rico National Championships from 2013 to 2016. He has notable victories over Elvis Rodriguez and Carlos Balderas. He turned pro with a record of 153-7.

== Professional career ==
=== Lebron vs Foster III ===
On the undercard of Efe Ajagba vs Joseph Goodall, Lebron faced his toughest fight of his career yet against unbeaten American William Foster III. Lebron ended up getting the win, outlanding Foster throughout. Foster did well during the middle rounds but Lebron finished strong, hurting Foster in the ninth round.

=== Lebron vs Diaz ===
Lebron achieved the biggest win of his career against two time world title challenger Christopher Diaz in their native Puerto Rico. While outboxing Diaz for the majority of the fight Lebron had to overcome adversity in the final round. He got caught and was dazed but managed to hold out for the win.
