= Abdullah Mason =

American professional boxer (born 2004)

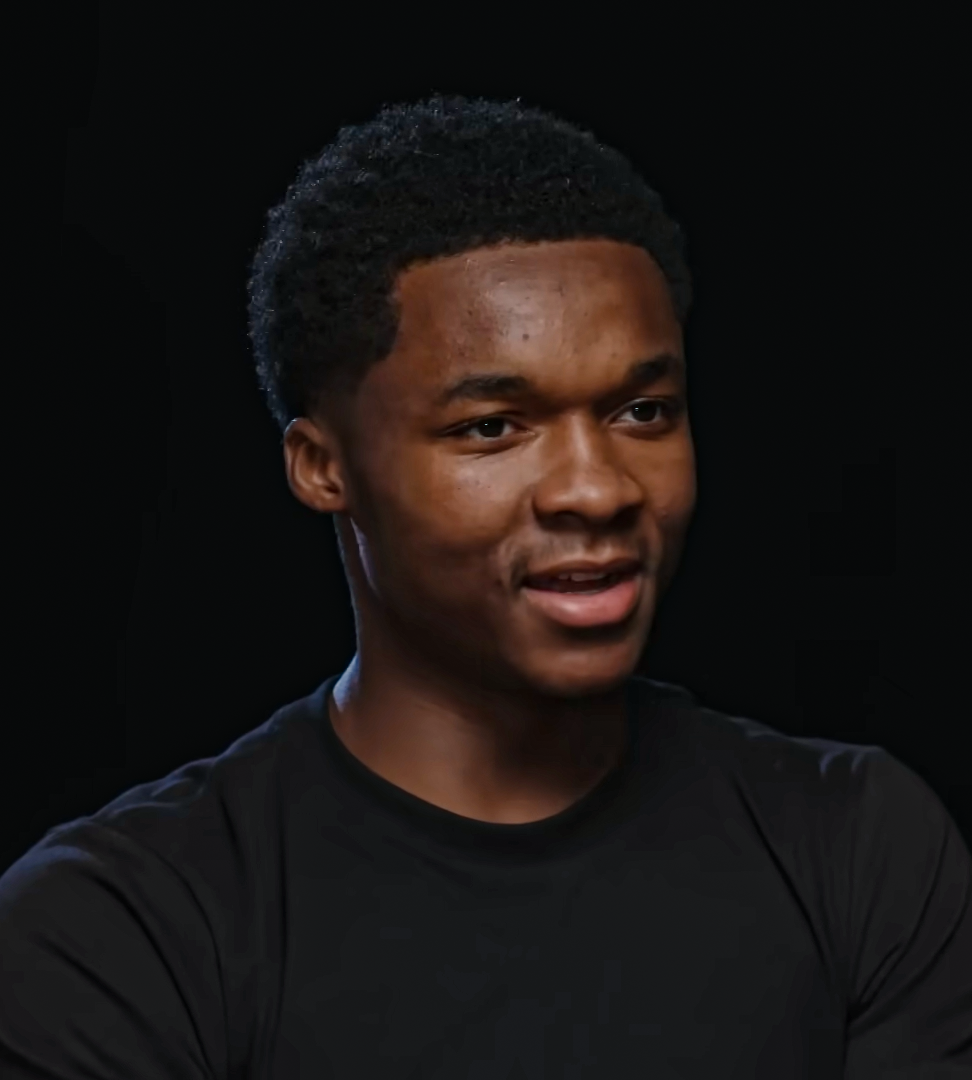

Personal information
- Born: April 5, 2004 (age 22) Bedford, Ohio, U.S.
- Height: 5 ft 9 in (175 cm)
- Weight: Lightweight

Boxing career
- Reach: 74 in (188 cm)
- Stance: Southpaw

Boxing record
- Total fights: 21
- Wins: 21
- Win by KO: 18
- Losses: 0
- Draws: 0
- No contests: 0

Abdullah Mason (born April 5, 2004) is an American professional boxer. He has held the WBO lightweight title since November 2025. As an amateur, Mason won the National Junior Championships in 2017, the Eastern Regional Open in 2017 and 2018, and the USA Boxing Youth National Title in 2021.

Considered one of the top "Prospects of the Year" in 2025 in the world, he is known for his speed, power, athleticism, and composure in the ring, which recently led to him becoming the youngest male world champion in boxing at the age of 21.

== Early life ==
Abdullah Mason was born on April 5, 2004, in Bedford, Ohio, U.S., and was raised in Cleveland. He is part of a large family of boxers, with four of his five brothers also having competed: Amir, Adel, Abdur-Rahman, and Ibrahim. His family, who are practicing Muslims, lived overseas in Yemen and Egypt for a period before returning to a neighborhood in Cleveland that had a local boxing gym. His father, Valiant Mason, who had previously trained his older sons in various martial arts like karate and jiu-jitsu, asked his sons "who was interested in boxing?" Abdullah was the first to express a keen interest and began training at the age of nine. His brothers subsequently joined him in the sport, all training under the tutelage of their father.

Mason developed his skills at the Little Giants Gym in Euclid, Ohio, often training in a dedicated space in his family's basement.

== Amateur career ==
Abdullah won the National Junior Championships in 2017, the Eastern Regional Open in 2017 and 2018, the Junior Open in 2018 and 2019 and the USA Boxing Youth National Title in 2021. He finished with a record of 65–15.

== Professional career ==
=== Early career ===
Mason signed with the promotional company Top Rank when he turned pro. He made his debut on the undercard of Mikaela Mayer vs Maïva Hamadouche in Las Vegas, where he stopped his opponent Jaylan Phillips in the second round following a barrage of punches and the referee jumped in. Mason's second fight took place at the MGM Grand Garden Arena on the undercard of Oscar Valdez vs Shakur Stevenson, where he knocked out Argentine Luciano Ramos in the first round.

Mason later fought on the undercard of Devin Haney vs. Vasiliy Lomachenko against American Desmond Lyons, where he scored a knockout victory in the sixth round. Now with a record of 10–0, Mason made his T-Mobile Arena debut on the undercard of Shakur Stevenson vs Edwin De Los Santos, where he scored another knockout victory against the Argentine Jose Cardenas in the second round.

Mason was scheduled to face Giovanni Cabrera in Las Vegas on April 5, 2025. On March 21, 2025, it was reported that Cabrera withdrew due to injury, and was replaced by Carlos Ornelas. Fighting on his 21st birthday, he scored a sixth-round stoppage victory over Ornelas, improving his record to 18–0 and winning the vacant NABF and NABO lightweight titles.

=== WBO lightweight champion ===
In his first world title fight, Mason faced fellow unbeaten boxer, Sam Noakes, for the vacant WBO lightweight championship at the ANB Arena in Riyadh, Saudi Arabia, on November 22, 2025. He won via unanimous decision with the judges scorecards reading 115–113, 115–113 and 117–111 and improving to 20–0. The victory made Mason the youngest active male world champion at 21 years old.

On April 6, 2026, it was announced that Mason would make a first defence of his WBO title against The Ring No. 10 ranked former champion Joe Cordina (18–1, 9 KOs) on 4 July at Rocket Arena in Cleveland, Ohio, live on DAZN. This would mark his first professional fight in his hometown. On June 24, 2026, the fight was cancelled after Cordina was denied a visa to enter the United States. 33-year-old Albert Bell (28–0, 9 KOs) was brought in as a replacement opponent. Bell was originally scheduled to fight on July 18 in an IBF lightweight eliminator against Andy Cruz. Mason weighed at the 135 pound limit and Bell weighed 134.9 pounds.

Mason retained his WBO title by stopping Bell in what was described as a competitive bout that ended in controversy over the referee's stoppage. Mason started off by targeting Bell's body, while Bell countered effectively, making the early rounds closely contested. In the second round, a clash of heads caused a cut above Mason’s eye, which affected the pace of the fight early on. Bell gave Mason one of the toughest tests of his career, landing solid punches throughout the bout. Despite Bell’s counterattacks and forward pressure, Mason adjusted his strategy and gradually wore him down. Mason came out quick from his corner to start the last round, believing he was down on the cards. He dropped Bell twice with left hooks. Following the second knockdown, referee Mark Nelson stepped in and waved the fight off at the 0:45 mark. Through the first six rounds, Bell outlanded Mason 56 to 38 in shots landed. Overall, Mason landed 201 of 482 punches thrown (42%) and Bell landed 167 of 398 (42%). After the fight, Bell revealed that a clean punch completely changed the fight: "He caught me in the nose. I couldn't breathe. I think he probably fractured my nose... after that it was just pretty much trying to get by." He admitted he was frustrated about not being allowed to finish the fight. Mason admitted his corner used a mental trick to fire him up. "He told me I was down on the cards. I wasn’t down, but naturally, he wanted to make sure I got out there and got the job done... So I was like, ‘Okay bet, let me get him out of here" According on Nielsen Media Research, the broadcast across TNT, DAZN, and truTV peaked at 820,000 viewers and averaged 661,000 viewers. TNT stated that wider event coverage, including the press conference, weigh-in and pre- and post-fight programming, reached “more than 3.2 million viewers” across the three platforms.

The ending caused controversy, with commentators and fighters like Devin Haney labelling it a premature or poor stoppage, as Bell wanted to finish on his feet. However, the official judges' scorecards showed that Mason was ahead at the time of the stoppage (106–103, 107–102, 107–102), which meant he had already secured the win via the scorecards. The controversy around the stoppage continued in media outlets and among boxing fans, fuelling debates on officiating standards and fight safety.

== Personal life ==
Abdullah is a practicing Muslim and is open about his faith, often using the phrase "Alhamdulillah" (praise be to God) in interviews and social media posts. This commitment extends to his professional life, as he has trained and competed while fasting during the holy month of Ramadan.

== Professional boxing record ==
21 fights	21 wins	0 losses
By knockout	18	0
By decision	3	0

No.	Result	Record	Opponent	Type	Round, time	Date	Location	Notes
21	Win	21–0	Albert Bell	TKO	12 (12), 0:45	Jul 4, 2026	Wolstein Center, Cleveland, Ohio, U.S.	Retained WBO lightweight title
20	Win	20–0	Sam Noakes	UD	12	Nov 22, 2025	anb Arena, Riyadh, Saudi Arabia	Won vacant WBO lightweight title
19	Win	19–0	Jeremia Nakathila	RTD	5 (10), 0:01	Jun 7, 2025	Norfolk Scope, Norfolk, Virginia, U.S.	Retained NABF and NABO lightweight titles
18	Win	18–0	Carlos Ornelas	TKO	6 (10), 3:00	Apr 5, 2025	Palms Casino Resort, Paradise, Nevada, U.S.	Won vacant NABF and NABO lightweight titles
17	Win	17–0	Manuel Jaimes	TKO	4 (8), 1:55	Feb 14, 2025	The Theater at Madison Square Garden, New York City, New York, U.S.	
16	Win	16–0	Yohan Vasquez	TKO	2 (8), 1:59	Nov 8, 2024	Norfolk Scope, Norfolk, Virginia, U.S.	
15	Win	15–0	Mike Ohan Jr.	TKO	2 (8), 0:40	Aug 17, 2024	Videotron Centre, Quebec City, Canada	
14	Win	14–0	Luis Lebrón	TKO	3 (8), 1:18	Jul 6, 2024	Prudential Center, Newark, New Jersey, U.S.	
13	Win	13–0	Ronal Ron	TKO	4 (8), 1:02	Apr 13, 2024	American Bank Center, Corpus Christi, Texas, U.S.	
12	Win	12–0	Benjamin Gurment	TKO	2 (8), 1:29	Feb 8, 2024	Michelob Ultra Arena, Paradise, Nevada, U.S.	
11	Win	11–0	Jose Cardenas	TKO	2 (6), 1:55	Nov 16, 2023	T-Mobile Arena, Paradise, Nevada, U.S.	
10	Win	10–0	César Villarraga	UD	6	Aug 26, 2023	Hard Rock Casino, Tulsa, Oklahoma, U.S.	
9	Win	9–0	Alex de Oliveria	TKO	2 (6), 2:18	Jul 1, 2023	Huntington Center, Toledo, Ohio, U.S.	
8	Win	8–0	Desmond Lyons	TKO	6 (6), 0:32	May 20, 2023	MGM Grand Arena, Paradise, Nevada, U.S.	
7	Win	7–0	Erick García	KO	1 (6), 1:32	Apr 1, 2023	Hard Rock Casino, Tulsa, Oklahoma, U.S.	
6	Win	6–0	Manuel Guzmán	TKO	2 (6), 2:46	Dec 16, 2022	LaCentre Conference Facility, Westlake, Ohio, U.S.	
5	Win	5–0	Ángel Barrera	TKO	4 (6), 0:21	Oct 20, 2022	Madison Square Garden Theater, New York City, New York, U.S.	
4	Win	4–0	Ángel Rebollar	UD	4	Aug 27, 2022	Hard Rock Hotel & Casino, Tulsa, Oklahoma, U.S.	
3	Win	3–0	Luis Fernandez	TKO	1 (4), 2:39	Jul 23, 2022	Grand Casino, Hinckley, Minnesota, U.S.	
2	Win	2–0	Luciano Ramos	TKO	1 (4), 2:32	Apr 30, 2022	MGM Grand Arena, Paradise, Nevada, U.S.	
1	Win	1–0	Jaylan Phillips	TKO	2 (4), 2:09	Nov 5, 2021	Virgin Hotels, Paradise, Nevada, U.S.	

== See also ==
- List of male boxers
- List of southpaw stance boxers
- List of world lightweight boxing champions

Sporting positions
Regional boxing titles
Vacant Title last held by Raymond Muratalla	NABF lightweight champion April 5, 2025 - 2025; Vacated	Vacant
Vacant Title last held by Raymond Muratalla	NABO lightweight champion April 5, 2025 - 2025; Vacated	Vacant Title next held by Joshua Pagan
World boxing titles
Vacant Title last held by Keyshawn Davis	WBO lightweight champion November 22, 2025 – present	Incumbent
