= Leonardo Mosquea =

French boxer (born 1994)

Personal information
- Nickname: The King
- Nationality: French
- Born: March 11, 1994 (age 32) San Ignacio de Sabaneta, Dominican Republic
- Height: 5 ft 11 in (180 cm)
- Weight: Cruiserweight

Boxing career
- Stance: Orthodox

Boxing record
- Total fights: 18
- Wins: 18
- Win by KO: 11

Leonardo Mosquea (born March 11, 1994) is a French professional boxer who competes in the cruiserweight division where he is the current EBU cruiserweight champion.

== Amateur career ==
The highlight of Mosquea's amateur career was reaching the quarter final of the 2013 French national championships

== Professional career ==
=== Mosquea vs Trush ===
Mosquea claimed the first non-French title of his career after he defeated Ukrainian Viktor Trush. With the win Mosquea claimed the EBU silver cruiserweight title.

=== Mosquea vs. Bregeon ===
Mosquea faced Dylan Bregeon in the first defence of his EBU silver title. Bregeon struggled to keep up with Mosquea's pace and sustained a cut eyebrow in the third round. Mosquea outlanded Bregeon for a dominant points win.

=== Mosquea vs Clarke ===
Mosquea produced the best win of his career when he beat highly rated British prospect Cheavon Clarke in Monte Carlo. He dropped Clarke in the first round and won a split decision. With the win Mosquea became the EBU cruiserweight champion

== Professional boxing record ==
| 18 fights | 18 wins | 0 losses |
|---|---|---|
| By knockout | 11 | 0 |
| By decision | 7 | 0 |

| No. | Result | Record | Opponent | Type | Round, time | Date | Location | Notes |
| 19 | | | (Mexico) Francisco Rivas Ruiz | | | Scheduled on 9 June 2025 | (France) PROGT, Matoury, French Guiana | |
| 18 | Win | 18–0 | (Colombia) Jeison Troncoso | KO | 8 (10) | 19 Dec 2025 | (France) PROGT, Matoury, French Guiana | |
| 17 | Win | 17–0 | (Argentina) Ivan Gabriel Garcia | TKO | 9(10) | 25 Jun 2025 | Hall des sports Marcel Sultana, Bron, Rhône, France | |
| 16 | Win | 16–0 | (United Kingdom) Cheavon Clarke | SD | 12 | 14 Dec 2024 | Salle des Étoiles, Monte Carlo, Monaco | |
| 15 | Win | 15–0 | (France) Dylan Bregeon | UD | 12 | 22 Jun 2024 | Hall des sports Marcel Sultana, Bron, Rhône, France | |
| 14 | Win | 14–0 | (Tunisia) Sadok Sebki | UD | 6 | 9 Mar 2024 | Palais des sports, Caen, Calvados, France | |
| 13 | Win | 13–0 | (Ukraine) Viktor Trush | TKO | 6 (12), 2:48 | 25 Nov 2023 | (France) PROGT, Matoury, French Guiana | |
| 12 | Win | 12–0 | (France) John Franck Mendy | KO | 5 (10) | 24 Jun 2023 | Hall des sports Marcel Sultana, Bron, Rhône, France | |
| 11 | Win | 11–0 | (France) Brice Clavier | TKO | 1 (10) | 11 Mar 2023 | (France) Hall départemental Georges Donzenac, Cayenne, French Guiana | |
| 10 | Win | 10–0 | (Georgia (country)) Geriso Aduashvili | TKO | 2 (6) | 22 Oct 2022 | Palais des sports, Bourgoin Jallieu, Isère, France | |
| 9 | Win | 9–0 | (France) Fabrice Lewis Menayame | UD | 6 | 30 Jun 2022 | Iceparc, Angers, Maine-et-Loire, France | |
| 8 | Win | 8–0 | (Democratic Republic of the Congo) Blanchard Kalambay | TKO | 1 (8) | 12 Mar 2022 | Bron, Rhône, France | |
| 7 | Win | 7–0 | (Tunisia) Sadok Sebki | TKO | 4 (6) | 4 Dec 2021 | Halle Martenot, Rennes, Ille-et-Vilaine, France | |
| 6 | Win | 6–0 | (France) Fabrice Lewis Menayame | TKO | 5 (6) | 20 Nov 2021 | Summum, Grenoble, Isère, France | |
| 5 | Win | 5–0 | (Serbia) Stefan Mihailov | UD | 6 | 31 Oct 2021 | Salle des fêtes, Villedieu les poêles, Manche, France | |
| 4 | Win | 4–0 | (Georgia (country)) Zura Mekereshvili | UD | 6 | 3 Jul 2021 | Hall des sports Marcel Sultana, Bron, Rhône, France | |
| 3 | Win | 3–0 | (Bulgaria) Ivan Nikolov | TKO | 1 (4), 2:40 | 19 Jun 2021 | International Hotel Casino, Golden Sands, Bulgaria | |
| 2 | Win | 2–0 | (Croatia) Tomislav Rudan | KO | 2 (6), 1:29 | 5 Dec 2020 | Fight Off Training Center, Wavre, Walloon Brabant, Belgium | |
| 1 | Win | 1–0 | (France) Cedric Severac | UD | 6 | 7 Dec 2019 | (France) Espace Sportifs Serge Marigard, Cayenne, French Guiana | |
