= David Picasso =

Mexican boxer (born 2000)

Personal information
- Nickname: El Rey
- Born: Alan David Picasso Romero; July 22, 2000 (age 26) Mexico City, Mexico
- Height: 5 ft 8 in (173 cm)
- Weight: Super-bantamweight; Featherweight

Boxing career
- Reach: 70 in (178 cm)
- Stance: Orthodox

Boxing record
- Total fights: 36
- Wins: 33
- Win by KO: 18
- Losses: 2
- Draws: 1

Alan David Picasso Romero (born July 22, 2000) is a Mexican professional boxer. He challenged for the undisputed world super-bantamweight title in 2025.

== Professional career ==
Picasso made his professional debut against Jose Antonio Arellano Lopez on March 25, 2017. He won the fight by split decision.

On July 15, 2023, he fought Sabelo Ngebinyana for the WBC Silver super-bantamweight title. Picasso won the fight by technical knockout in the sixth round.

On July 19, 2024, it was announced that Picasso would defend his title against Azat Hovhannisyan on the Mayweather-Gotti III undercard on August 24, 2024. He won the fight by unanimous decision.

On July 19, 2025 at MGM Grand Garden Arena in Paradise, Nevada, Picasso fought Kyonosuke Kameda on the undercard of Manny Pacquiao-Mario Barrios undercard, winning by majority decision.

On December 27, 2025, he challenged undisputed super-bantamweight champion Naoya Inoue at the Mohammed Abdo Arena in Riyadh, Saudi Arabia. Picasso lost by unanimous decision to suffer his first professional defeat.

He returned to winning ways in his next fight with a second round stoppage of Maicol Rincon for the vacant WBC Silver featherweight title at Sala Urbana in Naucalpan, Mexico, on August 29, 2026. Picasso lost the title in his first defense, losing via split decision to Carl Jammes Martin at Kingdom Arena in Riyadh, Saudi Arabia, on October 31, 2026.

== Professional boxing record ==
36 fights	33 wins	2 losses
By knockout	18	0
By decision	15	2
Draws	1	

No.	Result	Record	Opponent	Type	Round, time	Date	Location	Notes
36	Loss	33–2–1	Carl Jammes Martin	SD	10	Oct 31, 2026	Kingdom Arena, Riyadh, Saudi Arabia	Lost WBC Silver featherweight title
35	Win	33–1–1	Maicol Rincon	TKO	2 (10), 0:44	Aug 29, 2026	Sala Urbana, Naucalpan, Mexico	Won vacant WBC Silver featherweight title
34	Loss	32–1–1	Naoya Inoue	UD	12	Dec 27, 2025	Mohammed Abdo Arena, Riyadh, Saudi Arabia	For WBA (Super), WBC, IBF, WBO and The Ring super bantamweight titles
33	Win	32–0–1	Kyonosuke Kameda	MD	10	Jul 19, 2025	MGM Grand Garden Arena, Paradise, Nevada, U.S.	
32	Win	31–0–1	Yehison Cuello	KO	3 (10), 1:55	Dec 14, 2024	Estadio Caliente, Tijuana, Mexico	
31	Win	30–0–1	Diego Alberto Ruiz	UD	8	Oct 5, 2024	Pachuca, Hidalgo, Mexico	
30	Win	29–0–1	Azat Hovhannisyan	UD	12	Aug 24, 2024	Arena Ciudad de México, Mexico City, Mexico	Won vacant WBC Silver super bantamweight title
29	Win	28–0–1	Damien Vazquez	TKO	5 (8), 2:11	May 4, 2024	T-Mobile Arena, Paradise, Nevada, U.S.	
28	Win	27–0–1	Erik Ruiz	UD	10	Jan 27, 2024	Footprint Center, Phoenix, Arizona, U.S.	
27	Win	26–0–1	Yeison Vargas	TKO	2 (10), 2:20	Oct 06, 2023	Arena Sonora, Hermosillo, Mexico	
26	Win	25–0–1	Sabelo Ngebinyana	TKO	6 (10)	Jul 15, 2023	Restaurante Arroyo, Mexico City, Mexico	Won vacant WBC Silver super bantamweight title
25	Win	24–0–1	Kevin Villanueva	TKO	6 (10), 1:26	Mar 4, 2023	Mérida, Yucatán, Mexico	
24	Win	23–0–1	Alexander Mejia	TKO	4 (10), 2:10	Nov 12, 2022	Acapulco, Guerrero, Mexico	
23	Win	22–0–1	Pablo Ariel Gomez	TKO	6 (10), 0:19	Aug 27, 2022	San Pedro, Nuevo León, Mexico	
22	Win	21–0–1	David Reyes Cota	TKO	4 (10), 1:22	Apr 9, 2022	Centro de Espectáculos del Recinto Ferial, Metepec, Mexico	Won vacant NABF super bantamweight title
21	Win	20–0–1	Cesar Ignacio Paredes	RTD	6 (10), 3:00	Jan 15, 2022	La Casa de los Zonkeys, Tijuana, Mexico	
20	Win	19–0–1	Luis Millan	KO	2 (10), 2:10	Nov 18, 2021	Gimnasio TV Azteca, Mexico City, Mexico	
19	Win	18–0–1	Alfredo Mejia Vargas	UD	10	Sep 25, 2021	Complejo Deportivo La Inalámbrica, Mérida, Mexico	
18	Win	17–0–1	Edixon Perez	TKO	6 (10), 1:17	Jul 17, 2021	Gimnasio TV Azteca, Mexico City, Mexico	
17	Win	16–0–1	Miguel Moreno Gonzalez	UD	10	Apr 10, 2021	Grand Hotel, Tijuana, Mexico	
16	Win	15–0–1	Jesus Gomez Quintana	KO	2 (10), 2:43	Feb 6, 2021	Jardines del Pedregal, Hermosillo, Mexico	
15	Win	14–0–1	Florentino Perez Hernandez	UD	8	Jun 27, 2020	Gimnasio TV Azteca, Mexico City, Mexico	
14	Win	13–0–1	Jesus Quijada	UD	10	Mar 14, 2020	Auditorio Municipal, Tijuana, Mexico	Won vacant WBC Youth Intercontinental featherweight title
13	Win	12–0–1	Anthony Jimenez Salas	UD	10	Dec 21, 2019	Deportivo Morelos Pavon, Mexico City, Mexico	Won vacant WBC Youth Intercontinental super bantamweight title
12	Win	11–0–1	Victor Proa	RTD	3 (8), 3:00	Oct 26, 2019	Plaza de Toros La Union, Ameca, Mexico	
11	Win	10–0–1	Carlos Alberto Ocampo	TKO	2 (8), 1:23	Sep 7, 2019	Arena José Sulaimán, Monterrey, Mexico	
10	Win	9–0–1	Angel Martinez Castillo	UD	8	Jul 13, 2019	Domo del Parque de la Solidaridad, Tonalá, Mexico	
9	Win	8–0–1	Nahum Ceron Cruz	UD	8	May 15, 2019	Deportivo del Sindicato del Metro, Mexico City, Mexico	
8	Win	7–0–1	Victor Tovar	UD	4	Feb 9, 2019	Domo Sindicato de Trabajadores IMSS, Mexico City, Mexico	
7	Win	6–0–1	Gerardo Yescas	UD	4	Dec 22, 2018	Auditorio Municipal Fausto Gutiérrez Moreno, Tijuana, Mexico	
6	Win	5–0–1	Victor Manuel Martinez Flores	KO	1 (4), 2:47	Nov 10, 2018	Auditorio Municipal, Tijuana, Mexico	
5	Draw	4–0–1	Martin Jimenez Delgado	TD	6	Mar 10, 2018	Domo Sindicato de Trabajadores IMSS, Mexico City, Mexico	
4	Win	4–0	Oscar Espinoza	KO	2 (4), 1:48	Aug 12, 2017	Gimnasio Nuevo León Unido, Monterrey, Mexico	
3	Win	3–0	Jose Gallardo	TKO	1 (4), 1:27	Jun 10, 2017	Gimnasio Municipal, Guaymas, Mexico	
2	Win	2–0	Rogelio Armenta	UD	4	Apr 29, 2017	Gimnasio Manuel Bernardo Aguirre, Chihuahua, Mexico	
1	Win	1–0	Jose Antonio Arellano Lopez	SD	4	Mar 25, 2017	Gimnasio Municipal, Palenque, Mexico	
