= Goki Kobayashi =

Japanese boxer (born 1998)

Personal information
- Nationality: Japanese
- Born: 小林豪己; 11 December 1998 (age 27) Kobe, Japan
- Height: 5 ft 3 in (160 cm)
- Weight: Mini flyweight Flyweight

Boxing career
- Stance: Orthodox

Boxing record
- Total fights: 10
- Wins: 8
- Win by KO: 5
- Losses: 2

Goki Kobayashi (Japanese: 小林豪己, Kobayashi Goki; born December 11, 1998) is a Japanese professional boxer.

== Professional boxing career ==
=== Early career ===
Kobayashi made his professional boxing debut against the 2020 West Japan "Rookie of the Year" Hyogo Kimura on 6 June 2021, at the Amagasaki Cultural Center in Amagasaki, Japan. He won the fight by a sixth-round technical knockout. Kobayashi was expected to face the once-defeated Hayato Aoki on 11 September 2021. The bout was later postponed until 6 November 2021. He won the fight by unanimous decision, with two scorecards of 60–54 and one scorecard of 59–55.

Kobayashi faced Sora Takeda on 6 March 2022. He made quick work of his opponent, as he stopped him at the 2:38 minute mark of the opening round. Kobayashi next faced the more experienced Cris Ganoza on 25 September 2022. He won the fight by a second-round knockout.

=== WBO AP mini-flyweight champion ===
His four-fight win streak earned Kobayashi the chance to face the #6 ranked WBC mini flyweight contender Marco John Rementizo for the vacant WBO Asia Pacific title. The title bout was booked as the co-main event of "REAL SPIRITS VOL.84", which took place on 4 December 2022 at the Osaka Prefectural Gymnasium in Osaka, Japan. He captured the vacant belt by unanimous decision, with scores of 97–92, 97–92 and 98–91.

Kobayashi defended his WBO Asia Pacific title against undefeated Filipino Roslan Eco on 6 May 2023, scoring a fourth round TKO. Kobayashi made his maiden title defense against Jake Amparo on 5 August 2023 at the Central Gym in Kobe, Japan. Kobayashi was knocked down by a right hook early in the opening round and lost the fight by unanimous decision, with scores of 114–112, 114–112 and 117–109.

Kobayashi faced the once-defeated Yuri Kanaya for the vacant WBO Asia Pacific title on 3 February 2024. The championship bout headlined the 11th "Who's Next Dynamic Glove" on U-Next, which took place at the Korakuen Hall in Tokyo, Japan. Kobayashi won the fight by a third-round technical knockout.

== Professional boxing record ==
10 fights	8 wins	2 losses
By knockout	5	0
By decision	3	2

No.	Result	Record	Opponent	Type	Round, time	Date	Location	Notes
10	Loss	8–2	Yuni Takada	SD	12	24 Jan 2025	Ariake Arena, Tokyo, Japan	Lost WBO Asia Pacific mini-flyweight title
9	Win	8–1	Joseph Sumabong	UD	10	23 Jun 2024	Osaka Prefectural Gymnasium, Osaka, Japan	Retained WBO Asia Pacific mini-flyweight title
8	Win	7–1	Yuri Kanaya	TKO	3 (10), 2:27	3 Feb 2024	Korakuen Hall, Tokyo, Japan	Won vacant WBO Asia Pacific mini-flyweight title
7	Loss	6–1	Jake Amparo	UD	12	5 Aug 2023	Central Gym, Kobe, Japan	Lost WBO Asia Pacific mini-flyweight title
6	Win	6–0	Roslan Eco	TKO	4 (10), 0:34	6 May 2023	Korakuen Hall, Tokyo, Japan	Retained WBO Asia Pacific mini-flyweight title
5	Win	5–0	Marco John Rementizo	UD	10	4 Dec 2022	Osaka Prefectural Gymnasium, Osaka, Japan	Won vacant WBO Asia Pacific mini-flyweight title
4	Win	4–0	Cris Ganoza	KO	2 (8), 2:41	25 Sep 2022	Sambo Hall, Kobe, Japan	
3	Win	3–0	Sora Takeda	TKO	1 (8), 2:38	6 Mar 2022	Central Gym, Kobe, Japan	
2	Win	2–0	Hayato Aoki	UD	6	6 Nov 2021	Korakuen Hall, Tokyo, Japan	
1	Win	1–0	Hyogo Kimura	TKO	6 (6), 2:52	6 Nov 2021	Amagasaki Cultural Center, Amagasaki, Japan	
