= Meiirim Nursultanov =

Kazakh boxer

Personal information
- Nationality: Kazakh
- Born: 29 July 1993 (age 32) Merki, Kazakhstan
- Height: 6 ft (183 cm)
- Weight: Middleweight

Boxing career
- Stance: Orthodox

Boxing record
- Total fights: 20
- Wins: 20
- Win by KO: 11

Meiirim Nursultanov (born July 29, 1993) is a Kazakh professional boxer. Nursultanov has held the WBO International Middleweight title since 2022.

== Boxing career ==
As an amateur, Nursultanov won the 2015 Kazakhstan National Title and fought in World Series of Boxing. Nursultanov, originally from Kazakhstan but training out of Los Angeles, made his professional debut November 19, 2016. He gained the WBO International Middleweight title in February 2022, and on April 15, 2023, he retained his title by KO against Kazuto Takesato in the eighth round. On November 17, 2023, Nursultanov won via Unanimous Decision over Chile's Julio Alamos.

== Professional boxing record ==
20 fights	20 wins	0 losses
By knockout	11	0
By decision	9	0

No.	Result	Record	Opponent	Type	Round, time	Date	Location	Notes
20	Win	20–0	(Chile) Julio Álamos	UD	12	Nov 17, 2023	Humo Arena, Tashkent, Uzbekistan	
19	Win	19–0	(Japan) Kazuto Takesako	TKO	8 (12) 2:33	Apr 15, 2023	PARADISE CITY PLAZA, Incheon, South Korea	Retained WBO International Middleweight Title
18	Win	18–0	(Argentina) Marcelo Cóceres	UD	10	Oct 01, 2022	MOSiR Hall, Al. Zygmuntowskie 4, Lublin, Poland	Retained WBO International Middleweight Title
17	Win	17–0	(Argentina) Sebastian Horacio Papeschi	TKO	5 (10) 0:47	Jun 11, 2022	Rixos Water World Aktau, Aktau, Kazakhstan	Retained WBO International Middleweight Title
16	Win	16–0	(Russia) Andrey Sirotkin	RTD	5 (10)	Feb 05, 2022	Rixos Water World Aktau, Aktau, Kazakhstan	Vacant WBO International Middleweight Title
15	Win	15–0	(Belarus) Dzmitry Atrokhau	UD	8	Nov 06, 2021	Halyk arena sport complex, Aktau, Kazakhstan	
14	Win	14–0	(Russia) Ilya Balandin	UD	8	Dec 05, 2020	RCC Boxing Academy, Ekaterinburg, Russia	
13	Win	13–0	(Mexico) Cristian Olivas	UD	10	Nov 02, 2019	(United States) MGM Grand, Grand Garden Arena, Las Vegas, Nevada U.S.	Won WBC USA Middleweight title
12	Win	12–0	(Russia) Artur Osipov	UD	10	Aug 24, 2019	Traktor Sport Palace, Chelyabinsk, Russia	
11	Win	11–0	(Puerto Rico) Luis Hernandez	UD	8	Mar 24, 2019	(United States) The Avalon, Hollywood, California	
10	Win	10–0	(Mexico) Ramon Aguinaga	KO	2 (8) 2:50	Jan 11, 2019	(United States) Chumash Casino, Santa Ynez, California, U.S.	
9	Win	9–0	(United States) Jamar Freeman	UD	8	Oct 13, 2018	(United States) Hard Rock Hotel and Casino, Las Vegas, Nevada, U.S.	Won Vacant North American Boxing Federation Junior Middleweight title
8	Win	8–0	(Dominican Republic) Jonathan Batista	RTD	2 (8) 3:00	Aug 04, 2018	(United States) Hard Rock Hotel & Casino, Atlantic City, New Jersey, U.S.	
7	Win	7–0	(Mexico) Josue Obando	KO	6 (6) 1:37	Jun 23, 2018	(United States) Belasco Theater, Los Angeles, California	
6	Win	6–0	(Mexico) Alejandro Torres	TKO	6 (6)	Mar 03, 2018	(United States) Madison Square Garden Theater, New York, U.S.	
5	Win	5–0	(United States) Eric Moon	TKO	2 (6)	Nov 25, 2017	(United States) Madison Square Garden Theater, New York, U.S.	
4	Win	4–0	(Brazil) Ismael Bueno	TKO	1 (6) 0:50	Sep 09, 2017	Saryarka Velodrome, Astana, Kazakhstan	
3	Win	3–0	(United States) Lanny Dardar	KO	1 (6) 1:47	Jul 14, 2017	(United States) Belasco Theater, Los Angeles, California	
2	Win	2–0	(Mexico) Javier Olvera	TKO	2 (6) 1:15	Apr 15, 2017	(United States) Mohegan Sun Casino, Uncasville, Connecticut, U.S.	
1	Win	1–0	(United States) Henry Beckford	UD	6	Nov 19, 2016	(United States) T-Mobile Arena, Las Vegas, Nevada, U.S.	Professional debut
