= Jadier Herrera =

Cuban boxer (born 2002)

Personal information
- Nickname: One Billion
- Born: Jadier Herrera Montero; 9 September 2002 (age 24) Camagüey, Cuba
- Height: 5 ft 11 in (180 cm)
- Weight: Lightweight

Boxing career
- Stance: Southpaw

Boxing record
- Total fights: 18
- Wins: 18
- Win by KO: 16

Jadier Herrera (born 9 September 2002) is a Cuban professional boxer. He has held the WBC interim lightweight title since January 2026.

== Professional career ==
Herrera defeated by unanimous decision Mark John Yap of the Philippines on February 26, 2022 for the vacant WBA Asia South super-featherweight title. On June 18, 2022, he won the vacant WBC International super-featherweight title with a sixth round technical stoppage of Pablo Robles. On November 13, 2022, Herrera defeated Franklin Manzanilla in his first defense of the WBC International super-featherweight title.

On 10 January 2026, Herrera defeated Ricardo Núñez by technical knockout in the eighth round at Rudolf Weber-Arena in Oberhausen, Germany, to win the vacant WBC interim lightweight title.

== Professional boxing record ==
| 18 fights | 18 wins | 0 losses |
|---|---|---|
| By knockout | 16 | 0 |
| By decision | 2 | 0 |

| No. | Result | Record | Opponent | Type | Round, time | Date | Location | Notes |
|---|---|---|---|---|---|---|---|---|
| 18 | Win | 18–0 | Ricardo Núñez | TKO | 8 (12) 2:15 | Jan 10, 2026 | Rudolf Weber-Arena, Oberhausen, Germany | Won vacant WBC interim lightweight title |
| 17 | Win | 17–0 | Jose Macias Enriquez | TKO | 7 (10) 2:31 | Mar 15, 2025 | Echo Arena, Liverpool, England, Great Britain | Retained WBA Inter-Continental lightweight title |
| 16 | Win | 16–0 | Oliver Flores | TKO | 3 (10) 0:30 | Oct 05, 2024 | Echo Arena, Liverpool, England, Great Britain | Won vacant WBA Inter-Continental lightweight title |
| 15 | Win | 15–0 | Andres Navarrete | TKO | 1 (8) 1:41 | Jun 28, 2024 | The SSE Arena (Odyssey Arena), Belfast, Northern Ireland, Great Britain | |
| 14 | Win | 14–0 | Mariano Jorge Bertola | TKO | 4 (10) | Apr 19, 2024 | La Perle, Dubai, UAE | |
| 13 | Win | 13–0 | Ulises Suarez Ortega | KO | 2 (8) 1:26 | Jan 27, 2024 | Cuban Boxing Club, Dubai, UAE | |
| 12 | Win | 12–0 | Eric Quarm | TKO | 4 (10), 0:57 | Jul 22, 2023 | Dubai Studio City, Dubai, UAE | |
| 11 | Win | 11–0 | Jeff Ofori | KO | 4 (10) | May 13, 2023 | Agenda Arena, Dubai, UAE | Retained WBC International super-featherweight title |
| 10 | Win | 10–0 | Harmonito Dela Torre | KO | 3 (8), 2:29 | Mar 10, 2023 | Cuban Boxing Club, Dubai, UAE | |
| 9 | Win | 9–0 | Franklin Manzanilla | RTD | 5 (10), 3:00 | Nov 13, 2022 | Coca-Cola Arena, Dubai, UAE | Retained WBC International super-featherweight title |
| 8 | Win | 8–0 | Mauro Perouene | TD | 7 (8), 0:31 | Aug 13, 2022 | Humo Arena, Tashkent, Uzbekistan | |
| 7 | Win | 7–0 | Pablo Robles | RTD | 6 (10), 3:00 | Jun 18, 2022 | Caesars Palace Dubai, Dubai, UAE | Won vacant WBC International super-featherweight title |
| 6 | Win | 6–0 | Mark John Yap | UD | 10 | Feb 26, 2022 | Dubai Marina, Dubai, UAE | Won vacant WBA Asia South super-featherweight title |
| 5 | Win | 5–0 | Eduardo Mancito | KO | 4 (8), 0:43 | Jan 15, 2022 | Cuban Boxing Club, Dubai, UAE | |
| 4 | Win | 4–0 | Fred Sayuni | TKO | 1 (8), 3:00 | Dec 15, 2021 | Cuban Boxing Club, Dubai, UAE | |
| 3 | Win | 3–0 | Resnu Sundava | TKO | 1 (6), 1:53 | Oct 23, 2021 | Conrad Dubai, Dubai, UAE | |
| 2 | Win | 2–0 | Oluwaseun Emmanuel Oluwasuy | KO | 4 (4), 1:06 | Sep 18, 2021 | Sport Society, Dubai, UAE | |
| 1 | Win | 1–0 | Medi Miiro | TKO | 1 (4), 0:40 | Jul 24, 2021 | Round 10 Boxing Club, Dubai, UAE | |

== Personal life ==
Herrera resides in Dubai, United Arab Emirates. He is the grandson of Cuban double Olympic gold medal winning boxer Ángel Herrera Vera.

== See also ==
- Notable boxing families
- List of southpaw stance boxers

Sporting positions
Regional boxing titles
| Vacant Title last held by Muhammadkhuja Yaqubov | WBC International super-featherweight champion June 18, 2022 – May 12, 2023; Stripped, did not make weight | Vacant Title next held by Ryan Garner |
