= Jayson Vayson =

Filipino boxer (born 1998)

Personal information
- Nickname: Striker
- Born: Jayson Paden Vayson; May 11, 1998 (age 28) Veruela, Agusan del Sur, Philippines
- Height: 1.63 m (5 ft 4 in)
- Weight: Mini-flyweight; Light-flyweight; Flyweight

Boxing career
- Reach: 168 cm (66 in)
- Stance: Orthodox

Boxing record
- Total fights: 19
- Wins: 15
- Win by KO: 8
- Losses: 2
- Draws: 1
- No contests: 1

Jayson Paden Vayson (born 11 May 1998) is a Filipino professional boxer who held the WBO Asia Pacific light flyweight title in 2023.

== Education ==
Vayson went to Sinobong National High School for his studies.

== Professional career ==
=== Early career ===
On October 15, 2016, Vayson made his professional debut against Cotabato del Sur's Frankie Batuon, eventually, Vayson came out victorious via 3rd-round technical knockout, by October 2018 to September 2019, Vayson amassed a record of 8–0 before tying with subsequent IBF mini-flyweight champion, Rene Mark Cuarto.

Vayson was expected to face world-class compatriot, Mark Vicelles on October 30, 2021, however, a month before the bout was supposed to take place, on September 24, 2021, Vayson withdrew from the fight due to an apparent injury sustained in training.

=== Vayson vs. Monabesa ===
After 2 years of Inactivity, Vayson returned against former IBO and the then current WBC International light-flyweight champion, Tibo Monabesa for Monabesa's WBC International title on February 27, 2022, at Holywings Club, Jakarta. Vayson and Monabesa would both show an incredible clash with Vayson scoring a knockdown in rounds 3 and 9 while Monabesa scored a knockdown in round 8, although, Vayson seemed like he outperformed Monabesa, the judges scored it: 94–94 even, 95–93 and 95–94 for Monabesa, causing Vayson's coach, Allan Alegria to file complaint afterwards. On March 7, 2022, the WBC declared the bout as no contest, stating: "The 10 judges who evaluated the fight during this process scored the fight in favor of the Philippine challenger by a wide margin", the WBC was also informed that the panel of officials were all local and not a neutral one, therefore, Monabesa would keep his title and Vayson would remain undefeated.

=== Vayson vs. Lalbiakkima ===
Vayson would fly to Dubai to challenge the then undefeated Indian boxer, Nutlai Lalbiakkima for the vacant ABCO Asian Continental light-flyweight championship, Vayson would outperform his opponent and would be granted a win via decision.

=== Vayson vs. Akui ===
On February 4, 2023, Vayson moved up weight to clash with subsequent WBA flyweight champion, Seigo Yuri Akui on a 10-rounds contest at Korakuen Hall. Vayson would lose his undefeated status as Akui defeated him via "shutout decision".

Supposedly, Vayson would battle out with fellow previously outpointed, Jackson Chauke for the vacant IBF Inter-Continental flyweight title on May 27, 2023, in South Africa. However, the bout was suddenly cancelled.

=== Vayson vs. Yamanaka ===
In December 2023, Vayson would move back down to the light-flyweight division for his upcoming bout against Ryuya Yamanaka at Kobe, Japan with the WBO Asia Pacific title at stake, although Vayson was again expected to lose at Japan, instead, Vayson shocked the former WBO mini-flyweight champion as he landed an uppercut that Yamanaka could not continue from en route to a scintillating second-round technical knockout.

== Professional boxing record ==
19 fights	15 wins	2 losses
By knockout	8	1
By decision	7	1
Draws	1	
No contests	1	

No.	Result	Record	Opponent	Type	Round, Time	Date	Location	Notes
19	Win	15–2–1 (1)	Robert Paradero	UD	6	16 May 2027	Bonifacio Naval Station Covered Court, Taguig, Philippines	
18	Loss	14–2–1 (1)	Oscar Collazo	TKO	7 (12), 1:41	20 Sep 2025	Fantasy Springs Casino, Indio, California, U.S.	For WBA (Super), WBO, and The Ring mini-flyweight titles
17	Win	14–1–1 (1)	Jirawat Aiamong	KO	2 (8), 1:35	29 Mar 2025	World Siam Stadium, Bangkok, Thailand	
16	Win	13–1–1 (1)	Shanborlang Marbaniang	TKO	9 (10), 2:40	26 Sep 2024	Spaceplus Bangkok RCA, Bangkok, Thailand	Won vacant ABF flyweight title
15	Win	12–1–1 (1)	Takeru Inoue	UD	10	21 Apr 2024	Sumiyoshi Ward Center, Osaka, Japan	Retained WBO Asia Pacific light-flyweight title
14	Win	11–1–1 (1)	Ryuya Yamanaka	TKO	2 (12), 1:14	17 Dec 2023	Portopia Hotel, Kobe, Japan	Won WBO Asia Pacific light-flyweight title
13	Loss	10–1–1 (1)	Seigo Yuri Akui	UD	10	4 Feb 2023	Korakuen Hall, Tokyo, Japan	
12	Win	10–0–1 (1)	Nutlai Lalbiakkima	SD	10	18 Jun 2022	World Trade Center, Dubai, United Arab Emirates	Won vacant WBC-ABCO Continental light-flyweight title
11	NC	9–0–1 (1)	Tibo Monabesa	NC	10	27 Feb 2022	Holywings Club, Jakarta, Indonesia	WBC International light-flyweight title at stake; Originally an MD win for Monabesa, was later reviewed and was declared NC by the WBC
10	Win	9–0–1	Geboi Mansalayao	KO	3 (8), 1:49	15 Feb 2020	Manila Arena, Manila, Philippines	
9	Draw	8–0–1	Rene Mark Cuarto	PTS	6	7 Sep 2019	Jurado Hall of the Philippine Marine Corp, Taguig, Philippines	
8	Win	8–0	Ronald Alapormina	UD	6	6 Oct 2018	Justice George Malcolm Square, Baguio, Philippines	
7	Win	7–0	Jonathan Almacen	UD	8	30 Jun 2018	Justice George Malcolm Square, Baguio, Philippines	
6	Win	6–0	Alvin Tayo	RTD	4 (6), 3:00	14 Apr 2018	Justice George Malcolm Square, Baguio, Philippines	
5	Win	5–0	Rez Padrogane	TKO	3 (6), 2:45	28 Jan 2018	Municipal Gymnasium, Pigkawayan, Philippines	
4	Win	4–0	Alvin Tayo	SD	6	2 Sep 2017	Tayug Covered Court, Tayug, Philippines	
3	Win	3–0	Alvin Dologuin	TKO	2 (4), 2:51	9 May 2017	F.L. Dy Coliseum, Cauayan, Philippines	
2	Win	2–0	Roger Salaton	UD	4	23 Dec 2016	Almendras Gym, Davao City, Philippines	
1	Win	1–0	Frankie Batuon	TKO	3 (4), 0:45	15 Oct 2016	Pigkawayan, Cotabato del Norte Philippines	
