= Suzumi Takayama =

Japanese professional boxer

Personal information
- Nationality: Japanese
- Born: 高山涼深; 17 October 1996 (age 29) Tokyo, Japan
- Height: 5 ft 5 in (165 cm)
- Weight: Super Flyweight

Boxing career
- Stance: Southpaw

Boxing record
- Total fights: 9
- Wins: 9
- Win by KO: 8

Suzumi Takayama (高山涼深, Takayama Suzumi, born October 19, 1996) is a Japanese professional boxer. He currently competes in the super-flyweight division.

== Professional career ==
Takayama claimed the first title of his career in his third fight when he beat Tetsuro Ohashi to win the Japanese Youth Super Flyweight title. Takayama fell Ohashi in the opening round before being felled himself. He felled Ohashi twice more in the 8th round that brought an end to the game. Takayama claimed the Japanese Super Flyweight title in his 6th fight after beating Ryusei Kawaura in the 4th round. There were no knockdowns although Takayama battered Kawaura from pillar to post causing the referee to intervene. Takayama defended his title for the first time against Ryusei Murachi. He knocked Murachi down in the third round, and twice more in the eight to end the game. He made his second defence against Akio Furutani. Despite losing the first round, Takayama scored two knockdowns in the 3rd round to force the referee to jump in.

== Professional boxing record ==
9 fights	9 wins	0 losses
By knockout	8	0
By decision	1	0

No.	Result	Record	Opponent	Type	Round, time	Date	Location	Notes
9	Win	9–0	Isao Aoyama	KO	2 (10), 3:06	25 Apr 2024	Korakuen Hall, Tokyo, Japan	Retained Japanese super flyweight title
8	Win	8–0	Akio Furutani	TKO	3 (10), 1:31	25 Apr 2024	Korakuen Hall, Tokyo, Japan	Retained Japanese super flyweight title
7	Win	7–0	Tsubasa Murachi	TKO	8 (10), 2:44	22 Sep 2023	Korakuen Hall, Tokyo, Japan	Retained Japanese super flyweight title
6	Win	6–0	Ryusei Kawaura	TKO	4 (10), 1:05	13 Jun 2023	Korakuen Hall, Tokyo, Japan	Won vacant Japanese super flyweight title
5	Win	5–0	Kai Chiba	UD	8	30 Oct 2021	Korakuen Hall, Tokyo, Japan	
4	Win	4–0	Kosuke Tomioka	TKO	1 (6), 1:47	21 Jul 2021	Korakuen Hall, Tokyo, Japan	
3	Win	3–0	Tetsuro Ohashi	KO	8 (8), 0:35	19 Oct 2019	Central Gym, Kobe, Japan	
2	Win	2–0	In Soo Jang	TKO	1 (6), 2:06	25 Jun 2019	Korakuen Hall, Tokyo, Japan	
1	Win	1–0	Nirun Baonok	KO	3 (6), 1:38	26 Feb 2019	Korakuen Hall, Tokyo, Japan	
