= Carl Jammes Martin =

Filipino boxer (born 1999)

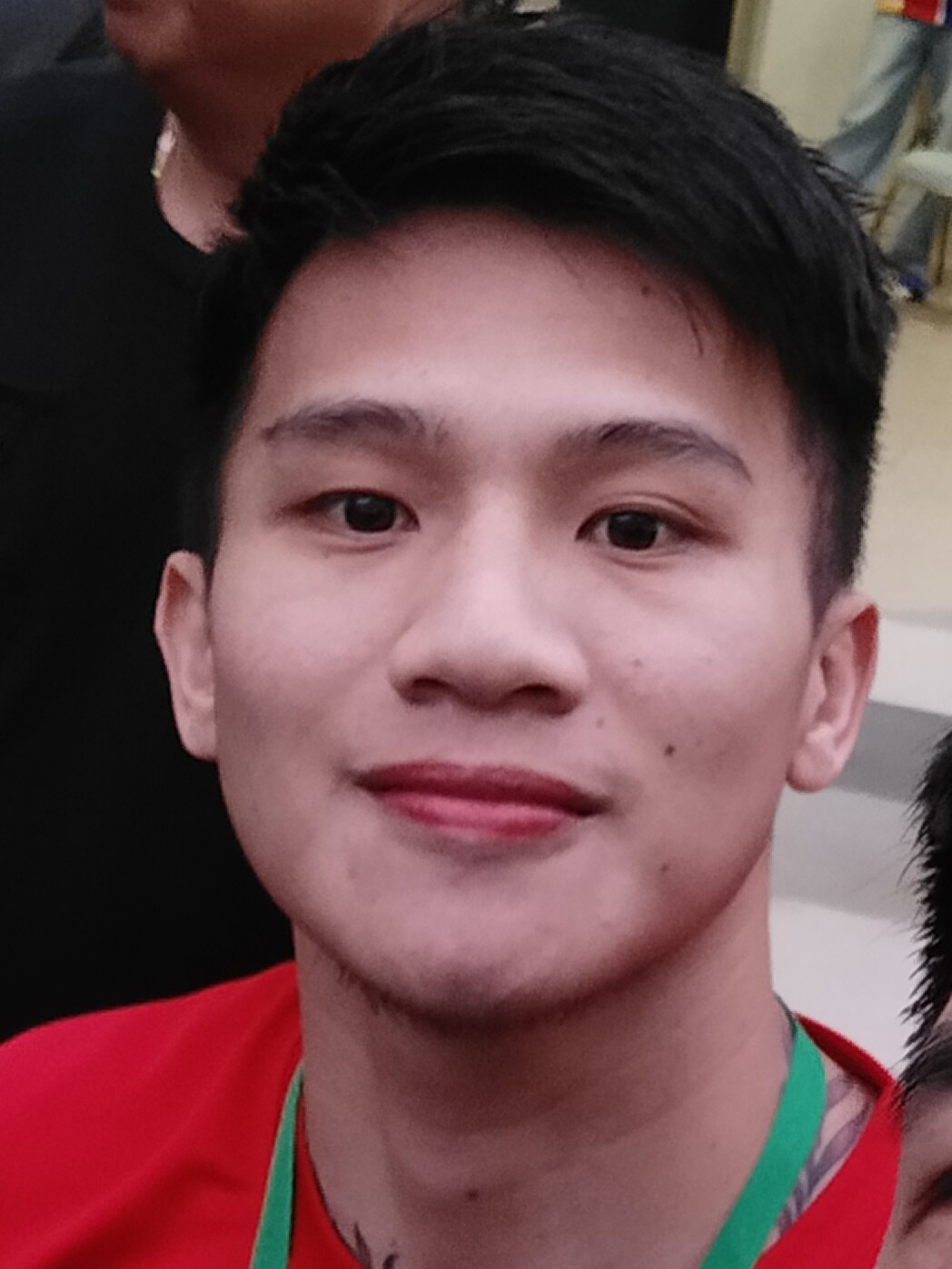
- Martin in 2025

Personal information
- Nickname: Wonder Boy
- Nationality: Filipino
- Born: Carl Jammes Calingayan Martin; 18 May 1999 (age 27) Lagawe, Ifugao, Philippines
- Height: 5 ft 6 in (1.68 m)
- Weight: Bantamweight; Super bantamweight Featherweight

Boxing career
- Stance: Southpaw

Boxing record
- Total fights: 29
- Wins: 29
- Win by KO: 21
- Losses: 0
- Draws: 0

Carl Jammes Calingayan Martin (born 18 May 1999) is a Filipino professional boxer. He held the WBC Silver featherweight title since October 2026.

== Early life and amateur career ==
Martin was born and raised in Lagawe, a 4th class municipality of Ifugao province. He was introduced to boxing in his early age and as an amateur boxer Martin won the Paperweight Bronze Medal at the Philippine Youth Games-Batang Pinoy, before turning pro in 2016, at the age of 16.

== Professional career ==
=== Bantamweight division ===
Martin made his professional debut on 5 March 2016, defeating fellow Filipino boxer, Jayar Omac via a round two corner retirement. A couple of months later, Martin registered his second professional win by defeating fellow Filipino boxer, Noel Guliman via a round two technical knockout. He extended his winning streak to three after defeating Manny Mamacquiao via a technical knockout in the fifth round.

Martin won his first title by defeating Jason Buenaobra, winning the bout via a unanimous decision through eight rounds. Following the bout, Martin defeated Jerry Mae Villagracia via a second-round knockout.

Martin captured his first national title by defeating veteran boxer Vincent Bautista via a round five corner retirement.

He became the interim WBC Asian Boxing Council Continental bantamweight champion when he defeated Artid Bamrungauea of Thailand on December 23, 2017.

Martin battles Hashimu Zuberi of Tanzania on April 28, 2018, beating the Tanzanian by technical knockout in Round 2, Martin won the vacant World Boxing Organisation Oriental Youth bantamweight title.

Martin then fought the rough Indonesian in George Lumoly for the vacant WBA Asia bantamweight title in June 2018, Martin KO'ed Lumoly in Round 3 of 12.

On August 6, 2018, Martin defeated Huerban Qiatehe of China by RTD, Qiatehe was battered from the first round with heavy punches that pushed the Chinese to retire from his corner in round 6, retaining his WBO Oriental Youth bantamweight title.

A couple of months later, Martin defended his WBA Asia bantamweight crown by defeating Korean boxer Moon Chul Suh via a knockout in the fourth round.

On 16 February 2019, Martin defeated Thai boxer Petchchorhae Kokietgym in his first fight outside of his hometown, the Ifugao province, via a round three corner retirement. Following the bout, he defeated another Thai boxer in Yutthichai Wannawong by technical knockout in the first round.

Three months later, Martin won the PBF bantamweight title for the second time after defeating fellow Filipino boxer Benezer Alolod by technical knockout in round 7. Following the bout, Martin defended his crown as he defeated Philip Luis Cuerdo by technical knockout in the third round.

=== Super Bantamweight division ===
(UKC): Tiger 2022 GAB super bantamweight championship bout between reigning champion Carl Jammes Martin (right) and Ronnie Baldonado (left) weigh-in.

Almost a year of being sidelined due to the COVID-19 pandemic, Martin moved up one division to super bantamweight and defeated Richard Rosales via a unanimous decision. A couple of months later, he defeated Joe Tejones by knockout in the fifth round.

May 12, 2021 Martin defeated the veteran Mark Anthony Geraldo via unanimous decision (117–111, 115–113, 115–113) to win the Philippine super bantamweight championship.

Three months later, Martin defeated Ronnie Baldonado via an eleventh-round technical knockout and captured the Philippine Games & Amusements Board and the vacant WBA Asia super bantamweight titles.

On 30 July 2022, Martin defended his WBA Asia super bantamweight crown by defeating Tanzanian boxer Charles Tondo via a unanimous decision.

On December 2, 2023, SanMan Boxing announced that Martin would compete against Thai boxer, Chaiwat Buatkrathok for the vacant WBO Global super bantamweight title, previously held by John Riel Casimero, the bout is set on December 18, 2023, at the Elorde Grand Ballroom. Jammes would eventually emerge victorious, making him the new WBO Global super bantamweight champion.

A day before the bout with Buatkrathok, Philstar.com and Manila Bulletin would announce the signing of Martin with MP Promotions as Manny Pacquiao sent a warm welcome to Martin to the MP Promotions, Martin would also be declared to have signed with the PBC and TGB promotions, this would later be further supported and fully declared as GMA Network reported about his signing with the PBC Promotion with a picture of him holding a contract just hours before the match against Buatkrathok, after the winning the vacant WBO Global title against Chaiwat Buatkrathok, MP Promotion's president, Sean Gibbons could be seen celebrating with Martin.

On September 7, 2024, Martin defeated Mexican boxer Anthony Jiménez Salas in Culiacán, via knockout in the second round. It marked his first fight outside of the Philippines. On December 7, 2024, at the Evolution Club in Tijuana, he defeated Ruben Tostado Garcia via a fifth-round technical knockout, winning his 25th consecutive match in a row. In May 2025, Martin fought in Las Vegas for the first time, defeating Francisco Pedroza Portillo via unanimous decision to win his 26th straight match.

==== Martin vs. Dipaen ====
===== Thrilla in Manila: 50th Anniversary =====
On October 29, 2025, at the Araneta Coliseum, Martin defeating former title challenger Aran Dipaen of Bangkok, Thailand on a hard-fought ten round bout decision. Martin was sent down to the canvas in the third round with a right hand by Dipaen. However, replays showed the fall was more on a balance issue nevertheless referee ruled it as a knockdown. Still Martin continued to apply pressure on the front foot, scoring a knockdown on his own even via glancing uppercut at the eight round after the final round of the match official judges scored: 97–92, 98–90, 98–91 and declared Martin as the victor via unanimous decision.

=== Featherweight division ===
==== Martin vs. Picasso ====
After an impressive third-round KO win against Carlo Demecillo at Taguig, Philippines on May 16, 2026, Martin challenged David Picasso for WBC Silver featherweight title as part of the Riyadh Season's "Mexico vs. The World" event at Kingdom Arena in Riyadh, Saudi Arabia, on October 31, 2026. Despite being the heavy underdog, Martin manage to overcome a seventh-round knockdown and won a 10-round fight by split decision with the judges having it 95–94, 94–95, 96–93. This win marked Martin's 29th victory in his career, with 21 of those coming by knockout.

== Professional boxing record ==
29 fights	29 wins	0 losses
By knockout	21	0
By decision	8	0
Draws	0	

No.	Result	Record	Opponent	Type	Round, time	Date	Location	Notes
29	Win	29–0	David Picasso	SD	10	31 Oct 2026	Kingdom Arena, Riyadh, Saudi Arabia	Won WBC Silver featherweight title
28	Win	28–0	Carlo Demecillo	KO	3 (10), 1:34	16 May 2026	Bonifacio Naval Station Covered Court, Taguig, Philippines	
27	Win	27–0	Aran Dipaen	UD	10	29 Oct 2025	Araneta Coliseum, Quezon City, Philippines	
26	Win	26–0	Francisco Pedroza Portillo	UD	8	31 May 2025	Michelob Ultra Arena, Paradise, Nevada, U.S.	
25	Win	25–0	Ruben Tostado Garcia	TKO	5 (10), 1:33	7 Dec 2024	Evolution Club, Tijuana, Mexico	
24	Win	24–0	Anthony Jiménez Salas	TKO	2 (10), 1:54	7 Sep 2024	Culiacán, Sinaloa, Mexico	
23	Win	23–0	Chaiwat Buatkrathok	TKO	6 (12), 0:32	18 Dec 2023	Elorde Sports Complex, Parañaque, Philippines	Won vacant WBO Global super bantamweight title
22	Win	22–0	Oscar Duge	UD	10	19 Aug 2023	Elorde Sports Complex, Parañaque, Philippines	
21	Win	21–0	Komgrich Nantapech	KO	2 (10), 2:36	17 Dec 2022	CCDC Gym, Barangay Poblacion, La Trinidad, Philippines	Won vacant IBF Pan Pacific super bantamweight title
20	Win	20–0	Charles Tondo	UD	12	30 Jul 2022	SM City, San Lazaro, Manila, Philippines	Retained WBA Asia super bantamweight title
19	Win	19–0	Ronnie Baldonado	TKO	11 (12), 1:04	12 Mar 2022	Elorde Sports Complex, Parañaque, Philippines	Retained GAB super bantamweight title; Won vacant WBA Asia super bantamweight title
18	Win	18–0	Mark Anthony Geraldo	UD	12	4 Dec 2021	Elorde Sports Complex, Parañaque, Philippines	Won GAB super bantamweight title
17	Win	17–0	Joe Tejones	KO	5 (10), 1:48	20 Feb 2021	Biñan Football Stadium, Biñan, Philippines	
16	Win	16–0	Richard Rosales	UD	10	18 Dec 2020	IPI Compound, Mandaue, Philippines	
15	Win	15–0	Philip Luis Cuerdo	TKO	3 (10), 1:04	21 Dec 2019	Manila Arena, Manila, Philippines	Retained PBF bantamweight title
14	Win	14–0	Benezer Alolod	TKO	7 (10), 1:31	20 Sep 2019	Mandaluyong City Hall Grounds, Mandaluyong, Philippines	Won PBF bantamweight title
13	Win	13–0	Yutthichai Wannawong	TKO	1 (10), 2:51	10 Jun 2019	TV5 Studio, Quezon City, Philippines	
12	Win	12–0	Petchchorhae Kokietgym	RTD	3 (10), 3:00	16 Mar 2019	Midas Hotel and Casino, Pasay, Philippines	
11	Win	11–0	Moon Chul Suh	TKO	4 (12), 1:58	27 Oct 2018	Don Bosco High School Gym, Lagawe, Philippines	Retained WBA Asia bantamweight title
10	Win	10–0	Huerban Qiatehe	RTD	6 (10), 3:00	6 Aug 2018	Plaza Bayombong, Bayombong, Philippines	Retained WBO Oriental Youth bantamweight title
9	Win	9–0	George Lumoly	KO	3 (12), 0:22	21 Jun 2018	Don Bosco High School Gym, Lagawe, Philippines	Won vacant WBA Asia bantamweight title
8	Win	8–0	Hashimu Zuberi	TKO	2 (10), 2:40	28 Apr 2018	Lagawe Central School Open Gym, Lagawe, Philippines	Won vacant WBO Oriental Youth bantamweight title
7	Win	7–0	Artid Bamrungauea	KO	2 (10), 1:54	23 Dec 2017	DepEd Gymnasium, Lagawe, Philippines	Won interim WBC-ABCO Continental bantamweight title
6	Win	6–0	Vincent Bautista	RTD	5 (10), 3:00	28 Oct 2017	DepEd Gymnasium, Lagawe, Philippines	Won interim PBF bantamweight title
5	Win	5–0	Jerry Mae Villagracia	KO	2 (8), 2:55	1 Aug 2017	Banaue Gymnasium, Banaue, Philippines	
4	Win	4–0	Jason Buenaobra	UD	8	19 Apr 2017	Bonifacio Naval Station, Taguig, Philippines	Won vacant LuzProBA bantamweight title
3	Win	3–0	Manny Mamacquiao	TKO	5 (6), 2:52	1 Oct 2016	Lagawe Gym, Lagawe, Philippines	
2	Win	2–0	Noel Guliman	TKO	2 (6), 2:08	7 May 2016	Lagawe Central School Open Gym, Lagawe, Philippines	
1	Win	1–0	Jayar Omac	RTD	2 (4), 3:00	5 Mar 2016	Banaue Gymnasium, Banaue, Philippines	

== Titles in boxing ==
=== Regional titles ===
- Interim WBC-ABCO Continental bantamweight title (118 lbs)
- WBO Oriental Youth bantamweight title (118 lbs)
- WBA Asia bantamweight title (118 lbs)
- WBA Asia super bantamweight title (122 lbs)
- IBF Pan-Pacific super bantamweight title (122 lbs)
- WBO Global super bantamweight title (122 lbs)
- WBC Silver featherweight title (126 lbs)

=== National titles ===
- LuzProBA bantamweight title (118 lbs)
- Interim PBF bantamweight title (118 lbs)
- PBF bantamweight title (118 lbs)
- GAB super bantamweight title (122 lbs)
