= Lenar Perez =

Cuban boxer (born 1998)

Personal information
- Born: Lenar Perez Fransua; 25 January 1998 (age 28) Holguin, Cuba
- Height: 6 ft 5 in (196 cm)
- Weight: Cruiserweight

Boxing career
- Stance: Orthodox

Boxing record
- Total fights: 14
- Wins: 14
- Win by KO: 14

Lenar Perez (born 1998) is a Cuban professional boxer. He currently competes in the cruiserweight division.

== Amateur career ==
Perez was a two time u19 Cuban national champion while coming third in the 2017 Cuban Championships.

== Professional career ==
Perez faced the first unbeaten opponent of his career when he fought 8-0 Russian Rashid Kodzoev at the REN TV Studio in Moscow. Perez stopped Kodzoev in the fourth round meaning his knockout streak continued.

=== Perez vs Brito ===
Perez claimed the first title of his career after he destroyed previously unbeaten Venezuelan Rosmen Brito in just one round. With the win, Perez claimed the WBA Asia Middle-East Cruiserweight title.

=== Perez vs Egorov ===
Perez is currently scheduled for a huge step up against former WBA cruiserweight world title challenger Aleksei Egorov. The fight will take place on April 27 in Banja Luka, Bosnia & Herzegovina.

== Professional boxing record ==
14 fights	14 wins	0 losses
By knockout	14	0

No.	Result	Record	Opponent	Type	Round, time	Date	Location	Notes
14	Win	14–0	(Nigeria) Monyasahu Muritador	TKO	8 (8), 2:11	22 Jan 2025	Krasnodar, Russia	
13	Win	13–0	(Venezuela) Rosmen Brito	KO	1 (10), 2:53	28 Sep 2024	National Gymnastics Arena, Baku, Azerbaijan	
12	Win	12–0	(Czech Republic) Vladimir Reznicek	TKO	5 (8)	2 Dec 2023	Palais des Sports, Marseille, France	
11	Win	11–0	(Colombia) Julio Cesar Calimeno	KO	7 (8)	17 May 2023	Hotel Intercontinental, Paris, France	
10	Win	10–0	(Russia) Rashid Kodzoev	TKO	4 (8), 2:44	25 Feb 2022	REN TV Studio, Moscow, Russia	
9	Win	9–0	(Russia) Igor Vilchitskiy	TKO	4 (6), 2:06	24 Dec 2020	USC Soviet Wings, Moscow, Russia	
8	Win	8–0	(Georgia (country)) Mikheil Khutsishvili	TKO	2 (6)	1 Feb 2020	Hotel Khonobod, Khonobod, Uzbekistan	
7	Win	7–0	(Georgia (country)) Paata Aduashvili	TKO	4 (6), 2:37	15 Dec 2019	Sport Palace "Jar", Tashkent, Uzbekistan	
6	Win	6–0	(Uzbekistan) Akhmad Mamadjanov	RTD	5 (8), 3:00	7 Sep 2019	Markstadt, Chelyabinsk, Russia	
5	Win	5–0	(Georgia (country)) Giorgi Tevdorashvili	TKO	5 (6), 1:26	24 Jul 2019	Korston Club, Moscow, Russia	
4	Win	4–0	(Kyrgyzstan) Shokhrukh Zakirov	RTD	1 (6), 3:00	18 May 2019	Markstadt, Chelyabinsk, Russia	
3	Win	3–0	(Uzbekistan) Sardorjon Amonkeldiev	KO	2 (4), 2:17	10 Apr 2019	(Georgia (country)) Olymp Sports Palace, Tskhinvali, Georgia	
2	Win	2–0	(Russia) Eduard Zaripov	KO	2 (4), 0:44	19 Dec 2018	Markstadt, Chelyabinsk, Russia	
1	Win	1–0	(Russia) Isa Dzhamaldinov	TKO	1 (4), 0:28	22 Nov 2018	(Russia) Restaurant "Zolotaya Korona", Vladikavkaz, RUS	
