= Takuma Inoue =

Japanese boxer (born 1995)

Personal information
- Native name: 井上拓真
- Born: December 26, 1995 (age 30) Zama, Kanagawa, Japan
- Height: 5 ft 4 1/2 in (164 cm)
- Weight: Super flyweight; Bantamweight; Super bantamweight

Boxing career
- Reach: 64 1/2 in (164 cm)
- Stance: Orthodox

Boxing record
- Total fights: 25
- Wins: 23
- Win by KO: 5
- Losses: 2

Takuma Inoue (井上 拓真, Inoue Takuma; born December 26, 1995) is a Japanese professional boxer. He is a two-time bantamweight champion having held the World Boxing Council (WBC) bantamweight title since November 2025, and previously the World Boxing Association (WBA) bantamweight title from 2023 to 2024.

== Professional career ==
Inoue started boxing from a very young age, after watching his brother Naoya win several high school championships. After a promising amateur career, he made his pro debut in 2013 as a light-flyweight against future WBO mini-flyweight world champion Tatsuya Fukuhara. Inoue defeated the much more experienced boxer by unanimous decision. Inoue then moved up to the flyweight division and faced Fahlan Sakkreerin Jr., winning the fight by unanimous decision. After knocking out a debuting Chalerm Kotala, Inoue moved up to super-flyweight and outclassed world title contender Nestor Daniel Narvaes.

Inoue defeated Mark Anthony Geraldo on July 6, 2015, to win the OPBF super-flyweight title. He then successfully defended the belt against Rene Dacquel on December 29, 2015. On September 4, 2016, Inoue defeated Froilan Saludar at the Sky Arena in Japan, before moving up to bantamweight.

Inoue was set to face Marlon Tapales for the WBO bantamweight title in December 2016. However, Inoue was forced to withdraw from the fight after fracturing his hand in training.

Inoue made his return on August 30, 2017, against 4-time world title challenger Hiroyuki Kudaka. He won the back and forth fight by unanimous decision. Inoue then went on to defeat former Japanese champion Kentaro Masuda and Indonesian journeyman Waldo Sabu.

WBC Eliminator

On September 11, 2018, Inoue faced Mark John Yap in a title eliminator for the WBC Bantamweight world championship. The fight was fairly competitive until Inoue floored Yap with a left hook in the fifth. From there, Inoue maintained control for the next three rounds and earned a unanimous decision win.

WBC Interim Championship

Inoue faced Petch Sor Chitpattana for the vacant WBC interim bantamweight title on December 30, 2018, in Ota City General Gymnasium Japan. He won the fight by unanimous decision (117–111, 117–111, 117–111). As the interim champion, Inoue became the mandatory challenger to the winner of the vacant WBC world title fight between Rau'shee Warren and Nordine Oubaali.

WBC Bantamweight Championship

Nordine Oubaali vs Takuma Inoue

Inoue faced two time Olympian Nordine Oubaali for the WBC bantamweight title on November 7, 2019. He lost the fight by unanimous decision (117–110, 120–107, 115–112), marking the first loss of his professional career.

=== Inoue vs. Kurihara ===
On January 14, 2021, Inoue beat Keita Kurihara by technical decision in their 9-round contest. Kurihara was ranked #4 by the IBF at bantamweight at the time. The scorecards were announced as 82–89, 82–89, 81–90 in favor of Inoue.

=== Inoue vs. Wake ===
In his next bout, Inoue beat Shingo Wake by unanimous decision on November 11, 2021. Wake was ranked #13 by the WBO at super-bantamweight. The scorecards read 117–110, 117–110, 117–110 in favor of Inoue.

=== Inoue vs. Furuhashi ===
In his next bout, on June 7, 2022, Inoue fought Gakuya Furuhashi. Inoue won the fight convincingly, winning 119–109, 120–108, 120–108 on the scorecards.

=== Inoue vs. Bornea ===
Inoue faced Jake Bornea on December 13, 2022. The fight was stopped in the 8th round due to a cut opened up on Bornea, with Inoue dominating the action up to that point.

=== Inoue vs. Solis ===
Inoue faced former WBA super-flyweight champion Liborio Solis for the vacant WBA bantamweight title on April 8, 2023. He won the fight and the title by unanimous decision.

=== Inoue vs. Ancajas ===
Inoue made his first WBA bantamweight title defense against former IBF super-flyweight champion Jerwin Ancajas. Inoue won the fight and retained his title by 9th round body-shot knockout.

=== Inoue vs. Ishida ===
Takuma Inoue defeated Sho Ishida via unanimous decision to retain his WBA bantamweight title on May 6, 2024. Despite being knocked down in the first round, Inoue recovered to dominate the fight, using a mix of uppercuts and body shots to outpoint the taller Ishida for the next 11 rounds.

=== Inoue vs. Tsutsumi ===
Inoue defended his WBA bantamweight title against Seiya Tsutsumi at Ariake Arena in Tokyo, Japan on October 13, 2024. He lost the fight by unanimous decision.

=== Inoue vs. Nasukawa ===
Inoue faced Tenshin Nasukawa for the vacant WBC bantamweight title at Toyota Arena in Tokyo, Japan on November 24, 2025. He won the bout by unanimous decision (116–112, 116–112, 117–111).

=== Inoue vs. Ioka ===
Inoue successfully defended his title against Kazuto Ioka at the Tokyo Dome on May 2, 2026, winning via unanimous decision in a fight where he knocked his opponent to the canvas twice.

=== Inoue vs. Nasukawa II ===
On 27 September 2026, Takuma Inoue faced Tenshin Nasukawa in a rematch for the WBC bantamweight title at Toyota Arena Tokyo, Japan. Inoue won by unanimous decision, with judges scoring the bout 116–111, 116–111 and 114–113. Despite being knocked down by Nasukawa in the seventh round, Inoue retained his title, securing his second successful defence.

== Awards ==
Inoue was named the 2015 The Ring magazine Prospect of the Year.

== Personal life ==
He is the younger brother of Naoya Inoue, and the younger cousin of Koki Inoue.

== Professional boxing record ==
25 fights	23 wins	2 losses
By knockout	5	0
By decision	18	2

No.	Result	Record	Opponent	Type	Round, time	Date	Location	Notes
25	Win	23–2	Tenshin Nasukawa	UD	12	27 Sep 2026	Toyota Arena Tokyo, Tokyo, Japan	Retained WBC bantamweight title
24	Win	22–2	Kazuto Ioka	UD	12	2 May 2026	Tokyo Dome, Tokyo, Japan	Retained WBC bantamweight title
23	Win	21–2	Tenshin Nasukawa	UD	12	Nov 24, 2025	Toyota Arena Tokyo, Tokyo, Japan	Won vacant WBC bantamweight title
22	Loss	20–2	Seiya Tsutsumi	UD	12	Oct 13, 2024	Ariake Arena, Tokyo, Japan	Lost WBA bantamweight title
21	Win	20–1	Shō Ishida	UD	12	May 6, 2024	Tokyo Dome, Tokyo, Japan	Retained WBA bantamweight title
20	Win	19–1	Jerwin Ancajas	KO	9 (12), 0:44	Feb 24, 2024	Ryōgoku Kokugikan, Tokyo, Japan	Retained WBA bantamweight title
19	Win	18–1	Liborio Solís	UD	12	Apr 8, 2023	Ariake Arena, Tokyo, Japan	Won vacant WBA bantamweight title
18	Win	17–1	Jake Bornea	TKO	8 (10), 2:48	Dec 13, 2022	Ariake Arena, Tokyo, Japan	
17	Win	16–1	Gakuya Furuhashi	UD	12	Jun 7, 2022	Super Arena, Saitama, Japan	Retained WBO Asia Pacific super-bantamweight title; Won Japanese super-bantamweight title
16	Win	15–1	Shingo Wake	UD	12	Nov 11, 2021	Korakuen Hall, Tokyo, Japan	Won vacant WBO Asia Pacific super-bantamweight title
15	Win	14–1	Keita Kurihara	TD	9 (12), 2:25	Jan 14, 2021	Korakuen Hall, Tokyo, Japan	Won OPBF bantamweight title
14	Loss	13–1	Nordine Oubaali	UD	12	Nov 7, 2019	Super Arena, Saitama, Japan	For WBC bantamweight title
13	Win	13–0	Petch Sor Chitpattana	UD	12	Dec 30, 2018	Ota City General Gymnasium, Tokyo, Japan	Won vacant WBC interim bantamweight title
12	Win	12–0	Mark John Yap	UD	12	Sep 11, 2018	Korakuen Hall, Tokyo, Japan	
11	Win	11–0	Waldo Sabu	KO	1 (10), 2:14	May 25, 2018	Ota City General Gymnasium, Tokyo, Japan	
10	Win	10–0	Kentaro Masuda	UD	10	Dec 30, 2017	Cultural Gymnasium, Yokohama, Japan	
9	Win	9–0	Hiroyuki Hisataka	UD	10	Aug 30, 2017	Korakuen Hall, Tokyo, Japan	
8	Win	8–0	Froilan Saludar	UD	10	Sep 4, 2016	Sky Arena, Zama, Japan	
7	Win	7–0	Afrizal Tamboresi	TKO	2 (12), 1:46	May 8, 2016	Ariake Coliseum, Tokyo, Japan	Retained OPBF super-flyweight title
6	Win	6–0	Rene Dacquel	UD	12	Dec 29, 2015	Ariake Coliseum, Tokyo, Japan	Retained OPBF super-flyweight title
5	Win	5–0	Mark Anthony Geraldo	UD	12	Jul 6, 2015	Korakuen Hall, Tokyo, Japan	Won vacant OPBF super-flyweight title
4	Win	4–0	Nestor Daniel Narvaes	UD	8	Dec 30, 2014	Metropolitan Gymnasium, Tokyo, Japan	
3	Win	3–0	Chalerm Kotala	KO	2 (8), 0:51	Sep 5, 2014	Yoyogi National Gymnasium, Tokyo, Japan	
2	Win	2–0	Teeraphong Utaida	UD	8	Apr 6, 2014	Ota City General Gymnasium, Tokyo, Japan	
1	Win	1–0	Tatsuya Fukuhara	UD	6	Dec 6, 2013	Ryōgoku Kokugikan, Tokyo, Japan	

== See also ==
- List of male boxers
- Notable boxing families
- Boxing in Japan
- List of Japanese boxing world champions
- List of world bantamweight boxing champions

Sporting positions
Regional boxing titles
Vacant Title last held by Ryo Matsumoto	OPBF super-flyweight champion July 6, 2015 – May 2016; Vacated	Vacant Title next held by Rene Dacquel; Promoted
Preceded by Keita Kurihara	OPBF bantamweight champion January 14, 2021 – July 2021; Vacated	Vacant Title next held by Kazuki Nakajima
Vacant Title last held by Jhunriel Ramonal	WBO Asia Pacific super-bantamweight champion November 11, 2021 – November 2022; Vacated	Vacant Title next held by Kazuki Nakajima
Preceded by Gakuya Furuhashi	Japanese super-bantamweight champion June 7 – October 24, 2022; Vacated	Vacant Title next held by Gakuya Furuhashi
World boxing titles
Vacant Title last held by Sirimongkol Singmanasak	WBC bantamweight champion Interim title December 30, 2018 – November 7, 2019; Lost bid for full title	Vacant Title next held by Reymart Gaballo
Vacant Title last held by Guillermo Rigondeaux as Regular champion	WBA bantamweight champion April 8, 2023 – October 13, 2024	Succeeded by Seiya Tsutsumi
Vacant Title last held by Junto Nakatani	WBC bantamweight champion November 24, 2025 – present	Incumbent
Awards
Previous: Anthony Joshua	The Ring Prospect of the Year; 2015	Next: Erickson Lubin
