= Panomroonglek Kratingdaenggym =

Thai former professional Muay Thai fighter and boxer

Panomroonglek Kiatmuu9
- Born: Boonsom Iamsiri; March 16, 1984 (age 42); Prakhon Chai, Buriram, Thailand
- Native name: บุญสม เอี่ยมสิริ
- Other names: Panomrunglek Gaiyanghadaogym (พนมรุ้งเล็ก ไก่ย่างห้าดาวยิม)
- Nickname: Fist of the Stone Castle (ไอ้หมัดปราสาทหิน); Ultimate Fighter of Two Styles (ยอดมวยสองแบบ)
- Height: 161 cm (5 ft 3 in)
- Division: Flyweight; Super Flyweight; Bantamweight
- Style: Muay Thai (Muay Femur); Boxing
- Stance: Southpaw
- Team: Kiatmuu9 Gym; Diamond Boxing Promotions
- Years active: c. 1994–2018

Professional boxing record
- Total: 53
- Wins: 50
- By knockout: 31
- Losses: 3
- By knockout: 2

Other information
- Notable relatives: Petpanomrung Kiatmuu9 (brother)
- Boxing record from BoxRec

Boonsom Iamsiri (Thai: บุญสม เอี่ยมสิริ; born December 17, 1984), known professionally as Panomroonglek Kiatmuu9 or Panomroonglek Kratingdaenggym, (Thai: พนมรุ้งเล็ก เกียรติหมู่9, พนมรุ้งเล็ก กระทิงแดงยิม), is a Thai former professional Muay Thai fighter and boxer. He is a former three-time Lumpinee Stadium champion across two divisions and also challenged for a WBA Bantamweight title in boxing.

== Professional career ==
He started Muay Thai at the age of 10 and has over 200 fights in name "Panomrunglek Kiatmoo 9" (พนมรุ้งเล็ก เกียรติหมู่ 9). In 2005 he won the Flyweight champion of Lumpinee Boxing Stadium, in 2006 the Lumpinee Boxing Stadium fighter of the year, and 2010 won the Junior bantamweight champion of Lumpinee Boxing Stadium. Struggling to find worthy opposition he began splitting his time with boxing. Kratingdaenggym turned professional in August 2004 at Khun Han, Sisaket Province, Thailand. In his debut Kratingdaenggym defeated previously unbeaten Rocky Fuentes on points over six rounds.

On April 7, 2013, he challenge WBA Bantamweight World title with a Japanese holder Kōki Kameda at Bodymaker Colosseum, Osaka, Japan, he appears to have a good punch and is likely to win. But when the scores was announced, he is defeated though opinion journalism that he should be the winner.

After that, he continued to Muay Thai and professional boxing alternately. On September 13, 2017 he boxes against Shingo Wake, a Japanese rising boxer in Super bantamweight division at Edion Arena, Osaka, joins the event with Yukinori Oguni vs. Ryosuke Iwasa and Kosei Tanaka vs. Palangpol CP Freshmart. He appears to be TKO (referee stops contest) in the eighth round.

== Titles and accomplishments ==
=== Muay Thai ===
- Lumpinee Stadium
  - 2003 Lumpinee Stadium Flyweight (112 lbs) Champion
  - 2008 Lumpinee Stadium Super Flyweight (115 lbs) Champion
  - 2010 Lumpinee Stadium Super Flyweight (115 lbs) Champion
- Toyota Marathon
  - 2002 Toyota Marathon Tournament Super Flyweight (115 lbs) Winner
- Omnoi Stadium
  - 2003 13th Isuzu Cup Tournament Winner
- Professional Boxing Association of Thailand (PAT)
  - 2009 Thailand Super Flyweight (115 lbs) Champion

=== Boxing ===
- World Boxing Council
  - 2006 WBC World Youth Flyweight (112 lbs) Champion.
  - 2010 WBC International Silver Flyweight (112 lbs) Champion

== Professional boxing record ==
53 fights	50 wins	3 losses
By knockout	31	2
By decision	19	1

No.	Result	Record	Opponent	Type	Round, time	Date	Location	Notes
53	Loss	50–3	Shingo Wake	KO	8 (8), 2:45	13 Sep 2017	EDION Arena, Osaka, Japan	
52	Win	50–2	Kobilbek Tulabaev	PTS	6	30 Dec 2016	Siam Paradise Entertainment Centre, Bangkok, Thailand	
51	Win	49–2	Frans Damur Palue	TKO	4 (12)	29 Apr 2016	City Hall Ground, Chonburi, Thailand	Retained WBA-PABA bantamweight title
50	Win	48–2	Iwan Sanca	KO	5 (12)	4 Feb 2016	City Hall Ground, Chonburi, Thailand	Retained WBA-PABA bantamweight title
49	Win	47–2	Rasmanudin	TKO	6 (12), 1:47	30 Oct 2015	Sima Thani Hotel, Nakhon Ratchasima, Thailand	Retained WBA-PABA bantamweight title
48	Win	46–2	Arega Yunian	TKO	6 (12), 0:40	2 Jul 2015	City Hall Ground, Nakhon Ratchasima, Thailand	Retained WBA-PABA bantamweight title
47	Win	45–2	Alwi Alhabsyi	KO	3 (6)	24 Apr 2015	Siam Paradise Entertainmeng Centre, Bangkok, Thailand	
46	Win	44–2	Mateo Handig	KO	8 (12)	5 Mar 2025	City Hall Ground, Chonburi, Thailand	Retained WBA-PABA bantamweight title
45	Win	43–2	Edo Anggoro	KO	3 (6)	5 Feb 2015	City Hall Ground, Nakhon Sawan, Thailand	
44	Win	42–2	Samuel Tehuayo	UD	12	26 Dec 2014	11th Inf Reg, Bangkok, Thailand	Retained WBA-PABA bantamweight title
43	Win	41–2	Junior Bajawa	TKO	7 (12)	26 Sep 2014	Sunee Grand Hotel, Uson Ratchathani, Thailand	Won vacant WBA-PABA bantamweight title
42	Win	40–2	Baldir Singh	KO	4 (10)	10 Jun 2014	Siam Paradise Entertainment Centre, Bangkok, Thailand	
41	Win	39–2	Rick Paciones	KO	3 (6)	4 Mar 2014	Suranaree Army Camp Stadium, Nakhon Ratchasima, Thailand	
40	Win	38–2	Vicky Verbian	KO	2 (12)	29 Nov 2013	City Hall Ground, Chonburi, Thailand	
39	Win	37–2	Jemmy Gobel	TKO	2 (6)	31 May 2013	Toyota Office, Kanchanaburi, Thailand	
38	Loss	36–2	Kōki Kameda	SD	12	7 Apr 2013	Bodymaker Colosseum, Osaka, Japan	For WBA (Regular) bantamweight title
37	Win	36–1	Ricky Manufoe	TKO	6 (6), 2:29	26 Oct 2012	Siam Paradise Entertainment Centre, Bangkok, Thailand	
36	Win	35–1	Rollen Del Castillo	KO	3	3 May 2012	Provinicial Hall, Buriram, Thailand	
35	Win	34–1	Koki Eto	UD	12	4 Aug 2011	Central Stadium, Phitsanulok, Thailand	Retained WBC International Silver flyweight title
34	Win	33–1	Jecker Buhawe	UD	12	29 Apr 2011	E-sarn University, Khon Kaen, Thailand	Retained WBC International Silver flyweight title
33	Win	32–1	Dondon Jimenea	UD	12	1 Feb 2011	Ban Kwao, Chaiyaphum, Thailand	Retained WBC International Silver flyweight title
32	Win	31–1	Javier Malulan	TKO	7 (12), 1:24	24 Dec 2010	11th Inf Reg, Bangkok, Thailand	Retained WBC International Silver flyweight title
31	Win	30–1	Marvin Tampus	TD	8 (12)	29 Oct 2010	Thungsimuang, Udon Thani, Thailand	Won vacant WBC International Silver flyweight title; Unanimous TD
30	Win	29–1	Ego Yohan	KO	3 (6), 0:34	27 Aug 2010	E-sarn University, Khon Kaen, Thailand	
29	Loss	28–1	Hiroyuki Kudaka	TKO	8 (12), 1:26	4 May 2010	Surat Thani, Surat Thani Province, Thailand	For inaugural WBC International Silver flyweight title
28	Win	28–0	Ego Yohan	TKO	2 (6)	15 Jan 2010	Phaisali, Nakhon Sawan Thailand	
27	Win	27–0	Adi Nukung	PTS	6	2 Oct 2009	Provincial School, Nakhon Phanom, Thailand	
26	Win	26–0	Danny Sutton	PTS	6	29 May 2009	Bangla Stadium, Patong, Thailand	
25	Win	25–0	Roland Latuni	PTS	6	25 Feb 2009	Ayutthaya Park, Ayutthaya, Thailand	
24	Win	24–0	Danny Sutton	KO	4 (10)	3 Dec 2008	Tha Tako, Nakhon Sawan, Thailand	
23	Win	23–0	Ali Hosini	UD	10	31 Oct 2008	Chokchai Four, Bangkok, Thailand	
22	Win	22–0	John Cut Siregar	KO	4 (6)	30 May 2008	Suan Lum Night Bazaar Ratchadaphisek, Bangkok, Thailand	
21	Win	21–0	Irfan Ogah	UD	10	29 Feb 2008	Chok Chai 4, Bangkok, Thailand	Retained WBC Youth flyweight title
20	Win	20–0	Dolfi Lolaru	KO	4 (10)	4 Dec 2007	Bungboraphet, Nakhon Sawan, Thailand	Retained WBC Youth flyweight title
19	Win	19–0	Charles Delada	TKO	6 (10)	24 Aug 2007	Ubon Ratchathani, Ubon Ratchathani Province, Thailand	Retained WBC Youth flyweight title
18	Win	18–0	Hiroyuki Kudaka	UD	10	25 May 2007	Por Kungpao, Bangkok, Thailand	Retained WBC Youth flyweight title
17	Win	17–0	Richard Garcia	KO	5 (10)	23 Feb 2007	Chokchai 4 Center, Bangkok, Thailand	Retained WBC Youth flyweight title
16	Win	16–0	Pingping Tepura	KO	6 (10)	29 Dec 2006	Saraburi, Saraburi Province, Thailand	Retained WBC Youth flyweight title
15	Win	15–0	Lito Sisnorio	UD	10	5 Oct 2006	Wat Ban Plee Yai Klang, Samut Prakan, Thailand	Won WBC Youth flyweight title
14	Win	14–0	Orlan Enriquez	UD	12	30 Jun 2006	Siam Paragon Center, Bangkok, Thailand	Retained WBC-ABCO flyweight title
13	Win	13–0	Jun Eraham	UD	12	1 May 2006	11th Inf Reg, Bangkok, Thailand	Retained WBC-ABCO flyweight title
12	Win	12–0	Rene Banares	TKO	3 (12), 1:22	24 Feb 2006	Por Kungpao Restaurant, Bangkok, Thailand	Retained WBC-ABCO flyweight title
11	Win	11–0	Celso Danggod	UD	12	19 Jan 2006	Maejo University, Chiang Mai, Thailand	Retained WBC-ABCO flyweight title
10	Win	10–0	Liu Yong Jun	TKO	8 (12)	9 Nov 2005	Thabor District, Nong Khai, Thailand	Retained WBC-ABCO flyweight title
9	Win	9–0	Chris Dujali	UD	6	10 Oct 2005	Channel 7 Studios, Bangkok, Thailand	
8	Win	8–0	Cheng Bin Yu	KO	5 (12), 1:21	26 Aug 2005	Saraburi, Saraburi Province, Thailand	Retained WBC-ABCO flyweight title
7	Win	7–0	Bernardo Oclos	UD	12	24 Jun 2005	Por Kungpao, Bangkok, Thailand	Retained WBC-ABCO flyweight title
6	Win	6–0	Alfred Nagal	KO	7 (12)	29 Apr 2005	Petchpaiboon Market, Phetchaburi, Thailand	Retained WBC-ABCO flyweight title
5	Win	5–0	Danny Linasa	KO	6 (10)	29 Jan 2005	Channel 7 Studios, Bangkok, Thailand	
4	Win	4–0	Allan Ranada	KO	7 (12), 2:17	31 Dec 2004	Por Kungpao Restaurant, Bangkok, Thailand	Retained WBC-ABCO flyweight title
3	Win	3–0	Leo Escobido	KO	4 (12)	26 Nov 2004	Chiang Saen, Chiang Rai Province, Thailand	Retained WBC-ABCO flyweight title
2	Win	2–0	Sompong Surakan	TKO	6 (10)	8 Oct 2004	Arcadia Hilton Hotel, Phuket, Thailand	Won WBC-ABCO flyweight title
1	Win	1–0	Rocky Fuentes	UD	6	27 Aug 2004	Khukhan, Sisaket, Thailand	

== Muay Thai record ==
Muay Thai record
Date	Result	Opponent	Event	Location	Method	Round	Time
2018-04-27	Loss	(Thailand) Moradokphet PetchyindeeAcdamey	True4U Muaymunwansuk Fight	Thailand	Decision	5	3:00
2018-03-16	Win	(Thailand) VIP Phetmahaprom	True4U Muaymunwansuk Fight	Thailand	Decision	5	3:00
2018-02-02	Loss	(Thailand) Kundiew Payapkumpan	True4U Muaymunwansuk Fight	Thailand	Decision	5	3:00
2017-07-23	Win	(Thailand) Thepnimit Sitmonchai	Toyota Petchyindee Promotion	Thailand	Decision	5	3:00
2017-07-23	Loss	(Thailand) Kengkla Por.Pekko	Rangsit Boxing Stadium	Thailand	Decision	5	3:00
2017-05-29	Win	(Thailand) Tomas Sor.Chaijarern	Rajadamnern Stadium	Bangkok, Thailand	Decision	5	3:00
2017-03-29	Loss	(Thailand) Kaotam Lookprabaht	Rajadamnern Stadium	Bangkok, Thailand	Decision	5	3:00
2017-03-03	Loss	(Thailand) Saksit Tor. Piamsabpetriew	Rangsit Boxing Stadium	Thailand	Decision	5	3:00
2017-02-22	Loss	(Thailand) Yardfa R-Airline	Rajadamnern Stadium	Bangkok, Thailand	Decision	5	3:00
2017-01-27	Loss	(Thailand) Yardfa R-Airline		Kanchanaburi, Thailand	Decision	5	3:00
2016-12-07	Win	(Thailand) Tomas Sor.Chaijarern		Kanchanaburi, Thailand	Decision	5	3:00
2016-09-16	Loss	(Thailand) Petchsongphak Sitjaroensap	Rangsit Boxing Stadium	Thailand	Decision	5	3:00
2016-07-10	Loss	(Thailand) Manasak Pinsinchai	Rajadamnern Stadium	Bangkok, Thailand	Decision	5	3:00
2016-06-19	Win	(Thailand) Phetsila Chor.Sampinong	Rangsit Boxing Stadium	Thailand	Decision	5	3:00
2016-03-17	Win	(Thailand) Saksit Tor. Piamsabpetriew	Rajadamnern Stadium	Bangkok, Thailand	Decision	5	3:00
2015-12-25	Loss	(Thailand) Manasak Pinsinchai	Lumpinee Stadium	Bangkok, Thailand	Decision	5	3:00
2015-11-20	Loss	(Thailand) Manasak Pinsinchai	Lumpinee Stadium	Bangkok, Thailand	Decision	5	3:00
2015-11-05	Loss	(Thailand) Kengkart Por.Pekko	Rajadamnern Stadium	Bangkok, Thailand	Decision	5	3:00
2015-09-15	Win	(Thailand) Ployvitaya Moosaphanmai	Lumpinee Stadium	Bangkok, Thailand	Decision	5	3:00
2015-08-24	Win	(Thailand) Saksit Tor. Piamsabpetriew	Rajadamnern Stadium	Bangkok, Thailand	Decision	5	3:00
2015-05-17	Loss	(Thailand) Kwanphet Sor.Suwanpakdee	Rangsit Boxing Stadium	Thailand	Decision	5	3:00
2014-11-25	Loss	(Thailand) Saksit Tor. Piamsabpetriew	Lumpinee Stadium	Bangkok, Thailand	Decision	5	3:00
2014-08-06	Win	(Thailand) Yodmongkol Muangsima	Rajadamnern Stadium	Bangkok, Thailand	Decision	5	3:00
2014-07-01	Loss	(Thailand) Wanchana Aor Boonchuy	Lumpinee Stadium	Bangkok, Thailand	Decision	5	3:00
2014-05-09	Loss	(Thailand) Petchtaae Petchyindee Academy	Lumpinee Stadium	Bangkok, Thailand	Decision	5	3:00
2014-04-01	Loss	(Thailand) Petchtaae Petchyindee Academy	Lumpinee Stadium	Bangkok, Thailand	Decision	5	3:00
2013-10-22	Win	(Thailand) Wanchana Or Boonchuay	Lumpinee Stadium	Bangkok, Thailand	Decision	5	3:00
2013-07-05	Win	(Thailand) Kwanphet Sor.Suwanpakdee	Lumpinee Stadium	Bangkok, Thailand	Decision	5	3:00
2013-06-28	Loss	(Thailand) Yangtone Yodasawintransport	Lumpinee Stadium	Thailand	TKO (Knees to the Body)	4	
2012-12-08	Win	(Thailand) Chatchainoi Sitbenjama	Omnoi Stadium	Samut Sakhon, Thailand	Decision	5	3:00
2012-11		(Thailand) Yangtone Yodasawintransport	Lumpinee Stadium	Bangkok, Thailand			
2012-09-26	Loss	(Thailand) Ekmongkol Gaiyanghaadao	Lumpinee Stadium	Bangkok, Thailand	Decision	5	3:00
2012-08-21	Win	(Thailand) Saengmorakot Tor Manothammaraksa	Lumpinee Stadium	Bangkok, Thailand	Decision	5	3:00
2012-07-11	Loss	(Thailand) Songkom Nayoksanya	Lumpinee Stadium	Bangkok, Thailand	Decision	5	3:00
2012	Win	(Thailand) Nattachai Pran26	Lumpinee Stadium	Bangkok, Thailand	Decision	5	3:00
2012-02-24	Win	(Thailand) Phetmorakot Petchyindee Academy	Lumpinee Stadium	Bangkok, Thailand	Decision	5	3:00
2011-11-09	Loss	(Thailand) Phetmorakot Petchyindee Academy	Rajadamnern Stadium	Bangkok, Thailand	Decision	5	3:00
2011-10-07	Win	(Thailand) Pompurn Por Aowtaleebangsen	Lumpinee Stadium	Bangkok, Thailand	Decision	5	3:00
2011-09-13	Draw	(Thailand) Dechsakda Sitsongpeenong	Lumpinee Stadium	Bangkok, Thailand	Decision	5	3:00
?	Win	(Thailand) Nongbeer Choknamwong	Lumpinee Stadium	Bangkok, Thailand	Decision	5	3:00
2010-10-05	Loss	(Thailand) Nuangthep Eminentair	Lumpinee Stadium	Bangkok, Thailand	Decision	5	3:00
For the vacant WMC World Super Flyweight (115 lbs) title and loses the Lumpinee Stadium Super Flyweight (115 lbs) title.
2010-03-05	Win	(Thailand) Ponsawan Lookprabath	Lumpinee Stadium	Bangkok, Thailand			
Wins the Lumpinee Stadium Super Flyweight (115 lbs) title.
2009-12-08	Win	(Thailand) Chatchainoi Sor.Prabsochock	Lumpinee Stadium	Bangkok, Thailand	Decision	5	3:00
For the Thailand Bantamweight (118 lbs) title.
2009-10-22	Loss	(Thailand) Chatchai Sor Thanayong	Toyota Marathon, Quarter Finals	Thailand	Decision	5	3:00
2009-08-07	Loss	(Thailand) Chartchainoi Sor.Prabsochock	Lumpinee Stadium	Bangkok, Thailand	Decision	5	3:00
2008-09-19	Win	(Thailand) Nongbeer Choknamwong	Lumpinee Stadium	Bangkok, Thailand	Decision	5	3:00
2008-07-04	Win	(Thailand) Nongnan Kiatpratum	Lumpinee Stadium	Bangkok, Thailand	Decision	5	3:00
2008-03-28	Win	(Thailand) Pongsiri P.K.Saenchaimuaythaigym	Lumpinee Stadium	Bangkok, Thailand	Decision	5	3:00
Wins the vacant Lumpinee Stadium Super Flyweight (115 lbs) title.
2007-07-06	Loss	(Thailand) Petchboonchu FA Group	Lumpinee Stadium	Thailand	Decision	5	3:00
2007-01-30	Win	(Thailand) Norasing Lukbanyai	Lumpinee Stadium	Bangkok, Thailand	Decision	5	3:00
2004-07-18	Win	(Thailand) Thongchai Tor. Silachai		Thailand	Decision	5	3:00
2004-06-04	Win	(Thailand) Wanphichai Kor Bangkruai	Lumpinee Stadium	Bangkok, Thailand	Decision	5	3:00
2004-	Win	(Thailand) Pinsiam Sor.Amnuaysirichoke	Lumpinee Stadium	Bangkok, Thailand	Decision	5	3:00
2004-03-02	Win	(Thailand) Wisanlek Sor.Tossapon	Lumpinee Stadium	Bangkok, Thailand	Decision	5	3:00
2004-02-06	Win	(Thailand) Namsuk Phetsupaphan	Lumpinee Stadium	Bangkok, Thailand	Decision	5	3:00
2003-12-26	Win	(Thailand) Sitthichai Kiyarat	Lumpinee Stadium	Bangkok, Thailand	Decision	5	3:00
2003-11-21	Win	(Thailand) Sangyuth Wor.Soonthornnon	Lumpinee Stadium	Bangkok, Thailand	Decision	5	3:00
2003-10-14	Win	(Thailand) Namsuk Phetsupaphan	Lumpinee Stadium	Bangkok, Thailand	Decision	5	3:00
2003-09-14	Win	(Thailand) Namsuk Phetsupaphan	Lumpinee Stadium	Bangkok, Thailand	Decision	5	3:00
Wins the Lumpinee Stadium Flyweight (112 lbs) title.
2003-08-26	Win	(Thailand) Dawprasuk Sasiprapa	Lumpinee Stadium	Bangkok, Thailand	Decision	5	3:00
2003-04-26	Win	(Thailand) Wanwiset Lukbanyai	Isuzu Tournament, Final	Bangkok, Thailand	Decision	5	3:00
Wins the 13th Isuzu Cup Tournament title.
2003-03-15	Draw	(Thailand) Wanwiset Lukbanyai	Isuzu Tournament, Final	Bangkok, Thailand	Decision	5	3:00
2002-07-23	Win	(Thailand) Yandang Sakhomsil	Lumpinee Stadium	Bangkok, Thailand	Decision	5	3:00
2002-06-11	Win	(Thailand) Dejdamrong Sor Amnuaysirichoke	Lumpinee Stadium	Bangkok, Thailand	Decision	5	3:00
2002-05-18	Win	(Thailand) Dejdamrong Sor Amnuaysirichoke	Lumpinee Stadium	Bangkok, Thailand	Decision	5	3:00
2002-03-10	Win	(Thailand) Yai Sit Samerchai		Buriram province, Thailand	Decision	5	3:00
2000-12-30	Loss	(Thailand) Rungruanglek Lukprabat	Omnoi Stadium	Samut Sakhon, Thailand	Decision	5	3:00
Legend: Win Loss Draw/No contest Notes
