= Keita Kurihara =

Japanese boxer (born 1993)

Personal information
- Native name: 栗原慶太
- Nickname: Slugger
- Born: January 10, 1993 (age 33) Tokyo, Japan
- Height: 1.72 m (5 ft 8 in)
- Weight: Flyweight; Super-flyweight; Bantamweight

Boxing career
- Stance: Orthodox

Boxing record
- Total fights: 31
- Wins: 21
- Win by KO: 18
- Losses: 9
- Draws: 1

Keita Kurihara (栗原慶太, Kurihara Keita; born 10 January 1993) is a Japanese professional boxer who held the OPBF bantamweight title four times.

== Professional career ==
=== Early career ===
Kurihara debuted on 6 April 2011 in the flyweight division against Yoshiyuki Shimizu at the famous Korakuen Hall, Kurihara stopped his opponent with four seconds left in the first round, after the successful debut, Kurihara headed to a rocky path achieving a record of 3–4 before having his redemption with a six winning streak.

After earning himself a streak he faced Hiroaki Teshigawara on 19 June 2017 in Tokyo, Japan to mark Kurihara's sixth bantamweight bout, where Kurihara's winning streak was broken with a fifth round TKO. On 1 December 2017, Kurihara had an impressive comeback fight against undefeated Filipino Ryan Lumacad with a second-round knockout statement.

=== Kurihara vs. Kobayashi ===
After composing a record 12–5, Kurihara faced compatriot regional contender Yuki Strong Kobayashi on 24 December 2018 in Sumiyoshi Ward Center, Osaka, Japan for the vacant OPBF bantamweight championship, Kurihara prevailed with a tight 113–111 unanimous decision victory.

=== Kurihara vs. Parrenas ===
On 10 May 2019, Cadiz City-native one-time world title challenger Warlito Parrenas challenged Kurihara on his first defence of the OPBF belt, Kurihara earned himself an impressive first-round knockout, lasting only 35 seconds.

=== Kurihara vs. Inoue ===
After 425 days of inactivity, certainly due to the Corona virus pandemic, On 14 January 2021, Kurihara was set to make his second defence of the OPBF title against world-title challenger Takuma Inoue in Korakuen Hall, Tokyo, Japan, Kurihara conceived his first loss in nearly four years after Inoue dominated him with a ninth-round unanimous technical decision after Kurihara sustained a cut from clashing of heads.

=== Kurihara vs. Nakajima ===
On 19 October 2021, Kurihara earned a chance to recapture the OPBF belt against the new reigning champion Kazuki Nakajima, Kurihara stopped the previously unbeaten Nakajima in three rounds.

=== Kurihara vs. Oguni ===
In March 2022, it was announced that Kurihara was set to face former IBF super bantamweight champion Yukinori Oguni in a non-titled ten rounds bout on 20 May 2022, in the fourth round of their match, the referee halted the bout due to a severe cut on Oguni's right eyebrow caused by an accidental headbutt, due to a rule in boxing, despite Oguni leading 30–27 twice and 29–28 in the scorecards, the bout was declared a draw.

=== Kurihara vs. Chiba I ===
On 22 September 2022 in Korakuen Hall, Kurihara defended his OPBF title against compatriot Kai Chiba, Kurihara conceded his seventh career loss after he was stopped in the 0:50 mark of the very last round.

=== Kurihara vs. Chiba II ===
On 4 March 2023 in the same venue, Kurihara aimed for revenge in wants to reclaim the OPBF title against Kai Chiba, Kurihara succeeded in reacquiring the OPBF gold after he stopped Chiba within two rounds.

=== Kurihara vs. Saludar I ===
On 12 October 2023 at Ariake Arena in Tokyo, Kurihara faced former world-title challenger Froilan Saludar who moved down weight for their match in Kurihara's first defence of the reacquired OPBF bantamweight strap, despite Kurihara being expected to be the winner, Saludar shocked Kurihara in his home turf as Saludar knocked Kurihara twice before stopping him in the one minute mark of the first round.

=== Kurihara vs. Saludar II ===
On 26 January 2024, after three months since their first match, Kurihara and Saludar fought in a rematch to serve as the co-main card of the "Kumbati 16" event, whilst the OPBF, vacant IBF Pan Pacific and IBF Asia bantamweight crowns were on the line, this also marked as Kurihara's first bout outside of Japan, to fight in Cebu City, Philippines, Kurihara avenged his loss and reclaimed the OPBF title whilst also winning the vacant IBF Pan Pacific and Asia bantamweight crowns after Kurihara gave Saludar a hard-fought battle and a knockdown in the fourth round en route to an eight-round knockout victory.

=== Kurihara vs. Portes ===
On 22 July 2024, Kurihara fought against Filipino journeyman Renan Portes in a hard-fought eight-rounder bout whereas Kurihara won via a controversial split decision, Kurihara later disregarded his victory and felt regretful, Kurihara later apologized to his Filipino opponent and stated to the crowd: "I didn't win this fight" and "I was declared the winner, but I believe I lost."

=== Kurihara vs. Llover ===
On 24 March 2025, Kurihara fought the reigning OPBF interim champion, hard-hitting Filipino prospect Kenneth Llover in Korakuen Hall for Kurihara's OPBF absolute title, Kurihara suffered a stunning first-round stoppage loss after the referee put the bout to halt due to barrage of punches that hurt Kurihara.

== Professional boxing record ==
| 31 fights | 21 wins | 9 losses |
|---|---|---|
| By knockout | 18 | 6 |
| By decision | 3 | 3 |
| Draws | 1 | |

| No. | Result | Record | Opponent | Type | Round, time | Date | Location | Notes |
|---|---|---|---|---|---|---|---|---|
| 31 | Win | 21–9–1 | Shori Umezu | TKO | 6 (10), 0:47 | 6 Jun 2026 | Korakuen Hall, Tokyo, Japan | Won Japanese bantamweight title |
| 30 | Win | 20–9–1 | Shunpei Kaneshiro | KO | 5 (8), 3:00 | 17 Sep 2025 | Korakuen Hall, Tokyo, Japan | |
| 29 | Loss | 19–9–1 | Kenneth Llover | TKO | 1 (12), 2:33 | 24 Mar 2025 | Korakuen Hall, Tokyo, Japan | Lost OPBF bantamweight title |
| 28 | Win | 19–8–1 | Renan Portes | SD | 8 | 22 Jul 2024 | Korakuen Hall, Tokyo, Japan | |
| 27 | Win | 18–8–1 | Froilan Saludar | KO | 8 (12), 1:13 | 26 Jan 2024 | Nustar Resort and Casino, Cebu City, Philippines | Won OPBF, vacant IBF Pan Pacific and IBF Asia bantamweight titles |
| 26 | Loss | 17–8–1 | Froilan Saludar | TKO | 1 (12), 1:00 | 12 Oct 2023 | Ariake Arena, Tokyo, Japan | Lost OPBF bantamweight title |
| 25 | Win | 17–7–1 | Kai Chiba | TKO | 2 (12), 2:07 | 4 Mar 2023 | Korakuen Hall Tokyo, Japan | Won OPBF bantamweight title |
| 24 | Loss | 16–7–1 | Kai Chiba | TKO | 12 (12), 0:50 | 22 Sep 2022 | Korakuen Hall, Tokyo, Japan | Lost OPBF bantamweight title |
| 23 | Draw | 16–6–1 | Yukinori Oguni | TD | 4 (10), 2:40 | 20 May 2022 | Korakuen Hall, Tokyo, Japan | Fight stopped due to Oguni sustaining a cut from an accidental headbutt |
| 22 | Win | 16–6 | Kazuki Nakajima | TKO | 3 (12), 0:52 | 19 Oct 2021 | Korakuen Hall, Tokyo, Japan | Won OPBF bantamweight title |
| 21 | Loss | 15–6 | Takuma Inoue | TD | 9 (12), 2:25 | 14 Jan 2021 | Korakuen Hall, Tokyo, Japan | Lost OPBF bantamweight title; Unanimous TD: Fight stopped after Kurihara sustained a cut due to accidental clash of heads |
| 20 | Win | 15–5 | Sukkasem Kietyongyuth | TKO | 2 (8), 1:58 | 15 Nov 2019 | Korakuen Hall, Tokyo, Japan | |
| 19 | Win | 14–5 | Warlito Parrenas | KO | 1 (12), 0:35 | 10 May 2019 | Korakuen Hall, Tokyo, Japan | Retained OPBF bantamweight title |
| 18 | Win | 13–5 | Yuki Strong Kobayashi | UD | 12 | 24 Dec 2018 | Sumiyoshi Ward Center, Osaka, Japan | Won vacant OPBF bantamweight title |
| 17 | Win | 12–5 | Kazuki Tanaka | TKO | 3 (8), 2:35 | 1 Aug 2018 | City Sogo Gym, Hirakata, Japan | |
| 16 | Win | 11–5 | Tetsuya Watanabe | TKO | 1 (8), 1:21 | 11 May 2018 | Korakuen Hall, Tokyo, Japan | |
| 15 | Win | 10–5 | Ryan Lumacad | KO | 2 (8), 3:09 | 1 Dec 2017 | Korakuen Hall, Tokyo, Japan | |
| 14 | Loss | 9–5 | Hiroaki Teshigawara | TKO | 5 (8), 2:06 | 19 Jun 2017 | Korakuen Hall, Tokyo, Japan | |
| 13 | Win | 9–4 | Engelbert Moralde | TKO | 1 (8), 2:59 | 10 Mar 2017 | Korakuen Hall, Tokyo, Japan | |
| 12 | Win | 8–4 | Sonin Nihei | TKO | 3 (8), 1:46 | 12 Dec 2016 | Korakuen Hall, Tokyo, Japan | |
| 11 | Win | 7–4 | Jun Koseki | TKO | 5 (8), 1:13 | 13 Sep 2016 | Korakuen Hall, Tokyo, Japan | |
| 10 | Win | 6–4 | Yuito Yamaguchi | TKO | 4 (6), 0:44 | 13 Jun 2016 | Korakuen Hall, Tokyo, Japan | |
| 9 | Win | 5–4 | Hirofumi Tachibana | TKO | 4 (6), 0:38 | 3 Mar 2015 | Korakuen Hall, Tokyo, Japan | |
| 8 | Win | 4–4 | Satoru Morishita | UD | 4 | 17 Nov 2014 | Korakuen Hall, Tokyo, Japan | |
| 7 | Loss | 3–4 | Hiroyasu Shiga | TKO | 1 (4), 0:52 | 7 Jul 2014 | Korakuen Hall, Tokyo, Japan | |
| 6 | Loss | 3–3 | Shoji Ebisawa | UD | 4 | 7 Mar 2014 | Korakuen Hall, Tokyo, Japan | |
| 5 | Win | 3–2 | Takuma Okada | KO | 3 (4), 2:05 | 21 Nov 2012 | Korakuen Hall, Tokyo, Japan | |
| 4 | Loss | 2–2 | Takahiro Fujii | TKO | 4 (4), 2:50 | 13 Jul 2012 | Korakuen Hall, Tokyo, Japan | |
| 3 | Loss | 2–1 | Koya Sato | UD | 4 | 30 Jan 2012 | Korakuen Hall, Tokyo, Japan | |
| 2 | Win | 2–0 | Yohei Suzuki | TKO | 4 (4), 1:36 | 31 Oct 2011 | Korakuen Hall, Tokyo, Japan | |
| 1 | Win | 1–0 | Yoshiyuki Shimizu | TKO | 1 (4), 2:56 | 6 Apr 2011 | Korakuen Hall, Tokyo, Japan | |
