= Hiroaki Teshigawara =

Japanese boxer

Hiroaki Teshigawara 勅使河原弘晶
Personal information
- Nationality: Japanese
- Born: 3 June 1990 (age 36) Sawa District, Gunma, Japan
- Height: 1.70 m (5 ft 7 in)
- Weight: Bantamweight; Super-bantamweight

Boxing career
- Stance: Orthodox

Boxing record
- Total fights: 27
- Wins: 22
- Win by KO: 15
- Losses: 3
- Draws: 2

Hiroaki Teshigawara (勅使河原弘晶, Teshigawara Hiroaki; born 3 June 1990) is a Japanese professional boxer. He has held the WBC-OPBF super-bantamweight title since 2018 and previously the WBO Asia Pacific bantamweight title from 2017 to 2018. As of August 2020, he is ranked as the world's fourth best active super-bantamweight by BoxRec and seventh by The Ring.

== Professional career ==
Teshigawara made his professional debut on 28 July 2011, scoring a third-round technical knockout (TKO) victory over Naoto Tabata at the Korakuen Hall in Tokyo, Japan.

After compiling a record of 14–2–2 (8 KOs) he challenged WBO Asia Pacific bantamweight champion Jetro Pabustan on 12 October 2017 at the Korakuen Hall. Teshigawara scored a knockdown in the ninth round. In the tenth, after Pabustan received a point deduction for excessive holding, the referee called a halt to the contest to save Pabustan from further punishment, awarding Teshigawara his first professional title via tenth-round TKO. At the time of the stoppage Teshigawara was ahead on all three judges' scorecards with 89–81, 88–82, and 87–83.

He began 2018 with two successful defences of his WBO regional title – a unanimous decision (UD) against Jason Canoy in February and a fifth-round knockout (KO) against Teiru Kinoshita in June – before moving up in weight to face Glenn Suminguit for the vacant WBC-OPBF super-bantamweight title on 11 October at the Korakuen Hall. Teshigawara captured his second professional title, defeating Suminguit via fifth-round KO.

He made three successful defences of his WBC regional title in 2019, scoring stoppage wins against Yuki Iriguchi in February; Shohei Omori in August; and Shohei Kawashima in December.

== Professional boxing record ==
27 fights	22 wins	3 losses
By knockout	15	1
By decision	7	2
Draws	2	

No.	Result	Record	Opponent	Type	Round, time	Date	Location	Notes
27	Loss	22–3–2	Marlon Tapales	TKO	2 (12)	Dec 11, 2021	Dignity Health Sports Park, Carson, U.S.	
26	Win	22–2–2	Shingo Kawamura	TKO	12	12 Dec 2019	Korakuen Hall, Tokyo, Japan	Retained WBC-OPBF super-bantamweight title
25	Win	21–2–2	Shohei Kawashima	KO	5 (12), 3:09	12 Dec 2019	Korakuen Hall, Tokyo, Japan	Retained WBC-OPBF super-bantamweight title
24	Win	20–2–2	Shohei Omori	TKO	12 (12), 2:36	8 Aug 2019	Korakuen Hall, Tokyo, Japan	Retained WBC-OPBF super-bantamweight title
23	Win	19–2–2	Yuki Iriguchi	TKO	8 (12), 1:56	14 Feb 2019	Korakuen Hall, Tokyo, Japan	Retained WBC-OPBF super-bantamweight title
22	Win	18–2–2	Glenn Suminguit	KO	5 (12), 1:10	11 Oct 2018	Korakuen Hall, Tokyo, Japan	Won vacant WBC-OPBF super-bantamweight title
21	Win	17–2–2	Teiru Kinoshita	KO	5 (12), 2:41	14 Jun 2018	Korakuen Hall, Tokyo, Japan	Retained WBO Asia Pacific bantamweight title
20	Win	16–2–2	Jason Canoy	UD	12	8 Feb 2018	Korakuen Hall, Tokyo, Japan	Retained WBO Asia Pacific bantamweight title
19	Win	15–2–2	Jetro Pabustan	TKO	10 (12), 2:52	12 Oct 2017	Korakuen Hall, Tokyo, Japan	Won WBO Asia Pacific bantamweight title
18	Win	14–2–2	Keita Kurihara	TKO	5 (8), 2:06	19 Jun 2017	Korakuen Hall, Tokyo, Japan	
17	Win	13–2–2	Junny Salogaol	TKO	2 (8), 0:46	10 Apr 2017	Korakuen Hall, Tokyo, Japan	
16	Loss	12–2–2	Ryo Akaho	SD	10	11 Oct 2016	Korakuen Hall, Tokyo, Japan	
15	Win	12–1–2	Yoshihiro Utsumi	UD	8	28 Jul 2016	Korakuen Hall, Tokyo, Japan	
14	Win	11–1–2	Kenichi Watanabe	TKO	1 (8), 1:22	18 Mar 2016	Korakuen Hall, Tokyo, Japan	
13	Win	10–1–2	Shuji Hamada	TKO	7 (8), 0:17	14 Dec 2015	Korakuen Hall, Tokyo, Japan	
12	Draw	9–1–2	Hideo Sakamoto	MD	8	17 Jul 2015	Korakuen Hall, Tokyo, Japan	
11	Win	9–1–1	Gaku Aikawa	UD	8	8 Dec 2014	Korakuen Hall, Tokyo, Japan	
10	Win	8–1–1	Kota Sato	UD	6	1 Nov 2013	Korakuen Hall, Tokyo, Japan	
9	Win	7–1–1	Kyosuke Sawada	TKO	4 (6), 2:58	12 Aug 2013	Korakuen Hall, Tokyo, Japan	
8	Win	6–1–1	Ryosuke Ono	UD	6	27 Mar 2013	Korakuen Hall, Tokyo, Japan	
7	Loss	5–1–1	Yusuke Tachikawa	UD	5	4 Nov 2012	Korakuen Hall, Tokyo, Japan	
6	Win	5–0–1	Corrales Kawashimo	UD	4	27 Sep 2012	Korakuen Hall, Tokyo, Japan	
5	Win	4–0–1	Ryo Nakamura	TKO	3 (4), 1:31	7 Aug 2012	Korakuen Hall, Tokyo, Japan	
4	Draw	3–0–1	Yoshito Ikari	MD	4	29 Jun 2012	Korakuen Hall, Tokyo, Japan	
3	Win	3–0	Yuto Sasamori	MD	4	17 Apr 2012	Korakuen Hall, Tokyo, Japan	
2	Win	2–0	Shogo Sumitomo	TKO	2 (4), 2:17	25 Nov 2011	Korakuen Hall, Tokyo, Japan	
1	Win	1–0	Naoto Tabata	TKO	3 (4), 2:18	28 Jul 2011	Korakuen Hall, Tokyo, Japan	

Sporting positions
Regional boxing titles
Preceded by Jetro Pabustan	WBO Asia Pacific bantamweight champion 12 October 2017 – September 2018; Vacated	Vacant Title next held by Ben Mananquil
Vacant Title last held by Hidenori Otake	WBC-OPBF super-bantamweight champion 11 October 2018 – present	Incumbent
