= Koki Inoue =

Japanese boxer (born 1992)

Personal information
- Nationality: Japanese
- Born: Hiroki Inoue; 11 May 1992 (age 34) Zama, Kanagawa, Japan
- Height: 5 ft 9 1/2 in (177 cm)
- Weight: Light-welterweight

Boxing career
- Stance: Southpaw

Boxing record
- Total fights: 20
- Wins: 18
- Win by KO: 15
- Losses: 2

Hiroki "Koki" Inoue (井上浩樹, Inoue Hiroki; born 11 May 1992) is a Japanese professional boxer. He is the older cousin of boxers Naoya Inoue and Takuma Inoue.

== Professional career ==
Inoue made his professional debut on 29 December 2015, scoring a first-round knockout (KO) victory over Jackson Koel Lapie at the Ariake Coliseum in Tokyo, Japan.

After compiling a record of 12–0 (10 KOs) he defeated Valentine Hosokawa on 6 April 2019 at the Korakuen Hall, Tokyo, capturing the Japanese light-welterweight title via ten-round unanimous decision (UD), with the scorecards reading 98–92, 98–93 and 97–93.

After retaining his title with a fifth-round technical knockout (TKO) against Ryuji Ikeda in July, Inoue defeated Jheritz Chavez on 2 December 2019 at the Korakuen Hall, capturing the vacant WBO Asia Pacific light-welterweight title via seventh-round KO.

== Professional boxing record ==
20 fights	18 wins	2 losses
By knockout	15	1
By decision	3	1

No.	Result	Record	Opponent	Type	Round, time	Date	Location	Notes
20	Win	18–2	Mikhail Lesnikov	KO	3 (8), 2:04	31 Mar 2025	Korakuen Hall, Tokyo, Japan	
19	Loss	17–2	Daishi Nagata	MD	12	22 Feb 2024	Korakuen Hall, Tokyo, Japan	Lost WBO Asia Pacific light-welterweight title; For OPBF light-welterweight title
18	Win	17–1	Abdurasul Ismoilov	TKO	10 (12), 2:11	30 Aug 2023	Korakuen Hall, Tokyo, Japan	Won vacant WBO Asia Pacific light-welterweight title
17	Win	16–1	Phakorn Aiemyod	TKO	2 (8), 0:38	16 Feb 2023	Korakuen Hall, Tokyo, Japan	
16	Loss	15–1	Daishi Nagata	TKO	7 (10), 2:17	16 Jul 2020	Korakuen Hall, Tokyo, Japan	Lost Japanese light-welterweight title
15	Win	15–0	Jheritz Chavez	KO	7 (12), 2:08	2 Dec 2019	Korakuen Hall, Tokyo, Japan	Won vacant WBO Asia Pacific light-welterweight title
14	Win	14–0	Ryuji Ikeda	TKO	5 (10), 0:34	1 Jul 2019	Korakuen Hall, Tokyo, Japan	Retained Japanese light-welterweight title
13	Win	13–0	Valentine Hosokawa	UD	10	6 Apr 2019	Korakuen Hall, Tokyo, Japan	Won Japanese light-welterweight title
12	Win	12–0	Marcus Smith	UD	8	12 Oct 2018	Korakuen Hall, Tokyo, Japan	
11	Win	11–0	Petkhaikaew P. Petkhaikaew	KO	2 (8), 1:04	26 Mar 2018	Korakuen Hall, Tokyo, Japan	
10	Win	10–0	Dong Hee Kim	TKO	4 (8), 1:25	30 Dec 2017	Bunka Gym, Yokohama, Japan	
9	Win	9–0	Cristiano Aoqui	RTD	2 (8), 0:07	30 Aug 2017	Korakuen Hall, Tokyo, Japan	
8	Win	8–0	Ni Wisoram	KO	1 (10), 1:01	25 Jun 2017	City Sogo Gym, Tokyo, Japan	
7	Win	7–0	Mitsuyoshi Fujita	TKO	5 (8), 2:25	27 Mar 2017	Korakuen Hall, Tokyo, Japan	
6	Win	6–0	Futoshi Usami	TKO	3 (8), 1:03	30 Dec 2016	Ariake Coliseum, Tokyo, Japan	
5	Win	5–0	Heri Andriyanto	TKO	2 (8), 1:20	4 Sep 2016	Sky Arena, Zama, Japan	
4	Win	4–0	Hyun Woo Yuh	UD	6	26 Jun 2016	Fashion Center Event Hall, Seoul, South Korea	
3	Win	3–0	Bima Prakosa	TKO	1 (8), 2:59	8 May 2016	Ariake Coliseum, Tokyo, Japan	
2	Win	2–0	Wuttichok Injun	KO	1 (6), 0:55	28 Mar 2016	Korakuen Hall, Tokyo, Japan	
1	Win	1–0	Jackson Koel Lapie	KO	1 (6), 2:44	29 Dec 2015	Ariake Coliseum, Tokyo, Japan	
