= Shingo Wake =

Japanese boxer

Shingo Wake 和氣 慎吾
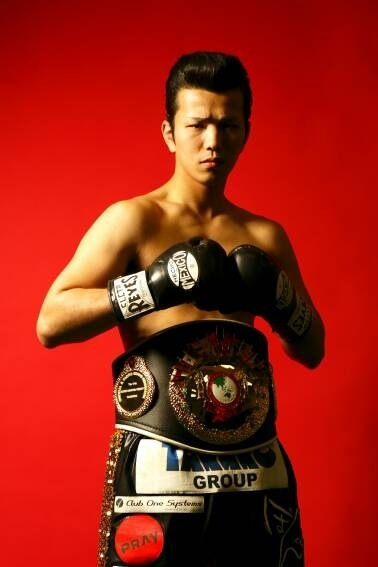
- Wake in 2013

Personal information
- Nickname: Regent boxer
- Nationality: Japanese
- Born: 21 July 1987 (age 38) Okayama, Okayama Prefecture, Japan
- Height: 5 ft 8 in (173 cm)
- Weight: Super bantamweight

Boxing career
- Stance: Southpaw

Boxing record
- Total fights: 40
- Wins: 30
- Win by KO: 21
- Losses: 8
- Draws: 2

Shingo Wake (和氣 慎吾, Wake Shingo; born 21 July 1987) is a Japanese professional boxer and former OPBF super bantamweight champion. He trained under Satoshi Koguchi at Koguchi Boxing Gym in Tokyo. Wake was scouted early by Koguchi, who spotted his talent and persuaded him to move to Tokyo and pursue a boxing career. He has since changed boxing gym and now trains at Flare boxing gym. A southpaw, Wake is dubbed a "sharp shooter" due to his accuracy and speed in the ring.

== Professional career ==
Wake made his professional debut in October 2006, defeating his opponent by KO in the first round. He then continued his way up the professional circuit to eventually land his first title shot, against undefeated champion, Yukinori Oguni, in March 2013. Wake was considered a big underdog for the fight, traveling to Kobe to face the champion. Wake put on a clinic in front of a stunned audience, even knocking Oguni down in the 2nd. He then proceeded to take his opponent apart with precision jabs and his signature straight left.

Oguni's corner threw in the towel in the 10th, having seen their fighter take enough punishment. Wake made his first title defense against Eita Kikuchi in June 2013. He knocked down Kikuchi in the 2nd round and eventually won by TKO in the 9th.

In the third defence of his OPBF title Wake defeated Filipino fighter Jovy Katsumata by TKO before following that up by beating Korean fighter Jaesung Lee in the 4th defence of his title. The contest with Lee was made noteworthy by the fact Wake sent the Korean fighter out of the ring before stopping him in the following round, the 10th.

Wake challenged Jonathan Guzman for the IBF super bantam weight title in July 2016 but lost by TKO in the 9th round. He was dropped several times throughout the fight.

After the defeat, he changed trainers and gym. He won his next fight by TKO in Tokyo.

== Professional boxing record ==
42 fights	31 wins	9 losses
By knockout	22	4
By decision	9	5
Draws	2	

No.	Result	Record	Opponent	Type	Round, time	Date	Location	Notes
42	Loss	31–9–2	Kazuki Nakajima	KO	2 (12), 2:11	27 Aug 2024	Korakuen Hall, Tokyo, Japan	For OPBF super bantamweight title
41	Win	31–8–2	Prathip Chinram	TKO	2 (8), 0:53	14 May 2024	Korakuen Hall, Tokyo, Japan	
40	Win	30–8–2	José Velásquez	UD	8	3 Sep 2023	Convex Okayama, Okayama, Japan	
39	Win	29–8–2	Kiattisak Thawisap	KO	2 (8), 2:16	20 Jul 2023	Korakuen Hall, Tokyo, Japan	
38	Loss	28–8–2	Mugicha Nakagawa	TKO	4 (8), 0:29	22 Oct 2022	Korakuen Hall, Tokyo, Japan	
37	Win	28–7–2	Naoto Mizutani	TKO	7 (8), 2:56	23 Jun 2022	Korakuen Hall, Tokyo, Japan	
36	Loss	27–7–2	Takuma Inoue	UD	12	11 Nov 2021	Korakuen Hall, Tokyo, Japan	For vacant WBO Asia Pacific super bantamweight title
35	Win	27–6–2	Shohei Kawashima	KO	6 (8), 2:48	22 Aug 2020	Korakuen Hall, Tokyo, Japan	
34	Loss	26–6–2	Jhunriel Ramonal	TKO	3 (8), 2:59	11 Oct 2019	Korakuen Hall, Tokyo, Japan	
33	Win	26–5–2	Takafumi Nakajima	TKO	6 (10), 2:20	29 Jan 2019	Korakuen Hall, Tokyo, Japan	
32	Win	25–5–2	Yusaku Kuga	TKO	10 (10), 0:36	27 Jul 2018	Korakuen Hall, Tokyo, Japan	Won Japanese super bantamweight title
31	Win	24–5–2	Roman Canto	TKO	4 (8), 2:50	17 Apr 2018	Korakuen Hall, Tokyo, Japan	
30	Win	23–5–2	Adundet Saithonggym	TKO	3 (8), 1:40	31 Dec 2017	Ota City General Gymnasium, Tokyo, Japan	
29	Win	22–5–2	Panomroonglek Kratingdaenggym	KO	8 (8), 2:45	13 Sep 2017	EDION Arena Osaka, Osaka, Japan	
28	Win	21–5–2	Mikihiko Seto	TKO	5 (8), 2:31	19 Jul 2017	Korakuen Hall, Tokyo, Japan	
27	Loss	20–5–2	Jonathan Guzmán	TKO	11 (12), 2:16	20 Jul 2016	EDION Arena Osaka, Osaka, Japan	For vacant IBF super bantamweight title
26	Win	20–4–2	Waldo Sabu	KO	5 (10), 1:25	17 Feb 2016	Korakuen Hall, Tokyo, Japan	
25	Win	19–4–2	Pipat Chaiporn	UD	12	10 Jun 2015	Korakuen Hall, Tokyo, Japan	
24	Win	18–4–2	Jimmy Paypa	KO	1 (12), 2:59	27 Feb 2015	Korakuen Hall, Tokyo, Japan	Retained OPBF super bantamweight tirle
23	Win	17–4–2	Lee Jae-sung	TKO	10 (12), 0:27	21 Jul 2014	Budokan, Okayama, Japan	Retained OPBF super bantamweight tirle
22	Win	16–4–2	Jovylito Aligarbes	KO	2 (12), 2:14	10 Feb 2014	Korakuen Hall, Tokyo, Japan	Retained OPBF super bantamweight title
21	Win	15–4–2	Jhunriel Ramonal	TKO	3 (12), 2:12	14 Oct 2013	Korakuen Hall, Tokyo, Japan	Retained OPBF super bantamweight title
20	Win	14–4–2	Euta Kikuchi	TKO	9 (12), 2:24	10 Jun 2013	Korakuen Hall, Tokyo, Japan	Retained OPBF super bantamweight title
19	Win	13–4–2	Yukinori Oguni	RTD	10 (12), 3:00	10 Mar 2013	Sambo Hall, Kobe, Japan	Won OPBF super bantamweight title
18	Win	12–4–2	Takuya Yamaguchi	UD	8	3 Nov 2012	Korakuen Hall, Tokyo, Japan	
17	Win	11–4–2	Jonathan Baat	UD	8	11 Jul 2012	Korakuen Hall, Tokyo, Japan	
16	Loss	10–4–2	Takafumi Nakajima	UD	8	11 May 2012	Korakuen Hall, Tokyo, Japan	
15	Draw	10–3–2	Coach Hiroto	SD	8	1 Oct 2011	Korakuen Hall, Tokyo, Japan	
14	Win	10–3–1	Yuki Kishi	TKO	8 (8), 0:57	7 Apr 2011	Korakuen Hall, Tokyo, Japan	
13	Win	9–3–1	Ryoji Okahata	TKO	6 (8), 2:01	15 Nov 2010	Korakuen Hall, Tokyo, Japan	
12	Win	8–3–1	Yuji Takahashi	UD	6	26 Jul 2010	Korakuen Hall, Tokyo, Japan	
11	Win	7–3–1	Masahiro Ishida	UD	6	15 Feb 2010	Korakuen Hall, Tokyo, Japan	
10	Loss	6–3–1	Yasutaka Ishimoto	UD	8	7 Nov 2009	Korakuen Hall, Tokyo, Japan	
9	Win	6–2–1	Yuji Ota	TKO	3 (5), 1:45	31 Jul 2009	Korakuen Hall, Tokyo, Japan	
8	Win	5–2–1	Hiroaki Abe	UD	6	24 Mar 2009	Korakuen Hall, Tokyo, Japan	
7	Win	4–2–1	Hideto Oishi	UD	4	9 Oct 2008	Korakuen Hall, Tokyo, Japan	
6	Loss	3–2–1	Shoken Horahira	UD	4	16 May 2008	Korakuen Hall, Tokyo, Japan	
5	Draw	3–1–1	Ken Jiro	MD	4	24 Dec 2007	Shinjuku FACE, Tokyo, Japan	
4	Loss	3–1	Yuki Kubo	MD	4	6 Aug 2007	Korakuen Hall, Tokyo, Japan	
3	Win	3–0	Kenta Kozeki	UD	4	29 May 2007	Korakuen Hall, Tokyo, Japan	
2	Win	2–0	Masatsugu Iida	KO	2 (4), 1:14	18 Apr 2007	Korakuen Hall, Tokyo, Japan	
1	Win	1–0	Shinnosuke Sato	KO	1 (4), 0:24	31 Oct 2006	Korakuen Hall, Tokyo, Japan	

== Personal life ==
Wake enjoys eating yakiniku and driving in his free time. He keeps a personal blog of his life at http://ameblo.jp/cool0224/.
