= Froilan Saludar =

Filipino boxer

Personal information
- Nickname: The Sniper
- Nationality: Filipino
- Born: Froilan Miranda Saludar; April 17, 1989 (age 37) Polomolok, South Cotabato, Philippines
- Height: 1.68 m (5 ft 6 in)
- Weight: Flyweight Super Flyweight Bantamweight Super Bantamweight

Boxing career
- Reach: 170.18 cm (67 in)
- Stance: Orthodox

Boxing record
- Total fights: 47
- Wins: 37
- Win by KO: 26
- Losses: 10
- Draws: 1

Froilan Miranda Saludar (born April 17, 1989, in Palomok, Cotabato del Sur, Philippines) is a Filipino boxer.

== Professional career ==
WBO Asia Pacific Youth flyweight championship

After 8 wins and 1 draw, Saludar was faced against Remuel Obidos for the vacant WBO Asia Pacific youth flyweight title against Fellow Filipino boxer, Remuel Obidos, Saludar finished Obidos in the very 1st round of their match, earning him the WBO Asia Pacific Youth flyweight title.

WBO Youth flyweight championship

After a successful defence of his WBO Asia Pacific youth flyweight title, Saludar was then booked against Liempetch Sor Veerapol for the WBO Youth flyweight title, like the match against Obidos, Saludar's foe was finished in the vet first round, making Saludar the new WBO Youth flyweight champion.

WBO Asia Pacific flyweight championship

On August 6, 2011, Saludar and Gabriel Pumar was both booked to face each other for the WBO Asia Pacific flyweight title, the fight lasted until the 10th round whereas he knocked downed Pumar in the late goings of the 10th round, Pumar was later stopped.

Saludar vs. Arroyo

Saludar made his first appearance outside of the Philippines in Puerto Rico where he faced the Hard-hitting Puerto Rican boxer, McWilliams Arroyo, Saludar's undefeated record was tainted as Arroyo stopped him in the 2nd Round of their match.

WBO Inter-continental flyweight championship

Suffering from a loss against Arroyo, Saludar still gets to win 2 more times before getting challenged against Ellias Nggenggo for the WBO Inter-continental flyweight title in Haikou, China, in the 5th round of their bout, Saludar knocks Nggenggo down, Nggenggo was unable to get back on his feet, leading to Saludar's victory and Saludar earning the WBO Inter-continental flyweight belt.

Saludar vs. Inoue

One fight after Saludar won the WBO Asia Pacific flyweight title, Saludar was challenged against, Naoya Inoue's brother, Takuma Inoue in Sky Arena, Zama, Japan, during the fight, Saludar gets to knock Inoue once in the first round, Saludar was later more unfortunate as Inoue gets his revenge and knocks Saludar down in the 8th and 9th round, Inoue seemed to be getting better and better every round after the first, due to the comeback, Inoue won via Unanimous decision.

WBO flyweight championship

Saludar was finally given a chance to fight for a world championship against a Japanese, Sho Kimura in Qingdao, China, Unfortunately for Saludar, he was unsuccessful as he gets downed in the 5th round and knocked out in the 6th round.

WBO Asia Pacific super flyweight championship

Moving back down to Super Flyweight, Saludar was booked to face against undefeated boxer, Tsubasa Murachi for the WBO Asia Pacific super flyweight title, Saludar was successful as he defeats Murachi via 8th-round TKO, making this Murachi's first ever loss.

WBO Oriental super flyweight championship

After losing the WBO Asia Pacific title, Saludar later fights fellow Filipino boxer, Reymark Taday, where Saludar won the match, granting him a match against Andrew Moloney for the WBO Oriental Super flyweight title, through best efforts, Saludar failed to earn the victory as he loses via lop-sided decision with the scores of 99-91 two times and 98–92.

Saludar vs. Nery

After Winning his first match in super bantamweight, Saludar was to face Luis Nery, Saludar being a very heavy underdog, still takes the challenge and fought Nery on July 8, 2023, at Mexico. Unfortunately for Saludar, he didn't have the right condition for an opponent like Nery and he lost in the 2nd round of their match.

OPBF bantamweight championship

Saludar moved down back to Bantamweight and faced OPBF champion, Keita Kurihara for the very own title that Kurihara holds, the match was set in Japan and Saludar was initially declared the underdog, on the match, Saludar knocked Kurihara down twice in the first round before forcing the referee to halt the contest on the first minute mark of their match, surprising the crowd in Ariake Arena as the bet was Kurihara.

Not long after however, Saludar was scheduled to defend his OPBF belt whilst the vacant IBF Pan Pacific belt was also put at stake on a rematch against Keita Kurihara on one of the first cards of Philippine boxing during the Year of the Wood Dragon, specifically on January 26, 2024, being the co-main event of the Kumbati 16 card taking place at the Nustar Resort and Casino, Philippines. Saludar failed to defend his OPBP belt, losing to Kurihara via 8th-round knockout.

== Professional boxing record ==
48 fights	37 wins	10 losses
By knockout	26	7
By decision	11	3
Draws	1	

No.	Result	Record	Opponent	Type	Round, Time	Date	Location	Notes
48	Loss	37–10–1	Yuta Sakai	TKO	7 (8), 0:47	10 Jun 2026	Korakuen Hall, Tokyo, Japan	
47	Loss	37–9–1	Charlton Malajika	TKO	4 (8)	4 Oct 2025	Emperors Palace, Kempton Park, South Africa	
46	Win	37–8–1	Jeny Boy Boca	KO	4 (6), 1:34	11 Jul 2025	Sunken Arena Covered Grounds, Malungon, Philippines	
45	Win	36–8–1	Williams Flores	UD	10	15 Nov 2024	Agenda Arena, Dubai, United Arab Emirates	Won vacant WBA Inter-Continental bantamweight title
44	Win	35–8–1	Reymark Taday	KO	2 (6), 0:20	30 Aug 2024	Polomolok Gym, Polomolok, Philippines	
43	Loss	34–8–1	Keita Kurihara	KO	8 (12), 1:13	26 Jan 2024	Nustar Resort and Casino, Cebu City, Philippines	Lost OPBF bantamweight title; For vacant IBF Pan Pacific and IBF Asia bantamweight titles
42	Win	34–7–1	Keita Kurihara	TKO	1 (12) 1:00	12 Oct 2023	Ariake Arena, Tokyo, Japan	Won OPBF bantamweight title
41	Loss	33–7–1	Luis Nery	TKO	2 (12) 0:41	8 Jul 2023	Centro de Espectáculos del Recinto Ferial, Metepec, Mexico	
40	Win	33–6–1	Crison Omayao	TKO	1 (6) 1:27	29 Oct 2022	Lagao Gym, General Santos, Philippines	
39	Loss	32–6–1	Daigo Higa	SD	8	13 Jul 2022	Ota-City General Gymnasium, Tokyo, Japan	
38	Loss	32–5–1	Andrew Moloney	UD	10	21 Dec 2021	The Star Event Centre, Sydney, Australia	For vacant WBO Oriental super flyweight title
37	Win	32–4–1	Reymark Taday	UD	8	17 Mar 2021	General Santos, Cotabato del Sur, Philippines	
36	Loss	31–4–1	Ryoji Fukunaga	TKO	7 (12) 1:40	14 Feb 2020	Korakuen Hall, Tokyo, Japan	Lost WBO Asia Pacific super flyweight title
35	Win	31–3–1	Tsubasa Murachi	TKO	8 (12) 0:54	21 Sep 2019	Korakuen Hall, Tokyo, Japan	Won vacant WBO Asia Pacific super flyweight title
34	Win	30–3–1	Jonathan Francisco	TKO	2 (8) 2:59	10 Feb 2019	Roseller Lim, Zamboanga Sibugay, Philippines	
33	Win	29–3–1	Donny Mabao	TKO	8 (8) 1:56	1 Dec 2018	Central Market Gym, Iligan, Philippines	
32	Loss	28–3–1	Sho Kimura	KO	6 (12) 0:54	27 Jul 2018	Qingdao Guosen Gymnasium, Qingdao, China	For WBO flyweight title
31	Win	28–2–1	Jonathan Francisco	TKO	5 (10) 1:29	3 Apr 2018	Manolo Fortich Municipal Gymnasium, Manolo Fortich, Philippines	
30	Win	27–2–1	Rogen Flores	TKO	1 (10) 1:45	23 Dec 2017	Enan Chiong Activity Center, Naga, Philippines	
29	Win	26–2–1	John Rey Lauza	KO	4 (10) 2:12	30 Aug 2017	Barangay Bulua Covered Court, Cagayan de Oro, Philippines	
28	Win	25–2–1	Salatiel Amit	TKO	9 (10) 1:28	10 Jun 2017	Mandaue City Sports and Cultural Complex, Mandaue, Philippines	
27	Win	24–2–1	Roque Lauro	TKO	1 (10) 2:25	1 Mar 2017	Barangay Bulua Covered Court, Cagayan de Oro, Philippines	
26	Loss	23–2–1	Takuma Inoue	UD	10	4 Sep 2016	Sky Arena, Zama, Japan	
25	Win	23–1–1	Michael Escobia	TD	6 (10) 2:35	9 Sep 2015	Polomolok Gym, Polomolok, Philippines	Escobia suffered a severe punch as a result of a punch thus the fight was stopped
24	Win	22–1–1	Ellias Nggenggo	TKO	5 (12)	25 Apr 2015	Haikou, China	Won vacant WBO Inter-Continental flyweight title
23	Win	21–1–1	Michael Escobia	UD	10	14 Feb 2015	Barangay Bulua Covered Court, Cagayan de Oro, Philippines	
22	Win	20–1–1	Juan Purisima	TKO	2 (10) 1:02	4 Oct 2014	Macasandig Covered Court, Cagayan de Oro, Philippines	
21	Loss	19–1–1	McWilliams Arroyo	TKO	2 (12) 2:25	19 Jun 2014	Coliseo Rubén Rodríguez, Bayamón, Puerto Rico	
20	Win	19–0–1	Rogen Flores	RTD	2 (10)	12 Apr 2014	Macasandig Gym, Cagayan de Oro, Philippines	
19	Win	18–0–1	Eaktwan BTU Ruaviking	UD	10	26 Oct 2013	Makati Coliseum, Makati, Philippines	
18	Win	17–0–1	Julius Alcos	UD	10	7 Sep 2013	Poblacion Balamban Sports Complex, Balamban, Philippines	
17	Win	16–0–1	José Alfredo Tirado	UD	12	21 Sep 2021	Cuneta Astrodome, Pasay, Philippines	
16	Win	15–0–1	Alejandro Morales	UD	10	17 Mar 2012	Hoops Dome, Lapu-Lapu City, Philippines	Retained WBO Asia Pacific and WBO Youth flyweight titles
15	Win	14–0–1	Nelson Llanos	KO	1 (10) 2:57	23 Dec 2011	Imus Plaza Covered Court, Imus, Philippines	
14	Win	13–0–1	Gabriel Pumar	TKO	10 (12) 2:54	6 Aug 2011	Island Cove Hotel and Leisure Park, Kawit, Philippines	Won vacant WBO Asia Pacific flyweight title
13	Win	12–0–1	Jack Amisa	TKO	1 (10) 1:46	28 May 2011	Imus Plaza Covered Court, Imus, Philippines	
12	Win	11–0–1	Liempetch Sor Veerapol	TKO	1 (12) 1:24	19 Feb 2011	Imus Plaza Covered Court, Imus, Philippines	Won vacant WBO Youth flyweight title
11	Win	10–0–1	Jecker Buhawe	KO	2 (10) 2:59	22 Dec 2010	Imus Sports Gymnasium, Imus, Philippines	Retained WBO Asia Pacific Youth flyweight title
10	Win	9–0–1	Remuel Obidos	KO	1 (10) 2:26	20 Nov 2010	Imus Plaza Covered Court, Imus, Philippines	Won vacant WBO Asia Pacific Youth flyweight title
9	Win	8–0–1	Michael Romulo	TKO	3 (8) 1:57	26 Sep 2010	Arayata Sports Complex, Tanza, Philippines	
8	Win	7–0–1	Salvador Layson	KO	4 (6) 2:12	7 Aug 2010	Arayata Sports Complex, Tanza, Philippines	
7	Draw	6–0–1	Brian Diano	TD	1 (6), 2:49	26 Jun 2010	Bagumbayan Sports Complex, Taguig, Philippines	Fight stopped due to a cut on Diano's eyelid caused by an accidental headbutt
6	Win	6–0	Ryan Illustrisimo	UD	6	15 May 2010	Wilfredo Cabalse Sports Complex, Cebu City, Philippines	
5	Win	5–0	Ryan Rey Ponteras	UD	4	14 Feb 2010	M'lang Municipal Plaza, M'lang, Philippines	
4	Win	4–0	Elbert Guardario	UD	4	31 Oct 2009	Polomolok Gym, Polomolok, Philippines	
3	Win	3–0	Jhon Gemino	KO	1 (4) 1:36	9 Oct 2009	Dipolog, Zamboanga del Norte, Philippines	
2	Win	2–0	Ramie Gaabon	RTD	1 (4)	3 Sep 2009	Polomolok Gym, Polomolok, Philippines	
1	Win	1–0	Roland Gamolo	TKO	3 (4) 2:03	27 Jul 2009	Polanco, Zamboanga del Norte, Philippines	

== Personal life ==
Saludar has two brothers consisting of Vic Saludar who was the former WBO light-flyweight champion and also former WBA (Regular) light-flyweight champion and the other one being Rey Saludar who is a gold medalist in the Asian games.
