= Yukinori Oguni =

Japanese boxer

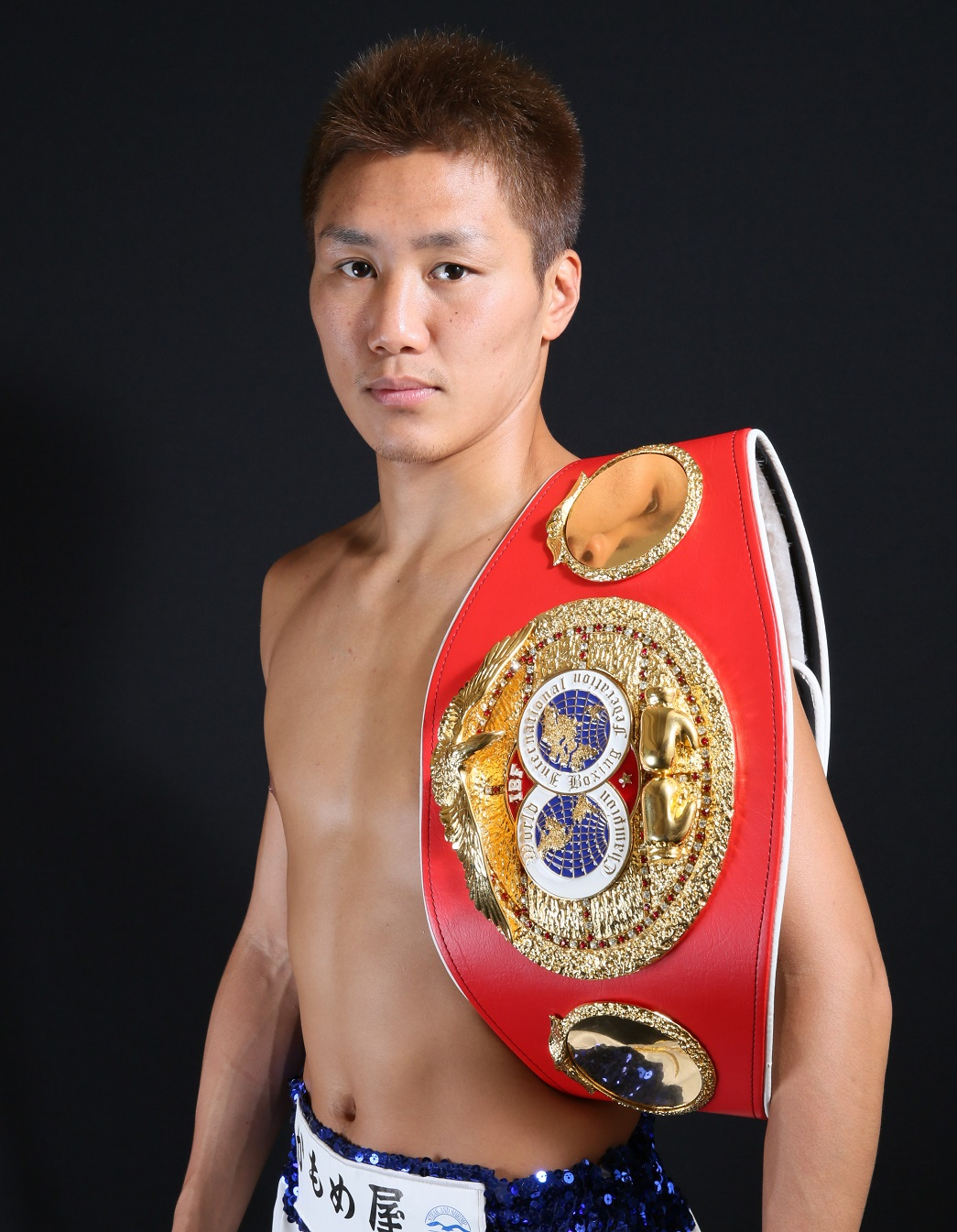

Personal information
- Nickname: Meteor of Ako
- Nationality: Japanese
- Born: 小國以載; May 19, 1988 (age 38) Akō, Hyōgo, Japan
- Height: 5 ft 7 1/2 in (171 cm)
- Weight: Super bantamweight

Boxing career
- Reach: 69 1/2 in (177 cm)
- Stance: Orthodox

Boxing record
- Total fights: 32
- Wins: 24
- Win by KO: 9
- Losses: 5
- Draws: 3

Yukinori Oguni (小國 以載, Oguni Yukinori; born May 19, 1988) is a Japanese professional boxer from Akō, Hyōgo. He previously held IBF super bantamweight world title.

== Professional boxing career ==
Oguni made his pro debut on November 8, 2009, winning his first ten fights before losing to his countryman Shingo Wake in 2013 for the OPBF super bantamweight title.

=== Oguni vs. Guzmán ===
On his first title bout Oguni was a considerable underdog heading into the bout against Dominican's world champion Jonathan Guzmán, yet Oguni's rode an adrenaline rush all the way to the final round, forcing Guzman to overcome an opening round knockdown and a mid-round cut to prevail by identical scores of 115-112. Oguni pulled off a stunning upset outpointing Jonathan Guzman to win the IBF Super bantamweight title on December 31, 2016 in Kyoto, Japan.

=== Oguni vs. Casimero ===
Oguni will be making his comeback by taking on Filipino's three division world champion John Riel Casimero on October 12, 2023, at the Ariake Arena in Tokyo, Japan. The bout ended with a controversial technical draw because of an accidental headbutt.

== Professional boxing record ==
32 fights	24 wins	5 losses
By knockout	9	5
By decision	15	0
Draws	3	

No.	Result	Record	Opponent	Type	Round, time	Date	Location	Notes
32	Loss	24–5–3	Alex Santisima Jr.	TKO	8 (10), 1:08	16 Aug 2026	Korakuen Hall, Tokyo, Japan	
31	Win	24–4–3	Marlon Tapales	UD	10	3 Apr 2026	Korakuen Hall, Tokyo, Japan	
30	Win	23–4–3	Chainoi Worawut	UD	8	1 Oct 2025	Korakuen Hall, Tokyo, Japan	
29	Loss	22–4–3	Subaru Murata	TKO	6 (12), 1:42	20 May 2025	Korakuen Hall, Tokyo, Japan	For WBO Asia Pacific super bantamweight title
28	Win	22–3–3	Jon Jon Estrada	TKO	1 (8)	10 Apr 2025	Elorde Sports Complex, Parañaque, Philippines	
27	Loss	21–3–3	Filipus Nghitumbwa	TKO	1 (8), 2:23	13 Oct 2024	Yokohama Budokan, Yokohama, Japan	
26	Draw	21–2–3	John Riel Casimero	TD	4 (10), 0:27	12 Oct 2023	Ariake Arena, Tokyo, Japan	TD: Oguni cut from an accidental head clash
25	Draw	21–2–2	Keita Kurihara	TD	4 (10), 2:40	20 May 2022	Korakuen Hall, Tokyo, Japan	
24	Win	21–2–1	Sukpraserd Ponpitak	UD	10	8 May 2019	Korakuen Hall, Tokyo, Japan	
23	Win	20–2–1	Arega Yunian	KO	4 (8), 2:25	1 Dec 2018	Korakuen Hall, Tokyo, Japan	
22	Loss	19–2–1	Ryosuke Iwasa	TKO	6 (12), 2:16	13 Sep 2017	EDION Arena Osaka, Osaka, Japan	Lost IBF super bantamweight title
21	Win	19–1–1	Jonathan Guzmán	UD	12	31 Dec 2016	Shimazu Arena, Kyoto, Japan	Won IBF super bantamweight title
20	Win	18–1–1	JP Macadumpis	KO	1 (8)	2 Sep 2016	Shinjuku FACE, Tokyo, Japan	
19	Win	17–1–1	Pipat Chaiporn	TKO	5 (10)	19 Apr 2016	Korakuen Hall, Tokyo, Japan	
18	Win	16–1–1	Atikun Salaoklang	KO	2 (8)	17 Dec 2015	Korakuen Hall, Tokyo, Japan	
17	Win	15–1–1	Taiki Minamoto	UD	10	6 Dec 2014	Korakuen Hall, Tokyo, Japan	Retained Japanese super bantamweight title
16	Draw	14–1–1	Gakuya Furuhashi	MD	10	16 Apr 2015	Korakuen Hall, Tokyo, Japan	Retained Japanese super bantamweight title
15	Win	14–1	Yasutaka Ishimoto	UD	(10)	6 Dec 2014	Korakuen Hall, Tokyo, Japan	Won vacant Japanese super bantamweight title
14	Win	13–1	Nunchanuthorn Kasemthanaboon	TKO	4 (10)	28 Jul 2014	Korakuen Hall, Tokyo, Japan	
13	Win	12–1	Yuki Fujimoto	TKO	8 (10)	11 Jan 2014	Korakuen Hall, Tokyo, Japan	
12	Win	11–1	Yuki Iwasaki	UD	8	5 Oct 2013	Korakuen Hall, Tokyo, Japan	
11	Loss	10–1	Shingo Wake	RTD	10 (12), 3:00	10 Mar 2013	Sambo Hall, Kobe, Japan	Lost OPBF super bantamweight title
10	Win	10–0	Roli Gasca	SD	12	18 Nov 2012	Sambo Hall, Kobe, Japan	Retained OPBF super bantamweight title
9	Win	9–0	Masaaki Serie	UD	12	14 Jul 2012	Harmony Hall, Ako, Japan	Retained OPBF super bantamweight title
8	Win	8–0	Hiromasa Ohashi	TD	9 (12), 0:21	18 Mar 2012	Aioi Hall, Ako, Japan	Retained OPBF super bantamweight title
7	Win	7–0	Roli Gasca	UD	12	3 Nov 2011	Sambo Hall, Ako, Japan	Won OPBF super bantamweight title
6	Win	6–0	Yudai Matsumoto	UD	8	21 May 2011	Central Gym, Kobe, Japan	
5	Win	5–0	Thaweechok Soseetha	UD	8	16 Jan 2011	Sambo Hall, Ako, Japan	
4	Win	4–0	Eric Rapada	UD	10	10 Oct 2010	Kobe Fashion Mart, Kobe, Japan	
3	Win	3–0	Gedeon Amba	UD	8	2 May 2010	Sangyo Hall, Akashi, Japan	
2	Win	2–0	Koki Saka	RTD	2 (4), 3:00	21 Feb 2010	IMP Hall, Osaka, Japan	
1	Win	1–0	Thanachot Panyarsung	KO	3 (6)	8 Nov 2009	City Sogo Gym, Takasago, Japan	

== See also ==
- List of super-bantamweight boxing champions
- List of Japanese boxing world champions

Achievements
Preceded by Jonathan Guzmán	IBF super bantamweight champion December 31, 2016 - September 13, 2017	Succeeded by Ryosuke Iwasa
