= Kenneth Llover =

Filipino boxer (born 2003)

- Llover in 2025

Personal information
- Nickname: The Lover Boy
- Nationality: Filipino
- Born: 15 January 2003 (age 23) General Trias, Cavite, Philippines
- Height: 1.68 m (5 ft 6 in)
- Weight: Super flyweight; Bantamweight; Super bantamweight

Boxing career
- Reach: 166 cm (65 in)
- Stance: Southpaw

Boxing record
- Total fights: 19
- Wins: 18
- Win by KO: 13
- Losses: 1

Kenneth Llover (born 15 January 2003) is a Filipino professional boxer. He is currently the Oriental and Pacific Boxing Federation (OPBF) Bantamweight champion since March 2025.

== Professional career ==
=== Early career ===
After composing a record of 5–0 with four wins ending via knockout, Llover fought fellow undefeated prospect Ridick Tablanza for the vacant Luzon Professional Boxing Association (LuzProBA) bantamweight title where Llover prevailed via unanimous decision with the scores of 79–73 and 78–74. After a dominating victory from Llover, he fought for the vacant Philippine Boxing Federation (PBF) bantamweight strap on 9 October 2022 against 10–17–1 Jerry Francisco in Parañaque, Llover prevailed via second-round TKO.

==== Llover vs. Cañete ====
On 21 January 2023, Llover defended his PBF bantamweight belt against fellow prospect knockout-artist Benny Cañete in Mandaluyong to headline a Blow by Blow event, Llover stopped Cañete's unbeaten streak with a unanimous decision statement.

==== Llover vs. Pagaling ====
On 29 July 2023 at a Manny Pacquiao Presents: Blow By Blow event, Llover battled against compatriot prospect James Pagaling for the Games and Amusements Board (GAB) "Youth" bantamweight title in the public San Juan Gym, Llover scored a memorable sensational left hand to the jaw in the fourth round that immediately knocked Pagaling out.

=== Rise up the ranks ===
==== Llover vs. Heno ====
On 5 November 2023, back in Llover's hometown of General Trias, Cavite in a twelve-rounder World Boxing Council-affiliated Asian Boxing Council (ABCO) Continental bantamweight championship against former veteran world-title challenger Edward "El Heneral" Heno, Llover prevailed via unanimous decision.

==== Llover vs. Dekanarudo ====
On 15 December 2024 in Osaka, Japan, Llover's debut outside of the Philippines, he was set to face against Japanese regional contender Tulio Dekanarudo for the vacant "Interim" Oriental and Pacific Boxing Federation (OPBF) bantamweight strap, Llover scored a sensational victory as he stopped the latter in 58 seconds.

==== Llover vs. Kurihara ====
Due to being the mandatory challenger for the OPBF bantamweight title, Llover was set to face the absolute OPBF champion veteran Keita Kurihara for the OPBF championship in the famed Korakuen Hall, Tokyo, Llover scored a stunning first-round stoppage victory after the referee prompted the bout to halt due to a barrage of punches that hit the already-stunned Kurihara.

==== Llover vs. Concepción ====
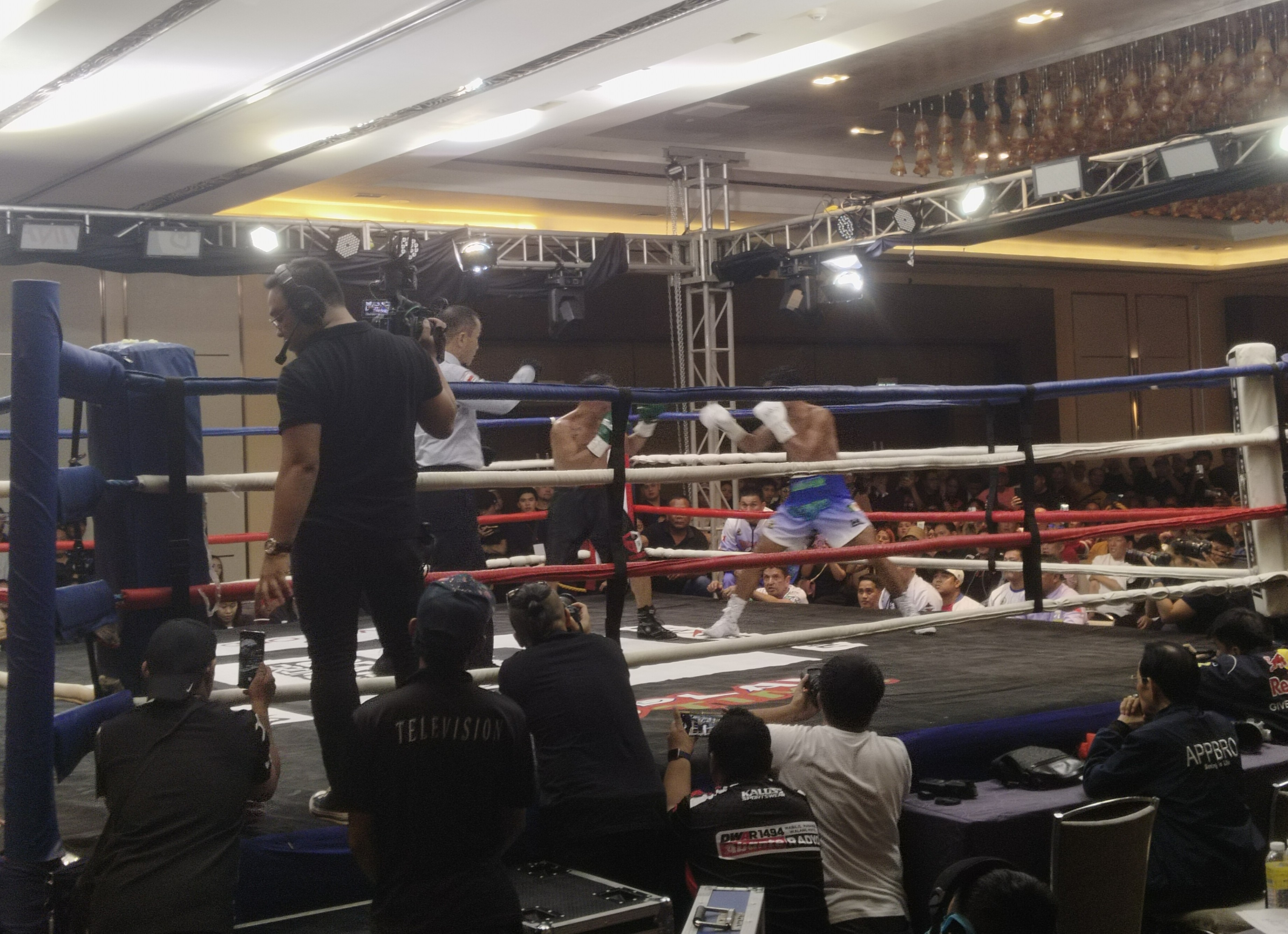
Concepcion vs. Llover, 2025

On 30 April 2025, Llover signed with Kōki Kameda's Kameda Promotions through Gerrypens Promotion (Gerry Peñalosa) for three fights. Thereafter, in July 2025, Llover was scheduled to a 10 rounds bout against former two-division world champion Luis Concepción on 17 August 2025 in Santa Cruz, Manila, Philippines. During the bout Llover scored a TKO victory against Concepción to remain undefeated, the referee halted the bout with 30 seconds left in the eighth-round. Llover improved his record to 15 wins with 10 knockouts.

==== Llover vs. Baldor ====
Llover fought Argentine Luciano Francisco Baldor on a 10-round match at Bishkek Arena in Kyrgyzstan on October 26, 2025, under the SaikouXLush Boxing Promotion. Originally, Team Llover had been in talks for a title eliminator bout against Landile Ngxeke, but the negotiations fell through as Ngxeke reportedly wanted to pursue a direct world title shot instead against. Llover's Promoter Gerry Penalosa stated "We wanted a title eliminator this October. We did all we could to make it happen, but negotiations did not go the way we hoped for,” He defeated Baldor by knockout in the fourth round.

==== Llover vs. Sailike ====
Llover knocked out Ayati Sailike in the second round at Aichi Sky Expo in Tokoname, Japan, on 27 December 2025.

==== Llover vs. Angeletti ====
On 6 June 2026, Llover lost to Michael Angeletti by split decision at Aichi Sky Expo in Tokoname, Japan, in an eliminator for a shot at the IBF bantamweight title. The judges' scorecards read 115–112, 111–116 and 112–115.

== Professional boxing record ==
19 fights	18 wins	1 loss
By knockout	13	0
By decision	5	1

No.	Result	Record	Opponent	Type	Round, time	Date	Location	Notes
19	Win	18–1	Mark Anthony Geraldo	KO	2 (10), 2:17	15 Nov 2026	Dasmarinas Arena, Dasmarinas City, Cavite, Philippines	
18	Loss	17–1	Michael Angeletti	SD	12	6 Jun 2026	Aichi Sky Expo, Tokoname, Japan	
17	Win	17–0	Ayati Sailike	KO	2 (10), 2:07	27 Dec 2025	Aichi Sky Expo, Tokoname, Japan	Retained OPBF bantamweight title
16	Win	16–0	Luciano Baldor	KO	4 (10), 1:42	26 Oct 2025	Bishkek Arena, Bishkek, Kyrgyzstan	
15	Win	15–0	Luis Concepción	TKO	8 (10), 2:27	17 Aug 2025	Winford Resort and Casino, Manila, Philippines	
14	Win	14–0	Keita Kurihara	TKO	1 (12), 2:33	24 Mar 2025	Korakuen Hall, Tokyo, Japan	Won OPBF bantamweight title
13	Win	13–0	Tulio Dekanarudo	TKO	1 (12), 0:58	15 Dec 2024	Sumiyoshi Sports Center, Osaka, Japan	Won vacant OPBF interim bantamweight title
12	Win	12–0	Chencheng Yang	UD	10	24 Aug 2024	BF Homes Gym, Parañaque, Philippines	Won vacant WBO Asia Pacific Youth bantamweight title
11	Win	11–0	Edward Heno	UD	12	5 Nov 2023	General Trias Convention and Cultural Center, General Trias, Philippines	Won vacant WBC-ABCO Continental bantamweight title
10	Win	10–0	James Pagaling	KO	4 (10), 2:57	29 Jul 2023	Filoil EcoOil Centre, San Juan, Philippines	Won vacant Philippines GAB Youth bantamweight title
9	Win	9–0	Ramel Antaran	TKO	5 (10), 1:50	16 Apr 2023	Masbate, Philippines	
8	Win	8–0	Benny Cañete	UD	10	21 Jan 2023	Mandaluyong City College, Mandaluyong, Philippines	Retained PBF bantamweight title
7	Win	7–0	Jonathan Francisco	TKO	2 (8), 1:30	9 Oct 2022	BF Homes Gym, Parañaque, Philippines	Won vacant PBF bantamweight title
6	Win	6–0	Ridick Tablanza	UD	8	31 Jul 2022	Makati, Metro Manila, Philippines	Won vacant LuzProBA bantamweight title
5	Win	5–0	Miller Alapormina	UD	6	14 May 2022	General Trias Sports Park, General Trias, Philippines	
4	Win	4–0	Rolly Dorong	KO	4 (6), 0:14	5 Feb 2022	Bogo, Cebu, Philippines	
3	Win	3–0	Jover Amistoso	TKO	4 (4), 2:49	4 Sep 2021	Urdaneta Cultural Sports Complex, Urdaneta, Philippines	
2	Win	2–0	Jemark Gandao	KO	1 (4)	20 Mar 2021	Biñan Football Stadium, Biñan, Philippines	
1	Win	1–0	Richard Quebec	TKO	1 (4), 1:08	5 Mar 2020	Quibors Boxing Gym, Bacoor, Philippines	

== Titles in boxing ==
=== Regional/International titles ===
- PBF bantamweight champion (118 lbs)
- WBC Asia Continental bantamweight champion (118 lbs)
- OPBF bantamweight champion (118 lbs)

=== Interim regional titles ===
- OPBF interim bantamweight champion (118 lbs)

=== Youth titles ===
- GAB Youth bantamweight champion (118 lbs)
- WBO Asia Pacific Youth bantamweight champion (118 lbs)

== Filmography ==
Year	Film	Role	Other notes
2025	Panindigan: Walang Talo	Himself	Online Documentary – INCTV Dated October 10
