= Jonathan Guzmán =

Dominican boxer

Personal information
- Nickname: Salomon King
- Nationality: Dominican
- Born: Jonathan Guzmán Pena; July 17, 1989 (age 36) Boca Chica, Santo Domingo, Dominican Republic
- Height: 5 ft 5 1/2 in (166 cm)
- Weight: Bantamweight: Super bantamweight

Boxing career
- Reach: 68 1/2 in (174 cm)
- Stance: Orthodox

Boxing record
- Total fights: 30
- Wins: 27
- Win by KO: 26
- Losses: 2
- No contests: 1

Jonathan Guzmán Pena (born July 17, 1989), best known as Jonathan Guzmán, is a Dominican professional boxer who held the IBF junior featherweight title in 2016.

== Professional career ==
Guzmán made his professional debut on December 18, 2011, scoring a fourth-round technical knockout over Alejandro Brito. Fighting almost exclusively in his native Dominican Republic for the next three years, Guzmán would score all of his wins by knockout or stoppage, except for a second-round no contest against Luis Hinojosa on May 18, 2013. Having won five fights in the United States, all by knockout, Guzmán travelled to Japan to face Shingo Wake on July 20, 2016. A late eleventh-round stoppage saw Guzmán win the vacant IBF junior featherweight title, but this reign would be short-lived, as Guzmán lost the title by unanimous decision to Yukinori Oguni on December 31, in his first career defeat.

== Professional boxing record ==
30 fights	27 wins	2 losses
By knockout	26	0
By decision	1	2
No contests	1	

No.	Result	Record	Opponent	Type	Round, time	Date	Location	Notes
30	Win	27–2 (1)	Bernardo Gomez Uribe	TKO	1 (8), 1:52	Aug 29, 2025	Memorial Hall, Melrose	
29	Win	26–2 (1)	Wilner Soto	KO	2 (8), 2:13	Dec 21, 2024	Coco Locos Restaurant, Sports Bar, Sosua	
28	Win	25–2 (1)	Starling Martinez	TKO	7 (8), 2:11	Apr 8, 2022	Pabellon de Esgrima, Centro Olimpico, Santo Domingo	
27	Loss	24–2 (1)	Carlos Jackson	SD	8	Oct 30, 2021	Madison Square Garden Theater, New York City, New York	
26	Win	24–1 (1)	Rodolfo Hernandez Montoya	KO	3 (6), 1:22	Jan 18, 2020	Turning Stone Resort and Casino, Verona, New York	
25	Win	23–1 (1)	Roberto Castaneda	UD	10	Nov 16, 2018	Chesapeake Energy Arena, Oklahoma City, Oklahoma	
24	Loss	22–1 (1)	Yukinori Oguni	UD	12	Dec 31, 2016	Shimazu Arena, Kyoto, Japan	Lost IBF super bantamweight title
23	Win	22–0 (1)	Shingo Wake	TKO	11 (12), 2:16	Jul 20, 2016	Edion Arena, Osaka, Japan	Won vacant IBF super bantamweight title
22	Win	21–0 (1)	Daniel Rosas	RTD	8 (12), 3:00	Apr 29, 2016	Etess Arena, Atlantic City, New Jersey, U.S.	
21	Win	20–0 (1)	Danny Aquino	TKO	9 (10), 1:19	Oct 10, 2015	Memorial Auditorium, Lowell, Massachusetts, U.S.	
20	Win	19–0 (1)	Christian Esquivel	RTD	5 (8), 3:00	May 23, 2015	Agganis Arena, Boston, Massachusetts, U.S.	
19	Win	18–0 (1)	Juan Guzman	TKO	5 (6), 0:41	Feb 26, 2015	Memorial Hall, Melrose, Massachusetts, U.S.	
18	Win	17–0 (1)	Ernesto Guerrero	TKO	2 (8), 2:53	Oct 4, 2014	Foxwoods Resort Casino, Ledyard, Connecticut, U.S.	
17	Win	16–0 (1)	Eury Hernandez	TKO	3 (8), 2:45	Mar 22, 2014	Club Maquiteria, Santo Domingo, Dominican Republic	
16	Win	15–0 (1)	Ramon Emilio Cedano	KO	1 (10), 1:41	Mar 10, 2014	Polideportivo Eleoncio Mercedes, La Romana, Dominican Republic	
15	Win	14–0 (1)	Jose Ruiz	TKO	2 (11), 2:22	Aug 24, 2013	Fiesta Hotel & Casino, Santo Domingo, Dominican Republic	Won vacant WBA Fedelatin bantamweight title
14	Win	13–0 (1)	Geyci Lorenzo	TKO	2 (8), 1:25	Jun 8, 2013	Gimnasio Polideportivo en San Martín de Porres, La Romana, Dominican Republic	
13	NC	12–0 (1)	Luis Hinojosa	NC	2 (10)	May 18, 2013	Club Mauricio Báez, Santo Domingo, Dominican Republic	
12	Win	12–0	Ramon Emilio Cedano	RTD	3 (6), 3:00	Mar 9, 2013	Coliseo de boxeo Carlos "Teo" Cruz, Santo Domingo, Dominican Republic	
11	Win	11–0	Ramon Emilio Cedano	TKO	1 (8), 2:52	Dec 17, 2012	Fiesta Hotel & Casino, Santo Domingo, Dominican Republic	
10	Win	10–0	Emerson Santos Carvalho	KO	6 (10)	Nov 3, 2012	Club La Unión, Colón, Argentina	Won vacant WBC FECARBOX super bantamweight title
9	Win	9–0	Marcos Martinez	KO	1 (10), 2:25	Oct 18, 2012	Club de Leones El Millón, Santo Domingo, Dominican Republic	
8	Win	8–0	Aneudy Matos	TKO	2 (8), 0:24	Sep 28, 2012	Club Casa Puerto Rico, La Romana, Dominican Republic	
7	Win	7–0	Jose Ramon Tejada	TKO	2 (8), 2:13	Aug 15, 2012	Club de Leones El Millón, Santo Domingo, Dominican Republic	
6	Win	6–0	Dinoel Reynoso	TKO	4 (6), 1:21	Aug 12, 2012	Coliseo de boxeo Carlos "Teo" Cruz, Santo Domingo, Dominican Republic	
5	Win	5–0	Eury Hernandez	TKO	2 (6), 2:58	Jun 23, 2012	Club de Leones El Millón, Santo Domingo, Dominican Republic	
4	Win	4–0	Juan Guzman	TKO	1 (6), 1:40	Jun 16, 2012	Club Maquiteria, Santo Domingo Este, Dominican Republic	
3	Win	3–0	Nelson Diaz	TKO	1 (4), 2:05	May 12, 2012	Coliseo Pedro Julio Nolasco, La Romana, Dominican Republic	
2	Win	2–0	Milciades Mosquea	TKO	2 (4), 1:59	Mar 24, 2012	Palacio de los Deportes Virgilio Travieso Soto, Santo Domingo, Dominican Republic	
1	Win	1–0	Alejandro Brito	TKO	4 (4), 2:16	Dec 18, 2011	Club de Villa González, Santiago de los Caballeros, Dominican Republic	Professional debut

Sporting positions
Regional boxing titles
Vacant Title last held by Roman Morales	WBC FECARBOX super bantamweight champion November 3, 2012 – February 2013; Vacated	Vacant Title next held by Hugo Partida
Vacant Title last held by Juan Carlos Payano	WBA Fedelatin bantamweight champion August 24, 2013 – March 2014; Vacated	Vacant Title next held by Luis Hinojosa
World boxing titles
Vacant Title last held by Carl Frampton	IBF super bantamweight champion July 20, 2016 – December 31, 2016	Succeeded by Yukinori Oguni
