= Teiru Kinoshita =

Zainichi Korean boxer (born 1985)

Teiru Kinoshita (born Park Tae-Il on December 17, 1985 in Osaka, Japan) is a Japanese-Korean boxer.

Kinoshita is a former Japanese super flyweight champion.

In 2014, he lost to Zolani Tete for the vacant International Boxing Federation (IBF) super flyweight world title.

He is scheduled to again fight for the IBF super flyweight world title against Jerwin Ancajas on the Manny Pacquiao vs. Jeff Horn undercard. Kinoshita entered the bout on a six-fight win streak and with the IBF's No. 3 in his weight class. He is the top ranked contender for the IBF (with the first and second positions vacant).

== Professional boxing record ==
30 fights	26 wins	3 losses
By knockout	9	2
By decision	17	1
Draws	1	

No.	Result	Record	Opponent	Type	Round, time	Date	Location	Notes
30	Loss	26–3–1	Hiroaki Teshigawara	KO	5 (12), 2:41	14 Jun 2018	Korakuen Hall, Tokyo, Japan	For WBO Asia Pacific bantamweight title
29	Win	26–2–1	Kittipong Jareonroy	TKO	3 (8), 1:30	16 Dec 2017	Art Center, Kobe, Japan	
28	Loss	25–2–1	Jerwin Ancajas	TKO	7 (12), 1:53	2 Jul 2017	Suncorp Stadium, Brisbane, Australia	For IBF super flyweight title
27	Win	25–1–1	Thirayut Sithsaithong	KO	3 (8), 1:20	21 Aug 2016	Sambo Hall, Kobe, Japan	
26	Win	24–1–1	Lookfluke Sithkrupalachai	KO	2 (8), 2:11	17 Apr 2016	Art Center, Kobe, Japan	
25	Win	23–1–1	Nirun Baonok	KO	4 (8), 0:57	6 Dec 2015	Sambo Hall, Kobe, Japan	
24	Win	22–1–1	Tomoya Nawatedani	SD	8	23 Aug 2015	Art Center, Kobe, Japan	
23	Win	21–1–1	Nongdear Sor Bangkharu	TKO	4 (8), 2:31	12 Apr 2015	Art Center, Kobe, Japan	
22	Win	20–1–1	Brukluk Kor Narong Service	KO	2 (8), 2:44	14 Dec 2014	Art Center, Kobe, Japan	
21	Loss	19–1–1	Zolani Tete	UD	12	28 Jul 2014	Portopia Hotel, Kobe, Japan	For vacant IBF super flyweight title
20	Win	19–0–1	Ryūta Otsuka	TD	5 (10), 1:27	24 Nov 2013	Sambo Hall, Kobe, Japan	Unanimous TD; Retained Japanese super flyweight title
19	Win	18–0–1	Junichi Ebisuoka	UD	10	28 Jul 2013	Sambo Hall, Kobe, Japan	Retained Japanese super flyweight title
18	Win	17–0–1	Toyoto Shiraishi	UD	10	31 Mar 2013	Sambo Hall, Kobe, Japan	Retained Japanese super flyweight title
17	Win	16–0–1	Kenji Ōba	UD	10	23 Nov 2012	Sambo Hall, Kobe, Japan	Retained Japanese super flyweight title
16	Win	15–0–1	Atsushi Kakutani	SD	10	22 Jul 2012	Sambo Hall, Kobe, Japan	Retained Japanese super flyweight title
15	Win	14–0–1	Go Onaga	SD	10	27 Mar 2012	Korakuen Hall, Tokyo, Japan	Won vacant Japanese super flyweight title
14	Draw	13–0–1	Go Onaga	TD	4 (8), 1:06	15 Oct 2011	Korakuen Hall, Tokyo, Japan	
13	Win	13–0	Jun'ichirō Sugita	UD	6	5 Jul 2011	Korakuen Hall, Tokyo, Japan	
12	Win	12–0	Arief Blader	TD	6 (8), 1:27	27 Mar 2011	Sambo Hall, Kobe, Japan	Unanimous TD
11	Win	11–0	Jilo Merlin	TKO	4 (8), 1:49	7 Nov 2010	Sambo Hall, Kobe, Japan	
10	Win	10–0	Yudai Matsumoto	SD	8	12 Sep 2010	IMP Hall, Osaka, Japan	
9	Win	9–0	Lee Sung-young	UD	8	23 May 2010	Sambo Hall, Kobe, Japan	
8	Win	8–0	Yuki Murai	SD	8	6 Dec 2009	Sambo Hall, Kobe, Japan	
7	Win	7–0	Yuki Takemoto	TKO	7 (8), 1:25	26 Jul 2009	Sambo Hall, Kobe, Japan	
6	Win	6–0	Takamitsu Melon Ōtsuka	UD	6	36 Apr 2009	Sambo Hall, Kobe, Japan	
5	Win	5–0	Petchklongphai Sor Thantip	KO	2 (8), 2:48	28 Dec 2008	City Sogo Gym, Takasago, Japan	
4	Win	4–0	Eiji Nimura	UD	6	2 Nov 2008	Abeno Ward Center, Osaka, Japan	
3	Win	3–0	Ginzō Hanaki	UD	6	15 Sep 2008	Sambo Hall, Kobe, Japan	
2	Win	2–0	Mamoru Honda	UD	4	29 Jun 2008	Sambo Hall, Kobe, Japan	
1	Win	1–0	Akihiro Kanemoto	UD	4	11 May 2008	Sangyo Koryu Center, Akashi, Japan	
