= Ryosuke Iwasa =

Japanese boxer (born 1989)

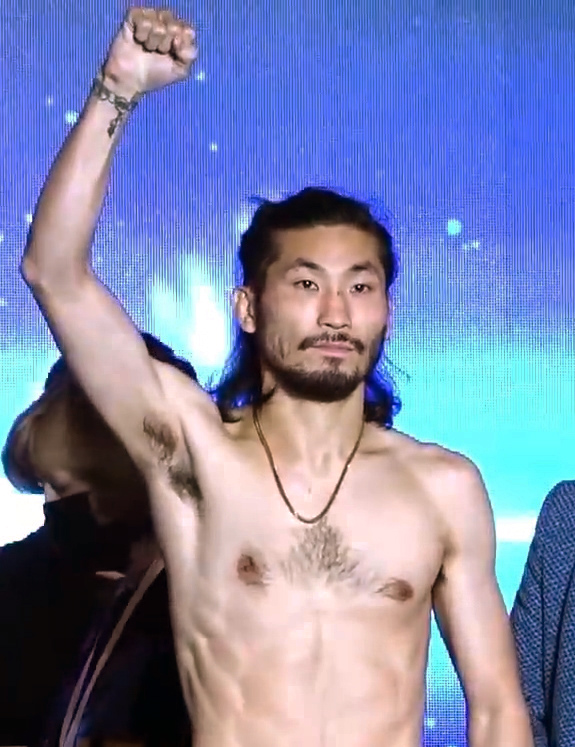
- Iwasa in 2021

Personal information
- Born: 岩佐亮佑; December 26, 1989 (age 36) Kashiwa, Chiba, Japan
- Height: 171 cm (5 ft 7 in)
- Weight: Bantamweight; Super-bantamweight

Boxing career
- Reach: 180 cm (71 in)
- Stance: Southpaw

Boxing record
- Total fights: 33
- Wins: 28
- Win by KO: 18
- Losses: 5

Ryosuke Iwasa (岩佐 亮佑, Iwasa Ryōsuke; born December 26, 1989) is a Japanese professional boxer. He held the IBF super-bantamweight title from 2017 to 2018 and the interim version from 2019 to April 2021. He also challenged for the unified WBA (Super) and IBF super-bantamweight titles in April 2021.

== Career ==
Iwasa turned pro in 2008, after winning national titles as an amateur and accruing a 60–6 record. Iwasa was considered a highly touted prospect until he lost a bout for the Japanese bantamweight title against future world champion Shinsuke Yamanaka. Iwasa would eventually win that title, as well as the OPBF title.

Iwasa's first world title fight would come against Lee Haskins for the interim IBF bantamweight title in June 2015. Iwasa would be stopped in round 6 after being knocked down by a left hook from Haskins. Following that loss, Iwasa moved to the super bantamweight division.

In his fifth fight at that weight, Iwasa defeated Yukinori Oguni for the IBF super bantamweight title. Iwasa battered the defending champion, dropping him three times before the fight was stopped in round 6.

In his first title defense, Iwasa faced Ernesto Saulong. Iwasa retained his IBF super bantamweight title for the first time, via unanimous decision.

His second title defense came against Irishman T. J. Doheny. Doheny was the busier man on the night, outjabbing Iwasa for most of the fight. However, Iwasa seemed to be more precise and causing more visible damage to Doheny. Even to Doheny's slight surprise, all three judges scored the fight in his favor, leaving Iwasa without his belt in only his second defense.

Iwasa bounced back in the next fight, called as an IBF final eliminator, by defeating Cesar Juarez via technical decision. Both fighters clashed heads in the second round that opened cuts for both, but it was Juarez who took more damage in the remainder of the fight. The fight was called off in the tenth round, and since Iwasa was up on two of the scorecards, he got awarded the victory.

In his next fight, Iwasa fought Marlon Tapales for the interim IBF super bantamweight belt. Iwasa was ranked #1 by the IBF at the time, while Tapales was #3 at super bantamweight. Iwasa outboxed Tapales for most of the fight, before rocking him with a well-placed overhand left in the eleventh round. Tapales beat the count, but was stumbling when the referee asked if he could continue, which prompted the referee to stop the fight and award Iwasa the TKO win.

== Professional boxing record ==
33 fights	28 wins	5 losses
By knockout	18	3
By decision	10	2

No.	Result	Record	Opponent	Type	Round, time	Date	Location	Notes
33	Loss	28–5	Japhethlee Llamido	UD	8	Apr 15, 2023	Paradise City Plaza, Incheon, South Korea	
32	Win	28–4	Genesis Servania	KO	4 (10), 1:46	Oct 25, 2021	Korakuen Hall, Tokyo, Japan	
31	Loss	27–4	Murodjon Akhmadaliev	TKO	5 (12), 1:30	Apr 3, 2021	Humo Arena, Tashkent, Uzbekistan	For WBA (Super) and IBF super-bantamweight titles
30	Win	27–3	Marlon Tapales	TKO	11 (12), 1:09	Dec 7, 2019	Barclays Center, New York City, New York, U.S.	Won IBF interim super-bantamweight title
29	Win	26–3	Cesar Juarez	TD	9 (12), 3:00	Feb 16, 2019	Microsoft Theater, Los Angeles, California, U.S.	Unanimous TD after Juarez cut from accidental head clash
28	Loss	25–3	TJ Doheny	UD	12	Aug 16, 2018	Kokugikan, Tokyo, Japan	Lost IBF super-bantamweight title
27	Win	25–2	Ernesto Saulong	UD	12	Mar 1, 2018	Kokugikan, Tokyo, Japan	Retained IBF super-bantamweight title
26	Win	24–2	Yukinori Oguni	TKO	6 (12), 2:16	Sep 13, 2017	EDION Arena Osaka, Osaka, Japan	Won IBF super-bantamweight title
25	Win	23–2	Glenn Medura	TKO	3 (8), 2:55	Mar 2, 2017	Kokugikan, Tokyo, Japan	
24	Win	22–2	Aekkawee Kaewmanee	KO	3 (10), 2:17	Jul 12, 2016	Korakuen Hall, Tokyo, Japan	
23	Win	21–2	Dennis Tubieron	KO	7 (10), 1:42	Feb 6, 2016	Korakuen Hall, Tokyo, Japan	
22	Win	20–2	Marlon Arcilla	TD	5 (10), 0:15	Nov 24, 2015	Kokugikan, Tokyo, Japan	
21	Loss	19–2	Lee Haskins	TKO	6 (12), 2:10	Jun 13, 2015	Whitchurch Sports Centre, Bristol, England	For IBF interim bantamweight title
20	Win	19–1	Ricardo Roa	TKO	2 (10), 2:55	Feb 18, 2015	Korakuen Hall, Tokyo, Japan	
19	Win	18–1	Rommy Wassar	KO	2 (10), 1:03	Sep 6, 2014	Korakuen Hall, Tokyo, Japan	
18	Win	17–1	Richard Pumicpic	MD	12	Mar 25, 2014	Korakuen Hall, Tokyo, Japan	Retained OPBF bantamweight title
17	Win	16–1	Hiroki Shiino	TKO	5 (12), 2:52	Dec 6, 2013	Kokugikan, Tokyo, Japan	Won OPBF bantamweight title
16	Win	15–1	Jecker Buhawe	UD	10	Jul 6, 2013	Korakuen Hall, Tokyo, Japan	
15	Win	14–1	Mark John Yap	UD	10	Mar 2, 2013	Korakuen Hall, Tokyo, Japan	
14	Win	13–1	David De La Mora	UD	10	Oct 27, 2012	Tokyo International Forum, Tokyo, Japan	
13	Win	12–1	Kentaro Masuda	TKO	7 (10), 1:49	Jul 7, 2012	Korakuen Hall, Tokyo, Japan	Retained Japanese bantamweight title
12	Win	11–1	Yuki Murai	KO	1 (10), 3:00	Mar 3, 2012	Korakuen Hall, Tokyo, Japan	Retained Japanese bantamweight title
11	Win	10–1	Jerope Mercado	UD	10	Nov 18, 2011	Korakuen Hall, Tokyo, Japan	Won Japanese bantamweight title
10	Win	9–1	Rasmanudin	KO	2 (8), 0:41	Aug 6, 2011	Korakuen Hall, Tokyo, Japan	
9	Loss	8–1	Shinsuke Yamanaka	TKO	10 (10), 1:28	Mar 5, 2011	Korakuen Hall, Tokyo, Japan	For Japanese bantamweight title
8	Win	8–0	Kinshiro Usui	TKO	4 (8), 1:08	Sep 5, 2010	Korakuen Hall, Tokyo, Japan	
7	Win	7–0	Yuki Sato	TKO	2 (8), 2:14	Apr 15, 2010	Korakuen Hall, Tokyo, Japan	
6	Win	6–0	Marvin Tampus	UD	8	Jan 16, 2010	Korakuen Hall, Tokyo, Japan	
5	Win	5–0	Falazona Fidal	TKO	7 (8), 1:04	Sep 5, 2009	Korakuen Hall, Tokyo, Japan	
4	Win	4–0	Worawut Muangsima	KO	2 (8), 1:58	May 16, 2009	Korakuen Hall, Tokyo, Japan	
3	Win	3–0	Ginzo Hanaki	TKO	1 (6), 2:11	Feb 21, 2009	Korakuen Hall, Tokyo, Japan	
2	Win	2–0	Edgar Allende	UD	6	Oct 16, 2008	Yoyogi First Gym, Tokyo, Japan	
1	Win	1–0	Shinya Takahashi	TKO	5 (6), 0:43	Aug 2, 2008	Korakuen Hall, Tokyo, Japan	

== See also ==
- List of world super-bantamweight boxing champions
- List of Japanese boxing world champions
- Boxing in Japan

Achievements
Preceded by Yukinori Oguni	IBF Super Bantamweight Champion; September 13, 2017 - August 16, 2018	Succeeded by TJ Doheny
