= Marlon Tapales =

Filipino boxer (born 1992)

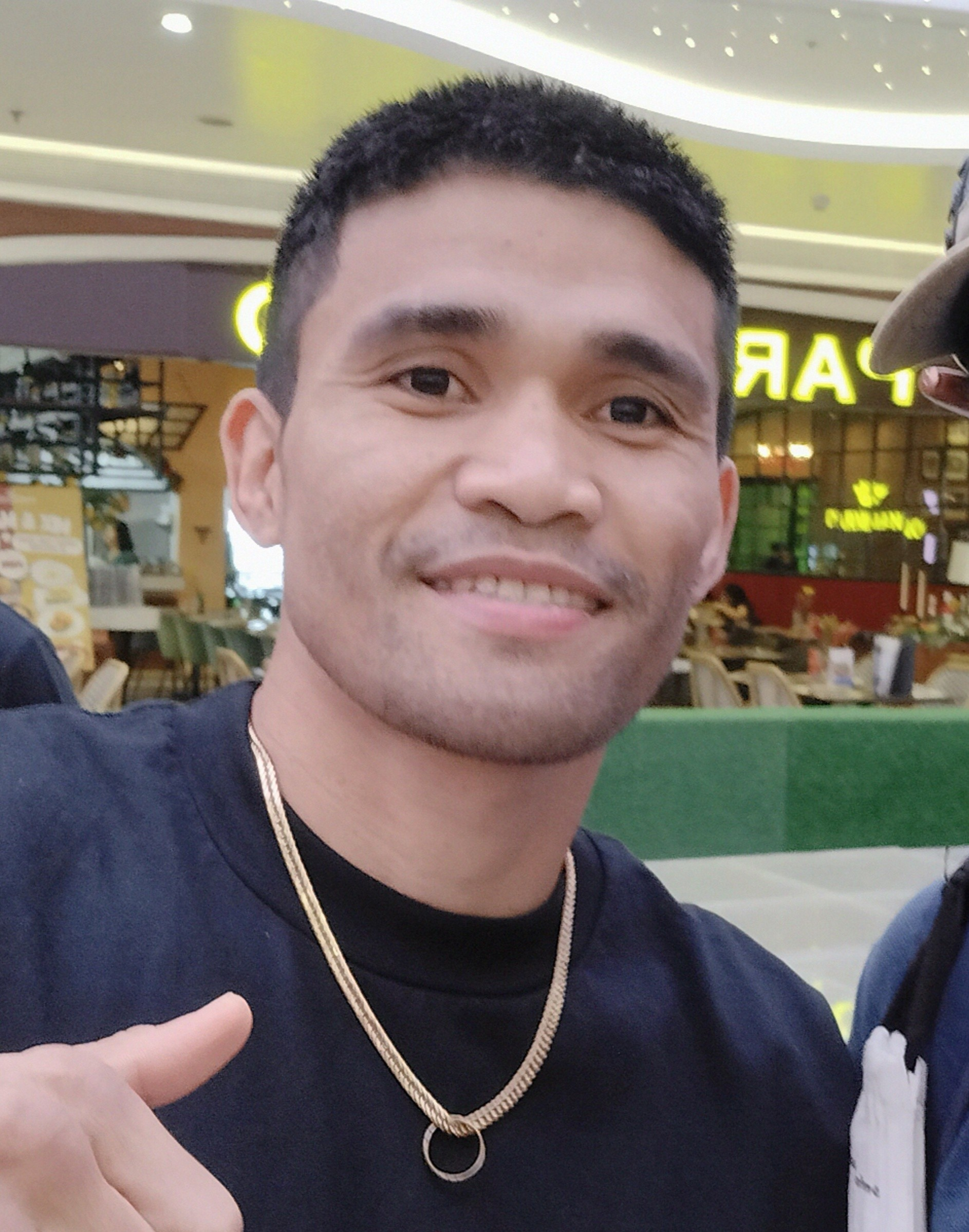
- Tapales in 2025

Personal information
- Nickname: Nightmare
- Born: March 23, 1992 (age 34) Tubod, Lanao del Norte, Philippines
- Height: 5 ft 4 in (163 cm)
- Weight: Light flyweight; Flyweight; Super flyweight; Bantamweight; Super bantamweight; Featherweight; Super featherweight

Boxing career
- Reach: 65 in (165 cm)
- Stance: Southpaw

Boxing record
- Total fights: 47
- Wins: 42
- Win by KO: 23
- Losses: 5

Marlon Tañan Tapales (born March 23, 1992) is a Filipino professional boxer. He has held world championships in two weight classes, including the World Boxing Organization (WBO) bantamweight title from 2016 to 2017 and the unified World Boxing Association (WBA) (Super version) and International Boxing Federation (IBF) super-bantamweight titles in 2023.

== Professional career ==
=== Tapales vs. Sor Singyu ===
In 2016, Tapales defeated WBO bantamweight champion Pungluang Sor Singyu by KO in the eleventh round and won his first world title.

=== Tapales vs. Iwasa ===
On 7 December 2019, Tapales fought Ryosuke Iwasa for the vacant IBF super bantamweight title. During the fight Tapales suffered a concussion because of accidental head-clash. But the fight continued and Iwasa won via an eleventh-round TKO.

=== Tapales vs. Teshigawara ===
On 11 December 2021, Tapales fought Teshigawara, ranked #3 by the IBF at super bantamweight. Tapales managed to stop Teshigawara within two rounds.

=== Tapales vs. Akhmadaliev ===
On 8 April 2023, Tapales beat Murodjon Akhmadaliev via split decision to win the WBA (Super) and IBF super-bantamweight world titles and became a 2 weight world champion.

=== Tapales vs. Inoue ===
On August 21, 2023, it was reported that Tapales had entered into negotiations with the unified WBC and WBO super bantamweight champion Naoya Inoue for an undisputed title bout. The fight is expected to take place at Ariake Arena in Tokyo, Japan on 26 December 2023, and would be broadcast by ESPN+ in the United States. Tapales lost the fight by 10th-round knockout against Inoue earning his fourth defeat. Despite the loss, however, Tapales made history for being the first Filipino boxer to fight for undisputed in the 4-belt era, and the second Asian to do so.

==== Thrilla in Manila: 50th Anniversary ====
After three consecutive victories Tapales is scheduled to fight Venezuelan boxer Fernando Toro on October 29, 2025, with the collaborations of Blow by Blow, MP Promotions, and the International Boxing Association setting the event billed as Thrilla in Manila: 50th Anniversary. It is meant as the 50th anniversary commemoration of the original Thrilla in Manila 1975 fight between Muhammad Ali and Joe Frazier at the Araneta Coliseum, Quezon city, Philippines.

== Professional boxing record ==
47 fights	42 wins	5 losses
By knockout	23	3
By decision	19	2

No.	Result	Record	Opponent	Type	Round, time	Date	Location	Notes
47	Win	42–5	Nirun Baonok	KO	2 (8)	Sep 26, 2026	UH-FCC, Pattaya, Chonburi Province, Thailand	Won vacant WBF (Foundation) International featherweight title
46	Loss	41–5	Yukinori Oguni	UD	10	Apr 3, 2026	Korakuen Hall, Tokyo, Japan	
45	Win	41–4	Fernando Toro	KO	6 (8), 2:31	Oct 29, 2025	Araneta Coliseum, Quezon City, National Capital Region, Philippines	
44	Win	40–4	Jon Jon Jet	RTD	3 (10), 3:00	Apr 27, 2025	Venue 88, General Santos, South Cotabato, Philippines	Won vacant WBC International Silver super-bantamweight title
43	Win	39–4	Saurabh Kumar	UD	10	Sep 7, 2024	Olympic Stadium, Phnom Penh, Cambodia	Retained WBC-ABCO Continental super-bantamweight title
42	Win	38–4	Nattapong Jankaew	KO	1 (10), 2:15	May 10, 2024	Midas Hotel and Casino, Pasay, National Capital Region, Philippines	Won vacant WBC-ABCO Continental super-bantamweight title
41	Loss	37–4	Naoya Inoue	KO	10 (12), 1:02	Dec 26, 2023	Ariake Arena, Tokyo, Japan	Lost WBA (Super) and IBF super-bantamweight titles; For WBC, WBO, and vacant The Ring super-bantamweight titles
40	Win	37–3	Murodjon Akhmadaliev	SD	12	Apr 8, 2023	Boeing Center at Tech Port, San Antonio, Texas, U.S.	Won WBA (Super) and IBF super-bantamweight titles
39	Win	36–3	Jose Estrella	KO	2 (8), 1:39	May 14, 2022	Dignity Health Sports Park, Carson, California, U.S.	
38	Win	35–3	Hiroaki Teshigawara	TKO	2 (12), 0:06	Dec 11, 2021	Dignity Health Sports Park, Carson, California, U.S.	
37	Win	34–3	Eden Sonsona	TKO	2 (10), 0:46	Nov 21, 2020	Sanman Gym, General Santos, South Cotabato, Philippines	
36	Loss	33–3	Ryosuke Iwasa	TKO	11 (12), 1:09	Dec 7, 2019	Barclays Center, Brooklyn, New York, U.S.	For vacant IBF interim super-bantamweight title
35	Win	33–2	Roberto Castaneda	KO	3 (10), 1:37	Jun 1, 2019	Soboba Casino, San Jacinto, California, U.S.	
34	Win	32–2	Fernando Vargas Parra	RTD	5 (10), 3:00	Feb 16, 2019	Microsoft Theater, Los Angeles, California, U.S.	
33	Win	31–2	Goodluck Mrema	KO	1 (10), 2:10	Sep 30, 2018	SM North EDSA Skydome, Quezon City, National Capital Region, Philippines	
32	Win	30–2	Shohei Omori	TKO	11 (12), 0:16	Apr 23, 2017	Edion Arena Osaka, Osaka, Japan	WBO bantamweight title at stake only for Omori after Tapales missed weight
31	Win	29–2	Pungluang Sor Singyu	KO	11 (12), 0:30	Jul 27, 2016	Ayutthaya City Park, Ayutthaya, Thailand	Won WBO bantamweight title
30	Win	28–2	Shohei Omori	TKO	2 (12), 1:35	Dec 16, 2015	Shimazu Arena, Kyoto, Japan	
29	Win	27–2	Jecker Buhawe	UD	10	Jan 31, 2015	USeP Gymnasium, Davao City, Davao del Sur, Philippines	
28	Win	26–2	Fadhili Majiha	UD	12	Jun 28, 2014	Mindanao Civic Center Gymnasium, Tubod, Lanao del Norte, Philippines	Retained WBO Asia Pacific bantamweight title
27	Win	25–2	Hayato Kimura	TD	5 (10), 1:40	Apr 13, 2014	Sangyo Hall, Kanazawa, Ishikawa, Japan	
26	Win	24–2	Galih Susanto	UD	10	Feb 8, 2014	Almendras Gym, Davao City, Davao del Sur, Philippines	
25	Win	23–2	Fredirex Rodriguez	UD	12	Aug 1, 2013	Waterfront Hotel & Casino, Barangay Lahug, Cebu City, Cebu, Philippines	Won WBO Asia Pacific bantamweight title
24	Win	22–2	Ruben Manakane	TKO	4 (10), 2:17	May 26, 2013	Sangyo Hall, Kanazawa, Ishikawa, Japan	
23	Loss	21–2	David Sánchez	MD	12	Feb 23, 2013	Gimnasio del Estado, Hermosillo, Sonora, Mexico	For vacant WBC interim Silver super flyweight title
22	Win	21–1	Rasmanudin	KO	2 (8), 1:10	Oct 20, 2012	SM Mall of Asia Arena, Pasay, National Capital Region, Philippines	
21	Win	20–1	Rex Olisa	TKO	3 (10), 1:41	Nov 17, 2011	Flores Auditorium, Barangay Maranding, Lala, Lanao del Norte, Philippines	
20	Win	19–1	Martin Mubiru	UD	10	Oct 9, 2011	Panphil B. Frasco Memorial Sports Complex, Liloan, Cebu, Philippines	
19	Win	18–1	Manot Comput	KO	4 (10), 1:50	Jun 25, 2011	Mindanao Civic Center Gymnasium, Tubod, Lanao del Norte, Philippines	
18	Win	17–1	Alejandro Solorio	MD	6	May 6, 2011	Mandalay Bay Resort & Casino, Las Vegas, Nevada, U.S.	
17	Win	16–1	Charlie Cabilla	KO	1 (10), 2:46	Feb 6, 2011	Dalaguete Sports Complex, Dalaguete, Cebu, Philippines	
16	Win	15–1	Rey Megrino	UD	10	Nov 5, 2010	Ynares Sports Arena, Pasig, National Capital Region, Philippines	
15	Win	14–1	Richard Olisa	UD	10	Oct 6, 2010	Glan, Sarangani, Philippines	
14	Win	13–1	Charlie Cabilla	UD	12	Jun 12, 2010	Vitaliano D. Agan Coliseum, Barangay Tetuan, Zamboanga City, Zamboanga del Norte, Philippines	Retained Philippines GAB light-flyweight title
13	Win	12–1	Warlito Parrenas	TKO	7 (12), 1:19	Apr 9, 2010	Mindanao Civic Center Gymnasium, Tubod, Lanao del Norte, Philippines	Won Philippines GAB light-flyweight title
12	Win	11–1	Randy Petalcorin	TKO	2 (8), 2:50	Jan 23, 2010	Cuneta Astrodome, Pasay, National Capital Region, Philippines	
11	Win	10–1	Armando de la Cruz	UD	10	Nov 8, 2009	Barangay Maranding, Lala, Lanao del Norte, Philippines	
10	Win	9–1	Jerson Mancio	UD	10	Aug 29, 2009	Provincial Capitol Grounds, Cagayan de Oro, Misamis Oriental, Philippines	
9	Loss	8–1	Brix Ray	RTD	6 (10), 3:00	May 30, 2009	City Auditorium, Surigao City, Surigao del Norte, Philippines	For Philippines Boxing Federation (PBF) flyweight title
8	Win	8–0	Michael Rodriguez	UD	10	Apr 19, 2009	Mahinog Gym, Mahinog, Camiguin, Philippines	
7	Win	7–0	Rodel Tejares	UD	10	Mar 25, 2009	Barangay Maranding, Lala, Lanao del Norte, Philippines	
6	Win	6–0	Ryan Tampus	UD	8	Jan 15, 2009	Maasim, Sarangani, Philippines	
5	Win	5–0	Charlie Lamila	TKO	1 (6), 2:37	Dec 27, 2008	Christ the King Gym, Barangay Maranding, Lala, Lanao del Norte, Philippines	
4	Win	4–0	Freddie Martinez	UD	6	Nov 19, 2008	Barangay Maranding, Lala, Lanao del Norte, Philippines	
3	Win	3–0	Jherom Tuyor	UD	6	Sep 20, 2008	Teachers Gym, Dipolog, Zamboanga del Norte, Philippines	
2	Win	2–0	Sherwin McDo Lungay	MD	4	Aug 23, 2008	BS Gym, Barangay Maranding, Lala, Lanao del Norte, Philippines	
1	Win	1–0	Nestor Gamolo	TKO	1 (4), 0:54	Jul 18, 2008	Barangay Maranding, Lala, Lanao del Norte, Philippines	

== Titles in boxing ==
=== Major world titles ===
- WBO bantamweight champion (118 lbs)
- WBA super bantamweight champion (122 lbs)
- IBF super bantamweight champion (122 lbs)

=== Regional/International titles ===
- Philippines GAB light-flyweight champion (108 lbs)
- WBO Asia Pacific bantamweight champion (118 lbs)
- WBC-ABCO-Continental super-bantamweight champion (122 lbs)
- WBC International Silver super-bantamweight title champion (122 lbs)
- WBF (Foundation) International featherweight champion (126 lbs)

== See also ==
- List of southpaw stance boxers
- List of world bantamweight boxing champions
- List of world super-bantamweight boxing champions
- List of Filipino boxing world champions

Sporting positions
World boxing titles
Preceded by Pungluang Sor Singyu	WBO bantamweight champion July 17, 2016 – April 22, 2017; Stripped	Succeeded by Zolani Tete promoted from interim status
Preceded by Murodjon Akhmadaliev	WBA super-bantamweight champion Super title April 8 – December 26, 2023	Succeeded by Naoya Inoue
Preceded by Murodjon Akhmadaliev	IBF super-bantamweight champion April 8 – December 26, 2023	Succeeded by Naoya Inoue
