= Oriental and Pacific Boxing Federation =

Boxing organization

- Abbreviation: OPBF
- Formation: 1952
- Type: Federation of national professional boxing commissions
- Headquarters: Japan
- Location: Bunkyo, Tokyo, Japan
- Region served: Asia and Oceania
- Members: 15 national commissions and 3 regional commissions
- Official language: English
- Affiliations: World Boxing Council
- Website: www.opbf.info
- Formerly called: Oriental Boxing Federation

The Oriental and Pacific Boxing Federation (OPBF) is a professional boxing organization that sanctions title fights in the Asian and Pacific region.

== History ==
Oriental boxing started in the Philippines in 1946 after the Spanish-American War. While America was stationed in the Philippines, boxing began to build up in popularity due to American influence. Many Filipinos who were inspired by boxing moved to Honolulu, Hawaii to continue their careers.

Yujiro Watanabe of Japan laid important groundwork in developing the sport in Japan and bridging language and cultural barriers with neighboring countries. Watanabe came to America in 1911 to box and returned to Japan in 1921 to form one of the first boxing groups in Asia, known as the Japan Club. This club allowed boxing to gain more popularity in Japan during the post-war years.

The OPBF was later formed in 1954 by the Japanese, Korean, and Filipino boxing commissions. It was originally named the Orient Boxing Federation but changed to the Oriental and Pacific Boxing Federation when the Australian National Boxing Federation joined in 1977. In 1963, Australia, New Zealand and the Oceania countries were approved for membership. In November 1977, the organization was officially renamed to Oriental and Pacific Boxing Federation. The organization headquarters were moved from Australia to Japan in 2018.

The OPBF helped form the World Boxing Council in 1963 and is currently affiliated with that organization.

In January 2009, women's championships were established, across eleven weight classes (from atomweight to welterweight). Initially, women's title fights were contested in ten-round bouts, which was reduced to eight rounds in 2012.

On 30 March 2016, the OPBF Silver Championship was established, following a dispute between the Japanese and Philippines boxing commissions on whether an interim title should be established. WBC chairman Mauricio Suleiman suggested naming the title "Silver" to avoid detracting any prestige from the full title. Despite this, the JBC announced a policy of not allowing OPBF Silver matches to be contested in Japan.

In November 2018, the OPBF announced the establishment of domestic OPBF titles, which would certify national champions. The first OPBF national champion was crowned on 9 December 2018, when Dao Nguyen Anh Tuan won the OPBF Vietnam super lightweight title.

== Members ==
15 national commissions and 3 regional commissions (Hong Kong, Guam and Hawaii).

- Australia
- China
- Fiji
- Guam
- Hawaii
- Hong Kong
- Indonesia
- India
- Japan
- South Korea
- Mongolia
- New Zealand
- Philippines
- Papua New Guinea
- Republic of China
- Samoa
- Tonga
- Thailand

== Controversies ==
The OPBF ratings have been criticized numerous times. The ratings released in January 2005 had the undefeated #1 super flyweight Z Gorres passed up by three fighters, including a previously unranked Prosper Matsuura jumping to #3, after an impressive win. Additionally, the undefeated Reynaldo Bautista dropped from #4 to #5 after a defense of his WBO Asia Pacific bantamweight title. The previously unranked Japanese fighter Jun Toriumi catapulted to the #1 spot and won the title soon after.

The following year, a new batch of ratings drew further criticism. WBO Asia Pacific super featherweight champion Czar Amonsot, who was previously ranked #3, dropped out of the top 10 after knocking out Victor Mausul for the title and defeating Cristian Favela. Unranked Jimrex Jaca was moved to #1. Apart from this, former OPBF super featherweight champion Randy Suico had relinquished his title to move up to lightweight, and was immediately ranked at #1 in his new weight class in the new rankings. The previous #1, Shunsuke Ito, had just won the Japanese lightweight title by stopping his opponent in the second round and was in line for an OPBF title shot against reigning champion Chikashi Inada.

In September 2017, undefeated Filipino prospect Edward Heno won the vacant OPBF light flyweight title on his second attempt. However, he was stripped of the belt and dropped to number four in the rankings after he was unable to defend it at that year's OPBF convention in Puerto Princesa in November, even though the winner of a vacant belt normally gets 90 days to defend it.

== Current OPBF title holders ==
=== Male ===
Weight class:	Champion:	Reign began:
Minimumweight	(Japan) Takeshi Ishii	25 September 2024
Light-flyweight	vacant	
Flyweight	(Japan) Jukiya Iimura	18 January 2025
Super-flyweight	(Japan) Aoi Yokoyama	29 March 2025
Bantamweight	(Philippines) Kenneth Llover	24 March 2025
Super-bantamweight	(Japan) Kazuki Nakajima	22 February 2024
Featherweight	(Japan) Mikito Nakano	7 September 2024
Super-featherweight	(Japan) Yamato Hata	1 June 2024
Lightweight	(Japan) Shu Utsuki	19 June 2024
Super-lightweight	(Japan) Daishi Nagata	5 December 2022
Welterweight	(Japan) Jin Sasaki	16 May 2024
Super-welterweight	(Japan) Takeshi Inoue	5 November 2022
Middleweight	Delio	26 juli 2026
Super-middleweight	(Japan) Yuki Nonaka	6 April 2024
Light-heavyweight	vacant	
Cruiserweight	vacant	
Heavyweight	vacant	

=== Female ===
Weight class:	Champion:	Reign began:
Atomweight	(Japan) Eri Matsuda	1 December 2018
Minimumweight	(Japan) Sana Hazuki	17 November 2019
Light-flyweight	(Japan) Shione Ogata	14 April 2019
Flyweight	(Japan) Chaoz Minowa	13 December 2016
Super-flyweight	(Japan) Terumi Nuki	22 April 2017
Bantamweight	vacant	
Super-bantamweight	vacant	
Featherweight	(Japan) Wakako Fujiwara	23 July 2018
Super-featherweight	Laura Akram	12 March 2026
Lightweight	vacant	
Super-lightweight	not inaugurated	
Welterweight	not inaugurated	
Super-welterweight	not inaugurated	
Middleweight	not inaugurated	
Super-middleweight	not inaugurated	
Light-heavyweight	not inaugurated	
Cruiserweight	not inaugurated	
Heavyweight	not inaugurated	

== Other regional WBC federations ==
- North American Boxing Federation (NABF)
- European Boxing Union (EBU)
- Asian Boxing Council (ABCO)
- African Boxing Union (ABU)
- Caribbean Boxing Federation (CABOFE)
- Central American Boxing Federation (FECARBOX)
- CIS and Slovenian Boxing Bureau (CISBB)
- South American Boxing Federation (FESUBOX)

== See also ==
- Australian National Boxing Federation
