= Yoshiki Takei =

Japanese boxer and kickboxer (born 1996)

- Born: 武居由樹; July 12, 1996 (age 30); Tokyo, Japan
- Height: 1.70 m (5 ft 7 in)
- Weight: 55.0 kg (121.3 lb; 8.66 st)
- Division: Bantamweight; Super bantamweight
- Style: Kickboxing, Boxing
- Stance: Southpaw
- Fighting out of: Tokyo, Japan
- Team: Ohashi Gym (2020 - Present); POWER OF DREAM (2006 - 2020)
- Trainer: Akira Yaegashi (boxing); Seiichi Furukawa (kickboxing)
- Years active: 2014 - present

Professional boxing record
- Total: 13
- Wins: 12
- By knockout: 9
- Losses: 1

Kickboxing record
- Total: 25
- Wins: 23
- By knockout: 16
- Losses: 2
- By knockout: 0

Other information
- Website: https://yoshikitakei.com/
- Boxing record from BoxRec

Yoshiki Takei (武居由樹; born 12 July 1996) is a Japanese professional boxer and former kickboxer, who held the WBO bantamweight title from 2024 to 2025.

As a professional kickboxer, he held the K-1 Super Bantamweight Championship from 2017 until 2020, and was the 2017 and 2019 K-1 Super Bantamweight Grand Prix winner. At the time of his retirement from the sport of kickboxing, on December 9, 2020, Takei was ranked as the best fighter at 55 kg (122 lbs) and the eight best pound for pound fighter in the world.

== Kickboxing career ==
=== Early career ===
==== Career beginnings ====
Takei made his professional debut against Tasuku at Krush.47 on November 9, 2014. He won the fight by a first-round knockout, stopping Tasuku with strikes to the body at the 2:33 minute mark of the opening round. Takei would then suffer two consecutive defeates, which would prove to be the only two losses of his professional kickboxing career. He first lost a majority decision to Tenma Sano at Krush.49 on January 4, 2015, which was followed by a majority decision loss to Haruma Saikyo at K-1 World GP 2015 -55kg Championship Tournament on April 19, 2015.

Despite only amassing a 1–2 record, Takei was given the chance to challenge the WINDY KICK super flyweight champion Shuto Hagiwara at WINDY Super Fight 2015 on August 16, 2015. He captured the title by a first-round technical knockout, after he had knocked Hagiwara down three times inside of a single round.

Takei faced Yusho Kamemoto at Krush.59 on October 4, 2015. He won the fight by unanimous decision, with two scorecards of 30–28 and one scorecard of 30–27. Takei next faced Katsuhiro at Krush.61 on December 4, 2015. He knocked Katsuhiro out with a left hook to the body after just 51 seconds. Takei extended his winning streak to three consecutive fights with a narrow unanimous decision victory against Taito Gunji at Krush.63 on February 5, 2016.

==== Krush Super Bantamweight champion ====
Takei took part in the 2016 Krush Super Bantamweight tournament, held to crown the inaugural Krush Bantamweight champion. Takei was booked to face Ryusei in the tournament semifinals on April 10, 2016. He won the fight by a second-round knockout, flooring his opponent with a left uppercut in the final minute of the second round, which left Ryusei unable to beat the eight count. Takei advanced to the tournament finals, held on June 12, 2016, where he faced the former WPMF and J-NETWORK super bantamweight champion Yuki Ueba. He made quick work of Ueba, stopping him with a right uppercut at the midway point of the opening round.

After capturing his second professional title, Takei was booked to face Yuichiro Ito in a non-title bout at GRACHAN 25 x BFC Vol. 2 on October 10, 2016. He won the fight by unanimous decision, with scores of 30–27, 30–26 and 30–28. Takei made his first and only Krush title defense against Ryusei, whom he head previously beaten by stoppage in the quarterfinals of the bantamweight tournament, at Krush.71 on December 18, 2016. He won the rematch by a third-round technical knockout, after knocking Ryusei down thrice in the last round of the bout.

=== K-1 Super Bantamweight champion ===
==== 2017 Super bantamweight World Grand Prix ====
Takei participated in the 2017 K-1 World GP Super Bantamweight (-55 kg) World Grand Prix, which was held on April 22, 2017. He was scheduled to face Antonio Orden in the quarterfinals of the one-day tournament, while the other three fights pitted Keisuke Ishida against Charles Bongiovanni, Nobuchika Terado against Jamie Whelan and Kenji Kubo against Son Dachen. Takei won the fight by a third-round technical knockout. He first knocked Orden down with a strike to the body, before forcing a referee stoppage with a flurry of punches at the 2:31 minute mark of the final round. Orden was given a verbal warning in the third round, after hitting Takei with an elbow in the clinch.

Takei advanced to the tournament semifinals, where he faced Keisuke Ishida. He first knocked Ishida down with a left straight, before finishing him with repeated right hooks at the midway point of the first round. Takei faced the former RISE bantamweight champion Kenji Kubo in the finals of the Grand Prix. He won the fight by a clear unanimous decision, with all three judges scoring the bout 30–27 in his favor. Aside from the tournament title, Takei also captured the vacant K-1 Super Bantamweight (55 kg) Championship. A month later, on May 22, 2017, he vacated the Krush Bantamweight Championship.

==== Title reign ====
Takei faced the "Legend of Heroes" featherweight champion Namito Izawa in a non-title bout at K-1 WORLD GP 2017 -67kg World Tournament on September 18, 2017. He knocked his opponent down with a head kick in the third round, before knocking him down twice more with flurries of punches, which resulted in an automatic technical knockout victory for him. Takei then faced Victor Saravia in another non-title bout at K-1 WORLD GP 2017 Heavyweight World Tournament on November 23, 2017, in his fifth and final fight of the year. He made quick work of Saravia, winning the fight by a 98-second spinning back kick knockout. At the annual "K-1 awards" held on January 14, 2018, Takei was named the 2017 "Fighter of the Year".

Takei made his first K-1 Super Bantamweight Championship defense against Kenji Kubo at K-1 World GP 2018: K'FESTA.1 on March 21, 2018. He previously beat Kubo in the finals of 2017 K-1 super bantamweight tournament to capture the vacant title. Takei won the rematch by a first-round knockout. He first knocked Kubo down with a right hook, before knocking him out with a second right hook soon after.

Takei faced the ISKA, WKN and WBC Muaythai champion Akram Hamidi in a non-title bout at K-1 World GP 2018: inaugural Cruiserweight Championship Tournament on September 24, 2018. He won the fight by a first-round knockout, flooring Hamidi with a left straight. Takei was then booked to face Yodbuadaeng Fairtex in another non-title bout at K-1 World GP 2018: K-1 Lightweight World's Strongest Tournament on December 8, 2018. He won the fight by decision, after an extra fourth round was contested. Takei faced Sandro Martin in yet another non-title bout at K-1 World GP 2019: K’FESTA 2 on March 10, 2019. He won the fight by a first-round technical knockout.

==== 2019 Super bantamweight World Grand Prix ====
Takei participated in the 2019 K-1 Super Bantamweight World Grand Prix on June 30, 2019. He faced Alex Rivas in the tournament quarterfinals, while the other three tournament pairings saw Masashi Kumura face Phetpangan Mor.Ratanabandit, Samvel Babayan face Koki and Shuhei Kumura face Sadegh Hashemi. Takei beat Rivas by a first-round technical knockout, after knocking Rivas down twice inside of a single round, which resulted in a stoppage victory for him under the tournament rules. Advancing to the semifinals, Takei faced Shuhei Kumura. He made quick work of Kumura as well, knocking him down twice by the 1:46 minute mark of the opening round. Takei faced the reigning Krush Super Bantamweight champion Masashi Kumura in the finals of the Grand Prix. He won the fight by a second-round knockout.

Takei fought Suriyanlek Aor.Bor.Tor. Kampee during K-1's 2019 Nagoya event. He won the fight by a unanimous decision. He fought Dansiam Ayothayafightgym during K'Festa 3. Takei won the fight by a unanimous decision.

On December 9, 2020, at the K'Festa 4 press conference Takei announced his departure from kickboxing. At the time of his retirement, he was the #1 flyweight and #8 pound for pound kickboxer in the world according to Combat Press. He had been ranked in the P4P top ten since July 2019. He's was ranked as the #1 strawweight by Combat Press from May 2019 until August 2020 and as a top ten bantamweight from April 2018 until April 2019.

== Boxing career ==
=== Early career ===
On December 12, 2020, at the K-1 World GP 2020 Winter's Crucial Bout event Takei relinquished his K-1 title and announced his transition to boxing. He accordingly joined the Ohashi gym where he would be trained by the recently retired Akira Yaegashi.

For his boxing debut, Takei was scheduled to fight Kazunori Takai on March 11, 2021. He won the fight by TKO in the first round, forcing Takai's corner to throw in the towel after the second knockdown. Takei was booked to face the up-and-coming prospect Azusa Takeda on September 9, 2021, in the Korakuen Hall. He won the fight by knockout in the first round.

Takei faced the undefeated Kazuhiro Imamura in his third professional bout, which took place on the undercard of the Naoya Inoue and Aran Dipaen bantamweight world title fight, on December 14, 2021. He won the fight by a first-round knockout. Takei was next booked to face Shingo Kawamura on April 22, 2022, at the Korakuen Hall in Tokyo, Japan. He won the fight by a second-round technical knockout. Following this fight, Takei was awarded the best newcomer award by the East Japan Boxing Association for the month of April.

=== OPBF super bantamweight champion ===
==== Takei vs. Apolinar ====
His four fight undefeated streak earned Takei the chance to face the reigning OPBF super bantamweight champion Pete Apolinar, in the latter's first title defense. The bout headlined an Abema and Hikari TV broadcast card, which took place at the Korakuen Hall on August 26, 2022. In front of an audience of 1,420 people, Takei won the fight by a fifth-round knockout. He had a great start to the fight, as he knocked Apolinar down twice in the second round, with a right hook and left hook respectively, and knocked him down once more with a leaping right hook in the fourth round as well. Takei was leading 40–33 on all three of the judges scorecards after the first four rounds were contested. The fight was stopped at the 2:07 minute mark of the fifth round, as the referee waved the bout off after Apolinar was once again staggered, judging the Filipino fighter to have sustained too much damage. This victory earned Takei the "Fighter of the Month" award for the month of August from the East Japan Boxing Association and eFight.

==== Takei vs. Tarimo ====
Takei made his first OPBF super bantamweight title defense against Bruno Tarimo on December 23, 2022, at the Ariake Arena in Tokyo, Japan. The bout took place on the undercard of the Naoya Inoue and Paul Butler undisputed bantamweight title fight, which was broadcast by PXB domestically in Japan and by ESPN in the United States. Takei beat Tarimo by doctor stoppage due to a cut in the eleventh round after scoring a knockdown in the first round. He was up 40–35 on all three of the judges' scorecards after the first four-round rounds were contested and was up 99–90, 99–90 and 100–89 at the time of the stoppage.

==== Takei vs. Baldonado ====
Takei was expected to face the Philippine national bantamweight champion Ronnie Baldonado in a non-title bout on May 7, 2023. The eight-round fight was to take place at the Yokohama Arena in Yokohama, Japan, and was supposed to be broadcast by Lemino domestically and ESPN+ in the United States. The bout was rescheduled for July 25, 2023, at the Ariake Arena in Tokyo, Japan. He won the fight by a third-round knockout. The contest took place at a 54 kilogram catchweight, as Ohashi gym chairman Hideyuki Ohashi recommended Takei drop down to bantamweight, considering his gym-mate Naoya Inoue moved up to super bantamweight, where Takei had previously campaigned. Takei vacated the OPBF super bantamweight title on November 29, 2023.

=== WBO Bantamweight Championship ===
==== Takei vs. Moloney ====
Takei challenged Jason Moloney for the WBO bantamweight title on May 6, 2024, at Tokyo Dome in Tokyo, Japan. Takei upset the odds and won by unanimous decision (116–111, 116–111, 117–110), also securing a world title in only his ninth professional fight.

==== Takei vs. Higa ====
Takei made the first defense of his WBO Bantamweight title against Daigo Higa on September 3, 2024, at Ariake Arena in Tokyo, Japan. Takei defended his title by unanimous decision.

==== Takei vs. Tongdee ====
In November 2024, it was reported that Takei would defend his WBO bantamweight title against Yuttapong Tongdee on December 24, 2025, the bout occurred as undercard of the Inoue-Goodman event, but the bout was postponed to January 24, 2025, after Sam Goodman suffered a serious cut on his eyelid during sparring. However on December 18, 2024, it was reported that Takei pulled out from the event due to a shoulder injury. The fight was reschedule at the Yokohama Cultural Gymnasium in Yokohama, Japan on May 28, 2025, and was broadcast by DAZN in the United States. He won the fight by knockout in the first round.

==== Takei vs. Medina ====
Takei defended his WBO bantamweight title against Christian Medina on September 14, 2025, at the Aichi International Arena in Nagoya, Japan. He lost the bout by TKO in the fourth round, losing the title and his first bout in the process.

== Titles and accomplishments ==
=== Kickboxing ===
==== Professional ====
- K-1
  - K-1 Super Bantamweight (55 kg) Championship (One time, former)
    - One successful title defense
  - 2017 K-1 World GP Super Bantamweight (-55 kg) World Grand Prix Winner
  - 2019 K-1 World GP Super Bantamweight (-55 kg) World Grand Prix Winner
- Krush
  - 2016 Krush Bantamweight (55 kg) Championship (Inaugural; former)
    - One successful title defense
- WINDY Super Fight
  - 2015 WINDY KICK Super Flyweight Championship

==== Amateur ====
- Martial Arts Japan Kickboxing Federation
  - 2011 MA Jr. -45 kg Champion
- WINDY Super Fight
  - 2011 WINDY Super Fight -45 kg Champion
  - 2010 WINDY Super Fight -40 kg Champion

=== Awards ===
- K-1 Awards
  - 2017 K-1 Fighter of the Year
  - 2018 K-1 Knockout of the Year (vs Akram Hamidi)
- eFight.com
  - Fighter of the Month (April 2017, June 2019, August 2022 and May 2024)

=== Boxing ===
- World Boxing Organization
  - World Boxing Organization World Bantamweight Champion (2024)

== Professional boxing record ==
13 fights	12 wins	1 loss
By knockout	9	1
By decision	3	0

No.	Result	Record	Opponent	Type	Round, time	Date	Location	Notes
13	Win	12–1	Wang Dekang	UD	8	May 2, 2026	Tokyo Dome, Tokyo, Japan	
12	Loss	11–1	Christian Medina	TKO	4 (12), 1:21	Sep 14, 2025	IG Arena, Nagoya, Japan	Lost WBO bantamweight title
11	Win	11–0	Yuttapong Tongdee	TKO	1 (12), 2:07	May 28, 2025	Yokohama Cultural Gymnasium, Yokohama, Japan	Retained WBO bantamweight title
10	Win	10–0	Daigo Higa	UD	12	Sep 3, 2024	Ariake Arena, Tokyo, Japan	Retained WBO bantamweight title
9	Win	9–0	Jason Moloney	UD	12	May 6, 2024	Tokyo Dome, Tokyo, Japan	Won WBO bantamweight title
8	Win	8–0	Mario Alberto Diaz	KO	2 (8), 2:23	Dec 26, 2023	Ariake Arena, Tokyo, Japan	
7	Win	7–0	Ronnie Baldonado	KO	3 (8), 1:08	Jul 25, 2023	Ariake Arena, Tokyo, Japan	
6	Win	6–0	Bruno Tarimo	TKO	11 (12), 2:17	Dec 13, 2022	Ariake Arena, Tokyo, Japan	Retained OPBF super bantamweight title
5	Win	5–0	Pete Apolinar	TKO	5 (12), 2:07	Aug 26, 2022	Korakuen Hall, Tokyo, Japan	Won OPBF super bantamweight title
4	Win	4–0	Shingo Kawamura	TKO	2 (10), 1:22	Apr 22, 2022	Korakuen Hall, Tokyo, Japan	
3	Win	3–0	Kazuhiro Imamura	TKO	1 (8), 0:59	Dec 14, 2021	Ryōgoku Kokugikan, Tokyo, Japan	
2	Win	2–0	Azusa Takeda	TKO	1 (6), 2:57	Sep 9, 2021	Korakuen Hall, Tokyo, Japan	
1	Win	1–0	Kazunori Takai	TKO	1 (6), 1:43	Mar 11, 2021	Korakuen Hall, Tokyo, Japan	

== Kickboxing record ==
Kickboxing record
23 Wins (16 (T)KO's), 2 Losses, 0 Draw, 0 No Contest
Date	Result	Opponent	Event	Location	Method	Round	Time
2020-03-22	Win	(Thailand) Dansiam Ayothayafightgym	K-1: K’Festa 3	Saitama, Japan	Decision (Unanimous)	3	3:00
2019-12-28	Win	(Thailand) Suriyanlek Aor.Bor.Tor.Kampee	K-1 World GP 2019 Japan: ～Women's Flyweight Championship Tournament～	Nagoya, Japan	Decision (Unanimous)	3	3:00
2019-06-30	Win	(Japan) Masashi Kumura	K-1 World GP 2019: Super Bantamweight World Tournament, Final	Saitama, Japan	KO (Right hook + head kick)	2	0:38
Wins the K-1 World GP 2019 -55kg Tournament.
2019-06-30	Win	(Japan) Shuhei Kumura	K-1 World GP 2019: Super Bantamweight World Tournament, Semi Finals	Saitama, Japan	TKO (2 knockdowns rule)	1	1:46
2019-06-30	Win	(Spain) Alex Rivas	K-1 World GP 2019: Super Bantamweight World Tournament, Quarter Finals	Saitama, Japan	TKO (2 Knockdowns rule)	1	2:46
2019-03-10	Win	(Spain) Sandro Martin	K-1 World GP 2019: K’FESTA 2	Saitama, Japan	TKO (Referee Stoppage)	1	2:53
2018-12-08	Win	(Thailand) Yodbuadaeng Fairtex	K-1 World GP 2018: K-1 Lightweight World's Strongest Tournament	Osaka, Japan	Ext.R Decision (Unanimous)	4	3:00
2018-09-24	Win	(France) Akram Hamidi	K-1 World GP 2018: inaugural Cruiserweight Championship Tournament	Saitama, Japan	KO (Punches)	1	1:41
2018-03-21	Win	(Japan) Kenji Kubo	K-1 World GP 2018: K'FESTA.1	Saitama, Japan	KO (Right Hook)	1	1:27
Defended the K-1 Super Bantamweight Championship.
2017-11-23	Win	(United States) Victor Saravia	K-1 World GP 2017 Japan Heavyweight Championship Tournament	Saitama, Japan	KO (Punches to the Body)	1	1:38
2017-09-18	Win	(Japan) Namito Izawa	K-1 World GP 2017 Welterweight Championship Tournament	Saitama, Japan	KO (3 Knockdowns)	3	1:10
2017-04-22	Win	(Japan) Kenji Kubo	K-1 World GP 2017: Super Bantamweight Tournament, Final	Tokyo, Japan	Decision (Unanimous)	3	3:00
Wins the K-1 World GP 2017 -55kg World Tournament.
2017-04-22	Win	(Japan) Keisuke Ishida	K-1 World GP 2017: Super Bantamweight Tournament, Semifinals	Tokyo, Japan	TKO (Right Hooks)	1	1:30
2017-04-22	Win	(Spain) Antonio Orden	K-1 World GP 2017: Super Bantamweight Tournament, QuarterFinals	Tokyo, Japan	TKO (Referee Stoppage)	3	2:31
2016-12-18	Win	(Japan) Ryusei	Krush.71	Tokyo, Japan	TKO (3 Knockdowns)	3	2:45
Defended the Krush Bantamweight Title.
2016-10-10	Win	(Japan) Yuichiro Ito	GRACHAN 25 x BFC Vol. 2	Tokyo, Japan	Decision (Unanimous)	3	3:00
2016-06-12	Win	(Japan) Yuki Ueba	Krush.66 –53 kg Tournament Final	Tokyo, Japan	KO (Right Uppercut)	1	1:43
Wins the Krush Bantamweight Title.
2016-04-10	Win	(Japan) Ryusei	Krush.65 –53 kg Tournament Semi Finals	Tokyo, Japan	KO (Left uppercut)	2	2:15
2016-02-05	Win	(Japan) Taito Gunji	Krush.63	Tokyo, Japan	Decision (Unanimous)	3	3:00
2015-12-04	Win	(Japan) Katsuhiro	Krush.61	Tokyo, Japan	KO (Punch to the Body)	1	0:51
2015-10-04	Win	(Japan) Yusho Kamemoto	Krush.59	Tokyo, Japan	Decision (Unanimous)	3	3:00
2015-08-16	Win	(Japan) Shuto Hagiwara	WINDY Super Fight 2015	Tokyo, Japan	TKO (Three knockdowns)	1	1:52
Wins the WINDY KICK Super Flyweight Title.
2015-04-19	Loss	(Japan) Haruma Saikyo	K-1 World GP 2015 -55kg Championship Tournament	Tokyo, Japan	Decision (Majority)	3	3:00
2015-01-04	Loss	(Japan) Tenma Sano	Krush.49	Tokyo, Japan	Decision (Majority)	3	3:00
2014-11-09	Win	(Japan) Tasuku	Krush.47	Tokyo, Japan	KO (Body punches)	1	2:33
Legend: Win Loss Draw/No contest Notes

=== Amateur record ===
Amateur Kickboxing Record
Date	Result	Opponent	Event	Location	Method	Round	Time
2012-02-25	Draw	(Japan) Tenshin Nasukawa	Bigbang 8	Tokyo, Japan	Decision	3	2:00
2011-12-04	Win	(Japan) Kaede Honami	4th Kokusai Junior Kickboxing	Japan			
2011-11-19	Win	(Japan) Hiroto Ishizuka	TRIBELATE vol.35 -Title Match Festival-	Tokyo, Japan	KO	1	1:18
2011-07-31	Loss	(Japan) Kaito Fukuda	Muay Thai WINDY Super Fight vol.8	Japan	Ext.R Decision (Unanimous)	3	1:00
For the Muay Thai Windy Super Fight −45kg title.
2011-07-03	Loss	(Japan) Riku Anpo	Muay Thai WINDY Super Fight in NAGOYA ～Muay Typhoon!～	Nagoya, Japan	Decision (Unanimous)	2	1:30
2011-07-03	Loss	(Japan) Shodai Matsuoka	Muay Thai WINDY Super Fight in NAGOYA ～Muay Typhoon!～	Nagoya, Japan	Decision (Unanimous)	2	1:30
2011-06-19	Loss	(Japan) Sho Yamaura	Muay Thai WINDY Super Fight vol.7	Tokyo, Japan	Decision (Unanimous)	2	3:00
2011-04-29	Win	(Japan) Yuzuki Sakai	Muay Thai WINDY Super Fight vol.6, Final	Tokyo, Japan	Decision (Unanimous)	2	1:30
Wins Windy Super Fight -45kg Title.
2011-04-29	Win	(Japan) Kaito Fukuda	Muay Thai WINDY Super Fight vol.6, Semi Final	Japan	Ext.R Decision		
2011-04-24	Loss	(Japan) Sho Yamaura	MA BREAK-12 -It starts-	Tokyo, Japan	Decision (Majority)	3	1:30
For the MA Kick Jr -47kg Title.
2011-04-17	Win	(Japan) Yugo Tsuboi	JAKF Amateur	Tokyo, Japan	Decision (Unanimous)	2	1:30
2010-09-19	Loss	(Japan) Kaito Fukuda	Muay Thai WINDY Super Fight 4	Tokyo, Japan	Decision	2	2:00
Loses Muay Thai Windy Super Fight −40kg title.
2010-07-11	Loss	(Japan) Tenshin Nasukawa	M-1 Muay Thai Amateur 35, Semi Final	Tokyo, Japan	Decision		
2010-06-13	Win	(Japan)	Muay Thai WINDY Super Fight vol.3	Tokyo, Japan			
Wins Muay Thai Windy Super Fight −40kg title.
2010-04-25	Win	(Japan) Yoshihisa Yano		Saitama Prefecture, Japan			
2009-09-27	Win	(Japan) Haruma Saikyo		Saitama Prefecture, Japan			
2009-04-19	Loss	(Japan) Yuichi Hatada		Saitama Prefecture, Japan			
Legend: Win Loss Draw/No contest Notes

== See also ==
- List of male kickboxers
- List of K-1 champions
- List of southpaw stance boxers
- Boxing in Japan
- List of Japanese boxing world champions
- List of world bantamweight boxing champions

Sporting positions
Regional boxing titles
Preceded by Pete Apolinar	OBPF super-bantamweight champion August 26, 2022 – 2023; Vacated	Vacant Title next held by Kazuki Nakajima
World boxing titles
Preceded by Jason Moloney	WBO bantamweight champion May 6, 2024 – September 14, 2025	Succeeded by Christian Medina
