= Naoya Inoue vs. Junto Nakatani =

Boxing competition

The Day
- Date: May 2, 2026
- Venue: Tokyo Dome, Tokyo, Japan
- Title(s) on the line: WBA (Super), WBC, IBF, WBO, The Ring Super Bantamweight Champion

Tale of the tape
Boxer	Naoya Inoue	Junto Nakatani
Nickname	The Monster	Big Bang
Hometown	Zama, Kanagawa, Japan	Inabe, Mie, Japan
Pre-fight record	32–0 (27 KO)	32–0 (24 KO)
Age	33 years	28 years, 4 months
Height	5 ft 5 in (165 cm)	5 ft 8 in (173 cm)
Weight	121.9 lb (55 kg)	121.5 lb (55 kg)
Style	Orthodox	Southpaw
Recognition	WBA (Super), WBC, IBF; WBO, The Ring and TBRB; Undisputed Super Bantamweight Champion; The Ring No. 2 ranked pound-for-pound fighter TBRB No.1 ranked pound-for-pound fighter 4-division world champion	WBC, IBF, The Ring; Bantamweight Champion; The Ring; No. 4 Ranked Super; Bantamweight; The Ring/TBRB No. 6 ranked pound-for-pound fighter 3-division world champion

Result
- Inoue wins by Unanimous Decision (116–112, 116–112, 115–113)

Naoya Inoue vs. Junto Nakatani, billed as The Day, was a super bantamweight undisputed championship professional boxing match contested between the reigning WBA (Super), WBC, IBF, WBO, and The Ring super bantamweight champion, Naoya Inoue, and undefeated former three-weight world champion Junto Nakatani. Inoue defeated Nakatani by UD to retain his undisputed super bantamweight titles. The bout took place on May 2, 2026 at the Tokyo Dome in Tokyo, Japan.

== Background ==
Following Naoya Inoue's victory over Ramon Cardenas on 4 May 2025, discussions surrounding a potential fight with Junto Nakatani intensified. The two fighters had previously crossed paths at the Japanese Boxing Awards on 31 March 2025, where Inoue challenged Nakatani to a bout at the Tokyo Dome in 2026. Nakatani accepted the challenge, responding, "Let's do it."

On 6 March 2026, it was officially announced that Inoue would defend his undisputed super bantamweight championship against undefeated Japanese challenger Junto Nakatani on 2 May 2026. The fight was confirmed as one of the most anticipated all-Japanese boxing matchups, with Nakatani moving up to the super bantamweight division in pursuit of a fourth world title. Both fighters entered the bout undefeated with identical records of 32–0, making the contest a major event in Japanese boxing history.

== Reception ==
The fight reportedly sold over 1 million PPV buys on Lemino. It also generated $32 million from ticket sales. The fight took place in front of a sell-out crowd of 55,000 fans, with additional money earned from merchandising, sponsorships, and advertising. The gate was ranked the 4th highest in boxing history.

== Fight card ==
Weight class		vs.		Method	Round	Time	Notes
Main card
Super bantamweight	Naoya Inoue (c)	def.	Junto Nakatani	UD	12	3:00	^{Note 1}
Bantamweight	Takuma Inoue (c)	def.	Kazuto Ioka	UD	12	3:00	^{Note 2}
Featherweight	Toshiki Shimomachi	def.	Reiya Abe	MD	10	3:00
Welterweight	Jin Sasaki	def.	Sora Tanaka	SD	10	3:00	^{Note 3}
Flyweight	Kosuke Tomioka	draw	Shogo Tanaka	SD	10	3:00
Super middleweight	Yuito Moriwaki	def.	Deok No Yun	SD	10	3:00
Super bantamweight	Yoshiki Takei	def.	DeKang Wang	MD	8	3:00

^Note 1 For the undisputed super bantamweight championship, including the WBA (Super), WBC, IBF, WBO, and The Ring titles
^Note 2 For the WBC bantamweight title
^Note 3 For the OPBF welterweight title

== Broadcasting ==
Country/Region	Free-to-air	Cable/Satellite	PPV	Stream
Japan (host)	—N/a		Lemino	—N/a
United States	—N/a			DAZN
United Kingdom	—N/a			DAZN
Australia	—N/a		Kayo	—N/a
