= Yuttapong Tongdee =

Thai boxer and Muay Thai fighter

- Born: Yuttapong Tongdee; 18 August 1993 (age 33); Chum Phae district, Khon Kaen province, Thailand
- Native name: ยุทธพงศ์ ทองดี
- Other names: Dang Sor.Ploenchit; Dang Lukjaoporongtom
- Height: 5 ft 3 in (160 cm)
- Division: Mini Flyweight; Light Flyweight; Flyweight; Super Flyweight; Bantamweight
- Reach: 63 in (160 cm)
- Style: Muay Thai; Boxing
- Stance: Orthodox
- Fighting out of: Nakhon Sawan, Thailand

Professional boxing record
- Total: 17
- Wins: 15
- By knockout: 9
- Losses: 2
- By knockout: 2

Other information
- Boxing record from BoxRec

Yuttapong Tongdee
Medal record

Representing Thailand

Men's amateur boxing

Asian Games
Bronze medal – third place	2018 Jakarta-Palembang	Flyweight

Yuttapong Tongdee (Thai: ยุทธพงศ์ ทองดี; born 18 August 1993), known professionally in Muay Thai as Dang Sor.Ploenchit (Thai: ดัง ส.เพลินจิต) or Dang Lukjaoporongtom (Thai: ดัง ลูกเจ้าพ่อโรงต้ม) is a Thai professional Muay Thai fighter and boxer. He is a former Rajadamnern Stadium Light-flyweight champion and WBO bantamweight world title challenger.

== Muay Thai career ==
On February 21, 2013, Dang faced Prajanchai Por.Petchnamthong for the Onesongchai promotion at the Rajadamnern Stadium. He lost the fight by decision.

Dang participated to a Songkran festivity Muay Thai card on April 14, 2011, against Tuan Kor.Kampanat. He won the fight by decision.

Dang reached the peak of his stadium career on June 2, 2011, whe he faced Prakaithong Sitnoi for the vacant Rajadamnern Stadium Light Flyweight (108 lbs) title. He won the fight by decision.

== Boxing career ==
=== Amateur ===
Yuttapong started to compete in amateur boxing in 2014. He won the 2016 FISU World University Championships and the 2018 Thailand Open Tournament. His most prestigious amateur accomplishment was the bronze medal he earned in the 2018 Asian Games. The most notable name he defeated during his amateur career is two time olympic gold medalist Robeisy Ramirez who he beat at the 2017 Giraldo Cordova Cardin Tournament in Cuba. He turned professional in 2020.

=== Professional boxing career ===
On August 6, 2022, Tongdee faced Ryan Rey Ponteras for the vacant WBA Asia Bantamweight title. He won the fight by unanimous decision.

Tongdee made the first defense of his WBA Asia title on October 1, 2022, against Herlan Gomez. He won by technical knockout in the eight round.

On May 6, 2023, Tongdee defeated Zhengwei Xie by technical knockout in the second round.

Tongdee made the second defense of his WBA Asia title on February 4, 2023, against F.Zoramchhana who he defeated by unanimous decision.

Tongdee made the third defense of his WBA Asia title against Giuliano Fantone on June 1, 2024. He won the fight by unanimous decision.

In November 2024, it was reported that Tongdee would challenge his WBO bantamweight title against Yoshiki Takei on December 24, 2025, the bout occurred as undercard of the Inoue-Goodman event, but was postponed to January 24, 2025, after Sam Goodman suffered a serious cut on his eyelid during sparring. However on December 18, 2024, it was reported that Takei pulled out from the event due to a shoulder injury. The fight will be reschedule at the Yokohama Cultural Gymnasium in Yokohama, Japan on May 28, 2025, as co-main event of the Rikiishi-Nuñez event and will be broadcast by DAZN in United States. 47 seconds into the fight, Tongdee was knocked down by the champion's left hook, he was eventually knocked down three more times before the referee stopped the fight two minutes and seven seconds into the first round.

== Titles and accomplishments ==
=== Muay Thai ===
- Rajadamnern Stadium
  - 2011 Rajadamnern Stadium Light Flyweight (108 lbs) Champion

== Professional boxing record ==
17 fights	15 wins	2 losses
By knockout	9	2
By decision	6	0

No.	Result	Record	Opponent	Type	Round, time	Date	Location	Notes
17	Loss	15–2	Kim Ye-joon	KO	4 (10), 1:02	Nov 28, 2025	MISA Cannt Lahore, Lahore, Pakistan	For inaugural WBA Asia Gold super bantamweight title
16	Loss	15–1	Yoshiki Takei	TKO	1 (12), 2:07	May 28, 2025	Yokohama Cultural Gymnasium, Yokohama, Japan	For WBO bantamweight title
15	Win	15–0	Giuliano Fantone	UD	10	Jun 1, 2024	Spaceplus Bangkok RCA, Bangkok, Thailand	Retained WBA Asia bantamweight title
14	Win	14–0	Thanachai Khamoon	TKO	3 (10), 0:46	Mar 2, 2024	Spaceplus Bangkok RCA, Bangkok, Thailand	
13	Win	13–0	Tanawat Phonnaku	TKO	3 (8), 2:15	Jan 29, 2024	Akethawee Muaythai Gym, Nakhon Pathom, Thailand	
12	Win	12–0	Nima Jahanshahiafshar	TKO	2 (6), 1:49	Jul 1, 2023	Spaceplus Bangkok RCA, Bangkok, Thailand	
11	Win	11–0	Zhengwei Xie	TKO	2 (6), 0:53	May 6, 2023	Spaceplus Bangkok RCA, Bangkok, Thailand	
10	Win	10–0	F. Zoramchhana	UD	10	Feb 4, 2023	Spaceplus Bangkok RCA, Bangkok, Thailand	Retained WBA Asia bantamweight title
9	Win	9–0	Herlan Gomez	TKO	8 (10), 2:38	Oct 1, 2022	Spaceplus Bangkok RCA, Bangkok, Thailand	Retained WBA Asia bantamweight title
8	Win	8–0	Ryan Rey Ponteras	UD	10	Aug 6, 2022	Spaceplus Bangkok RCA, Bangkok, Thailand	Won WBA Asia bantamweight title
7	Win	7–0	Lerdchai Chaiyawed	UD	6	May 7, 2022	Suamlum Night Bazaar, Bangkok, Thailand	
6	Win	6–0	Yutthana Takhianram	UD	8	Feb 27, 2021	Suamlum Night Bazaar, Bangkok, Thailand	
5	Win	5–0	Wicha Phulaikhao	TKO	5 (6)	Dec 19, 2020	Suamlum Night Bazaar, Bangkok, Thailand	
4	Win	4–0	Kan Hamongkol	TKO	4 (6)	Oct 31, 2020	Suamlum Night Bazaar, Bangkok, Thailand	
3	Win	3–0	Tongthep Taeyawong	TKO	2 (6)	Sep 26, 2020	Suamlum Night Bazaar, Bangkok, Thailand	
2	Win	2–0	Jirawat Thammachot	UD	6	Aug 29, 2020	Suamlum Night Bazaar, Bangkok, Thailand	
1	Win	1–0	Artid Bamrungauea	TKO	4 (6)	Jul 11, 2020	Suamlum Night Bazaar, Bangkok, Thailand	

== Muay Thai record ==
Muay Thai Record
Date	Result	Opponent	Event	Location	Method	Round	Time
2014-02-23	Win	(Thailand) Ponkrit Sor.Jor.Wichitmuangpaetriew	Channel 7 Stadium	Bangkok, Thailand	Decision	5	3:00
2014-01-28	Win	(Thailand) Visanlek Seatrandiscovery	Phumphanmuang, Lumpinee Stadium	Bangkok, Thailand	Decision	5	3:00
2013-11-10	Win	(Thailand) Sorntong Sor.Yingcharoenkarnchang	Channel 7 Stadium	Bangkok, Thailand	Decision	5	3:00
2013-10-15	Win	(Thailand) Jaokhunthong Thesabalnonmuang		Chaiyaphum province, Thailand	KO	4	
2013-08-01	Loss	(Thailand) Kwanpetch Sor.Suwannaphakdee	Bangrachan, Rajadamnern Stadium	Bangkok, Thailand	Decision	5	3:00
2013-06-20	Win	(Thailand) Thanusuklek Aor.Kwanmuang		Yasothon province, Thailand	KO	1	
2013-03-27	Loss	(Thailand) Kwanpetch Sor.Suwannaphakdee	Bangrachan, Rajadamnern Stadium	Bangkok, Thailand	Decision	5	3:00
2013-02-21	Loss	(Thailand) Prajanchai Por.Petchnamthong	Onesongchai, Rajadamnern Stadium	Bangkok, Thailand	Decision	5	3:00
2013-01-18	Loss	(Thailand) Inseekhao Rachanon	Khunsuk Trakunyang, Lumpinee Stadium	Bangkok, Thailand	Decision	5	3:00
2012-09-17	Loss	(Thailand) Densayam Ekbangsai	Onesongchai, Rajadamnern Stadium	Bangkok, Thailand	Decision	5	3:00
2012-05-17	Win	(Thailand) PhetUtong Or.Kwanmuang	Sor.Sommai, Rajadamnern Stadium	Bangkok, Thailand	Decision	5	3:00
2012-03-29	Win	(Thailand) Petchinnarat Sor.Sommai	Sor.Sommai, Rajadamnern Stadium	Bangkok, Thailand	Decision	5	3:00
2012-02-17	Loss	(Thailand) Lomtalay SitsoUeng	Por.Pramuk, Lumpinee Stadium	Bangkok, Thailand	Decision	5	3:00
2011-12-12	Loss	(Thailand) Saengdawlek Sor.Kittichai	Onesongchai, Rajadamnern Stadium	Bangkok, Thailand	Decision	5	3:00
2011-11-08	Win	(Thailand) PhetUtong Or.Kwanmuang	Khunsuk Trakunyang, Lumpinee Stadium	Bangkok, Thailand	Decision	5	3:00
2011-09-19	Loss	(Thailand) Saenkeng NuiKafaeBoran	Kiatyongyut, Rajadamnern Stadium	Bangkok, Thailand	Decision	5	3:00
2011-07-21	Loss	(Thailand) Detkard Por.Pongsawang	Onesongchai, Rajadamnern Stadium	Bangkok, Thailand	Decision	5	3:00
Loses the Rajadamnern Stadium Light Flyweight (108 lbs) title.
2011-06-02	Win	(Thailand) Prakaithong Sitnoi	Onesongchai, Rajadamnern Stadium	Bangkok, Thailand	Decision	5	3:00
Won the vacant Rajadamnern Stadium Light Flyweight (108 lbs) title.
2011-04-14	Win	(Thailand) Tuan Kor.Kampanat	Onesongchai, Rajadamnern Stadium	Bangkok, Thailand	Decision	5	3:00
2011-03-03	Loss	(Thailand) Saengdawlek Sor.Kittichai	Onesongchai, Rajadamnern Stadium	Bangkok, Thailand	Decision	5	3:00
2011-01-20	Win	(Thailand) Yodthongchai Tor.Mahahin	Onesongchai, Rajadamnern Stadium	Bangkok, Thailand	Decision	5	3:00
2010-12-02	Win	(Thailand) Daolukkai Meedeekarnyang2Thapchang	Onesongchai, Rajadamnern Stadium	Bangkok, Thailand	Decision	5	3:00
2010-10-25	Loss	(Thailand) TeeUS Kor.Ratchada	Phettongkam, Lumpinee Stadium	Bangkok, Thailand	Decision	5	3:00
2010-07-15	Loss	(Thailand) Daolukkai Meedeekarnyang2Thapchang	Onesongchai, Rajadamnern Stadium	Bangkok, Thailand	Decision	5	3:00
2010-06-11	Win	(Thailand) Kant Naplatrahoimuk	Por.Pramuk, Lumpinee Stadium	Bangkok, Thailand	Decision	5	3:00
2010-05-13	Loss	(Thailand) Petpanomrung Sor.Thamarangsri	Onesongchai, Rajadamnern Stadium	Bangkok, Thailand	Decision	5	3:00
2010-03-12	Win	(Thailand) Phayanon Sor.Thammarangsri	Petchyindee, Lumpinee Stadium	Bangkok, Thailand	Decision	5	3:00
2010-01-14	Loss	(Thailand) Numthesaban Sit Sor.Tor.Thetsak	Onesongchai, Rajadamnern Stadium	Bangkok, Thailand	Decision	5	3:00
2009-11-07	Win	(Thailand) Numthesaban Sit Sor.Tor.Thetsak	Omnoi Stadium	Samut Sakhon, Thailand	Decision	5	3:00
2009-10-14	Loss	(Thailand) Superbank Sakchaichot	Rajadamnern Stadium	Bangkok, Thailand	Decision	5	3:00
2009-08-27	Win	(Thailand) Numthesaban Sit Sor.Tor.Thetsak	Onesongchai, Rajadamnern Stadium	Bangkok, Thailand	Decision	5	3:00
2009-08-06	Win	(Thailand) Superbank Sakchaichot	Rajadamnern Stadium	Bangkok, Thailand	Decision	5	3:00
2009-06-18	Win	(Thailand) Fahmongkol Bangjaroensuk	Onesongchai, Rajadamnern Stadium	Bangkok, Thailand	Decision	5	3:00
2009-05-07	Win	(Thailand) Kant Namplatrahoimuk	Onesongchai, Rajadamnern Stadium	Bangkok, Thailand	Decision	5	3:00
2009-02-26	Win	(Thailand) Fahmongkol Bangjaroensuk	Onesongchai, Rajadamnern Stadium	Bangkok, Thailand	Decision	5	3:00
2009-01-08	Loss	(Thailand) Fahmongkol Bangjaroensuk	Onesongchai, Rajadamnern Stadium	Bangkok, Thailand	Decision	5	3:00
2008-10-09	Win	(Thailand) Saengdawlek Sor.Kittichai	Onesongchai, Rajadamnern Stadium	Bangkok, Thailand	Decision	5	3:00
2008-09-18	Win	(Thailand) Saengthiannoi Sor.Somphong	Onesongchai, Rajadamnern Stadium	Bangkok, Thailand	Decision	5	3:00
Legend: Win Loss Draw/No contest Notes
