= Kim Ye-joon =

South Korean boxer (born 1992)

Personal information
- Nickname: Troublemaker
- Nationality: South Korean
- Born: October 10, 1992 (age 33) Seoul, South Korea
- Height: 5 ft 5 in (165 cm)
- Weight: Super bantamweight; Featherweight

Boxing career
- Reach: 67 1/2 in (171 cm)
- Stance: Southpaw

Boxing record
- Total fights: 27
- Wins: 22
- Win by KO: 14
- Losses: 3
- Draws: 2

Kim Ye-joon (Korean: 김예준; Hanja: 金藝俊, born October 10, 1992) is a South Korean professional boxer, who challenged for the undisputed super bantamweight title in 2025.

== Early life ==
Born on October 10, 1992, Kim was an orphan left in a facility at age five, facing relentless bullying due to his circumstances, leading to feelings of being an outcast, which drove him to boxing as an escape and path to identity. He never knew his parents and wasn't adopted, but boxing gave him discipline and a chance to overcome his past struggles. He discovered boxing as a way to cope with bullying, finding strength and a new sense of self, eventually dropping out of university to pursue it professionally.

== Amateur career ==
Kim had no amateur career.

== Professional career ==
=== Debut ===
At the age of 19 years old on February 28, 2012, Kim made his professional boxing debut against Pil Joon Kim, winning the fight via 4 round split decision.

=== Undisputed Super bantamweight title fight ===
On January 10, 2025, it was reported that on January 24, 2025, Kim would fight for the undisputed super bantamweight title against champion Naoya Inoue as replacement for injured Sam Goodman, whom the latter pulled out due to an eye injury. Kim lost the fight by 4th round knockout. This was the first and only knockout loss of Kim's career

=== Kim vs Tongdee ===
On November 11, 2025, Kim returned to the ring against former WBO bantamweight title challenger Yuttapong Tongdee. Kim won the fight by 4th round knockout.

== Professional boxing record ==
27 fights	22 wins	3 losses
By knockout	14	1
By decision	8	2
Draws	2	

No.	Result	Record	Opponent	Type	Round, time	Date	Location	Notes
27	Win	22–3–2	Yuttapong Tongdee	KO	4 (10), 1:02	Nov 28, 2025	MISA Cannt Lahore, Lahore, Pakistan	Won inaugural WBA Asia Gold super bantamweight title
26	Loss	21–3–2	Naoya Inoue	KO	4 (12), 2:25	Jan 24, 2025	Ariake Arena, Tokyo, Japan	For WBA (Super), WBC, IBF, WBO and The Ring super bantamweight titles
25	Win	21–2–2	Rakesh Lohchab	TKO	5 (10), 3:00	May 9, 2024	World Siam Stadium, Bangkok, Thailand	Won vacant WBO Oriental super bantamweight title
24	Win	20–2–2	John Basan	TKO	1 (8), 1:22	July 7, 2023	Town Hall, Melbourne, Australia	
23	Loss	19–2–2	Rob Diezel	MD	8	Apr 15, 2023	Green River Center, Auburn, Washington, U.S.	
22	Win	19–1–2	Ruben Montoya Ramirez	TKO	4 (8)	Oct 29, 2022	Puerto Vallarta, Jalisco, Mexico	
21	Win	18–1–2	Ryo Kosaka	RTD	9 (12), 3:00	May 6, 2019	Yedang Lake Culture Square, Yesan, South Korea	
20	Win	17–1–2	Anocha Phuangkaew	KO	4 (8)	Mar 3, 2019	Seocho Gymnasium, Seoul, South Korea	
19	Win	16–1–2	Waldo Sabu	KO	2 (10), 2:54	Nov 17, 2018	Hadong Gymnasium, Hadong, South Korea	
18	Win	15–1–2	Yuki Strong Kobayashi	UD	12	Nov 6, 2016	Garden 5, Seoul, South Korea	Retained IBF Asia super bantamweight title
17	Win	14–1–2	Aekkawee Kaewmanee	UD	10	Mar 27, 2016	Yongsan Culture Center, Seoul, South Korea	
16	Win	13–1–2	Angky Angkotta	KO	6 (12), 2:42	Dec 12, 2015	Yesan Girls High School, Yesan, South Korea	Retained IBF Asia super bantamweight title
15	Win	12–1–2	Yoshihiro Utsumi	RTD	7 (12), 3:00	Jul 20, 2015	Lotte Hotel, Ulsan, South Korea	Retained IBF Asia super bantamweight title
14	Win	11–1–2	Virgil Puton	SD	12	Mar 29, 2015	Lotte Hotel, Ulsan, South Korea	Won vacant IBF Asia super bantamweight title
13	Win	10–1–2	Yoshiyuki Takabayashi	TKO	7 (8) 2:34	Nov 9, 2014	Junggu Hall, Seoul, South Korea	
12	Win	9–1–2	Chaloemchai Khrithammarat	KO	4 (10) 2:19	Aug 30, 2014	Yesan Girls High School, Yesan, South Korea	
11	Win	8–1–2	Akihiro Matsumoto	TKO	9 (10), 1:14	Mar 13, 2014	Sangyo Hall, Kanazawa, Japan	Won vacant WBC Youth super bantamweight title
10	Win	7–1–2	Jong Min Jung	TKO	8 (10), 1:37	Feb 9, 2014	Hoban Gymnasium, Chuncheon, South Korea	
9	Win	6–1–2	Sa Myung Noh	UD	8	Dec 8, 2013	Seongju Gymnasium, Seongju, South Korea	
8	Win	5–1–2	Hyun Je Shin	UD	6	Oct 20, 2013	Puno Boxing Gymnasium, Gimpo, South Korea	
7	Draw	4–1–2	Jin Wook Lim	SD	6	Jul 20, 2013	Yesan Highschool, Yesan, South Korea	
6	Win	4–1–1	Masatoshi Tomita	MD	4	Apr 21, 2013	Korakuen Hall, Tokyo, Japan	
5	Draw	3–1–1	Dong Kwan Lee	MD	4	Nov 26, 2012	Olympic Hall, Ansan, South Korea	
4	Win	3–1	Takafumi Miura	TKO	2 (4), 0:57	Jul 14, 2012	Chungnam Marine High School, Boryeong, South Korea	
3	Win	2–1	Jae Hwan In	UD	4	Apr 29, 2012	Chungeui Temple, Yesan, South Korea	
2	Loss	1–1	Sa Myung Noh	UD	4	Mar 8, 2012	Culture Center, Wanju, South Korea	
1	Win	1–0	Pil Joon Kim	SD	4	Feb 29, 2012	Culture Center, Wanju, South Korea	
