= Chainoi Worawut =

Thai boxer

Chainoi Worawut ชายน้อย วรวุฒิ
Personal information
- Nickname: Rock Man
- Nationality: Thai
- Born: Thattana Luangphon; 24 June 1997 (age 29) Bangkok, Thailand
- Height: 5 ft 5 in (165 cm)
- Weight: Super bantamweight

Boxing career
- Stance: Orthodox

Boxing record
- Total fights: 29
- Wins: 26
- Win by KO: 15
- Losses: 2
- Draws: 1
Medal record
Men's Muay Thai
Representing Thailand
Southeast Asian Games
Silver medal – second place	2017 Kuala Lumpur	Men's 57 kg

Chainoi Worawut (born 24 June 1997) is a Thai professional boxer.

== Early life ==
Worawut was born into a boxing family, his father Chatchainoi Chaoraioi was a famous Muay Thai kickboxer in the 1980s and 1990s. His uncle Takrawlek Dejrath was also a former Muay Thai kickboxer and was a contemporary 108 lbs professional boxing contender.

Before turning professional he had about 250 Muay Thai fights.

== Professional boxing career ==
Worawut made his professional debut against Hui Lu on 19 May 2018. He won the fight by a second-round knockout. Worawut amassed an 8–0 record during the next 17 months, winning all both one of those fights by way of stoppage. Worawut won the vacant WBC Youth super bantamweight title during this run, with a second-round technical knockout of the undefeated Muhammad Ashiq on 20 April 2019.

Worawut was scheduled to face Alvin Medura for the vacant WBC-ABC super bantamweight title on 19 October 2019, at the Workpoint Studio in Bang Phun. He won the fight by a sixth-round technical knockout, flooring Medura at the 1:35 minute mark. Worawut made his first title defense against Daichi Matsuura on 21 December 2019. He won the first twelve-round bout of his career by unanimous decision. Worawut next faced Artid Bamrungauea in a non-title bout on 7 March 2020. He won the fight by a third-round technical knockout. Worawut fought in yet another non-title bout on 1 August 2020, against Jomar Fajardo. He won the fight by a quick second-round knockout.

Worawut was booked to make his second WBC-ABC super bantamweight title defense against the journeyman Joel Kwong on 5 September 2020, at the Workpoint Studio in Bang Phun. He won the fight by a fourth-round technical knockout. Worawut staggered Kwong down with a flurry of punches near the end of the round, which forced the Filipino boxer the take a knee. Kwong was unsteady on his feet after beating the ten count, which prompted his cornermen to throw in the towel. Three months later, on 5 December 2020, Worawut faced Anurak Madua in a non-title bout. He won the fight by a fast second-round technical knockout.

Worawut made his third WBC-ABC super bantamweight title defense against the former two-time WBO bantamweight champion Panya Uthok on 13 March 2021, at the Workpoint Studio in Bang Phun. He won the DAZN broadcast bout by unanimous decision, with scores of 97–93, 98–92 and 98–92. Worawut was booked to make his fourth WBC-ABC title defense against the 40-fight veteran Sukpraserd Ponpitak on 15 January 2022. As the bout failed to materialize, Worawut instead faced Kompayak Porpramook in a non-title bout on 26 February 2022. He won the fight by unanimous decision.

One month later, on 26 March, Worawut faced Jelbirt Gomera. He made quick work of his opponent, stopping Gomera with a left hook at the 2:12 minute mark of the second round. Worawut made his fourth WBC-ABC title defense against Ken Jordan on 28 May 2022. He won the fight by unanimous decision, with all three judges awarding him every single round of the bout. Worawut made his fifth WBC-ABC title defense against Kevin Aseniero on 27 August 2022. He won the fight by unanimous decision, with scores of 98–92, 96–94 and 97–93.

Worawut faced the journeyman Jopher Marayan in a stay-busy fight on 26 November 2022. He won the fight by a third-round technical knockout. Worawut made his seventh WBC-ABC title defense against Jhon Gemino on 25 February 2023. He won the fight by unanimous decision. Worawut made his eighth WBC-ABC super bantamweight title defense against Brian Lobetania on 28 May 2023.

== Professional boxing record ==
29 fights	26 wins	2 losses
By knockout	16	0
By decision	10	2
Draws	1	

No.	Result	Record	Opponent	Type	Round, time	Date	Location	Notes
29	Loss	26–2–1	Yukinori Oguni	UD	8	1 Oct 2025	Korakuen Hall, Tokyo, Japan	
28	Win	26–1–1	Sukkasem Kietyongyuth	TKO	5 (6), 0:35	25 Jul 2025	Suan Lum Night Bazaar Ratchadaphisek, Bangkok, Thailand	
27	Loss	25–1–1	Sam Goodman	UD	12	10 Jul 2024	WIN Entertainment Centre, Wollongong, Australia	
26	Win	25–0–1	Peng Su	UD	6	29 Mar 2024	Max Muaythai Stadium, Pattaya, Thailand	
25	Win	24–0–1	Laldingliana	UD	10	25 Nov 2023	Suan Lum Night Bazaar Ratchadaphisek, Bangkok, Thailand	Retained WBC-ABCO super bantamweight title
24	Win	23–0–1	Sukkasem Lookmakrodyon111	UD	6	30 Sep 2023	Suan Lum Night Bazaar Ratchadaphisek, Bangkok, Thailand	
23	Win	22–0–1	Jess Rhey Waminal	UD	10	29 Jul 2023	Suan Lum Night Bazaar Ratchadaphisek, Bangkok, Thailand	Retained WBC-ABCO super bantamweight title
22	Win	21–0–1	Brian Lobetania	TKO	3 (10), 1:18	27 May 2023	Thupatemi Stadium, Pathum Thani, Thailand	Retained WBC-ABCO super bantamweight title
21	Win	20–0–1	Jhon Gemino	UD	10	25 Feb 2023	Thupatemi Stadium, Pathum Thani, Thailand	Retained WBC-ABCO super bantamweight title
20	Win	19–0–1	Jopher Marayan	TKO	3 (6)	26 Nov 2022	Suan Lum Night Bazaar Ratchadaphisek, Bangkok, Thailand	
19	Win	18–0–1	Kevin Aseniero	UD	10	27 Aug 2022	Suan Lum Night Bazaar Ratchadaphisek, Bangkok, Thailand	Retained WBC-ABCO super bantamweight title
18	Win	17–0–1	Ken Jordan	UD	10	28 May 2022	Suan Lum Night Bazaar Ratchadaphisek, Bangkok, Thailand	Retained WBC-ABCO super bantamweight title
17	Win	16–0–1	Jelbirt Gomera	KO	2 (10), 2:12	26 Mar 2022	Suan Lum Night Bazaar Ratchadaphisek, Bangkok, Thailand	Retained WBC-ABCO super bantamweight title
16	Win	15–0–1	Kompayak Porpramook	UD	10	26 Feb 2022	Suan Lum Night Bazaar Ratchadaphisek, Bangkok, Thailand	
15	Win	14–0–1	Pungluang Sor Singyu	UD	10	13 Mar 2021	Workpoint Studio, Bang Phun, Thailand	Retained WBC-ABCO super bantamweight title
14	Win	13–0–1	Anurak Madua	TKO	2 (6)	5 Dec 2020	Workpoint Studio, Bang Phun, Thailand	
13	Win	12–0–1	Joel Kwong	TKO	4 (10)	5 Sep 2020	Workpoint Studio, Bang Phun, Thailand	Retained WBC-ABCO super bantamweight title
12	Win	11–0–1	Jomar Fajardo	KO	2 (6)	1 Aug 2020	Workpoint Studio, Bang Phun, Thailand	
11	Win	10–0–1	Artid Bamrungauea	TKO	3 (6)	7 Mar 2020	Workpoint Studio, Bang Phun, Thailand	
10	Win	9–0–1	Daichi Matsuura	UD	12	21 Dec 2019	Workpoint Studio, Bang Phun, Thailand	Retained WBC-ABCO super bantamweight title
9	Win	8–0–1	Alvin Medura	TKO	6 (10), 1:35	19 Oct 2019	Workpoint Studio, Bang Phun, Thailand	Won vacant WBC-ABCO super bantamweight title
8	Win	7–0–1	Hendrik Barongsay	TKO	4 (6)	21 Sep 2019	Workpoint Studio, Bang Phun, Thailand	
7	Win	6–0–1	Matthew Arcillas	KO	2 (6)	17 Aug 2019	Workpoint Studio, Bang Phun, Thailand	
6	Win	5–0–1	Bingcheng Zou	TKO	1 (10), 1:24	20 Jul 2019	Workpoint Studio, Bang Phun, Thailand	Retained WBC Youth super bantamweight title
5	Win	4–0–1	Muhammad Ashiq	TKO	2 (10), 1:33	20 Apr 2019	Workpoint Studio, Bang Phun, Thailand	Won vacant WBC Youth super bantamweight title
4	Draw	3–0–1	Nirundon Thata	SD	8	17 Nov 2018	Workpoint Studio, Bang Phun, Thailand	
3	Win	3–0	Yuya Nakamura	TKO	1 (6), 2:20	18 Aug 2018	Workpoint Studio, Bang Phun, Thailand	
2	Win	2–0	Worawatchai Boonjan	KO	2 (8)	21 Jul 2018	Workpoint Studio, Bang Phun, Thailand	
1	Win	1–0	Hui Lu	KO	2 (6)	19 May 2018	Workpoint Studio, Bang Phun, Thailand	

== Muay Thai record ==
Muay Thai Record
Date	Result	Opponent	Event	Location	Method	Round	Time
2016-01-12	Win	(Thailand) Rachasak Sor.Arisa		Chaiyaphum province, Thailand	Decision	5	3:00
2015-12-19	Loss	(Thailand) Laisuea OrBor.Tor Nonthong	Chaopho Phaya Lae Festival	Chaiyaphum province, Thailand	Decision	5	3:00
2015-03-29	Win	(Thailand) Bank Por.Charoenphaet		Nonthaburi province, Thailand	TKO	4	
2014-10-07	Loss	(Thailand) Petchkriangkrai Rachanon	Kiatpetch, Lumpinee Stadium	Bangkok, Thailand	Decision	5	3:00
2014-09-03	Win	(Thailand) Petchpimai Tor.Thepsutin	Jitmuangnon, Rajadamnern Stadium	Bangkok, Thailand	KO (Left hook)	1	
2014-07-24	Loss	(Thailand) Khanthep Koratsportschool	Kiatpetch	Isan, Thailand	Decision	5	3:00
2014-05-20	Loss	(Thailand) Daopayak Sakplaipraya	Lumpinee Stadium	Bangkok, Thailand	TKO (Knees)	4	
2014-02-25	Loss	(Thailand) Yodsila Fairtex	Saengmorakot, Lumpinee Stadium	Bangkok, Thailand	Decision	5	3:00
2014-	Draw	(Thailand) Daopayak Sakplaipraya	Channel 7 Stadium	Bangkok, Thailand	Decision	5	3:00
2013-11-19	Loss	(Thailand) Kumantong Jitmuangnon	Sangmorakot, Lumpinee Stadium	Bangkok, Thailand	Decision	5	3:00
2013-09-15	Win	(Thailand) NongDom ChaiyutKongsib113	Channel 7 Stadium	Bangkok, Thailand	KO	1	
2013-08-04	Win	(Thailand) Bowie SorKor.SuhaiGym	Channel 7 Stadium	Bangkok, Thailand	Decision	5	3:00
2013-07-	Loss	(Thailand) Dennua Lukbandon		Lopburi province, Thailand	Decision	5	3:00
2013-05-01	Win	(Thailand) Petchtai Kiatnadee	Wanmeechai, Rajadamnern Stadium	Bangkok, Thailand	KO	2	
2012-07-06	Loss	(Thailand) Sam-D PetchyindeeAcademy	Petchpiya, Lumpinee Stadium	Bangkok, Thailand	Decision	5	3:00
2012-05-04	Win	(Thailand) Yodkhunsuk Sor.Suchat	Lumpinee Stadium	Bangkok, Thailand	KO	1	
2010-05-01	Win	(Thailand) Komin Ratchanon	Lumpinee Krikkrai, Lumpinee Stadium	Bangkok, Thailand	Decision	5	3:00
Legend: Win Loss Draw/No contest Notes

Amateur Muay Thai Record
Date	Result	Opponent	Event	Location	Method	Round	Time
2017-08-29	Loss	(Malaysia) Ain Kamarrudin	2017 SEA Games Muay Thai Tournamaent, Final	Kuala Lumpur, Malaysia	Decision (29:28)	3	3:00
Wins 2017 SEA Games Muay Thai 57kg Silver Medal.
2017-08-28	Win	(Vietnam) Nguyễn Trần Duy Nhất	2017 SEA Games Muay Thai Tournamaent, Semifinals	Kuala Lumpur, Malaysia	Decision (30:27)	3	3:00
Legend: Win Loss Draw/No contest Notes
