= TJ Doheny =

Irish boxer

Personal information
- Nickname: The Power
- Born: Terence John Doheny; November 2, 1986 (age 39) Portlaoise, Ireland
- Height: 5 ft 6 in (168 cm)
- Weight: Super bantamweight; Featherweight; Super featherweight; Lightweight

Boxing career
- Reach: 68 in (173 cm)
- Stance: Southpaw

Boxing record
- Total fights: 32
- Wins: 26
- Win by KO: 20
- Losses: 6

Terence John Doheny (born 2 November 1986) is an Irish professional boxer who held the IBF super-bantamweight title from 2018 to 2019. Nicknamed "Power", Doheny is known for his exceptional punching power, possessing a knockout ratio of 76.92%.

As of August 2024, Doheny is ranked as the world's seventh best active super bantamweight by The Ring.

== Professional career ==
=== Doheny vs. Iwasa ===
TJ turned professional in 2012 and compiled a record of 19–0 with 14 wins by knockout before challenging and beating Japanese fighter Ryosuke Iwasa to win the IBF super bantamweight championship.

=== Doheny vs. Roman ===
He would defend the title once before losing in a very close unification fight to WBA super bantamweight champion Daniel Roman by a majority decision.

=== Doheny vs. Inoue ===
Doheny challenged Naoya Inoue for his undisputed super bantamweight title at Ariake Arena in Tokyo, Japan on September 3, 2024. Doheny was stopped in the 7th round with a body shot. This was the first knockout loss of Doheny's career.

=== Doheny vs. Ball ===
On 12 December 2024, it was announced that Doheny would challenge WBA featherweight champion Nick Ball at M&S Bank Arena in Liverpool, England, on 15 March 2025. Doheny lost the fight by technical stoppage when his corner stopped it at the end of the tenth round.

== Professional boxing record ==
32 fights	26 wins	6 losses
By knockout	20	2
By decision	6	4

No.	Result	Record	Opponent	Type	Round, time	Date	Location	Notes
32	Loss	26–6	Nick Ball	RTD	10 (12), 3:00	15 Mar 2025	M&S Bank Arena, Liverpool, England	For WBA featherweight title
31	Loss	26–5	Naoya Inoue	TKO	7 (12), 0:16	3 Sep 2024	Ariake Arena, Tokyo, Japan	For WBA (Super), WBC, IBF, WBO, and The Ring super bantamweight titles
30	Win	26–4	Bryl Bayogos	TKO	4 (8) 2:51	6 May 2024	Tokyo Dome, Tokyo, Japan	
29	Win	25–4	Japhethlee Llamido	TKO	1 (12) 2:28	31 Oct 2023	Korakuen Hall, Tokyo, Japan	Retained WBO Asia Pacific super-bantamweight title
28	Win	24–4	Kazuki Nakajima	TKO	4 (12), 2:23	29 June 2023	Korakuen Hall, Tokyo, Japan	Won WBO Asia Pacific super-bantamweight title
27	Loss	23–4	Sam Goodman	UD	10	12 Mar 2023	Qudos Bank Arena, Sydney, Australia	For vacant WBO Oriental super-bantamweight titles
26	Win	23–3	Cesar Juarez	TKO	2 (10), 2:23	19 Mar 2022	Duty Free Tennis Stadium, Dubai, UAE	
25	Loss	22–3	Michael Conlan	UD	12	6 Aug 2021	Falls Park, Belfast, Northern Ireland	For vacant WBA interim featherweight title
24	Loss	22–2	Ionuț Băluță	UD	8	6 Mar 2020	Caesars Palace, Dubai, UAE	
23	Win	22–1	Jesus Martinez	RTD	5 (8), 3:00	12 Oct 2019	Wintrust Arena, Chicago, Illinois, US	
22	Loss	21–1	Daniel Roman	MD	12	26 Apr 2019	The Forum, Inglewood, California, US	Lost IBF super-bantamweight title; For WBA (Super) super-bantamweight title
21	Win	21–0	Ryohei Takahashi	TKO	11 (12), 2:18	18 Jan 2019	Hulu Theater, New York City, New York, US	Retained IBF super-bantamweight title
20	Win	20–0	Ryosuke Iwasa	UD	12	16 Aug 2018	Korakuen Hall, Tokyo, Japan	Won IBF super-bantamweight title
19	Win	19–0	Mike Oliver	TKO	2 (8), 2:18	17 Mar 2018	House of Blues, Boston, Massachusetts, US	
18	Win	18–0	Pipat Chaiporn	SD	12	20 Dec 2017	Suan Lum Night Bazaar, Bangkok, Thailand	
17	Win	17–0	Espinos Sabu	TKO	1 (8), 2:15	2 Jun 2017	Club Punchbowl, Sydney, Australia	
16	Win	16–0	Ernesto Guerrero	TKO	2 (8), 1:58	15 Oct 2016	Memorial Hall, Melrose, Massachusetts, US	
15	Win	15–0	Gerardo Marin Hernandez	TKO	5 (10), 1:40	19 Mar 2016	House of Blues, Boston, Massachusetts, US	Retained PABA super-bantamweight title
14	Win	14–0	Noldi Manakane	KO	2 (8), 0:30	12 Dec 2015	Alexandria Basketball Stadium, Sydney, Australia	
13	Win	13–0	Sutep Wangmuk	TKO	5 (12), 2:18	3 Oct 2015	Alexandria Basketball Stadium, Sydney, Australia	Retained PABA super-bantamweight title
12	Win	12–0	Prayoot Yaijam	TKO	1 (8), 1:25	4 Jul 2015	Club Punchbowl, Sydney, Australia	
11	Win	11–0	Marco Demecillo	UD	12	15 May 2015	Club Punchbowl, Sydney, Australia	Retained PABA super-bantamweight title
10	Win	10–0	Phum Kunmat	UD	8	20 May 2015	Entertainment Centre, Sydney, Australia	
9	Win	9–0	Egy Rozten	RTD	3 (8), 3:00	15 Nov 2014	The Hi-Fi Sydney, Sydney, Australia	
8	Win	8–0	Roman Canto	TKO	9 (12), 1:00	19 Sep 2014	Ottimo House, Sydney, Australia	Retained PABA super-bantamweight title
7	Win	7–0	Somprasong Chuenchana	TKO	3 (12), 2:25	15 Mar 2014	The Roundhouse, Sydney, Australia	Retained PABA super-bantamweight title
6	Win	6–0	Dianever Orcales	UD	12	13 Dec 2013	Olympic Park Sports Centre, Sydney, Australia	Retained PABA super-bantamweight title
5	Win	5–0	James Mokoginta	KO	9 (12), 2:59	17 Aug 2013	RSL Club, Coffs Harbour, Australia	Won vacant PABA super-bantamweight title
4	Win	4–0	Anusorn Chaisura	TKO	3 (6), 1:30	22 Feb 2013	Entertainment Centre, Hurstville, Australia	
3	Win	3–0	Roberto Oyan	UD	6	14 Sep 2012	Irish Club, Brisbane, Australia	
2	Win	2–0	Chris Potter	TKO	1 (4), 0:31	22 Jun 2012	Entertainment Centre, Sydney, Australia	
1	Win	1–0	Pichit Sithkruwin	TKO	1 (4), 1:27	27 Apr 2012	Entertainment Centre, Sydney, Australia	

== See also ==
- List of southpaw stance boxers
- List of world super-bantamweight boxing champions

Sporting positions
Regional boxing titles
Vacant Title last held by Dianever Orcales	PABA super-bantamweight champion 17 August 2013 – 16 August 2018; Won world title	Vacant Title next held by Anurak Thisa
Preceded by Kazuki Nakajima	WBO Asia Pacific super-bantamweight champion 29 June 2023 – present	Incumbent
World boxing titles
Preceded by Ryosuke Iwasa	IBF super-bantamweight champion 16 August 2018 – 26 April 2019	Succeeded by Daniel Roman
