= Petchbarngborn Kokietgym =

Thai boxer (born 1985)

Personal information
- Nickname: Gap
- Born: Karoon Jarupianlerd; 15 August 1985 (age 40) Bang Khun Thian (now Bang Bon), Bangkok, Thailand
- Height: 165 cm (5 ft 5 in)
- Weight: Super flyweight

Boxing career
- Reach: 170 cm (67 in)
- Stance: Orthodox

Boxing record
- Total fights: 53
- Wins: 44
- Win by KO: 20
- Losses: 9

Karoon Jarupianlerd (Thai: การุณ จารุเพียรเลิศ, born 15 August 1985), known professionally as Petchbarngborn Kokietgym or Petchbarngborn Sor Thanapinyo (เพชรบางบอน ก่อเกียรติยิม, เพชรบางบอน ส.ธนภิญโญ), is a Thai professional boxer who fights in the super-flyweight division.

== Biography & career ==
Karoon was born in Khwaeng, Bang Bon (then part of the Bang Khun Thian District) on the Thonburi side of Bangkok. He began his fighting career in childhood through Muay Thai. His father, Wissanuchai "Hua Taxi" Jarupianlerd, was the owner of a Muay Thai gym and a manager of several fighters. Believing that Karoon would not succeed in Muay Thai, Wissanuchai allowed his son to switch to professional boxing under Sor Thanapinyo Gym. He made his professional debut on 1 June 2009 at the Rajadamnern Stadium, losing a 6-round PTS decision to Weerasak Chuwatana.

He had many opportunities to fight abroad in his first year as a professional, including once in Bhutan and twice in Japan, although he lost more often than he won, going 5–1 in his first six fights. Following this, he fought locally in Thailand for the next two years, where he went on a 13-fight winning streak. Around this time, Wissanuchai introduced him to Kokiet "Sia Ko" Panichyarom of Kokiet Boxing Group. On 12 May 2011, Karoon faced Wandee Singwancha, a former WBC minimumweight World Champion. Karoon defeated Wandee by an 8-round technical decision, winning the WBC Asia super-flyweight title in his most significant victory to date. On 10 September 2012, he faced future WBA super-flyweight champion Kohei Kono, at Korakuen Hall, Japan, in what was Karoon's first fight abroad in two years. He lost by unanimous decision after eight rounds.

On June 4, 2016, he was scheduled to face British boxer Paul Butler in an eliminator bout at Echo Arena, Liverpool. The winner would have earned a shot at the WBO super-flyweight title held by Japan's Naoya Inoue. However, the fight was canceled because Butler failed to make the 115-pound weight limit.

Karoon was still granted a chance to fight Inoue later that year on September 4, at Sky Arena in Zama, Japan. He was trained by former WBC flyweight champion Chatchai Sasakul for the bout. Unfortunately, Karoon lost by knockout in the tenth round.

== Titles ==
Regional & International Titles:

- Rajadamnern Stadium Light flyweight Champion (November 2009) (108 lbs)
- ABCO Super flyweight Champion (May 2011) (115 lbs)
- WBA Asia Super flyweight Champion (October 2012) (115 lbs)
- WBO Oriental Super flyweight Champion (June 2013) (115 lbs)
- WBO Asia pacific Super flyweight Champion (July 2014) (115 lbs)
- PABA Super flyweight Champion (January 2017) (115 lbs)
