= Ramon Cardenas =

American boxer

Personal information
- Nickname: Dinamita
- Born: November 7, 1995 (age 31) San Antonio, Texas, USA
- Height: 5 ft 5 in (165 cm)
- Weight: Super bantamweight; Featherweight; Super featherweight; Lightweight

Boxing career
- Reach: 67 in (170 cm)
- Stance: Orthodox

Boxing record
- Total fights: 30
- Wins: 28
- Win by KO: 15
- Losses: 2

Ramon Cardenas (born November 7, 1995) is an American professional boxer who has competed in the super bantamweight division since 2015. He challenged for the undisputed world super-bantamweight title in 2025.

== Professional career ==
Cardenas made his professional debut against Jonathan Hernandez on July 25, 2015. He won the fight by knockout in the first round.

Ramon Cardenas faced Rafael Pedroza at the Boeing Center in San Antonio, Texas on September 15, 2023. Cardenas won the fight by KO in the second round.

On April 24, 2024, Cardenas faced Jesus Ramirez Rubio for the vacant WBA Continental North America super bantamweight title. Cardenas won the fight by KO in the 9th round.

On March 12, 2025, it was announced that Cardenas would challenge undisputed super bantamweight champion Naoya Inoue on May 4, 2025 at the T-Mobile Arena in Las Vegas, Nevada. Cardenas lost the fight by technical knockout in the eighth round. In the second round, he managed to score a knockdown, but was dropped himself in the seventh. At the time of stoppage, Cardenas was behind on all three judges scorecards, having lost every round except the second.

Cardenas got back to winning ways in his next fight with a fifth round knockout of Erik Robles Ayala at War Memorial Auditorium in Fort Lauderdale, Florida, on December 18, 2025.

He defeated Leonardo Carrillo via split decision at the USC Galen Center in Los Angeles, California, on August 29, 2026. Two of the ringside judges scoring the fight 98–92 and 96–94 in his favour, while the third had it a 97–93 for his opponent.

== Professional boxing record ==
30 fights	28 wins	2 losses
By knockout	15	1
By decision	13	1

No.	Result	Record	Opponent	Type	Round, time	Date	Location	Notes
30	Win	28–2	Leonardo Carrillo	SD	10	Aug 29, 2026	USC Galen Center, Los Angeles, California, US	
29	Win	27–2	Erik Robles Ayala	KO	5 (10), 1:21	Dec 18, 2025	War Memorial Auditorium, Fort Lauderdale, Florida, US	
28	Loss	26–2	Naoya Inoue	TKO	8 (12), 0:45	May 4, 2025	T-Mobile Arena, Paradise, Nevada, U.S.	For WBA (Super), WBC, IBF, WBO and The Ring super bantamweight titles
27	Win	26–1	Bryan Acosta	UD	10	Feb 8, 2025	Boeing Center at Tech Port, San Antonio, Texas, US	Retained WBA Continental Latin America super bantamweight title
26	Win	25–1	Jesus Ramirez Rubio	KO	9 (10), 1:37	Apr 24, 2024	ProBox TV Events Center, Plant City, Florida, US	Won vacant WBA Continental Latin America super bantamweight title
25	Win	24–1	Israel Rodriguez Picazo	RTD	6 (10), 3:00	Feb 16, 2024	Whitesands Events Center, Plant City, Florida, US	Won vacant WBC FECARBOX super bantamweight title
24	Win	23–1	Rafael Pedroza	KO	2 (10), 1:22	Sep 15, 2023	Boeing Center at Tech Port, San Antonio, Texas US	Won WBA Continental Americas super bantamweight title
23	Win	22–1	Rodrigo Guerrero	RTD	2 (6), 3:00	May 26, 2023	Smoke Sky Bar, San Antonio, Texas, US	
22	Win	21–1	Michell Banquez	UD	10	Jul 9, 2022	Alamodome, San Antonio, Texas, US	
21	Win	20–1	Marvin Solano	TKO	3 (10), 1:05	Aug 14, 2021	Caribe Royale Orlando, Orlando, Florida, US	Won vacant WBA Continental bantamweight title
20	Win	19–1	Angel Antonio Contreras	SD	8	Feb 20, 2021	Caribe Royale Orlando, Orlando, Florida, US	
19	Win	18–1	Eduardo Martinez	UD	6	Nov 30, 2019	Centro de Alto Rendimiento, Cancun, Mexico	
18	Win	17–1	Ryan Lee Allen	SD	6	Mar 24, 2019	MGM National Harbor, Oxon Hill, Maryland, U.S.	
17	Win	16–1	Ramsey Luna	UD	10	Oct 27, 2018	San Antonio Shrine Auditorium, San Antonio, Texas, U.S.	
16	Win	15–1	Juan Carlos Guillen	TKO	6 (8), 0:52	Jun 23, 2018	Alzafar Shrine, San Antonio, Texas	
15	Win	14–1	Nestor Robledo	TKO	4 (10), 0:51	Nov 28, 2017	Arena El Jefe, Monterrey, Mexico	
14	Win	13–1	Gabino Hernandez	UD	6	Sep 26, 2017	Arena El Jefe, Monterrey, Mexico	
13	Loss	12–1	Danny Flores	MD	10	Apr 25, 2017	Arena El Jefe, Monterrey, Mexico	
12	Win	12–0	Victor Rosas	UD	6	Mar 4, 2017	Last Chance Ministries, San Antonio, Texas	
11	Win	11–0	Luis Vara Carrillo	TKO	1 (8), 1:57	Feb 10, 2017	Gimnasio Nuevo León Unido, Monterrey, Mexico	
10	Win	10–0	Eliud Montoya Gonzalez	TKO	3 (6), 2:10	Nov 29, 2016	Arena El Jefe, Monterrey, Mexico	
9	Win	9–0	Miguel Angel Rodriguez Lara	TKO	2 (6), 2:06	Oct 25, 2016	Gimnasio Nuevo León Unido, Monterrey, Mexico	
8	Win	8–0	Ivan Najera Cordero	UD	6	Sep 13, 2016	Arena El Jefe, Monterrey, Mexico	
7	Win	7–0	Luis Araujo Ramirez	TKO	3 (6),	Jun 28, 2016	Arena El Jefe, Monterrey, Mexico	
6	Win	6–0	Jose Maria Olivares	TKO	2 (6), 1:32	May 31, 2016	Arena El Jefe, Monterrey, Mexico	
5	Win	5–0	Isau Duenez	UD	4	May 28, 2016	Cowboys Dance Hall, San Antonio, Texas	
4	Win	4–0	Lavale Wilson	KO	1 (4), 1:53	Jan 16, 2016	International Center for Trade, Eagle Pass, Texas, US	
3	Win	3–0	Jamie Hernandez	UD	4	Oct 6, 2015	Cowboys Dance Hall, San Antonio, Texas, US	
2	Win	2–0	Porfirio Arellano	UD	4	Aug 8, 2015	Event Center, San Antonio, Texas, US	
1	Win	1–0	Jonathan Hernandez	KO	1 (4), 2:15	Jul 25, 2015	Piedras Negras, Mexico	
