= Naoya Inoue =

Japanese boxer (born 1993)

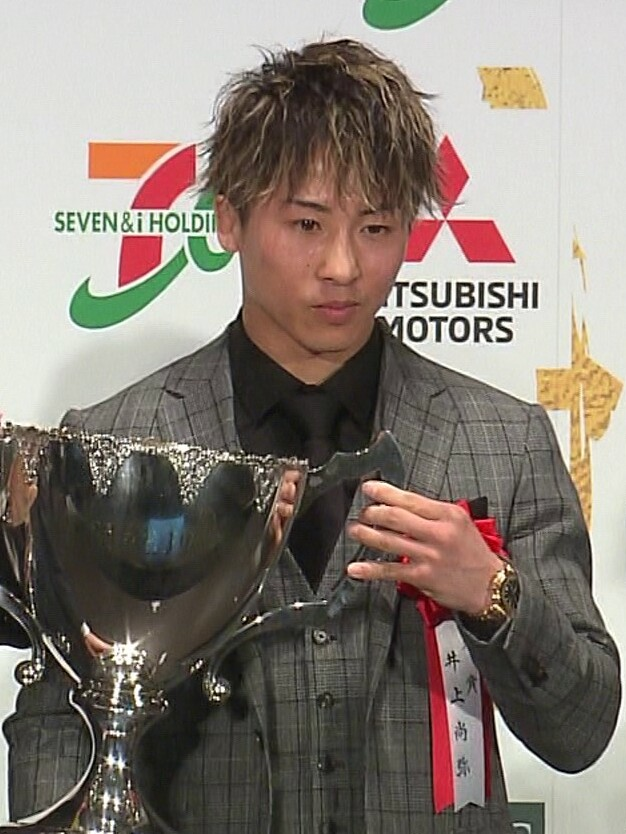
- Inoue in 2023

Personal information
- Native name: 井上 尚弥
- Nicknames: The Monster (怪物 Kaibutsu)
- Born: 10 April 1993 (age 33) Zama, Kanagawa, Japan
- Height: 5 ft 5 in (165 cm)
- Weight: Light flyweight; Flyweight; Super flyweight; Bantamweight; Super bantamweight

Signature
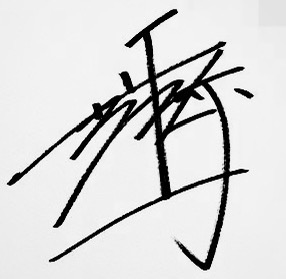

Boxing career
- Reach: 67 1/2 in (171 cm)
- Stance: Orthodox

Boxing record
- Total fights: 33
- Wins: 33
- Win by KO: 27
Medal record
Men's amateur boxing
Representing Japan
Asian Youth Championships
Bronze medal – third place	2010 Tehran	Light flyweight

Naoya Inoue (井上 尚弥), Inoue Naoya; born (10 April 1993) is a Japanese professional boxer. He has held multiple world championships in four weight classes, and is one of only three male boxers to become the undisputed champion in two weight classes in the "four-belt era" (alongside Terence Crawford and Oleksandr Usyk). Nicknamed "The Monster" (怪物 Kaibutsu), he is widely regarded as the greatest Japanese boxer of all time and one of the greatest boxers of his era. Inoue is known for his exceptional punching power and excellent technical skill, possessing a knockout-to-win percentage of 81.82%.

He is the first and only boxer to win the undisputed championship (Note: Four-belt era: World Boxing Association (WBA) (Super version), World Boxing Council (WBC), International Boxing Federation (IBF), and World Boxing Organization (WBO) titles) at super bantamweight, having held all four major world titles since 2023, as well as the Ring magazine title. Previously he held the undisputed championship and the Ring title at bantamweight between 2022 and 2023. He became the first undisputed bantamweight champion since Enrique Pinder in 1972, and the first boxer in history to do so in the four-belt era.

Earlier in his career, Inoue held the World Boxing Council (WBC) light flyweight title in 2014, the World Boxing Organization (WBO) junior bantamweight title from 2014 to 2018, and the World Boxing Association (WBA) bantamweight title (Unified version) from 2018 to 2019. He won the 2018–19 World Boxing Super Series bantamweight tournament.

Since May 2026, he has been ranked as the No. 1 pound for pound boxer in the world by The Ring, TBRB, ESPN, and BoxRec.

In June 2022, Inoue became the first Japanese boxer to be ranked No. 1 in the world, pound for pound, by The Ring. He was named Fighter of the Year in 2023 by The Ring, the Boxer Writers Association of America, and ESPN.

== Early life ==
Inoue was born into a family with a strong boxing heritage, with his father, Shingo Inoue, being a former amateur boxer and coach who played a pivotal role in Inoue's early training. Inoue began his boxing journey before the age of eight, influenced by his father's guidance and the family's overall commitment to the sport, which also included his younger brother, Takuma Inoue, a professional boxer.

His childhood was marked by discipline and focus, characteristics that would later shape his boxing style. Under his father's mentorship, he honed his foundational skills, emphasizing technique, mental resilience, and a strong work ethic. This dedication became crucial throughout his amateur and professional boxing careers. By the time he reached elementary and junior high school, Inoue was actively training and participating in local boxing clubs, where his talent began to attract attention and recognition.

== Amateur career ==
Inoue won the Japanese Interscholastic Athletic Meeting and the Japanese Junior National Championships in 2009. In 2010, he took the bronze medal in the Asian Youth Championships in Tehran, Iran, and won the Japanese Junior Selection Tournament. He then participated in the AIBA Youth World Championships, but lost to Yosvany Veitía in the third preliminary round. He finished in the second place at the Japanese National Championships in the same year.

In July 2011, he took the gold medal in the 21st President's Cup in Jakarta, Indonesia. He subsequently won the first place in the Japanese Interscholastic Athletic Meeting in that year. However, he was eliminated in the third round by Yosvany Veitía in the 2011 World Amateur Boxing Championships at the Heydar Aliyev Sports and Exhibition Complex in Baku, Azerbaijan, and lost to Birzhan Zhakypov in the final at the 2012 Asian Boxing Olympic Qualification Tournament in Astana, Kazakhstan. Inoue holds a KO win over Kenshiro Teraji in the amateurs. Inoue's amateur record was 75–6 (48 KOs).

== Professional career ==
=== Light flyweight ===
In his professional debut, Inoue knocked Crison Omayao down in the first round and the fourth round, winning by KO at 2 minutes and 4 seconds in the fourth round.

On 5 January 2013, Inoue made light work of Thai national champion Ngaoprajan Chuwatana, by scoring a first-round knockout.

Inoue's third pro fight took place on 16 April 2013, against Yūki Sano. In the first round, Inoue cut his opponent's right eye with a left hook, and in the second round, Inoue knocked Sano down with a left hook after feinting a left body blow. However, in the third round, Inoue injured his right fist when his right straight hit Sano's head. After that, Inoue was unable to land a right punch and was forced to fight with just his left hand, but in the fourth round, Inoue knocked Sano down with a series of left hooks and won by TKO at 1 minute and 9 seconds in the tenth round.

On 25 August 2013, Inoue captured the Japanese light flyweight title from Ryoichi Taguchi. With this victory, Inoue became the first Japanese champion in 23 years to win the title in just four fights, tying the record held by Joichiro Tatsuyoshi.

Inoue then fought for the vacant OPBF light flyweight title against Filipino light flyweight champion Jerson Mancio on 6 December 2013 on the undercard of Yaegashi-Sosa. Inoue defeated Mancio with a 5th-round TKO to claim the regional title.

In his sixth pro fight, Inoue stopped Adrián Hernández by TKO in the sixth round to win the WBC light flyweight championship at Ota-City General Gymnasium on 6 April 2014.

On 5 September 2014, Inoue faced Samartlek Kokietgym (17–5, 5 KOs) at the Yoyogi National Gymnasium, winning every round on all scorecards. He knocked his opponent down in the fourth and sixth rounds, and won by TKO in the eleventh round at 1 minute and 8 seconds, successfully defending his title for the first time. After the fight, Inoue announced that he would relinquish his title and move up a weight class.

=== Super flyweight ===
In November 2014, Inoue vacated his light flyweight title and moved up two weight classes to super flyweight to challenge two division champion and current WBO junior bantamweight title holder Omar Andrés Narváez. Inoue won the fight by body shot KO in the 2nd round.

On 29 December 2015, Inoue faced Warlito Parrenas. The referee waved off the fight in the second round, after Parrenas was dropped twice and he could not get up, giving Inoue a KO win.

On 8 May 2016, Inoue faced his WBO challenger David Carmona. In the second round, he hit Carmona's temple with a right straight and injured his right hand. However, he went on to win the fight by unanimous decision and successfully defend his title for the second time.

Inoue's third defense came against Petchbarngborn Kokietgym on 4 September 2016. Inoue won the fight by KO at 3 minutes and 3 seconds of round 10, successfully defending his title for the third time.

On 9 November, it was announced that Inoue's fourth defense would come against Kohei Kono on 30 December 2016. Kono was a two-time super flyweight champion. Inoue won the fight in the sixth round.

During 2016, Inoue repeatedly sought a unification bout against four-division champion and current WBC super flyweight champion Román González. However, González chose to face Carlos Cuadras instead in the second half of the year. And Inoue was in attendance for the González vs Cuadras fight. Shortly after González's win over Cuadras, representatives of Inoue sent a formal offer to González for what would've been a unification showdown. González stipulated that the terms offered for an Inoue fight weren't good enough, and turned down the contract.

Inoue's fifth defense of his WBO title came against Ricardo Rodríguez in May 2017 and he won the fight in the 3rd round following a flurry of punches.

Inoue joined the HBO Boxing After Dark card "Superfly" set at the StubHub Center on 9 September 2017 against Antonio Nieves and Inoue won the bout.

On 16 November, it was announced that Inoue would face Yan Boyeaux on 30 December, in a show televised by Fuji TV. Inoue dropped Boyeaux four times before referee Raul Caiz Jr. eventually stepped in at 1 minute and 40 seconds of round 3, giving Inoue the win, retaining the WBO title for the seventh time.

=== Bantamweight ===
On 6 March, Inoue held a press conference in Japan announcing he would be making his bantamweight debut against WBA bantamweight champion Jamie McDonnell (29–2–1, 13 KOs) at the Ota-City General Gymnasium in Tokyo, Japan on 25 May 2018.

Inoue knocked out McDonnell in the first round. McDonnell was sent down to the canvas after Inoue landed a left hook to his temple. The referee waved the fight off within less than a round declaring Inoue the TKO victor. Inoue became the only fighter to stop McDonnell and defeat him at bantamweight.

==== World Boxing Super Series ====
After defeating McDonnell, Inoue said, "I'll participate in the World Boxing Super Series to face other world champions with pleasure," confirming he would take part in the bantamweight tournament, where he would meet other world champions, WBA 'Super champion' Ryan Burnett, WBO champion Zolani Tete (27–3, 21 KOs) and IBF champion Emmanuel Rodríguez.

At the draft gala on 20 July, Inoue chose to defend his WBA title against former WBA (Undisputed) bantamweight champion Juan Carlo Payano in the quarter-final. The fight was announced to take place on 7 October at the Yokohama Arena in Yokohama, Japan.

Inoue won the fight with a first-round knockout. It was a right hand just 70 seconds into their scheduled 12-round bout. Inoue connected with a jab before blasting Payano with a straight right hand that put Payano flat on his back and unable to continue. Referee Pinit Prayadsab immediately stopped the fight at 1:10 into the first round. Inoue became the first fighter to stop Payano. The knockout was later voted the Ring magazine Knockout of the Year.

IBF bantamweight champion Emmanuel Rodríguez defeated Jason Moloney via decision in October 2018, booking his place into the semi-final against Inoue. The fight was set to take place at the SSE Hydro in Glasgow, Scotland, on 18 May 2019.

On 18 May, Inoue advanced to the final by knocking out undefeated Rodríguez in the second round. Inoue dropped Rodríguez three times in quick succession before the fight was stopped at 1:20 of the second round. Inoue became the first fighter to stop Rodriguez.

==== World Boxing Super Series final ====
Inoue was set to face Nonito Donaire in the World Boxing Super Series finals on 7 November 2019. Inoue won the fight by unanimous decision. After the fight, Inoue was presented the Muhammad Ali Trophy by Fighting Harada. Inoue revealed he had suffered a fractured orbital bone and broken nose during the fight. The fight was later voted the Ring magazine Fight of the Year.

==== Unified bantamweight champion ====
Inoue was originally supposed to face then-WBO champion John Riel Casimero on 25 April 2020 in Las Vegas. However, the fight was cancelled due to COVID-19 restrictions. The fight was still discussed later in the year, however Bob Arum, of Top Rank, who were organising the event, stated that Casimero would need to take a reduced purse. Instead, Inoue fought Australian contender Jason Moloney on 31 October at the MGM Grand Conference Center in Las Vegas, Nevada. Inoue landed a short right hand to drop Moloney and score a knockout victory. Referee Kenny Bayless stopped the fight at 2:59 of the 7th round. Inoue became the first fighter to stop Moloney.

Inoue fought his IBF mandatory challenger and IBO bantamweight champion Michael Dasmariñas on 19 June 2021 in Paradise, Nevada. He scored three knockdowns in the span of three rounds, each one with a left hook to the body of Dasmariñas, to win via third-round stoppage.

It was announced on 21 October 2021, that Inoue would be defending his bantamweight world titles in a voluntary defense against IBF No. 6 ranked contender Aran Dipaen on 14 December 2021, at the Ryōgoku Kokugikan in Tokyo. Inoue won the fight by an eight-round technical knockout. Inoue knocked Dipaen down with a left hook in the eighth round, and staggered Dipaen by a second left hook as soon as the action resumed, which prompted referee Michiaki Someya to wave the fight off. Inoue was later named the 2021 "Fighter of the Year" by the Japanese Boxing Commission.

==== Inoue vs. Donaire II ====
Inoue made his fifth title defense as a unified bantamweight champion in a title unification bout with the reigning WBC champion Nonito Donaire on 7 June 2022, at the Saitama Super Arena in Saitama, Japan. Inoue won the rematch by a second-round technical knockout. After knocking Donaire down at the very end of the first round, Inoue once again staggered him with a left hook near the start of the second round, before finishing him with a flurry of punches at the 1:24-minute mark of the round. He became the only fighter to stop Donaire at bantamweight. Inoue was ranked as the number one pound for pound boxer by The Ring after this victory, thus becoming the first Japanese boxer to reach that milestone.

==== Undisputed bantamweight champion ====
On 25 August 2022, it was announced that Inoue would face 2 time bantamweight champion and the current reigning WBO bantamweight champion Paul Butler in a title unification bout on 13 December 2022, at the Ariake Arena in Tokyo, Japan. Inoue won the fight by an eleventh-round knockout, as he stopped Butler with repeated body shots at the 1:09-minute mark of the round. He was up 100–90 on all three scorecards at the time of the stoppage.

With this win, Inoue became the first undisputed bantamweight champion since Enrique Pinder in 1972 and the first undisputed bantamweight champion in four-belt era. He also became the first-ever Japanese and Asian boxer to claim undisputed championship status in the three- or four-belt era, as well as the first and only boxer in history to defeat all four major sanctioning organisation champions by knockout. And with this win, he also set the new record for the most wins in unified title bouts in bantamweight history, at 7, surpassing the great bantamweight legend Rubén Olivares. Inoue vacated all five titles on 13 January 2023, as he moved up to super bantamweight.

=== Super bantamweight ===
==== Inoue vs. Fulton ====
On 18 January 2023, it was revealed that Inoue had entered into negotiations with the undefeated unified super bantamweight world champion Stephen Fulton. The fight was expected to take place at the Yokohama Arena in Yokohama, Japan, on 7 May 2023. The fight was postponed on 21 March, as Inoue suffered a fist injury during training camp. The bout was rescheduled for 25 July 2023, at the Ariake Arena in Tokyo, Japan.

Inoue won the fight by an eighth-round technical knockout. In the eighth round, he first knocked Fulton down with a left hook and forced referee Hector Afu to stop the contest with a flurry of unanswered punches soon thereafter. Inoue had out-landed his opponent 114 to 47 in total punches and 70 to 24 in power punches by that point.

==== Undisputed Super bantamweight champion ====
On 21 August 2023, it was reported that Inoue had entered into negotiations with two division champion and current unified WBA (Super) and IBF super bantamweight champion Marlon Tapales for an undisputed title bout. The fight was also for the lineal championship and took place at Ariake Arena in Tokyo, Japan on 26 December 2023.

Inoue won the fight by tenth-round knockout to become the first ever undisputed super bantamweight champion and a two-division undisputed champion, just a year after fully unifying the bantamweight division. Tapales was knocked down in the fourth round and again in the tenth, with the second knockdown rendering him unable to rise from the canvas in time to beat the count. This was Inoue's 19th recorded KO in 21 world title fights, bringing his KO rate to 90.4%, which is the highest KO rate in the history of world title matches.

==== Inoue vs. Nery ====
On 8 January 2024, it was reported that Inoue would make his first title defense as an undisputed champion against the WBC mandatory title challenger and former two division champion, Luis Nery. The bout was scheduled for 6 May 2024 at Tokyo Dome and was the first boxing match taking place at the venue since 1990.

Despite suffering the first knockdown of his professional career in the opening round, Inoue won the fight by a sixth-round knockout. He dropped Nery once in the second round and again in the fifth round, before a third and final knockdown in the sixth round ended the fight. Due to the significance of this bout, Inoue was awarded the honorary WBC Diamond belt. After this victory, Inoue was ranked as the number one pound for pound boxer for the second time in his career by The Ring. This fight set the record for the highest peak viewership in Japan's Amazon Prime Video history, surpassing the 2023 World Baseball Classic finals between Japan and the United States.

==== Inoue vs. Doheny ====
Inoue made the second defense of his undisputed super bantamweight title against former IBF super bantamweight champion TJ Doheny at Ariake Arena in Tokyo on 3 September 2024. Inoue retained his undisputed title by stopping Doheny with a body shot. During the seventh round, Inoue landed heavy body shots on Doheny, causing him to recoil from pain and limp away from Inoue. He then dropped to one knee, prompting referee Bence Kovacs to wave the fight off. The bout was officially stopped at 0:16 of the seventh round.

==== Inoue vs. Kim ====
On 3 October 2024, it was reported that Inoue would defend his undisputed super bantamweight title for the third time, against the undefeated IBF and WBO mandatory challenger Sam Goodman in Tokyo, Japan on 24 December 2024. On 13 December 2024, it was reported that Goodman suffered a serious cut on his eyelid during sparring and the fight has been moved to 24 January 2025. On 10 January 2025 it was reported that Goodman withdrew from the bout due to "recurrence of his eye injury". He was replaced by #11 ranked WBO, Kim Ye-joon. Inoue won the fight by fourth-round knockout.

In February 2025, it was reported that Inoue would face WBC No. 1 ranked contender David Picasso on 14 June 2025 at T-Mobile Arena in Las Vegas. In late February, it was reported that Picasso withdrew from the fight.

==== Inoue vs. Cardenas ====
Inoue made his fourth defense of his undisputed super bantamweight title against WBA No.1 ranked contender Ramon Cardenas at T-Mobile Arena in Las Vegas on 4 May 2025. Despite a knockdown in the second round, Inoue would score his own knockdown in the seventh and secure an eighth-round stoppage. At the time of the stoppage, he was ahead on all three judges’ scorecards, having won every round except the second. With this win, he set a new world record with 23 knockout victories in world title fights, surpassing the previous record of 22 held by former heavyweight champion Joe Louis.

==== Inoue vs. Akhmadaliev ====
On 1 May 2025, it was reported that Inoue would make the fifth defense of his undisputed super bantamweight title against former unified super-bantamweight champion Murodjon Akhmadaliev on 14 September 2025 in Tokyo, Japan. The fight was formally announced in July by Ohashi Promotions, to take place at the newly opened IG Arena in Nagoya, Japan, where it would stream live on Lemino. Inoue dominated the fight, retaining his undisputed super bantamweight titles via a wide unanimous decision. Moment the bell rang, Inoue's speed and superior footwork were clearly evident. He consistently outmanoeuvred Akhmadaliev, delivering precise jabs and powerful combinations, particularly targeting the body. Inoue's constant body work and swift counters allowed him to maintain control. As the fight progressed, Inoue continued to dominate through a strategic mix of jab work and intense body shots. The judges' scorecards read 117–111, 118–110, and 118–110 in favor of Inoue. According to CompuBox, Inoue landed 141 of 585 punches thrown (21.1%) and Akhmadaliev landed 62 of 376 thrown (16.5%).

==== Inoue vs. Picasso ====
In June 2025, Turki Alalshikh of Riyadh Season told Ring Magazine that he was planning a card to take place on 27 December 2025, with Inoue headlining against WBC mandatory challenger David Picasso. This would be Inoue's sixth title defense of his undisputed super bantamweight title. The card would be themed around Japanese boxers against Mexican/Mexican-American boxers. The card, titled The Ring V: Night of the Samurai, was announced on 18 September. Junto Nakatani, scheduled for the undercard, relinquished his WBC and IBF bantamweight titles in order to pursue a highly anticipated bout against Inoue, which was expected to occur next, contingent upon both fighters' succeeding on this card. Inoue defeated Picasso by unanimous decision. The judges scorecards read 120–108, 119–109 and 117–111 all for Inoue, who for the first time in his career won back-to-back fights via decision. According to CompuBox, Inoue landed 328 of 790 punches thrown (41.5%), which included 96 body shots. Picasso landed 170 of 485 (35.1%). The win was Inoue's fourth defence of his Ring magazine title in the same calendar year, matching a record previously set by Larry Holmes in 1983.

==== Inoue vs. Nakatani ====
In December 2025, the WBC reported that talks were already underway for Inoue to fight 27-year old Junto Nakatani (32–0, 24 KOs) in 2026, a fight that had been anticipated for over a year. This would be Inoue's seventh title defense of his undisputed super bantamweight title. Both boxers were scheduled on the same card on 27 December and won their respective fights. In early January 2026, it was reported the fight would take place on 2 May, at the Tokyo Dome in Japan. In his last fight, Nakatani moved up from bantamweight after unifying the WBC and IBF titles. The fight was announced on 23 February, with the undercard announced on 5 March. The card aired on Lemino PPV. During fight week, Ohashi Promotions announced that all tickets were sold out. Inoue would go on to win the fight via unanimous decision, with the judges scoring the bout 116–112, 115–113, 116–112. The fight reportedly sold over 1 million PPV buys on Lemino. It also generated $32 million from ticket sales. The fight took place in front of a sell-out crowd of 55,000 fans, with additional money earned from sponsorships and advertising. The gate was ranked the 4th highest in boxing history. It was also reported after that during the fight, Nakatani fractured his left eye socket via an uppercut by Inoue in the 11th round of the fight.

==== Next fight ====
On 20 April, prior to his fight against Nakatani, talks were already underway for a potential fight between Inoue and fellow pound-for-pound star and unified super flyweight champion Jesse “Bam” Rodriguez. Promoter Eddie Hearn confirmed early discussions had taken place, with the fight being described as “inevitable.” It was unlikely to occur in 2026, as Rodriguez is scheduled to fight Antonio Vargas in June. Rodriguez admitted if the fight was offered to him next, he would take it. On 2 May, Turki Al-Sheikh stated the fight was being planned for January 2027 in Japan, looking to break the Japanese attendance record.

After the Nakatani fight, his father and trainer, Shingo, believed Inoue should retire while he was still at his peak, as he had nothing left to prove. He said, “It’s enough already… he can walk away cleanly while he’s still great.” Despite this, Inoue was not considering retirement and was looking at a possible move up to featherweight. In June, Inoue's promoter Hideyuki Ohashi indicated that Inoue was being lined up for a major fight in February 2027, strongly suggesting that the opponent would be Rodriguez. The comments came after Inoue's victory over Junto Nakatani and Rodriguez's win over Antonio Vargas, although Rodriguez's camp suggested that he might take another interim bout before moving up again.

== Personal life ==
Naoya Inoue is married to his high school sweetheart and has three children. He is trained by his father Shingo Inoue, who is a former amateur boxer. He has one younger brother, Takuma Inoue, and one older cousin, Koki Inoue, both of whom are professional boxers.

== Outside the ring ==
=== Mizuno Wave Monster ===
On January 27, 2026, Inoue released his signature shoe, the "Mizuno Wave Monster." The shoe was developed over three years in collaboration between Inoue and Mizuno, with Inoue personally contributing to its design.

=== Endorsement deals ===
- Mizuno
- Riyadh Season
- NTT Plala
- Hikari TV
- Hublot
- Hosoyamada Trading Corporation
- MTG
- NTT Docomo
- Lemino
- D Card Platinum
- Earth Corporation
- Maruhan Corporation
- Meiji Group
- Aidma Holdings
- SBI Holdings
- TBC Group

=== Advertisement ===
- Gunze “BODY WILD” (from January 2019)
- Asahi Soft Drinks “Wilkinson” (from April 8, 2021, “Boxer” edition, “No.1 Only One” edition)
- TBC Group “MEN'S TBC” (from May 14, 2021)
- MTG “SIXPAD” (from June 20, 2021)
- Earth Corporation “Gokijet Pro” (from May 31, 2022)

=== Books ===
- Live Straight (Published by Fusosha, April 2014)
- The Monster (Published by KADOKAWA, March 2018)
- Winning Switch (Published by Shuwa System, November 2019)
- Fighting Naoya Inoue: The Day I Met the Monster (Published by Kodansha, October 2023)
- NAOYA INOUE DOCUMENTARY PHOTO BOOK 2018－2023 (Published by Shueisha, February 2024)

== Professional boxing record ==
33 fights	33 wins	0 losses
By knockout	27	0
By decision	6	0

No.	Result	Record	Opponent	Type	Round, time	Date	Location	Notes
33	Win	33–0	Junto Nakatani	UD	12	2 May 2026	Tokyo Dome, Tokyo, Japan	Retained WBA (Super), WBC, IBF, WBO, and The Ring super bantamweight titles
32	Win	32–0	David Picasso	UD	12	27 Dec 2025	Mohammed Abdo Arena, Riyadh, Saudi Arabia	Retained WBA (Super), WBC, IBF, WBO, and The Ring super bantamweight titles
31	Win	31–0	Murodjon Akhmadaliev	UD	12	14 Sep 2025	IG Arena, Nagoya, Japan	Retained WBA (Super), WBC, IBF, WBO, and The Ring super bantamweight titles
30	Win	30–0	Ramon Cardenas	TKO	8 (12), 0:45	4 May 2025	T-Mobile Arena, Paradise, Nevada, U.S.	Retained WBA (Super), WBC, IBF, WBO, and The Ring super bantamweight titles
29	Win	29–0	Kim Ye-joon	KO	4 (12), 2:25	24 Jan 2025	Ariake Arena, Tokyo, Japan	Retained WBA (Super), WBC, IBF, WBO, and The Ring super bantamweight titles
28	Win	28–0	TJ Doheny	TKO	7 (12), 0:16	3 Sep 2024	Ariake Arena, Tokyo, Japan	Retained WBA (Super), WBC, IBF, WBO, and The Ring super bantamweight titles
27	Win	27–0	Luis Nery	KO	6 (12), 1:39	6 May 2024	Tokyo Dome, Tokyo, Japan	Retained WBA (Super), WBC, IBF, WBO, and The Ring super bantamweight titles
26	Win	26–0	Marlon Tapales	KO	10 (12), 1:02	26 Dec 2023	Ariake Arena, Tokyo, Japan	Retained WBC and WBO super bantamweight titles; Won WBA (Super), IBF, and vacant The Ring super bantamweight titles
25	Win	25–0	Stephen Fulton	TKO	8 (12), 1:14	25 Jul 2023	Ariake Arena, Tokyo, Japan	Won WBC and WBO super bantamweight titles
24	Win	24–0	Paul Butler	KO	11 (12), 1:09	13 Dec 2022	Ariake Arena, Tokyo, Japan	Retained WBA (Super), WBC, IBF, and The Ring bantamweight titles; Won WBO bantamweight title
23	Win	23–0	Nonito Donaire	TKO	2 (12), 1:24	7 Jun 2022	Super Arena, Saitama, Japan	Retained WBA (Super), IBF, and The Ring bantamweight titles; Won WBC bantamweight title
22	Win	22–0	Aran Dipaen	TKO	8 (12), 2:34	14 Dec 2021	Ryōgoku Kokugikan, Tokyo, Japan	Retained WBA (Super), IBF, and The Ring bantamweight titles
21	Win	21–0	Michael Dasmariñas	KO	3 (12), 2:45	19 Jun 2021	Virgin Hotels Las Vegas, Paradise, Nevada, U.S.	Retained WBA (Super), IBF, and The Ring bantamweight titles
20	Win	20–0	Jason Moloney	KO	7 (12), 2:59	31 Oct 2020	MGM Grand Conference Center, Paradise, Nevada, U.S.	Retained WBA (Super), IBF, and The Ring bantamweight titles
19	Win	19–0	Nonito Donaire	UD	12	7 Nov 2019	Super Arena, Saitama, Japan	Retained IBF and The Ring bantamweight titles; Won WBA (Super) bantamweight title; World Boxing Super Series: bantamweight final
18	Win	18–0	Emmanuel Rodríguez	KO	2 (12), 1:20	18 May 2019	SSE Hydro, Glasgow, Scotland	Retained WBA (Unified) bantamweight title; Won IBF and vacant The Ring bantamweight titles; World Boxing Super Series: bantamweight semi-final
17	Win	17–0	Juan Carlos Payano	KO	1 (12), 1:10	7 Oct 2018	Yokohama Arena, Yokohama, Kanagawa, Japan	Retained WBA (Regular) bantamweight title; World Boxing Super Series: bantamweight quarter-final
16	Win	16–0	Jamie McDonnell	KO	1 (12), 1:52	25 May 2018	Ota City General Gymnasium, Tokyo, Japan	Won WBA (Regular) bantamweight title
15	Win	15–0	Yoan Boyeaux	KO	3 (12), 1:40	30 Dec 2017	Cultural Gymnasium, Yokohama, Kanagawa, Japan	Retained WBO junior bantamweight title
14	Win	14–0	Antonio Nieves	RTD	6 (12), 3:00	9 Sep 2017	Dignity Health Sports Park, Carson, California, U.S.	Retained WBO junior bantamweight title
13	Win	13–0	Ricardo Rodriguez	KO	3 (12), 1:08	21 May 2017	Ariake Coliseum, Tokyo, Japan	Retained WBO junior bantamweight title
12	Win	12–0	Kohei Kono	KO	6 (12), 1:01	30 Dec 2016	Ariake Coliseum, Tokyo, Japan	Retained WBO junior bantamweight title
11	Win	11–0	Petchbarngborn Kokietgym	KO	10 (12), 3:03	4 Sep 2016	Sky Arena, Zama, Kanagawa, Japan	Retained WBO junior bantamweight title
10	Win	10–0	David Carmona	UD	12	8 May 2016	Ariake Coliseum, Tokyo, Japan	Retained WBO junior bantamweight title
9	Win	9–0	Warlito Parrenas	KO	2 (12), 1:20	29 Dec 2015	Ariake Coliseum, Tokyo, Japan	Retained WBO junior bantamweight title
8	Win	8–0	Omar Narváez	KO	2 (12), 3:01	30 Dec 2014	Metropolitan Gymnasium, Tokyo, Japan	Won WBO junior bantamweight title
7	Win	7–0	Samartlek Kokietgym	TKO	11 (12), 1:08	5 Sep 2014	Yoyogi National Gymnasium, Tokyo, Japan	Retained WBC light flyweight title
6	Win	6–0	Adrián Hernández	KO	6 (12), 2:54	6 Apr 2014	Ota City General Gymnasium, Tokyo, Japan	Won WBC light flyweight title
5	Win	5–0	Jerson Mancio	TKO	5 (12), 2:51	6 Dec 2013	Ryōgoku Kokugikan, Tokyo, Japan	Won vacant OPBF light flyweight title
4	Win	4–0	Ryoichi Taguchi	UD	10	25 Aug 2013	Sky Arena, Zama, Kanagawa, Japan	Won Japanese light flyweight title
3	Win	3–0	Yūki Sano	TKO	10 (10), 1:09	16 Apr 2013	Korakuen Hall, Tokyo, Japan	
2	Win	2–0	Ngaoprajan Chuwatana	KO	1 (8), 1:50	5 Jan 2013	Korakuen Hall, Tokyo, Japan	
1	Win	1–0	Crison Omayao	KO	4 (8), 2:04	2 Oct 2012	Korakuen Hall, Tokyo, Japan	

== Exhibition boxing record ==
6 fights	0 wins	0 losses
Non-scored	6	

No.	Result	Record	Opponent	Type	Round, time	Date	Location	Notes
6	—N/a	0–0 (6)	Daigo Higa	—N/a	3	11 Feb 2021	Yoyogi National Gymnasium, Tokyo, Japan	Non-scored bout
5	—N/a	0–0 (5)	Genesis Servania	—N/a	3	19 Aug 2018	Sangyo Hall, Kanazawa, Japan	Non-scored bout
4	—N/a	0–0 (4)	Genesis Servania	—N/a	3	3 Jul 2016	Happiring, Fukui, Japan	Non-scored bout
3	—N/a	0–0 (3)	Akira Yaegashi	—N/a	2	19 May 2014	Korakuen Hall, Tokyo, Japan	Non-scored bout
2	—N/a	0–0 (2)	Akira Yaegashi	—N/a	2	21 Oct 2013	Korakuen Hall, Tokyo, Japan	Non-scored bout
1	—N/a	0–0 (1)	Masayuki Kuroda	—N/a	2	10 Jul 2012	Korakuen Hall, Tokyo, Japan	Non-scored bout

== Titles in boxing ==
=== Major world titles ===
- WBC light flyweight champion (108 lbs)
- WBO junior bantamweight champion (115 lbs)
- WBA (Super) bantamweight champion (118 lbs)
- WBC bantamweight champion (118 lbs)
- IBF bantamweight champion (118 lbs)
- WBO bantamweight champion (118 lbs)
- WBA (Super) super bantamweight champion (122 lbs)
- WBC super bantamweight champion (122 lbs)
- IBF super bantamweight champion (122 lbs)
- WBO super bantamweight champion (122 lbs)

=== Secondary major world titles (Note: The secondary champion lineage lists the Regular or Unified champions while the primary champion is occupied.) ===
- WBA (Regular) bantamweight champion (118 lbs)
- WBA (Unified) bantamweight champion (118 lbs)

=== The Ring magazine titles ===
- The Ring bantamweight champion (118 lbs)
- The Ring super bantamweight champion (122 lbs)

=== Regional/International titles ===
- Japanese light flyweight champion (108 lbs)
- OPBF light flyweight champion (108 lbs)

=== Undisputed titles ===
- Undisputed bantamweight champion
- Undisputed super bantamweight champion (Note: The first ever undisputed super bantamweight champion.)

=== Honorary titles ===
- WBC Diamond bantamweight champion
- WBC Diamond super bantamweight champion
- WBO Super Champion
- WBC Gray in May champion

== Pay-per-view bouts ==
Japan
No.	Date	Fight	Buys	Network
1	December 14, 2021	Inoue vs. Dipaen	—N/a	Hikari TV/Abema
2	December 27, 2025	Inoue vs. Picasso	—N/a	Lemino
3	May 2, 2026	Inoue vs. Nakatani	1,000,000	Lemino

United States
Date	Fight	Buys	Network
December 27, 2025	Inoue vs. Picasso	—N/a	DAZN

== Awards ==
- The Ring magazine Fighter of the Year: 2023
- The Ring magazine Fight of the Year: 2019
- The Ring magazine Knockout of the Year: 2018
- Sugar Ray Robinson Award: 2023
- BWAA Ali-Frazier Award: 2019
- Muhammad Ali Trophy: 2019
- WBC Fighter of the Year: 2022, 2023, 2025
- WBA Knockout of the Year: 2018
- IBF Fight of the Year: 2019
- IBF Fighter of the Year: 2025
- WBO Outstanding Achievement as a Boxer: 2019
- ESPN Fighter of the Year: 2023
- ESPN Fight of the Year: 2019
- CBS Sports Fight of the Year: 2019
- CBS Sports Fighter of the Year: 2023
- Top Rank Fighter of the Year: 2022, 2023
- Top Rank Knockout of the Year: 2022
- Metro Fighter of the Year: 2023
- WBN Young Fighter of the Year: 2014
- WBN Stoppage of the Year: 2018
- WBN Fight of the Year: 2019
- WBN Fighter of the Year: 2023, 2025
- Yahoo Sports Fight of the Year: 2019
- FanSided Fight of the Year: 2019
- The Sweet Science (TSS) Fighter of the Year: 2023, 2025 (Note: Shared with Terence Crawford.)
- Boxing Insider Fighter of the Year: 2022
- Boxing Insider Knockout of the Year: 2018
- BoxingScene Fighter of the Year: 2014, 2023
- Japan Boxing Commission Fighter of the Year: 2014, 2018, 2019, 2020, 2021, 2022, 2023, 2024, 2025
- Japan Boxing Commission Fight of the Year: 2014, 2019, 2023, 2024, 2025
- Japan Boxing Commission Knockout of the Year: 2014, 2015, 2018, 2020, 2021, 2022, 2023

== Filmography ==
=== Television and film ===
Year	Title	Role	Ref.
1 episode, 2019	VS Arashi	Himself	
2019	70th NHK Kōhaku Uta Gassen	Himself (judge)	
2024	The Fight Life - Naoya Inoue: The Perfect Fighter	Himself	

== See also ==
- Boxing in Japan
- Notable boxing families
- List of Japanese boxing world champions
- List of world light-flyweight boxing champions
- List of world super-flyweight boxing champions
- List of world bantamweight boxing champions
- List of world super-bantamweight boxing champions
- List of boxing quadruple champions

== Notes ==
Sporting positions
Regional boxing titles
Preceded by Ryoichi Taguchi	Japanese light flyweight champion 25 August 2013 – 18 October 2013; Vacated	Vacant Title next held by Yu Kimura
Vacant Title last held by Shin Ono	OPBF light flyweight champion 6 December 2013 – 28 February 2014; Vacated	Vacant Title next held by Jonathan Taconing
World boxing titles
Preceded by Adrián Hernández	WBC light flyweight champion 6 April 2014 – 3 November 2014; Vacated	Vacant Title next held by Pedro Guevara
Preceded by Omar Narváez	WBO junior bantamweight champion 30 December 2014 – 6 March 2018; Vacated	Vacant Title next held by Donnie Nietes
Preceded by Jamie McDonnell	WBA bantamweight champion Regular title 25 May 2018 – 18 May 2019; Status changed	Succeeded by Himself as Unified champion
Preceded by Himself as Regular champion	WBA bantamweight champion Unified title 18 May 2019 – 7 November 2019; Won Super title	Vacant Title next held by Guillermo Rigondeaux as Regular champion
Preceded by Emmanuel Rodríguez	IBF bantamweight champion 18 May 2019 – 13 January 2023; Vacated	Vacant Title next held by Emmanuel Rodríguez
Vacant Title last held by Shinsuke Yamanaka	The Ring bantamweight champion 18 May 2019 – 13 January 2023; Vacated	Vacant Title next held by Junto Nakatani
Preceded by Nonito Donaire	WBA bantamweight champion Super title 7 November 2019 – 13 January 2023; Vacated	Vacant Title next held by Takuma Inoue as Champion
Preceded by Nonito Donaire	WBC bantamweight champion 7 June 2022 – 13 January 2023; Vacated	Vacant Title next held by Alexandro Santiago
Preceded by Paul Butler	WBO bantamweight champion 13 December 2022 – 13 January 2023; Vacated	Vacant Title next held by Jason Moloney
Vacant Title last held by Enrique Pinder	Undisputed bantamweight champion 13 December 2022 – 13 January 2023; Titles fragmented	Vacant
Preceded by Stephen Fulton	WBC super bantamweight champion 25 July 2023 – present	Incumbent
Preceded by Stephen Fulton	WBO super bantamweight champion 25 July 2023 – present	Incumbent
Preceded by Marlon Tapales	WBA super bantamweight champion Super title 26 December 2023 – present	Incumbent
Preceded by Marlon Tapales	IBF super bantamweight champion 26 December 2023 – present	Incumbent
Vacant Title last held by Guillermo Rigondeaux	The Ring super bantamweight champion 26 December 2023 – present	Incumbent
Inaugural champion	Undisputed super bantamweight champion 26 December 2023 – present	Incumbent
Awards		Incumbent
Preceded by David Lemieux	The Ring magazine Knockout of the Year; 2018	Succeeded by Deontay Wilder
Preceded by Canelo Álvarez vs. Gennady Golovkin	The Ring magazine Fight of the Year vs. Nonito Donaire; 2019	Succeeded by Jose Zepeda vs. Ivan Baranchyk
Preceded by Jarrett Hurd vs. Erislandy Lara	BWAA Fight of the Year vs. Nonito Donaire; 2019	Succeeded by Jose Zepeda vs. Ivan Baranchyk
Preceded by Dmitry Bivol	The Ring magazine Fighter of the Year; 2023	Succeeded by Oleksandr Usyk
Preceded by Dmitry Bivol	BWAA Fighter of the Year; 2023	Succeeded by Oleksandr Usyk
Achievements
Preceded by Oleksandr Usyk	The Ring pound for pound No. 1 boxer 11 June – 20 August 2022	Succeeded by Oleksandr Usyk
Preceded by Terence Crawford	The Ring pound for pound No. 1 boxer 6 – 18 May 2024	Succeeded by Oleksandr Usyk
Preceded by Oleksandr Usyk	The Ring pound for pound No. 1 boxer 4 May 2026 – present	Incumbent
