= Ariake Arena =

Multi-sport venue in Tokyo, Japan

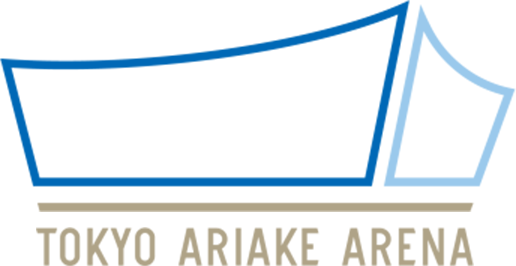

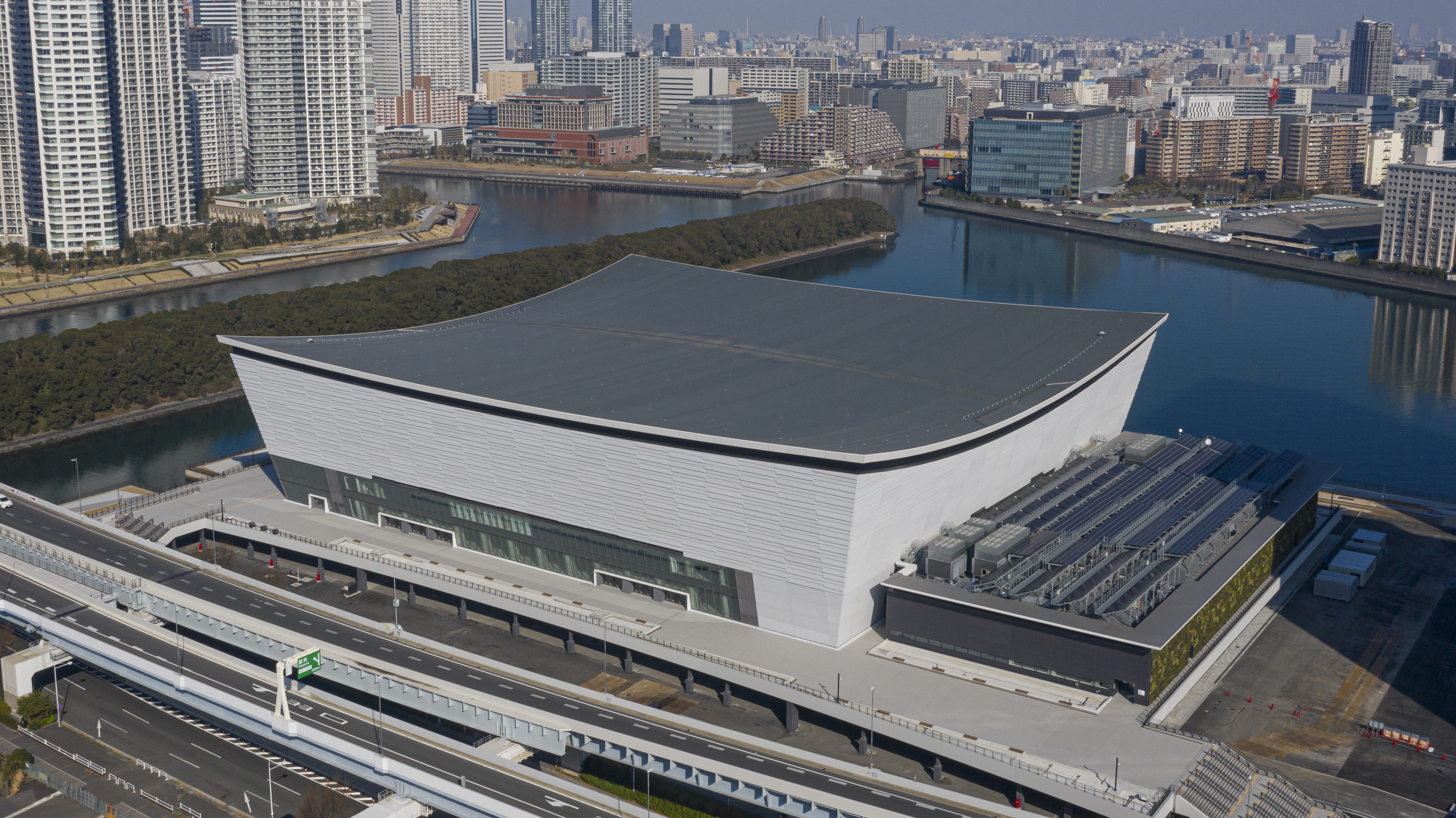
- Interactive map of Ariake Arena
- Location: Ariake 1-chōme, Kōtō-ku, Tokyo, Japan
- Coordinates: 35.6435°N 139.7943°E
- Owner: Tokyo Metropolitan Government
- Operator: Tokyo Organising Committee of the Olympic and Paralympic Games and Tokyo Metropolitan Government (until 2021); Tokyo Ariake Arena Inc (from 2022) (Note: The consortium includes Dentsu, NTT Docomo, Nippon Kanzai, Amuse, Live Nation Japan, Dentsu Live, Asics Japan, NTT Facilities, Xross Sports Marketing and Mitsubishi Research Institute)
- Capacity: 15,000 (12,000 fixed seats)

Construction
- Opened: 3 February 2020; 6 years ago
- Cost: ¥35 billion EUR € 215 million
- General contractor: Takenaka Corporation

Website
- ariake-arena.tokyo

The Ariake Arena (有明アリーナ, Ariake Arīna) is a multi-sport venue in Ariake, Kōtō, Tokyo, Japan. It served as the volleyball venue for the 2020 Summer Olympics and the wheelchair basketball knockout stage at the 2020 Summer Paralympics. This was the replacement of the Differ Ariake which was closed and demolished in June 2018.

== History ==
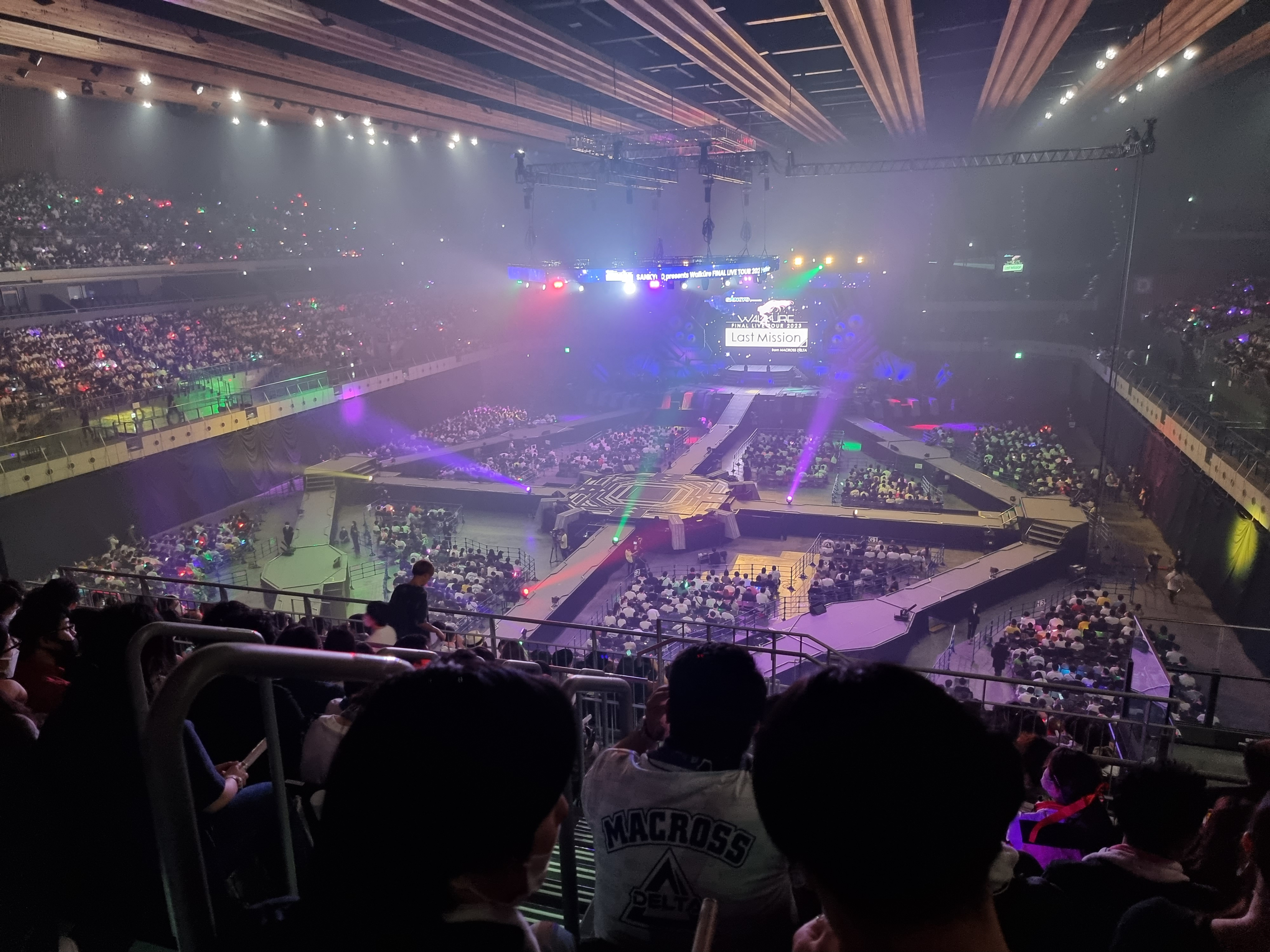
The interior of Ariake Arena

The Ariake Arena was one of the six permanent facilities designed to be built in the district of Ariake in order to host the Olympic and Paralympic Games. Its construction began in January 2017 and was completed in December 2019. The total cost of the project was around 35 billion yen (about US$320 million) and it has the capacity 12,000 spectators, which can be expanded to a max capacity of 15,000 with temporary seating.

After the Olympic and Paralympic Games, a consortium let by Dentsu was granted an exclusive right to operate the facility until March 2046. Under a concession agreement, the Metropolitan Government receives a fixed amount of 9.4 billion yen (376 million yen per year) and a profit share payment (50% of pretax profit each year) from the consortium.

== Events ==
The arena is used for both sporting events and concerts.

In 20 August 2022 the arena opened as a public facility with a Perfume concert as part of their Plasma Tour. Billie Eilish performed in the arena for her Happier Than Ever, The World Tour on 26 August 2022. The arena was used for the first time for sports with the B3 League game between Tokyo United v. Saitama Broncos, on 9 October 2022. Charli XCX performed in Ariake Arena on her Crash: The Live Tour during the Tonal Tokyo Festival on 29 October 2022.

The Japanese pro wrestling companies New Japan Pro-Wrestling (NJPW) and World Wonder Ring Stardom (Stardom) held the first ever Historic X-Over on 20 November 2022, the first pro wrestling event ever held at the venue. On 13 December 2022, Naoya Inoue won the bantamweight undisputed championship at the Ariake Arena.

The Last Rockstars performed in Ariake Arena on their debut tour on 26 and 27 January 2023. They performed again at the arena on 21, 22, and 23 November 2023. Harry Styles performed at the arena on 24 and 25 March 2023 as part of his Love On Tour. Usada Pekora held her first solo live concert at the venue on 6 December 2023. On 26 December 2023, Naoya Inoue won the super bantamweight undisputed championship at Ariake Arena.

ONE Championship's ONE 165 event took place on 28 January 2024. Naoya Inoue vs. TJ Doheny event took place on 3 September 2024. Kylie Minogue performed on 12 March 2025 as part of her Tension Tour, performing her number one song in Japan "Turn It into Love". Taeyeon performed at the arena on 19 and 20 April 2025 as part of her The Tense tour. The Idolmaster Cinderella Girls held a two day concert at the arena on 26 and 27 April 2025 as part of The Idolmaster Cinderella Girls: Starlight Stage 10th anniversary tour, Let's Amusement!!!, featuring performances from voice actresses of Cinderella Girls idols, such as Ricca Tachibana, Saya Aizawa, Satomi Amano, Yuka Ohtsubo, Natsumi Takamori, Ayaka Asai, Haruka Terui Maaya Uchida, Eriko Matsui, Tomo Muranaka, Karin Takahashi, Sumire Uesaka, Miharu Hanai, Haruka Yoshimura, Satsumi Matsuda, Hina Tachibana, Hana Tamegai, and more voice actresses.

== See also ==
- List of indoor arenas in Japan
