= Sam Goodman (boxer) =

Australian boxer (born 1998)

Personal information
- Nicknames: Sammy; The Ghost
- Born: Sam Goodman; October 10, 1998 (age 28) Albion Park, New South Wales, Australia
- Height: 5 ft 6 1/2 in (169 cm)
- Weight: Super bantamweight; Featherweight; Super featherweight

Boxing career
- Reach: 66 1/2 in (169 cm)
- Stance: Orthodox

Boxing record
- Total fights: 24
- Wins: 23
- Win by KO: 8
- Losses: 1

Sam Goodman (born 10 October 1998) is an Australian professional boxer. He has held the IBF interim super bantamweight title since September 2026. He challenged once for the WBA featherweight title in August 2025.

== Early life ==
Hailing from Albion Park, New South Wales, Australia, Goodman was born on 10 October 1998. At the age of 10 years old, Goodman injured his arm while playing rugby league. His father, a former rugby player, advised Sam to try boxing. He has listed Mike Tyson and Roy Jones Jr. as his early boxing heroes, however, that would change as he got older, and he became more fond of Vasiliy Lomachenko and Oleksandr Usyk.

== Amateur career ==
Goodman started his amateur career after his father suggested to go to the local PCYC Sutherland Club, he didn't thrive immediately, even admitting that he used to cry at every loss, but it didn't take him long to catch up, he also fought every week since he started amateur boxing, at the age of 12, Goodman won his first National title and took part in 100 fights in the unpaid ranks, he would peak in amateur career in 2017 world championships which he prevailed at, however he always preferred longer fights; "proper battles" as he called them, which is one reason he went professional in 2018. Goodman also wanted to represent Australia in the 2020 Summer Olympics, but it wasn't meant to be. As per BoxRec, Goodman won the Australian National Championships at "Schoolboy" age on 2012, he participated in the 2013 and 2014 National Championships Junior but would fall short at the semi-finals, on 2015 he participated in the Youth National Championships but would fail again at the semi-finals but would win a bronze medal in the 2016 version, he won the Association Internationale de Boxe Amateur (AIBA) 2016 world championships and the 2017 Oceanian championships.

== Professional career ==
=== Early career ===
==== Debut ====
Goodman stood at the super-bantamweight division and made his debut match against Thai veteran, Worawatchai Boonjan on 13 April 2018, by that time, Thai had composed a record of 11–12–1, which would be a challenge for a debutant, Goodman won via 2nd round technical knockout.

On 16 June 2021, Goodman successfully stopped Regional challenger Nort Beauchamp for the Australian Featherweight title, he would have a new record of nine wins, no losses and five knockouts, with wins against veterans and fellow newcomer boxers, and one of those victory is against olympian Simplice Fotsala.

=== Rise up the ranks ===
==== Goodman vs. Mepranum ====
On 22 December 2021, a match between Goodman and three-time world challenger Richie Mepranum for the vacant WBO Oriental super bantamweight title took place at The Star, Sydney. Goodman won via 6th round stoppage after Mepranum received an arm injury, therefore, Goodman is the new WBO Oriental champion.

==== Goodman vs. Fuse ====
Goodman defended his WBO Oriental title against Japanese Fumiya Fuse for the vacant IBF Inter-continental super-bantamweight title, winning via unanimous decision.

==== Goodman vs. Elorde ====
By July 2022 Goodman would be set to face former world challenger Juan Miguel Elorde, to defend his WBO Oriental and IBF Inter-continental titles, Goodman won via eighth round stoppage in a commanding display.

==== Goodman vs. Doheny ====
After defeating Jason Cooper to defend his WBO Oriental belt, Goodman would now be facing his most challenging opponent, former IBF world champion Irish TJ Doheny for Goodman's WBO Oriental and IBF Inter-continental super-bantamweight titles where Goodman would win via unanimous decision.

==== Goodman vs. Aleem ====
Goodman fought former WBA Interim super-bantamweight champion Ra'eese Aleem in an IBF final eliminator match on 18 June 2023. He won via 12-round split decision.

==== Goodman vs. Flores ====
Goodman would win three more times against ranked fighters, first with experienced Miguel Flores, where Goodman won via unanimous decision, scoring 120–105 (x2) and 118–107 on the judges scorecards.

==== Goodman vs. Liu ====
Goodman's next opponent was against undefeated Chinese boxer Zhong Liu on 15 December 2023 at Sydney, Australia. He won in another lop-sided unanimous decision. This was Goodman's fourth fight of the year.

==== Goodman vs. Schleibs ====
On 13 March 2024 Goodman knocked out compatriot Mark Schleibs in the fourth round at Wollongong.

==== Goodman vs. Worawut ====
Goodman faced undefeated Chainoi Worawut on 10 July 2024 at Wollongong Entertainment Centre. Goodman prevailed in another wide-margin unanimous decision (119–109, 117–113 and 117–111) and fought through a left-hand injury sustained within the 6th round.

==== Cancelled bouts with Naoya Inoue ====
On 3 October 2024, it was reported that Goodman would challenge Naoya Inoue for the undisputed super bantamweight title in Tokyo, Japan, on 24 December 2024. On 13 December 2024, it was reported that Goodman suffered a serious cut on his eyelid during sparring and the fight has been moved to 24 January 2025. His fight with Inoue was cancelled for the second time after he had again injured his left eyelid during training on the morning of 11 January 2025. He was replaced by Kim Ye-joon.

==== Goodman vs. Vaca ====
Goodman defeated Cesar Vaca Espinoza by unanimous decision at Hordern Pavilion in Sydney, Australia, on 14 May 2025.

=== WBA featherweight championship challenge ===
==== Goodman vs. Ball ====
Goodman challenged English boxer Nick Ball, for his WBA featherweight title, on 16 August 2025 in Riyadh, Saudi Arabia. Goodman lost by unanimous decision.

==== Goodman vs. Blizzard ====
Goodman got back to winning ways in his next fight, defeating the previously unbeaten Tyler Blizzard via unanimous decision at TikTok Entertainment Centre in Sydney, Australia, on 17 December 2025.

==== Goodman vs. Ruiz ====
On 5 April 2026, Goodman defeated Rodrigo Fabian Ruiz by unanimous decision over 12 rounds in a final eliminator for a shot at the IBF junior-featherweight title at the Wollongong Entertainment Centre in Wollongong, Australia.

==== Goodman vs. Nishida ====
On 15 July 2026, Muto Promotions won a purse bid for an IBF interim 122-pound world title fight between Goodman and IBF #1 ranked contender, Ryosuke Nishida, and would host the fight in Japan on 27 September 2026. Goodman won the fight by unanimous decision.

== Professional boxing record ==
24 fights	23 wins	1 loss
By knockout	8	0
By decision	15	1

No.	Result	Record	Opponent	Type	Round, time	Date	Location	Notes
24	Win	23–1	Ryosuke Nishida	UD	12	27 Sep 2026	Toyota Arena, Tokyo, Japan	Won Interim IBF super bantamweight title
23	Win	22–1	Rodrigo Fabian Ruiz	UD	12	5 Apr 2026	Wollongong Entertainment Centre, Wollongong, Australia	
22	Win	21–1	Tyler Blizzard	UD	10	17 Dec 2025	TikTok Entertainment Centre, Sydney, Australia	
21	Loss	20–1	Nick Ball	UD	12	16 Aug 2025	anb Arena, Riyadh, Saudi Arabia	For WBA featherweight title
20	Win	20–0	Cesar Vaca Espinoza	UD	10	14 May 2025	Hordern Pavilion, Sydney, Australia	
19	Win	19–0	Chainoi Worawut	UD	12	10 Jul 2024	Wollongong Entertainment Centre, Wollongong, Australia	
18	Win	18–0	Mark Schleibs	TKO	4 (10), 1:45	13 Mar 2024	Wollongong Entertainment Centre, Wollongong, Australia	
17	Win	17–0	Zhong Liu	UD	12	15 Dec 2023	The Star, Sydney, Australia	
16	Win	16–0	Miguel Flores	UD	12	15 Oct 2023	Gold Coast Convention and Exhibition Centre, Broadbeach, Australia	
15	Win	15–0	Ra'eese Aleem	SD	12	18 Jun 2023	Gold Coast Convention and Exhibition Centre, Broadbeach, Australia	
14	Win	14–0	TJ Doheny	UD	10	12 Mar 2023	Sydney SuperDome, Sydney Olympic Park, Sydney, Australia	Retained IBF Inter-Continental and WBO Oriental super bantamweight titles
13	Win	13–0	Jason Cooper	UD	10	8 Oct 2022	Newcastle Entertainment Centre, Broadmeadow, Australia	Retained WBO Oriental super bantamweight title
12	Win	12–0	Juan Miguel Elorde	TKO	8 (10), 1:26	20 Jul 2022	Hordern Pavilion, Sydney Australia	Retained IBF Inter-Continental and WBO Oriental super bantamweight titles
11	Win	11–0	Fumiya Fuse	UD	10	11 May 2022	Newcastle Entertainment Centre, Broadmeadow, Australia	Retained WBO Oriental super bantamweight title; Won vacant IBF Inter-Continental super bantamweight title
10	Win	10–0	Richie Mepranum	TKO	6 (10), 0:48	22 Dec 2021	The Star, Sydney Australia	Won vacant WBO Oriental super bantamweight title
9	Win	9–0	Nort Beauchamp	TKO	6 (8), 1:17	16 Jun 2021	International Convention Centre, Sydney, Australia	Won vacant Australian featherweight title
8	Win	8–0	Daniel Carr	UD	6	10 Apr 2021	Gold Coast Convention and Exhibition Centre, Broadbeach, Australia	
7	Win	7–0	Noldi Manakane	TKO	1 (8), 2:45	7 Mar 2020	Fraternity Club, Fairy Meadow, Australia	
6	Win	6–0	Sunardi Gamboa	TKO	3 (6), 2:07	16 Nov 2019	Hordern Pavilion, Sydney Australia	
5	Win	5–0	Claudevan Sese	TKO	3 (6), 2:37	27 Jul 2019	Luna Park, Sydney, Australia	
4	Win	4–0	Simplice Fotsala	UD	6	29 Mar 2019	Fraternity Club, Fairy Meadow, Australia	
3	Win	3–0	Shamal Ram Anuj	UD	6	27 Oct 2018	Taren Point Bowling Club, Taren Point, Australia	
2	Win	2–0	Richard Lockett	UD	8	19 Aug 2018	K Ranch Arena, Mt Hunter, Australia	
1	Win	1–0	Worawatchai Boonjan	TKO	2 (4), 0:45	13 Apr 2018	Cronulla Sutherland Leagues Club, Cronulla, Australia	
