= Super bantamweight =

Boxing weight class

Super bantamweight, also known as junior featherweight, is a weight class in professional boxing, contested from 118 pounds (54 kg) and up to 122 pounds (55 kg).

There were attempts by boxing promoters in the 1920s to establish this weight class, but few sanctioning organizations or state athletic commissions would recognize it. Jack Wolf won recognition as champion when he beat Joe Lynch at Madison Square Garden on September 21, 1922, but afterwards, the weight division fell into disuse.

The division was revived in the 1970s, and the first title fight in 54 years in the division took place in 1976 when the World Boxing Council recognized Rigoberto Riasco as its champion after he defeated Waruinge Nakayama in eight rounds. The World Boxing Association crowned its first champion in 1977 when Soo Hwan Hong knocked out Hector Carasquilla in three rounds to win the inaugural WBA championship. In 1983, the International Boxing Federation sanctioned the bout between Bobby Berna and Seung-In Suh for its first title. Berna won in the eleventh round.

On December 26, 2023, Naoya Inoue became the division's first undisputed champion.

Notable fighters to hold championship titles at this weight have been Wilfredo Gómez, Lupe Pintor, Jeff Fenech, Daniel Zaragoza, Kennedy McKinney, Érik Morales, Naoya Inoue, Marco Antonio Barrera, Manny Pacquiao, Nonito Donaire, Rafael Márquez, Toshiaki Nishioka, and Israel Vázquez.

== Current world champions ==
Current champions

Sanctioning body	Reign began	Champion	Record	Defenses
WBA	December 26, 2023	Naoya Inoue	33–0 (27 KO)	7
WBC	July 25, 2023	Naoya Inoue	33–0 (27 KO)	8
IBF	December 26, 2023	Naoya Inoue	33–0 (27 KO)	7
WBO	July 25, 2023	Naoya Inoue	33–0 (27 KO)	8

== Current The Ring world rankings ==
As of May 2, 2026.

Keys:

C Current The Ring world champion

Rank	Name	Record	Title(s)
C	Naoya Inoue	33–0 (27 KO)	WBO, WBC, WBA, IBF
1	Murodjon Akhmadaliev	15–2 (12 KO)	
2	Sam Goodman	22–1 (9 KO)	
3	Junto Nakatani	32–1 (24 KO)	
4	Sebastian Hernandez	22–1 (19 KO)	
5	Ramon Cardenas	28–2 (15 KO)	
6	Ryosuke Nishida	11–1 (2 KO)	
7	David Picasso	33–1–1 (18 KO)	
8	Shabaz Masoud	15–0 (4 KO)	
9	Bryan Mercado Vazquez	32–2 (26 KO)	
10	Yukinori Oguni	21–5–3 (8 KO)	

== Lineal Champions ==
- (Panama) Rigoberto Riasco (1976)
- (Japan) Royal Kobayashi (1976)
- (South Korea) Dong-Kyun Yum (1976-1977)
- (Puerto Rico) Wilfredo Gomez (1977-1983) Vacated
- (United States) Paulie Ayala (2002-2003) Vacated
- (Mexico) Israel Vazquez (2005-2007)
- (Mexico) Rafael Márquez (2007)
- (Mexico) Israel Vázquez (2007-2009) Vacated (2)
- (Philippines) Nonito Donaire (2012-2013)
- (Cuba) Guillermo Rigondeaux (2013-2022) Abandoned
- (Japan) Naoya Inoue (2023-Present)
