= Pedro Guevara (boxer) =

Mexican boxer (born 1989)

Personal information
- Nickname: Jibran Pedrin
- Born: Pedro Gibrán Guevara Rocha; 7 June 1989 (age 37) Mazatlán, Sinaloa, Mexico
- Height: 5 ft 4 in (163 cm)
- Weight: Light flyweight; Super flyweight

Boxing career
- Reach: 67 in (170 cm)
- Stance: Orthodox

Boxing record
- Total fights: 51
- Wins: 43
- Win by KO: 22
- Losses: 5
- Draws: 2
- No contests: 1

Pedro Gibrán Guevara Rocha (born 7 June 1989) is a Mexican professional boxer. He is a former WBC light flyweight champion.

== Career ==
Guevara started boxing as a teenager at the UAS. He still trains there, under coaches Marcos and Radamés Hernández. He represented Sinaloa in national Mexican competitions, and claims a victory over Oscar Valdez as an amateur.

Guevara turned pro in March 2008, defeating Gabriel López with a round 2 TKO. Guevara defeated Karluis Diaz on his 14th professional bout, claiming the WBC Silver light flyweight title. Guevara drew with Mario Rodríguez on his next fight. He went on to claim the NABF title, defeating Jorle Estrada with a round 7 TKO.

In August 2012, Guevara challenged for a world title for the first time, facing IBF light flyweight champion John Riel Casimero on his native Mazatlán. A left hook from Casimero dropped Guevara early on in the first round, but Guevara rallied and took many of the subsequent rounds. Casimero took the last rounds through his superior defense. Casimero got a split decision win (116–111, 114–113, 113–114) to retain his title.

Guevara regained the WBC Silver title on his next fight, beating Raúl García by split decision. Guevara beat Mario Rodríguez, who he'd previously fought to a draw, with a shutout unanimous decision (120–108, 119–109, 118–110).

=== Guevara vs. Yaegashi ===
In December 2014, Guevara fought Akira Yaegashi for the vacant WBC light flyweight title in Tokyo. This was Guevara's first fight outside Mexico. The title was left vacant by Naoya Inoue, who moved up in weight. Yaegashi was moving down in weight, having lost his flyweight titles to Román González. The fight started with both boxers measuring each other, although Guevara seemed to edge the early rounds. Yaegashi started successfully trading shots in round 5. However, Guevara systematically broke Yaegashi down, who went down in round 7 after a left hook to the body. Yaegashi was unable to get up, giving Guevara the win and the WBC title.

=== Guevara vs. Claveras ===
Guevara won his first defense comfortably, stopping outmatched Richard Claveras in one round.

=== Guevara vs. Lopez ===
In July 2015, Guevara defended his title against mandatory challenger Ganigan López. The fight started as a slow, tactical affair, but Guevara pulled ahead with superior skills and more consistent work. López rallied in the championship rounds. Guevara hit the canvas in round 11 but it was ruled a slip. López's rally proved to not be enough as Guevara retained his title with a unanimous decision win (117–111, 116–112, 116–112).

=== Guevara vs. Kimura ===
In November 2015, Guevara's title reign came to a screeching halt, as Guevara dropped a split decision (113–115, 113–115, 117–111) to Yu Kimura. Guevara built an early lead, but he slowed down as the rounds went on due to Kimura's body shots.

=== Guevara vs. Shiro ===
Guevara pushed for a rematch against Kimura and a rematch against Ganigan López, who would unseat Kimura on 2016, but he wouldn't get another title shot until October 2017 against Ken Shiro, who had defeated López earlier that year. Guevara started strongly but as the fight went on, he once again started to slow down due to body shots, with Shiro rallying in the second half of the fight and winning a narrow majority decision (115–113, 115–113, 114-114). After the fight, Shiro called out Ganigan López.

=== Guevara vs. Teraji ===
On 22 October 2017, Kenshiro Teraji beat Pedro Guevara by majority decision in their 12-round contest for the WBC championship of the world. The scorecards were announced as 115–113, 114-114, 116–112 in favor of Teraji.

=== Guevara vs. Moloney ===
On 12 May 2024, in Perth, Australia, Guevara was scheduled to face Andrew Moloney for the vacant WBC junior bantamweight title. He won the fight by split decision.

=== Guevara vs. Rodriguez ===
Guevara was scheduled to challenge Jesse Rodriguez for WBC super flyweight title on 9 November 2024, in Philadelphia, Pennsylvania. Guevara lost the fight by TKO in the third round.

== Professional boxing record ==
51 fights	43 wins	5 losses
By knockout	22	1
By decision	21	4
Draws	2	
No contests	1	

No.	Result	Record	Opponent	Type	Round, time	Date	Location	Notes
51	NC	43–5–2 (1)	Tomoya Tsuboi	NC	2 (10), 0:23	11 April 2026	Korakuen Hall, Tokyo, Japan	
50	Draw	43–5–2	Alexis Molina Aguirre	SD	10	6 September 2025	Centro de Usos Multiples, Los Mochis, Sinaloa, Mexico	
49	Win	43–5–1	Jose Armando Valdes	UD	10	28 March 2025	Mazatlán, Mexico	
48	Loss	42–5–1	Jesse Rodriguez	TKO	3 (12), 2:47	9 November 2024	Wells Fargo Center, Philadelphia, Pennsylvania, U.S.	For WBC and The Ring super-flyweight titles
47	Win	42–4–1	Andrew Moloney	SD	12	12 May 2024	RAC Arena, Perth, Australia	Won vacant WBC Interim super-flyweight title
46	Win	41–4–1	Lamberto Macias	UD	10	17 February 2024	Mazatlán, Mexico	
45	Loss	40–4–1	Carlos Cuadras	SD	12	17 November 2023	Humo Arena, Tashkent, Uzbekistan	For vacant WBC Interim super-flyweight title
44	Win	40–3–1	Miguel Angel Herrera	UD	10	28 June 2023	Culiacán, Mexico	
43	Win	39–3–1	Angel Aviles Armenta	UD	10	17 September 2022	Toluca, Mexico	
42	Win	38–3–1	Marlon Rios Sarinana	UD	8 (8)	11 September 2021	Jardin Orquidea, Cuernavaca, Mexico	
41	Win	37–3–1	Samuel Gutierrez	TKO	3 (10), 1:10	10 July 2021	Polideportivo Solidaridad, Ciudad Acuña, Mexico	
40	Win	36–3–1	Victor Matute	TKO	4 (10), 1:37	15 November 2019	Palenque de la Expo, Ciudad Obregón, Mexico	
39	Win	35–3–1	Janiel Rivera	UD	12	20 July 2019	Mazatlán, Mexico	Retained WBC FECARBOX super-flyweight title
38	Win	34–3–1	Marvin Solano	KO	5 (12), 1:21	13 April 2019	Plaza de Toros Monumental, Cihuatlán, Mexico	Retained WBC FECARBOX super-flyweight title
37	Win	33–3–1	Jorge Guerrero Aguilar	PTS	8 (8)	8 December 2018	Domo Binacional, Heroica Nogales, Mexico	
36	Win	32–3–1	Roberto Sánchez	RTD	10 (12), 3:00	1 September 2018	Palenque de la Expo, Ciudad Obregón, Mexico	Won vacant WBC FECARBOX super-flyweight title
35	Win	31–3–1	Ángel Guevara	TKO	6 (10)	18 May 2018	Gimnasio German Evers, Mazatlán, Mexico	
34	Loss	30–3–1	Kenshiro Teraji	MD	12	22 October 2017	Ryōgoku Kokugikan, Tokyo, Japan	For WBC light-flyweight title
33	Win	30–2–1	Oswaldo Novoa	SD	8	13 May 2017	PALCCO, Zapopan, Mexico	
32	Win	29–2–1	Jerry Tomogdan	UD	10	15 October 2016	Centro de Usos Múltiples, Mazatlán, Mexico	
31	Win	28–2–1	Rubén Montoya	TD	6 (10)	2 July 2016	Arena Coliseo, Mexico City, Mexico	
30	Win	27–2–1	Jether Oliva	UD	10	20 February 2016	Lobodome, Mazatlán, Mexico	
29	Loss	26–2–1	Yu Kimura	SD	12	28 November 2015	Xebio Arena, Sendai, Japan	Lost WBC light-flyweight title
28	Win	26–1–1	Ganigan López	UD	12	4 July 2015	Centro de Usos Múltiples, Mazatlán, Mexico	Retained WBC light-flyweight title
27	Win	25–1–1	Richard Claveras	TKO	1 (12), 3:00	11 April 2015	Centro de Usos Múltiples, Mazatlán, Mexico	Retained WBC light-flyweight title
26	Win	24–1–1	Akira Yaegashi	KO	7 (12), 2:45	30 December 2014	Metropolitan Gym, Tokyo, Japan	Won vacant WBC light-flyweight title
25	Win	23–1–1	Alejandro Morales	TKO	6 (8)	20 September 2014	Estadio de Beisbol, Guamúchil, Mexico	
24	Win	22–1–1	Armando Torres	SD	8	31 May 2014	Agustín Melgar Olympic Velodrome, Mexico City, Mexico	
23	Win	21–1–1	Ivan Meneses	RTD	2 (10), 3:00	30 November 2013	Deportivo Agustín Ramos Millan, Toluca, Mexico	
22	Win	20–1–1	Mario Rodríguez	UD	12	20 July 2013	Domo de la Colosio, Playa del Carmen, Mexico	Retained WBC Silver light-flyweight title
21	Win	19–1–1	Raúl García	SD	12	30 March 2013	Estadio Francisco Carranza Limón, Guasave, Mexico	Won vacant WBC Silver light-flyweight title
20	Loss	18–1–1	John Riel Casimero	SD	12	4 August 2012	Centro de Convenciones, Mazatlán, Mexico	For IBF light-flyweight title
19	Win	18–0–1	Jose Guadalupe Martinez	UD	12	19 May 2012	Monumental Plaza de Toros, Tepic, Mexico	Retained NABF light-flyweight title
18	Win	17–0–1	Patricio Camacho	KO	2 (10), 1:40	14 April 2012	Auditorio Ernesto Rufo, Rosarito, Mexico	
17	Win	16–0–1	Manuel Jiménez	RTD	4 (12), 3:00	10 December 2011	Plaza de Toros Calafia, Mexicali, Mexico	Retained NABF light-flyweight title
16	Win	15–0–1	Jorle Estrada	TKO	7 (12), 2:17	22 October 2011	Auditorio Luis Estrada Medina, Guasave, Mexico	Won vacant NABF light-flyweight title
15	Draw	14–0–1	Mario Rodríguez	SD	12	28 May 2011	Centro de Convenciones, Mazatlán, Mexico	Retained WBC Silver light-flyweight title
14	Win	14–0	Karluis Diaz	KO	3 (12), 2:11	18 December 2010	Caliente Hipódromo, Tijuana, Mexico	Won vacant WBC Silver light-flyweight title
13	Win	13–0	Raul Garay Carreon	KO	1 (10), 2:08	13 November 2010	Expo Feria Canaco, Mazatlán, Mexico	
12	Win	12–0	German Aaron Cota	KO	3 (6), 2:02	14 August 2010	Auditorio Luis Estrada Medina, Guasave, Mexico	
11	Win	11–0	Charly Valenzuela	TKO	5 (10)	16 July 2010	Gimnasio German Evers, Mazatlán, Mexico	
10	Win	10–0	Doroteo Aguilera	TKO	5 (8), 0:44	4 June 2010	Gimnasio German Evers, Mazatlán, Mexico	
9	Win	9–0	Jesus Hernandez	UD	4	27 March 2010	Arena Monterrey, Monterrey, Mexico	
8	Win	8–0	German Aaron Cota	UD	8	5 February 2010	Gimnasio German Evers, Mazatlán, Mexico	
7	Win	7–0	Cesar Lopez	KO	1 (4)	21 November 2009	Gimnasio Niños Héroes, Tepic, Mexico	
6	Win	6–0	Pedro Gonzalez	TKO	3 (6)	10 October 2009	Arena Querétaro, Querétaro, Mexico	
5	Win	5–0	Noe Alvarez	TKO	2 (6), 1:19	11 July 2009	Calle Coahuila y 5 de Mayo Zona Norte, Tijuana, Mexico	
4	Win	4–0	Miguel Angel Hernandez	UD	6	13 June 2009	Auditorio Municipal, Tijuana, Mexico	
3	Win	3–0	Francisco Lopez	TKO	3 (4), 1:34	16 May 2009	Auditorio Municipal, Tijuana, Mexico	
2	Win	2–0	German Aaron Cota	UD	4	14 March 2009	Estadio Francisco Carranza Limón, Guasave, Mexico	
1	Win	1–0	Gabriel Lopez	TKO	2 (4), 0:58	15 March 2008	Fronton Eldorado, Eldorado, Mexico	

== Personal life ==
Pedro's brother, Alberto Guevara, is also a boxer who has previously challenged for a world title at bantamweight.

== See also ==
- List of male boxers
- Notable boxing families
- List of Mexican boxing world champions
- List of world light-flyweight boxing champions

Sporting positions
Regional boxing titles
New title	WBC Silver light-flyweight champion 18 December 2010 – 2011; Vacated	Vacant Title next held by Sammy Gutiérrez
Vacant Title last held by Adrián Hernández	NABF light-flyweight champion 22 October 2011 – 2013; Vacated	Vacant Title next held by Francisco Rodríguez Jr.
Vacant Title last held by Xiong Chaozhong	WBC Silver light-flyweight champion 30 March 2013 – 30 December 2014; Won world title	Vacant Title next held by Ricardo Pérez
Vacant Title last held by Carlos Narváez	WBC FECARBOX super-flyweight champion 1 September 2018 – 2021; Vacated	Vacant Title next held by Alejandro Espinoza Tinoco
World boxing titles
Vacant Title last held by Naoya Inoue	WBC light-flyweight champion 30 December 2014 – 28 November 2015	Succeeded by Yu Kimura
Vacant Title last held by Carlos Cuadras	WBC super-flyweight champion Interim title 12 May 2024 – 9 November 2024; Lost bid for full title	Vacant
