= ALA Promotions =

Philippine boxing promotion company

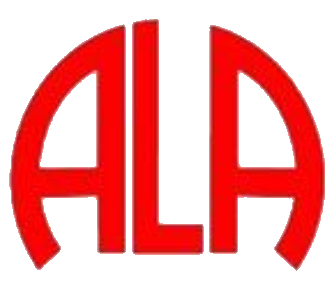
- Company type: Private
- Industry: Sports media
- Founded: 1985
- Founder: Antonio L. Aldeguer
- Defunct: 2020
- Headquarters: Cebu City, Philippines
- Key people: Michael Aldeguer (Chairman and CEO)
- Parent: ALA Boxing

ALA Promotions was a boxing promotions company based in Cebu, Philippines. It is known for promoting prominent Filipino boxers including world champions Donnie Nietes and Milan Melindo.

== History ==
ALA Boxing was established in 1985 in Cebu by businessman Antonio L. Aldeguer, whose initials "ALA" are the namesake of the sports firm. ALA Boxing through ALA Promotions first rose to prominence in the 1990s after they have organized boxing matches featuring Edito Villamor and Gerry Peñalosa.

In 2006, Michael Aldeguer took over as the chairman and CEO of ALA.

ALA partnered with Golden Boy Promotions to produce the Battle of Cebu in 2008, which featured the tie of Filipino boxer Z Gorres against Fernando Montiel of Mexico at the Cebu City Sports Complex, as well as matches between Filipino and Mexican boxes in Sacramento, California. ALA also had a partnership with Top Rank and has organized matches in the United Arab Emirates as well.

In the 2010s, ALA promoted ties between Filipino boxers including Donnie Nietes and Nonito Donaire, against foreign fighters in its Pinoy Pride series it produced with ABS-CBN Sports.

In 2020, ALA's broadcast partner ABS-CBN ceased operations due to the non-renewal of the media company's franchise. This along with the COVID-19 pandemic forced the permanent closure of ALA Promotions although its affiliate gymnasium chain business, ALA Gym remained operational.

== Notable boxers ==
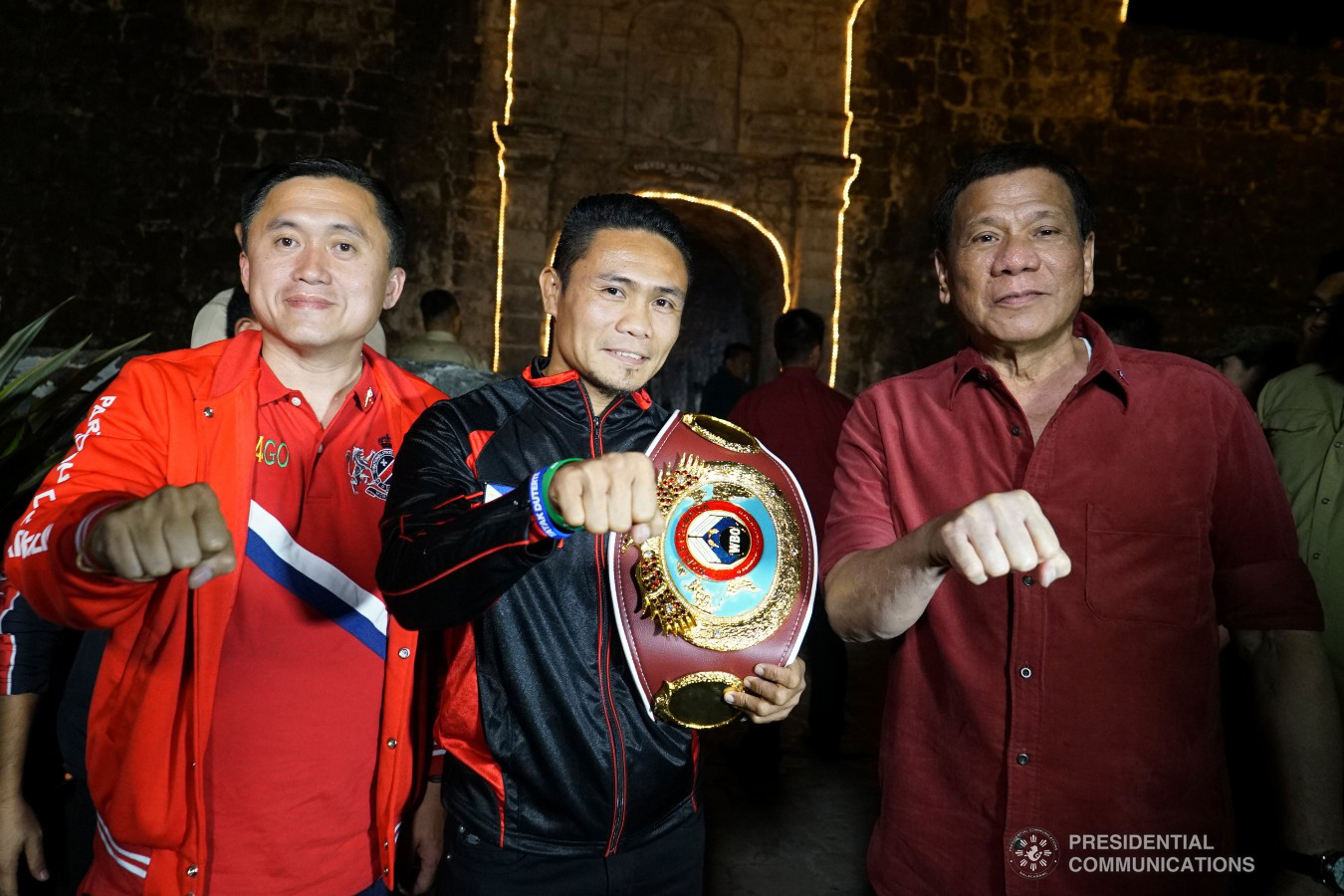
WBO junior-bantamweight champion Donnie Nietes (center) together with President Rodrigo Roa Duterte (right) and Christopher Lawrence "Bong" Go (left), during the campaign rally at the Plaza Independencia in Cebu City on February 24, 2019.

The following are some of the boxers who were affiliated with ALA Boxing:

- AJ Banal
- Rey Bautista
- Nonito Donaire
- Z Gorres
- Melvin Jerusalem
- Mark Magsayo
- Milan Melindo
- Donnie Nietes
- Albert Pagara
- Jason Pagara
- Gerry Peñalosa
- Merlito Sabillo
- Jeo Santisima
- Genesis Servania
- Jonas Sultan
- Arthur Villanueva

== See also ==
- MP Promotions
