= Francisco Rodríguez Jr. =

Mexican boxer (born 1993)

Personal information
- Nickname: Chihuas
- Born: José Francisco Rodríguez Tamayo; 10 July 1993 (age 32) Monterrey, Nuevo León, Mexico
- Height: 5 ft 4 in (163 cm)
- Weight: Mini flyweight; Light flyweight; Flyweight; Super flyweight

Boxing career
- Reach: 65 in (165 cm)
- Stance: Orthodox

Boxing record
- Total fights: 49
- Wins: 40
- Win by KO: 28
- Losses: 6
- Draws: 1
- No contests: 2

Jose Francisco Rodríguez Tamayo (born 10 July 1993) is a Mexican professional boxer who previously held the unified International Boxing Federation (IBF) and World Boxing Organization (WBO) mini-flyweight titles in 2014.

== Professional career ==
=== Unified mini flyweight champion ===
==== Rodríguez Jr. vs. Sabillo ====
His 16–2 record earned Rodríguez Jr. the right to challenge the undefeated WBO mini flyweight champion Merlito Sabillo in what was the Sabillo's third title defense. The title bout was scheduled as the main event of a card which took place at the Monterrey Arena in Monterrey, Mexico on 22 March 2014. He won the fight by a tenth-round technical knockout. Rodríguez Jr. knocked Sabillo down with a flurry of punches as early as the second round and continued to dominate from that point on. Sabillo's head trainer Edito Villamor opted to throw in the towel at the 1:50 minute of the tenth round, having deemed his fighter to have taken too much punishment.

==== Rodríguez Jr. vs. Takayama ====
Rodríguez Jr. faced the IBF mini flyweight champion Katsunari Takayama in a unification bout in his next professional appearance. The contest took place in the same venue as his previous title fight, the Monterrey Arena in Monterrey, Mexico, on 9 August 2014. It was broadcast by TV Azteca domestically and by beIN Sports in the United States. Rodríguez Jr. won the fight by unanimous decision, with scores of 119–108, 116–111 and 115–112. He scored the sole knockdown of the fight in the third round, flooring Takayama with a left hook. The fight was later named the "2014 Fight of the Year" by Bleacher Report, Boxing Scene, and ESPN.

Rodríguez Jr. vacated the IBF title on 1 October 2014 and the WBO title on 15 December 2014. His promoters claimed that he had vacated the title as was struggling to meet the 105-lbs mark, saying: "...basically, since he was struggling to make 105 pounds, he’s looking to make his mark at the higher weight now".

=== Light flyweight and flyweight ===
==== Rodríguez Jr. vs. Fajardo ====
After vacating his IBF title, but before vacating the WBO title as well, Rodríguez Jr. moved up to flyweight in order to face the unheralded Jomar Fajardo. The bout was scheduled for the undercard of "Pinoy Pride 28", which was headlined by a light flyweight title bout between Donnie Nietes and Carlos Velarde, and which took place at the Waterfront Hotel & Casino in Cebu City, Philippines on 15 November 2014. Fajardo stepped in as a late notice replacement for Virgilio Silvano. Despite coming into the fight as a significant favorite, Rodríguez failed to win the bout, as it ended in a split decision draw. One judge scored the fight 96–94 for Fajardo, the second judge scored it 98–92 for Rodríguez, while the third judge scored it as an even 95–95 draw.

An immediate rematch was booked for 31 January 2015. It took place at the Palenque de la Feria in Tuxtla Gutiérrez, Mexico. Rodríguez Jr. won the fight by unanimous decision, with scores of 100–92, 97–92 and 99–90.

==== Rodríguez Jr. vs. Nietes ====
On 3 June 2015, it was revealed that Rodríguez Jr. would challenge the reigning WBO and The Ring light flyweight champion Donnie Nietes. The fight headlined a beIN Sports and ABS-CBN broadcast card, that took place on 11 July 2015 in Nietes' native Philippines. Nietes retained the titles by unanimous decision, with scores of 118–110, 119–109 and 115–113.

=== Super flyweight ===
==== Title run ====
After failing to capture the WBO flyweight title, Rodríguez Jr. moved up to super flyweight. He faced the former WBO light flyweight champion Ramón García Hirales, in his first fight at super flyweight, on 20 February 2016. He won the fight by unanimous decision, with scores of 99–89, 99–88 and 96–91. Rodríguez knocked Hirales down twice in the seventh round and once in the eight round, although he was unable to finish him.

Rodríguez Jr. next faced Johnny Michel Garcia in a tune-up fight on 23 July 2016. He won the fight by a fifth-round technical knockout. He was leading on all three of the judges' scorecards at the time of the stoppage, with scores of 50–45, 50–45 and 49–46. Rodríguez Jr. was booked to face Crison Omayao on 29 October 2016, at the Palenque Vicente Fernandez in Gomez Palacio, Mexico. He knocked Omayao down once in the fourth round, before knocking him out in the fifth round.

Rodríguez Jr. faced Hajime Nagai on 4 February 2017, in his first fight of the year. He won the fight by technical decision, with all three judges scoring the bout 50–43 in his favor. The fight was stopped at the 1:22 minute mark of the fifth round, as Nagai was unable to continue due to an eye swelling and watering caused by an accidental elbow strike.

Rodríguez Jr. was next booked to face the undefeated Elias Joaquino on 12 August 2017. He won the fight by a seventh-round knockout, after having knocked Joaquino down once in the seventh round. He was leading at the time of the stoppage, with all three judges' having scored the fight 70–61 in his favor.

Rodríguez Jr. faced the 60-fight veteran Ronald Ramos on 16 December 2017. He had a great start to the fight, knocking Ramos in the very first round, and won the fight by a sixth-round technical knockout.

Rodríguez Jr. faced the former Japanese super flyweight champion and one time WBO Asia Pacific and OPBF title challenger Yohei Tobe on 9 June 2018, for the vacant WBC Latino Silver Super Flyweight belt. He knocked Tobe down twice by the 2:33 minute mark of the second round, prompting Tobe's corner to throw in the towel.

Rodríguez Jr. faced the former WBA flyweight champion and one-time interim super flyweight title challenger Hernán Márquez on 20 October 2018. He won the fight by a third-round technical knockout. Rodríguez knocked Márquez with a short left cross 30 seconds into the third round, which didn't leave his opponent visibly hurt as he was able to beat the ten-count. Rodríguez floored Márquez down with another left cross in the final minute of the round, which left him unable to rise from the canvas. Referee Florentino Lopez decided to wave the fight off at the 2:10 minute mark, without administering the full ten-count.

Rodríguez Jr. faced fellow former mini flyweight champion Oswaldo Novoa on 6 April 2019. He won the fight by a narrow unanimous decision, with all three judges scoring the bout 95–94 in his favor.

Rodríguez Jr. faced the undefeated David Barreto on 1 June 2019, who entered the fight on a 12-fight winning streak. He won the fight by a second-round stoppage, as Barreto's corner chose to retire their fighter at the end of the round.

Following a third-round stoppage of William Riera on 26 October 2019, Rodríguez Jr. was booked to face Jose Maria Cardenas on 30 November 2019, with the vacant WBC Latino super flyweight title on the line. He won the fight by a sixth-round technical knockout.

==== Rodríguez Jr. vs Ioka ====
On 2 December 2020, it was revealed that Rodríguez Jr. would challenge the reigning WBC super flyweight champion Julio Cesar Martinez. The fight was expected to take place on the undercard of the Canelo Álvarez and Callum Smith super middleweight title bout, which took place on 19 December 2020 at the Alamodome in San Antonio, Texas. Martinez withdrew from the fight on 10 December, due to a non-COVID-19 related illness.

On 1 June 2021, the WBO ordered their reigning champion Kazuto Ioka to face Rodríguez Jr., who was at the time the #2 ranked super flyweight contender, in a mandatory title defense. The pair came to terms three weeks later, on 21 June, therefore successfully avoiding a purse bid. The fight was scheduled to take place on 1 September 2021, at the Ota City General Gymnasium in Tokyo, Japan. Ioka won the fight by unanimous decision, with all three judges scoring the fight 116–112 in his favor.

==== Later super flyweight career ====
After his second failed title bid, Rodríguez Jr. moved up to bantamweight. He faced Arnulfo Salvador Rodriguez on 14 January 2022. Rodríguez Jr. won the fight by a seventh-round technical knockout. Rodríguez Jr. returned to super flyweight to face Erick Omar Lopez on 16 July 2022. He won the fight by a unanimous decision.

Rodríguez Jr. faced the WBO flyweight champion Junto Nakatani in a super flyweight non-title bout on 1 November 2022, on the undercard of the Hiroto Kyoguchi and Kenshiro Teraji title unification bout. He lost the fight by unanimous decision, with scores of 98–91, 97–92 and 99–90. Rodríguez Jr. was deducted a point in the seventh round for landing a low blow.

=== Interim WBC flyweight champion ===
==== Rodríguez Jr. vs. Yafai ====
Rodríguez was in mandatory position to challenge British boxer Galal Yafai for his WBC interim flyweight title. The fight went to purse bids, with a winning bid of $222,000 by sole bidders Matchroom Boxing in March 2025. In April, the card was announced to take place at the bp pulse LIVE in Birmingham, England on 21 June 2025.

Rodríguez became the new WBC interim champion after defeating Yafai via a lopsided unanimous decision. Rodríguez showed that his experience, toughness, and all-around ability was too much for Yafai. The scorecards read 119–108, 119–108, and 118–109 all in favour of Rodríguez. He applied a non-stop attack from the beginning, while Yafai was never allowed to get close to hurting him. Yafai showed a lot of heart to hear the final bell. By mid fight, both boxers were cut around the eyes. Yafai was dropped in the seventh round, only for the referee to not call it a knockdown. it was evident from here that Yafai needed a stoppage, but he could not keep up with the pace Rodríguez had set. Prior to the ninth round, both men were checked over by the ringside doctor. Yafai was dropped in the twelfth round, but beat the count. His trainer Rob McCracken had the towel in his hands from this point, but allowed his boxer to hear the final bell. Rodríguez was now the mandatory for full champion Kenshiro Teraji. Rodríguez threw over 1000 punches, landing over half of them. CompuBox showed Rodríguez landed 575 of 1089 punches thrown (53%) and Yafai connected with 230 of his 795 thrown (34%). It was later revealed that Rodríguez tested positive for the cardiac stimulant heptaminol, resulting in the WBC reinstating Yafai as interim champion. The WBC also requested the BBBofC to overturn the result to a no contest. Rodríguez was later cleared of intentional drug use but placed by the WBC on a 12-month probationary period. A rematch with Yafai was originally ordered but later canceled. It emerged that Rodríguez had also failed a post-fight drug test in his previous fight against Josue Jesus Morales on 15 December 2024 in San Antonio, Texas, a result scored as a unanimous decision win but changed to a no contest.

On 25 October 2025, Rodríguez defeated Jesus Faro (17–11, 12 KOs) by TKO in the second round. Faro was a late replacement for Raul Rubio.

Rodríguez was handed a two-year ban from boxing in the UK on 30 March 2026 for his failed drug test following the fight with Yafai. The ban is retroactive and began on 30 July 2025 and will end on 30 July 2027. Furthermore, the result was eventually overturned to a no contest on March 30, 2026.

== Professional boxing record ==
| 49 fights | 40 wins | 6 losses |
|---|---|---|
| By knockout | 28 | 1 |
| By decision | 12 | 5 |
| Draws | 1 | |
| No contests | 2 | |

| No. | Result | Record | Opponent | Type | Round, time | Date | Location | Notes |
|---|---|---|---|---|---|---|---|---|
| 49 | Win | 40–6–1 (2) | Jesus Faro | TKO | 2 (10), 2:11 | 25 Oct 2025 | Guadalupe, Mexico | |
| 48 | NC | 39–6–1 (2) | Galal Yafai | NC | 12 | 21 Jun 2025 | bp pulse LIVE, Birmingham, England | WBC interim flyweight title at stake; Originally a UD win for Rodriguez, overturned after he failed a drug test |
| 47 | NC | 39–6–1 (1) | Josue Morales | NC | 8 | 15 Dec 2024 | Boeing Center at Tech Port, San Antonio, Texas, U.S. | Originally UD win for Rodríguez Jr, later ruled NC after he failed a drug test |
| 46 | Win | 39–6–1 | Jorge Ignacio Villalobos | TKO | 1 (10), 1:03 | 3 Aug 2024 | Guadalajara, Mexico | |
| 45 | Win | 38–6–1 | Jose Javier Torres | TKO | 3 (10), 2:54 | 16 Mar 2024 | Guadalajara, Mexico | |
| 44 | Win | 37–6–1 | Joel Cordova | UD | 10 | 27 Jan 2023 | San Pedro, Mexico | |
| 43 | Loss | 36–6–1 | Junto Nakatani | UD | 10 | 1 Nov 2022 | Saitama Super Arena, Saitama, Japan | |
| 42 | Win | 36–5–1 | Erick Omar Lopez | UD | 10 | 16 Jul 2022 | Torreón, Mexico | |
| 41 | Win | 35–5–1 | Arnulfo Salvador | TKO | 7 (10), 2:55 | 14 Jan 2022 | Arena Jose Sulaimán, Monterrey, Mexico | |
| 40 | Loss | 34–5–1 | Kazuto Ioka | UD | 12 | 1 Sep 2021 | Ota City General Gymnasium, Tokyo, Japan | For WBO super-flyweight title |
| 39 | Win | 34–4–1 | Martin Tecuapetla | SD | 10 | 26 Feb 2021 | Lienzo Charro, Talpa de Allende, Mexico | |
| 38 | Win | 33–4–1 | Jose Maria Cardenas | KO | 6 (10), 0:21 | 30 Nov 2019 | Palenque de la Feria, Ciudad Victoria, Mexico | Won vacant WBC Latino super-flyweight title |
| 37 | Win | 32–4–1 | William Riera | TKO | 3 (10), 0:20 | 26 Oct 2019 | Plaza de Toros, Cancún, Mexico | |
| 36 | Win | 31–4–1 | David Barreto | RTD | 2 (12), 3:00 | 1 Jun 2019 | Gimnasio Municipal del Pueblo Mágico, Linares, Mexico | |
| 35 | Win | 30–4–1 | Oswaldo Novoa | UD | 10 | 6 Apr 2019 | Grand Oasis Arena, Cancún, Mexico | |
| 34 | Win | 29–4–1 | Hernán Márquez | KO | 3 (12), 1:20 | 20 Oct 2018 | Centro de Convenciones, Cozumel, Mexico | |
| 33 | Win | 28–4–1 | Yohei Tobe | KO | 2 (12), 2:33 | 9 Jun 2018 | Gimnasio Nuevo León, Monterrey, Mexico | |
| 32 | Win | 27–4–1 | Pablo Carrillo | TKO | 4 (12), 1:54 | 24 Mar 2018 | Lienzo Charro, Saltillo, Mexico | |
| 31 | Win | 26–4–1 | Ronald Ramos | TKO | 6 (10), 2:45 | 16 Dec 2017 | Grand Oasis Arena, Cancún, Mexico | |
| 30 | Win | 25–4–1 | Elias Joaquino | KO | 7 (10), 2:35 | 12 Aug 2017 | Grand Oasis Arena, Cancún, Mexico | |
| 29 | Win | 24–4–1 | Hector Rolando Gusman | KO | 3 (12), 1:35 | 3 Jun 2017 | Grand Oasis Arena, Cancún, Mexico | |
| 28 | Win | 23–4–1 | Hajime Nagai | TD | 5 (10), 1:22 | 4 Feb 2017 | Grand Oasis Arena, Cancún, Mexico | Nagai could not continue from accidental elbow |
| 27 | Win | 22–4–1 | Crison Omayao | TKO | 5 (8), 1:21 | 29 Oct 2016 | Palenque Vicente Fernandez, Gomez Palacio, Mexico | |
| 26 | Win | 21–4–1 | Johnny Michel Garcia | TKO | 5 (8), 2:44 | 23 Jul 2016 | Grand Oasis Arena, Cancún, Mexico | |
| 25 | Win | 20–4–1 | Ramón García Hirales | UD | 10 | 20 Feb 2016 | Arena José Sulaimán, Monterrey, Mexico | |
| 24 | Loss | 19–4–1 | Moisés Fuentes | SD | 12 | 5 Dec 2015 | Gimnasio Municipal Gustavo Díaz Ordaz, Tecate, Mexico | |
| 23 | Loss | 19–3–1 | Donnie Nietes | UD | 12 | 11 Jul 2015 | Waterfront Hotel & Casino, Cebu City, Philippines | For WBO and The Ring light-flyweight title |
| 22 | Win | 19–2–1 | Jomar Fajardo | UD | 10 | 31 Jan 2015 | Palenque de la Feria, Tuxtla Gutierrez, Mexico | |
| 21 | Draw | 18–2–1 | Jomar Fajardo | SD | 10 | 15 Nov 2014 | Waterfront Hotel & Casino, Cebu City, Philippines | |
| 20 | Win | 18–2 | Katsunari Takayama | UD | 12 | 9 Aug 2014 | Arena Monterrey, Monterrey, Mexico | Retained WBO mini-flyweight title; Won IBF mini-flyweight title |
| 19 | Win | 17–2 | Merlito Sabillo | TKO | 10 (12), 1:00 | 22 Mar 2014 | Arena Monterrey, Monterrey, Mexico | Won WBO mini-flyweight title |
| 18 | Win | 16–2 | Ernesto Guerrero | TD | 5 (8), 2:11 | 18 Jan 2014 | Gimnasio del Estado, Hermosillo, Mexico | Unanimous TD after Guerrero cut |
| 17 | Win | 15–2 | Moises Calleros | UD | 12 | 15 Nov 2013 | Monterrey, Mexico | |
| 16 | Loss | 14–2 | Román González | TKO | 7 (10), 1:10 | 21 Sep 2013 | Crowne Plaza, Managua, Nicaragua | |
| 15 | Win | 14–1 | Victor Ruiz | TKO | 5 (8), 2:08 | 13 Jul 2013 | Forum Tecate, Tijuana, Mexico | |
| 14 | Win | 13–1 | Ivan Rodriguez | TKO | 5 (12), 2:16 | 19 Apr 2013 | Arena Solidaridad, Monterrey, Mexico | Won vacant NABF light-flyweight title |
| 13 | Win | 12–1 | Manuel Vargas | TKO | 3 (6), 0:44 | 26 Jan 2013 | Auditorio del Bicentenario, Morelia, Mexico | |
| 12 | Win | 11–1 | Eduardo Hernandez | TKO | 5 (6), 1:00 | 14 Dec 2012 | Arena Solidaridad, Monterrey, Mexico | |
| 11 | Win | 10–1 | Francisco Perez | SD | 8 | 8 Sep 2012 | Deportivo del Sindicato del Metro, Mexico City, Mexico | |
| 10 | Win | 9–1 | Jorge Guerrero | TKO | 4 (6), 2:27 | 21 Jul 2012 | Auditorio Fausto Gutierrez Moreno, Tijuana, Mexico | |
| 9 | Loss | 8–1 | Salvador Arias | UD | 6 | 18 May 2012 | Arena TKT Box Tour, Puerto Vallarta, Mexico | |
| 8 | Win | 8–0 | Sergio Nunez | MD | 4 | 3 Mar 2012 | Auditorio Fausto Gutierrez Moreno, Tijuana, Mexico | |
| 7 | Win | 7–0 | Luis Gonzalez | TKO | 1 (6), 2:24 | 17 Dec 2011 | Palenque de la Feria, Ciudad Obregón, Mexico | |
| 6 | Win | 6–0 | Artemio Garcia | TKO | 1 (4), 1:48 | 15 Sep 2011 | Auditorio Ernesto Rufo, Rosarito, Mexico | |
| 5 | Win | 5–0 | Arturo Castro | TKO | 2 (6), 3:00 | 6 Aug 2011 | Cortijo San Felipe, Monterrey, Mexico | |
| 4 | Win | 4–0 | Gerardo Garay | KO | 2 (4), 2:59 | 18 Mar 2011 | Arena Solidaridad, Monterrey, Mexico | |
| 3 | Win | 3–0 | Mike Gueska | KO | 1 (4), 0:24 | 4 Mar 2011 | Music Hall, Ciudad Victoria, Mexico | |
| 2 | Win | 2–0 | Reynaldo Avila | KO | 2 (4), 1:21 | 7 Oct 2010 | Estadio de Béisbol, Monterrey, Mexico | |
| 1 | Win | 1–0 | Erick Ventura | TKO | 1 (4), 0:01 | 2 Oct 2010 | Estadio de Béisbol, Monterrey, Mexico | |

== See also ==
- List of Mexican boxing world champions
- List of world mini-flyweight boxing champions

Sporting positions
Regional boxing titles
| Vacant Title last held by Pedro Guevara | NABF light-flyweight champion 19 April – December 2013; Vacated | Vacant Title next held by Jose Javier Torres |
| Vacant Title last held by Ricardo Blandon | WBC Latino super-flyweight champion 30 November 2019 – August 2020; Vacated | Vacant Title next held by Geraldo Valdez |
World boxing titles
| Preceded by Merlito Sabillo | WBO mini-flyweight champion 22 March – 15 December 2014; Vacated | Vacant Title next held by Katsunari Takayama |
| Preceded by Katsunari Takayama | IBF mini-flyweight champion 9 August – 1 October 2014; Vacated | Vacant Title next held by Katsunari Takayama |
