= Jorle Estrada =

Colombian boxer (born 1989)

Personal information
- Nationality: Colombian
- Born: Jorle Jacinto Estrada Villadiego; April 3, 1989 (age 37) San Pelayo, Colombia
- Height: 5 ft 3 in (160 cm)
- Weight: Minimumweight; Light flyweight; Super bantamweight

Boxing career
- Stance: Orthodox

Boxing record
- Total fights: 27
- Wins: 19
- Win by KO: 8
- Losses: 8

Jorle Estrada (born 3 April 1989) is a Colombian minimumweight boxer. Estrada lost to Merlito Sabillo for the WBO minimumweight title. Estrada has also fought Carlos Velarde, Carlos Buitrago and Alexis Díaz.

== Professional boxing record ==
27 fights	19 wins	8 losses
By knockout	8	5
By decision	11	3

No.	Result	Record	Opponent	Type	Round, time	Date	Location	Notes
27	Win	19–8	(Colombia) Gustavo Agamez	RTD	4 (6), 3:00	10 Nov 2018	Plaza Principal, Ciénaga de Oro, Colombia	
26	Loss	18–8	(Venezuela) Alexis Díaz	RTD	5 (11), 3:00	10 May 2014	Polideportivo José María Vargas, La Guaira, Venezuela	For vacant WBA Fedelatin minimumweight title
25	Win	18–7	(Colombia) Eliecer Solar	KO	1 (4), 1:59	1 Mar 2014	Coliseo Irene Pacheco, San Juan de Urabá, Colombia	
24	Loss	17–7	(Philippines) Merlito Sabillo	KO	9 (12), 1:09	13 Jul 2013	Solaire Resort & Casino, Pasay, Philippines	For WBO minimumweight title
23	Win	17–6	(Colombia) Gustavo Cortes	KO	3 (6)	8 Jun 2013	Instalaciones IMDER, Planeta Rica, Colombia	
22	Win	16–6	(Colombia) Jorge Ballesteros	UD	6	1 Sep 2012	Coliseo San Vicente, Sincelejo, Colombia	
21	Win	15–6	(Colombia) Jose Antonio Jimenez	SD	10	8 Jun 2012	Coliseo Miguel "Happy" Lora, Montería, Colombia	Won vacant South American minimumweight title
20	Win	14–6	(Colombia) Jorge Ballesteros	TKO	1 (6), 2:38	17 Mar 2012	Discoteca Bahia, Montelíbano, Colombia	
19	Loss	13–6	(Mexico) Pedro Guevara	TKO	7 (12), 2:17	22 Oct 2011	Auditorio Luis Estrada Medina, Guasave, Mexico	For vacant WBC–NABF light flyweight title
18	Win	13–5	(Colombia) Jaime Villeros	KO	1 (6), 2:10	21 May 2011	Gallera La Estaca, San Onofre, Colombia	
17	Loss	12–5	(Colombia) Gabriel Mendoza	SD	9	20 Mar 2011	Gimnasio Militar de la Brigada 11, Montería, Colombia	For WBA Fedebol minimumweight title
16	Win	12–4	(Colombia) Nelson Cantero	UD	6	12 Mar 2011	Cancha Parroquial, San Pelayo, Colombia	
15	Loss	11–4	(Nicaragua) Carlos Buitrago	TKO	6 (9), 2:25	25 Nov 2010	Pharaoh's Casino, Managua, Nicaragua	For WBA Fedecentro minimumweight title
14	Win	11–3	(Colombia) Wilmer Jinete	KO	2 (6), 2:59	16 Oct 2010	Plaza Principal, Corozal, Colombia	
13	Loss	10–3	(Mexico) Carlos Velarde	TKO	3 (10), 2:56	28 Aug 2010	Lobodome, Mazatlán, Mexico	For vacant WBC Youth Intercontinental minimumweight title
12	Loss	10–2	(Panama) Walter Tello	UD	10	17 Jun 2010	Discoteca Dubai, Panama City, Panama	
11	Loss	10–1	(Colombia) Nelson Cantero	MD	8	17 Apr 2010	Escuela Asociación Unidos de Sahagún, Sahagún, Colombia	
10	Win	10–0	(Colombia) Deivis Narvaez	UD	6	5 Mar 2010	Parqueadero El Papi, Santa Cruz de Lorica, Colombia	
9	Win	9–0	(Colombia) Alfonso De la Hoz	MD	6	20 Dec 2009	Gallera Bonga Mella, San Pelayo, Colombia	
8	Win	8–0	(Colombia) Over Bolanos	UD	8	8 Nov 2009	Polideportivo Colegio Santa Teresita, San Pelayo, Colombia	
7	Win	7–0	(Colombia) Mauricio Fuentes	UD	6	22 Aug 2009	Plaza Central, San Pelayo, Colombia	
6	Win	6–0	(Colombia) Deivis Narvaez	UD	4	8 Aug 2009	Colegio San Carlos de Colosina, San Carlos, Colombia	
5	Win	5–0	(Colombia) Jose Luis Oviedo	UD	4	16 May 2009	Cancha Parroquial, San Pelayo, Colombia	
4	Win	4–0	(Colombia) Darwin Torres	KO	3 (4), 0:35	25 Apr 2009	Escuela Asociación Unidos de Sahagún, Sahagún, Colombia	
3	Win	3–0	(Colombia) Alexander Vega	UD	4	6 Mar 2009	Gimnasio Beibis Mendoza, Arboletes, Colombia	
2	Win	2–0	(Colombia) Deivis Alvarez	UD	4	5 Dec 2008	Coliseo Miguel "Happy" Lora, Montería, Colombia	
1	Win	1–0	(Colombia) Carlos Narvaez	KO	3 (4), 2:19	15 Nov 2008	Plaza Central, San Pelayo, Colombia	
