= Oswaldo Novoa =

Mexican boxer (born 1982)

Personal information
- Nickname: El Gallito
- Born: Oswaldo Novoa Mora; 2 February 1982 (age 44) Guadalajara, Mexico
- Height: 5 ft 3 in (160 cm)
- Weight: Mini flyweight; Light flyweight; Flyweight

Boxing career
- Reach: 63 in (160 cm)
- Stance: Orthodox

Boxing record
- Total fights: 28
- Wins: 14
- Win by KO: 9
- Losses: 10
- Draws: 4

Oswaldo Novoa Mora (born 2 February 1982) is a Mexican professional boxer who held the WBC strawweight title in 2014.

== Professional career ==
On 5 October 2012, Novoa defeated José Alfredo Zúñiga by twelfth round unanimous decision to win the WBC FECOMBOX Light Flyweight title.

Novoa won his first world title when he defeated Xiong Zhao Zhong by fifth-round knockout to win the WBC Minimumweight title on 5 February 2014.

== Professional boxing record ==
28 fights	14 wins	10 losses
By knockout	9	3
By decision	5	7
Draws	4	

No.	Result	Record	Opponent	Type	Round, time	Date	Location	Notes
28	Loss	14–10–4	(Mexico) Esteban Bermudez	KO	4 (8), 2:20	4 October 2019	Gimnasio Mexico 68, Guadalajara, Mexico	
27	Loss	14–9–4	(Mexico) Francisco Rodríguez Jr.	UD	10	6 April 2019	Grand Oasis Arena, Cancún, Mexico	
26	Draw	14–8–4	(Mexico) Erik Omar Lopez Garcia	SD	10	1 December 2018	Domo del Parque San Rafael, Guadalajara, Mexico	For vacant WBC–FECOMBOX light flyweight title
25	Loss	14–8–3	(Mexico) Pedro Guevara	SD	8	13 May 2017	Foro Aga de Palcco, Zapopan, Mexico	
24	Loss	14–7–3	(Mexico) Saúl Juárez	UD	10	19 March 2016	Centro de Espectáculos del Recinto Ferial, Metepec, Mexico	
23	Draw	14–6–3	(Mexico) Saúl Juárez	TD	1 (12), 0:42	12 December 2015	Auditorio BB, Mexico City, Mexico	TD after Novoa cut from accidental head clash
22	Loss	14–6–2	(Mexico) Moisés Fuentes	KO	6 (10), 1:01	25 July 2015	Polideportivo Centenario, Los Mochis, Mexico	For vacant WBO–NABO flyweight title
21	Draw	14–5–2	(Mexico) Mario Andrade	MD	10	21 February 2015	Centro de Espectaculos, Epazoyucan, Mexico	
20	Loss	14–5–1	(Thailand) Wanheng Menayothin	RTD	9 (12), 3:00	6 November 2014	Provincial Gymnasium, Chonburi, Thailand	Lost WBC strawweight title
19	Win	14–4–1	(Nicaragua) Alcides Martinez	RTD	8 (12), 3:00	28 June 2014	Centro de Espectaculos, Epazoyucan, Mexico	Retained WBC strawweight title
18	Win	13–4–1	(China) Xiong Chaozhong	TKO	5 (12), 2:36	5 February 2014	City Hall, Haikou, China	Won WBC strawweight title
17	Win	12–4–1	(Mexico) Job Solano	TKO	6 (10)	3 August 2013	Deportivo Agustín Ramos Millan, Toluca, Mexico	
16	Win	11–4–1	(Mexico) Javier Martínez Resendiz	TKO	4 (10), 2:07	2 March 2013	Gimnasio de las Liebres, Río Bravo, Mexico	
15	Win	10–4–1	(Mexico) Ariel Guzman	TKO	7 (8), 1:21	3 November 2012	Unidad Deportiva El Chamizal, Zamora, Mexico	
14	Win	9–4–1	(Mexico) José Alfredo Zúñiga	UD	12	5 October 2012	Arena Jalisco, Guadalajara, Mexico	Won WBC–FECOMBOX light flyweight title
13	Win	8–4–1	(Mexico) Jose Argumedo	SD	8	27 July 2012	Lienzo Charro, Lagos de Moreno, Mexico	
12	Loss	7–4–1	(Mexico) Carlos Velarde	TD	6 (10), 2:40	25 May 2012	Parque Revolucion, Culiacán, Mexico	Unanimous TD after Velarde cut from accidental head clash
11	Win	7–3–1	(Mexico) Marvin Diaz	UD	6	27 April 2012	Arena Jalisco, Guadalajara, Mexico	
10	Loss	6–3–1	(Mexico) Saúl Juárez	UD	8	26 November 2011	Plaza de Toros, Mexico City, Mexico	
9	Loss	6–2–1	(Mexico) Jesús Silvestre	SD	8	27 May 2011	Arena Jalisco, Guadalajara, Mexico	
8	Loss	6–1–1	(Mexico) Jose Argumedo	MD	10	21 January 2011	Arena Jalisco, Guadalajara, Mexico	
7	Win	6–0–1	(Mexico) Vicente Hernandez	TKO	9 (12), 1:59	3 December 2010	Arena Jalisco, Guadalajara, Mexico	Won vacant Mexico Jalisco State light flyweight title
6	Win	5–0–1	(Mexico) Heriberto Rivas	KO	2 (8), 2:47	29 October 2010	Arena Jalisco, Guadalajara, Mexico	
5	Win	4–0–1	(Mexico) José Argumedo	MD	8	27 August 2010	Arena Jalisco, Guadalajara, Mexico	
4	Win	3–0–1	(Mexico) Hugo Camarena	TKO	2 (6), 0:45	30 July 2010	Arena Jalisco, Guadalajara, Mexico	
3	Win	2–0–1	(Mexico) Heriberto Rivas	TKO	2 (6), 1:40	25 June 2010	Arena Jalisco, Guadalajara, Mexico	
2	Win	1–0–1	(Mexico) Diuhl Olguin	MD	4	21 May 2010	Coliseo Olimpico de la UG, Guadalajara, Mexico	
1	Draw	0–0–1	(Mexico) Alejandro González Jr.	PTS	4	19 March 2010	Coliseo Olimpico de la UG, Guadalajara, Mexico	

== See also ==
- List of world mini-flyweight boxing champions
- List of Mexican boxing world champions

Sporting positions
World boxing titles
Preceded by Xiong Chaozhong	WBC strawweight champion 5 February 2014 – 6 November 2014	Succeeded by Wanheng Menayothin
