= José Argumedo =

Mexican boxer (born 1988)

Personal information
- Nickname: Tecuala
- Born: José Eduardo Argumedo Barraza; 14 October 1988 (age 37) Tepic, Nayarit, Mexico
- Height: 5 ft 3 in (160 cm)
- Weight: Mini flyweight; Light flyweight

Boxing career
- Reach: 64 in (163 cm)
- Stance: Orthodox

Boxing record
- Total fights: 30
- Wins: 24
- Win by KO: 15
- Losses: 5
- Draws: 1

José Eduardo Argumedo Barraza (born 14 October 1988) is a Mexican professional boxer who held the IBF mini flyweight title from 2015 to 2017.

== Career ==
Argumedo worked as a baker and a taquero prior to becoming a boxer. He was trained by Lorenzo Bermúdez as an amateur and as a professional by Eddie Reynoso, the latter also trains Canelo Álvarez. As an amateur, Argumedo medaled at the National Olympiad. Argumedo currently owns a taquería in his hometown of Tepic. Argumedo made his pro debut on August 27, 2010, losing to Oswaldo Novoa on points. Argumedo later avenged the loss to Novoa, beating him by majority decision on January 21, 2011, improving his record to 2–1. Argumedo won his first professional title, the WBC light flyweight title, by defeating Saúl Juárez via unanimous decision in 2012. Argumedo built a lead on the early rounds, and survived Juárez's body attack in the second half of the fight to secure the win.

Agumedo defeated Katsunari Takayama by split technical decision to win the IBF mini flyweight title on December 31, 2015. Takayama suffered a cut due to an accidental headbutt in the second round and another one on the ninth round, after the latter Takayama was deemed unable to continue and the fight went to the scorecards. Argumedo was ahead 87–84 on two of them, and Takayama was ahead 86–85 on the third, giving Argumedo the win and the title. In July 2016, Argumedo comfortably outboxed and decisioned Julio Mendoza to notch his first title defense in his hometown. Argumedo made a second defense in 2016, defeating Jose Jimenez by technical knockout on round 3, having dropped him twice in that round.

Argumedo's third title defense came against Gabriel Mendoza. On round 8 of the fight, Mendoza sustained a cut over his left eye and the doctor ruled him unable to continue, giving Argumedo the win by technical knockout. After the fight, Reynoso mentioned Argumedo's next title defense would take place in Japan. Hiroto Kyoguchi was Argumedo's next challenger. Prior to the fight, Kyoguchi stated that Argumedo was vulnerable to consistent body punching. Argumedo missed weight prior to the bout, and was stripped of his belt. Nevertheless, Kyoguchi claimed the title, beating Argumedo by unanimous decision in a clinch-heavy fight. Kyoguchi scored a knockdown with a left hand with 40 seconds left on round 9, Argumedo was able to survive until the break despite Kyoguchi throwing a flurry of punches.

== Professional boxing record ==
30 fights	24 wins	5 losses
By knockout	15	0
By decision	9	5
Draws	1	

No.	Result	Record	Opponent	Type	Round, time	Date	Location	Notes
30	Loss	24–5–1	(Cuba) Daniel Matellon	UD	12	Jun 26, 2021	Arena Alcalde, Guadalajara, Mexico	For WBA interim light flyweight title
29	Win	24–4–1	(Mexico) Noe Medina	RTD	4 (8), 3:00	Mar 26, 2021	Deportivo Morelos, Tepic, Mexico	
28	Win	23–4–1	(Venezuela) Alexis Díaz	TKO	5 (12), 0:51	Mar 9, 2019	Centro de Convenciones, Tamazula, Mexico	
27	Win	22–4–1	(Mexico) Moisés Calleros	UD	10	Jul 7, 2018	Domo del Parque San Rafael, Guadalajara, Mexico	
26	Win	21–4–1	(Mexico) Edgar Cibrian	TKO	4 (10), 1:40	Mar 10, 2018	Domo del Parque San Rafael, Guadalajara, Mexico	
25	Loss	20–4–1	(Japan) Hiroto Kyoguchi	UD	12	Jul 23, 2017	Ota City General Gymnasium, Tokyo, Japan	Lost IBF mini flyweight title
24	Win	20–3–1	(Colombia) Gabriel Mendoza	TKO	8 (12), 0:58	May 27, 2017	Arena TV Azteca, Monterrey, Mexico	Retained IBF mini flyweight title
23	Win	19–3–1	(Colombia) Jose Antonio Jimenez	TKO	3 (12), 1:22	Nov 12, 2016	Los Terrenos de la Feria de la FENAHUAP, Ciudad Valles, Mexico	Retained IBF mini flyweight title
22	Win	18–3–1	(Nicaragua) Julio Mendoza	UD	12	Jul 1, 2016	El Palenque de la Feria, Tepic, Mexico	Retained IBF mini flyweight title
21	Win	17–3–1	(Japan) Katsunari Takayama	TD	9 (12), 3:00	Dec 31, 2015	Prefectural Gymnasium, Osaka, Japan	Won IBF mini flyweight title; Split TD after Takayama cut
20	Win	16–3–1	(Mexico) Jose Rivas	TKO	3 (10), 2:20	Jul 18, 2015	Estadio de Beisbol de Tecuala, Tecuala, Mexico	
19	Win	15–3–1	(Mexico) Irving Requena	TKO	2 (8), 2:25	Nov 8, 2014	Cometas de Querétaro, Querétaro, Mexico	
18	Loss	14–3–1	(Mexico) Carlos Velarde	SD	10	May 3, 2014	Palenque de la Feria Ganadera, Culiacán, Mexico	For vacant IBF Latino mini flyweight title
17	Win	14–2–1	(Mexico) Javier Martínez Resendiz	TKO	3 (12), 2:10	Oct 18, 2013	Palenque de Tepic, Tepic, Mexico	
16	Win	13–2–1	(Mexico) Juan Luis Lopez	TKO	5 (12)	Jul 19, 2013	Palenque de Tepic, Tepic, Mexico	Won vacant Mexican light flyweight title
15	Win	12–2–1	(Mexico) Martin Tecuapetla	UD	10	May 4, 2013	Gimnasio Las Palmas, Las Varas, Mexico	
14	Win	11–2–1	(Mexico) Saul Camilo Ramirez	TKO	5 (10)	Mar 8, 2013	Gimnasio Las Palmas, Las Varas, Mexico	
13	Win	10–2–1	(Mexico) Juan Carlos Ramirez	TKO	2 (10), 2:30	Feb 2, 2013	El Palenque de la Feria, Tepic, Mexico	
12	Win	9–2–1	(Mexico) Eduardo Gonzalez	PTS	8	Oct 6, 2012	El Palenque de la Feria, Tepic, Mexico	
11	Loss	8–2–1	(Mexico) Oswaldo Novoa	SD	8	Jul 27, 2012	Lienzo Charro, Lagos de Moreno, Mexico	
10	Win	8–1–1	(Mexico) Saúl Juárez	UD	12	Jun 9, 2012	Arena Jalisco, Guadalajara, Mexico	Won vacant WBC–CABOFE light flyweight title
9	Draw	7–1–1	(Mexico) José Alfredo Zúñiga	TD	3 (8), 0:18	Mar 10, 2012	Gimnasio de las Liebres, Río Bravo, Mexico	
8	Win	7–1	(Mexico) Gerardo Garay	KO	1 (6), 2:16	Feb 4, 2012	Gimnasio de las Liebres, Río Bravo, Mexico	
7	Win	6–1	(Mexico) Heriberto Rivas	UD	4	Dec 10, 2011	El Palenque de la Feria, Tepic, Mexico	
6	Win	5–1	(Mexico) Ernesto Guerrero	TKO	5 (6)	Nov 19, 2011	Gimnasio German Evers, Mazatlán, Mexico	
5	Win	4–1	(Mexico) Mauro Guillen	TKO	7 (8)	Aug 27, 2011	Gimnasio Niños Héroes, Tepic, Mexico	
4	Win	3–1	(Mexico) Jonathan Torres	TKO	5 (6), 1:13	Apr 15, 2011	Arena Jalisco, Guadalajara, Mexico	
3	Win	2–1	(Mexico) Oswaldo Novoa	MD	10	Jan 21, 2011	Arena Jalisco, Guadalajara, Mexico	
2	Win	1–1	(Mexico) Gabriel Ponce	UD	4	Oct 1, 2010	Arena Jalisco, Guadalajara, Mexico	
1	Loss	0–1	(Mexico) Oswaldo Novoa	MD	8	Aug 27, 2010	Arena Jalisco, Guadalajara, Mexico	

== See also ==
- List of IBF world champions
- List of Mexican boxing world champions

Sporting positions
Regional boxing titles
Vacant Title last held by Ganigan Lopez	WBC–CABOFE light flyweight champion June 9, 2012 – October 2012; Vacated	Vacant Title next held by Ulises Lara
Vacant Title last held by Eduardo Gonzalez	Mexican light flyweight champion July 19, 2013 – December 2013; Vacated	Vacant Title next held by Juan Luis Lopez
World boxing titles
Preceded by Katsunari Takayama	IBF mini flyweight champion December 31, 2015 – July 23, 2017	Succeeded by Hiroto Kyoguchi
