= Saúl Juárez =

Mexican boxer

Personal information
- Nickname: Baby
- Born: Saúl Juárez Gil; 28 November 1990 (age 35) Mexico City, Mexico
- Weight: Mini-flyweight; Light-flyweight

Boxing career
- Stance: Orthodox

Boxing record
- Total fights: 43
- Wins: 25
- Win by KO: 13
- Losses: 16
- Draws: 2

Saúl Juárez Gil (born 28 November 1990) is a Mexican professional boxer who challenged for the WBC strawweight title in 2016 and the WBC light-flyweight title in 2018.

== Career ==
Juárez turned pro in 2010. He had a successful amateur career. Juárez won the Cinturón de Oro, an annual tournament for novice boxers, early on in his career. Juárez lost an IBF light-flyweight title eliminator to Milan Melindo in 2014. Juárez then beat Adrián Hernández twice on back-to-back fights and then defeated Oswaldo Novoa to earn a world title shot. On 2 August 2015, he faced Wanheng Menayothin for the WBC strawweight title in Chonburi. Wanheng seemed to control the fight, outjabbing and outboxing Juárez and won a close unanimous decision (116–112, 115–113, 116–113).

Juárez lost his next three fights, to Leroy Estrada, Gilberto Pedraza, and Abraham Rodríguez. Then he won against Gilberto Parra, stopping him with a barrage of punches in round 9. Juárez will get another world title shot on 31 December 2018 against Ken Shiro.

== Professional boxing record ==
43 fights	25 wins	16 losses
By knockout	13	2
By decision	12	14
Draws	2	

No.	Result	Record	Opponent	Type	Round, time	Date	Location	Notes
43	Loss	25–16–2	Ivan Garcia Carrillo	UD	10	25 Feb 2022	Auditorio BB, Mexico City, Mexico	
42	Loss	25–15–2	Anthony Olascuaga	UD	6	13 Aug 2021	Osceola Heritage Park, Kissimmee, Florida, U.S.	
41	Loss	25–14–2	Cristian Gonzalez	UD	10	25 Jun 2021	Foro Viena, Mexico City, Mexico	
40	Loss	25–13–2	Jesse Rodriguez	KO	2 (8), 2:05	12 Dec 2020	MGM Grand Conference Center, Paradise, Nevada, U.S.	
39	Loss	25–12–2	Axel Aragon Vega	UD	10	21 Aug 2020	Osceola Heritage Park, Kissimmee, Florida, U.S.	For vacant WBA Fedecentro light flyweight title
38	Loss	25–11–2	Jonathan González	UD	10	21 Feb 2020	Miccosukee Resort & Gaming, Miami, Florida, U.S.	For vacant WBO–NABO light flyweight title
37	Loss	25–10–2	Ganigan López	SD	10	19 Jul 2019	Auditorio Blackberry, Mexico City, Mexico	Lost WBC Latino light flyweight title
36	Win	25–9–2	Mario Andrade	TD	7 (10), 0:30	8 Mar 2019	Deportivo Trabajadores del Metro, Iztacalco, Mexico	Retained WBC Latino light flyweight title
35	Loss	24–9–2	Kenshiro Teraji	UD	12	30 Dec 2018	Ota City General Gymnasium, Tokyo, Japan	For WBC light flyweight title
34	Draw	24–8–2	Mario Andrade	SD	10	27 Jul 2018	Auditorio Blackberry, Mexico City, Mexico	Retained WBC Latino light flyweight title
33	Win	24–8–1	Gilberto Parra	TKO	9 (10), 1:57	9 Mar 2018	Auditorio Blackberry, Mexico City, Mexico	Won vacant WBC Latino light flyweight title
32	Loss	23–8–1	Abraham Rodríguez	MD	10	6 Dec 2017	Grand Hotel Tijuana, Tijuana, Mexico	
31	Loss	23–7–1	Gilberto Pedroza	SD	9	26 Oct 2017	Karibe Convention Center, Port-au-Prince, Haiti	For vacant WBA Fedecaribe light flyweight title
30	Loss	23–6–1	Leroy Estrada	UD	12	27 May 2017	Figali Convention Center, Panama City, Panama	
29	Loss	23–5–1	Wanheng Menayothin	UD	12	2 Aug 2016	City Hall Ground, Chonburi, Thailand	For WBC mini flyweight title
28	Win	23–4–1	Oswaldo Novoa	UD	10	19 Mar 2016	Centro de Espectáculos del Recinto Ferial, Metepec, Mexico	
27	Draw	22–4–1	Oswaldo Novoa	TD	1 (12), 0:42	12 Dec 2015	Auditorio Blackberry, Mexico City, Mexico	TD after Novoa cut from accidental head clash
26	Win	22–4	Adrián Hernández	SD	10	8 Aug 2015	Arena Coliseo, Mexico City, Mexico	
25	Win	21–4	Adrián Hernández	TKO	8 (8), 1:04	30 May 2015	Arena Coliseo, Mexico City, Mexico	
24	Loss	20–4	Milan Melindo	UD	12	15 Nov 2014	Waterfront Cebu City Hotel & Casino, Cebu City, Philippines	
23	Win	20–3	Erick Lopez	PTS	8	31 May 2014	Sala de Armas Agustín Melgar, Mexico City, Mexico	
22	Win	19–3	Luis Ceja	UD	8	8 Feb 2014	Caballerizas de Huixquilucan, Huixquilucan, Mexico	
21	Loss	18–3	Juan Hernández	PTS	8	12 Oct 2013	Hard Rock Hotel, Puerto Vallarta, Mexico	
20	Win	18–2	Samuel Gutierrez Hernandez	UD	8	13 Jul 2013	Centro de Espectáculos de la Feria de Leon, León, Mexico	
19	Win	17–2	Arturo Castro	TKO	1 (8)	13 Apr 2013	Monumental Plaza de Toros, Ciudad Hidalgo, Mexico	
18	Win	16–2	Armando Torres	KO	10 (10), 2:20	9 Feb 2013	Foro Polanco, Mexico City, Mexico	Won vacant WBC–USNBC light flyweight title
17	Win	15–2	Juan Carlos Ramirez	KO	3 (8)	5 Jan 2013	Gimnasio Carlos Zárate, Cuautla, Mexico	
16	Loss	14–2	José Argumedo	UD	12	9 Jun 2012	Arena Jalisco, Guadalajara, Mexico	For vacant WBC–CABOFE light flyweight title
15	Win	14–1	Samuel Garcia	TKO	2 (8)	19 May 2012	Palenque de la Feria, Celaya, Mexico	
14	Win	13–1	Heriberto Rivas	KO	4 (8), 2:50	13 Apr 2012	Parque Hidalgo, Arandas, Mexico	
13	Win	12–1	Reynaldo Avila	KO	2 (6), 2:29	4 Feb 2012	Gimnasio de las Liebres, Río Bravo, Mexico	
12	Win	11–1	Oswaldo Novoa	UD	8	26 Nov 2011	Plaza de Toros, Mexico City, Mexico	
11	Win	10–1	Jose Maria Segovia	TKO	3 (8)	15 Oct 2011	Centro Internacional de Convenciones, Chetumal, Mexico	
10	Win	9–1	Ricardo Estrella	KO	2 (8)	22 Sep 2011	Palacio Municipal, San Miguel de Cozumel, Mexico	
9	Win	8–1	Luis Huerta Saenz	TKO	2 (6), 0:50	6 Aug 2011	Gimnasio Municipal, Navojoa, Mexico	
8	Win	7–1	Martin Tecuapetla	MD	6	2 Jun 2011	Jose Cuervo Salon, Mexico City, Mexico	
7	Win	6–1	Luis Manuel Ramos	UD	8	9 Apr 2011	Gimnasio Carlos Zárate, Cuautla, Mexico	
6	Loss	5–1	Martin Tecuapetla	RTD	2 (6), 3:00	5 Feb 2011	Sala de Armas, Mexico City, Mexico	
5	Win	5–0	Gustavo Molina	KO	1 (6)	26 Sep 2010	San Martín Texmelucan, Mexico	
4	Win	4–0	Saul Camilo Ramirez	SD	4	22 Jul 2010	Jose Cuervo Salon, Mexico City, Mexico	Cinturón de Oro XVI: light flyweight finals
3	Win	3–0	Miguel Dominguez	UD	4	3 Jun 2010	Jose Cuervo Salon, Mexico City, Mexico	Cinturón de Oro XVI: light flyweight semifinals
2	Win	2–0	Antonio Flores	UD	4	22 Apr 2010	Jose Cuervo Salon, Mexico City, Mexico	Cinturón de Oro XVI: light flyweight quarterfinals
1	Win	1–0	Victor Marcelino Perez	TKO	1 (4), 2:49	4 Mar 2010	Jose Cuervo Salon, Mexico City, Mexico	Cinturón de Oro XVI: light flyweight preliminaries
