= Jesús Silvestre =

Mexican boxer

Personal information
- Nickname: Negrito
- Born: José Jesús Silvestre Cárdenas; November 28, 1989 (age 36) Tepic, Nayarit, Mexico
- Height: 5 ft 4 in (163 cm)
- Weight: Mini flyweight

Boxing career
- Reach: 64 in (163 cm)
- Stance: Orthodox

Boxing record
- Total fights: 47
- Wins: 37
- Win by KO: 26
- Losses: 10

José Jesús Silvestre Cárdenas (born November 28, 1989) is a Mexican former professional boxer and the former WBA World minimumweight interim champion. Silvestre is promoted by Saúl Álvarez' company, Canelo Promotions.

== Professional career ==
In February 2012, Silvestre beat the title contender Yader Escobar to become the mandatory challenger for the WBA Minimumweight title.

On July 14, 2012, Silvestre won a twelve-round decision over Edwin Díaz to capture the WBA Minimumweight Interim title. He would get a chance at the full title a little over a year later when he challenged Ryo Miyazaki, Silvestre would lose via a majority decision.

In February 2015, Silvestre would get another shot at a world when he faced South African Hekkie Budler for his IBO & WBA world titles. Silvestre would again fall short this time losing via unanimous decision.

== Professional boxing record ==
| 47 fights | 37 wins | 10 losses |
|---|---|---|
| By knockout | 26 | 3 |
| By decision | 11 | 7 |

| No. | Result | Record | Opponent | Type | Round, time | Date | Location | Notes |
|---|---|---|---|---|---|---|---|---|
| 47 | Loss | 37–10 | Jorge Leyva Torres | TKO | 6 (10), 1:49 | May 27, 2023 | Auditorio Municipal, Cabo San Lucas, Mexico | |
| 46 | Loss | 37–9 | Armando Appel | UD | 10 | Jan 21, 2023 | Arena La Paz, La Paz, Mexico | |
| 45 | Loss | 37–8 | Andrés Campos | UD | 10 | Jun 11, 2022 | Gimnasio Municipal, Lo Barnechea, Chile | For WBO Latino flyweight title |
| 44 | Win | 37–7 | Arturo Flores Villa | TKO | 2 (10), 0:32 | Jan 18, 2020 | Casino Ejidal, Villa Hidalgo, Mexico | |
| 43 | Win | 36–7 | Marvin Diaz | KO | 5 (10), 0:30 | Dec 7, 2019 | Palenque de la Feria, Tepic, Mexico | |
| 42 | Win | 35–7 | Luis Macias | MD | 10 | Aug 5, 2017 | Arena Jalisco, Guadalajara, Mexico | |
| 41 | Win | 34–7 | Pedro Antonio Rodriguez | SD | 10 | Apr 8, 2017 | Arena Jalisco, Guadalajara, Mexico | |
| 40 | Win | 33–7 | Mauricio Rios | KO | 4 (10), 2:30 | Dec 16, 2016 | Palenque de la Feria, Tepic, Mexico | |
| 39 | Win | 32–7 | Rafael Villalobos | TKO | 2 (8), 2:15 | Nov 5, 2016 | Salón de Eventos Los Fresnos, Tepic, Mexico | |
| 38 | Loss | 31–7 | Juan Hernandez Navarette | TKO | 2 (10), 2:34 | Feb 6, 2016 | Arena Coliseo, Mexico City, Mexico | |
| 37 | Win | 31–6 | Mario Andrade | SD | 8 | Aug 29, 2015 | El Domo, San Luis Patosí, Mexico | |
| 36 | Loss | 30–6 | Hekkie Budler | UD | 12 | Feb 21, 2015 | Monte-Carlo Sporting, Monte Carlo, Monaco | For WBA (Regular) and IBO minimumweight titles |
| 35 | Win | 30–5 | Josue Vega | RTD | 5 (10), 3:00 | Nov 8, 2014 | Auditorio General Arteaga, Querétaro, Mexico | |
| 34 | Win | 29–5 | Eduardo Cruz Munoz | TKO | 3 (8) | Aug 9, 2014 | Auditorio General Arteaga, Querétaro, Mexico | |
| 33 | Loss | 28–5 | Eduardo Martinez | SD | 8 | Apr 12, 2014 | Oasis Hotel Complex, Cancún, Mexicp | |
| 32 | Win | 28–4 | Jesus Reyes Ortiz | UD | 6 | Jan 4, 2014 | Polideportivo Río de Janeiro, Guadalajara, Mexico | |
| 31 | Loss | 27–4 | Ryo Miyazaki | MD | 12 | Sep 11, 2013 | Osaka Prefectural Gymnasium, Osaka, Japan | For WBA (Regular) minimumweight title |
| 30 | Win | 27–3 | Luis Carlos Leon | TKO | 6 (10), 2:05 | Apr 6, 2013 | Unidad Deportiva El Chamizal, Zamora, Mexico | |
| 29 | Win | 26–3 | Takuya Mitamura | TKO | 4 (12), 0:40 | Oct 6, 2012 | Palenque de la Feria, Tepic, Mexico | Retained WBA Interim minimumweight title |
| 28 | Win | 25–3 | Edwin Diaz | UD | 12 | Jul 14, 2012 | Palenque de la Feria, Tepic, Mexico | Won WBA Interim minimumweight title |
| 27 | Win | 24–3 | Marvin Diaz Canales | KO | 2 (8), 1:53 | Apr 14, 2012 | Arandas Municipal Auditorium, Arandas, Mexico | |
| 26 | Loss | 23–3 | Paipharob Kokietgym | UD | 12 | Nov 7, 2011 | Bung Nongkhai, Nong Khai, Thailand | For WBA Interim minimumweight title |
| 25 | Win | 23–2 | Walter Rojas | KO | 2 (9), 0:50 | Aug 6, 2011 | Gimnasio Municipal, Navojoa, Mexico | Retained WBA Fedecentro minimumweight title |
| 24 | Win | 22–2 | Ulises Lara | SD | 9 | Jun 25, 2011 | Domo del Mar, Ciudad del Carmen, Mexico | Won vacant WBA Fedecentro minimumweight title |
| 23 | Win | 21–2 | Oswaldo Novoa | SD | 8 | May 27, 2011 | Arena Jalisco, Guadalajara, Mexico | |
| 22 | Win | 20–2 | Yader Escobar | KO | 3 (12), 2:28 | Feb 5, 2011 | Arena Coliseo, Guadalajara, Mexico | |
| 21 | Win | 19–2 | Irving Garcia | KO | 1 (10) | Dec 4, 2010 | Estadio Universitario Beto Ávila, Veracruz, Mexico | |
| 20 | Win | 18–2 | Moises Eb | TKO | 5 (10), 0:36 | Jul 31, 2010 | Palenque de la Feria, Tepic, Mexico | |
| 19 | Win | 17–2 | Juan Pedro Rodriguez | KO | 2 (4) | Jun 19, 2010 | Mesón de los Deportes, Tepic, Mexico | |
| 18 | Win | 16–2 | Javier Martínez | UD | 10 | Apr 16, 2010 | Tepic, Mexico | |
| 17 | Loss | 15–2 | Donnie Nietes | TKO | 10 (10), 1:37 | Jan 23, 2010 | Cuneta Astrodome, Pasay, Philippines | |
| 16 | Win | 15–1 | Felipe Lopez | KO | 1 (?) | Dec 12, 2009 | Gimnasio INDEJ, Tepic, Mexico | |
| 15 | Win | 14–1 | Eduardo Gonzalez | UD | 10 | Oct 24, 2009 | Plaza Pueblo Antiguo, Ensenada, Mexico | |
| 14 | Win | 13–1 | Hugo Olvera | KO | 3 (8) | Sep 12, 2009 | Palenque de la Feria, Tepic, Mexico | |
| 13 | Win | 12–1 | Raul Garay Carreon | KO | 2 (8) | Jul 25, 2009 | Palenque del Recinto Ferial, Nuevo Vallarta, Mexico | |
| 12 | Win | 11–1 | Carlos Velarde | TKO | 5 (10), 2:31 | Feb 14, 2009 | Gimnasio German Evers, Mazatlán, Mexico | |
| 11 | Win | 10–1 | Julio César Félix | MD | 10 | Nov 15, 2008 | Ciudad Obregón, Mexico | |
| 10 | Win | 9–1 | Charly Valenzuela | KO | 2 (4) | Aug 29, 2008 | Gimnasio German Evers, Mazatlán, Mexico | |
| 9 | Loss | 8–1 | José Alfredo Rodríguez | UD | 6 | Apr 18, 2008 | Gimnasio German Evers, Mazatlán, Mexico | |
| 8 | Win | 8–0 | Doroteo Aguilera | TKO | 5 (6) | Dec 1, 2007 | Tepic, Mexico | |
| 7 | Win | 7–0 | Juan Quiroz | TKO | 2 (?) | Sep 14, 2007 | Tepic, Mexico | |
| 6 | Win | 6–0 | Raul Garay Carreon | KO | 5 (6) | Jun 22, 2007 | Tepic, Mexico | |
| 5 | Win | 5–0 | Noe Alvarez | KO | 2 (4) | Jun 1, 2007 | Salón de Eventos Los Fresnos, Tepic, Mexico | |
| 4 | Win | 4–0 | German Aaron Cota | UD | 4 | Apr 27, 2007 | Tepic, Mexico | |
| 3 | Win | 3–0 | David Solano Salazar | KO | 3 (4) | Mar 2, 2007 | Salón de Eventos Los Fresnos, Tepic, Mexico | |
| 2 | Win | 2–0 | Adrian Lopez | KO | ? (4) | Feb 10, 2007 | Salón de Eventos Los Fresnos, Tepic, Mexico | |
| 1 | Win | 1–0 | Oscar De la Torre | KO | 3 (4) | Dec 14, 2006 | Salón de Eventos Los Fresnos, Tepic, Mexico | |

Sporting positions
Regional boxing titles
| Vacant Title last held by Carlos Buitrago | WBA Fedecentro mini-flyweight champion June 25, 2011 – July 14, 2012; Won interim title | Succeeded by Julio Mendoza |
World boxing titles
| Vacant Title last held by Paipharob Kokietgym | WBA mini-flyweight champion Interim title July 14, 2012 – September 11, 2013; Lost bid for full title | Vacant Title next held by Hekkie Budler |
