= Julio César Félix =

Mexican boxer

Personal information
- Nickname: Gatito
- Born: 11 September 1985 (age 40) Tijuana, Baja California, Mexico
- Weight: Mini flyweight; Light flyweight; Flyweight

Boxing career
- Stance: Orthodox

Boxing record
- Total fights: 23
- Wins: 19
- Win by KO: 8
- Losses: 4

Julio César "Gatito" Félix (born 11 September 1985) is a Mexican former professional boxer, who competed from 2007 to 2013. He challenged for the WBO mini flyweight title in 2012.

== Professional career ==
On 2 June 2012, Félix was defeated by Moisés Fuentes, via first-round knockout for the WBO mini flyweight title.

== Professional boxing record ==
23 fights	19 wins	4 losses
By knockout	8	3
By decision	11	1

No.	Result	Record	Opponent	Type	Round, time	Date	Location	Notes
23	Win	19–4	(Mexico) Jose Noe Figueroa	TKO	5 (6), 2:05	27 Sep 2013	Caliente Racetrack, Tijuana, Mexico	
22	Win	18–4	(Mexico) Jose Medina Mora	UD	8	28 Nov 2012	Salon Las Pulgas, Tijuana, Mexico	
21	Loss	17–4	(Mexico) Moisés Fuentes	KO	1 (12), 2:16	2 Jun 2012	El Foro, Tijuana, Mexico	For WBO mini flyweight title
20	Win	17–3	(Mexico) Cristian Aguilar Galaz	KO	3 (8), 1:34	16 Feb 2012	Salon Las Pulgas, Tijuana, Mexico	
19	Win	16–3	(Mexico) Sergio Nunez	SD	10	29 Sep 2011	Salon Las Pulgas, Tijuana, Mexico	
18	Win	15–3	(Mexico) Patricio Camacho Valdez	TKO	1 (6)	25 Oct 2010	El Foro, Tijuana, Mexico	
17	Win	14–3	(Mexico) Ricardo Armenta	UD	6	28 Aug 2010	Auditorio Fausto Gutierrez Moreno, Tijuana, Mexico	
16	Win	13–3	(Mexico) Jesus Valenzuela Rodriguez	TKO	2 (4), 1:55	24 Jul 2010	Caliente Racetrack, Tijuana, Mexico	
15	Win	12–3	(Mexico) Javier Franco	UD	8	28 May 2010	Gimnasio Oscar 'Tigre' García, Ensenada, Mexico	
14	Loss	11–3	(Mexico) Manuel Jimenez	KO	1 (?)	12 Sep 2009	Ensenada, Mexico	
13	Win	11–2	(Mexico) Felipe Rivas	MD	10	14 Mar 2009	Estadio Francisco Carranza Limón, Guasave, Mexico	
12	Win	10–2	(Mexico) Francisco Rodriguez	TKO	4 (8), 2:54	20 Dec 2008	El Foro, Tijuana, Mexico	
11	Loss	9–2	(Mexico) Jesús Silvestre	MD	10	15 Nov 2008	Ciudad Obregón, Mexico	
10	Win	9–1	(Nicaragua) Milton Marin	UD	10	2 Aug 2008	Avenida Revolución, Tijuana, Mexico	
9	Win	8–1	(Mexico) Mario Rodríguez	MD	4	14 Apr 2008	Auditorio Fausto Gutierrez Moreno, Tijuana, Mexico	
8	Win	7–1	(Mexico) Armando Vazquez	UD	6	29 Feb 2008	Centro de Espectáculos Promocasa, Mexicali, Mexico	
7	Win	6–1	(Mexico) Noe Alvarez	KO	2 (6), 0:49	23 Nov 2007	Gimnasio Oscar 'Tigre' García, Ensenada, Mexico	
6	Loss	5–1	(Mexico) Osvaldo Razon	KO	4 (6), 1:08	28 Sep 2007	Gimnasio Oscar 'Tigre' García, Ensenada, Mexico	
5	Win	5–0	(Mexico) Javier Nunez	KO	1 (6)	1 Sep 2007	Tijuana, Mexico	
4	Win	4–0	(Mexico) Alejandro Anguiano	TKO	1 (4), 0:46	19 May 2007	Auditorio Benito Juarez, Guadalajara, Mexico	
3	Win	3–0	(Mexico) Jesus Venancio	UD	4	29 Mar 2007	Auditorio Fausto Gutierrez Moreno, Tijuana, Mexico	
2	Win	2–0	(Mexico) German Aaron Cota	UD	4	17 Feb 2007	Palenque de la Expo, Ciudad Obregón, Mexico	
1	Win	1–0	(Mexico) German Aaron Cota	UD	4	29 Jan 2007	Palenque de Hipódromo de Agua Caliente, Tijuana, Mexico	
