= Alexis Díaz (boxer) =

Venezuelan boxer (born 1987)

Personal information
- Nickname: Erguito
- Born: Alexis Junior Díaz Paez; May 7, 1987 (age 39) Machiques, Venezuela
- Height: 5 ft 4 1/2 in (164 cm)
- Weight: Minimumweight; Light flyweight; Flyweight

Boxing career
- Stance: Orthodox

Boxing record
- Total fights: 33
- Wins: 28
- Win by KO: 18
- Losses: 5

Alexis Diaz (born 7 May 1987) is a Venezuelan minimumweight boxer. Diaz defeated Jorle Estrada for the WBA Fedelatin minimumweight title. Diaz is the #4 ranked minimumweight according to the WBA and #10 according to the WBO.

== Professional boxing record ==
33 fights	28 wins	5 losses
By knockout	18	2
By decision	10	3

No.	Result	Record	Opponent	Type	Round, time	Date	Location	Notes
33	Loss	28–5	(France) Anthony Fevrat Rolet	SD	6	15 Dec 2023	Palais des Sports de Gerland, Lyon, France	
32	Loss	28–4	(Spain) Ruben Gil	UD	6	9 Dec 2023	Club Saga Heredia, Málaga, Spain	
31	Loss	28–3	(United States) Jose Nieves	UD	10	23 Aug 2023	Restaurante Burukuka, Santa Marta, Colombia	
30	Win	28–2	(Venezuela) Yenrry Bermudez	UD	8	15 Apr 2023	Cancha Multiple Ramon Leon, Machiques, Venezuela	
29	Win	27–2	(Colombia) Jose Antonio Jimenez	UD	8	20 Aug 2022	Coliseo del Sur, Armenia, Colombia	Won vacant Colombian flyweight title
28	Win	26–2	(Colombia) Smyrk Parra	KO	1 (4), 2:50	29 May 2022	Club Las Margaritas, Melgar, Colombia	
27	Win	25–2	(Venezuela) Yorvis Ramos	RTD	4 (4)	14 Sep 2019	Gimnasio Vertical El Dorado, Caracas, Venezuela	
26	Loss	24–2	(Mexico) José Argumedo	TKO	5 (12), 0:51	9 Mar 2019	Centro de Convenciones, Tamazula, Mexico	
25	Win	24–1	(Venezuela) Johan Flores	UD	8	14 Jul 2018	Gimnasio Mocho Navas, Petare, Venezuela	
24	Win	23–1	(Colombia) Luis de la Rosa	RTD	1 (8), 3:00	28 Oct 2017	Casino Caribe, Medellín, Colombia	
23	Win	22–1	(Venezuela) Luis Alberto Zarraga	TKO	5 (6), 2:08	29 Sep 2017	San Juan de los Morros, Venezuela	
22	Win	21–1	(Venezuela) Vicente Mirabal	RTD	3 (10), 3:00	11 Mar 2017	Centro Recreacional Yesterday, Turmero, Venezuela	
21	Win	20–1	(Venezuela) Nerio Molero	KO	2 (4), 2:50	17 Sep 2016	Club Central Familiar El Cruce, Machiques, Venezuela	
20	Win	19–1	(Venezuela) José Luis Varela	KO	2 (8), 2:44	4 Jun 2016	Centro Recreacional Yesterday, Turmero, Venezuela	
19	Win	18–1	(Venezuela) Freddy Beleno	UD	10	14 Nov 2015	Polideportivo Barrio Carmelo Urdaneta, Maracaibo, Venezuela	Retained Venezuelan flyweight title
18	Win	17–1	(Venezuela) Argenis Cheremo	KO	7 (10), 2:45	12 Sep 2015	Plaza El Urbanismo, Caracas, Venezuela	Won vacant Venezuelan flyweight title
17	Loss	16–1	(Thailand) Knockout CP Freshmart	TKO	4 (12), 2:45	2 Jul 2015	City Hall Ground, Nakhon Ratchasima, Thailand	For WBA interim minimumweight title
16	Win	16–0	(Colombia) Luis de la Rosa	TKO	1 (11), 2:58	24 Oct 2014	Coliseo Universidad del Norte, Barranquilla, Colombia	Retained WBA Fedelatin minimumweight title
15	Win	15–0	(Mexico) Armando Vazquez	UD	11	30 Aug 2014	Parque Nacionales Unidas, Caracas, Venezuela	Retained WBA Fedelatin minimumweight title
14	Win	14–0	(Venezuela) Nelson Magallanes	TKO	3 (8), 2:14	4 Jul 2014	El Velódromo Teo Capriles, Caracas, Venezuela	
13	Win	13–0	(Colombia) Jorle Estrada	RTD	5 (11), 3:00	10 May 2014	Polideportivo José María Vargas, La Guaira, Venezuela	Won vacant WBA Fedelatin minimumweight title
12	Win	12–0	(Venezuela) Argenis Cheremo	KO	2 (10), 2:52	15 Feb 2014	Gimnasio de Uso Multiple de La Concepcion, Maracaibo, Venezuela	
11	Win	11–0	(Colombia) Eris Juez	TKO	3 (8)	30 Nov 2013	Gimnasio Cubierto La Concepcion, Maracaibo, Venezuela	
10	Win	10–0	(Venezuela) Darwin Zambrano	KO	2 (10), 2:00	20 Sep 2013	Complejo Ferial, Machiques, Venezuela	Won Venezuelan flyweight title
9	Win	9–0	(Colombia) Farid Cassiani	KO	3 (10)	12 Jul 2013	Complejo Ferial, Machiques, Venezuela	
8	Win	8–0	(Panama) Carlos Melo	UD	6	5 Apr 2013	Club Nautico Caribe, Colón, Panama	
7	Win	7–0	(Colombia) Nelson Cantero	UD	6	9 Mar 2013	Coliseo Mario de León, Cereté, Colombia	
6	Win	6–0	(Colombia) Ronald Ramos	UD	6	30 Nov 2012	Hotel Prado Mar, Puerto Colombia, Colombia	
5	Win	5–0	(Venezuela) Yenrry Bermudez	UD	8	14 Jul 2012	Polideportivo José María Vargas, La Guaira, Venezuela	
4	Win	4–0	(Colombia) Jorli Estrada	KO	1 (6)	28 Apr 2012	Coliseo El Limon, Maracay, Venezuela	
3	Win	3–0	(Colombia) Gabriel Filot	TKO	2 (6), 1:40	21 Oct 2011	Centro Recreacional Las Vegas, Barranquilla, Colombia	
2	Win	2–0	(Venezuela) Argenis Cheremo	UD	4	20 Aug 2011	Estadio Roman Antonio Gutierrez, Machiques, Venezuela	
1	Win	1–0	(Venezuela) Luis Duarte	KO	2 (4), 1:50	18 Jun 2011	Club Social Los Leones, Barcelona, Venezuela	
