= Donnie Nietes =

Filipino boxer (born 1982)

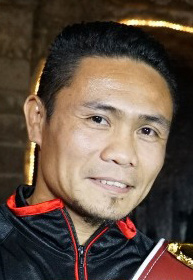
- Nietes in 2019

Personal information
- Nickname: Ahas (Snake)
- Born: Donnie Liboon Nietes; May 12, 1982 (age 44) Murcia, Negros Occidental, Philippines
- Height: 5 ft 3 in (160 cm)
- Weight: Mini-flyweight; Junior-flyweight; Flyweight; Junior-bantamweight

Boxing career
- Reach: 65 1/2 in (166 cm)
- Stance: Orthodox

Boxing record
- Total fights: 53
- Wins: 44
- Win by KO: 23
- Losses: 3
- Draws: 6

Donnie Liboon Nietes (born May 12, 1982) is a Filipino professional boxer who has won world titles in four weight-classes, having previously held the World Boxing Organization (WBO) mini-flyweight title from 2007 to 2011; the WBO and The Ring magazine junior-flyweight titles between 2011 and 2016, the International Boxing Federation (IBF) flyweight title from 2017 to 2018; and the WBO junior-bantamweight title from 2018 to 2019. He is the longest-reigning Filipino boxing world champion, surpassing in 2014 the record set in 1967 by Boxing Hall of Fame inductee Gabriel "Flash" Elorde. He was one of the first three Asian fighters with world titles in at least four weight classes alongside fellow Filipinos Manny Pacquiao and Nonito Donaire.

== Nickname ==
Regarding how Nietes got his nickname "Ahas" which is Tagalog for "snake," Tony Aldeguer states:

"Donnie got his nickname 'ahas' when he was a utility boy at the ALA Gym. One of his daily chores was to clean the snake pit with five big pythons and he was the only man with the guts to do it. He was bitten several times. But once he befriended the snakes, he was never bitten again. One day, a snake laid 11 eggs but only one survived. Donnie took care of that snake and he still does to this day. That's how he got his nickname."

— Tony Aldeguer, quoted from an interview

== Professional career ==
=== Early years ===
Nietes worked as a utility man at the now-disbanded Antonio Lopez Aldeguer's (ALA) boxing gym before taking up boxing after being encouraged by the practitioners with whom he socialized.

In 2003, at the age of 20, Nietes started his career as a professional boxer. On, May 22, 2004, he won the Philippines Boxing Federation (PBF) light flyweight title against Joseph Villasis via first-round technical knockout. Nietes was undefeated before losing in his bout against Angky Angkota via 10-round split decision on September 28, 2004. Angkota weighed in six pounds over the weight limit for this fight.

On November 24, 2006, Nietes won the vacant WBO Asia Pacific Minimumweight Title against Heri Amol of Indonesia via second-round knockout. He defended the title twice against Thai boxers Thongthailek Sor Tanapinyo and Sakulpan Pakdee Gym prior to world title fights in minimumweight division.

=== Minimumweight ===
On September 30, 2007, Nietes fought then undefeated Pornsawarn Kratingdaenggym of Thailand for the vacant WBO Minimumweight World Title in Waterfront-Cebu City Hotel, Cebu City, Philippines. Although Nietes floored Kratingdaenggym in the fourth round, the Thai boxer managed to get up and last until the final bell. The bout ended in a unanimous decision in favor of Nietes.

Three times, Nietes has been pitted with fighters against whom he was supposed to defend his title, however, all plans have fallen through for undisclosed reasons. Because of this, he was at risk of being stripped off his belt, as WBO rules state that a champion has to defend his title within a year. After 11 months of inactivity, he finally defended his crown, against Eddy Castro (12–3–1) on August 30, 2008. Nietes (23–1–3, with 14 knockouts) won the fight by technical knockout at 2:49 mark of the second round.

Nietes defended his title for the second time by scoring a unanimous decision victory over Erik Ramirez on February 28, 2009. En route to the win, Nietes sent Ramirez to the canvass four times in separate rounds.

In his third defense, Nietes battled interim champion Manuel Vargas on September 12, 2009. Nietes won the bout by split decision.

On January 23, 2010, Nietes was supposed to defend his WBO title for the fourth time. After a couple of opponents backed out, Mexico's Jesus Silvestre became the last resort. But because Silvestre wasn't ranked in the WBO, Nietes' title wasn't wagered and the bout was only 10 rounds. In the fight, both boxers did well and appeared strong. In the 10th and final round, Nietes was declared winner by TKO when Silvestre stopped to take a drink of water during the fight, a move that was against the rules.

In his fourth title defense, Nietes fought Mexico's Mario Rodriguez. The fight took place on August 14, 2010, at the Auditorio Luis Estrada Medina in Guasave, Sinaloa, Mexico. The Filipino pugilist won the bout by unanimous decision with scores of 119–109, 118-110 and 116–112.

Nietes was scheduled to defend his title on March 12, 2011, against mandatory challenger and former champion Raul Garcia (29–1–0). However, less than two weeks before the fight, Nietes announced that he would be vacating his world title and moving up in weight. On April 9, 2011, Nietes faced Armando Vazquez (18–5–0) and defeated him via first round knock out.

=== Light flyweight ===
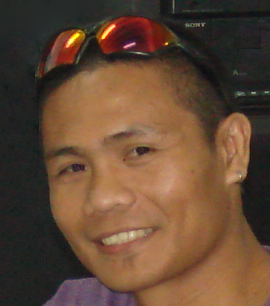
Donnie Nietes 2012

On October 8, 2011, Nietes defeated Mexico's Ramón García Hirales via 12-round unanimous decision to win the WBO Light Flyweight title. Nietes defended the title on June 2, 2012, against Felipe Salguero via unanimous decision.

Nietes retained his WBO Light Flyweight title against WBO Minimumweight champion Moises Fuentes on March 2, 2013, via a majority draw.

On November 15, 2014, the Bacolod native successfully defended his WBO and The Ring Light Flyweight titles by stopping Carlos Velarde of Mexico in the 7th round. Nietes became the longest-reigning Filipino world champion on that same day, surpassing the record previously held by Gabriel Elorde.

=== Flyweight ===
After breaking Elorde's record, Nietes successfully defended his title four more times before deciding to move up to the flyweight division. His first flyweight fight was against former WBC light flyweight champion Edgar Sosa on September 24, 2016. On April 29, 2017, Nietes became the third Filipino boxer to win world titles in three different weight divisions, along with Manny Pacquiao and Nonito Donaire when he defeated Thailand's Komgrich Nantapech. He successfully defended his title against the mandatory challenger Argentinaian and former two division world champion Juan Carlos Reveco winning via Technical Knockout after Reveco's corner throws in the towel, on the 7th round of the fight. On June 14, 2018, Nietes entered The Ring magazine's pound for pound list for the first time in his career at the number nine spot.

=== Junior bantamweight ===
Nietes made his debut in the junior-bantamweight division against Filipino compatriot Aston Palicte for the vacant WBO Super Flyweight Championship. The fight ended in a split decision draw, 118-110 for Nietes, 116-112 for Palicte and a 114–114 draw at The Forum in Inglewood, California. Punch count statistics saw Nietes, 36, land 194 punches, 70 more than Palicte, his 40 percent of punches landed was nearly twice the accuracy rate of his rival. While not beaten, Nietes was denied a victory that would have put him alongside Manny Pacquiao and Nonito Donaire as the only Asian fighters with world titles in at least four weight classes. He eventually won the same vacant title after defeating Kazuto Ioka via split decision on December 21, 2018, becoming the third Asian to win world titles in at least four weight classes.

On February 6, 2019, the WBO ordered a rematch of Nietes and Palicte after a controversial result of their first fight. On February 28, 2019, Nietes decided to vacate his WBO Junior Bantamweight title to pursue more lucrative fights in a different organization or weight class.

On April 3, 2021, Nietes fought Pablo Carillo, for the vacant WBO International junior-bantamweight title. Nietes won via unanimous decision, the scorecards were, 99–91, 98-92 and 96–95. On December 11, 2021, Nietes made his first title defense against Norbelto Jimenez at the Coca-Cola Arena, Dubai, United Arab Emirates. The fight ended in a ten-round split decision draw. The scores were 96-94 Nietes, 96-94 Jimenez and 95-95 and Nietes was able to retain his WBO International junior-bantamweight title.

On April 1, 2022, the WBO ordered Kazuto Ioka to make a mandatory title defense against Nietes. The bout was a rematch of their December 31, 2018 fight, in which Nietes won by split decision. Both parties came to an agreement a month later, and officially announced the bout for July 13, 2022. Nietes lost the fight by unanimous decision, with scores of 120–108, 118–110 and 117–111.

=== Bantamweight ===
Nietes is set to face Muhammad Waseem on July 22, 2023, in Dubai for the vacant IBO bantamweight world title. The fight has been postponed due to visa issue by Waseem's team.

== Professional boxing record ==
53 fights	44 wins	3 losses
By knockout	23	0
By decision	21	3
Draws	6	

No.	Result	Record	Opponent	Type	Round, time	Date	Location	Notes
53	Loss	44–3–6	Jun Ikegawa	UD	6	May 20, 2025	Korakuen Hall, Tokyo, Japan	
52	Win	44–2–6	Miller Alapormina	UD	6	Apr 10, 2025	The Flash Grand Ballroom of the Elorde Sports Complex, Parañaque, Philippines	
51	Loss	43–2–6	Kazuto Ioka	UD	12	Jul 13, 2022	Ota City General Gymnasium, Ōta, Tokyo, Japan	For WBO junior-bantamweight title
50	Draw	43–1–6	Norbelto Jimenez	SD	10	Dec 11, 2021	Coca-Cola Arena, Dubai, UAE	Retained WBO International junior-bantamweight title
49	Win	43–1–5	Pablo Carillo	UD	10	Apr 3, 2021	The Rotunda Caesars Palace Bluewaters, Dubai, UAE	Won vacant WBO International junior-bantamweight title
48	Win	42–1–5	Kazuto Ioka	SD	12	Dec 31, 2018	Wynn Palace, Macau, SAR	Won vacant WBO junior-bantamweight title
47	Draw	41–1–5	Aston Palicte	SD	12	Sep 8, 2018	The Forum, Inglewood, California, U.S.	For vacant WBO junior-bantamweight title
46	Win	41–1–4	Juan Carlos Reveco	TKO	7 (12), 0:53	Feb 24, 2018	The Forum, Inglewood, California, U.S.	Retained IBF flyweight title
45	Win	40–1–4	Komgrich Nantapech	UD	12	Apr 29, 2017	Waterfront Hotel & Casino, Cebu City, Philippines	Won vacant IBF flyweight title
44	Win	39–1–4	Edgar Sosa	UD	12	Sep 24, 2016	StubHub Center, Carson, California, U.S.	Won vacant WBO Inter-Continental flyweight title
43	Win	38–1–4	Raul Garcia	RTD	5 (12), 3:00	May 28, 2016	La Salle Coliseum, Bacolod, Philippines	Retained WBO and The Ring junior-flyweight titles
42	Win	37–1–4	Juan Alejo	UD	12	Oct 17, 2015	StubHub Center, Carson, California, U.S.	Retained WBO and The Ring junior-flyweight titles
41	Win	36–1–4	Francisco Rodríguez Jr.	UD	12	Jul 11, 2015	Waterfront Hotel & Casino, Cebu City, Philippines	Retained WBO and The Ring junior-flyweight titles
40	Win	35–1–4	Gilberto Parra	RTD	9 (12), 3:00	Mar 28, 2015	Smart Araneta Coliseum, Quezon City, Philippines	Retained WBO and The Ring junior-flyweight titles
39	Win	34–1–4	Carlos Velarde	RTD	7 (12), 3:00	Nov 15, 2014	Waterfront Hotel & Casino, Cebu City, Philippines	Retained WBO and The Ring junior-flyweight titles
38	Win	33–1–4	Moisés Fuentes	TKO	9 (12), 2:56	May 10, 2014	Mall of Asia Arena, Pasay, Philippines	Retained WBO junior-flyweight title; Won vacant The Ring junior-flyweight title
37	Win	32–1–4	Sammy Gutiérrez	TKO	3 (12), 2:58	Nov 30, 2013	Smart Araneta Coliseum, Quezon City, Philippines	Retained WBO junior-flyweight title
36	Draw	31–1–4	Moisés Fuentes	MD	12	Mar 2, 2013	Waterfront Hotel & Casino, Cebu City, Philippines	Retained WBO junior-flyweight title
35	Win	31–1–3	Danai Meendaeng	KO	5 (12), 2:46	Nov 17, 2012	Lamberto Macias Sports Complex, Dumaguete, Philippines	
34	Win	30–1–3	Felipe Salguero	UD	12	Jun 2, 2012	Resorts World Manila, Pasay, Philippines	Retained WBO junior-flyweight title
33	Win	29–1–3	Ramón García Hirales	UD	12	Oct 8, 2011	La Salle Coliseum, Bacolod, Philippines	Won WBO junior-flyweight title
32	Win	28–1–3	Armando Vazquez	KO	1 (10), 2:26	Apr 9, 2011	La Salle Coliseum, Bacolod, Philippines	
31	Win	27–1–3	Mario Rodríguez	UD	12	Aug 14, 2010	Auditorio Luis Estrada Medina, Guasave, Mexico	Retained WBO mini-flyweight title
30	Win	26–1–3	Jesús Silvestre	TKO	10 (10), 1:37	Jan 23, 2010	Cuneta Astrodome, Pasay, Philippines	
29	Win	25–1–3	Manuel Vargas	SD	12	Sep 12, 2009	El Palenque de la Feria, Tepic, Mexico	Retained WBO mini-flyweight title
28	Win	24–1–3	Erik Ramirez	UD	12	Feb 28, 2009	Auditorio Guelaguetza, Oaxaca, Mexico	Retained WBO mini-flyweight title
27	Win	23–1–3	Eddy Castro	KO	2 (12), 2:49	Aug 30, 2008	Waterfront Hotel & Casino, Cebu City, Philippines	Retained WBO mini-flyweight title
26	Win	22–1–3	Pornsawan Porpramook	UD	12	Sep 30, 2007	Waterfront Hotel & Casino, Cebu City, Philippines	Won vacant WBO mini-flyweight title
25	Win	21–1–3	Saengpetch Sor Sakulphan	TKO	7 (12), 0:36	Jul 7, 2007	Waterfront Hotel & Casino, Cebu City, Philippines	Retained WBO Asia Pacific mini-flyweight title
24	Win	20–1–3	Thongthailek Sor Tanapinyo	KO	2 (12), 1:10	Apr 21, 2007	New City Coliseum, Victorias, Philippines	Retained WBO Asia Pacific mini-flyweight title
23	Win	19–1–3	Heri Amol	KO	2 (12), 0:46	Nov 24, 2006	Sports & Cultural Complex, Mandaue City, Philippines	Won vacant WBO Asia Pacific mini-flyweight title
22	Win	18–1–3	Robert Rubillar	UD	10	Aug 12, 2006	Sports Complex, Minglanilla, Philippines	
21	Win	17–1–3	Noel Veronque	UD	6	Jan 15, 2006	Gaisano Country Mall Parking Lot, Cebu City, Philippines	
20	Win	16–1–3	Allan Dugang	UD	8	Dec 30, 2005	CPG Multi-Purpose Center, Talibon, Philippines	
19	Win	15–1–3	Randy Narbay	KO	2 (8), 1:29	Sep 25, 2005	Island City Mall, Tagbilaran, Philippines	
18	Win	14–1–3	Allan Dugang	UD	10	Aug 28, 2005	Town Plaza, Panglao, Philippines	
17	Draw	13–1–3	Nino Suelo	TD	1 (8), 1:26	Jul 30, 2005	San Andres Civic & Sports Center, Manila, Philippines	
16	Win	13–1–2	Elmer Muyco	UD	10	Apr 30, 2005	Sports & Cultural Complex, Mandaue City, Philippines	
15	Win	12–1–2	Ricardo Albia	TKO	7 (8), 1:06	Jan 29, 2005	Sports & Cultural Complex, Mandaue City, Philippines	
14	Draw	11–1–2	Carlo Besares	MD	10	Nov 20, 2004	University of Mindanao Gymnasium, Tagum, Philippines	
13	Loss	11–1–1	Angky Angkota	SD	10	Sep 28, 2004	RCTI Studios, Jakarta, Indonesia	
12	Win	11–0–1	Abrin Matta	TKO	5 (10)	Sep 7, 2004	BIN Arena, Jakarta, Indonesia	
11	Win	10–0–1	Marti Polii	TKO	7 (10), 2:15	Aug 3, 2004	RCTI Studios, Jakarta, Indonesia	
10	Win	9–0–1	Robert Costelo	TKO	1 (10), 1:58	Jun 29, 2004	Gaisano Country Mall Parking Lot, Cebu City, Philippines	Retained PBF junior-flyweight title
9	Win	8–0–1	Joseph Villasis	TKO	1 (10), 1:16	May 22, 2004	Ynares Sr. Memorial Gym, Binangonan, Philippines	Won vacant PBF junior-flyweight title
8	Win	7–0–1	Robert Rubillar	TKO	7 (10), 1:22	Mar 28, 2004	Ynares Sr. Memorial Gym, Binangonan, Philippines	
7	Win	6–0–1	Julius Alcos	SD	10	Feb 28, 2004	Sports & Cultural Complex, Mandaue City, Philippines	
6	Win	5–0–1	Rolando Baclayo	KO	4 (10), 2:40	Dec 27, 2003	Sports Complex, Danao, Cebu, Philippines	
5	Win	4–0–1	Roldan Malinao	KO	4 (8), 2:30	Oct 4, 2003	Sports & Cultural Complex, Mandaue City, Philippines	
4	Draw	3–0–1	Greg Mangan	MD	8	Aug 16, 2003	New Coliseum, Cebu City, Philippines	
3	Win	3–0	Rommel Tura	TKO	1 (8), 2:57	Jun 12, 2003	Gaisano Country Mall Parking Lot, Cebu City, Philippines	
2	Win	2–0	Mario Jun de Asis	UD	6	May 31, 2003	Town Plaza, Catmon, Philippines	
1	Win	1–0	Walter Suaybaguio	UD	6	Apr 25, 2003	Barangay Pitalo, San Fernando, Philippines	

== Titles in boxing ==
=== Major world titles ===
- WBO mini flyweight champion (105 lbs)
- WBO junior flyweight champion (108 lbs)
- IBF flyweight champion (112 lbs)
- WBO junior bantamweight champion (115 lbs)

=== The Ring magazine titles ===
- The Ring junior flyweight champion (108 lbs)

=== Regional/International titles ===
- WBO Asia Pacific mini flyweight champion (105 lbs)
- PBF light flyweight champion (108 lbs)
- WBO Inter-Continental flyweight champion (112 lbs)
- WBO International junior bantamweight champion (115 lbs)

=== Honorary titles ===
- WBO Super Champion

== Awards and recognition ==
- 2015 Philippine Sportswriters Association (PSA) Sportsman of the Year
- 2014, 2015, 2016 and 2017 Gabriel "Flash" Elorde Memorial Boxer of the Year

== Legacy ==
A statue of Nietes was built in Murcia, Negros Occidental.

== See also ==
- List of Filipino boxing world champions
- List of IBF world champions
- List of WBO world champions
- List of The Ring world champions
- List of mini-flyweight boxing champions
- List of light-flyweight boxing champions
- List of flyweight boxing champions
- List of super-flyweight boxing champions
- List of boxing quadruple champions

Sporting positions
Regional boxing titles
Vacant Title last held by Bert Batawang	Philippine Boxing Federation junior-flyweight champion May 22, 2004 – July 2004; Vacated	Vacant Title next held by Larry Mede
Vacant Title last held by Benjie Sorolla	WBO Asia Pacific mini-flyweight champion November 24, 2006 – September 30, 2007; Won world title	Vacant Title next held by Milan Melindo
Vacant Title last held by Froilan Saludar	WBO Inter-Continental flyweight champion September 24, 2016 – April 29, 2017; Vacated	Vacant Title next held by Paddy Barnes
World boxing titles
Vacant Title last held by Iván Calderón	WBO mini-flyweight champion September 30, 2007 – February 28, 2011; Vacated	Succeeded by Raúl García promoted from interim status
Preceded by Ramón García Hirales	WBO junior-flyweight champion October 8, 2011 – August 3, 2016; Vacated	Vacant Title next held by Kosei Tanaka
Vacant Title last held by Giovani Segura	The Ring junior-flyweight champion May 10, 2014 – August 3, 2016; Vacated	Vacant Title next held by Ryoichi Taguchi
Vacant Title last held by Johnriel Casimero	IBF flyweight champion April 29, 2017 – April 11, 2018; Vacated	Vacant Title next held by Moruti Mthalane
Vacant Title last held by Naoya Inoue	WBO junior-bantamweight champion December 31, 2018 – February 28, 2019; Vacated	Vacant Title next held by Kazuto Ioka
