= Javier Martínez (Mexican boxer) =

Mexican boxer (born 1986)

Javier Martínez Resendiz
Personal information
- Nickname: El Demonio
- Born: 19 August 1986 (age 39) Mexico City, Mexico
- Height: 4 ft 11 in (150 cm)
- Weight: Mini flyweight; Light flyweight

Boxing career
- Stance: Orthodox

Boxing record
- Total fights: 25
- Wins: 17
- Win by KO: 7
- Losses: 6
- Draws: 2

Javier Martínez Resendiz (born 19 August 1986) is a Mexican former professional boxer who competed from 2005 to 2017. He challenged for the WBC strawweight title in 2012 and at regional level held the WBC International Silver strawweight title in 2012.

== Professional career ==
Martínez is scheduled to face old amateur rival Troy Isley at Fontainebleau Las Vegas on June 21, 2024.

== Professional boxing record ==
25 fights	17 wins	6 losses
By knockout	7	2
By decision	10	4
Draws	2	

No.	Result	Record	Opponent	Type	Round, time	Date	Location	Notes
25	Win	17–6–2	Diego Luis Pichardo Liriano	UD	4	29 Apr 2017	Sociedad de Fomento Fernando Hidalgo, Buenos Aires, Argentina	
24	Win	16–6–2	Giampier Quinones	TKO	3 (6), 1:55	23 Dec 2016	Club Social y Deportivo Los Gauchitos, Villa Fiorito, Argentina	
23	Win	15–6–2	Jorge Saquinga	UD	12	27 Aug 2016	Club Unión Casildense, Casilda, Argentina	
22	Win	14–6–2	Washington Manuel Armas	UD	4	23 Apr 2016	Club Alumni, Casilda, Argentina	
21	Loss	13–6–2	José Argumedo	TKO	3 (12), 2:10	18 Oct 2013	Palenque de la Feria, Tepic, Mexico	
20	Loss	13–5–2	Oswaldo Novoa	TKO	4 (10), 2:07	2 Mar 2013	Gimnasio de las Liebres, Río Bravo, Mexico	
19	Loss	13–4–2	Xiong Chaozhong	UD	12	24 Nov 2012	Kunming City Stadium, Kunming, China	For vacant WBC mini flyweight title
18	Win	13–3–2	Ulises Lara	KO	5 (12), 0:48	7 Apr 2012	Gimnasio Carlos Zárate, Cuautla, Mexico	Won vacant WBC International Silver mini flyweight title
17	Win	12–3–2	Job Solano	UD	12	23 Sep 2011	Salon Marbet Plus, Ciudad Nezahualcóyotl, Mexico	Retained Mexican mini flyweight title
16	Win	11–3–2	Armando Vazquez	TKO	6 (12), 2:49	9 Jul 2011	Gimnasio Carlos Zárate, Cuautla, Mexico	Won vacant Mexican mini flyweight title
15	Win	10–3–2	Reynaldo Avila	TKO	2 (8)	5 May 2011	Jose Cuervo Salon, Mexico City, Mexico	
14	Win	9–3–2	Luis Manuel Ramos	UD	8	18 Feb 2011	Gimnasio Carlos Zárate, Cuautla, Mexico	
13	Loss	8–3–2	Jesús Silvestre	UD	10	16 Apr 2010	Tepic, Mexico	
12	Draw	8–2–2	Luis Ceja	PTS	6	29 Nov 2008	Arena México, Mexico City, Mexico	
11	Win	8–2–1	Oswaldo Fuentes	UD	6	13 Aug 2008	Foro Scotiabank, Mexico City, Mexico	
10	Loss	7–2–1	Osvaldo Razon	UD	6	14 Jun 2008	Palacio de los Deportes, Mexico City, Mexico	
9	Win	7–1–1	Salvador Cruz Martinez	KO	3 (6)	9 May 2008	Arena Azteca Budokan, Ciudad Nezahualcóyotl, Mexico	
8	Loss	6–1–1	Hector Hernandez	SD	6	20 Oct 2007	Salón Gran Fórum, Mexico City, Mexico	
7	Draw	6–0–1	Jesus Sanchez	PTS	6	26 Aug 2006	Unidad Deportiva Acapulco, Acapulco, Mexico	
6	Win	6–0	Samuel Garcia	TKO	6 (6)	9 Jun 2006	Deportivo Plan Sexenal, Mexico City, Mexico	
5	Win	5–0	Samuel Garcia	SD	6	14 Dec 2005	Salon Emperador, Iztacalco, Mexico	
4	Win	4–0	Pascasio Zarate	UD	4	20 Jul 2005	Salon 21, Mexico City, Mexico	
3	Win	3–0	Alonso Alberto Hernandez	SD	4	2 Jun 2005	Salon 21, Mexico City, Mexico	Cinturón de Oro XI: mini flyweight final
2	Win	2–0	Marcelo Gerardo Lopez	UD	4	5 May 2005	Salon 21, Mexico City, Mexico	Cinturón de Oro XI: mini flyweight semi-final
1	Win	1–0	Salvador Cruz Martinez	TKO	1 (4), 1:35	17 Mar 2005	Salon 21, Mexico City, Mexico	Cinturón de Oro XI: mini flyweight quarter-final
