= Mario Rodríguez (boxer) =

Mexican boxer (born 1988)

Mario Rodriguez
Personal information
- Nickname: Dragoncito
- Born: Mario Rodriguez Meza; 6 October 1988 (age 38) Guasave, Sinaloa, Mexico
- Height: 5 ft 1 in (155 cm)
- Weight: Mini flyweight; Light flyweight; Flyweight

Boxing career
- Reach: 61 in (155 cm)
- Stance: Orthodox

Boxing record
- Total fights: 46
- Wins: 23
- Win by KO: 15
- Losses: 18
- Draws: 5

Mario Rodríguez (born 6 October 1988) is a Mexican former professional boxer who has held the IBF mini flyweight title from September 2012 until March 2013. He is also the first world boxing champion from the city of Guasave.

== Professional career ==
In July 2011, Rodríguez won a ten-round unanimous decision over undefeated Mexican, Manuel Jiménez to win the interim NABF Strawweight Championship.

=== IBF Strawweight Championship ===
On 1 September 2012 Rodríguez upset the undefeated Nkosinathi Joyi to capture the IBF strawweight title. This bout was held at the Auditorio Benito Juárez, in Guadalajara, Mexico.

Rodríguez retired in June 2019 following the shooting death of his trainer and became a trainer himself. After his boxing gym was shut down during the COVID-19 pandemic, he began working as a barber.

== Professional boxing record ==
46 fights	23 wins	18 losses
By knockout	15	1
By decision	8	17
Draws	5	

No.	Result	Record	Opponent	Type	Round, time	Date	Location	Notes
46	Loss	23-18-5	(Mexico) Edwin Saul Garcia	UD	10	2019-06-08	(Mexico) Auditorio Municipal de Cabo San Lucas, Los Cabos	
45	Loss	23-17-5	(Mexico) Bryan Mosinos	UD	10	2019-04-12	(Mexico) Los Mochis	For WBC Continental flyweight title
44	Loss	23-16-5	(Mexico) Elwin Soto	UD	8	2018-07-28	(Mexico) Auditorio Municipal, Tijuana, Baja California	
43	Win	23-15-5	(Mexico) Daniel Arredondo	TKO	2 (6)	2018-05-25	(Mexico) Club Gallistico Corona, Guasave, Sinaloa	
42	Win	22-15-5	(Mexico) Alejandro Alarcon	TKO	1 (6)	2018-03-17	(Mexico) Club Gallistico Corona, Guasave, Sinaloa	
41	Loss	21-15-5	(Mexico) Luis Castillo	UD	10	2018-03-02	(Mexico) Polideportivo Centenario, Los Mochis, Sinaloa	
40	Win	21-14-5	(Mexico) Felix Rubio	TKO	1 (6)	2017-11-20	(Mexico) El Catego, Culiacán, Sinaloa	
39	Loss	20-14-5	(Mexico) Moisés Calleros	UD	8	2017-08-12	(Mexico) Gimnasio Nuevo León Unido, Monterrey, Nuevo León	
38	Win	20-13-5	(Mexico) Jonathan Valdenegro	UD	10	2017-03-31	(Mexico) Club Gallistico Corona, Guasave, Sinaloa	
37	Loss	19-13-5	(Mexico) Gilberto Parra Medina	SD	10	2017-02-18	(Mexico) Gimnasio Municipal, Guaymas, Sonora	
36	Draw	19-12-5	(Mexico) Jose Manuel Sanchez	SD	8	2016-12-03	(Mexico) Polideportivo Centenario, Los Mochis, Sinaloa	
35	Loss	19-12-4	(Mexico) Moisés Calleros	UD	8	2016-07-30	(Mexico) Auditorio Municipal, Tijuana, Baja California	
34	Loss	19-11-4	(Mexico) Hector Gabriel Flores	UD	10	2015-08-08	(Mexico) Auditorio Municipal, Tijuana, Baja California	
33	Loss	19-10-4	(Nicaragua) Carlos Buitrago	UD	10	2015-03-21	(Mexico) Palenque Feria Mesoamericana, Tapachula, Chiapas	For vacant NABA mini flyweight title
32	Win	19-9-4	(Mexico) Armando Torres	TKO	5 (10)	2015-01-10	(Mexico) Auditorio Municipal, Tijuana, Baja California	
31	Win	18-9-4	(Mexico) Junior Granados	UD	10	2014-07-26	(Mexico) Auditorio Municipal, Tapachula, Chiapas	
30	Win	17-9-4	(Mexico) Josue Portales	UD	8	2014-04-26	(Mexico) Centro Convenciones, Puerto Penasco, Sonora	
29	Loss	16-9-4	(Mexico) Ganigan López	UD	12	2014-01-04	(Mexico) Polideportivo Río de Janeiro, Guadalajara, Jalisco	For WBC Continental light flyweight title
28	Win	16-8-4	(Mexico) Odilon Zaleta	SD	10	2013-09-21	(Mexico) Gimnasio Luis Estrada Medina, Guasave, Sinaloa	
27	Loss	15-8-4	(Mexico) Pedro Guevara	UD	12	2013-07-20	(Mexico) Domo de la Colosio, Playa del Carmen, Quintana Roo	For WBC Silver light flyweight title
26	Loss	15-7-4	(Japan) Katsunari Takayama	UD	12	2013-03-30	(Mexico) Estadio Carranza Limón, Guasave, Sinaloa	Lost IBF mini flyweight title
25	Win	15-6-4	(South Africa) Nkosinathi Joyi	KO	7 (12)	2012-09-01	(Mexico) Gimnasio Municipal, Guasave, Sinaloa	Won IBF mini flyweight title
24	Win	14-6-4	(Mexico) Armando Vazquez	KO	4 (10)	2012-06-23	(Mexico) Agua Caliente Casino, Tijuana, Baja California	
23	Win	13-6-4	(Mexico) Gilberto Keb Baas	KO	5 (10)	2012-02-18	(Mexico) Grand Oasis Resort, Cancún, Quintana Roo	
22	Win	12-6-4	(Colombia) Karluis Diaz	KO	1 (12)	2011-10-22	(Mexico) Auditorio Luis Estrada Medina, Guasave, Sinaloa	Retained NABF mini flyweight title
21	Win	11-6-4	(Mexico) Manuel Jiménez	UD	12	2011-07-30	(Mexico) International Center, Mazatlán, Sinaloa	Won vacant NABF mini flyweight title
20	Draw	10-6-4	(Mexico) Pedro Guevara	SD	12	2011-05-28	(Mexico) Centro de Convenciones, Mazatlán, Sinaloa	For WBC Silver light flyweight title
19	Loss	10-6-3	(Philippines) Donnie Nietes	UD	12	2010-08-14	(Mexico) Auditorio Luis Estrada Medina, Guasave, Sinaloa	For WBO mini flyweight title
18	Draw	10-5-3	(Mexico) Rigoberto Casillas	PTS	8	2010-06-19	(Mexico) Gimnasio Municipal, Mexicali, Baja California	
17	Win	10-5-2	(Mexico) German Cota	KO	4 (10)	2010-02-20	(Mexico) Auditorio Ernesto Rufo, Rosarito Beach	
16	Draw	9-5-2	(Mexico) Ivan Meneses	PTS	10	2009-08-21	(Mexico) Gimnasio German Evers, Mazatlán, Sinaloa	
15	Win	9-5-1	(Mexico) Raúl Castañeda	TKO	12 (12)	2009-05-15	(Mexico) Modelo Center, La Paz, Baja California Sur	Won WBC Continental mini flyweight title
14	Win	8-5-1	(Mexico) Francisco López	UD	6	2009-02-06	(Mexico) Auditorio Luis Estrada Medina, Guasave, Sinaloa	
13	Loss	7-5-1	(Mexico) Raúl Castañeda	MD	8	2008-10-31	(Mexico) Cancha Gómez Jiménez, La Paz, Baja California Sur	
12	Win	7-4-1	(Mexico) Orlando Trujillo	KO	2 (6)	2008-10-04	(Mexico) Estadio Carranza Limon, Guasave, Sinaloa	
11	Loss	6-4-1	(Mexico) José Alfredo Rodríguez	UD	8	2008-08-29	(Mexico) Gimnasio German Evers, Mazatlán, Sinaloa	
10	Win	6-3-1	(Mexico) Jesus Hernandez	KO	2 (6)	2008-08-01	(Mexico) Salón Eventos Modelo, Guasave, Sinaloa	
9	Loss	5-3-1	(Mexico) Julio César Félix	MD	4	2008-04-14	(Mexico) Auditorio Municipal, Tijuana, Baja California	
8	Draw	5-2-1	(Mexico) German Cota	TD	2 (6)	2008-03-14	(Mexico) Salón Eventos Modelo, Guasave, Sinaloa	
7	Win	5-2	(Mexico) Charly Valenzuela	UD	6	2008-02-08	(Mexico) Salón Eventos Modelo, Guasave, Sinaloa	
6	Win	4-2	(Mexico) Arnoldo Ochoa	KO	1 (6)	2007-12-14	(Mexico) Salón Eventos Modelo, Guasave, Sinaloa	
5	Win	3-2	(Mexico) Daniel Contreras Jr.	TKO	2 (4)	2007-11-09	(Mexico) Parque Revolución, Culiacán, Sinaloa	
4	Win	2-2	(Mexico) Noe Flores	TKO	2 (4)	2007-09-28	(Mexico) Salón Eventos Modelo, Guasave, Sinaloa	
3	Loss	1-2	(Mexico) David Marquez	SD	4	2007-07-13	(Mexico) Cesar palace, Hermosillo, Sonora	
2	Win	1-1	(Mexico) Geovanny Lopez	UD	4	2006-10-27	(Mexico) Parque Revolución, Culiacán, Sinaloa	
1	Loss	0-1	(Mexico) Geovanny Lopez	TKO	2 (4)	2005-12-17	(Mexico) Parque Revolución, Culiacán, Sinaloa	

== See also ==
- List of world mini-flyweight boxing champions
- List of Mexican boxing world champions

Sporting positions
Regional boxing titles
Vacant Title last held by Armando Torres	NABF Mini flyweight champion July 30, 2011 – 2012; Vacated	Vacant Title next held by Eduardo Martinez
World boxing titles
Preceded by Nkosinathi Joyi	IBF Mini flyweight champion September 1, 2012 – March 30, 2013	Succeeded by Katsunari Takayama
