= Carlos Velarde =

Mexican boxer (born 1990)

Personal information
- Nickname: Chapito
- Born: 24 September 1990 (age 35) Culiacán, Sinaloa, Mexico
- Height: 1.74 m (5 ft 9 in)
- Weight: Light Flyweight; Strawweight

Boxing career
- Reach: 183 cm (72 in)
- Stance: Orthodox

Boxing record
- Total fights: 35
- Wins: 28
- Win by KO: 16
- Losses: 5
- Draws: 1
- No contests: 1

Carlos Velarde (born 24 September 1990) is a Mexican professional boxer. He challenged for the WBA minimumweight title in 2013 and the WBO light flyweight title in 2014.

== Professional career ==
On August 28, 2010, Velarde fought Jorle Estrada for the vacant WBC Youth Intercontinental minimumweight title.

== Professional boxing record ==
35 fights	28 wins	5 losses
By knockout	16	3
By decision	12	2
Draws	1	
No contests	1	

No.	Result	Record	Opponent	Type	Round, Time	Date	Location	Notes
35	Win	28–5–1 (1)	Daniel Gonzalez	KO	5 (6), 2:25	14 Jan 2017	Club de Veteranos, Sinaloa de Leyva, Mexico	
34	Loss	27–5–1 (1)	Jonathan Valdenegro	UD	6	9 Dec 2016	Polideportivo Juan S. Millan, Culiacán, Mexico	
33	Win	27–4–1 (1)	Ulises Alarcon Gastelum	TKO	2 (6), 0:13	26 Aug 2016	Polideportivo Juan S. Millan, Culiacán, Mexico	
32	NC	26–4–1 (1)	Valentin Leon	NC	6 (8)	24 Apr 2015	Palenque de la Feria Ganadera, Culiacán, Mexico	Both boxers were disqualified
31	Loss	26–4–1	Donnie Nietes	RTD	7 (12), 3:00	15 Nov 2014	Cebu City Waterfront Hotel & Casino, Barangay Lahug, Cebu City, Philippines	For WBO junior flyweight title
30	Win	26–3–1	José Argumedo	SD	10	3 May 2014	Palenque de la Feria Ganadera, Culiacán, Mexico	Won vacant IBF Latino mini flyweight title
29	Win	25–3–1	Valentin Leon	UD	8	21 Dec 2013	Estacionamiento Eureka, Culiacán, Mexico	
28	Win	24–3–1	Patricio Camacho Valdez	KO	2 (8), 2:15	21 Jun 2013	Estacionamiento Eureka, Culiacán, Mexico	
27	Loss	23–3–1	Ryo Miyazaki	TKO	5 (12), 2:22	8 May 2013	Bodymaker Colosseum, Osaka, Japan	For WBA (Regular) mini flyweight title
26	Win	23–2–1	Ramon Ortega	UD	8	5 Oct 2012	Antro Bar Keops, Culiacán, Mexico	
25	Win	22–2–1	Oswaldo Novoa	TD	6 (10), 2:40	25 May 2012	Parque Revolcuion, Culiacán, Mexico	Velarde cut by accidental head clash; Unanimous technical decision
24	Win	21–2–1	Patricio Camacho Valdez	TKO	2 (12), 0:36	3 Feb 2012	Parque Revolucion, Culiacán, Mexico	
23	Loss	20–2–1	Edwin Diaz	UD	8	22 Oct 2011	Arena Roberto Durán, Panama City, Panama	For vacant WBA Fedecaribe mini flyweight title
22	Win	20–1–1	Juan Pedro Perez	KO	2 (8), 2:34	16 Jul 2011	Lobo Dome, Mazatlán, Mexico	
21	Win	21–1–1	Gabriel Ramirez	KO	2 (10), 2:07	1 Apr 2011	Gimnasio German Evers, Mazatlán, Mexico	
20	Win	18–1–1	Hugo Olvera	TKO	2 (8), 2:13	17 Dec 2010	Gimnasio German Evers, Mazatlán, Mexico	
19	Win	17–1–1	Jorle Estrada	TKO	3 (10), 2:56	28 Aug 2010	Lobo Dome, Mazatlán, Mexico	Won vacant WBC Youth Intercontinental mini flyweight title
18	Win	16–1–1	Eduardo Gonzalez	UD	10	28 May 2010	Gimnasio German Evers, Mazatlán, Mexico	
17	Win	15–1–1	Miguel Angel Hernandez	UD	10	26 Feb 2010	Gimnasio German Evers, Mazatlán, Mexico	
16	Win	14–1–1	Irving Cortes	KO	3 (8), 2:59	12 Dec 2009	Plaza de Toros Rea, Mazatlán, Mexico	
15	Win	13–1–1	Javier Murillo	KO	1 (10), 2:32	2 Oct 2009	Gimnasio German Evers, Mazatlán, Mexico	
14	Win	12–1–1	Marcos Magallan	KO	1 (6), 1:26	21 Aug 2009	Gimnasio German Evers, Mazatlán, Mexico	
13	Win	11–1–1	Hugo Olvera	KO	3 (6), 0:38	3 Jul 2009	Gimnasio German Evers, Mazatlán, Mexico	
12	Loss	10–1–1	Jesús Silvestre	TKO	5 (10), 2:31	14 Feb 2009	Gimnasio German Evers, Mazatlán, Mexico	
11	Win	10–0–1	German Aaron Cota	TKO	4 (6)	19 Dec 2008	Gimnasio German Evers, Mazatlán, Mexico	
10	Win	9–0–1	Jorge Cruz	UD	6	7 Nov 2008	Parque Revolucion, Culiacán, Mexico	
9	Win	8–0–1	Juan Perez	KO	2 (6)	3 Oct 2008	Gimmasio German Evers, Mazatlán, Mexico	
8	Win	7–0–1	German Aaron Cota	UD	4	27 Sep 2008	Parque Revolucion, Culiacán, Mexico	
7	Win	6–0–1	German Aaron Cota	UD	4	4 Sep 2008	Bilbao Discoteque, Culiacán, Mexico	
6	Win	5–0–1	Octavio Garcia	UD	4	16 May 2008	Gimnasio German Evers, Mazatlán, Mexico	
5	Win	4–0–1	Juan Perez	KO	2 (4)	18 Apr 2008	Gimnasio German Evers, Mazatlán, Mexico	
4	Win	3–0–1	Antonio Jose Ruiz	TKO	2 (4)	9 Feb 2008	El Fuerte, Mexico	
3	Win	2–0–1	German Aaron Cota	UD	4	8 Feb 2008	Salon Eventos Modelo, Guasave, Mexico	
2	Win	1–0–1	Jesus Fernandez	UD	4	14 Dec 2007	Parque Revolucion, Culiacán, Mexico	
1	Draw	0–0–1	Daniel Contreras Jr.	PTS	4	13 Jul 2007	Parque Revolucion, Culiacán, Mexico	
