= Merlito Sabillo =

Filipino boxer (born 1984)

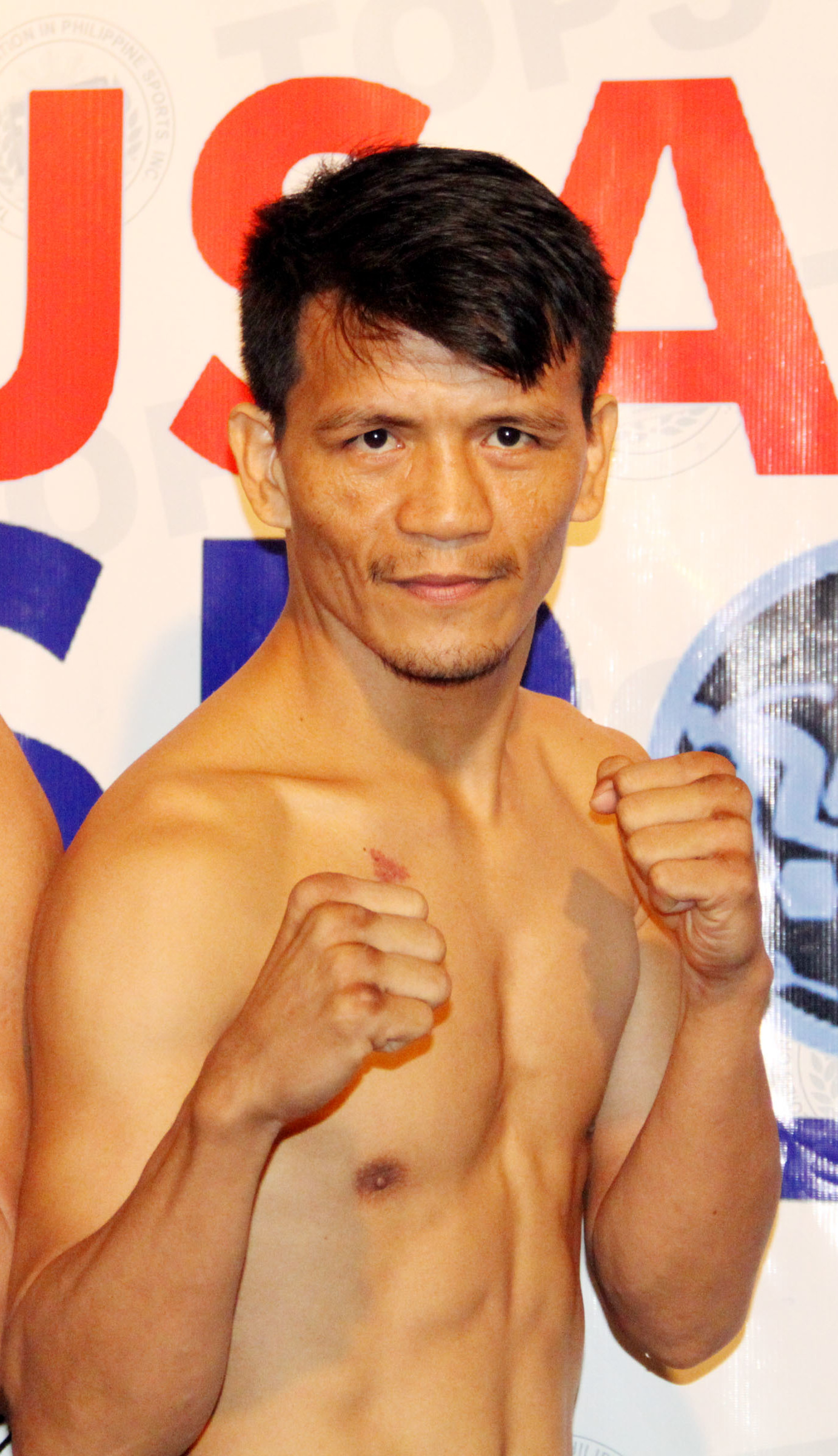
- Sabillo in 2020

Personal information
- Nickname: Tiger
- Nationality: Filipino
- Born: Merlito Labrador Sabillo Jr. January 19, 1984 (age 42) Toboso, Negros Occidental, Philippines
- Height: 5 ft 3 in (1.60 m)
- Weight: Minimumweight Light flyweight

Boxing career
- Stance: Southpaw

Boxing record
- Total fights: 36
- Wins: 27
- Win by KO: 13
- Losses: 8
- Draws: 1

Merlito Sabillo (born January 19, 1984) is a Filipino professional boxer. He is a former WBO Minimumweight World Champion.

== Professional career ==
=== Early years as professional boxer ===
In 2008, at the age of 24, Sabillo started his career as professional boxer. On, August 1, 2010, he won the Philippines Games and Amusement Board (GAB) strawweight title against Jetly Purisima via twelve round unanimous decision.

On October 8, 2011, Sabillo won the vacant OPBF Minimumweight Title against his landsman Rodel Tejares via twelve round unanimous decision.

=== Minimumweight division ===
On March 9, 2013, Sabillo defeated Colombia's Luis de la Rosa via 8-round technical knockout to win the interim WBO Minimumweight world title. He was later promoted to full champion after original champion Moises Fuentes vacated the title to move up to Light Flyweight. He successfully made his first title defence against Jorle Estrada on July 13, 2013. He retained his title for a second time against Nicaraguan Carlos Buitrago in a bout ending in a disputed split decision. In his next fight, Sabillo lost the title to Francisco Rodriguez, Jr. via tenth-round TKO. On November 15, 2014, Merlito Sabillo lost to the hard-hitting Indonesian Journeyman Ellias Nggenggo. The fight turned into street brawl as the two fighters, throwing some wild punches and hard exchanges. In the end Merlito Sabillo come up short as the Indonesian visitor Ellias Nggenggo wins the bout.

On June 12, 2015, Sabillo defeated his fellow Filipino Countrymen Powell Balaba into a 6-round fighting contest that was held at the L' Fisher Hotel, La Proa Ballroom, Bacolod, Negros Occidental, Philippines. On November 29, 2015, he defeated the Indonesian Fighter Jack Amisa into a 6-round contest. On May 8, 2016, he face the Japanese Prospect Riku Kano at Bunka Center, Sanda, Hyōgo Prefecture for the interim OPBF Minimumweight title. In the earlier rounds, Merlito used his experience as he utilized his Left Straight Hand and Right Hook. Kano began to warm up with rounds 3 and 4 being much more competitive. Going at the last 4 rounds both men started to show the signs of fatigue at the ring. Kano was trying to pick-up the fight and began to land shots while Sabillo lost his footwork and could not connect any of his punches to his opponent. Both men displayed their courage in the ring and they gave the audience a better fight. In the end Sabillo fell short and the much younger Japanese Prospect Riku Kano wins the bout and the OPBF Minimumweight title.

On November 11, 2016, the Former World Champion Merlito Sabillo was back to Japan for the second time as he faced the hard-hitting Japanese Professional Boxer Ryuya Yamanaka for the vacant OPBF Minimumweight title. Sabillo started well in the earlier rounds as he landed clean shots establishing his ground on the earlier bout. As the bout progressed Yamanaka built his confidence as he connected a body shot on Sabillo and landed some serious shots on him making Sabillo lost his ground and his defense as the fight proceeds. In the end Sabillo fell short and Yamanaka claim the OPBF Minimumweight title, making Sabillo, make his second lost in Japan.

=== Light flyweight division ===
On May 27, 2017, he defeated the Indonesian Fighter, Jack Amisa for a vacant Asian Boxing Federation Light Flyweight title. He successfully defend his Asian Boxing Federation Light Flyweight Title to his Filipino Countrymen Crison Omayao. On February 17, 2018, Merlito Sabillo lost to the undefeated Filipino Prospect Edward Heno to a 12-round fight for the unification of Oriental and Pacific Boxing Federation and Asian Boxing Federation Light Flyweight titles. On September 15, 2018, he fought the Chinese Fighter Jing Xiang for a vacant World Boxing Council Silver Light Flyweight title where he lost by unanimous decision.

== Professional boxing record ==
36 fights	27 wins	8 losses
By knockout	13	4
By decision	14	4
Draws	1	

No.	Result	Record	Opponent	Type	Round, time	Date	Location	Notes
36	Loss	27-8-1	(Japan) Sho Kimura	TKO	2 (10), 2:16	Feb 15, 2020	Manila Arena, Manila, Metro Manila, Philippines	
35	Loss	27-7-1	(Mexico) Daniel Valladares	TKO	7 (8), 2:08	Apr 13, 2019	Arena Monterrey, Monterrey, Nuevo León, Mexico	
34	Loss	27-6-1	(China) Jing Xiang	UD	12	Sep 15, 2018	Qinzhou Sports Center Gymnasium, Qinzhou, China	For vacant WBC Silver light-flyweight title
33	Loss	27-5-1	(Philippines) Edward Heno	SD	12	Feb 17, 2018	Gaisano City Mall, Bacolod, Negros Occidental, Philippines	Lost Asian Boxing Federation light-flyweight title; For OPBF light-flyweight title
32	Win	27-4-1	(Philippines) Crison Omayao	UD	12	Oct 20, 2017	SM City Bacolod Parking Area, Bacolod, Negros Occidental, Philippines	Retained Asian Boxing Federation light-flyweight title
31	Win	26-4-1	(Indonesia) Jack Amisa	KO	3 (12) 2:58	May 27, 2017	888 Chinatown Square Mall, Bacolod, Negros Occidental, Philippines	Won vacant Asian Boxing Federation light-flyweight title
30	Loss	25-4-1	(Japan) Ryuya Yamanaka	UD	12	Nov 11, 2016	Central Gym, Kobe, Hyogo, Japan	For vacant OPBF mini-flyweight title
29	Loss	25-3-1	(Japan) Riku Kano	SD	12	May 8, 2016	Bunka Center, Sanda, Hyogo, Japan	For OPBF interim mini-flyweight title
28	Win	25-2-1	(Indonesia) Jack Amisa	UD	6	Nov 29, 2015	La Trinidad Municipal Gymnasium, La Trinidad, Benguet, Philippines	
27	Win	24-2-1	(Philippines) Powell Balaba	UD	6	Jun 12, 2015	L' Fisher Hotel, La Proa Ballroom, Bacolod, Negros Occidental, Philippines	
26	Loss	23-2-1	(Indonesia) Ellias Nggenggo	TKO	4 (10), 1:50	Nov 15, 2014	Waterfront Cebu City Hotel & Casino, Cebu City, Cebu, Philippines	
25	Loss	23-1-1	(Mexico) Francisco Rodríguez Jr.	TKO	10 (12), 1:50	Mar 22, 2014	Monterrey Arena, Monterrey, Nuevo León, Mexico	Lost WBO mini-flyweight title
24	Draw	23-0-1	(Nicaragua) Carlos Buitrago	SD	12	Nov 29, 2013	Smart Araneta Coliseum, Quezon City, Metro Manila, Philippines	Retained WBO mini-flyweight title
23	Win	23-0	(Colombia) Jorle Estrada	TKO	9 (12), 1:09	Jul 13, 2013	Solaire Resort & Casino, Pasay, Metro Manila, Philippines	Retained WBO mini-flyweight title
22	Win	22-0	(Colombia) Luis De la Rosa	TKO	8 (12), 2:52	Mar 9, 2013	Coliseo Mario de León, Cereté, Colombia	Won WBO interim mini-flyweight title
21	Win	21-0	(Philippines) Rollen Del Castillo	RTD	1 (10), 3:00	Dec 15, 2012	PAGCOR Hotel and Casino, Bacolod, Negros Occidental, Philippines	
20	Win	20-0	(Philippines) Jovel Romasasa	KO	1 (8), 2:50	Sep 22, 2012	Waterfront Cebu City Hotel & Casino, Cebu City, Cebu, Philippines	
19	Win	19-0	(Philippines) Jonathan Refugio	TKO	7 (12), 2:36	May 4, 2012	L' Fisher Hotel, Bacolod, Negros Occidental, Philippines	Retained OPBF mini-flyweight title
18	Win	18-0	(Indonesia) Sofyan Effendi	UD	8	Jan 28, 2012	Waterfront Cebu City Hotel & Casino, Cebu City, Cebu, Philippines	
17	Win	17-0	(Philippines) Rodel Tejares	UD	12	Oct 8, 2011	University of St. La Salle, Bacolod, Negros Occidental, Philippines	Won vacant OPBF mini-flyweight title
16	Win	16-0	(Philippines) Roger Echavez	TKO	7 (12), 2:45	Apr 30, 2011	PAGCOR Hotel and Casino, Bacolod, Negros Occidental, Philippines	Retained Philippines Games & Amusement Board mini-flyweight title
15	Win	15-0	(Philippines) Jade Yagahon	KO	3 (10), 1:20	Feb 26, 2011	PAGCOR Hotel and Casino, Bacolod, Negros Occidental, Philippines	
14	Win	14-0	(Philippines) Donny Mabao	MD	12	Nov 20, 2010	PAGCOR Hotel and Casino, Bacolod, Negros Occidental, Philippines	Retained Philippines Games & Amusement Board mini-flyweight title
13	Win	13-0	(Philippines) Jetly Purisima	UD	12	Aug 1, 2010	PAGCOR Hotel and Casino, Bacolod, Negros Occidental, Philippines	Won vacant Philippines Games & Amusement Board mini-flyweight title
12	Win	12-0	(Philippines) Amero Ricablanca	RTD	4 (8), 3:00	May 29, 2010	PAGCOR Hotel and Casino, Bacolod, Negros Occidental, Philippines	
11	Win	11-0	(Philippines) Roel Honor	UD	10	Feb 21, 2010	PAGCOR Hotel and Casino, Bacolod, Negros Occidental, Philippines	
10	Win	10-0	(Philippines) Jetly Purisima	UD	10	Dec 12, 2009	PAGCOR Hotel and Casino, Bacolod, Negros Occidental, Philippines	
9	Win	9-0	(Philippines) Jetly Purisima	SD	10	Aug 29, 2009	PAGCOR Hotel and Casino, Bacolod, Negros Occidental, Philippines	
8	Win	8-0	(Philippines) Fabio Marfa	UD	10	May 30, 2009	PAGCOR Hotel and Casino, Bacolod, Negros Occidental, Philippines	
7	Win	7-0	(Philippines) Arnel Tadena	RTD	4 (8), 3:00	Feb 21, 2009	PAGCOR Hotel and Casino, Bacolod, Negros Occidental, Philippines	
6	Win	6-0	(Philippines) Ruther del Castillo	UD	8	Nov 29, 2008	PAGCOR Hotel and Casino, Bacolod, Negros Occidental, Philippines	
5	Win	5-0	(Philippines) Steve Demaisip	KO	5 (6), 2:59	Sep 20, 2008	PAGCOR Hotel and Casino, Bacolod, Negros Occidental, Philippines	
4	Win	4-0	(Philippines) Edcel Tunacao	TKO	3 (6), 0:58	Jul 12, 2008	West Negros University, Bacolod, Negros Occidental, Philippines	
3	Win	3-0	(Philippines) Leo Torres	TKO	2 (4), 1:15	May 12, 2008	Loay Public Market, Loay, Bohol, Philippines	
2	Win	2-0	(Philippines) Junel Busano	UD	4	Mar 15, 2008	PAGCOR Hotel and Casino, Bacolod, Negros Occidental, Philippines	
1	Win	1-0	(Philippines) Powell Balaba	UD	4	Jan 26, 2008	PAGCOR Hotel and Casino, Bacolod, Negros Occidental, Philippines	

== Titles in boxing ==
Major World Titles:

- WBO Minimumweight Champion (105 lbs)

Regional Titles:

- OPBF Minimumweight title. (105 lbs)
- ABF light flyweight Title (108 lbs)
- Philippines Games & Amusement Board Minimumweight title. (105 lbs)

== See also ==
- List of WBO world champions
- List of Filipino boxing world champions

Achievements
Vacant Title last held by Raúl García	WBO minimumweight champion Interim title March 9, 2013 – April 19, 2013; Promoted	Vacant Title next held by Tatsuya Fukuhara
Preceded by Moisés Fuentes; Vacated	WBO minimumweight champion April 19, 2013 – March 22, 2014	Succeeded by Francisco Rodríguez Jr.
