= José Alfredo Zúñiga =

Mexican boxer (born 1985)

Personal information
- Nickname: Diablito
- Born: 29 January 1985 (age 41) Matamoros, Tamaulipas, Mexico
- Weight: Bantamweight

Boxing career
- Stance: Orthodox

Boxing record
- Total fights: 19
- Wins: 11
- Win by KO: 5
- Losses: 7
- Draws: 1

José Alfredo Zúñiga (born 2 October 1985) is a Mexican professional boxer.

== Professional career ==
Zúñiga will fight Alberto Rossel for the WBA interim light flyweight title.
