= Lobodome =

Indoor arena in Mazatlán, Sinaloa, Mexico

Coordinates: 23.2450°N 106.4373°W

The Lobodome (officially Lobodome de la UAD a Mazatlan) is a 3,000-seat indoor arena located in Mazatlán, Sinaloa, Mexico.

It is used primarily for basketball, and is home to the Lobos de Universidad Autónoma de Durango-Mazatlán basketball team. It is also used for concerts, boxing and lucha libre. It was one of the original buildings of the UAD's Mazatlan campus which was established in 1999. One of the first events at the arena was a concert by Lorena Herrera, a Mazatlán native. Until the Mazatlán International Center was built, it was the largest indoor venue in the city. Concert capacity of the Lobodome is around 8,000. Despite its name, the arena's roof is arch-shaped.

The Lobodome was the site of an exhibition basketball game featuring NBA stars on October 8, 2011, during the NBA Lockout. In addition to the aforementioned, other national and international stars, including Thalía, Gloria Trevi, Paulina Rubio, Los Tigres del Norte, Rocío Dúrcal, Maribel Guardia, Vicente Fernández, Pepe Aguilar, Jenni Rivera, and even Air Supply have performed here.
