= Simphiwe =

- Gender: Unisex
- Language: Nguni

Origin
- Origin: Southern African

Other names
- Short form: S'phiwe
- Related names: Refiloe

Simphiwe is a South African given name. Notable people with this name include:

- Simphiwe Dana (born 1980), South African singer-songwriter
- Simphiwe Dludlu (born 1987), South African football defender
- Simphiwe Khonco, South African boxer
- Simphiwe Nongqayi (born 1972), South African boxer
- Simphiwe Yiba (born 1992), South African cricketer
