= Florante Condes =

Filipino boxer

Personal information
- Nickname: The Little Pacquiao
- Nationality: (Philippines) Filipino
- Born: Florante Condes, Jr. May 20, 1980 (age 46) Looc, Romblon, Philippines
- Height: 5 ft 2 in (1.57 m)
- Weight: Minimumweight

Boxing career
- Stance: Southpaw

Boxing record
- Total fights: 38
- Wins: 27
- Win by KO: 23
- Losses: 10
- Draws: 1

Florante Condes Jr. (born May 20, 1980, in Looc, Romblon, Philippines), is a Filipino retired professional boxer and a former IBF Minimumweight World Champion.

== Boxing career ==
Condes turned professional in 2002. On July 7, 2007, Condes won the IBF minimumweight title by a split decision victory over Muhammad Rachman. There, he knocked Rachman down twice (once in the 3rd round and again in the 10th). The bout was held in the studio of the private RCTI television station in Jakarta, Indonesia. Salven Lagumbay of the Philippines and Montol Suriyachand of Thailand, scored it 114-112 for Condes, while the home judge Muhammad Rois gave it 114-112 for Rachman.

Condes and Nonito Donaire have made it to the prestigious Ring Magazine rankings (July 9). The bible of boxing put Donaire at no. 1 spot in the flyweight division (112 pounds). Condes, on the other hand, is at third in the straw weight division (105 lbs).

After 11 months and 6 days of inactivity, Condes finally got the chance to defend his title. Unfortunately, he (22–4–1) lost his title on to undefeated Mexican Raul Garcia (23–0–1) via twelve-round split decision (scores 112–115, 115–112, 118–110) in La Paz, Mexico, despite scoring a knockdown in the final round.

He attempted to gain another shot at the title he lost to Garcia by facing Nkosinathi Joyi in an eliminator on June 26, 2009. Condes, however, was downed in the 11th as well as losing the match by unanimous decision.

== Troubled career ==
Condes' rising career became a nightmare when it was revealed that his registered manager wasn't actually Aljoe Jaro but Jaro's wife. A $10,000 bonus from American promoters paid to Jaro that he was supposed to receive from Jaro never came. Because of these issues, Condes said in an interview that his career may come to end.

== Professional boxing record ==
38 fights	27 wins	10 losses
By knockout	23	0
By decision	4	10
Draws	1	

No.	Result	Record	Opponent	Type	Round, time	Date	Location	Notes
38	Loss	27–10–1	(Philippines) Melvin Jerusalem	MD	8	Feb 27, 2016	Waterfront Cebu City Hotel & Casino, Cebu City, Philippines	
37	Loss	27–9–1	(Japan) Ryoichi Taguchi	UD	8	Jul 5, 2014	Korakuen Hall, Tokyo, Japan	
36	Win	27–8–1	(Philippines) Cris Alfante	TKO	7 (12), 1:25	Mar 15, 2014	Barangay San Dionisio Covered Court, Parañaque, Philippines	Won vacant IBF Pan Pacific minimumweight title
35	Win	26–8–1	(Philippines) Charlie Cabilla	TKO	1 (6), 2:13	Jan 11, 2014	Namayan Basketball Arena, Mandaluyong, Philippines	
34	Loss	25–8–1	(Philippines) Donny Mabao	MD	12	Dec 8, 2012	PAGCOR Grand Theater, Parañaque, Philippines	For WBC Asian Continental minimumweight title
33	Loss	25–7–1	(South Africa) Hekkie Budler	UD	12	Sep 22, 2012	Emperors Palace, Kempton Park, South Africa	For IBO minimumweight title
32	Loss	25–6–1	(Thailand) Wanheng Menayothin	UD	12	Jun 24, 2011	Chokchai 4 Market, Bangkok, Thailand	For WBC Silver International minimumweight title
31	Win	25–5–1	(Japan) Kenichi Horikawa	TKO	7 (10), 2:40	Nov 27, 2010	Waterfront Cebu City Hotel & Casino, Cebu City, Philippines	
30	Win	24–5–1	(Indonesia) Sofyan Effendi	UD	8	Aug 28, 2010	Waterfront Cebu City Hotel & Casino, Cebu City, Philippines	
29	Loss	23–5–1	(South Africa) Nkosinathi Joyi	UD	12	Jun 26, 2009	Orient Theatre, East London, South Africa	
28	Win	23–4–1	(Philippines) Ronelle Ferreras	TD	5 (10), 0:42	Dec 13, 2008	Compostela Sports Complex, Compostela, Philippines	Fight stopped due to a cut on the corner of Condes's right eyelid produced from an accidental headbutt in round 5
27	Loss	22–4–1	(Mexico) Raúl García	SD	12	Jun 14, 2008	Estadio de Beisbol Arturo C. Nahl, La Paz, Mexico	Lost IBF minimumweight title
26	Win	22–3–1	(Indonesia) Muhammad Rachman	SD	12	Jul 7, 2007	RCTI Studio, Jakarta, Indonesia	Won IBF minimumweight title
25	Win	21–3–1	(Philippines) Julius Alcos	UD	8	Dec 9, 2006	Ynares Plaza Gymnasium, Binangonan, Philippines	
24	Win	20–3–1	(Philippines) Fabio Marfa	TKO	6 (12), 1:06	Sep 17, 2006	Cantada Sports Center, Taguig, Philippines	Retained PGAB Filipino minimumweight title
23	Win	19–3–1	(Philippines) Jun Ebale	KO	4 (10), 1:59	Jun 26, 2006	Salceda Sports Complex, Polangui, Philippines	
22	Win	18–3–1	(Philippines) Armando de la Cruz	TKO	5 (12), 2:46	Apr 21, 2006	Plaza Rajah Sulayman, Manila, Philippines	Retained PGAB Filipino minimumweight title
21	Win	17–3–1	(Philippines) Elmer Gejon	TKO	5 (12), 1:21	Feb 9, 2006	Mandaluyong Gym, Mandaluyong, Philippines	Won PGAB Filipino minimumweight title
20	Win	16–3–1	(Philippines) Philip Parcon	TKO	6 (10), 1:44	Dec 10, 2005	Sta. Lucia Mall, Cainta, Philippines	Won PBF minimumweight title
19	Win	15–3–1	(Philippines) Jhay Herla	KO	6 (10)	Oct 28, 2005	Trece Martires, Philippines	
18	Win	14–3–1	(Philippines) Danny Linasa	TKO	4 (10), 2:31	Jun 25, 2005	Pag-asa Gym, Binangonan, Philippines	
17	Loss	13–3–1	(Philippines) Benjie Sorolla	SD	10	May 1, 2005	Quezon City, Philippines	
16	Win	13–2–1	(Thailand) Sanan Nonglek 3K Battery	KO	1 (?)	Apr 9, 2005	Angono Auditorium, Angono, Philippines	
15	Win	12–2–1	(Thailand) Sanan Nonglek 3K Battery	KO	1 (?)	Feb 18, 2005	Mandaluyong, Philippines	
14	Win	11–2–1	(Philippines) Rollen Del Castillo	TKO	9 (10)	Feb 12, 2005	Mandaluyong Gym, Mandaluyong, Philippines	
13	Win	10–2–1	(Philippines) Allan Dugang	TKO	4 (10), 2:59	Jan 3, 2005	Pelaéz Sports Complex, Cagayan de Oro, Philippines	
12	Win	9–2–1	(Philippines) Danny Linasa	TKO	8 (10), 2:50	Dec 5, 2004	San Juan Gym, Taytay, Philippines	
11	Win	8–2–1	(Philippines) Ryan Bito	TKO	4 (8)	Sep 26, 2004	Taytay Gym, Taytay, Philippines	
10	Win	7–2–1	(Philippines) Danny Linasa	TKO	4 (8), 0:28	Dec 20, 2003	Imus, Philippines	
9	Win	6–2–1	(Philippines) Obet Desantores	KO	1 (6), 2:01	Oct 18, 2003	Binangonan Gym, Binangonan, Philippines	
8	Loss	5–2–1	(Philippines) Greg Mangan	UD	6	May 25, 2003	Cantada Sports Center, Taguig, Philippines	
7	Draw	5–1–1	(Philippines) Robert Rubillar	MD	6	Apr 11, 2003	Elorde Sports Center, Parañaque, Philippines	
6	Win	5–1	(Philippines) Sonny Boy Jaro	TKO	2 (4)	Mar 15, 2003	Quirino Grandstand, Manila, Philippines	
5	Win	4–1	(Philippines) Ricky Seniego	KO	2 (6), 2:09	Jan 19, 2003	Cantada Sports Center, Taguig, Philippines	
4	Win	3–1	(Philippines) Noel Guliman	KO	1 (4), 2:49	Dec 14, 2002	Marick Gym, Cainta, Philippines	
3	Win	2–1	(Philippines) Romel Engracia	TKO	1 (4)	Nov 2, 2002	Cantada Sports Center, Taguig, Philippines	
2	Loss	1–1	(Philippines) Sonny Boy Jaro	SD	4	Sep 18, 2002	PAGCOR Grand Theater, Parañaque, Philippines	
1	Win	1–0	(Philippines) Ruben Billones	KO	2 (4)	Jun 15, 2002	PAGCOR Grand Theater, Parañaque, Philippines	

== See also ==
- List of Filipino boxing world champions

Preceded by Muhammad Rachman	IBF Minimumweight Champion; July 7, 2007 – June 14, 2008	Succeeded by Raúl García
