= Melvin Jerusalem =

Filipino boxer (born 1994)

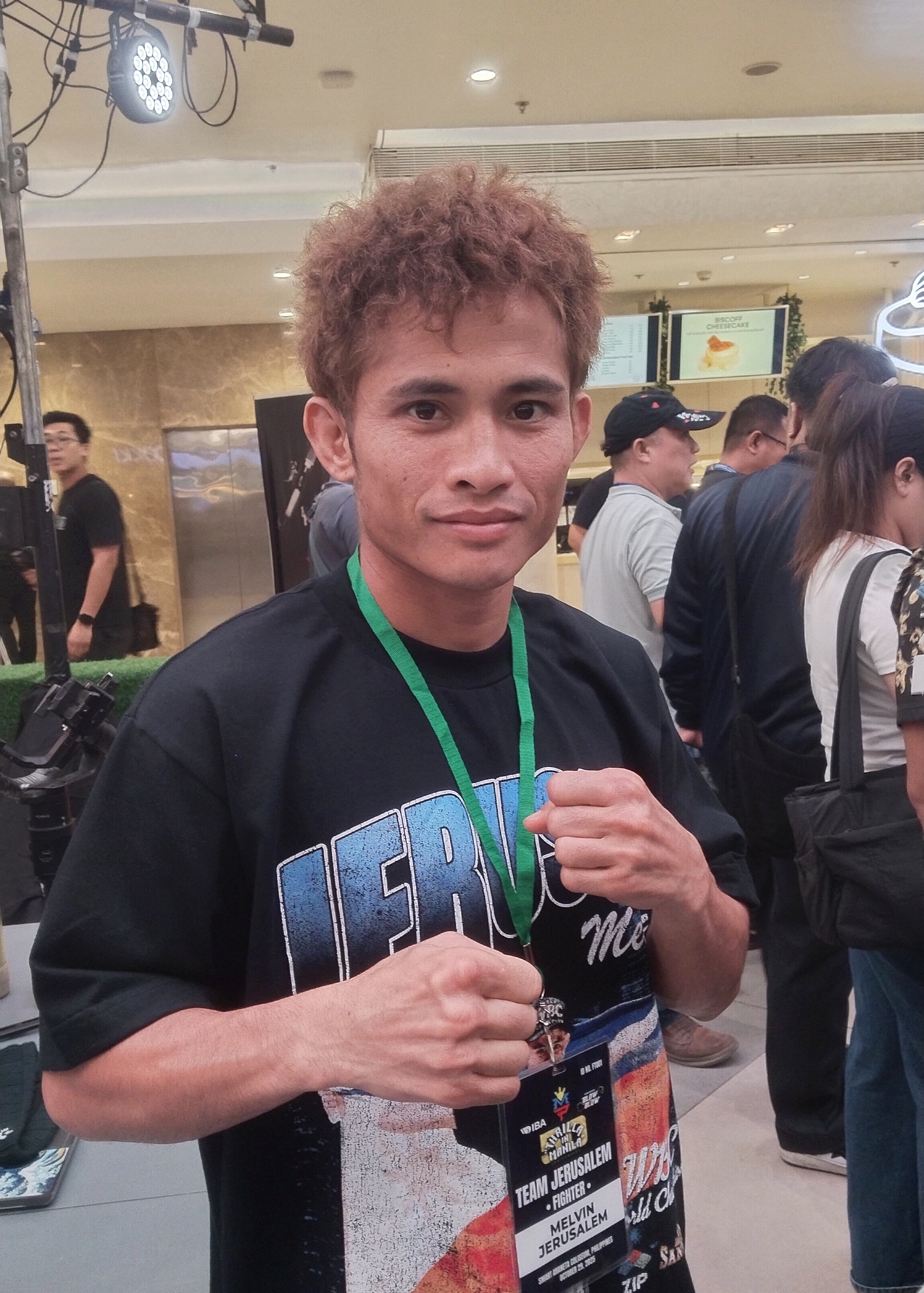
- Jerusalem in 2025

Personal information
- Nickname: El Gringo ("The White Guy")
- Born: Melvin Oliva Jerusalem; 22 February 1994 (age 32) Manolo Fortich, Bukidnon
- Height: 5 ft 2 in (157 cm)
- Weight: Mini flyweight

Boxing career
- Reach: 62 in (157 cm)
- Stance: Orthodox

Boxing record
- Total fights: 29
- Wins: 25
- Win by KO: 12
- Losses: 4

Melvin Oliva Jerusalem (born 22 February 1994) is a Filipino professional boxer. He is a two-time mini-flyweight champion, having held the World Boxing Organization (WBO) title in 2023, and the World Boxing Council (WBC) title from 2024 to 2026.

== Professional career ==
=== Early career ===
==== First title challenge ====
Jerusalem, ranked #9 in the WBC strawweight rankings, faced off against champion Wanheng Menayothin on January 25, 2017. Menayothin won by a closely contested unanimous decision. Jerusalem was deducted a point in the eight round for a low blow; the bout would have finished in a majority draw otherwise.

After suffering the first loss of his professional career, Jerusalem was scheduled to face Joey Canoy on the undercard of the "Pinoy Pride 41" event on July 8, 2017. He lost the fight by unanimous decision, with scores of 95–93, 95–93 and 96–92. Jerusalem was knocked down in the seventh round and was deducted a point in the eight round for repeated low blows. Jerusalem faced Jestoni Racoma at Pinoy Pride 43 on November 25, 2017. He successfully rebounded from his first professional losses by beating Racoma by unanimous decision, with scores of 78–74, 80–72, 80–82.

Jerusalem was scheduled to face Philip Luis Cuerdo on June 9, 2018, at Pinoy Pride 44. He won the fight by an eight-round technical knockout. Jerusalem was scheduled to face Toto Landero on November 10, 2018. He won the fight by unanimous decision with one judge scoring the fight 97–93 for him, while the remaining two judges awarded him a 98–92 scorecard.

Jerusalem's sole fight of 2019 was against Reymark Taday on August 17, 2019. He won the fight by a seventh-round stoppage, as Taday chose to retire from the fight at the end of the round. Jerusalem fought only once in 2020 as well, against Jayson Francisco, whom he beat by a second-round knockout.

==== OPBF strawweight champion ====
Jerusalem was booked to fight Toto Landero for the vacant OPBF strawweight title on July 16, 2021, at the Tabunoc Sports Complex in Talisay, Philippines. He won the rematch by unanimous decision, with judges scoring the fight 118–110 in his favor, while the third judge scored it 116–112 for Jerusalem. Jerusalem was next scheduled to face the journeyman Ramel Antaran in a stay-busy non-title bout on 26 February 2022. He won the fight by unanimous decision. Two judges scored the bout 79–73 in his favor, while the third judge scored the fight 77–75 for Jerusalem.

=== WBO mini-flyweight champion ===
==== Jerusalem vs. Taniguchi ====
Jerusalem challenged the reigning WBO mini-flyweight champion Masataka Taniguchi in the main event of "3150 FIGHT vol.4", which took place at the Osaka Prefectural Gymnasium in Osaka, Japan on January 6, 2023, and was broadcast by Abema TV. After losing the opening round 10–9 on two of the judges' scorecards, Jerusalem won the fight by a second-round technical knockout. He knocked Taniguchi down with a one-two combination near the first minute of the round, which left the champion unable to recover sufficiently enough to beat the ten count.

==== Jerusalem vs. Collazo ====
On January 30, 2023, Jerusalem was ordered by the WBO to make his first title defense against the unbeaten mandatory challenger Oscar Collazo. The two camps failed to reach a deal within the allotted 30-day negotiation period and a purse bid was called for February 23, which was later declared deserted by the WBO, as representatives of the two fighters failed to comply with the purse bid terms. The purse bid was rescheduled for February 27 and won by Golden Boy Promotions and Cotto Promotions, who submitted a bid of $152,000. The championship bout took place at the Fantasy Springs Casino in Indio, California on May 27, 2023. Jerusalem lost the fight by a seventh-round stoppage, as he retired from the bout at the end of the round.

=== WBC mini-flyweight champion ===
==== Jerusalem vs. Shigeoka ====
On March 31, 2024, in Nagoya, Japan, Jerusalem challenged WBC minimumweight champion Yudai Shigeoka. Jerusalem twice sent the champion to the canvas, en route to winning the fight by a narrow split decision. One judge scored the bout 114–113 for Shigeoka, while the remaining two ringside officials had it an identical 114–112 for away fighter. Jerusalem handed Shigeoka his first professional defeat, while he became a two-time world titlist.

==== Jerusalem vs. Castillo ====
On September 22, 2024, in Mandaluyong, Philippines, Jerusalem was scheduled to make the first defense of his WBC minimumweight title against undefeated Mexican Luis Castillo. Jerusalem once sent the challenger to the canvas in the first round and successfully defended his championship with a lopsided decision.

==== Jerusalem vs. Shigeoka II ====
On March 30, 2025, in Aichi Sky Expo, Tokoname, Japan, Jerusalem defended his WBC minimumweight title against Yudai Shigeoka in a rematch. Jerusalem controlled the match unto the final round winning via Unanimous Decision with lopsided scores of 118–110, 119–109 and 116–112.

==== Jerusalem vs Kuse ====
===== Thrilla in Manila: 50th Anniversary =====
Jerusalem was scheduled to fight South African boxer Siyakholwa Kuse on October 29, 2025, with the collaborations of Blow by Blow, MP Promotions, and the International Boxing Association setting the event billed as Thrilla in Manila: 50th Anniversary. It is meant as the 50th anniversary commemoration of the original Thrilla in Manila 1975 fight between Muhammad Ali and Joe Frazier. Jerusalem successfully defended his title, defeating Kuse by unanimous decision. Despite a commentable effort from Kuse, Jerusalem controlled the fight. The fight began slowly, with Kuse attempting powerful combinations but struggling with defensive, which ultimately cost him. There were some fouls in the earlier rounds. Kuse was dropped, but this was ruled a slip. Open scoring was revealed split among judges after eight rounds, with Jerusalem leading on two cards and Kuse on one. The championship rounds saw both exchange heavy punches, with Jerusalem landing a significant right hand that wobbled Kuse just before the end. The closely contested fight was scored 116–112 (twice) and 115–113, for Jerusalem. After the fight, Jerusalem stated his next goal was to pursue world title unifications, targeting IBF champion Pedro Taduran in an all-Filipino bout.

==== Jerusalem vs Kuse 2 ====
A rematch between Jerusalem and Kuse took place at Emperors Palace in Kempton Park, South Africa, on 16 May 2026. Kuse won by unanimous decision to claim the WBC mini-flyweight title.

== Professional boxing record ==
28 fights	25 wins	3 losses
By knockout	12	1
By decision	13	2

No.	Result	Record	Opponent	Type	Round, time	Date	Location	Notes
29	Loss	25–4	Siyakholwa Kuse	UD	12	16 May 2026	Emperors Palace, Kempton Park, South Africa	Lost WBC mini-flyweight title
28	Win	25–3	Siyakholwa Kuse	UD	12	29 Oct 2025	Araneta Coliseum, Quezon City, Philippines	Retained WBC mini-flyweight title
27	Win	24–3	Yudai Shigeoka	UD	12	30 Mar 2025	Aichi Sky Expo, Tokoname, Japan	Retained WBC mini-flyweight title
26	Win	23–3	Luis Castillo	UD	12	22 Sep 2024	Mandaluyong City College, Mandaluyong, Philippines	Retained WBC mini-flyweight title
25	Win	22–3	Yudai Shigeoka	SD	12	31 Mar 2024	International Conference Hall, Nagoya, Japan	Won WBC mini-flyweight title
24	Win	21–3	Francis Jay Diaz	UD	8	29 Oct 2023	Robinson's Mall, General Santos City, Philippines	
23	Loss	20–3	Oscar Collazo	RTD	7 (12), 3:00	27 May 2023	Fantasy Springs Casino, Indio, California, U.S.	Lost WBO mini-flyweight title
22	Win	20–2	Masataka Taniguchi	TKO	2 (12), 1:04	6 Jan 2023	Osaka Prefectural Gymnasium, Osaka, Japan	Won WBO mini-flyweight title
21	Win	19–2	Michael Camelion	KO	2 (8), 1:21	24 Aug 2022	Sanman Gym, General Santos, Philippines	
20	Win	18–2	Ramel Antaran	UD	8	26 Feb 2022	Sanman Gym, General Santos, Philippines	
19	Win	17–2	Toto Landero	UD	12	16 Jul 2021	Tabunoc Sports Complex, Talisay, Philippines	Won vacant OPBF mini-flyweight title
18	Win	16–2	Jayson Francisco	KO	2 (8)	17 Dec 2020	Sanman Gym, General Santos, Philippines	
17	Win	15–2	Reymark Taday	RTD	7 (10), 3:00	17 Aug 2019	Superdome, Ormoc, Philippines	
16	Win	14–2	Toto Landero	UD	10	10 Nov 2018	Sports Complex, Minglanilla, Philippines	
15	Win	13–2	Philip Luis Cuerdo	TKO	8 (10), 1:12	9 Jun 2018	Sports Complex, Maasin, Philippines	
14	Win	12–2	Jestoni Racoma	UD	8	25 Nov 2017	Bohol Wisdom School Gym, Tagbilaran, Philippines	
13	Loss	11–2	Joey Canoy	UD	10	8 Jul 2017	IC3 Convention Center, Cebu City, Philippines	
12	Loss	11–1	Wanheng Menayothin	UD	12	25 Jan 2017	Provincial Stadium, Phitsanulok, Thailand	For WBC mini-flyweight title
11	Win	11–0	Fabio Marfa	UD	6	26 Nov 2016	Cebu Coliseum, Cebu City, Philippines	
10	Win	10–0	Jonathan Refugio	UD	10	16 Jul 2016	City Sports and Cultural Complex, Mandaue, Philippines	
9	Win	9–0	Florante Condes	MD	8	27 Feb 2016	Waterfront Hotel & Casino, Cebu City, Philippines	
8	Win	8–0	Crison Omayao	TKO	2 (10), 2:30	28 Nov 2015	Hoops Dome, Lapu-Lapu, Philippines	
7	Win	7–0	Mark Anthony Florida	RTD	7 (10), 3:00	28 Jun 2015	City Cultural Sports Center, Canlaon, Philippines	
6	Win	6–0	Ryan Ralozo	TKO	1 (8), 2:15	30 May 2015	City Cultural and Sports Center, Dapitan, Philippines	
5	Win	5–0	Rodante Suacasa	TKO	1 (6), 1:59	7 Mar 2015	Freedom Park, Malaybalay, Philippines	
4	Win	4–0	Rez Padrogane	KO	2 (6), 1:36	18 Jan 2015	Gaisano Country Mall Parking Lot, Cebu City, Philippines	
3	Win	3–0	Jomar Cenita	KO	2 (4), 0:37	18 Dec 2014	Molo Covered Gym, Iloilo City, Philippines	
2	Win	2–0	Christian Solatorio	TKO	1 (4), 2:30	17 Sep 2014	Agoho Tiger Boxing Club, Mambajao, Philippines	
1	Win	1–0	Michael Camelion	UD	4	13 Jul 2014	ACSAT Gymnasium, Carmen, Philippines	

== Titles in boxing ==
Major world titles:

- WBC mini-flyweight champion (105 lbs)
- WBO mini-flyweight champion (105 lbs)

Regional titles:

- OPBF mini-flyweight champion (105 lbs)

== Awards and recognition ==
- 2024 World Boxing Council's annual Convention "Plaques of Recognition" awardee
- 2025 Philippine Sportswriters Association Awards Night (2024)

== See also ==
- List of Filipino boxing world champions
- List of world mini-flyweight boxing champions

Sporting positions
Regional boxing titles
Vacant Title last held by Lito Dante	OPBF mini-flyweight champion July 16, 2021 – 2022; Vacated	Vacant Title next held by Takeshi Ishii
World boxing titles
Preceded by Masataka Taniguchi	WBO mini-flyweight champion January 6 – May 27, 2023	Succeeded by Oscar Collazo
Preceded by Yudai Shigeoka	WBC mini-flyweight champion March 31, 2024 – May 16, 2026	Succeeded by Siyakholwa Kuse
