= Joey Canoy =

Filipino boxer (born 1993)

Joey Maderal Canoy
Personal information
- Nickname: The Babyface
- Nationality: Filipino
- Born: Joey Maderal Canoy; June 27, 1993 (age 33) General Santos City, Cotabato del Sur, Philippines
- Height: 1.60 m (5 ft 3 in)
- Weight: Light flyweight; Mini flyweight

Boxing career
- Stance: Southpaw

Boxing record
- Total fights: 34
- Wins: 26
- Win by KO: 15
- Losses: 5
- Draws: 2
- No contests: 1

Joey Maderal Canoy (born June 27, 1993) is a Filipino boxer who held the WBC International mini-flyweight title since April 2025. He was challenged once for the IBO light-flyweight title and twice for the IBO mini-flyweight title.

== Amateur career ==
Although very little is known about his amateur career, BoxRec has a record of his highlights. He was the Pinweight gold medalist in the PLDT-ABAP National Boxing Championships in Panabo, Davao del Norte, for the Mindanao Qualifiers in 2011. He was also the Pinweight Gold Medalist in Philippine National Games in Dumaguete, Negros Oriental, in 2012. In the same year, Canoy fought in the PLDT-ABAP National Boxing Championships Elite Men Light flyweight, won against Rafael Sueno in the prelims but lost to Junuel Lacar in the Quarter-finals.

== Professional career ==
=== Mini flyweight ===
==== Debut ====
At 19, Canoy made his debut against fellow journeyman Garry Rojo in the mini flyweight division and won by unanimous decision with scores of 40–35, 40–35, and 40–34.

Canoy built a record of 4–0 with three knockouts before facing compatriot and future Philippines GAB flyweight champion, Felipe Cagubcob Jr., who at the time had a record of 1–1–3. The two fighters clashed in the mini flyweight division at the Barangay Namayan Basketball Arena on January 11, 2014, resulting in a split draw. Canoy continued his career, later defeating Mark Anthony Florida via an eight-round unanimous decision victory.

==== Canoy vs. Tomogdan ====
After compiling a record of 8–0–1, he faced his most challenging opponent yet: Jerry Tomogdan, who had an experienced record of 16–5–2. The two battled for the vacant Philippine Boxing Federation (PBF) mini flyweight title. Tomogdan handed Canoy his first-ever loss via majority decision.

Canoy was expecting a grudge rematch against Tomogdan on August 23, 2015, however, he was instead scheduled to fight a different opponent. He won the vacant Asian Boxing Federation (ABF) mini flyweight title against journeyman Rodel Tejares on the same date, via eighth-round technical knockout.

==== Canoy vs. Espinas ====
After defeating journeymen Jonathan Ricablanca and Rodel Tejares to compose a record of 10–1–1, Canoy faced his next most challenging bout against future WBO Oriental and Philippines GAB light flyweight champion, Jesse Espinas. Canoy was making his first defense of the ABF mini flyweight title, but Espinas snatched the title after defeating Canoy via fifth-round technical knockout on January 12, 2016.

==== Canoy vs. Landero ====
Following his loss to Espinas, Canoy squared off with Fabio Marfa and won via fourth-round TKO on September 3, 2016. Canoy then faced the undefeated, upcoming two-time world title challenger, Toto Landero, at the Jurado Hall of the Philippine Marine Corporation in Taguig. Canoy handed Landero his first loss with a stoppage victory.

=== Light flyweight ===
==== Canoy vs. Budler ====
On February 4, 2017, after compiling a record of 12–2–1, Canoy was given a shot at the vacant IBO light flyweight title at Emperors Palace, South Africa, against Hekkie Budler. Budler secured a stoppage and was crowned the new IBO champion with a seventh-round RTD victory over Canoy.

=== Return to Mini flyweight ===
==== Canoy vs. Jerusalem ====
Canoy faced compatriot and future two-time world champion Melvin Jerusalem on July 8, 2017, in Cebu City, in a non-title bout on the undercard of "Pinoy Pride 41". Canoy won via unanimous decision.

==== Canoy vs. Khonco ====
Canoy once again fought for the IBO crown, this time in the mini flyweight division, against reigning and defending IBO champion Simphiwe Khonco in his fourth title defense. The fight abruptly ended in the fourth round after a clash of heads left Khonco unfit to continue, resulting in a no contest. Khonco refused a rematch, stating, "We took this fight on our own but now we are moving forward."

==== Canoy vs. Joyi ====
Canoy got another shot at the vacant IBO mini flyweight crown against Nkosinathi Joyi. Canoy aimed for a knockout win, stating after the weigh-in, "I had no problem making weight. I know I'm fighting on enemy turf, so I cannot let this end in the judges' hands." However, Canoy was outpointed, resulting in a unanimous decision loss.

=== Return to Light flyweight ===
Canoy won via corner retirement against Jovab Lucas upon his return to the light flyweight division.

==== Canoy vs. Tyirha ====
On May 21, 2021, in East London, South Africa, Canoy battled promising South African prospect Nhlanhla Tyirha for the vacant WBA Inter-continental light flyweight title. Tyirha won via unanimous decision.

=== Return to Mini flyweight ===
==== Canoy vs. Andales ====
Following his decision victory against Michael Camelion, Canoy moved back down to the mini flyweight division, where he battled Rhenrob Andales, a.k.a. ArAr Andales (13–2), in Rizal, Laguna, on April 9, 2022, for Andales' WBO Oriental mini flyweight title. The fight ended in a majority decision draw.

=== Return to Light flyweight ===
Following his TKO victory over Ryan Makiputin, Canoy moved once again to the light flyweight division to face veteran Japanese boxer Kenichi Horikawa (41–17–1) for the vacant OPBF light flyweight title. Canoy successfully became a regional champion, putting his first and only Japanese opponent down with a perfect left uppercut, resulting in a seventh-round TKO and snatching the vacant OPBF belt.

=== Second return to Mini flyweight ===
Prior to defeating Horikawa, on July 12, 2023, Canoy fought compatriot Clyde Azarcon in the mini flyweight division. Canoy won via fourth-round TKO.

==== Cancelled bout vs. Winwood ====
On April 9, 2024, Canoy was scheduled to fight Olympian and two-time WBC International champion, Alex Winwood, in Winwood's hometown of Australia on June 12, 2024. Their bout served as a WBC mini flyweight world title eliminator. However, on May 23, 2024, the bout was indefinitely delayed. The bout and the undercards of the "Uncaged" event were fully scrapped after the main event (Tyson Pedro vs. Kris Terzievski) was cancelled.

After the fight against Winwood was scrapped, Canoy was scheduled for a keep-busy catchweight bout against 8–4–3 compatriot Pablito Balidio on July 11, 2024, in Malungon, Sarangani, Philippines, on the undercard of Sanman Boxing's Jayson Mama vs. Carlo Demecillo. Canoy prevailed early with a first-round knockout.

==== Potential match vs. Zhu & Shigeoka ====
On December 30, 2024, Canoy, ranked number 5 in the IBF mini-flyweight rankings was ordered to have a title eliminator bout against number 3 ranked Chinese knockout artist DianXing Zhu for the mandatory spot against the reigning champion Pedro Taduran, both camps are given a deadline of January 1, 2025 to negotiate, however, Zhu declined stating that he was not interested in figuring in a title eliminator, hence, former IBF mini-flyweight champion Ginjiro Shigeoka, ranked number 4 steps up instead, Canoy advanced to number 3, whilst Shigeoka retains his position. However, the fight was ultimately scrapped as Shigeoka instead pursued an immediate rematch for the IBF world title against Taduran.

==== Canoy vs. Sam ====
On March 4, 2025, Canoy was scheduled to fight Vietnamese Minh Phat Sam for the vacant WBC International mini flyweight title on April 14, 2025, in Cambodia. The bout was later moved to April 27, 2025, at Venue88 in General Santos. He won by technical knockout in the 10th round.

==== Canoy vs. Collazo ====
Canoy was scheduled to challenge WBO and WBA mini-flyweight champion Oscar Collazo at Frontwave Arena in Oceanside, California, USA, on 20 June 2026. However, the fight was cancelled just three days before it was due to take place when Canoy failed to obtain a visa to enter the United States.

== Professional boxing record ==
34 fights	26 wins	5 losses
By knockout	15	2
By decision	11	3
Draws	2	
No contests	1	

No.	Result	Record	Opponent	Type	Round, time	Date	Location	Notes
34	Win	26–5–2 (1)	Remark Antaran	UD	6	11 Oct 2026	Villa Kristen Resort and Hotel, General Santos, Philippines	
33	Win	25–5–2 (1)	Pablito Balidio	UD	6	13 Mar 2026	Barangay Sinaragan, Matanao, Philippines	
32	Win	24–5–2 (1)	Minh Phat Sam	TKO	10 (10), 2:56	27 Apr 2025	Venue 88, General Santos, Philippines	Won vacant WBC International mini-flyweight title
31	Win	23–5–2 (1)	Ariston Aton	UD	8	27 Dec 2024	Kalamansig, Sultan Kudarat, Philippines	
30	Win	22–5–2 (1)	Jonathan Refugio	RTD	5 (12), 3:00	30 Aug 2024	Polomolok Gym, Polomolok, Philippines	Won vacant WBA Asia mini-flyweight title
29	Win	21–5–2 (1)	Pablito Balidio	KO	1 (8), 1:40	11 Jul 2024	Sunken Arena Covered Grounds, Malungon, Philippines	
28	Win	20–5–2 (1)	Clyde Azarcon	TKO	4 (8), 2:08	12 Jul 2023	Malungon, Sarangani, Philippines	
27	Win	19–5–2 (1)	Kenichi Horikawa	TKO	7 (12), 1:01	4 Dec 2022	EDION Arena, Osaka, Japan	Won vacant OPBF light-flyweight title
26	Win	18–5–2 (1)	Ryan Makiputin	TKO	4 (6), 2:04	24 Aug 2022	Sanman Gym, General Santos, Philippines	
25	Draw	17–5–2 (1)	ArAr Andales	MD	12	9 Apr 2022	Rizal, Laguna, Philippines	For WBO Oriental mini-flyweight title
24	Win	17–5–1 (1)	Michael Camelion	UD	6	29 Oct 2021	Sanman Gym, General Santos, Philippines	
23	Loss	16–5–1 (1)	Nhlanhla Tyirha	UD	10	21 May 2021	International Convention Centre, East London, South Africa	For vacant WBA Inter-Continental light-flyweight title
22	Win	16–4–1 (1)	Jovab Lucas	RTD	3 (6), 3:00	21 Nov 2020	Sanman Gym, General Santos, Philippines	
21	Loss	15–4–1 (1)	Nkosinathi Joyi	UD	12	16 Dec 2019	International Convention Centre, East London, South Africa	For vacant IBO mini-flyweight title
20	Win	15–3–1 (1)	Ryan Makiputin	KO	3 (8), 2:18	11 Jul 2019	Sunken Arena Covered Ground, Malungon, Philippines	
19	NC	14–3–1 (1)	Simphiwe Khonco	NC	4 (12)	2 Dec 2018	Orient Theatre, East London, South Africa	IBO mini-flyweight title at stake; Fight stopped due to a cut on Khonco caused by an accidental headbutt
18	Win	14–3–1	Rodel Tejares	TKO	3 (8), 2:27	21 Jan 2018	Gaisano Mall Atrium of General Santos City, General Santos, Philippines	
17	Win	13–3–1	Melvin Jerusalem	UD	10	8 Jul 2017	IEC Convention Center, Cebu City, Philippines	
16	Loss	12–3–1	Hekkie Budler	RTD	7 (12), 3:00	4 Feb 2017	Emperors Palace, Kempton Park, South Africa	For vacant IBO light-flyweight title
15	Win	12–2–1	Toto Landero	TKO	6 (10), 2:45	3 Sep 2016	Jurado Hall of the Philippine Marine Corp., Taguig, Philippines	
14	Win	11–2–1	Fabio Marfa	TKO	4 (6), 1:49	24 Apr 2016	Wilfredo Cabalse Sports Complex, Cebu City, Philippines	
13	Loss	10–2–1	Jesse Espinas	TKO	5 (10), 1:22	12 Jan 2016	Barangay Tablon Gymnasium (Covered Court), Cagayan de Oro, Philippines	Lost ABF mini-flyweight title
12	Win	10–1–1	Rodel Tejares	TKO	8 (12), 1:38	23 Aug 2015	Punta Princesa Atillo Gym, Cebu City, Philippines	Won vacant ABF mini-flyweight title
11	Win	9–1–1	Jonathan Ricablanca	UD	6	12 Jun 2015	L'Fisher Hotel, La Proa Ballroom, Bacolod, Philippines	
10	Loss	8–1–1	Jerry Tomogdan	MD	10	12 Jan 2015	Barangay Tablon Gymnasium (Covered Court), Cagayan de Oro, Philippines	For vacant PBF mini-flyweight title
9	Win	8–0–1	Lyster Jun Pronco	UD	10	11 Nov 2014	Maasin City Sports Complex (Maasin City Gym), Maasin, Philippines	
8	Win	7–0–1	Jessie James Boyles	UD	6	20 Sep 2014	Talisay City Sports Complex, Talisay, Philippines	
7	Win	6–0–1	JR Salvador	UD	8	2 Aug 2014	Tabunoc Sports Complex, Talisay, Philippines	
6	Win	5–0–1	Mark Anthony Florida	UD	8	3 May 2014	Cebu City Waterfront Hotel & Casino, Cebu City, Philippines	
5	Draw	4–0–1	Felipe Cagubcob Jr.	SD	6	11 Jan 2014	Barangay. Namayan Basketball Arena, Mandaluyong, Philippines	
4	Win	4–0	Jherald Tuyor	TKO	4 (6), 0:12	30 Sep 2013	Siquijor Capital Square, Siquijor, Philippines	
3	Win	3–0	Marwin Cristota	TKO	4 (6), 2:59	1 Aug 2013	Cebu City Waterfront Hotel & Casino, Cebu City, Philippines	
2	Win	2–0	Keith Batolenyo	TKO	1 (6), 1:12	9 Mar 2013	Panphil B. Frasco Memorial Sports Complex, Liloan, Philippines	
1	Win	1–0	Garry Rojo	UD	4	2 Dec 2012	Mandaue City Sports and Cultural Complex, Mandaue, Philippines	
