= Rey Loreto =

Filipino boxer

Personal information
- Nickname: Hitman
- Nationality: Filipino
- Born: Johnrey Dandal Loreto; November 10, 1990 (age 35) La Trinidad, Benguet, Philippines
- Weight: Mini flyweight Light flyweight

Boxing career
- Stance: Southpaw

Boxing record
- Total fights: 40
- Wins: 25
- Win by KO: 17
- Losses: 15

Johnrey Dandal Loreto (born 11 March 1997) who goes by his ring name Rey Loreto is a Filipino professional boxer who held the IBO Light flyweight title, he also challenged for the WBA Mini flyweight title once.

== Professional career ==
=== Early career ===
During Loreto's early days at professional boxing, Loreto took a journeyman approach, dealing with four decision losses before prevailing against Benjie Bartolome via stoppage.

Loreto amassed a record that would make him look like a rather "Tomato can" opponent of 8 victories and 7 defeats (8–7) before fighting an undefeated Thai prospect and subsequent world title-challenger, Yodgoen Tor Chalermchai/Yodgoen CP Freshmart for the WBC Youth mini flyweight title which he had a close fight against, with all the judges scoring 96-94 for Yodgoen Tor Chalermchai.

=== Loreto vs. Kokietgym ===
Two months after falling short against Tor Chalermchai, Loreto faced another undefeated Thai prospect Paipharob Kokietgym, this time for the PABA belt, Kokietgym would make Loreto taste his first knockout-loss with Loreto being defeated in the second round of their scheduled 12-rounder bout.

=== Loreto vs. Chimsunthom ===
A Loreto who just came from 4 losses streak tried again for a PABA championship, now at light flyweight division, against veteran Phissanu Chimsunthom whom had a record of 38–7–2, this time is different, Loreto pulled off a huge upset despite seeming like a huge underdog, pulling off a KO victory in the middle of the 12-rounder bout.

=== Loreto vs. Alolod 2 ===
After facing Chimsunthom, Loreto would take a sudden approach of fighting Journymen and was able to compose a better and new record of 16–12, latest fight being a TKO victory against journeyman Sherwin McDo Lungay, on March 16, 2013, Loreto would have a rematch against Benezer Alolod for Alolod's WBC International light flyweight title, the fight ended in a Technical decision attributable to an accidental headbutt occurring that caused a cut on Loreto's eyebrow, the fight ended in a split decision victory for Alolod (67–66, 68–65 and 66–67).

=== Loreto vs. Joyi 1 and 2 ===
Prior to the Alolod defeat, Loreto would pull off another upset against Thai Pornsawan Porpramook via technical decision victory, subsequently, Loreto would earn a title shot from the minor yet rather famous world boxing organization, International Boxing Organization, for the vacant IBO strap at light flyweight division against skilled Nkosinathi Joyi at Monte-Carlo Sporting, Monaco under the Golovkin-Osumano card, Loreto would pull off another set-back upset as he made the referee jump in and halt the contest, stopping Joyi in the 3rd round, prevailing victorious, earning the IBO world title, ending up a contender for the KO of the Year for the year 2014.

Loreto made a tune-up fight against Indonesia Heri Amol before defending his IBO strap against Joyi once again, on March 23, 2015, like before, Loreto stops Joyi again, this time on Joyi's hometown crowd swiftly, ending in the first round, however, an incident would happen as a South African boxing promoter would fails to pay him the $42,000 prize, over a course of 17 days, Loreto and GAB would file a complaint.

=== Loreto vs. CP Freshmart ===
Loreto would let go of his IBO title and moved down weight, fighting a more less experienced boxers, two of which are debutants, however his rankings on WBA are still high, eventually, he earned a shot against the Regular WBA mini flyweight champion Knockout CP Freshmart at Chonburi City Hall Ground, Thailand, his biggest and most challenging fight yet. Loreto falters in bid as he went down in the 10th round en route to a unanimous decision loss, Loreto who was once called a Thai killer experienced a loss against a Thai foe, which he has not for a long time.

=== Retirement ===
After losing to CP Freshmart, Loreto knocked out two more opponents before fighting the subsequent one of the world champion of Japan, Ginjiro Shigeoka for the WBO Asia Pacific mini flyweight title, Loreto who sought to make one great final blow for his career, falls short as Shigeoka overpowered him with a dominant power, ending in an eye-catching left cross KO loss in the fifth round, second KO loss for Loreto and fifth victory for Shigeoka, afterwards, Loreto would later retire.

== Professional boxing record ==
40 fights	25 wins	15 losses
By knockout	17	2
By decision	7	13
By disqualification	1	0

No.	Result	Record	Opponent	Type	Round, time	Date	Location	Notes
40	Loss	25–15	Ginjiro Shigeoka	KO	5 (12), 2:13	31 Dec 2019	Ota City General Gymnasium, Tokyo, Japan	For WBO Asia Pacific mini flyweight title
39	Win	25–14	Songkan Meechai	TKO	1 (8), 2:58	19 May 2019	Kiatkririn Fitness & Martial Art, Bang Phli, Thailand	
38	Win	24–14	Arnold Garde	KO	4 (8), 1:12	17 Feb 2018	Gaisano City Mall, Bacolod, Philippines	
37	Loss	23–14	Knockout CP Freshmart	UD	12	15 Jul 2017	City Hall Ground, Chonburi, Thailand	For WBA mini flyweight title
36	Win	23–13	Weerachad Srisuk	TKO	3 (10)	19 Aug 2016	Bangkok University, Thonburi Campus, Bangkok, Thailand	
35	Win	22–13	Koji Itagaki	TKO	4 (10), 2:03	24 Apr 2016	Marina Hop, Hiroshima, Japan	
34	Win	21–13	Fapikat Twins Gym	KO	1 (6)	22 Jan 2016	Ambassador Hotel, Bangkok, Thailand	
33	Win	20–13	Nkosinathi Joyi	TKO	1 (12), 1:46	22 Mar 2015	Mdantsane Indoor Centre, Mdantsane, South Africa	Retained IBO light flyweight title
32	Win	19–13	Heri Amol	TKO	7 (10), 2:32	11 Oct 2014	Almendras Gym, Davao City, Philippines	
31	Win	18–13	Nkosinathi Joyi	KO	3 (12), 0:49	1 Feb 2014	Salle des Étoiles, Monte Carlo, Monaco	Won vacant IBO light flyweight title
30	Win	17–13	Pornsawan Porpramook	TD	10 (12), 1:01	23 Aug 2013	Siam Park, Bangkok, Thailand	PABA Interim light flyweight title at stake; Unanimous TD after Porpramook right eyebrow cut by an accidental headbutt
29	Loss	16–13	Benezer Alolod	TD	7 (12), 1:51	16 Mar 2013	PAGCOR Grand Theater, Airport Casino Filipino, Parañaque, Philippines	WBC International light flyweight title at stake; Split TD after Loreto eyebrow cut by an accidental headbutt
28	Win	16–12	Sherwin McDo Lungay	TKO	3 (8), 2:06	5 Feb 2013	LDB Sports Arena, Mangilar Sur, Candelaria, Philippines	
27	Loss	15–12	Atsushi Kakutani	UD	8	3 Mar 2012	Sumiyoshi Ward Center, Osaka, Japan	
26	Win	15–11	Roy Albaera	KO	1 (8), 1:29	16 Jun 2012	Angono Municipal Gymnasium, Angono, Rizal, Philippines	
25	Win	14–11	Erwin Picardal	RTD	2 (6), 3:00	11 Mar 2012	Barangay Addition Hills, Mandaluyong, Philippines	
24	Win	13–11	Randy Gomez	UD	6	22 Dec 2011	Almendras Gym, Davao City, Philippines	
23	Win	12–11	Erwin Picardal	UD	4	26 Nov 2011	Barangay Tejeres Convention Center, Rosario, Philippines	
22	Win	11–11	Iriel Alapormina	TKO	3 (4), 2:38	16 Oct 2011	La Trinidad Municipal Gymnasium, La Trinidad, Philippines	
21	Win	10–11	Jonathan Ricablanca	DQ	4 (8), 2:10	16 Sep 2011	Bislig, Surigao del Sur, Philippines	Ricablanca disqualified for repeated low blows
20	Win	9–11	Phissanu Chimsunthom	KO	6 (12), 2:10	28 Jun 2011	The Chaleena Hotel Bangkok, Bangkok, Thailand	Won PABA light flyweight title
19	Loss	8–11	John Paul Bautista	SD	8	18 Jun 2011	Ynares Plaza Gymnasium (Covered Court), Binangonan, Philippines	
18	Loss	8–10	Noknoi Sitthiprasert	UD	6	27 May 2011	Nihon Machi, Sukhumvit Soi 26, Bangkok, Thailand	
17	Loss	8–9	Paipharob Kokietgym	KO	2 (12), 1:25	11 Mar 2011	Pak Klong Village Office, Pathio, Thailand	For PABA mini flyweight title
16	Loss	8–8	Yodgoen CP Freshmart	UD	10	28 Jan 2011	Khao Thong Temple, Phayukha Khiri, Thailand	For WBC Youth mini flyweight title
15	Win	8–7	Benezer Alolod	UD	8	21 Dec 2010	Allen Coliseum, Allen, Philippines	
14	Win	7–7	Jomar Elorde	TKO	5 (10), 1:33	2 Oct 2010	The Flash Grand Ballroom of the Elorde Sports Complex, Parañaque, Philippines	
13	Loss	6–7	Jason Canoy Manigos	UD	10	26 Jun 2010	Bagumbayan Sports Complex, Barangay Bagumbayan, Taguig City, Philippines	
12	Loss	6–6	Mating Kilakil	UD	8	29 May 2010	CCDC Gym, Barangay Poblacion, La Trinidad, Philippines	
11	Win	6–5	Roque Lauro	UD	8	19 Feb 2010	Balibago Sports Complex, Balibago, Santa Rosa City, Philippines	
10	Win	5–5	Brian Diano	UD	8	26 Dec 2009	Barangay Subic, Agoncillo, Philippines	
9	Win	4–5	Salvador Layson	TKO	2 (6), 2:55	5 Dec 2009	Barangay Bulaon, San Fernando City, Philippines	
8	Loss	3–5	Salvador Layson	MD	6	13 Nov 2009	Barangay Bulihan, Malolos, Philippines	
7	Win	3–4	Leonardo Talisic	TKO	5 (6), 1:29	26 Sep 2009	La Trinidad Municipal Gymnasium, La Trinidad, Philippines	
6	Win	2–4	Joebert Marano	UD	4	4 Sep 2009	Santa Rosa Sports Complex, Santa Rosa City, Philippines	
5	Win	1–4	Benjie Bartolome	TKO	4 (4), 1:41	12 Jun 2009	La Trinidad Municipal Gymnasium, La Trinidad, Philippines	
4	Loss	0–4	Dave Maningkil	UD	4	13 Dec 2008	Rizal Park, Davao City, Philippines	
3	Loss	0–3	Rey Mercado	UD	4	25 Nov 2008	Midsayap Municipal Gym, Barangay Poblacion 6, Midsayap, Philippines	
2	Loss	0–2	Rey Mercado	SD	4	21 Jun 2008	Midsayap Municipal Gym, Barangay Poblacion 6, Midsayap, Philippines	
1	Loss	0–1	Ryan Makiputin	UD	4	7 Jun 2008	Almendras Gym, Davao City, Philippines	

== Titles in boxing ==
=== Minor world titles ===
- IBO light flyweight champion (108 lbs)

=== Regional titles ===
- PABA light flyweight champion (108 lbs)

=== Interim regional titles ===
- Interim PABA light flyweight champion (108 lbs)

== See also ==
- List of IBO world champions
- List of IBO light flyweight world champion
- History of boxing in the Philippines
