= Hekkie Budler =

South African boxer (born 1988)

Personal information
- Nickname: The Hexecutioner
- Born: Hector Budler; 18 May 1988 (age 38) Johannesburg, Gauteng, South Africa
- Height: 5 ft 3 in (160 cm)
- Weight: Mini flyweight; Light flyweight

Boxing career
- Reach: 65 1/2 in (166 cm)
- Stance: Orthodox

Boxing record
- Total fights: 40
- Wins: 35
- Win by KO: 11
- Losses: 5

Hector "Hekkie" Budler (born 18 May 1988) is a South African former professional boxer. He has held world championships in two weight classes, including the World Boxing Association (WBA) and International Boxing Organization (IBO) minimumweight titles between 2011 and 2016, and the unified WBA (Super), International Boxing Federation (IBF), and Ring magazine light-flyweight titles in 2018.

== Professional career ==
=== IBO light-flyweight champion ===
Budler was scheduled to fight Juanito Rubillar for the vacant IBO light-flyweight title on February 27, 2010, at the Emperors Palace in Kempton Park. He won the closely contested fight by majority decision. Judges Lulama Mtya and Deon Dwarte scored the fight 117-113 and 115-113 for Budler, while judge Isaac Tshabalala scored the fight as a 114–114 draw.

The close nature of their first meeting prompted IBO to scheduled the rematch between Budler and Rubillar as Budler's first title defense. The bout was scheduled for August 14, 2010 at the Emperors Palace in Kempton Park. Notably, only one South African was named for the three-man panel that would judge the rematch. Budler was once again victorious, as he was awarded the split decision. Two of the judges scored the fight 115-113 and 116-111 for Budler, while the third judge scored the fight 114-113 for Rubillar. Rubbilar was penalized a point in the sixth round for a low blow and was warned about a possible disqualification for low blows in the eight round. From that point onward, Budler began to take over the fight and won the last three rounds.

Budler was scheduled to face Evaristo Primero in a non-title bout on August 14, 2010, at the Sames Auto Arena in Laredo, Texas. The fight was Budler's first in United States and was the first time that one of his bouts was televised in the United States. Budler failed to impress in the fight, although he won by split decision, with scores of 96–94, 98-92 and 93–97.

Budler was scheduled to make the second defense of his title against the former IBO minimumweight champion Gideon Buthelezi on January 27, 2011, at the Emperors Palace in Kempton Park. Budler lost the fight by split decision. One judge scored the fight 117-113 for Budler, while the remaining two judges scored it 118-114 and 115-113 for Buthelezi.

=== Minimumweight champion ===
==== IBO minimumweight champion ====
After losing his IBO light flyweight title, Budler moved down in weight to minimumweight. For his first fight in a new weight class, Budler was scheduled to face the journeyman Luyanda Nkwankwa on May 29, 2011. He won the fight by a fourth-round knockout.

Budler was scheduled to fight Michael Landero for the vacant IBO minimumweight title on September 24, 2011. He won the fight by a unanimous decision.

Budler was scheduled to face Shamila Kortman in a non-title bout on March 26, 2012. He won the eight round bout by unanimous decision, with two judges awarding him almost every round of the fight (79-74 and 78–74), while the third judge scored it as a surprising 79–78. Bulder once again failed to impress against over-matched opposition, with one outlet stating that "neither fighter showed any decent boxing skills".

Budler was scheduled to make his first title defense against the former IBF Minimumweight World Champion Florante Condes on September 22, 2012. He won the fight by unanimous decision, with scores of 116–112, 118-110 and 115–113. Budler spent the majority of the fight on the backfoot, scoring points with straight pushes, while Condes was unable to successfully pressure the champion.

Budler was scheduled to face Renan Trongco in his second IBO minimumweight title defense on February 16, 2013. Trongco stepped in as a short notice replacement Merlito Sabillo, who withdrew from the bout with a hand injury. Budler won the fight by a wide unanimous decision, with two judges scoring the fight 117–111, while the third judge scored it 118–110.

Budler was scheduled to fight the former IBF and IBO mini flyweight champion Nkosinathi Joyi on June 15, 2013. He won the fight by split decision, outscoring his fellow South African on two of the judges scorecards. Judge Tony Nyangiwe awarded him a 115-113 scorecard, judge Reg Thomson awarded him a 116-113 scorecard, while the judge Arthur Ellensohn scored the fight 116-112 for Joyi.

==== IBO and WBA minimumweight champion ====
Budler was scheduled to face Hugo Hernan Verchelli on November 9, 2013. The fight was simultaneously a fight for the vacant WBA interim minimumweight title, as well as an IBO minimumweight title defense. Budler won the fight by a fourth-round stoppage. He knocked Verchelli down three times before the 2:30 minute mark: the first time with a left hook, the second and third time with a body shot.

Budler was scheduled to fight Karluis Diaz for the IBO minimumweight and vacant WBA minimumweight title on March 1, 2014. Budler notched the quickest victory of his career, flooring Diaz with an overhand right at the 2:59 minute mark.

Budler was scheduled to make his first title defense as a double-champion against Vicha Phulaikaw on June 21, 2014. Budler scored his third consecutive stoppage victory, stopping Vicha in the eight round. The knockout was preceded by two knockdowns, one each in the first and eight rounds.

Budler was scheduled to made his second title defense as a double-champion against the Xiong Chaozhong on October 25, 2014. He won the fight by unanimous decision, with scores of 114–112, 114-112 and 118–108. Each fighter scored a knockdown in the second round.

Budler was scheduled to defend his world titles against the Mexican Jesús Silvestre on February 21, 2015. The fight was set for the Gennady Golovkin and Martin Murray undercard. Budler won the fight by unanimous decision, with two judges awarding him a 115-112 scorecard, while the third judge awarded him a wider 117-110 scorecard.

Budler was scheduled to defend his two world titles for the third time against Simphiwe Khonco on September 19, 2015. He won the fight by unanimous decision, with scores of 117–111, 115-113 and 116–112.

Budler was scheduled to defend his titles against Byron Rojas on March 19, 2016. The fact that the bout was contested in South Africa, as well as the fact that Rojas hadn't faced the same level of opposition as Budler, resulted in Rojas coming into the fight as an underdog. Rojas won the fight by unanimous decision, with all three judges scoring the fight 115–113 in his favor.

=== Return to light-flyweight ===
==== IBO light-flyweight champion ====
After suffering his first loss in nearly six years, Budler was scheduled to face Siyabonga Siyo for the vacant WBA Pan-African light-flyweight title on October 22, 2016. It was his first fight at light flyweight since his loss to Gideon Buthelezi on January 27, 2011. Budler beat Siyo by unanimous decision, with scores of 116–112, 116-112 and 118–110. He remained in control for the duration of the bout, successfully countering anytime Siyo tried to get on the inside.

Budler was scheduled to fight Joey Canoy for the vacant IBO light-flyweight title on February 4, 2017. Budler notched his first stoppage victory in two years, after Canoy retired from the fight at the end of the seventh round.

Budler was scheduled to challenge the reigning IBF light flyweight champion Milan Melindo on September 16, 2017. It was one of his rare fights outside of South Africa, as it was contested at the Waterfront Hotel & Casino in Cebu City, Philippines. Melindo won the closely contested, high paced bout by split decision. Two judges awarded Melindo a 117-110 and 115-112 scorecard, while the third judge scored it 115-113 for Budler.

==== Unified light flyweight champion ====
Budler was scheduled to challenge the unified WBA (Super), IBF, and The Ring light-flyweight titlist Ryoichi Taguchi on May 20, 2018. Despite coming into the fight as an underdog, Budler won the fight by unanimous decision, with all three judges scoring the bout 114–113 in his favor. Taguchi failed to make use of his height and reach advantage, as Budler successfully outboxed him utilizing outfighting tactics. Budler became the first South African to win three world titles simultaneously, the first African to win the Ring Magazine belt, and the first South African under the new Boxing SA (BSA) Act of 2001 to win the Ring Magazine title.

In June 2021, IBF ordered Budler to make a mandatory defense against Felix Alvarado. As the two sides were unable to come to an agreement, the fight went to a purse bid. Sampson Boxing won with a bid of $25 000. with a split of 75% to Budler and 25% to Alvarado. Budler subsequently vacated the title, stating: "The purse money I was offered to defend was not good".

Budler was scheduled to make his first title defense as a unified title holder against Hiroto Kyoguchi on December 31, 2018, at the Wynn Palace in Macau. The fight was on the undercard of the Donnie Nietes and Kazuto Ioka main event. Despite his status as the reigning champion, Budler came into the fight as an underdog. Kyoguchi won the fight by a tenth-round technical knockout. Budler claimed he had trouble properly breathing in the fight, as he was having sinus issues going into the fight.

=== Post title reign ===
Budler was scheduled to face Jonathan Almacen for the vacant WBC Silver light-flyweight title on May 22, 2021. It was Budler's first fight since losing to Kyoguchi on December 31, 2018, almost three years prior. He won the fight by a wide unanimous decision, with scores of 118–111, 118-111 and 117–111.

Budler was scheduled to face Elwin Soto in the main event of a TV Azteca broadcast card on June 25, 2022, at the Palenque del FEX in Mexicali, Mexico in a WBC light flyweight title eliminator. Bulder won the fight by unanimous decision, with all three judges scoring the bout 114–113 in his favor. He landed the sole knockdown of the fight in the twelfth round, which proved to be the decisive moment of the fight, as he would have lost the fight otherwise.

On November 9, 2022, the reigning WBC, The Ring and WBA (Super) champion Kenshiro Teraji was ordered to make a mandatory title defense against Budler. Budler accepted an undisclosed step-aside fee on January 11, 2023, to allow Teraji to face the WBO light flyweight champion Jonathan González in a title unification bout. Although the fight was agreed to take place on April 8, González withdrew from the bout on March 24, due to mycoplasma pneumonia. Budler beat Wichet Sengprakhon by a first-round knockout on May 5, 2023, after which the WBC once again ordered Teraji to face him in a mandatory title defense. He challenged Teraji on September 18, 2023, at the Ariake Arena in Tokyo, Japan. Budler lost the fight by a ninth-round technical knockout.

== Professional boxing record ==
| 40 fights | 35 wins | 5 losses |
|---|---|---|
| By knockout | 11 | 2 |
| By decision | 24 | 3 |

| No. | Result | Record | Opponent | Type | Round, time | Date | Location | Notes |
|---|---|---|---|---|---|---|---|---|
| 40 | Loss | 35–5 | Kenshiro Teraji | TKO | 9 (12), 2:19 | 18 Sep 2023 | Ariake Arena, Tokyo, Japan | For WBA (Super), WBC, and The Ring light-flyweight titles |
| 39 | Win | 35–4 | Wichet Sengprakhon | KO | 1 (10), 0:43 | 5 May 2023 | Unisa Hall, Johannesburg, South Africa | |
| 38 | Win | 34–4 | Elwin Soto | UD | 12 | 25 Jun 2022 | Palenque del FEX, Mexicali, Mexico | |
| 37 | Win | 33–4 | Jonathan Almacen | UD | 12 | 22 May 2021 | Booysens Hall, Johannesburg, South Africa | Won vacant WBC Silver light-flyweight title |
| 36 | Loss | 32–4 | Hiroto Kyoguchi | TKO | 10 (12), 0:16 | 31 Dec 2018 | Wynn Palace, Macau, SAR | Lost WBA (Super) and The Ring light-flyweight titles |
| 35 | Win | 32–3 | Ryoichi Taguchi | UD | 12 | 20 May 2018 | Ota City General Gymnasium, Tokyo, Japan | Won WBA (Super), IBF, and The Ring light-flyweight titles |
| 34 | Loss | 31–3 | Milan Melindo | SD | 12 | 16 Sep 2017 | Waterfront Hotel & Casino, Cebu City, Philippines | For IBF light-flyweight title |
| 33 | Win | 31–2 | Joey Canoy | RTD | 8 (12), 3:00 | 4 Feb 2017 | Emperors Palace, Kempton Park, South Africa | Won vacant IBO light-flyweight title |
| 32 | Win | 30–2 | Siyabonga Siyo | UD | 12 | 22 Oct 2016 | Emperors Palace, Kempton Park, South Africa | |
| 31 | Loss | 29–2 | Byron Rojas | UD | 12 | 19 Mar 2016 | Emperors Palace, Kempton Park, South Africa | Lost WBA and IBO minimumweight titles |
| 30 | Win | 29–1 | Simphiwe Khonco | UD | 12 | 19 Sep 2015 | Emperors Palace, Kempton Park, South Africa | Retained WBA and IBO minimumweight titles |
| 29 | Win | 28–1 | Jesús Silvestre | UD | 12 | 21 Feb 2015 | Salle des etoiles, Monte Carlo, Monaco | Retained WBA and IBO minimumweight titles |
| 28 | Win | 27–1 | Xiong Chaozhong | UD | 12 | 25 Oct 2014 | Salle des etoiles, Monte Carlo, Monaco | Retained WBA and IBO minimumweight titles |
| 27 | Win | 26–1 | Vicha Phulaikaw | KO | 8 (12), 1:06 | 21 Jun 2014 | Monte Carlo Casino, Monte Carlo, Monaco | Retained WBA and IBO minimumweight titles |
| 26 | Win | 25–1 | Karluis Diaz | KO | 1 (12), 2:59 | 1 Mar 2014 | Emperors Palace, Kempton Park, South Africa | Retained IBO minimumweight title; Won vacant WBA minimumweight title |
| 25 | Win | 24–1 | Hugo Hernan Verchelli | TKO | 4 (12), 2:29 | 9 Nov 2013 | Emperors Palace, Kempton Park, South Africa | Retained IBO minimumweight title; Won vacant WBA interim minimumweight title |
| 24 | Win | 23–1 | Nkosinathi Joyi | SD | 12 | 15 Jun 2013 | Emperors Palace, Kempton Park, South Africa | Retained IBO minimumweight title |
| 23 | Win | 22–1 | Renan Trongco | UD | 12 | 16 Feb 2013 | Emperors Palace, Kempton Park, South Africa | Retained IBO minimumweight title |
| 22 | Win | 21–1 | Florante Condes | UD | 12 | 22 Sep 2012 | Emperors Palace, Kempton Park, South Africa | Retained IBO minimumweight title |
| 21 | Win | 20–1 | Shamila Kortman | UD | 8 | 26 Mar 2012 | Emperors Palace, Kempton Park, South Africa | |
| 20 | Win | 19–1 | Michael Landero | UD | 12 | 24 Sep 2011 | Emperors Palace, Kempton Park, South Africa | Won vacant IBO minimumweight title |
| 19 | Win | 18–1 | Luyanda Nkwankwa | KO | 4 (6), 2:26 | 29 May 2011 | Orient Theatre, East London, South Africa | |
| 18 | Loss | 17–1 | Gideon Buthelezi | SD | 12 | 27 Jan 2011 | Emperors Palace, Kempton Park, South Africa | Lost IBO light-flyweight title |
| 17 | Win | 17–0 | Evaristo Primero | SD | 10 | 14 Aug 2010 | Energy Arena, Laredo, Texas, U.S. | |
| 16 | Win | 16–0 | Juanito Rubillar | SD | 12 | 19 Jun 2010 | Emperors Palace, Kempton Park, South Africa | Retained IBO light-flyweight title |
| 15 | Win | 15–0 | Juanito Rubillar | MD | 12 | 27 Feb 2010 | Emperors Palace, Kempton Park, South Africa | Won vacant IBO light-flyweight title |
| 14 | Win | 14–0 | Motswaki Moselesele | KO | 1 (12), 2:47 | 31 Oct 2009 | Emperors Palace, Kempton Park, South Africa | Retained IBO All-Africa light-flyweight title |
| 13 | Win | 13–0 | Doctor Ntsele | UD | 12 | 29 Sep 2009 | Emperors Palace, Kempton Park, South Africa | Retained IBO All-Africa light-flyweight title |
| 12 | Win | 12–0 | Khanyakude Mukansi | UD | 8 | 11 Jul 2009 | Emperors Palace, Kempton Park, South Africa | |
| 11 | Win | 11–0 | Charity Mukondeleli | PTS | 12 | 2 Apr 2009 | Emperors Palace, Kempton Park, South Africa | Won vacant IBO All-Africa light-flyweight title |
| 10 | Win | 10–0 | Ronald Parks | PTS | 6 | 29 Nov 2008 | Wembley Indoor Arena, Johannesburg, South Africa | |
| 9 | Win | 9–0 | Dalisizwe Komani | TKO | 6 (6) | 13 Sep 2008 | Emperors Palace, Kempton Park, South Africa | |
| 8 | Win | 8–0 | Ronald Parks | PTS | 6 | 15 Jul 2008 | Emperors Palace, Kempton Park, South Africa | |
| 7 | Win | 7–0 | Loyiso Ngantweni | PTS | 6 | 30 May 2008 | Birchwood Hotel, Boksburg, South Africa | |
| 6 | Win | 6–0 | Khanyakude Mukansi | PTS | 6 | 29 Apr 2008 | Emperors Palace, Kempton Park, South Africa | |
| 5 | Win | 5–0 | Sibusiso Twani | PTS | 6 | 2 Feb 2008 | Emperors Palace, Kempton Park, South Africa | |
| 4 | Win | 4–0 | Mario Gaxiola | UD | 4 | 28 Dec 2007 | River Rock Casino Resort, Richmond, British Columbia, Canada | |
| 3 | Win | 3–0 | Sibusiso Ngqalathi | TKO | 2 (4) | 12 Nov 2007 | Emperors Palace, Kempton Park, South Africa | |
| 2 | Win | 2–0 | Petros Mahlangu | TKO | 1 (4) | 17 Sep 2007 | Emperors Palace, Kempton Park, South Africa | |
| 1 | Win | 1–0 | Michael Sediane | TKO | 1 (4) | 5 Jul 2007 | Emperors Palace, Kempton Park, South Africa | |

== Titles in boxing ==
=== Major world titles ===
- WBA minimumweight champion (105 lbs)
- IBF light-flyweight champion (108 lbs)
- WBA light-flyweight champion (108 lbs)

=== The Ring magazine titles ===
- The Ring light-flyweight champion (108 lbs)

=== Interim world titles ===
- WBA interim minimumweight champion (105 lbs)

=== Minor world titles ===
- IBO minimumweight champion (105 lbs)
- IBO light-flyweight champion (108 lbs) (2x)

=== Regional/International titles ===
- IBO All-Africa light-flyweight champion (108 lbs)
- WBC Silver light-flyweight champion (108 lbs)

== See also ==
- List of world mini-flyweight boxing champions
- List of world light-flyweight boxing champions

Sporting positions
Regional boxing titles
| New title | IBO All-Africa light-flyweight champion 2 April 2009 – 27 February 2010; Won world title | Title discontinued |
| Vacant Title last held by Jing Xiang | WBC Silver light-flyweight champion 22 May 2021 – 2021; Vacated | Vacant Title next held by Jairo Noriega |
Minor world boxing titles
| Vacant Title last held by Monelisi Myekeni | IBO light-flyweight champion 27 February 2010 – 27 January 2011 | Succeeded by Gideon Buthelezi |
| Vacant Title last held by Gideon Buthelezi | IBO minimumweight champion 24 September 2011 – 19 March 2016; Vacant after loss to Byron Rojas | Vacant Title next held by Simphiwe Khonco |
| Vacant Title last held by Rey Loreto | IBO light-flyweight champion 4 February 2017 – 16 September 2017; Vacant after loss to Milan Melindo | Vacant Title next held by Tibo Monabesa |
Major world boxing titles
| Vacant Title last held by Jesús Silvestre | WBA minimumweight champion Interim title 9 November 2013 – 1 March 2014; Won full title | Vacant Title next held by Knockout CP Freshmart |
| Vacant Title last held by Ryo Miyazaki | WBA minimumweight champion 1 March 2014 – 19 March 2016 | Succeeded by Byron Rojas |
| Preceded by Ryoichi Taguchi | WBA light-flyweight champion Super title 20 May 2018 – 31 December 2018 | Succeeded by Hiroto Kyoguchi |
| Preceded by Ryoichi Taguchi | IBF light-flyweight champion 20 May 2018 – 25 July 2018; Vacated | Vacant Title next held by Felix Alvarado |
| Preceded by Ryoichi Taguchi | The Ring light-flyweight champion 20 May 2018 – 31 December 2018 | Succeeded by Hiroto Kyoguchi |
