= Nkosinathi Joyi =

South African boxer

Personal information
- Nickname: Mabere
- Nationality: South African
- Born: Nkosinathi Joyi; 21 May 1983 (age 43) Mdantsane, South Africa
- Height: 5 ft 6 in (168 cm)
- Weight: Mini flyweight; Light flyweight

Boxing career
- Reach: 67 1/2 in (171 cm)
- Stance: Southpaw

Boxing record
- Total fights: 37
- Wins: 29
- Win by KO: 19
- Losses: 6
- Draws: 1
- No contests: 1

Nkosinathi Joyi (born 1 January 1983 in Mdantsane, South Africa), is a South African professional boxer with a southpaw stance who goes by the nickname of "Mabere". Joyi is the former IBF Minimumweight world champion, he was ranked by BoxRec and The Ring Magazine as the number one boxer in the Minimumweight division. He is also the two-time and current IBO Minimumweight champion.

== Professional career ==
Joyi, who has fought his entire career in South Africa, made his professional debut on 28 April 2002 in Queenstown. He beat Dalisizwe Komani over the six round distance to make a winning start to his career. Joyi won his first minor championship on 24 April 2004, beating Mzikayse Foslare to win the South African minimumweight title.

=== Minimumweight world title ===
The first major fight of his career came on 26 June 2009 in East London, where he fought the Filipino boxer Florante Condes in an IBF Minimumweight title eliminator. Joyi won the fight by a wide unanimous decision with scores of: 120–107 (twice) and 119–108. In his next fight, on 26 March 2010 and also in East London, Joyi challenged for the IBF title against the Mexican Raúl García. Joyi once again gained a unanimous points decision and claimed García's title, the scores were 119–109 (twice) and 118–110. On 29 January 2011, Joyi faced former WBC Minimumweight champion, Katsunari Takayama. Joyi appeared to be in full control of the bout until the third round, when an accidental clash of heads opened a deep cut along Takayama's hairline. Since four rounds had not been completed, the bout was ruled a no-contest. Joyi then defeated Takayama via a unanimous decision in a direct rematch on 30 March 2012 in East London. He had reportedly injured his left hand in the second round of that fight. Joyi's promoter Branco Milenkovic has planned to stage a unification match. However, two of the other three champions of the four major sanctioning bodies were Japanese. Although Japan's reigning world champions have been allowed to fight in a unification match with any champion of the four major sanctioning bodies since 28 February 2011, the WBC's Kazuto Ioka and the WBA's Akira Yaegashi were due to fight in their title unification bout. So, they were unavailable until at least June 2012.

In Joyi's first fight outside of South Africa, he suffered an upset knockout loss at the hands of local fighter Mario Rodriguez (14–6–4) in Sinaloa, Mexico on 1 September 2012.

== Professional boxing record ==
38 fights	29 wins	7 losses
By knockout	19	5
By decision	10	2
Draws	1	
No contests	1	

No.	Result	Record	Opponent	Type	Round, time	Date	Location	Notes
38	Loss	29–7–1 (1)	(Tanzania) Abeid Zugo	KO	4 (12)	21 May 2021	Kemmon Hall, Dar es Salaam, Tanzania	
37	Loss	29–6–1 (1)	(South Africa) Ayanda Ndulani	KO	4 (12), 1:31	21 May 2021	International Convention Centre, East London, South Africa	Joyi was overweight and forfeited the IBO mini-flyweight title regardless of the result
36	Win	29–5–1 (1)	(Philippines) Joey Canoy	UD	12	16 Dec 2019	International Convention Centre, East London, South Africa	Won vacant IBO mini-flyweight title
35	Draw	28–5–1 (1)	(South Africa) Siphamandla Baleni	TD	3 (12), 1:17	27 Jul 2019	International Convention Centre, East London, South Africa	For vacant WBO Global light-flyweight title
34	Win	28–5 (1)	(South Africa) Nhlanhla Tyirha	UD	12	7 Dec 2018	Orient Theatre, East London, South Africa	Retained WBO Africa light-flyweight title
33	Win	27–5 (1)	(South Africa) Mpho Seforo	KO	5 (10), 2:56	7 Dec 2018	Orient Theatre, East London, South Africa	Won vacant WBO Africa light-flyweight title
32	Loss	26–5 (1)	(South Africa) Simphiwe Khonco	UD	12	20 Nov 2016	Orient Theatre, East London, South Africa	For IBO mini-flyweight title
31	Win	26–4 (1)	(South Africa) Luyanda Nkwankwa	PTS	8	22 Apr 2016	(South Africa) Orient Theatre, East London, South London	
30	Win	25–4 (1)	(South Africa) Sinethemba Magibisela	TKO	5 (10), 2:35	4 Sep 2015	Orient Theatre, East London, South Africa	
29	Loss	24–4 (1)	(Philippines) Rey Loreto	TKO	1 (12), 1:46	22 Mar 2015	Mdantsane Indoor Centre, Mdantsane, South Africa	For IBO light-flyweight title
28	Loss	24–3 (1)	(Philippines) Rey Loreto	KO	3 (12), 0:49	1 Feb 2014	Salle des etoiles, Monte Carlo, Monaco	For vacant IBO light-flyweight title
27	Win	24–2 (1)	(Philippines) Benezer Alolod	KO	9 (12), 2:48	31 Aug 2013	Emperor's Palace, Kempton Park, South Africa	Won WBC International light-flyweight title
26	Loss	23–2 (1)	(South Africa) Hekkie Budler	SD	12	15 Jun 2013	Emperor's Palace, Kempton Park, South Africa	For IBO mini-flyweight title
25	Win	23–1 (1)	(Argentina) Walter Rojas	TKO	1 (12), 2:13	8 Dec 2012	Mdantsane Indoor Centre, Mdantsane, South Africa	Won vacant WBA International mini-flyweight title
24	Loss	22–1 (1)	(Mexico) Mario Rodriguez	KO	7 (12), 2:07	1 Sep 2012	Gimnasio Municipal Luis Estrada Medina, Guasave, Mexico	Lost IBF mini-flyweight title
23	Win	22–0 (1)	(Japan) Katsunari Takayama	UD	12	30 Mar 2012	Orient Theatre, East London, South Africa	Retained IBF mini-flyweight title
22	NC	21–0 (1)	(Japan) Katsunari Takayama	NC	3 (12), 1:59	29 Jan 2011	Carnival City, Brakpan, South Africa	IBF mini-flyweight title at stake; NC after Takayama was cut from an accidental head clash
21	Win	21–0	(Mexico) Raúl García	UD	12	26 Mar 2010	International Convention Centre, East London, South Africa	Won IBF mini-flyweight title
20	Win	20–0	(Philippines) Florante Condes	UD	12	26 Jun 2009	Orient Theatre, East London, South Africa	
19	Win	19–0	(Mexico) Lorenzo Trejo	KO	2 (12), 0:48	22 Nov 2008	Mdantsane Indoor Centre, Mdantsane, South Africa	Retained IBO mini-flyweight title
18	Win	18–0	(Mexico) Sammy Gutiérrez	TKO	7 (12)	27 Jun 2008	Orient Theatre, East London, South Africa	Retained IBO mini-flyweight title
17	Win	17–0	(Philippines) Gabriel Pumar	KO	1 (12), 2:31	16 Nov 2007	Great Centenary Hall, Port Elizabeth, South Africa	Retained IBO mini-flyweight title
16	Win	16–0	(Philippines) Armando dela Cruz	KO	2 (12), 1:28	4 Nov 2006	Emperor's Palace, Kempton Park, South Africa	Won vacant IBO mini-flyweight title
15	Win	15–0	(South Africa) Thobani Mbangeni	TKO	2 (12), 1:39	22 Sep 2006	Orient Theatre, East London, South Africa	Retained South African mini-flyweight title
14	Win	14–0	(South Africa) Thulani Ndyamara	TKO	1 (12), 2:58	1 Apr 2006	Orient Theatre, East London, South Africa	Retained South African mini-flyweight title
13	Win	13–0	(South Africa) Mawanda Sineko	KO	6 (12)	29 Oct 2005	Orient Theatre, East London, South Africa	Retained South African mini-flyweight title
12	Win	12–0	(South Africa) Mawanda Sineko	UD	12	5 Mar 2005	Orient Theatre, East London, South Africa	Retained South African mini-flyweight title
11	Win	11–0	(South Africa) Wele Maqolo	UD	12	28 Aug 2004	Orient Theatre, East London, South Africa	Retained South African mini-flyweight title
10	Win	10–0	(South Africa) Khuselekile Gada	TKO	1 (12), 1:59	16 Jul 2004	Great Centenary Hall, Port Elizabeth, South Africa	Retained South African mini-flyweight title
9	Win	9–0	(South Africa) Mzikayse Foslare	TKO	1 (12), 1:32	24 Apr 2004	Orient Theatre, East London, South Africa	Won vacant South African mini-flyweight title
8	Win	8–0	(South Africa) Thembinkosi Blou	TKO	2 (8)	21 Feb 2004	Orient Theatre, East London, South Africa	
7	Win	7–0	(South Africa) Elliot Tokona	TKO	4 (6)	6 Dec 2003	Orient Theatre, East London, South Africa	
6	Win	6–0	(South Africa) Sakhumzi Mqadaru	TKO	2 (6)	2 Aug 2003	Orient Theatre, East London, South Africa	
5	Win	5–0	(South Africa) Mlungiseleli Xokoloshe	UD	10	5 Apr 2003	Orient Theatre, East London, South Africa	
4	Win	4–0	(South Africa) Siyabulela Mejeni	TKO	1 (6)	14 Dec 2002	Mdantsane Indoor Centre, East London, South Africa	
3	Win	3–0	(South Africa) Khuselekile Gada	TKO	2 (6)	24 Aug 2002	Gompo Hall, East London, South Africa	
2	Win	2–0	(South Africa) Makhi Nokhele	TKO	3 (6)	15 Jun 2002	Moses Twebe Hall, Dimbaza, South Africa	
1	Win	1–0	(South Africa) Dalisizwe Komani	PTS	6	28 Apr 2002	Indoor Sports Centre, Queenstown, South Africa	

== See also ==
- List of world mini-flyweight boxing champions

Sporting positions
Minor world boxing titles
Vacant Title last held by Noel Tuñacao	IBO Mini flyweight champion 4 November 2006 – 2009; Vacated	Vacant Title next held by Gideon Buthelezi
Vacant Title last held by Simphiwe Khonco	IBO Mini flyweight champion 16 December 2019 – 20 May 2021; Stripped	Vacant Title next held by Ayanda Ndulani
Major world boxing titles
Preceded by Raúl García	IBF Mini flyweight champion 26 March 2010 – 1 September 2012	Succeeded by Mario Rodríguez
