= Nhlanhla Tyirha =

South African boxer

Personal information
- Nickname: Kilimanjaro
- Nationality: South African
- Born: 1999 (age 26–27) East London, Eastern Cape, South Africa
- Height: 5 ft 2 in (157 cm)
- Weight: Light-flyweight

Boxing career
- Stance: Southpaw

Boxing record
- Total fights: 10
- Wins: 8
- Win by KO: 2
- Losses: 2

Nhlanhla Tyirha is a South African professional boxer, who has held the WBO Global light flyweight title since 2021.

== Professional boxing career ==
Tyirha made his professional debut against Sabelo Nkosi on 17 June 2018. He won the fight on points. Tyirha amassed an undefeated 3–0 record during the next four months, before being booked to challenge Bongani Silila for the South African light flyweight title on 7 December 2018. He captured his first professional title by a third-round knockout.

Following his victory against Silila, Tyirha challenged the reigning WBO Africa light flyweight champion Nkosinathi Joyi on 28 April 2019. He suffered the first loss of his professional career, as Joyi won the fight by unanimous decision, with scores of 116–112, 116–113 and 118–112.

Tyirha faced Joey Canoy for the vacant WBA Inter-continental light flyweight title on 21 May 2021. He won the fight by unanimous decision. Tyirha next faced Jaysever Abcede on 1 October 2021 for another vacant belt, the WBO Global light flyweight title. Despite being knocked down in the opening round, Tyirha rallied back to win the majority of the remaining rounds and capture the title by unanimous decision, with scores of 117–110, 117–110 and 116–111.

Tyirha faced Esneth Domingo (16–1) on 28 May 2022, at the Premier Elicc in East London. He won the fight by unanimous decision, with scores of 97–93, 96–94 and 96–94. Later that same year, on 30 October, Tyirha faced Orlie Silvestre for the vacant IBF Inter-Continental light flyweight title. He captured the vacant belt by unanimous decision, with two scorecards of 119–109 and one scorecard of 120–108.

== Professional boxing record ==
10 fights	8 wins	2 losses
By knockout	2	1
By decision	6	1

No.	Result	Record	Opponent	Type	Round, time	Date	Location	Notes
10	Loss	8–2	George Kandulo	KO	6 (8), 1:57	2 Jul 2023	International Convention Centre, East London, South Africa	
9	Win	8–1	Orlie Silvestre	UD	12	30 Oct 2022	International Convention Centre, East London, South Africa	Won vacant IBF Inter-Continental light-flyweight title
8	Win	7–1	Esneth Domingo	UD	10	28 May 2022	International Convention Centre, East London, South Africa	
7	Win	6–1	Jaysever Abcede	UD	12	1 Oct 2021	International Convention Centre, East London, South Africa	Won vacant WBO Global light-flyweight title
6	Win	5–1	Joey Canoy	UD	10	21 May 2021	International Convention Centre, East London, South Africa	Won vacant WBA Inter-continental light-flyweight title
5	Loss	4–1	Nkosinathi Joyi	UD	12	28 Apr 2019	Orient Theatre, East London, South Africa	For WBO Africa light-flyweight title
4	Win	4–0	Bongani Silila	KO	3 (12), 0:48	7 Dec 2018	Orient Theatre, East London, South Africa	Won South African light-flyweight title
3	Win	3–0	Luyanda Kwankwa	SD	8	12 Oct 2018	Indoor Sports Centre, Mdantsane, South Africa	
2	Win	2–0	Sakhekile Qumba	TKO	1 (6)	27 Jul 2018	International Convention Centre, East London, South Africa	
1	Win	1–0	Sabelo Nkosi	PTS	6	17 Jun 2018	Orient Theatre, East London, South Africa	
