= Ayanda Ndulani =

South African boxer

Personal information
- Nationality: South African
- Born: 4 April 1997 (age 29) East London, Eastern Cape, South Africa
- Weight: Mini flyweight

Boxing career
- Stance: Orthodox

Boxing record
- Total fights: 17
- Wins: 13
- Win by KO: 4
- Losses: 3
- Draws: 1

Ayanda Ndulani (born 4 April 1997) is a South African professional boxer who has held the IBO minimumweight title since 2021.

== Professional boxing career ==
=== Early career ===
Ndulani made his professional debut against Vuyani Swartbooi on 27 June 2015. He won the fight by a fourth-round technical knockout. He amassed a 10–2–1 record during the next four years, before making his first world title challenge.

=== IBO minimumweight champion ===
==== Ndulani vs. Joyi ====
Ndulani was scheduled to challenge the reigning IBO minimumweight champion Nkosinathi Joyi on 21 May 2021, at the International Convention Centre in East London, Eastern Cape. Both fighters came into the bout after a two year absence from the sport, with Ndulani's last fight taking place on 28 September 2019, while Joyi's last fight took place on 16 December 2019. The incumbent champion was regarded as the favorite to retain the title, while Ndulani came in as a moderate underdog and was dubbed a dark horse. Joyi weighed in at 48.10 kg at the official weigh-ins, which was almost 500g above the 47.63 kg limit. Accordingly, he was stripped of the title, leaving Ndulani as the only one eligible to capture the now vacant belt. Ndulani won the fight by a fourth-round knockout. The visibly drained Joyi was knocked down twice in the second round, although he was able to beat the eight count both times. The former champion was once again floored at the 1:31 minute mark of the fourth round, after which the referee decided to stop the fight.

==== The Baleni trilogy ====
Ndulani was booked to make his maiden IBO minimumweight title defense against the former WBO Global and African minimumweight champion Siphamandla Baleni. The bout took place on 26 November 2021, at the International Convention Centre in East London, South Africa. Ndulani won the rematch by split decision, with two judges awarding him a 117–111 and 116–112 scorecards respectively, while the third judge scored it 118–114 for Baleni. Baleni later contested the result of the decision with the IBO, who ruled against him on 18 May 2022, confirming Ndulani as their minimumweight champion.

Despite the IBO ruling, Ndulani chose to give Siphamandla Baleni a second chance at the title. The rematch was one of five titles bouts which were scheduled as part of the annual boxing celebration of former president Nelson Mandela, and was expected to take place on 3 August 2022, at the same venue in which their first bout transpired. On 27 July, Xaba Promotions announced that the bout was postponed due to budgetary constraints, and would be rescheduled for 4 September. Ndulani won the fight by split decision, the same as in their previous encounter.

==== Ndulani vs. Soto ====
On 9 November 2022, during the annual WBC convention, the sanctioning body formally ordered a mini-flyweight title eliminator between Ndulani and Luis Castillo Soto. The fight was expected to take place on 25 February 2023, at the ICC Durban in Durban, South Africa on the undercard of the Michael Mendoza and Landi Ngxeke super flyweight bout, but was postponed as Ngxeke came down with bronchitis. The bout was rescheduled to take place on 31 March 2023, but was removed from the event entirely days before it was supposed to take place, as Ndulani refused to continue his preparations at the event promoter's Xaba Boxing Academy, choosing instead to stay at the Masenze Boxing Club. The title eliminator was rescheduled to take place on 19 May 2023, in Cancun, Mexico. He lost the fight by a fourth-round knockout.

== Professional boxing record ==
| 17 fights | 13 wins | 3 losses |
|---|---|---|
| By knockout | 4 | 2 |
| By decision | 9 | 1 |
| Draws | 1 | |

| No. | Result | Record | Opponent | Type | Round, time | Date | Location | Notes |
|---|---|---|---|---|---|---|---|---|
| 17 | Loss | 13–3–1 | Luis Castillo Soto | KO | 4 (12) | 19 May 2023 | Cancun, Mexico | |
| 16 | Win | 13–2–1 | Siphamandla Baleni | SD | 12 | 4 Sep 2022 | International Convention Centre, East London, Eastern Cape, South Africa | Retained IBO minimumweight title |
| 15 | Win | 12–2–1 | Siphamandla Baleni | SD | 12 | 27 Nov 2021 | International Convention Centre, East London, Eastern Cape, South Africa | Retained IBO minimumweight title |
| 14 | Win | 11–2–1 | Nkosinathi Joyi | KO | 4 (12), 1:31 | 21 May 2021 | International Convention Centre, East London, Eastern Cape, South Africa | Won vacant IBO minimumweight title |
| 13 | Win | 10–2–1 | Loyiso Ngantweni | UD | 10 | 28 Sep 2019 | International Convention Centre, East London, Eastern Cape, South Africa | |
| 12 | Loss | 9–2–1 | Siphamandla Baleni | UD | 12 | 16 Jun 2019 | Indoor Sports Centre, Mdantsane, South Africa | For vacant WBO Africa Minimumweight title |
| 11 | Win | 9–1–1 | Xolisa Magusha | UD | 12 | 29 Jul 2018 | Orient Theatre, East London, Eastern Cape, South Africa | Won vacant African Boxing Union Minimum Title. |
| 10 | Win | 8–1–1 | Khanyiso Siko | PTS | 10 | 29 Apr 2018 | Indoor Sports Centre, Mdantsane, South Africa | Won vacant Eastern Cape mini flyweight title. |
| 9 | Win | 7–1–1 | Daluxolo Mangcotywa | PTS | 4 | 10 Dec 2017 | Orient Theatre, East London, Eastern Cape, South Africa | |
| 8 | Win | 6–1–1 | Thandolwethu Hlangani | TKO | 3 (6), 1:03 | 30 Jul 2017 | Orient Theatre, East London, Eastern Cape, South Africa | |
| 7 | Loss | 5–1–1 | Xolisa Magusha | TKO | 3 (8), 1:46 | 20 Nov 2016 | Orient Theatre, East London, Eastern Cape, South Africa | |
| 6 | Win | 5–0–1 | Ndikho Magadaza | TKO | 12 (12), 1:39 | 23 Sep 2016 | OR Tambo Hall, Mthatha, South Africa | Won WBF African Minimum Title. |
| 5 | Draw | 4–0–1 | Deejay Kriel | SD | 6 | 24 Apr 2016 | Emperors Palace, Kempton Park, Gauteng, South Africa | |
| 4 | Win | 4–0 | Malibongwe Mashalaba | PTS | 4 | 29 Nov 2015 | Indoor Sports Centre, Mdantsane, South Africa | |
| 3 | Win | 3–0 | Yanga Sigqibo | PTS | 4 | 2 Oct 2015 | Mdantsane Indoor Centre, Mdantsane, South Africa | |
| 2 | Win | 2–0 | Anele Komana | PTS | 4 | 29 Aug 2015 | Chris Nissen Primary School, Knysna, South Africa | |
| 1 | Win | 1–0 | Vuyani Swartbooi | TKO | 4 (4), 2:44 | 27 Jun 2015 | Titi Jonas Multi-Purpose Community Centre, Port Alfred, South Africa | |

== See also ==
- List of IBO world champions
