= Toto Landero =

Filipino boxer (1995–2022)

Personal information
- Nickname: Muscovado
- Nationality: Filipino
- Born: Robert Villarma Landero; 20 October 1995 Pontevedra, Negros Occidental, Philippines
- Died: 4 July 2022 (aged 26) Tabla River, Negros Occidental, Philippines
- Height: 5 ft 3 in (160 cm)
- Weight: Minimumweight; Light-flyweight

Boxing career
- Stance: Orthodox

Boxing record
- Total fights: 21
- Wins: 11
- Win by KO: 2
- Losses: 8
- Draws: 2

Toto Landero (20 October 1995 – 4 July 2022) was a Filipino professional boxer who challenged for the WBA minimumweight title in 2018.

== Professional boxing career ==
Landero has challenged for two minimumweight world titles in 2018; firstly the WBA title in March, where he lost to Knockout CP Freshmart by unanimous decision. Simphiwe Khonco then defeated Landero in July via the same result to retain his IBO title.

== Professional boxing record ==
21 fights	11 wins	8 losses
By knockout	2	1
By decision	9	7
Draws	2	

No.	Result	Record	Opponent	Type	Round, time	Date	Location	Notes
21	Loss	11–8–2	Christian Araneta	UD	10	17 Jun 2022	Parkmall Mandaue City, Mandaue City, Philippines	
20	Loss	11–7–2	Mark Vicelles	UD	10	10 Dec 2021	Poblacion, Dauis, Philippines	
19	Loss	11–6–2	Melvin Jerusalem	UD	12	16 Jul 2021	Tabunoc Sports Complex, Talisay, Philippines	For vacant OPBF minimumweight title
18	Loss	11–5–2	Tibo Monabesa	UD	12	14 Apr 2021	Balai Sarbini Convention Hall, Jakarta, Indonesia	For vacant WBC International light-flyweight title
17	Win	11–4–2	Joel Lino	UD	8	7 Sep 2019	Jurado Hall of the Philippine Marine Corp, Taguig, Philippines	
16	Loss	10–4–2	Melvin Jerusalem	UD	10	10 Nov 2018	Sports Complex, Minglanilla, Philippines	
15	Loss	10–3–2	Simphiwe Khonco	UD	12	22 Jul 2018	OR Tambo Hall, Umtata, South Africa	For IBO minimumweight title
14	Loss	10–2–2	Knockout CP Freshmart	UD	12	6 Mar 2018	Provincial Ground, Chonburi, Thailand	For WBA minimumweight title
13	Win	10–1–2	Powell Balaba	UD	6	6 Oct 2017	Sucat Covered Court, Muntinlupa, Philippines	
12	Win	9–1–2	Vic Saludar	SD	10	10 Jun 2017	Sports and Cultural Complex, Mandaue, Philippines	
11	Loss	8–1–2	Joey Canoy	TKO	6 (10), 2:45	3 Sep 2016	Jurado Hall of the Philippine Marine Corp, Taguig, Philippines	
10	Win	8–0–2	Rolly Sumalpong	MD	12	18 Feb 2016	SM Mall of Asia Music Hall, Pasay, Philippines	
9	Win	7–0–2	Jerome Clavite	UD	8	30 Oct 2015	South Ville 3 NHA, Muntinlupa, Philippines	
8	Win	6–0–2	Philip Luis Cuerdo	SD	8	31 Jul 2015	Cuneta Astrodome, Pasay, Philippines	
7	Draw	5–0–2	Philip Luis Cuerdo	MD	8	14 May 2015	Ynares Multi-Purpose Covered Court, Rodriguez, Philippines	
6	Win	5–0–1	Jiro Saonoy	TKO	1 (4), 2:56	14 Mar 2015	Barangka Ibaba, Mandaluyong, Philippines	
5	Win	4–0–1	Jeven Villacite	MD	6	13 Dec 2014	Hall Quadrangle, Muntinlupa, Philippines	
4	Draw	3–0–1	Rolly Sumalpong	MD	6	15 Jun 2014	Kutawtaw Gym, Balayan, Philippines	
3	Win	3–0	Herrel Llavore	UD	4	27 Mar 2014	Cinema Square Boxing Arena, Makati, Philippines	
2	Win	2–0	Rommel Berwela	MD	4	7 Feb 2014	Town Plaza Gymnasium, Biñan, Philippines	
1	Win	1–0	Mark Macabales	TKO	2 (4), 1:39	28 Dec 2013	Recreational & Convention Center, Binangonan, Philippines	
