= Leroy Estrada =

Panamanian boxer (b. 1994)

Personal information
- Nickname: El Sensacional (The Sensational)
- Born: Omar Leroy Estrada Avila; 16 June 1994 (age 32) La Chorrera, Panama
- Height: 156 cm (5 ft 1 in)
- Weight: Mini-flyweight; Light-flyweight

Boxing career
- Reach: 178 cm (70 in)
- Stance: Orthodox

Boxing record
- Total fights: 21
- Wins: 17
- Win by KO: 7
- Losses: 4

Leroy Estrada (born June 16, 1994) is a Panamanian professional boxer who challenged for the WBC mini-flyweight title in 2018.

== Professional career ==
Estrada made his pro debut on September 23, 2010. Estrada was first ranked by a sanctioning body in August 2013, entering the IBF's rankings as the #15 mini-flyweight contender, with a 9-1 pro record. In May 2017, Estrada faced Saúl Juárez in a WBC title eliminator, with the winner becoming the mandatory challenger to Wanheng Menayothin. Estrada outboxed Juárez and survived a knockdown to win by unanimous decision. Estrada faced Wanheng Menayothin on 2 May 2018. He proved to be no match for the champion, who battered him and dropped him five times before knocking him out with a right uppercut in round 5. With the win, Wanheng tied Floyd Mayweather Jr.'s 50–0 record.

== Professional boxing record ==
21 fights	17 wins	4 losses
By knockout	7	3
By decision	10	1

No.	Result	Record	Opponent	Type	Round, time	Date	Location	Notes
21	Win	17–4	(Panama) Roger Saldana	TKO	7 (8), 1:19	Oct 15, 2022	Chiriqui Mall, David, Panama	
20	Loss	16–4	(Panama) Azael Villar	TKO	6 (8), 0:34	Jul 31, 2019	Fantastic Casino de Albrook Mall, Panama City, Panama	
19	Loss	16–3	(Thailand) Wanheng Menayothin	TKO	5 (12), 2:20	May 2, 2018	City Hall Ground, Nakhon Ratchasima, Thailand	For WBC mini flyweight title
18	Win	16–2	(Mexico) Saúl Juárez	UD	12	May 27, 2017	Figali Convention Center, Panama City, Panama	
17	Win	15–2	(Venezuela) Vicente Mirabal	TKO	5 (8), 2:35	Aug 9, 2016	Fantastic Casino de Albrook Mall, Panama City, Panama	
16	Win	14–2	(Panama) Jose Sanchez	UD	6	Aug 13, 2015	Fantastic Casino de Albrook Mall, Panama City, Panama	
15	Win	13–2	(Panama) Carlos Melo	UD	6	May 28, 2015	Fantastic Casino de Albrook Mall, Panama City, Panama	
14	Loss	12–2	(Panama) Carlos Ortega	UD	12	Aug 23, 2014	Roberto Durán Arena, Panama City, Panama	For vacant WBC Silver mini flyweight title
13	Win	12–1	(Panama) Edwin Diaz	UD	10	Mar 22, 2014	Roberto Durán Arena, Panama City, Panama	Retained WBC Latino mini flyweight title
12	Win	11–1	(Panama) Carlos Melo	UD	8	Nov 27, 2013	Hotel Veneto, Panama City, Panama	Won vacant WBC Latino mini flyweight title
11	Win	10–1	(Panama) Jesus Santos	TKO	3 (8)	Oct 19, 2013	Roberto Durán Arena, Panama City, Panama	
10	Win	9–1	(Panama) Luis Quintana	TKO	5 (8), 2:08	Feb 28, 2013	Hotel Veneto, Panama City, Panama	Won vacant CBPP Panamanian light flyweight title
9	Win	8–1	(Panama) Gilberto Pedroza	UD	8	Nov 22, 2012	Roberto Durán Arena, Panama City, Panama	
8	Loss	7–1	(Panama) Mercedes Concepcion	KO	6 (8), 1:24	Apr 26, 2012	Roberto Durán Arena, Panama City, Panama	
7	Win	7–0	(Panama) Israel Hidrogo	TKO	4 (6), 2:51	Mar 15, 2012	Roberto Durán Arena, Panama City, Panama	
6	Win	6–0	(Panama) Mercedes Concepcion	MD	6	Dec 1, 2011	Fantastic Hotel de Albrook Mall, Panama City, Panama	
5	Win	5–0	(Nicaragua) Pedro Reyes	RTD	3 (4), 3:00	May 27, 2011	Hotel RIU, Panama City, Panama	
4	Win	4–0	(Guatemala) Julio Canastuj	UD	6	Mar 19, 2011	Hotel El Panama, Panama City, Panama	
3	Win	3–0	(Guatemala) Julio Canastuj	UD	4	Dec 18, 2010	Jardin La Union, La Chorrera, Panama	
2	Win	2–0	(Panama) Jose Angel Montilla	KO	3 (4), 2:08	Oct 28, 2010	Hotel Veneto, Panama City, Panama	
1	Win	1–0	(Panama) Davis Reyes	UD	4	Sep 23, 2010	Fantastic Casino, 24 de Diciembre, Panama	
