= Knockout CP Freshmart =

Thai boxer (born 1990)

Knockout CP Freshmart น็อคเอาท์ ซีพีเฟรชมาร์ท
Personal information
- Born: Thammanoon Niyomtrong; 20 September 1990 (age 36) Mueang Surin, Surin, Thailand
- Height: 5 ft 0 in (152 cm)
- Weight: Mini flyweight; Light flyweight

Boxing career
- Reach: 61 in (155 cm)
- Stance: Orthodox

Boxing record
- Total fights: 32
- Wins: 30
- Win by KO: 11
- Losses: 2

Thammanoon Niyomtrong (Thai: ธรรมนูญ นิยมตรง, born 20 September 1990), known by his ring name Knockout CP Freshmart, is a Thai professional boxer and former Muay Thai fighter. As a professional boxer, he won world titles in two weight divisions having held the World Boxing Association (WBA) (Regular and Super version) between 2016 and 2024, and the World Boxing Council (WBC) light-flyweight title from 2025 to 2026.

== Muay Thai career ==
Under the ring name "Newlukrak Pagonponsurin" (นิวลูกรัก ปกรณ์พรสุรินทร์) or "Newlukrak Sor Kattika" (นิวลูกรัก ส.กัตติกา), he won titles at Rajadamnern Stadium and Lumpinee Boxing Stadium in the 105 lbs division. Niyomtrong trains at Excindicongbingbangongym in Bangkok. He's also an amateur boxing Thai national champion.

== Professional boxing career ==
=== Early career ===
Sponsored by Thai convenience store chain CP Freshmart (a network of Charoen Pokphand), he won the vacant WBC Youth World mini-flyweight title in his professional debut on June 22, 2012, defeating Marzon Cabilla by a sixth-round technical decision. He successfully made seven consecutive defenses before vacating the minor title.

=== WBA interim mini-flyweight champion ===
==== Freshmart vs. Buitrago ====
Knockout then defeated Carlos Buitrago by unanimous decision (115–113, 115–113, 115–113) to win the vacant WBA mini-flyweight interim title on October 1, 2014.

==== Freshmart vs. Rachman ====
Knockout's first defense came against 44-year-old former two-time world champion Muhammad Rachman. He won the fight via a wide unanimous decision (119–111, 117–112, 119–109).

==== Freshmart vs. Diaz ====
Knockout scored a knockout for the first time since claiming the interim world title in July 2015, against Alexis Díaz. Knockout dropped Diaz twice before the referee waved off the fight, giving Knockout a technical knockout win. In April 2016, Knockout went on to rematch Buitrago, winning a wider unanimous decision (119–109, 117–111, 117–111) to defend his title.

=== WBA mini-flyweight champion ===
==== Freshmart vs. Rojas ====
The WBA then ordered a match-up between interim champion Knockout CP Freshmart and their full champion Byron Rojas in April 2016. Rojas was previously the WBA (Regular) champion and had defeated WBA (Super) champion Hekkie Budler to win the full title. The fight took place on June 29 in Khon Kaen. The fight was widely considered boring, as Knockout clinched through most of the fight to no warning from the referee. Nevertheless, he won the fight by unanimous decision (115–113, 115–113, 115–113) to become a world champion.

==== Freshmart vs. Ono ====
Knockout was scheduled to make the first defense of his WBA mini-flyweight title against the former OPBF champion Shin Ono on December 14, 2016. Ono was the #14 ranked WBA mini-flyweight contender at the time. Knockout required a few rounds to adjust to the longer southpaw boxing approach of Ono, but began to take the fight over from the fifth round onward. He won the fight by unanimous decision, with scores of 118–109, 117–111, and 118–110.

==== Freshmart vs. Odaira ====
Knockout was scheduled to make his second title defense against the two-time world title challenger Go Odaira on March 1, 2017. Knockout won the fight by a fifth-round knockout, his first stoppage victory in nearly two years. He dropped Odaira with a left uppercut and right straight combination just before the one minute mark, with Odaira being counted out at the 1:07 minute mark. Knockout scored the first knockdown with a right straight in the fourth round.

==== Freshmart vs. Loreto ====
On April 17, 2017, the WBA ordered Knockout to face the mandatory title challenger Rey Loreto, giving the two parties 30 days to negotiate the terms of the bout. Knockout was obligated to make a mandatory title defense by March 28, 2017, and was as such a month overdue. The fight was scheduled for July 15, 2017. Loreto appeared to edge the first four rounds, successfully controlling the range and causing his opponent's eye to begin swelling shut. Knockout began to take over the fight from the mid-rounds onward and won by unanimous decision, with scores of 117–110, 117–110 and 115–113.

==== Freshmart vs. Landero ====
Knockout was scheduled to make the fourth defense of his title against Toto Landero on March 6, 2018, with Knockout coming into the fight as a significant favorite. Knockout controlled the majority of the bout, although Landero was able to momentarily stagger him in the fourth round and opened a cut by his left eye in the fifth round. Knockout won the fight by unanimous decision, with scores of 117–111, 115–113 and 119–110.

==== Freshmart vs. Chaozhong ====
Knockout made the fifth defense of his WBA title against the former WBC mini-flyweight champion Xiong Chaozhong on July 27, 2018. The bout was contested in the Guosen Gymnasium in Qingdao, China, which was the first time that Knockout fought outside of Thailand in his professional boxing career. Knockout won the fight by a wide unanimous decision, with scores of 118–110, 118–110 and 116–112.

==== Freshmart vs. Rojas ====
Knockout was scheduled to fight a rematch with the former WBA mini-flyweight titlist Byron Rojas in his sixth title defense, on November 29, 2018. Knockout beat Rojas for the second time by unanimous decision, with scores of 115–113, 117-111 and 116–112. Both fighters were warned numerous times for hugging, holding, throwing low blows and leading with the head. BoxingScene described the fight as "a totally forgettable fight with both men more interested in fouling than punching".

==== Freshmart vs. Andales ====
Knockout was scheduled to defend his title for the seventh time against ArAr Andales on August 2, 2019. He won the fight by an eight-round technical decision, with scores of 78–74, 77–75 and 79–73, as he was leading on all the judges scorecards. The fight was stopped due to a cut on Freshmart's left eyelid, which was caused by one of the numerous head clashes throughout the bout.

=== WBA Super mini-flyweight champion ===
==== Freshmart vs. Tanaka ====
Knockout faced the former OPBF and Japan mini-flyweight champion Norihito Tanaka in his eight title defense on March 3, 2020. He won the fight by unanimous decision.

==== Freshmart vs. Sithdabnij ====
Knockout was scheduled to make his ninth WBA title defense against fellow countryman Pongsaklek Sithdabnij on October 5, 2021, at the Chang Arena in Buriram, Thailand. Knockout won the fight by a third-round technical knockout. He scored three knockdowns prior to the knockout, one in the second and two in the third round.

==== Freshmart vs. Paradero ====
Knockout was scheduled to make his 10th title defense against Robert Paradero on December 14, 2021. He won the fight by a fifth-round technical knockout.

==== Freshmart vs. Menayothin ====
Knockout was scheduled to make his 11th defense against former WBC mini-flyweight Champion Wanheng Menayothin on July 20, 2022. Knockout won the fight by unanimous decision, with scores of 116–112, 119–109 and 117–111.

=== Unified WBA & WBO mini-flyweight championship ===
==== Freshmart vs. Collazo ====
Freshmart faced Oscar Collazo for the unified WBA, WBO and the inaugural symbolistic The Ring mini-flyweight titles on November 16, 2024, in Riyadh, Saudi Arabia. He lost the bout by stoppage in the seventh round.

=== WBC light flyweight championship ===
==== Freshmart vs. Zarate ====
On December 14, 2025, he won by unanimous decision, 117–111, 116–112, 116–112, against Junior Leandro Zarate from Argentina, claiming the vacant WBC light flyweight championship at The Imperial Queen's Park Hotel in Bangkok, Thailand.

==== Freshmart vs. Iwata ====
Freshmart lost the title immediately in his first defense against Shokichi Iwata, a former WBO champion in the same division, on March 15, 2026, at Yokohama Buntai, Yokohama, Japan. The referee stopped the fight in the eighth round due to a cut above his left eyebrow caused by a clash of heads, and the ringside doctor ruled that he should not continue. When the scores were tallied, he lost by technical decision, 79–73, 79–73, and 78–74.

=== Post world title career ===
==== Freshmart vs. Zeng ====
Freshmart got back to winning ways in his next fight when he defeated Zeng Yujie via unanimous decision to win the vacant WBC Asian light-flyweight title at City Hall Ground in Chonburi, Thailand, on August 5, 2026.

== Titles and accomplishments ==
=== Muay Thai ===
- Lumpinee Stadium
  - 2014 Lumpinee Stadium 105 lbs Champion
- Professional Boxing Association of Thailand (PAT)
  - 2012 Thailand 105 lbs Champion (one defense)

=== Boxing ===
==== Major world titles ====
- WBA (Super) mini-flyweight champion (105 lbs) (Note: Promoted from WBA world champion.)
- WBC light-flyweight champion (108 lbs)

==== Interim world titles ====
- WBA interim mini-flyweight champion (105 lbs)

==== Regional/International titles ====
- WBC Youth mini-flyweight champion (105 lbs)
- WBC Asian light-flyweight champion (108 lbs)

== Professional boxing record ==
32 fights	30 wins	2 losses
By knockout	11	2
By decision	19	0

No.	Result	Record	Opponent	Type	Round, time	Date	Location	Notes
32	Win	30–2	Zeng Yujie	UD	12	5 Aug 2026	City Hall Ground, Chonburi, Thailand	Won vacant WBC Asian light-flyweight title
31	Loss	29–2	Shokichi Iwata	TKO	8 (12), 1:33	15 Mar 2026	Yokohama Buntai, Yokohama, Japan	Lost WBC light-flyweight title Originally a Unanimous TD for Iwata, later changed to a TKO
30	Win	29–1	Junior Leandro Zarate	UD	12	4 Dec 2025	The Imperial Queen's Park Hotel, Bangkok, Thailand	Won vacant WBC light-flyweight title
29	Win	28–1	Saichon Wongwai	TKO	4 (6), 1:15	27 Aug 2025	Rangsit International Stadium, Pathum Thani, Thailand	
28	Win	27–1	Roland Toyogon	UD	10	28 May 2025	Rangsit International Stadium, Pathum Thani, Thailand	Won WBC Asia mini-flyweight title
27	Win	26–1	Natchaphon Wichaita	KO	3 (6), 2:25	30 Apr 2025	Rangsit International Stadium, Pathum Thani, Thailand	
26	Loss	25–1	Oscar Collazo	TKO	7 (12), 1:29	16 Nov 2024	The Venue Riyadh Season, Riyadh, Saudi Arabia	Lost WBA (Super) mini-flyweight title; For WBO and inaugural The Ring mini-flyweight titles
25	Win	25–0	Alex Winwood	MD	12	7 Sep 2024	Arena Joondalup, Joondalup, Australia	Retained WBA (Super) mini-flyweight title
24	Win	24–0	Wanheng Menayothin	UD	12	20 Jul 2022	Provincial Ground, Chonburi, Thailand	Retained WBA (Super) mini-flyweight title
23	Win	23–0	Robert Paradero	TKO	5 (12), 1:28	14 Dec 2021	Saphan Hin, Phuket, Thailand	Retained WBA (Super) mini-flyweight title
22	Win	22–0	Pongsaklek Sithdabnij	TKO	3 (12), 0:49	5 Oct 2021	Chang Arena, Buriram, Thailand	Retained WBA (Super) mini-flyweight title
21	Win	21–0	Norihito Tanaka	UD	12	3 Mar 2020	Municipality Ground, Nakhon Sawan, Thailand	Retained WBA (Super) mini-flyweight title
20	Win	20–0	ArAr Andales	TD	8 (12), 1:33	2 Aug 2019	City Hall Ground, Nakhon Sawan, Thailand	Retained WBA mini-flyweight title; Unanimous TD after Freshmart cut from accidental head clash
19	Win	19–0	Byron Rojas	UD	12	29 Nov 2018	Provincial Ground, Chonburi, Thailand	Retained WBA mini-flyweight title
18	Win	18–0	Xiong Chaozhong	UD	12	27 Jul 2018	Guosen Gymnasium, Qingdao, China	Retained WBA mini-flyweight title
17	Win	17–0	Toto Landero	UD	12	6 Mar 2018	Provincial Ground, Chonburi, Thailand	Retained WBA mini-flyweight title
16	Win	16–0	Rey Loreto	UD	12	15 Jul 2017	City Hall Ground, Chonburi, Thailand	Retained WBA mini-flyweight title
15	Win	15–0	Go Odaira	TKO	5 (12), 1:07	1 Mar 2017	City Hall Ground, Chonburi, Thailand	Retained WBA mini-flyweight title
14	Win	14–0	Shin Ono	UD	12	14 Dec 2016	Provincial Ground, Nakhon Ratchasima, Thailand	Retained WBA mini-flyweight title
13	Win	13–0	Byron Rojas	UD	12	29 Jun 2016	City Hall Ground, Khon Kaen, Thailand	Won WBA mini-flyweight title
12	Win	12–0	Carlos Buitrago	UD	12	4 Feb 2016	City Hall Ground, Chonburi, Thailand	Retained WBA interim mini-flyweight title
11	Win	11–0	Alexis Díaz	TKO	4 (12), 2:45	2 Jul 2015	City Hall Ground, Nakhon Ratchasima, Thailand	Retained WBA interim mini-flyweight title
10	Win	10–0	Muhammad Rachman	UD	12	5 Mar 2015	City Hall Ground, Chonburi, Thailand	Retained WBA interim mini-flyweight title
9	Win	9–0	Carlos Buitrago	UD	12	1 Oct 2014	New I-Mobile Stadium, Buriram, Thailand	Won vacant WBA interim mini-flyweight title
8	Win	8–0	Cris Alfante	TKO	5 (10)	25 Jul 2014	Provincial Gymnasium, Chonburi, Thailand	Retained WBC Youth mini-flyweight title
7	Win	7–0	Sandeep	KO	5 (10)	10 Jun 2014	Siam Paradise Entertainment Centre, Bangkok, Thailand	Retained WBC Youth mini-flyweight title
6	Win	6–0	Jonathan Refugio	UD	10	28 Mar 2014	Chokchai 4 Market, Bangkok, Thailand	Retained WBC Youth mini-flyweight title
5	Win	5–0	Amit Panghal	UD	10	31 Jan 2014	Nongplalai School, Ubon Ratchathani, Thailand	Retained WBC Youth mini-flyweight title
4	Win	4–0	Bimbo Nacionales	TKO	5 (10), 2:08	10 Jul 2013	Siam Paradise Entertainment Centre, Bangkok, Thailand	Retained WBC Youth mini-flyweight title
3	Win	3–0	Mark Anthony Florida	TKO	5 (10), 2:16	26 Apr 2013	Provincial Ground, Khon Kaen, Thailand	Retained WBC Youth mini-flyweight title
2	Win	2–0	Demsi Manufoe	KO	3 (10)	3 Dec 2012	11th Inf Reg, Bangkok, Thailand	Retained WBC Youth mini-flyweight title
1	Win	1–0	Marzon Cabilla	TD	6 (10)	22 Jun 2012	Bueng Kum District, Bangkok, Thailand	Won vacant WBC Youth World mini-flyweight title

== Muay Thai record ==
Muay Thai record
Date	Result	Opponent	Event	Location	Method	Round	Time
2014-05-06	Win	(Thailand) Ploysiam PetchyindeeAcademy	Suek Petchpiya, Lumpinee Stadium	Bangkok, Thailand	TKO (Left Knee)	4	
2014-02-28	Win	(Thailand) Tuktatong Por.Thairungruang	Suek Lumpinee Champion Krekkai	Bangkok, Thailand	Decision (Unanimous)	5	3:00
Wins the vacant Lumpinee Stadium 105 lbs Title.
2013-11-01	Win	(Thailand) Rungnarai Kiatmuu9	Petchyindee, Lumpinee Stadium	Bangkok, Thailand	KO (Right Hook)	3	
2013-10-10	Loss	(Thailand) Tuktatong Por.Thairungruang	Petchwiset, Rajadamnern Stadium	Bangkok, Thailand	Decision	5	3:00
2013-09-03	Loss	(Thailand) Tuktatong Por.Thairungruang	Fairtex, Lumpinee Stadium	Bangkok, Thailand	Decision	5	3:00
2013-08-09	Loss	(Thailand) Chopper Kor Sapaotong	Petchyindee, Lumpinee Stadium	Bangkok, Thailand	Decision	5	3:00
2013-06-07	Loss	(Thailand) Satanmuanglek Windysport	Lumpinee Champion Krekkai, Lumpinee Stadium	Bangkok, Thailand	Decision	5	3:00
For the vacant Lumpinee Stadium 105 lbs Title.
2013-04-13	Win	(Thailand) Petang Kiatphontip	Rajadamnern Stadium	Bangkok, Thailand	KO (Left Hook)	2	
2013-02-08	Loss	(Thailand) Satanmuanglek CP Freshmart	Lumpinee Stadium	Bangkok, Thailand	KO (Left low kick)	3	
Lost the Thailand 105 lbs Title.
2013-01-04	Win	(Thailand) Ploysiam PetchyindeeAcademy	Lumpinee Stadium	Bangkok, Thailand	Decision	5	3:00
Defended Thailand 105 lbs Title.
2012-10-04	Win	(Thailand) Wanchai Ramboisan	Rajadamnern Stadium	Bangkok, Thailand	Decision	5	3:00
2012-09-04	Win	(Thailand) Ploiwittaya Rotsurat	Lumpinee Stadium	Bangkok, Thailand	KO (Left Hook)	4	
Wins the Thailand 105 lbs Title.
Legend: Win Loss Draw/No contest Notes

== See also ==
- List of male boxers
- List of world mini-flyweight boxing champions
- List of world light-flyweight boxing champions

== Notes ==
Sporting positions
Regional boxing titles
Vacant Title last held by Veerawut Yuthimitr	WBC Youth mini-flyweight champion 22 June 2012 – 1 October 2014; Won WBA interim title	Vacant Title next held by Chanachai CP Freshmart
Vacant Title last held by Yujie Zeng	WBC Asian mini-flyweight champion 28 May 2025 – 4 December 2025; Won world title	Vacant
World boxing titles
Vacant Title last held by Hekkie Budler	WBA mini-flyweight champion Interim title 1 October 2014 – 29 June 2016; Won full title	Vacant Title next held by Erick Rosa
Preceded by Byron Rojas	WBA mini-flyweight champion 29 June 2016 – 1 March 2020; Promoted	Vacant Title next held by Vic Saludar
New title	WBA mini-flyweight champion Super title 1 March 2020 – 16 November 2024	Succeeded by Oscar Collazo
Vacant Title last held by Carlos Cañizales	WBC light-flyweight champion 4 December 2025 – 15 March 2026	Succeeded by Shokichi Iwata
