= Simphiwe Khonco =

South African boxer

Personal information
- Nickname: Chain Reaction
- Nationality: South African
- Born: 9 April 1984 (age 42) Mthatha, Eastern Cape, South Africa
- Height: 5 ft 2 in (157 cm)
- Weight: Mini-flyweight

Boxing career
- Reach: 64 1/2 in (164 cm)
- Stance: Orthodox

Boxing record
- Total fights: 28
- Wins: 20
- Win by KO: 7
- Losses: 7
- No contests: 1

Simphiwe Khonco is a South African professional boxer. He held the IBO mini-flyweight title from 2016 to 2019 and challenged for the WBA mini-flyweight title in 2015 and the WBC mini-flyweight title in 2019.

== Boxing career ==
=== IBO mini-flyweight champion ===
Khonco was scheduled to fight Siyabonga Siyo for the vacant IBO mini-flyweight title on June 11, 2016 at the Emperors Palace in Kempton Park, Gauteng. The fight was a hometown bout for both competitors, as they both hailed from the Eastern Cape province of South African Republic. Khonco won the fight by unanimous decision, with two of the judges scoring the fight 118-110 in his favor, while the third judge scored the fight 116-112 for him.

Khonco made his first title defense against Nkosinathi Joyi on November 20, 2016. It was the first time that a world title fight was held in Mthatha, South Africa. Khonco won the fight by unanimous decision, with scores of 119-111, 119-111 and 118-112.

Khonco was scheduled to make his second IBO title defense against Lito Dante on June 10, 2017 at the Emperors Palace in Kempton Park, Gauteng. He won the fight by unanimous decision, with scores of 119-109, 119-109 and 118-110.

Khonco was scheduled to make his third title defense against Joey Canoy on December 2, 2018. The fight ended abruptly in the fourth round, after an accidental clash of heads left Khonco unable to continue. The fight was accordingly declared a no contest. Khonco subsequently refused a rematch, stating “We took this fight on our own but now we are moving foward [sic]".

=== Later mini-flyweight career ===
Khonco was scheduled to challenge the reigning WBC mini-flyweight title champion Wanheng Menayothin on October 25, 2019. Wanheng won the fight by unanimous decision, with scores of 118-109, 116-110, and 117-109.

Khonco faced Ariston Aton (9–3) on April 9, 2022, at the Superbowl in Sun City, on the undercard of the Athenkosi Dumezweni and Landi Ngxeke South African super flyweight title bout. He won the fight by unanimous decision, with scores of 100–90, 96–92 and 97–93.

== Professional boxing record ==
28 fights	20 wins	7 losses
By knockout	8	4
By decision	12	3
No contests	1	

No.	Result	Record	Opponent	Type	Round, time	Date	Location	Notes
28	Loss	20–7 (1)	Garen Diagan	TKO	7 (10)	1 Oct 2022	Time Square, Pretoria, South Africa	
27	Win	20–6 (1)	Ariston Aton	UD	10	9 Apr 2022	Superbowl, Sun City, South Africa	
26	Loss	19–6 (1)	Wanheng Menayothin	UD	12	25 Oct 2019	City Hall Ground, Chonburi, Thailand	For WBC mini-flyweight title
25	NC	19–5 (1)	Joey Canoy	NC	4 (12)	2 Dec 2018	Orient theatre, East London, South Africa	Retained IBO mini-flyweight title; Fight stopped after Khonco was cut from an accidental head clash
24	Win	19–5	Toto Landero	UD	12	22 Jul 2018	Umtata, Eastern Cape, South Africa	Retained IBO mini-flyweight title
23	Win	18–5	Lito Dante	UD	12	10 Jun 2017	Emperors Palace, Kempton Park, South Africa	Retained IBO mini-flyweight title
22	Win	17–5	Nkosinathi Joyi	UD	12	20 Nov 2016	Orient Theatre, East London, South Africa	Retained IBO mini-flyweight title
21	Win	16–5	Siyabonga Siyo	UD	12	11 Jun 2016	Emperors Palace, Kempton Park, South Africa	Won vacant IBO mini-flyweight title
20	Loss	15–5	Hekkie Budler	UD	12	19 Sep 2015	Emperors Palace, Kempton Park, South Africa	For WBA and IBO mini-flyweight titles
19	Win	15–4	Nhlanhla Ngamntwini	KO	4 (12)	15 Dec 2014	Orient Theatre, East London, South Africa	Won vacant IBO Inter-Continental mini-flyweight title
18	Win	14–4	Sibusiso Twani	SD	12	26 Apr 2014	Tsolo Junction Hall, Qumbu, South Africa	Retained WBA Pan-African and South African mini-flyweight titles
17	Win	13–4	Luyanda Nkwankwa	PTS	12	28 Jul 2013	Tsolo Junction Hall, Mthatha, South Africa	Retained South African mini-flyweight title
16	Win	12–4	Khanyakude Mukansi	PTS	12	14 Apr 2013	OR Tambo Hall, Mthatha, South Africa	Won vacant WBA Pan African mini-flyweight title
15	Win	11–4	Zukisani Kwayiba	KO	9 (12)	1 Dec 2012	OR Tambo Hall, Mthatha, South Africa	Retained South African mini-flyweight title
14	Win	10–4	Lutho Nkonki	TKO	3 (12)	23 Sep 2012	OR Tambo Hall, Mthatha, South Africa	Retained South African mini-flyweight title
13	Win	9–4	Bongani Mfundisi	TKO	7 (12), 1:28	2 Jun 2012	Orient Theatre, East London, South Africa	Won vacant South African mini-flyweight title
12	Win	8–4	Luyanda Nkwankwa	PTS	6	27 Aug 2011	Dutywa, South Africa	
11	Win	7–4	Loyiso Dayimani	PTS	6	14 Nov 2010	Mdantsane Indoor Centre, East London, South Africa	
10	Loss	6–4	Luzuko Siyo	TKO	4 (6)	25 Apr 2010	Orient Theatre, East London, South Africa	
9	Loss	6–3	Siviwe Ntsiko	TKO	3 (6)	18 Dec 2009	Orient Theatre, East London, South Africa	
8	Win	6–2	Siviwe Jonas	PTS	6	24 Oct 2009	Community Hall, Komga, South Africa	
7	Win	5–2	Loyiso Dayimani	TKO	2 (?)	8 Mar 2009	Walter Sisulu University, Butterworth, South Africa	
6	Loss	4–2	Lwazi Nduneni	KO	4 (8)	16 Aug 2008	OR Tambo Hall, Mthatha, South Africa	
5	Win	4–1	Siyabonga Jolibokwe	TKO	1 (6)	19 Jul 2008	OR Tambo Hall, Mthatha, South Africa	
4	Win	3–1	Lulama Ntshikivana	TKO	3 (4)	21 Jun 2008	OR Tambo Hall, Mthatha, South Africa	
3	Loss	2–1	Nelson Mtshali	PTS	4	24 Nov 2007	Mdantsane Indoor Centre, East London, South Africa	
2	Win	2–0	Loyiso Dayimani	PTS	4	26 Oct 2007	OR Tambo Hall, Mthatha, South Africa	
1	Win	1–0	Sibusiso Ngqalathi	PTS	4	15 Sep 2007	Mmabatho, South Africa	
