= Wanheng Menayothin =

Thai boxer

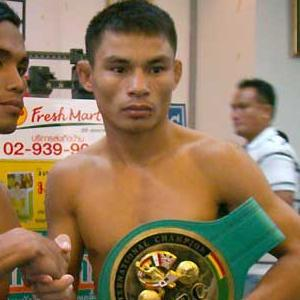

Personal information
- Nicknames: Yak Khrae Mueang Thai (ยักษ์แคระเมืองไทย) "Thailand Dwarf Giant"
- Born: Chayaphol Moonsri; 27 October 1985 (age 41) Amphoe Borabue, Maha Sarakham Province, Thailand
- Height: 5 ft 2 in (157 cm)
- Weight: Mini-flyweight

Boxing career
- Reach: 64 1/2 in (164 cm)
- Stance: Orthodox

Boxing record
- Total fights: 59
- Wins: 55
- Win by KO: 19
- Losses: 3
- No contests: 1

Chayaphon Moonsri (Thai: ชยพล มูลศรี; formerly: Saengsuree Moonsri; แสงสุรีย์ มูลศรี; born 27 October 1985), known as Wanheng Menayothin (วันเฮง มีนะโยธิน) or Wanheng Kaiyanghadaogym is a Thai professional boxer and Muay Thai fighter who held the WBC mini-flyweight title from 2014 to 2020.

== Early life and Muay Thai career ==
Moonsri graduated with a Bachelor of Arts from Bangkokthonburi University. Prior to becoming a professional boxer, Menayothin was a Muay Thai fighter. Kaiyanghadaogym took up Muay Thai at 13 and he sustained his family with the money he earned from fighting. He went on to become a Lumpinee champion and a Thai national champion.

== Boxing career ==
Wanheng made his professional debut in January 2007. He won the WBC Youth mini-flyweight title in his third fight. He later claimed two more secondary titles, with the WBC International Silver title and the WBC International title. In June 2011, Wanheng outpointed former world champion Florante Condes. On 31 May 2013, Moonsri defeated Raul Pusta Jr. by ninth-round technical knockout to retain the WBC International mini-flyweight title.

On 6 November 2014, Wanheng won his first world title when he defeated defending champion Oswaldo Novoa to win the WBC mini-flyweight title. Novoa was badly hurt by an overhand punch in the ninth round and he retired in the corner. Wanheng's promoter, Virat Vachirarattanawong, paid $175,000 to host the fight, a rarely high purse for the weight class. In his sixth defense, Wanheng beat Melvin Jerusalem via unanimous decision (115–113, 114–113, 114–113). Two scorecards were swung by a point deduction Jerusalem received after he threw a low blow.

=== Undefeated World record ===
On 2 May 2018, Wanheng equalled Floyd Mayweather Jr.'s 50–0 record by knocking out Panamanian opponent Leroy Estrada in the fifth round in a mandatory title defense.

On 29 August 2018, Wanheng eclipsed Mayweather, reaching 51–0 with a points win over Pedro Taduran.

On 31 May 2019, Menayothin fought Tatsuya Fukuhara. Despite suffering a cut, Menayothin managed to outbox his opponent. In the eighth round, the cut was deemed too severe by the referee, who stopped the fight early, and went to the scorecards. Menayothin was leading on all three scorecards at the time, 79-73, 78-74 and 78-74, and was awarded the technical decision victory and retained his WBC mini-flyweight belt.

In his next fight, Menayothin defended his title against Simphiwe Khonco. The WBC champion won via unanimous decision.

=== First loss ===
On 27 November 2020, he faced the WBC's number three ranked contender, Panya Pradabsri, at the City Hall Ground in Nakhon Sawan, Thailand. After a closely contested fight Menayothin suffered the first defeat of his career, losing his WBC title via twelve-round unanimous decision. All three judges scored the bout 115–113 in favour of Pradabsri.

Wanheng faced Knockout CP Freshmart for WBA (Super) mini-flyweight title on July 20, 2022. He lost the fight by unanimous decision, with scores of 116-112, 119-109 and 117-111.

== Titles and accomplishments ==
=== Muay Thai ===
- Lumpinee Stadium
  - 2006 Lumpinee Stadium Mini Flyweight (105 lbs) Champion
    - Two successful title defenses
- Toyota Marathon
  - 2010 Toyota Marathon Tournament 108 lbs Winner

== Professional boxing record ==
59 fights	55 wins	3 losses
By knockout	19	0
By decision	36	3
No contests	1	

No.	Result	Record	Opponent	Type	Round, time	Date	Location	Notes
59	Loss	55–3 (1)	Knockout CP Freshmart	UD	12	20 Jul 2022	City Hall Ground, Chonburi, Thailand	For WBA (Super) mini-flyweight title
58	NC	55–2 (1)	Jinnawat Rienpit	KO	4 (6), 1:49	24 May 2022	Rangsit Stadium, Rangsit, Thailand	Originally a KO win for Wanheng, later overturned after it was revealed that Jinnawat was still serving out a 30-day suspension at the time
57	Loss	55–2	Panya Pradabsri	UD	12	29 Mar 2022	City Hall Ground, Nakhon Sawan, Thailand	For WBC mini-flyweight title
56	Win	55–1	Jinnawat Rienpit	KO	3 (6), 0:45	2 Nov 2021	City Hall Ground, Nakhon Sawan, Thailand	
55	Loss	54–1	Panya Pradabsri	UD	12	27 Nov 2020	City Hall Ground, Nakhon Sawan, Thailand	Lost WBC mini-flyweight title
54	Win	54–0	Simphiwe Khonco	UD	12	25 Oct 2019	City Hall Ground, Chonburi, Thailand	Retained WBC mini-flyweight title
53	Win	53–0	Tatsuya Fukuhara	TD	8 (12), 1:32	31 May 2019	City Hall, Chachoengsao, Thailand	Retained WBC mini-flyweight title; Unanimous TD after Menayothin cut from accidental head clash
52	Win	52–0	Mektison Marganti	UD	6	16 Nov 2018	Sofia Hotel, Prachinburi, Thailand	
51	Win	51–0	Pedro Taduran	UD	12	29 Aug 2018	Nakhon Sawan, Thailand	Retained WBC mini-flyweight title
50	Win	50–0	Leroy Estrada	TKO	5 (12), 2:20	2 May 2018	City Hall Ground, Nakhon Ratchasima, Thailand	Retained WBC mini-flyweight title
49	Win	49–0	Tatsuya Fukuhara	UD	12	25 Nov 2017	Suranari Central Stadium, Nakhon Ratsachima, Thailand	Retained WBC mini-flyweight title
48	Win	48–0	Jack Amisa	UD	6	25 Aug 2017	City Hall Ground, Chonburi, Thailand	
47	Win	47–0	Omari Kimweri	UD	12	3 Jun 2017	Provincial Stadium, Rayong, Thailand	Retained WBC mini-flyweight title
46	Win	46–0	Jeysever Abcede	UD	6	31 Mar 2017	Bangmod Wittaya School, Chom Thong, Thailand	
45	Win	45–0	Melvin Jerusalem	UD	12	25 Jan 2017	Institute of Physical Education Stadium, Sukhothai, Thailand	Retained WBC mini-flyweight title
44	Win	44–0	Silem Serang	PTS	6	14 Dec 2016	Nakhon Ratchasima, Thailand	
43	Win	43–0	Saúl Juárez	UD	12	2 Aug 2016	City Hall Ground, Chonburi, Thailand	Retained WBC mini-flyweight title
42	Win	42–0	Edo Anggoro	KO	4 (8)	27 May 2016	Night Bazzar, Ayutthaya, Thailand	
41	Win	41–0	Go Odaira	TKO	5 (12), 2:00	3 Mar 2016	City Hall Ground, Nakhon Ratchasima, Thailand	Retained WBC mini-flyweight title
40	Win	40–0	Young Gil Bae	TKO	9 (12), 2:15	24 Nov 2015	City Hall Ground, Chonburi, Thailand	Retained WBC mini-flyweight title
39	Win	39–0	Ardi Buyung	TKO	4 (6)	8 Oct 2015	Siam Paradise Entertainment Centre, Bangkok, Thailand	
38	Win	38–0	Jerry Tomogdan	KO	9 (12), 1:04	2 Jun 2015	11th Inf Reg, Bangkok, Thailand	Retained WBC mini-flyweight title
37	Win	37–0	Jeffrey Galero	UD	12	5 Feb 2015	City Hall Ground, Nakhon Sawan, Thailand	Retained WBC mini-flyweight title
36	Win	36–0	Oswaldo Novoa	RTD	9 (12), 3:00	6 Nov 2014	City Hall Ground, Chonburi, Thailand	Won WBC mini-flyweight title
35	Win	35–0	Samuel Tehuayo	UD	6	27 Jun 2014	Night Bazzar, Ayutthaya, Thailand	
34	Win	34–0	Domi Nenokeba	TKO	4 (6)	25 Apr 2014	Central Stadium, Phitsanulok, Thailand	
33	Win	33–0	Heri Amol	UD	6	28 Mar 2014	Chokchai 4 Market, Bangkok, Thailand	
32	Win	32–0	Madit Sada	UD	6	27 Dec 2013	Siam Paradise Entertainment Centre, Bangkok, Thailand	
31	Win	31–0	Jack Amisa	UD	10	31 Oct 2013	Hat Yai, Thailand	
30	Win	30–0	Yuma Iwahashi	UD	12	30 Aug 2013	City Hall Ground, Chonburi, Thailand	Retained WBC International mini-flyweight title
29	Win	29–0	Domi Nenokeba	TKO	2 (6)	24 Jul 2013	Central Stadium, Phitsanulok, Thailand	
28	Win	28–0	Raul Pusta, Jr.	TKO	9 (12), 1:14	31 May 2013	Toyota Office, Kanchanaburi, Thailand	Retained WBC International mini-flyweight title
27	Win	27–0	Samuel Tehuayo	UD	6	29 Mar 2013	Thungsimuang, Udon Thani, Thailand	
26	Win	26–0	Jack Amisa	UD	6	25 Jan 2013	Wat Bannamtieng, Maha Sarakham, Thailand	
25	Win	25–0	Roilo Golez	UD	12	3 Dec 2012	11th Inf Reg, Bangkok, Thailand	Retained WBC International mini-flyweight title
24	Win	24–0	Jerson Luzarito	TKO	8 (12), 1:40	28 Sep 2012	Kad Choengdoi, Chiang Mai, Thailand	Retained WBC International mini-flyweight title
23	Win	23–0	Safwan Lombok	UD	6	22 Jun 2012	Bungkum, Bangkok, Thailand	
22	Win	22–0	Boy Tanto	TKO	2	27 Apr 2012	Nakhon Pathom, Thailand	
21	Win	21–0	Jonathan Refugio	TKO	9 (12), 2:40	24 Feb 2012	Siam Cociety Hotel and Resort, Bangkok, Thailand	Retained WBC International mini-flyweight title
20	Win	20–0	Albert Alcoy	UD	6	23 Dec 2011	11th Inf Reg, Bangkok, Thailand	
19	Win	19–0	Crison Omayao	UD	12	11 Nov 2011	Thabo, Nong Khai, Thailand	Won vacant WBC International mini-flyweight title
18	Win	18–0	Jetly Purisima	KO	11 (12), 0:47	20 Sep 2011	Municipal Stadium, Kanchanaburi, Thailand	Retained WBC Silver International mini-flyweight title
17	Win	17–0	Florante Condes	UD	12	24 Jun 2011	Chokchai 4 Market, Bangkok, Thailand	Retained WBC Silver International mini-flyweight title
16	Win	16–0	Noli Morales	TD	6 (12), 2:12	31 Mar 2011	Sara Buri, Thailand	Retained WBC Silver International mini-flyweight title
15	Win	15–0	Remy Cuambot	TD	10 (12), 1:57	6 Jan 2011	Central Stadium, Nakhon Phanom, Thailand	Won vacant WBC Silver International mini-flyweight title
14	Win	14–0	Jayson Rotoni	UD	12	6 Aug 2010	Light Infantry Boxing Arena, Bangkok, Thailand	Retained WBC interim International mini-flyweight title
13	Win	13–0	Ronelle Ferreras	UD	12	30 Apr 2010	Ayutthaya Park, Ayutthaya, Thailand	Retained WBC interim International mini-flyweight title
12	Win	12–0	Jayson Rotoni	UD	12	24 Dec 2009	11th Inf Reg, Bangkok, Thailand	Won WBC interim International mini-flyweight title
11	Win	11–0	Justin Golden Boy	KO	3 (10), 2:21	2 Oct 2009	Provincial School, Nakhon Phanom, Thailand	Retained WBC Youth World mini-flyweight title
10	Win	10–0	Ruel Lagunero	UD	10	26 Jun 2009	City Hall Ground, Nakhon Ratchasima, Thailand	Retained WBC Youth World mini-flyweight title
9	Win	9–0	Adi Nukung	UD	10	25 Feb 2009	Ayutthaya Park, Ayutthaya, Thailand	Retained WBC Youth World mini-flyweight title
8	Win	8–0	Ardin Diale	UD	10	31 Oct 2008	Chokchai Four, Bangkok, Thailand	Retained WBC Youth World mini-flyweight title
7	Win	7–0	Kuk Chok Jo	TKO	6 (10)	29 Aug 2008	Railway Station Boxing Arena, Sara Buri, Thailand	Retained WBC Youth World mini-flyweight title
6	Win	6–0	Sofyan Effendi	UD	10	25 Apr 2008	Bangkok, Thailand	Retained WBC Youth World mini-flyweight title
5	Win	5–0	Armando dela Cruz	KO	5 (10)	24 Oct 2007	Wat Yai Klang, Bang Phli, Thailand	Retained WBC Youth World mini-flyweight title
4	Win	4–0	Dennis Juntillano	UD	10	31 Jul 2007	District Office, Chom Thong, Thailand	Retained WBC Youth World mini-flyweight title
3	Win	3–0	Ma Yiming	TKO	1 (10), 2:21	30 Mar 2007	Mathayom Wat Sing School, Samut Prakan, Thailand	Won vacant WBC Youth World mini-flyweight title
2	Win	2–0	Danny Linasa	UD	8	23 Feb 2007	Chokchai 4 Center, Bangkok, Thailand	
1	Win	1–0	Roel Gade	UD	6	26 Jan 2007	City Hall, Tak, Thailand	

== Muay Thai record ==
Muay Thai record
55 Wins, 23 Losses, 2 Draws
Date	Result	Opponent	Event	Location	Method	Round	Time
2011-05-10	Loss	(Thailand) Phetmorakot Petchyindee Academy	Lumpinee Stadium	Bangkok, Thailand	Decision	5	3:00
2010-11-02	Win	(Thailand) Khunsuek P.N.Gym	Lumpinee Stadium	Bangkok, Thailand	Decision	5	3:00
2010-08-25	Win	(Thailand) Petchsurat Sor.Yupinda	Toyota Marathon Tournament, Final	Thailand	Decision	3	3:00
Wins the 2010 Toyota Marathon Tournament 108 lbs title.
2010-08-25	Win	(Thailand) Jingreedthong ToyotaKeMotor	Toyota Marathon Tournament, Semifinals	Thailand	Decision	3	3:00
2010-08-25	Win	(Thailand) Pornsawan Porpramook	Toyota Marathon Tournament, Quarterfinals	Thailand	Decision	3	3:00
2010-07-13	Win	(Thailand) Chaidet Sor.Sor.Suriya	Lumpinee Stadium	Bangkok, Thailand	TKO	2	
2010-03-05	Loss	(Thailand) Khunsuek P.N.Gym		Bangkok, Thailand	Decision	5	3:00
For the Thailand 108 lbs title.
2009-09-11	Win	(Thailand) Farungruang Sor.Punsawat	Lumpinee Stadium	Bangkok, Thailand	Decision	5	3:00
2009-05-01	Loss	(Thailand) Phetmorakot Teeded99	Lumpinee Stadium	Bangkok, Thailand	Decision	5	3:00
2008-12-08	Win	(Thailand) Jomhod Eminentair	Lumpinee Stadium	Bangkok, Thailand	Decision	5	3:00
2008-06-27	Win	(Thailand) Sriphatthanalek SukkasemResort	Wanboonya, Lumpinee Stadium	Bangkok, Thailand	Decision	5	3:00
2008-02-27	Win	(Thailand) Sriphatthanalek SukkasemResort	Kiatsingnoi, Rajadamnern Stadium	Bangkok, Thailand	Decision	5	3:00
2008-01-02	Win	(Thailand) Nongnan Kiatprathum	Daorungprabat, Rajadamnern Stadium	Bangkok, Thailand	Decision	5	3:00
2007-12-07	Loss	(Thailand) Nongnan Kiatprahtum	Lumpini Champion krikkrai, Lumpinee Stadium	Bangkok, Thailand	Decision	5	3:00
For the vacant Lumpinee Stadium Mini Flyweight (105 lbs) title
2007-08-31	Win	(Thailand) Khom Sor.Ploenchit	Petchyindee, Lumpinee Stadium	Bangkok, Thailand	Decision	5	3:00
2007-05-01	Win	(Thailand) Sripatthanalek Sor.Ploenchit	Lumpinee Stadium	Bangkok, Thailand	KO	4	
2006-11-15	Win	(Thailand) Palangpon Piriyanoppachai	Meenayothin, Rajadamnern Stadium	Bangkok, Thailand	Decision	5	3:00
2006-09-22	Win	(Thailand) Jomhod Eminentair	Lumpinee Stadium	Bangkok, Thailand	Decision	5	3:00
Defends the Lumpinee Stadium Mini Flyweight (105 lbs) title
2006-08-29	Loss	(Thailand) Norasing Lukbanyai	Lumpinee Stadium	Bangkok, Thailand	Decision	5	3:00
2006-08-04	Win	(Thailand) Nampetch Sor.Thantip	Petchyindee, Lumpinee Stadium	Bangkok, Thailand	Decision	5	3:00
Defends the Lumpinee Stadium Mini Flyweight (105 lbs) title
2006-06-02	Win	(Thailand) Khunponjew Siangsawanpanpa	Lumpinee Stadium	Bangkok, Thailand	KO (Punches)	1	
Wins the vacant Lumpinee Stadium Mini Flyweight (105 lbs) title.
2006-05-17	Win	(Thailand) Petchboonchu Borplaboonchu	Meenayothin, Rajadamnern Stadium	Bangkok, Thailand	TKO (Referee stoppage)	3	
2006-02-22	Loss	(Thailand) Nampetch Sor.Thantip	Meenayothin, Rajadamnern Stadium	Bangkok, Thailand	Decision	5	3:00
2005-12-22	Win	(Thailand) Khaimookdam Pomkhwannarong	Rajadamnern Stadium	Bangkok, Thailand	Decision	5	3:00
2005-09-26	Loss	(Thailand) Palangpon Piriyanoppachai	Onesongchai, Rajadamnern Stadium	Bangkok, Thailand	Decision	5	3:00
2005-08-08	Draw	(Thailand) Khaimookdam Pomkhwannarong	Onesongchai, Rajadamnern Stadium	Bangkok, Thailand	Decision	5	3:00
2005-06-09	Win	(Thailand) Teelek Por.Telakun	Onesongchai, Rajadamnern Stadium	Bangkok, Thailand	Decision	5	3:00
2005-05-19	Win	(Thailand) Yokpetch Sor.Ploenchit	Onesongchai, Rajadamnern Stadium	Bangkok, Thailand	Decision	5	3:00
2005-02-17	Win	(Thailand) Rachasee Sor.Jaipetch	Onesongchai, Rajadamnern Stadium	Bangkok, Thailand	KO	2	
2004-12-06	Win	(Thailand) Aidu 13RienExpress	Onesongchai, Rajadamnern Stadium	Bangkok, Thailand	Decision	5	3:00
2004-10-11	Draw	(Thailand) Linglom Kiatthaworn	Phettongkawan, Rajadamnern Stadium	Bangkok, Thailand	Decision	5	3:00
2004-07-19	Loss	(Thailand) Palangpon Piriyanoppachai	Onesongchai, Rajadamnern Stadium	Bangkok, Thailand	Decision	5	3:00
2004-05-20	Win	(Thailand) Nuengthep EminentAir	Kiatsingnoi, Rajadamnern Stadium	Bangkok, Thailand	KO	4	
2004-04-05	Draw	(Thailand) Farungruang Sor.Poonsawat	Onesongchai, Rajadamnern Stadium	Bangkok, Thailand	Decision	5	3:00
2004-02-18	Loss	(Thailand) Weraburuthai Saksomshy	Rajadamnern Stadium	Bangkok, Thailand	TKO	5	3:00
2003-11-27	Win	(Thailand) Farungruang Sor.Poonsawat	Onesongchai, Rajadamnern Stadium	Bangkok, Thailand	Decision	5	3:00
2003-10-30	Loss	(Thailand) Luknimit Singklongsi	Rajadamnern Stadium	Bangkok, Thailand	Decision	5	3:00
2003-08-31	Loss	(Thailand) Farungruang Sor.Poolsawat	Onesongchai, Rajadamnern Stadium	Bangkok, Thailand	Decision	5	3:00
2003-03-14	Loss	(Thailand) Lakhai Por.Panachuaphet	Rajadamnern Stadium	Bangkok, Thailand	Decision	5	3:00
Legend: Win Loss Draw/No contest Notes

Sporting positions
Regional boxing titles
Vacant Title last held by Kittipong Jaikajang	WBC Youth World mini-flyweight champion 30 March 2007 – 24 December 2009; Won interim International title	Vacant Title next held by Veerawut Yuthimitr
New title	WBC International mini-flyweight champion Interim title 24 December 2009 – 6 January 2011; Won International Silver title	Title discontinued
New title	WBC International Silver mini-flyweight champion 6 January 2011 – 11 November 2011; Won International title	Vacant Title next held by Javier Martínez Resendiz
Vacant Title last held by Denver Cuello	WBC International mini-flyweight champion 11 November 2011 – 6 November 2014; Won world title	Vacant Title next held by Xiong Chaozhong
World boxing titles
Preceded by Oswaldo Novoa	WBC mini-flyweight champion 6 November 2014 – 27 November 2020	Succeeded by Panya Pradabsri
