= Simphiwe Yiba =

South African cricketer (born 1992)

Personal information
- Born: 20 June 1992 (age 34); Cape Province, South Africa
- Batting: Right handed
- Bowling: Right-arm fast
- Role: Bowler

Career statistics
Competition	FC	LA	T20
Matches	3	2	1
Runs scored	4	0	0
Batting average	2.00	0	0
100s/50s	0/0	0/0	0/0
Top score	4	0	18
Catches/stumpings	2/0	1/0	0/0
- Source: ESPNcricinfo, 4 September 2016

Simphiwe Yiba is a South African first-class cricketer. He is a right-handed batsman and a wicketkeeper. He made his First Class debut for Western Province against Griqualand West.
