= Javier Mendoza =

Javier Mendoza may refer to:

- Javier Mendoza (boxer) (born 1991), Mexican boxer
- Javier Mendoza (footballer) (born 1992), Argentine footballer
- Javier Jose Mendoza (born 1978), Mexican American conductor
