= Alberto Rossel =

Peruvian boxer

Personal information
- Nickname: Chiquito
- Born: Basilio Alberto Rossel Contreras; January 26, 1975 (age 51) Huaral, Huaral, Peru
- Height: 5 ft 1 in (155 cm)
- Weight: Light flyweight; Flyweight; Super flyweight

Boxing career
- Reach: 62 in (157 cm)
- Stance: Orthodox

Boxing record
- Total fights: 44
- Wins: 34
- Win by KO: 13
- Losses: 9
- No contests: 1

Alberto Rossel Contreras (born January 26, 1975) is a Peruvian former professional boxer who competed from 1998 to 2015.

== Professional career ==
He unsuccessfully challenged for the WBA super flyweight title in 2010 against Hugo Cázares. He would drop down to light-flyweight and win the WBA interim world title in 2012. He would defend the title four times before being named full champion after reigning titleholder Kazuto Ioka moved up to flyweight. He would lose the title to Japanese contender Ryoichi Taguchi.

== Professional boxing record ==
44 fights	34 wins	9 losses
By knockout	13	3
By decision	21	6
No contests	1	

No.	Result	Record	Opponent	Type	Round, time	Date	Location	Notes
44	Win	34–9 (1)	Carlos Correa	UD	8	5 Sep 2015	Coliseo Cerrado, Puerto Maldonado, Peru	
43	Win	33–9 (1)	Jeison Cervantes	UD	8	25 Apr 2015	Coliseo Mauro Mina, Lima, Peru	
42	Loss	32–9 (1)	Ryoichi Taguchi	UD	12	31 Dec 2014	Ota City General Gymnasium, Tokyo, Japan	Lost WBA light-flyweight title
41	Win	32–8 (1)	Gabriel Mendoza	UD	12	8 Mar 2014	Coliseo Eduardo Dibos, Lima, Peru	Retained WBA Interim light-flyweight title
40	Win	31–8 (1)	Jose Zuniga Vazquez	MD	12	28 Sep 2013	Mega Plaza Norte, Lima, Peru	Retained WBA Interim light-flyweight title
39	Win	30–8 (1)	Walter Tello	UD	12	16 Mar 2013	Coliseo Miguel Grau, Lima, Peru	Retained WBA Interim light-flyweight title
38	Win	29–8 (1)	Karluis Diaz	UD	12	18 Aug 2012	Coliseo Miguel Grau, Callao, Peru	Retained WBA Interim light-flyweight title
37	Win	28–8 (1)	José Alfredo Rodríguez	UD	12	14 Apr 2012	Coliseo Eduardo Dibos, Lima, Peru	Won WBA Interim light-flyweight title
36	Win	27–8 (1)	Jorge Saquinga	TKO	6 (10)	17 Dec 2011	Coliseo ReserClub de Pueblo Libre, Lima, Peru	
35	Win	26–8 (1)	Carlos Correa	UD	10	22 Oct 2011	Colegio La Salle, Lima, Peru	
34	Win	25–8 (1)	Luis Trejo	TKO	2 (10), 1:15	26 Mar 2011	Coliseo ReserClub de Pueblo Libre, Lima, Peru	
33	Loss	24–8 (1)	Hugo Cázares	TKO	9 (12), 0:31	9 Oct 2010	Centro de Convenciones, Tlalnepantla de Baz, Mexico	For WBA super-flyweight title
32	Win	24–7 (1)	Luis Singo	MD	11	31 Jul 2010	Colegio Salesiano, Lima, Peru	Retained WBA Fedelatin flyweight title
31	Win	23–7 (1)	Cristian Gallegos	KO	2 (10)	13 Mar 2010	Colegio Salesiano, Lima, Peru	
30	Win	22–7 (1)	Reginaldo Martins Carvalho	KO	2 (11)	28 Nov 2009	Colegio La Salle, Lima, Peru	Won vacant WBA Fedelatin flyweight title
29	Win	21–7 (1)	Alfonso De la Hoz	UD	9	12 Sep 2009	Plaza de Armad de Breña, Lima, Peru	Won vacant WBA Fedebol flyweight title
28	Win	20–7 (1)	Luis Singo	UD	10	9 May 2009	Plaza de Armas de Breña, Lima, Peru	
27	Win	19–7 (1)	Edwin Ortega Santa Cruz	TKO	4 (12)	26 Oct 2008	Hotel Maria Angola, Lima, Peru	Won vacant UBC Intercontinental flyweight title
26	Loss	18–7 (1)	Vusi Malinga	KO	5 (12), 2:50	24 Aug 2007	Nasrec Indoor Arena, Johannesburg, South Africa	For WBC International bantamweight title
25	Win	18–6 (1)	Guillermo Dejeas	KO	5 (10)	30 Jul 2007	Sheraton Hotel Lima, Lima, Peru	
24	Loss	17–6 (1)	Luis Alberto Lazarte	UD	10	13 Jan 2007	Club Atlético Quilmes, Mar del Plata, Argentima	
23	Win	17–5 (1)	Luis Trejo	UD	10	1 Apr 2006	Sheraton Hotel Lima, Lima, Peru	
22	Win	16–5 (1)	Marcos Ahumada	TKO	2 (10)	4 Mar 2006	Hotel Maria Angola, Lima, Peru	
21	Win	15–5 (1)	Diego Tirado	KO	2 (10)	17 Dec 2005	Coliseo Mauro Mina, Lima, Peru	
20	Win	14–5 (1)	Efrain Quispe	TKO	9 (10)	7 May 2005	Sheraton Hotel Lima, Lima, Peru	
19	Win	13–5 (1)	Rafael Tirado	UD	10	12 Mar 2005	Sheraton Hotel Lima, Lima, Peru	
18	Win	12–5 (1)	William Suarez	UD	6	20 Dec 2003	Coliseo La Paz Villa El Salvador, Lima, Peru	
17	Win	11–5 (1)	Liborio Romero	UD	4	22 Feb 2003	Arrowhead Pond, Anaheim, California, U.S.	
16	Loss	10–5 (1)	Brian Viloria	MD	12	24 Nov 2002	Sports Plus Events Center, Lake Grove, New York, U.S.	For NABF flyweight title
15	Win	10–4 (1)	Bruce Smith	UD	4	11 Oct 2002	Sloan Convention Center, Bowling Green, Kentucky, U.S.	
14	Loss	9–4 (1)	Nestor Hugo Paniagua	UD	6	4 Oct 2002	Plaza Hotel & Casino, Downtown Las Vegas, Nevada, U.S.	
13	NC	9–3 (1)	Brian Viloria	NC	3 (10), 1:07	26 Jul 2002	Mountaineer Casino, Chester, West Virginia, U.S.	NC after Rossel cut from accidental head clash
12	Win	9–3	Luis Noe	UD	4	5 Apr 2002	Lima, Peru	
11	Win	8–3	Luis Cox Coronado	UD	8	28 Nov 2001	Lima, Peru	
10	Loss	7–3	Ramases Patterson	UD	4	7 Oct 2001	Grand Victoria Casino Elgin, Elgin, Illinois, U.S.	
9	Loss	7–2	Iván Calderón	UD	6	26 Aug 2001	El San Juan Hotel & Casino, San Juan, Puerto Rico	
8	Win	7–1	Adeniji Washington	UD	4	7 Aug 2001	Belterra Casino Resort & Spa, Elizabeth, Indiana, U.S.	
7	Loss	6–1	Daniel Reyes	TKO	4 (10)	17 Mar 2000	Cartagena, Colombia	
6	Win	6–0	Luis Noe	UD	8	11 Jun 1999	Lima, Peru	
5	Win	5–0	Luis Noe	UD	8	21 May 1999	Lima, Peru	
4	Win	4–0	Cesar Farfan	TKO	5 (6)	20 Apr 1999	Lima, Peru	
3	Win	3–0	Jorge Montero	TKO	7 (8)	14 Aug 1998	Lima, Peru	
2	Win	2–0	Mique Poma	KO	1 (6)	22 May 1998	Lima, Peru	
1	Win	1–0	Michel Vargas	KO	2 (4)	6 Mar 1998	Lima, Peru	

== See also ==
- List of world light-flyweight boxing champions

Sporting positions
Regional boxing titles
Vacant Title last held by Jhon Alberto Molina	WBA Fedebol flyweight Champion; September 12, 2009 – November 28, 2009; Won Fedelatin title	Vacant Title next held by Josber Perez
Vacant Title last held by Luis Concepción	WBA Fedelatin flyweight Champion; November 28, 2009 – 20011; Vacated	Vacant Title next held by Ricardo Núñez
World boxing titles
Preceded by José Alfredo Rodríguez	WBA light-flyweight champion Interim title April 14, 2012 – July 10, 2014; Promoted	Vacant Title next held by Randy Petalcorin
Preceded by Kazuto Ioka; Vacated	WBA light-flyweight champion July 10, 2014 – December 31, 2014	Succeeded by Ryoichi Taguchi
