= Fahlan Sakkreerin Jr. =

Thai boxer

Personal information
- Nationality: Thai
- Born: Teeraphong Utaida; 7 June 1993 (age 33) Buriram, Thailand
- Height: 168 cm (5 ft 6 in)
- Weight: Mini flyweight Junior flyweight

Boxing career
- Reach: 170 cm (67 in)
- Stance: Orthodox

Boxing record
- Total fights: 47
- Wins: 39
- Win by KO: 21
- Losses: 7
- Draws: 1
- No contests: 0

Teeraphong Utaida (Thai: ธีระพงษ์ อุทัยดา; born 7 June 1993), who boxes as Fahlan Sakkreerin Jr. (ฟ้าลั่นจูเนียร์ ศักดิ์กรีรินทร์), or Fahlanjunior Kasetphatthana (ฟ้าลั่นจูเนียร์ เกษตรพัฒนา), is a Thai professional boxer in Mini flyweight and Junior flyweight divisions.

== Biography and career ==
Teeraphong Utaida, nicknamed "Champ," is the son of Fahlan Sakkreerin, a retired boxer who was a world champion in both the IBF Mini Flyweight and WBF Flyweight divisions during the 1990s. He inherited his father's love for boxing, beginning with Muay Thai. However, he did not find much success in that discipline, so he transitioned to professional boxing under Kiat Kreerin Promotion, following in his father's footsteps at the age of 17.

He made his pro debut in 2010 with a first-round knockout victory over fellow Thai boxer Wisanlek Sithsaithong. Prior to that, he also competed in amateur boxing tournaments presented by PTT.

He gained broader recognition on December 31, 2013, when he knocked out Japanese Ryo Miyazaki, a former WBA Minimumweight world champion, in the third round at Bodymaker Colosseum in Osaka, Japan. Since then, his manager Ekarat "Jimmy" Chaichotchuang has been hopeful that he could follow his father's path and become a world champion.

On April 22, 2015, Teeraphong challenged Katsunari Takayama for the IBF Mini Flyweight world title at Osaka Prefectural Gymnasium. He was defeated in the ninth round by decision, with judges' scores of 86–85, 90–81, and 87–84. After the fight, Takayama was found to have a facial fracture and could not continue fighting. Although Teeraphong had caused significant bleeding in the eighth round with clean punches, not due to a headbutt or accidental clash as defined by IBF rules, his manager's appeal for a rematch was unsuccessful.

He was later moved up to the Light Flyweight division and captured the IBF Pan Pacific Light Flyweight title with a win over Filipino boxer Lester Abutan on April 22, 2016, at the 7th Infantry Division in Mae Rim District, Chiang Mai Province.

On November 26, 2016, he challenged Milan Melindo, a fellow Filipino boxer, for the IBF Interim Junior Flyweight title at Cebu Coliseum in Cebu City, Philippines. At the time, he was ranked #3 and Melindo was ranked #6. The bout went the full distance, and Teeraphong lost by unanimous decision with scores of 117–111, 115–113, and 115–113.

On October 15, 2017, he faced Nicaraguan boxer Felix Alvarado at Puerto Salvador Allende in Managua, in a title eliminator bout to determine the next challenger for Milan Melindo's IBF Junior Flyweight title. He became the first Thai boxer to fight in Nicaragua in 49 years, since Chartchai Chionoi faced Ratón Mojica in 1968. Unfortunately, the fight was one-sided. Alvarado knocked him down late in the first round and then again in the third with a powerful right hook, resulting in a knockout loss.

== Professional boxing record ==
47 fights	39 wins	7 losses
By knockout	21	1
By decision	18	6
Draws	1	

No.	Result	Record	Opponent	Type	Round, Time	Date	Location	Notes
47	Win	39–7–1	Nirun Baonok	UD	4	12 Oct 2019	Kiatkririn Fitness & Martial Art, Bang Phli, Thailand	
46	Loss	38–7–1	Jayson Mama	UD	10	28 Mar 2019	Rongcheng Sports Center, Beijing, China	IBF Silk Road Champions Tournament Flyweight Final
45	Win	38–6–1	Orlie Silvestre	UD	12	19 Dec 2018	Pancharoen Market, Sai Noi, Thailand	Won vacant IBF Pan Pacific flyweight title
44	Win	37–6–1	Hengky Baransano	TKO	2 (12), 1:05	12 Sep 2018	Municipality of Bangbuathong, Nonthaburi, Thailand	Retained IBF Pan Pacific light flyweight title
43	Win	36–6–1	Richard Rosales	UD	12	22 Aug 2018	Ratirat Village, Bangbuathong, Nonthaburi, Thailand	Won vacant IBF Pan Pacific light flyweight title
42	Win	35–6–1	Chatchai Sithsaithong	TKO	3 (6)	21 Mar 2018	Suan Lum Night Bazaar Ratchadaphisek, Ratchadaphisek, Bangkok, Thailand	
41	Loss	34–6–1	Felix Alvarado	KO	3 (12), 2:17	14 Oct 2017	Puerto Salvador Allende, Managua, Nicaragua	
40	Win	34–5–1	Oscar Raknafa	TKO	7 (12), 0:28	20 Apr 2017	Ratirat Village, Sai Noi, Thailand	Won vacant IBF Asia Pacific light flyweight tirle
39	Loss	33–5–1	Milan Melindo	UD	12	16 Nov 2016	Cebu Coliseum, Cebu City, Philippines	For IBF Interim light flyweight title
38	Win	33–4–1	Stevanus Nana Bau	TKO	4 (12), 2:40	10 Jun 2016	Maejo University, Chiang Mai, Thailand	Retained IBF Pan Pacific light flyweight title
37	Win	32–4–1	Lester Abutan	SD	12	22 Apr 2016	7th Infantry Division, Mae Rim, Chiang Mai, Thailand	Won vacant IBF Pan Pacific light flyweight title
36	Win	31–4–1	Boy Tanto	UD	6	7 Dec 2015	Hua Hin Center, Hua Hin, Thailand	
35	Win	30–4–1	Oscar Raknafa	UD	8	27 Sep 2015	Central Plaza Westgate Department Store, Bangkok, Thailand	
34	Loss	29–4–1	Katsunari Takayama	TD	9 (12), 2:19	22 Apr 2015	Prefectural Gymnasium, Osaka, Japan	For IBF mini flyweight title; Unanimous technical decision
33	Win	29–3–1	Shunji Nagata	UD	12	20 Feb 2015	Ban Kuansamakki School, Kiensa, Surat Thani, Thailand	Retained IBF Asia light flyweight title
32	Win	28–3–1	Armando de la Cruz	UD	12	12 Dec 2014	Bangkok University, Thonburi Campus, Bangkok, Thailand	Won vacant IBF Asia light flyweight title
31	Win	27–3–1	Da Won Seo	UD	6	17 Oct 2014	Thanburi University, Thon Buri, Thailand	
30	Draw	26–3–1	Tatsuya Fukuhara	MD	8	10 Sep 2014	Liptapanlop Hall, Nakhon Ratchasima, Thailand	
29	Win	26–3	Domi Nenokeba	UD	6	20 Jun 2014	Municipality of Paborn, Phatthalung, Thailand	
28	Loss	25–3	Takuma Inoue	UD	8	6 Apr 2014	Ota City General Gymnasium, Tokyo, Japan	
27	Win	25–2	Ryo Miyazaki	KO	3 (10), 2:22	31 Dec 2013	Bodymaker Colosseum, Osaka, Japan	
26	Win	24–2	Wilber Andogan	PTS	8	16 Aug 2013	Viphavade, Surat Thani, Thailand	
25	Win	23–2	Samuel Tehuayo	PTS	6	21 Jun 2013	Bangkok University, Thonburi Campus, Thailand	
24	Win	22–2	Kid Suryana	TKO	2 (6)	17 May 2013	Wat Kanrud, Klung, Chanthaburi, Thailand	
23	Win	21–2	Madit Sada	PTS	8	19 Apr 2013	Trairatanakon Temple School, Chaiya, Thailand	
22	Win	20–2	Demsi Manufoe	TKO	1 (6), 1:35	15 Feb 2013	Wat Promthamnimit, Chom bueng, Thailand	
21	Win	19–2	Namphol Sithsaithong	TKO	2 (6)	26 Dec 2012	Rajapark Institute, Bangkok, Thailand	
20	Win	18–2	Pranpa Maehongson Sportcenter	TKO	4 (6)	16 Nov 2012	Pang Mu School, Muang, Maehongson, Thailand	
19	Loss	17–2	Manot Comput	PTS	6	19 Oct 2012	Ladprao, Bangkok, Thailand	
18	Win	17–1	Den Sithsaithong	TKO	2 (6)	17 Aug 2012	Trat City Sports Centre, Trat, Thailand	
17	Win	16–1	Namphol Sithsaithong	PTS	6	27 Jun 2012	Taweethapisek School, Bangkok, Thailand	
16	Win	15–1	Yodkhunpol Sithmahachol	KO	8 (8)	20 Apr 2012	Saraphi School, Saraphi, Thailand	
15	Win	14–1	Simithra Sithsaithong	PTS	6	16 Mar 2012	Bangkok University, Thonburi Campus, Bangkok, Thailand	
14	Win	13–1	Den Sithsaithong	PTS	6	10 Jan 2012	Kasem Pattana, Phitsanulok, Thailand	
13	Win	12–1	Chatchai Sithsaithong	TKO	2 (6)	26 Oct 2011	Mahanakorn Floating Market, Bangkok, Thailand	
12	Win	11–1	Chaichana Sithsaithong	KO	2 (6)	9 Sep 2011	Phitsanulok, Thailand	
11	Win	10–1	Fahsanghan Por Lasuor	KO	4 (?)	19 Aug 2011	Samut Sakhon, Thailand	
10	Win	9–1	Yuthtajak Sithsaithong	KO	2 (6)	19 Jul 2011	Chumphon Buri, Surin, Thailand	
9	Win	8–1	Veerasak Chor Chu anan	KO	1 (6)	17 Jun 2011	Kirik University, Bangkok, Thailand	
8	Win	7–1	Daen Porthong gym	KO	? (?)	20 May 2011	Mayong OTOP Center, Rayong, Thailand	
7	Win	6–1	Namphol Por Thitima	PTS	4	11 Apr 2011	Bangkok Northern Bus Terminal, Bangkok, Thailand	
6	Win	5–1	Khompetch Sithsamart	TKO	3 (6)	18 Mar 2011	Co-Operation League of Thailand, Nonthaburi, Thailand	
5	Win	4–1	Seangpetch Sor Phisanuthep	PTS	4	16 Feb 2011	Bangkok University, Thonburi Campus, Bangkok, Thailand	
4	Win	3–1	Chatchai Sithsaithong	TKO	4 (4), 0:50	21 Jan 2011	Petkasem Management of Science School, Bangkok, Thailand	
3	Loss	2–1	Samartlek Kokietgym	PTS	4	17 Dec 2010	Choenbung, Ratchaburi, Thailand	
2	Win	2–0	Prabpram Sithsaithong	KO	2 (6), 2:55	15 Oct 2010	Chaophraya Park Hotel, Bangkok, Thailand	
1	Win	1–0	Wisanlek Sithsaithong	TKO	1 (6), 1:50	17 Sep 2010	Mashare Corporation, Bangkok, Thailand	

== Boxing style ==
Teeraphong is a skillful, defensive boxer, in contrast to his father, who was known for his aggressive fighting style.

== Titles in boxing ==
Regional/International Titles:

- IBF Pan Pacific Junior flyweight Champion (April 2016) (108 lbs)
- IBF Asia Junior flyweight Champion (December 2014) (April 2017) (2x)(108 lbs)
