= José Alfredo Rodríguez =

Mexican boxer

Personal information
- Nickname: Torito
- Born: José Alfredo Rodríguez Rojas; 26 September 1989 (age 37) Mazatlán, Sinaloa, Mexico
- Height: 5 ft 3 1/2 in (161 cm)
- Weight: Light flyweight; Flyweight; Super flyweight

Boxing career
- Reach: 65 1/2 in (166 cm)
- Stance: Orthodox

Boxing record
- Total fights: 42
- Wins: 32
- Win by KO: 19
- Losses: 10

José Alfredo Rodríguez (born 26 September 1989) is a Mexican professional boxer who held the WBA light flyweight interim title from 2011 to 2012. He challenged for the WBA world title in 2012 and also the IBF super flyweight title in 2017.

== Professional career ==
In August 2010, José beat undefeated Karluis Díaz for the vacant WBC Youth Intercontinental Light Flyweight title.

=== WBA light flyweight interim championship ===
On 19 November 2011 Rodríguez upset Nethra Sasiprapa to win the interim WBA Light Flyweight Championship.

=== IBF super Flyweight title challenge ===
On 29 January 2017 Rodríguez unsuccessfully challenged Jerwin Ancajas for the IBF super flyweight title.

== Professional boxing record ==
42 fights	32 wins	10 losses
By knockout	19	6
By decision	13	4

No.	Result	Record	Opponent	Type	Round, time	Date	Location	Notes
42	Loss	32–10	Antonio Nieves	TKO	2 (8)	2019-06-08	Northfield, Ohio, U.S.	
41	Loss	32–9	Tramaine Williams	TKO	1 (6)	2019-02-23	Genetti Manor, Wilkes-Barre, Pennsylvania, U.S.	
40	Loss	32–8	Jonathan Lopez Marcano	UD	6 (6)	2018-12-01	Parque de Pelota Pedro Cepeda, Catano, Puerto Rico	
39	Loss	32–7	Aston Palicte	TKO	5 (10)	2017-12-08	Round Rock Sports Center, Round Rock, Texas, U.S.	For NABF super flyweight title
38	Loss	32–6	Dewayne Beamon	KO	9 (12)	2017-07-29	Abundant Life Christian Center, Raleigh, North Carolina, U.S.	For IBO Inter-Continental super flyweight title
37	Loss	32–5	Jerwin Ancajas	RTD	7 (12)	2017-01-29	Cotai Arena, Macau, S.A.R.	For IBF super flyweight title
36	Win	32–4	Edwin Rodriguez	SD	8 (8)	2016-12-10	ABC Sports Complex, Springfield, Virginia, U.S.	
35	Win	31–4	Oscar Castillo	UD	8 (8)	2016-03-04	Opera Night Club, Culiacan, Sinaloa, Mexico	
34	Win	30–4	Patricio Camacho Valdez	KO	5 (6)	2016-02-26	Opera Night Club, Culiacan, Sinaloa, Mexico	
33	Loss	29–4	Valentin Leon	UD	6 (6)	2014-05-03	Palenque de la Feria Ganadera, Culiacan, Sinaloa, Mexico	
32	Loss	29–3	Milan Melindo	UD	12 (12)	2013-11-30	Araneta Coliseum, Quezon City, Metro Manila, Philippines	For vacant WBO International flyweight title
31	Win	29–2	Marvin Diaz Canales	TKO	2 (8)	2013-08-30	Gimnasio German Evers, Mazatlan, Sinaloa, Mexico	
30	Loss	28–2	Kazuto Ioka	TKO	6 (12)	2012-12-31	Bodymaker Colosseum, Osaka, Osaka, Japan	For vacant WBA (Regular) light Flyweight title
29	Loss	28–1	Alberto Rossel	UD	12 (12)	2012-04-14	Coliseo Eduardo Dibos, Lima, Peru	Lost interim WBA light Flyweight title
28	Win	28–0	Taned Jitkawee	SD	12 (12)	2011-11-19	Gimnasio German Evers, Mazatlan, Sinaloa, Mexico	Won interim WBA light Flyweight title
27	Win	27–0	Marvin Diaz Canales	TKO	2 (6)	2011-09-30	Arena Jalisco, Guadalajara, Jalisco, Mexico	
26	Win	26–0	Fred Heberto Valdez	KO	1 (8)	2011-08-06	Gimnasio Municipal, Navojoa, Sonora, Mexico	
25	Win	25–0	Jesus Limones	UD	10 (10)	2010-12-17	Gimnasio German Evers, Mazatlan, Sinaloa, Mexico	
24	Win	24–0	Karluis Diaz	TKO	7 (12)	2010-08-28	Lobodome, Mazatlan, Sinaloa, Mexico	Retained WBC Youth Intercontinental light Flyweight title
23	Win	23–0	Sammy Reyes	TKO	5 (8)	2010-06-26	Gimnasio German Evers, Mazatlan, Sinaloa, Mexico	Retained WBC Youth Intercontinental light Flyweight title
22	Win	22–0	Ivan Meneses	UD	10 (10)	2010-04-30	Gimnasio German Evers, Mazatlan, Sinaloa, Mexico	Retained WBC Youth Intercontinental light Flyweight title
21	Win	21–0	Sho Nakazawa	SD	8 (8)	2010-02-07	World Memorial Hall, Kobe, Hyogo, Japan	
20	Win	20–0	Eduardo Gonzalez	UD	10 (10)	2009-12-12	Plaza de Toros Rea, Mazatlan, Sinaloa, Mexico	Won WBC Youth Intercontinental light Flyweight title
19	Win	19–0	Francisco Soto	UD	10 (10)	2009-08-21	Gimnasio German Evers, Mazatlan, Sinaloa, Mexico	
18	Win	18–0	Elfego Hernandez Sierra	KO	4 (10)	2009-07-03	Gimnasio German Evers, Mazatlan, Sinaloa, Mexico	
17	Win	17–0	Marcelo Gerardo Lopez	RTD	6 (10)	2009-04-10	Gimnasio German Evers, Mazatlan, Sinaloa, Mexico	
16	Win	16–0	Pedro Antonio Rodriguez	KO	2 (6)	2009-03-14	Auditorio Centenario, Torreon, Coahuila de Zaragoza, Mexico	
15	Win	15–0	Vicente Hernandez	KO	3 (10)	2009-02-28	Gimnasio German Evers, Mazatlan, Sinaloa, Mexico	
14	Win	14–0	Hugo Olvera	TKO	2 (6)	2009-02-14	Gimnasio German Evers, Mazatlan, Sinaloa, Mexico	
13	Win	13–0	Jorge Cruz	KO	3 (6)	2008-12-19	Gimnasio German Evers, Mazatlan, Sinaloa, Mexico	
12	Win	12–0	Mario Rodríguez	UD	8 (8)	2008-08-29	Gimnasio German Evers, Mazatlan, Sinaloa, Mexico	
11	Win	11–0	Hugo Olvera	TKO	6 (6)	2008-08-01	Gimnasio German Evers, Mazatlan, Sinaloa, Mexico	
10	Win	10–0	Daniel Contreras Jr	TKO	3 (6)	2008-06-20	Gimnasio Dr. Solórzano, Mazatlan, Sinaloa, Mexico	
9	Win	9–0	Gabriel Lopez	UD	6 (6)	2008-05-16	Gimnasio German Evers, Mazatlan, Sinaloa, Mexico	
8	Win	8–0	Jesús Silvestre	UD	6 (6)	2008-04-18	Gimnasio German Evers, Mazatlan, Sinaloa, Mexico	
7	Win	7–0	Trinidad Ruiz	KO	2 (4)	2008-03-14	Gimnasio German Evers, Mazatlan, Sinaloa, Mexico	
6	Win	6–0	German Aaron Cota	UD	4 (4)	2007-12-21	Gimnasio German Evers, Mazatlan, Sinaloa, Mexico	
5	Win	5–0	Leonardo Rodriguez	KO	2 (4)	2007-11-16	Gimnasio German Evers, Mazatlan, Sinaloa, Mexico	
4	Win	4–0	Doroteo Aguilera	KO	3 (4)	2007-09-28	Gimnasio German Evers, Mazatlan, Sinaloa, Mexico	
3	Win	3–0	German Aaron Cota	UD	4 (4)	2007-08-03	Gimnasio German Evers, Mazatlan, Sinaloa, Mexico	
2	Win	2–0	Arturo Ramirez	TKO	3 (?)	2007-05-26	Gimnasio German Evers, Mazatlan, Sinaloa, Mexico	
1	Win	1–0	Mauro Gonzalez	KO	1 (4)	2007-03-30	Gimnasio German Evers, Mazatlan, Sinaloa, Mexico	

Sporting positions
World boxing titles
Vacant Title last held by Román González	WBA light flyweight champion Interim title 19 November 2011 – 14 April 2012	Succeeded by Alberto Rossel
