= Milan Melindo =

Filipino boxer (born 1988)

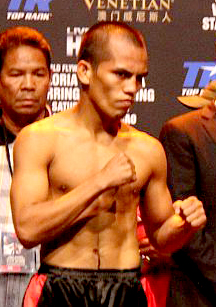
- Milan poses during his weigh-in against Seran in Macau (April 2013)

Personal information
- Nicknames: El Metodico ( Method Man ) Milenyo ( Millennium )
- Nationality: Filipino
- Born: February 29, 1988 (age 38) Cagayan de Oro, Philippines
- Height: 5 ft 2 in (157 cm)
- Weight: Mini-flyweight; Light-flyweight; Flyweight

Boxing career
- Reach: 65 1/2 in (166 cm)
- Stance: Orthodox

Boxing record
- Total fights: 46
- Wins: 40
- Win by KO: 14
- Losses: 6

Milan Melindo (born February 29, 1988) is a Filipino professional boxer who held the IBF and IBO light-flyweight titles in 2017. He also challenged for the unified WBA (Super) and WBO flyweight titles in 2013 and the IBF, WBA (Super), and WBC light-flyweight titles between 2015 and 2018.

== Early life ==
Milan Melindo was born on February 29, 1988, in Cagayan de Oro, Philippines. His passion for boxing came from his father, who bought him a pair of boxing gloves. When Melindo was 6 years of age his father trained him and introduce him to the sport of boxing. Growing up, Melindo took boxing as a hobby because it was through this sport he was able to continue his study through a scholarship program. When he graduated from high school, Melindo decided to take boxing seriously to help his family's financial needs. Melindo kept his unbeaten record going by defeating his veteran opponent via unanimous decision with the scores of 97–93, 98–92, and 96–94.

== Fighting style ==
Melindo is considered one of the most skillful and promising boxers in the now-disbanded ALA (Antonio Lopez Aldeguer) boxing gym, although somewhat lacking in punching power. In fact, he scored only 13 KO's in 37 wins; most of these KO victories came when he was fighting in the minimumweight division. Despite the lack of punching power, he makes up for it with his quick combinations and his ability to double-up his patented left hook.

== Professional career ==
=== Early years at minimumweight ===
Melindo made his professional debut on September 17, 2005, defeating fellow Filipino boxer Meljun Grumo by unanimous decision at the Sports and Cultural Complex in Mandaue City, Cebu, Philippines.

Melindo won his first ever title, the vacant WBO Asia Pacific minimumweight championship, on October 6, 2007, by defeating Pongpan Patanakan Gym of Thailand via technical knockout in the 4th round. The two fought at the Mindanao Polytechnic State College in Cagayan de Oro. The Thai boxer was floored two times in the round, and the bout was stopped after a devastating knockout that left him unconscious for several minutes. Melindo defended the title in his next fight against Jack Amisa, whom he defeated by unanimous decision on December 2, 2007.

On March 14, 2009, Melindo took on Indonesia's Muhammad Rachman at the Waterfront Cebu City Hotel in Cebu City, Cebu. He kept his unbeaten record going by defeating his veteran opponent via unanimous decision with the scores of 97–93, 98–92, and 96–94.

=== Light flyweight ===
Melindo won the WBA Inter-Continental light flyweight title on July 26, 2008, by defeating Carlos Melo from Panama at the Cebu Coliseum in Cebu City. Melindo won on points with scores of 117–111, 116-112 and 117–111.

=== Flyweight ===
On January 14, 2010, Melindo fought Anthony Villareal for the World Boxing Council (WBC) Youth Intercontinental flyweight championship belt at the Waterfront Cebu City Hotel. The bout was part of the boxing event named "Bakbakan sa Sinulog". The unbeaten boxer defeated his foe by unanimous decision with the scores of :97-93, 95–94, and 96–93. Melindo kept his unbeaten record after 20 fights with five of his wins coming by way of knockout, while his opponent suffered his third loss against nine wins (4 KO).

After letting the deposed champion to take control of the action in the opening minutes of the first round, Melindo picked up the pace in the final half by knocking down Villareal in the final seconds with a solid right during an exchange. Stunned but not totally hurt by Melindo's right, Villareal again started out strong in the second but his aggressiveness was once again silenced by another right from the Filipino challenger. Melindo slowly took control of the fight in the third round, when he began to throw more powerful against the tough opponent. Villareal became desperate to turn things around in the final rounds when he threw punches in volumes but most of his shots were wild and didn't hit Melindo.

Melindo was scheduled to face Devis Perez of Colombia on April 10, 2010, at the Dubai Tennis Arena in Dubai, United Arab Emirates. However, the fight was postponed to April 23 because of the non appearance of Bobby Pacquiao in one of the featured fights on April 9.

A day before the fight, Perez was replaced by Thailand's Komrit Twinsgym, who arrived only the previous night in Dubai as a last minute replacement of original opponent of Columbia who failed to make his way here after flights in Europe were disrupted due to Iceland volcanic ash hovering above the continent. The Melindo-Twinsgym bout was the Filipino's first fight outside the Philippines. The Cagayan de Oro native won the bout by TKO in the 4th round.

The undefeated fighter Melindo (21–0–0, 6KO) who was defending his WBC Youth Intercontinental title, floored Komrit Twinsgym (15–4–0, 11KO) in the first minute of the first round and again towards the end of the round looking to make short work of the travel-weary Thai. Komrit refused to let go and flurried Melindo with some combinations during heated exchanges with the stalking Melindo in the second and third round. Komrit was caught by Melindo's solid punches in the fourth round and was sent to the canvas again. Veteran referee Bruce McTavish didn't count the Thai boxer and stopped the contest, allowing Melindo to retain his title. On August 28, 2010, Melindo fought Jin-Man Jeon at the Waterfront Cebu City Hotel in Cebu. The Filipino pugilist won the bout by TKO in the 2nd round.

==== Other events ====
On March 11, 2010, Melindo received an award in the 28th SAC-SMB Cebu Sports Awards, along with four other Filipino boxers: Z Gorres, Donnie Nietes, Rodel Mayol and Johnriel Casimero. The event was organized by the Sportswriters Association of Cebu (SAC) and held at the Casino Español de Cebu.

== Professional boxing record ==
46 fights	40 wins	6 losses
By knockout	14	2
By decision	26	4

No.	Result	Record	Opponent	Type	Round, time	Date	Location	Notes
46	Win	40–6	Mchanja Yohana	UD	10	Dec 29, 2023	SM Seaside City Sky Hall, Cebu City, Philippines	
45	Loss	39–6	Jong Seon Kang	UD	10	Jul 1, 2023	University Gym, Bucheon, South Korea	Lost OPBF Silver featherweight title
44	Win	39–5	Chaiwat Buatkrathok	UD	10	Jan 11, 2023	Cebu City Sports Complex, Cebu City, Philippines	Won vacant OPBF Silver featherweight title
43	Win	38–5	Crison Omayao	RTD	6 (8), 3:00	Apr 2, 2022	Southern City Colleges, Zamboanga City, Philippines	
42	Loss	37–5	Junto Nakatani	TKO	6 (12), 2:02	Oct 5, 2019	Korakuen Hall, Bunkyo, Tokyo, Japan	
41	Loss	37–4	Kenshiro Teraji	TKO	7 (12), 2:47	Oct 7, 2018	Yokohama Arena, Kanagawa, Japan	For WBC light flyweight title
40	Loss	37–3	Ryoichi Taguchi	UD	12	Dec 31, 2017	Ota City General Gymnasium, Ota, Tokyo, Japan	Lost IBF light flyweight title; For WBA and vacant The Ring light flyweight titles
39	Win	37–2	Hekkie Budler	SD	12	Sep 16, 2017	Waterfront Hotel and Casino, Cebu City, Cebu, Philippines	Retained IBF light flyweight title
38	Win	36–2	Akira Yaegashi	TKO	1 (12), 2:45	May 21, 2017	Ariake Colosseum, Tokyo, Japan	Won IBF light flyweight title
37	Win	35–2	Teeraphong Utaida	UD	12	Nov 26, 2016	Cebu Coliseum, Cebu City, Cebu, Philippines	Won interim IBF light flyweight title
36	Win	34–2	Maximino Flores	TD	7 (10), 0:54	May 28, 2016	La Salle Coliseum, Bacolod, Philippines	
35	Win	33–2	Victor Emanuel Olivo	SD	10	Nov 28, 2015	Hoops Dome, Lapu-Lapu City, Cebu, Philippines	
34	Loss	32–2	Javier Mendoza	TD	6 (12), 2:39	May 31, 2015	Auditorio Municipal Fausto Gutiérrez Moreno, Tijuana, Baja California, Mexico	For IBF light flyweight title
33	Win	32–1	Saúl Juárez	UD	12	Nov 15, 2014	Waterfront Cebu City Hotel & Casino, Cebu City, Cebu, Philippines	
32	Win	31–1	Martin Tecuapetla	MD	12	May 10, 2014	Mall of Asia Arena, Pasay City, Metro Manila, Philippines	
31	Win	30–1	José Alfredo Rodríguez	UD	12	Nov 30, 2013	Smart Araneta Coliseum, Quezon City, Metro Manila, Philippines	Won WBO International flyweight title
30	Loss	29–1	Juan Francisco Estrada	UD	12	Jul 27, 2013	CotaiArena, The Venetian Macao, Macau	For WBA (Unified) and WBO flyweight titles
29	Win	29–0	Tommy Seran	TKO	4 (12), 2:38	Apr 6, 2013	CotaiArena, The Venetian Macao, Macau	
28	Win	28–0	Jean Piero Pérez	MD	12	Sep 22, 2012	Waterfront Cebu City Hotel & Casino, Cebu City, Cebu, Philippines	
27	Win	27–0	Jesús Géles	KO	1 (12), 2:21	Jun 2, 2012	Newport Performing Arts Theatre, Pasay, Metro Manila, Philippines	Won WBO International flyweight title
26	Win	26–0	Juan Esquer	KO	7 (12), 2:16	Jan 28, 2012	Waterfront Cebu City Hotel & Casino, Cebu City, Cebu, Philippines	Retained WBO Inter-Continental flyweight title
25	Win	25–0	Francisco Rosas	KO	1 (10), 2:59	Sep 10, 2011	Waterfront Cebu City Hotel & Casino, Cebu City, Cebu, Philippines	Won WBO Inter-Continental flyweight title
24	Win	24–0	Rosendo Vega	KO	1 (10), 2:59	Mar 19, 2011	Waterfront Cebu City Hotel & Casino, Cebu City, Cebu, Philippines	
23	Win	23–0	Carlos Tamara	UD	10	Nov 27, 2010	Waterfront Cebu City Hotel & Casino, Cebu City, Cebu, Philippines	
22	Win	22–0	Jin-Man Jeon	KO	2 (10), 0:43	Aug 28, 2010	Waterfront Cebu City Hotel & Casino, Cebu City, Cebu, Philippines	
21	Win	21–0	Komrit Lukkuongmuekol	TKO	4 (10)	Apr 23, 2010	The Lodge, Chi Garden, Dubai	Retained WBA Inter-Continental light flyweight title
20	Win	20–0	Anthony Villarreal	UD	10	Jan 14, 2010	Waterfront Cebu City Hotel & Casino, Cebu City, Cebu, Philippines	Retained WBA Inter-Continental light flyweight title
19	Win	19–0	Jose Guadalupe Martinez	UD	10	Oct 3, 2009	Cuneta Astrodome, Pasay, Metro Manila, Philippines	Retained WBO Asia Pacific mini flyweight title
18	Win	18–0	Muhammad Rachman	UD	10	Mar 14, 2009	Waterfront Cebu City Hotel & Casino, Cebu City, Cebu, Philippines	
17	Win	17–0	Juma Fundi	TKO	3 (12), 1:20	Oct 30, 2008	Atrium, Limketkai Mall, Cagayan de Oro, Philippines	Retained WBO Asia Pacific mini flyweight title
16	Win	16–0	Carlos Melo	UD	12	Jul 26, 2008	Cebu Coliseum, Cebu City, Cebu, Philippines	Won WBA Inter-Continental light flyweight title
15	Win	15–0	Sofyan Effendi	UD	10	Mar 7, 2008	Mandaue City Sports and Cultural Complex, Mandaue City, Cebu, Philippines	
14	Win	14–0	Jack Amisa	UD	12	Dec 2, 2007	Smart Araneta Coliseum, Quezon City, Metro Manila, Philippines	Retained WBO Asia Pacific mini flyweight title
13	Win	13–0	Nuapayak Sakkririn	TKO	4 (12)	Oct 6, 2007	Don Mariano Polytechnic College Gym, Cagayan de Oro, Philippines	Won vacant WBO Asia Pacific mini flyweight title
12	Win	12–0	Arnel Tadena	TKO	4 (10), 1:03	Jun 26, 2007	Bantayan Multi-Purpose Center, Bantayan, Cebu, Philippines	
11	Win	11–0	Wendil Cajoles	UD	10	May 10, 2007	Bahay Toro, Quezon City, Metro Manila, Philippines	
10	Win	10–0	Alex Aroy	TD	6 (6)	Feb 24, 2007	Cebu City Sports Complex, Cebu City, Cebu, Philippines	
9	Win	9–0	Fabio Marfa	UD	10	Jan 20, 2007	Mandaue City Sports and Cultural Complex, Mandaue City, Cebu, Philippines	
8	Win	8–0	Rommel Bongon	UD	8	Nov 24, 2006	Mandaue City Sports and Cultural Complex, Mandaue City, Cebu, Philippines	
7	Win	7–0	Ricardo Albia	TKO	3 (8)	Oct 21, 2006	Mandaue City Sports and Cultural Complex, Mandaue City, Cebu, Philippines	
6	Win	6–0	Michael Rodriguez	UD	10	Jul 3, 2006	Island City Mall, Tagbilaran City, Bohol, Philippines	
5	Win	5–0	Amero Ricablanca	UD	4	Apr 30, 2006	Island City Mall, Tagbilaran City, Bohol, Philippines	
4	Win	4–0	Ruther del Castillo	TD	5 (6), 1:40	Feb 3, 2006	Roosevelt Ave. & Del Monte Ave., Quezon City, Metro Manila, Philippines	
3	Win	3–0	Rodel Emboy	TKO	4 (6), 1:41	Dec 30, 2005	CPG Multi-Purpose Center, Talibon, Bohol, Philippines	
2	Win	2–0	Juaren Libres	UD	4	Oct 29, 2005	Mandaue City Sports and Cultural Complex, Mandaue City, Cebu, Philippines	
1	Win	1–0	Meljun Grumo	UD	4	Sep 17, 2005	Mandaue City Sports and Cultural Complex, Mandaue City, Cebu, Philippines	

== Titles in boxing ==
Major World Titles:

- IBF Light Flyweight Champion (108 lbs)

Minor World Titles:

- IBF Interim Light Flyweight Champion (November 2016) (108 lbs)

Regional/International Titles:

- WBO International Flyweight Champion (June 2012) (November 2013) (2x)(112 lbs)
- WBO Inter-Continental Flyweight Champion (September 2011) (112 lbs)
- WBA Inter-Continental Light Flyweight Champion (July 2008) (108 lbs)
- WBO Asia Pacific Minimumweight Champion (October 2007) (105 lbs)

== See also ==
- List of light-flyweight boxing champions

Achievements
Vacant Title last held by Johnriel Casimero	IBF light flyweight champion interim title November 26, 2016 - May 21, 2017; Won full title	Vacant
Preceded by Akira Yaegashi	IBF light flyweight champion May 21, 2017 - December 31, 2017	Succeeded by Ryoichi Taguchi
