= Ryoichi Taguchi =

Japanese boxer

Personal information
- Nationality: Japanese
- Born: 田口良一; 1 December 1986 (age 39) Tokyo, Japan
- Height: 5 ft 6 in (168 cm)
- Weight: Light-flyweight

Boxing career
- Reach: 67 in (170 cm)
- Stance: Orthodox

Boxing record
- Total fights: 33
- Wins: 27
- Win by KO: 12
- Losses: 4
- Draws: 2

Ryoichi Taguchi (田口 良一, Taguchi Ryōichi; born 1 December 1986) is a Japanese former professional boxer who competed from 2006 to 2019. He was a unified light-flyweight world champion, having held the WBA title from 2014 to 2018 and the IBF and Ring magazine titles from 2017 to 2018.

== Professional career ==
=== Early career ===
Taguchi made his professional debut on July 19, 2006, against Tomohiro Seo and won the fight by a first-round knockout. By December 28, 2009, he had amassed a 10–1 record, with four of those victories coming by way of stoppage.

In late 2011, Taguchi entered the Japanese light-flyweight contender tournament, held to determine the next Japanese light-flyweight title challenger. He faced Tetsuya Hisada in the tournament semifinals, held on July 5, 2011, and won the fight by unanimous decision. Taguchi faced Yu Kimura in the tournament finals, held on October 15, 2011, and won the fight by a sixth-round technical knockout.

==== Japan light-flyweight champion ====
Taguchi challenged the Japanese light-flyweight champion Masayuki Kuroda on March 12, 2012, at the Korakuen Hall in Tokyo, Japan. The fight was ruled a split decision draw after ten rounds were contested. Taguchi was afterwards scheduled to face Eakkasit Jaikongkaew on July 16, 2012. Eakkasit failed to make weight for the bout and was accordingly banned from competing in Japan by the JBC for a period of one year, although he was still allowed to fight Taguchi. Taguchi won the fight by a first-round knockout.

Taguchi was scheduled to fight Yuki Chinen for the vacant Japanese light-flyweight title on April 3, 2013. He won the ten-round bout by unanimous decision, with scores of 99–91, 98-92 and 97–93. During his post-fight interview, Taguchi called out the #6 ranked Japanese light-flyweight Naoya Inoue for his first title defense. His wish granted by the JBC, Taguchi was scheduled to face Inoue on August 25, 2013, in his first title defense. Taguchi lost the fight, his second professional loss, by unanimous decision, with scores of 98–92, 98-93 and 97–94.

Taguchi returned to action four months later to face Ryan Bito on December 31, 2013, in a 49.5 kg catchweight bout. He won the fight by unanimous decision, with scores of 78–74, 78-75 and 78–74. Taguchi was next scheduled to face the former IBF minimumweight champion Florante Condes on July 5, 2014. He won the fight by unanimous decision, narrowly edging out the former champion with scores of 77–74, 77-74 and 76–75.

=== Light-flyweight champion ===
==== WBA light-flyweight champion ====
Taguchi was scheduled to challenge Alberto Rossel for the WBA light-flyweight title on December 31, 2014, at the Ota City General Gymnasium in Tokyo, Japan. The bout presented Rossel's first title defense, after being promoted to status of undisputed champion following Kazuto Ioka's move up in weight. Taguchi won the fight by unanimous decision, with scores of 116–110, 116-111 and 117–109. He quickly overwhelmed Rossel and twice knocked him down with a body shot, in rounds eight and nine.

Taguchi made his first title defense against Kwanthai Sithmorseng on May 6, 2015, at the Ota City General Gymnasium in Tokyo, Japan. Kwanthai, a former WBA titlist at minimumweight, was ranked as the #14 light-flyweight in the WBA rankings at the time of the bout's scheduling. Taguchi won the fight by an eight-round technical knockout, stopping his opponent with repeated body shots. Prior to the stoppage, Kwanthai was knocked down in the second, fifth and seventh rounds.

Taguchi was scheduled to make the second defense of his title against the #7 ranked WBA light-flyweight Luis de la Rosa on December 31, 2015, at the Ota City General Gymnasium in Tokyo, Japan. At the end of the ninth round, after suffering a near-knockdown, de la Rosa retired from the fight although, at the time of the stoppage, he was ahead on two of the judges scorecards by 87-84 and 86–85 respectively, while the third judge scored the fight 87-84 for Taguchi.

Taguchi made his third title defense against the former WBA minimumweight champion Juan Jose Landaeta, who was at the time the #7 ranked WBA light-flyweight contender, on April 27, 2016. Like his previous three title fights, the fight took place at the Ota City General Gymnasium in Tokyo, Japan. Landaeta retired from the fight at the end of the eleventh round, after being knocked down five times in the preceding rounds.

Taguchi faced yet another former WBA minimumweight champion, Ryo Miyazaki, in his fourth title defense. Taguchi was scheduled to fight the #1 ranked WBA light-flyweight contender on August 31, 2016, at the Ota City General Gymnasium in Tokyo, Japan. He won the fight by unanimous decision, with scores of 116–112, 117-111 and 119–109. Following this victory, Taguchi was awarded the August Monthly Outstanding Fighter Award by the WBA.

Taguchi made his fifth title defense against the undefeated Carlos Cañizales, who was at the time the #3 ranked WBA light-flyweight contender, on December 31, 2016. The fight was ruled a split decision draw. Judges Derek Milham and Octavio Rodriguez each awarded a 116-112 scorecard to Cañizales and Taguchi respectively, while judge Philippe Verbeke scored the fight as a 114–114 draw.

Taguchi was scheduled to make his sixth title defense against Rober Barrera on July 23, 2017, at the Ota City General Gymnasium in Tokyo, Japan. Taguchi put in a dominant performance and won the fight by a ninth-round technical knockout, 24 seconds into the round.

==== WBA and IBF unified champion ====
After successfully defending his title six times, Taguchi was scheduled to fight the IBF light-flyweight champion Milan Melindo in a title unification bout. Additionally, the vacant The Ring light-flyweight title was on the stake as well. The super fight between the two champions was set for December 31, 2017, and was contested at the Ota City General Gymnasium in Tokyo, Japan, same as all of Taguchi's previous title fights. Taguchi beat Melindo by unanimous decision, who was unable to make use of his 4-inch height and reach advantage. Two judges scored the fight 117-111 for Taguchi, while the third judge awarded him a 116-111 scorecard. He was awarded the December Monthly Outstanding Fighter Award by the WBA.

Taguchi made his first title defense as a unified light-flyweight champion against the former minimumweight unified champion Hekkie Budler on May 20, 2018. Taguchi lost the fight by controversial decision, with scores of 114–113 on all three judge's scorecards. On November 20, 2018, Taguchi announced his retirement from the sport.

=== Move up to flyweight ===
Taguchi came of his retirement in early 2019, to challenge the newly crowned WBO flyweight champion Kosei Tanaka. The fight was scheduled for March 16, 2019, and was contested at the Memorial Center in Gifu, Japan. Tanaka won the fight by unanimous decision, with two judges scoring the fight 117–111 in his favor, while the third judge awarded Tanaka a 119-109 scorecard.

== Professional boxing record ==
33 fights	27 wins	4 losses
By knockout	12	0
By decision	14	4
By disqualification	1	0
Draws	2	

No.	Result	Record	Opponent	Type	Round, time	Date	Location	Notes
33	Loss	27–4–2	Kosei Tanaka	UD	12	16 Mar 2019	Memorial Center, Gifu, Japan	For WBO flyweight title
32	Loss	27–3–2	Hekkie Budler	UD	12	20 May 2018	Ota City General Gymnasium, Tokyo, Japan	Lost WBA (Unified), IBF, and The Ring light-flyweight titles
31	Win	27–2–2	Milan Melindo	UD	12	31 Dec 2017	Ota City General Gymnasium, Tokyo, Japan	Retained WBA (Unified) light-flyweight title; Won IBF and vacant The Ring light-flyweight titles
30	Win	26–2–2	Rober Barrera	TKO	9 (12), 0:24	23 Jul 2017	Ota City General Gymnasium, Tokyo, Japan	Retained WBA light-flyweight title
29	Draw	25–2–2	Carlos Cañizales	SD	12	31 Dec 2016	Ota City General Gymnasium, Tokyo, Japan	Retained WBA light-flyweight title
28	Win	25–2–1	Ryo Miyazaki	UD	12	31 Aug 2016	Ota City General Gymnasium, Tokyo, Japan	Retained WBA light-flyweight title
27	Win	24–2–1	Juan Jose Landaeta	RTD	11 (12), 3:00	27 Apr 2016	Ota City General Gymnasium, Tokyo, Japan	Retained WBA light-flyweight title
26	Win	23–2–1	Luis de la Rosa	RTD	9 (12), 3:00	31 Dec 2015	Ota City General Gymnasium, Tokyo, Japan	Retained WBA light-flyweight title
25	Win	22–2–1	Kwanthai Sithmorseng	TKO	8 (12), 0:36	6 May 2015	Ota City General Gymnasium, Tokyo, Japan	Retained WBA light-flyweight title
24	Win	21–2–1	Alberto Rossel	UD	12	31 Dec 2014	Ota City General Gymnasium, Tokyo, Japan	Won WBA light-flyweight title
23	Win	20–2–1	Florante Condes	UD	8	5 Jul 2014	Korakuen Hall, Tokyo, Japan	
22	Win	19–2–1	Ryan Bito	UD	8	31 Dec 2013	Ota City General Gymnasium, Tokyo, Japan	
21	Loss	18–2–1	Naoya Inoue	UD	10	25 Aug 2013	Sky Arena, Zama, Japan	Lost Japanese light-flyweight title
20	Win	18–1–1	Yuki Chinen	UD	10	3 Apr 2013	Korakuen Hall, Tokyo, Japan	Won vacant Japanese light-flyweight title
19	Win	17–1–1	Eakkasit Jaikongkaew	KO	1 (8)	16 Jul 2012	Winghat, Kasukabe, Japan	
18	Draw	16–1–1	Masayuki Kuroda	SD	10	12 Mar 2012	Korakuen Hall, Tokyo, Japan	For Japanese light-flyweight title
17	Win	16–1	Yu Kimura	TKO	6 (8)	15 Oct 2011	Korakuen Hall, Tokyo, Japan	
16	Win	15–1	Tetsuya Hisada	UD	6	5 Jul 2011	Korakuen Hall, Tokyo, Japan	
15	Win	14–1	Keiichi Numata	TKO	8 (8)	28 Jan 2011	Korakuen Hall, Tokyo, Japan	
14	Win	13–1	Toshimasa Ouchi	TKO	7 (8)	1 Oct 2010	Korakuen Hall, Tokyo, Japan	
13	Win	12–1	Seiya Hirakawa	TKO	6 (8)	28 Jul 2010	Korakuen Hall, Tokyo, Japan	
12	Win	11–1	Sho Nakazawa	UD	8	11 Apr 2010	IMP Hall, Osaka, Japan	
11	Win	10–1	Norihito Tanaka	DQ	2 (6)	28 Dec 2009	Korakuen Hall, Tokyo, Japan	
10	Loss	9–1	Masayoshi Segawa	UD	8	1 Aug 2009	Korakuen Hall, Tokyo, Japan	
9	Win	9–0	Pattana Tadniyom	KO	2 (6)	7 Feb 2009	Korakuen Hall, Tokyo, Japan	
8	Win	8–0	Shintaro Sue	UD	6	27 Mar 2008	Korakuen Hall, Tokyo, Japan	
7	Win	7–0	Sho Nakazawa	UD	5	22 Dec 2007	Korakuen Hall, Tokyo, Japan	
6	Win	6–0	Masayoshi Takashima	UD	4	4 Nov 2007	Korakuen Hall, Tokyo, Japan	
5	Win	5–0	Kazuki Oshiro	UD	4	27 Sep 2007	Korakuen Hall, Tokyo, Japan	
4	Win	4–0	Taisei Hirano	UD	4	6 Jun 2007	Korakuen Hall, Tokyo, Japan	
3	Win	3–0	Ryu Onigashima	UD	4	11 Dec 2006	Korakuen Hall, Tokyo, Japan	
2	Win	2–0	Akihiro Konya	TKO	3 (4)	27 Sep 2006	Korakuen Hall, Tokyo, Japan	
1	Win	1–0	Tomohiro Seo	TKO	1 (4)	19 Jul 2006	Korakuen Hall, Tokyo, Japan	

== See also ==
- List of light-flyweight boxing champions
- List of Japanese boxing world champions
- Boxing in Japan

Sporting positions
Regional boxing titles
Vacant Title last held by Masayuki Kuroda	Japanese light-flyweight champion 3 April 2013 – 25 August 2013	Succeeded by Naoya Inoue
World boxing titles
Preceded by Alberto Rossel	WBA light-flyweight champion 31 December 2014 – 31 December 2017; Promoted	Vacant Title next held by Carlos Cañizales as Regular Champion
Vacant Title last held by Román González	WBA light-flyweight champion Unified Title; 31 December 2017 – 20 May 2018	Succeeded by Hekkie Budler
Preceded by Milan Melindo	IBF light-flyweight champion 31 December 2017 – 20 May 2018	Succeeded by Hekkie Budler
Vacant Title last held by Donnie Nietes	The Ring light-flyweight champion 31 December 2017 – 20 May 2018	Succeeded by Hekkie Budler
