= Carlos Licona =

American boxer

Personal information
- Nickname: Mexicanito
- Nationality: American
- Born: Carlos Rogelio Licona; March 3, 1995 (age 31) Mexico City, Mexico
- Height: 5 ft 4 in (163 cm)
- Weight: Mini flyweight; Flyweight

Boxing career
- Reach: 68 in (173 cm)
- Stance: Orthodox

Boxing record
- Total fights: 16
- Wins: 15
- Win by KO: 2
- Losses: 1

Carlos Rogelio Licona (born March 3, 1995) is a Mexican-born American professional boxer who held the IBF mini flyweight title from 2018 to 2019.

== Professional career ==
Licona turned professional on 5 December 2014 with a first-round knockout of Armando Diaz and amassed a 13–0 record during the next four years. His undefeated streak earned him the fight to face fellow unbeaten contender Mark Anthony Barriga for the vacant IBF mini flyweight title. The title bout was booked to face place on 1 December 2018, at the Staples Center in Los Angeles, California, on the Deontay Wilder vs. Tyson Fury undercard. Licona won the fight by split decision. Two judges scored the bout 115–113 in his favor, while the third judge awarded an identical scorecard to Barriga.

Licona made his first IBF mini-flyweight title defense against the once-defeated Deejay Kriel on 16 February 2019, at the Microsoft Theater in Los Angeles, California. He lost the fight by a late twelfth-round knockout. Licona was up 108–101 on two of the judges' scorecards at the time of the stoppage. Licona faced Nohel Arambulet for the vacant WBC FECARBOX flyweight title on 26 July 2019, in his first fight post-title loss. He won the fight by unanimous decision, with scores of 117–111, 117–111 and 116–112.

== Professional boxing record ==
16 fights	15 wins	1 loss
By knockout	2	1
By decision	13	0

No.	Result	Record	Opponent	Type	Round, time	Date	Location	Notes
16	Win	15–1	Nohel Arambulet	UD	12	26 Jul 2019	Domo del Parque San Rafael, Guadalajara, Mexico	Won vacant WBC FECARBOX flyweight title
15	Loss	14–1	Deejay Kriel	KO	12 (12), 2:16	16 Feb 2019	Microsoft Theater, Los Angeles, California, U.S.	Lost IBF mini flyweight title
14	Win	14–0	Mark Anthony Barriga	SD	12	1 Dec 2018	Staples Center, Los Angeles, California, U.S.	Won vacant IBF mini flyweight title
13	Win	13–0	Jose Eduardo Ramirez	SD	8	29 Jun 2018	Grand Oasis Arena, Cancún, Mexico	
12	Win	12–0	Janiel Rivera	UD	10	7 Apr 2018	Complejo Ferial, Ponce, Puerto Rico	Won vacant WBO Latino mini flyweight title
11	Win	11–0	Efrain Gonzalez	UD	6	27 Jan 2018	Auditorio Fausto Gutierrez Moreno, Tijuana, Mexico	
10	Win	10–0	Juan Carlos Diego	MD	6	4 Nov 2017	Estadio Gasmart, Tijuana, Mexico	
9	Win	9–0	Cesar Sustaita	TD	4 (6)	16 Feb 2017	The Hangar, Costa Mesa, California, U.S.	
8	Win	8–0	Yezber Romero	UD	6	8 Dec 2016	Orange County Fair, Costa Mesa, California, U.S.	
7	Win	7–0	Cesar Sustaita	UD	6	14 May 2016	Sportsmans Lodge, Studio City, California, U.S.	
6	Win	6–0	Pedro Verdin	UD	4	20 Feb 2016	Gimnasio De Los Algodones, Mexicali, Mexico	
5	Win	5–0	Francisco Mendivil	MD	6	23 Jan 2016	Billar El Perro Salado, Tijuana, Mexico	
4	Win	4–0	Alejandro Galindo	KO	1 (4), 2:01	19 Nov 2015	Rancho Grande Bar, Tijuana, Mexico	
3	Win	3–0	Jose Alfredo Flores	UD	4	31 Oct 2015	Auditorio Fausto Gutierrez Moreno, Tijuana, Mexico	
2	Win	2–0	Alvaro Diaz	UD	4	30 May 2015	Carnitas Tepatitlan, Tijuana, Mexico	
1	Win	1–0	Armando Diaz	KO	1 (4), 1:16	5 Dec 2014	El Cobertiso, Concordia, Mexico	

== See also ==
- List of mini-flyweight boxing champions
- List of Mexican boxing world champions

Sporting positions
World boxing titles
Vacant Title last held by Hiroto Kyoguchi	IBF mini flyweight champion 1 December 2018 – 16 February 2019	Succeeded by Deejay Kriel
