= Mark Anthony Barriga =

Filipino boxer (born 1993)

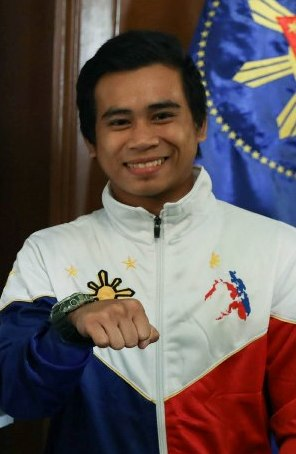

Personal information
- Nationality: Filipino
- Born: June 11, 1993 (age 33) Danao, Cebu, Philippines
- Height: 5 ft 2 in (157 cm)
- Weight: 106 lb (48 kg)

Boxing career
- Weight class: Mini-flyweight
- Stance: Southpaw

Boxing record
- Total fights: 13
- Wins: 11
- Win by KO: 2
- Losses: 2
Medal record
Men's amateur boxing
Representing Philippines
Asian Games
Bronze medal – third place	2014 Incheon	Light flyweight
Southeast Games
Gold medal – first place	2013 Naypyidaw	Light flyweight

Mark Anthony Barriga (born June 11, 1993) is a Filipino professional boxer who challenged for the IBF mini-flyweight title in 2018. As an amateur, Barriga represented Philippines at the 2012 Olympics, reaching the round of 16 of the light-flyweight bracket.

== Personal life ==
Barriga was born in Danao, Cebu but grew up in Panabo, Davao del Norte. Mark Anthony was born to Edgar and Melita Barriga, the former a printing machine operator for a Korean company in their hometown. Barriga took up boxing at the age of 10, encouraged by his father. He studied business at the UM Panabo College and plays guitar as a hobby.

== Amateur career ==
Barriga's participation at the 2012 London Olympics ended after he lost to Kazakh boxer Birzhan Zhakypov, 16–17, in their August 4 round-of-16 match. Barriga was slapped with a one-point deduction in the middle of the fight's third and final round, enabling Zhakypov to eke out a one-point win despite trailing by two (8–10) after the second round.

=== 2011 World Amateur results ===
- Defeated Stefan Caslarov (Romania) 12–5
- Defeated Paddy Barnes (Ireland) 20–12
- Lost to Zou Shiming (China) 5–12

=== 2012 Olympic results ===
- Defeated Manuel Cappai (Italy) 17–7
- Lost to Birzhan Zhakypov (Kazakhstan) 16–17

=== 2013 Southeast Asian Games ===
- Defeated Huynu Ngoc Tan (Vietnam) 2–1
- Defeated Mohd Fuad Mohd Reuvan (Malaysia) 2–1
- Defeated Konelis Kwangu Langu (Indonesia) 3–0

=== World Series of Boxing ===
2013–2014 Season boxing fighting for Italia Thunder

- Defeated Leandro Blanc (Argentina) of Argentina Condors (3–0)
- Defeated Ovidiu Berceanu (Romania) of Team Germany by points (3–0)
- Defeated Lü Bin (China) of USA Knockouts by points (3–0)
- Defeated Ovidiu Berceanu (Romania) of Team Germany by points (3–0)
- Lost to Khamza Nametov (Russia) of Azerbaijan Baku Fires due to TKO-Injury

== Professional career ==
He decided to turn pro after Rogen Ladon qualified for the 2016 Summer Olympics as a flyweight, which was Barriga's weight class. Barriga was set to become a professional boxer on June 18, 2016, against Mark Anthony Florida at the Philippine Navy Gym in Taguig in the mini-flyweight division but this match was later cancelled. Upon turning pro, Barriga signed to manager Jason Soong and was trained by Joven Jimenez.

A new debut match was scheduled and Barriga was pitted against 18-year old Melvin Manangquil in an undercard match in a show organized by Cebu City-based promotion OPSI at the Robinsons Galleria in Cebu in July 2016. Barriga's match with Manangquil was fought in six rounds instead of four which is customary for debuts of novices in the mini-flyweight division. Barriga won by unanimous decision (60–54, 59–55, 59–55) Barriga's third fight was stopped in the fifth round of eight scheduled, after Barriga was cut by an accidental headbutt. He won the fight by technical decision. Barriga got his first stoppage win in his fifth fight, scoring a round 2 technical knockout over Marlou Sandoval. On September 9, 2017, Barriga defeated former world title challenger Samartlek Kokietgym, out boxing him en route to a wide unanimous decision win (100–90, 100–90, 100–90). Barriga won the WBO International mini-flyweight title in this fight. In May 2018, Barriga defeated Gabriel Mendoza, another former world title challenger, by unanimous decision. With the win, Barriga improved his record to nine wins and zero losses and became the IBF's mandatory challenger. This was Barriga's first twelve-round fight.

Barriga called out the IBF mini-flyweight world champion, Hiroto Kyoguchi, but Kyoguchi moved up a weight class to light flyweight shortly thereafter. The IBF ordered a match between Barriga and Carlos Licona for the vacant title. After negotiations stalled for a few months, the fight was agreed for the undercard of Deontay Wilder vs. Tyson Fury.

== Professional boxing record ==
13 fights	11 wins	2 losses
By knockout	2	0
By decision	9	2

No.	Result	Record	Opponent	Type	Round, time	Date	Location	Notes
13	Loss	11–2	Jonathan González	UD	12	June 24, 2022	Osceola Heritage Park, Kissimmee, Florida, U.S.	For WBO junior-flyweight title
12	Win	11–1	Ramel Antaran	UD	8	October 29, 2021	Sanman Gym, General Santos City, Philippines	
11	Win	10–1	Junuel Lacar	RTD	4 (6), 3:00	March 27, 2021	IPI Compound, Mandaue, Philippines	
10	Loss	9–1	Carlos Licona	SD	12	December 1, 2018	Staples Center, Los Angeles, California, U.S.	For vacant IBF mini-flyweight title
9	Win	9–0	Gabriel Mendoza	UD	12	May 13, 2018	SM City North EDSA, Quezon City, Philippines	
8	Win	8–0	Glenne Calacar	UD	10	December 16, 2017	Cinema Square Boxing Arena, Makati, Philippines	
7	Win	7–0	Samartlek Kokietgym	UD	10	September 29, 2017	Heyuan Royal Garden Hotel, Beijing, China	Won vacant WBO International mini-flyweight title
6	Win	6–0	Joel Taduran	UD	10	July 22, 2017	Sports Complex, Sablayan, Philippines	
5	Win	5–0	Marlou Sandoval	TKO	2 (10), 2:03	June 4, 2017	Zamboanga del Norte Cultural Center, Dipolog, Philippines	
4	Win	4–0	Geboi Mansalayao	UD	8	February 18, 2017	Cinema Square Boxing Arena, Makati, Philippines	
3	Win	3–0	Rodel Kirk Pelenio	TD	5 (8), 1:25	December 2, 2016	City Sports and Cultural Complex, Mandaue, Philippines	TD after Barriaga cut from accidental head clash
2	Win	2–0	Powell Balaba	UD	8	September 30, 2016	Strike Coliseum, Bacoor, Philippines	
1	Win	1–0	Melvin Manangquil	UD	6	July 30, 2016	Robinsons Galleria, Cebu City, Philippines	

Sporting positions
Regional boxing titles
Inaugural champion	WBO International mini-flyweight champion September 29, 2017 – November 2017	Vacant Title next held by Jing Xiang
