= Akira Yaegashi =

Japanese boxer (born 1983)

Personal information
- Nickname: Sonic Fist
- Born: 八重樫東; February 25, 1983 (age 43) Kitakami, Iwate, Japan
- Height: 5 ft 3 in (160 cm)
- Weight: Mini-flyweight; Light-flyweight; Flyweight

Boxing career
- Reach: 65 in (165 cm)
- Stance: Orthodox

Boxing record
- Total fights: 35
- Wins: 28
- Win by KO: 16
- Losses: 7

Akira Yaegashi (八重樫 東, Yaegashi Akira; born February 25, 1983) is a Japanese former professional boxer who competed from 2005 to 2019. He is a three-weight world champion, having held the World Boxing Association (WBA) mini-flyweight title from 2011 to 2012, the World Boxing Council (WBC) and Ring magazine flyweight titles from 2013 to 2014, and the International Boxing Federation (IBF) light-flyweight title from 2015 to 2016. He is an alumnus of the Takushoku University.

== Professional career ==
Yaegashi finished his amateur career with a record of 56–14 after winning the Inter-High School Championship and the National Sports Festival of Japan. His professional debut was at the Yokohama Cultural Gymnasium in March 2005. He won the vacant OPBF mini-flyweight title there via a fifth-round technical knockout in April 2006 and defended the title once before vacating it.

In his first world title shot against the WBC mini-flyweight champion Eagle Kyowa at the Pacifico Yokohama in June 2007, Yaegashi lost for the first time by a wide points margin after suffering a broken TMJ in two places due to an accidental headbutt in the second round.

After a nearly eleven-month absence from the ring, Yaegashi restarted his career, but lost in the semi-final match of the annual Japanese title elimination tournament nicknamed "The Strongest in Korakuen" at the Korakuen Hall in Tokyo in July 2008. It was in June 2009 that Yaegashi won the vacant Japanese mini-flyweight title at the IMP Hall in Osaka. He defended the title three times before returning it.

Yaegashi won the WBA mini-flyweight title in his second world title shot against Thai's Pornsawan Porpramook via a tenth-round technical knockout at the Korakuen Hall on October 24, 2011. It was a very tough fight. Before the final round began, Yaegashi's manager Hideyuki Ohashi said to him "Come back for your son". The fight earned accolades from international media, winning Fight of the Year honors from ESPN.com and BoxingScene.com, as well as the WBA's award for Most Dramatic Fight of 2011.

On June 20, 2012, in a match that marked the first time two Japanese fighters had met to unify world titles, he lost to the WBC champion Kazuto Ioka via a unanimous decision at the Bodymaker Colosseum. When asked whether the result would have been different unless he got swollen eyes, Yaegashi said "We should not think about it. There is no if's in boxing". The day after the fight, Ioka decided to move up a weight division. So, Yaegashi's team hope the rematch with Ioka in a higher division as their second unification bout. First, Yaegashi aims to win a world championship again.

Yaegashi returned to the ring in a light-flyweight bout at the Korakuen Hall on January 5, 2013, to knock out Saenmuangloei Kokietgym in the ninth round.

Yaegashi became a two-weight class champion when he defeated defending WBC and The Ring flyweight champion, Toshiyuki Igarashi in a unanimous decision on April 8, 2013, in Tokyo, Japan. On 12 August 2013, Yaegashi successfully defended his title by defeating Mexican fighter Oscar Blanquet. Yaegashi floored Blanquet in the 8th round on his way to a points victory.

Yaegashi became a three-weight world champion after defeating IBF light-flyweight champion Javier Mendoza via unanimous decision.

== Professional boxing record ==
35 fights	28 wins	7 losses
By knockout	16	4
By decision	12	3

No.	Result	Record	Opponent	Type	Round, time	Date	Location	Notes
35	Loss	28–7	Moruti Mthalane	TKO	9 (12), 2:54	Dec 23, 2019	Yokohama Arena, Yokohama, Japan	For IBF flyweight title
34	Win	28–6	Sahaphap Bunop	TKO	2 (10), 2:25	Apr 8, 2019	Korakuen Hall, Tokyo, Japan	
33	Win	27–6	Hirofumi Mukai	TKO	7 (10), 2:55	Aug 17, 2018	Korakuen Hall, Tokyo, Japan	
32	Win	26–6	Frans Damur Palue	TKO	2 (10), 2:24	Mar 26, 2018	Korakuen Hall, Tokyo, Japan	
31	Loss	25–6	Milan Melindo	TKO	1 (12), 2:45	May 21, 2017	Ariake Coliseum, Tokyo, Japan	Lost IBF light-flyweight title
30	Win	25–5	Wittawas Basapean	TKO	12 (12), 2:13	Dec 30, 2016	Ariake Coliseum, Tokyo, Japan	Retained IBF light-flyweight title
29	Win	24–5	Martin Tecuapetla	SD	12	May 8, 2016	Ariake Coliseum, Tokyo, Japan	Retained IBF light-flyweight title
28	Win	23–5	Javier Mendoza	UD	12	Dec 29, 2015	Ariake Coliseum, Tokyo, Japan	Won IBF light-flyweight title
27	Win	22–5	Said Fahdafi	KO	3 (10), 1:10	Aug 20, 2015	Korakuen Hall, Tokyo, Japan	
26	Win	21–5	Songseanglek Phosuwangym	TKO	2 (8), 2:05	May 1, 2015	Ota-City General Gymnasium, Tokyo, Japan	
25	Loss	20–5	Pedro Guevara	KO	7 (12), 2:45	Dec 30, 2014	Metropolitan Gym, Tokyo, Japan	For vacant WBC light-flyweight title
24	Loss	20–4	Román González	TKO	9 (12), 2:24	Sep 5, 2014	Yoyogi #2 Gymnasium, Tokyo, Japan	Lost WBC and The Ring flyweight titles
23	Win	20–3	Odilon Zaleta	KO	9 (12), 2:14	Apr 6, 2014	Ota-City General Gymnasium, Tokyo, Japan	Retained WBC and The Ring flyweight titles
22	Win	19–3	Édgar Sosa	UD	12	Dec 6, 2013	Ryōgoku Kokugikan, Tokyo, Japan	Retained WBC and The Ring flyweight titles
21	Win	18–3	Oscar Blanquet	UD	12	Aug 12, 2013	Ota-City General Gymnasium, Tokyo, Japan	Retained WBC and The Ring flyweight titles
20	Win	17–3	Toshiyuki Igarashi	UD	12	Apr 8, 2013	Ryōgoku Kokugikan, Tokyo, Japan	Won WBC and The Ring flyweight titles
19	Win	16–3	Saenmuangloei Kokietgym	KO	9 (10), 2:52	Jan 5, 2013	Korakuen Hall, Tokyo, Japan	
18	Loss	15–3	Kazuto Ioka	UD	12	Jun 20, 2012	Bodymaker Colosseum, Osaka, Japan	Lost WBA mini-flyweight title; For WBC mini-flyweight title
17	Win	15–2	Pornsawan Porpramook	TKO	10 (12), 2:38	Oct 24, 2011	Korakuen Hall, Tokyo, Japan	Won WBA mini-flyweight title
16	Win	14–2	Norihito Tanaka	UD	10	Apr 2, 2011	Korakuen Hall, Tokyo, Japan	Retained Japanese mini-flyweight title
15	Win	13–2	Kosuke Takeichi	UD	10	May 1, 2010	Korakuen Hall, Tokyo, Japan	Retained Japanese mini-flyweight title
14	Win	12–2	Junichiro Kaneda	UD	10	Sep 5, 2009	Korakuen Hall, Tokyo, Japan	Retained Japanese mini-flyweight title
13	Win	11–2	Kenichi Horikawa	UD	10	Jun 21, 2009	IMP Hall, Osaka, Japan	Won vacant Japanese mini-flyweight title
12	Win	10–2	Srisaket Sor Rungvisai	TKO	3 (8), 2:11	Mar 17, 2009	Korakuen Hall, Tokyo, Japan	
11	Win	9–2	Takumi Suda	UD	8	Oct 18, 2008	Korakuen Hall, Tokyo, Japan	
10	Win	8–2	Thongthailek Sor Tanapinyo	TKO	2 (8), 2:35	Sep 15, 2008	Pacifico, Yokohama, Japan	
8	Loss	7–2	Masatate Tsuji	MD	6	Jul 1, 2008	Korakuen Hall, Tokyo, Japan	
8	Win	7–1	Yasuhiro Hisada	UD	10	Apr 30, 2008	Korakuen Hall, Tokyo, Japan	
7	Loss	6–1	Eagle Den Junlaphan	UD	12	Jun 4, 2007	Pacifico, Yokohama, Japan	For WBC mini-flyweight title
6	Win	6–0	Liempetch Sor Veerapol	KO	1 (12), 2:55	Sep 18, 2006	Pacifico, Yokohama, Japan	Retained WBC-OPBF mini-flyweight title
5	Win	5–0	Weerasak Chuwatana	KO	5 (12), 2:19	Apr 3, 2006	Bunka Gym, Yokohama, Japan	Won vacant WBC-OPBF mini-flyweight title
4	Win	4–0	Elmer Gejon	UD	10	Dec 5, 2005	Bunka Gym, Yokohama, Japan	
3	Win	3–0	Danchai Sithsaithong	KO	2 (8), 1:38	Aug 22, 2005	Korakuen Hall, Tokyo, Japan	
2	Win	2–0	Poonsawat Eausampan	KO	1 (8), 2:50	May 18, 2005	Korakuen Hall, Tokyo, Japan	
1	Win	1–0	Omoyoshi Nakayama	KO	1 (6), 1:20	Mar 26, 2005	Bunka Gym, Yokohama, Japan	

== Titles in boxing ==
=== Major world titles ===
- WBA mini-flyweight champion (105 lbs)
- IBF light-flyweight champion (108 lbs)
- WBC flyweight champion (112 lbs)

=== The Ring magazine titles ===
- The Ring flyweight champion (112 lbs)

=== Regional/International titles ===
- WBC-OPBF mini-flyweight champion (105 lbs)
- Japanese mini-flyweight champion (105 lbs)

== Exhibition boxing record ==
4 fights	0 wins	0 losses
Non-scored	4	

No.	Result	Record	Opponent	Type	Round, time	Date	Location	Notes
4	—N/a	0–0 (4)	Taku Kuwahara	—N/a	2	28 Nov 2020	Korakuen Hall, Tokyo, Japan	Non-scored bout
3	—N/a	0–0 (3)	Katsuki Mori	—N/a	2	1 Jul 2019	Korakuen Hall, Tokyo, Japan	Non-scored bout
2	—N/a	0–0 (2)	Naoya Inoue	—N/a	2	19 May 2014	Korakuen Hall, Tokyo, Japan	Non-scored bout
1	—N/a	0–0 (1)	Naoya Inoue	—N/a	2	21 Oct 2013	Korakuen Hall, Tokyo, Japan	Non-scored bout

== Titles in boxing ==
=== Major world titles ===
- WBA mini-flyweight champion (105 lbs)
- IBF light-flyweight champion (108 lbs)
- WBC flyweight champion (112 lbs)

=== The Ring magazine titles ===
- The Ring flyweight champion (112 lbs)

=== Regional/International titles ===
- OPBF mini-flyweight champion (105 lbs)
- Japanese mini-flyweight champion (105 lbs)

== Recognitions ==
- 2011 ESPN.com Fight of the Year
- 2011 BoxingScene.com Fight of the Year
- 2011 WBA Most Dramatic Fight

== See also ==
- List of Mini-flyweight boxing champions
- List of light-flyweight boxing champions
- List of flyweight boxing champions
- List of boxing triple champions
- List of Japanese boxing world champions
- Boxing in Japan

Sporting positions
World boxing titles
Preceded by Pornsawan Porpramook	WBA mini-flyweight champion October 24, 2011 – June 20, 2012	Succeeded by Kazuto Ioka
Preceded by Toshiyuki Igarashi	WBC flyweight champion April 8, 2013 – September 5, 2014	Succeeded by Román González
Preceded by Toshiyuki Igarashi	The Ring flyweight champion April 8, 2013 – September 5, 2014	Succeeded by Román González
Preceded by Javier Mendoza	IBF light-flyweight champion December 29, 2015 – May 21, 2017	Succeeded by Milan Melindo
