= Deejay Kriel =

South African boxer (born 1995)

Personal information
- Nationality: South African
- Born: 20 June 1995 (age 31) Johannesburg, South Africa
- Height: 5 ft 3 in (160 cm)
- Weight: Mini-flyweight; Light-flyweight

Boxing career
- Stance: Orthodox

Boxing record
- Total fights: 21
- Wins: 18
- Win by KO: 8
- Losses: 2
- Draws: 1

Deejay Kriel (born 20 June 1995) is a South African professional boxer who held the IBF mini-flyweight title in 2019.

== Professional career ==
=== Early career ===
Kriel made his professional debut against Colin Tloubatla on 10 April 2014. He lost the fight on points. Kriel rebounded from this loss by amassing a 11-1-1 record, before fighting Dexter Alimento for the vacant WBC International mini-flyweight title on 23 July 2017. He won the fight by unanimous decision. He fought twice more before he challenged for a world title, with one of this fights being a WBC International title defense.

=== IBF mini flyweight champion ===
Kriel was scheduled to challenge the reigning IBF mini-flyweight champion Carlos Licona on 16 February 2019 at the Microsoft Theater in Los Angeles, California, United States. It was his first fight outside of South Africa. He came into the fight as an underdog. Despite this, Kriel won the fight by a late twelfth-round knockout. Coming into the last round, Kriel was down on two of the judges scorecards who had Licona up 108-101, while the third judge had Kriel at 105-104. Kriel managed to knock his opponent out with a left hook, with just 44 seconds left in the bout. During the post-fight interview, Kriel stated his desire to fight the WBC strawweight champion Wanheng Menayothin in a title unification fight.

Kriel was scheduled to face Jesus Fernando Aguirre in a non-title bout on 30 November 2019. He made quick work of his opponent, knocking Aguirre out in the first round. Kriel was afterwards ordered by the IBF to defend his title for a purse of $16 250. Unsatisfied with this, he opted to vacate the IBF title and move up to junior flyweight.

=== Move to light flyweight ===
Kriel was scheduled to challenge the reigning IBF junior-flyweight champion Felix Alvarado, in the latter's second title defense, on 2 January 2021 at the American Airlines Center in Dallas, Texas. Alvardo knocked Kriel down in both the second and fourth rounds, before finishing him by technical knockout in the tenth round.

Kriel faced Thembelani Nxoshe on 9 December 2022, following a 23-month long absence from the sport. He won the fight by majority decision, with scores of 78–74, 77–75 and 76–76.

== Professional boxing record ==
21 fights	18 wins	2 losses
By knockout	8	1
By decision	10	1
Draws	1	

No.	Result	Record	Opponent	Type	Round, time	Date	Location	Notes
21	Win	18–2–1	Jafet Amukwa	UD	10	15 Jul 2023	Booysens Boxing Club, Johannesburg, South Africa	
20	Win	17–2–1	Thembelani Nxoshe	MD	8	9 Dec 2022	The Gallery, Johannesburg, South Africa	
19	Loss	16–2–1	Felix Alvarado	TKO	10 (12), 1:39	2 Jan 2021	American Airlines Center, Dallas, Texas, U.S.	For IBF junior-flyweight title
18	Win	16–1–1	Jesus Fernando Aguirre	KO	1 (4), 1:54	30 Nov 2019	Big Punch Arena, Tijuana, Mexico	
17	Win	15–1–1	Carlos Licona	KO	12 (12), 2:16	16 Feb 2019	Microsoft Theater, Los Angeles, California, US	Won IBF mini-flyweight title
16	Win	14–1–1	Xolisa Magusha	UD	12	3 Mar 2018	Emperors Palace, Kempton Park, South Africa	Retained WBC International mini-flyweight title
15	Win	13–1–1	Thembelani Okolo	MD	8	21 Oct 2017	Emperors Palace, Kempton Park, South Africa	
14	Win	12–1–1	Dexter Alimento	UD	12	23 Jul 2017	Emperors Palace, Kempton Park, South Africa	Won vacant WBC International mini-flyweight title
13	Win	11–1–1	Xolisa Magusha	UD	8	23 Apr 2017	Emperors Palace, Kempton Park, South Africa	
12	Win	10–1–1	Nyelisani Thagambega	TKO	5 (10)	22 Oct 2016	Emperors Palace, Kempton Park, South Africa	
11	Win	9–1–1	Nyelisani Thagambega	TKO	7 (8), 2:31	24 Jul 2016	Emperors Palace, Kempton Park, South Africa	
10	Draw	8–1–1	Ayanda Ndulani	SD	6	24 Apr 2016	Emperors Palace, Kempton Park, South Africa	
9	Win	8–1	Morabedi Khotle	UD	6	7 Feb 2016	Emperors Palace, Kempton Park, South Africa	
8	Win	7–1	Thabo Moabi	TKO	3 (6)	1 Dec 2015	Emperors Palace, Kempton Park, South Africa	
7	Win	6–1	Edward Disloane	PTS	4	4 Oct 2015	Emperors Palace, Kempton Park, South Africa	
6	Win	5–1	Thabo Moabi	TKO	5 (6)	30 Jul 2015	Emperors Palace, Kempton Park, South Africa	
5	Win	4–1	Clever Mdingi	TKO	3 (4)	13 Apr 2015	Emperors Palace, Kempton Park, South Africa	
4	Win	3–1	Donald Khetsane	TKO	3 (4)	3 Dec 2014	Emperors Palace, Kempton Park, South Africa	
3	Win	2–1	Clever Mdingi	PTS	4	28 Aug 2014	Presleys Restaurant, Boksburg, South Africa	
2	Win	1–1	Colin Tloubatla	PTS	4	26 Jun 2014	Presleys Restaurant, Boksburg, South Africa	
1	Loss	0–1	Colin Tloubatla	PTS	4	10 Apr 2014	Gold Reef Entertainment Centre, Johannesburg, South Africa	

== See also ==
- List of mini-flyweight boxing champions

Sporting positions
World boxing titles
Preceded by Carlos Licona	IBF mini-flyweight champion 16 February 2019 – 4 July 2019; Vacated	Vacant Title next held by Pedro Taduran
