= Kwanthai Sithmorseng =

Thai boxer

- Born: Ekavit Songnui (เอกวิทย์ สงนุ้ย); August 18, 1984 (age 42); Palian district, Trang province
- Native name: ขวัญไทย ศิษย์หมอเส็ง
- Other names: Kwanthai Chor Nor Pattalung (ขวัญไทย ช. ณ พัทลุง)
- Nationality: Thailand
- Height: 160 cm (5 ft 3 in)
- Division: Minimumweight
- Stance: Orthodox
- Years active: 2005–present

Professional boxing record
- Total: 59
- Wins: 50
- By knockout: 27
- Losses: 8
- By knockout: 7
- Draws: 1

Other information
- Boxing record from BoxRec

Kwanthai Sithmorseng (Thai: ขวัญไทย ศิษย์หมอเส็ง, born August 18, 1984) is a professional boxer from Thailand. He fights in the strawweight division and is the former WBA Minimumweight World champion. He captured the title on November 5, 2010 by defeating fellow Thai Wicha Phulaikhao aka Pigmy Kokietgym and lost it on April 19, 2011 to Muhammad Rachman by KO.

== Early life ==
He was born without ever knowing who his parents were. He entered the world of boxing by first going to watch a Muay Thai match and ended up following a group of fighters back to their camp. When the camp owner saw him, he decided to take him in and raise him. That was how he began his boxing career, starting with Muay Thai under the name Kwanthai Chor Nor Pattalung.

== Professional boxing record ==
59 fights	50 wins	8 losses
By knockout	27	7
By decision	23	1
Draws	1	

No.	Result	Record	Opponent	Type	Round, time	Date	Location	Notes
59	Loss	50–8–1	Srisaket Sor Rungvisai	RTD	3 (10), 3:00	Mar 13, 2021	Workpoint Studio, Bang Phun, Thailand	
58	Win	50–7–1	Rattakorn Tassaworn	RTD	3 (8)	Dec 30, 2020	Phraputtabat Muaythai Center, Sara Buri, Thailand	Won vacant Thai super flyweight title
57	Loss	49–7–1	Jayson Mama	TKO	3 (10)	Jun 9, 2019	Tv5 Studio, Novaliches, Quezon City, Metro Manila, Philippines	
56	Win	49–6–1	Mongkol Kaokrue	UD	6	May 9, 2019	Bangkok University, Thonburi Campus, Bangkok, Thailand	
55	Loss	48–6–1	Wulan Tuolehazi	TKO	4 (10)	May 5, 2018	Guang An Stadium, Guang An, China	
54	Loss	48–5–1	Masahiro Sakamoto	KO	3 (12)	Dec 3, 2017	EDION Arena Osaka, Osaka, Osaka, Japan	For vacant World Boxing Organisation Asia Pacific flyweight title
53	Win	48–4–1	Petchroi Sor Visetkit	TKO	3 (6)	May 23, 2017	Bangkok University, Thonburi Campus, Bangkok, Thailand	
52	Loss	47–4–1	Ryoichi Taguchi	TKO	8 (12)	May 6, 2015	Ota-City General Gymnasium, Tokyo, Japan	For WBA light flyweight title
51	Win	47–3–1	Ponidi	KO	2 (6)	Feb 6, 2015	Rattanakosin Sompot Lad Krabang School, Bangkok, Thailand	
50	Win	46–3–1	Heri Amol	PTS	6	Dec 23, 2014	Ayutthaya Park, Ayutthaya, Thailand	
49	Win	45–3–1	Saentawee Sor Ponsaming	KO	2 (6)	Oct 3, 2014	Bangkok University, Thonburi Campus, Bangkok, Thailand	
48	Loss	44–3–1	Stamp Kiatniwat	UD	12	Aug 8, 2014	Royal Square, Bangkok, Thailand	Won interim PABA flyweight title
47	Win	44–2–1	Samuel Tehuayo	UD	6	May 1, 2014	Klangwieng, Phayao, Thailand	
46	Win	43–2–1	Demsi	KO	1 (6)	Apr 4, 2014	King Rama 1 Memorial Park, Ratchaburi, Thailand	
45	Win	42–2–1	Safwan Lombok	TKO	4 (6)	Jan 17, 2014	Wat Sing Matayon School, Bangkok, Thailand	
44	Loss	41–2–1	Kazuto Ioka	KO	7 (12)	Sep 11, 2013	Bodymaker Colosseum, Osaka, Japan	For WBA light flyweight title
43	Win	41–1–1	Madit Sada	TKO	5 (12)	Jul 5, 2013	Morseng Building, Pathum Thani, Thailand	Retained PABA minimumweight title
42	Win	40–1–1	Luinika Rodolfo	TKO	4 (6)	May 28, 2013	Wat Phrasaeng, Surat Thani, Thailand	
41	Win	39–1–1	Unknown	PTS	6	Apr 18, 2013	Ayutthaya Park, Ayutthaya, Thailand	
40	Win	38–1–1	Samuel Tehuayo	PTS	6	Feb 12, 2013	Chanthaburi, Thailand	
39	Win	37–1–1	Modin Khadaffi	PTS	6	Dec 21, 2012	Bangkok University, Thonburi Campus, Bangkok, Thailand	
38	Win	36–1–1	Ical Tobida	UD	6	Nov 13, 2012	Ayutthaya Park, Ayutthaya, Thailand	
37	Win	35–1–1	Hengky Elleuw	TKO	2 (12)	May 22, 2012	Thon Buri, Thailand	Retained PABA minimumweight title
36	Win	34–1–1	Domi Nenokeba	TKO	5 (12)	Apr 2, 2012	Uttaradit, Thailand	Won vacant PABA minimumweight title
35	Win	33–1–1	Jack Amisa	UD	6	Feb 28, 2012	Na-ngua village, Petchaboon, Thailand	
34	Win	32–1–1	Johan Wahyudi	TKO	3 (6)	Jan 24, 2012	Lop Buri Army Kindergarten, Lop Buri, Thailand	
33	Win	31–1–1	Safwan Lombok	PTS	6	Nov 29, 2011	Pak Kret School, Pak Kret, Thailand	
32	Win	30–1–1	Jack Amisa	PTS	6	Aug 9, 2011	Phophithak, Sapphaya, Chainart, Thailand	
31	Loss	29–1–1	Muhammad Rachman	KO	9 (12)	Apr 19, 2011	Bangkok University, Thonburi Campus, Bangkok, Thailand	Lost WBA minimumweight title
30	Win	29–0–1	Wicha Phulaikhao	SD	12	Nov 5, 2010	Phranakhon Rajabhat University, Bangkok, Thailand	Won vacant WBA minimumweight title
29	Win	28–0–1	Ricky Manufoe	TKO	6 (12)	Jul 13, 2010	Sport Central Park, Rayong, Thailand	Retained PABA minimumweight title
28	Win	27–0–1	Ricky Manufoe	TD	9 (12)	Apr 27, 2010	Bungkayong Stadium, Vientiane, Laos	Retained PABA minimumweight title
27	Win	26–0–1	Decky Putra	KO	4 (12)	Jan 11, 2010	Morseng Building, Pathum Thani, Thailand	
26	Win	25–0–1	Johan Wahyudi	KO	3 (6)	Nov 4, 2009	Ladkarbang, Bangkok, Thailand	
25	Win	24–0–1	Donny Mabao	MD	11	Sep 8, 2009	Wat Kemapirataram School, Nonthaburi, Thailand	Retained PABA minimumweight title
24	Win	23–0–1	Boy Tanto	KO	5 (11)	Jul 21, 2009	Morseng Building, Pathum Thani, Thailand	Retained PABA minimumweight title
23	Win	22–0–1	Yanus Emaury	PTS	6	Jun 19, 2009	Southern Association of Thailand, Bangkok, Thailand	
22	Win	21–0–1	Little Roseman	KO	4 (11)	Apr 30, 2009	Morseng Building, Pathum Thani, Thailand	Retained PABA minimumweight title
21	Win	20–0–1	Agus Situmorang	KO	3 (11)	Feb 4, 2009	Chiengsaen, Chiang Rai, Thailand	Retained PABA minimumweight title
20	Win	19–0–1	Jack Amisa	UD	11	Aug 29, 2008	Morseng Building, Pathum Thani, Thailand	Retained PABA minimumweight title
19	Win	18–0–1	Zhang Yuan Boau	TKO	1 (11)	Apr 29, 2008	Chiang Mai, Thailand	Retained PABA minimumweight title
18	Win	17–0–1	Mating Kilakil	UD	11	Feb 19, 2008	Hua Mark Indoor Stadium, Bangkok, Thailand	Retained PABA minimumweight title
17	Win	16–0–1	Sofyan Effendi	UD	12	Dec 28, 2007	Chamuang Restaurant, Wacharapol, Bangkok, Thailand	Retained PABA minimumweight title
16	Win	15–0–1	Adisak Polkratok	KO	2 (12)	Nov 1, 2007	Patong Beach, Patong, Thailand	Won vacant PABA minimumweight title
15	Win	14–0–1	Santi Siththongjan	KO	2 (6)	Jul 18, 2007	Rajadamnern Stadium, Bangkok, Thailand	
14	Win	13–0–1	Pieter Nesi	PTS	6	Apr 30, 2007	Banbung, Chonburi, Thailand	
13	Win	12–0–1	Michael Rodriguez	KO	2 (6)	Feb 27, 2007	Ratchaburi, Thailand	
12	Win	11–0–1	Ryan Bito	UD	6	Oct 23, 2006	K5, Ban Rom Klao, Thailand	
11	Win	10–0–1	Michael Collondo	PTS	6	Sep 8, 2006	Bangkok, Thailand	
10	Win	9–0–1	Luinika Rodolfo	KO	4 (6)	Jul 31, 2006	Por Kungpao Restaurant, Bangkok, Thailand	
9	Win	8–0–1	Vinai Wor Surapol	PTS	6	Apr 26, 2006	Porkungpao Restaurant, Udomsuk, Bangkok, Thailand	
8	Win	7–0–1	Jadsada Polyiam	PTS	6	Jan 27, 2006	Nakhon Si Thammarat, Thailand	
7	Win	6–0–1	Khamhaeng Phanmee	PTS	6	Dec 22, 2005	Rajadamnern Stadium, Bangkok, Thailand	
6	Win	5–0–1	Kiatisak Kiatisaktanee	KO	3 (6)	Nov 16, 2005	Nakornthon Hospital, Bangkok, Thailand	
5	Win	4–0–1	Ekkalak Suksawat	TKO	3 (6)	Oct 31, 2005	Bangkok, Thailand	
4	Win	3–0–1	Adisak Polkratok	TKO	3 (6)	Sep 21, 2005	Porkungpao Restaurant, Udomsuk, Bangkok, Thailand	
3	Win	2–0–1	Poonsawat Nimitchai	KO	1 (6)	Aug 31, 2005	Rajadamnern Stadium, Bangkok, Thailand	
2	Win	1–0–1	Ongkaraknoi Jittigym	KO	3 (6)	Jul 25, 2005	Mahanakorn University, Bangkok, Thailand	
1	Draw	0–0–1	Nakhon Muensa	PTS	6	Jun 28, 2005	Mahanakorn University, Bangkok, Thailand	

== See also ==
- List of WBA world champions

Vacant Title last held by Román González	WBA Minimumweight Champion; November 5, 2010 – April 19, 2011	Succeeded by Muhammad Rachman
