= Muhammad Rachman =

Indonesian boxer

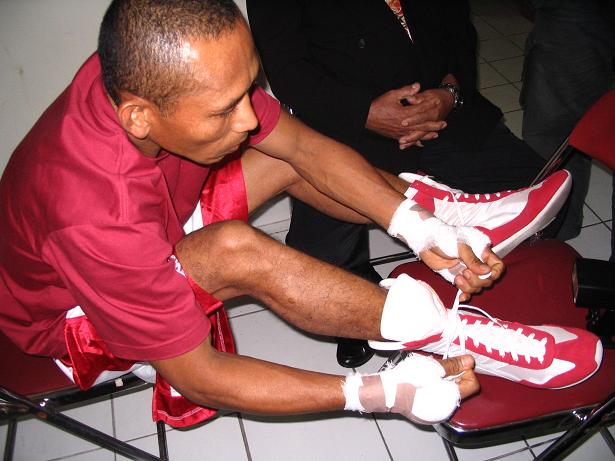

Personal information
- Nicknames: The Rock Breaker; Predator
- Nationality: Indonesian
- Born: Mohamad Rachman Sawaludin bin Suhaimat; 23 December 1971 (age 54) Merauke, Papua (present-day in South Papua), Indonesia
- Height: 5 ft 3 in (1.60 m)
- Weight: Minimumweight; Light-flyweight

Boxing career
- Reach: 59 in (150 cm)
- Stance: Orthodox

Boxing record
- Total fights: 83
- Wins: 65
- Win by KO: 35
- Losses: 13
- Draws: 5

Muhammad Rachman (born 23 December 1971) is an Indonesian professional boxer. An over twenty-year veteran of the sport, he is a two-time minimumweight world champion, having held the IBF title from 2004 to 2007 and the WBA title in 2011.

== Professional career ==
"The Rock Breaker" (Rachman's nickname) won the IBF World Strawweight Championship by a split decision against Daniel Reyes of Colombia (September 14, 2004 in Jakarta). Rachman got his nickname "The Rock Breaker" after defeating Filippino IBF high-rated Ernesto "Hard Rock" Rubillar, in Jakarta, Indonesia, in March 2003.

On July 7, 2007, Rachman lost his title to Filipino boxer Florante Condes. Condes knocked Rachman down twice in the third and 10th rounds during the 12-round title fight held in the studio of the private RCTI television station in Jakarta. Rachman dominated the fight in rounds four, six, seven, eight, and nine. Whereas Condes dominated the fight in rounds one, two, three, five, and ten. Salven Lagumbay of the Philippines and Montol Suriyachand of Thailand, scored it 114-112 for Condes, while home judge Muhammad Rois gave it 117-113 for Rachman.

On 19 April 2011 Rachman knocked out Thai boxer Kwanthai Sithmorseng in the 9th round at Thailand to claim the WBA World Minimumweight title. Rachman was knocked down in the second round but stunned Sithmorseng in the 9th round when he knocked down him with a huge body blow.

On July 30, 2011, Rachman lost the WBA World Minimumweight title to Pornsawan Porpramook in a controversial majority decision, 114-114, 113-115, 114-115.

Rachman is recorded as the fourth Indonesian to win a boxing world title belt, following Ellyas Pical (three-time IBF Jr. Bantamweight Champion, 1985- 1989), Nico Thomas (IBF Strawweight Champion, 1989) and Chris John (WBA Featherweight Champion, 2003-2013).

== Personal life ==
In 2006, Rachman became a law student at Putra Bangsa University, Indonesia.

== Professional boxing record ==
83 fights	65 wins	13 losses
By knockout	35	1
By decision	30	12
Draws	5	

No.	Result	Record	Opponent	Type	Round	Date	Location	Notes
83	Loss	65–13–5	Oscar Raknafa	SD	12	Oct 28, 2016	Balai Sarbini Convention Hall, Jakarta, Indonesia	
82	Loss	65–12–5	Thammanoon Niyomtrong	UD	12	Mar 5, 2015	City Hall Ground, Chonburi, Thailand	For WBA Interim minimumweight title
81	Win	65–11–5	Jadsada Polyiam	TKO	12 (12)	Feb 21, 2014	Waringin Sports Hall, Jayapura, Indonesia	Won vacant IBO International light flyweight title
80	Win	64–11–5	Velasak Samsee	TKO	2 (10)	Jul 6, 2013	Mandala, Merauke City, Indonesia	
79	Loss	63–11–5	Pornsawan Porpramook	MD	12	Jul 30, 2011	Indosiar Studio, Jakarta, Indonesia	Lost WBA minimumweight title
78	Win	63–10–5	Kwanthai Sithmorseng	KO	9 (12), 1:29	Apr 19, 2011	Bangkok University, Thonburi Campus, Bangkok, Thailand	Won WBA minimumweight title
77	Loss	62–10–5	Samartlek Kokietgym	PTS	6	Jan 24, 2011	Bangkantak, Samut Songkhram, Thailand	
76	Loss	62–9–5	Denver Cuello	TKO	9 (12), 1:03	Sep 25, 2010	MSU IIT Gym, Iligan City, Lanao del Norte, Philippines	For WBC International strawweight title
75	Loss	62–8–5	Oleydong Sithsamerchai	TD	11 (12), 2:10	May 29, 2009	Bangla Stadium, Patong, Thailand	For WBC strawweight title
74	Loss	62–7–5	Milan Melindo	UD	10	Mar 14, 2009	Cebu City Waterfront Hotel & Casino, Barangay Lahug, Cebu City, Cebu, Philippines	
73	Win	62–6–5	Edrin Dapudong	UD	10	Jun 28, 2008	Trans 7 Studio, Jakarta, Indonesia	
72	Loss	61–6–5	Florante Condes	SD	12	Jul 7, 2007	RCTI Studio, Jakarta, Indonesia	Lost IBF mini-flyweight title
71	Win	61–5–5	Benjie Sorolla	TKO	7 (12), 2:10	Dec 23, 2006	Bung Kamo Indoor Tennis Std., Senayan, Indonesia	Retained IBF mini-flyweight title
70	Win	60–5–5	Omar Soto	KO	6 (12), 1:04	May 6, 2006	Bung Karno Stadium, Jakarta, Indonesia	Retained IBF mini-flyweight title
69	Draw	59–5–5	Thongchai Utaida	TD	3 (12)	Apr 5, 2005	Britama Arena, Kelapa Gading, Jakarta, Indonesia	Retained IBF mini-flyweight title
68	Win	59–5–4	Daniel Reyes	SD	12	Sep 14, 2004	Britama Arena, Kelapa Gading, Jakarta, Indonesia	Won IBF mini-flyweight title
67	Win	58–5–4	Somyot Joneram	TKO	2 (10)	Mar 23, 2004	RCTI Studio, Jakarta, Indonesia	
66	Win	57–5–4	Noel Tunacao	TKO	2 (12), 0:56	Dec 16, 2003	Markas Kodam Brawijaya, Surabaya, Indonesia	
65	Draw	56–5–4	Abrin Matta	TD	5 (10)	Nov 18, 2003	RCTI Studio, Jakarta, Indonesia	
64	Win	56–5–3	Jun Arlos	UD	10	Jun 24, 2003	RCTI Studio, Jakarta, Indonesia	
63	Win	55–5–3	Steve Demaisip	UD	10	May 15, 2003	Indosiar Studio, Jakarta, Indonesia	
62	Win	54–5–3	Ernesto Rubillar	SD	10	Mar 4, 2003	Studio 4 RCTI, Kebon Jeruk, Indonesia	
61	Win	53–5–3	Patrick Twala	UD	10	Jan 17, 2003	Jakarta, Indonesia	
60	Win	52–5–3	Benjie Sorolla	MD	10	Nov 12, 2002	Jakarta, Indonesia	
59	Win	51–5–3	Justin Golden Boy	TKO	6 (8)	Sep 29, 2002	Kampus Stesia, Surabaya, Indonesia	
58	Win	50–5–3	Mzingisi Lindi	KO	1 (10), 1:37	Aug 27, 2002	Sidoarjo Sports Hall, Sidoarjo, Indonesia	
57	Win	49–5–3	Ittarit Nationaman	KO	3 (10)	Jul 16, 2002	Jakarta, Indonesia	
56	Win	48–5–3	Job Tleru	KO	9 (10)	May 21, 2002	Jakarta, Indonesia	
55	Win	47–5–3	Lindi Memani	UD	12	Mar 12, 2002	Sidoarjo Sports Hall, Sidoarjo, Indonesia	Retained IBF Pan Pacific minimumweight title
54	Win	46–5–3	Bert Batawang	UD	10	Jan 29, 2002	Jakarta, Indonesia	
53	Win	45–5–3	Ut Taprakhon	KO	5 (12)	Aug 28, 2001	Sidoarjo, Indonesia	
52	Win	44–5–3	Pichit Salathaon	TKO	5 (10)	Jul 17, 2001	Jakarta, Indonesia	
51	Win	43–5–3	Jerry Pahayahay	TKO	8 (10)	Jun 12, 2001	Jakarta, Indonesia	
50	Win	42–5–3	Jin Ho Kim	PTS	10	Jun 10, 2001	Jakarta, Indonesia	
49	Win	41–5–3	Khachonsak Pothong	TKO	2 (10)	May 2, 2001	Soldier Hall Marine Corps, Cilandak, Indonesia	
48	Draw	40–5–3	Lito Danggod	TD	3 (12), 3:00	Apr 3, 2001	Jember, Indonesia	Retained IBF Pan Pacific minimumweight title
47	Win	40–5–2	Angky Angkotta	KO	1 (10)	Mar 6, 2001	Jakarta, Indonesia	
46	Win	39–5–2	Roger Mananquil	TKO	8 (12)	Dec 1, 2000	Jakarta, Indonesia	Won vacant IBF Pan Pacific minimumweight title
45	Win	38–5–2	Azadin Anhar	PTS	10	Oct 31, 2000	Bogor, Indonesia	
44	Win	37–5–2	Phanom Lukor	KO	7 (10)	Sep 26, 2000	Bogor, Indonesia	
43	Win	36–5–2	Dumisani Bizani	TKO	2 (10)	Aug 22, 2000	Go Skate Hall, Surabaya, Indonesia	
42	Win	35–5–2	Phumzile Grey	TKO	1	Jul 18, 2000	Jakarta, Indonesia	
41	Win	34–5–2	Nico Thomas	TKO	1 (12)	Jul 4, 2000	Surabaya, Indonesia	
40	Win	33–5–2	Paramklong Plajon	KO	1 (10)	Jun 6, 2000	Jakarta, Indonesia	
39	Win	32–5–2	Roy Saragih	PTS	12	May 2, 2000	Jakarta, Indonesia	
38	Win	31–5–2	Singhadam Sitvisanu	KO	2 (10)	Mar 19, 2000	Jakarta, Indonesia	
37	Win	30–5–2	Paul Roger	PTS	12	Dec 5, 1999	Indonesia	
36	Win	29–5–2	Kalong Sithkanpai	PTS	10	Oct 22, 1999	Indonesia	
35	Win	28–5–2	Dipo Saloko	TKO	4 (12)	Jul 9, 1999	Indosiar Studio, Jakarta, Indonesia	
34	Win	27–5–2	Mohammed Sadik	PTS	12	Apr 5, 1999	Indonesia	
33	Win	26–5–2	Toga Pandiangan	KO	6 (12)	Jan 10, 1999	Indonesia	
32	Win	25–5–2	Mohammed Sadik	PTS	10	Dec 18, 1998	Indonesia	
31	Win	24–5–2	Falazona Fidal	PTS	8	Nov 5, 1998	Indonesia	
30	Loss	23–5–2	Meky Mbatu	PTS	8	Apr 30, 1998	Indonesia	
29	Win	23–4–2	Toga Pandiangan	KO	2	Feb 5, 1998	Indonesia	
28	Win	22–4–2	Domingus Siwalette	TKO	8	Dec 10, 1997	Indonesia	
27	Win	21–4–2	Arifin Alit	TKO	2	Nov 5, 1997	Indonesia	
26	Loss	20–4–2	Julio De la Basez	PTS	12	Sep 14, 1997	Indonesia	
25	Win	20–3–2	Meky Mbatu	KO	4	Jul 5, 1997	Indonesia	
24	Win	19–3–2	Taufix Baty	TKO	4	Dec 16, 1996	Indonesia	
23	Win	18–3–2	Domingus Siwalette	PTS	10	Aug 24, 1996	Indonesia	
22	Win	17–3–2	Bawor Sihombing	PTS	6	Aug 18, 1996	Indonesia	
21	Win	16–3–2	Alflus Andrian	PTS	8	Jul 8, 1996	Indonesia	
20	Draw	15–3–2	Yoddoi Singchatchawal	PTS	6 (10)	May 4, 1996	Provincial Stadium, Nan, Thailand	
19	Loss	15–3–1	Mongkol Charoen	PTS	10	Feb 24, 1996	Municipal Stadium, Chachoengsao, Thailand	
18	Win	15–2–1	Famai Sakkririn	TKO	8	Oct 28, 1995	Indonesia	
17	Win	14–2–1	Jack Siahaya	PTS	10	May 13, 1995	Indonesia	
16	Loss	13–2–1	Faisol Akbar	PTS	12	Apr 27, 1995	Indonesia	
15	Draw	13–1–1	Julio De la Basez	PTS	6	Jan 19, 1995	Indonesia	
14	Loss	13–1	Faisol Akbar	PTS	8	Nov 17, 1994	Indonesia	
13	Win	13–0	Julio De la Basez	PTS	6	Sep 25, 1994	Indonesia	
12	Win	12–0	Budi	KO	2	Aug 15, 1994	Indonesia	
11	Win	11–0	Wonoroya Subandi	PTS	8	Jun 8, 1994	Indonesia	
10	Win	10–0	Ryan Puma	KO	6	Apr 23, 1994	Indonesia	
9	Win	9–0	Tono Balon	KO	3	Mar 1, 1994	Indonesia	
8	Win	8–0	Wonoroya Subandi	PTS	8	Nov 21, 1993	Indonesia	
7	Win	7–0	Roy Bima	KO	6	Nov 8, 1993	Indonesia	
6	Win	6–0	Franso Pani	PTS	8	Oct 20, 1993	Indonesia	
5	Win	5–0	Suwito Ramires	PTS	8	Jul 31, 1993	Indonesia	
4	Win	4–0	Minto Hadi	PTS	8	Jun 5, 1993	Indonesia	
3	Win	3–0	Minto Hadi	PTS	6	Apr 7, 1993	Indonesia	
2	Win	2–0	Bambang	PTS	6	Mar 10, 1993	Indonesia	
1	Win	1–0	Muhammad Daud	PTS	4	Jan 14, 1993	Indonesia	

== See also ==
- List of Mini-flyweight boxing champions

Sporting positions
Regional boxing titles
Vacant Title last held by Julio de la Basez	Indonesia minimumweight champion January 10, 1999 – May 2000; Vacated	Vacant Title next held by Paul Roger
Vacant Title last held by Diro	Indonesia light-flyweight champion July 4, 2000 – September 2000; Vacated	Vacant Title next held by Vicky Tahumil
New title	IBF Pan Pacific minimumweight champion December 1, 2001 – November 2002; Vacated	Vacant Title next held by Mateo Handig
New title	IBO International light-flyweight champion February 21, 2014 – December 2014; Vacated	Vacant
World boxing titles
Preceded by Daniel Reyes	IBF minimumweight champion September 14, 2004 – July 7, 2007	Succeeded by Florante Condes
Preceded by Kwanthai Sithmorseng	WBA minimumweight champion April 19, 2011 – July 30, 2011	Succeeded by Pornsawan Porpramook
