= Felix Alvarado =

Nicaraguan boxer (born 1989)

Personal information
- Nickname: El Gemelo
- Born: Felix Pedro Alvarado Sanchez; 15 February 1989 (age 37) Managua, Nicaragua
- Height: 5 ft 4 in (163 cm)
- Weight: Light flyweight; Flyweight

Boxing career
- Reach: 68 in (173 cm)
- Stance: Orthodox

Boxing record
- Total fights: 47
- Wins: 42
- Win by KO: 35
- Losses: 5

Felix Pedro Alvarado Sanchez (born 15 February 1989) is a Nicaraguan former professional boxer who held the IBF light flyweight title from 2018 to 2022. He previously challenged for the IBF flyweight title in 2022, the WBA (Regular) light flyweight title in 2013, and the WBA (Regular) flyweight title in 2014. As of March 2025, Alvarado is ranked as the world's sixth best active flyweight by The Ring, and seventh by BoxRec and the Transnational Boxing Rankings Board. His twin brother, René Alvarado, is also a professional boxer.

== Professional career ==
=== IBF light flyweight champion ===
==== Alvarado vs. Petalcorin ====
His victory against Teeraphong Utaida earned Alvarado the #1 rank in the IBF light flyweight rankings, which made him the mandatory title challenger to the reigning champion Hekkie Budler. Accordingly, IBF ordered Budler to defend against Alvarado. On 25 July 2018, Budler vacated the title, unsatisfied with the purse bid. Sampson Boxing won the bid with a $25 000 offer, with 75% going to Budler and 25% to Alvarado. On 26 July 2018, IBF ordered its two highest ranking light flyweight contenders Randy Petalcorin and Felix Alvarado to fight for the vacant IBF title. The fight was scheduled for 29 October 2018, at the Midas Hotel and Casino in Pasay, Philippines.

Alvarado won the fight by a seventh-round technical knockout, dropping his opponent three times in just over two minutes. The first knockdown came early on in the round, via body shot. Alvarado increased his already high pace, knocking Pentalcorin twice more, until he elected to stay down for the ten-count.

==== Alvarado vs. Konishi ====
Alvarado was scheduled to make his first title defense against the one-time WBA World Light Fly Title challenger Reiya Konishi on 19 May 2019 at the Portopia Hotel in Kobe, Japan. Alvarado won the fight by unanimous decision, with scores of 118-110, 116-112 and 117-111. Konishi gave Alvarado a competitive fight until the seventh round, after which Alvarado took over the fight. All three judges awarded Alvarado rounds eight through eleven.

==== Alvarado vs. Kriel ====
Alvarado was scheduled to fight the reigning WBC light flyweight champion Kenshiro Teraji in a title unification bout on 23 December 2019. The fight was scheduled for the undercard of the Ryota Murata and Steven Butler WBA World Middleweight title bout. On 19 November 2019, Alvarado withdrew from the bout, as he was unable to train due to a bronchial problem.

Alvarado was next scheduled to make his second title defense against the 2019 IBF mini flyweight titlist Deejay Kriel. The fight was booked for 2 January 2021 at the American Airlines Center in Dallas, Texas, United States. Alvarado scored knockdowns in rounds two and four, before finishing his opponent by technical knockout in the tenth round.

==== Alvarado vs. Vasquez ====
Alvarado was expected to defend his IBF junior flyweight title against Erik Lopez on 14 August 2021, at the Ford Center at The Star in Frisco, Texas, United States. Lopez was later forced to withdraw from the bout, as he was unable to acquire a visa. Alvarado was rescheduled to face Israel Vasquez on the same date and venue in a non-title bout. Alvarado won the fight by a first-round knockout. He needed a little over two minutes to knock Lopez out with a right hook.

Alvardo vacated the IBF light flyweight title on 22 March 2022, in order to move up to flyweight.

=== Move to flyweight ===
Alvarado was booked to face Luis Cerrito Hernandez (10–5–1) in Managua, Nicaragua on 21 May 2022, in his first fight at flyweight. He won the fight by a fourth-round knockout, after knocking Hernandez down in both the second and fourth rounds.

On 8 September 2022, the reigning IBF flyweight champion Sunny Edwards was ordered to enter into negotiations with Alvarado for a mandatory title defense. The championship bout took place on 11 November, in Sheffield, England. Alvarado lost the fight by unanimous decision, with scores of 115–113, 115–113 and 116–112.

On 12 January 2023, the IBF ordered Alvarado to face the sanctioning body's third ranked flyweight contender Cristofer Rosales in a flyweight title eliminator. As they failed to reach an agreement, a purse bid was called and won by Alvarado's MP Promotions and M&R Boxing with a bid of $2,500.

Alvarado challenged IBF flyweight champion Masamichi Yabuki at Aichi Sky Expo in Tokoname, Japan, on 27 December 2025, losing by stoppage in the 12th round.

He announced his retirement from professional boxing in August 2026.

== Professional boxing record ==
47 fights	42 wins	5 losses
By knockout	35	1
By decision	7	4

No.	Result	Record	Opponent	Type	Round, time	Date	Location	Notes
47	Loss	42–5	Masamichi Yabuki	KO	12 (12), 1:59	27 Dec 2025	Aichi Sky Expo, Tokoname, Japan	For IBF flyweight title
46	Win	42–4	Tobias Reyes	MD	12	27 Dec 2024	Gimnasio Alexis Arguello, Managua, Nicaragua	
45	Win	41–4	Francisco Gomez Sanchez	UD	10	13 Jul 2024	Gimnasio Nicarao, Managua, Nicaragua	
44	Win	40–4	José Ramirez Armenta	TKO	5 (10), 0:10	3 Feb 2023	Gimnasio Nicarao, Managua, Nicaragua	
43	Loss	39–4	Ángel Ayala	UD	12	24 Oct 2023	Polyforum Zam Ná, Mérida, Mexico	
42	Win	39–3	Armando Torres	TKO	4 (10), 3:00	10 Jun 2023	Miccosukee Resort & Gaming, Miami, Florida, U.S.	
41	Loss	38–3	Sunny Edwards	UD	12	11 Nov 2022	Sheffield Arena, Sheffield, England	For IBF flyweight title
40	Win	38–2	Luis Cerrito Hernandez	KO	4 (10), 1:18	21 May 2022	Polideportivo Alexis Arguello, Managua, Nicaragua	
39	Win	37–2	Israel Vasquez	KO	1 (10), 2:50	14 Aug 2021	Ford Center at The Star, Frisco, Texas, U.S.	
38	Win	36–2	Deejay Kriel	TKO	10 (12), 1:39	2 Jan 2021	American Airlines Center, Dallas, Texas, U.S.	Retained IBF light flyweight title
37	Win	35–2	Reiya Konishi	UD	12	19 May 2019	Portopia Hotel, Kobe, Japan	Retained IBF light flyweight title
36	Win	34–2	Randy Petalcorin	TKO	7 (12), 2:04	29 Oct 2018	Midas Hotel and Casino, Pasay, Philippines	Won vacant IBF light flyweight title
35	Win	33–2	Ivan Meneses Flores	RTD	3 (8), 3:00	28 Apr 2018	Gimnasio Nicarao, Managua, Nicaragua	
34	Win	32–2	Eliud De los Santos	KO	1 (8), 0:20	23 Mar 2018	Nuevo Gimnasio Nicarao, Managua, Nicaragua	
33	Win	31–2	Sebastian Sanchez	RTD	3 (10), 3:00	26 Jan 2018	Puerto Salvador Allende, Managua, Nicaragua	
32	Win	30–2	Fahlan Sakkreerin Jr.	KO	3 (12), 2:17	14 Oct 2017	Puerto Salvador Allende, Managua, Nicaragua	
31	Win	29–2	Jose Antonio Jimenez	KO	1 (10)	26 May 2017	Gimnasio Rosendo Álvarez, Managua, Nicaragua	Retained WBC Latino light flyweight title
30	Win	28–2	Karluis Diaz	KO	1 (8), 1:18	28 Apr 2017	Puerto Salvador Allende, Managua, Nicaragua	
29	Win	27–2	Luis de la Rosa	KO	1 (10), 1:24	31 Mar 2017	Puerto Salvador Allende, Managua, Nicaragua	Retained WBC Latino light flyweight title
28	Win	26–2	Gabriel Ruiz	TKO	1 (10), 2:19	24 Feb 2017	Puerto Salvador Allende, Managua, Nicaragua	Retained WBC Latino light flyweight title
27	Win	25–2	Roberto Rodriguez	KO	1 (10), 1:00	27 Jan 2017	Puerto Salvador Allende, Managua, Nicaragua	Won vacant WBC Latino light flyweight title
26	Win	24–2	Yader Cardoza	UD	8	16 Dec 2016	Puerto Salvador Allende, Managua, Nicaragua	
25	Win	23–2	Noe Medina	TKO	4 (8), 2:38	19 Feb 2016	Puerto Salvador Allende, Managua, Nicaragua	
24	Win	22–2	Yader Cardoza	TKO	5 (8), 1:50	19 Dec 2015	Puerto Salvador Allende, Managua, Nicaragua	
23	Win	21–2	Guillermo Ortiz	TKO	1 (8), 2:00	28 Aug 2015	Gimnasio Rosendo Álvarez, Managua, Nicaragua	
22	Win	20–2	Alexander Taylor	TKO	2 (8), 1:30	23 May 2015	Gimnasio Alexis Argüello, Managua, Nicaragua	
21	Win	19–2	Jose Aguilar	KO	1 (6), 1:29	26 Sep 2014	Centro de Convenciones Hotel Hex, Managua, Nicaragua	
20	Loss	18–2	Juan Carlos Reveco	UD	12	6 Jun 2014	Villa La Ñata Sporting Club, Benavídez, Argentina	For WBA (Regular) flyweight title
19	Loss	18–1	Kazuto Ioka	UD	12	31 Dec 2013	Prefectural Gymnasium, Osaka, Japan	For WBA (Regular) light flyweight title
18	Win	18–0	Jose Aguilar	KO	3 (6), 1:35	30 Aug 2013	Restaurante Musun 2, Rio Blanco, Costa Rica	
17	Win	17–0	Ramon Pena	TKO	1 (8), 2:50	29 Jun 2013	Camara Ganadera, Liberia, Costa Rica	
16	Win	16–0	Carlos Melo	KO	1 (8), 1:38	27 Apr 2013	Gimnasio Municipal, San Pedro, Costa Rica	
15	Win	15–0	Nerys Espinoza	TKO	3 (10), 1:55	15 Dec 2012	Gimnasio Alexis Argüello, Managua, Nicaragua	
14	Win	14–0	Miguel Alfaro	TKO	1 (6), 2:44	30 Jun 2012	Gimnasio Municipal de Chichigalpa, Chinandega, Nicaragua	
13	Win	13–0	Eliecer Quezada	UD	10	17 Dec 2011	Gimnasio Alexis Argüello, Managua, Nicaragua	Won Nicaraguan light flyweight title
12	Win	12–0	Herald Molina	KO	2 (8), 2:16	26 Nov 2011	Gimnasio Alexis Argüello, Managua, Nicaragua	
11	Win	11–0	Arnoldo Solano	MD	6	18 Jun 2011	Gimnasio Alexis Argüello, Managua, Nicaragua	
10	Win	10–0	Jose Martinez	TKO	1 (6), 1:56	5 Feb 2011	Casino La Perla, León, Nicaragua	
9	Win	9–0	Miguel Tellez	UD	6	6 Nov 2010	Casino La Perla, León, Nicaragua	
8	Win	8–0	Pedro Blandon	TKO	2 (6), 2:50	23 Oct 2010	Gimnasio Alexis Argüello, Managua, Nicaragua	
7	Win	7–0	Juan Munguia	TKO	3 (4), 1:56	25 Sep 2010	Gimnasio Municipal de Chichigalpa, Chinandega, Nicaragua	
6	Win	6–0	Lenin Trana	TKO	3 (4), 1:21	4 Sep 2010	Gimnasio Alexis Argüello, Managua, Nicaragua	
5	Win	5–0	Juan Munguia	TKO	3 (4), 2:40	30 Jul 2010	Gimnasio Alexis Argüello, Managua, Nicaragua	
4	Win	4–0	Melvin Olivares	TKO	1 (4), 1:30	26 Jun 2010	Gimnasio Alexis Argüello, Managua, Nicaragua	
3	Win	3–0	Yader Cardoza	KO	3 (4), 1:17	24 Apr 2010	Cancha de la Alcaldia, Moyogalpa, Nicaragua	
2	Win	2–0	Lester Berrios	TKO	1 (4), 1:14	27 Mar 2010	Gimnasio Humberto Mendez Juarez, Rivas, Nicaragua	
1	Win	1–0	Julio Hernandez	TKO	1 (4), 1:44	12 Mar 2010	Gimnasio Alexis Argüello, Managua, Nicaragua	

== See also ==
- List of world light-flyweight boxing champions

Sporting positions
World boxing titles
Vacant Title last held by Hekkie Budler	IBF light flyweight champion 29 October 2018 – 21 March 2022; Vacated	Vacant Title next held by Sivenathi Nontshinga
