= Coliseo Cerrado =

Sporting arena in Peru

Coordinates: 13°31′35″S 71°57′25″W

- Casa De La Juventud
- Interactive map of Coliseo Cerrado
- Full name: Coliseo Cerrado
- Location: Cusco, Peru
- Owner: Institute of Peru Sport (IPD)
- Operator: Institute of Peru Sport (IPD)
- Capacity: 13,000

Construction
- Opened: 1980

Tenant
- some Peru women's national volleyball team matches

Coliseo Cerrado is an indoor sporting arena located in Cusco, Peru. The capacity of the arena is 13,000 spectators and has hosted some Peru women's national volleyball team matches. It hosts indoor sporting events such as basketball, volleyball, and boxing.
