= Samartlek Kokietgym =

Thai boxer (born 1984)

Wittawas Basapean
Personal information
- Nickname: Samartlek Kokietgym
- Nationality: Thai
- Born: Wittawas Basapean; December 4, 1984 (age 41) Amphoe Saba Yoi, Songkhla Province, Southern Thailand
- Height: 5 ft 1 in (155 cm)
- Weight: Minimumweight, Light Flyweight, Flyweight

Boxing career
- Reach: 63 1/2 in (161 cm)
- Stance: Orthodox

Boxing record
- Total fights: 59
- Wins: 39
- Win by KO: 15
- Losses: 18
- Draws: 2
- No contests: 0

Wittawas Basapean (born December 4, 1984), also better known as Samartlek Kokietgym, is a Thai professional boxer and a ranked Minimumweight boxer. He is a former WBC Asian Boxing Council Minimumweight Champion and current PABA Minimumweight Champion, also Basapean is a former world title challenger who fought Naoya Inoue for the WBC World Light Flyweight Title and Akira Yaegashi for the IBF World Light Flyweight Title. Basapean has also fought a number of notable lower weight division boxers such as Tanawat Phonnaku, Muhammad Rachman, Denver Cuello and Randy Petalcorin.

Basapean fought Filipino boxing Olympian Mark Barriga on October 29, 2017, for the vacant WBO International Minimumweight Title. Basapean lost a one-sided unanimous decision against Barriga in Beijing, China.

== Professional boxing record ==
59 fights	39 wins	18 losses
By knockout	15	3
By decision	24	15
Draws	2	

No.	Result	Record	Opponent	Type	Round, time	Date	Location	Notes
59	Win	39–18–2	(Thailand) Kittipong Jareonroy	RTD	5 (6), 3:00	2023-02-01	Rangsit International Stadium, Rangsit, Thailand	
58	Draw	38–18–2	(Thailand) Jakrawut Majungoen	UD	6	2022-10-12	Rangsit International Stadium, Rangsit, Thailand	
57	Loss	38–18–1	(Thailand) Yodmongkol Vor Saengthep	UD	10	2022-09-07	Muaklek Technical College, Muak Lek, Thailand	For ABF (Asian) super-flyweight title
56	Win	38–17–1	(Thailand) Dawit Choemueku	TKO	2 (6), 2:10	2022-06-28	Rangsit International Stadium, Rangsit, Thailand	
55	Win	37–17–1	(Thailand) Yotnakhrop Mor Wattanachai	TKO	3 (6), 1:47	2022-04-03	Singmanassak Muaythai School, Pathum Thani, Thailand	
54	Loss	36–17–1	(Thailand) Yodmongkol Vor Saengthep	UD	6	2021-12-28	Rangsit International Stadium, Rangsit, Thailand	For vacant ABF (Asian) super-flyweight title
53	Win	36–16–1	(Thailand) Pornthep Wadngam	UD	6	2021-12-28	Rangsit International Stadium, Rangsit, Thailand	
52	Win	35–16–1	(Thailand) Narongchai Aksornchoo	UD	6	2021-11-23	Rangsit International Stadium, Rangsit, Thailand	
51	Loss	34–16–1	(Thailand) Jakrawut Majungoen	UD	10	2021-03-06	Rangsit International Stadium, Rangsit, Thailand	For vacant ABCO Silver super-flyweight title
50	Loss	34–15–1	(Thailand) Thitisak Hoitong	UD	6	2020-11-08	Blue Arena, Samut Prakan, Thailand	
49	Loss	34–14–1	(Thailand) Nattapong Jankaew	UD	10	2020-09-06	Blue Arena, Samut Prakan, Thailand	
48	Loss	34–13–1	(Thailand) Sanhajate Kaewpoon	UD	6	2019-12-22	Sathian Muaythai Gym and Fitness, Bangkok, Thailand	
47	Loss	34–12–1	(Thailand) Thananchai Charunphak	UD	6	2019-10-19	Workpoint Studio, Bang Phun, Thailand	
46	Loss	34–11–1	(Thailand) Phongsaphon Panyakum	UD	6	2019-08-17	Workpoint Studio, Bang Phun, Thailand	
45	Loss	34–10–1	(Japan) Naoki Mochizuki	UD	8	2019-06-11	Korakuen Hall, Tokyo, Japan	
44	Win	34–9–1	(Thailand) Worawatchai Boonjan	UD	6	2019-04-20	Workpoint Studio, Bang Phun, Thailand	
43	Loss	33–9–1	(Indonesia) Tibo Monabesa	UD	10	2019-03-29	Balai Kota, Malang, Indonesia	
42	Draw	33–8–1	(Thailand) Namphol Sithsaithong	PTS	6	2018-10-20	Workpoint Studio, Bang Phun, Thailand	
41	Loss	33–8	(Thailand) Lerdchai Chaiyawed	UD	6	2018-06-23	Workpoint Studio, Bang Phun, Thailand	
40	Loss	33–7	(Philippines) Mark Barriga	UD	12	2017-09-29	Heyuan Royal Garden Hotel, Beijing, China	For vacant WBO International minimumweight title
39	Win	33–6	(Indonesia) Samuel Tehuayo	UD	6	2017-07-27	Suamlum Night Bazaar, Ratchadaphisek, Bangkok, Thailand	
38	Win	32–6	(Indonesia) Ical Tobida	UD	12	2017-03-23	Dansiam Technology College, Sakon Nakhon, Thailand	Won vacant PABA minimumweight title
37	Loss	31–6	(Japan) Akira Yaegashi	TKO	12 (12), 2:13	2016-12-30	Ariake Colosseum, Tokyo, Japan	For IBF light-flyweight title
36	Win	31–5	(Indonesia) Tommy Seran	TKO	7 (12), 1:23	2016-11-24	Ratchabhak University, Maha Sarakham Campus, Maha Sarakham, Thailand	Retained ABCO minimumweight title
35	Win	30–5	(Indonesia) Samuel Tehuayo	UD	12	2016-09-22	Pasak Village, Lop Buri, Thailand	Retained PABA minimumweight title
34	Win	29–5	(Indonesia) Ical Tobida	UD	6	2016-08-25	Mueang Thong Thani Stadium, Muang Thong Thani, Thailand	
33	Win	28–5	(Indonesia) Stevanus Nana Bau	KO	6 (12)	2016-07-01	Suamlum Night Bazaar, Ratchadaphisek, Bangkok, Thailand	Retained PABA minimumweight title
32	Win	27–5	(Indonesia) Domi Nenokeba	UD	6	2016-05-29	Suamlum Night Bazaar, Ratchadaphisek, Bangkok, Thailand	
31	Win	26–5	(Indonesia) Boy Tanto	TKO	7 (12)	2016-04-21	Wat Banyang, Prakhonchai, Buriram, Thailand	Retained ABCO minimumweight title
30	Win	25–5	(Indonesia) Heri Amol	UD	12	2016-03-24	Community College of Nan, Nan, Thailand	Retained PABA minimumweight title
29	Win	24–5	(Indonesia) Hengky Baransano	TKO	3 (12)	2016-01-29	Namuang City Hall Ground, Nakhon Si Thammarat, Thailand	Won vacant PABA minimumweight title
28	Win	23–5	(Indonesia) Fanther Ndahiuw	TKO	8 (12)	2015-10-09	Saigon Stadium, Mae Mor, Lampang, Thailand	Won vacant ABCO minimumweight title
27	Win	22–5	(Indonesia) Iwan Key	KO	3 (6)	2015-09-04	Saimai District, Bangkok, Thailand	
26	Win	21–5	Fahpratan Sor Por Por Laos	KO	3 (6)	2015-06-13	Wat Ban Rai, Wangnamkeo, Nakhon Ratchasima, Thailand	
25	Win	20–5	(Indonesia) Jack Amisa	PTS	6	2015-03-29	Pattaya Boxing World, Pattaya, Thailand	
24	Win	19–5	(Indonesia) Ical Tobida	UD	6	2015-02-28	Pattaya Boxing World, Pattaya, Thailand	
23	Win	18–5	(Philippines) Richie Behec	PTS	6	2015-01-31	Pattaya Boxing World, Pattaya, Thailand	
22	Loss	17–5	(Japan) Naoya Inoue	KO	11 (12), 1:08	2014-09-05	Yoyogi #2 Gymnasium, Tokyo, Japan	For WBC light-flyweight title
21	Win	17–4	(Indonesia) Domi Nenokeba	UD	6	2014-07-10	Pak Kret Pier, Pak Kret, Thailand	
20	Win	16–4	(Indonesia) Samuel Tehuayo	UD	6	2014-06-06	Sawan Vegas Hotel, Savannakhet, Laos	
19	Win	15–4	(Philippines) Jimmy Masangkay	UD	12	2014-01-10	Lad Sawai, Pathum Thani, Thailand	Won PABA minimumweight Title
18	Win	14–4	(India) Sandeep Kumar	KO	8 (12)	2013-10-03	Ban Rai Temple, Nakhon Ratchasima, Thailand	
17	Win	13–4	Unknown	PTS	6	2013-07-12	Sawang Daen Din, Thailand	
16	Win	12-4	Unknown	PTS	6	2013-04-09	Chiranakorn Stadium, Songkhla, Thailand	
15	Win	11–4	(Indonesia) Johan Wahyudi	MD	10	2013-03-08	Kiensa District, Surat Thani, Thailand	
14	Win	10–4	(Indonesia) Jack Amisa	UD	12	2012-11-06	Municipality of Klongplu, Nong Yai, Thailand	
13	Win	9–4	(China) Ma Wu Ling	RTD	2 (6), 3:00	2012-09-13	MBK Center, Bangkok, Thailand	
12	Loss	8–4	(Philippines) Randy Petalcorin	UD	12	2012-04-21	Mandaluyong Gym, Mandaluyong Sports Center, Mandaluyong, Philippines	For vacant PABA light-flyweight title
11	Win	8–3	(Indonesia) Samuel Tehuayo	UD	10	2012-02-12	Petkasem Management of Science School, Bangkok, Thailand	
10	Loss	7–3	(Japan) Yuki Chinen	UD	8	2011-11-06	City Gymnasium, Urasoe, Japan	
9	Win	7–2	(Indonesia) Erick Diaz Siregar	PTS	6	2011-08-19	Samut Sakhon, Thailand	
8	Win	6–2	(Thailand) Lookrak Kiatmungmee	KO	2 (6)	2011-06-17	Krirk University, Bangkok, Thailand	
7	Win	5–2	(Thailand) Samingkao Sor Thantawan	TKO	4 (6)	2011-05-20	Mayong OTOP Center, Rayong, Thailand	
6	Loss	4–2	(Philippines) Denver Cuello	TKO	9 (12), 1:12	2011-03-26	Ynares Gym,Angono, Philippines	For WBC International minimumweight title
5	Win	4–1	(Indonesia) Muhammad Rachman	PTS	6	2011-01-24	Bangkantak, Samut Songkhram, Thailand	
4	Win	3–1	(Thailand) Tanawat Phonnaku	PTS	6	2010-12-28	Laplae, Thailand	
3	Win	2–1	(Thailand) Teeraphong Utaida	PTS	6	2010-12-17	Choenbung, Ratchaburi, Thailand	
2	Loss	1–1	(Thailand) Tanawat Phonnaku	PTS	6	2010-10-13	Tiakuihuwat Market, Bang Bo, Thailand	
1	Win	1–0	(Thailand) Khunphon Kiatpracha Gym	TKO	3 (4)	2010-09-24	Siam Society Hotel and Resort, Bangkok, Thailand	
