= Javier Mendoza (boxer) =

Mexican boxer

Personal information
- Nickname: Cobra
- Born: 5 March 1991 (age 35) Tijuana, Mexico
- Height: 5 ft 4 in (163 cm)
- Weight: Light flyweight

Boxing career
- Reach: 68 1/2 in (174 cm)
- Stance: Southpaw

Boxing record
- Total fights: 30
- Wins: 25
- Win by KO: 20
- Losses: 4
- Draws: 1
- No contests: 0

Javier Mendoza (born March 5, 1991) is a Mexican professional boxer and a former IBF Light flyweight champion.

== Professional career ==
On September 20, 2014, Mendoza captured the vacant IBF Light Flyweight title by defeating former champion Ramón García Hirales via unanimous decision.

== Professional boxing record ==
30 fights	25 wins	4 losses
By knockout	20	2
By decision	5	2
Draws	1	

Result	Record	Opponent	Type	Round, time	Date	Location	Notes
Win	25–4–1	(Mexico) Manuel Jimenez	TKO	1 (6), 2:01	2022-10-28	Tijuana, Mexico	
Loss	24–4–1	(Mexico) Ulises Lara	TKO	4 (10), 1:05	2016-10-22	Auditorio Fausto Gutierrez Moreno, Tijuana, Mexico	
Loss	24–3–1	(Japan) Akira Yaegashi	UD	12	2015-12-29	Ariake Coliseum, Tokyo, Japan	Lost IBF light flyweight title.
Win	24–2–1	(Philippines) Milan Melindo	TD	6 (12), 2:39	2015-05-30	Centro Ceremonial Otomí, Temoaya, Mexico	Retained IBF light flyweight title.
Win	23–2–1	(Colombia) Mauricio Fuentes	TKO	2 (10)	2015-01-10	Auditorio Fausto Gutierrez Moreno, Tijuana, Mexico	
Win	22–2–1	(Mexico) Ramón García Hirales	UD	12	2014-09-20	Auditorio Fausto Gutierrez Moreno, Tijuana, Mexico	Won vacant IBF light flyweight title.
Win	21–2–1	(Mexico) Ricardo Armenta	KO	3 (6), 2:57	2013-06-07	Avenida Revolución, Tijuana, Mexico	
Win	20–2–1	(Mexico) Javier Meraz	TKO	2 (10), 1:42	2012-12-21	Restaurant Olivaritos, Tijuana, Mexico	
Win	19–2–1	(Mexico) Cristian Aguilar	KO	2 (10), 0:57	2012-08-04	Centro de Convenciones, Mazatlán, Mexico	
Win	18–2–1	(Mexico) Arcadio Salazar	KO	2 (8), 2:51	2012-06-23	Casino Hipodromo Agua Caliente, Tijuana, Mexico	
Win	17–2–1	(Mexico) Francisco Aguilar	KO	1 (4), 1:44	2012-04-23	Auditorio Fausto Gutierrez Moreno, Tijuana, Mexico	
Win	16–2–1	(Mexico) Armando Vazquez	KO	7 (12), 2:14	2012-02-11	Auditorio Fausto Gutierrez Moreno, Tijuana, Mexico	Retained WBC Continental Americas light flyweight title.
Win	15–2–1	(Mexico) Arcadio Salazar	TKO	1 (8), 2:57	2011-12-10	Plaza de Toros Calafia, Mexicali, Mexico	
Win	14–2–1	(Mexico) German Aaron Cota	TKO	4 (8), 1:27	2011-10-22	Auditorio Luis Estrada Medina, Guasave, Mexico	
Loss	13–2–1	(Mexico) Jorge Guerrero	TKO	2 (8)	2011-07-08	Auditorio Fausto Gutierrez Moreno, Tijuana, Mexico	
Win	13–1–1	(Mexico) Osvaldo Ibarra	TKO	4 (12), 2:36	2010-06-12	Auditorio Fausto Gutierrez Moreno, Tijuana, Mexico	Won vacant WBC Continental Americas light flyweight title.
Win	12–1–1	(Mexico) Rigoberto Casillas	TKO	2 (8), 2:19	2010-02-20	Gimnasio Mariano Matamoros, Tijuana, Mexico	
Win	11–1–1	(Mexico) Ricardo Armenta	TKO	2 (6), 2:34	2009-12-05	Gimnasio Mariano Matamoros, Tijuana, Mexico	
Win	10–1–1	(Mexico) Francisco Aguilar	TKO	5 (6), 1:08	2009-09-05	Auditorio Fausto Gutierrez Moreno, Tijuana, Mexico	
Win	9–1–1	(Mexico) Rogelio Armenta	UD	6	2009-08-01	Auditorio Fausto Gutierrez Moreno, Tijuana, Mexico	
Win	8–1–1	(Mexico) Manuel Galaviz	TKO	2 (6), 2:24	2009-06-20	Auditorio Fausto Gutierrez Moreno, Tijuana, Mexico	
Win	7–1–1	(Mexico) Juan Manuel Armendariz	KO	2 (6), 2:45	2008-12-20	El Foro, Tijuana, Mexico	
Win	6–1–1	(Mexico) Arcadio Salcido	TKO	1 (6), 1:52	2008-08-23	El Foro, Tijuana, Mexico	
Win	5–1–1	(Mexico) Juan Manuel Armendariz	KO	1 (4), 2:51	2008-08-02	Avenida Revolución, Tijuana, Mexico	
Loss	4–1–1	(Mexico) Manuel Jiménez	UD	4	2008-07-13	Avenida Revolución, Tijuana, Mexico	
Win	4–0–1	(Mexico) Gustavo Enriquez	KO	2 (4), 2:18	2008-05-31	El Foro, Tijuana, Mexico	
Win	3–0–1	(Mexico) Felipe Salguero	MD	4	2008-05-02	Gimnasio Mariano Matamoros, Tijuana, Mexico	
Draw	2–0–1	(Mexico) Ernesto Armenta	PTS	4	2008-04-05	Auditorio Fausto Gutierrez Moreno, Tijuana, Mexico	
Win	2–0	(Mexico) Jesus Juarez	KO	3 (4), 1:03	2007-10-26	Auditorio el Barretal, Tijuana, Mexico	
Win	1–0	(Mexico) Ernesto Armenta	UD	4	2007-09-07	Auditorio el Barretal, Tijuana, Mexico	

== See also ==
- List of light-flyweight boxing champions
- List of Mexican boxing world champions

Achievements
Vacant Title last held by Johnriel Casimero	IBF light flyweight champion September 20, 2014 - December 29, 2015	Succeeded by Akira Yaegashi
