= Hiroto Kyoguchi =

Japanese boxer (born 1993)

Personal information
- Nicknames: Mad Boy; Dynamite Boy
- Born: 京口紘人; November 27, 1993 (age 32) Izumi, Osaka, Japan
- Height: 5 ft 5 in (165 cm)
- Weight: Mini-flyweight; Light-flyweight

Boxing career
- Reach: 66 in (168 cm)
- Stance: Orthodox

Boxing record
- Total fights: 22
- Wins: 19
- Win by KO: 12
- Losses: 3

Hiroto Kyoguchi (京口 紘人, Kyōguchi Hiroto; born November 27, 1993) is a Japanese former professional boxer who competed from 2016 to 2025. He is a two-weight world champion, having held the International Boxing Federation (IBF) mini-flyweight title from 2017 to 2018, and the World Boxing Association (WBA) (Super version) and Ring magazine light-flyweight titles from 2018 to 2022.

== Professional career ==
=== Early career ===
Kyoguchi made his professional debut against Narathip Sungsut on April 17, 2016. He won the fight by a second-round knockout. This victory was followed by four consecutive stoppage victories, during which he defeated Taweechai Yuyuet by a first-round technical knockout, Kenichi Miyazaki by a third-round technical knockout, Michael Camelion by a 33-second knockout and Junuel Lacar by a third-round knockout.

He was scheduled to fight Armando de la Cruz for the OPBF minimumweight title in his sixth fight, on February 28, 2017. He won the fight by a third-round knockout. Kyoguchi was scheduled to defend his OPBF minimum against Jonathan Refugio, on April 25, 2017. He beat Refugio by unanimous decision, with the judges scoring the bout 117–111, 118–111 and 119–109 in Kyoguchi's favor.

=== IBF mini-flyweight champion ===
==== Kyoguchi vs. Argumedo ====
Kyoguchi was scheduled to fight the reigning IBF mini-flyweight champion Jose Argumedo in the latter's fourth title defense, on July 23, 2017. Due to his lack of professional experience and world title fight, Kyoguchi came into the fight as the betting underdog to the more accomplished Argumedo. The fight itself was a messy affair, with a lot of clinching and slipping to the mat. Kyoguchi scored the only knockdown of the fight in the ninth round, dropping Argumedo with a left. He won the fight by unanimous decision, with two of the judges scoring the fight 116–111 in his favor, while the third judge scored it 115–112 for Kyoguchi. He became the first Japanese boxer to win a world title in the shortest amount of time, at 1 year and 3 months.

==== Kyoguchi vs. Buitrago ====
Kyoguchi was scheduled to make his first IBF mini-flyweight title defense against the former WBO and IBF mini flyweight champion Carlos Buitrago, on December 31, 2017. The fight was scheduled as the co-main event to the Ryoichi Taguchi and Milan Melindo fight. Kyoguchi established distance early on with the jab, and began accumulating damage on his opponent with a combination of body-head power shots. Kyoguchi won the fight by an eight-round technical knockout, which was the first stoppage loss in Buitrago's professional career. During the post-fight press conference, Kyoguchi stated his desire to fight either Hekkie Budler or Kenshiro Teraji.

==== Kyoguchi vs. Paras ====
Kyoguchi was scheduled to make his second IBF mini-flyweight title defense against the #15 IBF light flyweight contender Vince Paras, on May 20, 2018. It was the second consecutive time he fought on the Ryoichi Taguchi undercard, as Taguchi took on Hekkie Budler. Kyoguchi handed Paras his first professional loss, as he won the fight by a wide unanimous decision, with all three judges scoring the fight 117-110 for Kyoguchi.

On July 27, 2018, Kyoguchi stated he would vacate his IBF title, as he was no longer confident of successful cutting down to mini-flyweight. He officially vacated the title on August 11, 2018.

=== WBA and The Ring light-flyweight champion ===
==== Kyoguchi vs. Budler ====
Kyoguchi was scheduled to challenge the reigning WBA (Super) and The Ring light-flyweight champion Hekkie Budler on December 31, 2018. The fight was on the undercard of the Donnie Nietes and Kazuto Ioka main event, and was Kyoguchi's second fight outside of Japan. Kyoguchi came into the fight as a favorite over Budler.

The two fighters were on an even playing field for the first half of the fight, before Kyoguchi took over in the seventh and began landing more frequent power shots to the head and body. Budler appeared to have issues with his cardio and breathing. Kyoguchi won the fight by technical knockout in the tenth round, after Budler retired from the bout, and was ahead on the official scorecards when the fight was stopped. Budler later confirmed that he was having sinus issues going into the fight.

==== Kyoguchi vs. Satanmuanglek ====
Kyoguchi was scheduled to make his first title defenses against the reigning World Boxing Council Asian Boxing champion Satanmuanglek CP Freshmart, on June 19, 2019, on the Kazuto Ioka versus Aston Palicte undercard. Although Satanmuanglek had fought for world titles in muay thai, having held the Lumpinee Stadium title in two weight classes, this was his first boxing world title fight. During the pre-fight press conference, Kyoguchi stated his desire to fight his fellow countryman Kenshiro Teraji in a light flyweight title unification bout. Kyoguchi defeated Satanmuanglek by unanimous decision, with two of the judges scoring the fight 117–111 in his favor, while the third judge scored the bout 117–112 for Kyoguchi.

==== Kyoguchi vs. Hisada ====
Kyoguchi was scheduled to make the second defense of his WBA (Super) and The Ring light-flyweight titles against Tetsuya Hisada, on October 1, 2019. This was Hisada's first world title challenge in 46 professional fights, and Kyoguchi entered the fight as a significant betting favorite. Kyoguchi remained in control for the duration of the bout, managing to score a knockdown in the ninth round, but being unable to finish Hisada. Kyoguchi won by unanimous decision, with scores of 115–112, 116–111 and 117–110.

Kyoguchi was scheduled to make his third WBA title defense against Thanongsak Simsri on November 3, 2020. Simsri was at the time the 11th-ranked contender in the WBA light flyweight rankings. On November 2, 2020, one day before the fight, Kyoguchi announced he was unable to fight, as both he and his coaches had contracted COVID-19.

==== Kyoguchi vs. Vega ====
Kyoguchi was scheduled to defend his WBA (Super) and The Ring light-flyweight titles against Axel Aragon Vega, on March 13, 2021, on the undercard of the Juan Francisco Estrada and Román González card. As this was his United States debut, Kyoguchi signed a multi-fight deal Matchroom Boxing, who would be responsible for promoting Kyoguchi's overseas fights. This was Kyoguchi's first fight after a year and a half of inactivity, having pulled out of a scheduled match with Thanongsak Simsri on November 2, 2020, after Kyoguchi and his corner contracted COVID-19. Kyoguchi came into the bout as a significant betting favorite.

Kyoguchi failed to make use of his 7-inch height and 6 inch reach advantage, spending the duration of the bout trading power shots in either the clinch or the pocket with his shorter opponent. Many boxing experts expected a different strategy from the champion. The fight ended after the fifth round, as Vega retired from the fight due to a hand injury. He had injured his hand in the earlier rounds, but an overhead right hand in the fifth aggravated the injury, forcing Vega to withdraw.

==== Kyoguchi vs. Bermudez ====
On June 10, 2021, Kyoguchi was ordered by the WBA to face the WBA Regular champion Esteban Bermudez in a unification match. However, on September 16, DAZN announced that Bermudez would make a voluntary title defense against the unbeaten Jesse “Bam” Rodriguez. The WBA later confirmed that Bermudez was still tied to ordered title fight with Kyoguchi and hadn't approved his fight with Rodriguez. On October 21, 2021, the WBA gave them an additional ten day to come to terms regarding the fight, and furthermore stated: "If there is no agreement or if any of the parties express unwillingness to agree on the fight, [a purse bid] will be called.” The two camps finally came to terms for a title consolidation bout on November 12, 2021. On December 9, 2021, it was revealed that the fight would take place on January 15, 2022, in Mexico, at a venue that would be announced at a later date. On December 29, 2021, the WBA gave fight promoter Matchroom Boxing a ten-day period to deliver proof of firm plans that the title consolidation bout would take place. The WBA scheduled a purse bid for January 22, 2022, after Matchroom failed to provide sufficient proof that a bout would take place. On January 27, 2022, the WBA allowed Bermudez to make a voluntary title defense against Carlos Cañizales, as Kyoguchi withdrew from the scheduled purse bid due to an injury. The bout didn't take place however, as Cañizales opted to face Ganigan López for the vacant WBA Continental Americans flyweight title instead.

The title bout with Bermudez was rescheduled for June 10, 2022, as the main event of a DAZN broadcast card which will take place in Mexico City, Mexico. The venue was later changed to the Domo Alcalde in Guadalajara, Mexico, as Kyogochi's team was concerned with how the higher elevation of Mexico City might affect him. Kyoguchi retained the title by a technical knockout, halting Bermudez with a flurry of punches at the 0:24 minute mark of the eight round. He was leading on two of the judges' scorecards at the time of the stoppage, with scores of 66–65, while the third judge had Bermudez up 66–65. Kyoguchi knocked Bermudez down in the seventh round, but was deducted a point in the sixth and seventh round, for headbutting and rabbit punching respectively. Bermudez was examined by the ringside physician at the end of the second and seventh rounds, due to a cut above his left eyelid which he suffered early in the second round.

==== Kyoguchi vs. Teraji ====
Kyoguchi faced the two-time WBC light flyweight champion Kenshiro Teraji in a title unification match on November 1, 2022. It was just the second-ever unification bout between reigning titlists from Japan, while the winner of the bout was expected to become the first recognized lineal champion in more than a decade, since Giovani Segura vacated his title in 2011. Kyoguchi lost the fight by a seventh-round technical knockout. He was knocked down by a right cross in the fifth round, before the referee stopped the bout in the seventh round, as he judged Kyoguchi to have suffered too much damage.

=== Flyweight ===
Kyoguchi made his flyweight debut against the journeyman Roland Jay Biendima, at a minor show in Sumida City Gymnasium in Sumida, Tokyo on May 20, 2023. He won the fight by a dominant unanimous decision, with all three ringside officials awarding him all ten rounds of the bout.

He challenged WBO flyweight champion Anthony Olascuaga at Ryōgoku Kokugikan in Tokyo on 13 March 2025, losing via unanimous decision.

=== Retirement ===
In July 2025, Kyoguchi announced his retirement, at the age of 31. In a post on sanspo.com, he wrote: "I have decided to retire. Thank you very much. I have had a professional career that went beyond what I had imagined. I am very happy to be hanging up my gloves here. It has been a wonderful boxing life. Boxing is the best." He ended his career with 19 wins and 3 losses in the professional ranks.

== Professional boxing record ==
22 fights	19 wins	3 losses
By knockout	12	1
By decision	7	2

No.	Result	Record	Opponent	Type	Round, time	Date	Location	Notes
22	Loss	19–3	Anthony Olascuaga	UD	12	Mar 13, 2025	Ryōgoku Kokugikan, Tokyo, Japan	For WBO flyweight title
21	Win	19–2	Vince Paras	MD	10	Oct 13, 2024	Yokohama Budokan, Yokohama, Japan	
20	Loss	18–2	Vince Paras	UD	10	May 11, 2024	Paradise City Plaza, Incheon, South Korea	
19	Win	18–1	Jerven Mama	KO	3 (10), 2:59	Sep 22, 2023	Korakuen Hall, Tokyo, Japan	
18	Win	17–1	Roland Jay Biendima	UD	10	May 20, 2023	Sumida City Gymnasium, Sumida, Japan	
17	Loss	16–1	Kenshiro Teraji	TKO	7 (12), 2:36	Nov 1, 2022	Saitama Super Arena, Saitama, Japan	Lost WBA (Super) and The Ring light-flyweight titles; For WBC light-flyweight title
16	Win	16–0	Esteban Bermudez	TKO	8 (12), 0:24	Jun 10, 2022	Domo Alcalde, Guadalajara, Mexico	Retained WBA (Super) and The Ring light-flyweight titles
15	Win	15–0	Axel Aragon Vega	TKO	5 (12), 1:32	Mar 13, 2021	American Airlines Center, Dallas, Texas, U.S	Retained WBA (Super) and The Ring light-flyweight titles
14	Win	14–0	Tetsuya Hisada	UD	12	Oct 1, 2019	Edion Arena, Osaka, Japan	Retained WBA (Super) and The Ring light-flyweight titles
13	Win	13–0	Satanmuanglek CP Freshmart	UD	12	Jun 19, 2019	Makuhari Messe, Chiba, Japan	Retained WBA (Super) and The Ring light-flyweight titles
12	Win	12–0	Hekkie Budler	TKO	10 (12), 0:16	Dec 31, 2018	Wynn Palace, Macau, SAR, China	Won WBA (Super) and The Ring light-flyweight titles
11	Win	11–0	Tibo Monabesa	TKO	4 (10), 2:20	Sep 25, 2018	Korakuen Hall, Tokyo, Japan	
10	Win	10–0	Vince Paras	UD	12	May 20, 2018	Ota City General Gymnasium, Tokyo, Japan	Retained IBF mini-flyweight title
9	Win	9–0	Carlos Buitrago	TKO	8 (12), 2:28	Dec 31, 2017	Ota City General Gymnasium, Tokyo, Japan	Retained IBF mini-flyweight title
8	Win	8–0	Jose Argumedo	UD	12	Jul 23, 2017	Ota City General Gymnasium, Tokyo, Japan	Won IBF mini-flyweight title
7	Win	7–0	Jonathan Refugio	UD	12	Apr 25, 2017	Korakuen Hall, Tokyo, Japan	Retained OPBF mini-flyweight title
6	Win	6–0	Armando de la Cruz	KO	3 (12), 2:02	Feb 28, 2017	Korakuen Hall, Tokyo, Japan	Won vacant OPBF mini-flyweight title
5	Win	5–0	Junuel Lacar	KO	3 (6), 0:46	Dec 31, 2016	Ota City General Gymnasium, Tokyo, Japan	
4	Win	4–0	Michael Camelion	KO	1 (8), 0:33	Nov 15, 2016	Korakuen Hall, Tokyo, Japan	
3	Win	3–0	Kenichi Miyazaki	TKO	3 (8), 0:39	Aug 7, 2016	Edion Arena, Osaka, Japan	
2	Win	2–0	Taweechai Yuyuet	TKO	1 (6), 0:33	May 16, 2016	Meenayothin Camp, Bangkok, Thailand	
1	Win	1–0	Narathip Sungsut	KO	2 (6), 2:55	Apr 17, 2016	Edion Arena, Osaka, Japan	

== Titles in boxing ==
=== Major world titles ===
- IBF mini-flyweight champion (105 lbs)
- WBA (Super) light-flyweight champion (108 lbs)

=== The Ring magazine titles ===
- The Ring light-flyweight champion (108 lbs)

=== Regional/International titles ===
- OPBF mini-flyweight champion (105 lbs)

== See also ==
- List of mini-flyweight boxing champions
- List of light-flyweight boxing champions
- List of Japanese boxing world champions

Sporting positions
Regional boxing titles
Vacant Title last held by Ryuya Yamanaka	OPBF mini-flyweight champion February 28, 2017 – July 13, 2017; Vacated	Vacant Title next held by Tsubasa Koura
World boxing titles
Preceded by Jose Argumedo	IBF mini-flyweight champion July 23, 2017 – August 11, 2018; Vacated	Vacant Title next held by Carlos Licona
Preceded by Hekkie Budler	WBA light-flyweight champion Super title December 31, 2018 – November 1, 2022	Succeeded by Kenshiro Teraji
Preceded by Hekkie Budler	The Ring light-flyweight champion December 31, 2018 – November 1, 2022	Succeeded by Kenshiro Teraji
