= Kenshiro Teraji =

Japanese boxer (born 1992)

Kenshiro Teraji 寺地拳四朗
Personal information
- Nickname: The Amazing Boy
- Born: 6 January 1992 (age 34) Jōyō, Kyoto, Japan
- Height: 5 ft 5 in (165 cm)
- Weight: Light flyweight; Flyweight; Super flyweight

Boxing career
- Reach: 64 1/2 in (164 cm)
- Stance: Orthodox

Boxing record
- Total fights: 28
- Wins: 26
- Win by KO: 16
- Losses: 2

Kenshiro Teraji (寺地 拳四朗, Teraji Kenshirō; born 6 January 1992), also known as Ken Shiro (ケンシロウ, Ken Shirō), is a Japanese professional boxer. He has held world titles in three weight divisions from light-flyweight to junior-bantamweight including the World Boxing Organization (WBO) junior-bantamweight title since July 2026.

== Early life ==
Teraji is the son of Hisashi Teraji, a boxer who won the OPBF light heavyweight and Japanese national middleweight title. Hisashi's sole professional loss came against future world champion Shinji Takehara. He retired in 2000, at the age of 36. Teraji followed in his father's footsteps and accrued a 58–16 amateur record between 2007 and 2014.

== Professional career ==
=== Early career ===
Teraji made his professional debut in August 2014, winning a six-round unanimous decision (60-53, 60–53, 59–54) against Heri Amol. Amol went down in round 4, after a right hand to the body. Teraji won his first belt in October 2015, beating Rolly Sumalpong for the WBC Youth light flyweight title by unanimous decision (97-91, 96–92, 96–92). During round 1, Teraji was dropped for the first time in his career but he adjusted and did enough to get the win. On his next fight, Teraji went on to claim the Japanese national light flyweight title, beating Kenichi Horikawa with a unanimous decision (98–93, 98–93, 97–93). In August 2016, Teraji claimed the OPBF title with another unanimous decision win (119-108, 119–109, 117–111) over Toshimasa Ouchi. The bout was Teraji’s first 12-round fight.

=== WBC light flyweight champion ===
==== Teraji vs. López I ====
In May 2017, Teraji was scheduled to face the reigning WBC light flyweight world champion Ganigan López, in what was his 10th professional bout and López's second title defense.

Teraji won the closely contested bout by unanimous decision, with two of the judges scoring the fight 115–113 in his favor, and the third judge scoring the fight a 114–114 draw. Teraji was leading the fight on the scorecards going into the eight round, after which López managed to make a comeback. Teraji later stated he was unsure of how the judges had scored the fight, which was the reason why he engaged in trading power shots in the final round, attempting to knock López out. During the post-fight press conference, Teraji claimed he was dissatisfied with how he fought, saying he was too nervous in his first world title challenge to fight how he usually does.

Teraji first fight with López was broadcast on Fuji TV and had an audience rating of 9.5% in the Kantō region, with about 1.76 million live viewers in Tokyo area alone.

==== Teraji vs. Guevara ====
Teraji was scheduled to make his first title defense against the former WBC light flyweight champion Pedro Guevara on October 22, 2017. Guevara had previously fought twice in Japan, having unseated Akira Yaegashi to claim the WBC title, at the Tokyo Metropolitan Gymnasium, and then losing his title to Yu Kimura in Sendai in a controversial split decision. The fight was a mandatory title bout, scheduled for the undercard of Ryota Murata’s rematch against WBA regular titlist Hassan N'Dam N'Jikam. Guevara started strongly but as the fight went on he started to slow down due to body shots, with the fight being scored as a draw after the first eight-round (78-74 Guevara, 77-75 Teraji and 76-76). Teraji rallied in the second half of the fight and won another narrow majority decision. Two of the judges scored the fight 115-113 and 116-112 for Teraji, while the third judge scored the fight a 114–114 draw. During the post-fight press conference, Teraji called for a rematch with Ganigan Lopez.

==== Teraji vs. Pedroza ====
Teraji was scheduled to defend his WBC light flyweight title for the third time against the #11 ranked WBC light flyweight Gilberto Pedroza, on December 30, 2017. During a pre-fight interview, Teraji stated he wanted to keep having at least three fights a year, in order to maintain his match fitness, as the reason for taking this fight. Teraji completely dominated the Panamanian fighter en route to a fourth-round technical knockout victory. Teraji knocked Pedroza down twice in the fourth round, with referee Laurence Cole deeming Pedroza unable to fight, following the second knockdown.

==== Teraji vs. López II ====
López was scheduled to make the third defense of his WBC light flyweight title in a rematch with the former champion Ganigan López, on May 25, 2018. Teraji won their first meeting by majority decision to become the WBC light flyweight champion. The fight was scheduled as the co-main event to the Naoya Inoue and Jamie McDonnell match. Teraji won the fight by a second-round body shot knockout. Mid-way through the second round, Shiro landed a right straight to the body of López, with López being unable to beat the ten-count. Teraji attributed his poor performance in their first meeting to the fact that he hadn't fought a southpaw up to that point, while he was more accustomed to fighting southpaw opponents in their second meeting.

==== Teraji vs. Melindo ====
Teraji was scheduled to mount the fourth defense of his WBC light flyweight title against the former IBF and IBO light flyweight champion Milan Melindo, on October 7, 2018. He once again fought on the undercard of Naoya Inoue, as Inoue took on Juan Carlos Payano. Teraji came into the fight as a 4/9 favorite. Teraji kept up a steady diet of jabs throughout the fight, which opened up a cut over Melindo's right eye. Near the end of the seventh round, referee Laurence Cole called in the ringside to doctor to assess the cut. The doctor decided to stop the fight, as Melindo's vision was compromised, which left him unable to continue fighting.

==== Teraji vs. Juárez ====
Teraji was scheduled to defend his WBC light flyweight title for the fifth time against the one-time WBC light flyweight title challenger Saúl Juárez. Teraji was a 1/12 betting favorite, as Juárez came into the fight with only a single victory in past six bouts. Teraji started the fight strongly, and remained dominant for the entirety of the bout. Two of the judges awarded him eleven of the twelve contested rounds, while the third judge scored every single round of the fight for Teraji.

==== Teraji vs. Taconing ====
Teraji was scheduled to make the sixth defense of his WBC light flyweight title against the reigning World Boxing Council International Light Flyweight champion Jonathan Taconing, on July 12, 2019. The fight was scheduled for the undercard of a middleweight match between Rob Brant and Ryota Murata. Teraji opened as a -3333 favorite to beat Taconing. Teraji won the fight by a fourth-round technical knockout. Early on in the fourth round, Teraji responded to Taconing's pressure by sidestepping and hitting his opponent with a counter-right straight. Although Taconing was able to stand up in time to beat the count, referee Frank Garza decided to stop the fight, deeming Taconing unable to continue fighting. During a post-fight interview, Teraji stated his desire to surpass Yoko Gushiken's legendary record of 13 title defenses.

==== Teraji vs. Petalcorin ====
Teraji was scheduled to fight the reigning IBF light flyweight champion Felix Alvarado in a title unification bout, on December 23, 2019. The fight was scheduled as one part of a Japanese triple header of title fights, which also featured Akira Yaegashi challenging Moruti Mthalane and Ryota Murata defending his WBA title against Steven Butler. Alvarado withdrew from the bout on November 19, 2020, due to a bronchial problem, which left him unable to train. Randy Petalcorin was announced as the replacement for Alvarado on November 22, 2020. It was Petalcorin's second title fight, having previously fought Felix Alvarado for the IBF light flyweight title. Petalcorin had a strong start to the fight, establishing his jab, which enabled him to win the first two rounds of the contest. Teraji began landing shots to the body of Petalcorin in the third round, scoring three body shot knockdowns. Although Petalcorin was able to beat the count on all three of those knockdowns, he was unable to do the same for the fourth knockdown, a minute into the fourth round.

==== Teraji vs. Hisada ====
Teraji was scheduled to make his eight WBC title defense against the mandatory challenger Tetsuya Hisada, on December 18, 2020. However, on November 15, 2020, Teraji was involved in a drunk driving incident, during which he drove into another persons property and crashed into a vehicle parked there. Following this incident, the Japanese Boxing Commission has suspended him for three months, issued a ¥3 million fine, and ordered him to perform between 48 and 200 hours community service. His eight title defense against Hisada was accordingly rescheduled for April 24, 2021. Teraji extended his title defense streak to eight, with a dominant decision victory over Hisada. Hisada was knocked down in the second round, and seemed unable to recover from it for the rest of the fight. Although he was unable to finish his opponent, Teraji nonetheless won the fight by a wide decision, with the scores of 118–109, 118-109 and 119–108.

=== Unified light flyweight champion ===
==== Teraji vs. Yabuki ====
Teraji was scheduled to make his ninth WBC title defense against the reigning Japanese light flyweight titlist Masamichi Yabuki on September 10, 2021, in his native Kyoto. Yabuki was the #1 ranked WBC light flyweight contender when the fight was booked. The fight was postponed on August 26, as both Teraji and his coach tested positive for COVID-19. The fight was rescheduled for September 22, 2021. Teraji lost the fight by a tenth-round technical knockout. After an even start to the fight, Teraji was unable to find his rhythm and appeared to be down on the judges' scorecards. The pace of the fight increased in the tenth round, with Yabuki winning most of the exchanges and unloading on Teraji near the end of the round, prompting the referee to stop the fight.

Two months after Teraji lost his belt, on November 15, 2021, representatives of both fighters held a press conference announcing that a rematch was in the works. The rematch for the WBC title was officially announced on January 24, 2022. It took place at the City Gym in Kyoto, Japan, on March 19, 2022. Teraji won the fight by a third-round knockout, flooring Yabuki with a right straight.

==== Teraji vs. Kyoguchi ====
Teraji faced the WBA (Super) and The Ring light flyweight titleholder Hiroto Kyoguchi in a title unification bout on November 1, 2022, in what was just the second ever title unification match between two titlists from Japan. The winner of the fight was expected to become the first recognized lineal champion in over a decade, since Giovani Segura vacated his title. He won the fight by a seventh-round technical knockout. The referee waved the bout off as Kyoguchi was unsteady on his feet and was unable to effectively defend. Teraji knocked his opponent down with a right cross in the fifth round.

==== Teraji vs. Olascuaga ====
On November 9, 2022, Teraji was ordered to make a mandatory title defense against the one-time unified light flyweight champion Hekkie Budler. Budler agreed to an undisclosed step-aside fee on January 11, 2023, which allowed Teraji to enter into negotiations with the WBO light flyweight champion Jonathan González. The title unification bout was expected to take place on April 8, 2023, in Tokyo, Japan. González withdrew from the bout on March 24, due to mycoplasma pneumonia. He was replaced by Anthony Olascuaga, a former sparring partner of Teraji. Teraji won the fight by a ninth-round technical knockout, after twice knocking Olascuaga down.

==== Teraji vs. Budler ====
Teraji was booked to make his second championship defense as a unified champion against the former WBA mini-flyweight and unified light-flyweight champion Hekkie Budler, who previously accepted step-aside money to allow Teraji to purse a unification bout with Jonathan González. The fight took place at the Ariake Arena in Tokyo, Japan on September 18, 2023. Teraji retained the title by a ninth-round technical knockout. He was ahead 80–72, 79–73 and 79–73 on the scorecards at the time of the stoppage.

==== Teraji vs. Cañizales ====
Teraji announced he would make his third title defense sometime in January, during a guest appearance on the "Excite Match SP" show, produced by Wowow on November 30, 2023. Two weeks later, on December 14, it was revealed Teraji would face Carlos Cañizales. The championship bout took place at the Edion Arena in Osaka, Japan on January 23, 2024. It headlined an event broadcast by Amazon Prime Video domestically in Japan and ESPN in the United States. Teraji won the fight by a narrow majority decision. Two of the ringside officials scored the fight 114–112 in his favor, while the third judge scored the contest an even 113–113.

=== WBC Flyweight Champion ===
==== Teraji vs. Rosales ====
On October 13, 2024 at Ariake Arena in Tokyo, Japan, Teraji defeated Cristofer Rosales via 11th-round TKO to win the vacant WBC flyweight title.

=== Unified WBC and WBA Flyweight Champion ===
==== Teraji vs. Akui ====
Teraji defended his WBC flyweight title against current WBA flyweight champion Seigo Yuri Akui in a championship unification at Ryogoku Kokugikan in Tokyo on March 13, 2025. Teraji won the fight defeating Akui by TKO in the 12th round with a barrage of punches.

==== Teraji vs. Sandoval ====
Teraji lost his titles to Ricardo Sandoval via split decision at Yokohama Cultural Gymnasium in Yokohama, Japan, on 30 July 2025. One ringside judge scored the fight 114–113 in his favor, while the other two had it for his opponent 117–110 and 115–112 respectively.

=== WBO junior-bantamweight champion ===
==== Teraji vs. González ====
Teraji defeated Israel González via unanimous decision to win the vacant WBO junior-bantamweight title at Ryōgoku Kokugikan in Tokyo on 20 July 2026.

== Professional boxing record ==
28 fights	26 wins	2 losses
By knockout	16	1
By decision	10	1

No.	Result	Record	Opponent	Type	Round, time	Date	Location	Notes
28	Win	26–2	Israel González	UD	12	20 Jul 2026	Ryōgoku Kokugikan, Tokyo, Japan	Won vacant WBO junior-bantamweight title
27	Loss	25–2	Ricardo Sandoval	SD	12	30 Jul 2025	Yokohama Cultural Gymnasium, Yokohama, Japan	Lost WBA and WBC flyweight titles
26	Win	25–1	Seigo Yuri Akui	TKO	12 (12), 1:29	13 Mar 2025	Ryōgoku Kokugikan, Tokyo, Japan	Retained WBC flyweight title; Won WBA flyweight title
25	Win	24–1	Cristofer Rosales	TKO	11 (12), 0:06	13 Oct 2024	Ariake Arena, Tokyo, Japan	Won vacant WBC flyweight title
24	Win	23–1	Carlos Cañizales	MD	12	23 Jan 2024	Edion Arena, Osaka, Japan	Retained WBA (Super), WBC, and The Ring light-flyweight titles
23	Win	22–1	Hekkie Budler	TKO	9 (12), 2:19	18 Sep 2023	Ariake Arena, Tokyo, Japan	Retained WBA (Super), WBC, and The Ring light-flyweight titles
22	Win	21–1	Anthony Olascuaga	TKO	9 (12), 0:58	8 Apr 2023	Ariake Arena, Tokyo, Japan	Retained WBA (Super), WBC, and The Ring light-flyweight titles
21	Win	20–1	Hiroto Kyoguchi	TKO	7 (12), 2:36	1 Nov 2022	Saitama Super Arena, Saitama, Japan	Retained WBC light-flyweight title; Won WBA (Super) and The Ring light-flyweight titles
20	Win	19–1	Masamichi Yabuki	KO	3 (12), 1:11	19 Mar 2022	City Gym, Kyoto, Japan	Won WBC light-flyweight title
19	Loss	18–1	Masamichi Yabuki	TKO	10 (12), 2:59	22 Sep 2021	City Gym, Kyoto, Japan	Lost WBC light-flyweight title
18	Win	18–0	Tetsuya Hisada	UD	12	24 Apr 2021	Edion Arena, Osaka, Japan	Retained WBC light-flyweight title
17	Win	17–0	Randy Petalcorin	TKO	4 (12), 1:08	23 Dec 2019	Yokohama Arena, Yokohama, Japan	Retained WBC light-flyweight title
16	Win	16–0	Jonathan Taconing	TKO	4 (12), 1:00	12 Jul 2019	Edion Arena, Osaka, Japan	Retained WBC light-flyweight title
15	Win	15–0	Saúl Juárez	UD	12	30 Dec 2018	Ota City General Gymnasium, Tokyo, Japan	Retained WBC light-flyweight title
14	Win	14–0	Milan Melindo	TKO	7 (12), 2:47	7 Oct 2018	Yokohama Arena, Yokohama, Japan	Retained WBC light-flyweight title
13	Win	13–0	Ganigan López	TKO	2 (12), 1:58	25 May 2018	Ota City General Gymnasium, Tokyo, Japan	Retained WBC light-flyweight title
12	Win	12–0	Gilberto Pedroza	TKO	4 (12), 1:12	30 Dec 2017	Yokohama Cultural Gymnasium, Yokohama, Japan	Retained WBC light-flyweight title
11	Win	11–0	Pedro Guevara	MD	12	22 Oct 2017	Ryōgoku Kokugikan, Tokyo, Japan	Retained WBC light-flyweight title
10	Win	10–0	Ganigan López	MD	12	20 May 2017	Ariake Coliseum, Tokyo, Japan	Won WBC light-flyweight title
9	Win	9–0	Lester Abutan	TKO	3 (12), 1:57	8 Dec 2016	Korakuen Hall, Tokyo, Japan	Retained OPBF light-flyweight title
8	Win	8–0	Toshimasa Ouchi	UD	12	7 Aug 2016	Edion Arena, Osaka, Japan	Retained Japanese light-flyweight title; Won vacant OPBF light-flyweight title
7	Win	7–0	Atsushi Kakutani	TKO	1 (10), 2:53	14 Apr 2016	Korakuen Hall, Tokyo, Japan	Retained Japanese light-flyweight title
6	Win	6–0	Kenichi Horikawa	UD	10	27 Dec 2015	Oyamazakicho Gym, Kyoto, Japan	Won Japanese light-flyweight title
5	Win	5–0	Rolly Sumalpong	UD	10	12 Oct 2015	Korakuen Hall, Tokyo, Japan	Won vacant WBC Youth light-flyweight title
4	Win	4–0	Takashi Omae	TKO	4 (8), 0:59	10 Aug 2015	Korakuen Hall, Tokyo, Japan	
3	Win	3–0	Katsunori Nagamine	TKO	7 (8), 1:40	26 Mar 2015	Korakuen Hall, Tokyo, Japan	
2	Win	2–0	Phunwanai Wor Surapol	TKO	2 (8), 1:01	19 Oct 2014	KBS Hall, Kyoto, Japan	
1	Win	1–0	Heri Amol	UD	6	3 Aug 2014	IMP Hall, Osaka, Japan	

== Titles in boxing ==
=== Major world titles ===
- WBC light-flyweight champion (108 lbs) (2x)
- WBA (Unified) light-flyweight champion (108 lbs)
- WBA flyweight champion (112 lbs)
- WBC flyweight champion (112 lbs)
- WBO junior-bantamweight champion (115 lbs)

=== The Ring magazine titles ===
- The Ring light-flyweight champion (108 lbs)

=== Regional/International titles ===
- Japanese light-flyweight champion (108 lbs)
- OPBF light-flyweight champion (108 lbs)
- WBC Youth light-flyweight champion (108 lbs)

== Personal life ==
On November 15, 2020, Teraji was involved in a drunk driving incident, during which he drove into another persons property and crashed into a vehicle parked there. He would later issue a public apology to the victim and his fans. As a result of this incident, the Japanese Boxing Commission suspended him for three months, issued a ¥3 million fine, and ordered him to perform between 48 and 200 hours community service.

== See also ==
- List of male boxers
- Boxing in Japan
- List of Japanese boxing world champions
- List of boxing triple champions
- List of world light-flyweight boxing champions
- List of world flyweight boxing champions
- List of world super-flyweight boxing champions

Sporting positions
Regional boxing titles
Vacant Title last held by Jakrawut Majungoen	WBC Youth light-flyweight champion 12 October 2015 – 7 September 2016; Vacated	Vacant Title next held by Ryoya Ikema
Preceded by Kenichi Horikawa	Japanese light-flyweight champion 27 December 2015 – 21 March 2017; Vacated	Vacant Title next held by Tetsuya Hisada
Vacant Title last held by Jonathan Taconing	OPBF light-flyweight champion 7 August 2016 – 20 May 2017; Won world title	Vacant Title next held by Edward Heno
World boxing titles
Preceded by Ganigan López	WBC light-flyweight champion 20 May 2017 – 22 September 2021	Succeeded by Masamichi Yabuki
Preceded by Masamichi Yabuki	WBC light-flyweight champion 19 March 2022 – 15 July 2024; Vacated	Vacant Title next held by Panya Pradabsri
Preceded by Hiroto Kyoguchi	WBA light-flyweight champion Unified title 1 November 2022 – 15 July 2024; Super title until 30 November 2022; Vacated	Vacant Title next held by René Santiago
Preceded by Hiroto Kyoguchi	The Ring light-flyweight champion 1 November 2022 – 14 October 2024; Vacated	Vacant
Vacant Title last held by Julio Cesar Martínez	WBC flyweight champion 13 October 2024 – 30 July 2025	Succeeded by Ricardo Sandoval
Preceded by Seigo Yuri Akui	WBA flyweight champion 13 March – 30 July 2025	Succeeded by Ricardo Sandoval
Vacant Title last held by Jesse Rodriguez	WBO junior-bantamweight champion 20 July 2026 – present	Incumbent
