= Yu Kimura =

Yu Kimura may refer to:

- Yu Kimura (boxer) (木村 悠, born 1983), Japanese boxer
- Yu Kimura (footballer) (木村 裕, born 1994), Japanese footballer
