= Ryuya Yamanaka =

Japanese boxer (born 1995)

Personal information
- Nationality: Japanese
- Born: 山中竜也; April 11, 1995 (age 31) Mihara, Osaka, Japan
- Height: 5 ft 4 in (163 cm)
- Weight: Mini-flyweight; Light-flyweight; Flyweight

Boxing career
- Reach: 66 1/2 in (169 cm)
- Stance: Orthodox

Boxing record
- Total fights: 24
- Wins: 20
- Win by KO: 7
- Losses: 4

Ryuya Yamanaka (山中 竜也, Yamanaka Ryūya; born April 11, 1995) is a Japanese professional boxer who held the WBO mini-flyweight title from 2017 to 2018.

== Background ==
Yamanaka took up boxing in the sixth grade of elementary school, after having read a boxing manga called Hajime no Ippo. In the second year of junior high school, Yamanaka began training at Hozumi Hasegawa's gym. His younger brother Daiki Yamanaka and younger sister Sumire Yamanaka are both professional boxers as well.

== Professional career ==
=== Early career ===
Yamanaka made his professional debut against Kazuki Koyanagi on 22 June 2012. He won the fight by unanimous decision, with all three judges scoring the fight 40–36 in his favor. Yamanaka amassed a 6–1 record during the next two years, before being booked to face Hiroki Yamamoto in his first eight round bout on 6 April 2014. He won the fight by unanimous decision, with scores of 80–73, 80–73 and 80–74. This victory extended Yamanaka's winning streak to three fights, which earned him a fight against the #3 ranked OPBF minimumweight contender Roque Lauro on 22 August 2014. He lost the fight by split decision, with scores of 78–75, 75–77 and 76–77.

Yamanaka bounced back from his second professional loss with five consecutive wins, most notably beating Ronelle Ferreras by unanimous decision. This winning streak earned Yamanaka the right to face the former WBO mini flyweight champion Merlito Sabillo for the vacant OPBF mini flyweight title on 11 November 2016. He won the first twelve-round bout of his career and his first title fight by unanimous decision, with scores of 118–110, 117–111 and 119–109.

Yamanaka vacated the OPBF title on 1 February 2017, after just four months as champion. Masato Yamashita, chairman of Shinsei Gym where Yamanaka trained at that point, stated: "I want Yamanaka to fight for a world title next". On 18 March 2017, the WBO ranked Yamanaka as their #1 mini flyweight contender.

=== WBO mini flyweight champion ===
==== Yamanaka vs. Fukuhara ====
On 19 June 2017, it was announced that Yamanaka would challenge his countryman Tatsuya Fukuhara for the WBO mini flyweight title, in what was Fukuhara's first title defense and his first fight as the undisputed champion. The title bout was booked as the main event of a card which took place at the Shiroyama Sky Dome in Ashikita, Japan on 27 August 2017. Yamanaka won the fight by unanimous decision. Two of the judges scored the bout 115–113 for Yamanaka, while the third judge scored the bout 116–112 in his favor.

==== Yamanaka vs. Calleros ====
Yamanaka made his first title defense against the one-time WBO interim mini flyweight title challenger Moises Calleros on 18 March 2018, at the Portopia Hotel on Kobe, Japan. Calleros' previous title fight was against Tatsuya Fukuhara, who Yamanaka beat to win the WBO title. Yamanaka won the fight by an eight-round stoppage, as Calleros' corner chose to retire their fighter at the end of the round. He was up on points at the time of the stoppage, with two scorecards of 80–72 and one scorecard of 78–74.

==== Yamanaka vs. Saludar ====
Yamanaka made his second title defense against the #3 ranked WBO mini flyweight contender Vic Saludar. The fight was scheduled for 13 July 2018, and was contested at the Central Gym in Kobe, Japan. He lost the fight by unanimous decision, with scores of 116-111, 117-110 and 115-112. Saludar knocked Yamanaka with a straight right in the seventh round and had, by the end of the bout, opened a cut above Yamanaka's left eye. Yamanaka announced his retirement from boxing at age 23 after being diagnosed with bleeding on the brain following his decision loss to Vic Saludar. According to the rules of the Japan Boxing Commission, athletes who were found to have intracranial hemorrhage would have their licenses automatically expired, which would have prevented Yamanaka from competing domestically as well.

=== Return from retirement ===
On 9 December 2021, the Japanese Boxing Commission revised their rules to allow fighters who were diagnosed with intracranial hemorrhage to compete again, if they were cleared to do so by a physician. Ten days later, Yamanaka announced he would return to professional competition. He was booked to face Daisuke Sudo on 6 March 2022, in a light flyweight bout. Yamanaka won the fight by a fifth-round technical knockout.

Yamanaka moved up another weight-class in order to face the #15 ranked WBO flyweight contender Jonathan Taconing next. The bout was scheduled as the main event of the "REAL SPIRITS.81", which took place on 14 August 2022, at the Central Gym in Kobe, Japan. Although initially scheduled as a ten round bout, the fight duration was later changed to eight rounds. Yamanaka won the fight by unanimous decision.

Yamanaka faced the #3 ranked WBO Asia Pacific light flyweight contender Kosuke Ando for the vacant WBO AP title in the main event of "2nd WHO's NEXT", which took place on 6 May 2023 at the Korakuen Hall in Tokyo, Japan. He won the fight by unanimous decision, with scores of 120–107, 117–110 and 118–109. Yamanaka made his first title defense against Jayson Vayson on December 17, 2023. He lost the fight by a second-round technical knockout.

== Professional boxing record ==
24 fights	20 wins	4 losses
By knockout	7	2
By decision	13	2

No.	Result	Record	Opponent	Type	Round, time	Date	Location	Notes
24	Win	20–4	Puriwat Taosuwan	KO	2 (8), 1:06	23 Jun 2024	Prefectural Gymnasium, Osaka, Japan	
23	Loss	19–4	Jayson Vayson	TKO	2 (12), 1:14	17 Dec 2023	Portopia Hotel, Kobe, Japan	Lost WBO Asia Pacific light flyweight title
22	Win	19–3	Kosuke Ando	UD	12	6 May 2023	Korakuen Hall, Tokyo, Japan	Won vacant WBO Asia Pacific light flyweight title
21	Win	18–3	Jonathan Taconing	UD	8	14 Aug 2022	Central Gym, Kobe, Japan	
20	Win	17–3	Daisuke Sudo	TKO	5 (6), 1:52	6 Mar 2022	Central Gym, Kobe, Japan	
19	Loss	16–3	Vic Saludar	UD	12	13 Jul 2018	Central Gym, Kobe, Japan	Lost WBO mini-flyweight title
18	Win	16–2	Moises Calleros	RTD	8 (12), 3:00	18 Mar 2018	Portopia Hotel, Kobe, Japan	Retained WBO mini-flyweight title
17	Win	15–2	Tatsuya Fukuhara	UD	12	27 Aug 2017	Shiroyama Sky Dome, Ashikita, Japan	Won WBO mini-flyweight title
16	Win	14–2	Khanongmek Sithkrukong	KO	1 (8), 1:39	12 Mar 2017	Central Gym, Kobe, Japan	
15	Win	13–2	Merlito Sabillo	UD	12	11 Nov 2016	Central Gym, Kobe, Japan	Won vacant OPBF mini-flyweight title
14	Win	12–2	Thoedkiad Weerachon	TKO	3 (8), 1:23	16 May 2016	Central Gym, Kobe, Japan	
13	Win	11–2	Ryo Narizuka	UD	8	11 Dec 2015	Central Gym, Kobe, Japan	
12	Win	10–2	Yoshinori Wakahara	UD	10	2 Aug 2015	Prefectural Gymnasium, Osaka, Japan	
11	Win	9–2	Ronelle Ferreras	UD	8	29 Apr 2015	Sangyo Shinko Center, Sakai, Japan	
10	Win	8–2	Takahiro Murai	UD	8	7 Dec 2014	IMP Hall, Osaka, Japan	
9	Loss	7–2	Roque Lauro	SD	8	22 Aug 2014	Central Gym, Kobe, Japan	
8	Win	7–1	Hiroki Yamamoto	UD	8	6 Apr 2014	Bunka Center, Mimasaka, Japan	
7	Win	6–1	Junya Nishikawa	UD	6	22 Sep 2013	Shingu Fureai Welfare Hall, Tatsuno, Japan	
6	Win	5–1	Masaki Hirai	TKO	4 (6), 1:57	12 Jul 2013	Central Gym, Kobe, Japan	
5	Loss	4–1	Kenta Shimizu	KO	1 (4), 2:22	21 Apr 2013	Abeno Ward Center, Osaka, Japan	
4	Win	4–0	Takayuki Teraji	TKO	2 (4), 2:36	17 Feb 2013	Kippy Mall, Sanda, Japan	
3	Win	3–0	Junpei Omori	UD	4	2 Nov 2012	Central Gym, Kobe, Japan	
2	Win	2–0	Kenta Yokoe	UD	4	15 Sep 2012	Congress Center, Nagoya, Japan	
1	Win	1–0	Kazuki Koyanagi	UD	4	22 Jun 2012	Central Gym, Kobe, Japan	

== See also ==
- List of Mini-flyweight boxing champions
- List of Japanese boxing world champions

Sporting positions
World boxing titles
Preceded by Tatsuya Fukuhara	WBO minimumweight champion August 27, 2017 – July 13, 2018	Succeeded by Vic Saludar
