= Vince Paras =

Filipino boxer (born 1998)

Personal information
- Nickname: J-Vince Hunter
- Nationality: Filipino
- Born: Vince Asuncion Paras; October 13, 1998 (age 28) General Santos, Cotabato del Sur, Philippines
- Height: 1.59 m (5 ft 3 in)
- Weight: Mini-flyweight; Light-flyweight; Flyweight; Super-flyweight

Boxing career
- Reach: 164 cm (65 in)
- Stance: Orthodox

Boxing record
- Total fights: 32
- Wins: 26
- Win by KO: 19
- Losses: 5
- Draws: 1

Vince Asuncion Paras (born 13 October 1998) is a Filipino professional boxer. He challenged for the IBF mini-flyweight title in 2018 and IBO super-flyweight title in 2025.

== Early life ==
Born on 13 October 1998, at General Santos, Paras had a passion for boxing since he was little, he also idolizes Manny Pacquiao and aspires to achieve greatness like Pacquiao, stating: "I really love boxing. I have loved boxing since I was a little boy, when I would keep punching a boxing bag placed under a guava tree.", Paras was also poor, earning only $10 per amateur bout, he also used to punch a boxing bag that is wrapped by a discarded tyre around a coconut tree, his speedballs are suspended in hard wood and his gloves are "hand-me-own" gloves, he also worked on odd-jobs including scavenging.

He went amateur and won several fights before catching the eyes and interests of the legendary coach/trainer Freddie Roach, who after seeing Paras hanging outside his ward's upmarket gym was amazed and took Paras in for a few training sessions, gave him some equipment, advised him to finish high school and get off the streets of General Santos.

On 13 June 2017, Roach with Pacquiao reunited with Paras whilst Pacquiao was training and Paras brought a smile to Roach's face after he showed him the WBO Asia Pacific Youth title he won recently and was congratulated.

== Professional career ==
=== Mini flyweight ===
==== Debut ====
On 11 June 2015, Paras made his debut against compatriot and fellow debutant Romeo Garde at Robinson's Mall Atrium in General Santos where he finished Garde in the 1:31 mark of the first round.

On 23 August 2015, Paras defeated debutant Tony Pagunawan via third round TKO.

=== Light flyweight ===
For this third fight, Paras went to the light-flyweight division and defeated veteran Saddam Barambangan.

==== Paras vs. Haya ====
After amassing a record of 10–0, Paras fought his first titled bout on 10 June 2017 at Mandaue, where he fought Jimboy Haya in a 10-rounder clash for the vacant WBO Asia Pacific Youth, although the belt was a minor title, it was significant for Paras, he won unanimously in all judges, with the ringside officials all scoring: 96–93.

=== Return to mini flyweight ===
==== Paras vs. Kyoguchi I ====
After remaining undefeated, amassing a record of 13–0, Paras took on Hiroto Kyoguchi for his IBF mini-flyweight title at Ota City General Gymnasium, Tokyo, Japan. He lost by unanimous decision.

=== Return to light-flyweight ===
==== Paras vs. Taconing ====
In an attempt to gain a world-title shot at light-flyweight, Paras fought fellow world-ranked Filipino, #1 WBC ranked, Jonathan Taconing, for his WBC International light-flyweight belt at Elorde Sports Complex on 22 September 2018, Taconing would prevailed by unanimous decision.

=== Flyweight ===
==== Signed to Sanman Promotions ====
Paras signed a promotional deal with Sanman Promotions in 2021.

Paras defeated Reymark Taday by third round corner retirement on 5 February 2022, which was his first bout since September 2019.

==== Paras vs. Paradero I ====
Paras fought WBA (Regular) and WBA (Super) mini-flyweight title challenger, Robert Paradero, in a 110 pounds catchweight bout in Sanman Promotions' "Bubble Series" IX on 26 April 2022. The fight ended in a split draw with judges scoring respectively: 96-94 Paradero, 98-92 Paras and 95-95 even.

On 24 August 2022, Paras took on Jovanie Tagusi and won via first round corner retirement.

==== Paras vs. Paradero II ====
Despite both of them bowing to not have a rematch, they still made a rematch in 9 Oct 2022 at BF Homes Gym, Parañaque, Philippines for the vacant WBA Asia South Flyweight title, Paras won via unanimous decision.

Paras fought Ayumu Hanada on 13 May 2023 at Okada Manila and won via unanimous decision. After being announced as the winner, Paras made a unique move of hugging the round girl.

==== Paras vs. Ishizawa ====
On 12 October 2023, Paras fought Kai Ishizawa at Ariake Arena, Tokyo, He won via split decision. Paras later hugged the round girl again after prevailing.

==== Paras vs. Kyoguchi II ====
Paras would try to redeem his loss to Kyoguchi in a rematch at Incheon, South Korea, on 11 May 2024. Paras won via unanimous decision. He again continued his tradition by embracing the round girl after victory.

==== Paras vs. Thawornkham ====
With the vacant IBF Pan Pacific super-flyweight title up for grabs, Paras faced Sarawut Thawornkham at Venue 88 in General Santos City, Phillipnes, on 29 June 2025. He won by stoppage in the fourth round.

==== Paras vs. Malajika ====
Paras challenged IBO super-flyweight champion Ricardo Malajika at Emperors Palace in Kempton Park, South Africa, on 29 November 2025, losing via unanimous decision.

== Professional boxing record ==
| 32 fights | 26 wins | 5 losses |
|---|---|---|
| By knockout | 19 | 0 |
| By decision | 7 | 5 |
| Draws | 1 | |

| No. | Result | Record | Opponent | Type | Round, time | Date | Location | Notes |
|---|---|---|---|---|---|---|---|---|
| 32 | Win | 26–5–1 | Ramel Antaran | UD | 6 | 23 Aug 2026 | Villa Kristen Hotel and Resort, General Santos, Philippines | |
| 31 | Loss | 25–5–1 | Aoi Yokoyama | UD | 8 | 6 Jun 2026 | Aichi Sky Expo, Tokoname, Japan | |
| 30 | Win | 25–4–1 | Jaysever Abcede | TKO | 2 (8), 1:43 | 26 Feb 2026 | Villa Kristen Resort and Hotel, General Santos, Philippines | |
| 29 | Loss | 24–4–1 | Ricardo Malajika | UD | 12 | 29 Nov 2025 | Emperors Palace, Kempton Park, South Africa | For IBO super-flyweight title |
| 28 | Win | 24–3–1 | Sarawut Thawornkham | TKO | 4 (10), 1:59 | 29 Jun 2025 | Venue 88, General Santos, Philippines | Won vacant IBF Pan Pacific super-flyweight title |
| 27 | Win | 23–3–1 | Mohammed Shamim | TKO | 3 (6), 2:47 | 16 Feb 2025 | Arena Larkin, Johor Bahru, Malaysia | |
| 26 | Win | 22–3–1 | Anthony Gilbuela | TKO | 3 (8) | 16 Dec 2024 | Bula Gymnasium, General Santos, Philippines | |
| 25 | Loss | 21–3–1 | Hiroto Kyoguchi | MD | 10 | 13 Oct 2024 | Yokohama Budokan, Yokohama, Japan | |
| 24 | Win | 21–2–1 | Hiroto Kyoguchi | UD | 10 | 11 May 2024 | Paradise City Plaza, Incheon, South Korea | |
| 23 | Win | 20–2–1 | Kai Ishizawa | SD | 8 | 12 Oct 2023 | Ariake Arena, Tokyo, Japan | |
| 22 | Win | 19–2–1 | Ayumu Hanada | UD | 8 | 13 May 2023 | Okada Manila, Parañaque, Philippines | |
| 21 | Win | 18–2–1 | Robert Paradero | UD | 12 | 9 Oct 2022 | BF Homes Gym, Parañaque, Philippines | Won vacant WBA Asia South flyweight title |
| 20 | Win | 17–2–1 | Jovanie Tagusi | RTD | 1 (8) | 24 Aug 2022 | Sanman Gym, General Santos, Philippines | |
| 19 | Draw | 16–2–1 | Robert Paradero | SD | 10 | 26 Apr 2022 | Sanman Gym, General Santos, Philippines | |
| 18 | Win | 16–2 | Reymark Taday | RTD | 3 (8), 3:00 | 5 Feb 2022 | Sanman Gym, General Santos, Philippines | |
| 17 | Win | 15–2 | Vincent Bautista | RTD | 2 (6) | 20 Sep 2019 | Mandaluyong City Hall Grounds, Mandaluyong, Philippines | |
| 16 | Win | 14–2 | Reymark Taday | TKO | 5 (10) | 30 Apr 2019 | Robinson's Mall Atrium, General Santos, Philippines | |
| 15 | Loss | 13–2 | Jonathan Taconing | UD | 12 | 22 Sep 2018 | Elorde Sports Complex, Parañaque, Philippines | For WBC International light-flyweight title |
| 14 | Loss | 13–1 | Hiroto Kyoguchi | UD | 12 | 20 May 2018 | Ota City General Gymnasium, Tokyo, Japan | For IBF mini-flyweight title |
| 13 | Win | 13–0 | Aldren Moreno | KO | 7 (8), 1:50 | 17 Dec 2017 | Robinson's Mall Atrium, General Santos, Philippines | |
| 12 | Win | 12–0 | Marlou Sandoval | KO | 1 (10), 1:38 | 30 Aug 2017 | Barangay Bulua Covered Court, Cagayan de Oro, Philippines | |
| 11 | Win | 11–0 | Jimboy Haya | UD | 10 | 10 Jun 2017 | Mandaue City Sports and Cultural Complex, Barangay Centro, Mandaue, Philippines | Won vacant WBO Asia Pacific Youth light-flyweight title |
| 10 | Win | 10–0 | Michael Camelion | KO | 1 (10), 2:18 | 1 Mar 2017 | Barangay Bulua Covered Court, Cagayan de Oro, Philippines | |
| 9 | Win | 9–0 | Jeffrey Alejandre | RTD | 2 (8), 3:00 | 17 Dec 2016 | Robinsons GenSan, General Santos, Philippines | |
| 8 | Win | 8–0 | Nestor Languido | TKO | 2 (8), 1:16 | 16 Oct 2016 | Barangay Poblacion Covered Court, Iligan, Philippines | |
| 7 | Win | 7–0 | Mervin Lulu | TKO | 6 (6), 2:17 | 23 Aug 2016 | Kidapawan City Gymnasium, Barangay Amas, Kidapawan, Philippines | |
| 6 | Win | 6–0 | Jhonny Belo | KO | 1 (6), 0:48 | 19 Jun 2016 | Maasim Municipal Gymnasium, Maasim, Philippines | |
| 5 | Win | 5–0 | Briel Ozaraga | KO | 1 (6), 1:03 | 2 Apr 2016 | Oval Plaza Gym, General Santos, Philippines | |
| 4 | Win | 4–0 | Jayson Daming | UD | 6 | 14 Nov 2015 | Maasim Municipal Gymnasium, Maasim, Philippines | |
| 3 | Win | 3–0 | Saddam Barambangan | RTD | 4 (6), 3:00 | 26 Sep 2015 | Gaisano Mall Atrium of General Santos City, General Santos, Philippines | |
| 2 | Win | 2–0 | Tony Pagunawan | TKO | 3 (4), 1:56 | 23 Aug 2015 | BS Gym (Durian St.), Barangay Maranding, Lala, Philippines | |
| 1 | Win | 1–0 | Romeo Garde | TKO | 1 (4), 1:31 | 11 Jul 2015 | Robinson's Mall Atrium, General Santos, Philippines | |
