= Anthony Olascuaga =

American boxer (born 1999)

Personal information
- Nickname: Princesa ("Princess")
- Born: January 1, 1999 (age 27) Los Angeles, California, U.S.
- Height: 5 ft 5 1/2 in (166 cm)
- Weight: Light flyweight; Flyweight

Boxing career
- Reach: 66 1/2 in (169 cm)
- Stance: Orthodox

Boxing record
- Total fights: 14
- Wins: 13
- Win by KO: 9
- Losses: 1

Anthony Olascuaga (born January 1, 1999), is an American professional boxer. He has held the World Boxing Organization (WBO) flyweight title since July 2024.

== Professional career ==
Olascuaga turned professional in 2020 and compiled a record of 5–0 before facing unified light-flyweight world champion Kenshiro Teraji at the Ariake Arena in Tokyo, Japan, on 8 April 2023, losing via ninth-round stoppage.

At the same venue, he got back to winning ways in his next fight, stopping Giemel Magramo in the seventh round on 18 September 2023.

Next Olascuaga received another shot at becoming a world champion, knocking out Riku Kano in the third round at Ryōgoku Kokugikan in Tokyo, Japan, to win the vacant WBO flyweight title on 20 July 2024.

He made his first defense against Jonathan González at Ariake Arena in Tokyo, Japan, on 14 October 2024. The fight ended in unusual circumstances when his opponent refused to continue the bout after suffering a cut due to a clash of heads in the first round. Initially ruled a no contest, the result of the fight was changed to a technical knockout win for Olascuaga two weeks later.

Olascuaga's second title defense was a unanimous decision success over Hiroto Kyoguchi at Ryōgoku Kokugikan in Tokyo on 13 March 2025.

He stopped Juan Carlos Camacho Jr. in the second round at Fontainebleau Las Vegas in Winchester, Nevada, United States, on 11 September 2025, to retain his title for a third time.

Making the fourth defense of his title, Olascuaga defeated Taku Kuwahara via fourth-round technical knockout at Ryōgoku Kokugikan in Tokyo, Japan, on 17 December 2025.

Olascuaga made the fifth defense of his WBO flyweight title against Jukiya Iimura on March 15, 2026, at Yokohama Buntai in Yokohama, Japan. He won the fight by knockout in the ninth round.

Olascuaga was scheduled to make a defense of his WBO flyweight title against Andy Dominguez at Civic Center Plaza in San Francisco on July 11, 2026. The fight was canceled due in June 2026 due to logistical concerns of staging a free event outdoor event.

On November 14, 2026, Olascuaga defeated Yuberjen Martinez via unanimous decision at Dignity Health Sports Park in Carson, California, United States, to retain his title for a sixth time.

== Personal life ==
Before focusing full-time on boxing, Olascuaga worked as an Uber driver and a barber.

== Professional boxing record ==
| 14 fights | 13 wins | 1 loss |
|---|---|---|
| By knockout | 9 | 1 |
| By decision | 4 | 0 |

| No. | Result | Record | Opponent | Type | Round, time | Date | Location | Notes |
|---|---|---|---|---|---|---|---|---|
| 14 | Win | 13–1 | Yuberjen Martinez | UD | 12 | Nov 14, 2026 | Dignity Health Sports Park, Carson, California, U.S | Retained WBO flyweight title |
| 13 | Win | 12–1 | Jukiya Iimura | TKO | 9 (12), 1:12 | Mar 15, 2026 | Yokohama Buntai, Yokohama, Japan | Retained WBO flyweight title |
| 12 | Win | 11–1 | Taku Kuwahara | TKO | 4 (12), 2:33 | Dec 17, 2025 | Ryōgoku Kokugikan, Tokyo, Japan | Retained WBO flyweight title |
| 11 | Win | 10–1 | Juan Carlos Camacho Jr. | TKO | 2 (12), 2:33 | Sep 11, 2025 | Fontainebleau Las Vegas, Winchester, Nevada, U.S. | Retained WBO flyweight title |
| 10 | Win | 9–1 | Hiroto Kyoguchi | UD | 12 | Mar 13, 2025 | Ryōgoku Kokugikan, Tokyo, Japan | Retained WBO flyweight title |
| 9 | Win | 8–1 | Jonathan González | TKO | 1 (12), 2:25 | Oct 14, 2024 | Ariake Arena, Tokyo, Japan | Retained WBO flyweight title; González quit after accidental headbutt |
| 8 | Win | 7–1 | Riku Kano | KO | 3 (12), 2:50 | Jul 20, 2024 | Ryōgoku Kokugikan, Tokyo, Japan | Won vacant WBO flyweight title |
| 7 | Win | 6–1 | Giemel Magramo | TKO | 7 (8), 2:57 | Sep 18, 2023 | Ariake Arena, Tokyo, Japan | |
| 6 | Loss | 5–1 | Kenshiro Teraji | TKO | 9 (12), 0:58 | Apr 8, 2023 | Ariake Arena, Tokyo, Japan | For WBA (Super), WBC, and The Ring light flyweight titles |
| 5 | Win | 5–0 | Marco Sustaita | TKO | 1 (10), 2:47 | Oct 14, 2022 | Seneca Niagara Casino & Hotel, Niagara Falls, New York, U.S. | Retained WBA Fedelatin flyweight title |
| 4 | Win | 4–0 | Gustavo Perez Alvarez | RTD | 6 (8), 3:00 | May 13, 2022 | Seneca Niagara Casino & Hotel, Niagara Falls, New York, U.S. | |
| 3 | Win | 3–0 | Gilberto Pedroza | UD | 8 | Mar 12, 2022 | Roberto Durán Arena, Panama City, Panama | Won vacant WBA Fedelatin flyweight title |
| 2 | Win | 2–0 | Saúl Juárez | UD | 6 | Aug 13, 2021 | Osceola Heritage Park, Kissimmee, Florida, U.S. | |
| 1 | Win | 1–0 | Edwin Reyes | TKO | 2 (6), 1:55 | Sep 4, 2020 | Osceola Heritage Park, Kissimmee, Florida, U.S. | |

== See also ==
- List of male boxers
- List of Mexican boxing world champions
- List of world flyweight boxing champions

Sporting positions
Regional boxing titles
| Vacant Title last held by Angel Ramos Serrano | WBA Fedelatin flyweight champion March 12, 2022 – 2023; Vacated | Vacant Title next held by Leandro Jose Blanc |
World boxing titles
| Vacant Title last held by Jesse Rodriguez | WBO flyweight champion July 20, 2024 – present | Incumbent |
