= Ricardo Malajika =

South African boxer (born 1998)

Personal information
- Nickname: Magic Man
- Born: 28 August 1998 (age 28) Johannesburg, Gauteng, South Africa
- Weight: Flyweight; Super-flyweight

Boxing career
- Stance: Orthodox

Boxing record
- Total fights: 20
- Wins: 18
- Win by KO: 12
- Losses: 2

Ricardo Malajika (born 28 August 1998) is a South African professional boxer who has held the World Boxing Council (WBC) super-flyweight title since September 2026 and the International Boxing Organization (IBO) super-flyweight title since September 2023. He previously held the IBO flyweight title in 2025.

== Career ==
Malajika made his professional debut at Emperors Palace, Kempton Park, South Africa, on 21 October 2018, knocking out Nkululeko Mnisi in the first of their scheduled four-round contest.

At the same venue, he claimed the vacant IBO super-flyweight title with a unanimous decision win over Kevin Luis Munoz on 2 September 2023.

Malajika successfully defended his title with wins over Marcel Braithwaite via unanimous decision on 5 April 2024, and Yanga Sigqibo by 11th round stoppage on 23 August 2024.

Moving down a weight division and again at Emperors Palace, he challenged IBO flyweight champion Jackson Chauke on 1 March 2025. Malajika became a two-weight title holder when he stopped his opponent in the second round.

Once more at Emperors Palace, he defended his super-flyweight title for the third time against Jayson Mama on 9 August 2025. He knocked his opponent to the canvas five times before the fight was stopped in the fifth round.

Again at the same venue, Malajika retained his super-flyweight championship for the fourth time on 29 November 2025, defeating Vince Paras by unanimous decision.

Fighting outside of South Africa for the first time in his professional career, Malajika defeated the previously unbeaten Tomoya Tsuboi via split decision to win the vacant WBC super-flyweight title at Toyota Arena in Tokyo, Japan, on 27 September 2026. Two of the ringside judges scored the bout 116–112 and 115–113 respectively in his favour, while the third had it 115–113 for his opponent.

== Personal life ==
Malajika's younger brother Charlton is also a professional boxer.

== Professional boxing record ==
| 20 fights | 18 wins | 2 losses |
|---|---|---|
| By knockout | 12 | 0 |
| By decision | 6 | 2 |

| No. | Result | Record | Opponent | Type | Round, time | Date | Location | Notes |
|---|---|---|---|---|---|---|---|---|
| 20 | Win | 18–2 | Tomoya Tsuboi | SD | 12 | 27 Sep 2026 | Toyota Arena Tokyo, Tokyo, Japan | Won vacant WBC super-flyweight title |
| 19 | Win | 17–2 | Vince Paras | UD | 12 | 29 Nov 2025 | Emperors Palace, Kempton Park, South Africa | Retained IBO super-flyweight title |
| 18 | Win | 16–2 | Jayson Mama | TKO | 5 (12), 1:09 | 9 Aug 2025 | Emperors Palace, Kempton Park, South Africa | Retained IBO super-flyweight title |
| 17 | Win | 15–2 | Jackson Chauke | KO | 2 (12) | 1 Mar 2025 | Emperors Palace, Kempton Park, South Africa | Won IBO flyweight title |
| 16 | Win | 14–2 | Yanga Sigqibo | KO | 11 (12) | 23 Aug 2024 | Emperors Palace, Kempton Park, South Africa | Retained IBO super-flyweight title |
| 15 | Win | 13–2 | Marcel Braithwaite | UD | 12 | 5 Apr 2024 | Emperors Palace, Kempton Park, South Africa | Retained IBO super-flyweight title |
| 14 | Win | 12–2 | Kevin Luis Muñoz | UD | 12 | 2 Sep 2023 | Emperors Palace, Kempton Park, South Africa | Won vacant IBO super-flyweight title |
| 13 | Win | 11–2 | Adrian Lerasan | TKO | 5 (10) | 18 Mar 2023 | Emperors Palace, Kempton Park, South Africa | |
| 12 | Win | 10–2 | Sihle Jelwana | TKO | 8 (8) | 10 Dec 2022 | Emperors Palace, Kempton Park, South Africa | |
| 11 | Win | 9–2 | Arnel Lubisi | TKO | 2 (6) | 17 Sep 2022 | Emperors Palace, Kempton Park, South Africa | |
| 10 | Loss | 8–2 | Sikho Nqothole | UD | 8 | 9 Apr 2022 | Superbowl, Sun City, South Africa | |
| 9 | Win | 8–1 | Khayalethu Mbedje | KO | 1 (8) | 25 Sep 2021 | Emperors Palace, Kempton Park, South Africa | |
| 8 | Loss | 7–1 | Sabelo Ngebinyana | SD | 8 | 14 Mar 2021 | Emperors Palace, Kempton Park, South Africa | |
| 7 | Win | 7–0 | Rofhiwa Nemushungwa | UD | 10 | 19 Dec 2020 | Emperors Palace, Kempton Park, South Africa | |
| 6 | Win | 6–0 | Mnqobi Mqhize | TKO | 8 (10), 1:31 | 30 Nov 2019 | Emperors Palace, Kempton Park, South Africa | |
| 5 | Win | 5–0 | Layten Gloss | TKO | 6 (10), 1:53 | 23 Aug 2019 | Emperors Palace, Kempton Park, South Africa | |
| 4 | Win | 4–0 | Arnel Lubisi | KO | 1 (6) | 8 Jun 2019 | Emperors Palace, Kempton Park, South Africa | |
| 3 | Win | 3–0 | Andile Cindi | UD | 6 | 24 Feb 2019 | Emperors Palace, Kempton Park, South Africa | |
| 2 | Win | 2–0 | Tebogo Makwala | TKO | 1 (4), 2:29 | 8 Dec 2018 | Emperors Palace, Kempton Park, South Africa | |
| 1 | Win | 1–0 | Nkululeko Minso | KO | 1 (4) | 21 Oct 2018 | Emperors Palace, Kempton Park, South Africa | |

Sporting positions
World boxing titles
| Vacant Title last held by Jesse Rodriguez | WBC super-flyweight champion 27 September 2026 – present | Incumbent |
