= Giemel Magramo =

Filipino boxer (born 1994)

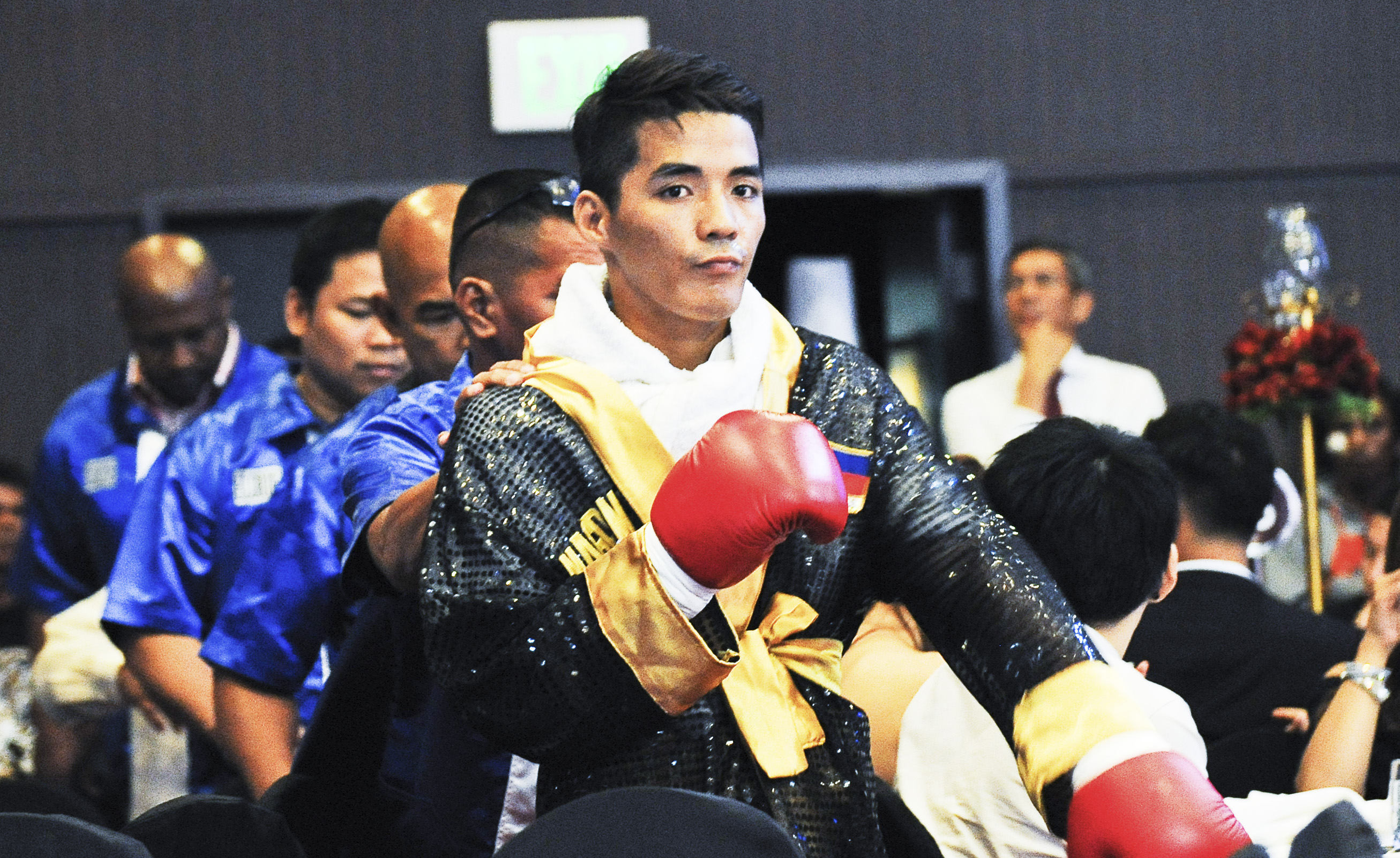
- Magramo in 2016

Personal information
- Nickname: Pistolero
- Nationality: Filipino
- Born: 5 October 1994 (age 31) Parañaque, Philippines
- Height: 163 cm (5 ft 4 in)
- Weight: Flyweight

Boxing career
- Stance: Orthodox

Boxing record
- Total fights: 35
- Wins: 30
- Win by KO: 23
- Losses: 5

Giemel Abuan Magramo (born 5 October 1994) is a Filipino professional boxer, who challenged for the WBO flyweight title in 2020. As of December 2021, he is ranked as the world's sixth best active flyweight by BoxRec, and tenth by the Transnational Boxing Rankings Board

== Early years ==
Magramo is the son of Melvin Magramo, a former Filipino professional boxer. He was introduced to boxing by his father when he was four years old and started fighting in amateur contests by age 11.

== Professional boxing career ==
Magramo faced Michael Bravo for the vacant WBO Oriental flyweight title on 25 March 2018. He won the fight by a seventh-round stoppage, as Bravo opted to retire from the bout at the end of the round. Magramo made his first title defense against Petchchorhae Kokietgym on 29 October 2018. He made short work of his over-matched opponent, winning the fight by a third-round knockout. Magramo faced the reigning WBO International flyweight titleholder Wenfeng Ge on 5 January 2019, with both titles on the line. Ge retired from the fight at the end of the tenth round. Magramo beat Richard Claveras on 7 September 2019, in his last bout of 2019, by a third-round stoppage.

Magramo was expected to face the undefeated Junto Nakatani for the vacant WBO flyweight title on 4 April 2020. Due to restrictions imposed to combat the emerging COVID-19 pandemic, the title bout was postponed and was tentatively expected to take place in June 2020. The fight was postponed again on 21 May 2020 for 4 July 2020, and was scheduled to take place at the Korakuen Hall in Tokyo, Japan. The fight was postponed for the third time two days later, for 1 August 2020, at the same venue and location. It was once again postponed in October, for 4 November 2020, when it finally took place. Nakatani won the fight by eight-round knockout. Magramo was staggered with a left hook, with a subsequent flurry of punches dropping him at the 2 minute mark of the round. Although he managed to rise in time for the ten count, he was unsteady on his feet which prompted the referee to wave the fight off.

Magramo returned to professional competition a year later, to face Jayr Raquinel for the vacant OPBF flyweight title in the main event of the 23 October 2021 Elorde card. He won the fight by unanimous decision, with scores of 118–110, 119–109, 115–113.

Magramo faced Jerry Tomogdan on 8 July 2022, in his first fight of the year. He won the fight by a third-round technical knockout.

== Professional boxing record ==
35 fights	30 wins	5 losses
By knockout	23	2
By decision	7	3

No.	Result	Record	Opponent	Type	Round, time	Date	Location	Notes
34	Loss	30–5	Aoi Yokoyama	UD	12	29 Mar 2025	Aichi Sky Expo, Tokoname, Japan	Lost OPBF super flyweight title
34	Win	30–4	Judy Flores	SD	12	20 Oct 2024	Okada Manila Hotel and Casino, Parañaque, Philippines	Won vacant OPBF super flyweight title
33	Win	29–4	Denmark Quibido	UD	12	24 Mar 2024	Okada Manila Hotel and Casino, Parañaque, Philippines	Won Philippines GAB super flyweight title
32	Loss	28–4	Anthony Olascuaga	TKO	7 (8) 1:25	18 Sep 2023	Ariake Arena, Koto-Ku, Japan	
31	Win	28–3	Phissanu Chimsunthom	TKO	6 (8) 1:25	13 May 2023	Okada Manila Hotel and Casino, Parañaque, Philippines	
30	Win	27–3	Sanchai Yotboon	TKO	2 (12), 1:28	25 Mar 2023	Okada Manila Hotel and Casino, Parañaque, Philippines	Won vacant WBO Global flyweight title
29	Loss	26–3	Taku Kuwahara	UD	12	25 Oct 2022	Korakuen Hall, Tokyo, Japan	Lost OPBF flyweight title
28	Win	26–2	Jerry Tomogdan	TKO	3 (10), 1:12	8 Jul 2022	The Flash Grand Ballroom of the Elorde Sports Complex, Parañaque, Philippines	
27	Win	25–2	Jayr Raquinel	UD	12	23 Oct 2021	The Flash Grand Ballroom of the Elorde Sports Complex, Parañaque, Philippines	Won vacant OPBF flyweight title
26	Loss	24–2	Junto Nakatani	KO	8 (12), 2:10	6 Nov 2020	Korakuen Hall, Tokyo, Japan	For vacant WBO flyweight title
25	Win	24–1	Richard Claveras	RTD	3 (8) 3:00	7 Sep 2019	Jurado Hall of the Philippine Marine Corp, Barangay Fort Bonifacio, Taguig, Philippines	
24	Win	23–1	Wenfeng Ge	RTD	10 (12) 3:00	5 Jan 2019	Suzhou Olympic Sport Center, Suzhou, China	Retained WBO Oriental flyweight title; Won WBO International flyweight title
23	Win	22–1	Petchchorhae Kokietgym	TKO	3 (12) 2:48	29 Oct 2018	Midas Hotel and Casino, Pasay, Philippines	Retained WBO Oriental flyweight title
22	Win	21–1	Michael Bravo	RTD	7 (12) 3:00	25 Mar 2018	The Flash Grand Ballroom of the Elorde Sports Complex, Parañaque, Philippines	Won vacant WBO Oriental flyweight title
21	Win	20–1	Benezer Alolod	TKO	4 (10) 2:43	16 Dec 2017	The Flash Grand Ballroom of the Elorde Sports Complex, Parañaque, Philippines	
20	Win	19–1	John Mark Apolinario	RTD	3 (8) 3:00	15 Oct 2017	The Flash Grand Ballroom of the Elorde Sports Complex, Parañaque, Philippines	
19	Win	18–1	John Rey Lauza	KO	4 (10) 2:54	28 May 2017	The Flash Grand Ballroom of the Elorde Sports Complex, Parañaque, Philippines	
18	Loss	17–1	Muhammad Waseem	UD	12	27 Nov 2016	Millennium Hilton Hotel, Seoul, South Korea	For WBC Silver flyweight title
17	Win	17–0	Rowel Rosia	UD	10	16 Jul 2016	The Flash Grand Ballroom of the Elorde Sports Complex, Parañaque, Philippines	
16	Win	16–0	John Bajawa	RTD	4 (10), 3:00	29 Mar 2016	Sofitel Plaza Hotel, Pasay, Philippines	
15	Win	15–0	Jeny Boy Boca	TKO	6 (12), 2:00	12 Dec 2015	The Flash Grand Ballroom of the Elorde Sports Complex, Parañaque, Philippines	Won vacant WBC International flyweight title
14	Win	14–0	Roilo Golez	TKO	4 (10), 1:09	12 Sep 2015	The Flash Grand Ballroom of the Elorde Sports Complex, Parañaque, Philippines	
13	Win	13–0	Jayar Estremos	TKO	2 (10), 2:42	25 Mar 2015	Manila Hotel, Manila, Philippines	
12	Win	12–0	Ruther del Castillo	RTD	4 (10), 3:00	29 Nov 2014	The Flash Grand Ballroom of the Elorde Sports Complex, Parañaque, Philippines	
11	Win	11–0	Jovel Romasasa	RTD	2 (10), 3:00	22 Aug 2014	The Flash Grand Ballroom of the Elorde Sports Complex, Parañaque, Philippines	
10	Win	10–0	Pit Anacaya	KO	3 (10), 1:15	24 May 2014	The Flash Grand Ballroom of the Elorde Sports Complex, Parañaque, Philippines	
9	Win	9–0	Rey Morano	KO	3 (8), 0:53	1 Feb 2014	The Flash Grand Ballroom of the Elorde Sports Complex, Parañaque, Philippines	
8	Win	8–0	Roy Albaera	KO	1 (8), 1:59	14 Dec 2013	The Flash Grand Ballroom of the Elorde Sports Complex, Parañaque, Philippines	
7	Win	7–0	Ricky Oyan	TKO	2 (8), 2:44	26 Oct 2013	The Flash Grand Ballroom of the Elorde Sports Complex, Parañaque, Philippines	
6	Win	6–0	Lester Abutan	UD	6	22 Jun 2013	The Flash Grand Ballroom of the Elorde Sports Complex, Parañaque, Philippines	
5	Win	5–0	Ruben Traza	UD	6	25 Mar 2013	Sofitel Plaza Hotel, Pasay, Philippines	
4	Win	4–0	Junjie Lauza	TKO	3 (6), 1:19	10 Nov 2012	The Flash Grand Ballroom of the Elorde Sports Complex, Parañaque, Philippines	
3	Win	3–0	Jupiter Benig	TKO	1 (4), 2:30	29 Sep 2012	The Flash Grand Ballroom of the Elorde Sports Complex, Parañaque, Philippines	
2	Win	2–0	Fel Morales	TKO	2 (4), 2:30	24 Jul 2012	Sofitel Plaza Hotel, Pasay, Philippines	
1	Win	1–0	Antonio Melencion	UD	4	25 Mar 2012	Dusit Thani Manila Hotel, Makati, Philippines	
