= Riku Kano =

Japanese boxer (born 1997)

Personal information
- Born: 加納陸; November 16, 1997 (age 28) Kawanishi, Hyōgo, Japan
- Height: 5 ft 4 in (163 cm)
- Weight: Mini-flyweight; Light-flyweight; Flyweight

Boxing career
- Reach: 65 1/2 in (166 cm)
- Stance: Southpaw

Boxing record
- Total fights: 29
- Wins: 22
- Win by KO: 11
- Losses: 5
- Draws: 2

Riku Kano (born 16 November 1997) is a Japanese professional boxer who challenged for the WBO mini-flyweight title in 2016. At the regional level, Kano has held the WBO Asia Pacific title at light flyweight and flyweight.

== Professional boxing career ==
=== Mini flyweight ===
==== Early career ====
Kano made his professional debut against Benjie Bartolome on 7 December 2013, and lost the fight by split decision. After suffering his first professional loss, Kano rebounded by winning four of his next five fights, with three victories coming by way of stoppage. After amassing a 4–1–1 record, Kano was scheduled to fight Madit Sada for the vacant WBA Asia minimumweight title on 9 December 2014. He won the fight by unanimous decision, with all three judges awarding him every single round of the bout.

Kano was scheduled to fight in Japan for the first time in his career on 7 June 2015, when he faced Marihot Hutajulu. He won the fight by a third-round knockout. Kano was next scheduled to face Kenta Matsui on 27 September 2015. He won the six round bout by unanimous decision, with scores of 60–56, 59–55 and 59–56. Kano beat Pigmy Kokietgym by unanimous decision on 27 December 2015.

==== World title challenge ====
Kano was scheduled to face the debuting Chaichana Sor Por Por Laos on 26 February 2016. He won the fight by a first-round knockout, stopping Chaichana after just 64 seconds. Kano faced a significant step-up in competition in his next bout, as he was faced the former WBO World mini-flyweight champion Merlito Sabillo for the interim OPBF minimumweight title. The bout was scheduled as the main event of the "Sanda to the World 7" event on 8 May 2016, at the Bunka Center in Sanda, Hyōgo. Kano won the fight by split decision. Two judges scored the fight 117–111 for Kano, while the third judge scored it 115–113 for Sabillo.

After beating Sabillo, Kano was ranked as the #1 mini-flyweight by the WBO. As such, he was scheduled to face the #2 ranked mini-flyweight contender Katsunari Takayama for the vacant WBO mini-flyweight title. The fight was scheduled for 20 August 2016, and was held at the Komagatani Gym in Sanda, Hyōgo. The bout was broadcast only by TV Osaka, and as such only boxing fans in the Kantō region were able to watch it. Kano failed to become the youngest Japanese world boxing champion, as Takayama won the fight by technical decision in the sixth round. Takayama suffered a cut above his left eye due to an accidental clash of heads in the second round, which was exacerbated as the fight went on. He had built up enough of a lead by that point however, and was awarded a unanimous decision, with scores of 59–56, 59–58 and 59–55.

==== Later mini flyweight career ====
Kano was scheduled to fight the 0–5 Thoedkiad Weerachon on 11 December 2016. He won the fight by a third–round technical knockout. Kano was next scheduled to fight the journeyman Jerry Tomogdan for the vacant WBO Asia Pacific Minimumweight title on 5 May 2017, at the Bunka Center in Sanda, Hyōgo. He suffered an upset loss, as Tomogdan won the fight by a sixth-round knockout, stopping Kano with body strikes at the 1:56 minute mark.

Kano was scheduled to fight the #8 ranked Japanese mini-flyweight contender Naoya Haruguchi in the main event of "W-ENDLESS Presents 11th from Mita to the World" on 5 November 2017, at the Sanda Hotel in Sanda, Hyōgo. He won the fight by majority decision, with scores of 79–74, 78–75 and 76–76. Kano was scheduled to face the debuting Kittisak Khamlong on 29 April 2018, on the undercard of the "1eth from Mita to the World" event. He won the fight by a first-round knockout, stopping Kittisak in 81 seconds.

Kano was scheduled to challenge the reigning Japanese mini-flyweight champion Shin Ono in the latter's first title defense. The title bout was scheduled for 24 August 2018, and was held at the Korakuen Hall in Tokyo, Japan. Ono won the fight by a technical knockout, as the referee was forced to stop the fight after Kano suffered two knockdowns in the eight round. Ono was ahead on the scorecards at the time of the stoppage, with two judges having him up 68–65, while the third judge had him at 67–66.

=== Light flyweight ===
After suffering his fourth loss at mini-flyweight, Kano moved up a weight class for his next bout. He was scheduled to face Takayuki Teraji on 2 December 2018. Kano won the fight by unanimous decision, with scores of 79–74, 79–73 and 80–74. Kano was scheduled to fight Mektison Marganti for the vacant WBC Youth World light-flyweight title on 26 May 2019. He won the fight by an eight-round knockout, after Marganti's corner threw in the towel. Kano faced the 2018 "Rookie of the Year" light-flyweight runner-up Tetsuya Mimura on 17 November 2019, in his last fight of the year. He won the fight by majority decision, with scores of 78–74, 77–76, 76–76.

Kano was scheduled to fight Ryoki Hirai for the vacant WBO Asia Pacific light-flyweight title on 23 November 2020. He won the fight by split decision. Two judges scored the fight 116–111 and 114–113 for him, while the third judge scored it 114–113 for Hirai. Kano made his first title defense against Takumi Sakae on 23 July 2021. He won the fight by a ninth-round technical knockout. Kano vacated the WBO Asia Pacific light-flyweight title on 14 February 2022.

=== Flyweight ===
Kano faced the journeyman Sanchai Yotboon in a flyweight bout on 24 April 2022, in the main event of a Taisei Promotions card, held at the EDION Arena Osaka in Osaka, Japan. He won the fight by a second-round technical knockout, due to referee stoppage. He dropped Yotboon twice prior to the stoppage, with both knockdowns coming in the second round.

After successfully debuting in a new weight class, Kano was booked to face Yuga Inoue for the vacant WBO Asia Pacific flyweight title on 3 September 2022. He captured the title by unanimous decision. Two of the judges scored the fight 115–113 for him, while the third judge scored the fight 116–112 in his favor.

Kano made his first WBO Asia Pacific flyweight title defense against Daiki Kameyama on 16 April 2023. He retained the title by a split decision draw, with two judges awarding a 115–113 card to Kano and Kameyama respectively, while the third ringside official had the fight scored as an even 114–114 draw.

=== WBO Flyweight Championship ===
Kano challenged Anthony Olascuaga for the vacant WBO flyweight title at Ryōgoku Kokugikan in Tokyo, Japan on July 20, 2024. He lost by KO in the 3rd round.

== Professional boxing record ==
29 fights	22 wins	5 losses
By knockout	11	3
By decision	11	2
Draws	2	

No.	Result	Record	Opponent	Type	Round, time	Date	Location	Notes
29	Loss	22–5–2	Anthony Olascuaga	TKO	3 (12), 2:50	20 Jul 2024	Ryōgoku Kokugikan, Tokyo, Japan	For vacant WBO flyweight title
28	Win	22–4–2	Khomsan Kaewruean	TKO	2 (8), 1:25	10 Dec 2023	EDION Arena Osaka, Osaka, Japan	
27	Win	21–4–2	Kitidech Hirunsuk	UD	10	10 Sep 2023	EDION Arena Osaka, Japan	
26	Draw	20–4–2	Daiki Kameyama	SD	12	16 Apr 2023	EDION Arena Osaka, Japan	Retained WBO Asia Pacific flyweight title
25	Win	20–4–1	Yuga Inoue	UD	12	3 Sep 2022	EDION Arena Osaka, Japan	Won vacant WBO Asia Pacific flyweight title
24	Win	19–4–1	Sanchai Yotboon	TKO	2 (8), 2:42	24 Apr 2022	EDION Arena Osaka, Japan	
23	Win	18–4–1	Takumi Sakae	TKO	9 (12), 2:12	23 Jul 2021	EDION Arena Osaka, Japan	Retained WBO Asia Pacific light-flyweight title
22	Win	17–4–1	Ryoki Hirai	SD	12	23 Nov 2020	Bunka Center, Sanda, Japan	Won vacant WBO Asia Pacific light-flyweight title
21	Win	16–4–1	Tetsuya Mimura	MD	8	17 Nov 2019	Sanda Hotel, Sanda, Japan	
20	Win	15–4–1	Mektison Marganti	KO	8 (10), 2:42	26 May 2019	Osaka City University, Osaka, Japan	Won vacant WBC Youth light-flyweight title
19	Win	14–4–1	Takayuki Teraji	UD	8	2 Dec 2018	Sanda Hotel, Sanda, Japan	
18	Loss	13–4–1	Shin Ono	TKO	8 (10), 2:46	24 Aug 2018	Korakuen Hall, Tokyo, Japan	For Japanese mini-flyweight title
17	Win	13–3–1	Kittisak Khamlong	KO	1 (8), 1:21	29 Apr 2018	Sanda Hotel, Sanda, Japan	
16	Win	12–3–1	Naoya Haruguchi	MD	8	5 Nov 2017	Sanda Hotel, Sanda, Japan	
15	Loss	11–3–1	Jerry Tomogdan	KO	6 (12), 1:56	5 May 2017	Bunka Center, Sanda, Japan	For vacant WBO Asia Pacific light-flyweight title
14	Win	11–2–1	Thoedkiad Weerachon	TKO	3 (10), 0:21	11 Dec 2016	Bunka Center, Sanda, Japan	
13	Loss	10–2–1	Katsunari Takayama	TD	6 (12), 0:58	20 Aug 2016	Komagatani Gym, Sanda, Japan	For vacant WBO mini-flyweight title
12	Win	10–1–1	Merlito Sabillo	SD	12	8 May 2016	Bunka Center, Sanda, Japan	Won OPBF interim mini-flyweight title
11	Win	9–1–1	Chaichana Sor Por Por Laos	KO	1 (8), 1:04	26 Feb 2016	Wat Kokkuod, Surin, Thailand	
10	Win	8–1–1	Wicha Phulaikhao	UD	8	27 Dec 2015	Bunka Center, Sanda, Japan	
9	Win	7–1–1	Kenta Matsui	UD	6	27 Sep 2015	EDION Arena Osaka, Osaka, Japan	
8	Win	6–1–1	Marihot Hutajulu	KO	3 (6), 1:30	7 Jun 2015	Bunka Center, Sanda, Japan	
7	Win	5–1–1	Madit Sada	UD	12	9 Dec 2014	Nonthaburi, Thailand	Won vacant WBA Asia mini-flyweight title
6	Win	4–1–1	Wittaya Sithsaithong	KO	5 (6)	14 Nov 2014	Tupatemee Air Force Stadium, Pathum Thani, Thailand	
5	Win	3–1–1	Sakadpetch Sor Kanitsorn	KO	6 (8)	12 Sep 2014	Municipality of Bangpliyai, Samut Prakan, Thailand	
4	Win	2–1–1	Mongkol Kamsommat	KO	3 (6)	10 Jul 2014	Pak Kret Pier, Pak Kret, Thailand	
3	Draw	1–1–1	Vicente Montecino	MD	4	10 May 2014	Olivarez Stadium, Paranaque City, Philippines	
2	Win	1–1	Ronnie Rejino	UD	4	22 Mar 2014	Benguet State University Gym, La Trinidad, Philippines	
1	Loss	0–1	Benjie Bartolome	SD	4	7 Dec 2013	Barangay Buayang Bato, Mandaluyong City, Philippines	
