= Tatsuya Fukuhara =

Japanese pro boxer

Tatsuya Fukuhara 福原辰弥
Personal information
- Nationality: Japanese
- Born: May 8, 1989 (age 37) Kumamoto, Japan
- Height: 5 ft 4 1/2 in (164 cm)
- Weight: Mini-flyweight

Boxing career
- Reach: 63 in (160 cm)
- Stance: Southpaw

Boxing record
- Total fights: 34
- Wins: 21
- Win by KO: 7
- Losses: 7
- Draws: 6

Tatsuya Fukuhara (福原 辰弥, Fukuhara Tatsuya; born May 8, 1989) is a Japanese professional boxer who held the WBO mini-flyweight title in 2017 and challenged twice for the WBC mini-flyweight title in 2017 and 2019.

== Professional career ==
Fukuhara made his debut on April 14, 2008, beating Katsuhiko Muranaka by majority decision. Fukuhara suffered a unanimous decision loss (55-59, 55–59, 56–59) to Takuma Inoue on the latter's debut fight. Fukuhara's record after that fight stood at 12-4-3. In September 2014, Fukuhara went to a majority draw with Fahlan Sakkreerin Jr. in Thailand. Fukuhara won the Japanese mini-flyweight title by beating Hiroya Yamamoto by unanimous decision. On his second title defense, Fukuhara drew with Shin Ono by technical draw. Fukuhara would defend the title three times before vacating it to fight for an interim world title.

On February 26, 2017, Fukuhara defeated Mexican Moises Calleros (25-6-1) via 12-round split decision to win the WBO interim mini-flyweight title. He was promoted to full champion after original champion Katsunari Takayama vacated the title upon his retirement. He lost the title in his first defense to fellow countryman Ryuya Yamanaka. Fukuhara received another title shot against WBC mini-flyweight champion Wanheng Menayothin. The fight was closely contested, and went to a decision after twelve rounds, with Wanheng winning by unanimous decision (118-110, 116–111, 117–113).

== Professional boxing record ==
34 fights	21 wins	7 losses
By knockout	7	1
By decision	14	6
Draws	6	

Result	Record	Opponent	Type	Round, time	Date	Location	Notes
Loss	21–7–6	(Thailand) Wanheng Menayothin	TD	8 (12)	May 31, 2019	City Hall, Chachoengsao, Thailand	For WBC mini-flyweight title
Win	21–6–6	(Japan) Naoya Haruguchi	UD	10	Jul 29, 2018	City Sogo Gym, Yatsushiro, Japan	
Win	20–6–6	(Japan) Yuto Takahashi	UD	8	Apr 22, 2018	Clover Plaza, Kasuga, Japan	
Loss	19–6–6	(Thailand) Wanheng Menayothin	UD	12	Nov 25, 2017	(Thailand) Nakhon Ratchasima, Isan	For WBC mini-flyweight title
Loss	19–5–6	(Japan) Ryuya Yamanaka	UD	12	Aug 27, 2017	Shiroyama Sky Dome, Ashikita, Japan	Lost WBO mini-flyweight title
Win	19–4–6	(Mexico) Moises Calleros	SD	12	Feb 26, 2017	(Japan) Matsushima Athletic Park Gym, Kami-Amakusa	Won WBO interim mini-flyweight title
Win	18–4–6	(Japan) Genki Hanai	TKO	7 (10), 0:44	Nov 3, 2016	Foodpal Kumamoto, Kumamoto, Japan	Retained Japanese mini-flyweight title
Draw	17–4–6	(Japan) Shin Ono	TD	3 (10), 1:40	Sep 19, 2016	Foodpal Kumamoto, Kumamoto, Japan	Retained Japanese mini-flyweight title
Win	17–4–5	(Japan) Takumi Sakae	UD	10	Mar 26, 2016	Foodpal Kumamoto, Kumamoto, Japan	Retained Japanese mini-flyweight title
Win	16–4–5	(Japan) Hiroya Yamamoto	UD	10	Nov 22, 2015	Foodpal Kumamoto, Kumamoto, Japan	Won vacant Japanese mini-flyweight title
Win	15–4–5	(Thailand) Chaowalit Choedram	TKO	3 (8), 1:21	Aug 16, 2015	Kyuden Gym, Fukuoka, Japan	
Win	14–4–5	(Thailand) Pangporn Por Singdet	TKO	2 (8), 1:35	Mar 1, 2015	Ohmmaharuay, Romklao, Bangkok, Thailand	
Draw	13–4–5	(Thailand) Teeraphong Utaida	MD	8	Sep 10, 2014	(Thailand) Liptapanlop Hall, Nakhon Ratchasima, Japan	
Win	13–4–4	(Thailand) Prabpram Sithprakarn	KO	2 (6), 1:30	Jun 8, 2014	Foodpal Kumamoto, Kumamoto, Japan	
Draw	12–4–4	(Japan) Akiyoshi Kanazawa	TD	7 (8), 0:48	Apr 20, 2014	Clover Plaza, Kasuga, Japan	
Loss	12–4–3	(Japan) Takuma Inoue	UD	6	Dec 6, 2013	Ryōgoku Kokugikan, Sumida, Tokyo, Japan	
Loss	12–3–3	(Japan) Yu Kimura	UD	8	Jul 6, 2013	Korakuen Hall, Tokyo, Japan	
Win	12–2–3	(Thailand) Attachailek Sithsaithong	TKO	5 (10), 2:45	May 26, 2013	Foodpal Kumamoto, Kumamoto, Japan	
Win	11–2–3	(Thailand) Wisarutlek Korat Sport School	KO	3 (8), 1:34	Apr 14, 2013	Clover Plaza, Kasuga, Japan	
Win	10–2–3	(Japan) Koki Ono	UD	6	Oct 7, 2012	Foodpal Kumamoto, Kumamoto, Japan	
Draw	9–2–3	(Japan) Koji Itagaki	MD	6	Apr 22, 2012	Clover Plaza, Kasuga, Japan	
Loss	9–2–2	(Japan) Hiroyuki Otsuka	TKO	4 (8), 2:27	Feb 4, 2012	Korakuen Hall, Tokyo, Japan	
Win	9–1–2	(Japan) Katsuhiko Arakaki	TD	5 (6), 2:29	May 29, 2011	Clover Plaza, Kasuga, Japan	
Win	8–1–2	(Japan) Sakae Kano	UD	6	Apr 2, 2011	Onoyama Budokan, Naha, Japan	
Win	7–1–2	(Japan) Yuta Nakashima	UD	6	Mar 13, 2011	Foodpal Kumamoto, Kumamoto, Japan	
Win	6–1–2	(Japan) Koichiro Takesako	UD	6	May 9, 2010	Foodpal Kumamoto, Kumamoto, Japan	
Loss	5–1–2	(Japan) Takuya Mitamura	UD	5	Dec 20, 2009	Korakuen Hall, Tokyo, Japan	
Win	5–0–2	(Japan) Ryuichi Kawano	MD	5	Nov 14, 2009	City Hall, Nagoya, Japan	
Draw	4–0–2	(Japan) Junya Shimoo	MD	5	Sep 26, 2009	Clover Plaza, Kasuga, Japan	
Draw	4–0–1	(Japan) Masaki Hirai	TD	2 (4), 0:51	May 31, 2009	Sogo Gym, Masukicho, Japan	
Win	4–0	(Japan) Takashi Mihara	KO	4 (4), 1:19	Marc29, 2009	City Sogo Gym, Tagawa. Japan	
Win	3–0	(Japan) Shingo Hino	UD	4	Dec 20, 2008	Momochi Gym, Fukuoka, Japan	
Win	2–0	(Japan) Yuki Mizumoto	MD	4	Jun 22, 2008	Sogo Gym, Masukicho, Japan	
Win	1–0	(Japan) Katsuhiko Muranaka	MD	4	Apr 14, 2008	Prefectural Gymnasium, Hiroshima, Japan	

== See also ==
- List of Mini-flyweight boxing champions
- List of Japanese boxing world champions

Achievements
Vacant Title last held by Merlito Sabillo	WBO mini-flyweight champion Interim title February 26, 2017 – April 14, 2017; Promoted	Vacant
Preceded by Katsunari Takayama; Retired	WBO mini-flyweight champion April 14, 2017 – August 27, 2017	Succeeded by Ryuya Yamanaka
