= Wenfeng Ge =

Chinese boxer

Personal information
- Nationality: Chinese
- Born: Wenfeng Ge; 22 April 1987 (age 39) Shijiazhuang, China
- Height: 5 ft 6.5 in (1.69 m)
- Weight: Flyweight

Boxing career
- Stance: Orthodox

Boxing record
- Total fights: 13
- Wins: 12
- Win by KO: 6
- Losses: 1

Wenfeng Ge (Chinese: 葛文峰; pinyin: Wenfeng Ge; born 22 April 1987) is a Chinese professional boxer. He held the WBO Oriental Flyweight title after defeating former World Champion Amnat Ruenroeng of Thailand on November 21, 2017, and the WBO International Flyweight Title after defeating Filipino Ivan Soriano last August 24, 2018. Ge challenge Giemel Magramo of the Philippines for the unification of the WBO International and Oriental Flyweight Titles, but failed in a 10th round RTD loss.

== Professional boxing record ==
12 fights	11 wins	1 loss
By knockout	6	1
By decision	5	0
Draws	0	

No.	Result	Record	Opponent	Type	Round, time	Date	Location	Notes
13	Win	12-1	(Thailand) Kompayak Porpramook	UD	12	2019-10-26	(China) Yubei Stadium, Chongqing	
12	Loss	11-1	(Philippines) Giemel Magramo	RTD	10(12)	2019-01-05	(China) Suzhou Olympic sport center, Suzhou	Defending WBO International and for the WBO Oriental Title (Unification)
11	Win	11-0	(Philippines) Ivan Soriano	UD	12	2018-08-24	(China) ShenZhen Bao'an District Sports Center, Shenzhen	Won vacant WBO International Flyweight Title
10	Win	10-0	(Thailand) Amnat Ruenroeng	UD	12	2017-11-21	(China) Suzhou Sports Center, Suzhou	Won vacant WBO Oriental Super Flyweight Title
9	Win	9–0	(Thailand) Yutthichai Wannawong	TKO	5(8)	2017-10-10	(Thailand) Ram 100 Thai Boxing Stadium, Ramkamhaeng, Bangkok	Won vacant Thai Super Flyweight Title
8	Win	8–0	(Thailand) Net Kosa	KO	2(6)	2017-09-29	(Thailand) Singmanassak Muaythai School, Pathum Thani	
7	Win	7–0	(Thailand) Kittisak Khunmi	KO	2(6)	2017-09-04	(Thailand) Ram 100 Thai Boxing Stadium, Ramkamhaeng, Bangkok	
6	Win	6–0	(Thailand) Thapakorn Tagimnok	KO	1(6)	2017-09-02	(Thailand) Ram 100 Thai Boxing Stadium, Ramkamhaeng, Bangkok	
5	Win	5–0	(Philippines) Melmark Dignos	UD	10	2017-01-30	(Macau) Cotai Arena, Venetian Resort, Macao	Won vacant IBF Asia Bantamweight Title
4	Win	4–0	(Thailand) Sorawit Bamrungrai	TKO	2 (10)	2016-12-23	(China) Suzhou Sports Center, Suzhou	Defended WBO China National Bantamweight Title
3	Win	3–0	(Thailand) Namchok Nakathon	TKO	4(10)	2016-12-03	(China) ShenZhen Bao'an District Sports Center, Shenzhen	Won vacant WBO China National Bantamweight Title
2	Win	2–0	(Philippines) Joseph Omana	UD	8	2015-11-28	(China) Suzhou Sports Center, Suzhou	
1	Win	1–0	(China) Xu Gao Yan	UD	6	2015-10-17	(China) Dushu Lake Gym, Suzhou	

== Titles in boxing ==
Regional Titles:

- WBO International Flyweight Title (112 lbs)
- WBO Oriental Super Flyweight Title (115 lbs)
- IBF Asia Bantamweight Title (118 lbs)
- Thai Super Flyweight Title (115 lbs)
- WBO China National Bantamweight Title (118 lbs)
