= Moisés Calleros =

Mexican boxer (1989–2024)

Personal information
- Nickname: Puñeton
- Born: May 14, 1989 Monclova, Coahuila, Mexico
- Died: March 1, 2024 (aged 34)
- Height: 5 ft 4 in (163 cm)
- Weight: Minimumweight; Flyweight

Boxing career
- Reach: 68 in (173 cm)
- Stance: Orthodox

Boxing record
- Total fights: 49
- Wins: 37
- Win by KO: 20
- Losses: 11
- Draws: 1

Moisés Calleros (14 May 1989 - 1 March 2024) was a Mexican professional boxer.

On 26 February 2017 Calleros lost by split decision to Tatsuya Fukuhara for the interim World Boxing Organization minimumweight title.

On 18 March 2018 Calleros challenged Ryuya Yamanaka for the World Boxing Organization minimumweight title, losing by 8th round technical knockout.

On 23 October 2020 Calleros fought Julio Cesar Martinez, losing by 2nd-round technical knockout; Calleros was supposed to challenge Martinez for the World Boxing Council flyweight title, but came into the fight overweight.

Calleros was found dead by his wife on 1 March 2024. A few months later, UK Anti-Doping, unaware of his death, banned Calleros for four years due to testing positive to cocaine after his 2023 fight in London Against Galal Yafai.

== Professional boxing record ==
49 fights	37 wins	11 losses
By knockout	20	5
By decision	17	6
Draws	1	

No.	Result	Record	Opponent	Type	Round, time	Date	Location	Notes
49	Win	37–11–1	Gerardo Verde	KO	1 (8), 2:35	16 Dec 2023	Ensenada, Mexico	
48	Loss	36–11–1	Galal Yafai	TKO	4 (10), 0:44	1 Apr 2023	The O2 Arena, London, England	
47	Win	36–10–1	Juan Alejo Zuniga	TKO	4 (10), 1:49	16 Dec 2022	Monclova, Mexico	
46	Win	35–10–1	Jose Alejandro Burgos	UD	10	25 Mar 2022	Gimnasio Jesus Zapata, Ensenada, Mexico	
45	Win	34–10–1	Mauricio Fuentes	KO	5 (10), 1:45	29 May 2021	Auditorio FIME, Monclova, Mexico	
44	Loss	33–10–1	Julio Cesar Martinez	TKO	2 (12), 2:42	23 Oct 2020	Gimnasio TV Azteca, Mexico City, Mexico	
43	Win	33–9–1	Javier Marquez Clemente	UD	6	1 Feb 2020	Jardin Cerveza Expo, Guadalupe, Mexico	
42	Win	32–9–1	Christian Bacasegua Rangel	MD	10	6 Sep 2019	Auditorio del Estado, Mexicali, Mexico	Won vacant WBO–NABO flyweight title
41	Win	31–9–1	Oscar Saucedo Gonzalez	UD	10	27 Jul 2019	Auditorio Municipal, Tampico, Mexico	
40	Win	30–9–1	Genaro Rios	TKO	8 (10), 2:50	4 Apr 2019	Arena Hotel Marriot, Monterrey, Mexico	
39	Win	29–9–1	Gerardo Jasso	UD	10	14 Dec 2018	Auditorio Municipal Milo Martínez de la Rosa, Monclova, Mexico	
38	Loss	28–9–1	José Argumedo	UD	10	7 Jul 2018	Domo del Parque San Rafael, Guadalajara, Mexico	
37	Loss	28–8–1	Ryuya Yamanaka	RTD	8 (12), 3:00	18 Mar 2018	Portopia Hotel, Kobe, Japan	For WBO minimumweight title
36	Win	28–7–1	Samuel Garcia	KO	3 (6)	20 Oct 2017	Auditorio Municipal Milo Martínez de la Rosa, Monclova, Mexico	
35	Win	27–7–1	Mario Rodríguez	UD	8	12 Aug 2017	Gimnasio Nuevo León, Monterrey, Mexico	
34	Win	26–7–1	Jose Emmanuel Zuniga	KO	2 (6)	5 May 2017	Auditorio Municipal Milo Martínez de la Rosa, Monclova, Mexico	
33	Loss	25–7–1	Tatsuya Fukuhara	SD	12	26 Feb 2017	Matsushima Athletic Park Gym, Kami-Amakusa, Japan	For WBO interim minimumweight title
32	Win	25–6–1	Mario Rodríguez	UD	8	30 Jul 2016	Auditorio Municipal, Tijuana, Mexico	
31	Win	24–6–1	Jose Manuel Sanchez Terrones	UD	8	2 Apr 2016	Auditorio BB, Mexico City, Mexico	
30	Win	23–6–1	Eduardo Martinez	UD	10	18 Nov 2015	Casino Raíces, Playa del Carmen, Mexico	Won NABF minimumweight title
29	Win	22–6–1	Carlos Perez	UD	10	25 Sep 2015	Arena El Jefe, Monterrey, Mexico	
28	Win	21–6–1	Jorge Garcia Jimenez	SD	4	23 Dec 2014	Salón de la Sección 288, Monclova, Mexico	
27	Loss	20–6–1	Samuel Gutierrez Hernandez	KO	4 (10)	30 May 2014	Ciudad Deportiva, Monclova, Mexico	
26	Loss	20–5–1	Francisco Rodríguez Jr.	UD	12	15 Nov 2013	Monterrey, Mexico	
25	Win	20–4–1	Jair Vera	KO	2 (6)	26 May 2013	Salón de la Sección 288, Monclova, Mexico	
24	Win	19–4–1	Leiver Perez	MD	10	22 Mar 2013	Arena Coliseo, Monterrey, Mexico	
23	Win	18–4–1	Juan Alberto Castro	UD	8	7 Dec 2012	Auditorio Municipal Milo Martínez de la Rosa, Monclova, Mexico	
22	Loss	17–4–1	Julian Yedras	SD	6	31 Mar 2012	Poliforum Zamna, Mérida, Mexico	
21	Win	17–3–1	Regulo Gamez	KO	3 (6)	15 Dec 2011	Monclova, Mexico	
20	Win	16–3–1	Martin Reyes	KO	2 (6)	28 Oct 2011	Monclova, Mexico	
19	Draw	15–3–1	Jose Maria Segovia	MD	8	11 Jun 2011	Complejo Deportivo La Inalámbrica, Mérida, Mexico	
18	Win	15–3	Hector Alberto Jaramillo	KO	2 (8)	15 Apr 2011	Salón de la Sección 288, Monclova, Mexico	
17	Win	14–3	Martin Reyes	KO	1 (4)	26 Feb 2011	Monclova, Mexico	
16	Win	13–3	Samuel Garcia	UD	8	20 Dec 2010	Salón de la Sección 288, Monclova, Mexico	
15	Win	12–3	Juan de Dios Gomez	KO	6 (8)	19 Nov 2010	Monclova, Mexico	
14	Win	11–3	Reynaldo Avila	KO	2 (4)	16 Sep 2010	Monclova, Mexico	
13	Loss	10–3	Carlos Perez	KO	11 (12)	30 Jul 2010	Arena Solidaridad, Monterrey, Mexico	For WBC Latino minimumweight title
12	Win	10–2	Adolfo Pena	UD	6	11 May 2010	Arena El Jefe, Monterrey, Mexico	
11	Loss	9–2	Carlos Perez	UD	6	6 Feb 2010	Arena Monterrey, Monterrey, Mexico	
10	Win	9–1	Arturo Garcia	TKO	3 (4), 2:16	21 Nov 2009	Palenque dela EXPOMEX, Nuevo Laredo, Mexico	
9	Win	8–1	Miguel Aleman	KO	5 (6)	30 Sep 2009	Monterrey, Mexico	
8	Win	7–1	Carlos Estrada	KO	3 (4)	29 Aug 2009	Nueva Rosita, Mexico	
7	Win	6–1	Arturo Infante	KO	4 (4)	6 Jul 2009	Múzquiz, Mexico	
6	Loss	5–1	Juan de Dios Gomez	SD	4	27 Jun 2009	Plaza de Toros, Nuevo Laredo, Mexico	
5	Win	5–0	Carlos Estrada	KO	2 (4)	26 Apr 2009	Piedras Negras, Mexico	
4	Win	4–0	Irving Cortes	PTS	4	13 Feb 2009	Monclova, Mexico	
3	Win	3–0	Cesar Montemayor	KO	2 (4)	21 Dec 2008	Monclova, Mexico	
2	Win	2–0	Amado Carlos	TKO	1 (4)	22 Nov 2008	Plaza de Toros Monumental, Monterrey, Mexico	
1	Win	1–0	Alonso Corpus	UD	4	10 Oct 2008	Arena Coliseo, Monterrey, Mexico	
