= Jonathan Taconing =

Filipino boxer (born 1987)

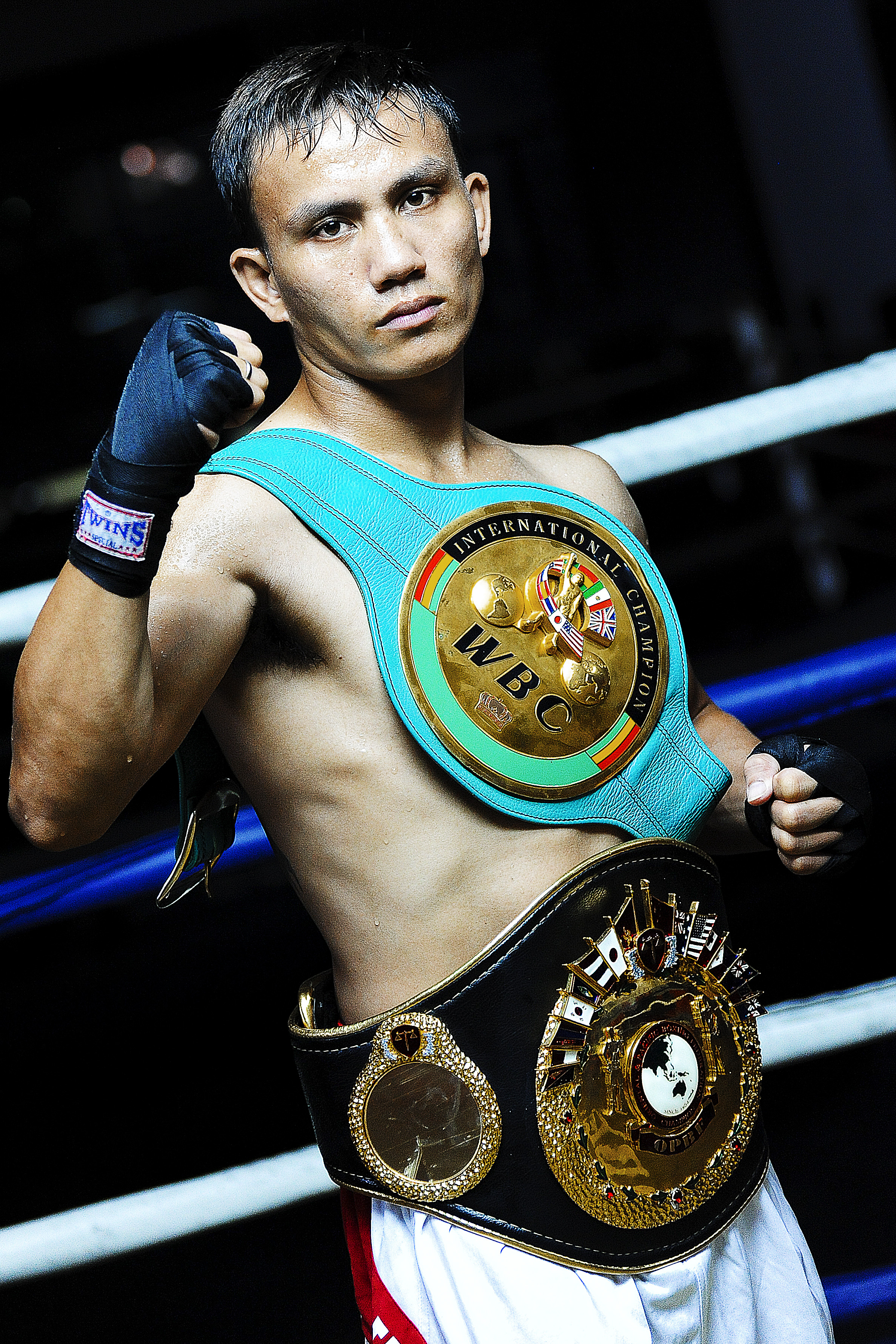
- TATA4 (27346468623) Taconing in 2015

Personal information
- Nickname: Lightning
- Nationality: Filipino
- Born: Jonathan Inguito Taconing; January 12, 1987 (age 39) Siocon, Zamboanga del Norte, Philippines
- Height: 157 cm (5 ft 2 in)
- Weight: Light Flyweight

Boxing career
- Stance: Southpaw

Boxing record
- Total fights: 34
- Wins: 29
- Win by KO: 22
- Losses: 4
- Draws: 1

Jonathan Inguito Taconing (born 12 January 1987) is a Filipino boxer. He is a former light flyweight champion of the Oriental and Pacific Boxing Federation, and the current International light flyweight champion of the World Boxing Council, a title he already once held in his career, from 2010 to 2012. He and Mark Magsayo were named the Most Promising Boxers of the Year at the 2016 Elorde Boxing Awards. Taconing is trained by former Filipino professional boxer Eddie Ballaran and under the management of Johnny Elorde.

As of July 2019, Taconing is ranked no. 1 in the WBC Light Flyweight Division.

== Early years ==
Taconing started boxing at age 14 in amateur boxing. He fought 30 amateur bouts earning ₱500, around US$10, per fight. He decided to fight professionally after seeing boxing legend Manny Pacquiao beats Fahsan "3k Battery" of Thailand in 2007.

He is with a common-law wife Marybeth Francisco-Taconing and has three children.

== Notable fights ==
Taconing vs Porpramook
Jonathan Taconing lost a highly controversial fight against then WBC Light Flyweight Champion Kompayak Porpramook in Buriram, Thailand. Referee stopped the fight at the end of the 5th round due to a cut on Porpramook after an accidental clash of heads in the previous round.

WBC reviewed the performance of the South Korean referee Jae-Bong Kim and as a result suspended Kim for one year.

Taconing vs Hirales
Jonathan Taconing TKO Ramon Garcia Hirales in a one-sided fight on 4 April 2015 in Metepec, Mexico, Mexico, gaining the WBC No. 1 ranking. Referee stopped the fight at 2:53 on the 10th and final round.

Taconing vs Lopez
July 2, 2016 Jonathan Taconing lost another title fight for the second time against the WBC Light Flyweight Champion Ganigan Lopez in Arena Coliseo, Mexico City, Mexico. All judges score the bout 115-112, 118-109, 119-108 with a unanimous decision win for Lopez.

== Professional boxing record ==
29 wins (21 knockouts), 4 defeats, 1 draw
No.	Res.	Record	Opponent	Type	Round Time	Date	Location	Notes
34	Win	29–4–1	(Philippines) Albert Alcoy	UD	6	2021-10-23	(Philippines) The Flash Grand Ballroom of the Elorde Sports Complex, Parañaque	
33	Loss	28–4–1	(Japan) Ken Shiro	TKO	4 (12)	2019-07-12	(Japan) Edion Arena, Osaka	
32	Win	28–3–1	(Philippines) Vince Paras	UD	12	2018-09-22	(Philippines) The Flash Grand Ballroom of the Elorde Sports Complex, Parañaque	Retained World Boxing Council International Light Flyweight Title
31	Win	27–3–1	(Philippines) Robert Onggocan	UD	10	2018-03-25	(Philippines) Okada Manila Hotel and Casino, Parañaque	
30	Win	26–3–1	(Philippines) Arnold Garde	KO	2 (12)	2017-10-15	(Philippines) The Flash Grand Ballroom of the Elorde Sports Complex, Parañaque	Won World Boxing Council International Light Flyweight Title
29	Win	25–3–1	(Indonesia) Silem Serang	KO	3 (10)	2017-07-29	(Philippines) The Flash Grand Ballroom of the Elorde Sports Complex, Parañaque	
28	Win	24–3–1	(Indonesia) Ellias Nggenggo	TKO	1 (10)	2017-03-25	(Philippines) Manila Hotel, Manila, Metro Manila	
27	Win	23–3–1	(Philippines) Salatiel Amit	TKO	10 (10), 0:39	2016-11-19	(Philippines) The Flash Grand Ballroom of the Elorde Sports Complex, Parañaque, Metro Manila	Won the WBC International Light Flyweight Title
26	Loss	22–3–1	(Mexico) Ganigan López	UD	12	2016-07-02	Arena Coliseo, Mexico City	For the WBC Light Flyweight Title.
25	Win	22–2–1	(Philippines) Jomar Fajardo	TD	10 (10)	2015-09-12	(Philippines) The Flash Grand Ballroom, Elorde Sports Complex, Sucat, Parañaque, Metro Manila	
24	Win	21–2–1	(Mexico) Ramon Garcia Hirales	TKO	10 (10), 2:53	2015-04-04	(Mexico) Unidad Deportiva Martín Alarcón, Metepec México	
23	Win	20–2–1	(Indonesia) Oscar Raknafa	RTD	4 (10), 3:00	2014-12-21	(Philippines) The Flash Grand Ballroom, Elorde Sports Complex, Sucat, Parañaque, Metro Manila	
22	Win	19–2–1	(Thailand) Jaipetch Chaiyonggym	TKO	3 (10), 1:52	2014-07-05	(Philippines) The Flash Grand Ballroom, Elorde Sports Complex, Sucat, Parañaque, Metro Manila	
21	Win	18–2–1	(Philippines) Virgilio Silvano	TKO	11 (12), 1:42	2014-03-025	(Philippines) Sofitel Plaza, Pasay, Metro Manila	Won the OPBF Light Flyweight Title
20	Win	17–2–1	(Thailand) Namphol Sithsaithong	KO	2 (10), 1:05	2013-12-14	(Philippines) The Flash Grand Ballroom, Elorde Sports Complex, Sucat, Parañaque, Metro Manila	
19	Win	16–2–1	(Thailand) Rambo Sithsaithong	KO	1 (10), 2:05	2013-08-10	(Philippines) The Flash Grand Ballroom, Elorde Sports Complex, Sucat, Parañaque, Metro Manila	
18	Win	15–2–1	(Thailand) Manot Comput	KO	5 (10), 1:54	2013-03-25	(Philippines) Sofitel Plaza, Pasay, Metro Manila	
17	Win	14–2–1	(Thailand) Chatchai Or Benjamas	RTD	4 (10), 3:00	2012-11-10	(Philippines) The Flash Grand Ballroom, Elorde Sports Complex, Sucat, Parañaque, Metro Manila	
16	Loss	13–2–1	(Thailand) Kompayak Porpramook	TD	5 (12), 3:00	2012-05-03	(Thailand) Provincial Hall, Buriram	For WBC Light Flyweight Title
15	Win	13-1–1	(Philippines) Samuel Apuya	RTD	4 (8), 3:00	2012-03-25	(Philippines) Dusit Thani Manila Hotel, Makati City, Metro Manila	
14	Win	12-1–1	(Thailand) Ngaoprajan Chuwatana	UD	12 (12)	2011-10-17	(Philippines) Ibalong Recreation Center, Legazpi City, Albay	Retained the WBC International Light Flyweight Title
13	Win	11-1–1	(Thailand) Lookdiaw Tor Buamas	TKO	13 (12)	2011-03-25	(Philippines) Sofitel Plaza, Pasay, Metro Manila	Retained the WBC International Light Flyweight Title
12	Win	10-1–1	(Philippines) Pit Anacaya	TKO	4 (10), 3:00	2010-12-18	(Philippines) The Flash Grand Ballroom, Elorde Sports Complex, Sucat, Parañaque, Metro Manila	
11	Win	9-1–1	(Philippines) Warlito Parrenas	TKO	6 (12), 1:59	2010-07-31	(Philippines) Ynares Sports Complex, Pasig, Metro Manila	Won vacant WBC International Light Flyweight Title
10	Win	8-1–1	(Philippines) Quilber Cailing	TKO	1 (10), 2:20	2009-10-24	(Philippines) The Flash Grand Ballroom, Elorde Sports Complex, Sucat, Parañaque, Metro Manila	
9	Draw	7-1-1	(Philippines) Erwin Picardal	D	8(8)	2009-7-25	(Philippines) The Flash Grand Ballroom, Elorde Sports Complex, Sucat, Parañaque, Metro Manila	
8	Win	7-1	(Philippines) Rey Sumapig	UD	8 (8)	2009-1-31	(Philippines) The Flash Grand Ballroom, Elorde Sports Complex, Sucat, Parañaque, Metro Manila	
7	Win	6-1	(Philippines) Esmalben Bujas	TKO	2 (6), 1:38	2008-11-15	(Philippines) The Flash Grand Ballroom, Elorde Sports Complex, Sucat, Parañaque, Metro Manila	
6	Win	5-1	(Philippines) Jay-ar Bincolado	TKO	1 (6), 1:51	2008-07-26	(Philippines) The Flash Grand Ballroom, Elorde Sports Complex, Sucat, Parañaque, Metro Manila	
5	Loss	4-1	(Philippines) Joe Galamiton	SD	6(6)	2008-02-09	(Philippines) The Flash Grand Ballroom, Elorde Sports Complex, Sucat, Parañaque, Metro Manila	
4	Win	4-0	(Philippines) Jay-ar Bincolado	UD	6(6), 1:51	2008-02-09	(Philippines) The Flash Grand Ballroom, Elorde Sports Complex, Sucat, Parañaque, Metro Manila	
3	Win	3-0	(Philippines) Joey Balmes	TKO	2(4), 1:06	2007-10-06	(Philippines) The Flash Grand Ballroom, Elorde Sports Complex, Sucat, Parañaque, Metro Manila	
2	Win	2-0	(Philippines) Robert Talape	TKO	1(4), 2:46	2007-07-28	(Philippines) The Flash Grand Ballroom, Elorde Sports Complex, Sucat, Parañaque, Metro Manila	
1	Win	1-0	(Philippines) Tinglot Perez	TKO	1(4), 0:58	2007-02-03	(Philippines) The Flash Grand Ballroom, Elorde Sports Complex, Sucat, Parañaque, Metro Manila	Professional debut
TKO - Technical Knockout, KO - Knockout, TD - Technical Decision, RTD - Referee Technical Decision, SD - Split Decision, UD - Unanimous Decision, D - Draw

=== Titles ===
- OPBF Light Flyweight Champion (108 lbs)
- WBC International Light Flyweight Champion (108 lbs) (3x)
