= Ganigan López =

Mexican boxer

Personal information
- Nickname: El Maravilla
- Born: Ganigan López; 12 November 1981 (age 44) Amecameca, Mexico
- Height: 5 ft 4 1/2 in (164 cm)
- Weight: Mini flyweight; Light flyweight; Flyweight

Boxing career
- Reach: 65 in (165 cm)
- Stance: Southpaw

Boxing record
- Total fights: 51
- Wins: 38
- Win by KO: 19
- Losses: 13

Ganigan López (born 12 November 1981) is a Mexican professional boxer who held the WBC light flyweight title between 2016 and 2017.

== Professional career ==
López turned professional in 2003 and earned his first world title opportunity in 2015 against compatriot Pedro Guevara, López would lose via unanimous decision. López would get a second opportunity at a world title and this time would be successful as he would dethrone Japanese fighter Yu Kimura.

== Professional boxing record ==
51 fights	38 wins	13 losses
By knockout	19	6
By decision	18	7
By disqualification	1	0

No.	Result	Record	Opponent	Type	Round, time	Date	Location	Notes
51	Loss	38–13	(Costa Rica) David Jiménez	KO	7 (8)	2024-01-19	(Costa Rica) Alajuela	
50	Win	38–12	(Mexico) Carlos Vado Bautista	SD	8	2023-02-18	(Mexico) Amecameca	
49	Loss	37–12	(Venezuela) Carlos Cañizales	KO	4 (10)	2022-03-26	(Mexico) Foro Centenario, Coyoacán	For vacant WBA Continental Americans flyweight title
48	Win	37–11	(Colombia) Jose Soto	DQ	5 (10)	2021-10-22	Deportivo Oceania, Mexico City	Won vacant WBA Fedecentro Super flyweight title
47	Loss	36–11	(Pakistan) Muhammad Waseem	UD	8	2019-11-22	Caesars Palace, Dubai, United Arab Emirates	
46	Loss	36–10	(Mexico) Armando Torres	KO	1 (10)	2019-10-11	Auditorio BB, Mexico City, Mexico	
45	Win	36–9	(Mexico) Saúl Juárez	SD	10	2019-07-19	Auditorio Blackberry, Mexico City, Mexico	For vacant WBC Latino flyweight title
44	Loss	35–9	(Puerto Rico) Ángel Acosta	KO	8 (12)	2019-03-30	(United States) Fantasy Springs Resort Casino, Indio	For WBO Light flyweight Title
43	Win	35–8	(Mexico) Ricardo Rodriguez	UD	10 (10)	2018-11-23	Auditorio Blackberry, Mexico City	Won vacant WBC Latino Silver Flyweight Title
42	Loss	34–8	(Japan) Kenshiro Teraji	KO	2 (12)	2018-05-25	(Japan) Ota City General Gymnasium, Ōta, Tokyo	For WBC light flyweight title
41	Win	34–7	(Mexico) Efren Bautista	TKO	7 (10)	2017-11-18	(Mexico) Amecameca	
40	Loss	33–7	(Japan) Kenshiro Teraji	MD	12 (12)	2017-05-20	(Japan) Ariake Coliseum, Kōtō, Tokyo	Lost WBC light flyweight title
39	Win	33–6	(Philippines) Jonathan Taconing	UD	12 (12)	2016-07-02	Arena Coliseo, Mexico City	Retained WBC light flyweight title
38	Win	32–6	(Japan) Yu Kimura	MD	12 (12)	2016-03-04	(Japan) Shimazu Arena, Kyoto	Won WBC light flyweight title
37	Win	31–6	(Mexico) Juan Lopez Martinez	TKO	4 (10)	2015-10-30	Auditorio Blackberry, Mexico City	Won vacant WBC Latino flyweight Title
36	Loss	30–6	(Mexico) Pedro Guevara	UD	12 (12)	2015-07-04	(Mexico) Centro de Usos Multiples, Mazatlan	For WBC light flyweight title
35	Win	30–5	(Mexico) Genaro Rios	TKO	3 (8)	2014-11-08	(Mexico) Auditorio General Arteaga, Queretaro	
34	Win	29–5	(Mexico) Mario Rodríguez	UD	12 (12)	2014-01-04	(Mexico) Polideportivo Río de Janeiro, Guadalajara	Won WBC International Light flyweight Title
33	Win	28–5	(Philippines) Mateo Handig	UD	12 (12)	2013-08-24	(Mexico) Lienzo Charro “Los Tamaulipecos”, Reynosa	Won USNBC Minimumweight Title
32	Win	27–5	(Mexico) Josue Vega	TKO	3 (10)	2013-01-05	Deportivo del Sindicato del Metro, Mexico City	
31	Win	26–5	(Mexico) Luis Ceja	UD	12 (12)	2012-11-17	(Mexico) Unidad Deportiva, Acapulco	Won vacant WBF Light flyweight Title
30	Loss	25–5	(Philippines) Denver Cuello	TKO	2 (12)	2012-05-19	(Mexico) Palenque de la Feria, Celaya	Lost WBC Silver Minimumweight Title
29	Win	25–4	(Mexico) Samuel Garcia	TKO	10 (10)	2011-10-28	Deportivo del Sindicato del Metro, Mexico City	
28	Win	24–4	(Mexico) Josue Vega	TKO	5 (10)	2011-09-10	(Mexico) Jose Cuervo Salon, Polanco	
27	Win	23–4	(Mexico) Omar Rosales	TKO	7 (12)	2011-05-21	(Mexico) Centro de Espectáculos, Morelia	Retained WBC Silver Minimumweight Title
26	Win	22–4	(Nicaragua) Miguel Tellez	KO	2 (10)	2011-03-25	(Mexico) Jose Cuervo Salon, Polanco	
25	Win	21–4	(Mexico) Armando Torres	UD	12 (12)	2011-01-08	Arena Coliseo, Mexico City	Retained WBC Silver Minimumweight Title
24	Win	20–4	(Puerto Rico) Omar Soto	UD	12 (12)	2010-08-14	Foro Corona, Mexico City	Won vacant WBC Silver Minimumweight Title
23	Win	19–4	(Mexico) Gerardo Pinon	TKO	11 (12)	2010-05-29	(Mexico) Deportivo Trabajadores del Metro, Iztacalco	Won WBC Latino Light flyweight title
22	Loss	18–4	(Mexico) Adrián Hernández	SD	10 (10)	2010-02-27	(Mexico) Coliseo Olimpico de la UG, Guadalajara	
21	Win	18–3	(Mexico) José Alfredo Zúñiga	TKO	3 (12)	2009-07-02	(Mexico) Woda Night Club, Lomas de Sotelo	Won CABOFE Light flyweight title
20	Loss	17–3	(Mexico) José Alfredo Zúñiga	SD	12 (12)	2009-03-21	(Mexico) Plaza de Toros, Nuevo Laredo	Lost WBC Latino Minimumweight title
19	Win	17–2	(Mexico) Raul Garay Carreon	KO	1 (10)	2008-12-12	(Mexico) Roots Magic Club, Lomas de Sotelo	
18	Win	16–2	(Mexico) Juan de Dios Gomez	TKO	3 (12)	2008-07-24	(Mexico) Roots Magic Club, Lomas de Sotelo	Retained WBC Latino Minimumweight title
17	Win	15–2	(Mexico) Vicente Hernandez	TKO	6 (12)	2008-05-14	(Mexico) Foro Scotiabank, Polanco	Retained WBC Latino Minimumweight title
16	Win	14–2	(Mexico) Javier Murillo	TKO	6 (10)	2007-11-18	(Mexico) Amecameca	
15	Win	13–2	(Mexico) Vicente Hernandez	TKO	9 (12)	2007-07-27	Vive Cuervo Salon, Mexico City	Won vacant WBC Latino Minimumweight title
14	Win	12–2	(Mexico) Antonio Garibay	TKO	4 (10)	2007-06-09	(Mexico) Arena Naucalpan, Naucalpan de Juárez	
13	Win	11–2	(Thailand) Wisan Banjong	TKO	7 (8)	2007-04-07	(Japan) Korakuen Hall, Tokyo	
12	Loss	10–2	(Nicaragua) Juan Palacios	UD	10 (10)	2006-03-18	(Nicaragua) Hotel Plaza Maya, Managua	
11	Win	10–1	(Mexico) Vicente Hernandez	PTS	6 (6)	2005-11-26	(Mexico) Palenque de la Feria, Tepic	
10	Win	9–1	(Mexico) Angel Rezago	TKO	6 (8)	2005-07-14	Salon 21, Mexico City	
9	Win	8–1	(Mexico) Javier Murillo	UD	8 (8)	2005-02-25	(Mexico) Arena Coliseo, Guadalajara	
8	Win	7–1	(Mexico) Manuel Ruiz	TKO	4 (6)	2004-12-10	(Mexico) Arena Coliseo, Monterrey	
7	Win	6–1	(Mexico) Jesus Jimenez	UD	6 (6)	2004-11-06	(Mexico) Tepic	
6	Win	5–1	(Mexico) Marcelo Lopez	SD	4 (4)	2004-09-03	(Mexico) Tepic	
5	Win	4–1	(Mexico) Sandro Rodriguez	UD	4 (4)	2004-07-14	(Mexico) Centro de Convenciones, Tlalnepantla	
4	Loss	3–1	(Mexico) Oscar Saturnino	UD	4 (4)	2004-05-06	Salon 21, Mexico City	
3	Win	3–0	(Mexico) Pablo De Jesus	PTS	4 (4)	2003-12-14	(Mexico) Feria de Chiapas, Tuxtla Gutierrez	
2	Win	2–0	(Mexico) Oscar Saturnino	UD	4 (4)	2003-10-04	Salon La Maraka, Mexico City	
1	Win	1–0	(Mexico) Gabriel Ramirez Anaya	UD	4 (4)	2003-08-07	Salon La Maraka, Mexico City	

== See also ==
- List of world light-flyweight boxing champions
- List of Mexican boxing world champions

Sporting positions
World boxing titles
Preceded by Yu Kimura	WBC light flyweight champion March 4, 2016 – May 20, 2017	Succeeded by Kenshiro Teraji
