= Yu Kimura (boxer) =

Japanese boxer (born 1983)

Personal information
- Born: Yu Kimura; November 23, 1983 (age 42) Chiba, Japan
- Height: 5 ft 4 in (163 cm)
- Weight: Light-flyweight

Boxing career
- Reach: 64 in (163 cm)
- Stance: Orthodox

Boxing record
- Total fights: 22
- Wins: 18
- Win by KO: 3
- Losses: 3
- Draws: 1

Yu Kimura (木村 悠, Kimura Yū; born 23 November 1983) is a Japanese former professional boxer who competed from 2006 to 2016. He held the WBC light-flyweight title between 2015 and 2016.

== Professional career ==
Kimura Turned professional in 2006 and went 9-1-1 in his first 11 fights before being stopped by future unified light-flyweight champion Ryoichi Taguchi. He bounced back and won his next 8 fights before he defeated Pedro Guevara by split decision to win the WBC light-flyweight title on November 28, 2015. He would go on to lose the title in his first defense to Mexican challenger Ganigan Lopez via majority decision. Kimura announced his retirement from boxing a few months after the Lopez fight.

== Professional boxing record ==
22 fights	18 wins	3 losses
By knockout	3	1
By decision	15	2
Draws	1	

No.	Result	Record	Opponent	Type	Round, time	Date	Location	Notes
22	Loss	18–3–1	(Mexico) Ganigan López	MD	12	2016-03-04	Shimazu Arena, Kyoto, Japan	Lost WBC light-flyweight title
21	Win	18–2–1	(Mexico) Pedro Guevara	SD	12	2015-11-28	Xebio Arena, Sendai, Japan	Won WBC light-flyweight title
20	Win	17–2–1	(Mexico) Jesus Faro	UD	10	2015-08-01	Korakuen Hall, Tokyo, Japan	
19	Win	16–2–1	(Japan) Hayato Yamaguchi	TKO	8 (10)	2015-04-04	Korakuen Hall, Tokyo, Japan	Retained Japanese light-flyweight title
18	Win	15–2–1	(Japan) Atsushi Aburada	TD	7 (10)	2014-11-01	Korakuen Hall, Tokyo, Japan	Retained Japanese light-flyweight title
17	Win	14–2–1	(Japan) Yuki Chinen	UD	10	2014-06-07	Korakuen Hall, Tokyo, Japan	Retained Japanese light-flyweight title
16	Win	13–2–1	(Japan) Kenichi Horikawa	SD	10	2014-02-01	Korakuen Hall, Tokyo, Japan	Won vacant Japanese light-flyweight title
15	Win	12–2–1	(Japan) Tatsuya Fukuhara	UD	8	2013-07-06	Korakuen Hall, Tokyo, Japan	
14	Win	11–2–1	(Japan) Takuro Habu	TKO	5 (8)	2013-01-12	Korakuen Hall, Tokyo, Japan	
13	Win	10–2–1	(Japan) Kenta Motoki	UD	8	2012-06-02	Korakuen Hall, Tokyo, Japan	
12	Loss	9–2–1	(Japan) Ryoichi Taguchi	TKO	6 (8)	2011-10-15	Korakuen Hall, Tokyo, Japan	
11	Win	9–1–1	(Japan) Masayoshi Segawa	UD	6	2011-07-05	Korakuen Hall, Tokyo, Japan	
10	Win	8–1–1	(Japan) Masashi Uranishi	UD	8	2011-03-05	Korakuen Hall, Tokyo, Japan	
9	Win	7–1–1	(Japan) Yoshitomo Machida	UD	8	2010-11-08	Korakuen Hall, Tokyo, Japan	
8	Win	6–1–1	(Japan) Takumi Suda	UD	8	2010-08-07	Korakuen Hall, Tokyo, Japan	
7	Win	5–1–1	(Japan) Kenta Koyama	UD	8	2010-03-29	Korakuen Hall, Tokyo, Japan	
6	Loss	4–1–1	(Japan) Shin Ono	TD	5 (8)	2008-06-21	Korakuen Hall, Tokyo, Japan	
5	Win	4–0–1	(Japan) Kazuya Matsumoto	UD	6	2008-03-15	Korakuen Hall, Tokyo, Japan	
4	Win	3–0–1	(Japan) Kenta Hirose	UD	6	2007-11-03	Korakuen Hall, Tokyo, Japan	
3	Draw	2–0–1	(Japan) Koji Itagaki	PTS	6	2007-06-16	Korakuen Hall, Tokyo, Japan	
2	Win	2–0	(Japan) Takashi Morishima	UD	6	2007-01-20	Korakuen Hall, Tokyo, Japan	
1	Win	1–0	(Thailand) Samkolek Chuwatana	KO	2 (6)	2006-10-07	Korakuen Hall, Tokyo, Japan	

== See also ==
- List of light-flyweight boxing champions
- List of Japanese boxing world champions

Achievements
Preceded by Pedro Guevara	WBC light flyweight champion November 28, 2015 - March 4, 2016	Succeeded by Ganigan López
