= Walter Tello =

Panamanian boxer (born 1986)

Personal information
- Nickname: Ratón de Oro ("Golden Rat")
- Born: 13 October 1986 (age 39) Puerto Armuelles, Panama
- Height: 5 ft 1 in (1.55 m)
- Weight: Minimumweight (105 lb); Light flyweight (108 lb)

Boxing career
- Reach: 58 in (147 cm)
- Stance: Orthodox

Boxing record
- Total fights: 31
- Wins: 21
- Win by KO: 8
- Losses: 11
- Draws: 0
- No contests: 0

Walter Tello (born 13 October 1986) is a Panamanian former professional boxer who competed from 2006 to 2016. He challenged for the WBO interim title in 2009 and the WBA title in 2010, both at mini flyweight.

== Professional career ==
Tello made his professional debut in 2006. After a quick 6-1 start to his career, he fought veteran Edwin Diaz for his WBO Latino mini flyweight title, and won by technical knockout (TKO) on 23 February 2008 for his first belt. After four more wins, he received a shot at the interim WBO mini flyweight title, but lost (in lopsided fashion) to Mexican fighter Manuel Vargas in Hermosillo by unanimous decision (UD) on 14 February 2009. It was his first fight outside Panama.

One year later, he received another world title shot when he fought Giovani Segura, again in Mexico, for his WBA light flyweight title. The bout, held on February 20, 2010, was stopped in Segura's favor in the third round after he landed several punishing uppercuts and hooks on the young Panamanian.

Tello lost consecutive bouts to world title contender Carlos Melo in November 2010 and March 2011, both by decision. However, Tello followed this up by defeating fellow countrymen Carlos Ortega twice within a span of a 17 months. This earned him a third world title shot. He fought Alberto Rossel for the interim WBA light flyweight belt in Callao, Peru on March 16, 2013. During the later rounds of the fight, Tello came close to getting knocked down various times, but survived all 12 rounds. However, the judges scored the bout 118-115, 118-114 and 117-111, all in favor of the hometown favorite, Rossel.

Tello won his second championship belt when he defeated Erick Flores (for the third time in his career) in Panama City on 4 June 2014 by fifth-round TKO to win the vacant WBC Latino light flyweight title. Flores abandoned the fight after an injury to his right shoulder.

Tello traveled to Shanghai to fight Randy Petalcorin for the WBA interim light flyweight title. Tello was knocked down in the seventh round with a right hook. Tello rose up, but was knocked down again shortly thereafter by a left cross. After the second knockdown, referee Raul Caiz, Sr. stopped the fight and awarded Petalcorin with the belt.

== Professional boxing record ==
21 Wins (8 knockouts, 13 decisions), 10 Losses (4 knockouts, 6 decisions), 0 Draws
Res.	Record	Opponent	Type	Rd., Time	Date	Location	Notes
Loss	21–10	(Panama) Azael Villar	UD	8	2016-03-10	Hotel El Panama, Panama City, Panama	
Loss	21–9	(Venezuela) Juan Jose Landaeta	TKO	9 (10), 2:49	2015-09-06	Techno Dome, Takaoka, Japan	
Win	21–8	(Panama) Edwin Diaz	UD	10	2014-10-25	Gimnasio Pandeportes-La Basita, David, Panama	
Loss	20–8	(Philippines) Randy Petalcorin	TKO	7 (12)	2014-08-26	Mercedes-Benz Arena, Shanghai, China	For interim WBA light flyweight title
Win	20–7	(Panama) Erick Flores	TKO	5 (8), 2:59	2014-06-04	Hotel RIU, Panama City, Panama	Won WBC Latino light flyweight title
Win	19–7	(Costa Rica) Dennis Espinoza	UD	6	2013-11-02	Turiscentro Panamá, Paso Canoas, Panama	
Loss	18–7	(Peru) Alberto Rossel	UD	12	2013-03-16	Coliseo Miguel Grau, Callao, Peru	For interim WBA light flyweight title
Win	18–6	(Panama) Carlos Ortega	MD	8	2012-12-01	Gimnasio Los Naranjos, Boquete, Panama	
Win	17–6	(Nicaragua) Reynaldo Mendoza	TKO	6 (8), 2:37	2012-07-14	Gimnasio Municipal, Puerto Armuelles, Panama	
Win	16–6	(Panama) Carlos Ortega	UD	8	2011-07-02	Feria de San Jose, David, Panama	
Loss	15–6	(Panama) Carlos Melo	UD	10	2011-03-15	Hotel Veneto, Panama City, Panama	For vacant Panamanian mini flyweight title
Loss	15–5	(Panama) Carlos Melo	SD	10	2010-11-30	Centro de Convenciones Atlapa, Panama City, Panama	
Win	15–4	(Colombia) Jorle Estrada	UD	10	2010-06-17	Discoteca Dubai, Panama City, Panama	
Loss	14–4	(Mexico) Giovani Segura	TKO	3 (12), 1:56	2010-02-20	Discoteca El Alebrije, Acapulco, Guerrero, Mexico	For WBA light flyweight title
Win	14–3	(Panama) Erick Flores	UD	8	2009-11-27	Roberto Durán Arena, Panama City, Panama	
Loss	13–3	(Panama) Luis Alberto Rios	TKO	4 (11), 1:22	2009-07-21	Centro de Convenciones Atlapa, Panama City, Panama	For vacant WBA Fedelatin and Panamanian mini flyweight titles
Win	13–2	(Nicaragua) Marlon Chavarria	TKO	3 (8), 1:42	2009-06-10	Centro de Convenciones Atlapa, Panama City, Panama	
Win	12–2	(Panama) Reynaldo Frutos	UD	8	2009-04-04	Gimnasio Los Naranjos, Boquete, Panama	
Loss	11–2	(Mexico) Manuel Vargas	UD	12	2009-02-14	Expo Forum, Hermosillo, Sonora, Mexico	For interim WBO mini flyweight title
Win	11–1	(Venezuela) Carlos Luis Campos	UD	8	2008-11-28	Centro de Convenciones Atlapa, Panama City, Panama	
Win	10–1	(Panama) Elvis Villagra	TKO	4 (6)	2008-08-02	Gimnasio Yuyin Luzcando, Betania, Panama	
Win	9–1	(Colombia) Jose Humberto Caraballo	TKO	5 (8)	2008-06-21	Gimnasio Yuyin Luzcando, Betania, Panama	
Win	8–1	(Panama) Humberto Obando	SD	10	2008-04-25	Gimnasio Yuyin Luzcando, Betania, Panama	
Win	7–1	(Panama) Edwin Díaz	TKO	7 (12)	2008-02-23	Gimnasio del Club de Leones, El Marañón, Panama	Won WBO Latino mini flyweight title
Win	6–1	(Panama) Erick Flores	UD	4	2007-12-01	Gimnasio Roberto Durán, Panama City, Panama	
Win	5–1	(Panama) Javier Carpintero	TKO	3 (4), 2:15	2007-09-08	Gimnasio del Club de Leones, El Marañón, Panama	
Win	4–1	(Panama) Jesus Santos	UD	4	2007-07-13	Domo de la Universidad de Panama, Panama City, Panama	
Win	3–1	(Panama) Ivan Gallardo	TKO	2 (4), 2:00	2006-12-16	Gimnasio del Club de Leones, El Marañón, Panama	
Win	2–1	(Panama) Humberto Obando	UD	4	2006-11-17	Hotel Melia, Colón, Panama	
Win	1–1	(Panama) Jesus Santos	UD	4	2006-06-17	Gimnasio Escolar, David, Panama	
Loss	0–1	(Panama) Ivan Gallardo	MD	4	2006-03-26	Feria de David, Chiriquí, Panama	

== Personal life ==
Tello is a part-time police officer in his native Panama.
