= Ricardo Pérez (boxer) =

Mexican professional boxer (born 1991)

Personal information
- Nickname: Torito
- Born: Joanan Ricardo Pérez Ramos; June 15, 1991 (age 35) Cancún, Quintana Roo, Mexico
- Weight: Mini flyweight; Light flyweight

Boxing career
- Stance: Orthodox

Boxing record
- Total fights: 12
- Wins: 10
- Win by KO: 8
- Losses: 2

Ricardo Pérez (born 15 June 1991) is a Mexican professional boxer who has been ranked in the mini flyweight and light flyweight world #10 by the WBC.

== Professional career ==
Pérez has won the WBC Silver titles at both mini flyweight and light flyweight, defeating Carlos Ortega and Noe Medina.

== Professional boxing record ==
12 fights	10 wins	2 losses
By knockout	8	0
By decision	2	2

No.	Result	Record	Opponent	Type	Round, time	Date	Location	Notes
12	Win	10–2	(Colombia) Mauricio Fuentes	UD	10	Mar 18, 2016	Oasis Hotel Complex, Cancún, Mexico	
11	Win	9–2	(Mexico) Noe Medina	TKO	9 (12), 1:01	Aug 21, 2015	Plaza 28 de Julio, Playa del Carmen, Mexico	Won vacant WBC Silver light flyweight title
10	Win	8–2	(Mexico) Fernando Ramon Godinez	TKO	3 (8), 2:48	Mar 28, 2015	Domo Deportivo, Tulum, Mexico	
9	Win	7–2	(Panama) Carlos Ortega	TKO	9 (12), 0:44	Dec 20, 2014	Arena Quequi, Cancún, Mexico	Won WBC Silver mini flyweight title
8	Loss	6–2	(Nicaragua) Byron Rojas	UD	8	May 17, 2014	Gimnasio Municipal Guy Rouck Chavez, Matagalpa, Nicaragua	
7	Win	6–1	(Mexico) Jose Escobar	KO	1 (10), 2:19	Nov 8, 2013	Salon Sol, Cancún, Mexico	Won vacant WBC Youth Silver light flyweight title
6	Win	5–1	(Mexico) Sebastian Arcos	KO	2 (6), 0:54	Sep 13, 2013	Sindicato de Taxistas, Cancún, Mexico	
5	Loss	4–1	(Mexico) Ulises Martin	SD	4	Jun 22, 2013	Complejo Deportivo La Inalámbrica, Mérida, Mexico	
4	Win	4–0	(Mexico) Omar Rodriguez	KO	5 (6), 0:29	May 11, 2013	Sindicato de Taxistas, Cancún, Mexico	
3	Win	3–0	(Mexico) Abraham Garcia	KO	3 (4), 1:35	Oct 9, 2012	Balneario Azul Ha, Cancún, Mexico	
2	Win	2–0	(Mexico) Jose Luis Chable	UD	4	Sep 21, 2012	Sindicato de Taxistas, Cancún, Mexico	
1	Win	1–0	(Mexico) Josue Martinez	KO	1 (4), 0:33	Jul 19, 2012	Plaza de la Reforma, Cancún, Mexico	Professional debut

Sporting positions
Regional boxing titles
New title	WBC Youth Silver light flyweight champion November 8, 2013 – July 2014; Vacated	Title discontinued
Preceded by Carlos Ortega	WBC Silver mini flyweight champion December 20, 2014 – April 2015; Vacated	Vacant Title next held by Janiel Rivera
Vacant Title last held by Pedro Guevara	WBC Silver light flyweight champion August 21, 2015 – February 2016; Vacated	Vacant
