= Manuel Vargas (boxer) =

Mexican boxer (born 1981)

Personal information
- Nickname: Chango
- Born: 29 March 1981 (age 45) Lagos de Moreno, Jalisco, Mexico
- Height: 1.54 m (5 ft 1 in)
- Weight: Flyweight; Light flyweight

Boxing career
- Stance: Orthodox

Boxing record
- Total fights: 44
- Wins: 32
- Win by KO: 16
- Losses: 11
- Draws: 1
- No contests: 0

Manuel Vargas (born 29 March 1981) is a Mexican former professional boxer who competed from 2000 to 2013. He held the interim WBO minimumweight title from 2008 to 2009.

== Professional career ==
=== Interim WBO Minimumweight title ===
Vargas became the interim WBO minimumweight title by beating the Colombian Daniel Reyes on 6 December 2008.

=== WBO Minimumweight title ===
He fought Donnie Nietes on 12 September 2009, for the full version of the WBO title. However, he lost the bout by split decision. He wanted to challenge Shaquille in boxing for the Shaq Versus.

=== Interim WBA Super Flyweight title ===
On 13 February 2010, Vargas moved up three divisions in order to challenge interim WBA super flyweight title holder Nonito Donaire on less than three days short notice and lost the bout by third-round knockout. In the post-fight drug test, has a son names oscar vargas Vargas tested positive for hydrocodone as was suspended for an indefinite period of time.

== Professional boxing record ==
44 fights	32 wins	11 losses
By knockout	16	5
By decision	16	6
Draws	1	

No.	Result	Record	Opponent	Type	Round, time	Date	Location	Notes
44	Loss	32–11–1	Francisco Rodríguez Jr.	TKO	3 (6), 0:44	26 January 2013	Auditorio del Bicentenario, Morelia, Mexico	
43	Loss	32–10–1	Johnny Garcia	UD	6	22 August 2012	Complejo Panamericano, Guadalajara, Mexico	
42	Win	32–9–1	Carlos Arturo Gonzales	KO	2 (?), 2:38	22 June 2012	Arena TKT Box Tour, Aguascalientes, Mexico	
41	Win	31–9–1	Javier Marquez Clemente	UD	8	28 April 2012	Deportivo Hugo Sánchez, Cuautitlán Izcalli, Mexico	
40	Loss	30–9–1	Luis Concepción	KO	1 (10), 1:16	11 August 2011	Arena Roberto Durán, Panama City, Panama	
39	Win	30–8–1	Javier Marquez Clemente	RTD	7 (10), 3:00	22 July 2011	Explanda de la Feria, San Luis Potosí, Mecico	
38	Loss	29–8–1	Román González	UD	12	19 March 2011	Plaza San Diego, San Pedro Cholula, Mexico	For WBA Light flyweight title
37	Loss	29–7–1	Giovani Segura	RTD	7 (10), 3:00	27 November 2010	Auditorio Municipal de Tijuana, Tijuana, Mexico	
36	Loss	29–6–1	Ramón García Hirales	MD	12	25 September 2010	El Foro, Tijuana, Mexico	For interim WBO light flyweight title
35	Win	29–5–1	Michael Arango	RTD	5 (10), 3:00	7 August 2010	Estadio Héctor Espino, Hermosillo, Mexico	
34	Win	28–5–1	Jesus Ricardo Armenta	TKO	1 (8), 1:49	2 July 2010	Auditorium Municipal de Tijuana, Tijuana, Mexico	
33	Loss	27–5–1	Nonito Donaire	KO	3 (12), 1:33	13 February 2010	Las Vegas Hilton, Paradise, Nevada, U.S.	For interim WBA super flyweight title
32	Loss	27–4–1	Donnie Nietes	SD	12	12 September 2009	Palenque de la Feria, Tepic, Mexico	For WBO mini flyweight title
31	Win	27–3–1	Walter Tello	UD	12	14 February 2009	Expo Forum, Hermosillo, Mexico	Retained interim WBO mini flyweight title
30	Win	26–3–1	Daniel Reyes	KO	4 (12), 0:56	6 December 2008	Palenque de la Feria, Lagos de Moreno, Mexico	Won interim WBO mini flyweight title
29	Draw	25–3–1	Lorenzo Trejo	PTS	8	19 July 2008	Explanada Tecate, Navojoa, Mexico	
28	Loss	25–3	Rayonta Whitfield	MD	12	9 April 2008	Bell Auditorium, Augusta, Georgia, U.S.	WBO flyweight title eliminator
27	Win	25–2	Julio Cesar Hernandez Morales	UD	6	29 September 2007	Gimnasio Rodrigo M. Quevedo, Chihuahua City, Mexico	
26	Win	24–2	Antonio Garibay	TKO	6 (10), 2:50	18 August 2007	Coliseo Olimpico de la UG, Guadalajara, Mexico	
25	Win	23–2	Juan Esquer	UD	12	19 March 2007	Auditorio Municipal, Ciudad Constitución, Mexico	WBC light flyweight title eliminator
24	Win	22–2	Valentin Leon	UD	10	16 December 2006	Plaza de Toros La Sinaloense, Culiacán, Mexico	
23	Win	21–2	Fred Heberto Valdez	UD	6	19 August 2006	Centro de Espectaculos Modelo, Ciudad Obregón, Mexico	
22	Win	20–2	Arnoldo Perez	KO	1 (8), 2:00	4 March 2006	Gimnasio de Mexicali, Mexicali, Mexico	
21	Win	19–2	Humberto Pool	UD	10	1 January 2006	Centro de Espectáculos Rancho Grande, Mexicali, Mexico	
20	Win	18–2	Diego Hernandez Bautista	KO	1 (8)	2 September 2005	Centro de Espectaculos Modelo, Ciudad Obregón, Mexico	
19	Win	17–2	Victor Orozco Mendoza	KO	2 (4)	17 June 2005	Arena Coliseo, Guadalajara, Mexico	
18	Win	16–2	Javier Angeles	UD	10	30 October 2004	Auditorio General Arteaga, Querétaro, Mexico	
17	Win	15–2	Francisco Garcia	UD	12	2 April 2004	Gimnasio de Mexicali, Mexicali, Mexico	Won vacant Mexican flyweight title
16	Win	14–2	Francisco Soto	TKO	2 (4)	22 November 2003	Centro de Espectaculos Alamar, Tijuana, Mexico	
15	Win	13–2	Christian Hernandez	TKO	3 (10)	3 November 2003	El Foro, Tijuana, Mexico	
14	Win	12–2	Paulino Villalobos	UD	12	30 May 2003	Auditorio Morelos, Aguascalientes, Mexico	Retained WBC Continental Americas light flyweight title
13	Win	11–2	Gilberto Keb Baas	KO	4 (10)	16 November 2002	Arena México, Mexico City, Mexico	
12	Win	10–2	Humberto Pool	UD	12	28 September 2002	Arena México, Mexico City, Mexico	Retained WBC Continental Americas light flyweight title
11	Win	9–2	Rodrigo Garcia	UD	12	13 July 2002	Arena México, Mexico City, Mexico	Won WBC Continental Americas light flyweight title
10	Win	8–2	Gonzalo Diaz Montalvo	TKO	5 (?)	4 May 2002	Mexico City, Distrito Federal, Mexico	
9	Win	7–2	Emilio Ahuelican	TKO	2 (?)	23 March 2002	Mexico City, Distrito Federal, Mexico	
8	Win	6–2	Oscar Murillo	UD	10	1 December 2001	Mexico City, Distrito Federal, Mexico	
7	Win	5–2	Édgar Sosa	TKO	8 (8)	3 November 2001	Arena México, Mexico City, Mexico	
6	Win	4–2	Victor Manuel Rojas	UD	8	1 September 2001	Mexico City, Distrito Federal, Mexico	
5	Win	3–2	Aaron Dominguez	UD	8	28 July 2001	Mexico City, Distrito Federal, Mexico	
4	Win	2–2	Mario Reyes	TKO	1 (4)	26 May 2001	Mexico City, Distrito Federal, Mexico	
3	Loss	1–2	Luis Angel Martinez	PTS	6	28 October 2000	Arena México, Mexico City, Mexico	
2	Win	1–1	Manuel Barrientos	PTS	6	5 August 2000	Arena México, Mexico City, Mexico	
1	Loss	0–1	Abel Ochoa	TKO	5 (6)	25 March 2000	Arena México, Mexico City, Mexico	

== See also ==
- List of WBO world champions

Achievements
New title	WBO minimumweight champion Interim Title; 6 December 2008 - 12 September 2009; Lost bid for full title	Vacant Title next held by Raul Garcia
