= Geles =

Geles can be a feminine given name or a surname. Notable people with the name include:

- Geles Cabrera (1926–2026), Mexican sculptor
- Omar Geles (1967–2024), Colombian accordion player and singer-songwriter
- Yeinny Geles (born 1997), Colombian weightlifter

== See also ==
- Jesús Géles (born 1988), Colombian boxer
