= Jorge Salazar =

Jorge Salazar Argüello (1939 – 1980), was a Nicaraguan coffee grower and popular leader of UPANIC (Union of Agricultural Producers of Nicaragua - Unión de Productores Agropecuarios de Nicaragua). Salazar seemed poised to become the leader of the opposition to the Sandinista government, until his death at the hands of State Security forces.

== History ==
Jorge Salazar was born on September 8, 1939, to Leopoldo Salazar Amador and Esmeralda "Meyaya" Argüello Cervantes; His father Leo, a captain in the National Guard, retired in 1941, and Jorge along with his two sisters grew up on the family's coffee farm at Santa María de Ostuma in the city of Matagalpa. He received his high school education at the Colegio Centroamérica in Granada and Culver Military Academy in the United States, then went to university in Brazil. He married Lucía Amada Cardenal Caldera, with whom he had four children, Karla Isabel, Jorge Leopoldo, Claudia, and Lucía.

During the fall of Somoza, Salazar had organized coffee farmers in Matagalpa and northern Zelaya into a cooperative, which stymied Sandinista efforts to absorb them into FSLN-sponsored organizations. As the most charismatic leader in the opposition, a wider audience began to rally around him. He became a key figure within the opposition Superior Council of Private Enterprise (Consejo Superior de la Empresa Privada - COSEP).

In mid-1980, he believed that he was in contact with dissident army officers who would help him oppose the leadership. On November 17, 1980, when Salazar arrived at the appointed location, Sandinista security forces arrived on the scene. Salazar was unarmed and alone, but according to Sandinista government reports, a shootout followed. In the end, Salazar was killed and a sack of false evidence in the form of small arms was thrown through the rear windshield of his Jeep Cherokee in order to incriminate him and his associates in the furor of press attention which followed.

== Aftermath ==
Salazar had already sent his family out of the country. After his death, his widow, Lucía Cardenal de Salazar, became a member of the political directorate of the Nicaraguan Democratic Force (FDN) on December 8, 1982. Later that month, the FDN formed Task Force Jorge Salazar, which would grow into the rebels' largest and most famous unit.

On October 18, 1984, COSEP adopted a motion to mark Jorge Salazar's birthday as Private Sector Day. Anti-Sandinista businessmen continued to honor the day, even after 1990 elections turned out the Sandinistas. On July 16, 2004, President Enrique Bolaños signed a decree officially establishing September 8 as the annual National Day of the Nicaraguan Entrepreneur (Día Nacional del Empresario Nicaragüense).

In post-Sandinista Nicaragua, his wife has served as Nicaragua's consul general in Miami, while his son Jorge has headed the Ministry of the Environment and Natural Resources. His daughter Lucía was briefly Minister of Tourism.
