= César Canchila =

Colombian boxer (born 1982)

Personal information
- Born: César Canchila Perez; 15 March 1982 (age 44) Montería, Colombia
- Height: 5 ft 4 in (163 cm)
- Weight: Light flyweight

Boxing career
- Reach: 66 in (168 cm)
- Stance: Orthodox

Boxing record
- Total fights: 38
- Wins: 33
- Win by KO: 25
- Losses: 5

César Canchila (born 15 March 1982) is a Colombian former professional boxer who competed from 2001 to 2014. He held the interim WBA light flyweight title from 2008 to 2009. At the regional level, he held the WBO Latino and WBA Fedelatin light flyweight titles.

== Professional career ==
Canchila was born in the small town of Cereté on 15 March 1982 and currently resides in Montería. On 26 July 2008, he captured the vacant WBA Interim Light Flyweight Title when he won a unanimous decision against the previously unbeaten Giovanni Segura in Las Vegas. Canchila would then lose the title in a rematch to Segura in his very next bout by 4th-round TKO on 14 March 2009.

In 2009 he took on the then unbeaten Filipino boxer Johnriel Casimero for the WBO's interim version of the light flyweight title. As with the second Segura bout Canchila lost this fight by TKO, this time in the 11th round.

He is managed by Colombian promoter Billy Chams and trained by Cartagena-born Orlando Pineda.

== Professional boxing record ==
38 fights	33 wins	5 losses
By knockout	25	5
By decision	8	0

No.	Result	Record	Opponent	Type	Round, time	Date	Location	Notes
38	Loss	33–5	Iván Morales	TKO	6 (8) 0:08	16 August 2014	Centro de Convenciones Azul, Zihuatanejo, Mexico	
37	Loss	33–4	Breilor Teran	TKO	6 (11)	1 November 2013	Coliseo Mario de León, Cereté, Colombia	For vacant WBA Fedelatin super-flyweight title
36	Win	33–3	Luis Alberto Zarraga	UD	10	2 August 2013	Coliseo Mario de León, Cereté, Colombia	
35	Win	32–3	Luis Felipe Cuadrado	TKO	4 (8) 0:25	11 May 2013	Coliseo Mario de León, Cereté, Colombia	
34	Win	31–3	Wilfrido Lans	KO	1 (6) 1:35	19 April 2013	Coliseo del Colegio Biffi La Salle, Barranquilla, Colombia	
33	Win	30–3	Alfonso De la Hoz	UD	8	24 June 2011	Coliseo Elías Chegwin, Barranquilla, Colombia	
32	Win	29–3	Nelson Cantero	TKO	4 (8) 0:29	15 April 2011	Centro Recreacional Las Vegas, Barranquilla, Colombia	
31	Loss	28–3	John Riel Casimero	TKO	11 (12) 1:40	19 December 2009	Estadio Nacional, Managua, Nicaragua	For WBO Interim light-flyweight title
30	Win	28–2	Carlos Luis Campos	TKO	5 (10) 2:22	17 July 2009	Coliseo Miguel "Happy" Lora, Montería, Colombia	
29	Loss	27–2	Giovani Segura	TKO	4 (12) 2:59	14 March 2009	Centro de Espectáculos Promocasa, Mexicali, Mexico	Lost WBA Interim light-flyweight title
28	Win	27–1	Giovani Segura	UD	12	26 July 2008	MGM Grand Garden Arena, Paradise, Nevada, U.S.	Won WBA Interim light-flyweight title
27	Win	26–1	Deivis Narvaez	KO	2 (10)	3 April 2008	Centro Recreacional Las Vegas, Barranquilla, Colombia	
26	Win	25–1	Jose Humberto Caraballo	KO	2 (8)	30 November 2007	Coliseo Elías Chegwin, Barranquilla, Colombia	
25	Win	24–1	Michael Arango	TKO	4 (10)	1 September 2007	Salon Jumbo del Country Club, Barranquilla, Colombia	
24	Win	23–1	Wilson Cortina	KO	1 (10)	19 July 2007	Coliseo Elías Chegwin, Barranquilla, Colombia	
23	Win	22–1	Miguel Tellez	TKO	12 (12)	2 March 2007	Romelio Martínez Stadium, Barranquilla, Colombia	Won vacant WBA Fedelatin light-flyweight title
22	Win	21–1	Victor Peralta	KO	3 (10)	21 January 2007	Centro de Cultura Física, Barranquilla, Colombia	
21	Win	20–1	Darwin Zambrano	KO	5 (10)	15 December 2006	Coliseo Municipal, Valledupar, Colombia	
20	Win	19–1	Gustavo Vera	KO	1 (10) 2:17	21 October 2006	Coliseo Elías Chegwin, Barranquilla, Colombia	Won vacant WBO Latino light-flyweight title
19	Win	18–1	Juan Carlos Castillo	KO	7 (10)	16 September 2006	Romelio Martínez Stadium, Barranquilla, Colombia	
18	Win	17–1	Nelson Cantero	TKO	7 (8)	30 June 2006	Coliseo Elías Chegwin, Barranquilla, Colombia	
17	Win	16–1	Elkin Zavaleta	PTS	8	12 May 2006	Centro Recreacional Las Vegas, Barranquilla, Colombia	
16	Win	15–1	Antonio Maria Cochero Diaz	TKO	9 (10)	27 April 2006	Discoteca El Escandalo, Cartagena, Colombia	
15	Win	14–1	Edwin Diaz	TKO	5 (10)	23 February 2006	Discoteca El Escandalo, Cartagena, Colombia	
14	Win	13–1	Luis Salgado	KO	1 (6)	16 December 2005	Coliseo Municipal, Puerto Colombia, Colombia	
13	Win	12–1	Alfonso De la Hoz	PTS	8	1 December 2005	Cartagena, Colombia	
12	Win	11–1	Yorki Herrera	KO	5 (6)	21 October 2005	Club Los Bucaros, Barranquilla, Colombia	
11	Win	10–1	Emerson Nisperusa	KO	3 (6)	30 September 2005	Polideportivo San Felipe, Barranquilla, Colombia	
10	Win	9–1	Joel Garcia	KO	5 (?)	12 March 2005	San Pelayo, Colombia	
9	Win	8–1	Felipe Almanza	KO	8 (?)	10 October 2004	Colombia	
8	Loss	7–1	Michael Arango	TKO	4 (8)	17 December 2003	San Andrés, Colombia	
7	Win	7–0	Farid Cassiani	KO	3 (?)	6 December 2002	Montería, Colombia	
6	Win	6–0	Jesus Jose Ospino	UD	10	5 October 2002	Montería, Colombia	Won Colombian light-flyweight title
5	Win	5–0	Jose Humberto Caraballo	KO	3 (?)	30 April 2002	Montería, Colombia	
4	Win	4–0	Manuel Ladeus	KO	4 (?)	5 October 2001	Cereté, Colombia	
3	Win	3–0	Alfonso De la Rosa	PTS	6	31 August 2001	Montería, Colombia	
2	Win	2–0	Dairo Rodriguez	KO	2 (4)	27 July 2001	Cartagena, Colombia	
1	Win	1–0	Antonio Maria Cochero Diaz	PTS	4	8 June 2001	Colombia	

Sporting positions
Regional boxing titles
Preceded by Jesus Jose Ospino	Colombian light-flyweight champion 5 October 2002 – 2003; Vacated	Vacant Title next held by Wilfrido Váldez
Vacant Title last held by Gerardo Verde Moreno	WBO Latino light-flyweight champion 21 October 2006 – 2007; Vacated	Vacant Title next held by Kermin Guardia
Vacant Title last held by Juan Carlos Reveco	WBA Fedelatin light-flyweight champion 2 March 2007 – 2007; Vacated	Vacant Title next held by Daniel Reyes
World boxing titles
Vacant Title last held by Beibis Mendoza	WBA light-flyweight champion Interim title 26 July 2008 – 14 March 2009	Succeeded by Giovani Segura
