= Selva Negra Mountain Resort =

Coordinates: 12.998927°N 85.909777°W

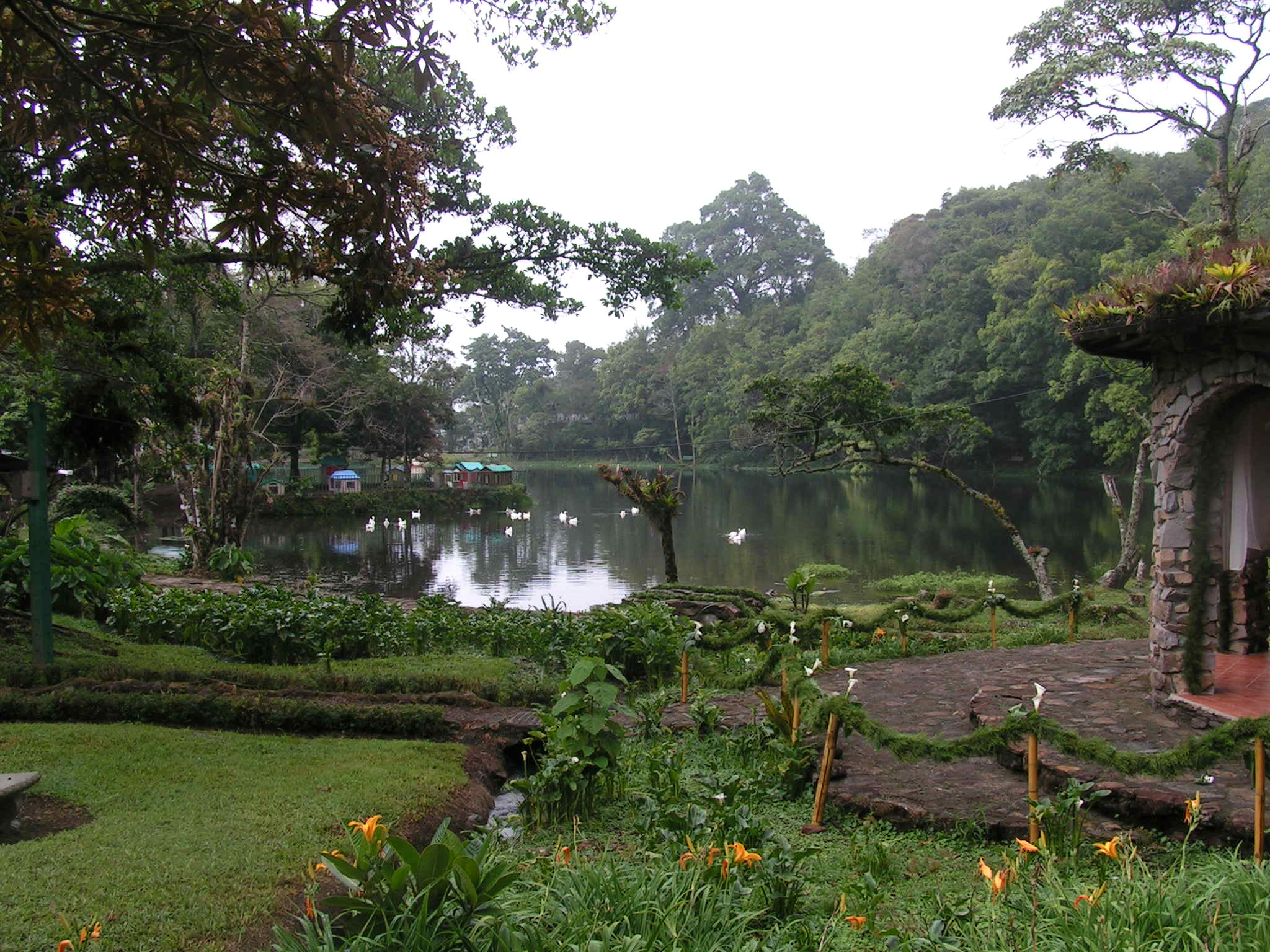
- Interactive map of Selva Negra Mountain Resort

Selva Negra Mountain Resort and Coffee Estate is a historical coffee farm founded in 1891 by German immigrants. Since 1976 it has also been a tourist resort. It is located in the department of Matagalpa, Nicaragua, just 11 kilometres (7 mi) from the city of Matagalpa. According to Fodor's, Selva Negra is "arguably Nicaragua's most famous hotel," and proprietor Eddy Kühl is "a personal friend of many of the country's power brokers.".

It is adjacent to Selva Negra Cloud Forest Reserve.

== History ==
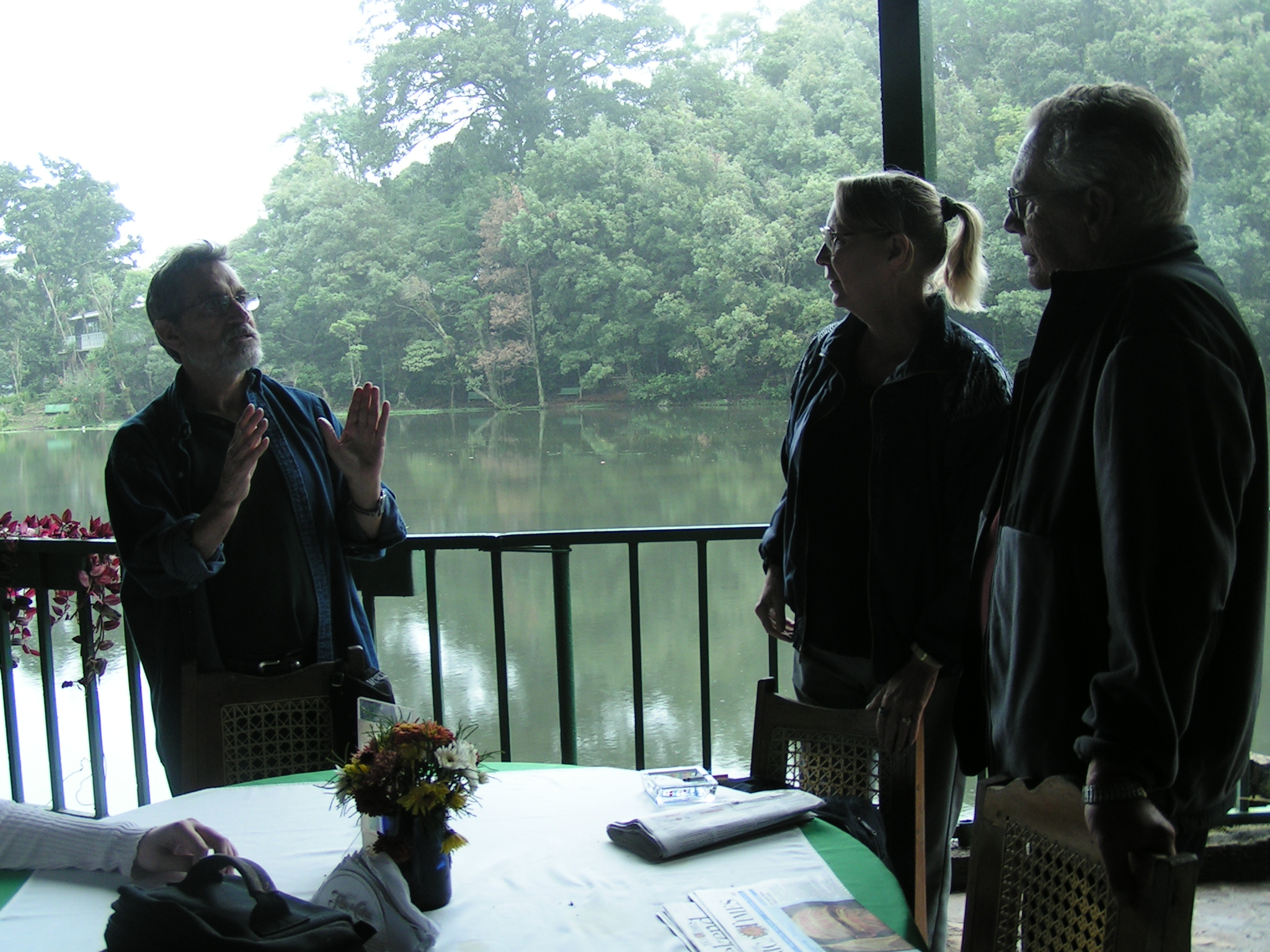
Eddy Kühl with American guests.

In the 1850s when gold was discovered in California, many American and European passengers made their way to California crossing the Isthmus of Central America through Nicaragua. On one of those trips, a German couple (Ludwig Elster and Katharina Braun) from the region named Black Forest (Selva Negra in Spanish) in Germany chose to stay in Nicaragua rather than continue to San Francisco. Instead of looking for gold they planted the first coffee beans in this region. Coffee came to be of very good quality, so soon many other Europeans and Americans showed up to do the same.

One hundred years later a new couple, Eddy Kühl and Mausi Hayn, descendants of the first settlers, thought of building a tourist resort in the same area to recreate the dream of the first settlers. The scenic mountains already drew visitors to the nearby Hotel Santa María de Ostuma. The resort was finally completed between 1975 and 1976. They built, all German style: 23 mountain bungalows, an additional building with 14 hotel rooms, a youth hostel, bar and restaurant, conference rooms, and a rustic non-denominational chapel.

The activities are all eco-touristic: mountain hiking, horseback riding, birdwatching, and tours of the coffee plantation. The farm is well known for protecting the forest, birds, and wildlife sanctuary. Kühl has also devoted himself to preserving and recording the region's history.

== Gallery ==
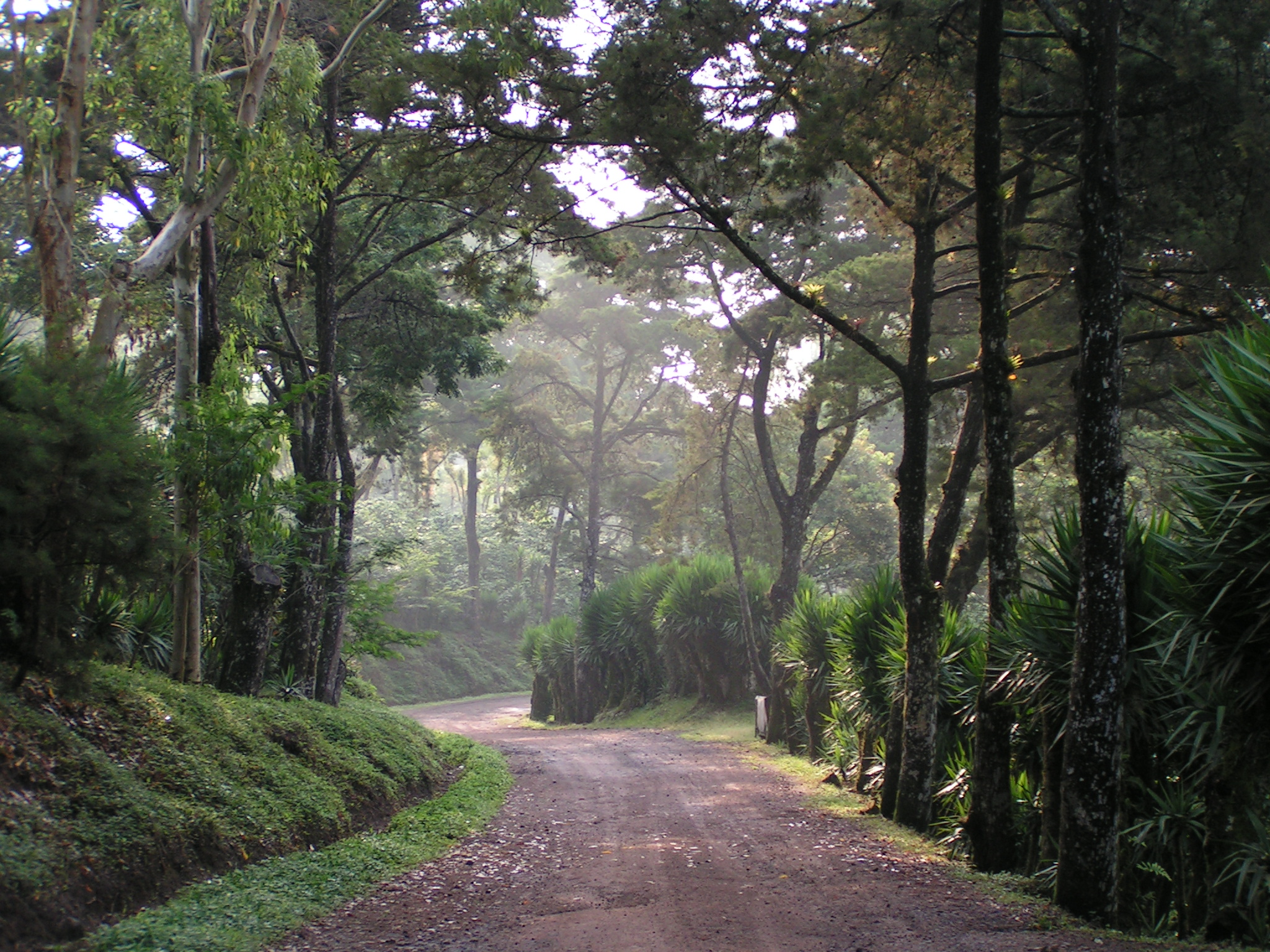
Fairy-tale like entrance to Selva Negra

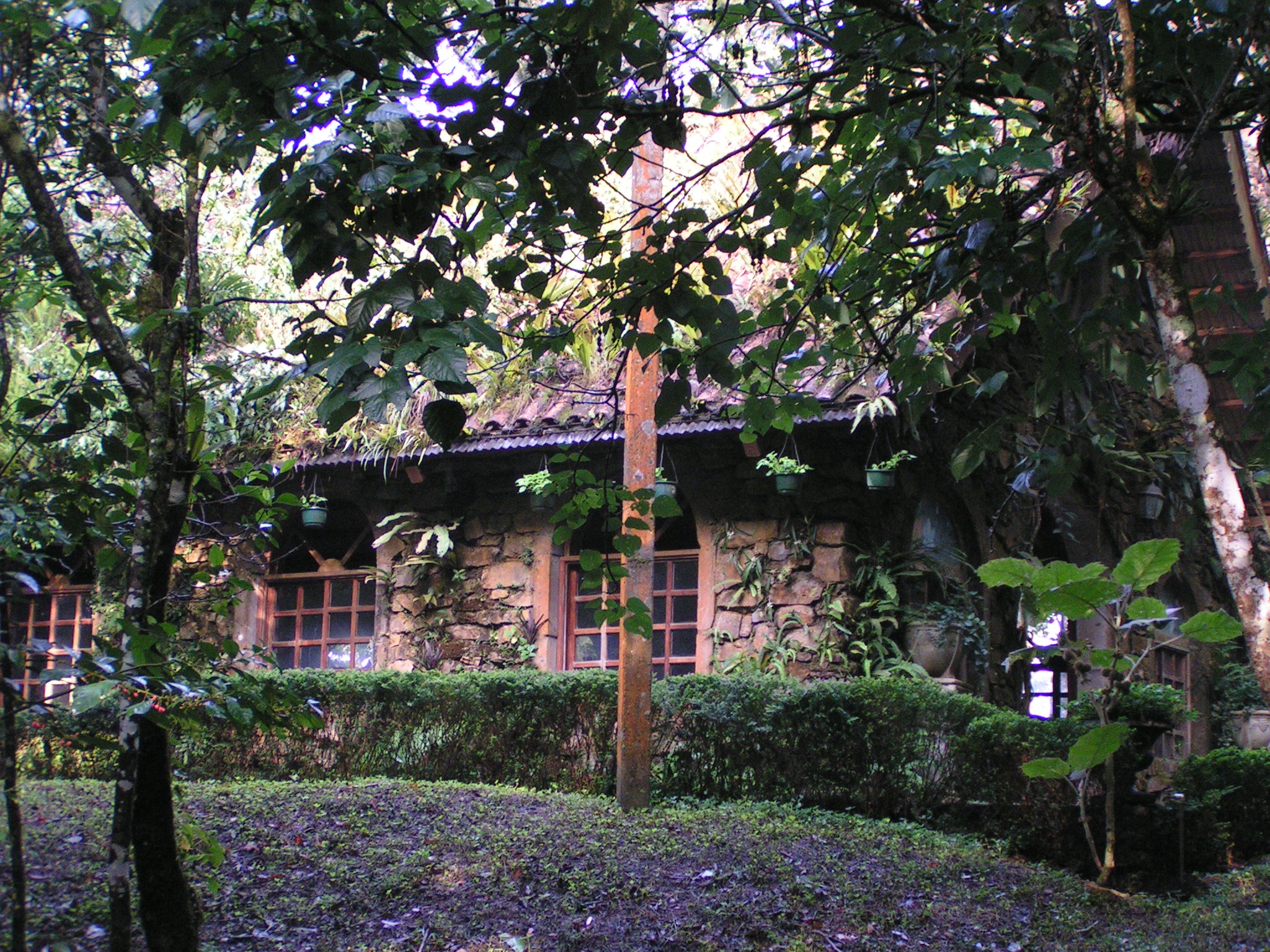
chapel

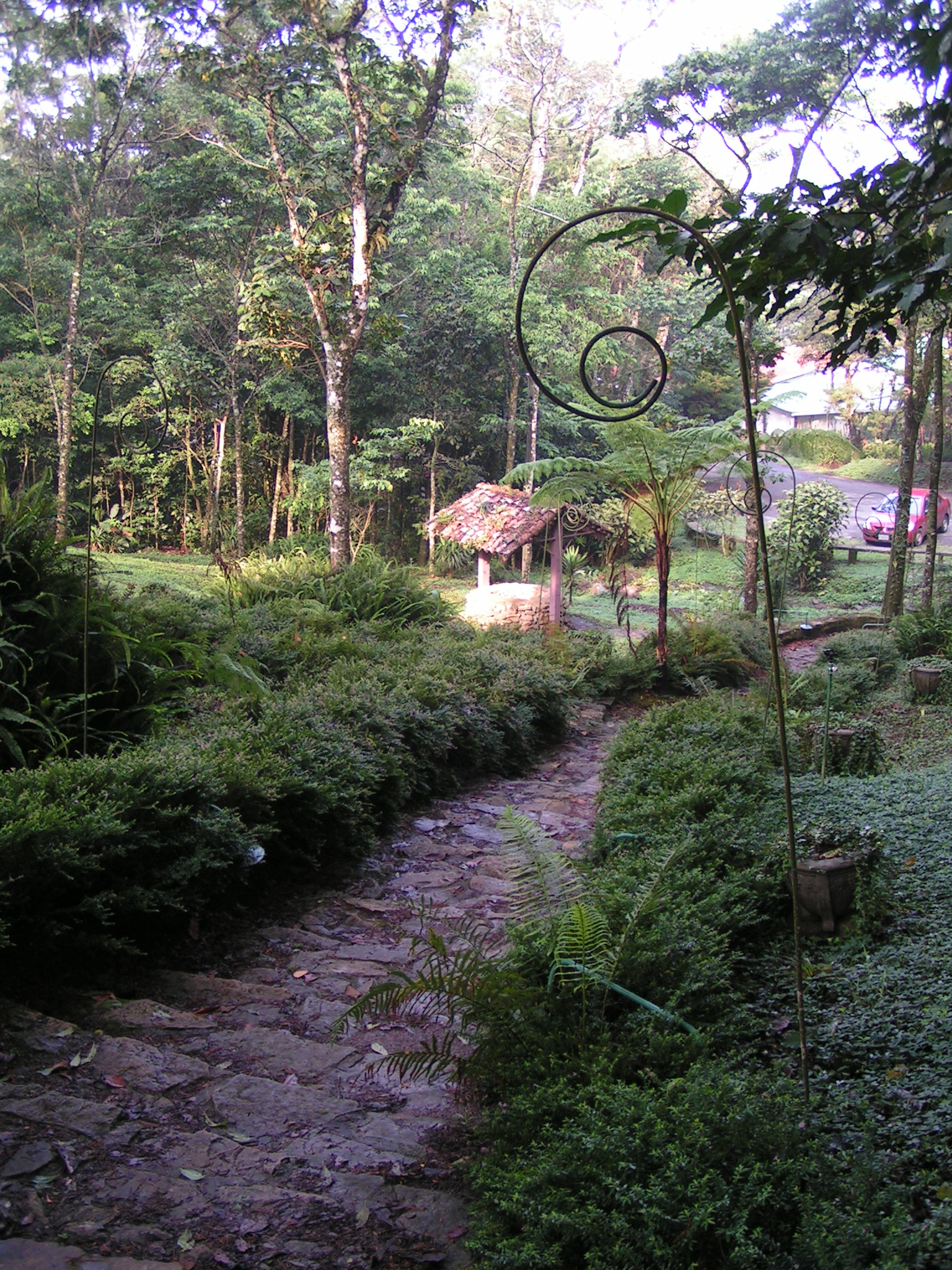
Path from chapel

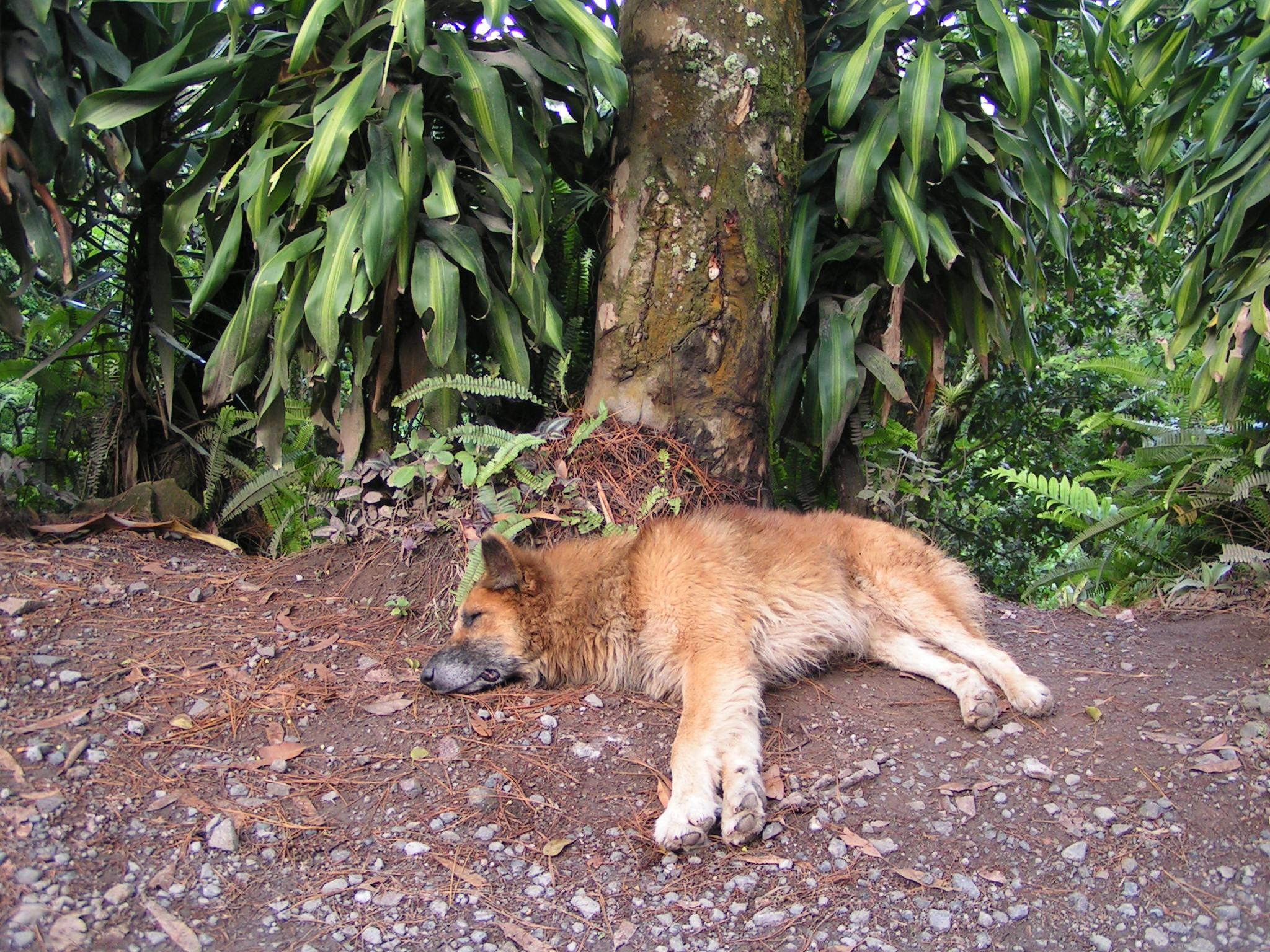
The resort's ever-alert security dog

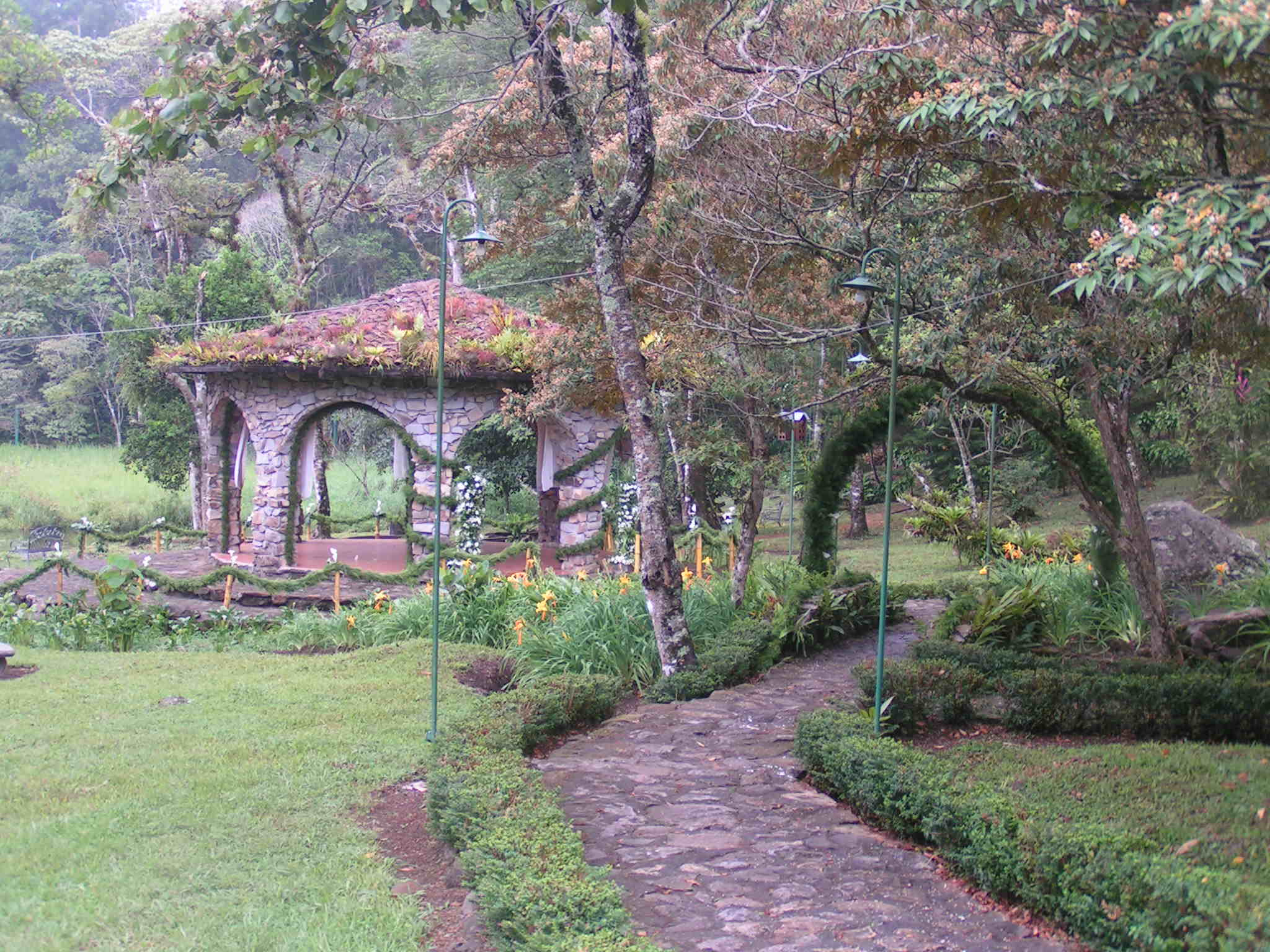
gazebo

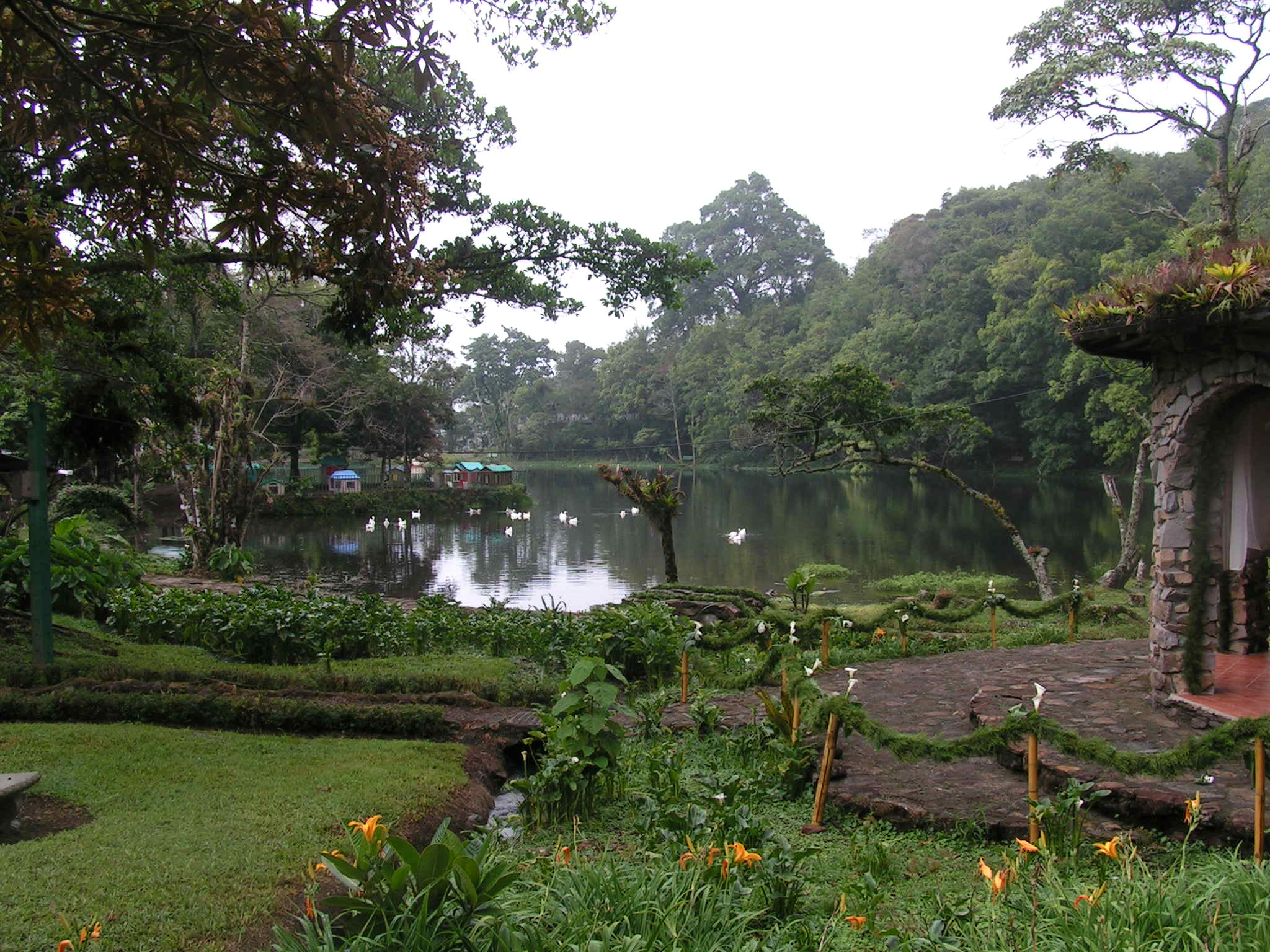
another shot from gazebo
