= Carlos Ortega (boxer) =

Panamanian boxer

Personal information
- Nickname: La Aranita (Little Spider)
- Born: Carlos Alexis Ortega Badillo; July 25, 1989 (age 36) La Chorrera, Panama
- Height: 5 ft 3 in (160 cm)
- Weight: Mini-flyweight; Light-flyweight

Boxing career
- Reach: 73 in (185 cm)

Boxing record
- Total fights: 25
- Wins: 15
- Win by KO: 6
- Losses: 7
- Draws: 3

Carlos Ortega (born 25 July 1989) is a Panamanian professional boxer who has been ranked as the world #1 mini-flyweight by the WBC.

== Professional career ==
On August 23, 2014, Ortega defeated Leroy Estrada by twelfth round unanimous decision to win the vacant WBC Silver mini-flyweight title.

== Professional boxing record ==
25 fights	15 wins	7 losses
By knockout	6	2
By decision	9	5
Draws	3	

No.	Result	Record	Opponent	Type	Round, time	Date	Location	Notes
25	Loss	15–7–3	René Santiago	TKO	9 (10), 1:28	Apr 14, 2023	Coliseo de Combates, Panama City, Panama	For WBO Latino light flyweight title
24	Win	15–6–3	Victor Berrio	RTD	2 (8), 3:00	May 20, 2022	Arena Panama Al Brown, Colon City, Panama	
23	Loss	14–6–3	Leyman Benavides	UD	12	Feb 7, 2020	Roberto Durán Arena, Panama City, Panama	
22	Draw	14–5–3	Johnny Garay	SD	8	Mar 14, 2019	Fantastic Casino de Albrook Mall, Panama City, Panama	
21	Win	14–5–2	Jesus Santos	UD	6	Aug 23, 2018	Fantastic Casino de Albrook Mall, Panama City, Panama	
20	Win	13–5–2	Amrit Herrera	KO	3 (8), 2:23	Dec 6, 2017	Los Andes Mall, Panama City, Panama	
19	Win	12–5–2	Johnny Garay	UD	8	Oct 14, 2017	Los Andes Mall, Panama City, Panama	
18	Loss	11–5–2	Byron Rojas	UD	8	Jun 30, 2017	Nuevo Gimnasio Nicarao, Managua, Nicaragua	
17	Win	11–4–2	Argenis Cheremo	UD	6	Feb 16, 2017	Hotel El Panama, Panama City, Panama	
16	Loss	10–4–2	Ricardo Perez	TKO	9 (12), 0:44	Dec 20, 2014	Arena Quequi, Cancún, Mexico	Lost WBC Silver mini flyweight title
15	Win	10–3–2	Leroy Estrada	UD	12	Aug 23, 2014	Roberto Durán Arena, Panama City, Panama	Won vacant WBC Silver mini flyweight title
14	Win	9–3–2	Gilberto Pedroza	UD	10	Mar 22, 2014	Roberto Durán Arena, Panama City, Panama	Won WBC FECARBOX mini flyweight title
13	Draw	8–3–2	Gilberto Pedroza	SD	8	Jan 16, 2014	Fantastic Casino de Albrook Mall, Panama City, Panama	For WBC FECARBOX and Panamanian mini flyweight titles
12	Draw	8–3–1	Carlos Ariel Farias	MD	6	Oct 12, 2013	Polideportivo Gustavo Toro Rodriguez, San Martín, Argentina	
11	Loss	8–3	Mercedes Concepcion	UD	10	Jun 22, 2013	Gimnasio Los Naranjos, Boquete, Panama	For vacant WBC Latino light flyweight title
10	Loss	8–2	Walter Tello	MD	8	Dec 1, 2012	Gimnasio Los Naranjos, Boquete, Panama	
9	Win	8–1	Erick Flores	UD	8	Apr 26, 2012	Roberto Durán Arena, Panama City, Panama	
8	Loss	7–1	Walter Tello	UD	8	Jul 2, 2011	Feria de San Jose, David, Panama	
7	Win	7–0	Jesus Santos	KO	3 (6), 0:58	Feb 1, 2011	Hotel Veneto, Panama City, Panama	
6	Win	6–0	Julio Canastuj	MD	6	Aug 14, 2010	Roberto Durán Arena, Panama City, Panama	
5	Win	5–0	Jesus Santos	SD	6	Jan 21, 2010	Atlapa Convention Centre, Panama City, Panama	
4	Win	4–0	Leonel Sandoval	TKO	3 (4), 1:34	Oct 29, 2009	Fantastic Casino, 24 de Diciembre, Panama	
3	Win	3–0	Julio Canastuj	UD	4	Jul 24, 2009	Gimnasio Municipal, Natá, Panama	
2	Win	2–0	Johnatan Espinoza	TKO	2 (4), 2:11	Apr 4, 2009	Gimnasio Los Naranjos, Boquete, Panama	
1	Win	1–0	Jaime Gonzalez	TKO	2 (4), 2:42	Aug 22, 2008	Gimnasio Yuyin Luzcando, Betania, Panama	

Sporting positions
Regional boxing titles
Preceded by Gilberto Pedroza	WBC FECARBOX mini-flyweight champion March 22, 2014 – August 23, 2014; Won Silver title	Title discontinued
Vacant Title last held by Janiel Rivera	WBC Silver mini-flyweight champion August 23, 2014 – December 20, 2014	Succeeded by Ricardo Perez
