= Giovani Segura =

Mexican boxer

Personal information
- Nickname: El Guerrero Azteca
- Born: Giovani Segura Aguilar; 1 April 1982 (age 44) Ciudad Altamirano, Mexico
- Height: 1.60 m (5 ft 3 in)
- Weight: Light flyweight; Flyweight

Boxing career
- Reach: 168 cm (66 in)
- Stance: Southpaw

Boxing record
- Total fights: 38
- Wins: 33
- Win by KO: 29
- Losses: 4
- Draws: 1

Giovani Segura Aguilar (born 1 April 1982) is a former Mexican professional boxer. He is a former WBA, WBO, Lineal and The Ring magazine light flyweight champion.

== Amateur career ==
Giovani began boxing at the age of 15. In 2000 he moved to Bell, CA where he trained at the Azteca Boxing Gym under the tutelage of Lucilo Nolasco. By the time he had 4 amateur bouts he was matched against opponents with 60 to 100 bouts.

He amassed an amateur record of 38–4. Despite the claim of an amateur record of 38–4, he reported that he only had a record of 13–2.

== Professional career ==
Segura made his professional debut on 28 March 2003. He accumulated a record of 18–0–1, which included wins against future champion Carlos Tamara and former champion Daniel Reyes.

=== WBA Light Flyweight Champion ===
Giovanni challenged Colombian César Canchila for the Interim WBA Light Flyweight title. Segura lost the bout by unanimous decision, but subsequently claimed the interim title by knocking out Canchila in a rematch on 14 March 2009.

He was elevated to full champion on 5 June 2009. Segura defended his newly acquired title on 25 July 2009, by stopping Juanito Rubillar in six rounds. On 21 November 2009, he defended his title against Sonny Boy Jaro by first round knock out. On 20 February 2010, he defended his title for a third time against Walter Tello.

=== Segura vs. Calderon I & II ===
On 28 August 2010, Giovani fought undefeated WBO Light Flyweight champion Iván Calderón in a unification bout. Segura went on to knock out Calderón in the eighth round, successfully unifying his WBA title with the Puerto Rican's WBO and Lineal Light Flyweight Championships. In his next fight, he defeated former champion Manuel Vargas via 7th round stoppage.

Segura and Iván Calderón would meet again in April 2011. Segura won the rematch by third-round knockout. Following that victory, Segura vacated his titles in order to move up to the Flyweight division where he was KO by Brian Viloria.

== Professional boxing record ==
| 38 fights | 33 wins | 4 losses |
|---|---|---|
| By knockout | 29 | 2 |
| By decision | 4 | 2 |
| Draws | 1 | |

| No. | Result | Record | Opponent | Type | Round, time | Date | Location | Notes |
|---|---|---|---|---|---|---|---|---|
| 38 | Win | 33–4–1 | Ernesto Guerrero | KO | 3 (8) | 18 June 2016 | Commerce Casino, Commerce, California, U.S. | |
| 37 | Loss | 32–4–1 | Juan Francisco Estrada | TKO | 11 (12) | 6 September 2014 | Mexico City Arena, Mexico City, Mexico | For WBA (Super) and WBO flyweight titles |
| 36 | Win | 32–3–1 | Felipe Salguero | TKO | 10 (10) | 5 April 2014 | Arena Tecate, Tijuana, Mexico | |
| 35 | Win | 31–3–1 | Hernán Márquez | KO | 12 (12) | 2 November 2013 | Centro de Usos Múltiples, Hermosillo, Mexico | |
| 34 | Win | 30–3–1 | Jonathan Gonzalez | KO | 4 (10) | 17 August 2013 | El San Juan Resort and Casino, Isla Verde, Puerto Rico | Won WBO interim Latino flyweight title |
| 33 | Loss | 29–3–1 | Edgar Sosa | UD | 12 | 18 May 2013 | Zitácuaro, Mexico | For WBC Silver flyweight title |
| 32 | Win | 29–2–1 | Omar Salado | TKO | 9 (10) | 23 Feb 2013 | Hermosillo, Mexico | |
| 31 | Loss | 28–2–1 | Brian Viloria | TKO | 8 (12) | 10 Dec 2011 | Manila, Philippines | For WBO flyweight title |
| 30 | Win | 28–1–1 | Eddy Zuniga | TKO | 1 (10) | 28 May 2011 | Musica Hall, Toluca, Mexico | |
| 29 | Win | 27–1–1 | Iván Calderón | KO | 3 (12) | 2 Apr 2011 | Auditorio del Estado, Mexicali, Mexico | Retained WBO and The Ring light flyweight titles |
| 28 | Win | 26–1–1 | Manuel Vargas | RTD | 7 (10) | 27 Nov 2010 | Tijuana, Mexico | |
| 27 | Win | 25–1–1 | Iván Calderón | KO | 8 (12) | 28 August 2010 | Coliseo Mario Morales, Guaynabo, Puerto Rico | Retained WBA (Unified) light flyweight title; Won WBO and The Ring light flyweight titles |
| 26 | Win | 24–1–1 | Ronald Ramos | RTD | 4 (10) | 27 Apr 2010 | Pueblo Antiguo, Ensenada, Mexico | |
| 25 | Win | 23–1–1 | Walter Tello | TKO | 3 (12) | 20 Feb 2010 | Discoteca El Alebrije, Acapulco, Mexico | Retained WBA light flyweight title |
| 24 | Win | 22–1–1 | Sonny Boy Jaro | KO | 1 (12) | 21 November 2009 | IXMLTUIL, Mérida, Mérida, Mexico | Retained WBA light flyweight title |
| 23 | Win | 21–1–1 | Juanito Rubillar | TKO | 6 (12) | 25 July 2009 | Grand Mayan, Nuevo Vallarta, Mexico | Retained WBA light flyweight title |
| 22 | Win | 20–1–1 | César Canchila | TKO | 4 (12) | 14 April 2009 | Palenque del FEX, Mexicali, Mexico | Won WBA interim light flyweight title |
| 21 | Loss | 19–1–1 | César Canchila | UD | 12 | 26 Jul 2008 | MGM Grand, Paradise, Nevada, U.S. | For WBA interim light flyweight title |
| 20 | Win | 19–0–1 | Wilfrido Valdez | KO | 1 (10) | 26 October 2007 | Cicero Stadium, Cicero, Illinois, U.S. | Retained NABF light flyweight title |
| 19 | Win | 18–0–1 | Daniel Reyes | KO | 1 (12) | 8 Jun 2007 | Hudson & Campbell Center, Gary, Indiana, U.S. | Retained NABF light flyweight title |
| 18 | Win | 17–0–1 | Jesus Martinez | TKO | 5 (12) | 16 Feb 2007 | Cicero Stadium, Cicero, Illinois, U.S. | Retained NABF light flyweight title |
| 17 | Win | 16–0–1 | Carlos Tamara | UD | 12 | 3 November 2006 | Palo Duro Golf Club, Nogales, Arizona, U.S. | Won NABF light flyweight title |
| 16 | Win | 15–0–1 | Jair Jimenez | TKO | 4 (12) | 18 September 2006 | Pasadena Convention Center, Pasadena, Texas, U.S. | Won vacant IBA light flyweight title |
| 15 | Win | 14–0–1 | Valentin Leon | KO | 3 (10) | 5 May 2006 | Activities Center, Maywood, California, U.S. | |
| 14 | Win | 13–0–1 | Francisco Arce | TKO | 1 (8) | 3 March 2006 | Activities Center, Maywood, California, U.S. | |
| 13 | Win | 12–0–1 | Juan Carlos Perez | KO | 1 (8) | 20 January 2006 | Activities Center, Maywood, California, U.S. | |
| 12 | Win | 11–0–1 | Benjamin Garcia | SD | 8 | 25 November 2005 | Santa Ana Star Casino, Bernalillo, New Mexico, U.S. | |
| 11 | Win | 10–0–1 | Juan Javier Lagos | KO | 6 (8) | 7 Oct 2005 | The Aladdin, Paradise, Nevada, U.S. | |
| 10 | Win | 9–0–1 | Francisco Soto | TKO | 5 (8) | 18 Jun 2005 | Activity Center, Maywood, California, U.S. | Retained California State flyweight title |
| 9 | Win | 8–0–1 | Roberto Gomez | TKO | 4 (6) | 6 May 2005 | Fort McDowell Casino, Fountain Hills, Arizona, U.S. | |
| 8 | Win | 7–0–1 | Felipe Rivas | UD | 6 | 26 November 2004 | Plaza Hotel & Casino, Las Vegas, Nevada, U.S. | |
| 7 | Win | 6–0–1 | Jose Antonio Rico | TKO | 1 (8) | 23 April 2004 | Ramada Inn, Norwalk, California, U.S. | Won California State flyweight title |
| 6 | Win | 5–0–1 | Saidi Warandu | TKO | 1 (4) | 20 Jan 2004 | Ramada Inn, Norwalk, California, U.S. | |
| 5 | Win | 4–0–1 | Mynor Marquez | TKO | 1 (4) | 6 Dec 2003 | Activities Center, Maywood, California, U.S. | |
| 4 | Win | 3–0–1 | Vicente Maroquin | KO | 1 (4) | 21 November 2003 | Club Ibiza, Whittier, California, U.S. | |
| 3 | Win | 2–0–1 | Benjamin Garcia | KO | 1 (4) | 19 July 2003 | Bicycle Club, Bell Gardens, California, U.S. | |
| 2 | Draw | 1–0–1 | Benjamin Garcia | SD | 4 | 5 July 2003 | Del Mar Racetrack, Del Mar, California, U.S. | |
| 1 | Win | 1–0 | Jesus Valadez | UD | 4 | 28 March 2003 | Bicycle Club, Bell Gardens, California, U.S. | |

== See also ==
- List of Mexican boxing world champions
- List of world light-flyweight boxing champions

Sporting positions
World boxing titles
| Preceded by César Canchila | WBA light flyweight champion Interim Title; 14 March 2009 – 5 June 2009; Promoted | Vacant Title next held by Juan Carlos Reveco |
| Preceded by Brahim Asloum; Status Changed | WBA light flyweight champion 5 June 2009 – 28 August 2010; Status changed to Unified Champion | Succeeded by Juan Carlos Reveco; Interim Champion promoted as Regular champion |
| New title | WBA light flyweight champion Unified Title; 28 August 2010 – 26 November 2010; Vacated | Vacant Title next held by Román González |
| Preceded by Iván Calderón | WBO light flyweight champion 28 August 2010 – 22 April 2011; Vacated | Succeeded by Jesús Géles; Interim Champ promoted |
| Preceded by Iván Calderón | The Ring light flyweight champion 28 August 2010 – 12 September 2011; Vacated | Vacant Title next held by Donnie Nietes |
Awards
| Previous: Juan Manuel Márquez vs. Juan Díaz | The Ring Fight of the Year vs. Iván Calderón; 2010 | Next: Andre Berto vs. Victor Ortiz |
