= Ramón García Hirales =

Mexican boxer

Personal information
- Nickname: Cuate
- Born: 10 September 1982 (age 43) La Paz, Baja California Sur, Mexico
- Height: 5 ft 8 in (174 cm)
- Weight: Light flyweight

Boxing career
- Reach: 70 in (180 cm)
- Stance: Orthodox

Boxing record
- Total fights: 30
- Wins: 20
- Win by KO: 12
- Losses: 9
- Draws: 1

Ramón García Hirales (born 10 September 1982) is a Mexican professional boxer who held the WBO light flyweight title in 2011. He is the twin brother of ex-WBO and IBF minimumweight world champion Raúl García.

== Professional career ==
=== Interim WBO Light Flyweight title ===
On July 24, 2010 Hirales won the interim WBO Light Flyweight title by beating titleholder Johnriel Casimero from the Philippines in a twelve rounds decision.

He defended his title against Manuel Vargas by majority decision. He lost the interim title to Jesús Géles by split decision.

=== WBO Light Flyweight title ===
On April 30, 2011, he faced Géles in a rematch for the full WBO light flyweight title. Garcia-Hirales won the bout by fourth round knock out to become the world champion. Garcia-Hirales and his brother Raul made history on this night when they became the first set of twin brothers to win world titles on the same card.

== Professional boxing record ==
30 fights	20 wins	9 losses
By knockout	12	2
By decision	8	7
Draws	1	

No.	Result	Record	Opponent	Type	Round, time	Date	Location	Notes
30	Loss	20–9–1	Israel González	UD	10	29 Oct 2016	Auditorio Municipal, Cabo San Lucas, Mexico	
29	Loss	20–8–1	Francisco Rodríguez Jr.	UD	10	20 Feb 2016	Arena José Sulaimán, Monterrey, Mexico	
28	Loss	20–7–1	Juan Hernández	UD	8	15 Aug 2015	Estadio de Beisbol Alberto Vega Chavez, Guamúchil, Mexico	
27	Loss	20–6–1	Jonathan Taconing	TKO	10 (10), 2:53	4 Apr 2015	Unidad Deportiva Martín Alarcón, Metepec, Mexico	
26	Loss	20–5–1	Javier Mendoza	UD	12	20 Sep 2014	Auditorio Municipal Fausto Gutiérrez Moreno, Tijuana, Mexico	For vacant IBF light flyweight title
25	Win	20–4–1	Lionel Mark Duran	PTS	12	11 Jan 2014	Auditorio Benito Juarez, Veracruz, Mexico	
24	Win	19–4–1	Jose Antonio Jimenez	RTD	3 (10), 0:10	5 Oct 2013	Salón de Usos Múltiples, Ocotlán, Mexico	
23	Win	18–4–1	Ruben Oropeza	KO	8 (12), 2:16	13 Jul 2013	Centro de Convenciones, León, Mexico	
22	Win	17–4–1	Jose Guadalupe Martinez	TKO	3 (10), 0:33	22 Mar 2013	Arena California, La Paz, Mexico	
21	Loss	16–4–1	Román González	KO	4 (12), 2:09	28 Apr 2012	Fairplex, Pomona, California, U.S.	For WBA light flyweight title
20	Loss	16–3–1	Donnie Nietes	UD	12	8 Oct 2011	University of St. La Salle Gymnasium, Bacolod, Philippines	Lost WBO light flyweight title
19	Win	16–2–1	Jesús Géles	KO	4 (12), 1:15	30 Apr 2011	Foro Polanco, Mexico City, Mexico	Won WBO light flyweight title
18	Loss	15–2–1	Jesús Géles	SD	12	5 Feb 2011	Coliseo Bernardo Caraballo, Cartagena, Colombia	Lost WBO interim light flyweight title
17	Win	15–1–1	Omar Soto	UD	12	18 Dec 2010	Estadio 20 de Noviembre, Campeche, Mexico	Retained WBO interim light flyweight title
16	Win	14–1–1	Manuel Vargas	MD	12	25 Sep 2010	El Foro, Tijuana, Mexico	Retained WBO interim light flyweight title
15	Win	13–1–1	Johnriel Casimero	SD	12	24 Jul 2010	Polideportivo Centenario, Los Mochis, Mexico	Won WBO interim light flyweight title
14	Win	12–1–1	Michael Arango	TKO	2 (12), 2:15	13 Feb 2010	Gimnasio Auditorio, Los Cabos, Mexico	Retained WBC International light flyweight title
13	Win	11–1–1	Erik Ramirez	UD	12	11 Dec 2009	Estadio Arturo C. Nahl, La Paz, Mexico	Retained WBC International light flyweight title
12	Win	10–1–1	Luis Alberto Zarraga	TKO	6 (12), 2:55	29 Aug 2009	Modelo Centerl, La Paz, Mexico	Retained WBC International light flyweight title
11	Win	9–1–1	José Luis Varela	UD	12	30 May 2009	Modelo Centerl, La Paz, Mexico	Won vacant WBC International light flyweight title
10	Win	8–1–1	Oscar Martinez	KO	1 (10)	11 Apr 2009	Estadio Arturo C. Nahl, La Paz, Mexico	
9	Win	7–1–1	Carlos Rodriguez	TKO	2	13 Dec 2008	Gimnasio Medardo Meza Dominguez, Loreto, Mexico	
8	Win	6–1–1	Osvaldo Ibarra	KO	5 (8), 2:38	31 Oct 2008	Cancha Manuel Gómez Jiménez, La Paz, Mexico	
7	Win	5–1–1	Marcelo Gerardo Lopez	UD	8	13 Jul 2008	Estadio Arturo C. Nahl, La Paz, Mexico	
6	Win	4–1–1	Francisco Reyes	SD	8	14 Jun 2008	Estadio Arturo C. Nahl, La Paz, Mexico	
5	Win	3–1–1	Felipe Montiel	KO	4 (6)	29 Feb 2008	Estadio Arturo C. Nahl, La Paz, Mexico	
4	Loss	2–1–1	Francisco Reyes	SD	10	19 Oct 2007	Deportivo Corona, La Paz, Mexico	
3	Win	2–0–1	Jose Juan Agonizante	KO	1 (6)	4 Aug 2007	Estadio Revolucion, Loreto, Mexico	
2	Win	1–0–1	Jose Reyes	KO	3 (6)	15 Jun 2007	Estadio Arturo C. Nahl, La Paz, Mexico	
1	Draw	0–0–1	Jorge Cardenas	PTS	4	16 Mar 2007	Estadio Arturo C. Nahl, La Paz, Mexico	

== See also ==
- List of light flyweight boxing champions
- List of WBO world champions
- List of Mexican boxing world champions

Sporting positions
Regional boxing titles
Vacant Title last held by Adrián Hernández	WBC International light flyweight champion May 30, 2009 – May 2010; Vacated	Vacant Title next held by Jonathan Taconing
World boxing titles
Preceded by Johnriel Casimero	WBO light flyweight champion Interim title July 24, 2010 – February 5, 2011	Succeeded by Jesús Géles
Preceded by Jesús Géles	WBO light flyweight champion April 30, 2011 – October 8, 2011	Succeeded by Donnie Nietes
