= Byron Rojas =

Nicaraguan boxer

Personal information
- Born: Byron Hasael Rojas Hernandez; 23 June 1990 (age 36) Matagalpa, Nicaragua
- Weight: Mini flyweight

Boxing career
- Stance: Orthodox

Boxing record
- Total fights: 37
- Wins: 28
- Win by KO: 11
- Losses: 4
- Draws: 3
- No contests: 2

Byron Hasael Rojas Hernandez (born 23 June 1990) is a Nicaraguan professional boxer who held the WBA minimumweight title in 2016.

== Career ==
Rojas took up boxing after being bullied in his teenage years. He was first trained by Roger Rivas. He became an amateur national champion before turning professional. Rojas drew three times in his first ten fights, and he also lost two bouts around that time, both by split decision.

Rojas won his first regional title, the Nicaraguan minimumweight title, on 30 November 2013, with a unanimous decision win over Jose Aguilar. Rojas defended his title on 22 August 2015, defeating Byron Castellón in a wide unanimous decision (98-93, 97–93, 97–92). On his next fight, Rojas would go on to face WBA and IBO minimumweight champion Hekkie Budler in Kempton Park. Budler was considered a wide favourite prior to the fight, but Rojas won a close fight marred by headbutts via unanimous decision (115-113, 115–113, 115–113). Only the WBA title was at stake, but Budler was stripped of his IBO title after the loss. The WBA then ordered a match-up between Rojas interim champion Knockout CP Freshmart in April 2016. The fight took place on 29 June in Khon Kaen. The fight was widely considered boring, as Knockout clinched through most of the fight to no warning from the referee. Nevertheless, he won the fight by unanimous decision (115-113, 115–113, 115–113) to unseat Rojas.

After losing the world title, Rojas stringed eight wins together, all of them in Nicaragua, and joined trainer Wilmer Hernández. Rojas was named as the WBA's mandatory challenger, and a rematch between Knockout CP Freshmart and Rojas was signed for 28 November 2018. Knockout won the fight by unanimous decision, with scores of 115–113, 117-111 and 116–112.

== Professional boxing record ==
36 fights	27 wins	4 losses
By knockout	11	0
By decision	16	4
Draws	3	
No contests	2	

No.	Result	Record	Opponent	Type	Round, time	Date	Location	Notes
36	Win	27–4–3 (2)	Eliezer Gazo	UD	8	24 Aug 2019	Nuevo Gimnasio Nicarao, Managua, Nicaragua	
35	NC	26–4–3 (2)	Byron Castellon	NC	2 (8), 1:48	28 Jun 2019	Nuevo Gimnasio Nicarao, Managua, Nicaragua	NC after Castellon cut
34	Win	26–4–3 (1)	Byron Castellon	SD	8	23 Feb 2019	Nuevo Gimnasio Nicarao, Managua, Nicaragua	
33	Loss	25–4–3 (1)	Knockout CP Freshmart	UD	12	29 Nov 2018	Chonburi, Thailand	For WBA minimumweight title
32	Win	25–3–3 (1)	Daniel Mendoza	KO	3 (8), 0:50	28 Jun 2018	Nuevo Gimnasio Nicarao, Managua, Nicaragua	
31	Win	24–3–3 (1)	Byron Castellon	MD	6	15 Dec 2017	Puerto Salvador Allende, Managua, Nicaragua	
30	Win	23–3–3 (1)	Omar Ortiz	UD	6	24 Nov 2017	Puerto Salvador Allende, Managua, Nicaragua	
29	Win	22–3–3 (1)	Eddy Castro	TKO	3 (8), 0:10	14 Oct 2017	Puerto Salvador Allende, Managua, Nicaragua	
28	Win	21–3–3 (1)	Nelson Luna	UD	8	25 Aug 2017	Nuevo Gimnasio Nicarao, Managua, Nicaragua	
27	Win	20–3–3 (1)	Carlos Ortega	UD	8	30 Jun 2017	Nuevo Gimnasio Nicarao, Managua, Nicaragua	
26	Win	19–3–3 (1)	Juan Lopez Martinez	TKO	6 (8)	26 May 2017	Gimnasio Rosendo Álvarez, Managua, Nicaragua	
25	Win	18–3–3 (1)	Omar Ortiz	UD	8	27 Aug 2016	Gimnasio Municipal Guy Rouck Chavez, Matagalpa, Nicaragua	
24	Loss	17–3–3 (1)	Knockout CP Freshmart	UD	12	29 Jun 2016	City Hall's Ground, Khon Kaen, Thailand	Lost WBA minimumweight title
23	Win	17–2–3 (1)	Hekkie Budler	UD	12	19 Mar 2016	Emperors Palace, Kempton Park, South Africa	Won WBA minimumweight title
22	Win	16–2–3 (1)	Byron Castellon	UD	10	22 Aug 2015	Gimnasio Municipal Guy Rouck Chavez, Matagalpa, Nicaragua	Retained Nicaraguan minimumweight title
21	Win	15–2–3 (1)	Julio Mendoza	TKO	5 (8), 0:10	25 Oct 2014	Gimnasio Municipal Guy Rouck Chavez, Matagalpa, Nicaragua	
20	Win	14–2–3 (1)	Jose Aguilar	UD	8	23 Aug 2014	Gimnasio Municipal Guy Rouck Chavez, Matagalpa, Nicaragua	
19	Win	13–2–3 (1)	Ricardo Perez	UD	8	17 May 2014	Gimnasio Municipal Guy Rouck Chavez, Matagalpa, Nicaragua	
18	Win	12–2–3 (1)	Israel Morales	TKO	2 (8), 2:30	22 Mar 2014	Gimnasio Municipal Guy Rouck Chavez, Matagalpa, Nicaragua	
17	Win	11–2–3 (1)	Eduardo Martinez	UD	10	8 Feb 2014	Gimnasio Municipal Guy Rouck Chavez, Matagalpa, Nicaragua	
16	Win	10–2–3 (1)	Jose Aguilar	UD	10	30 Nov 2013	Gimnasio Municipal Guy Rouck Chavez, Matagalpa, Nicaragua	Won Nicaraguan minimumweight title
15	Win	9–2–3 (1)	Luis Rios	UD	8	19 Oct 2013	Gimnasio Alexis Argüello, Managua, Nicaragua	
14	NC	8–2–3 (1)	Alcides Martinez	NC	3 (6), 0:47	30 Aug 2013	Batallon de Infanteria Mecanizada, Managua, Nicaragua	NC after Martinez could not continue from a head injury
13	Win	8–2–3	Omar Ortiz	TKO	3 (6), 2:44	27 Jul 2013	Puerto Salvador Allende, Managua, Nicaragua	
12	Win	7–2–3	Alexander Martinez	TKO	4 (4), 2:19	23 Mar 2013	Gimnasio Municipal Guy Rouck Chavez, Matagalpa, Nicaragua	
11	Loss	6–2–3	Roger Collado	SD	6	1 Dec 2012	Gimnasio de Nindiri, Masaya, Nicaragua	
10	Loss	6–1–3	Luis Rios	SD	6	4 Aug 2012	Gimnasio Alexis Argüello, Managua, Nicaragua	
9	Win	6–0–3	Roger Collado	TKO	4 (6), 0:10	18 Feb 2012	Puerto Salvador Allende, Managua, Nicaragua	
8	Win	5–0–3	Francisco Elizabeth	TKO	4 (4), 2:14	26 Mar 2011	Gimnasio Alexis Argüello, Managua, Nicaragua	
7	Win	4–0–3	Johnson Tellez	UD	4	11 Mar 2011	Gimnasio L.A. Promotions, Estelí, Nicaragua	
6	Draw	3–0–3	Alcides Martinez	SD	4	18 Dec 2010	Puerto Salvador Allende, Managua, Nicaragua	
5	Draw	3–0–2	Alcides Martinez	SD	4	13 Nov 2010	Puerto Salvador Allende, Managua, Nicaragua	
4	Win	3–0–1	Carlos Manzanares	SD	4	30 Oct 2010	Gimnasio Alexis Argüello, Managua, Nicaragua	
3	Win	2–0–1	Francisco Elizabeth	TKO	2 (4), 1:40	25 Sep 2010	Gimnasio Municipal de Chichigalpa, Chinandega, Nicaragua	
2	Win	1–0–1	Jose Carvajal	KO	2 (4), 2:13	4 Sep 2010	Gimnasio Alexis Argüello, Managua, Nicaragua	
1	Draw	0–0–1	Carlos Manzanares	MD	4	14 Aug 2010	Gimnasio Alexis Argüello, Managua, Nicaragua	

Sporting positions
Regional boxing titles
Preceded by Jose Aguilar	Nicaraguan minimumweight champion 30 November 2013 – January 2016; Vacated	Vacant Title next held by Julio Mendoza
World boxing titles
Preceded by Hekkie Budler	WBA minimumweight champion 19 March 2016 – 29 June 2016	Succeeded by Knockout CP Freshmart
