= Selva Negra Cloud Forest Reserve =

Nature preserve in Matagalpa Department, Nicaragua

Selva Negra Cloud Forest Reserve is a nature reserve in Nicaragua. It is one of the 78 reserves which are officially under protection in the country. It is adjacent to Selva Negra Mountain Resort.

The reserve is close to the capital city of Matagalpa Department (also called Matagalpa); it includes rainforests, an artificial lagoon, 200 species of birds and some monkeys. The reserve also has 14 hiking trails.
