= Matagalpa =

Matagalpa San Pedro de Matagalpa
- Municipality
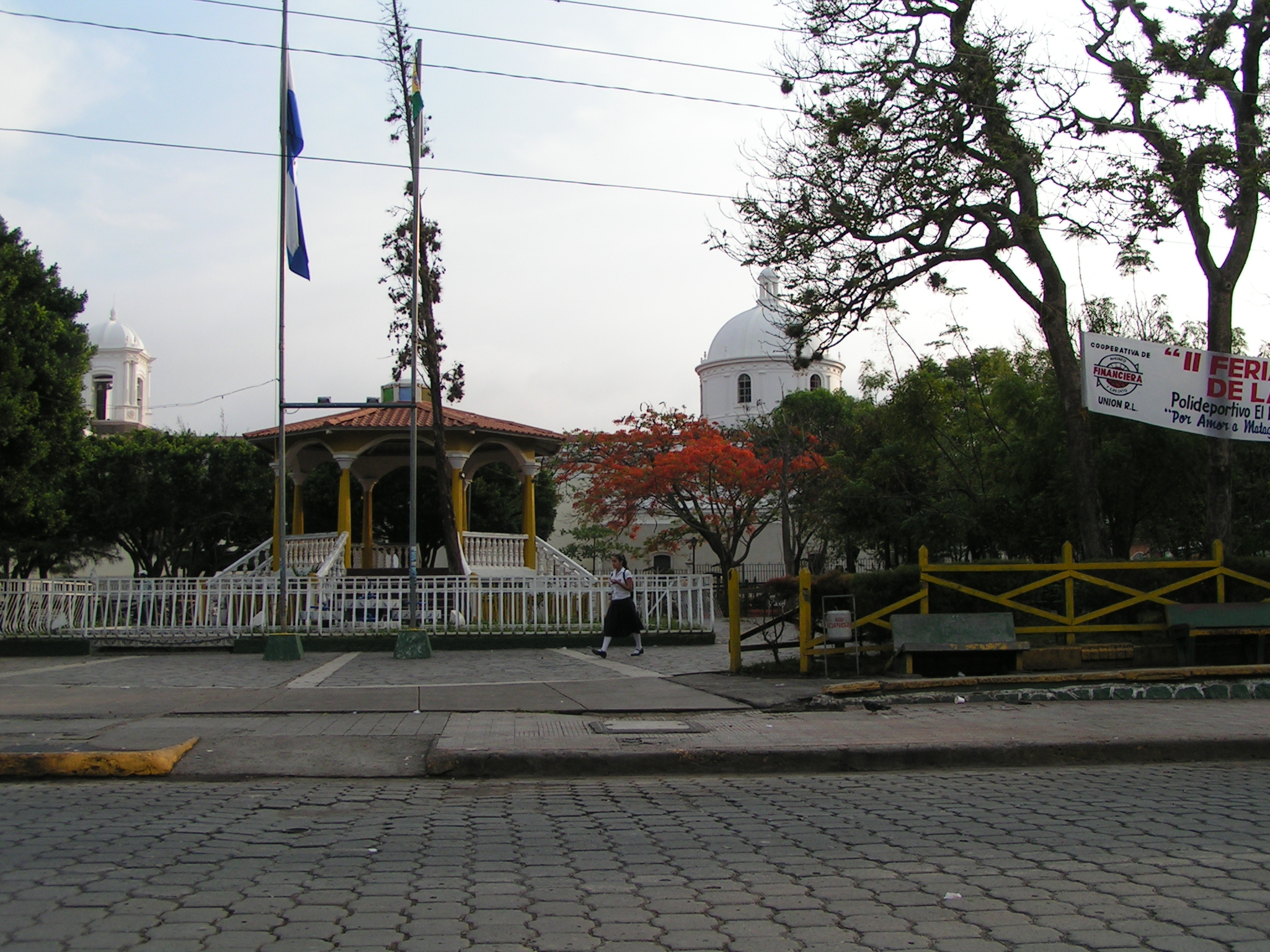
- Matagalpa's Cathedral

- Flag Seal

- Location in Nicaragua
- Coordinates: 12°55′N 85°55′W
- Country: Nicaragua
- Department: Matagalpa Department

Government
  - Mayor: Sadrach Zeledón

Area
  - Municipality: 619 km^{2} (239 sq mi)

Population (2022 estimate)
  - Municipality: 169,540
  - Density: 274/km^{2} (709/sq mi)
  - Urban: 112,697 (7th Nicaragua)
- Climate: Aw

Matagalpa (Spanish pronunciation: [mataˈɣalpa]) is a city in Nicaragua which is the capital of the department of Matagalpa. The city has a population of 112,697 (2022 estimate), while the population of the department is 606,643. Matagalpa is Nicaragua's seventh largest city, the largest in the country's interior, and one of the most commercially active outside of Managua. Matagalpa is known as the "Pearl of the North" and "Land of Eternal Spring."

== Etymology ==
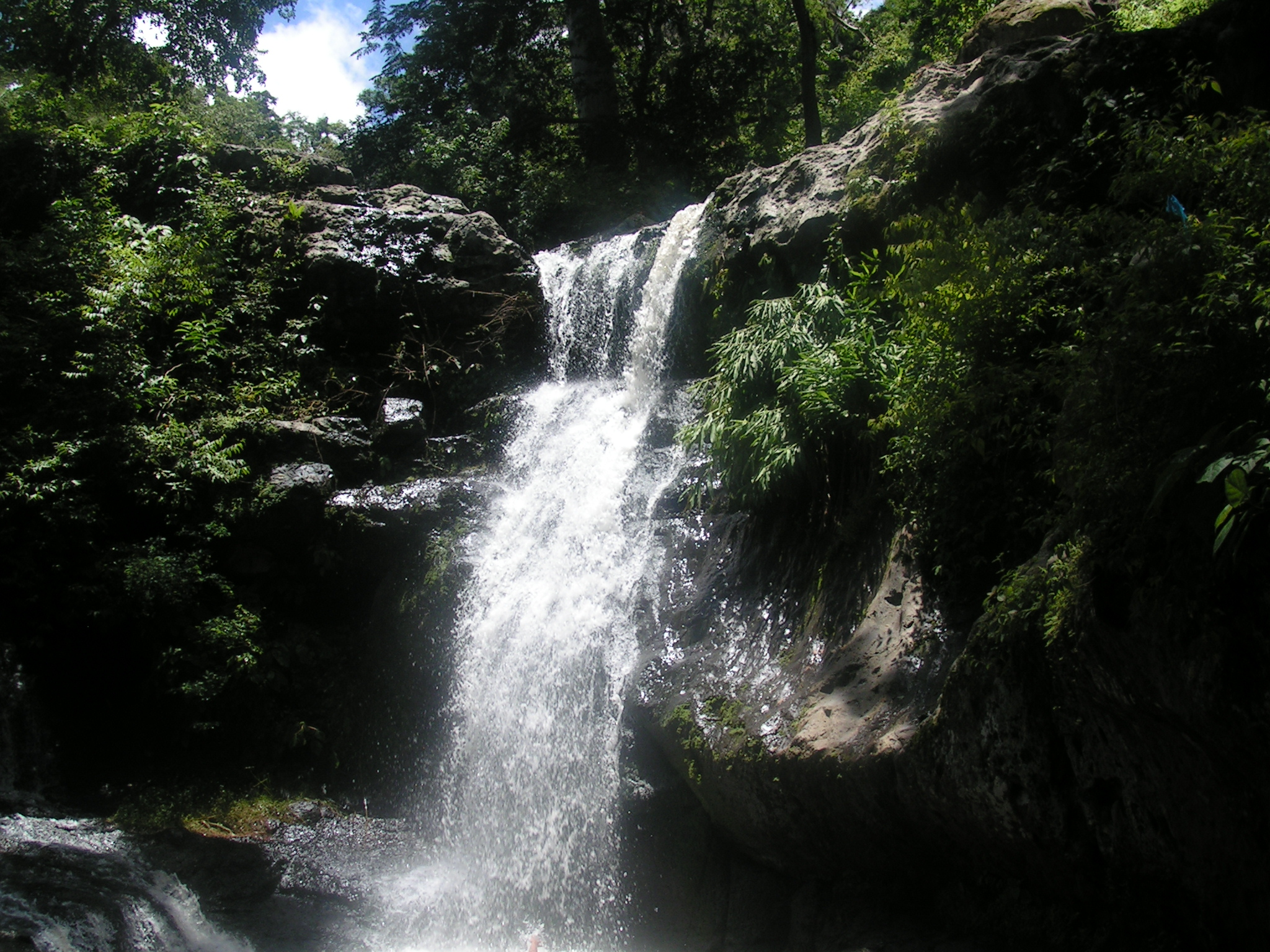
A waterfall in the Apante area of Matagalpa.

According to Jeronimo Perez, a historian who visited this area in 1855–1856 the name Matagalpa means Cabeza Principal (Main Head) or Pueblo Grande (Big Town) from the Matagalpa indigenous language words: Maika=Head, Calpul* Town- But according to the Matagalpan linguist father Guillermo Kiene, a Catholic priest and missionary who lived from 1898 to 1959, the word Matagalpa comes from the Sumo language, and means "let's go where the rocks are."

There have been other descriptions of the word Matagalpa: -Here next to the water, and -Among Mountains ( "Aquí junto al agua" y "Entre Montañas"). These descriptions are believed to be related to the geographic location of the city, which is next to the Grand River of Matagalpa, and also surrounded by mountains.

== History ==
=== Precolonial history ===
Matagalpa was originally an indigenous village. The Cacaopera people, or Matagalpa had their own language, which has been extinct since 1875. A document from the year 1855 with 97 words and phrases from the Matagalpa language can be found in the Daniel G. Brinton section of the American Philosophical Library in Philadelphia.

The Matagalpa made ceramics of a style known as "Ceramica Negra" and "Naranja Segovia", they also built stone statues representing their chieftain and warriors. They were feared by the Spanish because they were very brave and effective with their bows and other arms. It took 300 years for the Spanish to submit them, even at the time of Nicaragua Independence in 1821, there were many Cacaopera free in the central mountains of Nicaragua. In 1856 they were decisive to defeat William Walker's filibusters in the Battle of San Jacinto on 14 September 1856, where a column of 60 Cacaopera people with bow and arrows fought at the side of Nicaraguan Patriots winning that battle, which marked the end of Walker's adventure in Nicaragua. That quest has been recognized by historians and archaeologists, and there is a popular movement to declare the Cacaopera as National Heroes by the Congress of the Republic next month of September 2011.

=== Post-colonial history ===
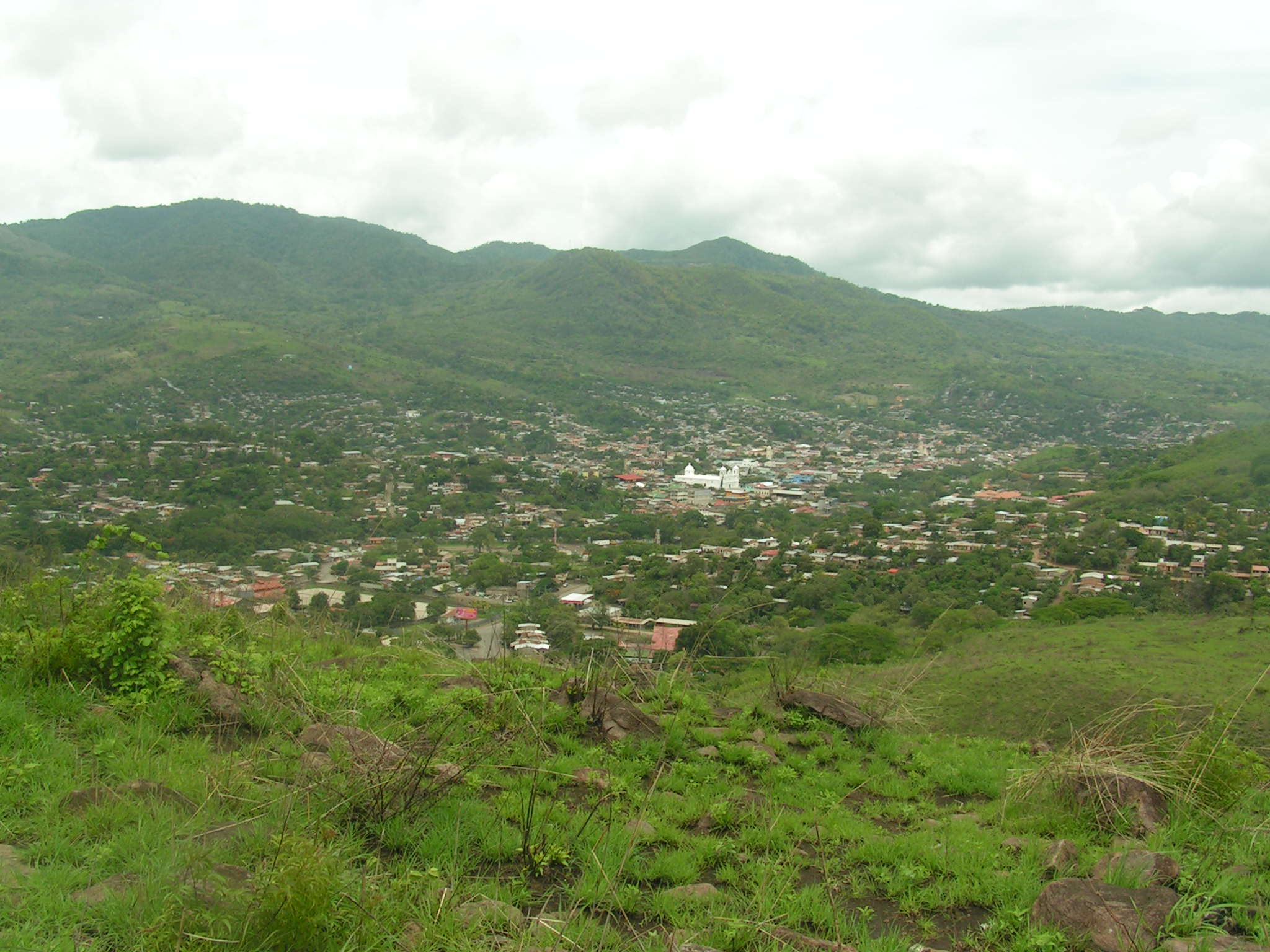
View of downtown from one of the surrounding hills

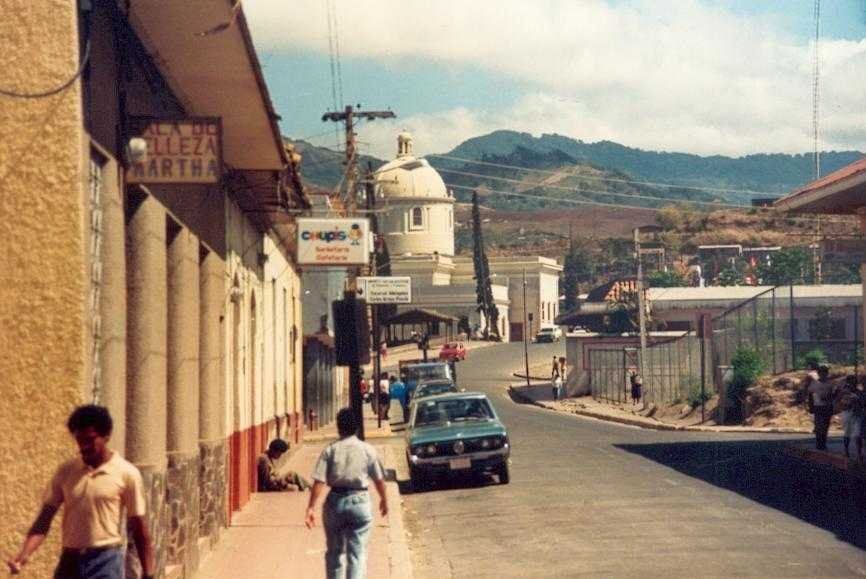
Street in Matagalpa, April 1988.

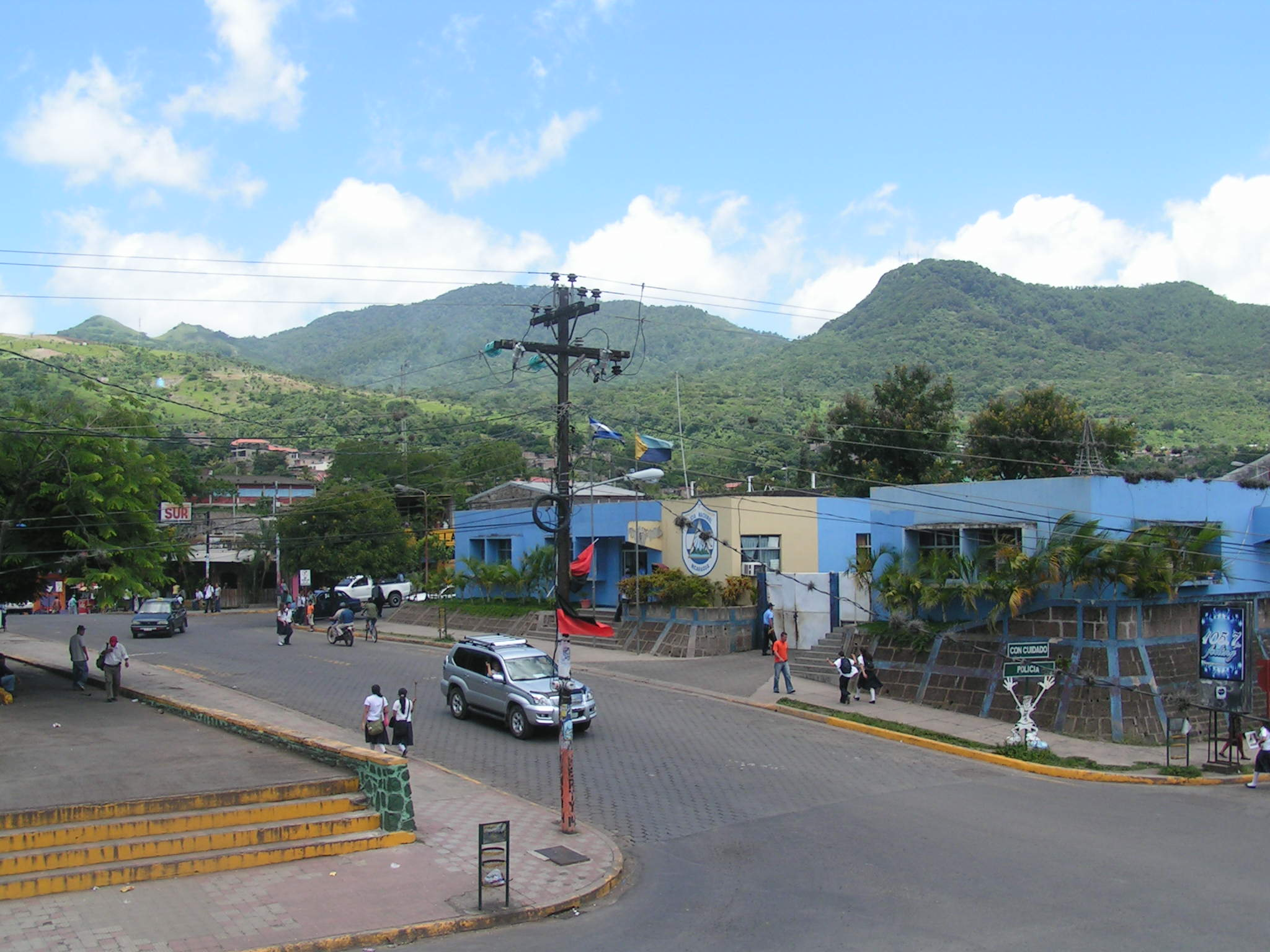
The National Police of Nicaragua operates the Matagalpa District Station.

Matagalpa was an existing indigenous town when the first Spaniards came to this region by 1528 during an attempt to find a water passage to the "Northern Sea", the Caribbean. (Nicaragua's Spanish colonization originated from the direction of the Pacific Ocean, which was called the Southern Sea by the Spaniards.

Matagalpa is located in the continental divide between the Pacific Ocean and the Caribbean Sea. Many stories are preserved from colonial times about the British-controlled Mosquito Coast, and the Spanish-colonized Pacific area.

Gold was discovered around Matagalpa by 1840. Along with many Spaniards and Mestizos, it attracted German, American and British immigrants. Two of the better known immigrants of this period were Ludwig Elster (from Hannover) and his wife Katharina Braun (from Schwarzwald, Germany Black Forest) who planted the first coffee trees in the area, the beans from which quickly went to market in Germany. Coffee agriculture attracted more than 120 European immigrants, many of whom married Matagalpan women, and many of their descendants still live in the area.

In 1923 some Danish immigrants also came to Matagalpa, and settled in the highlands as well. Most of the Danish families went back to Denmark. Three families stayed: the Gröns, the Möllers, and the Petersens.

Matagalpa was also the city of refuge for many Nicaraguans escaping the invasion of Tennessean filibuster William Walker who took over much of the country and government in 1856. In Matagalpa the patriots organized the Ejército del Septentrión ("Army of the North"), which fought in and won the Battle of San Jacinto, assisted by 60 Matagalpa, on 14 September 1856, helping to end Walker's rule.

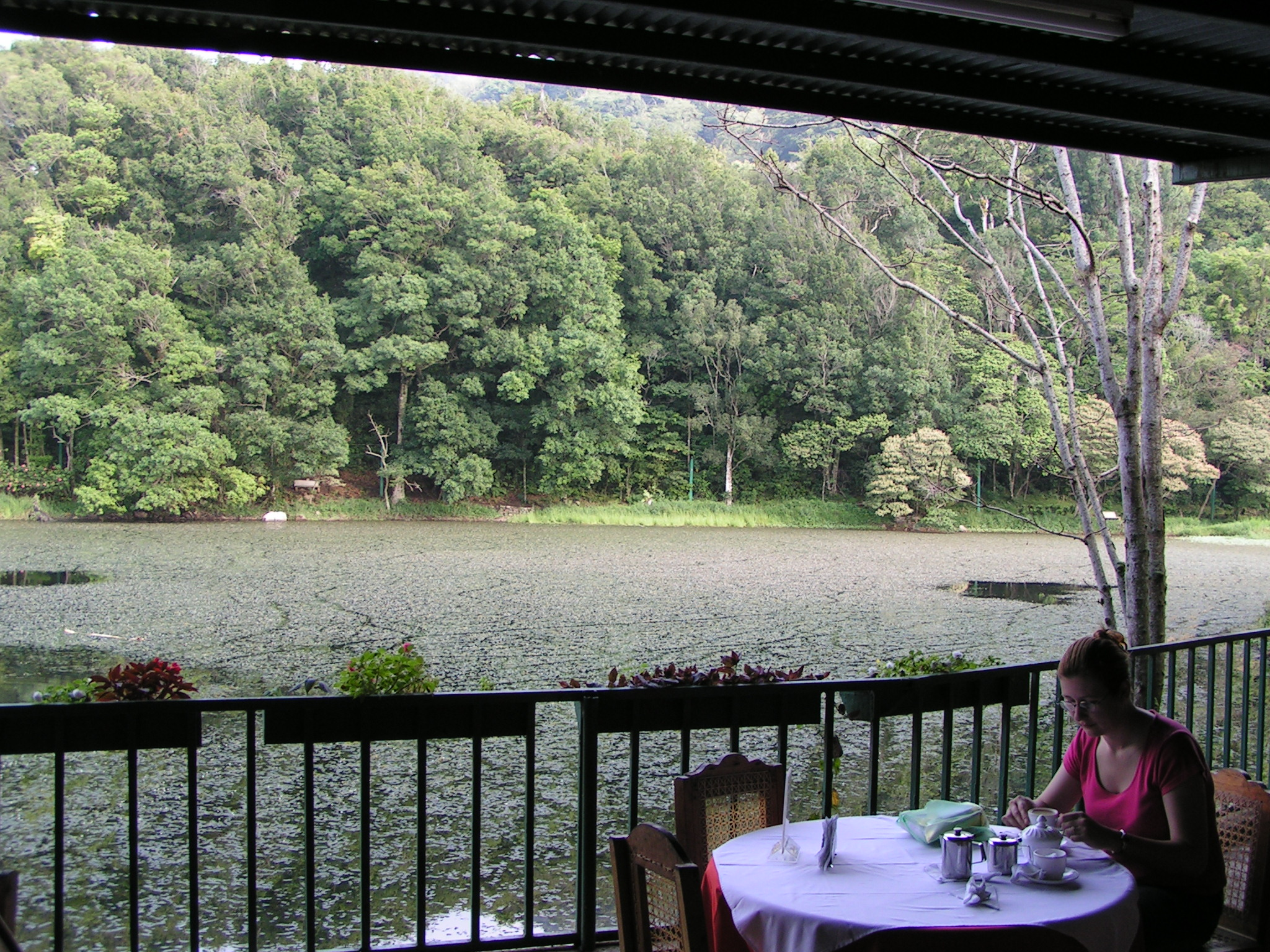
Visitor at Selva Negra Mountain Resort.

Matagalpa Department was also the birthplace of Rubén Darío, 1867-1916; Nazario Vega, Governor and builder of the Cathedral; Bartolomé Martínez, President of Nicaragua, 1923–24; Matias Baldizon Morales, 1820-1886, and Carlos Fonseca Amador, founder of the Sandinista Front in 1961.

Currently the department of Matagalpa is the second most populous in Nicaragua after the national capital (Managua), and the most diversified in production. Over the past few years Matagalpa has experienced a large influx of migrants (mainly peasants) from other departments, causing stress on infrastructure and the environment.

Matagalpa has a panoramic highway that starts in the city of Matagalpa and extends 30 kilometres (19 miles) to the city of Jinotega. Scenic views extend up to 140 kilometres (87 miles) away, to the volcanic range near the Pacific coast.

Many historians, archeologists, botanists and ethnologists have arrived in recent years to do research in this region. American and European descendants of the first settlers are also returning to visit the historical homes of their ancestors.

== Economy ==
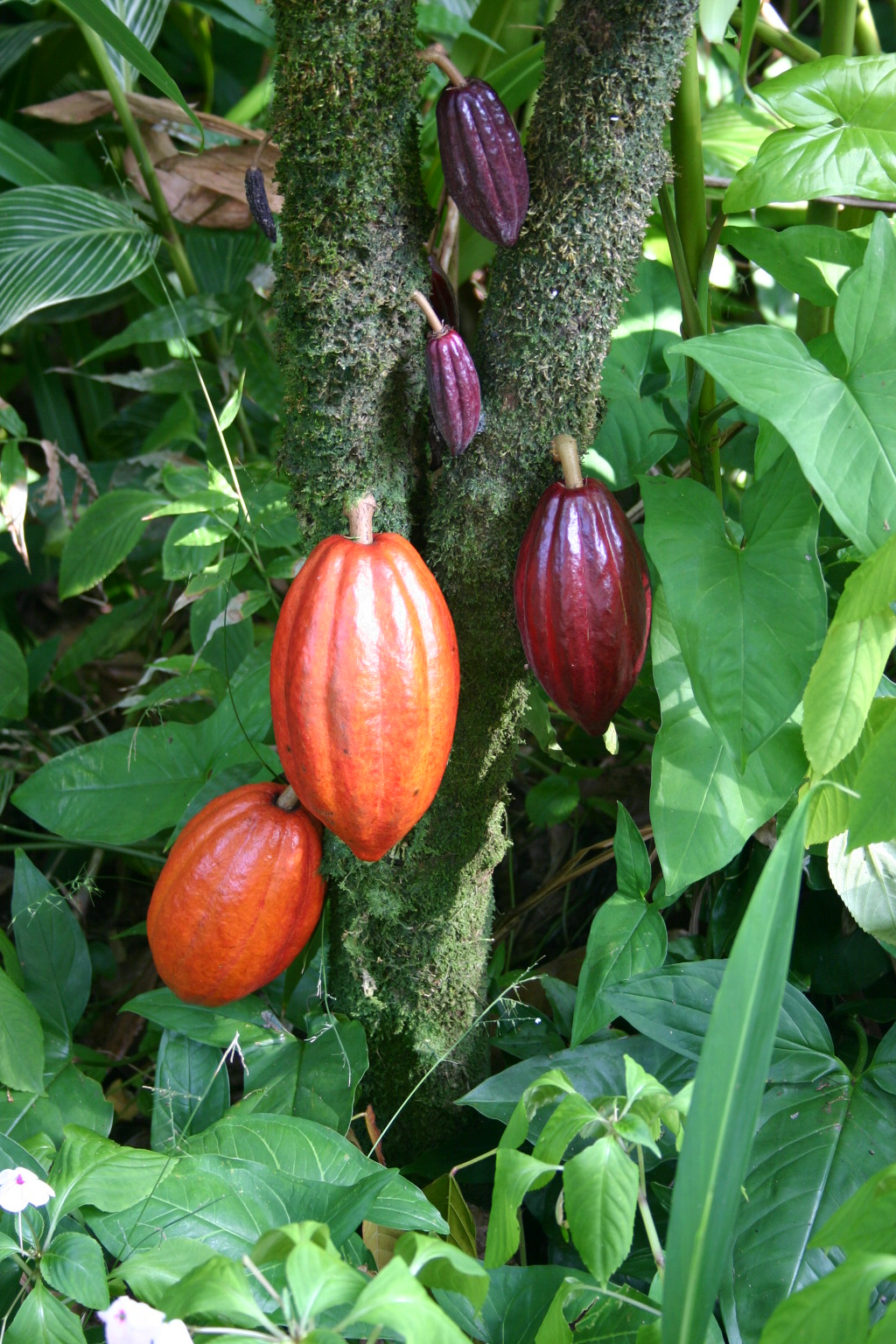
Cocoa is one of the main productions of Matagalpa.

Matagalpa produces and exports beef, cheese, coffee, cacao, onions, tomatoes and mixed fruits and vegetables. For local consumption it produces flowers, wood, corn, beans, fruits (oranges, grapefruits, bananas, plantains) and many kinds of vegetables such as broccoli, and cauliflower.

Matagalpa is known for its coffee, its cattle, milk products, vegetables, flowers and mountains popular with ecotourists. It is the location of such storied mountain tourist resorts as Aranjuez, Santa Maria de Ostuma, and Selva Negra Mountain Resort.

A large part of the economy in Matagalpa depends on eco-tourism. Nature hikes, walks, and excursions are very common throughout Matagalpa, and the northern region on Nicaragua. One of the most recognized eco-tourism sites is Selva Negra Wildlife Refuge, with over 120 hectares (300 acres) of land dedicated to the conservation of the area's diverse flora and fauna.

== Climate ==
Matagalpa has a tropical savanna climate (Köppen: Aw). Along with nearby Jinotega, Matagalpa enjoys an "eternal spring" or all year, spring-like weather. Matagalpa lies more than 700 m (2,297 ft) above sea level with the average temperature ranging from 26 to 29 °C (79 to 84 °F), and relative humidity between 75% and 85%. Average rainfall is 1,150 mm (45 in).

Climate data for Matagalpa
Month	Jan	Feb	Mar	Apr	May	Jun	Jul	Aug	Sep	Oct	Nov	Dec	Year
Mean daily maximum °C (°F)	25.7 (78.3)	26.7 (80.1)	28.4 (83.1)	29.9 (85.8)	29.0 (84.2)	27.2 (81.0)	26.7 (80.1)	27.5 (81.5)	27.7 (81.9)	26.9 (80.4)	26.1 (79.0)	25.8 (78.4)	27.3 (81.1)
Daily mean °C (°F)	21.0 (69.8)	21.7 (71.1)	22.8 (73.0)	24.3 (75.7)	24.1 (75.4)	23.0 (73.4)	22.7 (72.9)	22.9 (73.2)	22.9 (73.2)	22.5 (72.5)	21.8 (71.2)	21.3 (70.3)	22.6 (72.6)
Mean daily minimum °C (°F)	17.2 (63.0)	17.3 (63.1)	17.9 (64.2)	19.3 (66.7)	20.2 (68.4)	19.9 (67.8)	19.7 (67.5)	19.6 (67.3)	19.5 (67.1)	19.3 (66.7)	18.4 (65.1)	17.8 (64.0)	18.8 (65.9)
Average precipitation mm (inches)	14.7 (0.58)	11.9 (0.47)	13.9 (0.55)	36.4 (1.43)	202.5 (7.97)	182.4 (7.18)	90.5 (3.56)	128.5 (5.06)	177.3 (6.98)	197.9 (7.79)	68.6 (2.70)	22.1 (0.87)	1,146.7 (45.14)
Mean monthly sunshine hours	260.4	253.4	290.7	282.1	261.4	240.9	265.8	265.4	243.8	228.8	234.8	254.7	3,082.2
Source: Weather.Directory

== Gallery ==
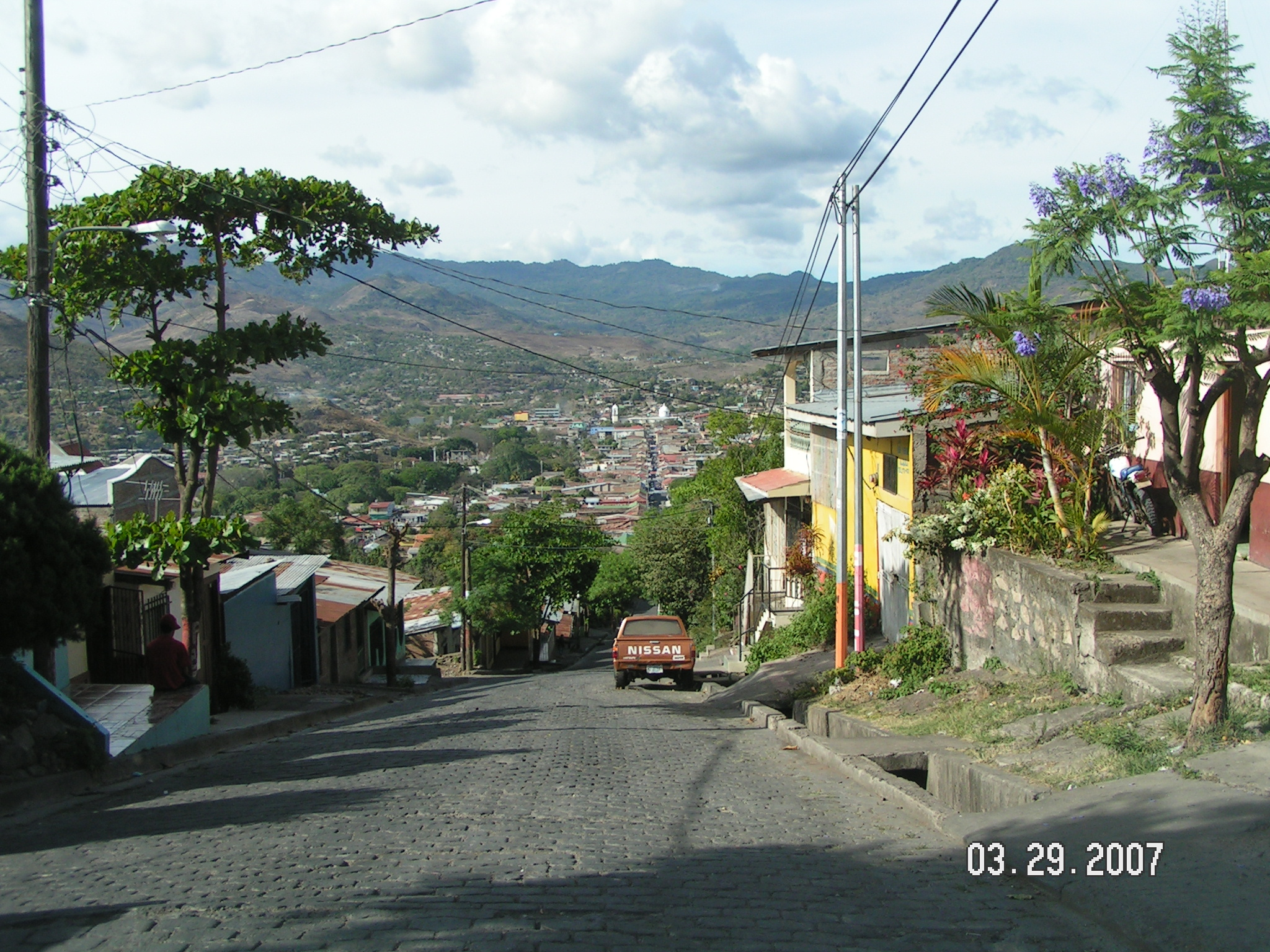
Main Street to Parque Morazan and Cathedral

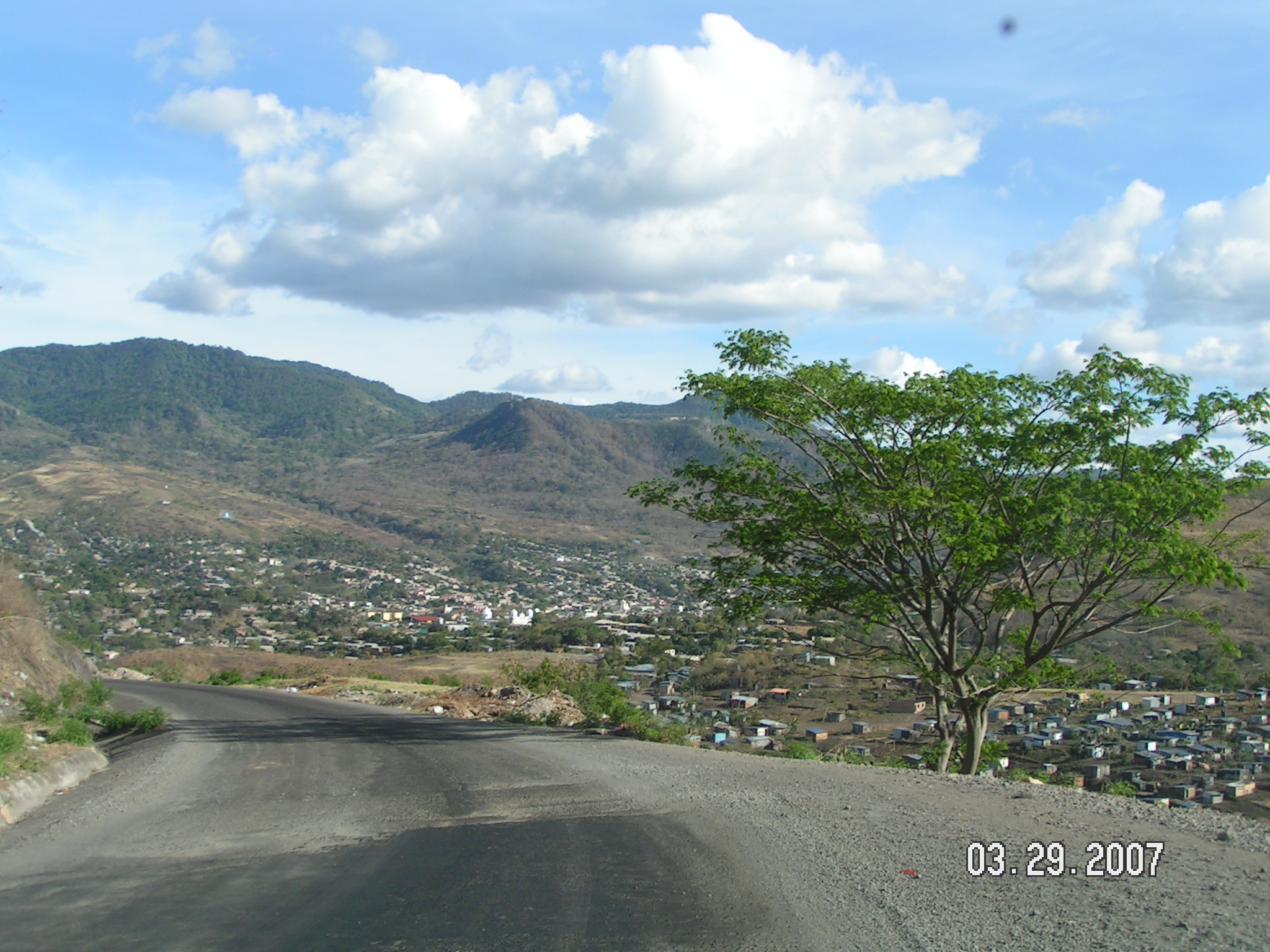
Overlook of downtown from Matagalpa-Jinotega highway during the dry season

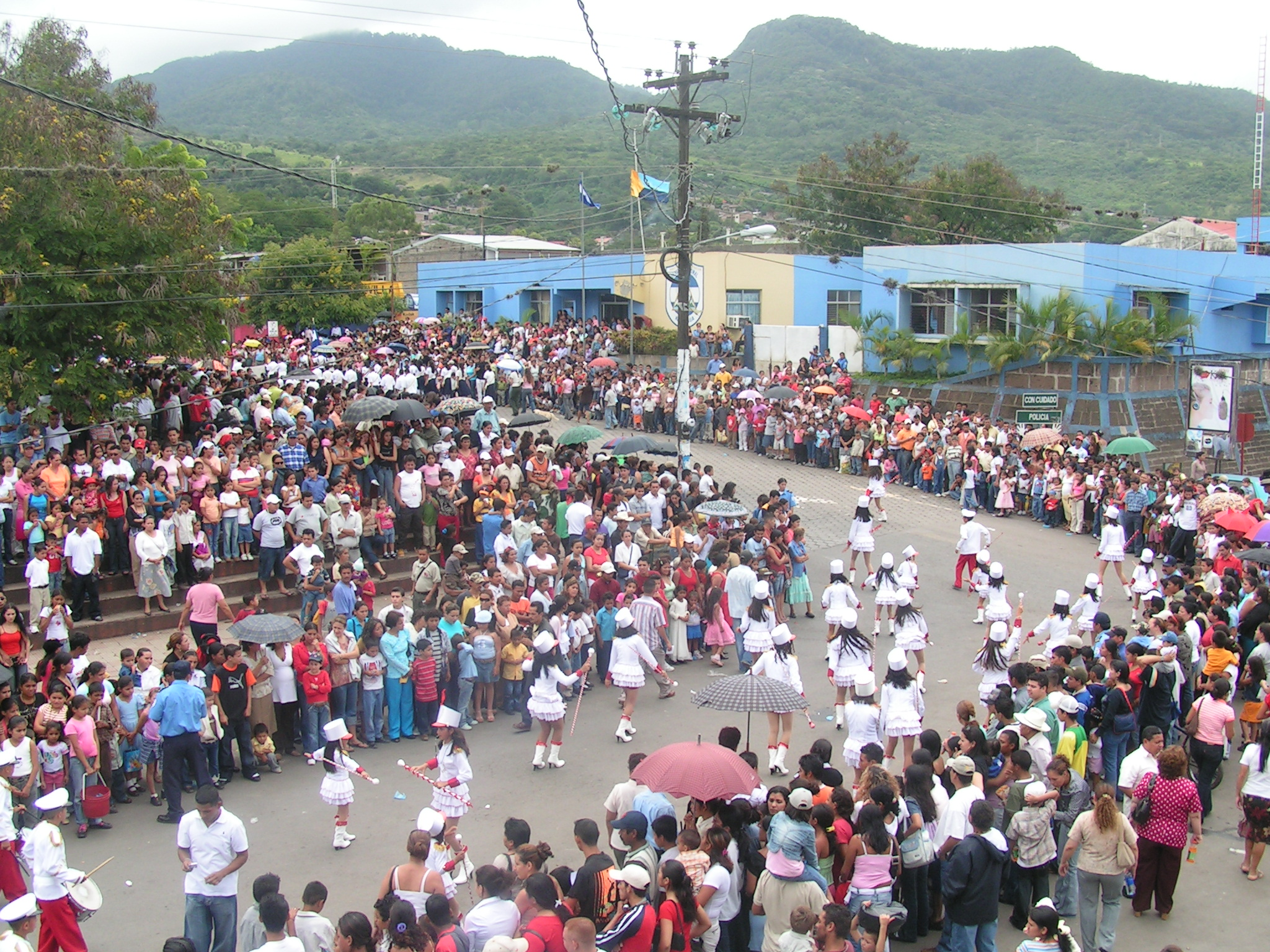
2007 Independence Day parade

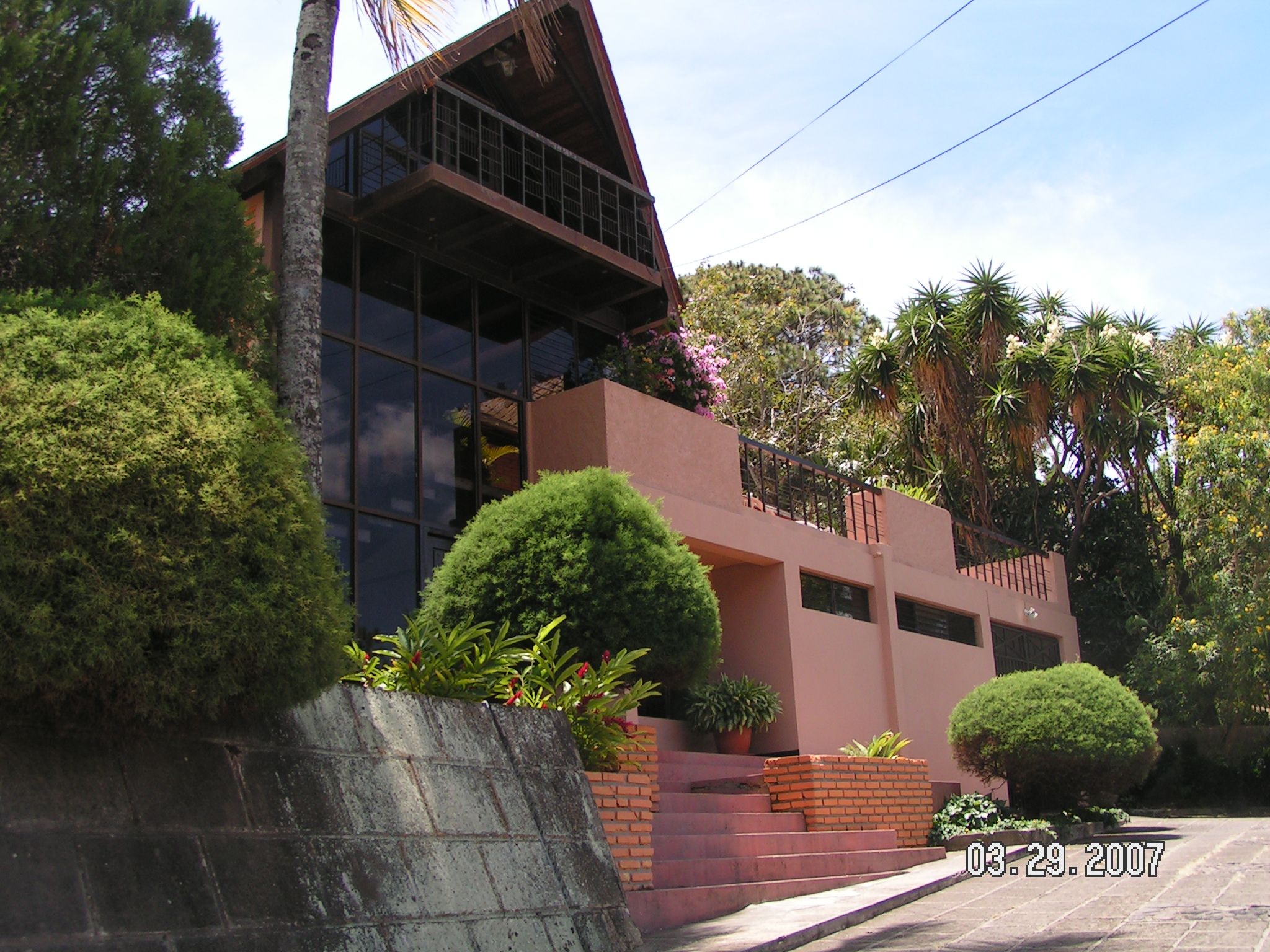
Home in Matagalpa

== Notable people ==
- Carlos Fonseca, FSLN founder
- Dorothy Granada, American nurse, humanitarian, and peace and social justice activist who founded a women's health clinic in Mulukukú during the 1990s, won the International Pfeffer Peace Award in 1997, and was still a resident of Matagalpa as of 2022
- Marina Jacoby, Miss Nicaragua 2016
- Bartolome Martinez, President of Nicaragua 1923-1924
- Byron Rojas, boxer

== International relations ==
=== Twin towns – Sister cities ===
Matagalpa is twinned with:

- Wuppertal, Germany
- Tilburg, Netherlands
- Sabadell, Spain
- Gainesville, United States
- San Pedro Sula, Honduras
- Lewisham, United Kingdom
- Valparaíso, Chile
- San Francisco, United States
- Retalhuleu, Guatemala
- Heredia, Costa Rica
- Oulu, Finland
- Colón, Panama
- Antigua Guatemala, Guatemala
- Cojutepeque, El Salvador
- Saint Petersburg, Russia
- Shanghai, China
- Jalisco, Mexico
