= Santa María de Ostuma =

Santa María de Ostuma was a Mountain Hotel built by Leo Salazar in 1936. It was located in the province of Matagalpa, Nicaragua and attended personally by its owners. The resort's fame spread, and many local and international tourists visited it for vacationing and ecotourism. It was confiscated by the Sandinista government and closed in 1983.

== History ==
Leopoldo Salazar Amador acquired the Santa María de Ostuma property in the 1920s, growing coffee there even as Augusto César Sandino's guerrilla bands raided through the area. In 1933, the Potter family opened the Mountain Hotel of Aranjuez nearby. (It was converted into a sanitarium in 1950.) Leo Salazar built his own Mountain Hotel (Hotel de Montaña) in 1936. "Jolly, round-faced" Leo and his wife, Esmeralda "Meyaya" Argüello, personally attended to guests.

The "cloud-capped" resort was regarded as "one of the most picturesque areas of the country." Different attractions drew a diversity of guests. "This may be the only place on our continent where, in one day, you can shoot a wild boar, land a 20-pound lake trout, unearth a priceless pre-Christian ceramic and watch the brilliantly plumed quetzals mate," one observer wrote.

Some visitors were naturalists, interested in the flora and fauna of the region. Ornithologists came to study birds in the region's habitat, others came to observe rodents or catalog orchids.

Hunting and fishing was a draw for some guests. The resort also became known as a honeymoon destination for newlyweds.

Bianca Jagger would reminisce that vacations with her mother in the Santa María de Ostuma region were among her "happiest memories."

In 1975–76, the Selva Negra Mountain Resort opened a few miles away to the east, also servicing tourists attracted to the beauty of the nearby mountains.

In 1978, while the Sandinista rebellion waxed stronger, the Salazars' son Jorge Salazar Argüello moved back to Santa María de Ostuma and set about to revitalize the farm. An altercation with guerrillas camped on the property stoked Leo's fears that the rebels would take revenge for his National Guard service in the 1930s during the time when the US Marines created and commanded the Guard, and he went into exile in February 1979. However, Jorge and his family sympathized with the rebel cause, and fed the guerrillas.

During the Somoza regime's collapse, Jorge began organizing fellow coffee farmers in the region into a cooperative, which provided him with an initial political base as he increasingly protested against the policies of the new Sandinista government. He was killed in November 1980.

As with many Sandinista-confiscated properties, Santa María de Ostuma was the scene of turmoil in the years after Violeta Chamorro defeated them in 1990 elections. According to Jorge Salazar's daughter Lucía, although the land was officially returned to the family, Sandinista general Joaquín Cuadra, who had misappropriated various farms in the area that had been arbitrarily confiscated by the Sandinistas, turned it over only reluctantly, there were incursions by machete-armed men, and vandalism had ruined the property. The Sandinista Agricultural Workers' Association, on the other hand, complained to the International Labour Organization that four union members had been arrested by the police at the ranch, arrests the government denied had taken place. Land disputes created by the confiscation continue into 2007. The hotel has not been rebuilt.

In post-Sandinista governments, Jorge Salazar's son Jorge Salazar Cardenal would be appointed Minister of the Environment and Natural Resources, and his daughter Lucía Salazar de Robelo would serve as Minister of Tourism.

The Hotel Santa María de Ostuma serves as the setting for Jesús Miguel "Chuno" Blandón's novel, La Noche de los Anillos.
