= Jesús Géles =

Colombian boxer (born 1988)

Personal information
- Nickname: El Cuchilla (The Blade)
- Nationality: Colombian
- Born: Jesús Geles Vásquez; 22 February 1988 (age 38) Cartagena, Colombia
- Weight: Light flyweight; Flyweight

Boxing career
- Stance: Orthodox

Boxing record
- Total fights: 20
- Wins: 15
- Win by KO: 6
- Losses: 4
- Draws: 1

Jesús Géles (born 22 February 1988) is a Colombian former professional boxer who competed from 2008 to 2014 and held the WBO junior flyweight title in 2011.

== Professional career ==
Géles defeated Omar Soto to win the interim WBO junior flyweight title by majority decision on 30 October 2010 after original opponent Ramón García Hirales pulled out. He was then promoted to full WBO champion on 11 March 2011, after Giovani Segura vacated the title. Géles lost the title in his first defense, a rematch against García Hirales, on 30 April 2011, by fourth-round knockout.

== Professional boxing record ==
20 fights	15 wins	4 losses
By knockout	6	3
By decision	9	1
Draws	1	

No.	Result	Record	Opponent	Type	Round, time	Date	Location	Notes
20	Loss	15–4–1	Laureano Sciuto	KO	2 (10), 0:30	28 August 2022	Club Social y Deportivo El Porvenir, Quilmes, Argentina	
19	Win	15–3–1	Martin Bonilla	UD	6	25 February 2022	Hotel El Morichal, Melgar, Colombia	
18	Win	14–3–1	Jonathan Moran	KO	1 (6), 2:25	16 May 2014	Coliseo Cubierto, Puerto Colombia, Colombia	
17	Loss	13–3–1	Milan Melindo	TKO	1 (12), 2:21	2 June 2012	Newport Performing Arts Theatre, Pasay, Philippines	For inaugural WBO International flyweight title
16	Win	13–2–1	Wilfrido Lans	UD	6	30 March 2012	Coliseo Bernardo Caraballo, Cartagena, Colombia	
15	Loss	12–2–1	Ramón García Hirales	KO	4 (12), 1:15	30 April 2011	Foro Polanco, Mexico City, Mexico	Lost WBO light flyweight title
14	Win	12–1–1	Ramón García Hirales	SD	12	5 February 2011	Coliseo Bernardo Caraballo, Cartagena, Colombia	Retained WBO interim light flyweight title
13	Win	11–1–1	Omar Soto	MD	12	30 October 2010	Centro de Convenciones, Cartagena, Colombia	Won WBO interim light flyweight title
12	Win	10–1–1	Luis Doria	UD	10	1 October 2010	Cancha El Monumental, Cartagena, Colombia	Retained Colombian flyweight title
11	Win	9–1–1	Alfonso De la Hoz	UD	10	30 July 2010	Cancha El Monumental, Cartagena, Colombia	Won vacant Colombian flyweight title
10	Win	8–1–1	Victor Peralta	TKO	5 (6), 1:55	25 June 2010	Coliseo Cubierto, Puerto Colombia, Colombia	
9	Draw	7–1–1	Luis Doria	MD	10	12 February 2010	Campito de Bocagrande, Cartagena, Colombia	For vacant Colombian flyweight title
8	Win	7–1	Ricardo Herrera	KO	1 (8), 1:06	17 December 2009	Coliseo Bernardo Caraballo, Cartagena, Colombia	
7	Win	6–1	Alfonso Monterrosa	UD	6	2 July 2009	Discoteca El Escandalo, Cartagena, Colombia	
6	Loss	5–1	Alfonso Monterrosa	MD	6	3 April 2009	Centro Recreacional Las Vegas, Barranquilla, Colombia	
5	Win	5–0	Weiner Sandoval	KO	1 (4), 1:38	14 February 2009	Puerto Colombia, Colombia	
4	Win	4–0	Luis Ballesteros	KO	2 (6), 0:55	30 October 2008	Coliseo de Combate, Cartagena, Colombia	
3	Win	3–0	Rocky Narvaez	UD	4	18 July 2008	Coliseo de Combate, Cartagena, Colombia	
2	Win	2–0	Jose Humberto Caraballo	UD	4	30 May 2008	Coliseo de Combate, Cartagena, Colombia	
1	Win	1–0	Ricardo Herrera	KO	1 (4), 1:08	15 May 2008	Coliseo de Combate, Cartagena, Colombia	

== See also ==
- List of world light-flyweight boxing champions

Sporting positions
World boxing titles
Preceded by Ramón García Hirales as co-titlist until 5 February 2011	WBO light flyweight champion Interim title 30 October 2010 - 22 April 2011; Promoted	Vacant Title next held by Moisés Fuentes
Preceded by Giovani Segura; Vacated	WBO light flyweight champion 22 April 2011 - 30 April 2011	Succeeded by Ramón García Hirales
