= Expo Forum =

Arena in Sonora, Mexico

The Expo Forum is a convention center and arena complex located in Hermosillo, Sonora, Mexico. It was built in 2004.

It was chosen to host the inaugural Sonora Rock Fest in 2025.

== Buildings ==
The complex comprises three buildings:

The Recinto Ferial y de Exposiciones is an exhibit hall with 7,120 square meters (76,640 square feet) of exhibit space, which can be divided into two smaller exhibit halls. It is used for trade shows, conventions and meetings seating up to 8,000, banquets and other special events. There is a 5,382-square-foot (500.0 m^{2}) main entrance as well as a 3,445-square-foot (320.1 m^{2}) kitchen.

The Salon Venetto contains a 13,993-square-foot (1,300.0 m^{2}) ballroom that can be used for banquets, meetings, receptions, quinceneras, and other special events. There is also a 150-square-meter (1,615 square feet) conference room. It has a 750-square-foot (70 m^{2}) kitchen.

The Foro de Conciertos y Espectaculos is a 10,807-seat indoor arena which was built to bring major concerts to Hermosillo. The 13,975-square-meter (150,428 square foot) venue can also accommodate trade shows, conventions, religious crusades, and with portable stands, sporting events including basketball, lucha libre, boxing and wrestling. Since its opening the Foro de Conciertos y Espectaculos has welcomed such performers as Banda el Recodo, Gloria Trevi, Pedro Fernández, Pepe Aguilar, Lupita D'Alessio, Intocable, Alicia Villarreal, Joan Sebastian, Paulina Rubio, Mana and many others.
