= Bert Batawang =

Filipino boxer (born 1971)

Personal information
- Nickname: The Ninja
- Nationality: Filipino
- Born: Bertoldo Batawang Jr. October 26, 1971 (age 54) Cebu City, Cebu, Philippines
- Height: 5 ft 2 in (1.57 m)
- Weight: Light Flyweight

Boxing career
- Stance: Southpaw

Boxing record
- Total fights: 65
- Wins: 46
- Win by KO: 38
- Losses: 16
- Draws: 3

Bertoldo Batawang Jr. (born October 26, 1971, in Cebu City, Cebu, Philippines), more commonly known as Bert Batawang, is a Filipino professional boxer.

== Boxing career ==
=== Early career ===
Batawang began his professional career in 1990, winning against Lolong Quiban by a first-round technical knockout. Batawang suffered multiple losses early in his career, and in 1995, he temporarily retired from the sport after losing a ten-round decision to future WBC Light Flyweight World Champion, Yo-Sam Choi (7-0) of South Korea.

After five years away from the sport, Batawang made his ring return in 2000, fighting against unheralded Randy Narbay, whom he defeated by knockout (KO) in six rounds. He later went on to win the Philippines Boxing Federation (PBF) Light Flyweight title one year later, defeating Flash Villacura who held the title at the time. Two bouts later, Batawang lost a 12-round decision to future IBF Minimumweight World Champion, Muhammad Rachman of Indonesia. After losing to Rachman, Batawang defended his PBF Light Flyweight title a total of five times before winning the Philippines Games & Amusement Board (GAB) version of the title, after a failed bid against Wyndel Janiola.

A year later, he vied for the OPBF Light Flyweight title, then held by Shingo Yamaguchi of Japan. Batawang lost the fight by split decision (SD), by scores of 117-113, 116-113 for Yamaguchi, and a scorecard of 115-113 for Batawang. Following this bout, Batawang managed to defeat Sithembile Kibiti of South Africa, winning the fight by KO in seven rounds, and also winning the then vacant WBA Pan African Light Flyweight title.

=== First World Title shot ===
After winning eight of his next nine fights, Batawang vied for his first world title against the then IBF Light Flyweight World Champion, Ulises Solís of Mexico. On December 15, 2007, in Guadalajara, Jalisco, Mexico, Batawang failed in his bid for the IBF crown, losing to Solís by technical knockout (TKO) in the ninth round of the bout. The champion dismantled Batawang since the start of the fight, until the referee finally stopped the fight. "Batawang would later say after the fight that he was hit by Solis with a hard left over his right rib cage in the 5th round that practically immobilized him in the remainder of the contest".

=== Is there anything left? ===
Batawang won his next three fights after suffering the huge setback against Solís, also winning the then vacant WBO Oriental Light Flyweight title in the process after defeating Samransak Singmanassak of Thailand. In his first defense of the WBO Oriental title, he lost to fellow Filipino, Edren Dapudong by TKO in seven rounds. After losing to Dapudong, Batawang traveled to Linyi, China, fighting Jack Amisa of Indonesia. "The Ninja" used his stealth and wit to defeat the Indonesian by knockout in the fifth round of the bout, winning the then vacant WBO Asia Pacific Light Flyweight title.

He fought Ulises Solis on March 27, 2010, for the IBF Light Flyweight Title Eliminator. The fight was held at the Plaza Pueblo Antiguo in Mexico. The winner of the rematch between Batawang and Solis, which was originally scheduled for March 6, will become the mandatory challenger for IBF light flyweight titlist Carlos Tamara, who defeated former champion Brian Viloria in January by TKO.

In the first three rounds the bout was fairly even. However, in the next rounds, Solis’ power and Batawang's age began to tell: Batawang was floored in the 4th round and the Mexican fighter hammered him during the 5th round. The Filipino veteran boxer remained on his stool and was forced to retire at the beginning of the sixth round.

With the win Solis improved to 30-2-2 with 21 knockouts while Batawang dropped to 45-15-3 with 17 knockouts.

== Professional boxing record ==
65 fights	46 wins	16 losses
By knockout	38	4
By decision	8	12
Draws	3	

No.	Result	Record	Opponent	Type	Round, Time	Date	Location	Notes
65	Loss	46-16-3	Isack Junior	UD	12	17 Sep 2011	Maumere, Indonesia	For WBO Asia Pacific Super Flyweight title
64	Win	46-15-3	Renante Rondina	TKO	6 (8) 2:05	20 Aug 2011	Aurora Gym, Aurora, Philippines	
63	Loss	45-15-3	Ulises Solis	RTD	6 (12)	27 Mar 2010	Explanada de Pueblo Antiguo, Esenada, Mexico	IBF Light Flyweight Title Eliminator
62	Win	45-14-3	Jack Amisa	KO	5 (12) 1:45	28 Nov 2009	Linyi, China	Won vacant WBO Asia Pacific Light Flyweight title
61	Loss	44-14-3	Edrin Dapudong	TKO	7 (12) 0:42	25 Apr 2009	Cebu Coliseum, Cebu City, Philippines	Lost WBO Oriental Light Flyweight title
60	Win	44-13-3	Benjie Sorolla	TD	6 (10) 0:08	19 Jul 2008	Cebu Coliseum, Cebu City, Philippines	
59	Win	43-13-3	Ophat Niampren	KO	4 (12) 0:37	3 May 2008	Cebu Coliseum, Cebu City, Philippines	Won vacant WBO Oriental Light Flyweight title
58	Win	42-13-3	Heri Amol	KO	7 (10) 0:30	6 Apr 2008	Araneta Coliseum, Barangay Cubao, Quezon City, Philippines	
57	Loss	41-13-3	Ulises Solis	TKO	9 (12) 2:33	15 Dec 2007	Auditorio Benito Juarez, Guadalajara, Mexico	For IBF Light Flyweight title
56	Win	41-12-3	Sofyan Effendi	TKO	4 (10) 2:12	24 Feb 2007	Cebu City Sports Complex, Cebu City, Philippines	
55	Win	40-12-3	Pingping Tepura	KO	1 (10) 2:48	21 Jan 2007	Gaisano Country Mall Parking Lot, Barangay Banilad, Cebu City, Philippines	
54	Win	39-12-3	Rey Orais	KO	1 (10) 1:14	8 Dec 2006	Talisay Sports Complex, Talisay City	
53	Win	38-12-3	Robert Rubillar	KO	3 (10) 2:36	9 Sep 2006	Danao Sports Complex, Danao City	
52	Win	37-12-3	Noel Veronque	TKO	2 (10) 1:21	22 Apr 2006	Barangay Paltok, Quezon City, Philippines	
51	Loss	36-12-3	Hiroyuki Kudaka	TKO	2 (10) 0:44	3 Dec 2005	Central Hall, Osaka, Japan	
50	Win	36-11-3	Eugene Gonzales	TKO	5 (10) 2:23	17 Sep 2005	Mandaue City Sports and Cultural Complex, Barangay Centro, Mandaue City, Philippines	
49	Win	35-11-3	Elmer Muyco	RTD	1 (10)	11 Jun 2005	Mandaue City Sports and Cultural Complex, Barangay Centro, Mandaue City, Philippines	Muyco went to his corner at the end of round 1 and decide not to continue after suffering a broken left arm
48	Win	34-11-3	Robert Rubillar	TKO	7 (10) 2:57	30 Apr 2005	Mandaue City Sports and Cultural Complex, Barangay Centro, Mandaue City, Philippines	
47	Win	33-11-3	Sithembile Kibiti	KO	7 (12) 1:58	20 Nov 2004	Oliver Thambo Hall, Khayelitsha, Cape Town, South Africa	
46	Loss	32-11-3	Shingo Yamaguchi	SD	12	9 Aug 2004	Korakuen Hall, Tokyo, Japan	For OPBF Light Flyweight title
45	Win	32-10-3	Along Denoy	TKO	2 (10) 2:24	4 Apr 2004	Mandaue City Sports and Cultural Complex, Barangay Centro, Mandaue City, Philippines	
44	Win	31-10-3	Roger Maldecir	KO	4 (12) 1:20	4 Oct 2003	Mandaue City Sports and Cultural Complex, Barangay Centro, Mandaue City, Philippines	Defended Philippines Games & Amusements Board(GAB) Filipino Light Flyweight title
43	Win	30-10-3	Sherwin Manatad	TKO	3 (10) 2:39	26 Jul 2003	Mandaue City Sports and Cultural Complex, Barangay Centro, Mandaue City, Philippines	
42	Win	29-10-3	Erdene Chuluun	UD	10	22 Feb 2003	Gangneung, South Korea	
41	Win	28-10-3	Rodel Quilaton	UD	12	19 Jan 2003	Cantada Sports Center, Barangay Bagumbayan, Taguig City, Philippines	Won vacant Philippine Games & Amusements Board(GAB) Filipino Light Flyweight title
40	Win	27-10-3	Darius Alfante	TKO	6 (10) 2:23	16 Dec 2002	Municipal Coliseum, Sogod, Philippines	Defended Philippines Boxing Federation(PBF) Light Flyweight title
39	Win	26-10-3	Nelson Llanos	RTD	2 (8)	30 Nov 2002	Carmen, Cebu, Philippines	
38	Win	25-10-3	Jovan Presbitero	TD	9 (10) ?	19 Oct 2002	Mandaue City Sports & Cultural Complex, Barangay Centro, Mandaue City, Philippines	Two successive accidental cuts caused by head-butts forced the stoppage; Defended Philippines Boxing Federation(PBF) Light Flyweight title
37	Win	24-10-3	Marvin DelaCruz	TKO	6 (10) 2:57	27 Sep 2002	Mandaluyong Gym, Mandaluyong Sports Center, Mandaluyong City, Philippines	Defended Philippines Boxing Federation(PBF) Light Flyweight title
36	Loss	23-10-3	Wyndel Janiola	UD	12	26 Jul 2002	Cebu City Waterfront Hotel & Casino, Barangay Lahug, Cebu City, Philippines	For Philippine Games & Amusements Board(GAB) Filipino Light Flyweight title
35	Win	23-9-3	Steve Demaisap	RTD	7 (10)	2 Jun 2002	Makati Coliseum, Makati City, Philippines	
34	Win	22-9-3	Roger Maldecir	KO	3 (12) 0:36	18 Feb 2002	Caburan Park, Jose Abad Santos, Philippines	Defended Philippines Boxing Federation (PBF) Light Flyweight title
33	Loss	21-9-3	Muhammad Rachman	UD	10	21 Jan 2002	Jakarta, Indonesia	
32	Win	21-8-3	Lolito Laroa	UD	10	7 Dec 2001	Mandaue City Sports and Cultural Complex, Barangay Centro, Mandaue City, Philippines	
31	Win	20-8-3	Flash Villacura	TKO	7 (12) 1:53	24 Oct 2001	Baganga, Davao Oriental, Philippines	Won Philippines Boxing Federation(PBF) Light Flyweight title
30	Win	19-8-3	Alex Guevarra	UD	10	29 Sep 2001	Cebu City, Cebu, Philippines	
29	Win	18-8-3	Roselito Campana	TKO	7 (10) ?	10 Aug 2001	Barangay Lahug, Cebu City, Philippines	
28	Loss	17-8-3	Ray Ganton	MD	10	2 May 2001	Alvarez Covered Court, District of Santa Cruz, Manila, Philippines	
27	Win	17-7-3	Jun Ebale	UD	8	31 Mar 2001	Cebu City Waterfront Hotel & Casino, Barangay Lahug, Cebu City, Philippines	
26	Loss	16-7-3	Celso Danggod	UD	10	6 Mar 2001	Laguna, Philippines	
25	Win	16-6-3	Freddie Gimay	TKO	5 (8) ?	2 Dec 2000	Cebu Coliseum, Cebu City, Philippines	
24	Win	15-6-3	Randy Narbay	KO	6 (8) 2:19	28 Oct 2000	Mandaue City, Cebu, Philippines	
23	Loss	14-6-3	Yo Sam Choi	UD	10	15 Jan 1995	Jeongeup, South Korea	
22	Win	14-5-3	Chris Galon	TKO	2 (10) ?	22 Dec 1994	Elorde Sports Center, Paranaque City, Philippines	
21	Win	13-5-3	Joel Revilla	TKO	1 (10) ?	29 Sep 1994	Elorde Sports Center, Paranaque City, Philippines	
20	Win	12-5-3	Ambert Espanola	TKO	3 (10) ?	14 Jul 1994	Elorde Ports Center, Paranaque City, Philippines	
19	Win	11-5-3	Fidel Valcorza	KO	1 (10) ?	2 Jun 1994	Elorde Sports Center, Paranaque City, Philippines	
18	Win	10-5-3	Roger Espanola	TKO	4 (10) ?	26 Mar 1994	Cebu Coliseum, Cebu City, Philippines	
17	Loss	9-5-3	Jerry Pahayahay	UD	10	15 May 1993	Mandaue City, Cebu, Philippines	
16	Win	9-4-3	Rading Bardago	TKO	2 (8) ?	2 Jan 1993	Barangay Busay, Cebu City, Philippines	
15	Loss	8-4-3	Jerry Pahayahay	SD	8	7 Nov 1992	Cebu City, Cebu, Philippines	
14	Win	8-3-3	Charlie Baguio	KO	1 (8) ?	26 Sep 1992	Argao, Cebu, Philippines	
13	Win	7-3-3	Efren Garcia	TKO	5 (6) ?	12 Aug 1992	Ninoy Aquino Stadium, District of Malate, Manila, Philippines	
12	Win	6-3-3	Elmer Alba	KO	1 (6) ?	23 May 1992	Cebu City, Cebu, Philippines	
11	Win	5-3-3	Raffy Anoos	TKO	2 (6) ?	27 Mar 1992	Lapu-Lapu City, Cebu, Philippines	
10	Win	4-3-3	Ray Nognog	UD	6	31 Aug 1991	Cebu City, Cebu, Philippines	
9	Win	3-3-3	Rey Sarne	TKO	(4)	6 Jul 1991	Tanjay City, Negros Oriental, Philippines	
8	Win	2-3-3	Deny Abellanosa	TKO	2 (4) ?	15 Jun 1991	Cebu Coliseum, Cebu City, Philippines	
7	Loss	1-3-3	Ronnie Canete	MD	4	18 May 1991	Cebu City, Cebu, Philippines	
6	Loss	1-2-3	Ronnie Canete	UD	4	20 Apr 1991	Negros Oriental, Philippines	
5	Draw	1-1-3	Rick Tibay	PTS	4	23 Feb 1991	Cebu City, Cebu, Philippines	
4	Draw	1-1-2	Little Trasona	PTS	4	19 Jan 1991	Cebu City, Cebu, Philippines	
3	Draw	1-1-1	Deny Abellanosa	MD	4	23 Dec 1990	Negros Occidental, Philippines	
2	Loss	1-1-0	Roy Clave	UD	4	30 Nov 1990	Surigao City, Surigao del Norte, Philippines	
1	Win	1-0-0	Lolong Quiban	TKO	1 (4) ?	13 Oct 1990	Surigao del Sur, Philippines	
