= Will Grigsby =

American boxer

Personal information
- Nickname: Steel Will
- Born: William Henry Grigsby; March 19, 1970 (age 56) Saint Paul, Minnesota, U.S.
- Height: 5 ft 4 in (163 cm)
- Weight: Light flyweight; Flyweight

Boxing career
- Reach: 66 in (168 cm)
- Stance: Orthodox

Boxing record
- Total fights: 24
- Wins: 18
- Win by KO: 7
- Losses: 4
- Draws: 1
- No contests: 1

William Henry Grigsby (born March 19, 1970) is an American former professional boxer who competed from 1988 to 2007 and held the IBF junior flyweight title twice between 1998 and 2006. He also won the WBO junior flyweight title in 2000, but was stripped of the title for failing a drug test.

== Professional career ==
Grigsby turned pro in 1988 and lost his second professional fight, to flyweight legend Michael Carbajal who was making his professional debut. In 1998 he captured the vacant IBF light flyweight title by decisioning Ratanapol Sor Vorapin. He defended the belt once before losing it to Ricardo Lopez in 1999. In 2000 he captured the WBO light flyweight title with a decision win over Nelson Dieppa, but was stripped of the belt after the fight for testing positive for marijuana. The fight changed to no decision. He fought sporadically before capturing the IBF light flyweight title with a decision over Victor Burgos in 2005. He lost the belt in his first defense to Ulises Solís, and lost a rematch with Solís in 2007.

== Professional boxing record ==
24 fights	18 wins	4 losses
By knockout	7	1
By decision	11	3
Draws	1	
No contests	1	

No.	Result	Record	Opponent	Type	Round, time	Date	Location	Notes
24	Loss	18–4–1 (1)	Ulises Solís	RTD	8 (12), 3:00	Jan 25, 2007	Orleans Hotel & Casino, Paradise, Nevada, U.S.	For IBF junior flyweight title
23	Loss	18–3–1 (1)	Ulises Solís	UD	12	Jan 7, 2006	Madison Square Garden, New York City, New York, U.S.	Lost IBF junior flyweight title
22	Win	18–2–1 (1)	Víctor Burgos	UD	12	May 14, 2005	MGM Grand Garden Arena, Paradise, Nevada, U.S.	Won IBF junior flyweight title
21	Win	17–2–1 (1)	Ruben Contreras	UD	8	Jan 28, 2005	Farm Bureau Building, Indianapolis, Indiana, U.S.	
20	Win	16–2–1 (1)	Ruben Poma	TKO	1 (8), 1:42	Nov 27, 2004	Riehle Brothers Pavilion, Lafayette, Indiana, U.S.	
19	Win	15–2–1 (1)	Kenny Berrios	UD	8	Jun 28, 2002	Civic Center, Kissimmee, Florida, U.S.	
18	NC	14–2–1 (1)	Nelson Dieppa	UD	12	Jul 22, 2000	American Airlines Arena, Miami, Florida, U.S.	Vacant WBO junior flyweight title at stake; Originally a UD win for Grisby; later ruled an NC after he failed a drug test
17	Loss	14–2–1	Ricardo López	UD	12	Oct 2, 1999	Hilton Hotel, Paradise, Nevada, U.S.	Lost IBF junior flyweight title
16	Win	14–1–1	Carmelo Caceres	UD	12	Mar 6, 1999	UM Sports Pavilion, Minneapolis, Minnesota, U.S.	Retained IBF junior flyweight title
15	Win	13–1–1	Ratanapol Sor Vorapin	UD	12	Dec 18, 1998	Memorial Auditorium, Fort Lauderdale, Florida, U.S.	Won vacant IBF junior flyweight title
14	Draw	12–1–1	Fernando Ibarra	TD	1 (8), 0:45	Nov 13, 1998	Jackpot Junction Casino, Morton, Minnesota, U.S.	
13	Win	12–1	Javier Cintron	UD	12	Feb 13, 1998	The Pit, Albuquerque, New Mexico, U.S.	Retained USBA flyweight title
12	Win	11–1	Jesus Lopez	UD	8	Oct 4, 1997	Rochester, Minnesota, U.S.	
11	Win	10–1	Jose Luis De Jesus	TD	4 (4)	May 10, 1997	Convention Center, Coconut Grove, Florida, U.S.	
10	Win	9–1	Jesus Lopez	PTS	12	Oct 10, 1996	Rochester, Minnesota, U.S.	Won vacant USBA flyweight title
9	Win	8–1	Roberto Romero	UD	6	Apr 20, 1996	Engelstad Arena, Grand Forks, North Dakota, U.S.	
8	Win	7–1	Eduardo Manzano	TKO	7 (8)	Mar 2, 1996	Minneapolis, Minnesota, U.S.	
7	Win	6–1	Jesus Garcia	TKO	4 (6)	Jul 14, 1995	Rochester, Minnesota, U.S.	
6	Win	5–1	Juan Camero	TKO	3 (6)	Jun 10, 1995	Rosemount, Minnesota, U.S.	
5	Win	4–1	Orlando Malone	UD	6	Mar 17, 1995	Mystic Lake Casino, Prior Lake, Minnesota, U.S.	
4	Win	3–1	Miguel Montoya	KO	3 (4)	Mar 7, 1995	Mystic Lake Casino, Prior Lake, Minnesota, U.S.	
3	Win	2–1	Dallas Hawkins	KO	1 (4)	Sep 30, 1994	Saint Paul, Minnesota, U.S.	
2	Loss	1–1	Michael Carbajal	UD	4	Feb 24, 1989	Convention Center, Atlantic City, New Jersey, U.S.	
1	Win	1–0	Ed Meeks	TKO	3 (4)	Nov 23, 1988	Promenade Center Ballroom, Saint Paul, Minnesota, U.S.	

Sporting positions
Regional boxing titles
Vacant Title last held by Jose Luis Zepeda	USBA flyweight champion October 10, 1996 – June 1998; Vacated	Vacant Title next held by Pedro Pena
World boxing titles
Vacant Title last held by Mauricio Pastrana	IBF junior flyweight champion December 18, 1998 – October 2, 1999	Succeeded by Ricardo López
Preceded by Víctor Burgos	IBF junior flyweight champion May 14, 2005 – January 7, 2006	Succeeded by Ulises Solís
