= John Riel Casimero =

Filipino boxer (born 1989)

- Born: John Riel Reponte Casimero; February 13, 1989 (age 37); Merida, Leyte, Philippines
- Other name: Quadro Alas ("Four Aces")
- Boxing career
- Height: 5 ft 4 in (163 cm)
- Weight: Light-flyweight; Flyweight; Bantamweight; Super-bantamweight; Super-featherweight
- Reach: 70 in (178 cm)
- Stance: Orthodox

Boxing record
- Total fights: 42
- Wins: 36
- Win by KO: 25
- Losses: 5
- Draws: 1

YouTube information
- Channel: Quadro alas tv vlog
- Genres: Sports, vlog, entertainment, commentary, public service
- Subscribers: 90,500
- Views: 12.68 million
- Last updated: September 11, 2025

John Riel Reponte Casimero (born February 13, 1989) is a Filipino professional boxer and YouTuber. He has held world championships in three weight classes including the International Boxing Federation (IBF) junior-flyweight title from 2012 to 2013, the IBF flyweight title in 2016, and the World Boxing Organization (WBO) bantamweight title from 2019 to 2022.

Casimero has attracted significant controversy for his conduct outside of the ring, including allegations of sexual assault and threats against boxing personalities.

== Professional career ==
=== Early career at flyweight and light-flyweight ===
On August 23, 2008, just a year after turning pro, Casimero defeated Rodel Quilaton for the then vacant Philippines Boxing Federeration (PBF) flyweight title, winning a unanimous decision (UD) through ten rounds. Following the bout, Casimero moved down one division, to light flyweight, defeating Liempetch Sor Veerapol of Thailand by technical knockout (TKO) in the fifth round to claim the then vacant WBO Asia Pacific Light Flyweight title. Casimero successfully defended that title two bouts later against Ardin Diale, until he got the biggest break of his career.

=== Light-flyweight ===
==== Casimero vs. Canchila ====
On December 19, 2009, in Managua, Nicaragua, Casimero won the then-vacant interim WBO light flyweight title, by defeating former interim WBA Light Flyweight champion César Canchila of Colombia. Canchila had a record of 28–2 coming into the bout, with his last loss coming from current WBA light flyweight world champion Giovanni Segura, whom he previously defeated for the interim title. Casimero gave a spectacular performance, the fight being his first outside his home country. He was able to knockdown Canchila multiple times until the referee finally stopped the bout in the 11th round of the scheduled 12 round interim title fight. This win can give Casimero a title shot against Iván Calderón of Puerto Rico, who previously defeated Filipino boxer Rodel Mayol.

==== Casimero vs. Hirales ====
Casimero fought Ramón García Hirales on July 3, 2010, for his first defense of the interim WBO light flyweight title but lost by split decision.

=== Flyweight ===
==== Casimero vs. Mthalane ====
Casimero got his first shot at a world title when he challenged Moruti Mthalane of South Africa for the IBF flyweight title on March 26, 2011. He was, however, stopped by the South African in five rounds, therefore marking his second career loss.

=== Return to light-flyweight ===
==== Casimero vs. Lazarte ====
On February 11, 2012, Casimero, and members of his team were kicked and assaulted when fans in Mar del Plata hurled chairs and stormed the ring following his 10th-round knockout of local Argentine fighter Luis Alberto Lazarte for the IBF interim junior flyweight championship. After the riot, police escorted Casimero and his team to their hotel and provided protection for them. Lazarte later visited to apologize. The Philippines has filed a diplomatic protest to the Argentine government after Argentine fans attacked Casimero in the ring after winning the title bout. Philippine Foreign Affairs spokesman Raul Hernandez stated that the Philippine Embassy in Buenos Aires filed a protest with Argentina's Ministry of Foreign Affairs and is awaiting an explanation. Lazarte was banned by IBF for threat, sparking a ring riot.

On July 19, 2012, Casimero was upgraded to the status of full IBF junior flyweight champion because of the inability of Ulises Solis to defend his title on or before October 30.

==== Casimero vs. Guevara ====
On his first defense of the IBF junior flyweight title, Casimero faced Pedro Guevara of Mexico on August 4, 2012. He scored a knockdown in the opening round and fought to a split decision victory.

He successfully made a second defense of his title against WBC Latino light flyweight champion Luis Alberto Rios on March 16, 2013. His third defense was against Felipe Salguero on October 26, 2013, and he won by eleventh-round knockout.

=== Return to flyweight ===
==== Casimero vs. Ruenroeng I & II ====
Following his win against Mauricio Fuentes and Armando Santos, Casimero moved back up to the flyweight division. On June 27, 2015, he lost his return to flyweight bout via unanimous decision against IBF champion Amnat Ruenroeng in a controversial match. A rematch on May 25, 2016, Casimero challenged Ruenroeng again for the IBF flyweight title and this time he knocked Ruenreong out with a vicious left hook to the body in the fourth round to become a two-division world champion. The rematch took place in China, where it was watched by over 200 million viewers and drew a 4.7 rating on CCTV-5 according to the IBF China press-release (Sina Sports reported 160 million viewers and a 0.87 rating).

==== Casimero vs. Edwards ====
In his second title defence, Casimero faced undefeated Charlie Edwards, on September 10, 2016, on the undercard of Gennady Golovkin vs. Kell Brook at The O2 Arena in London, England. Casimero was on the offensive for most of the fight, as Edwards was unable to deal with Casimero's ring craft. Casimero upped the pace in the tenth round, and dropped Edwards with a left hook. Edwards beat the count, but as soon as he got up, Casimero unleashed a flurry of punches towards the challenger, which prompted the referee to end the fight immediately.

=== Super flyweight ===
On September 16, 2017, Casimero faced Jonas Sultan in an IBF title eliminator. He lost via 12-round unanimous decision.

=== Bantamweight ===
Following Casimero's successful title defense against Charlie Edwards in September 2016, he moved up in weight, fighting in non-title bouts at super-flyweight, bantamweight and even one bout against Jose Pech at featherweight before settling at the bantamweight division, where he defeated Ricardo Espinoza Franco via twelfth-round knockout to win the WBO interim bantamweight title in his first fight in the United States on April 20, 2019. He defended the interim title on August 24, 2019, against Cesar Ramirez, winning via tenth-round knockout, to become full WBO bantamweight titleholder Zolani Tete's mandatory challenger, setting up a showdown with Tete.

==== Casimero vs. Tete ====
On November 30, 2019, Casimero challenged Zolani Tete for his WBO bantamweight title in Birmingham, England. Despite Tete being the favorite for the fight, Casimero scored a third-round knockout over the long-reigning champion to capture his WBO bantamweight title. The victory meant that Casimero became a three-division world champion.

==== Cancelled bout vs. Naoya Inoue ====
Casimero have scheduled to face undefeated unified bantamweight champion Naoya Inoue in a unification clash on April 25, 2020, but the COVID-19 pandemic caused the fight to be cancelled. He instead faced the undefeated Duke Micah, ranked #11 by the WBO, in his first WBO bantamweight title defense on September 26, 2020, on the undercard of The Charlos vs. Dereyvanchenko and Rosario. Casimero recorded another stoppage win, again in the third round, to retain his WBO belt.

==== Casimero vs. Rigondeaux ====
It was announced on June 19, 2021, that WBC champion Nonito Donaire would replace Rigondeaux, but when the fight between Casimero and Donaire fell apart over insults directed at Donaire's wife, Rigondeaux stepped back in to fight Casimero as had been originally planned. Casimero faced two-time Olympic gold medalist Guillermo Rigondeaux on August 14, 2021. In a low-key affair that saw the CompuBox record broken for fewest combined landed punches in a 12-round fight, Casimero pressured his opponent all night, fighting on the front foot and throwing more punches than Rigondeaux, who was reluctant to engage. Casimero was rewarded with a split decision victory, with scores of 117–111 and 116–112 in his favor, and 115–113 in favor of Rigondeaux.

In his post-fight interview, Casimero criticized his opponent's extremely passive gameplan, saying "I'm focused on [the] knockout, but Rigondeaux always runs. Rigondeaux just always runs. No fighting." He continued by reaffirming that it is his intention to unify the bantamweight division, targeting the division's other titleholders, Nonito Donaire and Naoya Inoue. Casimero concluded his interview by issuing the middle finger to Inoue.

==== Cancelled bout vs. Paul Butler ====
Casimero had been scheduled to fight his mandatory challenger and former IBF bantamweight champion Paul Butler on December 11, 2021, at Coca-Cola Arena in Dubai, United Arab Emirates. Casimero withdrew before the weigh-ins after being rushed to the hospital due to viral gastritis. The bout had been rescheduled on April 22, 2022, at M&S Bank Arena in Liverpool, England but Casimero was not permitted to fight by the British Boxing Board of Control (BBBofC) due to medical guidelines violation by using a sauna to cut weight "in close proximity" to the fight. Casimero's late replacement, fellow Filipino Jonas Sultan, lost to Butler by unanimous decision, making Butler the interim champion. On May 4, the WBO stripped Casimero of the title, with Butler supplanting him.

=== Super Bantamweight ===
On December 3, 2022, Casimero fought Japan's Ryo Akaho in a match in South Korea that was initially ruled a no contest before being revised to a knockout in favor of Casimero by the Korean Boxing Member Commission (KBM), which reviewed the matter upon the Games and Amusements Board's appeal. Later on, Casimero officially signed a contract under Treasure Boxing Promotion with the Japanese startup led by former world champion and CEO Masayuki Ito in February 2023. Casimero made a successful homecoming, dethroning Namibia's Fillipus Nghitumbwa via unanimous decision win to claim the WBO Global super bantamweight title at the Okada Manila in Paranaque City on May 13, 2023.

==== Casimero vs. Oguni ====
Casimero made his debut in Japan by taking on former IBF super bantamweight champion Yukinori Oguni on October 12, 2023, at the Ariake Arena in Tokyo, Japan. The bout ended with a Controversial Technical Draw because of an accidental headbutt.

On October 13, 2024, Casimero won the super bantamweight match after defeating Saul Sanchez via knockout on the first round in Yokohama. On October 15, he was suspended by the Japan Boxing Commission for one year after he had exceeded the 122-pound weight-in limit prior to the match on October 12.

=== Super Featherweight ===
==== Casimero vs. Kameda ====
In 2025, Casimero has signed with Kōki Kameda's SaikouXLush Boxing Promotion for three fights. Casimero previously inked a deal with Masayuki Ito's Treasure Boxing Promotion in 2023, but their partnership didn't pan out after just four fights. It was announced during the press conference on September 19, 2025, in Japan that Casimero is scheduled to fight Kyonosuke Kameda in a 10-round match moving up to Super featherweight division at a catchweight of (58 kg) at Bishkek Arena in Kyrgyzstan on October 25, 2025. Casimero lost via Unanimous Decision (92–98, 92–99, 93–97).

==== Casimero vs. Mizokoshi ====
Casimero defeated Tom Mizokoshi by technical knockout in the fifth of their scheduled eight-round contest at Aichi Sky Expo in Tokoname, Japan, on 27 December 2025.

==== Casimero vs. Nery ====
In March 2026, it was announced that Casimero was scheduled to fight former WBC and The Ring bantamweight, WBC super bantamweight champion and previously, the undisputed super bantamweight title challenger Luis Nery on April 18, 2026, in Bishkek, Kyrgyzstan. The bout was scheduled to headline the SaikouXLush vol. 6 event for the vacant WBA Gold super bantamweight championship. However, on April 2, the event would be cancelled alongside two others in the same venue due to rapid changes in the current international situation, allegedly caused by the 2026 Iran war. Eventually, Casimero's bout against Nery was rescheduled to June 6, 2026, at 3150FIGHT vol. 10, in Aichi Sky Expo, Tokoname, Japan. Their bout was now settled for a 10-rounder catchweight of 126 pounds. During the day of weigh-in, Casimero was able to make weight, weighing 123.4 pounds, however, in a surprising twist, Nery was overweight, scaling in at 127.2 pounds, 3.2 pounds over the agreed catchweight. Nery was given a punishment, where he is unable to weight beyond 134 pounds tomorrow morning and he was fined a certain amount, he may also face further punishment from the JBC. Casimero knocked Nery to that canvas six times throughout the fight and eventually won by stoppage in the fourth round.

== Professional boxing record ==
42 fights	36 wins	5 losses
By knockout	25	1
By decision	11	4
Draws	1	

No.	Result	Record	Opponent	Type	Round, time	Date	Location	Notes
42	Win	36–5–1	Luis Nery	TKO	4 (10), 0:42	Jun 6, 2026	Aichi Sky Expo, Tokoname, Japan	
41	Win	35–5–1	Tom Mizokoshi	TKO	5 (8), 1:10	Dec 27, 2025	Aichi Sky Expo, Tokoname, Japan	
40	Loss	34–5–1	Kyonosuke Kameda	UD	10	Oct 25, 2025	Bishkek Arena, Bishkek, Kyrgyzstan	
39	Win	34–4–1	Saul Sanchez	TKO	1 (10), 2:41	Oct 13, 2024	Yokohama Budokan, Yokohama, Japan	
38	Draw	33–4–1	Yukinori Oguni	TD	4 (10), 0:27	Oct 12, 2023	Ariake Arena, Tokyo, Japan	TD: Oguni cut from an accidental head clash
37	Win	33–4	Fillipus Nghitumbwa	UD	12	May 13, 2023	Okada Manila Hotel and Casino, Parañaque, Philippines	Won WBO Global super bantamweight title
36	Win	32–4	Ryo Akaho	KO	2 (10), 2:25	Dec 3, 2022	Paradise City Plaza, Incheon, South Korea	Originally an NC, it was changed to a KO after a review by the Korea Boxing Member Commission
35	Win	31–4	Guillermo Rigondeaux	SD	12	Aug 14, 2021	Dignity Health Sports Park, Carson, California, U.S.	Retained WBO bantamweight title
34	Win	30–4	Duke Micah	TKO	3 (12), 0:54	Sep 26, 2020	Mohegan Sun Arena, Montville, Connecticut, U.S.	Retained WBO bantamweight title
33	Win	29–4	Zolani Tete	TKO	3 (12), 2:14	Nov 30, 2019	Arena Birmingham, Birmingham, England	Won WBO bantamweight title
32	Win	28–4	Cesar Ramirez	KO	10 (12), 2:23	Aug 24, 2019	San Andres Civic & Sports Center, Manila, Philippines	Retained WBO interim bantamweight title
31	Win	27–4	Ricardo Espinoza Franco	KO	12 (12), 0:44	Apr 20, 2019	Dignity Health Sports Park, Carson, California, US	Won vacant WBO interim bantamweight title
30	Win	26–4	Kenya Yamashita	TKO	6 (10), 0:47	Feb 16, 2019	Midas Hotel and Casino, Pasay, Philippines	
29	Win	25–4	Jose Pech	TKO	2 (6), 1:41	Jul 21, 2018	Casino Hipodromo Agua Caliente, Tijuana, Mexico	
28	Loss	24–4	Jonas Sultan	UD	12	Sep 16, 2017	Waterfront Hotel & Casino, Cebu City, Philippines	
27	Win	24–3	Jecker Buhawe	UD	6	Jun 25, 2017	Iligan Public Plaza, Iligan, Philippines	
26	Win	23–3	Charlie Edwards	TKO	10 (12), 1:57	Sep 10, 2016	The O2 Arena, London, England	Retained IBF flyweight title
25	Win	22–3	Amnat Ruenroeng	KO	4 (12), 2:10	May 25, 2016	Diamond Court, Beijing, China	Won IBF flyweight title
24	Loss	21–3	Amnat Ruenroeng	UD	12	Jun 27, 2015	Indoor Stadium Huamark, Bangkok, Thailand	For IBF flyweight title
23	Win	21–2	Armando Santos	TKO	2 (12)	Dec 13, 2014	Salón Las Palmas, Pesquería, Mexico	
22	Win	20–2	Mauricio Fuentes	KO	1 (12), 2:59	May 3, 2014	Waterfront Hotel & Casino, Cebu City, Philippines	IBF light flyweight title at stake only for Fuentes as Casimero missed weight
21	Win	19–2	Felipe Salguero	TKO	11 (12), 1:34	Oct 26, 2013	Makati Coliseum, Makati, Philippines	Retained IBF light flyweight title
20	Win	18–2	Luis Alberto Rios	UD	12	Mar 16, 2013	Megapolis Convention Center, Panama City, Panama	Retained IBF light flyweight title
19	Win	17–2	Pedro Guevara	SD	12	Aug 4, 2012	Centro de Convenciones, Mazatlán, Mexico	Retained IBF light flyweight title
18	Win	16–2	Luis Alberto Lazarte	TKO	10 (12), 1:09	Feb 10, 2012	Club Once Unidos, Mar del Plata, Argentina	Won inaugural IBF interim light flyweight title
17	Win	15–2	Roemart Sentillas	TKO	2 (10)	Oct 15, 2011	Hoops Dome, Lapu-Lapu, Philippines	
16	Loss	14–2	Moruti Mthalane	TKO	5 (12), 1:50	Mar 26, 2011	Nasrec Indoor Arena, Johannesburg, South Africa	For IBF flyweight title
15	Loss	14–1	Ramón García Hirales	SD	12	Jul 24, 2010	Polideportivo Centenario, Los Mochis, Mexico	Lost WBO interim light flyweight title
14	Win	14–0	César Canchila	TKO	11 (12), 1:40	Dec 19, 2009	Dennis Martínez National Stadium, Managua, Nicaragua	Won vacant WBO interim light flyweight title
13	Win	13–0	Ardin Diale	KO	8 (12), 1:42	May 28, 2009	Cebu Coliseum, Cebu City, Philippines	Retained WBO Asia Pacific light flyweight title
12	Win	12–0	Allan Ranada	UD	8	May 8, 2009	Sports Complex, Naga, Philippines	
11	Win	11–0	Liempetch Sor Veerapol	TKO	5 (12), 1:02	Oct 3, 2008	Sports Complex, Talisay, Philippines	Won vacant WBO Asia Pacific light flyweight title
10	Win	10–0	Rodel Quilaton	UD	10	Aug 23, 2008	Eusebio Sestoso Memorial Coliseum, Alcoy, Philippines	Won vacant PBF flyweight title
9	Win	9–0	Roemart Sentillas	TKO	3 (10)	Jul 17, 2008	Compostela, Cebu, Philippines	
8	Win	8–0	Roel Honor	TKO	1 (10)	Jun 12, 2008	Baybay City Sports Complex, Baybay, Philippines	
7	Win	7–0	Daryl Amoncio	MD	8	Apr 21, 2008	City Auditorium, Lapu-Lapu, Philippines	
6	Win	6–0	Jerome Bontog	KO	3 (6)	Mar 29, 2008	City Plaza Square, Mandaue, Philippines	
5	Win	5–0	Rogen Flores	TD	6 (8)	Jan 12, 2008	Sports Center, Borbon, Philippines	
4	Win	4–0	Dodong Zalde	KO	2 (6), 1:04	Dec 16, 2007	Sports Center, Carmen, Philippines	
3	Win	3–0	Roel Honor	UD	6	Aug 26, 2007	Sports Center, Daanbantayan, Philippines	
2	Win	2–0	Andrew Pal	TKO	2 (4)	Aug 16, 2007	Multi-Purpose Sports Complex, Alcoy, Philippines	
1	Win	1–0	Lobert Bayo	UD	4	Jun 3, 2007	Barangay Maguikay, Mandaue, Philippines	

== Exhibition boxing record ==
1 fight	1 win	0 losses
By knockout	1	0

No.	Result	Record	Opponent	Type	Round, time	Date	Location	Notes
1	Win	1–0	Billy Jack Sanchez	TKO	3 (3), 1:40	May 9, 2021	Glenford Fitness Boxing Gym, Taguig, Philippines	

== Titles in boxing ==
=== Major world titles ===
- IBF light flyweight champion (108 lbs)
- IBF flyweight champion (112 lbs)
- WBO bantamweight champion (118 lbs)

=== Interim world titles ===
- WBO interim light flyweight champion (108 lbs)
- IBF interim light flyweight champion (108 lbs)
- WBO interim bantamweight champion (118 lbs)

=== Regional/International titles ===
- PBF flyweight champion (112 lbs)
- WBO Asia Pacific light flyweight champion (108 lbs)
- WBO Global super bantamweight champion (122 lbs)

== Viewership ==
Date	Fight	Country	Network	Viewership (est.)	Source(s)
May 25, 2015	John Riel Casimero vs. Amnat Ruenroeng	China	CCTV-5	160,000,000–200,000,000	
	Total viewership			160,000,000–200,000,000	

== Awards and recognition ==
- 2024 1st Pacquiao-Elorde Awards Night
- 2023 Gabriel "Flash" Elorde Memorial Boxing Awards "Boxer of the Year" (for 2021)
- 2010 28th SAC-SMB Sportswriters Association of Cebu Sports Awards

== Controversy ==
=== Acts of lasciviousness ===
In 2022, Casimero was charged with acts of lasciviousness and sexual assault over the alleged molestation of a 17-year-old whom he had invited to his hotel room in Taguig in June 2021. Casimero's brother and trainer, Jayson, called the charges “fabricated”.

=== Threats against boxing personalities ===
In September 2024, DWAR Abante Radyo reported the dispute about John Riel and his brother Jayson during a Facebook live stream in Jayson's account Quadro Alas it’s my boy. Respondent exclaimed the following expletives and threatening remarks directed at sports commentator and social media personality, Pow Salud. Due to constant public arguments, heated atmosphere, and controversies surrounding the Casimero brothers. Salud has now officially stopped making articles, video contents, and coverage about Casimero.

In October 2024, following Casimero's victory against Saul Sanchez, international boxing judge Edward Ligas reported that Casimero and his entourage confronted him at Narita Airport in Japan, with Ligas alleging threatening behavior from Casimero's group over negative commentary he had made about the boxer, and accused Ligas of "spreading lies" and "attacking them". Ligas has indicated he is considering formal legal action against John Riel Casimero and his brother and trainer, Jayson, at the Games and Amusements Board (GAB) and the Japan Boxing Commission (JBC). Ligas expressed apprehension that a future encounter might escalate to physical confrontation.

=== Game-fixing claims ===
After Casimero's loss against Kyonosuke Kameda, his head trainer, cutman and brother, Jayson, suggested in a now-deleted social media live video that they had to lose as a part of a "bigger plan" to rebuild the boxer's career. The claim by Jayson Casimero made his supporters dismayed, as the brothers confidently encouraged the fans can bet that John Riel can finish the fight within 30 seconds, days before the fight. That claim made several fans to sell their properties and use tuition money to bet in favor of Casimero believing the fight is a "sure win", which lead at least two of them to file a complaint to the Games and Amusements Board.

In November 2025, GAB summoned the brothers on a hearing to explain their side, after the agency received multiple complaint emails requesting a formal investigation.

== Personal life ==
Casimero has two daughters from a previous relationship.

== Entertainment career ==
=== Internet ===
Casimero has a YouTube channel called Quadro alas tv vlog. Casimero also had a channel called Quadro Alas it's my boy but is now mainly managed by his brother and trainer, Jayson, since late 2021.

=== Battle of the YouTubers ===
On August 20, 2021, Vloggers TV announced that Casimero will be fighting in the first Battle of the YouTubers Season 2 celebrity boxing card. It was announced on December 22, 2021, that Casimero will be facing Jormiel Labador in the supporting bout scheduled on December 28, 2021, in Metro Manila, Philippines. However, Casimero was forced to pull out of the exhibition matched after the WBO prohibited Casimero from partaking in any event negotiations without the authorization of the sanctioning body and Probellum—the promoter of the card that was supposed to be topped by the postponed title defense against Paul Butler on December 11, 2021. Casimero was replaced by his brother and trainer, Jayson, in the exhibition bout and won. Vloggers TV eventually cut ties to John Riel and Jayson Casimero.

== See also ==
- List of world light-flyweight boxing champions
- List of world flyweight boxing champions
- List of world bantamweight boxing champions
- List of Filipino boxing world champions
- List of boxing triple champions

Sporting positions
World boxing titles
Vacant Title last held by Kermin Guardia	WBO light flyweight champion Interim title December 19, 2009 - July 24, 2010	Succeeded by Ramón García Hirales
New title	IBF light flyweight champion Interim title February 10, 2012 - July 20, 2012; Promoted	Vacant Title next held by Milan Melindo
Preceded by Ulises Solís; Stripped	IBF light flyweight champion July 20, 2012 - May 2, 2014; Stripped	Vacant Title next held by Javier Mendoza
Preceded by Amnat Ruenroeng	IBF flyweight champion May 25, 2016 - December 20, 2016; Vacated	Vacant Title next held by Donnie Nietes
Vacant Title last held by Zolani Tete	WBO bantamweight champion Interim title April 20 – November 30, 2019; Won world title	Vacant Title next held by Paul Butler
Preceded by Zolani Tete	WBO bantamweight champion November 30, 2019 - May 3, 2022; Stripped	Vacant Title next held by Paul Butler
