= Alex Sánchez (boxer) =

Puerto Rican world champion boxer (b. 1973)

Personal information
- Nickname: El Nene ("The Kid")
- Nationality: Puerto Rican
- Born: Alexander Sánchez Sepulveda; June 5, 1973 (age 53) Ponce, Puerto Rico
- Height: 5 ft 2 1/2 in (159 cm)
- Weight: Minimumweight; Light flyweight

Boxing career
- Reach: 64 in (163 cm)
- Stance: Orthodox

Boxing record
- Total fights: 40
- Wins: 31
- Win by KO: 21
- Losses: 8
- Draws: 1
- No contests: 0

Alexander Sánchez Sepúlveda (born June 5, 1973) is a former Puerto Rican professional boxer. He held the WBO minimumweight title from 1993 to 1997.

== Boxing career ==
Sánchez began his professional boxing career on October 4, 1991, knocking out Carlos Figueroa in round one at Mayagüez, Puerto Rico.

After one more win that year, he took 1992 off, but came back in 1993 to post nine wins in a row before facing Orlando Malone for the WBO's world Strawweight championship. On December 22 of that year, Sánchez became a world champion by knocking Malone out in the first round at San Juan, Puerto Rico.

He went on a European tour in 1994, retaining his title and winning a non-title bout in Spain, and retaining his title in Germany. By then, Sánchez was actively challenging Michael Carbajal into a fight. That fight, however, never came off.

In 1995, he retained his title twice, and won four non-title bouts. In 1996, he only had one fight, knocking out Jose Luis Velardez in round five.

In 1997, he started by suffering his first defeat, at the hands of Edgar Cardenas, by a decision in ten rounds. He then beat future world champion Victor Burgos by a decision in twelve to retain the title, in what marked the beginning of their trilogy of bouts. He closed the year by getting his long anticipated unification bout with WBC world champion Ricardo López, but he lost the title to López when López knocked him out in round five at Madison Square Garden.

Sánchez has been active only on and off since. In 2002, he and Burgos had their second meeting, and this time the result was a draw. But in 2003, after López had conquered the IBF world belt and retired, the IBF declared Sánchez and Burgos their official challengers for the world crown, and this time, Sánchez lost by a knockout in round 12 at Las Vegas.

Sánchez revealed that he had become a newborn Christian shortly before his next fight, an attempt at recovering the WBO world Strawweight championship, held this time by Ivan Calderón. On December 6, he lost to Calderón by a twelve-round unanimous decision at Bayamón.

On August 6, 2004, Sánchez, who had shortly before expressed to local newspapers that he hoped to become a world champion again, beat Roberto Gomez by an eight-round decision, as part of a San Juan undercard highlighted by José Miguel Cotto's win over former world champion Al Kotey.

Just over a month later, on September 11, he posted a first-round knockout over Arturo Velazquez, at the José Miguel Agrelot Coliseum, also in San Juan.

On January 29, 2005, Sánchez attempted to win the WBO world Jr. Flyweight title, but he lost to champion Nelson Dieppa of Vieques by an eleventh-round knockout. Puerto Rican boxing experts commented that the Sánchez-Dieppa fight should have been considered for "fight of the year" in Puerto Rico.

His next fight, once again for the WBO Jr. flyweight title that Hugo Cazares had taken from Dieppa, was held in Ponce on August 20 of that year. After suffering an eye injury, Sánchez lost the fight by an eighth-round technical knockout, announcing his retirement from professional boxing immediately after the bout.

At a moment in his career Alex Sánchez was trained by Félix Trinidad's father Felix Trinidad Sr.

Sánchez is now a boxing promoter in Puerto Rico.

== Professional Record ==
40 fights	31 wins	8 losses
By knockout	21	6
By decision	10	2
Draws	1	
No contests	0	

Res.	Record	Opponent	Type	Round, Time	Date	Location	Notes
Loss	31-8-1	(Philippines) Glenn Donaire	RTD	8 (12)	2011-12-09	Kissimmee Civic Center, Kissimmee, Florida, United States	For Interim WBC Latino Flyweight Title
Loss	31-7-1	(Puerto Rico) Nelson Dieppa	RTD	9 (12)	2008-02-23	Coliseo Héctor Solá Bezares, Caguas, Puerto Rico	For WBA Fedebol Light Flyweight Title
Loss	31-6-1	(Mexico) Hugo Fidel Cazares	RTD	8 (12)	2005-08-20	Auditorio Juan Pachín Vicéns, Ponce, Puerto Rico	For WBO Light Flyweight Title
Loss	31-5-1	(Puerto Rico) Nelson Dieppa	KO	11 (12)	2005-01-29	Coliseo Ruben Rodriguez, Bayamon, Puerto Rico	For WBO Light Flyweight Title
Win	31-4-1	(Mexico) Arturo Velazquez	KO	1 (8)	Sep 11, 2004	Coliseo Jose Miguel Agrelot, Hato Rey, Puerto Rico	
Win	30-4-1	(Mexico) Roberto Gomez	UD	8	2004-08-06	Coliseo Pedrín Zorrilla, Hato Rey, Puerto Rico	
Loss	29-4-1	(Puerto Rico) Ivan Calderon	UD	12	2003-12-06	Coliseo Ruben Rodriguez, Bayamon, Puerto Rico	For WBO Minimumweight Title
Loss	29-3-1	(Mexico) Jose Victor Burgos	TKO	12 (12)	2003-02-15	Caesars Palace, Las Vegas, Nevada, United States	For vacant IBF Light Flyweight Title
Draw	29-2-1	(Mexico) Jose Victor Burgos	SD	12	2002-05-11	Coliseo Roberto Clemente, San Juan, Puerto Rico	IBF Light Flyweight Title Eliminator
Win	29-2	(Puerto Rico) Jose Laureano	UD	6	2001-07-21	Coliseo Ruben Rodriguez, Bayamon, Puerto Rico	
Win	28-2	(Mexico) Jose Luis Velarde	KO	1 (8)	2001-05-20	San Juan, Puerto Rico	
Win	27-2	(Dominican Republic) Melquiades Ventura	KO	2 (6)	2001-04-19	Diamond Palace Hotel, Condado, Puerto Rico	
Win	26-2	(Mexico) Lorenzo Trejo	UD	10	1999-05-29	Coliseo Roberto Clemente, San Juan, Puerto Rico	
Loss	25-2	(Mexico) Ricardo Lopez	TKO	5 (12)	1997-08-23	Madison Square Garden, New York, New York, United States	Lost WBO & For WBC Minimumweight title
Win	25-1	(Mexico) Jose Victor Burgos	UD	12	1997-03-29	Hilton Hotel, Las Vegas, Nevada, United States	Retained WBO Minimumweight title
Loss	24-1	(Mexico) Edgar Cardenas	UD	10	1997-02-22	Hotel Caribe Hilton, Condado, Puerto Rico	
Win	24-0	(Mexico) Jose Luis Velarde	TKO	6 (10)	1996-05-04	Arrowhead Pond, Anaheim, California, United States	
Win	23-0	(Mexico) Pablo Tiznado	KO	1 (10)	1995-10-27	Ponce, Puerto Rico	
Win	22-0	(Mexico) Tomas Rivera	UD	12	1995-07-29	Freeman Coliseum, San Antonio, Texas, United States	Retained WBO Minimumweight title
Win	21-0	(Puerto Rico) Arturo Valdez	TKO	3 (10)	1995-06-15	Hotel Caribe Hilton, Condado, Puerto Rico	
Win	20-0	(Mexico) Fernando Martinez	KO	1 (10)	1995-05-04	Ponce, Puerto Rico	
Win	19-0	(Mexico) Ventura Mendivil	TKO	2 (10)	1995-02-27	Hotel Caribe Hilton, Condado, Puerto Rico	
Win	18-0	(Mexico) Rafael Orozco	UD	12	1995-01-28	MGM Grand, Las Vegas, Nevada, United States	Retained WBO Minimumweight title
Win	17-0	(Mexico) Pablo Tiznado	UD	10	1994-11-01	San Juan, Puerto Rico	
Win	16-0	(Mexico) Oscar Andrade	TKO	4 (12)	1994-09-10	Sporthalle, Alsterdorf, Hamburg, Germany	Retained WBO Minimumweight title
Win	15-0	(Dominican Republic) Carlos Juan Rodriguez	KO	1 (12)	1994-08-13	Coliseo Ruben Rodriguez, Bayamon, Puerto Rico	Retained WBO Minimumweight title
Win	14-0	(Mexico) Jose Rodriguez	TKO	3 (10)	1994-06-11	Zaragoza, Aragón, Spain	
Win	13-0	(Mexico) Arturo Mayan	TKO	1 (12)	1994-01-07	Casino de Mallorca, Palma de Mallorca, Islas Baleares, Spain	Retained WBO Minimumweight title
Win	12-0	(United States) Orlando Malone	TKO	1 (12)	1993-12-22	Hotel Caribe Hilton, Condado, Puerto Rico	Won vacant WBO Minimumweight title
Win	11-0	(Spain) Jose Juarez	KO	4 (8)	1993-10-29	Zaragoza, Aragón, Spain	
Win	10-0	(United States) Andres Carrasco	KO	1 (6)	1993-10-15	Yabucoa, Puerto Rico	
Win	9-0	(Mexico) Eduardo Vallejo	TKO	1 (8)	1993-10-01	Camuy, Puerto Rico	
Win	8-0	(Puerto Rico) Miguel Santos	UD	8	1993-07-17	San Juan, Puerto Rico	
Win	7-0	(Spain) Jose Ramon Bartolome	UD	4	1993-07-03	La Linea, Puerto Rico	
Win	6-0	(Puerto Rico) Jose Hernandez	KO	1 (6)	1993-06-19	San Juan, Puerto Rico	
Win	5-0	(Puerto Rico) Kenny Berrios	TKO	4 (6)	1993-05-15	Hotel Caribe Hilton, Condado, Puerto Rico	
Win	4-0	(Puerto Rico) Carlos Figueroa	KO	1 (6)	1993-03-24	Hotel Caribe Hilton, Condado, Puerto Rico	
Win	3-0	(Puerto Rico) Jose Hernandez	TKO	4 (6)	1993-01-16	Isla Verde, Puerto Rico	
Win	2-0	(Puerto Rico) Alfredo Rivera	UD	4	1991-11-04	San Juan, Puerto Rico	
Win	1-0	(Puerto Rico) Carlos Figueroa	TKO	1 (4)	1991-10-04	Mayaguez, Puerto Rico	Professional debut

== Legacy ==
He is recognized at Ponce's Parque de los Ponceños Ilustres in the area of sports.

== See also ==
- List of Puerto Ricans
- List of Puerto Rican boxing world champions

Achievements
Vacant Title last held by Paul Weir	WBO minimumweight champion December 22, 1993 - August 23, 1997	Succeeded by Ricardo Lopez
