= Ulises Solís =

Mexican boxer (born 1981)

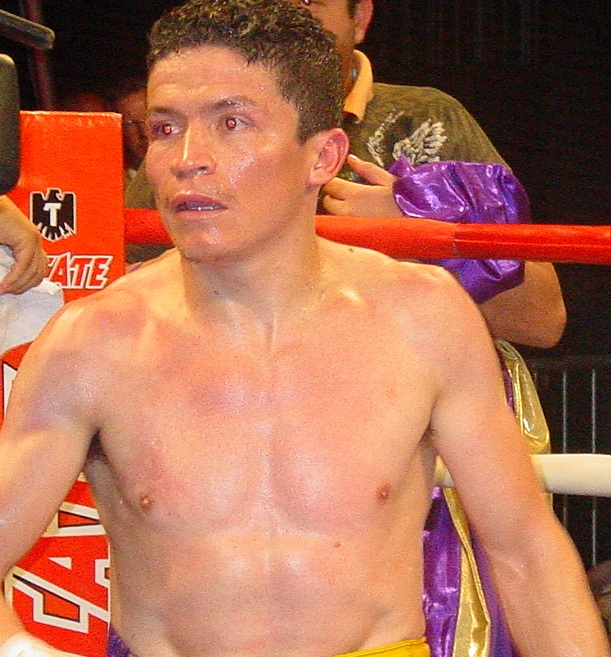

Personal information
- Nickname: Archi
- Born: José Ulises Solís Pérez; 28 August 1981 (age 45) Guadalajara, Jalisco, Mexico
- Height: 5 ft 3 in (160 cm)
- Weight: Light flyweight; Flyweight

Boxing career
- Reach: 65 in (165 cm)
- Stance: Orthodox

Boxing record
- Total fights: 41
- Wins: 35
- Win by KO: 22
- Losses: 3
- Draws: 3

José Ulises Solís Pérez (born 28 August 1981) is a Mexican former professional boxer who competed from 2000 to 2013. He held the IBF junior flyweight title twice in his career from 2006 to 2009 and from 2011 to 2012. He is the brother of former boxer Jorge Solís.

== Professional career ==
In April 2000, Solis won his professional debut against Adolfo Rosillo. He compiled a record of 18–0–1, which included a win over future champion Edgar Sosa.

=== WBO Light Flyweight Championship ===
On July 30, 2004, Solis challenged WBO Light Flyweight champion Nelson Dieppa but lost the twelve round bout.

=== IBF Light Flyweight Championship ===
On January 7, 2006, Solís defeated Will Grigsby for the IBF world championship title, by a unanimous decision (118–110, 117–111, 116–112). He defended his title against former champion Eric Ortiz and Omar Salado.

On January 25, 2008, Solis faced Grigsby in a rematch and defeated him once again by stopping him in the 8th round. On May 19, 2007, Solis defeated former WBC world champion José Antonio Aguirre via an 8th round technical knock out. On August 4, 2007, he defeated Filipino future champion Rodel Mayol (23–1–0) by technical knockout. On December 15, 2007, Solis defended his title against Filipino veteran boxer Bert Batawang.

Solís was scheduled to face Glenn Donaire on May 17, 2008, however, he was forced to back out after he came down with a serious case of pneumonia. The fight was rescheduled for July 12 at the Palenque De La Expo in Hermosillo, Sonora, Mexico. at Hermosillo, Monterrey, Mexico, 12 rounds. Solis retained the title by scoring a shutout on all 3 judges cards (by the scores of 120-108 twice and 120–117).

On December 2, 2008, Solis defeated Nicaraguan Nerys Espinoza by unanimous decision. In total, he defended his IBF title eight times.

Solis lost the IBF light-flyweight title after he was knocked out in the 11th round of his title bout vs Brian Viloria. On March 27, 2010, Solis defeated Bert Batawang for a second time in an IBF light flyweight title eliminator bout after Batawang retired in the 6th round. Following that victory, Solis defeated former champion Eric Ortiz by a 10-round unanimous decision at the Grand Sierra Resort in Reno, NV commemorating the 100th anniversary of The Johnson-Jeffries Fight. During this time, Viloria lost the IBF title by knock out to Carlos Tamara, who in turn, lost the title by split decision to Luis Alberto Lazarte.

=== Regaining the IBF Light Flyweight Championship ===
On December 18, 2010, Solis fought IBF light flyweight champion Luis Alberto Lazarte to a controversial majority draw in Argentina. Solis outboxed Lazarte for the first half of the bout while a frustrated Lazarte repeatedly fouled Solis with illegal punches to the back of the head and below the belt, at one point, even going so far as to bite the challenger. The referee, Max Parker, who had trouble communicating with the fighters in Spanish, warned Lazarte throughout the bout, however, he ultimately only deducted two points from the defending champion. The final scores were 117–109 in favor of Solis while the other two judges controversially scored it 113-113 even. Solis' promoter, Fernando Beltran, is expected to file a formal protest to the IBF on his behalf.

On April 30, 2011, Solis faced Lazarte in a rematch of their controversial bout. Solis defeated Lazarte by a 12-round split decision in Argentina to claim the IBF light flyweight title.

== Professional boxing record ==
| 41 fights | 35 wins | 3 losses |
|---|---|---|
| By knockout | 22 | 2 |
| By decision | 13 | 1 |
| Draws | 3 | |

| No. | Result | Record | Opponent | Type | Round, time | Date | Location | Notes |
|---|---|---|---|---|---|---|---|---|
| 41 | Loss | 35–3–3 | Edgar Sosa | KO | 2 (12), 2:12 | 9 Mar 2013 | Gimnasio Usos Múltiples UdeG, Guadalajara, Mexico | For WBC Silver flyweight title |
| 40 | Win | 35–2–3 | Jesus Iribe | KO | 7 (10) | 3 Nov 2012 | Centro de Usos Multiples, Hermosillo, Mexico | |
| 39 | Win | 34–2–3 | Jether Oliva | UD | 12 | 27 Aug 2011 | Auditorio Benito Juarez, Guadalajara, Mexico | Retained IBF light-flyweight title |
| 38 | Win | 33–2–3 | Luis Alberto Lazarte | SD | 12 | 30 Apr 2011 | Club Once Unidos, Mar del Plata, Argentina | Won IBF light-flyweight title |
| 37 | Draw | 32–2–3 | Luis Alberto Lazarte | MD | 12 | 18 Dec 2010 | Club Once Unidos, Mar del Plata, Argentina | For IBF light-flyweight title |
| 36 | Win | 32–2–2 | Luis Carlos Leon | UD | 10 | 15 Sep 2010 | El Palenque de la Feria, Tepic, Mexico | |
| 35 | Win | 31–2–2 | Eric Ortiz | UD | 10 | 3 Jul 2010 | Grand Sierra Resort, Reno, Nevada, U.S. | |
| 34 | Win | 30–2–2 | Bert Batawang | RTD | 6 (12), 3:00 | 27 Mar 2010 | Explanada de Pueblo Antiguo, Ensenada, Mexico | |
| 33 | Win | 29–2–2 | Dirceu Cabarca | UD | 8 | 15 Sep 2009 | Plaza de Toros, Cancún, Mexico | |
| 32 | Loss | 28–2–2 | Brian Viloria | KO | 11 (12), 2:56 | 19 Apr 2009 | Araneta Coliseum, Quezon City, Philippines | Lost IBF light-flyweight title |
| 31 | Win | 28–1–2 | Nerys Espinoza | UD | 12 | 2 Nov 2008 | La Feria de San Marcos, Aguascalientes, Mexico | Retained IBF light-flyweight title |
| 30 | Win | 27–1–2 | Glenn Donaire | UD | 12 | 12 Jul 2008 | Palenque de la Expo Gan, Hermosillo, Mexico | Retained IBF light-flyweight title |
| 29 | Win | 26–1–2 | Bert Batawang | TKO | 9 (12), 2:33 | 15 Dec 2007 | Auditorio Benito Juarez, Guadalajara, Mexico | Retained IBF light-flyweight title |
| 28 | Win | 25–1–2 | Rodel Mayol | TKO | 8 (12), 1:13 | 4 Aug 2007 | Allstate Arena, Rosemont, Illinois, U.S. | Retained IBF light-flyweight title |
| 27 | Win | 24–1–2 | José Antonio Aguirre | TKO | 9 (12), 0:30 | 19 May 2007 | Auditorio Benito Juarez, Guadalajara, Mexico | Retained IBF light-flyweight title |
| 26 | Win | 23–1–2 | Will Grigsby | RTD | 8 (12), 3:00 | 25 Jan 2007 | The Orleans, Paradise, Nevada, U.S. | Retained IBF light-flyweight title |
| 25 | Draw | 22–1–2 | Omar Salado | MD | 12 | 4 Aug 2006 | Caliente Hipódromo, Tijuana, Mexico | Retained IBF light-flyweight title |
| 24 | Win | 22–1–1 | Eric Ortiz | TKO | 9 (12), 2:40 | 25 Mar 2006 | El Domo del Code Jalisco, Guadalajara, Mexico | Retained IBF light-flyweight title |
| 23 | Win | 21–1–1 | Will Grigsby | UD | 12 | 7 Jan 2006 | Madison Square Garden, New York City, New York, U.S. | Won IBF light-flyweight title |
| 22 | Win | 20–1–1 | Carlos Fajardo | TKO | 8 (12), 1:49 | 17 Jun 2005 | Arena Coliseo, Guadalajara, Mexico | |
| 21 | Win | 19–1–1 | Jesus Martinez | TKO | 5 (10), 1:05 | 25 Feb 2005 | Arena Coliseo, Guadalajara, Mexico | |
| 20 | Loss | 18–1–1 | Nelson Dieppa | MD | 12 | 30 Jul 2004 | Freedom Hall, Louisville, Kentucky, U.S. | For WBO light-flyweight title |
| 19 | Win | 18–0–1 | Adalberto Davila | KO | 1 (12) | 25 Jun 2004 | Arena Coliseo, Guadalajara, Mexico | Retained Mexican light-flyweight title |
| 18 | Win | 17–0–1 | Gabriel Munoz | KO | 3 (12), 1:13 | 6 Mar 2004 | Casino Real, Mexico City, Mexico | Retained Mexican light-flyweight title |
| 17 | Win | 16–0–1 | Lee Sandoval | TKO | 8 (12) | 24 Oct 2003 | Miccosukee Resort & Gaming, Miami, Florida, U.S. | Won WBA Fedecentro light-flyweight title |
| 16 | Win | 15–0–1 | Édgar Sosa | MD | 12 | 13 Sep 2003 | Casino Real, Mexico City, Mexico | Retained Mexican light-flyweight title |
| 15 | Win | 14–0–1 | Juan Alfonso Keb Baas | TKO | 9 (12) | 9 Aug 2003 | Salon La Maraka, Mexico City, Mexico | Won vacant Mexican light-flyweight title |
| 14 | Win | 13–0–1 | Omar Soto | SD | 10 | 21 Sep 2002 | Arena México, Mexico City, Mexico | |
| 13 | Win | 12–0–1 | Valentin Leon | TKO | 6 (10) | 21 Jul 2002 | Tepic, Mexico | |
| 12 | Win | 11–0–1 | Fred Heberto Valdez | KO | 4 (8) | 23 Mar 2002 | Mexico City, Mexico | |
| 11 | Win | 10–0–1 | Cesar Gonzalez | TKO | 2 (8) | 6 Oct 2001 | Mexico City, Mexico | |
| 10 | Win | 9–0–1 | Jose de Jesus Robles | TKO | 3 (?) | 15 Sep 2001 | Tepic, Mexico | |
| 9 | Win | 8–0–1 | Juan Manuel Armendariz | TKO | 3 (?) | 20 Jul 2001 | Guadalajara, Mexico | |
| 8 | Win | 7–0–1 | Édgar Sosa | SD | 6 | 5 May 2001 | Arena México, Mexico City, Mexico | |
| 7 | Win | 6–0–1 | Jaime Parga | PTS | 8 | 9 Feb 2001 | Mexico | |
| 6 | Win | 5–0–1 | Ricardo Astorga | PTS | 8 | 15 Dec 2000 | Mexico | |
| 5 | Draw | 4–0–1 | Jaime Parga | PTS | 8 | 2 Nov 2000 | Guadalajara, Mexico | |
| 4 | Win | 4–0 | Juan Rodriguez | KO | 1 (?) | 8 Sep 2000 | Gimnasio Municipal, Ciudad Obregón, Mexico | |
| 3 | Win | 3–0 | Juan Rodriguez | KO | 7 (?) | 16 Jun 2000 | Mexico City, Mexico | |
| 2 | Win | 2–0 | Isidro Pacheco | TKO | 3 (?) | 19 May 2000 | Guadalajara, Mexico | |
| 1 | Win | 1–0 | Adolfo Rosillo | TKO | 1 (?) | 7 Apr 2000 | Mexico | |

== Altercation with Canelo Álvarez and layoff ==
In October 2011, he got into a street fight against fellow Mexican boxer and four-division champion Canelo Álvarez resulting in a broken jaw. He planned to press charges against Álvarez but ultimately settled an agreement four years after the incident. Solís was forced to vacate his IBF light flyweight title and had a long lay off from the sport after that.

== See also ==
- List of male boxers
- Notable boxing families
- List of Mexican boxing world champions
- List of world light-flyweight boxing champions

Sporting positions
Regional boxing titles
| Vacant Title last held by Edgar Cárdenas | Mexican light-flyweight champion August 9, 2003 – January 7, 2006; Won world title | Vacant Title next held by Abel Ochoa |
| New title | WBA Fedecentro light-flyweight champion October 24, 2003 – January 7, 2006; Won world title | Vacant |
World boxing titles
| Preceded by Will Grigsby | IBF light-flyweight champion January 7, 2006 – April 19, 2009 | Succeeded by Brian Viloria |
| Preceded by Luis Alberto Lazarte | IBF light-flyweight champion April 30, 2011 – July 20, 2012; Stripped | Succeeded by John Riel Casimero promoted from interim champion |
