= Eric Ortiz =

Mexican boxer

Personal information
- Born: Eric Ortiz Aparicio; May 19, 1977 (age 49) Mexico City, Mexico
- Height: 5 ft 2 in (157 cm)
- Weight: Light flyweight; Flyweight; Super flyweight

Boxing career
- Reach: 68 in (173 cm)
- Stance: Orthodox

Boxing record
- Total fights: 48
- Wins: 32
- Win by KO: 21
- Losses: 13
- Draws: 3

Eric Ortiz Aparicio (born 19 May 1977 in Mexico City) is a Mexican professional boxer that competes in the light flyweight (108 lb) division.

== Pro career ==
Ortiz turned pro in 1996 and in 2005 captured the vacant WBC light flyweight title with a TKO win over José Antonio Aguirre. He lost the belt in his first defense to Brian Viloria. The following year he challenged IBF light flyweight title holder Ulises Solís but lost via TKO. After a couple of wins, he then lost in an eliminator to Z Gorres in 2007.

== Professional boxing record ==
48 fights	32 wins	13 losses
By knockout	21	10
By decision	11	2
By disqualification	0	1
Draws	3	

No.	Result	Record	Opponent	Type	Round, time	Date	Location	Notes
48	Loss	32–13–3	Danny Flores	DQ	5 (10)	2012-05-04	Polifuncional, Kanasín, Mexico	
47	Loss	32–12–3	Edgar Jimenez	KO	4 (12)	2011-07-23	Jose Cuervo Salon, Polanco, Mexico	For vacant Mexican flyweight title
46	Loss	32–11–3	Ulises Solís	UD	10 (10)	2010-07-03	Grand Sierra Resort, Reno, Nevada, U.S.	
45	Loss	32–10–3	Luis Concepción	TKO	4 (12)	2010-04-22	Roberto Durán Arena, Panama City, Panama	For interim WBA flyweight title
44	Win	32–9–3	Gabriel Lopez	TKO	2 (8)	2010-02-20	Discoteca El Alebrije, Acapulco, Mexico	
43	Loss	31–9–3	Julio César Miranda	KO	1 (12)	2009-07-11	Palenque de Gallos, Tuxtla Gutiérrez, Mexico	
42	Draw	31–8–3	Gilberto Keb Baas	SD	6 (6)	2009-06-06	Xcaret Park, Cancún, Mexico	
41	Win	31–8–2	Valentin Leon	TKO	5 (10)	2009-02-28	Polideportivo Centenario, Los Mochis, Mexico	
40	Win	30–8–2	Juan Alfonso Keb Baas	TKO	4 (8)	2008-11-29	Salon Rojo, Toluca, Mexico	
39	Win	29–8–2	Oscar Ibarra	UD	10 (10)	2008-09-15	Arena México, Mexico City, Mexico	
38	Draw	28–8–2	Adrián Hernández	TD	5 (12)	2008-06-14	Palacio de los Deportes, Mexico City, Mexico	For NABF flyweight title
37	Win	28–8–1	Antonio Perez	KO	? (10)	2008-02-16	Palenque Recinto Ferial, Atlixco, Mexico	
36	Loss	27–8–1	Víctor Zaleta	TKO	6 (10)	2007-09-29	Gimnasio Rodrigo M. Quevedo, Chihuahua, Mexico	
35	Loss	27–7–1	Z Gorres	TKO	8 (12)	2007-08-11	ARCO Arena, Sacramento, California, U.S.	For vacant IBF Inter-Continental super-flyweight title
34	Win	27–6–1	Jonathan Pérez	TKO	11 (12)	2007-06-01	Miccosukee Resort & Gaming, Miami, Florida, U.S.	Won vacant WBO Latino super-flyweight title
33	Win	26–6–1	Benjamin Garcia	UD	10 (10)	2006-09-29	Camp Pendleton, Oceanside, California, U.S.	
32	Loss	25–6–1	Ulises Solís	TKO	9 (12)	2006-03-25	El Domo del Code Jalisco, Guadalajara, Mexico	For IBF light-flyweight title
31	Loss	25–5–1	Brian Viloria	KO	1 (12)	10 Sep 2005	Staples Center, Los Angeles, California, U.S.	Lost WBC light-flyweight title
30	Win	25–4–1	José Antonio Aguirre	TKO	7 (12)	2005-03-11	Restaurante Arroyo, Mexico City, Mexico	Won vacant WBC light-flyweight title
29	Win	24–4–1	Emilio Ahuelican	UD	8 (8)	2004-12-17	Arena Coliseo, Guadalajara, Mexico	
28	Win	23–4–1	Wyndel Janiola	TD	5 (12)	2004-09-04	Plaza de Toros, Tijuana, Mexico	
27	Loss	22–4–1	Luis Valdez	TKO	4 (10)	2004-03-27	Auditorio Municipal, Tijuana, Mexico	
26	Win	22–3–1	Alejo Galindo	KO	2 (12)	2003-07-31	Salon La Maraka, Mexico City, Mexico	Retained WBC FECARBOX light-flyweight title
25	Win	21–3–1	Paulino Villalobos	SD	12 (12)	2002-12-11	Foro Las Americas, Mexico City, Mexico	Retained WBC FECARBOX light-flyweight title
24	Win	20–3–1	Fred Heberto Valdez	TKO	5 (12)	2002-04-17	Salon 21, Mexico City, U.S.	Retained WBC FECARBOX light-flyweight title
23	Win	19–3–1	Pedro Gutiérrez	TKO	9 (?)	2002-01-26	Tuxtla Gutiérrez, Mexico	
22	Win	18–3–1	Indalecio Valenzuela	KO	1 (12)	2001-07-24	Mexico City, Mexico	Retained WBC FECARBOX light-flyweight title
21	Win	17–3–1	Rafael Orozco	KO	5 (12)	2001-01-05	Mexico City, Mexico	Retained WBC FECARBOX light-flyweight title
20	Win	16–3–1	Emilio Palacios	KO	4 (12)	2000-10-06	Mexico City, Mexico	Retained WBC FECARBOX light-flyweight title
19	Win	15–3–1	Pedro Gutiérrez	TKO	8 (12)	2000-07-07	Palenque de Gallos, Villahermosa, Mexico	Retained WBC FECARBOX light-flyweight title
18	Win	14–3–1	Alfonso Lugo	TKO	4 (10)	2000-06-17	Arena México, Mexico City, Mexico	
17	Win	13–3–1	Alfredo Virgen	TKO	11 (12)	1999-11-15	La Boom Discoteque, Mexico City, Mexico	Won vacant WBC FECARBOX light-flyweight title
16	Win	12–3–1	Ramon Euroza	PTS	10 (10)	1999-07-31	Mexico City, Mexico	
15	Win	11–3–1	Job Solano	TKO	6 (10)	1999-06-12	Arena Coliseo, Mexico City, Mexico	
14	Win	10–3–1	Valerio Sanchez	MD	10 (10)	1999-04-10	Arena Coliseo, Mexico City, Mexico	
13	Win	9–3–1	Guillermo Garcia	UD	10 (10)	1998-11-07	Arena México, Mexico City, Mexico	
12	Win	8–3–1	Guillermo Garcia	PTS	6 (6)	1998-09-12	Mexico City, Mexico	
11	Win	7–3–1	Carlos Macias	TKO	2 (?)	1998-08-15	Ciudad Nezahualcóyotl, Mexico	
10	Win	6–3–1	Jose Manuel Perez	KO	4 (?)	1998-03-04	Arena Coliseo, Mexico City, Mexico	
9	Win	5–3–1	Alejandro Garcia	TKO	6 (?)	1997-12-13	Mexico City, Mexico	
8	Win	4–3–1	Victor Manuel Rojas	TKO	1 (?)	1997-10-11	Mexico City, Mexico	
7	Loss	3–3–1	Rafael Chavez	TKO	3 (?)	1997-05-31	Arena Coliseo, Mexico City, Mexico	
6	Win	3–2–1	Tomas Reyes	UD	6 (6)	1997-03-15	Arena Coliseo, Mexico City, Mexico	
5	Win	2–2–1	Raul Cortez	KO	2 (?)	1997-02-08	Mexico City, Mexico	
4	Draw	1–2–1	Carlos Garcia	PTS	4 (4)	1996-11-06	Mexico City, Mexico	
3	Loss	1–2	Rodrigo Garcia	TKO	2 (?)	1996-09-04	Mexico	
2	Loss	1–1	Victor Miranda	PTS	4 (4)	1996-05-08	Mexico City, Mexico	
1	Win	1–0	Abraham Pelaez	PTS	4 (4)	1996-02-21	Mexico City, Mexico	

== See also ==
- List of Mexican boxing world champions
- List of world light-flyweight boxing champions

Sporting positions
Regional boxing titles
Vacant Title last held by José Laureano	WBC FECARBOX light-flyweight Champion; November 15, 1999 – 2003; Vacated	Vacant Title next held by Francisco Rosas
Vacant Title last held by Cecilio Santos	WBO Latino super-flyweight champion June 1, 2007 – 2010; Vacated	Vacant Title next held by Juan Mercedes
World boxing titles
Vacant Title last held by Jorge Arce	WBC light-flyweight champion March 11, 2005 – September 10, 2005	Succeeded by Brian Viloria
