= Carlos Tamara =

Colombian boxer (born 1983)

Personal information
- Nickname: El Olimpico
- Nationality: Colombian
- Born: Carlos José Tamara Paternina; 15 March 1983 (age 43) Sincelejo, Colombia
- Height: 5 ft 5 in (165 cm)
- Weight: Light flyweight; Flyweight

Boxing career
- Reach: 66 in (168 cm)
- Stance: Orthodox

Boxing record
- Total fights: 33
- Wins: 24
- Win by KO: 17
- Losses: 8
- Draws: 1
Medal record
Men's Boxing
Representing Colombia
Pan American Games
Silver medal – second place	2003 Santo Domingo	Light Flyweight

Carlos José Tamara Paternina (born 15 March 1983) is a Colombian former professional boxer who competed from 2005 to 2013. He held the IBF light flyweight title in 2010 and previously challenged for the WBO flyweight title in 2008. As an amateur, he competed at the 2004 Summer Olympics and won a silver medal at the 2003 Pan American Games.

== Amateur career ==
=== Olympic results ===
Tamara competed for Colombia at the 2004 Olympic Games in Athens. He was defeated in the second round by Italy's Alfonso Pinto in the Light Flyweight (48 kg) division. Results were:

- Defeated Redouane Bouchtouk (Morocco) 48–0
- Lost to Alfonso Pinto (Italy) 35–49

== Professional career ==
=== World Title ===
Carlos defeated Brian Viloria with 1:45 left in the 12th and final on 23 January 2010, to win the IBF light-flyweight title. He would lose the title in his next fight against Argentine Luis Alberto Lazarte.

== Professional boxing record ==
33 fights	24 wins	8 losses
By knockout	17	1
By decision	7	7
Draws	1	

No.	Result	Record	Opponent	Type	Round, time	Date	Location	Notes
33	Win	24–8–1	Adrian Dimas Garzon	UD	10 (10)	2013-10-19	Coliseo Miguel Grau, Callao, Peru	
32	Loss	23–8–1	Hernán Márquez	UD	12 (12)	2013-06-01	Estadio Sonora, Hermosillo, Mexico	
31	Win	23–7–1	Jose Humberto Caraballo	KO	3 (8)	2012-12-13	Barrio Tairona, Barranquilla, Colombia	
30	Loss	22–7–1	Ricardo Nunez	TKO	6 (12)	2012-04-26	Roberto Durán Arena, Panama City, Panama	
29	Draw	22–6–1	Jesús Jiménez	SD	12 (12)	2011-09-24	Centro de Convenciones, Cozumel, Mexico	For vacant IBF Latino flyweight title
28	Win	22–6	Jorge Ballesteros	KO	2 (6)	2011-04-08	Centro Recreacional Las Vegas, Barranquilla, Colombia	
27	Loss	21–6	Milan Melindo	UD	10 (10)	2010-11-27	Waterfront Hotel & Casino, Cebu City, Philippines	
26	Loss	21–5	Luis Alberto Lazarte	SD	12 (12)	2010-05-29	Club Once Unidos, Mar del Plata, Argentina	Lost IBF light-flyweight title
25	Win	21–4	Brian Viloria	TKO	12 (12)	2010-01-23	Cuneta Astrodome, Pasay City, Philippines	Won IBF light-flyweight title
24	Win	20–4	Alfonso De la Hoz	UD	6 (6)	2009-10-18	Cancha del barrio Nueva Colombia, Barranquilla, Colombia	
23	Win	19–4	Nelson Cantero	TKO	4 (8)	2009-08-21	Centro Recreacional Las Vegas, Barranquilla, Colombia	
22	Win	18–4	Juan Esquer	UD	12 (12)	2008-06-20	Miccosukee Resort & Gaming, Miami, Florida, U.S.	Won vacant WBA Fedecentro light-flyweight title
21	Loss	17–4	Omar Narváez	UD	12 (12)	2008-01-25	Nuevo Palacio Aurinegro, Puerto Madryn, Argentina	For WBO flyweight title
20	Win	17–3	Alejandro Hernández	UD	12 (12)	2007-12-07	Miccosukee Resort & Gaming, Miami, Florida, U.S.	Won WBO Latino flyweight title
19	Win	16–3	Jose Mena	TKO	5 (6)	2007-10-27	Centro Recreativo del Educador, Penonome, Panama	Won vacant WBC Latino flyweight title
18	Win	15–3	Luis Roger	TKO	2 (6)	2007-06-01	Miccosukee Resort & Gaming, Miami, Florida, U.S.	
17	Loss	14–3	Rayonta Whitfield	UD	12 (12)	2007-04-13	Fitzgerald's Casino & Hotel, Tunica, Mississippi, U.S.	For vacant NABO flyweight title
16	Win	14–2	Over Bolanos	KO	3 (6)	2007-03-16	Centro Recreacional Las Vegas, Barranquilla, Colombia	
15	Win	13–2	Luis Salgado	KO	2 (10)	2007-01-27	Centro de Cultura Física, Barranquilla, Colombia	
14	Loss	12–2	Giovani Segura	UD	12 (12)	2006-11-03	Palo Duro Golf Club, Nogales, Arizona, U.S.	
13	Loss	12–1	Gerardo Verde Moreno	SD	12 (12)	2006-09-22	Mile High Events Center, Commerce City, Colorado, U.S.	For vacant WBC & WBO Latino light-flyweight titles
12	Win	12–0	Alfonso De la Hoz	UD	12 (12)	2006-06-16	Centro Recreacional Las Vegas, Barranquilla, Colombia	Won vacant WBC Latino flyweight title
11	Win	11–0	Miguel Del Valle	UD	6 (6)	2006-03-24	Miccosukee Resort & Gaming, Miami, Florida, U.S.	
10	Win	10–0	Israel Crespo	RTD	4 (6)	2006-03-10	Civic Center, Kissimmee, Florida, U.S.	
9	Win	9–0	Alfredo Ochoa	KO	4 (6)	2006-02-11	Barranquilla, Colombia	
8	Win	8–0	Carlos Guerrero	KO	2 (6)	2005-11-18	Polideportivo Municipio, Puerto Colombia, Colombia	
7	Win	7–0	Luis Bolano	TKO	1 (6)	2005-10-21	Club Los Bucaros, Barranquilla, Colombia	
6	Win	6–0	Alfredo Ochoa	KO	5 (6)	2005-09-24	Barranquilla, Colombia	
5	Win	5–0	Victor Peralta	KO	4 (4)	2005-07-15	Centro Recreacional Las Vegas, Barranquilla, Colombia	
4	Win	4–0	Victor Orozco	KO	2 (4)	2005-07-01	Coliseo Elias Chegwin, Barranquilla, Colombia	
3	Win	3–0	Alfredo Ochoa	PTS	4 (4)	2005-06-11	Coliseo Elias Chegwin, Barranquilla, Colombia	
2	Win	2–0	Ivan Gallardo	TKO	1 (4)	2005-04-29	Figali Convention Center, Fort Amador, Panama	
1	Win	1–0	Harold Rodriguez	KO	2 (4)	2005-04-08	Barranquilla, Colombia	

== See also ==
- List of world light-flyweight boxing champions

Sporting positions
Regional boxing titles
Vacant Title last held by José López	WBC Latino flyweight champion 16 June 2006 – 2006; Vacated	Vacant Title next held by José López
Vacant Title last held by José López	WBC Latino flyweight champion 27 October 2007 – 2008; Vacated	Vacant Title next held by Luis Alberto Lazarte
Preceded by Alejandro Hernández	WBO Latino flyweight champion 7 December 2007 – 2008; Vacated	Vacant Title next held by Jesús Jiménez
Vacant Title last held by Román González	WBA Fedecentro light-flyweight champion 20 June 2008 – 2008; Vacated	Vacant Title next held by Eliecer Quezada
Preceded by Juan Esquer	WBC Latino light-flyweight champion 20 June 2008 – 2008; Vacated	Vacant Title next held by Abel Ochoa
Preceded by Juan Esquer	WBO Latino light-flyweight champion 20 June 2008 – 2008; Vacated	Vacant Title next held by Erik Ramirez
World boxing titles
Preceded by Brian Viloria	IBF light-flyweight champion 23 January 2010 – 29 May 2010	Succeeded by Luis Alberto Lazarte
