= List of world light-flyweight boxing champions =

This is a list of world light-flyweight boxing champions (also known as junior-flyweight), as recognized by the four major sanctioning organizations in boxing:

- The World Boxing Association (WBA), established in 1921 as the National Boxing Association (NBA). The WBA often recognize up to two world champions in a given weight class; Super champion and Regular champion.
- The World Boxing Council (WBC), established in 1963.
- The International Boxing Federation (IBF), established in 1983.
- The World Boxing Organization (WBO), established in 1988.

== IBF ==
Reign Began	Reign Ended	Champion	Recognition
Title inaugurated
1983-12-10	1986-07-18-Vacated	(Philippines) Dodie Boy Peñalosa	IBF
1986-12-07	1988-11-04	(South Korea) Jum-hwan Choi	IBF
1988-11-04	1989-05-02	(Philippines) Tacy Macalos	IBF
1989-05-02	1990-07-29	(Thailand) Muangchai Kittikasem	IBF
1990-07-29	1994-02-19	(United States) Michael Carbajal	IBF
1994-02-19	1995-07-15	(Mexico) Humberto González	IBF
1995-07-15	1995-11-12-Vacated	(Thailand) Saman Sorjaturong	IBF
1996-03-16	1997-01-18	(United States) Michael Carbajal	IBF
1997-01-18	1998-04-30-Vacated	(Colombia) Mauricio Pastrana	IBF
1998-12-18	1999-10-02	(United States) Will Grigsby	IBF
1999-10-02	2002-11-27-Retired	(Mexico) Ricardo López	IBF
2003-02-15	2005-05-14	(Mexico) Víctor Burgos	IBF
2005-05-14	2006-01-07	(United States) Will Grigsby	IBF
2006-01-07	2009-04-19	(Mexico) Ulises Solís	IBF
2009-04-19	2010-01-23	(United States) Brian Viloria	IBF
2010-01-23	2010-05-29	(Colombia) Carlos Tamara	IBF
2010-05-29	2011-04-30	(Argentina) Luis Alberto Lazarte	IBF
2011-04-30	2012-07-19-Stripped	(Mexico) Ulises Solís	IBF
2012-07-19	2014-05-02-Stripped	(Philippines) John Riel Casimero	IBF
2014-09-20	2015-29-12	(Mexico) Javier Mendoza	IBF
2015-29-12	2017-22-05	(Japan) Akira Yaegashi	IBF
2017-05-22	2017-12-31	(Philippines) Milan Melindo	IBF
2017-12-31	2018-05-20	(Japan) Ryoichi Taguchi	IBF
2018-05-20	2018-07-25-Vacated	(South Africa) Hekkie Budler	IBF
2018-10-29	2022-03-22-Vacated	(Nicaragua) Felix Alvarado	IBF
2022-09-13	2024-10-12	(South Africa) Sivenathi Nontshinga	IBF
2024-10-12	2025-04-10-Vacated	(Japan) Masamichi Yabuki	IBF
2025-06-19	Present	(Thailand) Thanongsak Simsri	IBF

== WBC ==
Reign Began	Reign Ended	Champion	Recognition
Title inaugurated
1975-04-04	1975-08-29-Stripped	(Italy) Franco Udella	WBC
1975-09-13	1978-02-19	(Venezuela) Luis Estaba	WBC
1978-02-19	1978-05-06	(Mexico) Freddy Castillo	WBC
1978-05-06	1978-09-30	(Thailand) Netrnoi Sor Vorasingh	WBC
1978-09-30	1980-01-03	(South Korea) Sung-jun Kim	WBC
1980-01-03	1980-03-24	(Japan) Shigeo Nakajima	WBC
1980-03-24	1982-02-06	(Panama) Hilario Zapata	WBC
1982-02-06	1982-04-13	(Mexico) Amado Ursua	WBC
1982-04-13	1982-07-20	(Japan) Tadashi Tomori	WBC
1982-07-20	1983-03-26	(Panama) Hilario Zapata	WBC
1983-03-26	1988-08-14-Retired	(South Korea) Jung-koo Chang	WBC
1988-12-11	1989-03-19	(Mexico) Germán Torres	WBC
1989-03-19	1989-06-25	(South Korea) Yul-woo Lee	WBC
1989-06-25	1990-12-19	(Mexico) Humberto González	WBC
1990-12-19	1991-03-25	(Philippines) Rolando Pascua	WBC
1991-03-25	1991-06-03	(Mexico) Melchor Cob Castro	WBC
1991-06-03	1993-03-13	(Mexico) Humberto González	WBC
1993-03-13	1994-02-19	(United States) Michael Carbajal	WBC
1994-02-19	1995-07-15	(Mexico) Humberto González	WBC
1995-07-15	1999-10-17	(Thailand) Saman Sorjaturong	WBC
1999-10-17	2002-07-06	(South Korea) Yo-sam Choi	WBC
2002-07-06	2004-12-18-Vacated	(Mexico) Jorge Arce	WBC
2005-03-11	2005-09-10	(Mexico) Eric Ortiz	WBC
2005-09-10	2006-08-10	(United States) Brian Viloria	WBC
2006-08-10	2007-02-01-Stripped	(Mexico) Omar Niño Romero	WBC
2007-04-14	2009-11-21	(Mexico) Edgar Sosa	WBC
2009-11-21	2010-06-19	(Philippines) Rodel Mayol	WBC
2010-06-19	2010-11-06	(Mexico) Omar Niño Romero	WBC
2010-11-06	2011-04-30	(Mexico) Gilberto Keb Baas	WBC
2011-04-30	2011-12-23	(Mexico) Adrian Hernández	WBC
2011-12-23	2012-08-06	(Thailand) Kompayak Porpramook	WBC
2012-08-06	2014-04-06	(Mexico) Adrian Hernández	WBC
2014-04-06	2014-11-03-Vacated	(Japan) Naoya Inoue	WBC
2014-12-30	2015-11-28	(Mexico) Pedro Guevara	WBC
2015-11-28	2016-03-04	(Japan) Yu Kimura	WBC
2016-03-04	2017-05-20	(Mexico) Ganigan López	WBC
2017-05-20	2021-09-22	(Japan) Kenshiro Teraji	WBC
2021-09-22	2022-03-19	(Japan) Masamichi Yabuki	WBC
2022-03-19	2024-07-15	(Japan) Kenshiro Teraji	WBC
2024-12-26	2025-08-01	(Thailand) Panya Pradabsri	WBC
2025-08-01	2025-11-28-Stripped	(Venezuela) Carlos Cañizales	WBC
2025-11-28	2026-03-15	(Thailand) Knockout CP Freshmart	WBC
2026-03-15	Present	(Japan) Shokichi Iwata	WBC

== WBA ==
Reign Began	Reign Ended	Champion	Recognition
Title inaugurated
1975-08-23	1976-07-02	(Panama) Jaime Rios	WBA
1976-07-02	1976-10-10	(Dominican Republic) Juan Antonio Guzman	WBA
1976-10-10	1981-03-08	(Japan) Yoko Gushiken	WBA
1981-03-08	1981-07-19	(Mexico) Pedro Flores	WBA
1981-07-19	1981-12-16	(South Korea) Hwan-jin Kim	WBA
1981-12-16	1983-07-10	(Japan) Katsuo Tokashiki	WBA
1983-07-10	1984-05-19	(Mexico) Lupe Madera	WBA
1984-05-19	1985-03-29	(Dominican Republic) Francisco Quiroz	WBA
1985-03-29	1985-12-08	(United States) Joey Olivo	WBA
1985-12-08	1991-12-17	(South Korea) Myung-woo Yuh	WBA
1991-12-17	1992-11-18	(Japan) Hiroki Ioka	WBA
1992-11-18	1993-07-25-Retired	(South Korea) Myung-woo Yuh	WBA
1993-10-21	1995-02-04	(Venezuela) Leo Gamez	WBA
1995-02-04	1996-01-13	(South Korea) Hi-yong Choi	WBA
1996-01-13	1996-05-21	(Panama) Carlos Murillo	WBA
1996-05-21	1996-12-03	(Japan) Keiji Yamaguchi	WBA
1996-12-03	2000-07-Vacated	(Thailand) Pichit Chor Siriwat	WBA
2000-08-12	2001-03-03	(Colombia) Beibis Mendoza	WBA
2001-03-03	2004-10-02-Stripped	(Nicaragua) Rosendo Álvarez	WBA
2005-04-29	2006-08-02-Vacated	(Panama) Roberto Vásquez	WBA
2006-08-02	2007-01-18-Vacated	(Japan) Kōki Kameda	WBA
2007-06-22	2007-12-08	(Argentina) Juan Carlos Reveco	WBA
2007-12-08	2008-07-18-Stripped	(France) Brahim Asloum	WBA
2009-06-05	2010-11-26-Vacated	(Mexico) Giovani Segura	WBA
2011-02-04	2014-01-14-Vacated	(Nicaragua) Román González	WBA
2014-01-14	2014-02-28-Vacated	(Japan) Kazuto Ioka	WBA
2014-07-08	2014-12-31	(Peru) Alberto Rossel	WBA
2014-12-31	2018-05-20	(Japan) Ryoichi Taguchi	WBA
2018-05-20	2018-12-31	(South Africa) Hekkie Budler	WBA
2018-12-31	2022-11-01	(Japan) Hiroto Kyoguchi	WBA
2022-11-01	2024-07-15	(Japan) Kenshiro Teraji	WBA
2024-12-19	2025-07-30	(Dominican Republic) Erick Rosa	WBA
2025-07-30	2025-17-12	(Japan) Kyosuke Takami	WBA
2025-12-17	Present	(Puerto Rico) René Santiago	WBA

== WBO ==
Reign Began	Reign Ended	Champion	Recognition
Title inaugurated
1989-05-19	1992-03-01-Stripped	(Puerto Rico) José de Jesús	WBO
1992-07-31	1994-07-15	(Puerto Rico) Josue Camacho	WBO
1994-07-15	1994-11-12-Stripped	(United States) Michael Carbajal	WBO
1994-11-23	1995-11-18	(United Kingdom) Paul Weir	WBO
1995-11-18	1997-02-08-Vacated	(South Africa) Jacob Matlala	WBO
1997-05-31	1997-08-25	(Mexico) Jesús Chong	WBO
1997-08-25	1998-01-17	(Mexico) Melchor Cob Castro	WBO
1998-01-17	1998-12-05	(Argentina) Juan Domingo Córdoba	WBO
1998-12-05	1999-07-31	(Mexico) Jorge Arce	WBO
1999-07-31	1999-08-Retired	(United States) Michael Carbajal	WBO
2000-02-19	2000-07-Stripped	(South Africa) Masibulele Makepula	WBO
2001-04-14	2005-04-30	(Puerto Rico) Nelson Dieppa	WBO
2005-04-30	2007-09-25	(Mexico) Hugo Fidel Cázares	WBO
2007-09-25	2010-08-28	(Puerto Rico) Iván Calderón	WBO
2010-08-28	2011-04-22-Vacated	(Mexico) Giovani Segura	WBO
2010-04-22	2011-04-30	(Colombia) Jesús Géles	WBO
2011-04-30	2011-10-08	(Mexico) Ramón García Hirales	WBO
2011-10-08	2016-08-03-Vacated	(Philippines) Donnie Nietes	WBO
2016-12-31	2017-11-30-Vacated	(Japan) Kosei Tanaka	WBO
2017-12-02	2019-06-21	(Puerto Rico) Ángel Acosta	WBO
2019-06-21	2021-10-16	(Mexico) Elwin Soto	WBO
2021-10-16	2024-06-19	(Puerto Rico) Jonathan Gonzalez	WBO
2024-10-13	2025-13-03	(Japan) Shokichi Iwata	WBO
2025-03-13	Present	(Puerto Rico) René Santiago	WBO

== See also ==
- List of British world boxing champions
