= Luis Alberto Lazarte =

Argentine boxer (born 1971)

Luis Lazarte
Personal information
- Nickname: El Mosquito
- Nationality: (Argentina) Argentine
- Born: Luis Alberto Lazarte; March 4, 1971 (age 55) Mar del Plata, Argentina
- Height: 5 ft 1 in (155 cm)
- Weight: Mini flyweight; Light flyweight; Flyweight; Super flyweight

Boxing career
- Stance: Orthodox

Boxing record
- Total fights: 67
- Wins: 52
- Win by KO: 18
- Losses: 12
- Draws: 2
- No contests: 1

Luis Alberto Lazarte (born March 4, 1971, in Mar del Plata, Buenos Aires, Argentina) is an Argentinean former professional boxer who has held the IBF junior flyweight title from May 2010 until April 2011.

== Professional career ==
He won the IBF junior flyweight title from Colombian Carlos Támara on May 29, 2010. Lazarte was the oldest reigning world boxing champion in the world, at 40 years old, until May 21, 2011. He lost his title by decision to former champion Ulises Solis on May 21, 2011. Lazarte also challenged for the world title twice at minimumweight (against Kermin Guardia and Daniel Reyes), twice more at light flyweight (against Édgar Sosa and John Riel Casimero) and twice at flyweight (against Pongsaklek Wonjongkam and Omar Narváez).

Lazarte's competitive boxing career effectively ended after he was given a rare lifetime ban by the International Boxing Federation following a February 10, 2012 match against Johnriel Casimero in which Lazarte, surrounded by supporters and fighting in his home country, intentionally leveled low blows, headbutts and illegal blows to the back of the head against Casimero, as well as biting him at least twice, threatened the referee's life after being warned for his conduct, then (after being ruled the loser) deliberately sparked a riot in the arena that caused numerous additional injuries to police, spectators and Casimero's team.

Philippine Foreign Affairs spokesman Raul Hernandez said that his country's embassy filed a protest with Argentina's Ministry of Foreign Affairs and is awaiting an explanation. His role in the riot resulted in a rare lifetime ban being given to Lazarte by the IBF. He announced his retirement afterwards but returned in 2014 for four extra, non IBF-sanctioned bouts.

== Professional boxing record ==
67 fights	52 wins	12 losses
By knockout	18	2
By decision	33	6
By disqualification	1	4
Draws	2	
No contests	1	

No.	Result	Record	Opponent	Type	Round, time	Date	Location	Notes
67	Loss	52-12-2 (1)	(Chile) Miguel Gonzalez	UD	11	2015-11-20	Gimnasio Club Mexico, Santiago de Chile, Chile	For vacant WBA Fedelatin super-flyweight title
66	Win	52-11-2 (1)	(Argentina) Carlos Ariel Farias	SD	10	2015-03-07	Cedem N°2, Caseros, Buenos Aires, Argentina	
65	Win	51-11-2 (1)	(Argentina) Elias David Coronel	UD	10	2014-11-29	C. A. Social y Deportivo Camioneros, Buenos Aires, Argentina	
64	Win	50-11-2 (1)	(Argentina) Roberto Carlos Marin	UD	8	2014-07-25	C. A. Social y Deportivo Camioneros, Buenos Aires, Argentina	
63	Loss	49-11-2 (1)	(Philippines) Johnriel Casimero	TKO	10 (12)	2012-02-10	Club Once Unidos, Mar del Plata, Argentina	For IBF interim light-flyweight title
62	Win	49-10-2 (1)	(Nicaragua) Nerys Espinoza	UD	12	2011-09-02	Club Once Unidos, Mar del Plata, Argentina	
61	Loss	48-10-2 (1)	(Mexico) Ulises Solís	SD	12	2011-04-30	Club Once Unidos, Mar del Plata, Argentina	Lost IBF light-flyweight title
60	Draw	48-9-2 (1)	(Mexico) Ulises Solís	MD	12	2010-12-18	Club Once Unidos, Mar del Plata, Argentina	Retained IBF light-flyweight title
59	Win	48-9-1 (1)	(Nicaragua) Nerys Espinoza	UD	12	2010-09-04	Club Once Unidos, Mar del Plata, Argentina	Retained IBF light-flyweight title
58	Win	47-9-1 (1)	(Colombia) Carlos Tamara	SD	12	2010-05-29	Club Once Unidos, Mar del Plata, Argentina	Won IBF light-flyweight title
57	Win	46-9-1 (1)	(Argentina) Raul Eliseo Medina	UD	10	2010-01-23	Club Once Unidos, Mar del Plata, Argentina	
56	Win	45-9-1 (1)	(Argentina) Juan Carlos Cejas	UD	6	2009-12-17	Unión de Padres Los Toritos, Monte Grande, Argentina	
55	Win	44-9-1 (1)	(Argentina) Sebastian Eladio Ferreyra	UD	6	2009-08-07	Club Domingo Faustino Sarmiento, Dolores, Argentina	
54	Win	43-9-1 (1)	(Argentina) Pedro Cardenas	TKO	2 (12)	2009-06-13	Club Once Unidos, Mar del Plata, Argentina	Retained South American light-flyweight title
53	Win	42-9-1 (1)	(Argentina) Gustavo Adrian Rodriguez	UD	12	2009-02-14	Club Once Unidos, Mar del Plata, Argentina	Retained South American light-flyweight title
52	Win	41-9-1 (1)	(Argentina) Sebastian Eladio Ferreyra	UD	6	2008-12-12	Club El Riojano, Balcarce, Argentina	
51	Loss	40-9-1 (1)	(Colombia) Daniel Reyes	MD	12	2008-09-26	Cedem N°2, Caseros, Buenos Aires, Argentina	For WBO interim mini-flyweight title
50	Win	40-8-1 (1)	(Argentina) Gustavo Adrian Rodriguez	UD	10	2008-06-06	Club Atletico Quilmes, Mar del Plata, Argentina	Won WBC Latino flyweight title
49	Win	39-8-1 (1)	(Argentina) Juan Carlos Cejas	UD	6	2008-04-26	Cedem N°2, Caseros, Buenos Aires, Argentina	
48	NC	38-8-1 (1)	(Argentina) Juan Carlos Cejas	ND	6	2008-02-23	Club Social y Deportivo Mar de Ajó, Mar de Ajo, Argentina	Both fighters disqualified
47	Win	38-8-1	(Argentina) Ricardo Ariel Toledo	UD	6	2007-11-17	Club Atletico Independiente, Avellaneda, Argentina	
46	Loss	37-8-1	(Mexico) Édgar Sosa	DQ	10 (12)	2007-07-28	Sindicato de Taxistas, Cancun, Mexico	For WBC light-flyweight title
45	Win	37-7-1	(Argentina) Ricardo Ariel Toledo	UD	8	2007-05-26	Polideportivo Roberto De Vicenzo, Berazategui, Argentina	
44	Win	36-7-1	(Argentina) Bernardo Ramón Albornoz	KO	2 (8)	2007-04-27	Club Deportivo Moron, Moron, Argentina	
43	Win	35-7-1	(Argentina) Carlos Pramacio Villagrán	DQ	2 (10)	2007-02-10	Club El Inca, San Francisco Solano, Argentina	
42	Win	34-7-1	(Peru) Alberto Rossel	UD	10	2007-01-13	Club Atletico Quilmes, Mar del Plata, Argentina	
41	Win	33-7-1	(Argentina) Mario Oscar Narváez	UD	8	2007-01-13	Club Atletico Independiente, Avellaneda, Argentina	
40	Win	32-7-1	(Brazil) Reginaldo Martins Carvalho	TKO	3 (8)	2006-09-30	Club Atletico Independiente, Avellaneda, Argentina	
39	Win	31-7-1	(Argentina) Ricardo Ariel Toledo	KO	1 (6)	2006-07-12	Club Atletico Independiente, Avellaneda, Argentina	
38	Win	30-7-1	(Argentina) Gustavo Adrián Rodríguez	UD	12	2006-03-18	Club Atletico Independiente, Avellaneda, Argentina	Retained South American light-flyweight title
37	Win	29-7-1	(Argentina) Pablo César Sepúlveda	KO	2 (8)	2006-01-27	Club Atletico Quilmes, Mar del Plata, Argentina	
36	Win	28-7-1	(Paraguay) Sixto Vera Espínola	RTD	3 (8)	2005-12-16	Club Atletico Independiente, Avellaneda, Argentina	
35	Win	27-7-1	(Argentina) Raúl Eliseo Medina	UD	12	2005-07-17	Club Atletico Quilmes, Mar del Plata, Argentina	Retained South American light-flyweight title
34	Win	26-7-1	(Argentina) Marcos Ramón Obregón	KO	5 (12)	2005-01-29	Club Atletico Quilmes, Mar del Plata, Argentina	Won vacant South American light-flyweight title
33	Win	25-7-1	(Argentina) Ángel Aníbal Torres	UD	6	2004-11-19	Mar del Plata, Argentina	
32	Win	24-7-1	(Argentina) Germán Guillermo Amado	KO	3 (6)	2004-11-19	Mar del Plata, Argentina	
31	Win	23-7-1	(Argentina) Pablo César Sepúlveda	UD	4	2004-05-24	Coronel Vidal, Argentina	
30	Win	22-7-1	(Argentina) Adolfo Luis Sosa	KO	6 (6)	2004-02-28	Club Atletico Mar del Plata, Mar del Plata, Argentina	
29	Win	21-7-1	(Argentina) Carlos Pramacio Villagrán	TKO	9 (10)	2004-01-10	Club Atletico Mar del Plata, Mar del Plata, Argentina	Retained Argentina mini-flyweight title
28	Loss	20-7-1	(Italy) Giuseppe Lagana	SD	12	2003-02-20	San Giuseppe Vesuviano, Italy	For WBO Inter-Continental flyweight title
27	Loss	20-6-1	(Argentina) Omar Narváez	DQ	10 (12)	2002-09-13	Gimnasio Municipal Nº 1, Trelew, Argentina	For WBO flyweight title
26	Win	20-5-1	(Argentina) Luis Osvaldo Monges	UD	8	2004-01-10	Estadio F.A.B., Buenos Aires, Argentina	
25	Loss	19-5-1	(Thailand) Pongsaklek Wonjongkam	TKO	2 (12)	2001-12-06	Jomtien Hotel, Pattaya, Thailand	For WBC flyweight title
24	Draw	19-4-1	(Argentina) Marcos Antonio Obregón	PTS	12	2001-08-17	Mar del Plata, Argentina	For vacant South American light-flyweight title
23	Loss	19-4	(Argentina) Marcos Antonio Obregón	SD	10	2001-06-30	Club Rivadavia, Necochea, Argentina	For vacant South American light-flyweight title
22	Loss	19-3	(Argentina) Horacio Fabián Chicagual	DQ	6 (10)	2001-04-14	Puerto Madryn, Argentina	
21	Win	19-2	(Argentina) Sandro Orlando Oviedo	UD	8	2000-03-11	Club Atletico Quilmes, Mar del Plata, Argentina	
20	Loss	18-2	(Colombia) Kermin Guardia	SD	12	1999-10-30	Estadio Polideportivo, Mar del Plata, Argentina	For WBO mini-flyweight title
19	Win	18–1	(Argentina) Carlos Mario Eluaiza	RTD	3 (12)	1999-09-25	Club Nolting, Ciudadela, Argentina	Retained Argentina mini-flyweight title; Won South American mini-flyweight title
18	Win	17–1	(Bolivia) Luis Alberto Ortiz	TD	10	1999-03-12	Mar del Plata, Argentina	
17	Win	16–1	(Argentina) Alfredo Saturnino Rivero	TKO	2	1999-01-10	Club Atletico Quilmes, Mar del Plata, Argentina	
16	Win	15–1	(Argentina) Marcelo Antonio Davila	TKO	5	1998-11-20	Mar del Plata, Argentina	
15	Win	14–1	(Argentina) Roberto Enrique Vallejos	KO	4	1998-09-11	Mar del Plata, Argentina	
14	Win	13–1	(Argentina) Jose Luis Ferreira	PTS	12	1998-08-07	Dolores, Argentina	Retained Argentina light-flyweight title
13	Win	12–1	(Argentina) Carlos Mario Eluaiza	KO	9 (12)	1998-04-18	Estadio F.A.B., Buenos Aires, Argentina	Won Argentina mini-flyweight title
12	Win	11–1	(Argentina) Carlos Mario Eluaiza	PTS	12	1998-02-27	Mar del Plata, Argentina	Won vacant Argentina light-flyweight title
11	Win	10–1	(Argentina) Pantaleon Altamirano	RTD	6 (6)	1998-02-13	Club Atletico Quilmes, Mar del Plata, Argentina	
10	Loss	9–1	(Argentina) Marcelo Antonio Davila	DQ	8 (8)	1998-01-16	Club Atletico Quilmes, Mar del Plata, Argentina	
9	Win	9–0	(Argentina) Roberto Enrique Vallejos	PTS	8	1997-11-22	Estadio F.A.B., Buenos Aires, Argentina	
8	Win	8–0	(Argentina) Ruben Asencio Molina	PTS	6	1997-08-02	Estadio F.A.B., Buenos Aires, Argentina	
7	Win	7–0	(Argentina) Luis Walter Oliva	PTS	6	1997-04-05	Tandil, Argentina	
6	Win	6–0	(Argentina) Orlando Adolfo Kispe	PTS	6	1997-02-28	Mar del Plata, Argentina	
5	Win	5–0	(Argentina) Mario Crispin Romero	PTS	4	1997-02-14	Villa Carlos Paz, Argentina	
4	Win	4–0	(Argentina) Luis Oscar Noriega	PTS	6	1997-01-31	Mar del Plata, Argentina	
3	Win	3–0	(Argentina) Sergio Daniel Villarreal	PTS	6	1997-01-10	Mar del Plata, Argentina	
2	Win	2–0	(Argentina) Roberto Carlos Martinez	KO	3 (6)	1996-07-05	Mar del Plata, Argentina	
1	Win	1–0	(Argentina) Angel Antonio Barros	KO	2 (6)	1996-03-02	Mar del Plata, Argentina	

== See also ==
- List of light-flyweight boxing champions
- Boxing at the 1995 Pan American Games

Achievements
Preceded by Carlos Tamara	IBF light flyweight champion May 29, 2010 - April 30, 2011	Succeeded by Ulises Solís
