= Víctor Burgos =

Mexican boxer

Victor Burgos
Personal information
- Nicknames: El Acorazado "The One With Heart"
- Born: José Víctor Flores Burgos; 10 April 1974 (age 52) Copala, Sinaloa, Mexico
- Weight: Bantamweight; Flyweight; Light Flyweight

Boxing career
- Stance: Orthodox

Boxing record
- Total fights: 57
- Wins: 39
- Win by KO: 23
- Losses: 15
- Draws: 3
- No contests: 0

José Víctor Flores Burgos (born 10 April 1974) is a Mexican professional boxer. Víctor is the former IBF Light Flyweight Champion.

== Professional career ==
Burgos' career has been marked by his mediocre record—after turning pro in 1993, he lost his first 4 fights, 2 by KO. Burgos kept fighting and eventually had better success.

=== IBF Light Flyweight championship ===
In February 2003, Víctor won the vacant IBF Light Flyweight Championship in a bout with Alex Sánchez.

=== WBA Light Flyweight championship ===
On December 13, 2003 he fought for Rosendo Álvarez WBA Light Flyweight Championship, the fight ended in a draw.

He lost the title to Will Grigsby in 2005, and rebounded with two wins in the flyweight division to set up a title fight with Vic Darchinyan for the IBF flyweight belt.

=== IBF & IBO Flyweight Championships ===
On March 3, 2007 Burgos fought Vic Darchinyan at the Home Depot Center in Los Angeles. Burgos was knocked down and between the 10th and 11th rounds, the referee went to Burgos' corner to inquire to his fitness to continue. The corner cleared Burgos to continue. In the 12th, Burgos was again on the receiving end of a flurry, and the referee ended the fight, a TKO loss. Burgos then passed out on the stool in his corner; he was taken on a stretcher with a neck brace to LA County Harbor-UCLA Medical Center, where doctors removed a blood clot from his brain and induced a coma. Burgos was moved out of the Intensive Care Unit to a regular room. He has been recognizing friends and family members.

== Professional boxing record ==
57 fights	39 wins	15 losses
By knockout	23	5
By decision	15	10
By disqualification	1	0
Draws	3	

No.	Result	Record	Opponent	Type	Round, time	Date	Location	Notes
57	Loss	39–15–3	Vic Darchinyan	TKO	12 (12)	3 Mar 2007	Home Depot Center, Carson, California, U.S.	For IBF and IBO Flyweight title
56	Win	39–14–3	Luis Doria	UD	10	2006-05-06	DCU Center, Worcester, Massachusetts, U.S.	
55	Win	38–14–3	Javier Murillo	KO	10 (10)	2005-09-19	Auditorio Municipal, Tijuana, Baja California, Mexico	
54	Loss	37–14–3	Will Grigsby	UD	12	2005-05-14	MGM Grand Garden Arena, Las Vegas, Nevada, U.S.	Lost IBF Light Flyweight title
53	Win	37–13–3	Fahlan Sakkreerin	TKO	6 (12)	2004-05-15	Mandalay Bay Resort & Casino, Las Vegas, Nevada, U.S.	Retained IBF Light Flyweight title
52	Draw	36–13–3	Rosendo Álvarez	SD	12	2003-12-13	Boardwalk Hall, Atlantic City, New Jersey, U.S.	Retained IBF Light Flyweight title For WBA Light Flyweight title
51	Win	36–13–2	Alex Sánchez	TKO	12 (12)	2003-02-15	Caesars Palace, Las Vegas, Nevada, U.S.	Won IBF Light Flyweight title
50	Draw	35–13–2	Alex Sánchez	SD	12	2002-05-11	Roberto Clemente Coliseum, San Juan, Puerto Rico	IBF Light Flyweight Title Eliminator.
49	Win	35–13–1	Jose de Jesus Robles	KO	1 (10)	2001-12-17	Tijuana, Baja California, Mexico	
48	Win	34–13–1	Juan Alfonso Keb Baas	UD	10	2001-10-20	Auditorio Municipal, Tijuana, Baja California, Mexico	
47	Win	33–13–1	Jose Luis Velarde	TKO	3 (10)	2001-09-14	Tijuana, Baja California, Mexico	
46	Win	32–13–1	Aaron Sepulveda	TKO	4 (10)	2001-07-06	Frontón Palacio Jai Alai, Tijuana, Baja California, Mexico	
45	Win	31–13–1	Victor Hernandez	UD	12	2001-05-05	Tijuana, Baja California, Mexico	Won WBO Americas Light Flyweight title
44	Loss	30–13–1	Roberto Carlos Leyva	TKO	8 (12)	2000-12-04	Frontón Palacio Jai Alai, Tijuana, Baja California, Mexico	Lost WBO NABO Light Flyweight title
43	Win	30–12–1	Juan Javier Lagos	PTS	12	2000-09-11	Tijuana, Baja California, Mexico	Retained WBO NABO Light Flyweight title
42	Win	29–12–1	Alejandro Padilla	KO	4 (10)	2000-07-22	Tijuana, Baja California, Mexico	
41	Win	28–12–1	Patricio Valenzuela	KO	2 (10)	2000-05-27	Tijuana, Baja California, Mexico	
40	Win	27–12–1	Christian Hernandez	KO	2 (10)	2000-03-27	Tijuana, Baja California, Mexico	
39	Win	26–12–1	Juan Carlos Moreno	TKO	4 (12)	2000-02-04	Tijuana, Baja California, Mexico	Won WBO NABO Light Flyweight title
38	Win	25–12–1	Ruben Arteaga	TKO	3 (10)	1999-02-08	Tijuana, Baja California, Mexico	
37	Loss	24–12–1	Jesper Jensen	UD	12	1998-11-06	K.B. Hallen, Copenhagen, Denmark	For IBC Super Flyweight title
36	Loss	24–11–1	Eric Morel	UD	12	1998-10-17	Casa Blanca Hotel, Mesquite, Nevada, U.S.	For IBA Super Flyweight title
35	Win	24–10–1	Jaime Lopez	TKO	3 (8)	1998-09-12	Plaza de Toros, Tijuana, Baja California, Mexico	
34	Loss	23–10–1	Mike Trejo	KO	6 (8)	1998-08-06	City Coliseum, Austin, Texas, U.S.	
33	Loss	23–9–1	Jacob Matlala	TD	8 (12)	1998-02-20	Argosy Festival Atrium, Baton Rouge, Louisiana, U.S.	For IBA Light Flyweight title
32	Win	23–8–1	Jorge Arce	PTS	12	1997-12-12	Auditorio Municipal, Tijuana, Baja California, Mexico	Won WBA Fedecentro Light Flyweight title
31	Loss	22–8–1	Alex Sánchez	UD	12	1997-03-29	Hilton Hotel, Las Vegas, Nevada, U.S.	For WBO Minimumweight title
30	Win	22–7–1	Oscar Aguilar	TKO	5 (10)	1996-12-16	Tijuana, Baja California, Mexico	
29	Win	21–7–1	Alberto Martinez	PTS	10	1996-10-05	Tijuana, Baja California, Mexico	
28	Win	20–7–1	Tomas Cordoba	TKO	7 (12)	1996-04-30	Auditorio Municipal, Tijuana, Baja California, Mexico	Retained Mexico Light Flyweight title
27	Win	19–7–1	Jose Luis Zepeda	TD	11 (12)	1996-02-12	Tijuana, Baja California, Mexico	Retained Mexico Light Flyweight title
26	Win	18–7–1	Juventino Delgado	TKO	5 (8)	1995-12-12	Tijuana, Baja California, Mexico	
25	Win	17–7–1	Edgar Cárdenas	PTS	12	1995-10-24	Tijuana, Baja California, Mexico	Won Mexico Light Flyweight title
24	Win	16–7–1	Jorge Luis Roman	PTS	12	1995-09-18	Tijuana, Baja California, Mexico	Won Baja California State Flyweight title
23	Win	15–7–1	Ruben Arteaga	TKO	12 (12)	1995-07-01	Mexico	
22	Draw	14–7–1	Jose Luis Herrera	PTS	12	1995-06-23	Centro de Espectáculos Aragon's, Mexicali, Baja California, Mexico	For Baja California State Flyweight title
21	Win	14–7	Juventino Delgado	KO	6 (6)	1995-05-26	Tijuana, Baja California, Mexico	
20	Win	13–7	Pedro Morquecho	DQ	6 (10)	1995-04-28	Centro de Espectáculos Aragon's, Mexicali, Baja California, Mexico	
19	Win	12–7	Juan Akira	TKO	6 (8)	1995-03-13	Tijuana, Baja California, Mexico	
18	Win	11–7	Manuel Valenzuela	TKO	6 (6)	1995-02-18	San Luis Rio Colorado, Sonora, Mexico	
17	Win	10–7	Leonardo Gutierrez	UD	4	1995-02-03	Centro de Espectáculos Aragon's, Mexicali, Baja California, Mexico	
16	Win	9–7	Leonardo Gutierrez	UD	4	1994-12-04	San Felipe, Guanajuato, Mexico	
15	Loss	8–7	Carlos Cantu	PTS	6	1994-10-24	Great Western Forum, Inglewood, California, U.S.	
14	Win	8–6	Jose Luis Aguilar	PTS	4	1994-09-28	Huntington Park, California, U.S.	
13	Loss	7–6	Jose Orejel	PTS	6	1994-08-22	Tijuana, Baja California, Mexico	
12	Win	7–5	Jose Antonio Mulgado	PTS	4	1994-06-10	Ensenada, Baja California, Mexico	
11	Loss	6–5	Tomas Cordoba	PTS	4	1994-05-13	Tijuana, Baja California, Mexico	
10	Win	6–4	Juventino Delgado	TKO	4 (6)	1994-04-25	Tecate, Baja California, Mexico	
9	Win	5–4	Luis Lopez	TKO	4 (6)	1994-03-22	Tijuana, Baja California, Mexico	
8	Win	4–4	Heriberto Vasquez	KO	4 (4)	1994-02-01	Tecate, Baja California, Mexico	
7	Win	3–4	Ricardo Lopez	PTS	4	1993-11-26	Tijuana, Baja California, Mexico	
6	Win	2–4	Enrique Vega	TKO	4 (4)	1993-10-22	Tijuana, Baja California, Mexico	
5	Win	1–4	Tomas Cordoba	PTS	4	1993-09-06	Caliente Hipódromo, Tijuana, Baja California, Mexico	
4	Loss	0–4	Osvaldo Guerrero	TKO	1 (4)	1993-07-08	Plaza de Toros, Tijuana, Baja California, Mexico	
3	Loss	0–3	Jose Antonio Mulgado	TKO	2 (4)	1993-05-14	Plaza de Toros Calafia, Mexicali, Baja California, Mexico	
2	Loss	0–2	Jose DiMino	UD	4	1993-04-24	Aladdin Hotel & Casino, Las Vegas, Nevada, U.S.	
1	Loss	0–1	Jose Landin	PTS	4	1993-02-05	DoubleTree Hotel, Monterey, California, U.S.	

== Personal life ==
His nephew Juan Carlos Burgos, is a featherweight prospect.

== See also ==
- List of world light-flyweight boxing champions
- List of Mexican boxing world champions
- Notable boxing families

Sporting positions
World boxing titles
Vacant Title last held by Ricardo López	IBF Light flyweight champion February 15, 2003 – May 14, 2005	Succeeded by Will Grigsby
