= Brian Viloria =

American boxer (born 1980)

Personal information
- Born: Brian Costales Viloria; November 24, 1980 (age 45) Waipahu, Hawaii, U.S.
- Height: 5 ft 4 in (163 cm)
- Weight: Light flyweight; Flyweight

Boxing career
- Reach: 66 in (168 cm)
- Stance: Orthodox

Boxing record
- Total fights: 46
- Wins: 38
- Win by KO: 23
- Losses: 6
- Draws: 0
- No contests: 2
Medal record
Representing United States
Men's boxing
World Amateur Championships
Gold medal – first place	Houston 1999	Light flyweight

Brian Viloria (born November 24, 1980) is a retired American professional boxer of Filipino descent. He is a former unified WBA and WBO flyweight champion, as well as a former WBC and IBF light flyweight champion. His nickname of "The Hawaiian Punch" was first given to him by Jesus Salud, a fellow Hawaiian of Filipino descent and himself a former world champion in boxing.

== Amateur career ==
In 1999, he won the US championships, the national Golden Gloves and the world title as an amateur at the 1999 World Amateur Boxing Championships in Houston, Texas but lost early at the Sydney Olympics 2000 against Brahim Asloum, who he had beaten in the 1999 World Championships in Houston, Texas. His overall record was 230–8.

He went to Northern Michigan University as part of the United States Olympic Education Center. Viloria bested both Glenn Donaire in the quarter-finals, and future world champion Nonito Donaire in the semi-finals of the 2000 US Olympic Trials. He won a spot on the 2000 Olympic team by defeating his one-time teammate, Karoz Norman.

Viloria went to the Sydney Olympics as a medal favorite, but lost to eventual gold medalist Brahim Asloum of France, 6–4. Viloria landed dozens of body punches but the judges did not award points for his blows.

=== Amateur Highlights ===
- 1995 National Junior Olympics Gold Medalist at 100 lbs.
- 1996 National Junior Olympics Gold Medalist at 106 lbs.
- 1996 World Junior Olympics Gold Medalist at 106 lbs.
- 1997 National Junior Olympics Bronze Medalist at 112 lbs.
- 1998 National Amateur Championships Bronze Medalist at 106 lbs.
- 1999 National Amateur Championships Gold Medalist at 106 lbs.
- 1999 National Golden Gloves Light Flyweight Gold Medalist
- 1999 World Amateur Championships Gold Medalist
- 1999 USA Boxer of The Year
- Member of the 2000 US Olympic Team. His results were:
  - Defeated Sergey Kazakov (Russia) 8–6
  - Lost to Brahim Asloum (France) 4–6

== Professional career ==
=== Flyweight ===
Viloria started his professional career as a flyweight and picked up 17 wins with no defeats. He also captured and defended the NABF Flyweight title in the process before moving down to the Light Flyweight division.

=== Light Flyweight ===
On September 10, 2005, Viloria dropped down to light flyweight and won the WBC crown by knocking out Eric Ortiz in the first round with a powerful right.

He successfully defended it once on February 18, 2006, against José Antonio Aguirre (boxer) and was undefeated in 20 bouts. Viloria's unbeaten streak ended when he was dethroned by Mexican Omar Niño Romero on August 10, 2006.

In a rematch held on November 18, 2006, at Las Vegas, Romero held on to his title with a controversial majority draw decision, with Viloria knocking down Romero twice during the fight. Romero was then stripped of his title after failing a post fight drug test for methamphetamine and the decision was overturned into a no-contest.

On April 14, 2007, he fought Edgar Sosa for the vacant WBC Light Flyweight title but lost via majority decision.

=== Super Flyweight ===
Viloria then decided to move up to the super flyweight division and began training under former champion, Robert Garcia, at La Colonia Gym in Oxnard, California.

Brian Viloria won via unanimous decision against Jose Garcia Bernal (26–11–1) in his debut at the super flyweight division at the Alameda Swap Meet in Los Angeles, California on January 5, 2008. Viloria secured four more victories before deciding to move back down to Light Flyweight.

=== Return to Light Flyweight ===
On April 19, 2009, Viloria moved back down to junior flyweight to challenge Mexican Ulises "Archie" Solís for the IBF Junior Flyweight title. Pressured by a fading career due to his past losses in big fights, Viloria defeated Solis, whom at the time of the fight was rated the #1 Jr. Flyweight by The Ring in the 11th round with a vicious right to the jaw. The official bout stoppage was a KO 2:56 into the 11th round. The fight was held at Araneta Coliseum in the Philippines, site of the Thrilla in Manila, as the co-main event of the Donaire-Martinez fight. Viloria snapped Solis' 11-fight unbeaten streak, 8 of which were title defenses while extending his win streak to 6.

Viloria successfully defended his IBF Junior Flyweight title on August 29, 2009, against Jesus Iribe.

For his second defense, Viloria fought Carlos Tamara of Colombia on January 23, 2010. Though leading in points, the referee called a halt to the bout in Tamara's favor as Viloria was close to passing out in the twelfth round awarding Tamara a TKO victory and the belt. Moments following the bout, Viloria passed out due to extreme exhaustion.

=== Return to Flyweight ===
Viloria returned to the flyweight division against Mexico's Omar Soto on July 10, 2010, at the Yñares Sports Arena, Pasig, Metro Manila.

On July 16, 2011, Viloria captured the WBO Flyweight title by besting Mexican Julio César Miranda. On December 10, 2011, Viloria stopped Giovani Segura by way of an 8th Round TKO. On May 13, 2012, Viloria stopped his rival Omar Niño Romero in the 9th round for another successful defense of his WBO Flyweight title.

On November 17, 2012, Viloria challenged Hernan Marquez in a flyweight unification between his WBO title and the Marquez's WBA crown. He went on to stop Marquez in 10 rounds becoming the first flyweight unified world champion since 1965. Viloria then lost both titles to Juan Francisco Estrada on April 6, 2013.

Viloria picked up four more wins before facing pound for pound king Román González on October 17, 2015, for the WBC and The Ring Flyweight titles. Viloria was stopped in the 9th round and lost via TKO. At the time of the stoppage, the scorecards were 78–73, 78-73 and 79–72 in favor of Gonzalez.

Viloria, ranked #2 by the WBA, later fought Artem Dalakian, who was ranked #1 by the WBA, on February 24, 2018, for the WBA flyweight title but lost by unanimous decision. He implicitly retired after the fight.

== Professional boxing record ==
46 fights	38 wins	6 losses
By knockout	23	2
By decision	15	4
No contests	2	

No.	Result	Record	Opponent	Type	Round, time	Date	Location	Notes
46	Loss	38–6 (2)	Artem Dalakian	UD	12	Feb 24, 2018	The Forum, Inglewood, California, U.S.	For vacant WBA flyweight title
45	Win	38–5 (2)	Miguel Cartagena	KO	5 (10)	Sep 9, 2017	StubHub Center, Carson, California, U.S.	
44	Win	37–5 (2)	Ruben Montoya	UD	10	Mar 2, 2017	Kokugikan, Tokyo, Japan	
43	Loss	36–5 (2)	Román González	TKO	9 (12), 2:53	Oct 17, 2015	Madison Square Garden, New York City, New York, U.S.	For WBC and The Ring flyweight titles
42	Win	36–4 (2)	Omar Soto	KO	1 (8), 2:02	Jul 25, 2015	Florentine Gardens, Hollywood, California, U.S.	
41	Win	35–4 (2)	Armando Vazquez	KO	4 (10), 1:37	Dec 6, 2014	Civic Auditorium, Glendale, California, U.S.	
40	Win	34–4 (2)	José Alfredo Zúñiga	KO	5 (10), 1:42	Jul 19, 2014	CotaiArena, Venetian Resort, Macao	
39	Win	33–4 (2)	Juan Herrera	UD	10	Mar 29, 2014	Texas Station Casino, Las Vegas, Nevada, U.S.	
38	Loss	32–4 (2)	Juan Francisco Estrada	SD	12	Apr 6, 2013	CotaiArena, Venetian Resort, Macao	Lost WBA (Unified) and WBO flyweight titles
37	Win	32–3 (2)	Hernán Márquez	TKO	10 (12), 1:01	Nov 17, 2012	Home Depot Center, Carson, California, U.S.	Retained WBO flyweight title; Won WBA (Unified) flyweight title
36	Win	31–3 (2)	Omar Niño Romero	TKO	9 (12), 2:07	May 13, 2012	Yñares Sports Arena, Pasig, Metro Manila, Philippines	Retained WBO flyweight title
35	Win	30–3 (2)	Giovani Segura	TKO	8 (12), 0:29	Dec 10, 2011	Yñares Sports Arena, Pasig, Metro Manila, Philippines	Retained WBO flyweight title
34	Win	29–3 (2)	Julio César Miranda	UD	12	Jul 16, 2011	Blaisdell Center, Honolulu, Hawaii, U.S.	Won WBO flyweight title
33	Win	28–3 (2)	Liempetch Sor Veerapol	TKO	7 (10), 2:09	Nov 5, 2010	Yñares Sports Arena, Pasig, Metro Manila, Philippines	
32	Win	27–3 (2)	Omar Soto	SD	10	Jul 10, 2010	Yñares Sports Arena, Pasig, Metro Manila, Philippines	
31	Loss	26–3 (2)	Carlos Tamara	TKO	12 (12), 1:45	Jan 23, 2010	Cuneta Astrodome, Pasay, Metro Manila, Philippines	Lost IBF light flyweight title
30	Win	26–2 (2)	Jesus Iribe	UD	12	Aug 29, 2009	Blaisdell Center, Honolulu, Hawaii, U.S.	Retained IBF light flyweight title
29	Win	25–2 (2)	Ulises Solís	KO	11 (12), 2:56	Apr 19, 2009	Araneta Coliseum, Quezon City, Metro Manila, Philippines	Won IBF light flyweight title
28	Win	24–2 (2)	Benjamin Garcia	KO	2 (10), 1:17	Dec 12, 2008	Alameda Swap Meet, Los Angeles, California, U.S.	
27	Win	23–2 (2)	Juan Javier Lagos	UD	8	Sep 25, 2008	Sycuan Resort & Casino, El Cajon, California, U.S.	
26	Win	22–2 (2)	Fred Heberto Valdez	KO	3 (10), 2:10	May 17, 2008	Plaza de Toros Monumental, Aguascalientes, Aguascalientes, Mexico	
25	Win	21–2 (2)	Cesar Lopez	UD	8	Feb 16, 2008	MGM Grand, Las Vegas, Nevada, U.S.	
24	Win	20–2 (2)	Jose Garcia Bernal	UD	8	Jan 4, 2008	Alameda Swap Meet, Los Angeles, California, U.S.	
23	Loss	19–2 (2)	Édgar Sosa	MD	12	Apr 14, 2007	Alamodome, San Antonio, Texas, U.S.	For vacant WBC light flyweight title
22	NC	19–1 (2)	Omar Niño Romero	ND	12	Nov 18, 2006	Thomas & Mack Center, Las Vegas, Nevada, U.S.	WBC light flyweight title; Originally an MD, later ruled an NC after Romero failed a drug test
21	Loss	19–1 (1)	Omar Niño Romero	UD	12	Aug 10, 2006	Orleans Hotel & Casino, Las Vegas, Nevada, U.S.	Lost WBC light flyweight title
20	Win	19–0 (1)	José Antonio Aguirre	UD	12	Feb 18, 2006	The Aladdin, Las Vegas, Nevada, U.S.	Retained WBC light flyweight title
19	Win	18–0 (1)	Eric Ortiz	KO	1 (12), 2:59	Sep 10, 2005	Staples Center, Los Angeles, California, U.S.	Won WBC light flyweight title
18	Win	17–0 (1)	Ruben Contreras	TKO	6 (8), 0:55	May 28, 2005	Staples Center, Los Angeles, California, U.S.	
17	Win	16–0 (1)	Angel Antonio Priolo	KO	7 (12), 0:54	Dec 16, 2004	Olympic Auditorium, Los Angeles, California, U.S.	
16	Win	15–0 (1)	Gilberto Keb Baas	KO	11 (12), 2:42	Jun 4, 2004	Desert Diamond Casino, Tucson, Arizona, U.S.	Retained NABF flyweight title
15	Win	14–0 (1)	Juan Alfonso Keb Baas	UD	12	Feb 13, 2004	Mohegan Sun Casino, Uncasville, Connecticut, U.S.	Retained NABF flyweight title
14	Win	13–0 (1)	Luis Doria	TKO	1 (10), 1:14	Jul 22, 2003	Venture Resort, Pismo Beach, California, U.S.	Retained WBC Youth flyweight title
13	Win	12–0 (1)	Valentin Leon	TKO	8 (10)	Apr 15, 2003	Sheraton Waikiki Hotel, Honolulu, Hawaii, U.S.	
12	Win	11–0 (1)	Alejandro Moreno	UD	12	Jan 10, 2003	Mohegan Sun Casino, Uncasville, Connecticut, U.S.	Retained NABF flyweight title
11	Win	10–0 (1)	Alberto Rossel	MD	12	Nov 24, 2002	Sports Plus Events Center, Lake Grove, New York, U.S.	Retained NABF flyweight title
10	Win	9–0 (1)	Juan Javier Lagos	UD	12	Aug 30, 2002	Cipriani's Restaurant, New York, New York, U.S.	Won NABF flyweight title
9	NC	8–0 (1)	Alberto Rossel	UD	12	Jul 26, 2002	Mountaineer Casino, Racetrack and Resort, Chester, West Virginia, U.S.	
8	Win	8–0	Francisco Soto	TKO	5 (10), 1:18	Jun 18, 2002	Thoroughbred Club, Del Mar, California, U.S.	Won WBC Youth flyweight title
7	Win	7–0	Sandro Orlando Oviedo	KO	1 (8), 0:38	May 17, 2002	Blaisdell Center Arena, Honolulu, Hawaii, U.S.	
6	Win	6–0	Leonardo Gutierrez	TKO	4 (6)	Mar 15, 2002	Cipriani's Restaurant, New York City, New York, U.S.	
5	Win	5–0	Antonio Perez	TKO	3 (6), 2:40	Jan 5, 2002	Freeman Coliseum, San Antonio, Texas, U.S.	
4	Win	4–0	Mike Thomas	UD	4	Nov 23, 2001	Roseland Ballroom, New York City, New York, U.S.	
3	Win	3–0	Sheldon Wile	TKO	1 (4)	Nov 9, 2001	Philadelphia, Pennsylvania, U.S.	
2	Win	2–0	Kenny Berrios	TKO	4 (4), 1:35	Sep 28, 2001	USF War Memorial Gym, San Francisco, California, U.S.	
1	Win	1–0	Benjamin Escobia	UD	4	May 15, 2001	Hawaii Convention Center, Honolulu, Hawaii, U.S.	

== Titles in boxing ==
=== Major world titles ===
- WBC light flyweight champion (108 lbs)
- IBF light flyweight champion (108 lbs)
- WBA (Unified) flyweight champion (112 lbs)
- WBO flyweight champion (112 lbs)

=== Regional titles ===
- NABF flyweight champion (112 lbs)
- WBC Youth flyweight champion (112 lbs)

== Outside the ring ==
On September 6, 2009, Viloria, who was in attendance at the World Cup of Pool, was chosen to perform the ceremonial break shot before the start of the final match. Because he never played pocket billiards before, Viloria miscued on his first attempt but achieved the shot on his second.

== Filmography ==
=== Television ===
Year	Title	Role	Network
2006	Magpakailanman: Suntok Sa Tagumpay - The Brian Viloria Story	JC de Vera	GMA Network

== See also ==
- List of light-flyweight boxing champions
- List of flyweight boxing champions
- List of Filipino boxing world champions

Sporting positions
World boxing titles
Preceded by Eric Ortiz	WBC light flyweight champion September 10, 2005 - August 10, 2006	Succeeded by Omar Niño Romero
Preceded by Ulises Solís	IBF light flyweight champion April 19, 2009 - January 23, 2010	Succeeded by Carlos Tamara
Preceded by Julio César Miranda	WBO flyweight champion July 16, 2011 - April 6, 2013	Succeeded by Juan Francisco Estrada
New title	WBA flyweight champion Unified Title; November 17, 2012 - April 6, 2013	Succeeded by Juan Francisco Estrada
