= Felipe Salguero =

Mexican boxer

Personal information
- Nationality: Mexican
- Born: Felipe Salguero Tijuana, Baja California, Mexico
- Weight: Bantamweight; Super Flyweight; Flyweight; Light flyweight Minimumweight

Boxing career
- Stance: Orthodox

Boxing record
- Total fights: 33
- Wins: 24
- Win by KO: 14
- Losses: 7
- Draws: 2
- No contests: 0

Felipe Salguero is a Mexican former professional boxer. He is a former WBF light flyweight champion and interim WBC Youth World light flyweight champion. Salguero is a two time world title challenger.

Regional/International Titles:

- WBF Light Flyweight Champion (108 lbs)
- WBC Interim Youth Light Flyweight Champion (105 lbs)

== Professional boxing record ==
24 Wins (14 knockouts, 10 decisions), 7 Loss, 2 Draws
| Res. | Record | Opponent | Type | Round Time | Date | Location | Notes |
| Win | 24–7–2 | (Mexico) Joan Flores | UD | 6 | 2016-12-15 | Mexico | |
| Win | 23–7–2 | (Mexico) Pedro Palma | UD | 6 | 2016-08-19 | Mexico | |
