= Orlando Malone =

American boxer

Personal information
- Nickname: Quick Draw
- Nationality: American
- Born: December 18, 1963 (age 62) San Diego, California, U.S.
- Height: 160 cm (5 ft 3 in)
- Weight: Mini flyweight; Light flyweight; Flyweight; Bantamweight

Boxing career
- Stance: Southpaw

Boxing record
- Total fights: 33
- Wins: 10
- Win by KO: 7
- Losses: 22
- No contests: 1

Orlando Max Malone (born December 18, 1963), is an American former professional boxer who competed from 1992 to 2007. He challenged for the WBO mini flyweight title in 1993.

== Professional career ==
Malone started boxing at the age of 21. After an amateur career which included winning an area title at the US Amateur Boxing Championships in 1991 and the Class A 106-pound title in the Colorado Golden Gloves tournament in 1992, he had his first professional fight in August 1992.

== Professional boxing record ==
33 fights	10 wins	22 losses
By knockout	7	8
By decision	3	14
No contests	1	

No.	Result	Record	Opponent	Type	Round, time	Date	Location	Notes
14	Loss	9–5	(United States) Eric Griffin	TKO	4 (12)	1994-05-10	(United States) Mashantucket, Connecticut	For NABF light flyweight title.
13	Loss	9–4	(United States) Brian Lonon	MD	8	1994-03-17	(United States) Las Vegas, Nevada	
12	Loss	9–3	(United States) Rudy Bradley	UD	8	1994-02-17	(United States) Scottsdale, Arizona	
11	Loss	9–2	(Puerto Rico) Alex Sanchez	TKO	1 (12)	1993-12-22	Hotel Caribe Hilton, Condado, Puerto Rico	For vacant WBO minimumweight title.
10	Win	9–1	(United States) Jose Vela	TKO	2 (8)	1993-12-02	(United States) Aurora, Colorado	
9	Loss	8–1	(United States) Danny Romero	TKO	5 (8)	1993-08-09	(United States) Tingley Coliseum, Albuquerque, New Mexico	
8	Win	8–0	(United States) Scott Lawless	KO	1 (6)	1993-07-02	(United States) McNichols Sports Arena, Denver, Colorado	
7	Win	7–0	(United States) John Knight	UD	4	1993-06-18	(United States) Aurora, Colorado	
6	Win	6–0	(United States) Martin Llovera	TKO	4 (6)	1993-05-04	(United States) McNichols Sports Arena, Denver, Colorado	
5	Win	5–0	(United States) Melvin Lewis	KO	1 (8)	1993-04-17	(United States) Denver, Colorado	
4	Win	4–0	(United States) Warren Iyescas	UD	4	1993-03-20	(United States) Denver, Colorado	
3	Win	3–0	(United States) Rod Taylor	TKO	4 (6)	1992-11-21	(United States) Thornton, Colorado	
2	Win	2–0	(United States) Rick Banks	KO	1 (4)	1992-10-30	(United States) Aurora, Colorado	
1	Win	1–0	(United States) Merle Muniz	UD	4	1992-08-14	(United States) Thornton, Colorado	
