= Jesús Jiménez (boxer) =

Mexican boxer (born 1984)

Jesús Jiménez (born 4 June 1984) is a Mexican former professional boxer who competed from 2000 to 2017, challenging for the WBA flyweight title in 2011.

== Professional career ==
On 29 January 2011 Jiménez lost to Javier Polanco for the WBA flyweight title.
