= Nelson Dieppa =

Puerto Rican boxer (born 1971)

Personal information
- Nickname: Fuegete
- Nationality: Puerto Rican
- Born: Nelson Dieppa-Gerena; February 25, 1971 (age 55) Vieques, Puerto Rico
- Height: 5 ft 4 in (163 cm)
- Weight: Light flyweight

Boxing career
- Reach: 66 in (168 cm)
- Stance: Orthodox

Boxing record
- Total fights: 33
- Wins: 25
- Win by KO: 14
- Losses: 5
- Draws: 2
- No contests: 1
Medal record
Men's Boxing
Representing Puerto Rico
World Amateur Championships
Bronze medal – third place	1991 Sydney	Light Flyweight
Pan American Games
Bronze medal – third place	1991 Havana	Light Flyweight

Nelson Dieppa-Gerena (born February 25, 1971) is a Puerto Rican professional boxer. As an amateur, he represented Puerto Rico in international events including the 1991 World Amateur Boxing Championships, 1991 Pan American Games and the 1992 Summer Olympics. Dieppa debuted as a professional on February 13, 1993, when he defeated Carlos Figueroa. His first world championship fight took place on July 3, 2000, when he lost to Will Grigsby for the World Boxing Organization's light flyweight championship. Following this fight Grigsby tested positive for illegal drugs and the title was declared vacant. Following this fight the title was won by Masibulele Makepula but was stripped again. He won the vacant title on April 14, 2001, in a fight against Andy Tabanas. Dieppa defended the title successfully five times before losing it to Hugo Cázares on April 30, 2005.

== Early life and amateur career ==
Nelson Dieppa was born and raised in Vieques, Puerto Rico. He began his boxing career at a young age. As an amateur Dieppa represented Puerto Rico in international competitions, competing in the Light Flyweight division (– 48 kilograms). In 1991 he represented the island in two major international events. The first one was the World Amateur Boxing Championships, organized in Sydney, Australia from November 15 to 23. In this event he won bronze, finishing in the third global position along Daniel Petrov of Bulgaria. His second international participation of the year was in the Pan American Games that took place on Havana, Cuba. Here he again took bronze, sharing the third position with Fernando Retayud of Colombia. A year later he went on to represent Puerto Rico at the 1992 Olympic Games, held in Barcelona, Spain. These would mark his final participation in an amateur event. Dieppa only participated in one fight in the first round of the Olympic boxing tournament, where he fought against Daniel Petrov. Dieppa lost the fight by points, with a final score of 7-10.

== Professional career ==
Dieppa debuted as a professional on February 13, 1993, when he fought Carlos Figueroa in an event organized at the Roberto Clemente Coliseum. He won the fight by knockout in the first round. His first professional fight in Vieques took place on March 7, 1993, when he knocked out David Almodouvar in the second round. It took Dieppa almost eight months to return to a boxing ring in an official fight. This was his first major lay-off from boxing. He returned, on January 29, 1994, and participated in a boxing card that took place in San Juan, where he defeated Jose Hernandez by unanimous decision. Dieppa's first fight outside of Puerto Rico took place on April 13, 1995, when he fought Hipolito Saucedo, in Las Vegas, Nevada. The contest was scheduled for six rounds and the judges declared it a draw. Following this fight he participated in four fights organized in Ponce and San Juan, winning two by knockout.

On June 1, 1996, Dieppa won his first regional professional championship when he defeated Pablo Tiznado in a card that took place in Miami, Florida. In this fight he won the Fecarbox Flyweight championship, a regional title sanctioned by the World Boxing Council. During this timeframe Dieppa was trained by Félix Trinidad Sr. and was under contract with Don King. Dieppa won three, non-title bouts in a row, including a unanimous decision in eight rounds against Kenny Berrios on June 7, 1997. His next fight was against Carlos Murillo and was held on February 13, 1998, at the University of New Mexico in Albuquerque. The judges awarded Murillo a split decision victory, marking Dieppa's first professional defeat. On October 3, 1998, he returned to activity in a fight against Orlando Malone. Dieppa won the fight by unanimous decision. He participated in three fights between 1999 and early 2000, winning all of them by knockout.

On July 3, 2000, Dieppa had his first world title opportunity. Dieppa fought world champion Will Grigsby for the WBO's world Jr. Flyweight title. Dieppa was declared the winner by unanimous decision at first, but Grigsby tested positive for cocaine after the fight. The WBO declared the fight a no contest and Dieppa was stripped of the championship. Masibulele Makepula of South Africa won the vacant championship but the WBO stripped it and declared it vacant.

=== Winning and defending the WBO title ===
After winning a preparatory fight, Dieppa would fight against Andy Tabanas for the vacant WBO championship. The fight was organized at the Madison Square Garden in New York City. Dieppa won the fight by knockout in the eleventh round. His first title defense took place on September 29, 2001, where he retained his title with a twelve-round unanimous decision over Fahran Sakkreehrin. The end of the fight with Sakkreehin marked the beginning of Dieppa's managerial problems. During this timeframe Félix Trinidad Sr. retired, leaving Dieppa without a trainer. As a consequence Dieppa spent several months inactive. His next fight took place on August 24, 2002, against John Molina. Defending his WBO Jr. Flyweight title for the second time, Dieppa suffered an injury product of accidental headbutt in the second round, which led to the fight being declared a technical draw.

For the next year and a half, Dieppa had a series of problems, including some injuries and ongoing managerial disputes. The World Boxing Organization considered stripping him of the championship, but decided that Dieppa was unable to defend the title due to matters outside of his control. On March 20, 2004, Dieppa participated in his third title defense, against Colombia's Kermin Guardia in a fight held at the Mario Morales coliseum, in Guaynabo, Puerto Rico. Dieppa won by knockout after one minute and fifty-one seconds of the round had passed. Guardia announced his retirement immediately after the fight. Dieppa's next defense took place on July 30, 2004, in a card organized in Louisville, Kentucky, where he fought against Ulises Solís. Dieppa retained the title by a majority decision, with one of the judges scoring the fight 114-114 while the other two gave scorecards of 120-108 in favor of Dieppa.

On January 29, 2005, Dieppa fought against Alex Sánchez in a fight that took place at the Rubén Rodríguez Coliseum, in Bayamón, Puerto Rico. Prior to the fight a number of promotional events were organized. Sanchez had an early advantage in the fight, relying on his boxing skills. In the eleventh round Dieppa won by knockout after connecting a solid combination. This fight was named the fight of the year in Puerto Rico by the local boxing commission.

=== 2005-present ===
On April 30, 2005, Dieppa lost the light flyweight championship against Hugo Cázares. The fight was stopped in the tenth round with Cazares receiving a technical decision victory.

On December 17, 2005, Dieppa returned to action versus Juan Alfonso Keb Baas in an event organized in Fajardo, Puerto Rico. Dieppa won by unanimous decision and won the vacant WBC Continental Americas Jr. Flyweight title. On May 26, 2006, Dieppa fought against Eric Ramírez of Mexico. In this fight he focused on using his boxing skills to counter Ramírez's aggressive style. Dieppa received identical scores of 97-92 from the judges. On March 23, 2007, Dieppa lost by divided decision against Daniel Reyes. Following this fight, Dieppa defeated former champion Alex Sanchez, and lost by unanimous decision to Iván Calderón for the WBO's championship.

== See also ==
- List of Puerto Ricans
- List of Puerto Rican boxing world champions
- List of light-flyweight boxing champions

Achievements
Vacant Title last held by Masibulele Makepula	WBO light flyweight champion April 14, 2001 - April 30, 2005	Succeeded by Hugo Cázares
