= Kissimmee Civic Center =

Multi-purpose facility in Kissimmee, Florida

- Interactive map of Kissimmee Civic Center
- Location: Kissimmee, Florida
- Coordinates: 28°17′34.89″N 81°24′15.13″W
- Owner: City of Kissimmee
- Capacity: 3,100 (Basketball); 3,400 (Boxing); 3,100 (Theatre)

Tenant
- Florida Flight (Continental Basketball League) (2011)

The Kissimmee Civic Center is a multi-purpose facility in Kissimmee, Florida. It has a maximum capacity for basketball of 3,100. It was once home to the Florida Flight of the Continental Basketball League and World Basketball Association.
