= Rey Danseco =

Filipino boxing judge, journalist (b. 1973)

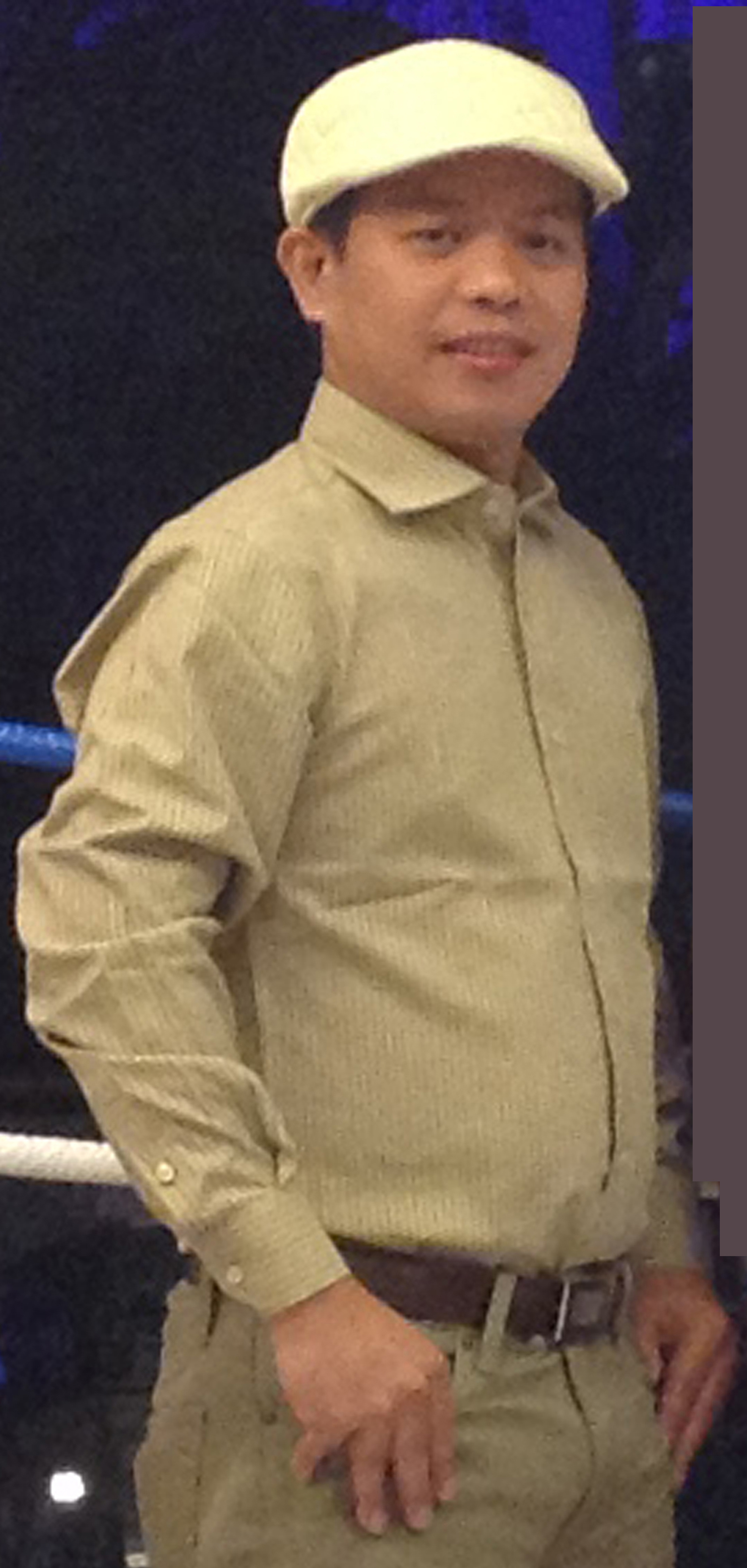
- Rey Danseco in December 2012

World Boxing Council (WBC) Judge of the Year Multiple Philippine Boxing Judge of the Year

Former Contributor/Boxing reporter Philippine Daily Inquirer Manila Times Balita Inquirer Bandera

Former Sports Editor Bagong Tiktik Init sa Balita News Arangkada News

Personal details
- Born: Reynante N. Danseco; January 20, 1973 (age 53) Calauag, Quezon, Philippines
- Education: Polytechnic University of the Philippines (Mass Communication, Bachelor in Journalism); STI College (Associate in Computer Technology)
- Occupation: Journalist and Sports Editor; TV/Radio host Boxing judge Businessman
- Website: www.ilovecalauag.com

Rey Danseco is a Filipino sports editor, journalist, television boxing commentator/host and international boxing judge. He received the Judge of the Year award in 2012 from the World Boxing Council. He was awarded the Harry Gibbs golden plate during the gala night of the 50th WBC Annual Convention at the Grand Oasis Hotel in Cancun, Mexico.

Danseco won the Boxing Judge of the Year award in 2010, 2011 and 2012 in his native Philippines. Those awards were conferred at the Annual Gabriel "Flash" Elorde Memorial Awards and Banquet of Champions in Manila.

== Career ==
=== Beginnings ===
While studying journalism at the Polytechnic University of the Philippines, tycoon John Gokongwei's newspaper editors recognized Danseco's journalistic skills while he was interning at the Bandera Tonight in 1996. After the completion of 150 hours of job training, Editor-in-chief Ariel Borlongan and Sports Editor Danny Ambrocio hired him as a sports writer/reporter. Bandera Tonight closed in 1997 when the Manila Times and Bandera were sold to the Philippine Daily Inquirer. Danseco then joined seasoned writer Eddie Alinea in Balita, one of the oldest Filipino language newspaper under Manila Bulletin, in its old offices along Chino Roces Street (Pasong Tamo Street), Makati City. Danseco was assigned the acting sports editor of both Bandera Tonight and Balita whenever their sports editors were out of town or covering big events.

He was 25 years old when he was hired by Issue Publishing Company in its new newspaper called Init sa Balita, with editorial offices along EDSA near New York Street in Quezon City. The young editor then received the same position at Arangkada newspaper of retired Police General Romeo Maganto where he worked until early 2000. Arangkada had its offices and printing press in Mayon Street, La Loma, Quezon City. In between the two jobs, Danseco was employed as a telemarketer at Ramada Hotel in Manila.

=== Journalist ===
Danseco worked as the sports editor of the Philippines daily newspaper Bagong Tiktik (The New Spy) from 2002 until June 2013. He handled the sports section of Filipino newspapers Init Sa Balita in 1998 and Arangkada until early 2000.

He reported boxing news for Philippine Daily Inquirer from 2003 to 2004 and Manila Times from 2004 to 2006. He contributed as reporter and columnist to Bulgar (Expose), Saksi (Witness), Balita (News) and Bandera.

From 1999 to 2015, Danseco was one of few Filipino boxing reporters who published articles in US-based outlets. He reported for Boxingtalk.com and Boxingscene.com despite the two websites did not pay him a penny. He also published boxing news for Mexico's Suljosblog.com and a former editor of www.boxrec.com.

=== TV and radio ===
Danseco was co-host/commentator/analyst of Elorde television boxing program called Bakbakan sa Elorde. The program aired over RPN 9, IBC 13, and PTV Channel 4 from 1999. He solo-hosted Elorde TV Boxing that was aired by ABC 5 (ESPN5) until late 2006.

When he returned to television, he hosted Elorde Boxing Tour over PTV Channel 4 every 3-4 pm every Saturday from 2008 to 2010.

From 2003 to 2004, Danseco anchored at Sports Radio (918 kHz). He had a weekly one-hour program called Sports Columnist on Air, which included boxing news, commentary and updates.

=== Boxing judge ===
He worked as a judge in international boxing championships in the Philippines, United States, Canada, Japan, Thailand, South Korea, United Kingdom, Australia, Mexico, Russia, and Saudi Arabia. He judged more than 40 world title fights.

Two months after his judging debut, Danseco got his first world title fight assignment on November 27, 2004, when Gerry Penalosa fought and won the vacant WBF (a minor sanctioning body without much recognition) super flyweight championship by way of a KO against unbeaten Bangsaen Sithpraprom of Thailand at Airport Casino Filipino in Paranaque City, Manila. His next judging assignment was his first trip outside his country on June 24, 2007. He judged the Oriental and Pacific Boxing Federation light flyweight title bout that Filipino boxer Juanito Rubillar won over Ken Nakajima in Osaka, Japan. Danseco's first big show to judge was in Mexico City, Mexico under the supervision of then WBC President Jose Sulaiman in June 2008. He judged the all-Mexican North American Boxing Federation super flyweight title fight between unbeaten Adrian Hernandez and Eric Ortiz and the WBC eliminator between Juanito Rubillar and the future world champion Omar Nino Romero.

Danseco judged the world championship fights of some big names in boxing of his generation, such as Canelo Alvarez, Errol Spence Jr. Danny Garcia, Robert Guerrero, Julio César Chávez Jr., Bernard Hopkins, Austin Trout, Gerry Penalosa, Pongsaklek Wonjongkam, Oleydong Sithsamerchai, Badou Jack, Jorge Arce, Jhonny González, Adonis Stevenson, Tony Bellew, Josh Taylor, Toshiaki Nishioka, Shawn Porter, Edgar Sosa, Miguel Berchelt, Leo Santa Cruz, Abner Mares, Amir Khan, Daniel Dubois, Jamel Herring, Jessie Vargas, José Ramírez, Jessica McCaskill, Regis Prograis, Jamel Herring, Khalid Yafai., Ryan Garcia, and Luke Campbell
