= Gilberto Keb Baas =

Mexican boxer

Personal information
- Nickname: Baby Luis V
- Born: Gilberto José Keb Baas; October 21, 1977 (age 48) Hunucmá, Yucatán, Mexico
- Height: 5 ft 2 1/2 in (159 cm)
- Weight: Light flyweight; Flyweight

Boxing career
- Reach: 63 1/2 in (161 cm)
- Stance: Orthodox

Boxing record
- Total fights: 61
- Wins: 35
- Win by KO: 22
- Losses: 22
- Draws: 4

Gilberto José Keb Baas (born October 21, 1977, in Hunucmá, Yucatán, Mexico) is a Mexican professional boxer in the Light Flyweight division. Gilberto is the former WBC Light Flyweight champion.

== Pro career ==
=== WBC Light Flyweight Championship ===
He fought Omar Niño Romero on November 6, 2010, for the WBC light flyweight title at the Poliforum Zamna in Mérida, Yucatán, Mexico. The bout ended with a controversial majority decision in favor of underdog Keb Baas.

In April 2011, he lost his world title to Adrián Hernández.

== Professional boxing record ==
61 fights	35 wins	22 losses
By knockout	22	7
By decision	13	13
By disqualification	0	2
Draws	4	

No.	Result	Record	Opponent	Type	Round, time	Date	Location	Notes
61	Loss	35–22–4	Mario Rodríguez	KO	5 (10)	2012-02-18	Grand Oasis Arena, Cancún, Mexico	
60	Loss	35–21–4	Adrián Hernández	RTD	10 (12)	2011-04-30	Coliseum Don King, Texcoco, Mexico	Lost WBC light-flyweight title
59	Win	35–20–4	José Antonio Aguirre	RTD	8 (12)	2011-02-26	Poliforum Zamna, Mérida, Mexico	Retained WBC light-flyweight title
58	Win	34–20–4	Omar Niño Romero	MD	12 (12)	2010-11-06	Poliforum Zamna, Mérida, Mexico	For WBC light-flyweight title
57	Win	33–20–4	Josue Vega	TKO	8 (12)	2010-09-17	Centro de Cancun, Cancún, Mexico	For vacant WBC FECARBOX light-flyweight title
56	Draw	32–20–4	Juan Esquer	TD	3 (8)	2010-07-30	Moon Palace Resort, Cancún, Mexico	
55	Win	32–20–3	Luis Becerra Estrada	TKO	1 (8)	2010-06-05	El Palenque de la Feria, Pachuca, Mexico	
54	Win	31–20–3	Christian Gomez	KO	2 (8)	2010-03-20	The City Discotheque, Cancún, Mexico	
53	Win	30–20–3	Elfego Hernandez Sierra	TKO	4 (10)	2010-02-20	Poliforum Zamna, Mérida, Mexico	
52	Win	29–20–3	Javier Marquez Clemente	TKO	2 (8)	2009-11-21	Recinto Ferial de Xmatkuil, Mérida, Mexico	
51	Loss	28–20–3	Víctor Zaleta	UD	10 (10)	2009-09-05	Gimnasio Rodrigo M. Quevedo, Chihuahua, Mexico	
50	Draw	28–19–3	Eric Ortiz	SD	6 (6)	2009-06-06	Xcaret Park, Cancún, Mexico	
49	Loss	28–19–2	Víctor Zaleta	KO	3 (12)	2009-03-21	Gimnasio Rodrigo M. Quevedo, Chihuahua, Mexico	
48	Loss	28–18–2	Jesús Jiménez	KO	2 (12)	2008-05-28	Foro Scotiabank, Polanco, Mexico	For Mexican flyweight title
47	Loss	28–17–2	Adrián Hernández	TKO	4 (12)	2008-03-08	Plaza de Toros, Cancún, Mexico	For vacant NABF & WBC International light-flyweight titles
46	Draw	28–16–2	Rodolfo Martínez	PTS	12 (12)	2007-06-16	Convention Centre, Mérida, Mexico	Retained NABF flyweight title
45	Loss	28–16–1	Omar Salado	UD	12 (12)	2007-04-30	El Foro, Tijuana, Mexico	
44	Win	28–15–1	Omar Soto	UD	12 (12)	2006-12-22	Convention Centre, Mérida, Mexico	Won vacant NABF flyweight title
43	Win	27–15–1	Christian Gomez	TKO	3 (12)	2006-10-14	Plaza de Toros, Mérida, Mexico	
42	Loss	26–15–1	Alejandro Hernández	MD	12 (12)	2006-07-15	Cancha Revolucion, Ciudad Del Carmen, Mexico	
41	Loss	26–14–1	Édgar Sosa	UD	12 (12)	2006-03-29	Sindicato de Trabajadores, Mexico City, Mexico	
40	Loss	26–13–1	Pongsaklek Wonjongkam	UD	12 (12)	2006-02-16	Chainart, Thailand	For WBC flyweight title
39	Win	26–12–1	Regulo Gamez	KO	4 (12)	2005-12-17	Complejo Deportivo La Inalámbrica, Mérida, Mexico	Won vacant WBC Continental Americas light-flyweight title
38	Win	25–12–1	Juan de Dios Gomez	UD	10 (10)	2005-10-28	Arena Corona, Mérida, Mexico	
37	Win	24–12–1	Manuel Ruiz	UD	10 (10)	2005-08-05	Kanasín, Mexico	
36	Win	23–12–1	Manuel Ruiz	TKO	7 (10)	2005-05-28	Hunucmá, Mexico	
35	Loss	22–12–1	Marat Mazimbayev	SD	10 (10)	2005-04-15	DIVS, Yekaterinburg, Russia	
34	Loss	22–11–1	Brian Viloria	KO	12 (12)	2004-06-04	Desert Diamond Casino, Tucson, Arizona, U.S.	For NABF flyweight title
33	Win	22–10–1	Miller Valencia	KO	2 (10)	2003-02-01	Arena, Mérida, Mexico	
32	Loss	21–10–1	Manuel Vargas	KO	4 (10)	2002-11-16	Arena México, Mexico City, Mexico	
31	Loss	21–9–1	Paulino Villalobos	UD	10 (10)	2002-08-17	Arena México, Mexico City, Mexico	
30	Win	21–8–1	Vicente Perez	TD	6 (10)	2002-07-19	Convention Centre, Mérida, Mexico	Won UniBox South-Eastern flyweight title
29	Loss	20–8–1	Luis Maldonado	SD	10 (10)	2001-11-16	Mexicali, Mexico	
28	Win	20–7–1	Oscar Andrade	SD	10 (10)	2001-10-05	Mérida, Mexico	
27	Win	19–7–1	Francisco Garcia	UD	10 (10)	2001-06-01	Poliforum Zamna, Mérida, Mexico	
26	Loss	18–7–1	Eric Morel	UD	12 (12)	2000-12-15	Alliant Energy Center, Madison, Wisconsin, U.S.	For WBA flyweight title
25	Win	18–6–1	Melchor Cob Castro	SD	10 (10)	2000-06-23	Poliforum Zamna, Mérida, Mexico	
24	Loss	17–6–1	Oscar Andrade	UD	12 (12)	2000-04-06	Astro Hall, Houston, Texas, U.S.	Lost NABA flyweight title
23	Win	17–5–1	Geronimo Guerra	KO	1 (12)	2000-02-05	Plaza Merida, Mérida, Mexico	Won UniBox flyweight title
22	Win	16–5–1	Tomás Rivera	TD	12 (12)	1999-07-22	Fair Park Auto Building, Dallas, Texas, U.S.	Retained NABA flyweight title
21	Win	15–5–1	Mariano González	PTS	12 (12)	1999-05-06	Laredo, Texas, U.S.	Won vacant NABA flyweight title
20	Win	14–5–1	Alejo Galindo	KO	2 (?)	1999-03-28	Hunucmá, Mexico	
19	Win	13–5–1	Pedro Gutiérrez	TKO	7 (12)	1999-03-26	Plaza de Toros, Mérida, Mexico	For UniBox light-flyweight title
18	Loss	12–5–1	Fernando Luna Velez	DQ	9 (12)	1998-12-05	Mexico City, Mexico	For WBC Continental Americas mini-flyweight title
17	Win	12–4–1	Cipriano Landa	TKO	4 (?)	1998-10-19	Hunucmá, Mexico	
16	Win	11–4–1	Omar Niño Romero	KO	5 (?)	1998-09-26	Mexico City, Mexico	
15	Win	10–4–1	Faustino Miranda	TKO	2 (10)	1998-08-01	Arena México, Mexico City, Mexico	
14	Loss	9–4–1	Cruz Zamora	DQ	6 (10)	1998-07-04	Arena México, Mexico City, Mexico	
13	Loss	9–3–1	Hugo Romero	SD	12 (12)	1998-05-12	Discoteca La Boom, Lomas de Sotelo, Mexico	
12	Draw	9–2–1	Hugo Romero	PTS	10 (10)	1998-03-03	Mexico City, Mexico	
11	Loss	9–2	Juan Bautista	PTS	12 (12)	1998-02-04	Mérida, Mexico	For Yucatán light-flyweight title
10	Win	9–1	Carlos Gonzalez	PTS	10 (10)	1997-12-10	Mexico	
9	Win	8–1	Jose Manuel Perez	KO	8 (?)	1997-10-08	U.S.	
8	Win	7–1	Jose Damian	PTS	10 (10)	1997-08-13	Mérida, Mexico	
7	Win	6–1	Branni Guerrero	TKO	3 (4)	1997-06-18	Mérida, Mexico	
6	Win	5–1	Delio Valencia	KO	2 (?)	1997-05-14	Mérida, Mexico	
5	Win	4–1	Hugo Escobar	KO	2 (?)	1997-03-05	Mérida, Mexico	
4	Loss	3–1	Victor Garcia	PTS	4 (4)	1996-04-17	Mexico City, Mexico	
3	Win	3–0	Rodrigo Garcia	KO	2 (?)	1996-03-20	Mexico City, Mexico	
2	Win	2–0	Tomas Hernandez	PTS	4 (4)	1995-12-23	Mérida, Mexico	
1	Win	1–0	Samuel Chan	TKO	2 (?)	1995-11-18	Mérida, Mexico	

== See also ==
- List of Mexican boxing world champions
- List of world light-flyweight boxing champions

Sporting positions
Regional boxing titles
New title	NABA flyweight champion May 6, 1999 – April 6, 2000	Succeeded by Oscar Andrade
Vacant Title last held by Valentin Leon	WBC Continental Americas light-flyweight Champion; December 17, 2005 – 2006; Vacated	Vacant Title next held by Francisco Soto
Vacant Title last held by Juan Alberto Rosas	NABF flyweight champion December 22, 2006 – 2007; Vacated	Vacant Title next held by Faustino Cupul
Vacant Title last held by Branni Guerrero	WBC FECARBOX light-flyweight Champion; September 17, 2010 – 2010; Vacated	Vacant Title next held by Luis Ceja
World boxing titles
Preceded by Omar Niño Romero	WBC light-flyweight champion November 6, 2010 – April 30, 2011	Succeeded by Adrián Hernández
