= Rodel Mayol =

Filipino boxer

Personal information
- Nicknames: Batang Mandaue; Kid Rapido
- Nationality: Filipino
- Born: Rodel Bryan Generalao Mayol; August 9, 1981 (age 45) Mandaue City, Cebu, Philippines
- Height: 5 ft 4 in (1.63 m)
- Weight: Light Flyweight

Boxing career
- Stance: Orthodox

Boxing record
- Total fights: 39
- Wins: 31
- Win by KO: 22
- Losses: 6
- Draws: 2

Rodel Bryan Generalao Mayol (born August 9, 1981, in Mandaue City, Cebu, Philippines), more commonly known as just Rodel Mayol, is a Filipino former professional boxer and the former WBC Light Flyweight World Champion.

== Early life ==
Mayol is the eldest of five children. At the fifth grade, he once stopped a delinquent, who was 3 years older than he was, with just one punch. He lived with his grandparents for over a decade in Calapayan, Tubod before moving to Mandaue City. He began fighting as an amateur when he was 15 and later won two gold medals at the Palarong Pambansa (National Games). Mayol finally became professional in 2000. When he wasn't boxing, Mayol used to wash cars as well as serving as a ball boy in tennis games.

== Professional career ==
Mayol accumulated a record of 22–0 before losing his first world title bout to WBC minimumweight champion Eagle Den Junlaphan by unanimous decision on May 6, 2006.

On August 4, 2007, Mayol challenged Ulises Solís for the IBF light flyweight title but lost by 8th-round technical knockout. Following the loss to Solis, he fought Adrián Hernández on February 9, 2008, and lost again by 4th-round knockout. On June 13, 2009, he received another shot at a world title against WBO light flyweight champion Iván Calderón. The fight ended in a technical draw after Calderon suffered an accidental headbutt by Mayol. He faced Calderon in a rematch later that year, this time Mayol lost by technical decision after Calderon suffered another unintentional headbutt by Mayol.

On November 21, 2009, he won the WBC light flyweight title by stopping reigning champion Edgar Sosa in two rounds in Mexico. Mayol was docked a point for unintentionally headbutting Sosa in the second round, sending him to the canvas and causing a cut above his cheek. When the action resumed, Mayol dropped Sosa and relentlessly attacked, forcing the referee to stop the fight. Sosa, who required a metal plate to be implanted on his cheekbone due to multiple fractures suffered from the headbutt, filed a protest with the WBC to have the decision changed to a "no contest". However, instead of changing the verdict of the bout in Sosa's favor, the WBC decided to grant the former champion the status of "Champion Emeritus", a position where Sosa will be guaranteed a rematch with Mayol upon recovery or move to the next weight class.

He fought Omar Nino Romero on February 27, 2010, for his first defense of the WBC light flyweight title at the Coliseo Olimpico de la UG in Guadalajara, Jalisco, Mexico. The bout ended with a controversial technical draw after three rounds. Despite receiving a knockdown, Mayol was able to retain his WBC junior flyweight title. Mayol was hit by his opponent with some "low blows.” According to writer Dong Secuya, the referee was going to stop the bout in the 3rd round when Romero fired a hard left that hit the jaw of the momentarily defenseless Mayol who went down almost without consciousness.

On June 19, 2010, Mayol lost his title in a rematch with Romero in San Juan del Rio, Queretaro, Mexico. Mayol had a point deducted in the second round and another point deducted in the fifth round after Romero suffered cuts due to head clashes. Under the WBC's head-clash rule, if a fighter is cut in a clash of heads, the boxer who is not cut automatically has a point taken from his score.

After the loss to Romero, He won 4 straight fights in a row. After the 4th win, He was given a World Title Eliminator. Fighting Julio César Miranda on May 13, 2012, in Ynares Sports Arena, Pasig, Philippines. Mayol sent Miranda to the canvas three times. After 10 rounds, He won the fight by a unanimous decision.

== Post-boxing life ==
After retiring, Mayol started serving as a trainer in Los Angeles, where he is currently based. He has worked as a boxing trainer of Beneil Dariush.

== Professional boxing record ==
39 fights	31 wins	6 losses
By knockout	22	3
By decision	9	3
Draws	2	

No.	Result	Record	Opponent	Type	Round, time	Date	Location	Notes
39	Loss	31–6–2	Juan Carlos Sánchez Jr.	KO	9 (12), 2:55	Sep 22, 2012	Gimnasio Polifuncional, Los Mochis, Mexico	
38	Win	31–5–2	Julio César Miranda	UD	10	May 13, 2012	Yñares Sports Arena, Pasig City, Philippines	
37	Win	30–5–2	Ernie Marquez	TKO	4 (8), 2:43	Oct 27, 2011	San Manuel Indian Casino, Highland, California, US	
36	Win	29–5–2	Jayson Rotoni	UD	10	Aug 6, 2011	Mandaue City Sports and Cultural Complex, Mandaue City, Philippines	
35	Win	28–5–2	Javier Gallo	MD	10	May 7, 2011	MGM Grand, Las Vegas, Nevada, US	
34	Win	27–5–2	Chatri Charoensin	TKO	7 (10), 2:15	Nov 5, 2010	Yñares Sports Arena, Pasig City, Philippines	
33	Loss	26–5–2	Omar Niño Romero	UD	12	Jun 19, 2010	Plaza de Toros, San Juan del Rio, Mexico	Lost WBC light flyweight title
32	Draw	26–4–2	Omar Niño Romero	TD	3 (12), 2:19	Feb 27, 2010	Coliseo Olimpico de la UG, Guadalajara, Mexico	Retained WBC light flyweight title
31	Win	26–4–1	Édgar Sosa	TKO	2 (12), 1:52	Nov 21, 2009	Palenque de la Feria, Tuxtla Gutierrez, Mexico	Won WBC light flyweight title
30	Loss	25–4–1	Iván Calderón	TD	7 (12), 3:00	Sep 12, 2009	Coliseo Jose Miguel Agrelot, Hato Rey, Puerto Rico	For WBO and The Ring light flyweight titles; Split TD after Calderón cut from accidental head clash
29	Draw	25–3–1	Iván Calderón	TD	6 (12), 1:50	Jun 13, 2009	Madison Square Garden, New York City, New York, US	For WBO and The Ring light flyweight titles; Split TD after Calderón cut from accidental head clash
28	Win	25–3	Ardin Diale	TD	7 (12), 1:26	Aug 16, 2008	Puerto Galera, Philippines	Won vacant PGAB light flyweight title
27	Win	24–3	Wisan Banjong	TKO	5 (10), 2:42	May 3, 2008	Cebu Coliseum, Cebu City, Philippines	
26	Loss	23–3	Adrián Hernández	KO	4 (6)	Feb 9, 2008	Domo De La Feria, Leon, Mexico	
25	Loss	23–2	Ulises Solís	TKO	8 (12), 1:13	Aug 4, 2007	Allstate Arena, Rosemont, Illinois, US	For IBF light flyweight title
24	Win	23–1	Masatsugu Okada	KO	1 (8)	Sep 18, 2006	Pacifico, Yokohama, Japan	
23	Loss	22–1	Eagle Kyowa	UD	12	May 6, 2006	Korakuen Hall, Japan	For WBC strawweight title
22	Win	22–0	Lorenzo Trejo	KO	4 (12), 2:29	Jan 28, 2006	Plaza de Toros, Cancun, Mexico	
21	Win	21–0	Takayuki Korogi	UD	12	Apr 4, 2005	Central Gym, Osaka, Japan	Retained OPBF minimumweight title
20	Win	20–0	Marti Polii	TKO	7 (12), 1:33	Jan 29, 2005	PAGCOR Grand Theater, Paranaque City, Philippines	Retained OPBF minimumweight title
19	Win	19–0	La Syukur	KO	3 (10)	Sep 21, 2004	RCTI Studio, Jakarta, Indonesia	
18	Win	18–0	Ernesto Rubillar	TD	7 (12), 1:40	May 21, 2004	NBC Tent, Taguig City, Philippines	Retained OPBF minimumweight title
17	Win	17–0	Julio De la Basez	TKO	8 (10)	Apr 6, 2004	RCTI Studio, Jakarta, Indonesia	
16	Win	16–0	Iwan Key	KO	6 (10)	Mar 16, 2004	RCTI Studio, Jakarta, Indonesia	
15	Win	15–0	Genki Onaka	TKO	1 (12), 2:49	Dec 7, 2003	University Gym, Tokuyama, Japan	Won OPBF minimumweight title
14	Win	14–0	Khamhaeng Phanmee	KO	2 (10), 2:55	Sep 6, 2003	Superdome, Ormoc City, Philippines	
13	Win	13–0	Isidro Lorona	UD	12	Apr 9, 2003	Cantada Sports Center, Taguig City, Philippines	Retained PGAB minimumweight title
12	Win	12–0	Chiochan Buasuwan	TKO	2 (10), 1:38	Dec 14, 2002	Cantada Sports Center, Taguig City, Philippines	
11	Win	11–0	Nino Suelo	UD	12	Aug 3, 2002	Mandaue City Sports and Cultural Complex, Mandaue City, Philippines	Won vacant PGAB minimumweight title
10	Win	10–0	Roger Maldecir	TKO	2 (10), 1:24	Apr 14, 2002	Cantada Sports Center, Taguig City, Philippines	
9	Win	9–0	Billy Payla	TKO	1 (10), 2:29	Dec 22, 2001	Cebu Coliseum, Cebu City, Philippines	
8	Win	8–0	Wicha Phulaikhao	TKO	5 (10), 2:15	Aug 31, 2001	Antipolo City, Philippines	
7	Win	7–0	Julius Agcopra	TKO	4 (10), 2:15	Jun 12, 2001	Gold City Coliseum, Cagayan de Oro City, Philippines	
6	Win	6–0	Jae Ho Kim	TKO	1 (10), 1:16	Mar 31, 2001	Cebu City Waterfront Hotel & Casino, Cebu City, Philippines	
5	Win	5–0	Ken Nakajima	UD	6	Jan 28, 2001	City Sogo Gym, Takasago, Japan	
4	Win	4–0	Al Tarazona	TKO	1 (12), 2:59	Dec 2, 2000	Cebu Coliseum, Cebu City, Philippines	Won Philippine minimumweight title
3	Win	3–0	Allan Llanita	TKO	5 (10), 1:37	Sep 25, 2000	Mandaue City Sports and Cultural Complex, Mandaue City, Philippines	
2	Win	2–0	Jack Comen	TKO	2 (8), 2:25	Aug 26, 2000	Mandaue City, Philippines	
1	Win	1–0	Joseph Villasis	KO	6 (6), 2:58	Jul 1, 2000	Mandaue City, Philippines	

== See also ==
- List of WBC world champions
- List of light flyweight boxing champions

Preceded by Edgar Sosa	WBC Light Flyweight Champion; November 21, 2009 – June 19, 2010	Succeeded by Omar Niño Romero
