= Sisal, Yucatán =

Sisal
- Town
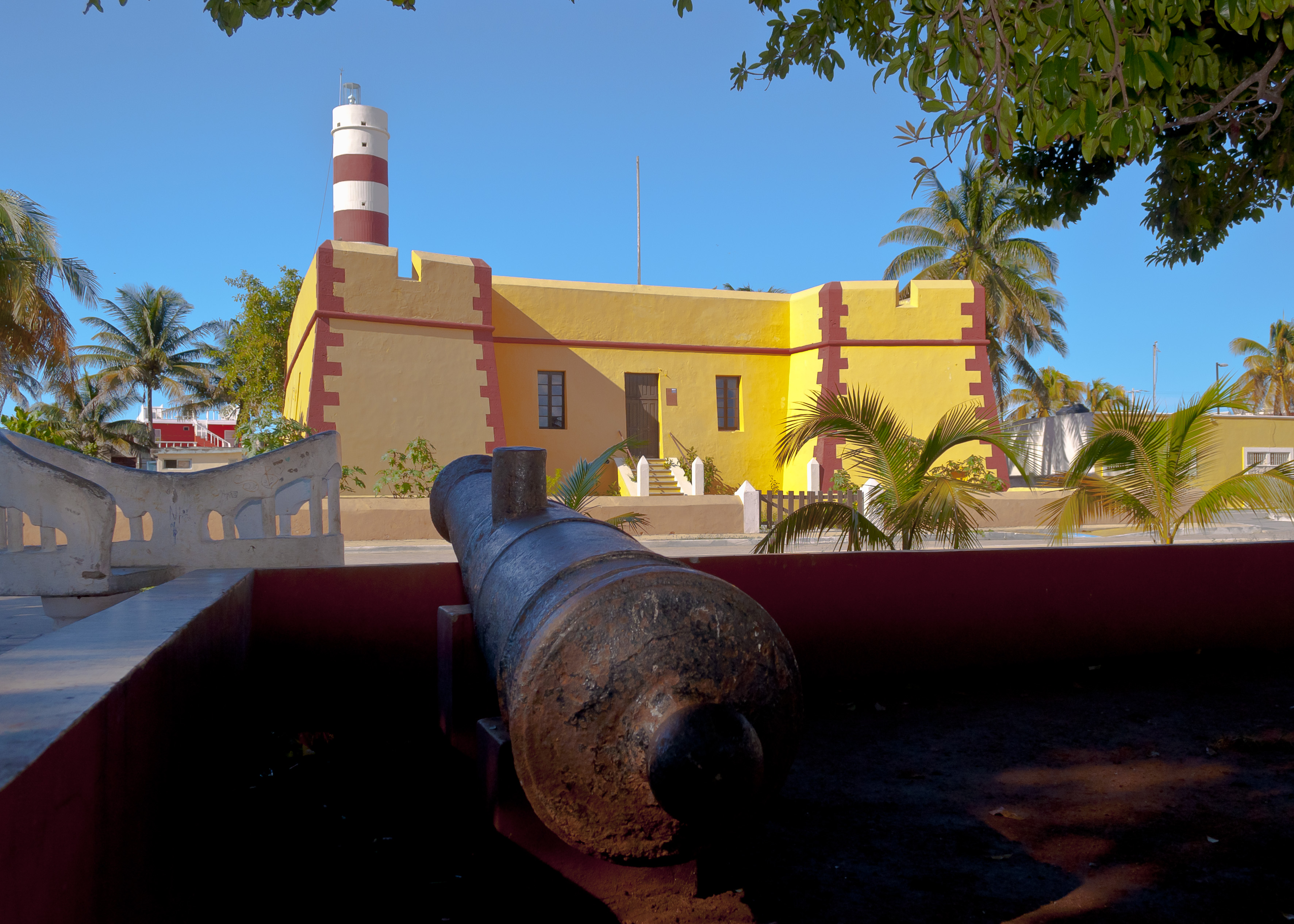

- Location within Yucatán (state) Location within Mexico
- Coordinates: 21°10′0″N 90°02′0″W
- Country: Mexico
- State: Yucatán
- Municipality: Hunucmá
- Mexico Ind.: 1821
- Yucatan Est.: 1824

Population (INEGI, 2010)
  - Total: 1,837
- Time zone: UTC-6 (Central Standard Time)
  - Summer (DST): UTC-5 (Central Daylight Time)
- Major Airport: Merida (Manuel Crescencio Rejón) International Airport
- IATA Code: MID
- ICAO Code: MMMD

Sisal (Spanish pronunciation: [siˈsal]) is a seaport town in Hunucmá Municipality in the state of Yucatán, Mexico. It was the principal port of Yucatán during the henequen boom, later overshadowed when the more modern port of Progreso was built to the east. It lent its name to the agave-derived sisal fiber which was shipped through this port.

The town is about 53 km north north-west of Mérida, the state capital. By law when the Yucatán was part of New Spain, all commerce went through the port of Campeche. The residents of Mérida petititioned for a port closer to the capital, and this was granted by Spanish royal decree on 13 February 1810. The new port of Sisal was founded in 1811, and has a late colonial era fortress, the "Fuerte de Santiago" which incorporates an old lighthouse. After Yucatán's independence from Spain commerce in the port grew rapidly, and by 1845 was shipping cargos with twice the value that had previously gone through Campeche. After the development of Progreso, Sisal's importance declined and today is a small fishing village, visited by some for its beach.

As of the Mexican census of 2010, Sisal had an official population of 1,837 inhabitants. As of December 2006 the state government is working to return this port to the splendor of centuries past through the development of projects focused on tourism as declared then-governor Patricio Patron Laviada. With the planning being done by a U.S. company and to be developed during the next governing term, the port is planned to grow into a tourist destination as well as shelterport for fishermen and tourist vessels.

== History ==
=== Pre-Columbian ===
The ancient groups that inhabited the coasts of the Yucatán peninsula in pre-Hispanic times, were fundamentally related to the villages and the great Mayan ceremonial centers of the inland. There is evidence that shows the journey that these groups made to explore the coasts and trade, salt, fish, fabrics, ceramic utensils and other products.

=== Manor of Ah-Canul ===
In an ancient Mayan document known as the Calkiní Codex the migration of the Canul brothers is narrated and presented in a description of the limits of the Maya province of Lord Ah-Canul of the north, of which Sisal was a part and the origins are mentioned of this port. The oldest quote points out that the Maya priest Ah-Kin Canul had four boats here in which they fished their slaves and probably served for trade with other indigenous populations of the Gulf of Mexico to the Caribbean Sea. This happened during the late post-classic period (1250-1517), when the coasts began to populate, allowing to stand out as one of the main maritime trade ports of the Mayan region.

=== Initial population ===
There are archaeological evidences that reveal the existence of the Maya settlement prior to the Spanish conquest. It is possible that it was a town from another region that established itself here and created alliances with other ports in the area for trade and thus expand its power. It seems that the first settlers arrived at the northeast corner of the Yucatán peninsula around 700 BC. of C. Ethnically, it is believed that they were Mayan groups that already had an advanced socio-cultural organization and an elaborate ceramic tradition. Sisal and other coastal sites in northeastern Yucatán formed parts of the long-distance exchange networks that Chichén Itzá established with the Gulf of Mexico. There were small fishing villages and salt collectors in Chuburná Puerto and Sisal.

=== Occupation in the colonial period ===
The port of Sisal was occupied by the field marshal, Pedro de Ballesteros in 1585. It received the name "Santa María de Zizal", which was granted to it by Fray Diego López de Cogolludo. The name of Sisal comes from the Mayan meaning "Place where the cold is heavy and penetrating". Other meanings attributed to the name of the port are: "Freshness and shade made by large trees" and "son or daughter of a woman". As in the pre-Hispanic era, Sisal had commercial and political importance during the Colony. Here cotton, dye stick, tobacco and scarlet were sold, as well as the Yucatecan henequen that was exported from this port, which is why the agave fiber is called sisal or sisalana in other latitudes.

=== Commercial Importance ===
Sisal was declared a minor port on 3 March 1811. Previously, in 1798, it was granted absolute freedom of rights for direct trade with Spain as in the interior from port to port. Sisal acquired great importance after that appointment, because the Merida trade and the peninsula with Spain and Cuba, was made by this place. The good situation did not last long, due to the poor conditions of the port, in addition to the roads in poor condition that led to Merida, made the transit of goods inadequate. Another disadvantage was the lack of sufficient defenses in the case of being attacked by pirates. Sisal was connected to Mérida by a road of 53 km finished in 1564, but the swamp made the route difficult, unlike Campeche, which finally dominated the communication to the sea. In any case, due to its economic impotence, Sisal was declared a town in 1840, being the seat of the City Council that controlled the Yucatán coast from Celestún to Isla Mujeres. The appointment was proclaimed by Benito Pérez Valdelomar, governor of Yucatán. In the middle of the 18th century, the port of Sisal was already in third place due to the number of its exports, second only to Carmen and Campeche.

=== First colonial constructions ===
Because of the attacks and assaults of pirates, it was necessary to abandon many ports during the second half of the sixteenth century. Sisal did not suffer the same fate thanks to the construction of the Fort of Santiago, whose plans were drawn in 1596 by Juan Miguel Agüero, who completed the construction of the Cathedral of Mérida in 1598. With protection, by 1765 the existence of a peninsular trade between Campeche, Sisal and Mérida, based on beeswax, leather, copal, ebony and dye stick. However, the strong performance of the fort, the commercial activity of Sisal would decline over 150 years, and it has not been possible to recover.

=== Another way ===
Mérida-Sisal was built by Diego de Quijada in the middle of the 18th century, making clear the need that at that time had to enable a port closer to Mérida than that of Campeche, for the export of products from the north of the Peninsula. All kinds of sailboats engaged in foreign trade and cabotage arrived at Sisal: national and foreign banks of more than 100 tons. In the second half of the 19th century, the first steam vessels began to arrive in Sisal, some of much larger tonnage than the big sailing ships. When taking boom, the export of henequen intensified the movement in the port turning Sisal into an important place in commercial navigation. The situation changed in 1844, when the maritime customs office operating in Sisal moved to Progreso, because it was closer to Mérida.

=== Empress visit ===
As the main port of entry to the Yucatán Peninsula, Sisal was a place of historical events: for example, during the Second Mexican Empire, the Empress Carlota de México disembarked during her visit to Yucatán. On 22 November 1865, at eleven and fifty in the morning, anchored in front of the port the national steam "Tabasco", aboard which came the Empress with family and entourage.

In preparation for the visit, the imperial commissioner José Salazar Ilarregui inaugurated the Mérida-Sisal telegraph service on 12 November 1865. This is the first telegraphic line on the Yucatán peninsula, through which the imperial arrival of the Empress was announced.

It is one of the traces of the Empress towards Merida. Masonry columns along the Mérida-Sisal road (called Camino Real), in which the number of each league was engraved in relief. At present some leguaries are still standing. Another commemorative work was on the facade of the customs building, where a marble tombstone was inscribed with the inscription: "The employees of Hacienda de Sisal, to the pleasant memory of the happy arrival to the peninsula of its sovereign the Empress Carlota Amalia, on November 22, 1865".

== Gallery ==
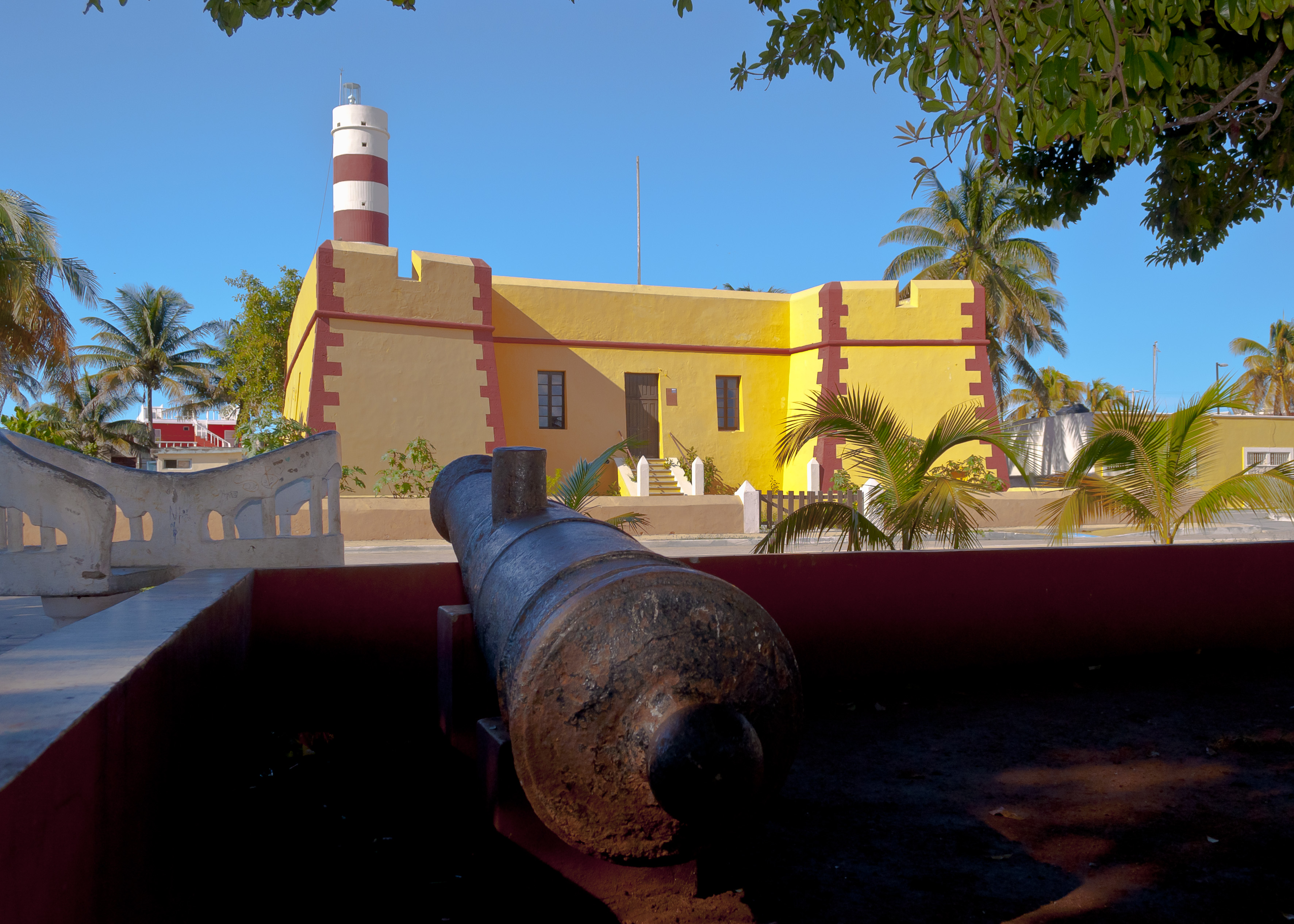
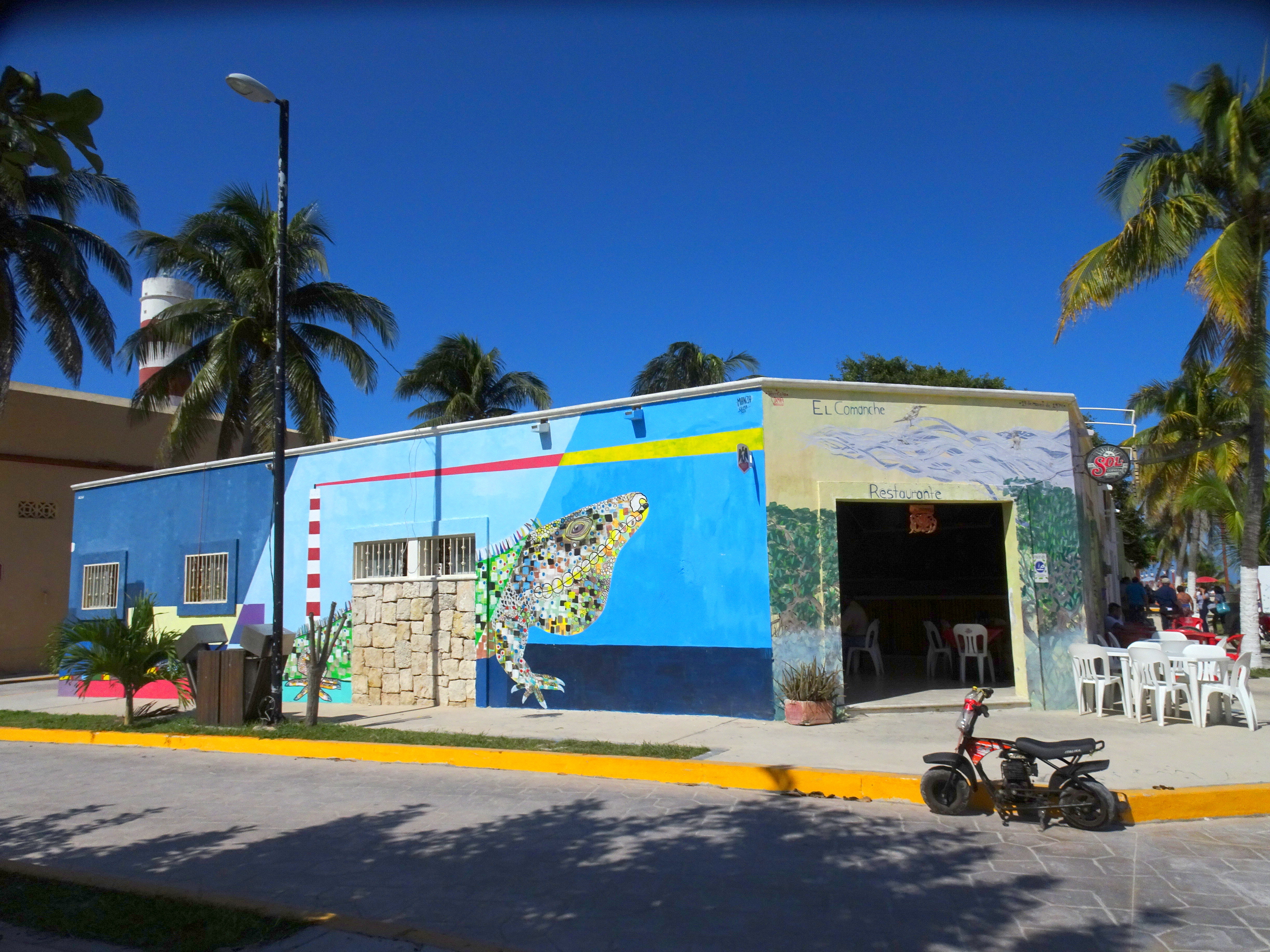
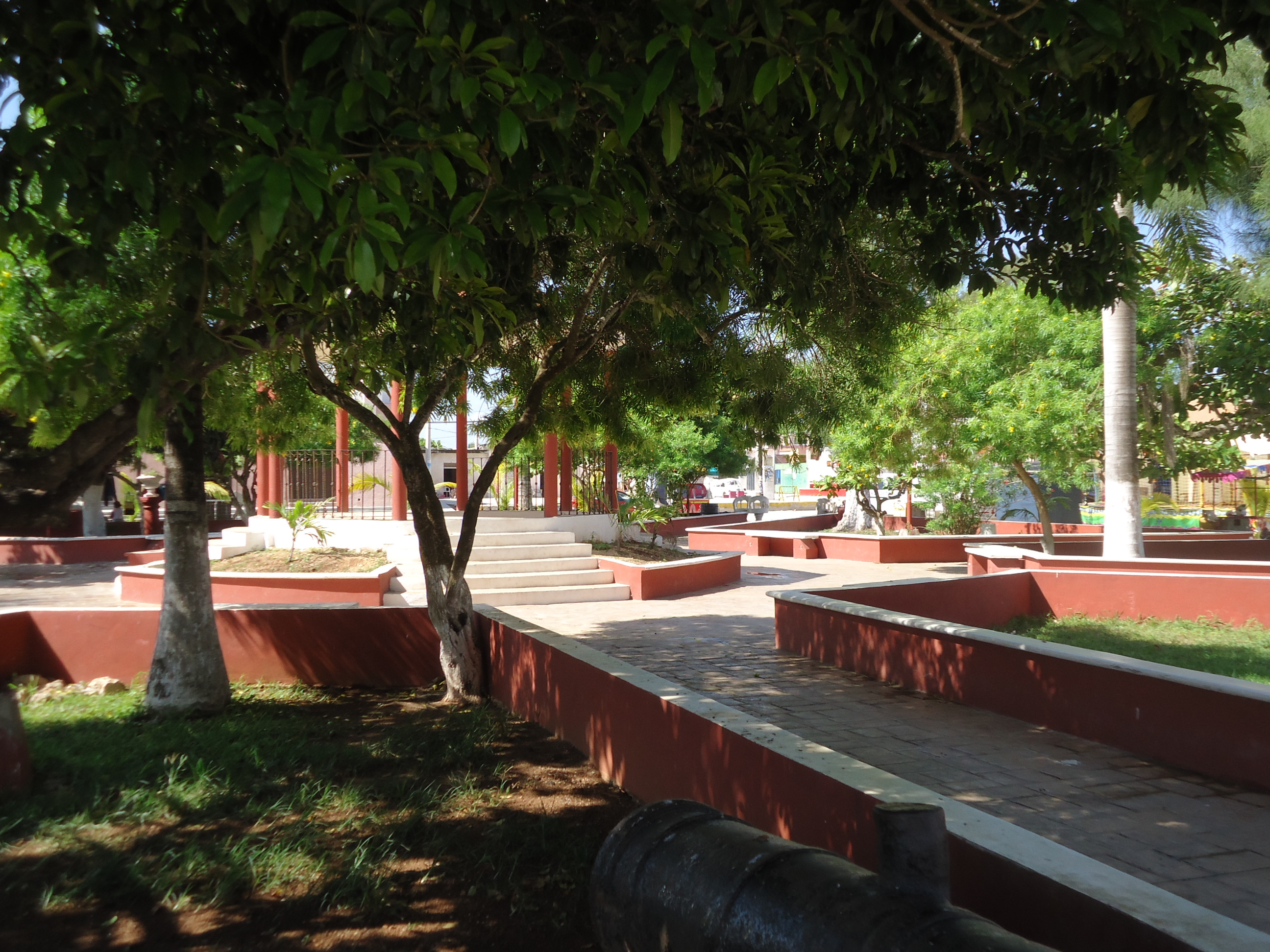

== Demography ==
According to the 2010 census conducted by INEGI, the population of the town was 1837 inhabitants, of whom 940 were men and 897 were women.
