= Dirceu Cabarca =

Panamanian boxer

Personal information
- Born: February 13, 1985 (age 41) Santa Librada, Panama
- Weight: Light flyweight; Super flyweight

Boxing career
- Stance: Southpaw

Boxing record
- Total fights: 28
- Wins: 17
- Win by KO: 6
- Losses: 11

Dirceu Cabarca (born February 13, 1985) is a Panamanian professional boxer who challenged for the WBC light flyweight title in 2013.

== Professional career ==
On January 12, 2013, Cabarca fought Adrián Hernández for the WBC light flyweight title, but lost by twelfth round unanimous decision.

On April 20, 2013, Cabarca defeated Alcides Martinez by twelfth round majority decision to win the WBC FECARBOX light flyweight title.

== Professional boxing record ==
28 fights	17 wins	11 losses
By knockout	6	1
By decision	11	10

No.	Result	Record	Opponent	Type	Round, time	Date	Location	Notes
28	Loss	17–11	(Panama) Gilberto Pedroza	UD	6	Apr 5, 2017	Hotel El Panama, Panama City, Panama	
27	Loss	17–10	(Venezuela) Dionis Martinez	TD	3 (6)	Feb 16, 2017	Hotel El Panama, Panama City, Panama	Unanimous TD after accidental head clash
26	Win	17–9	(Venezuela) Iwier Henriquez	SD	6	May 27, 2016	Hotel El Panama, Panama City, Panama	
25	Win	16–9	(Panama) Ezequiel Asprilla	UD	6	Apr 23, 2015	Atlapa Convention Centre, Panama City, Panama	
24	Loss	15–9	(Panama) Carlos Melo	SD	8	Jan 25, 2014	Gimnasio Los Naranjos, Boquete, Panama	
23	Loss	15–8	(Panama) Edwin Diaz	MD	8	Aug 3, 2013	Roberto Durán Arena, Panama City, Panama	Lost WBC FECARBOX light flyweight title
22	Win	15–7	(Panama) Javier Tello	TKO	5 (8), 2:58	Jun 22, 2013	Gimnasio Los Naranjos, Boquete, Panama	
21	Win	14–7	(Nicaragua) Alcides Martinez	MD	8	Apr 20, 2012	Roberto Durán Arena, Panama City, Panama	Won vacant WBC FECARBOX light flyweight title
20	Loss	13–7	(Mexico) Adrián Hernández	UD	12	Jan 12, 2013	Deportivo Agustín Ramos Millan, Toluca, Mexico	For WBC light flyweight title
19	Win	13–6	(Panama) Johnatan Bravo	TKO	6 (8), 2:24	Oct 25, 2012	Roberto Durán Arena, Panama City, Panama	
18	Win	12–6	(Panama) Manuel Vides	SD	8	Mar 15, 2012	Roberto Durán Arena, Panama City, Panama	Won Panamanian super flyweight title
17	Loss	11–6	(France) Karim Guerfi	UD	6	Oct 22, 2011	Roberto Durán Arena, Panama City, Panama	
16	Win	11–5	(Panama) Ezequiel Asprilla	UD	8	Aug 30, 2011	Hotel Veneto, Panama City, Panama	
15	Win	10–5	(Panama) Jose Luis Calvo	UD	6	Jun 2, 2011	Hotel Veneto, Panama City, Panama	
14	Win	9–5	(Panama) Humberto Pena	UD	6	Mar 15, 2011	Hotel Veneto, Panama City, Panama	
13	Loss	8–5	(Panama) Edwin Diaz	TKO	5 (8), 2:11	Oct 30, 2010	Atlapa Convention Centre, Panama City, Panama	
12	Win	8–4	(Panama) Javier Tello	TKO	3 (8), 2:18	Aug 14, 2010	Roberto Durán Arena, Panama City, Panama	
11	Loss	7–4	(Mexico) Ulises Solís	UD	8	Sep 15, 2009	Plaza de Toros, Cancún, Mexico	
10	Win	7–3	(Panama) Javier Coronado	UD	6	Jul 21, 2009	Atlapa Convention Centre, Panama City, Panama	
9	Loss	6–3	(Panama) Ezequiel Asprilla	UD	6	Feb 19, 2009	Atlapa Convention Centre, Panama City, Panama	
8	Win	6–2	(Panama) Jose Mena	SD	6	Aug 19, 2008	Atlapa Convention Centre, Panama City, Panama	
7	Win	5–2	(Panama) Edwin Diaz	TKO	1 (6), 1:37	Jul 2, 2008	Atlapa Convention Centre, Panama City, Panama	
6	Win	4–2	(Panama) John Jimenez	TKO	3 (4), 1:17	Sep 22, 2007	Gimnasio Roberto Durán, Panama City, Panama	
5	Win	3–2	(Panama) Edgar Gonzalez	TD	3 (4)	Jun 1, 2007	Domo de la Universidad de Panama, Panama City, Panama	Majority TD after accidental head clash
4	Win	2–2	(Panama) John Jimenez	TKO	3 (4), 0:20	Dec 29, 2006	Gimnasio Municipal, Antón, Panama	
3	Loss	1–2	(Panama) Cesar Gaitan	SD	4	Nov 24, 2006	Centro Penitenciario El Renacer, Panama City, Panama	
2	Win	1–1	(Panama) Jose Mena	MD	4	Jul 15, 2006	Gimnasio Municipal, Antón, Panama	
1	Loss	0–1	(Panama) David Paz	UD	4	Jun 10, 2006	Atlapa Convention Centre, Panama City, Panama	

Sporting positions
Regional boxing titles
Preceded by Manuel Vides	Panamanian super flyweight champion March 15, 2012 – October 2012; Vacated	Vacant Title next held by Israel Hidrogo
Vacant Title last held by Odilon Zaleta	WBC FECARBOX light flyweight champion April 20, 2013 – August 3, 2013	Succeeded by Edwin Diaz
