= Víctor Zaleta =

Mexican boxer (born 1984)

Víctor Zaleta Reyes (born May 24, 1984) is a Mexican professional boxer.

== Professional career ==
=== WBO Super Flyweight Championship ===
On February 12, 2011, Zaleta lost the fight against Argentina's Omar Andres Narvaez for the WBO Super Flyweight title by unanimous decision.

== Professional boxing record ==
27 fights	20 wins	6 losses
By knockout	10	3
By decision	10	3
Draws	1	

No.	Result	Record	Opponent	Type	Round, time	Date	Location	Notes
27	Loss	20–6–1	Abel Mendoza	TKO	4 (10), 2:23	20 Nov 2021	Inn Of The Mountain Gods, Mescalaro, New Mexico, U.S.	
26	Loss	20–5–1	Luis Hernández Reyes	UD	6	12 Jul 2019	Foro Villista, Hidalgo del Parral, Mexico	
25	Loss	20–4–1	Carlos Cuadras	TKO	7 (12), 2:33	2 Mar 2013	Gimnasio de las Liebres, Río Bravo, Mexico	For WBC Silver super flyweight title
24	Loss	20–3–1	Léo Santa Cruz	TKO	9 (12), 1:42	10 Nov 2012	Staples Center, Los Angeles, California, U.S.	For IBF bantamweight title
23	Draw	20–2–1	Juan José Montes	SD	12	2 Jun 2012	Coliseo Olimpico de la UG, Guadalajara, Mexico	For WBF (Federation) super flyweight title
22	Win	20–2	Raúl Hidalgo	SD	8	28 Jan 2012	Gimnasio Manuel Bernardo Aguirre, Chihuahua, Mexico	
21	Win	19–2	Arturo Delgado	KO	2 (12), 1:43	24 Sep 2011	Gimnasio Manuel Bernardo Aguirre, Chihuahua, Mexico	
20	Win	18–2	Daniel Noriega	SD	10	7 May 2011	Auditorio Municipal, Torreón, Mexico	
19	Loss	17–2	Omar Narváez	UD	12	12 Feb 2011	Polideportivo Minicipal, Monte Hermoso, Argentina	For WBO super flyweight title
18	Win	17–1	Lowie Bantigue	UD	12	30 Oct 2010	Gimnasio Rodrigo M. Quevedo, Chihuahua, Mexico	
17	Win	16–1	Julio César Cabrera	TKO	3 (10)	21 Aug 2010	The Forum, Irapuato, Mexico	
16	Win	15–1	Juan José Francisco Márquez Solano	UD	10	24 Apr 2010	Arena Chihuahua, Chihuahua, Mexico	
15	Win	14–1	Juan Carlos Jacobo	TKO	1 (8), 1:47	6 Feb 2010	Arena Chihuahua, Chihuahua, Mexico	
14	Win	13–1	Alfredo Montano	TKO	2 (12), 1:38	16 Jan 2010	Centro de Espectáculos Modelo, San Luis Río Colorado, Mexico	
13	Win	12–1	Alejandro Moreno	UD	8	16 Dec 2009	Auditorio Plaza Condesa, Mexico City, Mexico	
12	Win	11–1	Jesús Ricardo Aremnta	TKO	3 (8), 0:31	17 Oct 2009	Gimnasio Municipal "Jose Neri Santos", Ciudad Juárez, Mexico	
11	Win	10–1	Gilberto Keb Baas	UD	10	5 Sep 2009	Gimnasio Rodrigo M. Quevedo, Chihuahua, Mexico	Won vacant WBC FECOMBOX super flyweight title
10	Win	9–1	Javier Márquez Clemente	UD	10	23 May 2009	Arena Monterrey, Monterrey, Mexico	
9	Win	8–1	Gilberto Keb Baas	KO	3 (12), 2:00	21 Mar 2009	Gimnasio Rodrigo M. Quevedo, Chihuahua, Mexico	
8	Win	7–1	Oscar Arciniega	TKO	4 (8), 2:32	1 Nov 2008	Gimnasio Manuel Bernardo Aguirre, Chihuahua, Mexico	
7	Loss	6–1	Faustino Cupul	MD	10	27 Sep 2008	Centro de Convenciones Siglo XXI, Mérida, Mexico	For WBC-NABF flyweight title
6	Win	6–0	José Antonio Aguirre	UD	10	24 May 2008	La Feria de Santa Rita, Chihuahua, Mexico	
5	Win	5–0	José Alberto Cuadros	UD	10	29 Feb 2008	Gimnasio Rodrigo M. Quevedo, Chihuahua, Mexico	
4	Win	4–0	José Antonio González	KO	2 (8), 1:30	14 Dec 2007	Poliforo Juan Gabriel, Ciudad Juárez, Mexico	
3	Win	3–0	Eric Ortiz	TKO	6 (10), 2:32	29 Sep 2007	Gimnasio Rodrigo M. Quevedo, Chihuahua, Mexico	
2	Win	2–0	Alejandro Moreno	PTS	8	13 Jul 2007	Gimnasio Rodrigo M. Quevedo, Chihuahua, Mexico	
1	Win	1–0	Alejandro Sosa	KO	3 (4), 0:58	28 Apr 2007	Gimnasio Rodrigo M. Quevedo, Chihuahua, Mexico	
