= Yader Cardoza =

Nicaraguan boxer

Personal information
- Born: Yader Jose Nunez Cardoza; February 22, 1989 (age 37) Ciudad Sandino, Nicaragua
- Weight: Light flyweight; Super flyweight

Boxing career
- Stance: Orthodox

Boxing record
- Total fights: 43
- Wins: 25
- Win by KO: 8
- Losses: 17
- Draws: 1

Yader Cardoza (born February 22, 1989) is a Nicaraguan professional boxer who challenged for the WBC light flyweight title in 2013.

== Professional career ==
=== Cardoza vs. Hernández ===
Cardoza won the vacant WBC Latino light flyweight title on November 24, 2012, with a unanimous decision (UD) win over Jose Aguilar. After retaining the title by defeating Eliecer Quezada, Cardoza challenged WBC world champion Adrián Hernández on May 11, 2013. Despite a determined display from Cardoza where he managed to swell Hernández's eye, Hernández defeated Cardoza by UD, retaining his title.

== Professional boxing record ==
42 fights	24 wins	17 losses
By knockout	8	6
By decision	16	11
Draws	1	

No.	Result	Record	Opponent	Type	Round, time	Date	Location	Notes
42	Loss	24–17–1	Alexander Espinoza	MD	8	Nov 27, 2021	Puerto Salvador Allende, Managua, Nicaragua	
41	Loss	24–16–1	Aron Juarez	SD	8	Mar 14, 2020	Plaza Los Cabros, Ciudad Sandino, Nicaragua	
40	Win	24–15–1	Alexander Taylor	TKO	3 (8), 1:29	Apr 13, 2019	Plaza Los Cabros, Ciudad Sandino, Nicaragua	
39	Loss	23–15–1	Ricardo Blandon	RTD	7 (10), 3:00	Nov 17, 2018	Nuevo Gimnasio Nicarao, Managua, Nicaragua	For vacant WBC Latino super flyweight title
38	Loss	23–14–1	Miguel Gonzalez	UD	11	Sep 22, 2018	Gran Arena Monticello, Mostazal, Chile	For WBA Fedelatin super flyweight title
37	Loss	23–13–1	Alexander Espinoza	UD	10	May 12, 2018	Nuevo Gimnasio Nicarao, Managua, Nicaragua	
36	Win	23–12–1	Leandro Mendoza	KO	1 (8), 1:26	Sep 16, 2017	Cancha Municipal de Nagarote, León, Nicaragua	
35	Loss	22–12–1	Mikhail Aloyan	UD	10	May 11, 2017	Kemerovo Arena, Kemerovo, Russia	For vacant WBA East Asia super flyweight title
34	Loss	22–11–1	Jamie Conlan	SD	12	Mar 10, 2017	Waterfront Hall, Belfast, Northern Ireland	For vacant WBC Silver International super flyweight title
33	Win	22–10–1	Alexander Taylor	UD	8	Jan 28, 2017	Casino Nicaraos, Managua, Nicaragua	
32	Loss	21–10–1	Felix Alvarado	UD	8	Dec 16, 2016	Puerto Salvador Allende, Ciudad Sandino, Nicaragua	
31	Win	21–9–1	Martin Diaz	UD	8	Oct 29, 2016	Plaza los Cabros, Managua, Nicaragua	
30	Loss	20–9–1	Felipe Orucuta	TKO	4 (10), 1:57	Sep 3, 2016	Deportivo Zaragoza, Atizapan de Zaragoza, Mexico	
29	Win	20–8–1	Lenin Trana	TKO	5 (8), 2:00	Mar 19, 2016	Puerto Salvador Allende, Managua, Nicaragua	
28	Win	19–8–1	Jose Cordero	MD	8	Jan 30, 2016	Cancha Municipal de Dolores, Carazo, Nicaragua	
27	Loss	18–8–1	Felix Alvarado	TKO	5 (8), 1:50	Dec 19, 2015	Puerto Salvador Allende, Managua, Nicaragua	
26	Win	18–7–1	Jose Ruiz	UD	6	Nov 14, 2015	Hotel Xolotlan, Managua, Nicaragua	
25	Win	17–7–1	Wesling Polanco	UD	6	Oct 31, 2015	Gimnasio Rosendo Alvarez, Managua, Nicaragua	
24	Win	16–7–1	Alexander Taylor	UD	10	Jul 31, 2015	Gimnasio Multiusos del IND, Managua, Nicaragua	
23	Draw	15–7–1	Wesling Polanco	TD	4 (6), 1:57	May 23, 2015	Gimnasio Alexis Arguello, Managua, Nicaragua	Majority TD after Cardoza cut from accidental head clash
22	Loss	15–7	Cristofer Rosales	KO	1 (8), 1:10	Sep 26, 2014	Centro de Convenciones Hotel Hex, Managua, Nicaragua	
21	Loss	15–6	Keyvin Lara	MD	6	May 31, 2014	Centro Recreativo de la Alcaldia, Carazo, Nicaragua	
20	Loss	15–5	Adrián Hernández	UD	12	May 11, 2013	Deportivo Agustín Ramos Millan, Toluca, Mexico	For WBC light flyweight title
19	Win	15–4	Eliecer Quezada	RTD	5 (12), 0:10	Mar 16, 2013	Plaza Los Cabros, Ciudad Sandino, Nicaragua	Retained WBC Latino light flyweight title
18	Win	14–4	Jose Aguilar	UD	10	Nov 24, 2012	Gimnasio Alexis Arguello, Managua, Nicaragua	Won vacant WBC Latino light flyweight title
17	Win	13–4	Jose Aguilar	UD	10	Jul 28, 2012	Gimnasio Alexis Arguello, Managua, Nicaragua	
16	Win	12–4	Miguel Tellez	UD	6	Mar 31, 2012	Casino Princess, Managua, Nicaragua	
15	Win	11–4	Johnson Tellez	UD	6	Feb 4, 2012	Gimnasio Alexis Arguello, Managua, Nicaragua	
14	Win	10–4	Benjamin Mendoza	UD	6	Dec 10, 2011	Gimnasio Alexis Arguello, Managua, Nicaragua	
13	Win	9–4	Luis Solorzano	TKO	2 (4)	Nov 26, 2011	Gimnasio German Pomares, Estelí, Nicaragua	
12	Loss	8–4	Eliecer Quezada	UD	8	Jun 25, 2011	Gimnasio Alexis Arguello, Managua, Nicaragua	
11	Win	8–3	Herald Molina	MD	4	Mar 26, 2011	Gimnasio Alexis Arguello, Managua, Nicaragua	
10	Win	7–3	Nestor Maradiaga	TKO	3 (6), 2:34	Feb 12, 2011	Gimnasio Alexis Arguello, Managua, Nicaragua	
9	Win	6–3	Hector Elizabeth	UD	6	Nov 13, 2010	Puerto Salvador Allende, Managua, Nicaragua	
8	Win	5–3	Rusbell Jarquin	UD	6	Sep 4, 2010	Gimnasio Alexis Arguello, Managua, Nicaragua	
7	Win	4–3	Jose Aguilar	UD	6	Jul 30, 2010	Gimnasio Alexis Arguello, Managua, Nicaragua	
6	Win	3–3	Josue Acuna	UD	4	Jun 26, 2010	Gimnasio Alexis Arguello, Managua, Nicaragua	
5	Loss	2–3	Felix Alvarado	KO	3 (4), 1:17	Apr 24, 2010	Cancha de la Alcaldia, Isla de Ometepe, Nicaragua	
4	Loss	2–2	Eliecer Quezada	UD	4	Feb 27, 2010	Gimnasio Alexis Arguello, Managua, Nicaragua	
3	Loss	2–1	Rusbell Jarquin	TKO	4 (4), 1:35	Aug 22, 2009	Polideportivo El Brigadista, Matagalpa, Nicaragua	
2	Win	2–0	Jose Aguilar	KO	1 (4), 3:00	Jul 4, 2009	Gimnasio Rosendo Alvarez, Ciudad Sandino, Nicaragua	
1	Win	1–0	David Herrera	TKO	4 (4), 1:50	Apr 4, 2009	Bar Cachiro, Ciudad Sandino, Nicaragua	

Sporting positions
Regional boxing titles
Vacant Title last held by Luis Alberto Rios	WBC Latino light flyweight champion Nov 24, 2012 - May 11, 2013; Lost bid for world title	Vacant Title next held by Mercedes Concepcion
