= Omar Niño Romero =

Mexican boxer (born 1976)

Personal information
- Nickname: Giant Killer
- Born: 12 May 1976 (age 50) Guadalajara, Jalisco, Mexico
- Height: 5 ft 3 in (160 cm)
- Weight: Light flyweight; Flyweight

Boxing career
- Reach: 64 1/2 in (164 cm)
- Stance: Orthodox

Boxing record
- Total fights: 41
- Wins: 32
- Win by KO: 13
- Losses: 6
- Draws: 2
- No contests: 1

Omar Niño Romero (born 12 May 1976) is a Mexican former professional boxer who competed from 1995 to 2016. He held the WBC light flyweight title in 2010.

== Professional career ==
Known as "Giant Killer", he is the former WBC Light Flyweight Champion, defeating Brian Viloria in a major upset in August 2006 for the title. In his next fight, Niño Romero fought Viloria in a rematch to a majority draw decision and a retention of his title on November 18, 2006 in Las Vegas, Nevada. The win was marred with controversy, as Niño allegedly tested positive for methamphetamine in his post-fight urinalysis following the bout with Viloria. Ultimately, he was stripped of his title in February 2007, and suspended for nine months and fined by the Nevada State Athletic Commission the following month.

He fought Rodel Mayol on February 27, 2010, in Mayol's first defense of the WBC light flyweight title at the Coliseo Olimpico de la UG in Guadalajara, Jalisco, Mexico. The bout ended with a controversial technical draw after three rounds. Despite being knocked down and out, Mayol was able to retain his WBC junior flyweight title. Mayol was hit by Romero with some "low blows.” and followed these punches with a punch to the head.

== Professional boxing record ==
| 41 fights | 32 wins | 6 losses |
|---|---|---|
| By knockout | 13 | 4 |
| By decision | 18 | 2 |
| By disqualification | 1 | 0 |
| Draws | 2 | |
| No contests | 1 | |

| No. | Result | Record | Opponent | Type | Round, time | Date | Location | Notes |
|---|---|---|---|---|---|---|---|---|
| 41 | Loss | 32–6–2 (1) | Juan Hernández | KO | 2 (10) | 2016-06-11 | Arena Coliseo, Mexico City, Mexico | |
| 40 | Win | 32–5–2 (1) | Elfego Hernandez Sierra | UD | 10 (10) | 2015-05-30 | Atemajac Plaza, Zapopan, Mexico | |
| 39 | Loss | 31–5–2 (1) | Brian Viloria | TKO | 9 (12) | 2012-05-13 | Ynares Sports Arena, Pasig, Philippines | For WBO flyweight title |
| 38 | Win | 31–4–2 (1) | Javier Marquez Clemente | TKO | 3 (10) | 2012-02-23 | Municipio, Tepeji, Mexico | |
| 37 | Loss | 30–4–2 (1) | Gilberto Keb Baas | MD | 12 (12) | 2010-11-06 | Poliforum Zamna, Mérida, Mexico | Lost WBC light-flyweight title |
| 36 | Win | 30–3–2 (1) | Ronald Barrera | RTD | 6 (12) | 2010-09-04 | Coliseo Olimpico de la U.G., Guadalajara, Mexico | Retained WBC light-flyweight title |
| 35 | Win | 29–3–2 (1) | Rodel Mayol | UD | 12 (12) | 2010-06-19 | Plaza de Toros, San Juan del Río, Mexico | Won WBC light-flyweight title |
| 34 | Draw | 28–3–2 (1) | Rodel Mayol | TD | 3 (12) | 2010-02-27 | Coliseo Olimpico de la U.G., Guadalajara, Mexico | For WBC light-flyweight title |
| 33 | Win | 28–3–1 (1) | Juanito Rubillar | TD | 8 (12) | 2009-06-06 | Xcaret Park, Cancún, Mexico | |
| 32 | Win | 27–3–1 (1) | Sammy Gutiérrez | UD | 10 (10) | 2008-12-06 | Palenque Calle 2, Zapopan, Mexico | |
| 31 | Win | 26–3–1 (1) | Francisco Soto | UD | 10 (10) | 2008-10-04 | Coliseo Olimpico de la U.G., Guadalajara, Mexico | |
| 30 | Loss | 25–3–1 (1) | Juanito Rubillar | SD | 12 (12) | 2008-06-14 | Palacio de los Deportes, Mexico City, Mexico | |
| 29 | NC | 25–2–1 (1) | Brian Viloria | ND | 12 (12) | 2006-11-18 | Thomas & Mack Center, Paradise, Nevada, U.S. | WBC light-flyweight title at stake; Originally ruled a majority draw, later ruled an NC after Romero failed a drug test |
| 28 | Win | 25–2–1 | Brian Viloria | UD | 12 (12) | 2006-08-10 | The Orleans, Paradise, Nevada, U.S. | Won WBC light-flyweight title |
| 27 | Win | 24–2–1 | Martín Zepeda | UD | 10 (10) | 2006-05-19 | Arena Coliseo, Guadalajara, Mexico | |
| 26 | Win | 23–2–1 | Juan de Dios Gomez | UD | 10 (10) | 2005-06-17 | Arena Coliseo, Guadalajara, Mexico | |
| 25 | Win | 22–2–1 | Carlos Bouchan | UD | 10 (10) | 2005-02-25 | Arena Coliseo, Guadalajara, Mexico | |
| 24 | Win | 21–2–1 | Keyri Wong | TKO | 6 (10) | 2004-12-17 | Arena Coliseo, Guadalajara, Mexico | |
| 23 | Win | 20–2–1 | Cruz Molina | KO | 2 (10) | 2004-09-24 | Arena Coliseo, Guadalajara, Mexico | |
| 22 | Loss | 19–2–1 | Juan Alberto Rosas | KO | 9 (?) | 2004-02-21 | Tepic, Mexico | |
| 21 | Win | 19–1–1 | Salvador Rosales | UD | 10 (10) | 2003-07-12 | Arena Jalisco, Guadalajara, Mexico | |
| 20 | Win | 18–1–1 | Édgar Sosa | UD | 10 (10) | 2002-10-19 | Arena México, Mexico City, Mexico | |
| 19 | Draw | 17–1–1 | Rafael Orozco | TD | 3 (12) | 2002-02-08 | Guadalajara, Mexico | |
| 18 | Win | 17–1 | Alejandro Sosa | TKO | 3 (12) | 2001-10-19 | Guadalajara, Mexico | Won vacant WBA Fedecaribe light-flyweight title |
| 17 | Win | 16–1 | Javier Angeles | KO | 1 (10) | 2001-06-29 | Arena Coliseo, Guadalajara, Mexico | |
| 16 | Win | 15–1 | Alejandro Padilla | KO | 2 (?) | 1999-12-10 | Mexico | |
| 15 | Loss | 14–1 | Gilberto Keb Baas | KO | 5 (?) | 1998-09-26 | Mexico City, Mexico | |
| 14 | Win | 14–0 | Jesus Vargas | DQ | ? (?) | 1998-07-17 | Ciudad Obregón, Mexico | |
| 13 | Win | 13–0 | Alejandro Garcia | TKO | 5 (?) | 1998-06-13 | Arena Coliseo, Mexico City, Mexico | |
| 12 | Win | 12–0 | Adrian Nieto | TKO | 1 (?) | 1998-04-11 | Mexico City, Mexico | |
| 11 | Win | 11–0 | Gustavo Andrade | PTS | 10 (10) | 1997-12-05 | Guadalajara, Mexico | For Yucatán light-flyweight title |
| 10 | Win | 10–0 | Gustavo Andrade | PTS | 6 (6) | 1997-08-15 | Guadalajara, Mexico | |
| 9 | Win | 9–0 | Martin Acevedo | PTS | 8 (8) | 1997-03-07 | Guadalajara, Mexico | |
| 8 | Win | 8–0 | Faustino Miranda | PTS | 6 (6) | 1997-01-31 | Mexico | |
| 7 | Win | 7–0 | Juan Rodriguez | KO | 2 (?) | 1996-10-18 | Guadalajara, Mexico | |
| 6 | Win | 6–0 | Martin Armenta Chaparro | TKO | 1 (?) | 1996-07-12 | Guadalajara, Mexico | |
| 5 | Win | 5–0 | Jorge Arce | TKO | 1 (?) | 1996-06-21 | Guadalajara, Mexico | |
| 4 | Win | 4–0 | Ricardo Barajas | PTS | 4 (4) | 1996-03-01 | Arena Coliseo, Guadalajara, Mexico | |
| 3 | Win | 3–0 | Juan Rodriguez | PTS | 4 (4) | 1996-02-02 | Guadalajara, Mexico | |
| 2 | Win | 2–0 | Gerardo Espinoza | PTS | 4 (4) | 1995-07-07 | Mexico | |
| 1 | Win | 1–0 | Florentino Garcia | KO | 1 (4) | 1995-05-13 | Mexico | |

== See also ==
- List of Mexican boxing world champions
- List of world light-flyweight boxing champions

Sporting positions
Regional boxing titles
| New title | WBA Fedecaribe light-flyweight Champion; October 19, 2001 – 2002; Vacated | Vacant Title next held by Nerys Espinoza |
World boxing titles
| Preceded by Brian Viloria | WBC light-flyweight champion August 10, 2006 – February 1, 2007; Stripped | Vacant Title next held by Édgar Sosa |
| Preceded by Rodel Mayol | WBC light-flyweight champion June 19, 2010 – November 6, 2010 | Succeeded by Gilberto Keb Baas |
