= Hunucmá Municipality =

Municipality in the Mexican state of Yucatán

Hunucmá
- Municipality
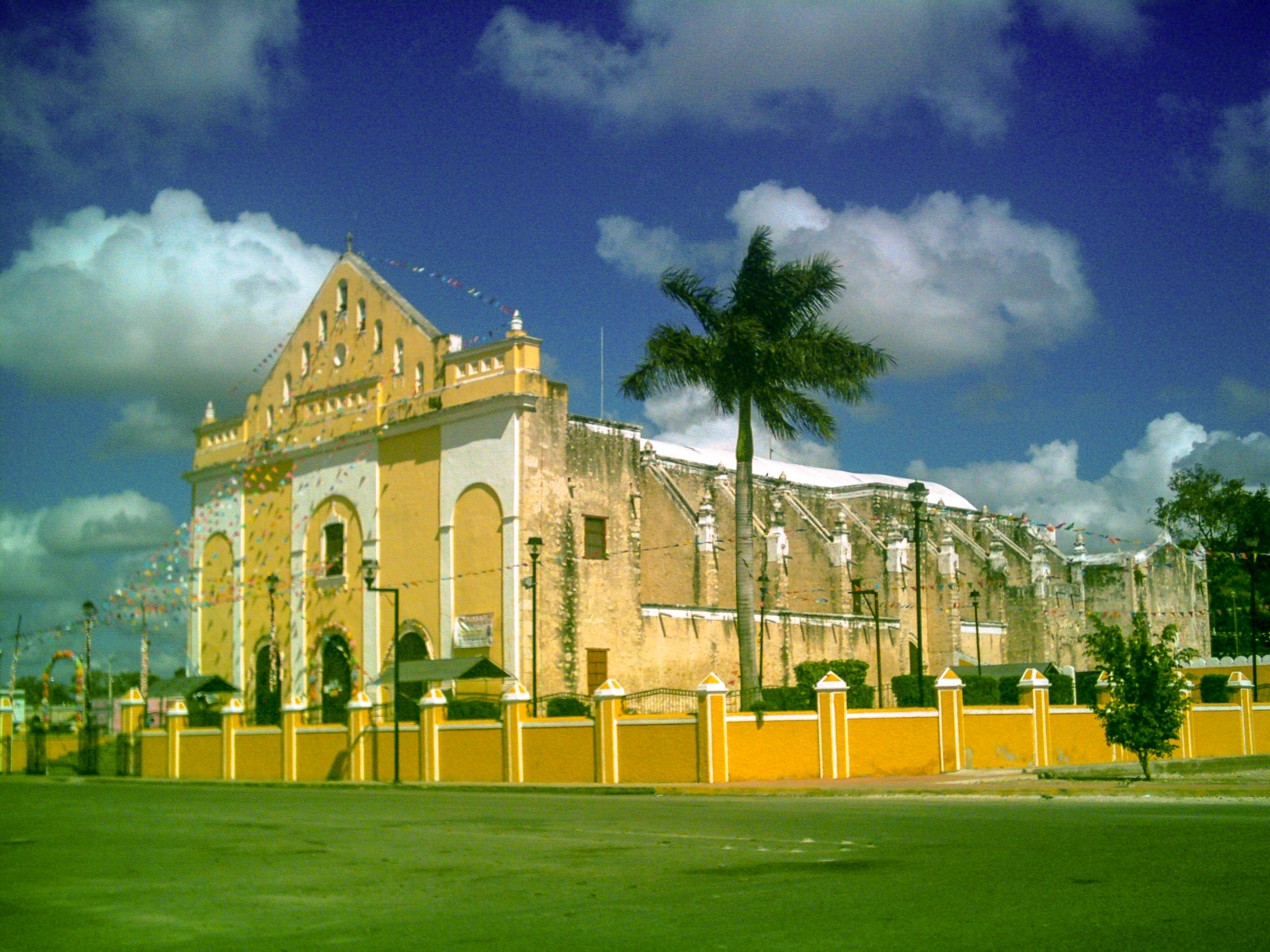
- Principal Church of Hunucmá, Yucatán

- Coat of arms

- Region 1 Poniente #038

- Location of the Municipality in Mexico
- Coordinates: 21°01′05″N 89°52′31″W
- Country: Mexico
- State: Yucatán
- Mexico Ind.: 1821
- Yucatan Est.: 1824
- Municipality Est.: 1900

Government
  - Type: 2012–2015
  - Municipal President: Delio Jaime Perez Tzab

Area
  - Total: 599.10 km^{2} (231.31 sq mi)
- Elevation: 8 m (26 ft)

Population (2010)
  - Total: 30,731
  - Demonym: Hunucmeño
- Time zone: UTC-6 (Central Standard Time)
- Postal Code: 97355
- INEGI Code: 038
- Major Airport: Merida (Manuel Crescencio Rejón) International Airport
- IATA Code: MID
- ICAO Code: MMMD

Hunucmá Municipality (Spanish pronunciation: [xu.nuɣˈma], in the Yucatec Maya language: “he alone answered”) is a municipality in the Mexican state of Yucatán containing 599.10 km^{2} of land and located roughly 25 km west of the city of Mérida.

== History ==
It is unknown which chieftainship the area was under prior to the arrival of the Spanish. After the conquest the area became part of the encomienda system. The encomienda was established under Francisco de Montejo the Younger in 1549 and by 1571 it had passed to Beatriz de Montejo. In 1579, the encomendero was Diego de Santillán and in 1607 it passed to Martín de Palomar. In 1616 the encomenderos were Diego García de Montalvo, Jacinto de Montalvo y Olmos, and Martín de Montalvo y Figueroa, but by 1678 it had passed to Diego Tello de Aguillar.

Yucatán declared its independence from the Spanish Crown in 1821 and in 1825, the area was assigned to the Camino Real Bajo region with its headquarters in Hunucmá Municipality, which was head of Chocholá, Halachó, Kinchil, Kopomá, Maxcanú, Opichén, Samahil, Tetiz, and Umán. After the ejidos and land redistribution of the 1930s, Hunucmá was reconfirmed as head of its own municipality.

== Governance ==
The municipal president is elected for a three-year term. The town council has nine councilpersons, who serve as Secretary and councilors of public lighting, public security, education and culture, parks and gardens, public works, cemeteries and roads, markets, potable water, and sports.

The Municipal Council administers the business of the municipality. It is responsible for budgeting and expenditures and producing all required reports for all branches of the municipal administration. Annually it determines educational standards for schools.

The Police Commissioners ensure public order and safety. They are tasked with enforcing regulations, distributing materials and administering rulings of general compliance issued by the council.

== Communities ==
The head of the municipality is Hunucmá, Yucatán. The other populated areas of the municipality include Capel, Rancho Chen Toro, Hulila, Hunkanab, Rancho Chico, San Antonio Chél, Rancho San Joaquín, San Miguel, Rancho San Rafael, Santa Cruz, Sisal, Texán de Palomeque. The significant populations are shown below:

Community	Population
Entire Municipality (2010)	30,731
Hunkanab	448 in 2005
Hunucmá	22,800 in 2005
San Antonio Chel	206 in 2005
Sisal	1672 in 2005
Texan de Palomeque	2937 in 2005

== Local festivals ==
Every year from 10 to 15 August there is a festival of the Virgin of the Assumption; on 28 to 31 January, the feast of Corpus Christi is celebrated; and the last week of August, in Sisal is a celebration in honor of the Christ of Hunucmá.

== Tourist attractions ==
- Church of St. James, built in the seventeenth century
- Chapel of San Antonio, built in the colonial era
- the former Convent and Church of San Francisco, built in the sixteenth century
- Chapel of Guadalupe, dating from the eighteenth century
- Hacienda San Miguel Chac

== Notables ==
Notable locals include: Jose Leon Bojorquez, musician, composer and director of the Folk Orchestra of the State and Tipica de Yucalpetén.

Alberto Bojórquez Pérez Perez Alberto Bojorquez, Promoting tourism and the peninsula.
