= Hunucmá =

- Municipal Seat
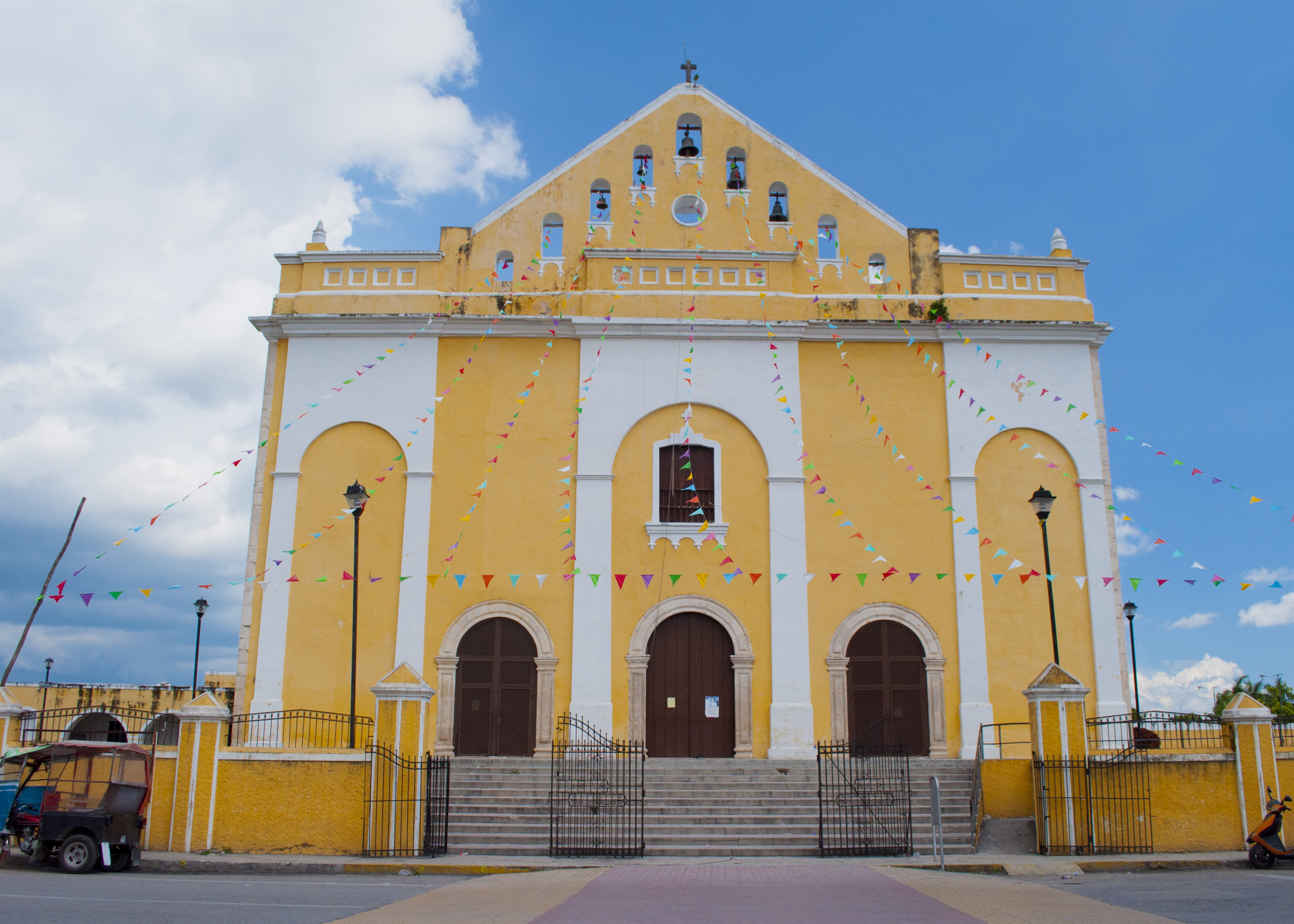
- Principal Church of Hunucmá

- Coat of arms

- Location within Yucatán (state)
- Coordinates: 21°00′55″N 89°52′28″W
- Country: Mexico
- State: Yucatán
- Municipality: Hunucmá
- Elevation: 6 m (20 ft)

Population (2020)
  - Total: 28,412
- Time zone: UTC-6 (Central Standard Time)
- Postal code: 97350
- Area code: 988

Hunucmá is a town and the municipal seat of the Hunucmá Municipality, Yucatán in Mexico. As of 2020, the town has a population of 28,412.

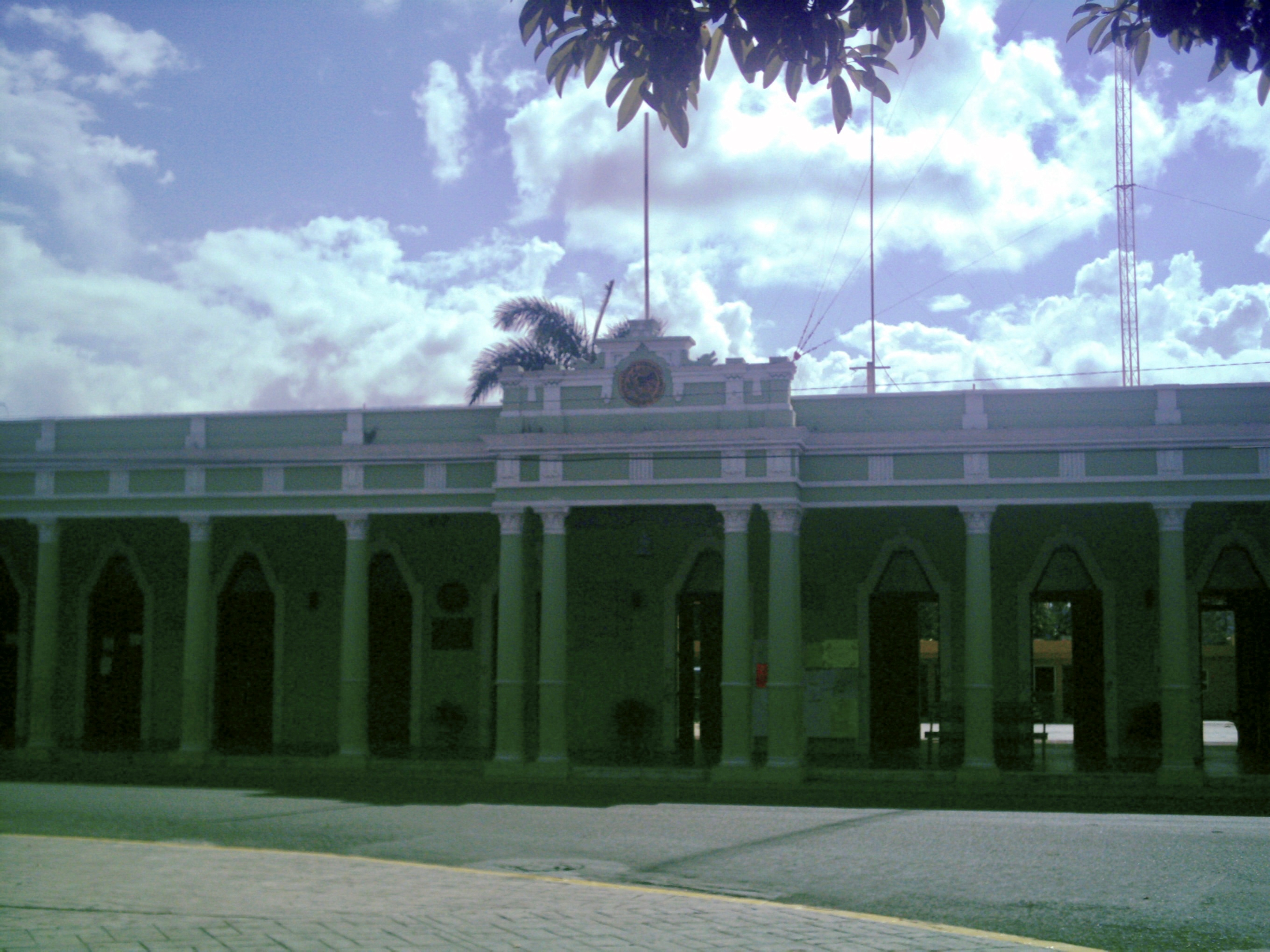
Municipal headquarters

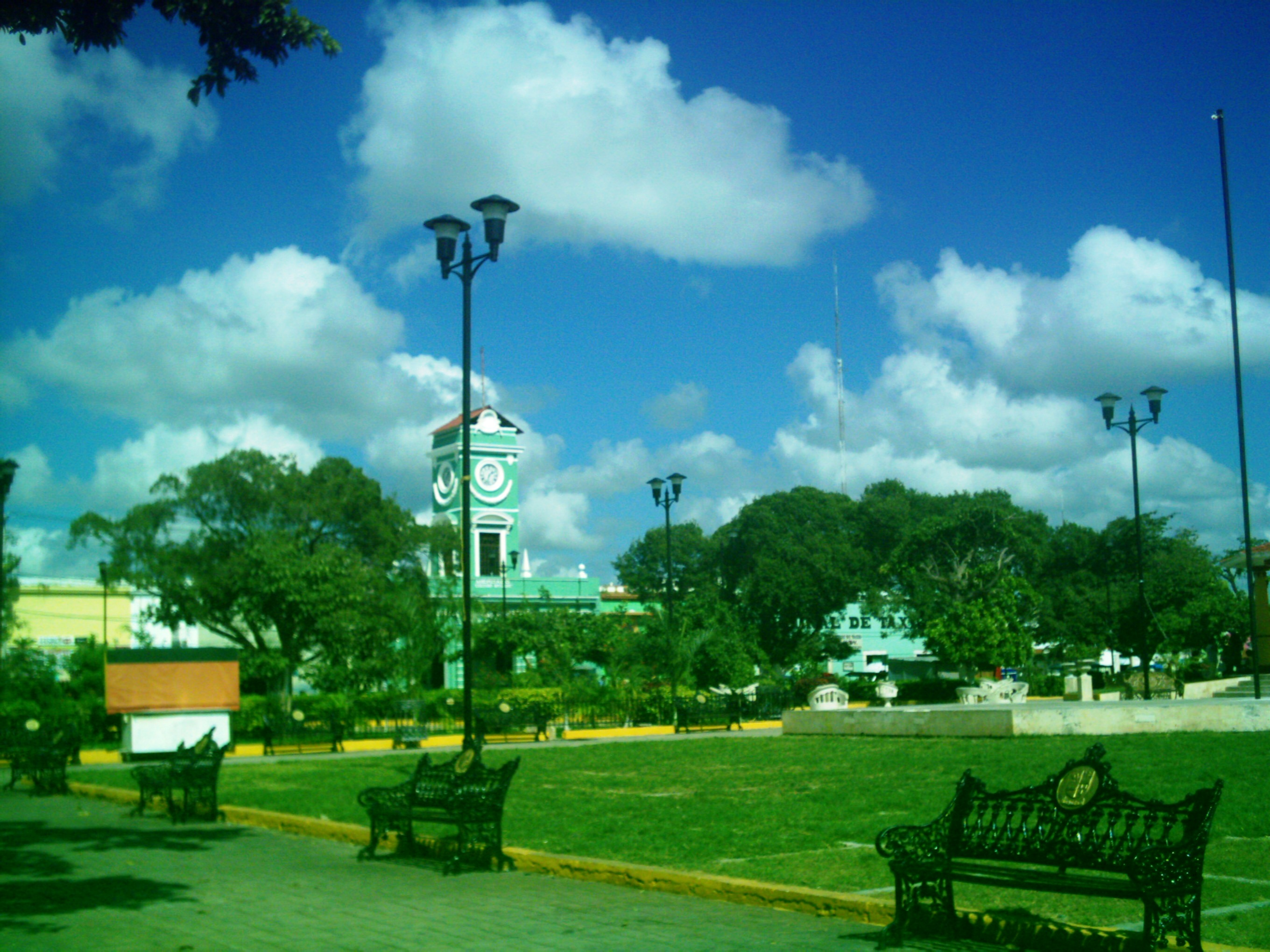
Park of Hunucmá

== Demographics ==
View chart definition.

== Climate ==
Hunucmá

Climate chart (precipitation, max. and min. temperature)
J	F	M	A	M	J	J	A	S	O	N	D
57 26 16	24 29 18	14 31 20	68 34 22	130 35 24	207 30 22	168 28 21	198 28 22	262 26 22	173 26 20	66 26 17	34 25 17
- █ Average max. and min. temperatures in °C
- █ Precipitation totals in mm
Imperial conversion
J	F	M	A	M	J	J	A	S	O	N	D
2.2 79 61	0.9 84 64	0.6 88 68	2.7 93 72	5.1 95 75	8.1 86 72	6.6 82 70	7.8 82 72	10 79 72	6.8 79 68	2.6 79 63	1.3 77 63
- █ Average max. and min. temperatures in °F
- █ Precipitation totals in inches
