= Édgar Sosa (boxer) =

Mexican boxer

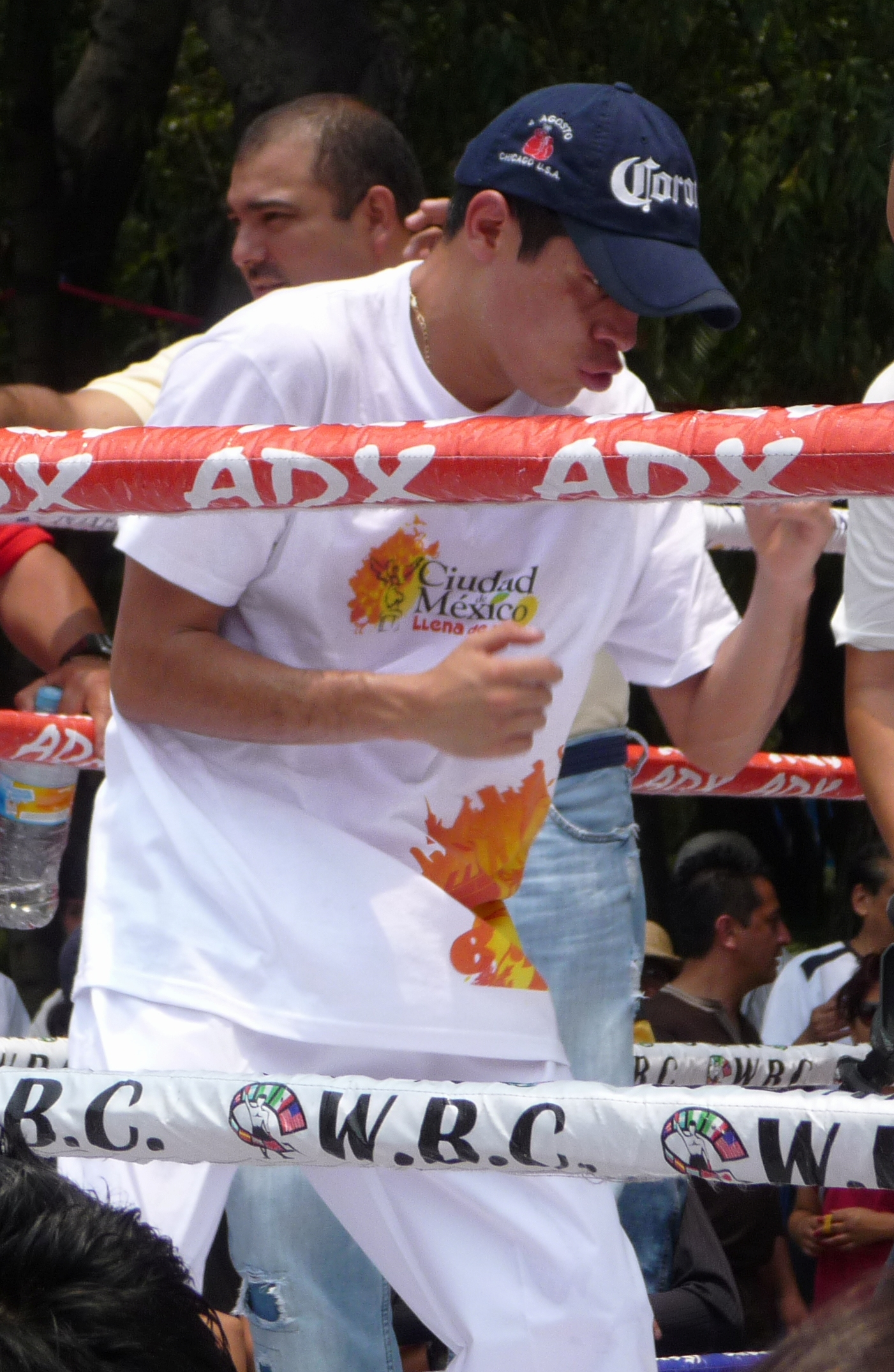

Personal information
- Born: Édgar Alejandro Sosa Medina; 23 August 1979 (age 46) Mexico City, Mexico
- Height: 1.61 m (5 ft 3 in)
- Weight: Light flyweight Flyweight; Super flyweight

Boxing career
- Reach: 170 cm (67 in)
- Stance: Orthodox

Boxing record
- Total fights: 64
- Wins: 53
- Win by KO: 31
- Losses: 11

Édgar Alejandro Sosa Medina (born 23 August 1979) is a Mexican professional boxer. He is the former WBC Light flyweight champion and went on to make ten title defenses.

== Professional career ==
Sosa suffered losses in the early part of his career, the first one came against another future Mexican light flyweight champion Ulises Solís. He faced off against Solis in a rematch in 2003 but lost once again. Sosa would then score fourteen straight victories including a win over future light flyweight champion Gilberto Keb Baas and former two time minimum weight champion Noel Arambulet.

=== WBC Light Flyweight Championship ===
On April 14, 2007, Sosa won the WBC Light Flyweight Championship by besting former champion Brian Viloria by unanimous decision. Sosa went on to successfully defend his title ten times.

In April 2009, he also got a 4th-round technical knockout victory over Porsawan Popramook.

==== Controversial title defense ====
On November 21, 2009, Sosa lost his title to Rodel Mayol. In the second round, Sosa was badly hurt by a headbutt from Mayol, sending Sosa to the canvas and causing him to sustain an injury which was later determined to be a triple-fracture. The referee ruled the headbutt as an unintentional foul and deducted a point from Mayol. After the ringside doctor inspected the wound, the referee allowed the fight to continue despite Sosa still being groggy from the injury. When the action resumed, Sosa was dropped and the referee waved it off moments later. Sosa, who required a metal plate to be implanted on his cheekbone due to multiple fractures, filed a protest with the WBC to have the decision changed to a "no contest".

Due to the controversial nature of his defeat the WBC have declared Sosa a "champion emeritus" and he is entitled to either a rematch with Mayol, or a fight with flyweight champion Pongsaklek Wonjongkam, once Sosa has recovered from his injuries. Sosa had discussed moving up in weight before his controversial loss.

== Professional boxing record ==
64 fights	53 wins	11 losses
By knockout	31	3
By decision	21	8
By disqualification	1	0

No.	Result	Record	Opponent	Type	Round, time	Date	Location	Notes
64	Win	53–11	Orlando Garcia Guerrero	KO	3 (6), 2:55	Nov 23, 2019	Teatro del Pueblo, Xmatkuil, Mexico	
63	Loss	52–11	Julio Cesar Martínez	UD	8	Jun 17, 2017	Explanada Delegacion Cuauhtemoc, Mexico City, Mexico	
62	Loss	52–10	Donnie Nietes	UD	12	Sep 24, 2016	StubHub Center, Carson, California, US	For vacant WBO Inter-Continental flyweight title
61	Win	52–9	Orlando Garcia Guerrero	UD	6	Feb 13, 2016	Deportivo Leandro Valle, Mexico City, Mexico	
60	Loss	51–9	Román González	TKO	2 (12), 2:37	May 16, 2015	Forum, Inglewood, California, US	For WBC and The Ring flyweight titles
59	Win	51–8	Carlos Melo	UD	10	Nov 8, 2014	Karibe Convention Center, Pétion-Ville, Haiti	
58	Win	50–8	Omar Salado	RTD	4 (8), 3:00	May 24, 2014	Auditorio Municipal, Tijuana, Mexico	
57	Loss	49–8	Akira Yaegashi	UD	12	Dec 6, 2013	Kokugikan, Japan	For WBC and The Ring flyweight titles
56	Win	49–7	Giovani Segura	UD	12	May 18, 2013	Plaza de Toros Eloy Cavazos, Zitacuaro, Mexico	Retained WBC Silver flyweight title
55	Win	48–7	Ulises Solís	KO	2 (12), 2:12	Mar 9, 2013	Gimnasio Usos Múltiples UdeG, Guadalajara, Mexico	Retained WBC Silver flyweight title
54	Win	47–7	Myung Ho Lee	MD	10	Oct 27, 2012	Arena Ciudad de Mexico, Mexico City, Mexico	
53	Win	46–7	Shigetaka Ikehara	RTD	8 (12), 3:00	Jul 28, 2012	Domo De La Feria, Leon, Mexico	Retained WBC Silver flyweight title
52	Win	45–7	Wilbert Uicab	UD	12	Apr 7, 2012	Oasis Hotel Complex, Cancun, Mexico	Retained WBC International flyweight title; Won WBC Silver flyweight title
51	Win	44–7	Roilo Golez	TKO	7 (12), 2:30	Jan 7, 2012	Foro Polanco, Polanco, Mexico	Retained WBC International flyweight title
50	Loss	43–7	Pongsaklek Wonjongkam	UD	12	Oct 21, 2011	11th Inf Reg, Bangkok, Thailand	For WBC and The Ring flyweight titles
49	Win	43–6	Julio Paz Hernández	KO	1 (12), 2:52	Jul 2, 2011	Plaza de Toros Fermin Rivera, San Luis Potosi, Mexico	Retained WBC International flyweight title
48	Win	42–6	Kenichi Horikawa	TKO	8 (12), 2:24	Apr 2, 2011	Arena Mexico, Mexico City, Mexico	Retained WBC International flyweight title
47	Win	41–6	Masafumi Okubo	UD	12	Nov 20, 2010	Arena Monterrey, Monterrey, Mexico	Retained WBC International flyweight title
46	Win	40–6	Ryan Bito	TKO	10 (12), 2:05	Sep 11, 2010	Monumental Plaza de Toros México, Mexico City, Mexico	Won WBC International flyweight title
45	Win	39–6	José Luis Varela	TKO	4 (10), 1:33	Aug 7, 2010	Arena Mexico, Mexico City, Mexico	
44	Win	38–6	Roberto Carlos Leyva	KO	2 (10), 1:12	Jun 5, 2010	Forum del Mundo Imperial, Acapulco, Mexico	
43	Loss	37–6	Rodel Mayol	TKO	2 (12), 1:52	Nov 21, 2009	Palenque de la Feria, Tuxtla Gutierrez, Mexico	Lost WBC light flyweight title
42	Win	37–5	Omar Soto	KO	6 (12), 2:30	Sep 15, 2009	Auditorio Siglo XXI, Puebla, Mexico	Retained WBC light flyweight title
41	Win	36–5	Carlos Melo	TKO	5 (12), 2:47	Jun 20, 2009	Arena Revolucion, Mexico City, Mexico	Retained WBC light flyweight title
40	Win	35–5	Somporn Seeta	TKO	4 (12), 2:32	Apr 4, 2009	Ciudad Victoria, Mexico	Retained WBC light flyweight title
39	Win	34–5	Juanito Rubillar	TKO	7 (12), 2:54	Nov 29, 2008	Arena Mexico, Mexico City, Mexico	Retained WBC light flyweight title
38	Win	33–5	Sonny Boy Jaro	UD	12	Sep 27, 2008	Arena Mexico, Mexico City, Mexico	Retained WBC light flyweight title
37	Win	32–5	Takashi Kunishige	TKO	8 (12), 1:39	Jun 14, 2008	Palacio de los Deportes, Mexico City, Mexico	Retained WBC light flyweight title
36	Win	31–5	Jesus Iribe	UD	12	Feb 9, 2008	Domo De La Feria, Leon, Mexico	Retained WBC light flyweight title
35	Win	30–5	Roberto Carlos Leyva	TKO	4 (12), 2:32	Nov 24, 2007	Estadio Beto Avila, Veracruz, Mexico	Retained WBC light flyweight title
34	Win	29–5	Lorenzo Trejo	TKO	9 (12), 2:02	Sep 16, 2007	Hard Rock Hotel and Casino, Las Vegas, Nevada, US	Retained WBC light flyweight title
33	Win	28–5	Luis Alberto Lazarte	DQ	10 (12), 2:46	Jul 28, 2007	Sindicato de Taxistas, Cancun, Mexico	Retained WBC light flyweight title
32	Win	27–5	Brian Viloria	MD	12	Apr 14, 2007	Alamodome, San Antonio, Texas, US	Won vacant WBC light flyweight title
31	Win	26–5	Noel Arambulet	TD	10 (10)	Sep 2, 2006	Karibe Convention Center, Pétion-Ville, Haiti	
30	Win	25–5	Regulo Gamez	KO	5 (12), 2:29	Jun 30, 2006	Casino del Lienzo Charro, San Juan de Aragon, Mexico	Retained WBC FECARBOX light flyweight title
29	Win	24–5	Jorge Romero	TKO	7 (10)	May 13, 2006	Gimnasio de la Nueva Atzacoalco, Mexico City, Mexico	
28	Win	23–5	Gilberto Keb Baas	UD	12	Mar 29, 2006	Sindicato de Trabajadores, Mexico City, Mexico	
27	Win	22–5	Job Solano	UD	12	Dec 21, 2005	Gimnasio de la Nueva Atzacoalco, Mexico City, Mexico	
26	Win	21–5	Martin Zepeda	TKO	2 (12)	Sep 22, 2005	Deportivo Morelos Pavon, Mexico City, Mexico	
25	Win	20–5	Jorge Romero	UD	10	Aug 26, 2005	Gimnasio de la Nueva Atzacoalco, Mexico City, Mexico	
24	Win	19–5	Oscar Martinez	KO	6 (12), 0:33	Jul 14, 2005	Salon 21, Mexico City, Mexico	Retained WBC FECARBOX light flyweight title
23	Win	18–5	Victor Hernandez	TKO	9 (10)	Apr 20, 2005	Salon Fascinacion, Mexico City, Mexico	
22	Win	17–5	Jorge Romero	UD	10	Oct 21, 2004	Salon Metropolis, Ciudad Nezahualcoyotl, Mexico	
21	Win	16–5	Francisco Rosas	UD	12	Jun 24, 2004	Salon 21, Mexico City, Mexico	Won WBC FECARBOX light flyweight title
20	Win	15–5	Branni Guerrero	TKO	5 (10)	Jun 11, 2004	Centro de Convenciones, Tlalnepantla, Mexico	
19	Win	14–5	Job Solano	UD	10	Apr 17, 2004	Sala de Armas, Mexico City, Mexico	
18	Win	13–5	Domingo Guillen	TKO	6 (12)	Dec 12, 2003	Karibe Convention Center, Pétion-Ville, Haiti	
17	Loss	12–5	Ulises Solís	MD	12	Sep 13, 2003	Casino Real, Mexico City, Mexico	For Mexico flyweight title
16	Loss	12–4	Isaac Bustos	MD	12	Jul 3, 2003	Centro de Espectaculos La Maraka, Mexico City, Mexico	For NABF minimumweight title
15	Win	12–3	Lauro Lopez	TKO	8 (10)	Mar 29, 2003	El Palenque de la Feria, Pachuca, Mexico	
14	Loss	11–3	Omar Niño Romero	UD	10	Oct 19, 2002	Arena Mexico, Mexico City, Mexico	
13	Win	11–2	Alberto Chuc Uicab	TKO	9 (10)	Sep 21, 2002	Arena, Mexico City, Mexico	
12	Win	10–2	Jose Manuel Perez	UD	10	Jul 20, 2002	Arena Mexico, Mexico City, Mexico	
11	Win	9–2	Victor Manuel Rojas	UD	8	Apr 6, 2002	Mexico City, Mexico	
10	Loss	8–2	Manuel Vargas	TKO	8 (8)	Nov 3, 2001	Arena Mexico, Mexico City, Mexico	
9	Win	8–1	Freddy Herrera	TKO	3 (8)	Sep 6, 2001	Mexico City, Mexico	
8	Win	7–1	Victor Manuel Rojas	TKO	3 (4)	Jun 30, 2001	Mexico City, Mexico	
7	Win	6–1	Ricardo Lavariega	TKO	2 (?)	Jun 9, 2001	Mexico City, Mexico	
6	Loss	5–1	Ulises Solís	SD	6	May 5, 2001	Arena Mexico, Mexico City, Mexico	
5	Win	5–0	Erik Ramirez	TKO	3 (4)	Jan 27, 2001	Arena Mexico, Mexico City, Mexico	
4	Win	4–0	Alejandro Contreras	PTS	4	Nov 4, 2000	Arena Mexico, Mexico City, Mexico	
3	Win	3–0	Moises Maldonado	TKO	2 (4)	Jul 8, 2000	Arena Mexico, Mexico City, Mexico	
2	Win	2–0	Cesar Gonzalez	PTS	4	May 27, 2000	Arena Mexico, Mexico City, Mexico	
1	Win	1–0	Cesar Gonzalez	PTS	4	Apr 1, 2000	Arena Mexico, Mexico City, Mexico	

== Titles in boxing ==
=== Major world titles ===
- WBC light flyweight champion (108 lbs)

=== Silver world titles (Note: In 2010, the WBC created the "Silver Championship", intended as a replacement for interim titles.) ===
- WBC Silver flyweight champion (112 lbs)

=== Regional/International titles ===
- WBC FECARBOX light flyweight champion (108 lbs)
- WBC International flyweight champion (112 lbs)

=== Honorary titles ===
- WBC Emeritus Champion

== See also ==
- List of WBC world champions
- List of Mexican boxing world champions

== Notes and references ==
=== References ===
Vacant Title last held by Omar Niño Romero	WBC Light Flyweight Champion; April 14, 2007 – November 21, 2009	Succeeded by Rodel Mayol
