= Juanito Rubillar =

Filipino boxer

Personal information
- Nationality: (Philippines) Filipino
- Born: Juanito Rubillar; February 22, 1977 (age 49) Barangay Central, Mati, Davao Oriental, Philippines
- Height: 5 ft 2 in (1.57 m)
- Weight: Light Flyweight

Boxing career
- Stance: Southpaw

Boxing record
- Total fights: 81
- Wins: 50
- Win by KO: 24
- Losses: 24
- Draws: 7

Juanito Rubillar (born February 22, 1977) is a Filipino former professional boxer and WBC Continental Americas light flyweight champions.

He is the younger brother of fellow boxer Ernesto Rubillar and older brother of Robert Rubillar.

Born in Davao Oriental, Rubillar lives in Parañaque, Metro Manila.

== Professional career ==
A veteran fighter, Rubillar made his professional debut on July 23, 1994, against fellow Filipino boxer Ramil Gevero. The fight ended with a draw, after 4 rounds.

Just like Bert Batawang, Rubillar suffered multiple losses and draws early in his career, but did not give up.

=== Recent fights ===
On February 27, 2010, Rubillar lost to South African boxer Hekkie Budler by a controversial Majority decision at the Emperors Casino in Kempton Park, Gauteng, South Africa. The bout was for the vacant International Boxing Organization light flyweight title.

The undefeated Budler started aggressively to take control of the early rounds, while Rubillar came back in the fourth and connected with a number of solid body shots as Budler took the defensive. Leading with his head as much as with his gloves which is Rubillar's style, the veteran Filipino staggered Budler on a number of occasions and while referee Pete Podgorski cautioned the Filipino a couple of times for using his head, he did not penalize Rubillar. The Filipino fighter took the pace in the seventh round and hammered Budler with solid hooks to the body and although Budler stayed on his feet he did not regain control of the fight although the official scorecards told a different story and gave Budler a win by Majority decision. Two out of three judges gave the fight 117-113 and 115-113 for Budler, while the third judge scored the bout even at 114-114. Rubillar's promoter and boxing manager Gabriel “Bebot” Elorde (son of the legendary Flash Elorde) sayd he will file a protest with the IBO over what was widely perceived to be a hometown decision in the IBF light flyweight title eliminator. He finally got a rematch, after Elorde's protest, which as in the previous bout, he also lost.

== Professional boxing record ==
81 fights	50 wins	24 losses
By knockout	24	7
By decision	26	17
Draws	7	

No.	Result	Record	Opponent	Type	Round, Time	Date	Location	Notes
81	Loss	50-24-7	(Ghana) Joseph Agbeko	TKO	4 (10) 1:31	30 May 2015	(United States) County Coliseum, El Paso	
80	Loss	50-23-7	(Mexico) Rey Vargas	KO	4 (8) 2:58	24 Aug 2013	(United States) StubHub Center, Carson	
79	Loss	50-22-7	(Russia) Khabir Suleymanov	UD	8	9 Aug 2013	(United States) Quiet Cannon, Montebello	
78	Loss	50-21-7	(Benin) Ghislain Vodounhessi	UD	6	21 Jun 2013	(United States) Four Points Sheraton Hotel, San Diego	
77	Win	50-20-7	(Dominican Republic) Basilio Nieves	TKO	5 (6) 1:00	21 Feb 2013	(United States) Four Points Sheraton Hotel, San Diego	Nieves claimed to have Hip Injury
76	Loss	49-20-7	(Puerto Rico) David Quijano	TD	10 (12) 2:30	15 Jun 2012	(United States) Civic Center, Kissimmee	For (vacant) WBO Latino Super Flyweight title
75	Loss	49-19-7	(Mexico) Edgar Jimenez	UD	10	24 Sep 11	(Mexico) Plaza de Toros, Juriquilla	
74	Loss	49-18-7	(Mexico) Oscar Ibarra	TKO	7 (12) 2:47	21 May 2011	(Mexico) San Martín Texmelucan de Labastida, Puebla	for WBC Silver Flyweight title
73	Loss	49-17-7	(Philippines) Nelson Llanos	UD	10	11 Dec 2010	(Philippines) Wawa Basketball Court, Barangay Sto. Nino, Paranaque City	
72	Loss	49-16-7	(South Africa) Hekkie Budler	SD	12	19 Jun 2010	(South Africa) Emperors Palace, Kempton Park	For IBO World Light Flyweight title
71	Loss	49-15-7	(South Africa) Hekkie Budler	MD	12	27 Feb 2010	(South Africa) Emperors Palace, Kempton Park	For (vacant) IBO World Light Flyweight title
70	Win	49-14-7	(Mexico) Jose Guadalupe Martinez	SD	10	21 Nov 2009	(Mexico) Palenque dela EXPOMEX, Nuevo Laredo	Won WBC Continental Americas Light Flyweight title
69	Win	48-14-7	(Philippines) Jason Geda	RTD	3 (8)	12 Sep 2009	(Philippines) San Andres Civic & Sports Center, District of Malate, Manila	
68	Loss	47-14-7	(Mexico) Giovani Segura	TKO	6 (12) 2:04	25 Jul 2009	(Mexico) Palenque del Recinto Ferial, Nuevo Vallarta	For WBA World Light Flyweight title
67	Loss	47-13-7	(Mexico) Omar Nino	TD	8 (12)	6 Jun 2009	(Mexico) Parque Xcaret, Cancun	WBC Light Flyweight Title Eliminator;Nino badly cut due to clash of heads
66	Loss	47-12-7	(Mexico) Edgar Sosa	TKO	7 (12) 2:54	29 Nov 2008	Arena Mexico, Mexico City	For WBC World Light Flyweight title
65	Win	47-11-7	(Mexico) Omar Nino	SD	12	14 Jun 2008	Palacio de los Deportes, Mexico City	WBC World Light Flyweight Title Eliminator
64	Win	46-11-7	(Thailand) Kriangrai Kaewnongsamet	TKO	2 (10) 1:36	3 May 2008	(Philippines) Mati Socio-Cultural Center, Mati City	
63	Win	45-11-7	(Korea) Byung Jong Lee	TKO	5 (12) 1:22	16 Nov 2007	(Philippines) San Andrez Civic & Sports Center, District of Malate, Manila	Defended OPBF Light Flyweight title
62	Win	44-11-7	(Philippines) Arnel Tadena	KO	2 (10) 2:55	15 Sep 2007	(Philippines) The Flash Grand Ballroom of Elorde Sports Complex, Paranaque City	
61	Win	43-11-7	(Japan) Ken Nakajima	KO	5 (12) 2:42	24 Jun 2007	(Japan) Nishinari Ward Gym, Osaka	Defended OPBF Light Flyweight title
60	Win	42-11-7	(Philippines) Larry Mede	TD	6 (10)	25 Feb 2007	(Philippines) Baguio City Convention Center, Baguio City	Rubillar suffers a two inch vertical cut above his left eyebrow from an accidental clash of heads to send the fight to the scorecards.
59	Win	41-11-7	(Indonesia) Irfan Ogah	TKO	7 (12) 1:08	13 Oct 2006	(Philippines) Trece Martires Gym, Trece Martires City	Won (vacant) OPBF Light Flyweight title
58	Loss	40-11-7	(Thailand) On Doowiset	UD	12	18 Jul 2006	(Thailand) The Mall Shopping Center, Bangkapi, Bangkok	For WBC Interim World Light Flyweight title
57	Win	40-10-7	(Philippines) Ronnie Canete	TD	5 (10) 1:33	6 May 2006	(Philippines) Santa Cruz Sports Center, Santa Cruz	Fight stopped due to a cut above Canete's left eye produced from an accidental head-butt in round 5.
56	Win	39-10-7	(Philippines) Ronnie Canete	UD	8	17 Mar 2006	(Philippines) Elorde Sports Center, Paranaque City	
55	Win	38-10-7	Acasio Simbajon	UD	10	18 Dec 2005	(Philippines) San Diosnisio Sports Center, Paranaque City	
54	Win	37-10-7	(Philippines) Edwin Ubatay	TKO	3 (10) 1:42	27 Aug 200&	(Philippines) Elorde Sports Center, Paranaque City	
53	Win	36-10-7	(Philippines) Acasio Simbajon	UD	10	29 Apr 2005	(Philippines) Tambo Seaside Square, Barangay Tambo, Paranaque City	
52	Win	35-10-7	(Philippines) Acasio Simbajon	TKO	8 0:56	8 Mar 2005	(Philippines) Mandaluyong Gym, Mandalyong Sports Center, Mandaluyong City	
51	Win	34-10-7	(Thailand) Ophat Niamprem	RTD	1 (10)	27 Nov 2004	(Philippines) PAGCOR Grand Theater, Airport Casino Filipino, Paranaque City	
50	Loss	33-10-7	(Mexico) Jorge Arce	UD	12	4 Sep 2004	(Mexico) Plaza de Toros, Tijuana	For WBC World Light Flyweight title
49	Draw	33-9-7	(Philippines) Acasio Simbajon	TD	3 (8)	21 Jul 2004	(Philippines) Grand Boulevard Hotel, Manila	Simbajon suffered a nasty cut just above his forehead from accidental head-butt at 36 seconds.
48	Win	33-9-6	(Philippines) Ricky Manatad	TKO	3 (10) 1:55	31 Mar 2004	(Philippines) Elorde Sports Center, Paranaque City	
47	Win	32-9-6	(Japan) Katsumi Makiyama	UD	8	29 Nov 2003	(Philippines) Olivarez College Sporte Center, Paranaque City	
46	Win	31-9-6	(Philippines) Roger Mananquil	TKO	4 (10) ?	2 Aug 2003	(Philippines) Olivarez College Sports Center, Paranaque City	
45	Win	30-9-6	(Philippines) Federico Catubay	TKO	5 (10) 2:59	24 May 2003	(Philippines) Ynares Sports Center, Antipolo	
44	Win	29-9-6	(Thailand) Khamhaeng Phanmee	TKO	7 (10) 2:09	15 Mar 2003	(Philippines) Luna Park Quirino Grandstand, Manila	
43	Win	28-9-6	(Philippines) Armando de la Cruz	UD	8	20 Nov 2002	(Philippines) PAGCOR Grand Theater, Airport Casino Filipino, Paranaque City	
42	Win	27-9-6	(Japan) Takayuki Korogi	KO	3 (10) 1:51	20 Aug 2002	(United States) Blaisdell Center Arena, Honolulu	
41	Draw	26-9-6	(Philippines) Joma Gamboa	TD	3 (12) 2:29	31 May 2002	(Philippines) Elorde Sports Center, Paranaque City	Defended WBC International Light Flyweight title;Technical draw due to cut suffered by Gamboa after accidental head clash.
40	Win	26-9-5	(Philippines) Rogelio Pineda	KO	4 (10) 1:59	22 Dec 2001	(Philippines) Bren Guiao Convention Center, San Fernando City	
39	Loss	25-9-5	(Mexico) Jorge Arce	UD	12	20 Oct 2001	(Mexico) Auditorio Municipal, Tijuana	For WBC Interim World Light Flyweight title
38	Win	25-8-5	(Japan) Takahiko Mizuno	KO	4 (12) 1:13	28 Jul 2001	(Philippines) PAGCOR Grand Theater, Airport Casino Filipino, Paranaque City	Defended WBC International Light Flyweight title
37	Win	24-8-5	(Thailand) Fahsang Pongsawang	TKO	6 (12) ?	28 Apr 2001	(Philippines) Kidapawan City, Cotabato del Norte	Defended WBC International Light Flyweight title
36	Win	23-8-5	(Philippines) Ray Ganton	UD	10	10 Feb 2001	(Philippines) Elorde Sports Center, Paranaque City	
35	Win	22-8-5	(Japan) Yuki Hashiguchi	UD	10	14 Nov 200	(United States) Dole Cannery Ballroom, Honolulu	
34	Win	21-8-5	(Philippines) Texas Gomez	TKO	3 (10) 2:29	6 Oct 2000	(Philippines) Elorde Sports Center, Paranaque City	
33	Win	20-8-5	(Philippines) Lolito Laroa	UD	10	26 Aug 2000	(Philippines) Elorde Sports Center, Paranaque City	
32	Win	19-8-5	(Korea) Jin Ho Kim	UD	12	27 May 2000	(Philippines) PAGCOR Grand Theater, Airport Casino Filipino, Paranaque City	Won WBC International Light Flyweight title
31	Win	18-8-5	(Philippines) Ronnie Canete	UD	10	25 Mar 2000	(Philippines) Paranaque City, Metro Manila	
30	Win	17-8-5	(Philippines) Roy Clave	KO	2 (10) 1:24	26 Feb 2000	(Philippines) Elorde Sports Center, Paranaque City	
29	Loss	16-8-5	(South Africa) Zolani Petelo	UD	12	3 Dec 1999	(United Kingdom) Bushfield Leisure Centre, Peterborough	For IBF World Minimumweight title
28	Win	16-7-5	(Indonesia) Nico Thomas	TKO	6 (12) ?	6 Nov 1999	Agana, Guam	Defended WBC International Minimunweight title
27	Win	15-7-5	(Philippines) Roy Clave	UD	10	18 Sep 1999	(Philippines) Barangay Sucat, Muntinlupa City	
26	Win	14-7-5	(South Africa) Ndoda Mayende	UD	10	26 Jun 1999	(Philippines) Elorde Sports Center, Paranaque City	
25	Win	13-7-5	(Philippines) Rocky Palma	RTD	3 (12)	10 Apr 1999	(Philippines) Paranaque City, Metro Manila	Won WBC International Minimunweight title
24	Win	12-7-5	(Philippines) Eugene Gonzales	UD	10	30 Dec 1998	(Philippines) Mandaluyong Gym, Mandaluyong Sports Center, Mandaluyong City	
23	Loss	11-7-5	(Thailand) Surachai Saengmorakot	UD	10	18 Nov 1998	(Thailand) Bangkok	
22	Loss	11-6-5	(Thailand) Fahsang Pongsawang	UD	10	23 Oct 1998	(Thailand) Sakon Nakhon	
21	Loss	11-5-5	(Thailand) Boonsai Sangsurat	KO	9 (10) ?	12 Aug 1998	(Thailand) Ratchadaphisek	
20	Win	11-4-5	(Philippines) Roger Mananquil	SD	10	18 Jul 1998	(Philippines) Mandaluyong Gym, Mandaluyong Sports Center, Mandaluyong City	
19	Los	10-4-5	(Thailand) Pongsaklek Wonjongkam	UD	10	5 Jun 1998	(Thailand) Bangkok	
18	Win	10-3-5	(Philippines) Roger de la Cruz	KO	8 (10) 0:48	2 May 1998	(Philippines) Elorde Sports Center, Paranaque City	
17	Loss	9-3-5	(Venezuela) Edgar Velasquez	UD	6	27 Nov 1996	(Japan) Korakuen Hall, Tokyo	
16	Loss	9-2-5	(Japan) Kusuo Eguchi	UD	10	15 Jul 1996	(Japan) Tokyo	
15	Loss	9-1-5	(Thailand) Pongsaklek Wonjongkam	KO	4 (6) ?	24 May 1996	(Thailand) Vichean Buri, Petchaboon	
14	Win	9-0-5	(Philippines) Rogelio Lapian	UD	10	23 Mar 1996	(Philippines) Almendras Gym, Davao City	
13	Draw	8-0-5	(Philippines) Rey Villamor	MD	10	2 Mar 1996	(Philippines) General Santos City, Cotabato del Sur	
12	Win	8-0-4	(Philippines) Sonny Boy Panding	TKO	3 (10) ?	27 Jan 1996	(Philippines) Sultan Kudarat	
11	Wi	7-0-4	(Philippines) Mike Luna	UD	10	29 Dec 1995	(Philippines) Carmen, Davao del Norte	
10	Draw	6-0-4	(Philippines) Randy Mangubat	MD	10	28 Oct 1995	(Philippines) Barangay Mount Diawata, Monkayo	
9	Win	6-0-3	(Philippines) Romeo Orlandez	MD	6	28 Sep 1995	(Philippines) Trento, Agusan del Norte	
8	Win	5-0-3	(Philippines) Rush Raymundo	UD	10	10 Sep 1995	(Philippines) Mati City, Davao Oriental	
7	Win	4-0-3	(Philippines) Sonny Boy Panding	UD	8	23 Apr 1995	(Philippines) District of Toril, Davao City	
6	Win	3-0-3	(Philippines) Rush Raymunda	UD	8	29 Jan 1995	(Philippines) District of Toril, Davao City	
5	Draw	2-0-3	(Philippines) Ricky Sales	MD	6	29 Dec 1994	(Philippines) Pantukan, Compostela Valley	
4	Win	2-0-2	(Philippines) Randy Mangubat	UD	6	17 Dec 1994	(Philippines) Tagum City, Davao del Norte	
3	Win	1-0-2	(Philippines) Kid Payes	MD	4	19 Nov 1994	(Philippines) Tagum City, Davao del Norte	
2	Draw	0-0-2	(Philippines) Ricky Sales	MD	4	1 Oct 1994	(Philippines) Tagum City, Davao del Norte	
1	Draw	0-0-1	(Philippines) Ramil Gevero	MD	4	23 Jul 1994	(Philippines) Kapalong, Davao del Norte	
