= Adrián Hernández (boxer) =

Mexican boxer (born 1986)

Personal information
- Nicknames: El Confesor; Big Bang
- Born: January 10, 1986 (age 40) Toluca, Mexico, Mexico
- Height: 5 ft 4 in (163 cm)
- Weight: Light flyweight; Flyweight

Boxing career
- Reach: 64 in (163 cm)
- Stance: Orthodox

Boxing record
- Total fights: 36
- Wins: 30
- Win by KO: 19
- Losses: 5
- Draws: 1

Adrián Hernández (born January 10, 1986) is a Mexican former professional boxer who competed from 2006 to 2015. He is a two-time world champion, having held the WBC light flyweight title twice between 2011 and 2014.

== Professional career ==
On February 9, 2008, Hernández knocked out Rodel Mayol. In March 2008, Hernández knocked out former WBC Light Flyweight Champion Gilberto Keb Baas. On May 8, 2010, Hernández beat the veteran Jose Guadalupe Martinez, to win NABF Light Flyweight Championship.

=== Winning the WBC Light Flyweight Championship ===
Hernández defeated the WBC Light Flyweight Champion Gilberto Keb Baas by doctor stoppage after the 10th of 12 rounds on April 30, 2011, to win the title. He then defeated Gideon Buthelezi by second-round knockout on September 24, 2011, to retain the title. The IBO Light Flyweight title was originally scheduled to be on the line, but Hernández did not win the title because he did not pay IBO sanctioning fees, so as a result of his win, the IBO title became vacant.

=== Losing and Regaining the WBC Light Flyweight Championship ===
Hernández would then lose the WBC Light Flyweight Championship to Kompayak Porpramook by 10th-round knockout on December 23, 2011, in Bangkok, Thailand.

He would rebound with wins over Oswaldo Fuentes and Ivan Diaz via first-round knockout on June 17, 2012, and unanimous decision on July 27, 2012, respectively. A rematch with Porpramook was then confirmed for October 6, 2012, where Hernández avenged his loss to Porpramook and regained the WBC Light Flyweight Championship via a sixth-round TKO in Toluca, Mexico.

Hernández would then successfully defend the title against Dirceu Cabarca on January 12, 2013, and against Yader Cardoza on May 11, 2013, both wins coming by unanimous decision.

His third and fourth successful defenses in his second reign as WBC Light Flyweight champion came against Atsushi Kakutani via fourth-round knockout on August 31, 2013, and Janiel Rivera via third-round technical knockout on February 8, 2014.

Hernández would lose the title to Naoya Inoue on April 6, 2014, via sixth-round technical knockout.

== Professional boxing record ==
36 fights	30 wins	5 losses
By knockout	19	4
By decision	11	1
Draws	1	

No.	Result	Record	Opponent	Type	Round, time	Date	Location	Notes
36	Loss	30–5–1	Saúl Juárez	SD	10	Aug 8, 2015	Arena Coliseo, Mexico City, Mexico	
35	Loss	30–4–1	Saúl Juárez	TKO	8 (8)	May 30, 2015	Arena Coliseo, Mexico City, Mexico	
34	Win	30–3–1	Armando Torres	TKO	2 (8), 2:27	Nov 22, 2014	Plaza de los Martíres, Toluca, Mexico	
33	Loss	29–3–1	Naoya Inoue	TKO	6 (12), 2:54	Apr 6, 2014	Ota City General Gymnasium, Tokyo, Japan	Lost WBC light flyweight title
32	Win	29–2–1	Janiel Rivera	TKO	3 (12), 1:34	Feb 8, 2014	Caballerizas, Huixquilucan, Mexico	Retained WBC light flyweight title
31	Win	28–2–1	Atsushi Kakutani	TKO	4 (12), 1:12	Aug 31, 2013	Gimnasio Olímpico, Mexico City, Mexico	Retained WBC light flyweight title
30	Win	27–2–1	Yader Cardoza	UD	12	May 11, 2013	Deportivo Agustín Ramos Millan, Toluca, Mexico	Retained WBC light flyweight title
29	Win	26–2–1	Dirceu Cabarca	UD	12	Jan 12, 2013	Deportivo Agustín Ramos Millan, Toluca, Mexico	Retained WBC light flyweight title
28	Win	25–2–1	Kompayak Porpramook	TKO	6 (12), 0:23	Oct 6, 2012	Centro de Convenciones, Toluca, Mexico	Won WBC light flyweight title
27	Win	24–2–1	Ivan Diaz	UD	10	Jul 27, 2012	Centro Libanes, Mexico City, Mexico	
26	Win	23–2–1	Oswaldo Fuentes	KO	1 (10), 2:51	Jun 17, 2012	Texcoco, Mexico	
25	Loss	22–2–1	Kompayak Porpramook	KO	10 (12), 2:31	Dec 23, 2011	11th Inf Reg, Bangkok, Thailand	Lost WBC light flyweight title
24	Win	22–1–1	Gideon Buthelezi	KO	2 (12), 2:20	Sep 24, 2011	Foro Scotiabank, Mexico City, Mexico	Retained WBC light flyweight title
23	Win	21–1–1	Gilberto Keb Baas	RTD	10 (12), 3:00	Apr 30, 2011	Coliseum Don King, Texcoco, Mexico	Won WBC light flyweight title
22	Win	20–1–1	Erik Ramirez	TKO	3 (10), 0:28	Nov 5, 2010	The Royal Hotel, Cancún, Mexico	
21	Win	19–1–1	Luis Cardenas	UD	6	Sep 11, 2010	Playboy Mansion, Beverly Hills, California, U.S.	
20	Win	18–1–1	Jose Martinez	UD	12	May 8, 2010	Hilton Hotel, Mexico City, Mexico	Retained NABF light-flyweight title
19	Win	17–1–1	Ganigan Lopez	SD	10	Feb 27, 2010	Coliseo Olimpico de la UG, Guadalajara, Mexico	
18	Win	16–1–1	Paulino Villalobos	UD	8	Oct 24, 2009	World Trade Center, Veracruz, Mexico	
17	Win	15–1–1	Abel Ochoa	PTS	6	May 16, 2009	Gran Teatro, Rome, Italy	
16	Win	14–1–1	Ivan Meneses	UD	10	Oct 24, 2008	PalaLido, Milan, Italy	
15	Loss	13–1–1	Oscar Ibarra	TKO	6 (12), 2:01	Jul 16, 2008	Foro Scotiabank, Mexico City, Mexico	For vacant NABF flyweight title
14	Draw	13–0–1	Eric Ortiz	TD	5 (12)	Jun 14, 2008	Palacio de los Deportes, Mexico City, Mexico	For vacant NABF flyweight title; TD after Ortiz cut from accidental head clash
13	Win	13–0	Gilberto Keb Baas	TKO	4 (12), 2:16	Mar 8, 2008	Plaza de Toros México, Cancún, Mexico	Retained WBC Continental Americas light flyweight title; Won vacant WBC International and NABF light flyweight titles
12	Win	12–0	Rodel Mayol	KO	4 (6)	Feb 9, 2008	Domo De La Feria, Leon, Mexico	
11	Win	11–0	Oscar Saturnino	TKO	6 (12)	Dec 15, 2007	Arena Naucalpan, Mexico City, Mexico	Won vacant WBC Continental Americas light flyweight title
10	Win	10–0	Antonio Garibay	KO	2	Oct 20, 2007	Palenque de la Expo, Ciudad Obregon, Mexico	
9	Win	9–0	Desperard Yasu	TKO	4 (6), 1:40	Jun 16, 2007	Korakuen Hall, Tokyo, Japan	
8	Win	8–0	Kyung-Jin Son	UD	6	May 3, 2007	Ariake Coliseum, Tokyo, Japan	
7	Win	7–0	Naciff Martinez	UD	6	Mar 31, 2007	Centro de Cancun, Cancún, Mexico	
6	Win	6–0	Oscar Herezo	TKO	1 (6), 2:50	Oct 7, 2006	Museo de Transporte, Xalapa, Mexico	
5	Win	5–0	Pascasio Zarate	TKO	4 (6)	Sep 2, 2006	Acapulco, Mexico	
4	Win	4–0	Emanuel Hernandez	KO	4 (6), 2:58	Jul 27, 2006	Palazzio Videmar, Mexico City, Mexico	
3	Win	3–0	Hector Hernandez	TKO	1 (4), 2:23	Jul 6, 2006	Salon 21, Mexico City, Mexico	
2	Win	2–0	Duan Gibran	TKO	1 (4), 2:39	Jun 1, 2006	Salon 21, Mexico City, Mexico	
1	Win	1–0	Benjamin Bouchan	TKO	1 (4), 0:31	Mar 9, 2006	Salon 21, Mexico City, Mexico	

== See also ==
- List of Mexican boxing world champions
- List of world light-flyweight boxing champions

Sporting positions
Regional boxing titles
Vacant Title last held by Francisco Soto	WBC Continental Americas light-flyweight Champion; December 15, 2007 – 2008; Vacated	Vacant Title next held by Jose Guadalupe Martinez
Vacant Title last held by Phumzile Matyhila	WBC International light-flyweight Champion; March 8, 2008 – 2009; Vacated	Vacant Title next held by Ramón García
Vacant Title last held by Giovani Segura	NABF light-flyweight champion March 8, 2008 – 2010; Vacated	Vacant Title next held by Pedro Guevara
World boxing titles
Preceded by Gilberto Keb Baas	WBC light-flyweight champion April 30, 2011 – December 23, 2011	Succeeded by Kompayak Porpramook
Preceded by Kompayak Porpramook	WBC light-flyweight champion October 6, 2012 – April 6, 2014	Succeeded by Naoya Inoue
