= Osvaldo Guerrero =

Mexican boxer

Personal information
- Nickname: Copala
- Born: Osvaldo Guerrero-Camargo; 20 January 1974 (age 52) Copala, Guerrero, Mexico
- Height: 160 cm (5 ft 3 in)
- Weight: Mini flyweight; Light flyweight; Flyweight; Bantamweight; Super bantamweight

Boxing career
- Reach: 163 cm (64 in)
- Stance: Orthodox

Boxing record
- Total fights: 50
- Wins: 27
- Win by KO: 24
- Losses: 23

Osvaldo Guerrero-Camargo (born 20 January 1974) is a Mexican former professional boxer who competed from 1991 to 2004, challenging for the IBF mini flyweight title in 1995.

== Pro career ==
Guerrero went pro in March 1991, he had fought a total of 21 times, only losing once to Rafael Orozco, a fellow-countryman by knockout in 1992. In 1995, he traveled to Thailand to challenge IBF Mini flyweight world title with Thai holder Ratanapol Sor Vorapin, Sor Vorapin's 12th title defense. Prior in 1994, he was WBC Strawweight international champion, by won with TKO Manny Melchor a former IBF Mini flyweight world champion from the Philippines, in the seventh round.

Long-haired Guerrero, who always nerves Sor Vorapin, gave an interview that he will defeat Sor Vorapin by knockout in the second round, and will take IBF title to unify with WBC same weight class of title holder Ricardo "El Finito" López, a fellow Mexican.

The event was held at a Chakkam Khanathon School in northern Thailand on December 30 of the same year. The bout turned out to be that he was the only receiving Sor Vorapin's punches, with only a few counterattacks especially in the fifth round. Finally, at the beginning of the sixth round, his mentor asked to surrender. After the fight, Sor Vorapin showed his sportsmanship by raising Guerrero's left hand around the ring to acknowledge his fighting spirit.

After that, he continued boxing and had four chances to challenge the regional and international titles, one of which was against former WBC Light flyweight world champion Melchor Cob Castro, but he lost all of them.

He lost 17 consecutive fights from 2000 until his retirement in 2004. Guerrero record for 50 fights is 27 wins (24 on knockouts), 23 losses (13 on knockouts); his overall knockout percentage was 48%.

== Professional boxing record ==
50 fights	27 wins	23 losses
By knockout	24	13
By decision	2	10
By disqualification	1	0

No.	Result	Record	Opponent	Type	Round, time	Date	Location	Notes
50	Loss	27–23	(Mexico) Oswaldo Juarez	PTS	6	30 May 2004	Mexico City, Mexico	
49	Loss	27–22	(Mexico) Fernando Beltrán Jr.	TKO	4 (10)	10 Dec 2003	Culiacán, Mexico	
48	Loss	27–21	(Spain) Sergio Palomo	PTS	6	28 Mar 2003	Raimundo Saporta Pavilion, Madrid, Spain	
47	Loss	27–20	(Spain) Miguel Mallon	UD	6	5 Feb 2003	Raimundo Saporta Pavilion, Madrid, Spain	
46	Loss	27–19	(Ghana) Ablorh Sowah	KO	1 (6), 1:24	18 Oct 2002	(United States) Hard Rock Live, Hollywood, Florida, U.S.	
45	Loss	27–18	(United States) Frankie Archuleta	TKO	3 (12), 2:31	21 Jun 2002	(United States) Sky City Casino, Acoma, New Mexico, U.S.	For vacant WBA–NABA super bantamweight title
44	Loss	27–17	(Japan) Akihiko Nago	TD	5 (6), 1:55	17 May 2002	(United States) Memorial Auditorium, Sacramento, California, U.S.	Fight stopped due to clash of heads
43	Loss	27–16	(Mexico) Carlos Madrigal	TKO	5 (12)	14 Mar 2002	(United States) Hilton Hotel, Burbank, California, U.S.	For vacant WBO Inter-Continental bantamweight title
42	Loss	27–15	(Mexico) Israel Vázquez	UD	10	22 Feb 2002	(United States) Quiet Cannon, Montebello, California, U.S.	
41	Loss	27–14	(United States) Salvador Garcia	UD	4	24 Jan 2002	(United States) Blanca's Fiesta Hall, Imperial Beach, California, U.S.	
40	Loss	27–13	(Armenia) Kahren Harutyunyan	UD	4	19 Dec 2001	(United States) Feather Falls Casino, Oroville, California, U.S.	
39	Loss	27–12	(Mexico) Carlos Madrigal	TKO	2 (10), 0:44	27 Sep 2001	(United States) Arrowhead Pond, Anaheim, California, U.S.	
38	Loss	27–11	(Mexico) Oscar Andrade	KO	6 (10), 1:47	21 Jul 2001	(United States) Feather Falls Casino, Oroville, California, U.S.	
37	Loss	27–10	(United States) Frankie Archuleta	UD	8	9 Jun 2001	(United States) Michael Marr Gymnasium, Las Vegas, Nevada, U.S.	
36	Loss	27–9	(Mexico) Juan Alfonso Keb Baas	TKO	12 (12)	1 Dec 2000	Mérida, Mexico	For vacant WBC FECARBOX light flyweight title
35	Loss	27–8	(Mexico) Fernando Montiel	KO	8	8 Sep 2000	Gimnasio Municipal, Ciudad Obregón, Mexico	
34	Loss	27–7	(Mexico) Alejandro Montiel	KO	9 (12)	10 Mar 2000	Estadio Emilio Ibarra Almada, Los Mochis, Mexico	For WBC Continental Americas flyweight title
33	Loss	27–6	(Mexico) Francisco Garcia	TKO	3 (12)	22 Jan 2000	Arena Coliseo, Mexico City, Mexico	For Mexican light flyweight title
32	Win	27–5	(Mexico) Felipe Lopez	TKO	2	20 Nov 1999	Arena Neza, Ciudad Nezahualcóyotl, Mexico	
31	Loss	26–5	(Mexico) Melchor Cob Castro	UD	12	17 Jul 1999	Arena Coliseo, Mexico City, Mexico	Lost WBC Continental Americas light flyweight title; For WBC–NABF light flyweight title
30	Win	26–4	(Mexico) Edgar Cárdenas	PTS	12	24 Apr 1999	Mexico City, Mexico	Won WBC Continental Americas light flyweight title
29	Loss	25–4	(Colombia) Jose Sanjuanelo	TKO	8 (12)	7 Nov 1998	Sabaneta, Colombia	For inaugural IBO light flyweight title
28	Win	25–3	(Colombia) Luis Escarpeta	KO	4	6 Jun 1998	Cartagena, Colombia	
27	Loss	24–3	(Colombia) Pedro Rodriguez	PTS	8	28 Feb 1998	Barranquilla, Colombia	
26	Win	24–2	(Colombia) Luis Escarpeta	TKO	4	12 Dec 1997	Coliseo Bernardo Caraballo, Cartagena, Colombia	
25	Win	23–2	(Colombia) Joel Garcia	TKO	2	31 Oct 1997	Barranquilla, Colombia	
24	Win	22–2	(Colombia) Edgar Echeverria	KO	2	19 Sep 1997	Cartagena, Colombia	
23	Win	21–2	(Colombia) Benjamin Rivas	KO	2 (8)	8 Aug 1997	Cartagena, Colombia	
22	Win	20–2	(Colombia) Giovanni Munoz	KO	3	16 May 1997	Barranquilla, Colombia	
21	Win	19–2	(Venezuela) Rafael Castro	TKO	2	2 May 1997	Colombia	
20	Win	18–2	(Colombia) Dunoy Pena	KO	8	14 Mar 1997	Colombia	
19	Loss	17–2	(Thailand) Ratanapol Sor Vorapin	TKO	6 (12), 1:26	30 Dec 1995	Chakkam Khanathon School, Lamphun, Thailand	For IBF mini flyweight title
18	Win	17–1	(Colombia) Ilson Diaz	TKO	2	23 Aug 1995	Colombia	
17	Win	16–1	(Colombia) Henry Rodriguez	KO	2	4 Aug 1995	Barranquilla, Colombia	
16	Win	15–1	(Philippines) Manny Melchor	TKO	7 (12)	12 Aug 1994	Mexico City, Mexico	Won vacant WBC International mini flyweight title
15	Win	14–1	(Mexico) Jose Luis Velarde	TKO	5	28 May 1994	Mexico City, Mexico	
14	Win	13–1	(Mexico) Jose Luis Velarde	TKO	8	29 Jan 1994	Mexico City, Mexico	
13	Win	12–1	(Mexico) Jaime Rojas	TKO	5	1 Oct 1993	Mexico	
12	Win	11–1	(Mexico) Jesus Jimenez Ruiz	TKO	2	7 Aug 1993	Mexico	
11	Win	10–1	(Mexico) Víctor Burgos	TKO	1 (4)	8 Jul 1993	Plaza de Toros, Tijuana, Mexico	
10	Win	9–1	(Mexico) Manuel Leal	TKO	2	22 May 1993	Mexico	
9	Win	8–1	(Mexico) Ricardo Marquez	DQ	6	22 Mar 1993	Tijuana, Mexico	
8	Loss	7–1	(Mexico) Rafael Orozco	TKO	3 (10)	10 Oct 1992	Mexico City, Mexico	
7	Win	7–0	(Mexico) Martin Cadena	TKO	4	15 Jul 1992	Mexico	
6	Win	6–0	(Mexico) Rafael Granillo	TKO	3 (6)	29 May 1992	Plaza de Toros Calafia, Mexicali, Mexico	
5	Win	5–0	(Mexico) Valerio Sanchez	PTS	6	18 Jan 1992	Mexico City, Mexico	
4	Win	4–0	(Mexico) Esteban Manriquez	TKO	5	22 Nov 1991	Arena Naucalpan, Naucalpan de Juárez, Mexico	
3	Win	3–0	(Mexico) Agustin Luna	TKO	2 (6)	9 Nov 1991	Mexico City, Mexico	
2	Win	2–0	(Mexico) Edgar Cárdenas	TKO	3	5 Oct 1991	Arena Coliseo, Mexico City, Mexico	
1	Win	1–0	(Mexico) Martin Najera	KO	2	15 Mar 1991	Mexico	
