= Alejandro Montiel =

Mexican boxer (born 1971)

Personal information
- Nickname: Rude Boy
- Born: Alejandro Félix Montiel; 24 April 1971 (age 55) Los Mochis, Sinaloa, Mexico
- Height: 1.71 m (5 ft 7 in)
- Weight: Super bantamweight

Boxing career
- Reach: 178 cm (70 in)
- Stance: Orthodox

Boxing record
- Total fights: 60
- Wins: 51
- Win by KO: 30
- Losses: 8
- Draws: 0
- No contests: 1

Alejandro Félix Montiel (born 24 April 1971) is a Mexican professional boxer and a former IBA flyweight champion. He is a cousin of former world champion Fernando Montiel.

== Professional career ==
In May 2001, Montiel beat the WBO flyweight champion Ruben Sánchez León, to win the IBA flyweight title.

== Professional boxing record ==
60 fights	51 wins	8 losses
By knockout	30	5
By decision	20	3
By disqualification	1	0
No contests	1	

No.	Result	Record	Opponent	Type	Round, time	Date	Location	Notes
60	Loss	51–8 (1)	Jonathan Oquendo	TKO	1 (10), 1:50	16 Dec 2006	Coliseo Antonio R. Barceló, Toa Baja, Puerto Rico	
59	Loss	51–7 (1)	Michael Domingo	TKO	7 (10), 1:04	2 Jul 2006	Araneta Coliseum, Quezon City, Philippines	
58	Win	51–6 (1)	Agapito Ontiveros	TKO	5 (8), 1:44	12 May 2006	Auditorio Benito Juárez, Los Mochis, Mexico	
57	Win	50–6 (1)	Aarón Sepúlveda	TKO	3 (10), 1:48	16 Jul 2004	Sindicato, Sinaloa de Leyva, Mexico	
56	Loss	49–6 (1)	Jhonny González	TKO	6 (12), 0:21	13 May 2004	Sports Arena, San Diego, California, U.S.	For vacant WBO–NABO bantamweight title
55	Win	49–5 (1)	Francisco García	SD	10	7 Nov 2003	Parque Revolución, Culiacán, Mexico	
54	Loss	48–5 (1)	Vic Darchinyan	UD	10	8 Aug 2003	Panthers World of Entertainment, Penrith, Australia	
53	Loss	48–4 (1)	Irene Pacheco	UD	12	29 Nov 2002	El Paso Convention Center, El Paso, Texas, U.S.	For IBF flyweight title
52	NC	48–3 (1)	Tomás Rojas	NC	2 (12)	17 May 2002	Auditorio Benito Juárez, Los Mochis, Mexico	Retained IBA flyweight title; Montiel suffered a broken right ankle
51	Win	48–3	Óscar Andrade	UD	12	1 Sep 2001	Auditorio Benito Juárez, Los Mochis, Mexico	Retained IBA flyweight title
50	Win	47–3	Rubén Sánchez León	UD	12	11 May 2001	Convention Center, Tulsa, Oklahoma, U.S.	Won vacant IBA flyweight title
49	Win	46–3	José Laureano	UD	12	9 Dec 2000	PAL Gymnasium, Homestead, Florida, U.S.	Retained WBC Continental Americas flyweight title
48	Win	45–3	Javier Ángeles	TKO	4 (10)	14 Jul 2000	Auditorio Benito Juárez, Los Mochis, Mexico	
47	Win	44–3	Osvaldo Guerrero	KO	9 (12)	10 Mar 2000	Estadio Emilio Ibarra Almada, Los Mochis, Mexico	Retained WBC Continental Americas flyweight title
46	Win	43–3	Alfredo Virgen	TKO	5 (12)	11 Feb 2000	Auditorio Benito Juárez, Culiacán, Mexico	Retained WBC Continental Americas flyweight title
45	Win	42–3	Miguel Martínez	TKO	2 (10)	14 Jan 2000	Civic Center, Maywood, California, U.S.	
44	Win	41–3	Edgar Cárdenas	TKO	10 (12)	7 Aug 1999	Miccosukee Indian Resort & Gaming, Miami, Florida, U.S.	Retained WBC Continental Americas flyweight title
43	Win	40–3	José Vargas	KO	3 (12), 1:34	28 May 1999	Parque Revolución, Culiacán, Mexico	Retained WBC Continental Americas flyweight title
42	Win	39–3	Manuel Jesús Herrera	UD	12	19 Dec 1998	Spotlight 29 Casino, Coachella, California, U.S.	Retained WBC Continental Americas flyweight title
41	Win	38–3	Julio Coronel	UD	12	18 Jul 1998	Arizona Charlie's, Las Vegas, Nevada, U.S.	Retained WBC Continental Americas flyweight title
40	Win	37–3	Leonardo Gutiérrez	UD	12	15 Mar 1998	Auditorio Benito Juárez, Los Mochis, Mexico	Retained WBC Continental Americas flyweight title
39	Win	36–3	Ysaias Zamudio	UD	12	14 Mar 1998	Arizona Charlie's, Las Vegas, Nevada, U.S.	Retained WBC Continental Americas flyweight title
38	Win	35–3	Eduardo García	SD	12	21 Oct 1997	Discoteca La Boom, Lomas de Sotelo, Mexico	Won vacant WBC Continental Americas flyweight title
37	Win	34–3	Miguel Ángel Granados	UD	10	7 Apr 1997	Arrowhead Pond, Anaheim, California, U.S.	
36	Loss	33–3	Mark Johnson	UD	12	10 Feb 1997	Great Western Forum, Inglewood, California, U.S.	For IBF flyweight title
35	Win	33–2	Esteban Ayala	KO	4	14 Sep 1996	Great Western Forum, Inglewood, California, U.S.	
34	Win	32–2	Edison Torres	KO	9 (10)	30 Mar 1996	Huntington Park Casino, Huntington Park, California, U.S.	
33	Win	31–2	José Quirino	UD	10	9 Oct 1995	Auditorio Municipal, Tijuana, Mexico	
32	Win	30–2	Raúl Ríos	KO	9 (12)	11 Aug 1995	Parque Revolución, Culiacán, Mexico	Retained WBC Continental Americas flyweight title
31	Win	29–2	Óscar Calzada	KO	2 (12)	24 Mar 1995	Auditorio Benito Juárez, Los Mochis, Mexico	Retained WBC Continental Americas flyweight title
30	Win	28–2	Ladislao Vázquez	SD	12	16 Dec 1994	Reynosa, Tamaulipas, Mexico	Retained WBC Continental Americas flyweight title
29	Win	27–2	Marcos Pacheco	KO	10 (12)	18 Aug 1994	Los Mochis, Sinaloa, Mexico	Retained WBC Continental Americas flyweight title
28	Win	26–2	Hugo Torres	KO	3 (10)	26 Mar 1994	Mexico City, Distrito Federal, Mexico	Retained WBC Continental Americas flyweight title
27	Loss	25–2	Miguel Espinoza	TKO	9 (12)	18 Nov 1993	Culiacán, Sinaloa, Mexico	
26	Win	25–1	José Quirino	TKO	7 (12)	16 Jul 1993	Culiacán, Sinaloa, Mexico	
25	Win	24–1	Eduardo Ramírez	TD	10 (12)	30 Apr 1993	Estadio Emilio Ibarra Almada, Los Mochis, Mexico	
24	Loss	23–1	Raúl Ríos	TKO	10 (12)	18 Dec 1992	Culiacán, Sinaloa, Mexico	Lost Mexican light-flyweight title
23	Win	23–0	Ismael Rodríguez	DQ	10 (12)	16 Oct 1992	Culiacán, Sinaloa, Mexico	Retained Mexican light-flyweight title
22	Win	22–0	Gerardo García	SD	12	17 Jul 1992	Culiacán, Sinaloa, Mexico	Retained Mexican light-flyweight title
21	Win	21–0	Alfredo Xeque	PTS	12	30 Apr 1992	Culiacán, Sinaloa, Mexico	Retained Mexican light-flyweight title
20	Win	20–0	Carlos Alberto Rodríguez	PTS	12	28 Feb 1992	Culiacán, Sinaloa, Mexico	Won vacant WBC Continental Americas flyweight title
19	Win	19–0	Antonio Pérez	KO	7 (12)	18 Oct 1991	Poza Rica, Veracruz, Mexico	Won Mexican light-flyweight title
18	Win	18–0	Julio César Cardona	KO	2	16 Aug 1991	Culiacán, Sinaloa, Mexico	
17	Win	17–0	Rey Hernández	KO	5	5 Jul 1991	Culiacán, Sinaloa, Mexico	
16	Win	16–0	Javier Varguez	UD	10	16 May 1991	Culiacán, Sinaloa, Mexico	
15	Win	15–0	Raúl Ríos	UD	10	28 Feb 1991	Culiacán, Sinaloa, Mexico	
14	Win	14–0	Germán Torres	KO	10 (10)	14 Dec 1990	Los Mochis, Sinaloa, Mexico	
13	Win	13–0	Víctor Hernández	KO	2	5 Oct 1990	Los Mochis, Sinaloa, Mexico	
12	Win	12–0	José Luis Velarde	KO	6	14 Sep 1990	Plaza de Toros la Sinaloense, Culiacán, Mexico	
11	Win	11–0	Juan García	KO	4	29 Jun 1990	Los Mochis, Sinaloa, Mexico	
10	Win	10–0	Jorge Torres	KO	5	4 May 1990	Los Mochis, Sinaloa, Mexico	
9	Win	9–0	Antonio Torres	KO	4	23 Mar 1990	Los Mochis, Sinaloa, Mexico	
8	Win	8–0	Martín Urías	KO	4	5 Dec 1989	Los Mochis, Sinaloa, Mexico	
7	Win	7–0	Jorge Torres	PTS	8	17 Nov 1989	Los Mochis, Sinaloa, Mexico	
6	Win	6–0	Fernie Islas	KO	3	7 Oct 1989	Los Mochis, Sinaloa, Mexico	
5	Win	5–0	Rodolfo González	KO	1	9 Sep 1989	Los Mochis, Sinaloa, Mexico	
4	Win	4–0	Pablo Tiznado	PTS	6	8 Aug 1989	La Paz, Baja California Sur, Mexico	
3	Win	3–0	Martín Cardeña	KO	6	2 Jun 1989	Los Mochis, Sinaloa, Mexico	
2	Win	2–0	Martín Cardeña	KO	6	14 Apr 1989	Los Mochis, Sinaloa, Mexico	
1	Win	1–0	Humberto Corrales	KO	1, 2:03	3 Mar 1989	Lienzo Charro, Los Mochis, Mexico	

== See also ==
- Notable boxing families
