= Miguel Barrera =

Colombian boxer (born 1978)

Personal information
- Nickname: El Huracán (The Hurricane)
- Nationality: Colombian
- Born: Miguel Angel Barrera Estrada; 15 November 1978 (age 47) Canalete, Córdoba, Colombia
- Weight: Minimumweight

Boxing career
- Stance: Orthodox

Boxing record
- Total fights: 26
- Wins: 23
- Win by KO: 13
- Losses: 1
- Draws: 2

Miguel Angel Barrera Estrada (born 15 November 1978 in San Jose de Canalete) is a former Colombian strawweight boxer, who once held the International Boxing Federation version of the Minimumweight world title.

== Pro career ==
Known as "El Huracan", Barrera made his debut as a professional boxer in 1998 and was undefeated in his first 23 bouts as a pro before capturing the IBF minimumweight title by defeating Roberto Carlos Leyva by decision in 2002. The following year he knocked out Leyva in a rematch. In his next defense later in 2003, he lost via TKO to Edgar Cardenas. After being dropped by Cardenas, the champion tried to rise but collapsed back to the canvas. Following the loss, Barrera had surgery the following day to remove a cerebral blood cut suffered from the knockout at the Hospital Del Prado of Tijuana. Barrera retired after the loss.

Barrera's career record was 23 wins (13 by KO), 1 losses, 2 draws.

Preceded by Roberto Carlos Leyva	IBF Minimumweight Champion; 9 August 2002 – 31 May 2003	Succeeded by Edgar Cardenas

== Professional boxing record ==
26 fights	23 wins	1 loss
By knockout	13	1
By decision	10	0
Draws	2	

No.	Result	Record	Opponent	Type	Round, time	Date	Location	Notes
26	Loss	23–1–2	(Mexico) Edgar Cárdenas	KO	10 (12), 1:46	31 May 2003	Auditorio Municipal, Tijuana, Mexico	Lost IBF mini flyweight title
25	Win	23–0–2	(Mexico) Roberto Carlos Leyva	KO	3 (12), 1:23	22 Mar 2003	(United States) Mandalay Bay Events Center, Paradise, Nevada, U.S.	Retained IBF mini flyweight title
24	Win	22–0–2	(Mexico) Roberto Carlos Leyva	UD	12	9 Aug 2002	(United States) The Orleans, Paradise, Nevada, U.S.	Won IBF mini flyweight title
23	Win	21–0–2	(Colombia) Pedro Rodriguez	TKO	4 (?)	19 Jan 2002	Cartagena, Colombia	
22	Draw	20–0–2	(Mexico) Roberto Carlos Leyva	TD	3 (12)	28 Sep 2001	Gimnasio Oscar 'Tigre' García, Ensenada, Mexico	For IBF mini flyweight title
21	Win	20–0–1	(Colombia) Farid Cassiani	PTS	8	27 Jul 2001	Cartagena, Colombia	
20	Win	19–0–1	(Colombia) Carlos Guerrero	KO	2 (?)	29 Jun 2001	Barranquilla, Colombia	
19	Win	18–0–1	(Colombia) Pedro Rodriguez	TKO	2 (8)	27 Apr 2001	Polideportivo San Felipe, Barranquilla, Colombia	
18	Win	17–0–1	(Colombia) Felipe Almanza	TKO	6 (8)	11 Feb 2001	Barranquilla, Colombia	
17	Win	16–0–1	(Colombia) Jhon Alberto Molina	PTS	10	23 Dec 2000	Barranquilla, Colombia	
16	Win	15–0–1	(Colombia) Sofanor Recuero	TKO	3 (?)	1 Dec 2000	Barranquilla, Colombia	
15	Win	14–0–1	(Colombia) Farid Cassiani	KO	4 (?)	3 Nov 2000	Barranquilla, Colombia	
14	Win	13–0–1	(Colombia) Ilson Diaz	KO	2 (?)	6 Oct 2000	Barranquilla, Colombia	
13	Win	12–0–1	(Colombia) Edwin Barrios	KO	1 (6)	23 Sep 2000	Cartagena, Colombia	
12	Win	11–0–1	(Colombia) Alfredo Toro	PTS	6	26 Aug 2000	Galapa, Colombia	
11	Win	10–0–1	(Colombia) Jose Humberto Caraballo	PTS	6	29 Jul 2000	Barranquilla, Colombia	
10	Win	9–0–1	(Venezuela) Juan Jose Landaeta	PTS	6	1 Jul 2000	Maicao, Colombia	
9	Win	8–0–1	(Colombia) Luis Blanco	PTS	6	31 Mar 2000	Barranquilla, Colombia	
8	Win	7–0–1	(Colombia) Alejandro Martinez	TKO	4 (4)	17 Mar 2000	Cartagena, Colombia	
7	Win	6–0–1	(Colombia) Felix Fontalvo	PTS	6	19 Dec 1999	Barranquilla, Colombia	
6	Win	5–0–1	(Colombia) Roberto Herrera	PTS	6	16 Oct 1999	Salon Jumbo del Country Club, Barranquilla, Colombia	
5	Win	4–0–1	(Colombia) Francisco Bolanos	TKO	2 (?)	14 Aug 1999	Barranquilla, Colombia	
4	Draw	3–0–1	(Colombia) Ricardo Orozco	PTS	4	11 Jul 1999	Cartagena, Colombia	
3	Win	3–0	(Colombia) Lorenzo Barrios	PTS	4	13 May 1999	San Jose de Canalete, Colombia	
2	Win	2–0	(Colombia) Never Altahona	KO	3 (?)	22 Dec 1998	Canalete, Colombia	
1	Win	1–0	(Colombia) Jose Vasquez	KO	3 (?)	15 Nov 1998	Canalete, Colombia	

Achievements
Vacant Title last held by Roberto Carlos Leyva	IBF minimumweight champion August 9, 2022 – May 31, 2003	Succeeded by Edgar Cárdenas
