= Xeque =

Xeque is a surname. Notable people with the surname include:

- Alfredo Xeque (born 1969), Mexican boxer
- Muley Xeque (1566–1621), Moroccan prince
