= Wirot Nutaphand =

Wirot Nutaphand (Note: Also spelled Nootpand, Nutphand, and Nutphund.) (November 5, 1932 – June 5, 2005 in Bangkok) was a Thai zoologist, herpetologist, naturalist, scientific illustrator, and zoo director. He is regarded as a pioneer in the field of herpetology in Thailand.

== Life and career ==
He was born in Bang Khun Phrom, Phra Nakhon province (now Phra Nakhon district, Bangkok), in the house of his grandfather, a nobleman with the rank of Phraya. It was his grandfather who nurtured in him a deep love for nature.

Nutaphand began his education at Chakkam Khanathon School in Lamphun, then attended Bangkok Christian College and Yothinburana School. He later earned a bachelor's degree in painting, sculpture, and printmaking from Silpakorn University. He also served in the Royal Thai Air Force, attaining the rank of Senior Group Captain (Sr Gp Capt). He later studied medical media and audio visual arts at the Faculty of Medicine Siriraj Hospital, Mahidol University, and pursued postgraduate studies in anatomy and histology at the same university.

Driven by a passion for wildlife, he conducted extensive fieldwork and sought out knowledge from various experts. At the time, there was no formal study of reptiles and amphibians in Thailand, so he took it upon himself to specialize in this field. He studied foreign scientific literature and kept over 300 terrariums of amphibians and snakes at home for close observation.

In 1979, he became the first Thai to successfully keep a Fly River turtle (Carettochelys insculpta), a rare and expensive species. At the time, it was said that only five people in the world had one, all from different countries.

In 1983, he co-founded the Pata Zoo, located on the sixth and seventh floors of the Pata Pinklao Department Store in Bangkok. The zoo marked a turning point in Thai zoological practice, being the first in the world to breed the albino Burmese python (Python bivittatus), among other rare animals. His office was located on the sixth floor, where the nocturnal and herpetological exhibits were housed.

Nutaphand was also an educator and public speaker, helping to promote accurate knowledge about reptiles and amphibians, and served as a fellow of the Royal Institute of Thailand in the field of zoology.

In taxonomy, he described many new species of reptiles and amphibians. However, his work is now viewed as scientifically limited due to the lack of reference to up-to-date research and neglect of formal nomenclature codes. As a result, many of the scientific names he proposed are now outdated or considered synonyms of previously described species.

== Taxon described by him ==
- Boiga saengsomi Nutaphand, 1985
- Boiga siamensis Nootpand, 1971
- Chitra chitra Nutphand, 1986
- Kaloula aureata Nutphand, 1989
- Varanus salvator komaini Nutphand, 1987

== Eponymous species ==
- Craspedocephalus wiroti (Trutnau, 1981)
- Gekko nutaphandi Bauer, Sumontha & Pauwels, 2008
- Testudo nutapundi Reimann, 1979

== Publications ==
Books

- Wirot Nutaphand. (1979). The Turtles of Thailand. Siam Farm Zoological Garden, Bangkok, 222 pages.
- Wirot Nutaphand. (2001). Patterns of the Snakes of Thailand. Amarin Printing and Publishing, Bangkok, 319 pages.
- Wirot Nutaphand. (2001). Amphibians of Thailand. Amarin Printing and Publishing, Bangkok, 192 pages.

Scholarly articles

- Wirot Nutaphand, Merel J. Cox, Ludwig Trutnau, Hobart Muir Smith. (1991). The status of the Thai palm viper, Trimeresurus wiroti. In: Bulletin of the Maryland Herpetological Society. Vol. 27, Issue 3, pp. 146–156.
- Wirot Nutaphand, Merel J. Cox, Hobart Muir Smith, David Chiszar. (1991). The Original Description, Type Specimen and Status of the Colubrid Snake Boiga saengsomi Nutphand. In: Bulletin of the Maryland Herpetological Society. Vol. 27, Issue 3, pp. 157–165.
- Olivier Pauwels, Patrick David, Wirot Nutaphand, Chucheep Chimsunchart. (2001). First record of Xenochrophis punctulatus (Günther, 1858) (Serpentes: Colubridae: Natricinae) from Thailand. In: Hamadryad. Vol. 26, Issue 2, pp. 259–264.
