= Daniel Reyes (boxer) =

Colombian boxer (born 1972)

Personal information
- Nickname: El Olímpico
- Nationality: Colombian
- Born: Daniel Reyes Torres; 5 May 1972 (age 54) Cartagena de Indias, Colombia
- Height: 1.52 m (5 ft 0 in)
- Weight: Minimumweight; Flyweight

Boxing career
- Reach: 165 cm (65 in)
- Stance: Orthodox

Boxing record
- Total fights: 48
- Wins: 40
- Win by KO: 30
- Losses: 7
- Draws: 1

Daniel Antonio Reyes Torres (born 5 May 1972) is a Colombian former professional boxer who competed from 1996 to 2009. He held the IBF minimumweight title from 2003 to 2004. As an amateur, he competed at the 1996 Summer Olympics.

== Amateur career ==
Reyes represented Colombia as a Flyweight at the 1996 Olympic Games in Atlanta. His results were:

- Defeated Tebebu Behonebn (Ethiopia) 16-2
- Defeated Khaled Falah (Syria) 15-13
- Lost to Albert Pakeyev (Russia) 13-13

== Professional career ==
Reyes turned professional in 1996 and won the IBF World Strawweight Championship by a TKO over Edgar Cárdenas in 2003. He lost his belt in 2004 by split decision to Muhammad Rachman.

== Professional boxing record ==
48 fights	40 wins	7 losses
By knockout	30	3
By decision	10	4
Draws	1	

No.	Result	Record	Opponent	Type	Round, time	Date	Location	Notes
48	Loss	40–7–1	César Seda	TKO	2 (10), 1:30	4 Dec 2009	Auditorio Juan Pachín Vicéns, Ponce, Puerto Rico	
47	Loss	40–6–1	Manuel Vargas	KO	4 (12), 0:56	6 Dec 2008	Palenque de la Feria, Lagos de Moreno, Mexico	Lost WBO interim minimumweight title
46	Win	40–5–1	Luis Alberto Lazarte	MD	12	26 Sep 2008	Ce.De.M. N° 2, Caseros, Argentina	Won vacant WBO interim minimumweight title
45	Win	39–5–1	Jhon Alberto Molina	UD	10	18 Aug 2007	Coliseo de Combate, Cartagena, Colombia	
44	Loss	38–5–1	Giovani Segura	KO	1 (12), 1:38	8 Jun 2007	Hudson & Campbell Center, Gary, Indiana, U.S.	For WBC–NABF light flyweight title
43	Win	38–4–1	Nelson Dieppa	SD	12	23 Mar 2007	José Miguel Agrelot Coliseum, San Juan, Puerto Rico	Won vacant WBA Fedelatin light flyweight title
42	Win	37–4–1	Nelson Cantero	UD	8	16 Sep 2006	Romelio Martínez Stadium, Barranquilla, Colombia	
41	Win	36–4–1	Alfonso De la Hoz	PTS	10	27 Apr 2006	Discoteca El Escandalo, Cartagena, Colombia	
40	Loss	35–4–1	Iván Calderón	UD	12	10 Dec 2005	Roberto Clemente Coliseum, San Juan, Puerto Rico	For WBO minimumweight title
39	Win	35–3–1	Valentin Leon	TKO	6 (12), 2:12	7 Oct 2005	Miccosukee Resort & Gaming, Miami, Florida, U.S.	Won vacant WBC Latino flyweight title
38	Loss	34–3–1	Omar Soto	UD	12	25 Feb 2005	The Orleans, Las Vegas, Nevada, U.S.	
37	Loss	34–2–1	Muhammad Rachman	SD	12	14 Sep 2004	The BritAma Arena, Jakarta, Indonesia	Lost IBF minimumweight title
36	Win	34–1–1	Roberto Carlos Leyva	TKO	3 (12), 2:23	10 Apr 2004	Hilton Hotel de Bocagrande, Cartagena, Colombia	Retained IBF minimumweight title
35	Win	33–1–1	Edgar Cárdenas	TKO	6 (12), 2:40	4 Oct 2003	Staples Center, Los Angeles, California, U.S.	Won IBF minimumweight title
34	Win	32–1–1	Ronald Lopez	KO	1	25 Apr 2003	Coliseo Elias Chegwin, Barranquilla, Colombia	
33	Win	31–1–1	Farid Cassiani	TKO	5 (8)	4 Apr 2003	Coliseo Elias Chegwin, Barranquilla, Colombia	
32	Draw	30–1–1	Jesus Jose Ospino	TD	2 (10)	13 Dec 2002	Coliseo Elias Chegwin, Barranquilla, Colombia	
31	Win	30–1	Over Bolanos	KO	5 (10)	1 Nov 2002	Polideportivo San Felipe, Barranquilla, Colombia	
30	Win	29–1	Farid Cassiani	KO	5 (8)	14 Sep 2002	Hilton Hotel, Cartagena, Colombia	
29	Win	28–1	Jose Humberto Caraballo	KO	2	17 Jun 2002	Barranquilla, Colombia	
28	Win	27–1	Over Bolanos	KO	2 (8)	17 Dec 2001	Cartagena, Colombia	
27	Win	26–1	Ilson Diaz	KO	2	21 Sep 2001	Barranquilla, Colombia	
26	Loss	25–1	Roberto Carlos Leyva	UD	12	29 Apr 2001	Club Amazura, New York City, New York, U.S.	For vacant IBF minimumweight title
25	Win	25–0	Alberto Rossel	TKO	4 (10)	17 Mar 2000	Cartagena, Colombia	
24	Win	24–0	Édgar Velásquez	UD	10	16 Oct 1999	Salon Jumbo del Country Club, Barranquilla, Colombia	
23	Win	23–0	Julio Viloria	KO	2	14 Aug 1999	Barranquilla, Colombia	
22	Win	22–0	Gustavo Vera	TKO	2	21 May 1999	Cartagena, Colombia	
21	Win	21–0	Francisco Bolanos	TKO	5	19 Feb 1999	Sincelejo, Colombia	
20	Win	20–0	Carlos Guerrero	KO	2	11 Dec 1998	Santa Marta, Colombia	
19	Win	19–0	Francisco Bolanos	TKO	5	1 Nov 1998	San Juan de Urabá, Colombia	
18	Win	18–0	Jose Luis Bolanos	KO	3	4 Sep 1998	Valledupar, Colombia	
17	Win	17–0	Juan Herrera	PTS	10	6 Jun 1998	Cartagena, Colombia	
16	Win	16–0	Elvis Ibarra	KO	2	25 Apr 1998	Santa Marta, Colombia	
15	Win	15–0	Ceferino Sanchez	PTS	8	19 Apr 1998	Coliseo Bernardo Caraballo, Cartagena, Colombia	
14	Win	14–0	Joel Garcia	TKO	6	20 Dec 1997	Cartagena, Colombia	
13	Win	13–0	Alfredo Toro	TKO	6	12 Dec 1997	Coliseo Bernardo Caraballo, Cartagena, Colombia	
12	Win	12–0	Henry Casarrubia	TKO	4 (12)	23 Oct 1997	Cartagena, Colombia	Retained Colombian minimumweight title
11	Win	11–0	Pedro Rodriguez	TKO	7	9 Oct 1997	Cartagena, Colombia	
10	Win	10–0	Henry Casarrubia	TKO	3	13 Jun 1997	Arjona, Colombia	
9	Win	9–0	Amer Rivera	KO	3	7 Jun 1997	Colombia	
8	Win	8–0	Luis Escarpeta	TKO	6 (12)	23 May 1997	Cartagena, Colombia	Won vacant Colombian minimumweight title
7	Win	7–0	Jose Castaneda	KO	3	26 Apr 1997	Jamundí, Colombia	
6	Win	6–0	Francisco Bolanos	TKO	3	11 Apr 1997	Arboletes, Colombia	
5	Win	5–0	Roberto Tamara	KO	2	7 Mar 1997	Cartagena, Colombia	
4	Win	4–0	Giovanni Munoz	TKO	3	14 Feb 1997	Cartagena, Colombia	
3	Win	3–0	Julio Moreno	PTS	6	31 Jan 1997	Cartagena, Colombia	
2	Win	2–0	Bernabe Franco	PTS	4	27 Dec 1996	San Onofre, Colombia	
1	Win	1–0	Fidel Julio	TKO	3 (4)	20 Dec 1996	Cartagena, Colombia	

Preceded by Edgar Cardenas	IBF Minimumweight Champion; 2003 Oct 4 – 2004 Sep 14	Succeeded by Muhammad Rachman
