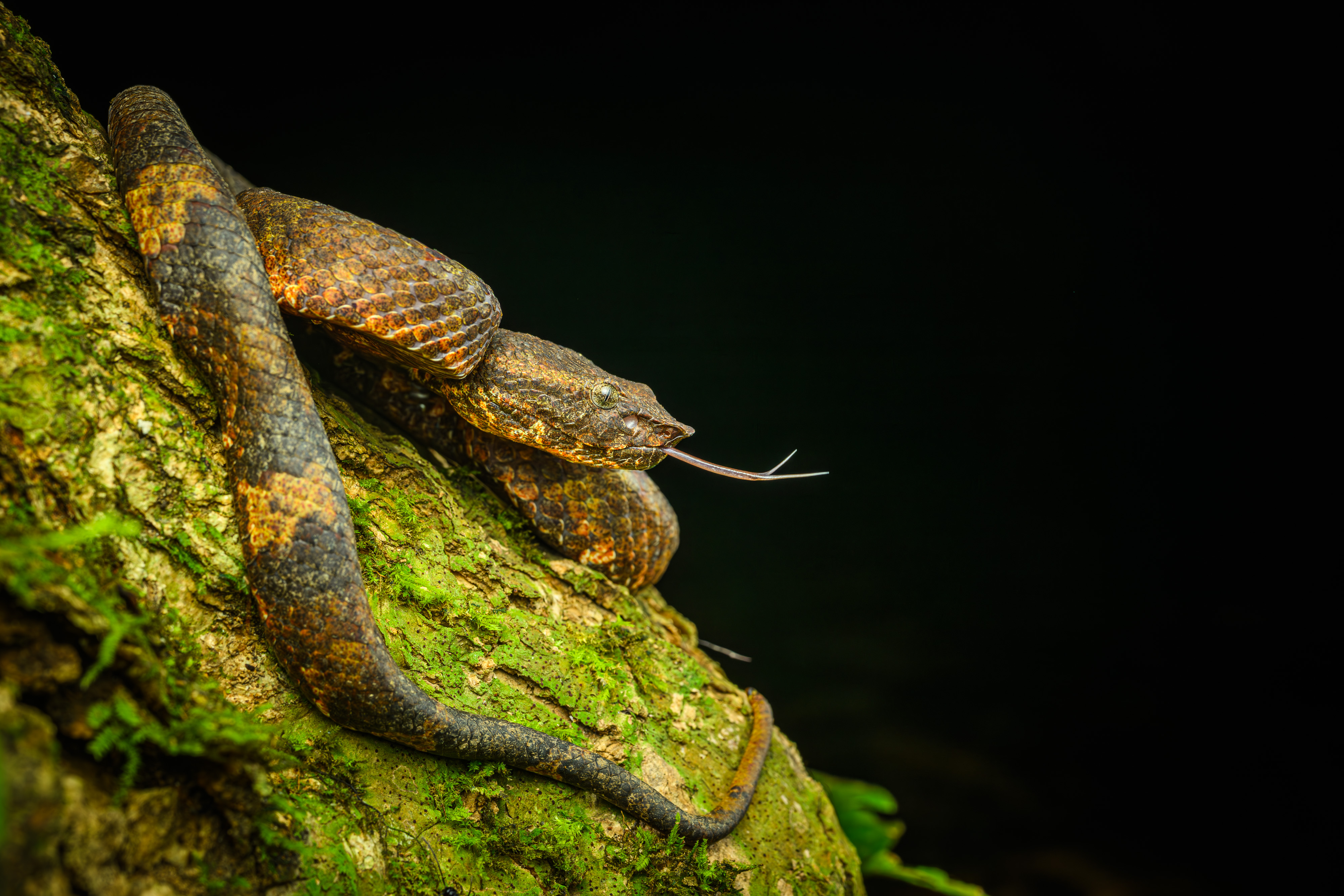

Conservation status
- Least Concern (IUCN 3.1)

Scientific classification
- Kingdom: Animalia
- Phylum: Chordata
- Class: Reptilia
- Order: Squamata
- Suborder: Serpentes
- Family: Viperidae
- Genus: Craspedocephalus
- Species: C. wiroti

Binomial name
- Craspedocephalus wiroti Trutnau, 1981

Synonyms
- Trimeresurus wiroti Trutnau, 1981; Trimeresurus (Craspedocephalus) wiroti — David et al., 2011; Craspedocephalus wiroti — Wallach et al., 2014

= Craspedocephalus wiroti =

Species of snake

Craspedocephalus wiroti, also known commonly as Wirot's pit viper, is a species of venomous pitviper in the family Viperidae. The species is native to Southeast Asia.

== Etymology ==
The specific name, wiroti, is in honor of Thai herpetologist Wirot Nutaphand (1932–2005).

== Geographic range ==
C. wiroti is found in Peninsular Malaysia and Thailand.

== Habitat ==
The preferred natural habitat of C. wiroti is forest, at altitudes from sea level to 1,200 m (3,900 ft).

== Behavior ==
C. wiroti is arboreal.

== Reproduction ==
C. wiroti is oviparous.
