= Boiga saengsomi =

Conservation status
- Endangered (IUCN 3.1)

Scientific classification
- Kingdom: Animalia
- Phylum: Chordata
- Class: Reptilia
- Order: Squamata
- Suborder: Serpentes
- Family: Colubridae
- Genus: Boiga
- Species: B. saengsomi

Binomial name
- Boiga saengsomi Nutphand, 1985

Species of snake

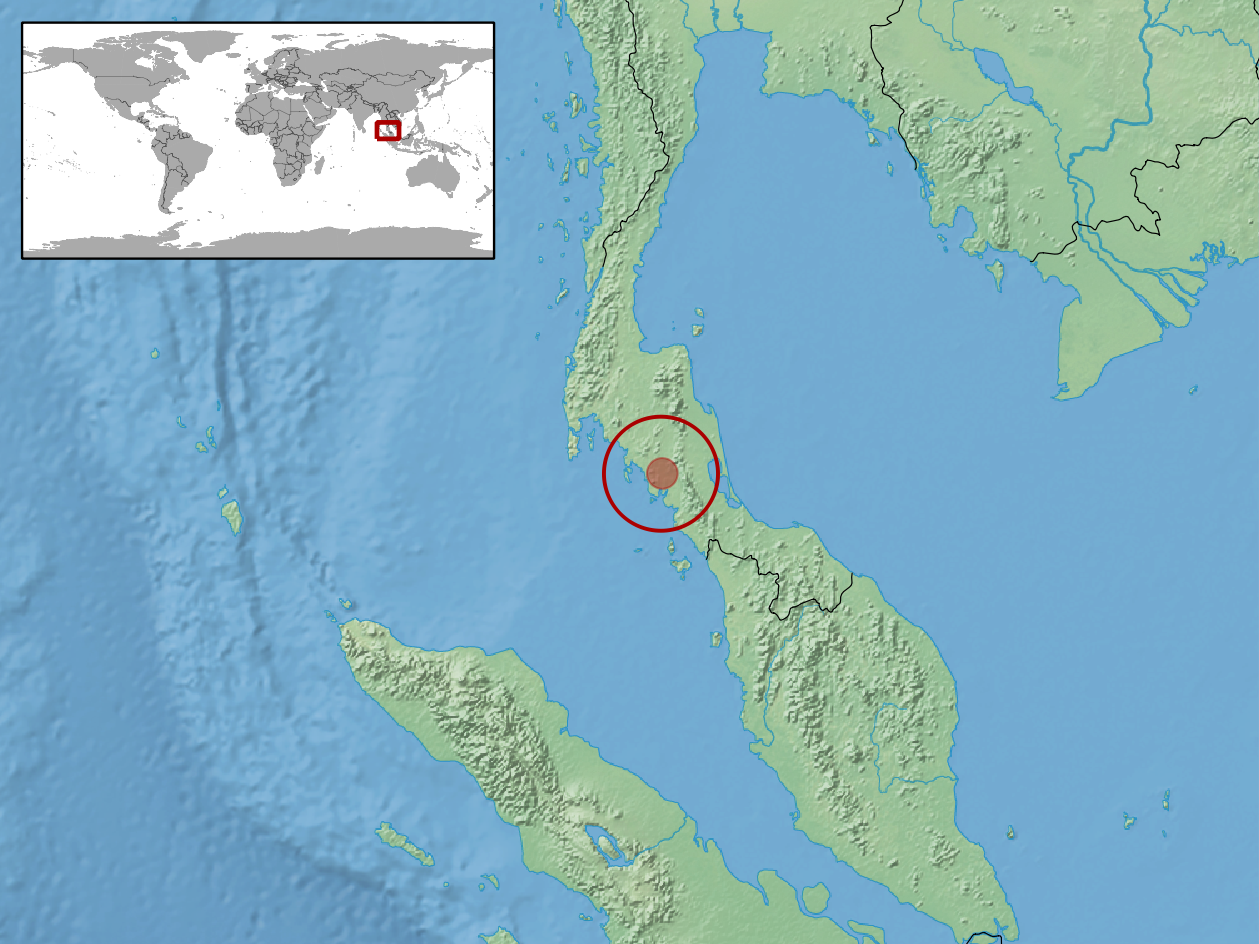
Geographic distribution of the snake species.

Boiga saengsomi is a species of snake in the family Colubridae. The species is endemic to Thailand.

== Etymology ==
The specific name, saengsomi, is in honor of Buntot Saengmahasom who is a Thai animal collector.

== Geographic range ==
B. saengsomi is found in southern Thailand.

== Habitat ==
The preferred natural habitat of B. saengsomi is forest.

== Reproduction ==
B. saengsomi is oviparous.
