= Edgar Cárdenas =

Mexican boxer (born 1974)

Personal information
- Nickname: Tun Tun
- Born: 16 September 1974 (age 51) Villa Nicolás Romero, Distrito Federal, Mexico
- Height: 1.67 m (5 ft 6 in)
- Weight: Bantamweight; Flyweight; Minimumweight

Boxing career
- Reach: 178 cm (70 in)
- Stance: Orthodox

Boxing record
- Total fights: 44
- Wins: 30
- Win by KO: 16
- Losses: 12
- Draws: 2

Edgar Cárdenas (born 16 September 1974) is a Mexican former professional boxer who competed from 1991 to 2004. He is a former WBC Continental Americas light flyweight, WBO NABO light flyweight, and the IBF minimumweight champion.

== Professional career ==
In December 2000, Edgar won the WBO NABO light flyweight title with a seventh round T.K.O. of veteran Alfredo Virgen.

=== IBF Minimumweight title ===
On 31 May 2003 Cárdenas won the IBF minimumweight title by upsetting an undefeated Miguel Barrera; Barrera would never fight again.

Preceded by Miguel Barrera	IBF Minimumweight Champion; 31 May 2003– 4 October 2003	Succeeded by Daniel Reyes

== Professional boxing record ==
44 fights	30 wins	12 losses
By knockout	16	5
By decision	11	7
By disqualification	3	0
Draws	2	

No.	Result	Record	Opponent	Type	Round, time	Date	Location	Notes
44	Loss	30–12–2	(Puerto Rico) Iván Calderón	KO	11 (12), 1:33	20 Mar 2004	Mario Morales Coliseum, Guaynabo, Puerto Rico	For WBO mini flyweight title
43	Loss	30–11–2	(Colombia) Daniel Reyes	TKO	6 (12), 2:40	4 Oct 2003	(United States) Staples Center, Los Angeles, California, U.S.	Lost IBF mini flyweight title
42	Win	30–10–2	(Colombia) Miguel Barrera	KO	10 (12), 1:46	31 May 2003	Auditorio Fausto Gutierrez Moreno, Tijuana, Mexico	Won IBF mini flyweight title
41	Win	29–10–2	(Mexico) Paulino Villalobos	UD	8	22 Feb 2003	Plaza de Toros México, Mexico City, Mexico	
40	Win	28–10–2	(Mexico) Marino Montiel	UD	12	1 Nov 2002	Deportivo Tlalli, Tlalnepantla de Baz, Mexico	Won vacant Mexican light flyweight title
39	Win	27–10–2	(Mexico) Guadalupe Arce	TKO	2 (10)	12 Jul 2002	Auditorio del Estado, Mexicali, Mexico	
38	Win	26–10–2	(Mexico) Alejandro Padilla	KO	2 (10)	14 Jun 2002	Deportivo Tlalli, Tlalnepantla de Baz, Mexico	
37	Loss	25–10–2	(Mexico) Gabriel Munoz	PTS	10	16 Nov 2001	Mexicali, Mexico	
36	Draw	25–9–2	(Mexico) Luis Valdez	TD	4 (?)	17 Aug 2001	Ensenada, Mexico	
35	Loss	25–9–1	(Denmark) Jesper Jensen	UD	12	18 Feb 2000	Aalborghallen, Aalborg, Denmark	
34	Loss	25–8–1	(Mexico) Alejandro Montiel	TKO	10 (12)	7 Aug 1999	(United States) Miccosukee Resort & Gaming, Miami, Florida, U.S.	For WBC Continental Americas flyweight title
33	Win	25–7–1	(Mexico) Leonardo Gutierrez	UD	8	12 Jun 1999	(United States) State Fair Pavilion, Albuquerque, New Mexico, U.S.	
32	Loss	24–7–1	(Mexico) Osvaldo Guerrero	PTS	12	24 Apr 1999	Mexico City, Mexico	Lost WBC Continental Americas light flyweight title
31	Win	24–6–1	(Mexico) Juan Alfonso Keb Baas	PTS	12	28 Nov 1998	Mexico City, Mexico	Retained WBC Continental Americas light flyweight title
30	Win	23–6–1	(Mexico) Juan Bautista	TKO	9 (12)	16 Sep 1998	Arena México, Mexico City, Mexico	Retained WBC Continental Americas light flyweight title
29	Win	22–6–1	(Mexico) Alfredo Virgen	PTS	12	27 Jun 1998	Mexico City, Mexico	Won WBC Continental Americas light flyweight title
28	Win	21–6–1	(Mexico) Jose Luis Velarde	UD	12	20 Apr 1998	Auditorio Fausto Gutierrez Moreno, Tijuana, Mexico	
27	Win	20–6–1	(Mexico) Santana Ramirez	TKO	2 (?)	2 Mar 1998	Mexico City, Mexico	
26	Win	19–6–1	(Mexico) Diego Andrade	PTS	10	15 Nov 1997	Mexico City, Mexico	
25	Win	18–6–1	(Puerto Rico) José de Jesús	DQ	6 (?)	30 Aug 1997	San Juan, Puerto Rico	
24	Win	17–6–1	(Mexico) Francisco Garcia	TKO	6 (12)	21 Jun 1997	Mexico City, Mexico	Won vacant Mexican light flyweight title
23	Win	16–6–1	(Puerto Rico) Alex Sánchez	MD	10	22 Feb 1997	Condado, Puerto Rico	
22	Win	15–6–1	(Dominican Republic) Domingo Guillen	KO	4 (12)	11 Aug 1996	Santo Domingo, Dominican Republic	Retained WBO–NABO light flyweight title
21	Win	14–6–1	(Mexico) Ruben Contreras	TKO	1 (?)	5 Jul 1996	Ciudad Juárez, Mexico	
20	Win	13–6–1	(Mexico) Alfredo Virgen	KO	7 (12)	31 May 1996	Guadalajara, Mexico	Won vacant WBO–NABO light flyweight title
19	Loss	12–6–1	(Nicaragua) Adonis Cruz	PTS	12	4 Feb 1996	Managua, Nicaragua	For WBC FECARBOX super flyweight title
18	Loss	12–5–1	(Mexico) Víctor Burgos	PTS	12	24 Oct 1995	Tijuana, Mexico	Lost Mexican light flyweight title
17	Win	12–4–1	(Mexico) Martin Felix	TKO	4 (12)	18 Aug 1995	Ciudad Juárez, Mexico	Retained Mexican light flyweight title
16	Win	11–4–1	(Mexico) Jesús Chong	DQ	9 (12)	19 May 1995	Tlalnepantla de Baz, Mexico	Won Mexican light flyweight title
15	Win	10–4–1	(Mexico) Justo Zuniga	RTD	2 (12), 3:00	15 Apr 1995	Tlalnepantla de Baz, Mexico	Won vacant WBC–NABF light flyweight title
14	Win	9–4–1	(Mexico) Victor Villanueva	KO	7 (10), 1:14	25 Feb 1995	Mexico City, Mexico	
13	Win	8–4–1	(Mexico) Rafael Orozco	DQ	3 (?)	3 Dec 1994	Mexico City, Mexico	
12	Loss	7–4–1	(Mexico) Jesús Chong	PTS	12	15 Oct 1994	Cuautla, Mexico	For Mexican light flyweight title
11	Win	7–3–1	(Mexico) Victor Villanueva	KO	7 (?)	13 Aug 1994	Mérida, Mexico	
10	Loss	6–3–1	(Mexico) Alfredo Virgen	TKO	5 (?)	28 May 1994	Mexico City, Mexico	
9	Win	6–2–1	(Mexico) Diner Ruiz	KO	2 (?)	9 Apr 1994	Mexico City, Mexico	
8	Win	5–2–1	(Mexico) Valerio Sanchez	TKO	6 (?)	5 Feb 1994	Mexico City, Mexico	
7	Win	4–2–1	(Mexico) Cruz Zamora	PTS	6	6 Nov 1993	Mexico City, Mexico	
6	Win	3–2–1	(Mexico) Cruz Zamora	PTS	6	24 Jul 1993	Mexico City, Mexico	
5	Win	2–2–1	(Mexico) Erik Lopez	KO	1 (?)	17 Apr 1993	Mexico City, Mexico	
4	Win	1–2–1	(Mexico) Valentin Romero	SD	4	14 Nov 1992	Mexico City, Mexico	
3	Loss	0–2–1	(Mexico) Pedro Alderete	PTS	4	17 Jul 1992	Mexico City, Mexico	
2	Draw	0–1–1	(Mexico) Oscar Vargas	PTS	4	18 Jan 1992	Mexico City, Mexico	
1	Loss	0–1	(Mexico) Osvaldo Guerrero	TKO	3 (?)	5 Oct 1991	Arena Coliseo, Mexico City, Mexico	

== See also ==
- List of Mexican boxing world champions
- List of IBF world champions
- List of Minimumweight boxing champions

Achievements
Vacant Title last held by Miguel Barrera	IBF minimumweight champion May 31, 2003 – October 4, 2003	Succeeded by Daniel Reyes
