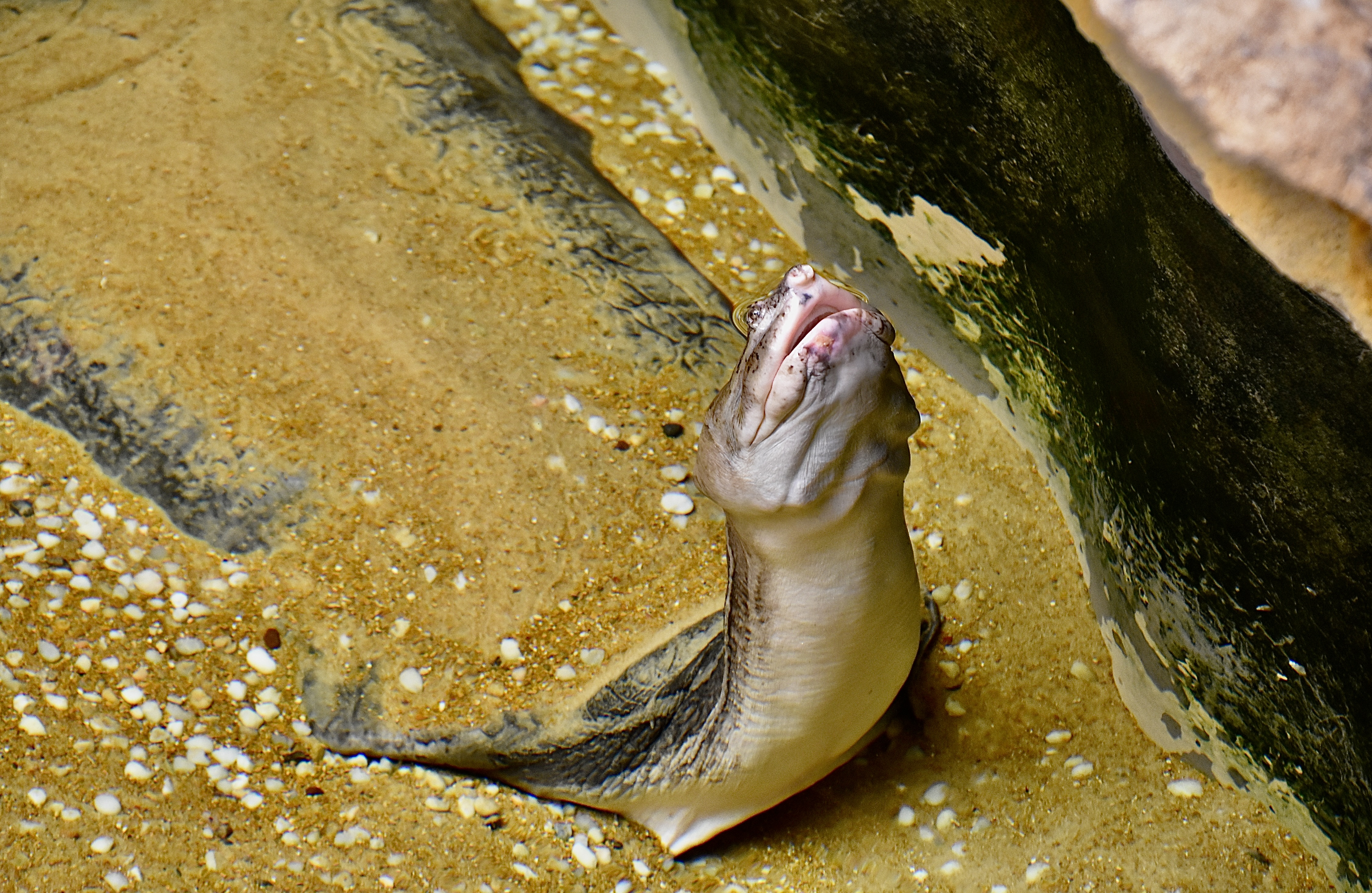
- An Asian narrow-headed softshell turtle (Chitra chitra) at St. Louis Zoo.

Conservation status
- Critically Endangered (IUCN 3.1)
- CITES Appendix I

Scientific classification
- Kingdom: Animalia
- Phylum: Chordata
- Class: Reptilia
- Order: Testudines
- Suborder: Cryptodira
- Family: Trionychidae
- Genus: Chitra
- Species: C. chitra

Binomial name
- Chitra chitra Nutaphand, 1986

Synonyms
- Chitra chitra chitra: Chitra chitra Nutaphand, 1986; Chitra chitra chitra McCord & Pritchard, 2003; Chitra chitra javanensis: Chitra selenkae Jaekel, 1911 (nomen suppressum); Chitra chitra javanensis McCord & Pritchard, 2003; Chitra chitra javanica Iskandar & Mumpuni, 2003 (ex errore); Chitra chitra javaensis Artner, 2003 (ex errore)

= Asian narrow-headed softshell turtle =

Species of turtle

The Asian narrow-headed softshell turtle (Chitra chitra), also known commonly as Nutaphand's narrowhead softshell, is a large species of softshell turtle in the family Trionychidae. The species is endemic to Southeast Asia. There are two recognized subspecies.

== Taxonomy ==
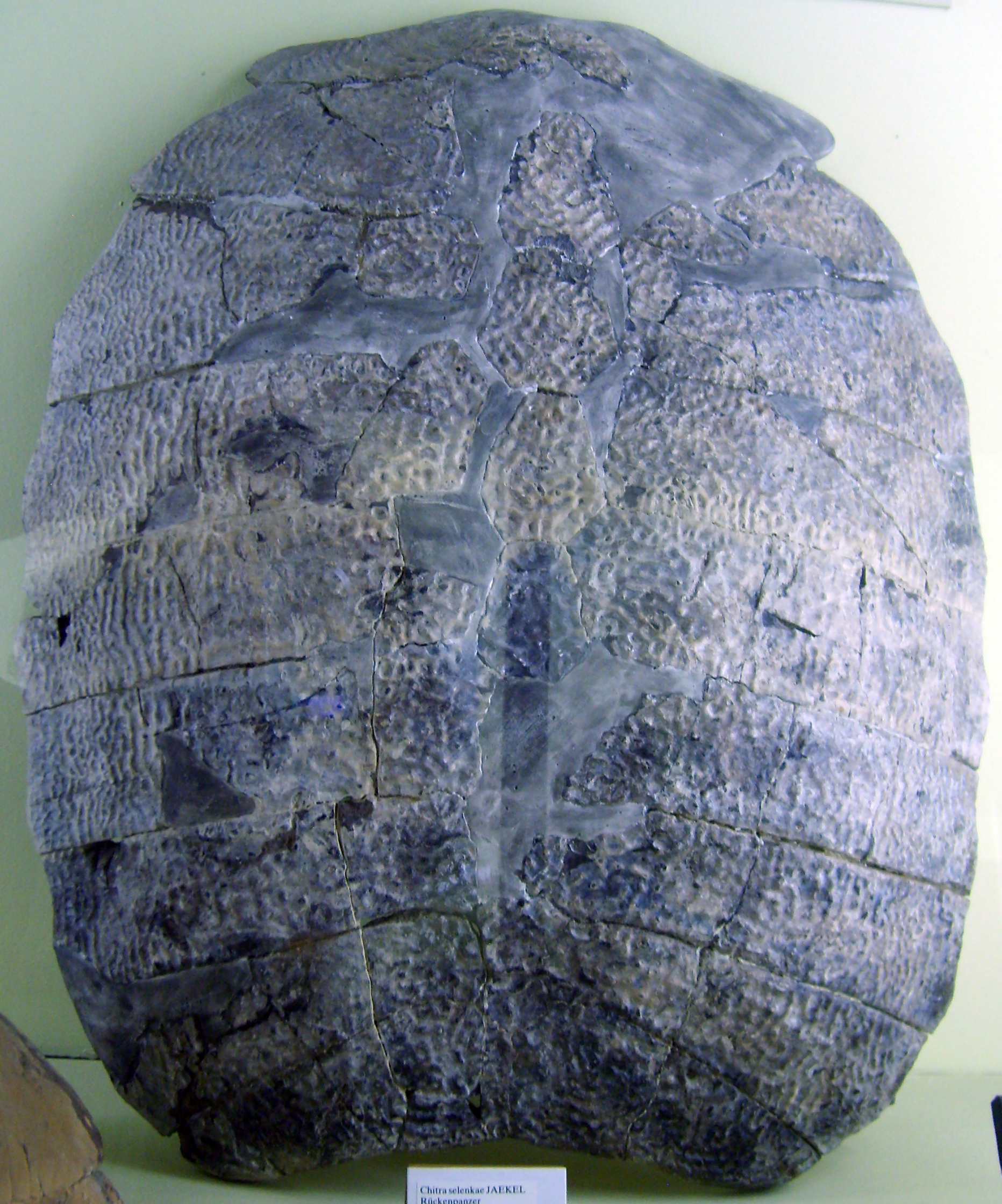
Fossil carapace originally named C. selenkae, Museum für Naturkunde, Berlin

There are two recognized subspecies:

- Chitra chitra chitra Nutaphand, 1986 – Malaysia, Thailand
- Chitra chitra javanensis McCord & Pritchard, 2003 – Java, Sumatra

The nominotypical subspecies, Chitra chitra chitra was first described by Wirot Nutaphand in 1986, then simply as Chitra chitra. The type locality, as restricted by William P. McCord and Peter Pritchard in 2003, is where the Khwae Noi River and the Khwae Yai River join to form the Mae Klong River, in Kanchanaburi, Thailand. The name chitra – used for the genus by John Edward Gray already in 1844 – is derived from the Sanskrit/Bengali word meaning 'beautiful, bright, picturesque', referring to the markings on the turtle's carapace and extremities.

McCord and Pritchard split the species into its two subspecies in 2003 by describing Chitra chitra javenensis. The type locality was given as "Pasuruan River drainage, near Pasuruan, Probolinggo District, East Java, Indonesia"; however, Djoko Iskandar argued in 2004 that this was in error, and that the actual type locality was in Bojonegoro District, at the Bengawan River between Kalitidu and Padangan.

When splitting the species into two subspecies, McCord and Pritchard discovered that a fossil that Otto Jaekel used to describe Chitra selenkae in 1911 was in fact a member of Chitra chitra, which normally would mean that, by the principle of priority, the species would assume the name selenkae; however, in the interest of nomenclatural stability, the International Commission on Zoological Nomenclature were petitioned to suppress the name Chitra chitra – the petition was successful.

== Description ==
Chitra chitra can reach a straight carapace length of 1.4 m (4 ft 7 in). Females reach sexually maturity at 15 years old.

== Distribution and habitat ==
Chitra chitra chitra is found in Malaysia and Thailand, on the Malay Peninsula. Chitra chitra javanensis is found in Indonesia, on the islands of Java and Sumatra. They inhabit freshwater rivers and their tributaries.
