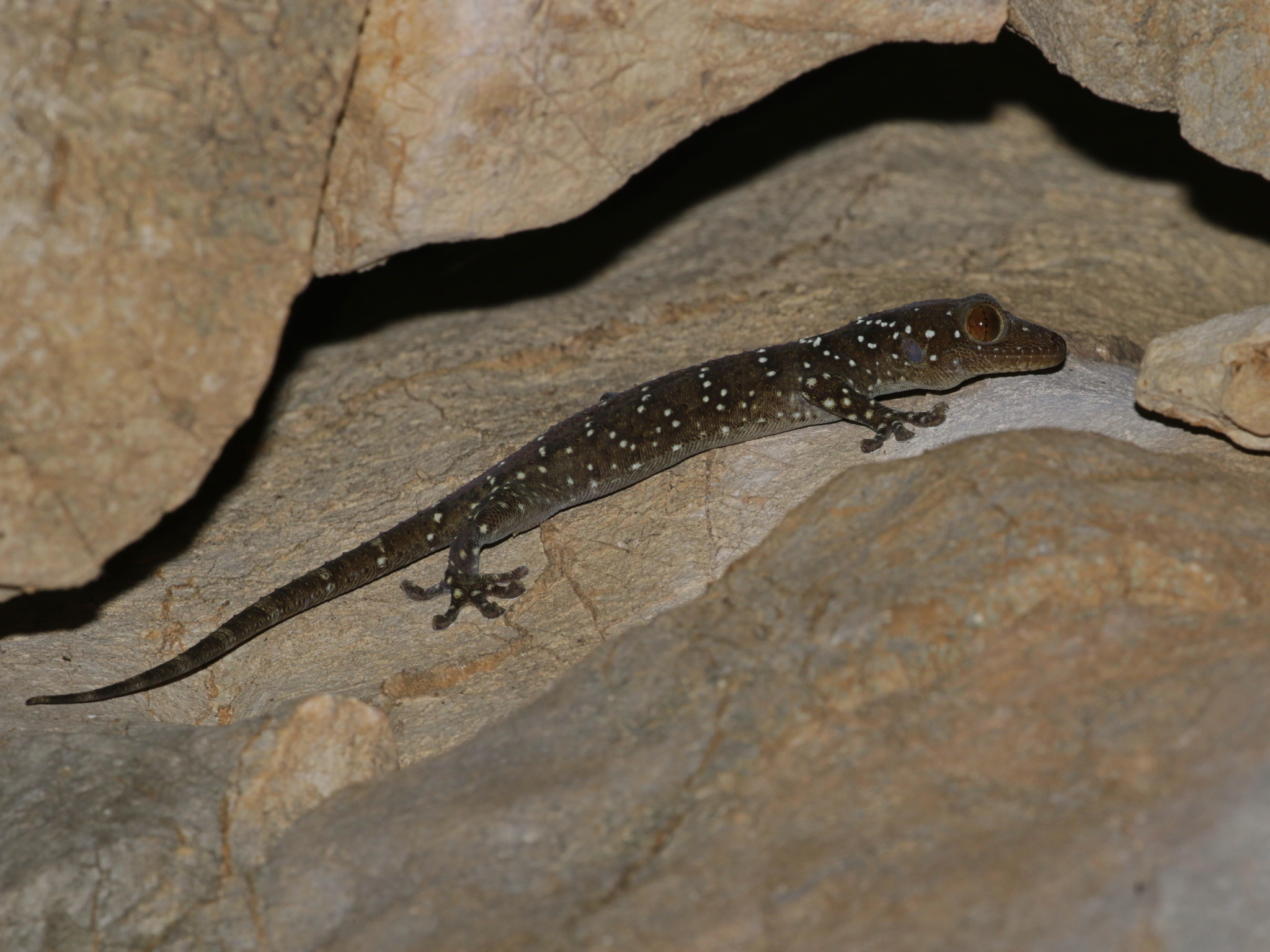

Conservation status
- Least Concern (IUCN 3.1)

Scientific classification
- Kingdom: Animalia
- Phylum: Chordata
- Class: Reptilia
- Order: Squamata
- Suborder: Gekkota
- Family: Gekkonidae
- Genus: Gekko
- Species: G. nutaphandi

Binomial name
- Gekko nutaphandi Bauer, Sumontha & Pauwels, 2008

Synonyms
- Gekko nutaphandi Bauer, Sumontha & Pauwels, 2008; Gekko (Gekko) nutaphandi — Wood et al., 2019

= Gekko nutaphandi =

Species of lizard

Gekko nutaphandi is a species of gecko, a lizard in the family Gekkonidae. The species is endemic to Thailand.

== Etymology ==
The specific name, nutaphandi, is in honor of Thai herpetologist Wirot Nutaphand (1932–2005).

== Geographic range ==
Gekko nutaphandi is found in Kanchanaburi Province, central western Thailand.

== Habitat ==
The preferred natural habitats of Gekko nutaphandi are limestone caves and the surrounding forest.

== Description ==
Medium-sized for its genus, Gekko nutaphandi may attain a snout-to-vent length (SVL) of at 12 cm (4.7 in) or more. It has 14 rows of dorsal tubercles. The precloacal pores number 17–22 and are arranged in an uninterrupted series. The iris of the eye is red.

== Reproduction ==
Gekko nutaphandi is oviparous.
