= Jesús Chong =

Mexican boxer (born 1965)

Personal information
- Nickname: El Tigre
- Born: Jesús Alberto Chong; 7 January 1965 (age 61) Gómez Palacio, Durango, Mexico
- Height: 1.60 m (5 ft 3 in)
- Weight: Light flyweight

Boxing career
- Reach: 168 cm (66 in)
- Stance: Orthodox

Boxing record
- Total fights: 48
- Wins: 32
- Win by KO: 28
- Losses: 16
- Draws: 0
- No contests: 0

Jesús Alberto Chong (born 7 January 1965) is a Mexican former professional boxer. He is a former Mexican National, NABF, and the WBO Light Flyweight Champion.

== Early life and amateur career ==
Chong was born in Gómez Palacio, Durango, as one of 13 siblings. His father, Salvador, was a boxer and a football referee. Chong is of Chinese Mexican heritage.

Chong fought close to 150 amateur fights. He failed to qualify for the 1988 Summer Olympics, which motivated him to turn pro.

== Professional career ==
Chong made his professional debut on September 1, 1987. In just his 11th fight in 1990, he lost a close eight-round decision to future five-time champion Johnny Tapia. Later in that same year he won his first world title, the International Boxing Council (IBC) Championship against Francisco Montiel. In 1991, he lost to five-time champion Michael Carbajal by unanimous decision.

=== NABF Light Flyweight title ===
In September 1992 he beat Porfirio Danny Núnez to defend his NABF Light Flyweight Championship, that he won by beating Francisco Montiel in a rematch earlier that year.

=== Mexican Light Flyweight title ===
He won the Mexican Light Flyweight Championship by upsetting veteran Raul Rios by T.K.O. in tenth round, and would go on to make 9 defences of his National Championship. Chong defended the title until 1995 when he lost to Edgar Cárdenas via disqualification.

=== WBO Light Flyweight title ===
On May 31, 1997, at Caesars Palace in Las Vegas, Chong won the WBO Light Flyweight title by defeating Eric Griffin with a second round T.K.O. He would go on to lose his title in a twelve-round decision to Melchor Cob Castro. Castro was docked two points during the fight for low blows against Chong.

=== Retirement ===
Chong went on to lose nine of his last ten fights, with his only win being against Jaime Parga, whom unfortunately died due to injuries sustained in the bour. Chong decided to retire in 2003 at the age of 38.

== Professional boxing record ==
48 fights	32 wins	16 losses
By knockout	28	3
By decision	3	12
By disqualification	1	1

No.	Result	Record	Opponent	Type	Round, time	Date	Location	Notes
38	Loss	32–16	Rafael Chávez	UD	10	1 Jan 2003	El Palenque, Gómez Palacio, Mexico	
37	Win	32–15	Jaime Parga	KO	9 (10)	8 Nov 2002	Ciudad Acuña, Coahuila de Zaragosa, Mexico	
36	Loss	31–15	Francisco Soto	KO	5 (12)	15 Mar 2002	Los Mochis, Sinaloa, Mexico	
45	Loss	31–14	Gerson Guerrero	PTS	8	30 Jun 2000	Ciudad Juárez, Chihuahua, Mexico	
44	Loss	31–13	Linglom Por Tawatchai	PTS	12	31 Mar 2000	Bangkok, Thailand	For WBF light-flyweight title
43	Loss	31–12	Raúl Juárez	TKO	3 (10), 2:40	11 Sep 1999	Arena México, Mexico City, Mexico	
42	Loss	31–11	Óscar Andrade	TKO	7	18 Jun 1999	Victoria de Durango, Durango, Mexico	
41	Loss	31–10	Isidro García	UD	12	5 Oct 1998	Arrowhead Pond, Anaheim, California, U.S.	For WBO-NABO flyweight title
40	Loss	31–9	Tomás Rivera	UD	10	20 Apr 1998	Great Western Forum, Inglewood, California, U.S.	
39	Loss	31–8	Melchor Cob Castro	UD	12	25 Aug 1997	Great Western Forum, Inglewood, California, U.S.	Lost WBO light-flyweight title
38	Win	31–7	Eric Griffin	TKO	2 (12), 2:13	31 May 1997	Caesars Palace, Paradise, Nevada, U.S.	Won vacant WBO light-flyweight title
37	Win	30–7	Diego Andrade	TKO	10	1 Jan 1997	Gómez Palacio, Durango, Mexico	
36	Win	29–7	Eric Griffin	KO	7 (12), 1:08	16 Apr 1996	Casino Magic, Bay St. Louis, Mississippi, U.S.	Won WBC-NABF light-flyweight title
35	Loss	28–7	Jakkrit LG-Gym	PTS	12	21 Oct 1995	Nong Khai, Nong Khai Province, Thailand	Lost WBF light-flyweight title
34	Win	28–6	Sairung Singwancha	KO	9 (12)	16 Jul 1995	Ayutthaya, Ayutthaya Province, Thailand	Won WBF light-flyweight title
33	Loss	27–6	Edgar Cárdenas	DQ	9 (12)	19 May 1995	Tlalnepantla, México, Mexico	Lost Mexican light-flyweight title
32	Win	27–5	Raúl Ríos	KO	3 (12)	25 Nov 1994	Mexico City, Distrito Federal, Mexico	Retained Mexican light-flyweight title
31	Win	26–5	Edgar Cárdenas	PTS	12	15 Oct 1994	Cuautla, Morelos, Mexico	Retained Mexican light-flyweight title
30	Win	25–5	Óscar Calzada	TKO	7 (12)	2 Sep 1994	Ciudad Juárez, Chihuahua, Mexico	Retained Mexican light-flyweight title
29	Win	24–5	Rafael Orozco	TKO	11 (12)	2 Jul 1994	Mexico City, Distrito Federal, Mexico	Retained Mexican light-flyweight title
28	Win	23–5	Iván Salazar	KO	6	29 Apr 1994	Ciudad Juárez, Chihuahua, Mexico	
27	Win	22–5	Javier Juárez	TKO	10 (12)	17 Dec 1993	Xalapa, Veracruz, Mexico	Retained Mexican light-flyweight title
26	Win	21–5	Gerardo García	TKO	8	28 Aug 1993	Mexico City, Distrito Federal, Mexico	Retained Mexican light-flyweight title
25	Win	20–5	Ismael Rodríguez	TKO	8	17 Jul 1993	Mexico City, Distrito Federal, Mexico	
24	Win	19–5	Raúl Ríos	TKO	10 (12)	5 Mar 1993	Culiacán, Sinaloa, Mexico	Won Mexican light-flyweight title
23	Win	18–5	Danny Núñez	TKO	7 (12), 1:40	4 Sep 1992	County Coliseum, El Paso, Texas, U.S.	Retained WBC-NABF light-flyweight title
22	Loss	17–5	Javier Juárez	PTS	12	30 May 1992	Auditorio Municipal, Torreón, Mexico	For vacant WBC Continental Americas light-flyweight title
21	Win	17–4	Victor Hernández	KO	2	1 May 1992	Ciudad Juárez, Chihuahua, Mexico	
20	Win	16–4	Francisco Montiel	TKO	11 (12), 1:47	24 Feb 1992	Great Western Forum, Inglewood, California, U.S.	Retained WBC-NABF light-flyweight title
19	Loss	15–4	Michael Carbajal	UD	10	18 Oct 1991	Convention Center, Atlantic City, New Jersey, U.S.	
18	Win	15–3	Daniel Humberto Lagos	KO	4 (10)	16 Sep 1991	Great Western Forum, Inglewood, California, U.S.	
17	Win	14–3	Cuauhtémoc Gómez	PTS	10	17 May 1991	Auditorio del Estado, Mexicali, Mexico	
16	Win	13–3	Jorge Luis Román	RTD	5 (12), 3:00	21 Mar 1991	Auditorio del Estado, Mexicali, Mexico	Won vacant WBC-NABF light-flyweight title
15	Loss	12–3	Ysaias Zamudio	UD	12	14 Jan 1991	Great Western Forum, Inglewood, California, U.S.	For WBC-NABF flyweight title
14	Win	12–2	Francisco Montiel	MD	12	13 Dec 1990	Rosemont Horizon, Rosemont, Illinois, U.S.	Won vacant IBC light-flyweight title
13	Win	11–2	Martín Llovera	DQ	6 (10)	6 Jul 1990	Amigos Indoor Soccer Stadium, Tucson, Arizona, U.S.	
12	Win	10–2	Óscar Calzada	TKO	3 (10)	27 Apr 1990	Amigos Indoor Soccer Stadium, Tucson, Arizona, U.S.	
11	Loss	9–2	Johnny Tapia	UD	8	16 Feb 1990	Hacienda Hotel, Paradise, Nevada, U.S.	
10	Loss	9–1	Justo Zúñiga	PTS	10	13 Oct 1989	Guadalajara, Jalisco, Mexico	
9	Win	9–0	Ismael Rodríguez	TKO	2	22 Sep 1989	Guadalajara, Jalisco, Mexico	
8	Win	8–0	Victor Alanís	TKO	7 (10)	5 May 1989	Arena Olímpico Laguna, Gómez Palacio, Mexico	
7	Win	7–0	Ricky Alvarado	KO	6	14 Apr 1989	Ciudad Juárez, Chihuahua, Mexico	
6	Win	6–0	Antonio Valdez	KO	2 (10)	1 Jan 1989	Arena Olímpico Laguna, Gómez Palacio, Mexico	
5	Win	5–0	Óscar Rodríguez	KO	6	18 Nov 1988	Gómez Palacio, Durango, Mexico	
4	Win	4–0	Manuel Zepien	KO	2	30 Sep 1988	Ciudad Juárez, Chihuahua, Mexico	
3	Win	3–0	Julián Huerta	KO	4	29 Apr 1988	Monterrey, Nuevo León, Mexico	
2	Win	2–0	Raúl López	KO	2	10 Jan 1988	Gómez Palacio, Durango, Mexico	
1	Win	1–0	José Olivera	KO	3	1 Sep 1987	Gómez Palacio, Durango, Mexico	

== See also ==
- List of Mexican boxing world champions
- List of light-flyweight boxing champions

Achievements
Vacant Title last held by Jacob Matlala	WBO light flyweight champion May 31, 1997 - August 25, 1997	Succeeded by Melchor Cob Castro
