= Roberto Carlos Leyva =

Mexican boxer

Personal information
- Nickname: Mako
- Born: Roberto Carlos Leyva Cortez; 27 October 1979 (age 46) Puerto Peñasco, Sonora, Mexico
- Height: 5 ft 6 in (168 cm)
- Weight: Mini flyweight; Light flyweight; Flyweight; Super flyweight; Bantamweight

Boxing career
- Reach: 66 in (168 cm)
- Stance: Southpaw

Boxing record
- Total fights: 43
- Wins: 27
- Win by KO: 21
- Losses: 15
- Draws: 1

Roberto Carlos Leyva Cortez (born 27 October 1979) is a Mexican former professional boxer who competed from 1998 to 2011. He held the International Boxing Federation (IBF) mini-flyweight title from 2001 to 2002.

== Professional career ==
Leyva turned professional in 1998 & compiled a record of 18–0 before facing & defeating Daniel Reyes to win the vacant IBF mini-flyweight title. He would lose the title to Colombian challenger Miguel Barrera. He would attempt to regain the title against Barrera but would also lose in the rematch. Leyva would get another shot at a world title when he faced Luis Concepción for the interim WBA flyweight title, Leyva would get stopped in the fourth round.

== Professional boxing record ==
43 fights	27 wins	15 losses
By knockout	21	9
By decision	6	5
By disqualification	0	1
Draws	1	

No.	Result	Record	Opponent	Type	Round, time	Date	Location	Notes
43	Loss	27–15–1	Wilfredo Vázquez Jr.	KO	3 (10)	2011-10-29	Mario Morales Coliseum, Guaynabo, Puerto Rico	
42	Loss	27–14–1	Jesus Lopez Armenta	UD	8 (8)	2011-10-21	Ciudad Morelos, Mexico	
41	Loss	27–13–1	Simpiwe Vetyeka	KO	3 (6)	2011-02-25	Million Dollar Elm Casino, Tulsa, Oklahoma, U.S.	
40	Loss	27–12–1	Édgar Sosa	KO	2 (10)	2010-06-05	Forum de Mundo Imperial, Acapulco, Mexico	
39	Loss	27–11–1	Juan José Montes	DQ	3 (10)	2010-04-03	Coliseo Olimpico de la U.G., Guadalajara, Mexico	For WBC Youth super-flyweight title
38	Loss	27–10–1	Luis Concepción	KO	4 (12)	2009-11-27	Roberto Durán Arena, Panama City, Panama	For interim WBA flyweight title
37	Win	27–9–1	Hector Cervantes Soriano	TKO	3 (8)	2009-09-05	Auditorio Fausto Gutierrez Moreno, Tijuana, Mexico	
36	Loss	26–9–1	Z Gorres	TKO	7 (12)	2009-03-14	Waterfront Cebu City Hotel & Casino, Cebu City, Philippines	For vacant WBO Oriental bantamweight title
35	Loss	26–8–1	Benjamin Garcia	UD	6 (6)	2008-09-11	4th and B, San Diego, California, U.S.	
34	Loss	26–7–1	Édgar Sosa	TKO	4 (12)	2007-11-24	Estadio Beto Ávila, Veracruz, Mexico	For WBC light-flyweight title
33	Win	26–6–1	Benito Abraham	UD	10 (10)	2007-09-28	Gimnasio Oscar 'Tigre' García, Ensenada, Mexico	
32	Win	25–6–1	Germán Meraz	UD	6 (6)	2007-07-09	Salon Las Pulgas, Tijuana, Mexico	
31	Win	24–6–1	Felipe Acosta	UD	6 (6)	2006-10-16	Auditorio Fausto Gutierrez Moreno, Tijuana, Mexico	
30	Loss	23–6–1	Julio César Miranda	TKO	7 (10)	2006-06-22	Gimnasio Oscar 'Tigre' García, Ensenada, Mexico	
29	Loss	23–5–1	Iván Hernández	MD	12 (12)	2006-04-21	Gimnasio Oscar 'Tigre' García, Ensenada, Mexico	For vacant NABF bantamweight title
28	Loss	23–4–1	Iván Calderón	UD	12 (12)	2004-07-31	MGM Grand Garden Arena, Paradise, Nevada, U.S.	For WBO mini-flyweight title
27	Win	23–3–1	Fred Heberto Valdez	TKO	4 (10)	2004-06-21	Discoteca Baby Rock, Tijuana, Mexico	
26	Loss	22–3–1	Daniel Reyes	TKO	3 (12)	2004-04-10	Hilton Hotel de Bocagrande, Cartagena, Colombia	For IBF mini-flyweight title
25	Win	22–2–1	Marino Montiel	TKO	5 (10)	2003-09-08	Discoteca Baby Rock, Tijuana, Mexico	
24	Loss	21–2–1	Miguel Barrera	KO	3 (12)	2003-03-22	Mandalay Bay Events Center, Paradise, Nevada, U.S.	For IBF mini-flyweight title
23	Loss	21–1–1	Miguel Barrera	UD	12 (12)	2002-08-09	The Orleans, Paradise, Nevada, U.S.	Lost IBF mini-flyweight title
22	Win	21–0–1	Manny Melchor	UD	10 (10)	2002-03-09	El Palenque, Aguascalientes, Mexico	
21	Win	20–0–1	Francisco Soto	TKO	5 (10)	2002-01-04	Gimnasio Oscar 'Tigre' García, Ensenada, Mexico	
20	Draw	19–0–1	Miguel Barrera	TD	3 (12)	2001-09-28	Gimnasio Oscar 'Tigre' García, Ensenada, Mexico	Retained IBF mini-flyweight title
19	Win	19–0	Daniel Reyes	UD	12 (12)	2001-04-29	Club Amazura, Queens, New York, U.S.	Won vacant IBF mini-flyweight title
18	Win	18–0	Martin Armenta Chaparro	TKO	4 (10)	2001-03-23	Tijuana, Mexico	Retained WBC Youth mini-flyweight title
17	Win	17–0	Víctor Burgos	TKO	8 (12)	2000-12-04	Jai Alai Frontón Palacio, Tijuana, Mexico	Won NABO light-flyweight title
16	Win	16–0	Luis Valdez	KO	4 (10)	2000-11-03	Ensenada, Mexico	Retained WBC Youth mini-flyweight title
15	Win	15–0	Roberto Gomez	UD	10 (10)	2000-08-04	Ensenada, Mexico	Retained WBC Youth mini-flyweight title
14	Win	14–0	Adel Gutierrez	TKO	4 (10)	2000-06-02	La Discoteca, Cancún, Mexico	Won vacant WBC Youth mini-flyweight title
13	Win	13–0	Aaron Sepulveda	TKO	2 (?)	2000-04-07	Auditorio Fausto Gutierrez Moreno, Tijuana, Mexico	
12	Win	12–0	Lorenzo Trejo	TKO	5 (?)	1999-12-16	Ensenada, Mexico	
11	Win	11–0	Miguel Juarez	TKO	2 (?)	1999-09-09	Mexico	
10	Win	10–0	Jose Luis Velarde	TKO	9 (?)	1999-07-20	Mexico	
9	Win	9–0	Cristobal Lopez	TKO	2 (?)	1999-06-07	Auditorio Fausto Gutierrez Moreno, Tijuana, Mexico	
8	Win	8–0	Indalecio Valenzuela	TKO	6 (?)	1999-04-02	Grand Hotel, Tijuana, Mexico	
7	Win	7–0	Miguel Juarez	KO	2 (?)	1998-11-20	Teatro Mutualista, Tijuana, Mexico	
6	Win	6–0	Indalecio Valenzuela	KO	1 (4)	1998-10-16	Teatro Mutualista, Tijuana, Mexico	
5	Win	5–0	Abraham Enriquez	KO	2 (4)	1998-09-16	Auditorio Municipal, Tecate, Mexico	
4	Win	4–0	Cruz Alvaro Valdez	TKO	2 (4)	1998-07-31	Auditorio Fausto Gutierrez Moreno, Tijuana, Mexico	
3	Win	3–0	Julio Cesar Amaro	TKO	2 (4)	1998-06-05	Auditorio Fausto Gutierrez Moreno, Tijuana, Mexico	
2	Win	2–0	Osvaldo Ibarra	TKO	2 (4)	1998-03-26	Tijuana, Mexico	
1	Win	1–0	Jose Luis Araiza	TKO	3 (4)	1998-02-21	San Luis Río Colorado, Mexico	

== See also ==
- List of southpaw stance boxers
- List of Mexican boxing world champions
- List of world mini-flyweight boxing champions

Sporting positions
Regional boxing titles
New title	WBC Youth mini-flyweight champion June 2, 2000 – April 29, 2001; Won world title	Vacant Title next held by Oleydong Sithsamerchai
Preceded by Víctor Burgos	NABO light-flyweight champion December 4, 2000 – April 29, 2001; Won world title	Vacant Title next held by Hugo Cázares
World boxing titles
Vacant Title last held by Zolani Petelo	IBF mini-flyweight champion April 29, 2001 – August 9, 2002	Succeeded by Miguel Barrera
