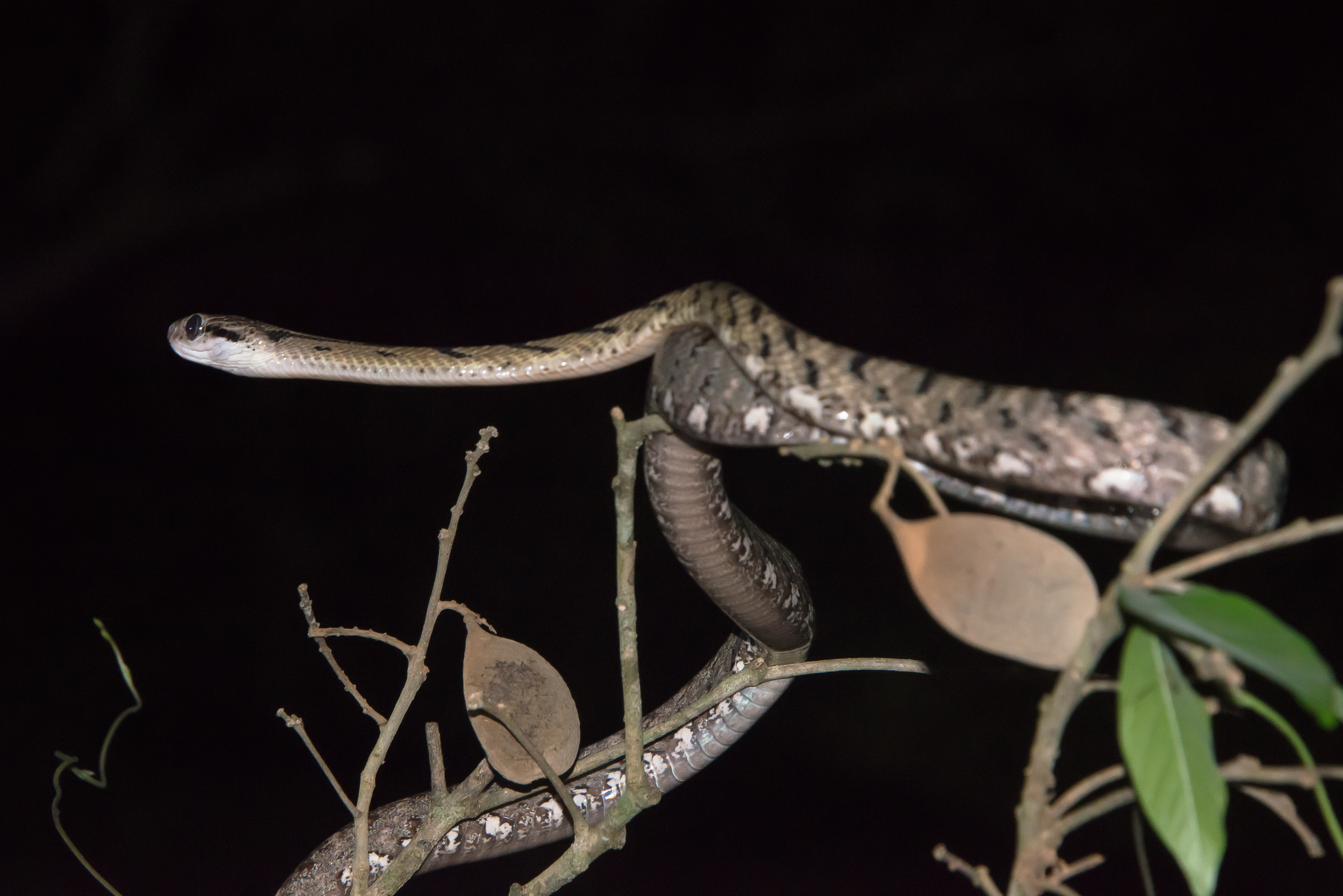

Conservation status
- Least Concern (IUCN 3.1)

Scientific classification
- Kingdom: Animalia
- Phylum: Chordata
- Class: Reptilia
- Order: Squamata
- Suborder: Serpentes
- Family: Colubridae
- Genus: Boiga
- Species: B. siamensis

Binomial name
- Boiga siamensis Nutaphand, 1971

Synonyms
- Boiga ocellata Kroon, 1973

= Boiga siamensis =

Species of snake

The gray cat snake (Boiga siamensis), also known as eyed cat snake or Siamese cat snake is a species of catsnake found in northeastern India, Bangladesh, Myanmar, Cambodia, Thailand, Malaysia, Vietnam. and Nepal

== Description ==
The Siamese cat snake resembles the dog-toothed snake but it occupies a different geographical range. It is a large snake, reaching almost 2 m (6 1/2 ft) in total length. Colours are greyish-brown with black crossbars that are most distinct interiorly. The head is dark brown with a dark streak from behind the eye to the first body crossbar that is broken just beyond the last supralabial. The chin and throat are white, the ventrals white to light brown

== Behavior and venom ==
Mostly nocturnal, it is a potentially aggressive snake. It is a rear fanged venom snake but there are not known casualties registered.

== Geographic range ==
It is found in India, Bangladesh, Myanmar, Cambodia, Thailand, Nepal, Malaysia, and Vietnam. It is also found in Laos.

== Habitat ==
These snakes are found in forest-hills and plains and can be found up to 1,700 m (5,577 ft.). They are arboreal but can be found near water too.

== Diet ==
This snake feeds on, birds, and eggs.

== Reproduction ==
Boiga siamensis is an oviparous species, with sexually mature females laying eggs, 6–12 per clutch

== Gallery ==
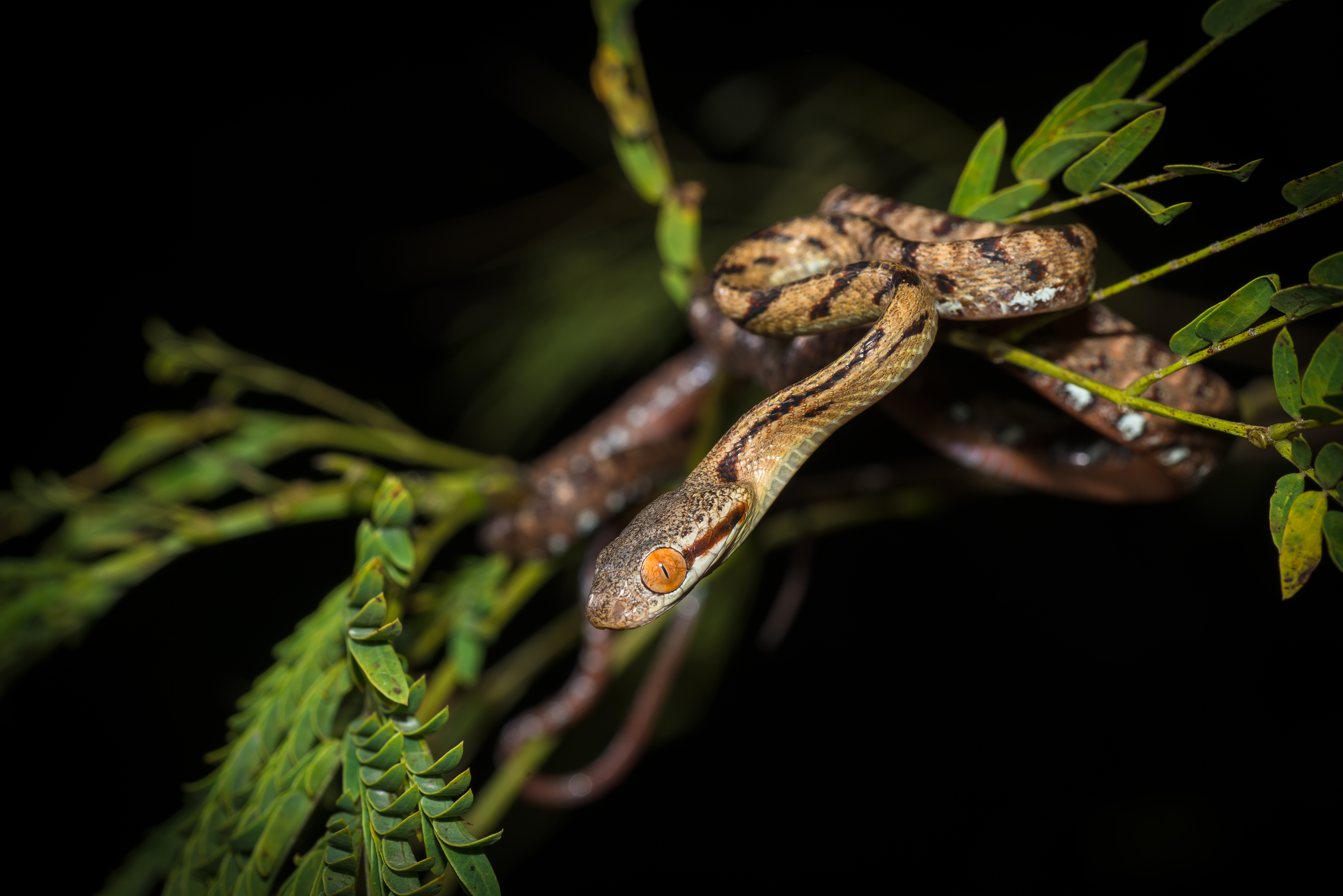
Boiga siamensis, Siamese cat snake (juvenile)

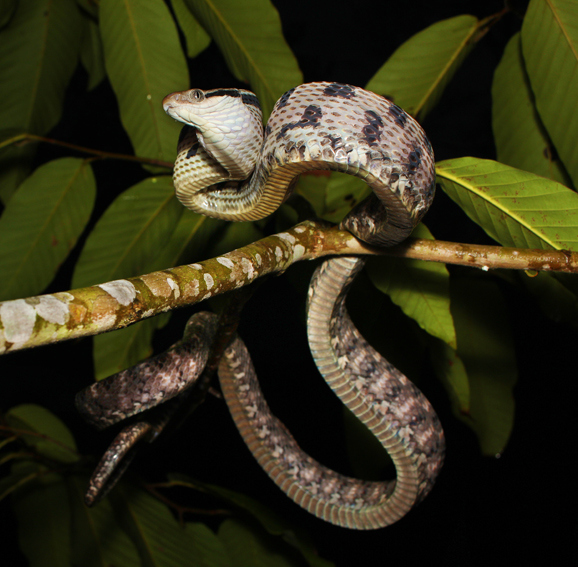
Siamese cat snake, Boiga siamensis from Kaeng Krachan National Park.

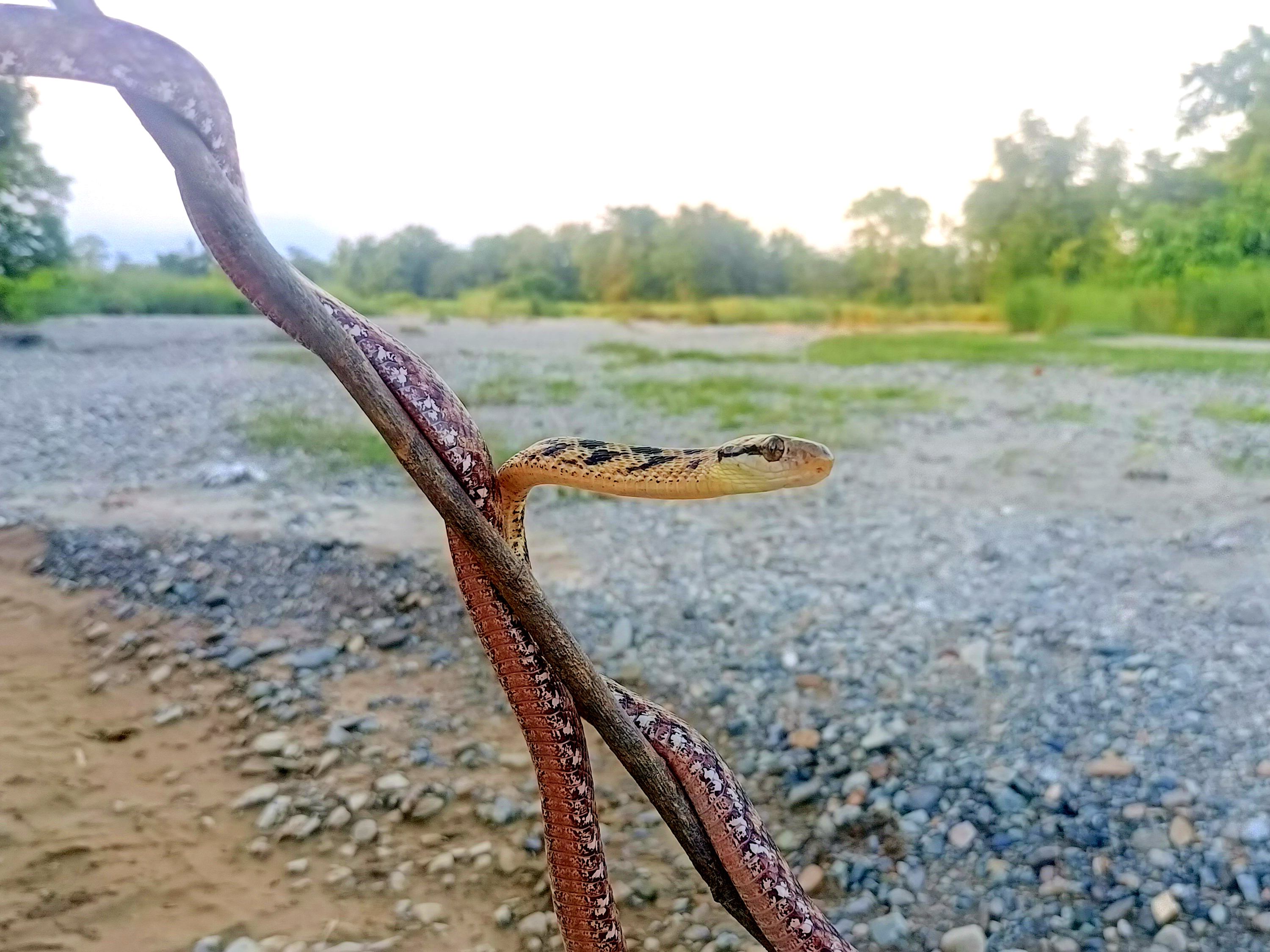
Thai cat snake from Dalgaon, Alipurduar, West Bengal.

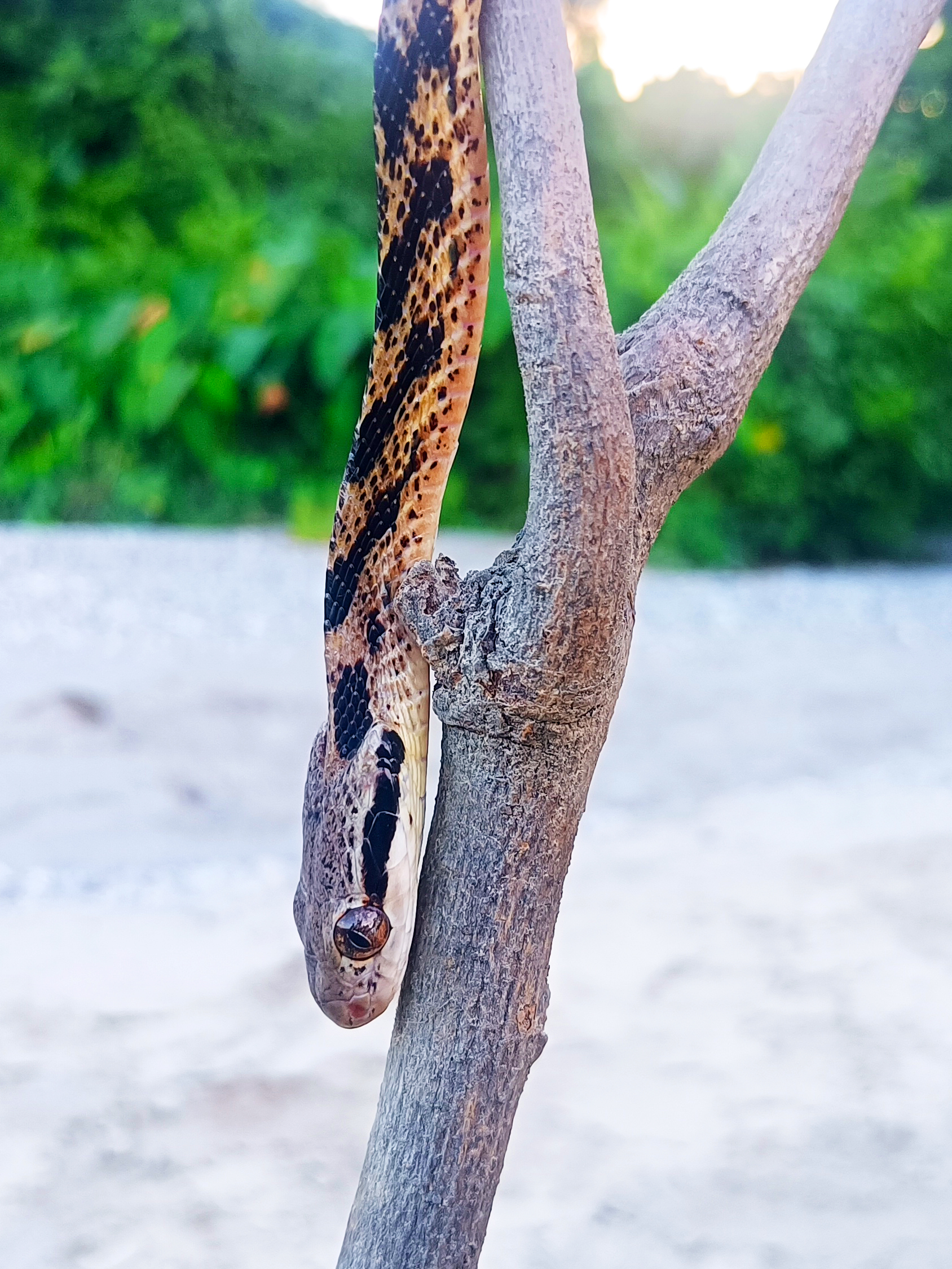
Thai cat snake from Dalgaon, Alipurduar, West Bengal.
