= Canalete =

- Municipality and town
- Flag

- Location of the municipality and town of Canalete in the Córdoba Department of Colombia.

- Location in Colombia
- Coordinates: 08°47′N 76°14′W
- Country: Colombia
- Department: Córdoba Department

Area
  - Total: 394 km^{2} (152 sq mi)
- Elevation: 25 m (82 ft)

Population (Census 2018)
  - Total: 14,831
  - Density: 37.6/km^{2} (97.5/sq mi)
- Time zone: UTC-5 (Colombia Standard Time)
- Website: www.canalete-cordoba.gov.co

Canalete is a town and municipality located in the Córdoba Department, northern Colombia. According to 2018 estimates, the population of Canalete was 14,831.
