= Alfredo Xeque =

Mexican boxer (born 1969)

Personal information
- Born: Alfredo Xeque; 12 January 1969 (age 57) Mexico
- Height: 5 ft 4 in (1.63 m)
- Weight: Light flyweight

Boxing career
- Reach: 31 in (79 cm)

Boxing record
- Total fights: 21
- Wins: 17
- Win by KO: 4
- Losses: 2
- Draws: 2
- No contests: 0

Alfredo Xeque (born 12 January 1969) is a Mexican former light flyweight boxer, based in Campeche, who competed from 1985 to 1992. His record stands at 19 wins, 7 losses and 2 draws after 28 professional bouts.
