= Chakkam Khanathon School =

- Thai: โรงเรียนจักรคำคณาทร จังหวัดลำพูน

Location
- Lamphun; Thailand
- Coordinates: 18.591915°N 99.013970°E

Information
- Established: 1904; 122 years ago
- Founder: Mr. Choy (Thai: นายช่วย มินิกานน์)
- Principal: Mr. Amnouy (Thai: นายอำนวย อุตตระพยอม)
- Grades: 7—12
- Enrollment: c. 3,000

The Chakkam Khanathon School (Thai: โรงเรียนจักรคำคณาทร จังหวัดลำพูน) is a school located in Lamphun, Thailand. Founded in 1904, the school has a student body of approximately 3,000 students, from Year 7 to Year 12.

== Overview ==
The school's history reflects the local peoples traditions in learning in Lamphun, Thailand.

The educational staff is reflected from the first founder Mr. Choy (Thai: นายช่วย มินิกานน์) to its current leader, Mr. Amnouy (Thai: นายอำนวย อุตตระพยอม). Other leaders are listed as well that have contributed to the growth of the school. The board of directors are responsible for the day-to-day affairs of Chakkham High School.

Honor students such as Teepakorn Chaitham encourages all students to be number one in their educational pursuits by completing their homework and participating in activities and the various clubs offered by the administration.
