= Carlos Buitrago =

Nicaraguan boxer

Personal information
- Nickname: Chocorroncito
- Born: Carlos Alberto Buitrago Rojas; December 16, 1991 (age 34) Managua, Nicaragua
- Height: 5 ft 3 in (160 cm)
- Weight: Mini flyweight; Light flyweight; Flyweight; Super flyweight; Super bantamweight

Boxing career
- Reach: 65 in (165 cm)
- Stance: Orthodox

Boxing record
- Total fights: 51
- Wins: 38
- Win by KO: 22
- Losses: 11
- Draws: 1
- No contests: 1

Carlos Alberto Buitrago Rojas (born December 16, 1991) is a Nicaraguan professional boxer. He has challenged four times for a world championship: the WBO mini flyweight title in 2013, the IBF mini flyweight title in 2017, and the WBO junior flyweight title in 2018 and 2020.

== Professional career ==
Buitrago challenged for his first world title against Merlito Sabillo for the WBO minimumweight title on November 30, 2013. The fight ended in a split draw, so Sabillo retained the title.

== Professional boxing record ==
53 fights	38 wins	13 losses
By knockout	22	4
By decision	16	9
Draws	1	
No contests	1	

No.	Result	Record	Opponent	Type	Round, time	Date	Location	Notes
53	Loss	38–13–1 (1)	(United States) Ricardo Rafael Sandoval	RTD	8 (10), 3:00	Mar 30, 2024	(United States) YouTube Theater, Inglewood, California, U.S.	
52	Loss	38–12–1 (1)	(Mexico) Yahir Alan Frank Verdugo	UD	10	Feb 24, 2024	Centro de Convenciones Siglo XXI, Mérida, Mexico	
51	Win	38–11–1 (1)	(Nicaragua) Nelson Luna	RTD	3 (6), 3:00	Dec 23, 2023	San José, Costa Rica	
50	Loss	37–11–1 (1)	(Dominican Republic) Noel Reyes Cepeda	SD	10	Oct 7, 2023	Restaurante Bar Don Juan, Carmen de Apicalá, Colombia	For WBA Fedecentro super bantamweight title
49	Loss	37–10–1 (1)	(Puerto Rico) Ángel Acosta	UD	10	Aug 26, 2023	Roberto Clemente Coliseum, San Juan, Puerto Rico	For vacant WBO International junior flyweight title
48	Win	37–9–1 (1)	(Nicaragua) Nelson Luna	KO	4 (8), 2:05	Jun 6, 2023	Gimnasio PWR LAB, San José, Costa Rica	
47	Loss	36–9–1 (1)	(Puerto Rico) Juan Carlos Camacho	UD	10	Apr 1, 2023	Coliseo Dolores "Toyita" Melendez, Juana Díaz, Puerto Rico	For vacant WBC–NABF super flyweight title
46	Loss	36–8–1 (1)	(Mexico) Luis Fernando Villa	UD	10	Nov 19, 2022	Arena Astros, Guadalajara, Mexico	
45	Win	36–7–1 (1)	(Puerto Rico) Jose Martinez	SD	8	Aug 19, 2022	Roberto Clemente Coliseum, San Juan, Puerto Rico	
44	Win	35–7–1 (1)	(Nicaragua) Eddy Castro	KO	3 (8), 0:46	Jun 17, 2022	BN Arena, Hatillo, Costa Rica	
43	Win	34–7–1 (1)	(Nicaragua) Luis Martinez	KO	1 (8), 1:39	May 14, 2022	BN Arena, Hatillo, Costa Rica	
42	Win	33–7–1 (1)	(Nicaragua) Luis Martinez	UD	6	Dec 18, 2021	Ciudad Deportiva Heiner Ugalde, Hatillo, Costa Rica	
41	Loss	32–7–1 (1)	(United States) Ricardo Rafael Sandoval	TKO	7 (10), 0:46	Dec 4, 2021	(United States) MGM Grand Garden Arena, Paradise, Nevada, U.S.	
40	Loss	32–6–1 (1)	(Mexico) Elwin Soto	UD	12	Oct 30, 2020	(United States) Fantasy Springs Resort Casino, Indio, California, U.S.	For WBO junior flyweight title
39	Win	32–5–1 (1)	(Nicaragua) Felix Moncada	KO	4 (10), 0:52	Dec 21, 2019	Gimnasio Fight Club, San José, Costa Rica	
38	Loss	31–5–1 (1)	(Puerto Rico) McWilliams Arroyo	UD	10	Jun 15, 2019	Coliseo Roger L. Mendoza, Caguas, Puerto Rico	For WBO Latino flyweight title
37	Win	31–4–1 (1)	(Panama) Gilmer Baules	UD	6	Feb 2, 2019	BN Arena, Hatillo, Costa Rica	
36	Loss	30–4–1 (1)	(Puerto Rico) Ángel Acosta	TKO	12 (12), 1:43	Jun 16, 2018	José Miguel Agrelot Coliseum, San Juan, Puerto Rico	For WBO junior flyweight title
35	Loss	30–3–1 (1)	(Japan) Hiroto Kyoguchi	TKO	8 (12), 2:28	Dec 31, 2017	Ota City General Gymnasium, Tokyo, Japan	For IBF mini flyweight title
34	Win	30–2–1 (1)	(Mexico) Noe Medina	UD	8	Oct 15, 2016	Puerto Salvador Allende, Managua, Nicaragua	
33	Win	29–2–1 (1)	(Nicaragua) Roger Collado	KO	1 (8), 1:56	May 28, 2016	Gimnasio Rosendo Álvarez, Managua, Nicaragua	
32	Loss	28–2–1 (1)	(Thailand) Knockout CP Freshmart	UD	12	Feb 4, 2016	City Hall Ground, Chonburi, Thailand	For WBA interim mini flyweight title
31	Win	28–1–1 (1)	(Mexico) Mario Rodriguez	UD	10	Mar 21, 2015	Palenque de la Feria Mesoamericana, Tapachula, Mexico	Won inaugural WBA–NABA mini flyweight title
30	Loss	27–1–1 (1)	(Thailand) Knockout CP Freshmart	UD	12	Oct 1, 2014	New I-Mobile Stadium, Buriram, Thailand	For vacant WBA interim mini flyweight title
29	Draw	27–0–1 (1)	(Philippines) Merlito Sabillo	SD	12	Nov 30, 2013	Smart Araneta Coliseum, Quezon City, Philippines	For WBO mini flyweight title
28	Win	27–0 (1)	(Mexico) Julian Yedras	UD	12	Jul 20, 2013	Centro Internacional de Convenciones Siglo XXI, Yucatán, Mexico	
27	Win	26–0 (1)	(Nicaragua) Jose Aguilar	UD	8	May 25, 2013	Polideportivo Espana, Managua, Nicaragua	
26	Win	25–0 (1)	(Nicaragua) Yader Escobar	TKO	1 (10), 1:24	May 3, 2013	Gimnasio Alexis Argüello, Managua, Nicaragua	
25	Win	24–0 (1)	(Nicaragua) Jose Aguilar	TD	5 (10)	Oct 6, 2012	Polideportivo Espana, Managua, Nicaragua	Unanimous TD after Buitrago cut from accidental head clash
24	Win	23–0 (1)	(Nicaragua) Eddy Castro	TKO	5 (6), 2:48	May 26, 2012	Hotel Holiday Inn, Managua, Nicaragua	
23	Win	22–0 (1)	(Colombia) Gabriel Mendoza	UD	10	Feb 17, 2012	Pharaoh's Casino, Managua, Nicaragua	Won vacant WBO Latino mini flyweight title
22	Win	21–0 (1)	(Panama) Carlos Melo	UD	10	Dec 9, 2011	Pharaoh's Casino, Managua, Nicaragua	
21	Win	20–0 (1)	(Mexico) Felipe Rivas	UD	10	Aug 12, 2011	(United States) Seminole Hard Rock Hotel and Casino, Hollywood, Florida, U.S.	
20	Win	19–0 (1)	(Nicaragua) William Trana	TKO	8 (8), 1:58	Jul 2, 2011	Gimnasio Alexis Argüello, Managua, Nicaragua	
19	Win	18–0 (1)	(Nicaragua) Eddy Castro	TKO	2 (6), 0:44	May 6, 2011	Pharaoh's Casino, Managua, Nicaragua	
18	Win	17–0 (1)	(Colombia) Jorle Estrada	TKO	6 (9), 2:25	Nov 23, 2010	Pharaoh's Casino, Managua, Nicaragua	Retained WBA Fedecentro mini flyweight title
17	NC	16–0 (1)	(Nicaragua) Eddy Castro	NC	2 (9)	Oct 30, 2010	Gimnasio Alexis Argüello, Managua, Nicaragua	WBA Fedecentro mini flyweight title at stake; NC after accidental head clash
16	Win	16–0	(Costa Rica) Eddy Zuniga	UD	9	Jun 18, 2010	Gimnasio Polideportivo Espana, Managua, Nicaragua	Retained WBO Youth mini flyweight title; Won vacant WBA Fedecentro mini flyweight title
15	Win	15–0	(Nicaragua) Hector Elizabeth	TKO	4 (8), 0:10	Apr 30, 2010	Pharaoh's Casino, Managua, Nicaragua	
14	Win	14–0	(Nicaragua) Jose Martinez	UD	8	Feb 6, 2010	Gimnasio Alexis Argüello, Managua, Nicaragua	
13	Win	13–0	(Mexico) Edgar Jimenez	TKO	7 (10), 2:12	Dec 19, 2009	Estadio Nacional, Managua, Nicaragua	Won inaugural WBO Youth mini flyweight title
12	Win	12–0	(Nicaragua) Giovany Rayo	KO	6 (6), 1:10	Aug 15, 2009	Gimnasio Alexis Argüello, Managua, Nicaragua	
11	Win	11–0	(Nicaragua) Jose Martinez	UD	6	Jun 6, 2009	Polideportivo Espana, Managua, Nicaragua	
10	Win	10–0	(Nicaragua) Jose Carvajal	KO	1 (4), 1:45	May 1, 2009	Pharaoh's Casino, Managua, Nicaragua	
9	Win	9–0	(Nicaragua) Jose Hurtado	KO	1 (6), 1:33	Feb 13, 2009	Pharaoh's Casino, Managua, Nicaragua	
8	Win	8–0	(Nicaragua) Oscar Lopez	TKO	5 (6)	Dec 13, 2008	Gimnasio Alexis Argüello, Managua, Nicaragua	
7	Win	7–0	(Nicaragua) Pedro Ramos	KO	1 (6)	Nov 28, 2008	Pharaoh's Casino, Managua, Nicaragua	
6	Win	6–0	(Nicaragua) Ernesto Castillo	TKO	1 (4), 1:20	Nov 1, 2008	Gimnasio Alexis Argüello, Managua, Nicaragua	
5	Win	5–0	(Nicaragua) Giovanny Narvaez	KO	3 (4)	Oct 4, 2008	Gimnasio Alexis Argüello, Managua, Nicaragua	
4	Win	4–0	(Nicaragua) Lester Berrios	TKO	2 (4)	Sep 12, 2008	Centro Comercial Las Américas, Managua, Nicaragua	
3	Win	3–0	(Nicaragua) Jose Carvajal	TKO	1 (4), 1:36	Aug 23, 2008	Gimnasio Alexis Argüello, Managua, Nicaragua	
2	Win	2–0	(Nicaragua) Ernesto Castillo	UD	4	Jul 12, 2008	Universidad Nacional, Managua, Nicaragua	
1	Win	1–0	(Nicaragua) Oscar Lopez	UD	4	Jun 20, 2008	Gimnasio Alexis Argüello, Managua, Nicaragua	

Sporting positions
Regional boxing titles
New title	WBO Youth mini flyweight champion December 19, 2009 – October 2010; Vacated	Title discontinued
Vacant Title last held by Omar Soto	WBA Fedecentro mini flyweight champion June 18, 2010 – March 2011; Vacated	Vacant Title next held by Jesús Silvestre
Vacant Title last held by Iván Calderón	WBO Latino mini flyweight champion February 17, 2012 – January 2013; Vacated	Title discontinued
New title	WBA–NABA mini flyweight champion March 21, 2015 – February 4, 2016; Lost bid for world title	Title discontinued
