= Shokichi Iwata =

Japanese boxer (born 1996)

Shokichi Iwata 岩田翔吉
Personal information
- Born: 2 February 1996 (age 30) Shibuya, Japan
- Height: 5 ft 5 in (165 cm)
- Weight: Light flyweight

Boxing career
- Reach: 66 in (168 cm)
- Stance: Orthodox

Boxing record
- Total fights: 18
- Wins: 16
- Win by KO: 13
- Losses: 2

Shokichi Iwata (岩田翔吉, Iwata Shokichi; born 2 February 1996) is a Japanese professional boxer. He is a two-time light-flyweight champion, having held the World Boxing Council (WBC) title since March 2026, and previously the World Boxing Organization (WBO) title from 2024 to 2025.

== Early life and amateur career ==
Iwata became interested in combat sports at the age of 9, after meeting Norifumi Yamamoto. He took up boxing in his second year of middle school. He won the U-15 national boxing tournament while in the third year of middle school.

After graduating from middle school, Iwata attended the Hiji High School. During his high school amateur career, he achieved notable victories against Takuma Inoue and Kosei Tanaka, and won the national boxing tournament while in the third year of high school. After graduating from high school, Iwata entered the Sport Sciences course at the Waseda University on a sports recommendation.

== Professional boxing career ==
=== Early career ===
Iwata made his professional debut against Joel Bermudez on 8 December 2018, at the StubHub Center in Carson, California. He won the fight by a fourth-round knockout. He made his debut in the United States, as he was only given his domestic boxing license by the JBC on 31 January 2019, which allowed him to compete in Japan.

Iwata faced the 2018 All Japan Light Flyweight "Rookie of the Year" Daiki Kameyama on 4 May 2019, at the Korakuen Hall in Tokyo, Japan. He won the fight by unanimous decision, with two judges awarding him a 59-54 scorecard, while the third judge scored it 58–56. Although he had won nearly every round of the bout, Iwata appeared dissatisfied with his performance, stating "I wanted to hit the body a little more".

Iwata was scheduled to face Paolo Sy on 12 July 2019, at the EDION Arena Osaka in Osaka, Japan, on the undercard of the WBA middleweight title fight between Rob Brant and Ryota Murata. He won the fight by a fifth-round technical knockout. Iwata suffered a cut above his right eye in the third round, due to an accidental clash of heads.

Iwata faced Alejandro Cruz Valladares on 7 November 2019, in the featured bout of the Nonito Donaire and Naoya Inoue bantamweight title bout undercard. He won the fight by a fifth-round technical knockout, stopping Valladares with a flurry of punches at the 2:10 minute mark.

Iwata was scheduled to face Ryo Narizuka on 2 October 2020. He won the fight by a seventh-round technical knockout. Iwata was next scheduled to face Toshimasa Ouchi on 5 June 2021. He won the fight by unanimous decision, with scores of 78–73, 79–72 and 78–73.

=== Regional light flyweight titlist ===
==== Japanese champion ====
Iwata was expected to face Rikito Shiba for the vacant Japanese light-flyweight title on 11 September 2021, at the Korakuen Hall in Tokyo, Japan. The fight had to be postponed the day before however, as Iwata tested positive for COVID-19 after successfully making weight. The title bout was postponed for 5 November 2021. Iwata won the first ten-round fight of his career by a ninth-round technical knockout. He knocked Shiba down in the sixth round, and appeared to once again knock him down in the eight round as well, although the second knockdown was ruled a slip by referee Tetsuya Iida. Immediately after action resumed in the ninth-round, Iwata forced Shiba back with a flurry of punches which forced the referee to wave the fight off.

Iwata was booked to make his first Japanese light-flyweight title defense in a rematch with Toshimasa Ouchi. The fight was scheduled as the headliner of the March 5, 2022, "Dynamic Glove" event, and was broadcast by G+. Iwata won the fight by a first-round knockout, flooring Ouchi with a counter right hand. Although Ouchi was able to rise from the canvas in time, he was unsteady on his feet, which prompted the referee to wave the bout off. Iwata was awarded the MVP award for the month of March by the East Japan Boxing Association, following this victory.

==== Japanese, WBO AP and OPBF champion ====
Iwata was booked to make his second Japanese title defense in a title unification bout with the OPBF light-flyweight champion Kenichi Horikawa at the Korakuen Hall on July 2, 2022. Aside from the Japanese and OPBF titles, the vacant WBO Asia Pacific title will be contested as well. Iwata won the fight by unanimous decision, with scores of 118–110, 117–111 and 116–112. He was given the July "Fighter of the Month" award by the East Japan Boxing Commission following this victory. On August 19, 2022, the Japanese Boxing Association gave him the "Skill Award" for the year 2022.

==== Iwata vs. González ====
On 3 September 2022, it was announced that Iwata would challenge the reigning WBO light flyweight champion Jonathan González. Their fight was scheduled as the co-main event of the Kenshiro Teraji and Hiroto Kyoguchi light flyweight unification bout, which took place on 1 November 2022. He lost the fight by unanimous decision, with two scorecards of 116–112 and one scorecard of 117–111.

=== Post title reign ===
Iwata faced Jerome Baloro on the undercard of "WHO'S NEXT DYNAMIC GLOVE on U-NEXT" on 1 April 2023. He won the fight by a third-round knockout. Iwata followed this up with stoppage victories over Jayson Brillo on 5 August 2023 and Rene Mark Cuarto on 20 January 2024.

== Professional boxing record ==
19 fights	17 wins	2 losses
By knockout	14	0
By decision	3	2

No.	Result	Record	Opponent	Type	Round, time	Date	Location	Notes
19	Win	17–2	Erik Badillo	TKO	11 (12), 2:13	20 July 2026	Ryōgoku Kokugikan, Tokyo, Japan	Retained WBC light-flyweight title
18	Win	16–2	Knockout CP Freshmart	TKO	8 (12), 1:33	15 Mar 2026	Yokohama Buntai, Yokohama, Japan	Won WBC light-flyweight title Originally a Unanimous TD for Iwata, later changed to a TKO
17	Win	15–2	Edwin Cano	KO	7 (10), 3:00	4 Oct 2025	Korakuen Hall, Tokyo, Japan	
16	Loss	14–2	René Santiago	UD	12	13 Mar 2025	Ryōgoku Kokugikan, Tokyo, Japan	Lost WBO light-flyweight title
15	Win	14–1	Jairo Noriega	TKO	3 (12), 3:00	13 Oct 2024	Ariake Arena, Tokyo, Japan	Won vacant WBO light-flyweight title
14	Win	13–1	Jahzeel Trinidad	TKO	6 (10), 1:10	6 Jul 2024	Korakuen Hall, Tokyo, Japan	
13	Win	12–1	Rene Mark Cuarto	TKO	6 (8), 2:21	20 Jan 2024	Korakuen Hall, Tokyo, Japan	
12	Win	11–1	Jayson Brillo	TKO	6 (10), 1:28	5 Aug 2023	Korakuen Hall, Tokyo, Japan	
11	Win	10–1	Jerome Baloro	KO	3 (10), 1:07	1 Apr 2023	Korakuen Hall, Tokyo, Japan	
10	Loss	9–1	Jonathan González	UD	12	1 Nov 2022	Saitama Super Arena, Saitama, Japan	For WBO light-flyweight title
9	Win	9–0	Kenichi Horikawa	UD	12	2 Jul 2022	Korakuen Hall, Tokyo, Japan	Retained Japanese light-flyweight title Won OPBF and vacant WBO Asia Pacific light-flyweight titles
8	Win	8–0	Toshimasa Ouchi	KO	1 (10), 1:12	5 Mar 2022	Korakuen Hall, Tokyo, Japan	Retained Japanese light-flyweight title
7	Win	7–0	Rikito Shiba	TKO	9 (10), 0:37	6 Nov 2021	Korakuen Hall, Tokyo, Japan	Won vacant Japanese light-flyweight title
6	Win	6–0	Toshimasa Ouchi	UD	8	5 Jun 2021	Korakuen Hall, Tokyo, Japan	
5	Win	5–0	Ryo Narizuka	TKO	7 (8), 0:38	2 Oct 2020	Korakuen Hall, Tokyo, Japan	
4	Win	4–0	Alejandro Cruz Valladares	TKO	5 (6), 2:10	7 Nov 2019	Saitama Super Arena, Saitama, Japan	
3	Win	3–0	Paolo Sy	TKO	5 (6), 1:25	12 Jul 2019	EDION Arena Osaka, Osaka, Japan	
2	Win	2–0	Daiki Kameyama	UD	6	4 May 2019	Korakuen Hall, Tokyo, Japan	
1	Win	1–0	Joel Bermudez	KO	4 (4), 2:44	8 Dec 2018	StubHub Center, Carson, California, U.S.	

== See also ==
- List of male boxers
- Boxing in Japan
- List of Japanese boxing world champions
- List of world light-flyweight boxing champions

Sporting positions
Regional boxing titles
Vacant Title last held by Masamichi Yabuki	Japanese light-flyweight champion 6 November 2021 – 2022; Vacated	Vacant Title next held by Toshimasa Ouchi
Preceded by Kenichi Horikawa	OPBF light-flyweight champion 2 July 2022 – 2022; Vacated	Vacant Title next held by Joey Canoy
Vacant Title last held by Riku Kano	WBO Asia Pacific light-flyweight champion 2 July 2022 – 2022; Vacated	Vacant Title next held by Ryuya Yamanaka
World boxing titles
Vacant Title last held by Jonathan González	WBO light-flyweight champion 13 October 2024 – 13 March 2025	Succeeded by René Santiago
Preceded by Knockout CP Freshmart	WBC light-flyweight champion 15 March 2026 – pressnt	Incumbent
