= Ricardo Sandoval =

American boxer (born 1999)

Personal information
- Nickname: El Niño ("The Kid")
- Born: Ricardo Rafael Sandoval; February 5, 1999 (age 27) Montclair, California, U.S.
- Height: 5 ft 6 in (168 cm)
- Weight: Flyweight

Boxing career
- Reach: 67 in (170 cm)
- Stance: Orthodox

Boxing record
- Total fights: 30
- Wins: 27
- Win by KO: 18
- Losses: 3

Ricardo Rafael Sandoval (born February 5, 1999) is an American professional boxer. He was the unified World Boxing Council (WBC) and World Boxing Association (WBA) flyweight champion from July 2025 until October 2026.

== Professional boxing career ==
Sandoval made his professional debut against Adalberto Solares on 18 June 2016, and won the fight by a third-round technical knockout. He amassed a 16–0 record during the next three years, with eleven of those fights coming by way of stoppage. Following his step-up fight against Marco Sustaita, Sandoval was scheduled to face Gilbert Gonzalez on 16 November 2019. He won the fight by a fifth-round technical knockout.

Sandoval's sole fight of 2020 came against Raymond Tabugon on 6 February 2020. He won the fight by a seventh-round knockout, stopping Tabugon at the 1:43 minute mark of the round.

Sandoval was scheduled to face one-time WBC flyweight title challenger Jay Harris in an IBF flyweight title eliminator, in the main event of a DAZN card, on 25 June 2021. Despite coming into the fight as a slight underdog, Sandoval nonetheless won the fight by an eight-round knockout. The fight was stopped at the 2:21 minute mark of the round, after Harris was dropped to the canvas twice and was unable to beat the eight count following the second knockdown. Sandoval was scheduled to fight Carlos Buitrago in a stay-busy fight on 4 December 2021. He won the fight by a seventh-round technical knockout.

Sandoval faced David Jiménez in a WBA flyweight title eliminator on 16 July 2022, on the undercard of the Ryan Garcia and Javier Fortuna lightweight bout. Sandoval was knocked down in the eleventh round, which proved to be the pivotal moment of the bout, as he lost the fight by majority decision: Two judges scored the fight 114–112 for Jiménez, while the third judge scored it 113–113. Most ringside observers thought Sandoval won the fight, as well as the odds-makers, who had Sandoval as a +900 favorite to win by the end of the contest.

Sandoval faced Jerson Ortiz on 18 February 2023. He won the fight by a second-round knockout. Sandoval dropped his opponent with a punch to the body in the dying seconds of the round, which left Ortiz unable to rise from the canvas.

On 10 June 2023, Sandoval faced Rocco Santomauro at the Toyota Arena in Ontario, California. He won the fight by unanimous decision with the judges awarding Sandoval scores of 98–92, 96–94, and 96–94.

Sandoval faced Victor Efrain Sandoval on 21 October 2023. He won the fight by unanimous decision.

Sandoval was scheduled to have a rematch with Carlos Buitrago in a super flyweight bout on 30 March 2024. He stopped Buitrago after eight rounds. The referee stopped the fight between the eighth and the ninth due to the ringside doctor's observation of the accumulated damage on Buitrago's face.

On 6 July 2024, Sandoval faced Ángel Acosta for the vacant WBC Silver flyweight title. The referee controversially stopped the fight in the 10th and final round, handing Sandoval the victory. "I wasn’t hurt," Acosta said after getting backed to the ropes by Sandoval's pressure. Regardless of the stoppage, the scorecards had Sandoval winning by a wide margin, 88–83, 89–82, and 87–84.

Sandoval was scheduled to defend his WBC Silver flyweight title against Saleto Henderson on 15 February 2025. He won the bout by unanimous decision, with scores of 98–92, 100–90, and 100–90. According to CompuBox, Sandoval outlanded Henderson in total punches, 185 to 78.

=== Sandoval vs. Teraji ===
Sandoval was scheduled to challenge Kenshiro Teraji for the unified WBA and WBC flyweight championship on 30 July 2025. He overcame a fifth round knockdown to win via split decision. One judge scored the bout 114–113 in favor of Teraji while the other two scored it for Sandoval, 115–112 and 117–110.

=== Sandoval vs. Yafai ===
Sandoval was scheduled to make the first defense of his unified WBA and WBC flyweight titles against Galal Yafai at Utilita Arena in Sheffield, England, on 6 June 2026. However, his opponent withdrew after sustaining an injury in training.

=== Sandoval vs. Mendoza ===
On 10 October 2026, Sandoval finally defended his titles for the first time against Sergio Mendoza at Wintrust Arena in Chicago. He was sent to the canvas twice in the second round and, after being floored again in the fifth, the referee stepped in to stop the contest and award his opponent the win by technical knockout.

== Professional boxing record ==
30 fights	27 wins	3 losses
By knockout	18	1
By decision	9	2

No.	Result	Record	Opponent	Type	Round, time	Date	Location	Notes
30	Loss	27–3	Sergio Mendoza	TKO	5 (12), 1:46	10 Oct 2026	Wintrust Arena, Chicago, Illinois, U.S.	Lost WBA and WBC flyweight titles
29	Win	27–2	Kenshiro Teraji	SD	12	30 Jul 2025	Yokohama Buntai, Yokohama, Japan	Won WBA and WBC flyweight titles
28	Win	26–2	Saleto Henderson	UD	10	15 Feb 2025	Honda Center, Anaheim, California, U.S.	Retained WBC Silver flyweight title
27	Win	25–2	Ángel Acosta	KO	10 (10), 1:23	6 Jul 2024	Toyota Arena, Ontario, California, U.S.	Won vacant WBC Silver flyweight title
26	Win	24–2	Carlos Buitrago	RTD	8 (10), 3:00	30 Mar 2024	YouTube Theater, Inglewood, California, U.S.	
25	Win	23–2	Victor Efrain Sandoval	UD	10	21 Oct 2023	Kia Forum, Inglewood, California, U.S.	
24	Win	22–2	Rocco Santomauro	UD	10	10 Jun 2023	Toyota Arena, Ontario, California, U.S.	
23	Win	21–2	Jerson Ortiz	KO	2 (10), 2:46	18 Feb 2023	Pomona Fox Theater, Pomona, California, U.S.	
22	Loss	20–2	David Jiménez	MD	12	16 Jul 2022	Crypto.com Arena, Los Angeles, California, U.S.	
21	Win	20–1	Carlos Buitrago	TKO	7 (10), 0:46	4 Dec 2021	MGM Grand Garden Arena, Paradise, Nevada, U.S.	
20	Win	19–1	Jay Harris	KO	8 (12), 2:12	25 Jun 2021	Bolton Whites Hotel, Bolton, England	
19	Win	18–1	Raymond Tabugon	KO	7 (10), 1:43	6 Feb 2020	Fantasy Springs Casino, Indio, California, U.S.	
18	Win	17–1	Gilbert Gonzalez	TKO	5 (10), 2:25	16 Nov 2019	Plaza De Toros, San Miguel de Allende, Mexico	
17	Win	16–1	Marco Sustaita	KO	5 (10), 1:16	18 Jul 2019	Fantasy Springs Casino, Indio, California, U.S.	Retained WBC Youth Intercontinental flyweight title
16	Win	15–1	Christian Aranda Orenday	TKO	6 (10), 2:07	18 Jul 2019	Bufalo Wild Wings, Culiacan, Mexico	Won vacant WBC Youth Intercontinental flyweight title
15	Win	14–1	Abisai Palomo Ochoa	TKO	4 (6), 1:51	24 Nov 2018	Oasis Hotel Complex, Cancun, Mexico	
14	Win	13–1	Oscar Vasquez	UD	8	4 May 2018	Reno-Sparks Convention Center, Reno, Nevada, U.S.	
13	Win	12–1	Victor Hugo Reyes	UD	8	17 Mar 2018	Gimnasio Burocratas, Tijuana, Mexico	
12	Win	11–1	Irving Fierro Verdugo	RTD	2 (8), 3:00	9 Feb 2018	Gimnasio Independencia, Tijuana, Mexico	
11	Win	10–1	Efrain Gonzalez	UD	4	8 Dec 2017	Gimnasio Independencia, Tijuana, Mexico	
10	Win	9–1	Brent Venegas	SD	6	17 Nov 2017	Reno-Sparks Convention Center, Reno, Nevada, U.S.	
9	Win	8–1	Pedro Antonio Rodriguez	UD	6	4 Aug 2017	Fantasy Springs Casino, Indio, California, U.S.	
8	Win	7–1	Oskar Jesus Talla Davalos	KO	1 (4), 2:44	4 Aug 2017	Escape Bar, Tijuana, Mexico	
7	Win	6–1	Benjamin Solares	KO	1 (4), 1:52	27 Jan 2017	AS Boxing Arena, Tijuana, Mexico	
6	Win	5–1	Hector Garcia	KO	1 (4), 1:13	14 Jan 2017	Gimnasio Municipal Gustavo Díaz Ordaz, Tecate, Mexico	
5	Loss	4–1	Alonso Ceja	MD	4	4 Nov 2016	AS Boxing Arena, Tijuana, Mexico	
4	Win	4–0	Alonso Ronquillo Nunez	TKO	3 (4), 2:33	15 Oct 2016	Gimnasio Mariano Matamoros, Tijuana, Mexico	
3	Win	3–0	Ulises Gabriel Rosales	TKO	3 (4), 1:34	15 Sep 2016	AS Boxing Arena, Tijuana, Mexico	
2	Win	2–0	Hector Garcia	KO	1 (4), 1:05	19 Aug 2016	Gimnasio Mariano Matamoros, Tijuana, Mexico	
1	Win	1–0	Adalberto Solares	TKO	3 (4), 1:00	18 Jun 2016	Plaza Fundadores, Los Algodones, Mexico	

== See also ==
- List of male boxers
- List of Mexican boxing world champions
- List of world flyweight boxing champions

Sporting positions
Regional boxing titles
Vacant Title last held by Cris Paulino	WBC Youth Intercontinental flyweight champion April 13, 2019 – 2021; Vacated	Vacant Title next held by Jeanfran Medina
Vacant Title last held by Josue Jesus Morales	WBC Silver flyweight champion July 6, 2024 – 2024; Vacated	Vacant Title next held by Yankiel Rivera
World boxing titles
Preceded by Kenshiro Teraji	WBA flyweight champion July 30, 2025 – October 10, 2026	Succeeded by Sergio Mendoza
Preceded by Kenshiro Teraji	WBC flyweight champion July 30, 2025 – October 10, 2026	Succeeded by Sergio Mendoza
