= Boxing at the 2019 Pan American Games – Men's 52 kg =

Men's Flyweight at the 2019 Pan American Games
- Venue: Miguel Grau Coliseum
- Dates: July 28– August 1, 2019
- Competitors: 8 from 8 nations

Medalists
Gold medal	Rodrigo Marte	Dominican Republic
Silver medal	Yosvany Veitía	Cuba
Bronze medal	Yankiel Rivera	Puerto Rico
Bronze medal	Ramón Quiroga	Argentina

The Men's flyweight competition of the boxing events at the 2019 Pan American Games in Lima, Peru, was held between the 28 of July and the 1 of August 2019 at the Miguel Grau Coliseum.

Like all Pan American boxing events, the competition is a straight single-elimination tournament. Both semifinal losers are awarded bronze medals, so no boxers compete again after their first loss. Bouts consist of a 3 rounds "10-point must" scoring system used in the pro game, where the winner of each round must be awarded 10 points and the loser a lesser amount, and the elimination of the padded headgear. Five judges scored each bout. The winner will be the boxer who scored the most at the end of the match.

== Results ==
=== Bracket ===
Quarterfinals; July 28, 2019
Yosvany Veitía (CUB)	5
Yilmar Landázury (COL)	0
Rogger Rivera (PER)	0
Yankiel Rivera (PUR)	5
Ramón Quiroga (ARG)	5
Miguel Capilla (MEX)	0
Rodrigo Marte (DOM)	5
Héctor Tapia (CHI)	0

Semifinals; July 30, 2019
Yosvany Veitía (CUB)	5
Yankiel Rivera (PUR)	0
Ramón Quiroga (ARG)	0
Rodrigo Marte (DOM)	5

Final; August 1, 2019
Yosvany Veitía (CUB)	1
Rodrigo Marte (DOM)	4
