= Kenichi Horikawa =

Japanese boxer (born 1980)

Personal information
- Native name: 堀川謙一
- Born: March 10, 1980 (age 46) Nagaokakyō, Kyoto Prefecture, Japan
- Height: 1.62 m (5 ft 4 in)
- Weight: Mini flyweight; Light flyweight; Flyweight

Boxing career
- Stance: Orthodox

Boxing record
- Total fights: 62
- Wins: 41
- Win by KO: 14
- Losses: 20
- Draws: 1

Kenichi Horikawa (堀川謙一, Horikawa Kenichi; born 10 March 1980) is a former Japanese professional boxer (born 10 March 1980) who held the OPBF light flyweight title from 2020 to 2022. His career spanned from 2000 to 2024, finishing with 62 bouts, cementing his status as a prominent veteran and gatekeeper in Japanese boxing's lower weight classes.

== Professional career ==
=== Mini flyweight ===
==== Early career ====
Horikawa made his debut on 7 April 2000 against Minoru Okada at the Prefectural Gymnasium in Osaka, Japan. Horikawa won via second-round knockout. Horikawa would have a shaky start to his career, composing a record of 3–4 with 1 knockout in his first seven bouts.

==== Horikawa vs. Yaegashi ====
By 21 June 2009, Horikawa would make a name for himself, earning victories over respectable oppositions, all of which are against compatriots in the mini flyweight division. He would come out with a record of 17–6–1 with 4 knockouts in his bout against subsequent multiple-time world titlist Akira Yaegashi for the vacant Japanese Boxing Commission (JBC) mini flyweight title in Osaka. Prior to this bout, Horikawa recently faced a previous loss against Masatate Tsuji who ended his ten-fight unbeaten streak. Horikawa would fall short via unanimous decision with the scores 94–97, 95–97 and 95–96.

==== Horikawa vs. Landero ====
On 9 May 2010, Horikawa faced Filipino Michael Landero for the vacant OPBF mini flyweight title on 9 May 2010, prior to the bout, Horikawa was ranked #3, while Landero was ranked #1 in the OPBF rankings, this bout marks both of their first matches that are not against their compatriots. In the sixth-round, Landero had Horikawa groggy and by the ninth-round, Horikawa was battered until the referee called for a halt of the contest, marking Horikawa's first knockout loss.

=== Light flyweight ===
==== Horikawa vs. Condes ====
On 27 November 2010, Horikawa fought outside of Japan for the first time in his career, challenging the former IBF world mini flyweight champion Florante Condes in Cebu City, Philippines. Horikawa suffered a seventh-round TKO loss.

=== Flyweight ===
==== Horikawa vs. Sosa ====
On 2 April 2011, Horikawa challenged former long-time WBC world light flyweight champion and reigning WBC International flyweight champion Édgar Sosa for the latter's title at Arena México in Mexico City, Mexico. Before the bout, after arriving in Mexico on 29 March, Horikawa promised to defeat the heavy favourite Sosa to make his Japanese supporters proud. Sosa dominated the bout, with the judges all announced (WBC regulations) scoring 40–36 in the first 4 rounds and continued to batter Horikawa, in the sixth-round en route to Horikawa suffering a cut on the left eyebrow caused by a punch en route to an eighth-round stoppage.

=== Return to light flyweight ===
==== Horikawa vs. Hisada I ====
On 11 November 2011 in Osaka, Horikawa would make his return to the light flyweight division facing his future rival Tetsuya Hisada in an eight-rounder bout. Horikawa would prevail via unanimous decision with the scores of 78–74, 78–75 and 77–76.

=== Return to mini flyweight ===
==== Horikawa vs. Hara ====
On 2 October 2012, Horikawa was scheduled to face the rising undefeated prospect and future IBF world mini flyweight title-challenger Ryuji Hara for the vacant JBC mini flyweight title in a ten-rounder bout at the legendary Korakuen Hall in Tokyo. Horikawa would prove to be a difficult and stiff test to the prospect who was by then foreign to ten round-bouts but eventually falter via narrow unanimous decision.

=== Return to flyweight ===
==== Horikawa vs. CP Freshmart ====
On 13 February 2013, Horikawa went to Wang Noi district, Ayutthaya, Thailand to challenge 40–4 Thai Noknoi CP Freshmart/Sitthiprasert (real name Narast Aienleng) for the vacant WBC International Silver flyweight title. Horikawa lost via UD.

=== Second return to light flyweight ===
==== Horikawa vs. Hisada II ====
On 1 July 2013, Horikawa return to the light flyweight division and challenged Tetsuya Hisada in a rematch in Tokyo, Japan. Horikawa prevailed via sex-rounds unanimous decision, retaining his superiority over the rivalry.

==== Horikawa vs. Kimura ====
On 1 February 2014, Horikawa challenged subsequent WBC world light flyweight champion Yu Kimura for the vacant JBC light flyweight championship in Tokyo, this is also Horikawa'd third bid for a Japanese (JBC) title. Horikawa would put up a respectable and credible effort, however would fail again to be crowned champion of Japan via close split decision.

On 5 September 2014, Horikawa fought his second bout in Mexico, facing mysterious debutant Hayton Hernández in an eighth-rounder bout in Mexico City, Horikawa won via majority decision.

==== Horikawa vs. Ono ====
In June 2015, it was announced that Horikawa was scheduled to fight against recent OPBF light flyweight champion and IBF world mini flyweight title-challenger Shin Ono for the vacant JBC light flyweight title on 17 September 2015 in Tokyo. Horikawa gallantly prevailed via seventh-round TKO, giving Ono his first knockout loss in half a decade. Horikawa was therefore finally crowned Japanese champion of the light flyweight division in his fourth attempt at a JBC championship and his very first recognized professional title after 15 strenuous years of his professional boxing career.

==== Horikawa vs. Teraji ====
On 27 December 2015, Horikawa made his first defence of the Japanese (JBC) national light flyweight title against reigning WBC Youth champion and subsequent decorated boxer Kenshiro Teraji in a bout heralded as the "Kyoto Rivalry Showdown" at the Ōyamazakicho Gymnasium, in Ōyamazaki. Horikawa falls short in his first title defence via hard-fought unanimous decision, ending his brief title-reign.

==== Horikawa vs. Itagaki I ====
On 12 February 2017, Horikawa faced experienced compatriot Koji Itagaki for the vacant WBO Asia Pacific light flyweight title in Hiroshima. Horikawa won via unanimous decision, earning the scores of 116–112 twice and 117–111, regaining his contender status prior to his loss to Teraji.

==== Horikawa vs. Hisada III ====
On 27 April 2017, Horikawa picked up his rivalry against Tetsuya Hisada and brought up their trilogy bout at the EDION Arena Osaka, Osaka, for the vacant Japanese light flyweight title, prior to this bout, Horikawa presumably relinquished his WBO Asia Pacific regional belt. The bout would reach the distance, in which, Hisada finally got his prized victory, being crowned the new JBC light flyweight champion and having the last laugh in his 2–1 trilogy rivalry against Horikawa.

==== Horikawa vs. Itagaki II ====
After winning his next five bouts, four via knockout, he rematched Koji Itagaki on 12 October 2018 at the Korakuen Hall in Tokyo for the Japanese (JBC) light flyweight title eliminator. In the fight, Horikawa fought offensively, pressing the action hard early in to the bout, making Itagaki fight on the back foot, although Itagaki was able to get counter shots, to his effort, Horikawa remained the aggressor and pressured the latter, eventually, Horikawa hurt Itagaki in the fourth round and pressed forward in the seventh round en route to forcing the referee to call a halt to the contest.

==== Horikawa vs. Todaka ====
After winning the Japanese light flyweight title eliminator, Horikawa was certainly more likely to have his quadrilogy with Tetsuya Hisada in JBC light flyweight showdown, however, Hisada seemingly relinquished his title in pursuit of a world-title bid, Horikawa was instead faced against Satoru Todaka for the vacant title on 14 February 2019 in Tokyo. He regained the title after victoriously defeating Todaka via eighth-round RTD, prior to the stool retirement, the bout was scored as follows: 79–73 twice and 78–75.

==== Horikawa vs. Tada ====
On 19 May 2019, Horikawa was scheduled to defend his Japanese (JBC) light flyweight crown against Masashi Tada in Kobe. In the fight, Horikawa was once again the aggressor, pressuring his opponent, although he received a cut in the third round above his left eye, Horikawa continued to pressure Tada and cut the ring successfully. In the end, Horikawa came out victorious, defeating Tada via unanimous decision, successfully defending his national crown.

==== Horikawa vs. Takahashi ====
On 10 October 2019, Horikawa made his second title-defence of the JBC light flyweight belt against youngster and underdog Yuto Takahashi in Tokyo. Horikawa loss via a narrow upset majority decision, getting outpointed and overworked by Takahashi, losing his Japanese national crown for the second time.

==== Horikawa vs. Tomita ====
Despite losing the Japanese national crown, Horikawa was scheduled to fight prospect and reigning WBO Asia Pacific champion Daiki Tomita on 25 July 2025 in Kobe for the vacant OPBF light flyweight championship. The bout was, for both, their first match during the COVID-19 pandemic and after it had cooled down by a bit, the broadcaster Shinsei Gym also decided to air the bout and event for free on YouTube. Prior to the bout, due to their previous encounters over varying oppositions, Tomita was declared the favourite and the forty-years old veteran Horikawa was the 7-2 underdog. On paper, this was supposed to be either a close bout or a class-work by Tomita, however, Horikawa would prove different, overworking the younger foe and outpointing him, proving to be smarter, Horikawa made a one-sided beating en route to the tenth round where Horikawa made a completely dominating round, pinning Tomita in the ropes and eventually stopping him more than half-way through the round, making Horikawa the new OPBF champion.

==== Horikawa vs. Iwata ====
After nearly two years of hiatus, Horikawa faced future WBO world light flyweight champion Shokichi Iwata in a triple-championship unification, where Horikawa would defend his OPBF crown, whereas Iwata would defend his Japanese national crown and also the vacant WBO Asia Pacific crown at stakes for the heralded "Asian triple crown" bout of Japan's light flyweight division. The bout went on full twelve rounds with no knockdown where Iwata would overcome the veteran Horikawa and beat him via unanimous decision, with the scores of 118–110, 117–111 and 116–112, after the bout, Iwata respectfully said "I learned a lot from Mr. Horikawa on various aspects of boxing because of his long career."

==== Horikawa vs. Canoy ====
After Iwata was scheduled to fight for the WBO world light flyweight championship against Jonathan González, the OPBF championship turned vacant. Horikawa was then scheduled to face three-time IBO world title-challenger Filipino Joey Canoy for the vacant OPBF light flyweight strap on 4 December 2022 in Osaka. The two had a slugfest with Canoy gaining the upper hand over the 42-years old Horikawa, in the seventh-round, Canoy landed a left uppercut that knocked Horikawa out, immediately prompting the referee to halt the contest and bringing up medical practitioners into the ring, this would notably mark Horikawa's first knockout defeat in over a decade.

==== Horikawa vs. Taniguchi ====
On 5 August 2023, Horikawa faced the former WBO world mini flyweight champion Masataka Taniguchi who was fresh coming off a loss in his WBO world championship defence against Melvin Jerusalem, this is also Taniguchi's light flyweight debut. Taniguchi prevailed narrowly, overcoming the 43-years old Horikawa via majority decision. In the post-fight interview, Taniguchi revealed that he suffered a broken jaw injury.

==== Horikawa vs. Takami ====
On 2 March 2024, Horikawa faced future WBA world light flyweight champion Kyosuke Takami in a ten-rounder bout in his what seems to be a "last-dance" fight at the iconic Korakuen Hall in Tokyo. Horikawa would unfortunately fall short in his last bout via sixth-round TKO.

=== Retirement ===
Following his 62nd bout, a defeat against Takami, Horikawa announced his retirement from professional boxing. Although he had announced his retirement on previous occasions before returning to the sport, the Japanese Boxing Commission (JBC) received his retirement notice on 31 March 2024, and Horikawa officially retired in April 2024. He finished his professional career with a record of 41 wins in 62 bouts.

== Professional boxing record ==
62 fights	41 wins	20 losses
By knockout	14	5
By decision	27	15
Draws	1	

No.	Result	Record	Opponent	Type	Round, time	Date	Location	Notes
62	Loss	41–20–1	Kyosuke Takami	TKO	6 (10), 2:50	2 Mar 2024	Korakuen Hall, Tokyo, Japan	
61	Loss	41–19–1	Masataka Taniguchi	MD	10	5 Aug 2023	Korakuen Hall, Tokyo, Japan	
60	Loss	41–18–1	Joey Canoy	TKO	7 (12), 1:01	4 Dec 2022	EDION Arena, Osaka, Japan	For vacant OPBF light flyweight title
59	Loss	41–17–1	Shokichi Iwata	UD	12	2 Jul 2022	Korakuen Hall, Tokyo, Japan	Lost OPBF light flyweight title; For Japanese and vacant WBO Asia Pacific light flyweight titles
58	Win	41–16–1	Daiki Tomita	TKO	10 (12), 1:47	25 Jul 2020	Central Gym, Kobe, Japan	Won vacant OPBF light flyweight title
57	Loss	40–16–1	Yuto Takahashi	MD	10	10 Oct 2019	Korakuen Hall, Tokyo, Japan	Lost Japanese light flyweight titles
56	Win	40–15–1	Masashi Tada	UD	10	19 May 2019	Portopia Hotel, Kobe, Japan	Retained Japanese light flyweight title
55	Win	39–15–1	Satoru Todaka	RTD	8 (10), 3:00	14 Feb 2019	Korakuen Hall, Tokyo, Japan	Won vacant Japanese light flyweight title
54	Win	38–15–1	Koji Itagaki	TKO	7 (8), 2:14	12 Oct 2018	Korakuen Hall, Tokyo, Japan	
53	Win	37–15–1	Naoto Takanashi	TKO	5 (8), 1:03	12 Jul 2018	Korakuen Hall, Tokyo, Japan	
52	Win	36–15–1	Petchaboon Sithsaithong	TKO	7 (8), 1:55	26 May 2018	EDION Arena, Osaka, Japan	
51	Win	35–15–1	Natchaphon Wichaita	KO	2 (8), 2:12	13 Mar 2018	Portopia Hotel, Kobe, Japan	
50	Win	34–15–1	Yutthaphan Klinchan	KO	1 (8), 3:06	14 Dec 2017	Korakuen Hall, Tokyo, Japan	
49	Win	33–15–1	Takayuki Teraji	UD	8	15 Aug 2017	Shimazu Arena, Kyoto, Japan	
48	Loss	32–15–1	Tetsuya Hisada	UD	10	21 Apr 2017	EDION Arena, Osaka, Japan	For vacant Japanese light flyweight title
47	Win	32–14–1	Koji Itagaki	UD	12	12 Feb 2017	NTT Cred Hall, Hiroshima, Japan	Won vacant WBO Asia Pacific light flyweight title
46	Win	31–14–1	Akiyoshi Kanazawa	SD	8	7 Aug 2016	L-Theatre, Osaka, Japan	
45	Loss	30–14–1	Kenshiro Teraji	UD	10	27 Dec 2015	Ōyamazakicho Gymnasium, Ōyamazaki, Japan	Lost Japanese light flyweight title
44	Win	30–13–1	Shin Ono	TKO	7 (10), 1:33	17 Sep 2015	Korakuen Hall, Tokyo, Japan	Won vacant Japanese light flyweight title
43	Win	29–13–1	Il Che	TKO	8 (8), 2:24	20 Jul 2015	Namihaya Dome, Kadoma, Japan	
42	Win	28–13–1	Munehito Kijima	TKO	4 (8), 2:55	12 Apr 2015	Art Center, Kobe, Japan	
41	Win	27–13–1	Hayton Hernández	MD	8	4 Sep 2014	Salón Fascinación, Mexico City, Mexico	
40	Win	26–13–1	Naoki Matsumoto	MD	8	6 Jul 2014	IMP Hall, Osaka, Japan	
39	Loss	25–13–1	Yu Kimura	SD	10	1 Feb 2014	Korakuen Hall, Tokyo, Japan	For vacant Japanese light flyweight title
38	Win	25–12–1	Toshimasa Ouchi	MD	8	19 Oct 2013	Korakuen Hall, Tokyo, Japan	
37	Win	24–12–1	Tetsuya Hisada	UD	6	1 Jul 2013	Korakuen Hall, Tokyo, Japan	
36	Loss	23–12–1	Noknoi Sitthiprasert	UD	12	13 Feb 2013	Pratunampra-in, Ayutthaya, Thailand	For vacant WBC International Silver flyweight title
35	Loss	23–11–1	Ryuji Hara	UD	10	2 Oct 2012	Korakuen Hall, Tokyo, Japan	For vacant Japanese mini flyweight title
34	Win	23–10–1	Yusuke Sakashita	UD	8	10 Jun 2012	Sumiyoshi Ward Center, Osaka, Japan	
33	Win	22–10–1	Tetsuya Hisada	UD	8	11 Nov 2011	Prefectural Gymnasium, Osaka, Japan	
32	Win	21–10–1	Sho Nakazawa	UD	8	7 Aug 2011	IMP Hall, Osaka, Japan	
31	Loss	20–10–1	Édgar Sosa	TKO	8 (12), 2:24	2 Apr 2011	Arena México, Mexico City, Mexico	For WBC International flyweight title
30	Loss	20–9–1	Florante Condes	TKO	7 (10), 2:40	27 Nov 2010	Cebu City Waterfront Hotel and Casino, Cebu City, Philippines	
29	Win	20–8–1	Yuma Iwahashi	UD	8	21 Oct 2010	Bunka Hall, Kobe, Japan	
28	Loss	19–8–1	Michael Landero	TKO	9 (12), 1:50	9 May 2010	IMP Hall, Osaka, Japan	For vacant OPBF mini flyweight title
27	Win	19–7–1	Yasushi Matsushita	US	6	7 Feb 2010	World Memorial Hall, Kobe, Japan	
26	Win	18–7–1	Yasuhiro Hisada	UD	8	4 Oct 2009	IMP Hall, Osaka, Japan	
25	Loss	17–7–1	Akira Yaegashi	UD	10	21 Jun 2009	IMP Hall, Osaka, Japan	For vacant Japanese mini flyweight title
24	Loss	17–6–1	Masatate Tsuji	SD	8	8 Oct 2008	Korakuen Hall, Tokyo, Japan	
23	Win	17–5–1	Hiroshi Matsumoto	SD	6	3 Jul 2008	Korakuen Hall, Tokyo, Japan	
22	Win	16–5–1	Il Che	UD	8	20 Apr 2008	IMP Hall, Osaka, Japan	
21	Win	15–5–1	Norihito Tanaka	SD	8	31 Oct 2007	Korakuen Hall, Tokyo, Japan	
20	Win	14–5–1	Masayoshi Segawa	MD	6	29 Aug 2007	Korakuen Hall, Tokyo, Japan	
19	Win	13–5–1	Masaki Yamawaki	UD	10	11 Feb 2007	IMP Hall, Osaka, Japan	
18	Win	12–5–1	Tatsuma Ohora	TKO	1 (10), 2:18	8 Oct 2006	IMP Hall, Osaka, Japan	
17	Win	11–5–1	Kazuma Kumata	SD	10	9 Apr 2006	IMP Hall, Osaka, Japan	
16	Win	10–5–1	Daisuke Iida	SD	10	16 Oct 2005	IMP Hall, Osaka, Japan	
15	Draw	9–5–1	Shigetaka Ikehara	MD	8	17 May 2005	Korakuen Hall, Tokyo, Japan	
14	Win	9–5	Atsushi Fujimura	TKO	6 (6), 2:46	26 Feb 2005	Prefectural Gymnasium, Osaka, Japan	
13	Loss	8–5	Yasuto Aritomi	SD	6	11 Oct 2004	Prefectural Gymnasium, Osaka, Japan	
12	Win	8–4	Ryohei Moriei	UD	6	4 Sep 2004	Prefectural Gymnasium, Osaka, Japan	
11	Win	7–4	Daisuke Kawashita	KO	2 (4), 1:43	1 Aug 2004	IMP Hall, Osaka, Japan	
10	Win	6–4	Kaisuke Akagi	UD	4	13 Jun 2004	Azalea Taisho, Osaka, Japan	
9	Win	5–4	Kazuya Okumura	UD	4	25 Apr 2004	KBS Hall, Kyoto, Japan	
8	Win	4–4	Goro Tachibana	UD	4	14 Dec 2003	Azalea Taisho, Osaka, Japan	
7	Loss	3–4	Masatsugu Okada	UD	4	18 Apr 2003	Central Gym, Osaka, Japan	
6	Win	3–3	Hideto Yamamoto	UD	4	11 Aug 2002	Azalea Taisho, Osaka, Japan	
5	Loss	2–3	Kosuke Fujiwara	PTS	4	9 Nov 2001	Prefectural Gymnasium, Osaka, Japan	
4	Loss	2–2	Hiroaki Kusunoki	PTS	4	22 Jul 2001	Mizuno Sports, Osaka, Japan	
3	Win	2–1	Hidehiko Tonai	PTS	4	22 Apr 2001	Prefectural Gymnasium, Osaka, Japan	
2	Loss	1–1	Naoya Kishidagx	PTS	4	4 Sep 2000	Prefectural Gymnasium, Osaka, Japan	
1	Win	1–0	Minoru Okada	KO	2 (4), 0:33	7 Apr 2000	Prefectural Gymnasium, Osaka, Japan	

== Fighting style ==
Horikawa is known for being a disciplined yet rough brawler; Horikawa has some speed and technical abilities, being creative with his shots. Due to him being a veteran, he is experienced and was a skilled fighter.

== Personal life ==
Horikawa, born on 10 March 1980, was born and raised in the Kyoto Prefecture, in 2000. When he first engaged in professional boxing, he was trained and managed under the SF Maki Boxing Gym in Kyoto, however, he would switch to the accredited Misako Boxing Gym in Tokyo in 2017, seventeen years into his professional career. Although Horikawa was already blooming in his 30s, having more notable success than otherwise, his move to the Misako Boxing Gym seemed to have sealed the deal, where he found his newfound power, knocking out opponents and finding more success.
