= Jonathan González (flyweight) =

Puerto Rican boxer (born 1991)

Personal information
- Nickname: Bomba ("Bomb")
- Born: Jonathan González Ortiz; April 24, 1991 (age 35) The Bronx, New York, U.S.
- Height: 5 ft 2 in (157 cm)
- Weight: Light flyweight; Flyweight

Boxing career
- Reach: 62 in (157 cm)
- Stance: Southpaw

Boxing record
- Total fights: 35
- Wins: 29
- Win by KO: 14
- Losses: 5
- Draws: 1
- No contests: 1
Medal record
Men's Boxing
Representing Puerto Rico
Youth World Championships
Gold medal – first place	2008 Guadalajara	Flyweight
Central American and Caribbean Games
Gold medal – first place	2010 Mayagüez	Flyweight

Jonathan González Ortiz (born April 24, 1991) is a Puerto Rican professional boxer who held the World Boxing Organization (WBO) junior flyweight title from 2021 to 2024. As an amateur, González won gold medals at the 2008 Youth World Championships and the 2010 Central American and Caribbean Games, both at flyweight.

== Early life ==
González was introduced to boxing at age four by his father, Luis González, who was a pugilist himself, having won Golden Glove awards in 1980 and 1982. When he was four years old, he began training along his progenitor. González's mother died during his youth. After entering competitive circuits, he began dedicating some of his biggest wins to her. González trained in Orlando Piñeiro's gymnasium, often sparring with both amateurs and professionals. In November 2008, Piñeiro emphasized the dedication that the pugilist invested during workouts, claiming that as an amateur, he had been able to knockout professionals adversaries during sparring.

== Amateur career ==
=== AIBA Youth World Championship and national titles ===
In 2008, González won Puerto Rico's youth national championship. González's first senior competition was the XI José "Cheo" Aponte Tournament, which began on May 20, 2008. Where he lost to Pan American medallist, Juan Carlos Payano, in the quarterfinals by scores of 16:14. On October 29, 2008, González debuted in the International Boxing Association's Youth World Championships. In his first contest, he defeated Kyle Freiberg of Australia by points, 10:0. On October 30, 2008, González was paired against Welbeth Loberanis of the Philippines, winning 18:5. In the third date, he competed against Almas Zhakipov of Kazakhstan, winning his closest decision of the tournament, 14:11. In the semifinals, González defeated Adam López of the United States, 11:5. With this performance, he advanced to the finals, facing the winner of the other branch, Yuniel Robles of Cuba. González won the Youth World Championship against Robles, defeating him with scores of 12:5. With this victory, he joined John John Molina, Aníbal Santiago Acevedo, Carlos Febres and Daniel Alicea as Puerto Rican gold medalists in this competition. Upon returning to Puerto Rico, González was surprised to encounter a large welcoming ceremony, which included the presence of his stablemate Juan Manuel López. His next competition was the Torneo Nacional de Boxeo Aficionado Isaac Barrientos, Puerto Rico's national championship tournament. The semifinals took place on February 21, 2009, where González defeated Carlos Narváez (8:5) to advance. In the finals, he was matched against Pan American and Central American champion, McWilliams Arroyo. Early in the contest, González was able to use his speed and counterattack to establish control of the fight’s tempo, winning the first round 3:0. This pattern continued in the next stanza, where he was able to score six more points, including three in only eighteen seconds, before his opponent scored his first point. Arroyo attempted to pressure the fight on the third, reducing the difference to 9:4, before González had one final advance, securing the final score of 11:5. Following this competition, he served as a sparring partner for Juan Manuel López, who was preparing for a defense against Gerry Peñalosa. The pugilist was selected due to his speed.

=== Eliminatory tournaments and regional title ===
González's returned to action at the XII José "Cheo" Aponte Tournament, which began on May 19, 2009. Prior to the competition, the local media emphasized the rematch between him and Arroyo, labeling them as "nemesis". González debuted on the tournament's third date, defeating Patricio Calero of Ecuador by points, 10:9. After advancing to the finals, he was matched against Arroyo, who won the second bracket. On this fight, Arroyo was able to win by points, gathering rounds of 6:3, 12:6 and 17:9. The fight was described as "frenetic" and saw a change in strategy by González, who attempted to pressure the offensive. Immediately afterwards, both pugilists competed in a third contest as part of the first Juan Evangelista Venegas Olympic Cup. This event was organized by the Olympic Committee of Puerto Rico (COPUR), serving as the final qualifier to determine who would enter Puerto Rico’s national team in preparation for the 2009 World Amateur Boxing Championships. The first two rounds concluded with a close score of 5:4, which favored Arroyo. In the third round, González connected a right hook and scored a knockdown. Arroyo stood up while still affected by the punch and was forced to receive a protective count following another offensive barrage. With the score favoring him by two points 7:5, González scored three more times, while Arroyo was only able to do so once, securing a final score of 10:6. In his next contest, he lost an unexpected decision to Carlos Ortíz. When the Federación de Boxeo Aficionado de Puerto Rico (lit. "Amateur Boxing Federation of Puerto Rico") selected Arroyo to participate in the World Amateur Boxing Championships, González openly expressed disappointment and briefly considered becoming a professional.

In February 2010, González entered the 2010 Torneo Nacional de Boxeo Aficionado Isaac Barrientos to defend the flyweight national championship. On his first date, he defeated Kidany Reyes by walkover, advancing to the finals while an eliminatory was held on the other bracket. In the finals, González fought Edwin Rodríguez of Juana Díaz's Gimnasio Collores, winning the contest by points (12:3) to earn his second consecutive title. As a member of the national pre-selection, he was entered in the XIII José "Cheo" Aponte Tournament, debuting with a 10:0 victory over Jovany Camacho of Ecuador. In the semifinals he defeated Julião Neto of Brasil (6:2). González won the event, defeating fellow Puerto Rican Edwin Rodríguez, five points to none. This result guaranteed his inclusion in the national team. Puerto Rico participated in the Campeonato Panamericano Elite in Ecuador, using it as a preparatory for the 2010 Central American and Caribbean Games. González won his first match against the contestant of the Dominican Republic, but lost a close decision (5:6) in a rematch against Neto at the semifinals. At the Central American and Caribbean Games, he received a bye at the first day of preliminaries. In his debut, González defeated William Alcantara of the Dominican Republic by points (18:8) to secure a medal. In the semifinals, he advanced by defeating (8:3) Dexter Jordan of Guyana. In the finals, González fought Ceiber Ávila, opening the first round ahead 6:1. Ávila was frustrated by this disadvantage, connecting a low blow that cost him two points. González continued aggressive to close the third round, finishing with scores of 19:5 to secure the gold medal. His final amateur contest took place in December 2010, where he defeated Adam López (7:1) of the United States as part of a dual.

== Professional career ==
=== WBO NABO flyweight champion ===
==== First title reign ====
González fought for the WBO NABO flyweight title for the second time in his career on February 23, 2018, when he was scheduled to face Ricardo Rodriguez for the vacant belt. The fight was broadcast by Boxeo Telemundo, as part of their 30th anniversary show. He won the fight by split decision, with two scorecards of 96-93 and 95-94 for González, while the third judge scored it 95-94 in favor of Rodriguez. Rodriguez appeared to lag behind in the middle rounds, after managing to knock Rodriguez down in the third round, but was able to rally behind in the final three rounds.

González was scheduled to make the first defense of his secondary title against Julian Yedras on July 20, 2018, and was once again broadcast by Boxeo Telemundo. González won the fight by a dominant unanimous decision, with all three judges awarding him every single round of the fight. González called out the WBO flyweight titleholder during his post-fight interview, stating "I believe I am capable of fighting for a world title, especially against Sho Kimura".

González made his second WBO NABO flyweight title defense against the two-time WBO light flyweight title challenger Juan Alejo on November 16, 2018, and was broadcast by Boxeo Telemundo. González won the fight by an eight-round technical knockout. He first knocked Alejo down with a left in the sixth round, before forcing Alejo's corner to throw in the towel with a barrage of punches.

==== González vs. Tanaka ====
González was rewarded for his two successful title defenses with the right to challenge the incumbent WBO flyweight titleholder Kosei Tanaka. The bout was scheduled to take place on August 24, 2019, at the Takeda Teva Ocean Arena in Nagoya, Japan, and was González's first fight outside of the American continents. It was broadcast by Chubu-Nippon Broadcasting in Japan, and by RingTV.com internationally. González entered the fight as an +450 underdog, while Tanaka was seen as the -800 favorite by most odds-makers. González's speed and southpaw stance managed to give Tanaka some trouble in the early going, before the pair traded knockdowns in the third round. Tanaka began to take over from that point forward, and stopped González in the seventh round, knocking him down three times before the referee was forced to wave the fight away.

==== Second title reign ====
Following his failed title bid, González once against fought for the vacant WBO NABO light flyweight title on February 21, 2020, against Saul Juarez. The bout was broadcast by Boxeo Telemundo, during their first event of the year. Gonzalez won the fight by unanimous decision, with two scorecards of 96-94 and one scorecard of 98-92.

González was scheduled to make the first title defense of his second WBO NABO title reign against the #15 ranked WBO and #3 WBC ranked flyweight Armando Torres. The fight was set for May 21, 2021, over a year since his last fight, and was broadcast by Boxeo Telemundo. He scored his quickest finish since May 16, 2016, stopping Torres with a body shot in the fourth-round.

=== WBO light flyweight champion ===
==== González vs. Soto ====
On July 7, 2021, the World Boxing Organization ordered the reigning WBO light flyweight champion Elwin Soto to begin negotiations with mandatory challenger González. The two camps were given a 20-day negotiation period in order to work out terms. As they were unable to come to an agreement, the WBO gave them a 48 hours status update period to determine whether a purse bid would be held. The negotiation period was extended to August 9, before an $80,000-minimum purse bid would be held. All Star Boxing (Gonzalez’s promoter) and Matchroom Boxing (Soto’s promoter) came to an agreement on August 8, therefore avoiding the purse bid.

The fight was officially announced for September 18, 2021, at a TBA location and venue in United States. On August 30, 2021, it was revealed that the fight was postponed due to an undisclosed reason, and was instead rescheduled for October 16, 2021, and was to be broadcast by DAZN. González was seen as a significant underdog, with most odds-makers having him as a -900 or -1000 underdog.

González won his second WBO light flyweight title bid by split decision. Judges Robert Hoyle and Zachary Young awarded him an identical scorecard of 116-112, while judge Daniel Sandoval awarded the same scorecard to Soto. Soto was unable to successfully pressure and land on the outfighting Gonzalez, and had most success in the middle rounds when he was able to exchange with González. Soto was given a final warning in the ninth round for intentionally twisting Gonzalez’s left arm during a clinch, although no points were deducted.

==== González vs. Barriga ====
González was booked to make his first light flyweight title defense against the one-time IBF mini flyweight title challenger Mark Anthony Barriga. The title fight headlined a ProBox TV show which took place in the Osceola Heritage Park in Kissimmee, Florida, on June 24, 2022. González retained the title by unanimous decision, with scores of 115–113, 115–113 and 117–111. Despite a slow start to the fight, during which time Barriga was able to successfully land counters, González began to take over as the fight went on, while Barriga faded late.

==== González vs. Iwata ====
On July 9, 2022, González submitted a formal request to the WBO to make a voluntary title defense at the "WBO Night of Champions" event, which would allow him to fight in his native country, as the show is planned to take place in Carolina, Puerto Rico. As there were no mandatory title challengers at the time the request was made, González would've been allowed to face any ranked contender of his choosing. On September 3, however, it was announced that González would instead make his second title defense against the second-ranked WBO light flyweight contender Shokichi Iwata. The title bout was scheduled as the co-main event of the Kenshiro Teraji and Hiroto Kyoguchi unification match, which took place on November 1. González retained the title by unanimous decision, with scores of 116–112, 116–112 and 117–111.

==== González vs. Santiago ====
On January 11, 2023, WBC light-flyweight mandatory challenger Hekkie Budler accepted an undisclosed step-aside fee, which allowed González to enter into negotiations with the unified WBC and WBA champion Kenshiro Teraji. The title unification bout is scheduled to take place on April 8, 2023, in Tokyo, Japan. González withdrew from the bout on March 24, after contracting mycoplasma pneumonia. On August 2, 2023, it was revealed that González would instead face Rene "El Chulo" Santiago. As this fight likewise fell through, González was booked to make his third title defense against the #10 ranked WBO light flyweight contender Leyman Benavides on October 27, 2023, at the Alexis Arguello Sports Complex in Managua, Nicaragua. Benavides fell ill a month before the fight and was replaced by Gerardo Zapata. González withdrew from the fight, due to an undisclosed illness, on October 26. The card's co-main event between Rene Santiago and Kevin Vivas was promoted to an interim WBO light-flyweight clash, with the winner given assurance they would face the champion within 180 days. On November 8, the WBO ordered González to make a mandatory title defense against the recently crowned interim titlist Rene Santiago. The bout took place on March 2, 2024, at the José Miguel Agrelot Coliseum in San Juan, Puerto Rico. Gonzalez defeated Rene Santiago by unanimous decision and made the third successful defense of his WBO light flyweight title.

==== González vs. Olascuaga ====
On October 14, 2024, González challenged WBO flyweight champion Anthony Olascuaga at Ariake Arena in Tokyo, Japan. The fight ended in unusual circumstances when González refused to continue the bout after suffering a cut due to a clash of heads in the first round. Initially ruled a no contest, the result was changed to a technical knockout win for Olascuaga two weeks later.

==== González vs. Rivera ====
González faced Yankiel Rivera for the vacant WBA interim flyweight title at Coliseo Roberto Clemente in San Juan, Puerto Rico, on January 3, 2026, winning by unanimous decision.

==== González vs. Perez ====
González lost his WBA Interim flyweight title to Abraham Perez on a split decision at GLC Live At 20 Monroe in Grand Rapids, Michigan, United States, on June 14, 2026.

== Professional boxing record ==
36 fights	29 wins	5 losses
By knockout	14	4
By decision	15	1
Draws	1	
No contests	1	

No.	Result	Record	Opponent	Type	Round, time	Date	Location	Notes
36	Loss	29–5–1 (1)	Abraham Perez	SD	12	Jun 14, 2026	GLC Live At 20 Monroe, Grand Rapids, Michigan, U.S.	Lost WBA interim flyweight title
35	Win	29–4–1 (1)	Yankiel Rivera	UD	12	Jan 3, 2026	Roberto Clemente Coliseum, San Juan, Puerto Rico	Won vacant WBA interim flyweight title
34	Loss	28–4–1 (1)	Anthony Olascuaga	TKO	1 (12), 2:25	Oct 14, 2024	Ariake Arena, Tokyo, Japan	For WBO flyweight title; González quit after accidental headbutt
33	Win	28–3–1 (1)	René Santiago	UD	12	Mar 2, 2024	José Miguel Agrelot Coliseum, San Juan, Puerto Rico	Retained WBO light flyweight title
32	Win	27–3–1 (1)	Shokichi Iwata	UD	12	Nov 1, 2022	Super Arena, Saitama, Japan	Retained WBO light flyweight title
31	Win	26–3–1 (1)	Mark Anthony Barriga	UD	12	Jun 24, 2022	Osceola Heritage Center, Kissimmee, Florida, U.S.	Retained WBO light flyweight title
30	Win	25–3–1 (1)	Elwin Soto	SD	12	Oct 16, 2021	Chukchansi Park, Fresno, California, U.S.	Won WBO light flyweight title
29	Win	24–3–1 (1)	Armando Torres	TKO	4 (10)	May 21, 2021	Bryan Glazer Family JCC Auditorium, Tampa, Florida, U.S.	Retained WBO–NABO light flyweight title
28	Win	23–3–1 (1)	Saúl Juárez	UD	10	Feb 21, 2020	Miccosukee Resort & Gaming, Miami, Florida, U.S.	Won vacant WBO–NABO light flyweight title
27	Loss	22–3–1 (1)	Kosei Tanaka	TKO	7 (12), 2:59	Aug 24, 2019	Takeda Teva Ocean Arena, Nagoya, Japan	For WBO flyweight title
26	Win	22–2–1 (1)	Juan Alejo	TKO	8 (10)	Nov 16, 2018	Osceola Heritage Center, Kissimmee, Florida, U.S.	Retained WBO–NABO flyweight title
25	Win	21–2–1 (1)	Julian Yedras	UD	10	Jul 20, 2018	Osceola Heritage Center, Kissimmee, Florida, U.S.	Retained WBO–NABO flyweight title
24	Win	20–2–1 (1)	Ricardo Rodriguez	SD	10	Feb 23, 2018	Osceola Heritage Center, Kissimmee, Florida, U.S.	Won vacant WBO–NABO flyweight title
23	Win	19–2–1 (1)	Samuel Gutierrez	UD	6	Mar 4, 2017	Coliseo Fernando 'Rube' Hernández, Gurabo, Puerto Rico	
22	Loss	18–2–1 (1)	Jobert Alvarez	KO	6 (10)	Mar 19, 2016	Mario Morales Coliseum, Guaynabo, Puerto Rico	For vacant WBO–NABO flyweight title
21	Win	18–1–1 (1)	Carlos Ruben Dario Ruiz	SD	10	Oct 16, 2015	Estadio José María Gatica, Villa Mercedes, Argentina	Won vacant WBC Latino flyweight title
20	Win	17–1–1 (1)	Miguel Del Valle	RTD	2 (10)	May 16, 2015	Coliseo Pedrin Zorrilla, San Juan, Puerto Rico	
19	Win	16–1–1 (1)	Erickson Martell	UD	10	Feb 28, 2015	Coliseo Francisco ‘Rube’ Hernández, Gurabo, Puerto Rico	Won NABA light flyweight title
18	Win	15–1–1 (1)	Omar Soto	UD	8	Nov 14, 2014	Roberto Clemente Coliseum, San Juan, Puerto Rico	
17	Win	14–1–1 (1)	Miguel Del Valle	UD	6	Aug 30, 2014	Auditorio Juan Pachín Vicéns, Ponce, Puerto Rico	
16	Draw	13–1–1 (1)	Michael Ruiz Jr.	MD	8	May 29, 2014	Buffalo Convention Center, Buffalo, New York, U.S.	
15	Loss	13–1 (1)	Giovani Segura	KO	4 (10)	Aug 17, 2013	El San Juan Resort and Casino, Isla Verde, Puerto Rico	
14	Win	13–0 (1)	Francisco Perez Cardenas	UD	8	Apr 20, 2013	Arena Ciudad de México, Mexico City, Mexico	
13	Win	12–0 (1)	Joseph Rios	TKO	3 (10)	Mar 23, 2013	Cancha Ruben Zayas Montanez, Trujillo Alto, Puerto Rico	
12	NC	11–0 (1)	Omar Salado	NC	1 (10)	Feb 2, 2013	Coliseo Rubén Rodríguez, Bayamon, Puerto Rico	
11	Win	11–0	Danny Flores	TKO	6 (6)	Oct 19, 2012	Civic Center, Kissimmee, Florida, U.S.	
10	Win	10–0	Saul Eduardo Hernandez	TKO	2 (6)	Aug 18, 2012	La Cetto Vineyard, Valle de Guadalupe, Mexico	
9	Win	9–0	Erickson Martell	TKO	2 (8)	Mar 10, 2012	Roberto Clemente Coliseum, San Juan, Puerto Rico	
8	Win	8–0	Samuel Gutierrez	TKO	5 (6)	Feb 3, 2012	Coliseo Luis Aymat, San Sebastian, Puerto Rico	
7	Win	7–0	Jose Rivera	UD	6	Oct 22, 2011	WaMu Theater, New York City, New York, U.S.	
6	Win	6–0	Manuel Galaviz	KO	2 (6)	Oct 7, 2011	Coliseo Rebekah Colberg Cabrera, Cabo Rojo, Puerto Rico	
5	Win	5–0	Ramon Emilio Cedano	KO	1 (6)	Sep 16, 2011	Polideportivo, San Francisco de Macoris, Dominican Republic	
4	Win	4–0	Gabriel Cruz	KO	2 (4)	Aug 5, 2011	Mario Morales Coliseum, Guaynabo, Puerto Rico	
3	Win	3–0	Ivan Moxey	TKO	2 (4)	Jun 3, 2011	Coliseo Antonio R. Barcelo, Toa Baja, Puerto Rico	
2	Win	2–0	Elvin Caldero	TKO	1 (4)	Apr 16, 2011	Coliseo Rubén Rodríguez, Bayamon, Puerto Rico	
1	Win	1–0	Jonathan Gonzalez	TKO	1 (4)	Apr 1, 2011	Coliseo Héctor Solá Bezares, Caguas, Puerto Rico	

== See also ==
- List of male boxers
- List of southpaw stance boxers
- Boxing in Puerto Rico
- List of Puerto Rican boxing world champions
- List of world light-flyweight boxing champions

Sporting positions
Regional boxing titles
Vacant Title last held by Martin Armenta Chaparro	NABA light-flyweight champion February 28, 2015 – 2015; Vacated	Vacant
Vacant Title last held by Keyvin Lara	WBC latino flyweight champion October 16, 2015 – 2015; Vacated	Vacant Title next held by Ganigan López
Vacant Title last held by Jobert Alvarez	NABO flyweight champion February 23, 2018 – 2019; Vacated	Vacant Title next held by Juan Carlos Camacho Rivera
Vacant Title last held by Hugo Cázares	NABO light flyweight champion February 21, 2020 – 2021; Vacated	Vacant
World boxing titles
Preceded by Elwin Soto	WBO light-flyweight champion October 16, 2021 – June 19, 2024; Vacated	Vacant Title next held by Shokichi Iwata
Vacant Title last held by Luis Concepción	WBA flyweight champion Interim title January 3, 2026 – present	Incumbent
