= Elwin Soto =

Mexican boxer (born 1996)

Personal information
- Nickname: La Pulga
- Born: Elwin Soto Castro; December 23, 1996 (age 29) San Felipe, Mexico
- Height: 5 ft 3 in (160 cm)
- Weight: Light flyweight; Flyweight

Boxing career
- Stance: Orthodox

Boxing record
- Total fights: 24
- Wins: 21
- Win by KO: 13
- Losses: 3

Elwin Soto Castro (born December 23, 1996) is a Mexican professional boxer who held the WBO junior flyweight title from 2019 to 2021.

== Professional career ==
=== WBO junior flyweight champion ===
==== Soto vs. Acosta ====
Soto was scheduled to fight the reigning WBO light flyweight champion Ángel Acosta on June 21, 2019, in Acosta's fourth title defense. Soto was at the time the #15 ranked WBO light flyweight contender, and was considered a significant underdog going into the Acosta fight. Going into the twelfth round, Acosta was leading on the scorecards by 105–103, 106-102 and 107–101, while Soto managed to knock the champion down in the third round. Soto staggered Acosta with a left hook in the last round, and piled on volume, before referee Thomas Taylor abruptly stopped the fight at 23 seconds. The stoppage was considered controversial, as Acosta immediately protested the stoppage and didn't seem to be visibly hurt.

==== Soto vs. Heno ====
Soto was scheduled to make his first title defense against Edward Heno on October 24, 2019. The fight was set as the main event of the Golden Boy DAZN Thursday Night Fights. Soto won the closely contested fight, during which he was knocked down in the third round, by unanimous decision. The judges' scorecards reflected the close nature of the bout, with scores of 114–113, 115–112, and 115–112.

Soto moved up to flyweight for his next fight, being scheduled to fight Javier Alejandro Rendon in a non-title bout. Rendon's last three fights were at bantamweight, so the fight represented a move in weight for both fighters. Soto made quick work of his opponent, knocking him out with a body shot near the end of the first round.

==== Soto vs. Buitrago ====
For his second title defense, Soto was scheduled to fight the three-time world title challenger Carlos Buitrago, on October 30, 2020. Soto won the fight by a competitive unanimous decision, keeping his opponent at bay with his jab and power. Although one judge scored the bout 119–109, media outlets found the scores of 117-111 and 115–113 as more reflective of the contest.

His victory against Buitrago was Soto's final fight under contract with Golden Boy Promotions, after which he signed with Matchroom Boxing USA. His signature with Matchroom opened the road to a title unification bout with Hiroto Kyoguchi, who was likewise under contract with Matchroom Boxing.

==== Soto vs. Takayama ====
For his third title defense, Soto was scheduled to fight the former five-time minimumweight world champion Katsunari Takayama, on May 8, 2021. Takuyama was ranked #11 by the IBF. The fight was set as the co-main event to the super middleweight title unification bout between Canelo Álvarez and Billy Joe Saunders. The fight was competitive throughout the first eight rounds, before Soto upped the volume in the ninth. The fight was stopped near the end of the round, despite Takayama returning shots and not being visibly hurt. The stoppage was considered highly controversial and referee Laurence Cole came under severe criticism.

==== Soto vs. Gonzalez ====
Soto was ordered to face the WBO junior flyweight mandatory title challenger Jonathan 'Bomba' Gonzalez on July 9, 2021. WBO gave the two of them a 20-day negotiation period in order to work out terms. As the two sides were unable to work out a deal, WBO extended the negotiation period to August 9, before the fight would go into an $80,000-minimum purse bid. All Star Boxing (Gonzalez's promoter) and Matchroom Boxing (Soto's promoter) came to an agreement on August 8, therefore avoiding the purse bid. The fight was officially announced for October 16, 2021, to be fought on the undercard of the Mikey Garcia versus Sandor Martin catchweight bout. Soto lost the fight by split decision, with two judges awarding Gonzalez a 116-112 scorecard, while the third judge scored the fight 116-112 for Soto. Soto was unable to successfully pressure and land on the outfighting Gonzalez, who appeared out of danger for the majority of the bout.

=== Post-championship career ===
Soto was scheduled to face Hekkie Budler in the main event of a TV Azteca broadcast card on June 25, 2022, at the Palenque del FEX in Mexicali, Mexico in a WBC light flyweight title eliminator. Soto lost the fight by unanimous decision, with all three judges scoring the fight 114–113 for Budler. Budler created a lot of problems for Soto with his boxing ability. Soto was knocked down in the twelfth round, which proved crucial on the official scorecards.

Soto is scheduled to face Moises Caro for WBO Latino light flyweight title in Mexicali, Mexico on November 23, 2024.

== Professional boxing record ==
26 fights	21 wins	4 losses
By knockout	13	0
By decision	8	4
Draws	1	

No.	Result	Record	Opponent	Type	Round, time	Date	Location	Notes
26	Loss	21–4–1	Erik Badillo	UD	10	Nov 29, 2025	Save Mart Arena, Fresno, California, USA	
25	Draw	21–3–1	Moises Caro	SD	10	Nov 23, 2024	Plaza de Toros Calafia, Mexicali, Baja California, Mexico	For WBO Latino Junior Flyweight Title
24	Win	21–3	Jose Armenta	UD	10	Nov 11, 2023	San Felipe, Mexico	
23	Win	20–3	Brian Mosinos	SD	10	May 13, 2023	Durango, Mexico	
22	Loss	19–3	Hekkie Budler	UD	12	Jun 25, 2022	Palenque del FEX, Mexicali, Mexico	
21	Loss	19–2	Jonathan González	SD	12	Oct 16, 2021	Chukchansi Park, Fresno, California, US	Lost WBO junior flyweight title
20	Win	19–1	Katsunari Takayama	TKO	9 (12), 2:44	May 8, 2021	AT&T Stadium, Arlington, Texas, US	Retained WBO junior flyweight title
19	Win	18–1	Carlos Buitrago	UD	12	Oct 30, 2020	Fantasy Springs Resort Casino, Indio, California, US	Retained WBO junior flyweight title
18	Win	17–1	Javier Alejandro Rendon	KO	1 (10), 2:41	Feb 15, 2020	Auditorio del Estado, Mexicali, Mexico	
17	Win	16–1	Edward Heno	UD	12	Oct 24, 2019	Fantasy Springs Resort Casino, Indio, California, US	Retained WBO junior flyweight title
16	Win	15–1	Ángel Acosta	KO	12 (12), 0:23	Jun 21, 2019	Fantasy Springs Resort Casino, Indio, California, US	Won WBO junior flyweight title
15	Win	14–1	Joel Castro Cano	KO	4 (10), 1:37	May 4, 2019	Salon de Eventos del Hotel Posada del Sol, San Felipe, Mexico	
14	Win	13–1	Edgar Ornelas	TKO	1 (8), 3:00	Feb 16, 2019	Salon de Eventos del Hotel Posada del Sol, San Felipe, Mexico	
13	Win	12–1	Erick Gonzalez Hernandez	KO	6 (6), 1:10	Dec 22, 2018	Auditorio Municipal, Tijuana, Mexico	
12	Win	11–1	Omar Martinez Hernandez	UD	6	Oct 6, 2018	Gasmart Stadium, Tijuana, Mexico	
11	Win	10–1	Mario Rodriguez	UD	8	Jul 28, 2018	Auditorio Municipal, Tijuana, Mexico	
10	Win	9–1	Jorge Miguel Hernandez	TKO	2 (6), 1:56	Jun 9, 2018	Auditorio Municipal, Tijuana, Mexico	
9	Win	8–1	Wilfredo Guerrero	KO	2 (6), 1:07	Jun 2, 2018	Hotel Posada del Mar, San Felipe, Mexico	
8	Win	7–1	Jesus Hernandez Sierra	TKO	4 (10), 2:47	Feb 17, 2018	Domo del Parque San Rafael, Guadalajara, Mexico	
7	Win	6–1	Pedro Verdin	TKO	4 (6), 2:41	Oct 14, 2017	Salon de Eventos del Hotel Posada del Sol, San Felipe, Mexico	
6	Win	5–1	Bryan Hernandez	TKO	1 (6), 0:32	May 13, 2017	Hotel Posada del Mar, San Felipe, Mexico	
5	Win	4–1	Jesus Hernandez Sierra	PTS	6	Apr 7, 2017	Gimnasio Usos Múltiples UdeG, Guadalajara, Mexico	
4	Win	3–1	Alejandro Esqueda	TKO	1 (6), 0:48	Mar 25, 2017	Gimnasio Usos Múltiples UdeG, Guadalajara, Mexico	
3	Loss	2–1	Danny Andujo	UD	4	Feb 11, 2017	Renaissance Hotel, Palm Springs, California, US	
2	Win	2–0	Erick Jovani Negrete	TKO	1 (4), 0:41	Nov 19, 2016	Salon de Eventos del Hotel Posada del Sol, San Felipe, Mexico	
1	Win	1–0	Efrain Gonzalez	UD	6	Oct 15, 2016	Salón Social Posada del Mar, San Felipe, Mexico	

== See also ==
- List of world light-flyweight boxing champions
- List of Mexican boxing world champions

Sporting positions
World boxing titles
Preceded by Ángel Acosta	WBO light flyweight champion June 21, 2019 – Oct 16, 2021	Succeeded by Jonathan González
