= Ángel Acosta =

Puerto Rican professional boxer (born 1990)

Personal information
- Nickname: Tito
- Nationality: Puerto Rican
- Born: Ángel Acosta Gómez; October 8, 1990 (age 35) San Juan, Puerto Rico
- Height: 5 ft 4 in (163 cm)
- Weight: Light flyweight; Flyweight; Super Flyweight

Boxing career
- Reach: 64 in (163 cm)
- Stance: Orthodox

Boxing record
- Total fights: 29
- Wins: 24
- Win by KO: 22
- Losses: 5
Medal record
Men's amateur boxing
Representing Puerto Rico
Central American and Caribbean Games
Gold medal – first place	2010 Mayagüez	Light flyweight

Ángel Acosta Gómez (born October 8, 1990) is a Puerto Rican professional boxer who held the WBO light flyweight title from 2017 to 2019. As an amateur, Acosta won the gold medal at the 2010 Central American and Caribbean Games.

== Early life ==
Acosta was born the seventh out of nine siblings. He was raised in a low-income working class area known as Barrio Obrero in the capital of San Juan. His family was very poor, a situation that Acosta channeled by becoming involved in scuffles both at school and in the streets. His older brother, amateur boxer Luis A. Gómez, noticed this behavior and took him to Barrio Obrero's gymnasium in late 1999, where he began training in the sport. While growing up, Acosta followed the careers of welterweight trio Félix Trinidad, Miguel Cotto and Daniel Santos while also admiring the technical prowess of Iván Calderón. During this timeframe, the family moved to a public housing project known as Las Gladiolas, where he met fellow boxer Félix Verdejo. The elder sibling managed Acosta throughout his early amateur career, but died suddenly in 2005. Another of his siblings also died, while the eldest left to live abroad. To support his mother, María del Carmen Gómez, he opted to dropout in seventh grade, intending to find a way to earn enough money to repair an inherited house and resume his studies.

Acosta took to boxing full-time soon afterwards, challenging himself by training and sparring heavier adults as a teenager, among which was Erickson Martell. In 2008, he joined a volunteer program headed by AIBA referee José Bonet. Early in his adulthood, the family returned to Barrio Obrero. The sport brought him popularity within the community, which gained more traction after becoming the Central American and Caribbean amateur champion, something that contributes towards another of his stated goals; to become a "hero" for the community. While still an unproven professional in 2014, Acosta began working as a delivery boy for a local store named Michael Pizza at the behest of a friend. His familiarity with Barrio Obrero helped him perform this task, which he undertook as both a temporary hobby and an additional source of income for his immediate family and other expenses, but which took a backseat to training for his fights. As his name became more known, the pizzeria began receiving requests asking for Acosta specifically.

The circumstances of his upbringing have brought interest from the media, beginning in 2014 when Acosta was the subject of !Ti-to!, a short documentary directed by Ángel Manuel Soto and filmed as part Huffington Post's RYOT initiative. Sponsored by Apple, the film was entirely shot using a smartphone camera. Two years later, he was the titular topic of El Púgil, an extended biographical documentary about the same subject created by Soto, which was distributed by the local Fine Arts cinema and was featured at the Tribeca Film Festival. Even after advancing far enough in his professional career to be considered a contender, Acosta insisted that he had no intention of moving away from Barrio Obrero, with the local gym still serving as the main base of his camps with trainer Javier Arce.

== Amateur career ==
Once part of the Puerto Rico national program, Acosta's style grew more technical under the tutelage of José Laureano and Víctor Ortiz. In the semifinals of the 2009 José "Cheo" Aponte Cup, he lost an 11:11+ tiebreaker to compatriot Waldemar Rodriguez. On July 5, 2009, Acosta competed in the finals of the Copa Olímpica Juan Evangelista Venegas, an annual tournament held by the Puerto Rico Olympic Committee (COPUR), losing to Emmanuel Rodríguez by RSC in two rounds. On October 8, 2009, Acosta participated in a tournament held between the national teams of Puerto Rico and Canada, defeating Ahmed Karatella 16:6 fighting in the flyweight division. On October 17, 2009, Acosta participated in one of the Programa Comunidad Dominicana de PR events, defeating Stanley Cordero of Cubuy Club by decision. In November, Acosta participated in the 2009 Cabo Joe Rivera Tournament representing the Metropolitan Region. He defeated Jerry Ortiz of Punta Borinquen by walkover to advance. In the finals, Acosta lost to Carlos Ortiz of the Southern Region in a 2:2+ tiebreaker, being edged 5:4.

In the senior flyweight division of the 2010 Isaac Barrientos Tournament, Acosta defeated Israel Vázquez (son of professional tri-division former champion Wilfredo Vázquez) with scores of 6:0 in the quarterfinals. He repeated the performance in the next round, this time against Bryan Aquino. Acosta won the national title by defeating Emanuel Ramírez in the finals. On April 25, 2010, Acosta lost a match to René Santiago of Punta Santiago, as part of an event where the national champions were evaluated. In May 2010, Acosta participated in the José "Cheo" Aponte Cup, advancing to the finals. In the quarterfinals of the 2010 Panamerican Championships, Acosta defeated Juan Rodríguez of Mexico in a 6:6+ tiebreaker. In the next round, he lost a 4:3 fight to Junior Zárate of Argentina. Acosta was selected Puerto Rico's representative in the light flyweight (106 pounds) division of the 2010 Central American and Caribbean Games. He debuted by defeating Arles Contreras of Colombia 7:2. A 14:4 semifinal victory over David Jiménez of Costa Rica followed. In the finals, Acosta defeated Alvaro Vargas of Guatemala with scores of 19:5 to win the tournament's gold medal. Afterwards, he was among the Metropolitan Region's boxers to receive a commendation for their performance in the event.

In October 2010, he participated in the La Romana Cup in the Dominican Republic, winning the event's bronze medal. In December, Acosta defeated Eros Correa of California in a tournament held by the Puerto Rico and United States national teams. In the 2010 Metropolitan Region Awards, Acosta was listed among the "Most Accomplished Adult Boxers" as his division's representative. In the opening round of the 2011 Isaac Barrientos Tournament, Acosta debuted by besting Desma Correa of Arecibo. However, he was among the defending champions dethroned that year, when he lost to Jantony Ortiz in the second preliminary round. In the 2011 Copa Olímpica, Acosta advanced to the semifinals by defeating Juan Gabriel Medina of the Dominican Republic 13:8. In the semifinals, he bested Anthony Chacón 16:11. Acosta lost the finals to Jantony Ortiz 11:7. His next tournament was the José "Cheo" Aponte Cup held only days later, where he advanced to the quarterfinals. In December 2011, Acosta suffered another defeat to Jantony Ortiz in the finals of the Juan Evangelista Venegas Tournament, this time with scores of 8:5, marking the third and last loss in a streak that propelled his opponent to the national team. Excluded from the 2012 American Boxing Olympic Qualification Tournament in favor of his opponent and thus unable to qualify for the 2012 Summer Olympics, Acosta decided to close an amateur career of 184 matches. He formally announced his intentions to join Javier Bustillo's Universal Promotions in a press conference, where it was informed that he would begin his professional career at a catchweight of 110 pounds.

== Professional career ==
=== Early career ===
Acosta made his professional debut on November 12, 2012, in Caguas, Puerto Rico, defeating Alexis Díaz by knockout in three rounds. He opened the following year with a second-round knockout of Christian López that won the card's "El Palo De La Noche de Palo Viejo" (equivalent to "Best KO") bonus prize. In June 2013, Acosta signed a promotional contract with Promociones Miguel Cotto (PMC) and H2 Entertainment, a firm property of the eponymous four-division world champion. Acosta next competed in his first fight abroad as a professional, defeating Domingo Berroa inside three rounds in a card held at La Romana, Dominican Republic. Despite these results, he publicly admitted that the adaptation to professional style was still ongoing. This was followed by another visit to this country, where he defeated José Adán Fernández in 1:17 as part of his first six-round contest. In his return to Puerto Rico, Acosta won a fourth-round knockout over Pedro Ortiz, whom he knocked down thrice in the final round. A rematch with Díaz concluded with the same result of their first encounter, with the stoppage taking place within 1:29 this time.

On June 14, 2014, Acosta made his New Jersey debut, scoring a first-round knockdown en route to a three-round win over Eduardo Valenzuela. A return to the Dominican Republic resulted in a second-round technical knockout over Eduardo Juan. Acosta then made his Texas debut, scoring a technical knockout over Víctor Ruíz, who suffered a severe injury in one of his eyes and was withdrawn by recomendación of the ringside doctor. His perfect knockout ratio reached double digits with a win over Armando Vázquez at Caguas, in what was his first titular fight where he won the World Boxing Council's FECARBOX Light Flyweight Championship. In the same municipality, Acosta stopped Luis Almendarez within the first round with a body shot. He then made his Florida debut, injuring Felipe Rivas in the first and finishing the fight two rounds later. Acosta then met former training partner Ericson Martell as part of a PMC vs. Universal Promotions card, winning by stoppage in the second round and retaining his title. This was followed by another early stoppage over Juan Gúzman, in a fight that lasted 1:24.

Acosta was then scheduled to compete in his second regional title fight, this time for the World Boxing Organization's (WBO) Latino Light Flyweight Championship, against Luis Armando Ceja. The entity later informed PMC that the winner would be in line to fight a top contender for a title shot. While Ceja dismissed him as merely a puncher, Acosta insisted that his streak would remain intact despite the former never being knocked out. Veteran trainer Jim Pagán joined the team prior to this fight. In the card that took place on November 12, 2016, Acosta scored a second round knockdown and followed suit to give Ceja the first knockout loss of his career. Immediately afterwards, WBO president Francisco Valcárcel confirmed that the win placed him on pace for a world title fight by May 2017.

The boxing style displayed during this stage of his career drew attention, in particular because of combining respectable speed with a type of power that was considered rare in the lower weight classes. Unlike most heavy hitters, who publicly dismiss knockouts as a byproduct of a good fight, Acosta was honest about the importance that he gave to the streak with which he began his career. His style also drew comparisons to other Puerto Rican boxers that had won titles in the minimumweight and strawweight divisions (105-108). When queried about the matter, Valcárcel asserted that Acosta was more advanced than José de Jesús, Josué Camacho, Alex Sánchez, Nelson Dieppa and Iván Calderón when they had the same quantity of fight. The functionary considered his punching power to that of Sánchez and that his technical skills were only second to Calderón among that group, considering him a superior version of De Jesús. Following his win over Ceja, Valcárcel also commented that his left hook was reminiscent of Wilfredo Gómez. Another to comment favorably on his speed and punching power was former world champion Carlos de León, who observed that they seemed to increase with each passing fight.

=== First eliminator and world title shot ===
Following the defeat of Ceja, the WBO ordered an eliminator match to determine the mandatory challenger for the division's world champion, Kosei Tanaka. Japhet Uutoni (12–1, 5 KOs) was set as the other fighter, difficulting the scouting effort of Acosta's team due to a lack of fight footage (only one of the Namibian's matches was online, and it was dated to 2005), due to this instead of devising a counterattack strategy they focused on preparing him for a much taller adversary by sparring with contender Yaniel Rivera. Particular attention was paid for the development of patience, with the boxer himself distancing from his previous stance on the streak and expressing that he would be satisfied with a decision win. On February 11, 2017, Acosta defeated Uutoni by tenth-round knockout in the main event of a card held at the Roger Mendoza Coliseum in Caguas, Puerto Rico. Prior to the stoppage, he scored knockdowns in the 2nd, 5th, 8th and 9th rounds. After the fight, Tanaka, who was in attendance, entered the ring and was involved in a promotional faceoff with Acosta.

Both would later hold amicable reunions at Barrio Obrero, and other promotional activities were made where the champion acknowledged that Acosta had "all around skills" and assessed that the punching power was superior to that of Moisés Fuentes, whom he had defeated priorly. Promociones Miguel Cotto negotiated to bring the fight to Puerto Rico or neutral ground, but the arrangements that Tanaka's promoter had done prior to the eliminator stood and the fight was formalized there. Acosta's first world title opportunity was scheduled to take place in the champion's home country of Japan, forcing the team to prepare him for his first journey to the eastern hemisphere by scientifically absorbing the hour difference over a span of two weeks, beginning the adaptation locally following a delay in the visa process. This development forced a four-day stay in New York and the rescheduling of his final sparring session to El Maestro Juan Laporte Gym in The Bronx, also fragmenting the group until trainers Javier Arce and Jim Pagán could travel there.

Minor adjustments were done to his in-ring behavior, several former champions were consulted (John John Molina, Solís, Alfredo Escalera, etc.) with Carlos de León and Miguel Cotto broadening his technical knowledge. Physical trainer César Pellot implemented a regime designed by Marcin Machula. Other changes made for this fight included beginning the camp abroad, traveling to Buffalo, New York with Juan de León (brother of Carlos and co-manager of his career along Willie Silvestrí) and expending four weeks there.

=== WBO light flyweight champion ===
Acosta was initially scheduled to fight Juan Alejo (24–4–1, 14 KOs) for the WBO interim flyweight title on December 2, 2017 but the then reigning champion, Kosei Tanaka, decided to vacate the title one day before the fight. Acosta defeated Alejo by tenth-round knockout in the undercard of Miguel Cotto vs. Sadam Ali on December 2, 2017, to become the WBO light flyweight champion.

Acosta was scheduled to make his first title defense against the one-time WBO and IBF title challenger Carlos Buitrago on June 16, 2018. After some early trouble, losing the first three rounds, Acosta took over the fight from the fourth round onward and won by a twelfth-round technical knockout.

Acosta was scheduled to defend his title for the second time against Abraham Rodríguez on October 13, 2018. He entered the bout as a favorite to retain the belt. Acosta won the fight by a second-round stoppage, knocking Rodríguez out cold with a left hook.

For his third title defense, Acosta was scheduled to fight the former WBC light flyweight champion Ganigan López on March 30, 2019. Acosta won the fight by an eight-round knockout.

Acosta was scheduled to make his fourth title defense against the #15 ranked WBO light flyweight contender Elwin Soto on June 21, 2019. Acosta was the more dominant fighter throughout the bout, and was up 105-103, 106-102 and 107-101 on the scorecards. Acosta was hurt by a left hand late in the twelfth round, after which referee Thomas Taylor abruptly stopped the fight. The stoppage was considered controversial, as Acosta immediately protested the stoppage and didn't seem to be visibly hurt.

=== Move to flyweight ===
Following his title loss, Acosta moved up in weight to flyweight. He was scheduled to fight Raymond Tabugon on October 24, 2019, for the vacant WBO International flyweight title. Acosta won the fight by a fifth-round knockout.

Acost was scheduled to fight Gilberto Mendoza on March 18, 2021. The fight came almost two years after his fight with Raymond Tabugon. Acosta won the fight by unanimous decision, with all three judges scoring the bout 79-72 in his favor.

Acosta was scheduled to fight the reigning WBO flyweight champion Junto Nakatani on May 29, 2021. The fight was later postponed due to COVID-19 regulations and travel restrictions imposed by the Japanese government. Following the postponement, the WBO scheduled a purse bid for June 1, with a minimum offer of $80,000. That purse bid was canceled on June 2, 2021, as an agreement was made that Nakatani’s promoter, Teiken Promotions, would handle the negotiations. The fight was scheduled for September 10, 2021, in Tucson, Arizona. Acosta lost the fight by technical knockout, due to doctor stoppage. He suffered a broken nose in the first round of the bout, which kept worsening until the fight was stopped near the end of the fourth round.

Acosta is scheduled to face countryman Janel Rivera in a ten-round super flyweight bout on May 12, 2022, in the main event of a DAZN broadcast card taking place at the Fantasy Springs Resort Casino in Indio, California. He made quick work of his opponent, stopping Rivera with a flurry of punches after just 79 seconds.

Acosta moved back down to flyweight to face the undefeated Angelino “Huracán” Cordova on April 6, 2023, following an 11-month absence from the sport caused by a left shoulder injury.

Acosta is scheduled to face Ricardo Rafael Sandoval in a 10-round flyweight bout at Toyota Arena in Ontario, CA on July 6, 2024.

== Professional boxing record ==
29 fights	24 wins	5 losses
By knockout	22	3
By decision	2	2

No.	Result	Record	Opponent	Type	Round, time	Date	Location	Notes
29	Loss	24–5	Ricardo Rafael Sandoval	KO	10 (10), 1:23	Jul 6, 2024	Toyota Arena, Ontario, California, U.S.	For vacant WBC Silver flyweight title
28	Win	24–4	Carlos Buitrago	UD	10	Aug 26, 2023	Coliseo Roberto Clemente, San Juan, Puerto Rico	
27	Loss	23–4	Angelino Cordova	UD	10	Apr 6, 2023	Fantasy Springs Resort Casino, Indio, California, U.S.	For vacant WBO International flyweight title
26	Win	23–3	Janiel Rivera	KO	1 (10), 1:19	May 12, 2022	Fantasy Springs Resort Casino, Indio, California, U.S.	
25	Loss	22–3	Junto Nakatani	TKO	4 (12), 2:28	Sep 10, 2021	Casino del Sol, Tucson, Arizona, U.S.	For WBO flyweight title
24	Win	22–2	Gilberto Mendoza	UD	8	Mar 18, 2021	Albergue Olímpico, Salinas, Puerto Rico	
23	Win	21–2	Raymond Tabugon	KO	5 (10), 1:02	Oct 24, 2019	Fantasy Springs Resort and Casino, Indio, California, U.S.	Won vacant WBO International flyweight title
22	Loss	20–2	Elwin Soto	KO	12 (12), 0:22	Jun 21, 2019	Fantasy Springs Resort and Casino, Indio, California, U.S.	Lost WBO light flyweight title
21	Win	20–1	Ganigan López	KO	8 (12). 1:55	Mar 30, 2019	Fantasy Springs Resort and Casino, Indio, California, U.S.	Retained WBO light flyweight title
20	Win	19–1	Abraham Rodríguez	KO	2 (12), 1:02	Oct 13, 2018	Hard Rock Hotel and Casino, Paradise, Nevada, U.S.	Retained WBO light flyweight title
19	Win	18–1	Carlos Buitrago	TKO	12 (12), 1:43	Jun 16, 2018	José Miguel Agrelot Coliseum, San Juan, Puerto Rico	Retained WBO light flyweight title
18	Win	17–1	Juan Alejo	TKO	10 (12), 1:33	Dec 2, 2017	Madison Square Garden, New York City, New York, U.S.	Won vacant WBO light flyweight title
17	Loss	16–1	Kosei Tanaka	UD	12	May 20, 2017	Takeda Teva Ocean Arena, Nagoya, Japan	For WBO light flyweight title
16	Win	16–0	Japhet Uutoni	TKO	10 (12), 1:01	Feb 11, 2017	Roger L. Mendoza Coliseum, Caguas, Puerto Rico	
15	Win	15–0	Luis Ceja	KO	2 (10), 2:48	Nov 12, 2016	Complejo Ferial de Puerto Rico, Ponce, Puerto Rico	Won vacant WBO Latino light flyweight title
14	Win	14–0	Juan Guzmán	KO	1 (8), 1:24	Aug 6, 2016	Cosme Beitia Salamo Coliseum, Cataño, Puerto Rico	
13	Win	13–0	Erickson Martell	KO	2 (8), 2:59	Apr 23, 2016	Roger L. Mendoza Coliseum, Caguas, Puerto Rico	Retained WBC FECARBOX light flyweight title
12	Win	12–0	Felipe Rivas	KO	3 (6), 1:46	Dec 5, 2015	Osceola Heritage Center, Kissimmee, Florida, U.S.	
11	Win	11–0	Luis Almendarez	KO	1 (8), 1:30	Aug 8, 2015	Héctor Solá Bezares Coliseum, Caguas, Puerto Rico	
10	Win	10–0	Armando Vázquez	KO	7 (8), 2:41	Mar 14, 2015	Roger L. Mendoza Coliseum, Caguas, Puerto Rico	Won vacant WBC FECARBOX light flyweight title
9	Win	9–0	Victor Ruiz	RTD	6 (6), 0:40	Nov 15, 2014	Alamodome, San Antonio, Texas, U.S.	
8	Win	8–0	Eduardo Juan	TKO	2 (4), 1:36	Sep 17, 2014	Polideportivo de Sabana Perdida, Santo Domingo, Dominican Republic	
7	Win	7–0	Eduardo Valenzuela	TKO	3 (6), 1:55	Jun 14, 2014	Bally's Atlantic City, Atlantic City, New Jersey, U.S.	
6	Win	6–0	Alexis Díaz	KO	1 (6), 1:29	Feb 1, 2014	Roger L. Mendoza Coliseum, Caguas, Puerto Rico	
5	Win	5–0	Pedro Ortiz	TKO	4 (4), 2:29	Oct 26, 2013	Rafael G. Amalbert Coliseum, Juncos, Puerto Rico	
4	Win	4–0	José Fernández	TKO	1 (6), 1:17	Aug 24, 2013	Pedro Julio Nolasco Coliseum, La Romana, Dominican Republic	
3	Win	3–0	Domingo Berroa	TKO	3 (4), 1:37	Jun 22, 2013	Pedro Julio Nolasco Coliseum, La Romana, Dominican Republic	
2	Win	2–0	Christian López	TKO	2 (4), 1:23	Feb 23, 2013	Cosme Beitia Salamo Coliseum, Cataño, Puerto Rico	
1	Win	1–0	Alexis Díaz	TKO	3 (4), 2:36	Nov 17, 2012	Roger L. Mendoza Coliseum, Caguas, Puerto Rico	

== See also ==
- List of Puerto Rican boxing world champions
- List of light-flyweight boxing champions

Sporting positions
Regional boxing titles
Vacant Title last held by Edwin Diaz	WBC FECARBOX light flyweight champion March 14, 2015 – July 2016; Vacated	Vacant Title next held by Amrit Herrera
Vacant Title last held by Carlos Ruben Dario Ruiz	WBO Latino light flyweight champion November 12, 2016 – May 20, 2017; Lost bid for world title	Vacant Title next held by Agustin Mauro Gauto
Vacant Title last held by Giemel Magramo	WBO International flyweight champion October 24, 2019 – present	Incumbent
World boxing titles
Vacant Title last held by Kosei Tanaka	WBO light flyweight champion December 2, 2017 – June 21, 2019	Succeeded by Elwin Soto
