= Ryuji Hara =

Japanese boxer (born 1990)

Personal information
- Nationality: Japanese
- Born: Ryuji Hara; July 10, 1990 (age 36) Itō, Shizuoka, Japan
- Height: 5 ft 1.5 in (1.56 m)
- Weight: Minimumweight (105 lb); Light flyweight (108 lb)

Boxing career
- Reach: 60.5 in (154 cm)
- Stance: Orthodox

Boxing record
- Total fights: 25
- Wins: 23
- Win by KO: 14
- Losses: 2

Ryuji Hara (原隆二, Hara Ryuji; born 10 July 1990) is a Japanese professional boxer who currently competes in the minimumweight division. He is a former OPBF minimumweight champion.

== Early life ==
Ryuji Hara was born in Itō, Shizuoka on July 10, 1990. He initially wanted to be a jockey, and even passed the strict test. However, after winning the National High School Boxing Championship (his first of four), he decided to focus on boxing. His amateur record was 36-2 (16 KO).

== Professional career ==
Hara made his professional debut in 2010, and won the All-Japan Minimumweight Rookie Tournament in November. After an impressive 12–0 start to his career, Hara received a shot at the vacant Japanese minimumweight title. He defeated veteran fighter Kenichi Horikawa by unanimous decision on October 2, 2012, in Tokyo for the belt.

After three successful defenses, Hara defeated Donny Mabao for the vacant OPBF minimumweight title on March 30, 2014, in Fuji by majority decision.

By this time, he was ranked in the top four by all four major boxing organizations (#2 WBA, #2 WBO, #4 WBC, #5 IBF). Instead of waiting for a world title match, Hara make the risky decision to defend his OPBF belt against up-and-coming fighter Kosei Tanaka on October 30, 2014, in Tokyo. Tanaka won by 10th-round TKO.

After an easy second-round knockout against Thai fighter Petchnamchai Sor Sakulwong, Hara was given a shot at the IBF World minimumweight champion, Katsunari Takayama, on September 27, 2015. During the fight, Takayama suffered a cut above his left eye in round three, but eventually overwhelmed Hara with power shots to the body and head. Referee Wayne Hedgepeth stopped the fight in the eighth round to give Takayama the victory.

== Professional boxing record ==
23 Wins (14 knockouts, 7 decisions), 2 Losses (2 knockouts, 0 decisions), 0 Draws
Res.	Record	Opponent	Type	Rd., Time	Date	Location	Notes
Win	23–2	(Thailand) Seneey Worachina	TKO	2 (8)	2017-10-02	(Japan) Korakuen Hall, Tokyo	
Win	22–2	(Japan) Akiyoshi Kanazawa	TKO	6 (8)	2017-03-27	(Japan) Korakuen Hall, Tokyo	
Win	21–2	(Japan) Hiroya Yamamoto	UD	8	2016-12-30	(Japan) Ariake Coliseum, Tokyo	
Win	20–2	(Japan) Takashi Omae	TKO	3 (8), 0:24	2016-04-10	(Japan) FujisanMesse, Fuji	
Loss	19–2	(Japan) Katsunari Takayama	TKO	8 (12), 1:20	2015-09-27	(Japan) Osaka Prefectural Gymnasium, Osaka	For IBF minimumweight title
Win	19–1	(Thailand) Petchnamchai Sor Sakulwong	KO	2 (8), 1:56	2015-05-31	(Japan) FujisanMesse, Fuji	
Loss	18–1	(Japan) Kosei Tanaka	TKO	10 (12), 0:50	2014-10-30	(Japan) Korakuen Hall, Tokyo	Lost OPBF minimumweight title
Win	18–0	(Indonesia) Faris Nenggo	UD	10	2016-06-23	(Japan) Korakuen Hall, Tokyo	
Win	17–0	(Philippines) Donny Mabao	MD	12	2014-03-30	(Japan) FujisanMesse, Fuji	Won vacant OPBF minimumweight title
Win	16–0	(Japan) Takashi Kunishige	UD	10	2013-10-21	(Japan) Korakuen Hall, Tokyo	Retained Japanese minimumweight title
Win	15–0	(Japan) Shuhei Ito	UD	10	2013-06-02	(Japan) FujisanMesse, Fuji	Retained Japanese minimumweight title
Win	14–0	(Japan) Yuma Iwahashi	UD	10	2013-02-26	(Japan) Korakuen Hall, Tokyo	Retained Japanese minimumweight title
Win	13–0	(Japan) Kenichi Horikawa	UD	10	2012-10-02	(Japan) Korakuen Hall, Tokyo	Won vacant Japanese minimumweight title
Win	12–0	(Thailand) Kaokarat Kaolernlekgym	TKO	6 (8), 2:22	2012-05-05	(Japan) Korakuen Hall, Tokyo	
Win	11–0	(Thailand) Yokthong KKP	KO	2 (8), 0:39	2012-04-01	(Japan) FujisanMesse, Fuji	
Win	10–0	(Indonesia) Louis Loemoli	TKO	2 (8), 2:28	2011-12-31	(Japan) Bunka Gym, Yokohama	
Win	9–0	(Thailand) Athiwatlek Chaiyonggym	TKO	2 (8), 2:52	2011-10-24	(Japan) Korakuen Hall, Tokyo	
Win	8–0	(Japan) Hiroshi Ishii	TKO	6 (8), 1:28	2011-07-11	(Japan) Korakuen Hall, Tokyo	
Win	7–0	(Thailand) Yodchingchai Sithkonnapha	TKO	1 (8), 1:20	2011-04-02	(Japan) Korakuen Hall, Tokyo	
Win	6–0	(Thailand) Nuclear Sor Tanapinyo	TKO	4 (6), 1:28	2011-02-03	(Japan) Korakuen Hall, Tokyo	
Win	5–0	(Japan) Shuhei Ito	TKO	5 (5), 1:40	2010-12-19	(Japan) Korakuen Hall, Tokyo	All-Japan Minimumweight Rookie Tournament final
Win	4–0	(Japan) Ken Agena	UD	4	2010-11-03	(Japan) Korakuen Hall, Tokyo	East Minimumweight Rookie Tournament final
Win	3–0	(Japan) Go Odaira	UD	4	2010-09-28	(Japan) Korakuen Hall, Tokyo	East Minimumweight Rookie Tournament semi-finals
Win	2–0	(Japan) Kenta Kosuge	KO	1 (4), 2:53	2010-07-16	(Japan) Korakuen Hall, Tokyo	East Minimumweight Rookie Tournament quarter-finals
Win	1–0	(Thailand) Wittaya Sithsaithong	KO	1 (4), 2:41	2010-02-05	(Japan) Bunka Gym, Yokohama	
