= Abraham Perez =

American boxer (born 1999)

Personal information
- Born: Abraham Rene Perez; January 5, 1999 (age 27) El Paso, Texas, U.S.
- Height: 5 ft 5 in (165 cm)
- Weight: Flyweight

Boxing career
- Reach: 67 1/2 in (171 cm)
- Stance: Orthodox

Boxing record
- Total fights: 16
- Wins: 16
- Win by KO: 7

Abraham Rene Perez (born January 5, 1999) is an American professional boxer.

== Professional career ==
Perez turned professional in 2021. He compiled a record of 14-0 before facing and defeating Jonathan González in Grand Rapids, Michigan, on June 14, 2026, to win the WBA interim flyweight title. Perez retained the title with a unanimous decision win against Yankiel Rivera in Albuquerque, New Mexico, on November 7, 2026.

== Professional boxing record ==
16 fights	16 wins	0 losses
By knockout	7	0
By decision	9	0

No.	Result	Record	Opponent	Type	Round, time	Date	Location	Notes
16	Win	16–0	Yankiel Rivera	UD	12	Nov 7, 2026	Kiva Auditorium, Albuquerque, New Mexico, U.S.	Retained WBA interim flyweight title
15	Win	15–0	Jonathan González	SD	12	Jun 14, 2026	GLC Live At 20 Monroe, Grand Rapids, Michigan, U.S.	Won WBA interim flyweight title
14	Win	14–0	Esneth Domingo	UD	10	Apr 4, 2026	Embassy Suites, Albuquerque, New Mexico, U.S.	Won vacant IBF Inter-Continental flyweight title
13	Win	13–0	Adrian Yair Ibarra Herrera	RTD	5 (10), 3:00	Dec 12, 2025	Kiva Auditorium, Albuquerque, New Mexico, U.S.	Won vacant NABF flyweight title
12	Win	12–0	Angel Geovanny Meza Morales	UD	8	Jul 12, 2025	El Paso County Coliseum, El Paso, Texas, U.S.	
11	Win	11–0	Jose Rodriguez Montemayor	KO	2 (8), 2:05	Apr 19, 2025	Embassy Suites, Albuquerque, New Mexico, U.S.	
10	Win	10–0	Fernando Díaz	UD	10	Mar 23, 2024	Albuquerque, New Mexico, U.S.	Won vacant WBC Youth Silver flyweight title
9	Win	9–0	Luis Villa Padilla	TKO	9 (12)	Nov 4, 2023	Tingley Coliseum, Albuquerque, New Mexico, U.S.	Won vacant IBA flyweight title
8	Win	8–0	Gilberto Mendoza	TKO	8 (10)	Jul 15, 2023	Manuel Lujan Exhibition Hall At Expo, NM, Albuquerque, New Mexico, U.S.	Retained IBA Intercontinental flyweight title
7	Win	7–0	Jeronil Borres	KO	3 (8)	Apr 8, 2023	Embassy Suites, Albuquerque, New Mexico, U.S.	Won vacant IBA Intercontinental flyweight title
6	Win	6–0	David Vargas Zamora	UD	6	Nov 12, 2022	Inn Of The Mountain Gods, Mescalero, New Mexico, U.S.	
5	Win	5–0	Isaac Anguiano	UD	6	Aug 13, 2022	Lujan Building, Albuquerque, New Mexico, U.S.	
4	Win	4–0	Alejandro Moreno	UD	6	Jun 18, 2022	Ruidoso Downs Race Track, Ruidoso Downs, New Mexico, U.S.	
3	Win	3–0	Mulapi Enjani	UD	6	Apr 22, 2022	South Valley Sports Complex, Albuquerque, New Mexico, U.S.	
2	Win	2–0	Kenneth Jamerson	TKO	1 (4), 1:37	Nov 13, 2021	Coral Arena, Hobbs, New Mexico, U.S.	
1	Win	1–0	Matthew Melton	RTD	1 (4), 3:00	Oct 16, 2021	Kiva Auditorium, Albuquerque, New Mexico, U.S.	

== See also ==
- List of male boxers

Sporting positions
Regional boxing titles
New title	IBA Intercontinental flyweight champion April 8, 2023 – 2023; Vacated	Vacant
Vacant Title last held by Jose Luis Russell Regalado	WBC Youth Silver flyweight champion March 23, 2024 – 2024; Vacated	Vacant Title next held by Yoali Mejia Mosqueda
Vacant Title last held by Rosendo Hugo Guarneros Gonzalez	IBF Inter-Continental flyweight champion April 4, 2026 – June 14, 2026; Won interim title	Vacant
Vacant Title last held by Angel Gonzalez	NABF flyweight champion December 12, 2025 – June 14, 2026; Won interim title	Vacant
Minor world boxing titles
Vacant Title last held by Nico Hernandez	IBA flyweight champion November 4, 2023 – 2023; Vacated	Vacant
Major world boxing titles
Preceded by Jonathan González	WBA flyweight champion Interim title June 14, 2026 – present	Incumbent
