= Yankiel Rivera =

Puerto Rican boxer (born 1997)

Personal information
- Nationality: Puerto Rican
- Born: Yankiel Rivera Figueroa; September 10, 1997 (age 29) Toa Alta, Puerto Rico
- Weight: Flyweight

Boxing career

Boxing record
- Total fights: 11
- Wins: 8
- Win by KO: 4
- Losses: 2
- Draws: 1
Medal record
Men's amateur boxing
Representing Puerto Rico
Pan American Games
Bronze medal – third place	2019 Lima	Flyweight
Central American and Caribbean Games
Bronze medal – third place	2018 Barranquilla	Flyweight

Yankiel Rivera Figueroa (born September 10, 1997) is a Puerto Rican professional boxer. He is the only boxer in his country who qualified to participate in the 2020 Summer Olympics.

== Amateur career ==
Rivera won bronze at the Pan American Youth Championships in Quito in 2014. He lost to Leandro Blanc in the quarter-finals of the 2016 continental Olympic qualification in Buenos Aires and competed at the 2017 World Boxing Championships in Hamburg, where he lost to the eventual runner-up Jasurbek Latipov in the preliminary round. At the 2018 Central American and Caribbean Games in Barranquilla and also at the 2019 Pan American Games in Lima, he won a bronze medal in the flyweight division.

Due to the COVID-19 pandemic, the American-continental Olympic qualification tournament in Buenos Aires planned for May 2021 was canceled and a qualification based on the continental ranking was decided instead, which secured Rivera a starting place as number 3 in the ranking.

== Professional career ==
Yankiel Rivera was scheduled to face Angel Gonzalez in San Juan, Puerto Rico on December 7, 2024. Rivera won the fight by TKO in the fourth round.

=== WBA interim flyweight championship ===
Rivera faced Angelino Cordova for the WBA interim flyweight title at the Caribe Royale in Orlando, Florida, on August 23, 2025. The fight ended in a majority draw.

He got a second chance at the still vacant WBA interim flyweight title against Jonathan González at Coliseo Roberto Clemente in San Juan, Puerto Rico, on January 3, 2026. Rivera lost by unanimous decision.

On November 7, 2026, Rivera failed in a third attempt to win the WBA interim flyweight title, losing to defending champion Abraham Perez on a unanimous decision at Kiva Auditorium in Albuquerque, New Mexico.

== Professional boxing record ==
11 fights	8 wins	2 losses
By knockout	4	0
By decision	4	2
Draws	1	

No.	Result	Record	Opponent	Type	Round, time	Date	Location	Notes
11	Loss	8–2–1	Abraham Perez	UD	12	Nov 7, 2026	Kiva Auditorium, Albuquerque, New Mexico, U.S.	For WBA interim flyweight title
10	Win	8–1–1	Francisco Vargas Martinez	TKO	1 (6) 2:23	Sep 11, 2026	Coliseo Carlos 'Teo' Cruz, Santo Domingo, Dominican Republic	
9	Loss	7–1–1	Jonathan González	UD	12	Jan 3, 2026	Coliseo Roberto Clemente, San Juan, Puerto Rico	For WBA interim flyweight title
8	Draw	7–0–1	Angelino Cordova	MD	12	Aug 23, 2025	Caribe Royale Orlando, Orlando, Florida, U.S.	For WBA interim flyweight title
7	Win	7–0	Angel Gonzalez Jr.	TKO	4 (10) 2:14	Dec 7, 2024	Coliseo Roberto Clemente, San Juan, Puerto Rico	Retained WBO Inter-Continental flyweight title. Won vacant WBC Silver flyweight title
6	Win	6–0	Victor Efrain Sandoval	UD	10	Jun 15, 2024	Coliseo Juan Aubin Cruz Abreu, Manati, Puerto Rico	Retained WBC Continental Americas flyweight title. Won vacant WBO Inter-Continental flyweight title
5	Win	5–0	Andy Dominguez Velasquez	UD	10	Feb 24, 2024	Caribe Royale Orlando, Orlando, Florida, U.S.	Won vacant WBC Continental Americas flyweight title
4	Win	4–0	Christian Robles	UD	8	Jun 24, 2023	Hulu Theater, New York City, New York, U.S.	
3	Win	3–0	Fernando Diaz	UD	8	Feb 4, 2023	Hulu Theater, New York City, New York, U.S.	
2	Win	2–0	Ramon Velasquez	KO	3 (6) 0:25	Nov 19, 2022	Cancha Ruben Zayas Montanez, Trujillo Alto, Puerto Rico	
1	Win	1–0	Jose Antonio Jimenez	KO	1 (6) 1:01	Sep 24, 2022	Coliseo Elias Chegwin, Barranquilla, Colombia	
