= Kosei Tanaka =

Japanese boxer

Kosei Tanaka 田中恒成
Personal information
- Nickname: Chukyo no Kaibutsu (中京の怪物) "Monster of Chukyo": Dream Boy
- Born: 15 June 1995 (age 31) Tajimi, Japan
- Height: 5 ft 4 1/2 in (164 cm)
- Weight: Mini flyweight; Light flyweight; Flyweight; Super flyweight

Boxing career
- Reach: 64 1/2 in (164 cm)
- Stance: Orthodox

Boxing record
- Total fights: 22
- Wins: 20
- Win by KO: 11
- Losses: 2
Medal record
Men's Boxing
Representing Japan
Asian Youth Championships
Silver medal – second place	2013 Subic Bay	Light flyweight

Kosei Tanaka (田中 恒成, Tanaka Kōsei; born 15 June 1995) is a Japanese former professional boxer who competed from 2013 to 2024. He is a four-weight world champion, having held the World Boxing Organization (WBO) mini-flyweight title from 2015 to 2016; the WBO junior-flyweight title from 2016 to 2017; the WBO flyweight title from 2018 to 2020; and the WBO junior-bantamweight title in 2024. Upon winning his first world title in only his fifth bout, he became the fastest Japanese fighter ever to become a world champion. Along with Vasiliy Lomachenko, he is also the fastest ever male fighter to win titles in three weight-classes, having accomplished the feat in only 12 bouts. He also surpassed Oscar De La Hoya to become the fastest male four division champion, setting the bar at 21 fights.

== Amateur career ==
As a child, Tanaka suffered from Legg–Calvé–Perthe disease. Despite this, he took up boxing and won four national high school tournaments competing as an amateur in the junior-flyweight division. At the continental and international level he was a quarter-finalist at the 2012 Youth World Championships and a silver medalist at the 2013 ASBC Asian Confederation Youth Boxing Championships. At Chukyo Highschool he trained under former OPBF super flyweight champion Hideyasu Ishihara. He finished his amateur career with a record of 46-5 (13 KO/RSC). He was not stopped during his amateur career.

== Professional career ==
=== Mini-flyweight ===
Tanaka turned pro at the age of 18 in 2013. In November 2014, Tanaka defeated previously unbeaten Ryuji Hara via tenth-round technical knockout (TKO) to win the OPBF mini-flyweight title. In his next fight, Tanaka decisioned Julian Yedras (117–111, 117–111, 115–113) to win the WBO mini-flyweight title. Tanaka holds the Japanese record for winning a world title in the fewest fights (five), surpassing the previous record held by Naoya Inoue of six fights. Tanaka's only title defense at mini-flyweight came against Vic Saludar, whom he knocked out in round six after a left hook to the body. Saludar knocked down Tanaka in round six, and was ahead on all scorecards prior to the stoppage.

=== Junior-flyweight ===
In December 2016, Tanaka challenged former mini-flyweight title holder Moisés Fuentes for the WBO junior-flyweight title. Tanaka dominated Fuentes, dropping him in round five before referee Raul Caiz Jr stopped the fight, giving Tanaka a TKO victory. With the win, Tanaka became a two-weight world champion in just eight fights. Tanaka's first defense came against prospect Ángel Acosta. The former won a wide unanimous decision (UD) (117–110, 117–110, 116–111) and dropped Acosta once. Acosta had won all 16 of his previous fights by knockout.

Tanaka's second defense took place in September 2017 against little-known fighter Palangpol CP Freshmart. Tanaka was a huge favorite going into the fight, but Palangpol would prove to be Tanaka's toughest challenger so far, dropping the defending champion once in the first round and trading back-and-forth combinations for the rest of the bout. After a thrilling fight, Tanaka would finally gain the upper hand in round nine, as he knocked down Palangpol and continued to land big combinations as the challenger struggled to connect. Eventually, the referee stepped in and stopped the fight at 1:52 in round nine.

Tanaka had previously sought a unification bout against WBA titleholder Ryoichi Taguchi in December, but injuries during the fight against Palangpol would prevent him from fighting on that date.

=== Flyweight ===
In December 2017, Tanaka vacated his junior-flyweight title to move to the flyweight division. In September 2018, Tanaka defeated Sho Kimura to capture the WBO flyweight title, equalling Vasyl Lomachenko's record of becoming a three-weight world champion in just 12 fights.

In March 2019, Tanaka fought former WBA, IBF, lineal and The Ring junior flyweight champion and domestic rival Ryoichi Taguchi for the first defense of his WBO flyweight title in a one sided bout described as "action packed" by spectators. After the fight, Tanaka expressed regret that he did not deliver a knockout.

In August 2019, Tanaka fought Jonathan González after losing on all three judge's scorecards leading up to the seventh round, Tanaka delivered a brutal knock out to make a second successful defense of his WBO flyweight title.

On New Year's Eve in 2019, Tanaka fought Wulan Tuolehazi, Tanaka delivered a brutal third-round knockout after a one sided fight to defend his WBO flyweight title for the third time. Shortly after the bout, he vacated his WBO flyweight title, announcing that he intended to fight Kazuto Ioka for his WBO super flyweight title.

=== Super-flyweight ===
Tanaka faced WBO super flyweight champion Kazuto Ioka on New Year's Eve 2020 in an attempt to win a major title in four divisions in the fewest fights. He would have become the second Japanese champion to win a major title in four divisions if he was victorious, the first being his opponent, Ioka. After a competitive first four rounds in which Tanaka was the aggressor and Ioka found success with counter punches, Ioka dropped his opponent in the fifth round with a counter left hook. With about a minute left in the sixth round, he again knocked Tanaka down. In the eighth round, Ioka caught his opponent with another hard counter left hook, and referee Michiaki Someya caught Tanaka before he could fall and waved off the fight, with Ioka inflicting Tanaka with his first professional loss and retaining his WBO title via eighth-round technical knockout.

Tanaka was booked to face the one-time WBA super-flyweight title challenger Sho Ishida on 11 December 2021, at the International Conference Hall in Nagoya, Japan. He won the fight by split decision, with two judges awarding him a 96-94 and 96-95 scorecard respectively, while the third judge scored the fight 96-94 for Ishida.

Tanaka faced the reigning OPBF and WBO Asia Pacific super flyweight champion Masayoshi Hashizume, for the latter title, at the Korakuen Hall in Tokyo, Japan on 29 June 2022. The fight headlined the "89th Phoenix Battle" and was broadcast by Hikari TV. Tanaka won the fight by a fifth-round technical knockout. Tanaka vacated the WBO Asia Pacific title on 23 August 2022.

Tanaka then faced Yanga Sigqibo on 11 December 2022, at the Takeda Teva Ocean Arena in Nagoya, Japan. He won the bout by unanimous decision.

Tanaka was originally scheduled to make the first defense of his WBO super flyweight title against Jonathan Rodriguez at Ryōgoku Kokugikan in Tokyo, Japan on July 20, 2024. However, this fight was called off the day before it was due after Rodriguez missed weight by nearly seven pounds.

Tanaka made his first defense against South African Phumelele Cafu on October 14, 2024. The fight was held at Ariake Arena in Tokyo. He lost the bout by split decision.

=== Retirement ===
Tanaka announced his retirement from professional boxing in June 2025 citing repeated eye injuries. According to Tanaka despite multiple surgeries the vision in his right eye is still "severely distorted" and he is unable to focus with both eyes. In November 2025, he discussed retirement with Ring Magazine. He continued to stay active, participating in public speaking, organizing boxing events, and providing commentary. He aimed to open a boxing gym in 2026, with a long-term goal of establishing 100 gyms. In the interview, he expressed some disappointment about not achieving the status of a five-weight or unified world champion in his career.

== Personal life ==
Tanaka balanced professional boxing with school and in 2019 graduated with a degree in economics from Chukyo University. He is the cousin of Japanese figure skater Yuhana Yokoi and younger brother of amateur fighter Ryomei Tanaka. He said that he admires Naoya Inoue in an interview with The Japan Times.

== Professional boxing record ==
22 fights	20 wins	2 losses
By knockout	11	1
By decision	9	1

No.	Result	Record	Opponent	Type	Round, time	Date	Location	Notes
22	Loss	20–2	Phumelele Cafu	SD	12	14 Oct 2024	Ariake Arena, Tokyo, Japan	Lost WBO junior-bantamweight title
21	Win	20–1	Christian Bacasegua	UD	12	24 Feb 2024	Ryōgoku Kokugikan, Tokyo, Japan	Won vacant WBO junior-bantamweight title
20	Win	19–1	Pablo Carrillo	TKO	10 (10), 2:43	21 May 2023	Paloma Mizuho Arena, Nagoya, Japan	
19	Win	18–1	Yanga Sigqibo	UD	10	11 Dec 2022	Takeda Teva Ocean Arena, Nagoya, Japan	
18	Win	17–1	Masayoshi Hashizume	TKO	5 (12), 2:52	29 Jun 2022	Korakuen Hall, Tokyo, Japan	Won WBO Asia Pacific junior-bantamweight title
17	Win	16–1	Sho Ishida	SD	10	11 Dec 2021	International Conference Hall, Nagoya, Japan	
16	Loss	15–1	Kazuto Ioka	TKO	8 (12), 1:35	31 Dec 2020	Ota City General Gymnasium, Tokyo, Japan	For WBO junior-bantamweight title
15	Win	15–0	Wulan Tuolehazi	KO	3 (12), 2:29	31 Dec 2019	Ota City General Gymnasium, Tokyo, Japan	Retained WBO flyweight title
14	Win	14–0	Jonathan González	TKO	7 (12), 2:49	24 Aug 2019	Takeda Teva Ocean Arena, Nagoya, Japan	Retained WBO flyweight title
13	Win	13–0	Ryoichi Taguchi	UD	12	16 Mar 2019	Memorial Center, Gifu, Japan	Retained WBO flyweight title
12	Win	12–0	Sho Kimura	MD	12	24 Sep 2018	Takeda Teva Ocean Arena, Nagoya, Japan	Won WBO flyweight title
12	Win	11–0	Ronnie Baldonado	TKO	9 (10), 2:26	31 Mar 2018	International Conference Hall, Nagoya, Japan	
10	Win	10–0	Palangpol CP Freshmart	TKO	9 (12), 1:29	13 Sep 2017	Edion Arena, Osaka, Japan	Retained WBO junior-flyweight title
9	Win	9–0	Ángel Acosta	UD	12	20 May 2017	Takeda Teva Ocean Arena, Nagoya, Japan	Retained WBO junior-flyweight title
8	Win	8–0	Moisés Fuentes	TKO	5 (12), 1:52	31 Dec 2016	Memorial Center, Gifu, Japan	Won vacant WBO junior-flyweight title
7	Win	7–0	Rene Patilano	KO	6 (10), 2:23	28 May 2016	International Conference Hall, Nagoya, Japan	
6	Win	6–0	Vic Saludar	KO	6 (12), 2:15	31 Dec 2015	Aichi Prefectural Gymnasium, Nagoya, Japan	Retained WBO mini-flyweight title
5	Win	5–0	Julian Yedras	UD	12	30 May 2015	Park Arena Komaki, Komaki, Japan	Won vacant WBO mini-flyweight title
4	Win	4–0	Ryuji Hara	TKO	10 (12), 0:50	30 Oct 2014	Korakuen Hall, Tokyo, Japan	Won OPBF mini-flyweight title
3	Win	3–0	Crison Omayao	KO	1 (10), 1:55	20 Jul 2014	International Conference Hall, Nagoya, Japan	
2	Win	2–0	Ronelle Ferreras	UD	8	16 Mar 2014	International Conference Hall, Nagoya, Japan	
1	Win	1–0	Oscar Raknafa	UD	6	10 Nov 2013	International Conference Hall, Nagoya, Japan	

== Titles in boxing ==
=== Major world titles ===
- WBO mini-flyweight champion (105 lbs)
- WBO junior-flyweight champion (108 lbs)
- WBO flyweight champion (112 lbs)
- WBO junior-bantamweight champion (115 lbs)

=== Regional/International titles ===
- OPBF mini-flyweight champion (105 lbs)
- WBO Asia Pacific junior-bantamweight champion (115 lbs)

=== Honorary titles ===
- WBO Super Champion

== See also ==
- List of male boxers
- Boxing in Japan
- List of Japanese boxing world champions
- List of world mini-flyweight boxing champions
- List of world light-flyweight boxing champions
- List of world flyweight boxing champions
- List of world super-flyweight boxing champions
- List of boxing quadruple champions

Sporting positions
Regional boxing titles
Preceded by Ryuji Hara	OPBF mini-flyweight champion 30 October 2014 – 30 May 2015; Won WBO world title	Vacant Title next held by Xiong Chaozhong
Preceded by Masayoshi Hashizume	WBO Asia Pacific super-flyweight champion 29 June 2022 – 2022; Vacated	Vacant Title next held by Tsubasa Murachi
World boxing titles
Vacant Title last held by Katsunari Takayama	WBO mini-flyweight champion 30 May 2015 – 7 April 2016; Vacated	Vacant Title next held by Katsunari Takayama
Vacant Title last held by Donnie Nietes	WBO light-flyweight champion 31 December 2016 – 30 November 2017; Vacated	Vacant Title next held by Ángel Acosta
Preceded by Sho Kimura	WBO flyweight champion 24 September 2018 – 31 January 2020; Vacated	Vacant Title next held by Junto Nakatani
Vacant Title last held by Junto Nakatani	WBO super-flyweight champion 24 February – 14 October 2024	Succeeded by Phumelele Cafu
Records
Preceded by Naoya Inoue; 6 fights	Fastest Japanese fighter to win a world title 5 fights 30 May 2015 – present	Incumbent
Preceded by Vasyl Lomachenko tied on 12 fights	Fewest professional fights to win a major world title in three weight classes 24 September 2018 – present	Incumbent
