= Rodrigo Marte =

Dominican Republic boxer (born 1997)

Personal information
- Nationality: Dominican
- Born: 3 August 1997 (age 28) Hato Mayor del Rey, Dominican Republic

Sport
- Sport: Boxing
Medal record
Representing Dominican Republic
Pan American Games
Gold medal – first place	2019 Lima	Flyweight
Bolivarian Games
Bronze medal – third place	2022 Valledupar	Flyweight

Rodrigo Marte de la Rosa (born 3 August 1997) is a Dominican Republic boxer. He competed in the men's flyweight event at the 2020 Summer Olympics.

Olympic Games
Preceded by Luguelín Santos	Flag bearer for Dominican Republic; Tokyo 2020 with Prisilla Rivera	Succeeded by Audrys Nin Reyes; Marileidy Paulino
