= Juan Alejo =

Mexican boxer (born 1984)

Personal information
- Nickname: Pinky
- Born: 9 January 1984 (age 42) Guadalupe, Nuevo León, Mexico
- Weight: Light flyweight

Boxing career
- Stance: Orthodox

Boxing record
- Total fights: 36
- Wins: 25
- Win by KO: 14
- Losses: 10
- Draws: 1
- No contests: 0

Juan Alejo (born 9 January 1984) is a Mexican professional boxer. He challenged for the WBO light flyweight title in 2015 and 2017.

== Professional career ==
Alejo won Mexico's Light Flyweight title with an 11th-round TKO of Jose Guadalupe Martinez on 20 August 2014. He won a ten-round split decision victory over Jose Rivas on 27 May 2015.

On 10 October 2015, he fought the WBO Light Flyweight Champion Donnie Nietes for the title being the contender, Alejo was the WBO #2 Light Flyweight fighter. In the main event at StubHub Center in Carson, California, Nietes, (37–1–4, 21 KOs) beat Alejo, (21–3, 13 KOs), over twelve rounds in a unanimous decision. Scores were 119–109, 119–109, 120–108.

On 2 December 2017, he fought the Puerto Rican Boxer Ángel Acosta for a vacant WBO World Light flyweight title, where he got knocked out at tenth round of the fight. It was one of the attractions of the main even fight of Miguel Cotto vs Sadam Ali, were Miguel Cotto lost by Unanimous Decision.

== Professional Record ==
24 wins (14 knockouts), 5 defeats, 1 draw
No.	Res.	Record	Opponent	Type	Round Time	Date	Location	
30	Loss	24–5–1	(Puerto Rico) Ángel Acosta	TKO	10 (12) 1:33	2 Dec 2017	(United States) Madison Square Garden, New York City, New York, U.S.	For vacant WBO light flyweight title
29	Draw	24–4–1	(Mexico) Luis Javier Cerrito	SD	12	2017-09-12	Arena El Jefe, Monterrey, Mexico	Retained WBC FECOMBOX light flyweight title
28	Win	24–4	(Mexico) Genaro Rios	TKO	2 (12) 2:45	2017-03-14	Arena El Jefe, Monterrey, Mexico	Retained WBC FECOMBOX light flyweight title
27	Win	23–4	(Mexico) Gabriel Ramirez Anaya	UD	12	2016-08-30	Centro de Espectaculos El Jefe, Monterrey, Mexico	Retained WBC FECOMBOX light flyweight title
26	Win	22–4	(Mexico) Luis Manuel Macias	UD	12	2016-05-17	Centro de Espectaculos El Jefe, Monterrey, Mexico	Won WBC FECOMBOX light flyweight title
25	Win	21–4	(Mexico) Ivan Rodriguez	KO	10	2016-01-26	Arena El Jefe, Monterrey, Mexico	
24	Loss	20–4	(Philippines) Donnie Nietes	UD	12	2015-10-17	(United States) StubHub Center, Carson, California, U.S.	For World Boxing Organization and The Ring light flyweight titles
23	Win	20–3	(Mexico) Jose Rivas	SD	10	2015-05-27	Arena El Jefe, Monterrey, Mexico	
22	Win	19–3	(Mexico) Jesus Faro	UD	12	2015-02-18	Arena El Jefe, Monterrey, Mexico	Retained Mexico light flyweight title
21	Win	18–3	(Mexico) Elfego Sierra	UD	10	2014-12-03	Arena El Jefe, Monterrey, Mexico	
20	Win	17–3	(Mexico) Jose Guadalupe Martinez	TKO	11 (12) 1:00	2014-08-20	Arena El Jefe, Monterrey, Mexico	Won vacant Mexico light flyweight title
19	Win	16–3	(Mexico) Eduardo Cruz Munoz	TKO	1 (10) 2:07	2014-05-21	Arena El Jefe, Monterrey, Mexico	
18	Win	15–3	(Mexico) Alberto Arias	TKO	9 (10) 0:50	2014-04-09	Centro de Espectaculos El Jefe, Monterrey, Mexico	
17	Win	14–3	(Mexico) Miguel Aleman	TKO	4 (10) 0:53	2014-02-12	Centro de Espectaculos El Jefe, Monterrey, Mexico	
16	Win	13–3	(Mexico) Job Solano	TKO	10 (10) 1:00	2013-12-06	Arena Coliseo, Monterrey, Mexico	
15	Win	12–3	(Mexico) Erik Ramirez	TKO	2 (10) 0:31	2013-08-09	Monterrey, Mexico	
14	Win	11–3	(Mexico) Josue Vega	KO	5 (10) 1:50	2013-09-20	Arena Coliseo, Monterrey, Mexico	
13	Win	10–3	(Mexico) Leiver Perez	UD	10	2013-06-14	Arena Coliseo, Monterrey, Mexico	
12	Win	9–3	(Mexico) Sammy Reyes	TKO	6 (10) 2:05	2013-04-12	Arena Coliseo, Monterrey, Mexico	
11	Win	8–3	(Mexico) Arturo Castro Vazquez	UD	8	2013-02-22	Arena Coliseo, Monterrey, Mexico	
10	Win	7–3	(Mexico) Reynaldo Avila	KO	1 (8) 1:00	2012-12-07	Auditorio Municipal Milo Martínez de la Rosa, Monclova, Mexico	
9	Win	6–3	(Mexico) Jesus Machorro	SD	8	2012-08-03	Matehuala, Mexico	
8	Win	5–3	(Mexico) Juan de Dios Castro	UD	8	2012-03-28	Arena El Jefe, Monterrey, Mexico	
7	Win	4–3	(Mexico) Arturo Infante	KO	4 (8) 1:48	2011-10-21	Plaza de Toros, Matehuala, Mexico	
6	Win	3–3	(Mexico) Juan de Dios Castro	KO	6 (8) 0:45	2011-09-09	Plaza de Toros, Matehuala, Mexico	
5	Win	2–3	(Mexico) Juan de Dios Castro	SD	6	2011-04-15	Salón de la Sección 288, Monclova, Mexico	
4	Win	1–3	(Mexico) Zenon Penaflor	KO	1 (6) 1:38	2010-09-24	Gimnasio Municipal, Saltillo, Mexico	
3	Loss	0–3	(Mexico) Jesus Limones	KO	4 (6) 2:33	2009-12-12	Plaza de Toros Rea, Mazatlán, Mexico	
2	Loss	0–2	(Mexico) Jose Cabrera	UD	4 (4)	2009-09-12	Arena Monterrey, Monterrey, Mexico	
1	Loss	0–1	(Mexico) Jesus Limones	KO	3 (4) 2:20	2009-04-18	Plaza de Toros, Nuevo Laredo, Mexico	
TKO - Technical Knockout, KO - Knockout, TD - Technical Decision, RTD - Referee Technical Decision, SD - Split Decision, UD - Unanimous Decision, D - Draw
