= Carmen de Apicalá =

Coordinates: 4°09′N 74°44′W

Carmen de Apicalá Carmelitano
- Municipality and town
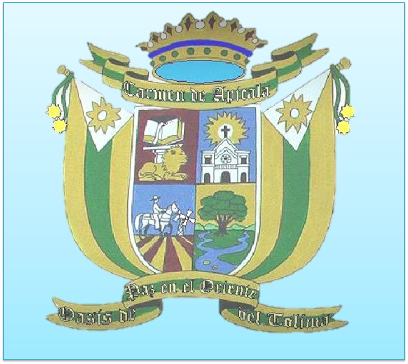
- Flag Coat of arms

- Location of the municipality and town of Carmen Apicala in the Tolima Department of Colombia.
- Country: Colombia
- Department: Tolima

Government
  - Mayor: Luis Ángel Ortiz

Area
  - Total: 183 km^{2} (71 sq mi)
- Elevation: 328 m (1,076 ft)

Population (2017)
  - Total: 8,880
  - Density: 48.5/km^{2} (126/sq mi)
- Time zone: UTC-5 (Colombia Standard Time)

Carmen de Apicalá is a town and municipality in the Tolima Department of Colombia.
