= Interim championship =

An interim championship is an alternate title that is awarded by the sanctioning bodies of professional boxing and in other combat sports, such as kickboxing, professional wrestling, and mixed martial arts. Occasionally, the champion of a particular weight class is temporarily unable to defend their championship because of medical, legal, or other reasons beyond the competitor's control. When this case occurs, two highly ranked contenders may fight for an interim championship of the same weight division, leading to two champions existing in the same weight division simultaneously. Once the original champion can return, at the discretion of the sanctioning body or promotion concerned, they must defend their title against the interim champion, who will relinquish their interim title to fight for the full world title. If the original champion is defeated, cannot return, refuses to defend their title, or transfers to a different weight division, the interim champion is promoted to full championship status.

In professional wrestling, due to the sport's entertainment and scripted nature, an interim championship is rarely used. If the champion is injured or if other reasons occur beyond the wrestler's control, they will usually be stripped of the title, and a new champion will be determined. One example of an interim champion in WWE was on the company's NXT brand, where Jordan Devlin (the NXT Cruiserweight Champion) could not travel to the United States to defend the title due to COVID-19 pandemic-related travel restrictions, rendering him only able to defend the title on NXT's UK brand at the time. In the United States, an interim Cruiserweight Championship was created and won in a tournament by Santos Escobar. Once travel restrictions eased up, Devlin and Escobar fought in a championship unification match at NXT TakeOver: Stand & Deliver to determine the sole champion, which Escobar won. All Elite Wrestling (AEW) utilized the concept of interim championships for a time by crowning the winners of Jon Moxley vs. Hiroshi Tanahashi for the interim AEW World Championship, Toni Storm vs. Britt Baker vs. Jamie Hayter vs. Hikaru Shida for the interim AEW Women's World Championship, and Sammy Guevara vs. Dustin Rhodes for the interim AEW TNT Championship. The concept returned for their sister promotion Ring of Honor (ROH) in 2025, when Mina Shirakawa was crowned the interim ROH Women's World Television Champion at Supercard of Honor due to lineal champion Red Velvet being injured.

== Interim champions ==
As of November 4, 2026

Professional boxing
Sanctioning body	Weight Class	Champion
WBA	Light Heavyweight	Albert Ramírez
WBA	Super Lightweight	Khariton Agrba
WBA	Super Bantamweight	Gary Antonio Russell
WBA	Flyweight	Abraham Perez
WBC	Super Middleweight	Lester Martínez
WBC	Middleweight	Jesus Ramos
WBC	Super Welterweight	Vergil Ortiz Jr.
WBC	Super Lightweight	Isaac Cruz
WBC	Lightweight	Jadier Herrera
WBC	Super Featherweight	Ryan Garner
WBC	Flyweight	Galal Yafai
IBF	Super Bantamweight	Sam Goodman
WBO	Light Heavyweight	Callum Smith

Mixed martial arts
Promotion	Weight Class	Champion
Eagle Fighting Championship	Featherweight	Rasul Magomedov
Konfrontacja Sztuk Walki	Middleweight	Piotr Kuberski

== See also ==
- List of current champions in All Elite Wrestling
- List of current champions in WWE
- List of current female world boxing champions
- List of current mixed martial arts champions
- List of current world boxing champions
