= Miel Fajardo =

Filipino boxer (born 2000)

- Fajardo in 2026

Personal information
- Nickname: Silent Assassin
- Nationality: Filipino
- Born: Miel Balinton Fajardo; January 1, 2000 (age 26) San Francisco, Agusan del Sur, Philippines
- Height: 1.63 m (5 ft 4 in)
- Weight: Junior Flyweight; Flyweight

Boxing career
- Reach: 165 cm (65 in)
- Stance: Orthodox

Boxing record
- Total fights: 19
- Wins: 14
- Win by KO: 12
- Losses: 3
- Draws: 2

Miel Balinton Fajardo (born 1 January 2000) is a Filipino professional boxer who held the OPBF light flyweight title from August 2023 to April 2024.

== Professional career ==
=== Light flyweight ===
==== Early years ====
Miel Fajardo made his professional debut on November 5, 2016, earning a draw against fellow debutant Gringo Navarro.

On August 26, 2018, Miel Fajardo fought ArAr Andales after winning against Joel Ramos via TKO, whereas Andales won controversially. Fajardo won his next bout against Rico Saonoy via TKO in the 3rd Round.

=== Flyweight ===
Miel Fajardo moved up to flyweight after beating out Saonoy, and made his flyweight debut against undefeated Chinese, Xiang Li at Qingdao, China, whereas Xiang Li lost via Majority decision.

After beating Xiang Li, Fajardo fought Filipino Martin Cordova where he won and won against 2 more Chinese at China.

==== Fajardo vs. Gauto ====
After beating Fernan Agencia and tying with Bienvenido Ligas, Fajardo sets his eyes on undefeated Argentinian boxer Agustin Mauro Gauto. In the last 10 seconds of the 1st Round, Gauto went down via left hand, In the 2nd Round Gauto went down 2 times and manages to stand up again until the referee decides to step in and called stop the bout.

==== Fajardo vs. Jiamthong ====
On December 28, 2022, Miel Fajardo fought Thai boxer Sarawut Jiamthong for the Asian Boxing Federation flyweight title. Fajardo earned a 10-seconds KO win and some even said 7-seconds win. Many considered this Match as the Fastest Knockout in Professional boxing.

=== Return to light flyweight ===
==== Cancelled bout against Nhlanhla Tyirha ====
On May 29, 2023, it was reported that Miel Fajardo would fight South African prospect Nhlanhla Tyirha casting as the Co-main event of the Sivenathi Nontshinga vs Regie Suganob bout. Suddenly on June 28, 2023, Miel Fajardo pulled out as Weekend tournament looms. Whereas Fajardo was replaced by George Kandulo, a Malawian boxer.

==== Fajardo vs. Gabunilas ====
On July 15, 2023, it was reported that Miel Fajardo would face fellow Filipino prospect, "Angas ng Cebu" ("Arrogant of Cebu") John Paul Gabunilas on August 15, 2023, at Hoops Dome for the vacant OPBF light flyweight title. The match began, and within just a few seconds, Gabunilas was already downed, after that, Gabunilas stood up but was wobbly, not long after, Gabunilas got knocked down again, Once again, Gabunilas stood up, but he was dropped for the third time, this time, the Referee stopped the bout, making Fajardo win the vacant OPBF light flyweight title, this also serves him, his 3rd KO/TKO win within the First Round in a row.

==== Fajardo vs. Simsri ====
On January 2, 2024, Fajardo hinted a picture of a Thai boxer's record on BoxRec, showing an intimidating 32–1 record and rated best active Thai light flyweight boxer by BoxRec prior to the time, on his Facebook "Story", by depending on the hinted stats, Thanongsak Simsri completes all the requirements. On the next day, the bout has been confirmed by News article writer Carlos Costa, the article also states that Fajardo will be defending his OPBF light flyweight title and the event will be held at the Land of the Rising Star, Japan (at Osaka) on April 13, 2024, and on February 3, 2024, a news article featuring the bout from The Ring is released. Miel Fajardo was undoubtedly outclassed by the more experienced and technical Simsri, although Fajardo knocked Simsri down in the tenth round, it was not enough, Simsri survived the challenge en route to Simsri becoming the new OPBF light flyweight champion via unanimous decision.

==== Thrilla in Manila II Countdown ====
On October 26, 2025, in an early boxing event dedicated as the 50th Year Anniversary of the historic Thrilla in Manila between Muhammad Ali and Joe Frazier. Co-featured bout, Fajardo will face compatriot contender Esneth Domingo for the vacant IBF Pan Pacific Flyweight title in a ten-round bout at the San Andres Sports Complex in Manila. Fajardo won via UD, recording his first decision victory in seven years.

==== Fajardo vs. Reyes ====
In March 2026, it was announced that Fajardo was set in an IBF flyweight title eliminator against Argentine contender and number 3-rated Jeremias Reyes in Gálvez, Santa Fe, Argentina on April 11, 2026. Previously, Reyes also fought in an IBF flyweight title eliminator against Felix Alvarado in December 2024, however he lost via MD. Fajardo would knock Reyes down four times within 65 seconds before the referee halted the bout in the first round in 1:05. Fajardo would stun the hometown crowd and will be the mandatory challenger for the IBF world flyweight title.

== Professional boxing record ==
| 19 fights | 14 wins | 3 losses |
|---|---|---|
| By knockout | 12 | 0 |
| By decision | 2 | 3 |
| Draws | 2 | |

| No. | Result | Record | Opponent | Type | Round, Time | Date | Location | Notes |
|---|---|---|---|---|---|---|---|---|
| 19 | Win | 14–3–2 | Tobias Jeremias Reyes | TKO | 1 (12), 1:05 | Apr 11, 2026 | Club Atlético Santa Paula, Gálvez, Argentina | |
| 18 | Win | 13–3–2 | Esneth Domingo | UD | 10 | Oct 26, 2025 | San Andres Sports Complex, Manila, Philippines | Won vacant IBF Pan Pacific flyweight title |
| 17 | Win | 12–3–2 | Miller Alapormina | KO | 1 (8), 0:22 | Aug 24, 2025 | The Grand Flash Ballroom of the Elorde Sports Complex, Parañaque, Philippines | |
| 16 | Loss | 11–3–2 | Mchanja Yohana | UD | 12 | Dec 26, 2024 | Super Dome Arena, Dar-Es-Salaam, Tanzania | For vacant WBO Global flyweight title |
| 15 | Loss | 11–2–2 | Thanongsak Simsri | UD | 12 | Apr 13, 2024 | EDION Arena Osaka, Osaka, Japan | Lost OPBF light-flyweight title |
| 14 | Win | 11–1–2 | John Paul Gabunilas | TKO | 1 (12), 1:00 | Aug 15, 2023 | Hoops Dome, Lapu-Lapu City, Philippines | Won vacant OPBF light-flyweight title |
| 13 | Win | 10–1–2 | Sarawut Jiamthong | KO | 1 (10), 0:10 | Dec 28, 2022 | Spaceplus Bangkok RCA, Bangkok, Thailand | Won vacant ABF flyweight title |
| 12 | Win | 9–1–2 | Richard Claveras | KO | 1 (10), 0:41 | Jul 30, 2022 | SM City San Lazaro, Manila, Philippines | |
| 11 | Win | 8–1–2 | Agustin Mauro Gauto | TKO | 2 (8), 1:53 | Mar 26, 2022 | Duty Free Tennis Stadium, Dubai, United Arab Emirates | |
| 10 | Draw | 7–1–2 | Ben Ligas | MD | 8 | Jul 3, 2021 | Urdaneta Cultural Sports Complex, Urdaneta, Philippines | |
| 9 | Win | 7–1–1 | Fernan Agencia | TKO | 8 (8), 2:32 | Nov 10, 2019 | Southern Quezon Convention Center, Gumaca, Philippines | |
| 8 | Win | 6–1–1 | Lu Zou | TKO | 1 (6), 1:06 | Jan 11, 2019 | Xian Qujiang Internal Conventional & Exhibition Center, Xi'an, China | |
| 7 | Win | 5–1–1 | Hui Lu | TKO | 6 (6), 2:30 | Dec 31, 2018 | ShangLi Boston Hotel, Yinchuan, China | |
| 6 | Win | 4–1–1 | Martin Cordova | TKO | 1 (4), 2:32 | Oct 27, 2018 | Tolentino Sports and Activity Center, Tagaytay, Philippines | |
| 5 | Win | 3–1–1 | Xiang Li | MD | 6 | Jul 27, 2018 | Qingdao Guosen Gymnasium, Qingdao, China | |
| 4 | Win | 2–1–1 | Rico Saonoy | TKO | 3 (4), 2:45 | Mar 10, 2018 | Mandaluyong City Hall Grounds, Mandaluyong, Philippines | |
| 3 | Loss | 1–1–1 | ArAr Andales | UD | 4 | Aug 26, 2017 | Molino 3 Magdiwang Road, Bacoor, Philippines | |
| 2 | Win | 1–0–1 | Joel Ramos | TKO | 4 (4), 1:00 | May 20, 2017 | Dampa sa Paseo Seafood Restaurant, Malabon, Philippines | |
| 1 | Draw | 0–0–1 | Gringo Navarro | PTS | 4 | Nov 5, 2016 | BSU Gym, La Trinidad, Philippines | |
