= Christian Araneta =

Filipino boxer (born 1992)

Personal information
- Nickname: The Bomb
- Nationality: Filipino
- Born: Christian Aniadas Araneta; 16 March 1995 (age 31) Cebu, Philippines
- Height: 5 ft 4 in (163 cm)
- Weight: Light-flyweight

Boxing career
- Stance: Southpaw

Boxing record
- Total fights: 28
- Wins: 25
- Win by KO: 20
- Losses: 3

Christian Aniadas Araneta (born 16 March 1995) is a Filipino professional boxer.

== Boxing career ==
Araneta made his professional debut against Garry Rojo on 7 September 2013. He won the fight by a third-round knockout. Araneta amassed a 13–0 record during the next three years, before facing Demsi Manufoe for vacant WBO Oriental light flyweight title, his first major regional title, on 18 March 2017. He won the fight by a first-round knockout. After capturing his first major regional title, Araneta faced Ian Ligutan in a stay-busy fight on 3 April 2018. He won the fight by knockout, 45 seconds into the second round.

Araneta faced Jerry Tomogdan for the vacant WBC-ABC Silver light flyweight title on 18 August 2018. He won the fight by a late twelfth-round stoppage, knocking Tomogdan out with just two seconds remaining in the round. Araneta was next booked to face Vincent Bautista on 22 December 2018. He won the fight by unanimous decision, with scores of 80–72, 79–73 and 79–73.

His 17–0 record earned Araneta the opportunity to face Daniel Valladares in an IBF light flyweight title eliminator on 7 September 2019, at the Arena José Sulaimán in Monterrey, Mexico, in his first fight outside of the Philippines. He retired from the bout at the end of the fourth round, citing an injury to his right shoulder.

After suffering the first loss of his professional career, Araneta was scheduled to face Richard Rosales on 7 October 2020, following a thirteen-month absence from the sport. He won the fight by unanimous decision, with scores of 99–89, 100–88 and 99–98. Araneta next faced Roland Jay Biendima on 18 December 2020. He won the fight by a first-round knockout.

Araneta was booked to face Sivenathi Nontshinga in an IBF light flyweight title eliminator on 24 April 2021, at the Boardwalk Casino in Gqeberha, South Africa, in what was only his second fight outside of the Philippines. He lost the fight by unanimous decision, with two judges scoring the bout 114–113 for Nontshinga, while the third judge awarded him a 115–112 scorecard. Araneta scored the sole knockdown of the fight in the twelfth round, dropping his opponent with a straight left.

Following his second professional loss, Araneta was scheduled to face Richard Claveras on 16 July 2021. He made quick work of his opponent, forcing a corner stoppage at the 1:51 minute mark of the opening round. Araneta faced Arnold Garde on 22 October 2021, in his final fight of the year. He once again won by a first-round stoppage.

Araneta faced the one-time WBA mini-flyweight title challenger Toto Landero at Kumbati 13 on June 17, 2022. He won the fight by unanimous decision. Araneta next faced the Thai veteran Jakrawut Majungoen on 1 April 2023. He won the fight by a ninth-round knockout.

Araneta was eventually arranged against compatriot Arvin Magramo for the IBF light-flyweight title eliminator, taking place at the Nustar Resort and Casino in Cebu, serving as the main event of the Kumbati 16 boxing card, during the match, Araneta started quick and eventually connected an uppercut that scored a knockdown in the first-round of their affair, Magramo was able to beat the count, however, Araneta immediately went back into the attack and threw a left hand followed by a right hook en route to a stunning first-round referee stoppage.

=== IBF light flyweight championship ===
==== Araneta vs. Simsri ====
As Masamichi Yabuki vacated the IBF light flyweight world championship to campaign at the flyweight division, No. 1 IBF-ranked Araneta is set to face No. 2 ranked knockout artist Thanongsak Simsri for vacant IBF light flyweight world championship. On 26 April 2025, it was confirmed that their bout was finalized and will take place on June 19, 2025, at the Ota City General Gymnasium in Tokyo, Japan.

== Professional boxing record ==
28 fights	25 wins	3 losses
By knockout	20	1
By decision	5	2

No.	Result	Record	Opponent	Type	Round, time	Date	Location	Notes
28	Loss	25–3	Thanongsak Simsri	SD	12	19 Jun 2025	Ota City General Gymnasium, Tokyo, Japan	For vacant IBF light flyweight title
27	Win	25–2	Sanchai Yotboon	TKO	1 (8), 0:58	11 Dec 2024	IPI Tingub Gym, Mandaue City, Philippines	
26	Win	24–2	Arvin Magramo	TKO	1 (12), 1:50	26 Jan 2024	Nustar Resort and Casino, Cebu City, Philippines	
25	Win	23–2	Jakrawut Majungoen	KO	9 (10), 1:25	1 Apr 2023	Hoops Dome, Lapu-Lapu City, Philippines	
24	Win	22–2	Toto Landero	UD	10	17 Jun 2022	Parkmall Mandaue City, Mandaue City, Philippines	
23	Win	21–2	Arnold Garde	KO	1 (10), 2:25	22 Oct 2021	IPI Compound, Mandaue City, Philippines	
22	Win	20–2	Richard Claveras	TKO	1 (10), 1:31	16 Jul 2021	Tabunoc Sports Complex, Talisay City, Philippines	
21	Loss	19–2	Sivenathi Nontshinga	UD	12	24 Apr 2021	Boardwalk Casino, Gqeberha, South Africa	
20	Win	19–1	Roland Jay Biendima	KO	1 (10), 2:15	18 Dec 2020	IPI Compound, Mandaue City, Philippines	
19	Win	18–1	Richard Rosales	UD	10	7 Oct 2020	IPI Compound, Mandaue City, Philippines	
18	Loss	17–1	Daniel Valladares	RTD	4 (12), 3:00	7 Sep 2019	Arena José Sulaimán, Monterrey, Mexico	
17	Win	17–0	Vincent Bautista	UD	8	22 Dec 2018	Robinson's Galleria, Cebu CIty, Philippines	
16	Win	16–0	Jerry Tomogdan	KO	12 (12), 2:58	18 Aug 2018	Mandaue City Sports and Cultural Complex, Mandaue City, Philippines	Won vacant WBC-ABCO Silver light flyweight title
15	Win	15–0	Ian Ligutan	KO	2 (6), 0:45	3 Apr 2018	Manolo Fortich Municipal Gymnasium, Manolo Fortich, Philippines	
14	Win	14–0	Demsi Manufoe	KO	1 (12), 1:41	18 Mar 2017	Waterfront Hotel and Casino, Cebu City, Philippines	Won vacant WBO Oriental light flyweight title
13	Win	13–0	Philip Luis Cuerdo	KO	7 (10), 1:06	2 Dec 2016	Mandaue City Sports and Cultural Complex, Mandaue City, Philippines	
12	Win	12–0	Charlie Cabilla	TKO	1 (10), 1:38	30 Jul 2016	Robinson's Galleria, Cebu City, Philippines	
11	Win	11–0	Ryan Tampus	SD	10	9 Jan 2016	Borbon Sports Complex, Borbon, Philippines	
10	Win	10–0	Jesse Espinas	TKO	8 (10), 2:45	12 Sep 2015	Sabang Gym, Danao City, Philippines	
9	Win	9–0	Jason Neri	KO	4 (8), 2:47	14 Jun 2015	Lantapan Municipal Gym, Lantapan, Philippines	
8	Win	8–0	Charlie Cabilla	RTD	8 (10), 3:00	14 Jun 2015	Cawayan Social Center, Cawayan, Philippines	Won vacant PBF light flyweight title
7	Win	7–0	Belmar Plaza	TKO	1 (8), 2:42	10 Jan 2015	Borbon Sports Complex, Borbon, Philippines	
6	Win	6–0	Bonjun Loperez	TKO	2 (8), 1:51	5 Oct 2014	Glan Municipal Gym, Glan, Philippines	
5	Win	5–0	Melmark Dignos	TKO	4 (6), 2:16	23 Aug 2014	Almendras Gym, Davao City, Philippines	
4	Win	4–0	Dondon Amparado	TKO	2 (4), 2:07	24 May 2014	Lagao Gym, General Santos City, Philippines	
3	Win	3–0	Jessie Suacasa	UD	6	20 Mar 2014	Lagao Gym, General Santos City, Philippines	
2	Win	2–0	Reymund Fermin	KO	1 (4), 2:46	10 Jan 2014	Borbon Sports Complex, Borbon, Philippines	
1	Win	1–0	Garry Rojo	KO	3 (4), 0:49	7 Sep 2013	Poblacion Balamban Sports Complex, Balamban, Philippines	
