= Galal Yafai =

English boxer (born 1992)

Galal Yafai جلال يافعي MBE
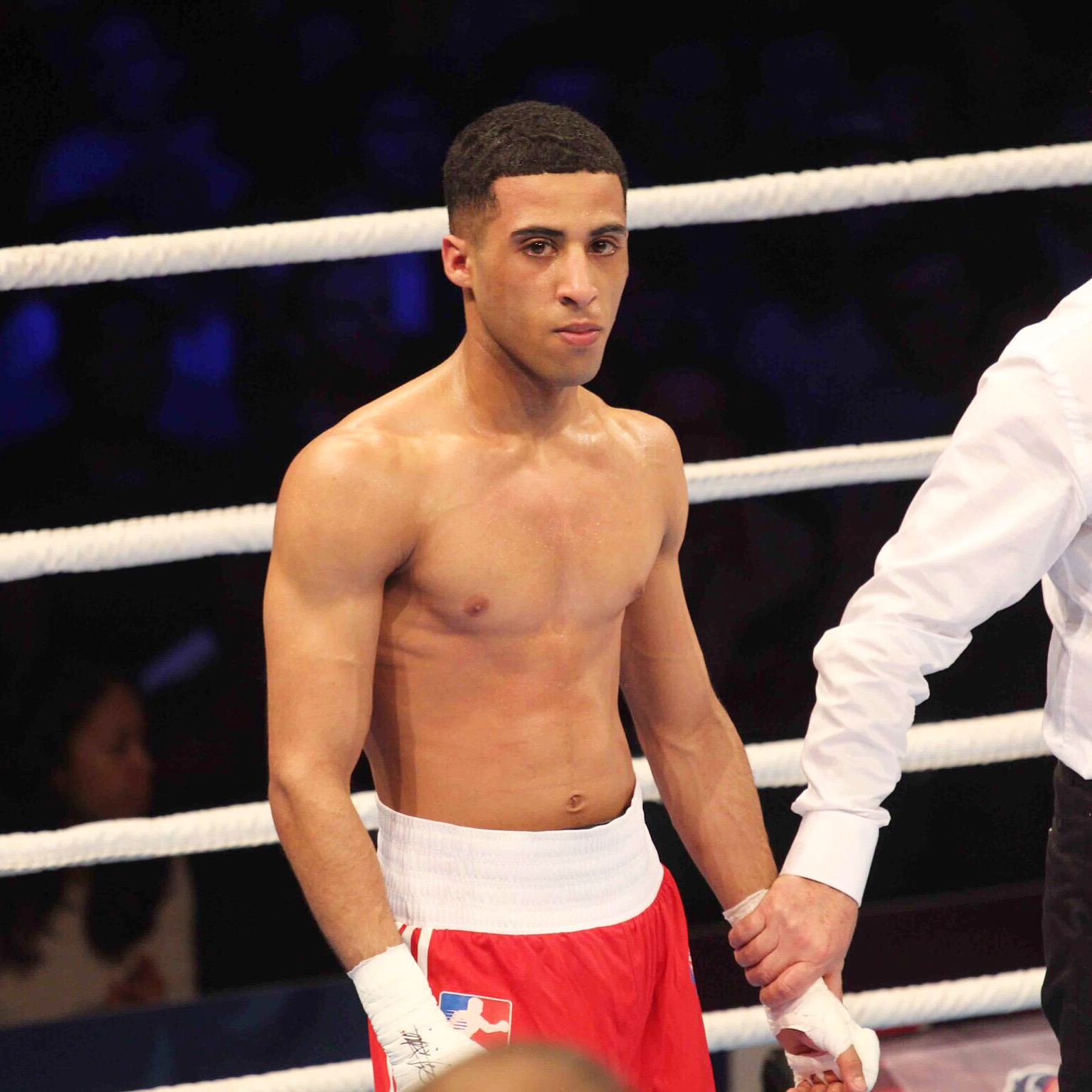
- (2016)

Personal information
- Born: 11 December 1992 (age 33) Birmingham, England
- Height: 5 ft 4 in (163 cm)
- Weight: Flyweight

Boxing career
- Reach: 68 in (173 cm)
- Stance: Southpaw

Boxing record
- Total fights: 10
- Wins: 9
- Win by KO: 7
- No contests: 1
Medal record
Men's Amateur boxing
Representing Great Britain
Olympic Games
Gold medal – first place	2020 Tokyo	Flyweight
European Games
Bronze medal – third place	2019 Minsk	Flyweight
Representing England
Commonwealth Games
Gold medal – first place	2018 Gold Coast	Light-flyweight
European Championships
Silver medal – second place	2017 Kharkiv	Light-flyweight

Galal Yafai (Arabic: جلال يافعي; born 11 December 1992) is a British professional boxer. He has held the World Boxing Council (WBC) interim flyweight title since November 2024.

As an amateur, he won a silver medal at the 2017 European Championships; gold at the 2018 Commonwealth; bronze at the 2019 European Games; and gold at the 2020 Olympics.

== Early life ==
Yafai was born to Yemeni parents. He is the younger brother of boxers Kal Yafai and Gamal Yafai. Yafai was appointed Member of the Order of the British Empire (MBE) in the 2022 New Year Honours for his services to boxing.

== Amateur career ==
While representing England in the light-flyweight division, the southpaw won a silver medal at the 2017 European Championships and gold at the 2018 Commonwealth Games, and bronze while representing Great Britain in the flyweight division at the 2019 European Games. He also competed at the 2016 Rio Olympics.

At the 2016 European Boxing Olympic Qualification Tournament held in Samsun, Turkey, Yafai defeated Samuel Carmona Heredia of Spain by unanimous decision in his semifinal to secure his place in the 2016 Olympic. He won his round of 32 fight defeating Simplice Fotsala of Cameroon. He lost his Round of 16 fight to Joahnys Argilagos of Cuba.

In May 2019, Yafai was selected to compete at the 2019 European Games in Minsk, Belarus. He also competed at the 2019 World Championships in Yekaterinburg, Russia, where he lost by unanimous decision to Billal Bennama in the quarter-finals. He qualified to represent Great Britain at the 2020 Summer Olympics, where he won the gold medal in the flyweight division beating Carlo Paalam of the Philippines in the final.

== Professional career ==
=== Early career ===
Yafai faced Carlos Vado Bautista for the vacant WBC International flyweight title on 27 February 2022, in his professional debut, on the undercard of the Lawrence Okolie and Michal Cieslak cruiserweight title bout. He captured the regional title by a fifth-round technical knockout, as Bautista's corner decided to throw in the towel near the end of the round.

Yafai successfully defended his WBC International flyweight title against Miguel Cartagena on 30 April 2022, in his United States debut, on the undercard of the Katie Taylor vs. Amanda Serrano title unification bout, via a second round corner retirement.

On 6 April 2024 in Las Vegas, Yafai stopped Agustin Mauro Gauto in the eighth round and retained his WBC International flyweight title. Yafai stopped Sergio Oliva in round three at Canon Medical Arena in Sheffield, England, on 28 September 2024.

=== WBC interim flyweight championship ===
==== Yafai vs. Edwards ====
Discussions commenced in August 2024 for Yafa to compete against Sunny Edwards (21–1, 4 KOs) for the vacant interim WBC flyweight title. Eddie Hearn confirmed this, stating that he was "working hard" to facilitate the match. Edwards recovered from his defeat to Jesse Rodriguez by securing a technical decision victory against Adrian Curiel in June, positioning himself favourably to re-enter the title contention. On 13 September, the fight was made official, to take place at bp pulse LIVE in Birmingham, England on 30 November 2024. The fight was billed as Bloodline, due to the history of the families. Edwards said, “This fight has always been inevitable. Our last names hold weight in British boxing and around the world – and it’s really time to put to bed the Edwards-Yafai Saga." Yafai was excited at the opportunity, stating, “This is going to be a massive fight for British boxing. I need to win a World Title, and this is a fight that will put me on the cusp of fighting for one when I win in my hometown on November 30.” Both showed respect towards each other during fight week. Edwards weighed 111 pounds and Yafai weighed 111.4 pounds.

In a significant match, Yafai secured victory over Edwards by TKO in the sixth round, thereby claiming the WBC interim flyweight title. Yafai employed consistent pressure and striking effectiveness to achieve the win. Yafai established dominance early in the match by landing a powerful right hook that appeared to impact Edwards significantly within the first few seconds. He sustained continuous pressure, preventing Edwards from establishing his rhythm. By the second round, Edwards displayed clear signs of distress, communicating to his corner, "I don’t want to be here," indicating the difficulties he was experiencing in the fight. Yafai continued to apply pressure, effectively cutting off the ring and landing combinations while Edwards was unable to respond positively. Throughout the third, fourth, and fifth rounds, Yafai showcased a superior work rate, landing numerous clean shots while keeping Edwards on the defensive. Edwards landed the occasional counter-punch. The bout concluded in the sixth round when Yafai delivered a series of punches that left Edwards unable to protect himself. The referee halted the match one minute and ten seconds into the round to prevent any additional harm to Edwards. Yafai gained revenge on his loss to Edwards in their amateur days. After the match, Edwards announced his retirement, recognizing the physical toll that boxing had imposed on him. He stated that his body was "falling apart" and noted a diminishing passion for the sport that had previously motivated him.

Yafai articulated his dissatisfaction regarding the lack of recognition for his victory over Edwards, asserting that excuses had eclipsed his accomplishment. He noted that many considered Edwards a formidable opponent beforehand and were now grappling with the implication that his win was less significant due to assertions that Edwards was not in peak condition. Yafai emphasized his respect for Edwards while addressing the remarks made by Edwards following their match.

==== Yafai vs. Rodríguez ====
Yafai was scheduled to make his first defence against veteran, former mini flyweight world champion Francisco Rodríguez Jr. (39–6–1, 27 KOs). The fight went to purse bids, with a winning bid of $222,000 by sole bidders Matchroom Boxing in March 2025. In April, the card was announced to take place at the bp Pulse LIVE, with Shabaz Masoud vs. Peter McGrail as the headline on 21 June 2025. Masoud was forced to withdraw from his fight, pushing Yafai and Rodríguez to main event.

Yafai lost the belt and his unbeaten professional record via a lopsided unanimous decision. The scorecards read 119–108, 119–108, and 118–109 all in favour of Rodríguez. He applied a non-stop attack from the beginning, while Yafai was never allowed to get close to hurting him. Yafai showed a lot of heart to hear the final. By mid fight, both boxers were cut around the eyes. Yafai was dropped in the seventh round, only for the referee to not call it a knockdown. it was evident from here that Yafai needed a stoppage, but he could not keep up with the pace Rodríguez had set. Prior to the ninth round, both men were checked over by the ringside doctor. Yafai was dropped in the twelfth round, but beat the count. His trainer Rob McCracken had the towel in his hands from this point, but allowed his boxer to hear the final bell. Yafai's promoter Eddie Hearn argued allowing Yafai to continue taking heavy shots later in the fight. He said, “It's difficult. Maybe once you get to [Round] 10 or 11 and there isn't really … it's not looking like there's a way back in the fight. I mean, I looked over at Rob McCracken, he had his towel in the 12th round ready to go in, and obviously when he got dropped, but Galal did a good job of holding. But he took a lot of punishment in the last part of the fight.” Rodríguez was now the mandatory for full champion Kenshiro Teraji. Rodríguez threw over 1000 punches, landing over half of them. CompuBox showed Rodríguez landed 575 of 1089 punches thrown (53%), a flyweight record and Yafai connected with 230 of his 795 thrown (34%).

On 9 July 2025, Matchroom Boxing revealed that Rodríguez had tested positive in his post-fight anti-doping test, administered by VADA. He returned an "adverse analytical finding" according to the statement. On 27 July, Yafai was re-instated as the interim WBC champion, but ordered to a rematch against Rodríguez, who was placed on a 12 month probation. The WBC concluded its investigation, stating that Rodríguez did not intentionally consume any substances to enhance his performance. On 30 March 2026, Rodríguez was given a two-year ban from boxing in the UK, backdated from 30 July 2025. UKAD did not claim intentional doping, suggesting the possibility of unintentional ingestion or other mitigating factors. The result was finally changed to a no contest on 30 March 2026.

==== Yafai vs. Sandoval ====
On 14 August 2025, the WBC reversed its previous decision and mandated Ricardo Sandoval (27–2, 18 KOs) to defend his WBC title against Yafai. Sandoval, who also held the WBA championship, secured his unified status by defeating Kenshiro Teraji in July. Purse bids took place on 13 March 2026, which was won by Matchroom Boxing, who outbid Golden Boy Promotions. The winning bid was $625,000. As per WBC rules, 90% of the winning bid ($562,500) was to be split between the boxers, with Sandoval receiving 55% ($309,375) and Yafai receiving 45% ($253,125). The remaining 10% ($62,500) would then be given to the winner. On 13 April, Sandoval's manager, Abraham Perez, stated that an announcement was expected for the fight to take place on 6 June in Sheffield, as a co-main event on the Dalton Smith vs. Alberto Puello undercard. The fight was formally announced on 17 April, taking place at Sheffield Arena. On 27 April, Smith pulled out of the card due to an injury, which pushed Yafai's fight to headline the card. On 15 May, Yafai was forced to pull out of the fight due to an injury he picked up whilst in training.

== Professional boxing record ==
10 fights	9 wins	0 losses
By knockout	7	0
By decision	2	0
No contests	1	

No.	Result	Record	Opponent	Type	Round, time	Date	Location	Notes
10	NC	9–0	Francisco Rodríguez Jr.	NC	12	21 Jun 2025	bp pulse LIVE, Birmingham, England	WBC interim flyweight title at stake; Originally a UD loss for Yafai, overturned after Rodriguez failed a drugs test.
9	Win	9–0	Sunny Edwards	TKO	6 (12), 1:10	30 Nov 2024	bp pulse LIVE, Birmingham, England	Won vacant WBC interim flyweight title
8	Win	8–0	Sergio Oliva	TKO	3 (10), 1:49	28 Sep 2024	Canon Medical Arena, Sheffield, England	
7	Win	7–0	Agustin Mauro Gauto	TKO	8 (10), 2:40	6 Apr 2024	Fontainebleau Las Vegas, Winchester, Nevada, U.S.	Retained WBC International flyweight title
6	Win	6–0	Rocco Santomauro	UD	10	16 Dec 2023	Desert Diamond Arena, Glendale, Arizona, U.S.	Retained WBC International flyweight title
5	Win	5–0	Tommy Frank	TKO	1 (10), 1:40	19 Aug 2023	Uilita Arena, Birmingham, England	Retained WBC International flyweight title
4	Win	4–0	Moisés Calleros	TKO	4 (10), 0:44	1 Apr 2023	The O2 Arena, London, England	
3	Win	3–0	Gohan Rodriguez Garcia	SD	10	5 Nov 2022	Etihad Arena, Abu Dhabi, United Arab Emirates	Retained WBC International flyweight title
2	Win	2–0	Miguel Cartagena	RTD	2 (10), 3:00	30 Apr 2022	Madison Square Garden, New York City, New York, U.S.	Retained WBC International flyweight title
1	Win	1–0	Carlos Vado Bautista	TKO	5 (10), 2:11	27 Feb 2022	The O2 Arena, London, England	Won vacant WBC International flyweight title

== See also ==
- List of male boxers
- Notable boxing families
- List of southpaw stance boxers

Sporting positions
Regional boxing titles
Vacant Title last held by Jackson Chauke	WBC International flyweight champion 27 February 2022 – 30 November 2024; Won interim title	Vacant
World boxing titles
Vacant Title last held by McWilliams Arroyo	WBC flyweight champion Interim title 30 November 2024 – present	Incumbent
