= Christian Medina =

Mexican boxer (born 2000)

Personal information
- Nickname: Chispa ("Spark")
- Born: Christian Medina Jiménez; 22 April 2000 (age 26)
- Height: 5 ft 5 in (165 cm)
- Weight: Bantamweight

Boxing career
- Reach: 67 in (170 cm)
- Stance: Orthodox

Boxing record
- Total fights: 31
- Wins: 27
- Win by KO: 19
- Losses: 4

Christian Medina Jiménez (born 22 April 2000) is a Mexican professional boxer who has held the World Boxing Organization (WBO) bantamweight title since September 2025.

== Boxing career ==
Medina faced Ryosuke Nishida in an IBF bantamweight title eliminator on 11 August 2023. He lost the fight by unanimous decision, with scores of 118–110, 117–111 and 116–112.

Medina faced Ivan Meneses in an eight-round super bantamweight bout on 26 January 2024, at El Domo del Code Jalisco in Guadalajara. He won the bout by TKO in the first round at 2 minutes and 59 seconds.

Medina faced Alexis Molina Aguirre for the WBO Latin American Bantamweight Championship on 22 November 2024, in Guadalajara, Jalisco. He won the bout by TKO in 1 minute and 4 seconds of the 5th round and successfully capturing the title.

=== WBO Bantamweight Championship ===
==== Medina vs. Takei ====
Medina challenged Yoshiki Takei for the WBO bantamweight title on 14 September 2025, at the Aichi International Arena in Nagoya, Japan. He upset the odds and won the bout by TKO in the fourth round, winning the world title in the process.

==== Medina vs. Curiel ====
Medina successfully defended the title with a unanimous decision win over Adrian Curiel at Domo Alcalde in Guadalajara, Mexico, on 6 February 2026.

== Professional boxing record ==
31 fights	27 wins	4 losses
By knockout	19	0
By decision	8	4

No.	Result	Record	Opponent	Type	Round, time	Date	Location	Notes
31	Win	27–4	Adrian Curiel	UD	12	06 Feb 2026	Domo Alcalde, Guadalajara, Mexico	Retained WBO bantamweight title
30	Win	26–4	Yoshiki Takei	TKO	4 (12), 1:21	14 Sep 2025	IG Arena, Nagoya, Japan	Won WBO bantamweight title
29	Win	25–4	Juan Ramirez Marquez	TKO	2 (10), 2:16	30 May 2025	CODE Jalisco, Guadalajara, Mexico	
28	Win	24–4	Alexis Molina Aguirre	TKO	5 (10), 1:04	22 Nov 2024	Guadalajara, Mexico	Won vacant WBO Latino bantamweight title
27	Win	23–4	Victor Trejo Garcia	TKO	7 (10), 2:43	17 May 2024	San Juan de los Lagos, Mexico	
26	Win	22–4	Ivan Meneses	TKO	1 (8), 2:59	26 Jan 2024	CODE Jalisco, Guadalajara, Mexico	
25	Loss	21–4	Ryosuke Nishida	UD	12	11 Aug 2023	EDION Arena, Osaka, Japan	
24	Win	21–3	Jorge Alberto Sanchez Zarate	UD	8	7 Oct 2022	Centro de Usos Multiples, Hermosillo, Mexico	
23	Win	20–3	Alejandro Espinoza Tinoco	UD	10	1 Jul 2022	Gimnasio Revolucion, San Nicolás de los Garza, Mexico	
22	Win	19–3	Angel Aviles Armenta	TKO	6 (10), 1:19	11 Feb 2022	Arena Alcalde, Guadalajara, Mexico	
21	Win	18–3	Edinso Torres	KO	1 (10), 2:44	12 Nov 2021	Centro Internacional de Convenciones, Puerto Vallarta, Mexico	Won vacant WBC Youth bantamweight title
20	Win	17–3	Axel Ahumada	TKO	1 (10), 2:12	8 Oct 2021	Arena Sonora, Hermosillo, Mexico	
19	Win	16–3	Noe Robles Salas	TKO	? (10), 2:59	25 Jun 2021	Grand Hotel, Tijuana, Mexico	
18	Win	15–3	Marvin Noe Diaz Canales	TKO	2 (8), 2:06	26 Mar 2021	Lienzo Charro de Ajijic, Jocotepec, Mexico	
17	Win	14–3	Cristian Cortes Gonzalez	UD	8	26 Feb 2021	Lienzo Charro, Talpa de Allende, Mexico	
16	Win	13–3	Marvin Noe Diaz Canales	KO	1 (8), 2:06	18 Jan 2020	Centro de Convenciones, Tamazula de Gordiano, Mexico	
15	Win	12–3	Jorge Alberto Sanchez Zarate	UD	6	26 Oct 2019	Plaza de Toros La Union, Ameca, Mexico	
14	Win	11–3	Brian Rodriguez Esquivel	TKO	3 (10), 2:58	4 Oct 2019	Gimnasio Mexico 68, Guadalajara, Mexico	
13	Win	10–3	Martin Jimenez Delgado	UD	6	10 Aug 2019	Estadio Antonio R. Marquez, San Juan de los Lagos, Mexico	
12	Loss	9–3	Ruben Gustavo Vega	SD	8	1 Jun 2019	Mazatlán, Mexico	
11	Loss	9–2	Benito Sanchez Garcia	UD	10	16 Feb 2019	Unidad Deportiva Río de Janeiro, Guadalajara, Mexico	For vacant WBC FECOMBOX bantamweight title
10	Win	9–1	Victor Orozco Mendoza	TKO	1 (8), 2:22	21 Dec 2018	Palenque de la Feria, Tlaquepaque, Mexico	
9	Win	8–1	Sergio Flores Aguilar	UD	6	6 Oct 2018	Arena Jalisco, Guadalajara, Mexico	
8	Win	7–1	Ugo Fougeras	TKO	3 (6), 0:22	18 Aug 2018	Domo del Parque San Rafael, Guadalajara, Mexico	
7	Win	6–1	Carlos Roberto Perez	TKO	1 (4), 0:46	21 Jul 2018	Domo del Parque San Rafael, Guadalajara, Mexico	
6	Win	5–1	Juan Diego Zaragoza	UD	4	9 Jun 2018	Unidad Deportiva Río de Janeiro, Guadalajara, Mexico	
5	Win	4–1	Cristian Moises Lopez	TKO	3 (4)	7 Apr 2018	Domo del Parque San Rafael, Guadalajara, Mexico	
4	Loss	3–1	Mario Victorino Vera	UD	4	10 Mar 2018	Domo del Parque San Rafael, Guadalajara, Mexico	
3	Win	3–0	Jose Antonio Santos	TKO	1 (4), 1:19	24 Feb 2018	Domo del Parque San Rafael, Guadalajara, Mexico	
2	Win	2–0	Alfonso Garcia	TKO	1 (4), 1:13	10 Feb 2018	Domo del Parque San Rafael, Guadalajara, Mexico	
1	Win	1–0	Moises Corona	TKO	1 (4), 1:52	9 Dec 2017	Domo del Parque San Rafael, Guadalajara, Mexico	

== See also ==
- List of male boxers
- List of Mexican boxing world champions
- List of world bantamweight boxing champions

Sporting positions
Regional boxing titles
Vacant Title last held by Carlos Norberto Lopez	WBC Youth bantamweight champion 12 November 2021 – 2022; Vacated	Vacant Title next held by Floyd Diaz
Vacant Title last held by Maximiliano Sergio Maidana	WBO Latino bantamweight champion 22 November 2024 – 14 September 2025; Won world title	Vacant
World boxing titles
Preceded by Yoshiki Takei	WBO bantamweight champion 14 September 2025 – present	Incumbent
