= Mark Vicelles =

Filipino boxer

Personal information
- Nickname: Rasta Mac
- Nationality: Filipino
- Born: Ronnie Mark Mendoza Vicelles; 10 December 1995 (age 30) Lebak, Philippines
- Height: 5 ft 5 in (165 cm)
- Weight: Light-flyweight

Boxing career
- Stance: Orthodox

Boxing record
- Total fights: 25
- Wins: 21
- Win by KO: 11
- Losses: 3
- Draws: 1

Ronnie Mark Mendoza Vicelles (born 10 December 1995) is a Filipino professional boxer.

== Professional boxing career ==
Vicelles made his professional debut against Jonard Tabar on 9 January 2016, whom he by a second-round knockout. He amassed an 11–0 record during the next three years, with five victories coming by way of stoppage. Vicelles was scheduled to challenge Jesse Espinas for the WBA Asia South light-flyweight title on 6 July 2019. He won the fight by majority decision, with scores of 96–94, 96–94 and 95–95.

Vicelles was scheduled to face Junuel Lacar on 7 October 2020, at the IPI Compound in Mandaue, Philippines. He won the fight by a fourth-round knockout. Vicelles was expected to fight Arnold Garde on 18 December 2020, however Garde withdrew from the bout for health reasons.

Vicelles was scheduled to face Richard Rosales in the main event of a Kumbati series event held on 27 March 2021, at the IPI Compound in Mandaue, Philippines. He won the fight by a fourth-round knockout, stopping Rosales with a left uppercut to the body. Vicelles was scheduled to face the undefeated Jerven Mama on 3 July 2021, in the co-main event of an OPBF Silver featherweight title bout between Pete Apolicar and Jess Rhey Wahimal. He won the fight by a tenth-round knockout, stopping Mama at the very last second of the last round.

Vicelles was expected to face the unbeaten prospect Jayson Vayson on 30 October 2021. A month before the fight was supposed to take place, on 24 September 2021, Vayson withdrew from the fight due to an injury sustained in training. Although Vicelles was supposed to face a replacement opponent, he was likewise forced to withdraw from the bout due to an injury sustained in training. He later revealed that he had suffered a right elbow injury.

Vicelles was scheduled to face the 2018 WBA minimumweight title challenger Toto Landero on 10 December 2021, in the main event of a Kumong Bol-anon II event. He won the fight by unanimous decision, with scores of 96–94, 97–93 and 96–94.

Vicelles is scheduled to face Richard Claveras in the main event of "Kumbati 12" on 26 March 2022, at the IPI Compound in Cebu, Philippines. He won the fight by a first-round technical knockout, forcing the referee to stop the bout after knocking Claveras down twice by the 1:42 minute mark of the opening round.

Vicelles faced Jaysever Abcede at the next iteration of the Kumbati series, "Kumbati 13", on 17 June 2022. He won the fight by a first-round knockout, dropping Abcede near the end of the opening round. Vicelles was booked to face fellow Filipno Regie Suganob in an IBF junior flyweight title eliminator on 25 February 2023. He lost the fight by technical decision in the sixth round.

== Professional boxing record ==
25 fights	21 wins	3 losses
By knockout	11	2
By decision	10	1
Draws	1	

No.	Result	Record	Opponent	Type	Round, time	Date	Location	Notes
25	Loss	21–3–1	Thanongsak Simsri	TKO	2 (12), 2:05	26 Sep 2026	FujisanMesse, Fuji, Japan	For IBF light flyweight title
24	Win	21–2–1	Carlo Diaz VII	UD	10	29 Apr 2026	Hamamatsu, Shizuoka, Japan	Won vacant OPBF light flyweight title
23	Loss	20–2–1	Kosuke Tomioka	TKO	7 (8), 1:38	7 Sep 2025	Grandship, Shizuoka, Japan	
22	Win	20–1–1	Xiang Li	UD	8	18 May 2025	FujisanMesse, Fuji, Japan	
21	Win	19–1–1	Albert Francisco	UD	10	29 Jun 2024	Liloan Sports Complex, Liloan, Philippines	
20	Win	18–1–1	Ronald Alapormina	RTD	3 (8), 3:00	28 Oct 2023	Tuburan Sports Complex, Tuburan, Philippines	
19	Loss	17–1–1	Regie Suganob	TD	6 (10), 1:39	25 Feb 2023	Calape Cultural Center, Calape, Philippines	Unanimous TD after Vicelles is cut on his right eyebrow caused by an accidental headbutt
18	Win	17–0–1	Jaysever Abcede	KO	1 (10), 2:27	17 Jun 2022	Parkmall Mandaue City, Mandaue City, Philippines	
17	Win	16–0–1	Richard Claveras	KO	1 (10), 1:42	26 Mar 2022	IPI Compound, Cebu, Philippines	
16	Win	15–0–1	Toto Landero	UD	10	10 Dec 2021	Poblacion, Dauis, Philippines	
15	Win	14–0–1	Jerven Mama	KO	10 (10), 2:59	3 Jul 2021	IPI Tingub Gym, Mandaue City, Philippines	
14	Win	13–0–1	Richard Rosales	KO	4 (10)	27 Mar 2021	IPI Compound, Mandaue City, Philippines	
13	Win	12–0–1	Junuel Lacar	KO	4 (10), 1:47	7 Oct 2020	IPI Compound, Mandaue City, Philippines	
12	Win	11–0–1	Jesse Espinas	UD	10	6 Jul 2019	Panphil B. Frasco Memorial Sports Complex, Liloan, Philippines	Won inaugural WBA Asia South light flyweight title
11	Win	10–0–1	Robert Onggocan	UD	5 (10), 0:38	6 Jul 2019	Parkmall Mandaue City, Mandaue City, Philippines	Won vacant Philippines Visayas PBA light flyweight title
10	Win	9–0–1	Lyster Jun Pronco	UD	8	25 Nov 2018	Robinson’s Mall Atrium, General Santos City, Philippines	
9	Win	8–0–1	Roldan Sasan	TKO	3 (8), 2:12	2 May 2018	Florance Technological College Gym, Barangay Virgen, Philippines	
8	Win	7–0–1	Daryl Monggon	RTD	2 (4), 3:00	14 Mar 2018	Lugait Freedom Park, Lugait, Philippines	
7	Win	6–0–1	Ernesto Alera	UD	6	23 Dec 2017	Enan Chiong Activity Center, Naga City, Philippines	
6	Win	5–0–1	Rey Tagulaylay	UD	6	27 Oct 2017	Mandaue City Sports and Cultural Complex, Mandaue City, Philippines	
5	Win	4–0–1	Fabio Marfa	TKO	5 (6), 1:34	18 Mar 2017	Waterfront Hotel and Casino, Cebu City, Philippines	
4	Draw	3–0–1	Rodel Kirk Pelenio	UD	6	30 Sep 2016	Poblacion Balamban Sports Complex, Balamban, Philippines	
3	Win	3–0	Jesrel Corabal	UD	4	30 Jul 2016	Robinson's Galleria, Cebu City, Philippines	
2	Win	2–0	Junrey Amora	TKO	2 (4), 2:32	6 Mar 2016	Robinson's Galleria, Cebu City, Philippines	
1	Win	1–0	Jonard Tabar	KO	2 (4), 1:21	9 Jan 2016	Borbon Sports Complex, Borbon, Philippines	
