= Jesse Espinas =

Filipino boxer (born 1992)

Personal information
- Nickname: Little Giant
- Nationality: Filipino
- Born: Jesse Oliberos Espinas; November 29, 1992 (age 33) Oroquieta, Misamis Occidental, Philippines
- Height: 1.57 m (5 ft 2 in)
- Weight: Mini flyweight; Light flyweight; Flyweight; Super flyweight

Boxing career
- Stance: Southpaw

Boxing record
- Total fights: 33
- Wins: 26
- Win by KO: 16
- Losses: 7

Jesse Oliberos Espinas (born 29 November 1992), also known by his nickname Little Giant is a Filipino professional boxer.

== Professional career ==
=== Early years ===
Jesse Espinas made his professional debut on 28 April 2012 against 1–0–1 Abel Gayhun at Iligan, Espinas won via 6-rounds unanimous decision. Espinas would win his next two bouts via first-round knockouts to compose a record of 3–0 before facing 10–5–1 Ronelle Ferreras in an 8-rounder bout at the famed Cuneta Astrodome where he would lose for the first time via majority decision.

==== Espinas vs. Araneta ====
After enduring his first loss, Espinas went on a seven-winning streak before facing Christian Araneta on 12 September 2015 in Davao City, Araneta would end Espinas' win streak as he stopped Espinas in the eight round of their scheduled 10 rounds, making this to this day Espinas' sole knockout loss.

=== Rise up the ranks ===
==== Espinas vs. Canoy ====
After losing to Araneta, Espinas challenged the reigning Asian Boxing Federation (ABF) mini-flyweight champion Joey Canoy for the title on 12 January 2016, Espinas defeated the rising prospect via fifth-round TKO.

==== Espinas vs. Paipharob ====
On 26 February 2016, just a month and few weeks after his last bout, Espinas fought former WBA interim mini-flyweight champion, and reigning PABA and WBO Oriental light-flyweight undefeated champion Paipharob Kokietgym for the WBO Oriental title in Wat Kokkuod, Surin, Thailand. Espinas, who was the underdog, dropped the Thai three times before spectacularly stopping him in the eight round, which assumingly sets him high up in the WBO rankings as Paipharob Kokietgym was previously ranked #2. Eventually, it caused Paipharob Kokietgym to retire until his return on 2023 after a 7-years hiatus.

==== Espinas vs. Dante ====
After defeating Indonesians Tommy Seran and Silem Serang, both in Bangkok, Thailand, which made him rank at the Top 15s in three of four sanctioning bodies at light-flyweight and also among the top 15 at mini-flyweight with the fourth, Espinas fought tough gatekeeper Lito "Naruto" Dante on 21 December 2016 in Muntinlupa. Espinas and Dante capped off the year with a bloody brawl, the bout was for 10 rounds but was stopped on the eight-round due to a clash of heads that gave Espinas a long, wide gash through his left eyebrow, ending in a TD, Espinas won the close bout via unanimous TD with a close scores of 77–75 thrice.

==== Espinas vs. Joaquino, Abutan ====
On 15 January 2018, Espinas fought Francisco Rodríguez Jr.'s previous foe Elias Joaquino for the vacant Philippines Mindanao Professional Boxing Federation (MinProBA) light-flyweight title, Espinas won via UD with the scores of 95–94, 96–92 and 95–93. On 22 May 2018 Biñan Town Plaza, Biñan, Espinas challenged the reigning and defending PGAB light-flyweight champion Lester Abutan, which would allegedly determine the best Filipino boxer in the division, Espinas won via UD.

==== Espinas vs. Heno ====
On 11 August 2018, Espinas fought the reigning and defending OPBF light-flyweight champion Edward Heno at San Pedro, Laguna, Espinas' 8-fights winning streak would be cut off as his compatriot cut it with a unanimous decision victory. After this loss, Espinas seemingly took the role of a gatekeeper.

=== Gatekeeper ===
==== Espinas vs. Vicelles ====
On 6 July 2019, Espinas fought unbeaten prospect Mark Vicelles for the inaugural WBA Asia South light-flyweight title at Liloan. Vicelles beat Espinas via majority decision to claim the title. On the weigh-in day, Vicelles was successful to make weight for the 108lbs limit of the division, weighing at 107.7lbs whilst Espinas merely made weight only weighing .8 lbs above the mini-flyweight's 105lbs limit.

==== Espinas vs. Cuello ====
On 12 October 2019, Espinas fought former world-title challenger and current Asian Boxing Federation (ABF) bantamweight champion Denver Cuello in a non-titled bout, Espinas scored a surprising, albeit underdog unanimous decision victory with the scores of 96–94 and 97–93 twice. Espinas also expressed his adoration for Cuello, stating that he just defeated his "idol".

==== Espinas vs. Domingo, Gabunilas ====
After 2 years and 3 months worth of hiatus, Espinas returned on 26 February 2022 against rising prospect Esneth Domingo in the Sanman Gym at General Santos, in an event named "Sanman Bubble VIII", the bubbles series are meant for the bouts that takes place during the COVID-19 pandemic. Domingo won via unanimous decision, with all of the judges' scorecards reading a tight 96–94. On 20 December 2022, Espinas challenged prospect and subsequent OPBF light-flyweight title-challenger John Paul Gabunilas in San Fernando, Cebu, Espinas lost via UD.

==== Espinas vs. Davidas ====
On 14 May 2023, Espinas defeated worthy Ruben Davidas for the vacant Philippine Boxing Federation (PBF) light-flyweight title via stunning first-round KO in Alegria, Surigao del Norte.

==== Espinas vs. Tshabalala ====
On early August 2023, Espinas was scheduled to fight South African light-flyweight champion and subsequent IBO champion Mpumelelo Tshabalala in a bout scheduled for the vacant WBO Inter-Continental light-flyweight belt on 20 August 2023 in Soweto, South Africa. Espinas would fail as he loses via UD again, marking his seventh career loss.

On 12 July 2024, Espinas and his trusted coach Marvin Alegria flew to Serpukhov for an upcoming "exhibition" or "IBA pro match" against Russian former amateur star Vasilii Egorov for 6 rounds. Before the bout, Espinas, his team, alongside Jayr Raquinel's team was able to meet boxing legend Roy Jones Jr. hours before the bouts. Espinas lost via UD, the bout was also undercard of the WBA bridgerweight world crown between winner Muslim Gadzhimagomedov and Chinese Zhaoxin Zhang.

=== Second rise ===
==== Espinas vs. Cao ====
After beating Thai journeyman Adisak Ketpiam and experienced compatriot Jerald Paclar in the flyweight division, on 21 June 2025, in Huhehaote, China, Espinas challenged the reigning Asian Boxing Council (ABCO) super-flyweight champion Jiangtao Cao who has defended the title twice already and has been unbeaten for the last ten bouts, Espinas stunned his opponent early in the fifth round en route to a stoppage to become the WBC Asia super-flyweight champion.

== Professional boxing record ==
33 fights	26 wins	7 losses
By knockout	16	1
By decision	10	6

No.	Result	Record	Opponent	Type	Round, time	Date	Location	Notes
33	Win	26–7	Komgrich Nantapech	TKO	1 (6)	28 Mar 2026	World Siam Stadium, Bangkok, Thailand	
32	Win	25–7	April Jay Abne	TKO	8 (12), 2:34	12 Oct 2025	University of Abra's Bangued Campus Gov. Andres B. Bernos Gymnasium, Bangued, Philippines	Won vacant IBF Asia flyweight title
31	Win	24–7	Jiangtao Cao	TKO	5 (10), 0:22	21 Jun 2025	Hohhot, Inner Mongolia, China	Won WBC-ABCO super-flyweight title
30	Win	23–7	Jerald Paclar	SD	10	25 Jan 2025	Public Plaza, Iligan, Philippines	
29	Win	22–7	Adisak Ketpiam	KO	2 (6), 1:57	26 Sep 2024	Spaceplus Bangkok RCA, Bangkok, Thailand	
28	Loss	21–7	Mpumelelo Tshabalala	UD	10	20 Aug 2023	Orlando Community Hall, Soweto, South Africa	For vacant WBO Inter-Continental light-flyweight title
27	Win	21–6	Ruben Davidas	KO	1 (10), 0:27	14 May 2023	Don Francisco Kikoy Bagol Sports Complex, Alegria, Philippines	Won vacant PBF light-flyweight title
26	Loss	20–6	John Paul Gabunilas	MD	10	20 Dec 2022	San Fernando Sports Complex, San Fernando, Philippines	
25	Loss	20–5	Esneth Domingo	UD	10	26 Feb 2022	Sanman Gym, General Santos, Philippines	
24	Win	20–4	Denver Cuello	UD	10	12 Oct 2019	The Flash Grand Ballroom of the Elorde Sports Complex, Parañaque, Philippines	
23	Loss	19–4	Mark Vicelles	MD	10	6 Jul 2019	Panphil B. Frasco Memorial Sports Complex, Liloan, Philippines	For inaugural WBA Asia South light-flyweight title
22	Loss	19–3	Edward Heno	UD	12	11 Aug 2018	San Pedro Gymnasium, San Pedro, Laguna, Philippines	For OPBF light-flyweight title
21	Win	19–2	Lester Abutan	UD	12	22 May 2018	Biñan Town Plaza, Biñan, Philippines	Won Philippines GAB light-flyweight title
20	Win	18–2	Elias Joaquino	UD	10	15 Jan 2018	Barangay Tablon Gymnasium, Cagayan de Oro, Philippines	Won vacant MinProBA light-flyweight title
19	Win	17–2	Jason Mopon	UD	8	30 Sep 2017	Public Plaza, Iligan, Philippines	
18	Win	16–2	Lito Dante	TD	8 (10), 0:47	21 Dec 2016	Barangay Cupang Covered Court, Muntinlupa, Philippines	Unanimous TD after Espinas cut on left eyebrow caused by an accidental headbutt
17	Win	15–2	Silem Serang	KO	2 (6)	1 Jul 2016	Suan Lum Night Bazaar Ratchadaphisek, Bangkok, Thailand	
16	Win	14–2	Tommy Seran	TKO	4 (6)	6 May 2016	Suan Lum Night Bazaar Ratchadaphisek, Bangkok, Thailand	
15	Win	13–2	Paipharob Kokietgym	TKO	8 (12)	26 Feb 2016	Wat Kokkuod, Surin, Thailand	Won WBO Oriental light-flyweight title
14	Win	12–2	Joey Canoy	TKO	5 (10), 1:22	12 Jan 2016	Barangay Tablon Gymnasium, Cagayan de Oro, Philippines	Won ABF mini-flyweight title
13	Loss	11–2	Christian Araneta	TKO	8 (10), 2:45	12 Sep 2015	Sabang Gym, Danao, Philippines	
12	Win	11–1	Michael Borja	TKO	2 (8), 1:25	14 Feb 2015	Barangay Bulua Covered Court, Cagayan de Oro, Philippines	
11	Win	10–1	Rey Morano	TKO	3 (8), 1:27	7 Dec 2014	Central Market Gym, Iligan, Philippines	
10	Win	9–1	Rodel Tejares	TKO	7 (10), 1:15	4 Oct 2014	Macasandig Covered Court, Cagayan de Oro, Philippines	
9	Win	8–1	Lyster Jun Pronco	TKO	8 (10), 2:59	16 Aug 2014	Macasandig Gym, Cagayan de Oro, Philippines	
8	Win	7–1	Lyster Jun Pronco	UD	8	3 May 2014	Waterfront Hotel and Casino, Cebu City, Philippines	
7	Win	6–1	Ryan Ralozo	UD	10	19 Mar 2014	Municipal gym, Dumingag, Philippines	
6	Win	5–1	Louie Arlos	MD	8	26 Oct 2013	Makati Coliseum, Makati, Philippines	
5	Win	4–1	Rey Morano	RTD	4 (8), 3:00	8 Mar 2013	Calamba, Misamis Occidental, Philippines	
4	Loss	3–1	Ronelle Ferreras	MD	8	21 Sep 2012	Cuneta Astrodome, Pasay, Philippines	
3	Win	3–0	Nestor Languido	KO	1 (6), 2:59	18 Aug 2012	Aurora, Zamboanga del Sur, Philippines	
2	Win	2–0	Mateo Jasma	TKO	1 (6), 1:41	16 Jul 2012	Public Plaza, Baliangao, Philippines	
1	Win	1–0	Abel Gayhun	UD	6	28 Apr 2012	MSU-IIT Gym, Iligan, Philippines	

== IBA professional boxing record ==
1 fight	0 wins	1 loss
By decision	0	1

No.	Result	Record	Opponent	Type	Round, time	Date	Location	Notes
1	Loss	0–1	Vasilii Egorov	UD	6	12 Jul 2024	IBA Coliseum, Serpukhov, Russia	

== Titles in boxing ==
=== Regional/International titles ===
- ABF mini-flyweight champion (105 lbs)
- WBO Oriental light-flyweight champion (108 lbs)
- MinProBA light-flyweight champion (108 lbs)
- GAB light-flyweight champion (108 lbs)
- PBF light-flyweight champion (108 lbs)
- WBC Asia super-flyweight champion (115 lbs)
