= Sergio Mendoza (boxer) =

Mexican boxer (born 2000)

Personal information
- Nickname: Yoreme
- Born: Sergio Alfonso Mendoza Cordova; March 28, 2000 (age 26) Hermosillo, Sonora, Mexico
- Height: 5 ft 8 in (173 cm)
- Weight: Light flyweight; Flyweight

Boxing career
- Reach: 67 1/2 in (171 cm)
- Stance: Southpaw

Boxing record
- Total fights: 29
- Wins: 28
- Win by KO: 24
- Losses: 1

Sergio Alfonso Mendoza Cordova (born March 28, 2000) is a Mexican professional boxer. He has held the unified World Boxing Council (WBC) and World Boxing Association (WBA) flyweight titles since October 2026.

== Professional boxing career ==
With a record of 27 wins from 27 professional fights including 23 knockouts, Mendoza challenged IBF light-flyweight champion Thanongsak Simsri at Korakuen Hall in Tokyo, Japan, on 13 April 2026. He lost by knockout in the second round.

Taking the fight on two weeks notice as a late replacement for the injured Oscar Collazo, Mendoza faced unified WBC and WBA flyweight champion Ricardo Sandoval at Wintrust Arena in Chicago, Illinois, United States, on 10 October 2026. He sent his opponent to the canvas twice in the second round and, after flooring him again in the fifth, the referee stepped in to stop the contest and award Mendoza the win, and the titles, by technical knockout.

== Professional boxing record ==
29 fights	28 wins	1 loss
By knockout	24	1
By decision	4	0

No.	Result	Record	Opponent	Type	Round, time	Date	Location	Notes
29	Win	28–1	Ricardo Sandoval	TKO	5 (12), 1:46	10 Oct 2026	Wintrust Arena, Chicago, Illinois, U.S.	Won WBA and WBC flyweight titles
28	Loss	27–1	Thanongsak Simsri	KO	2 (12), 2:32	13 Apr 2026	Korakuen Hall, Tokyo, Japan	For IBF light-flyweight title
27	Win	27–0	Mpumelelo Tshabalala	KO	3 (12), 2:49	22 Nov 2025	Hermosillo, Mexico	
26	Win	26–0	Joel Cordova	UD	10	4 Jul 2025	Ciudad Juárez, Mexico	
25	Win	25–0	Edinson Martinez	TKO	4 (10), 1:59	15 Mar 2025	Hermosillo, Mexico	
24	Win	24–0	Angel Ramos Serrano	KO	3 (10), 2:02	13 Sep 2024	Arena Sonora, Hermosillo, Mexico	
23	Win	23–0	Hugo Hernandez	TKO	3 (6), 1:13	22 Jun 2024	Hermosillo, Mexico	
22	Win	22–0	Jesus Valle Chon	TKO	1 (8), 1:21	22 Mar 2024	Culiacán, Mexico	
21	Win	21–0	Yoel Garcia Gonzalez	TKO	5 (10), 0:10	8 Dec 2023	Culiacán, Mexico	
20	Win	20–0	Erick Omar Lopez	SD	10	25 Aug 2023	El Domo del Code Jalisco, Guadalajara, Mexico	
19	Win	19–0	Jose Javier Torres Aispuro	TKO	6 (10), 1:24	12 May 2023	Polideportivo Juan S. Millan, Culiacán, Mexico	
18	Win	18–0	Joaquin Cruz Castillo	UD	10	17 Dec 2022	Gimnasio Juan Francisco Estrada, Hermosillo, Mexico	
17	Win	17–0	Francisco Gomez Sanchez	KO	6 (10), 1:00	22 Jul 2022	Arena Sonora, Hermosillo, Mexico	Won vacant WBC FECARBOX flyweight title
16	Win	16–0	Eduardo Heron Marquez Nunez	TKO	3 (8), 0:52	6 May 2022	Gimnasio Juan Francisco Estrada, Hermosillo, Mexico	
15	Win	15–0	Arturo Segundo Geronimo	KO	6 (10), 2:08	11 Dec 2021	Centro de Usos Múltiples, Hermosillo, Mexico	Won vacant WBC FECOMBOX flyweight title
14	Win	14–0	Jesus Fierro Verdugo	TKO	5 (8), 0:55	30 Oct 2021	Gimnasio Juan Francisco Estrada, Hermosillo, Mexico	
13	Win	13–0	Ulises Lara	TKO	5 (8), 1:07	4 Sep 2021	Gimnasio Juan Francisco Estrada, Hermosillo, Mexico	
12	Win	12–0	Rigo Omar Martinez Hernandez	KO	2 (6), 0:59	17 Jul 2021	Gimnasio Juan Francisco Estrada, Hermosillo, Mexico	
11	Win	11–0	Angel Guevara	UD	6	7 May 2021	Cancha 4, Hermosillo, Mexico	
10	Win	10–0	Reyes Lopez Escalante	TKO	1 (6), 1:47	26 Mar 2021	Jardines del Pedregal, Hermosillo, Mexico	
9	Win	9–0	Jose Luis Estrada Lazaro	TKO	6 (6), 2:04	9 Dec 2020	Marinaterra Hotel Spa, San Carlos, Mexico	
8	Win	8–0	Jesus Ochoa Canez	KO	4 (4), 1:01	29 Feb 2020	Gimnasio Juan Francisco Estrada, Hermosillo, Mexico	
7	Win	7–0	Abraham Manriquez Gonzalez	TKO	2 (4), 2:30	11 Oct 2019	Auditorio Benito Juárez, Los Mochis, Mexico	
6	Win	6–0	Arcadio Salazar Chanez	TKO	3 (4), 1:42	6 Sep 2019	Gimnasio Solidaridad, Hermosillo, Mexico	
5	Win	5–0	German Aaron Cota	RTD	3 (4), 3:00	19 Jul 2019	Centro De Usos Múltiples, Huatabampo, Mexico	
4	Win	4–0	Armando Alcantar	TKO	1 (4), 0:51	16 Jun 2019	Gimnasio Municipal, Guaymas, Mexico	
3	Win	3–0	Jonathan Garate	TKO	1 (4), 1:01	1 Jun 2019	Gimnasio Solidaridad, Hermosillo, Mexico	
2	Win	2–0	Rigoberto Cabreros	TKO	2 (4), 2:12	25 Jan 2019	Gimnasio Solidaridad, Hermosillo, Mexico	
1	Win	1–0	Brayan Pacheco Solorio	TKO	2 (4), 1:10	21 Dec 2018	Gimnasio José Luis Castillo, Empalme, Mexico	
