= Katie Taylor vs. Amanda Serrano =

2022 boxing match

For History
- The official poster for Taylor vs Serrano
- Date: April 30, 2022
- Venue: Madison Square Garden, New York City, New York, U.S.
- Title(s) on the line: WBA, WBC, IBF, WBO, and The Ring lightweight titles

Tale of the tape
Boxer	Katie Taylor	Amanda Serrano
Nickname	KT	The Real Deal
Hometown	Bray, County Wicklow, Ireland	Carolina, Puerto Rico
Pre-fight record	20–0 (6 KO)	42–1–1 (30 KO)
Age	35 years, 9 months	33 years, 6 months
Height	5 ft 5 in (165 cm)	5 ft 5 1/2 in (166 cm)
Weight	134.6 lb (61 kg)	133.6 lb (61 kg)
Style	Orthodox	Southpaw
Recognition	WBA, WBC, IBF, WBO, and The Ring lightweight champion The Ring No. 1 ranked pound-for-pound fighter 2-division world champion	WBC and WBO featherweight champion The Ring No. 3 ranked pound-for-pound fighter 7-division world champion

Result
- Taylor wins via 10-round split decision (94-96, 97-93, 96-93)

Katie Taylor vs. Amanda Serrano, billed as For History, was a women's lightweight professional boxing match contested between the undisputed lightweight world champion Katie Taylor and seven-division world champion Amanda Serrano. The bout was held on April 30, 2022, at Madison Square Garden in New York City, with Taylor's undisputed lightweight titles on the line.

It was the first women's boxing match to headline Madison Square Garden, and was described as the 'biggest women's fight of all time'. Taylor defeated Serrano by split decision. Considered one of the greatest fights to ever take place at Madison Square Garden, the bout received universal acclaim, being named Fight of the Year by Sports Illustrated and Event of the Year by The Ring.

== Background ==
Katie Taylor made her professional debut in November 2016 following a decorated amateur career that included a gold medal at the 2012 Olympic Games. At that time, Amanda Serrano was already a four-weight world champion with a record of 30–1–1. Over the next three years, both women would see continued success. Serrano earned titles in three more weight classes to become a seven-weight world champion, the second most of any boxer in history, only behind Manny Pacquiao. She also began a career in mixed martial arts, compiling a professional record of 2–0–1. Meanwhile, Taylor would become a world champion within a year of her debut, and eventually claimed all four divisional titles to become the undisputed lightweight champion. She then became a two-weight champion by defeating Christina Linardatou at super-lightweight.

The two were first scheduled to fight each other at the Manchester Arena on May 2, 2020, which would have been the first defence for Taylor as undisputed lightweight champion. However, due to the COVID-19 pandemic, the bout was postponed and rescheduled to July 4, with the venue changing to the Matchroom Sport headquarters in Brentwood, Essex. After being postponed for a second time, Taylor’s promoter Eddie Hearn revealed he was in talks to secure a rematch between Taylor and Delfine Persoon, who Taylor had narrowly beaten to become the undisputed lightweight champion on the undercard of Anthony Joshua vs. Andy Ruiz Jr. On July 9, it was confirmed that the Taylor vs. Persoon rematch would take place on August 22 on the undercard of Dillian Whyte vs. Alexander Povetkin. Taylor won the fight by unanimous decision. In the 16 months that followed, Taylor and Serrano won four fights each, taking their respective records to 20–0 and 42–1–1.

On January 27, 2022, the bout was officially announced to be taking place on April 30, 2022 at Madison Square Garden. The fight was co-promoted by Hearn's Matchroom Boxing and Jake Paul's Most Valuable Promotions, who are the respective promoters of Taylor and Serrano, and was broadcast live on DAZN. Following the official announcement of the fight, press conferences were held in New York City and London to promote the bout.

During the London press conference, Serrano, citing the historic nature of the contest, suggested that the fight be 12 three-minute rounds, as is the case in men's world championship boxing, rather than the women's standard of 10 two-minute rounds. Taylor dismissed this idea, saying ”I don't think it will make a huge difference to the event; it's already iconic as it is.”

Taylor already held a victory over Amanda's sister Cindy, having defeated her by unanimous decision in October 2018.

== Weigh-in ==
The weigh-in took place at The Theater at Madison Square Garden and was heavily attended by fans from Ireland and Puerto Rico. As part of a promotional agreement with WWE, Serrano was announced to the stage by the WWE Women's Champion Bianca Belair, while Taylor was introduced by her compatriot Becky Lynch.

Both fighters weighed in under the 135-pound lightweight limit, with Serrano at 133.6 pounds and Taylor at 134.6 pounds.

== Fight card ==
Weight Class		vs.		Method	Round	Time	Notes
Lightweight	(Republic of Ireland) Katie Taylor (c)	def.	(Puerto Rico) Amanda Serrano	SD	10/10		^{Note 1}
Super Welterweight	(United Kingdom) Liam Smith	def.	(United States) Jessie Vargas	TKO	10/12	0:41
Super Middleweight	(United States) Franchón Crews-Dezurn (c)	def.	(Sweden) Elin Cederroos (c)	UD	10/10		^{Note 2}
Flyweight	(United Kingdom) Galal Yafai (c)	def.	(United States) Miguel Cartagena	RTD	2/10	3:00	^{Note 3}
Middleweight	(United States) Austin Williams	def.	(United States) Chordale Booker	TKO	1/10	2:25	^{Note 4}
Super Lightweight	(United States) Reshat Mati	def.	(United States) Joe Eli Hernandez	UD	8/8
Featherweight	(Australia) Skye Nicolson	def.	(United States) Shanecqua Paisley Davis	UD	6/6
Light Heavyweight	(United States) Khalil Cole	def.	(United States) William Langston	UD	6/6

^Note 1 For WBA, WBC, IBF, WBO, and The Ring Lightweight titles
^Note 2 For WBA, WBC, IBF and WBO Super Middleweight titles
^Note 3 For WBC International Flyweight title
^Note 4 For vacant WBA Continental Americas Middleweight Title

== Rematches ==
Following Serrano becoming the undisputed featherweight champion with a victory over Erika Cruz, the rematch was set to take place on May 20, 2023 at the 3Arena in Dublin. However, in late February it was announced that Serrano would not be able to make the date due to damage suffered in the fight with Cruz. She was replaced by undisputed light-welterweight champion Chantelle Cameron.

On April 16, 2024, Netflix announced that the rematch would take place on July 20 for the undisputed super-lightweight title, as the co-feature bout to Jake Paul vs. Mike Tyson. The event would end up being rescheduled to take place on November 15, 2024 after Mike Tyson suffered an ulcer flare-up. Taylor won the fight 95–94 on all three scorecards.

On March 6, 2025, the trilogy fight was announced, again for the undisputed super-lightweight title, and took place at Madison Square Garden on July 11, 2025. The bout headlined an all women's card live on Netflix, promoted by Most Valuable Promotions, with Taylor winning by majority decision.

Preceded by vs. Firuza Sharipova	Katie Taylor's bouts 30 April 2022	Succeeded by vs. Karen Carabajal
Preceded by vs. Miriam Gutiérrez	Amanda Serrano's bouts 30 April 2022	Succeeded by vs. Sarah Mahfoud
Awards
Previous: Anthony Joshua vs. Oleksandr Usyk	The Ring Event of the Year; 2022	Next: Day of Reckoning
