= Regie Suganob =

Filipino boxer (born 1997

Personal information
- Nickname: Filipino Phenom
- Nationality: Filipino
- Born: 24 November 1997 (age 28) Dauis, Bohol, Philippines
- Height: 1.65 m (5 ft 5 in)
- Weight: Light flyweight

Boxing career
- Stance: Orthodox

Boxing record
- Total fights: 20
- Wins: 19
- Win by KO: 8
- Losses: 1

Regie "Filipino Phenom" Suganob (born 24 November 1997) is a Filipino professional boxer who challenged for the IBF junior flyweight title in 2023.

== Professional career ==
=== Early years ===
Suganob would make his debut against fellow debutant, Mark Torella, where his prevails with a second-round technical knockout, he would later compose a record of 11–0 with wins against prospects like John Paul Gabunilas and Jake Amparo before fighting with undefeated
(19–0–1) world-ranked Indonesian Andika D'Golden Boy whom he would defeat via unanimous decision.

=== Suganob vs. Vicelles ===
After 12 consecutive victories, Suganob was faced against Mark Vicelles in an IBF World light flyweight title eliminator on February 25, 2023. In the fourth round, Vicelles goes down once, in the sixth round an accidental headbutt occurred causing a huge cut on Vicelles' right eyebrow, in the 8th round, the referee, Danrex Tapdasan looked for the doctor due to Vicelles' cut getting worse as time goes by, making this go to the scorecards (Technical decision), where the judges scored:80-71, 78-73 and 77-74 all in favor of Regie Suganob.

=== Suganob vs. Nontshinga ===
Suganob was initially booked to fight the IBF light flyweight champion, Sivenathi Nontshinga, at East London, Eastern Cape, South Africa on June 16, 2023, but later it was postponed and moved to July 2, 2023. It was set as a 12 rounder match for the IBF light flyweight title, in the 1st Round, Suganob was downed in the late goings of the round, after 12 rounds, Nontshinga won the fight via unanimous decision, with the scores of 116-111(x2) and 117–110.

Five months after the bout against Nontshinga, Suganob faced World-rated Venezuelan boxer, Ronald Chacon for the vacant WBO Global light flyweight title in Tagbilaran, Philippines, Suganob won the bout via lop-sided unanimous decision, even getting to knock Chacon down in the fourth round.

=== Suganob vs. Ishizawa ===
On March 8, 2024, the duel between Suganob and world-ranked Kai Ishizawa is set on April 30, 2024, taking place at Tagbilaran City as the main event of the Kumong Bol-anon XV event for Suganob's WBO Global title, Ishizawa who recently came from a loss from fellow high-ranked and compatriot of Suganob, Vince Paras, is determined to take revenge against the Filipinos and bows to stop Suganob, Suganob, seeing his compatriots bow down many times to Japanese boxers on Japanese soil wants to change the narrative as he fights Ishizawa in Philippine soil, determined to prevail.
A bloodied Suganob put on a masterful performance in front of his Bohol fans as he knocks Ishizawa down two times en route to an eight-round technical knockout despite suffering a cut on his forehead since round one, due to the severity of the punches received from Suganob, Ishizawa was carried on a stretcher for further medical attention.

== Professional boxing record ==
20 fights	19 wins	1 loss
By knockout	8	0
By decision	11	1

No.	Result	Record	Opponent	Type	Round, time	Date	Location	Notes
20	Win	19–1	Sivenathi Nontshinga	KO	5 (12), 2:54	12 Sep 2026	Bohol Wisdom School Gym, Tagbilaran, Philippines	
19	Win	18–1	Siphamandla Baleni	TKO	8 (10), 0:39	28 Feb 2026	Bohol Cultural Center, Tagbilaran, Philippines	
18	Win	17–1	Mchanja Yohana	UD	10	22 Nov 2025	PMI Main Campus Gymnasium, Tagbilaran, Philippines	
17	Win	16–1	Nanthanon Thongchai	TKO	3 (10), 0:15	21 Dec 2024	Holy Name University Gymnasium, Tagbilaran, Philippines	
16	Win	15–1	Kai Ishizawa	TKO	8 (12), 2:38	30 Apr 2024	Holy Name University Gymnasium, Tagbilaran, Philippines	Retained WBO Global light-flyweight title
15	Win	14–1	Ronald Chacon	UD	12	4 Nov 2023	Bohol Wisdom School Gym, Tagbilaran, Philippines	Won vacant WBO Global light-flyweight title
14	Loss	13–1	Sivenathi Nontshinga	UD	12	2 Jul 2023	International Convention Centre, East London, South Africa	For IBF light-flyweight title
13	Win	13–0	Mark Vicelles	TD	8 (12), 1:39	25 Feb 2023	Calape Cultural Center, Calape, Philippines	Unanimous TD after Vicelles is cut on his right eyebrow caused by an accidental headbutt
12	Win	12–0	Andika D'Golden Boy	UD	10	9 Sep 2022	Dimiao, Bohol, Philippines	
11	Win	11–0	Asyer Aluman	KO	1 (10), 2:38	23 Jul 2022	Barangay Cogon Gym, Tagbilaran, Philippines	
10	Win	10–0	Ricardo Sueno	UD	10	7 Mar 2022	Dauis Gym, Dauis, Philippines	
9	Win	9–0	Jerome Baloro	UD	10	10 Dec 2021	Poblacion, Dauis, Philippines	Won vacant IBF Youth light-flyweight title
8	Win	8–0	Jake Amparo	UD	8	27 Sep 2021	Tagbilaran, Bohol, Philippines	
7	Win	7–0	MJ Bo	RTD	1 (8), 3:00	3 Jul 2021	IPI Tingub Gym, Mandaue, Philippines	
6	Win	6–0	Paolo Sy	TKO	3 (8)	27 Mar 2021	IPI Compound, Mandaue, Philippines	
5	Win	5–0	Robert Ates	UD	6	18 Dec 2020	IPI Compound, Mandaue, Philippines	
4	Win	4–0	Rolly Dorong	UD	6	14 Dec 2019	Bogo City Sports & Coltural Complex, Bogo, Philippines	
3	Win	3–0	John Paul Gabunilas	UD	6	23 Sep 2019	PMI Colleges Bohol, Tagbilaran, Philippines	
2	Win	2–0	Kier Torregosa	UD	4	26 Jul 2019	Passi, Iloilo, Philippines	
1	Win	1–0	Mark Torella	TKO	2 (4), 0:55	24 Nov 2018	IEC Convention Center, Cebu City, Philippines	
