= Denver Cuello =

Filipino boxer

Personal information
- Nickname: The Excitement
- Nationality: Filipino
- Born: 12 December 1986 (age 39) Cabatuan, Iloilo, Philippines
- Height: 5 ft 3 in (160 cm)
- Weight: Mini-flyweight; Light-flyweight; Bantamweight

Boxing career
- Reach: 64 in (163 cm)
- Stance: Southpaw

Boxing record
- Total fights: 50
- Wins: 38
- Win by KO: 26
- Losses: 6
- Draws: 6

Denver Cuello (born 12 December 1986) is a Filipino boxing promoter and a professional boxer who challenged for the WBC strawweight title in 2013.

== Professional career ==
Cuello made his professional debut on September 26, 2004, against Marlon Villanueva. The bout took place at the Taytay Gym in Taytay, Rizal and ended in a technical draw early in the fight.

He won the vacant WBC International minimumweight title on April 19, 2009, defeating Japanese boxer Hiroshi Matsumoto via technical knockout in the 4th round. The bout was held at the Smart Araneta Coliseum in Quezon City, Metro Manila, Philippines. He later took on Ruslee Samoh in a non-title bout and won by unanimous decision. Cuello defended his title for the first time on November 27, 2009, against Mating Kilakil at the Ynares Plaza Gymnasium in Binangonan, Rizal, Philippines. The defending champion won the fight by technical knockout, again in round 4.

He was scheduled to fight Juan Hernandez from Mexico for the interim WBC minimumweight title on March 27, 2010. The match would be held in Monterrey, Nuevo León, Mexico. However the bout was postponed after the Mexican opponent collapsed in the gym and confined in a hospital. Cuello's manager, Aljoe Jaro, said he'll arrange a tune-up fight for his boxer the fight is delayed over a month.

On March 26, 2011, Cuello defended his WBC championship belt against Samat Chaiyong from Thailand at the Angono Gym in Angono, Rizal. He stopped the Thai challenger via a TKO on the 9th round with the referee stopping the match with still one minute and 12 seconds left in the round. The win improved Cuello's record to 26 wins (with 16 coming by way of knockout) against four losses and six draws.

== Professional boxing record ==
38 Wins (26 knockouts, 12 decisions), 6 Losses (2 knockouts, 4 decisions), 6 Draws
| Res. | Record | Opponent | Type | Round, Time | Date | Location | Notes |
| Loss | 38-6-6 | (Philippines) Jesse Espinas | UD | 10 | 2019-10-12 | (Philippines) Elorde Sports Complex, Parañaque, Metro Manila | |
| Win | 38-5-6 | (Thailand) Detnarong Omkrathok | RTD | 2 (10), 3:00 | 2019-08-03 | (Philippines) Barangay Vergara Covered Court, Mandaluyong, Metro Manila | Retained ABF bantamweight title |
| Win | 37-5-6 | (Indonesia) Jack Amisa | TKO | 2 (10), 2:15 | 2019-03-08 | (Philippines) Angono Sports Complex, Angono, Rizal | Won vacant ABF bantamweight title |
| Win | 36-5-6 | (Indonesia) Boy Tanto | TKO | 3 (10), 2:39 | 2015-06-27 | (Thailand) Indoor Stadium Huamark, Bangkok | |
| Win | 35-5-6 | (Indonesia) Ardi Tefa | TKO | 3 (10), 2:39 | 2014-11-30 | (Philippines) Angono Sports Complex, Angono, Rizal | |
| Win | 34-5-6 | (Thailand) Jaipetch Chaiyonggym | RTD | 7 (10), 3:00 | 2014-10-11 | (Philippines) Recreation Center, Davao City, Davao del Sur | |
| Loss | 33-5-6 | (China) Xiong Zhao Zhong | MD | 12 | 2013-06-28 | (United Arab Emirates) World Trade Centre, Dubai | For WBC strawweight title |
| Win | 33-4-6 | (Japan) Takashi Kunishige | MD | 10 | 2013-04-07 | (Japan) Bodymaker Colosseum, Osaka | |
| Win | 32-4-6 | (Mexico) Ivan Meneses | UD | 10 | 2012-09-29 | (Mexico) Auditorio del Bicentenario, Morelia, Michoacán | |
| Win | 31-4-6 | (Mexico) Ganigan Lopez | TKO | 2 (12), 2:37 | 2012-05-19 | (Mexico) Palenque de la Feria, Celaya, Guanajuato | Retained WBC Silver strawweight title |
| Win | 30-4-6 | (Indonesia) Kid Suryana | TKO | 4 (10), 1:48 | 2012-03-10 | (Philippines) Jaro Plaza Gym, Iloilo City, Iloilo | |
| Win | 29-4-6 | (Mexico) Carlos Perez | TKO | 1 (12), 1:37 | 2011-10-15 | (Mexico) Centro Internacional de Convenciones, Chetumal, Quintana Roo | Won vacant WBC Silver strawweight title |
| Win | 28-4-6 | (Mexico) Sebastian Arcos | KO | 3 (6), 2:24 | 2011-09-24 | (Mexico) Centro de Convenciones, Cozumel, Quintana Roo | |
| Win | 27-4-6 | (Puerto Rico) Omar Soto | TKO | 2 (8) | 2011-07-16 | (United States) Blaisdell Center, Honolulu, Hawaii | |
| Win | 26-4-6 | (Thailand) Wittawas Basapean | TKO | 9 (12), 1:12 | 2011-03-26 | (Philippines) Ynares Gym, Angono, Rizal | Retained WBC International strawweight title |
| Win | 25-4-6 | (Thailand) Kongkrai Kiatpracha | TKO | 1 (10), 2:08 | 2010-11-05 | (Philippines) Ynares Sports Arena, Pasig, Metro Manila | |
| Win | 24-4-6 | (Indonesia) Muhammad Rachman | TKO | 9 (12), 1:03 | 2010-09-25 | (Philippines) MSU IIT Gym, Iligan, Lanao del Norte | Won WBC International strawweight title |
| Win | 23-4-6 | (Philippines) Arnel Tadena | TKO | 4 (10), 2:42 | 2010-08-01 | (Philippines) PAGCOR Hotel and Casino, Bacolod, Negros Occidental | |
| Win | 22-4-6 | (Philippines) Nelson Llanos | KO | 7 (10), 2:35 | 2010-07-02 | (Philippines) Angono Municipal Gym, Angono, Rizal | |
| Loss | 21-4-6 | (Mexico) Juan Hernandez | DQ | 3 (12) | 2010-05-22 | Auditorio Plaza Condesa, Mexico City | |
| Win | 21-3-6 | (Philippines) Samuel Apuya | TKO | 1 (10), 0:52 | 2010-01-23 | (Philippines) Cuneta Astrodome, Pasay, Metro Manila | |
| Win | 20-3-6 | (Philippines) Mating Kilakil | TKO | 4 (12), 1:26 | 2009-11-27 | (Philippines) Ynares Plaza Gymnasium, Binangonan, Rizal | Retained WBC International strawweight title |
| Win | 19-3-6 | (Thailand) Rusalee Samor | UD | 8 | 2009-09-18 | (Thailand) Petchakasem University, Bangkok | |
| Win | 18-3-6 | (Japan) Hiroshi Matsumoto | TKO | 4 (12), 0:43 | 2009-04-19 | (Philippines) Smart Araneta Coliseum, Quezon City, Metro Manila | Won vacant WBC International strawweight title |
| Win | 17-3-6 | (Indonesia) Yanus Emaury | RTD | 2 (12), 3:00 | 2009-01-11 | (Philippines) Smart Araneta Coliseum, Quezon City, Metro Manila | |
| Win | 16-3-6 | (Philippines) Benjie Sorolla | TKO | 2 (10), 3:00 | 2008-11-30 | (Philippines) Mandaue City Sports and Cultural Complex, Mandaue, Cebu | |
| Win | 15-3-6 | (Philippines) Michael Landero | UD | 10 | 2008-08-29 | (Philippines) Ynares Plaza Gymnasium, Binangonan, Rizal | |
| Draw | 14-3-6 | (Philippines) Armando dela Cruz | TD | 3 (12), 2:31 | 2008-02-09 | (Philippines) Mindanao Civic Center Gymnasium, Tubod, Lanao del Norte | Retained Philippines Games & Amusement Board (GAB) strawweight title |
| Win | 14-3-5 | (Philippines) Dennis Juntillano | TKO | 4 (12), 2:48 | 2008-01-19 | (Philippines) Midsayap, Cotabato | |
| Draw | 13-3-5 | (Philippines) Rollen Del Castillo | TD | 3 (12), 1:34 | 2007-10-28 | (Philippines) Thunderbird Resort and Casino, Binangonan, Rizal | Retained Philippines Games & Amusement Board (GAB) strawweight title |
| Win | 13-3-4 | (Philippines) Armando dela Cruz | UD | 12 | 2007-07-07 | (Philippines) Ynares Plaza Gymnasium, Binangonan, Rizal | Won vacant Philippines Games & Amusement Board (GAB) strawweight title |
| Win | 12-3-4 | (Philippines) Fabio Marfa | TKO | 2 (10), 1:52 | 2007-06-01 | (Philippines) Angono Municipal Gym, Angono, Rizal | |
| Win | 11-3-4 | (Philippines) Carlos Besares | TKO | 1 (10), 1:18 | 2007-04-29 | (Philippines) Plaza Rajah Sulayman, Manila, Metro Manila | |
| Win | 10-3-4 | (Philippines) Steve Demaisip | KO | 3 (10), 0:24 | 2007-02-17 | (Philippines) San Juan Gym, Taytay, Rizal | |
| Win | 9-3-4 | (Philippines) Arnel Tadena | UD | 10 | 2006-12-15 | (Philippines) Barangay Bagong Pag-asa (Brgy. Project 6), Quezon City, Metro Manila | |
| Win | 8-3-4 | (Philippines) Rommel Bongon | UD | 10 | 2006-09-13 | (Philippines) Barangay Dolores (Poblacion), Taytay, Rizal | |
| Loss | 7-3-4 | (Philippines) Rey Migreno | TKO | 2 (8), 1:45 | 2006-06-26 | (Philippines) Salceda Sports Complex, Polangui, Albay | |
| Win | 7-2-4 | (Philippines) Michael Rodriguez | UD | 10 | 2006-04-23 | (Philippines) Cantada Gym, Taguig, Metro Manila | |
| Win | 6-2-4 | (Philippines) Pit Anacaya | MD | 8 | 2006-01-21 | (Philippines) Ynares Sr. Memorial Gym, Binangonan, Rizal | |
| Win | 5-2-4 | (Philippines) Abdul Simo | TKO | 6 (8) | 2006-01-07 | (Philippines) Provincial Capitol Grounds, Cagayan de Oro, Misamis Oriental | |
| Win | 4-2-4 | (Philippines) Mark Daguno | TKO | 2 (6), 1:11 | 2005-11-07 | (Philippines) Joe Cantada Sports Center, Taguig, Metro Manila | |
| Draw | 3-2-4 | (Philippines) Pit Anacaya | MD | 4 | 2005-09-24 | (Philippines) San Andres Gym, Manila, Metro Manila | |
| Loss | 3-2-3 | (Philippines) Tommy Terado | TKO | 4 (8) | 2005-07-24 | (Philippines) South Cotabato Gym, Koronadal, Cotabato | |
| Win | 3-1-3 | (Philippines) Pit Anacaya | UD | 6 | 2005-06-25 | (Philippines) Joe Cantada Sports Center, Taguig, Metro Manila | |
| Draw | 2-1-3 | (Philippines) Archie Mijeyes | TD | 1 (6) | 2005-04-09 | (Philippines) Angono Auditorium, Angono, Rizal | |
| Draw | 2-1-2 | (Philippines) Reymund Legaspi | TD | 1 (6) | 2005-01-03 | (Philippines) Pelaéz Sports Complex, Cagayan de Oro, Misamis Oriental | |
| Win | 2-1-1 | (Philippines) Janry Canete | UD | 4 | 2004-12-10 | (Philippines) Elorde Sports Center, Parañaque, Metro Manila | |
| Win | 1-1-1 | (Philippines) Richard Ignacio | UD | 4 | 2004-10-21 | (Philippines) Joe Cantada Boxing Arena, Taguig, Metro Manila | |
| Draw | 0-1-1 | (Philippines) Marlon Villanueva | TD | 4 (4) | 2004-09-26 | (Philippines) Taytay Gym, Taytay, Rizal | |
| Loss | 0-1 | (Philippines) Pit Anacaya | SD | 4 | 2004-08-28 | (Philippines) Angono Municipal Gym, Angono, Rizal | |
