= Sivenathi Nontshinga =

South African boxer (born 1998)

Personal information
- Nickname: The Special One
- Born: 3 December 1998 (age 27) Newlands, Eastern Cape, South Africa
- Height: 5 ft 5 in (165 cm)
- Weight: Light flyweight

Boxing career
- Reach: 67 in (170 cm)
- Stance: Orthodox

Boxing record
- Total fights: 17
- Wins: 14
- Win by KO: 11
- Losses: 3

Sivenathi Nontshinga (born 3 December 1998) is a South African professional boxer. He is a two-time IBF light-flyweight world champion, having held the belt from 2022 to November 2023 in his first reign, and from February 2024 to October 2024 in his second reign. He has previously held the IBF International light-flyweight title from 2019 to 2022. Also a former African light-flyweight champion, he is ranked as the world's fifth-best active light-flyweight by BoxRec and the seventh-best by the IBF.

== Early life ==
Nontshinga was raised in Newlands, a "chicken farm community" located at the entrance to Mdantsane township in Eastern Cape. His father, Thembani Gopheni, is his trainer and his handler.

== Professional boxing career ==
=== Early career ===
Nontshinga made his professional debut on 30 July 2017 at the age of 18, defeating Sandile Wessels in a third-round finish in East London. After four stoppages in his first four fights, he was soon recognized as a promising teen sensation in South Africa. In only his fifth pro fight, he defeated Tisetso Modisadife for the vacant African light-flyweight title.

On 7 April 2019, he scored a first-round knockout over Adam Yahaya to win the vacant IBF International light-flyweight title in Port Elizabeth. In his first title defense, Nontshinga defeated compatriot Siyabonga Siyo, a fighter he idolised growing up. He finished Siyo with a barrage of blows in the ninth round to make it eighth stoppage wins in eighth fights. He retained his belt again on 8 March 2020 by defeating Ivan Soriano, ranked number 5 by the IBF, at the Orient Theatre in East London. Nontshinga suffered a swollen left eye early, but after knocking him down at the end of the fourth round, he dropped the veteran for good in the fifth with a right cross.

After more than a year without a fight due to the COVID-19 pandemic, Nontshinga defeated Filipino prospect Christian Araneta in an IBF title eliminator in Port Elizabeth on 24 April 2021. Although he was knocked down in the 12th round, he was favored unanimously on the judges' scorecards (115–112, 114–113, 114–113).

=== IBF light flyweight champion ===
==== Nontshinga vs. Flores ====
Nontshinga faced the undefeated Hector Flores for the vacant IBF light flyweight title on 3 September 2022, following a seventeen-month absence from the sport, at the Centro de Usos Múltiples in Hermosillo, Mexico and was as such his first fight outside of his native South Africa. The bout was scheduled for the undercard of the Juan Francisco Estrada and Argi Cortes super flyweight title bout. Nontshinga won the fight by split decision. Two of the judges scored the fight 116–111 and 114–113 in his favor, while the third judge scored it 115–112 for Flores. Nontshinga scored the sole knockdown of the fight in the second round, as he floored his opponent with a right hook which looped around the guard. The newly crowned Nontshinga signed a promotional deal with Matchroom Boxing four days after capturing the vacant belt. The championship bout was later awarded "Fight of the Year" honors by the IBF.

==== Nontshinga vs. Suganob ====
On February 28, 2023, Nontshinga was ordered by the IBF to make a mandatory title defense against Regie Suganob. The title fight was booked to take place on June 16, 2023, at the International Convention Centre in East London, South Africa. The event organizers, Rumble Africa Promotions, later postponed the event to July 2 to allow SABC Sport to setup TV coverage. Nontshinga won the fight by unanimous decision, with two scorecards of 116–112 and one scorecard of 117–110 in his favor.

==== Nontshinga vs. Curiel I & II ====
Eddie Hearn’s Matchroom Boxing confirmed on September 11, 2023, that Nontshinga would make a voluntary title defense against the #11 ranked IBF light-flyweight contender Adrian Curiel. The fight took place at the Casino de Monte Carlo Salle Medecin in Monte Carlo, Monaco on November 4, 2023, as the co-main event to the IBF super-featherweight title bout between Joe Cordina and Edward Vazquez. Nontshinga lost the fight by an upset second-round knockout. An immediate rematch was booked for February 16, 2024, and took place in Oaxaca City, Mexico. Nontshinga reclaimed the title by a tenth-round technical knockout. He knocked Curiel down 44 seconds into the tenth round, before forcing the referee to wave the fight off with a flurry of punches on a cornered and unresponsive Curiel.

==== Nontshinga vs. Yabuki ====
Nontshinga lost the title in his first defense against Masamichi Yabuki, going down to a ninth round technical knockout defeat at Aichi Sky Expo in Tokoname, Japan, on 12 October 2024.

== Professional boxing record ==
17 fights	14 wins	3 losses
By knockout	11	3
By decision	3	0

No.	Result	Record	Opponent	Type	Round, time	Date	Location	Notes
17	Loss	14–3	Regie Suganob	KO	5 (12), 2:54	12 Sep 2026	Bohol Wisdom School Gym, Tagbilaran, Philippines	
16	Win	14–2	Sunday Kiwale	KO	2 (8)	15 Nov 2025	Box Camp Booysens, Johannesburg, South Africa	
15	Loss	13–2	Masamichi Yabuki	TKO	9 (12), 1:50	12 Oct 2024	Aichi Sky Expo, Tokoname, Japan	Lost IBF light-flyweight title
14	Win	13–1	Adrian Curiel	TKO	10 (12), 0:44	16 Feb 2024	Auditorio Guelaguetza, Oaxaca City, Mexico	Won IBF light-flyweight title
13	Loss	12–1	Adrian Curiel	KO	2 (12), 1:09	4 Nov 2023	Casino de Monte Carlo Salle Medecin, Monte Carlo, Monaco	Lost IBF light-flyweight title
12	Win	12–0	Regie Suganob	UD	12	2 Jul 2023	International Convention Centre, East London, South Africa	Retained IBF light-flyweight title
11	Win	11–0	Hector Flores	SD	12	3 Sep 2022	Centro de Usos Múltiples, Hermosillo, Mexico	Won vacant IBF light-flyweight title
10	Win	10–0	Christian Araneta	UD	12	24 Apr 2021	Boardwalk Casino, Port Elizabeth, South Africa	
9	Win	9–0	Ivan Soriano	KO	5 (12)	8 Mar 2020	Orient Theatre, East London, South Africa	Retained IBF International light-flyweight title
8	Win	8–0	Siyabonga Siyo	TKO	9 (12), 1:48	28 Jul 2019	Orient Theatre, East London, South Africa	Retained IBF International light-flyweight title
7	Win	7–0	Adam Yahaya	KO	1 (12), 1:27	7 Apr 2019	Nangoza Jebe Hall, Port Elizabeth, South Africa	Won vacant IBF International light-flyweight title
6	Win	6–0	Muhsin Kizota	TKO	7 (8)	9 Dec 2018	Orient Theatre, East London, South Africa	
5	Win	5–0	Tisetso Modisadife	TKO	9 (12), 2:51	21 Oct 2018	Orient Theatre, East London, South Africa	Won vacant African light-flyweight title
4	Win	4–0	Nwabisile Cholani	TKO	5 (6)	29 Jul 2018	Orient Theatre, East London, South Africa	
3	Win	3–0	Lusizo Manzana	KO	3 (4)	8 Apr 2018	Orient Theatre, East London, South Africa	
2	Win	2–0	Sive Jongwana	TKO	2 (4)	10 Dec 2017	Orient Theatre, East London, South Africa	
1	Win	1–0	Sandile Wessels	TKO	3 (6)	30 Jul 2017	Orient Theatre, East London, South Africa	

== See also ==
- List of world light-flyweight boxing champions

Sporting positions
Regional boxing titles
Vacant Title last held by Michael Ebo Danquah	ABU Light flyweight champion 21 October 2018 – 7 April 2019; Vacated	Vacant
New title	IBF International light-flyweight champion 7 April 2019 – 3 September 2022; Won world title	Vacant
World boxing titles
Vacant Title last held by Felix Alvarado	IBF Light flyweight champion 3 September 2022 – 4 November 2023	Succeeded by Adrian Curiel
Preceded by Adrian Curiel	IBF Light flyweight champion 16 February 2024 – 12 October 2024	Succeeded by Masamichi Yabuki
