= Agustin Mauro Gauto =

Argentinian boxer (born 1997)

Personal information
- Nickname: El Avion
- Nationality: Argentinian
- Born: 31 December 1997 (age 28) Lanús, Argentina
- Height: 5 ft 4 in (163 cm)
- Weight: Light-flyweight

Boxing career
- Stance: Orthodox

Boxing record
- Total fights: 21
- Wins: 20
- Win by KO: 14
- Losses: 2

Agustin Mauro Gauto (born 31 December 1997) is an Argentinian professional boxer who held the WBO International light-flyweight title in 2019. As of December 2021, he is ranked as the world's eighth best active mini-flyweight by The Ring.

== Professional boxing career ==
Gauto made his professional debut against Mauro Ezequiel Quinteros on 16 September 2017, and won the fight by unanimous decision. He amassed a 7–0 record before being scheduled to fight for his first title, the vacant South American light flyweight title, against Nohel Arambulet on 8 June 2018. Arambulet retired from the bout at the end of the eight round. Gauto was scheduled to make his first title defense against Luis Golindano on 1 September 2018. He won the fight by a third-round knockout.

Gauto was scheduled to fight Jose Antonio Jimenez for the vacant WBO Latino light-flyweight title on 31 October 2018. He won the fight by a first-round technical knockout.

Gauto fought Jesus Cervantes Villanueva for the vacant IBF Youth light-flyweight title on 6 April 2019. He won the fight by a first-round knockout. Gauto was scheduled to defend his newly acquired title just three weeks later, on 27 April 2019, against Mauro Nicolas Liendro. He beat Liendro by a sixth-round knockout.

Gauto was scheduled to fight Jorge Luis Orozco for the vacant WBO International light-flyweight title on 28 September 2019. He won the fight by unanimous decision. Gauto made the first defense of his WBO International title against Kenny Cano on 16 November 2019, two months after winning it. He won the fight by a second-round knockout.

Gauto made the second defense of his WBO International light-flyweight title against Julio Mendoza on 29 February 2020. He won the fight by a second-round knockout. Gauto was next scheduled to face Juan Jose Jurado on 12 December 2020, in a 117 lbs catchweight bout. He won the fight by a first-round technical knockout.

Gauto was scheduled to face David Barreto on 13 November 2021, in his first fight outside of the American continents, as the bout was scheduled to take place in Duesseldorf, Germany. Barreto later withdrew from the fight due to a positive COVID-19 test, and was replaced by Jaba Memishishi. Gauto made quick work of Memishishi, stopping him by technical knockout in the first round. Gauto was next booked to face Miel Fajardo on 5 March 2022. The event was eventually postponed to 26 March. He lost the fight by a second-round knockout. It was the first loss of his professional career.

In his U.S. debut on 6 April 2024, in Las Vegas, Gauto was stopped by Galal Yafai in the eighth round.

== Professional boxing record ==
23 fights	21 wins	2 losses
By knockout	15	2
By decision	6	0

No.	Result	Record	Opponent	Type	Round, time	Date	Location	Notes
23	Loss	21–2	Galal Yafai	TKO	8 (10), 2:40	6 April 2024	Fontainebleau Las Vegas, Winchester, Nevada, U.S.	For WBC International flyweight title
22	Win	21–1	Ernesto Ramirez	TKO	3 (10)	12 January 2024	Biblioteca Popular Nicolas Avellaneda, Avellaneda, Argentina	
21	Win	20–1	Luis Guerrero	UD	10	8 April 2023	CClub Social y Deportivo El Porvenir, Quilmes, Argentina	
20	Win	19–1	Carlos Ruben Dario Ruiz	KO	1 (6)	8 April 2023	Club Atletico Lanus, Lanus, Argentina	
19	Win	18–1	Miguel Angel Canido	KO	2 (6)	28 February 2023	Polideportivo Vicente Polimeni, Las Heras, Argentina	
18	Loss	17–1	Miel Fajardo	KO	2 (8), 1:53	26 March 2022	Dubai, United Arab Emirates	
17	Win	17–0	Jaba Memishishi	TKO	1 (8), 2:30	13 November 2021	Classic Remise, Duesseldorf, Germany	
16	Win	16–0	Juan Jose Jurado	TKO	1 (10)	12 December 2020	Microestadio Municipal, Hurlingham, Argentina	
15	Win	15–0	Julio Mendoza	KO	2 (10)	29 February 2020	Club Atletico Lanus, Lanus, Argentina	Retained WBO International light-flyweight title.
14	Win	14–0	Kenny Cano	KO	2 (10)	16 November 2019	Estadio F.A.B., Buenos Aires, Argentina	Retained WBO International light-flyweight title.
13	Win	13–0	Jorge Luis Orozco	UD	10	28 September 2019	Club Ferro Carril, Concordia, Argentina	Won vacant WBO International light-flyweight title.
12	Win	12–0	Mauro Nicolas Liendro	KO	6 (10)	27 April 2019	Club Atletico Lanus, Lanus, Argentina	Retained IBF Youth light-flyweight title.
11	Win	11–0	Jesus Cervantes Villanueva	KO	1 (10), 2:20	6 April 2019	Arena Sonora, Hermosillo, Mexico	Won vacant IBF Youth light-flyweight title.
10	Win	10–0	Jose Antonio Jimenez	TKO	1 (10), 2:35	31 October 2018	Hotel El Panama, Panama City, Panama	Won vacant WBO Latino light-flyweight title.
9	Win	9–0	Luis Golindano	KO	3 (12)	1 September 2018	Estadio F.A.B., Buenos Aires, Argentina	Retained South American light-flyweight title.
8	Win	8–0	Nohel Arambulet	RTD	8 (12)	8 June 2018	Estadio F.A.B., Buenos Aires, Argentina	Won vacant South American light-flyweight title.
7	Win	7–0	Mauro Nicolas Liendro	KO	4 (8)	6 April 2018	Estadio José María Gatica, Villa Dominico, Argentina	
6	Win	6–0	Marcos Emilio Villafane	DQ	2 (6)	3 March 2018	Club Talleres, Arroyo Seco, Argentina	
5	Win	5–0	Giampier Quinones	KO	2 (6)	26 January 2018	Club Talleres, Arroyo Seco, Argentina	
4	Win	4–0	Rodrigo Espindola	KO	1 (6)	19 January 2018	Olimpico Football Club, Villa Gobernador Galvez, Argentina	
3	Win	3–0	Mauro Nicolas Liendro	UD	6	2 December 2017	Estadio F.A.B., Buenos Aires, Argentina	
2	Win	2–0	David Nunez	UD	4	21 October 2017	Palacio Peñarol, Montevideo, Uruguay	
1	Win	1–0	Mauro Ezequiel Quinteros	UD	4	16 September 2017	Polideportivo Municipal Luis Monti, Escobar, Argentina	
