= Thanongsak Simsri =

Thai boxer (born 2000)

Thanongsak Simsri ทนงศักดิ์ สิมศรี
Personal information
- Nickname: The Black Wolf
- Nationality: Thai
- Born: Thanongsak Simsri; June 17, 2000 (age 26) Sisaket, Thailand
- Height: 5 ft 3 1/2 in (161 cm)
- Weight: Light flyweight

Boxing career
- Reach: 64 1/2 in (164 cm)
- Stance: Orthodox

Boxing record
- Total fights: 42
- Wins: 41
- Win by KO: 36
- Losses: 1

Thanongsak Simsri (Thai: ทนงศักดิ์ สิมศรี, born 17 June 2000), also known by his ring name Petchkoson Greentsuda (เพชรโกศล กรีนสึดะ) is a Thai professional boxer who has held the International Boxing Federation (IBF) light-flyweight title since June 2025. He is Thailand's 50th world boxing champion and the third to hold this weight class title in this organization, following Muangchai Kittikasem in 1989 and Saman Sorjaturong in 1995.

== Early life ==
He was born in Sisaket province and began boxing Muay Thai at the age of 14, driven by passion for the martial art. At 19, he decided to move to Bangkok to seek new opportunities. Due to his precise and swift punching skills, he caught the attention of scouts, which led him to switch from Muay Thai to professional boxing.

== Professional career ==
=== Early career ===
Simsri made his debut on 20 June 2018 against fellow debutant Thanapong Saekoo in Samut Prakan, Simsri won via first-round TKO.

Simsri was scheduled against the reigning WBA and The Ring light-flyweight world champion Hiroto Kyoguchi for Kyoguchi's third title defense on 3 November 2020, Simsri was at the time the eleventh-ranked contender in the WBA light-flyweight rankings. On 2 November 2020, one day before the fight, Kyoguchi announced he was unable to fight, as both he and his coaches had contracted COVID-19.

==== Simsri vs. Yabuki ====
After composing a record of 24–0, on 10 September 2022, Simsri fought former WBC light-flyweight world champion Masamichi Yabuki in what was promoted as a world title prelude for Yabuki, the fight was scheduled for a catchweight of 50 kilograms. Simsri lost the bout via seventh-round technical knockout, Yabuki knocked his opponent down twice prior to the stoppage, in the second and sixth rounds.

=== OPBF light-flyweight champion ===
==== Simsri vs. Fajardo ====
On 13 April 2024, Simsri challenged the knockout-artist and reigning OPBF light-flyweight champion Miel Fajardo for Fajardo's first title defense, the bout was held in Edion Arena, Osaka, Japan, Simsri prevailed via unanimous decision, thereby becoming the new OPBF champion, Simsri was down once in the tenth round prior to the decision-announcing.

==== Simsri vs. Taniguchi ====
On 15 December 2024, Simsri made his third title defense against former WBO mini-flyweight world champion Masataka Taniguchi in Sumiyoshi Sports Center, Osaka, Simsri successfully defended the title via split decision.

=== IBF light-flyweight championship ===
==== Simsri vs. Araneta ====
As Masamichi Yabuki vacated the IBF light-flyweight world championship to campaign at the flyweight division, No. 1 IBF-ranked knockout artist Christian Araneta is set to face No. 2 ranked Simsri for the vacant IBF light-flyweight world championship. On 26 April 2025, it was confirmed that their bout was finalized and will take place on 19 June 2025 at the Ota City General Gymnasium in Tokyo, Japan. Simsri defeated Araneta via split decision to become new IBF light-flyweight world champion, Simsri was in control of the early stages but was dropped in the third-round by a counter left hand, Simsri stood up and quickly adjusted, and later controlled most of the bout to win decisively.

After winning the world championship, Simsri dedicated the title to his grandmother, who had died just two days earlier, shortly after he had celebrated his 25th birthday.

==== Simsri vs. Mendoza ====
On April 13, 2026 (Songkran Day in Thailand), at Korakuen Hall in Tokyo, he made his first title defense by defeating the 26-year-old world No. 1 IBF contender Sergio Mendoza of Mexico via TKO (referee stoppage) in the second round, after Mendoza had previously been knocked down and given an eight-count. The victory ended Mendoza's winning streak at just 26 fights, with the bout concluding much more quickly than expected.

==== Simsri vs. Vicelles ====
On September 26, 2026, Simsri defeated Mark Vicelles by 2nd round TKO to retain his IBF light flyweight title. Before the stoppage, he had twice sent the Filipino challenger to the canvas for eight counts, both times with straight right hands.

== Personal life ==
Although Simsri fights under the Japanese promoter Green Tsuda, which is based in Osaka, he lives and primarily trains in Thailand. He only travels to Japan when a fight is scheduled.

== Professional boxing record ==
42 fights	41 wins	1 loss
By knockout	36	0
By decision	5	1

No.	Result	Record	Opponent	Type	Round, time	Date	Location	Notes
42	Win	41–1	Mark Vicelles	TKO	2 (12), 2:05	26 Sep 2026	FujisanMesse, Fuji, Japan	Retained IBF light-flyweight title
41	Win	40–1	Sergio Mendoza	KO	2 (12), 2:32	13 Apr 2026	Korakuen Hall, Tokyo, Japan	Retained IBF light-flyweight title
40	Win	39–1	Christian Araneta	SD	12	19 Jun 2025	Ota City General Gymnasium, Tokyo, Japan	Won vacant IBF light-flyweight title
39	Win	38–1	Songchai Songklod	KO	3 (6), 0:35	22 Feb 2025	Singmanassak Muaythai School, Pathum Thani, Thailand	
38	Win	37–1	Masataka Taniguchi	SD	12	15 Dec 2024	Sumiyoshi SportsCenter, Osaka, Japan	Retained OPBF light-flyweight title
37	Win	36–1	Saravut Rongpig	TKO	2 (8), 0:40	5 Oct 2024	Singmanassak Muaythai School, Pathum Thani, Thailand	
36	Win	35–1	John Paul Gabunilas	TKO	5 (12), 2:52	4 Aug 2024	EDION Arena, Osaka, Japan	Retained OPBF light-flyweight title
35	Win	34–1	Assada Rakmit	KO	2 (6), 0:59	1 Jun 2024	Spaceplus Bangkok RCA, Bangkok, Thailand	
34	Win	33–1	Miel Fajardo	UD	12	13 Apr 2024	EDION Arena, Osaka, Japan	Won OPBF light-flyweight title
33	Win	32–1	Bordin Chomphoo	TKO	1 (8), 0:34	16 Dec 2023	Singmanassak Muaythai School, Pathum Thani, Thailand	
32	Win	31–1	Chiraphan Taosuwan	TKO	2 (8), 0:20	20 Oct 2023	Singmanassak Muaythai School, Pathum Thani, Thailand	
31	Win	30–1	Shota Asami	KO	2 (8), 2:20	6 Aug 2023	City Sogo Gym, Hirakata, Japan	
30	Win	29–1	Nawamin Klaypeayoon	TKO	1 (8), 0:52	18 Jun 2023	Singmanassak Muaythai School, Pathum Thani, Thailand	
29	Win	28–1	Oatsadin Thimthep	TKO	3 (6), 1:50	9 Apr 2023	Singmanassak Muaythai School, Pathum Thani, Thailand	
28	Win	27–1	Weerawat Thongchaichan	TKO	2 (6), 0:33	19 Feb 2023	Singmanassak Muaythai School, Pathum Thani, Thailand	
27	Win	26–1	Chiraphan Taosuwan	TKO	5 (8), 0:36	18 Dec 2022	Singmanassak Muaythai School, Pathum Thanu, Thailand	
26	Win	25–1	Sittipon Sangtean	TKO	3 (8), 1:08	20 Nov 2022	Singmanassak Muaythai School, Pathum Thani, Thailand	
25	Loss	24–1	Masamichi Yabuki	TKO	7 (10), 1:19	10 Sep 2022	City Gymnasium, Yokkaichi, Japan	
24	Win	24–0	Kris Sriphum	TKO	3 (8)	24 Jul 2022	Singmanassak Muaythai School, Pathum Thani, Thailand	
23	Win	23–0	Jaturong Yuenyong	TKO	2 (8), 1:18	1 May 2022	Singmanassak Muaythai School, Pathum Thani, Thailand	
22	Win	22–0	Benjaphon Phokam	TKO	2 (8), 1:20	27 Mar 2022	Singmanassak Muaythai School, Pathum Thani, Thailand	Won vacant ABF light-flyweight title
21	Win	21–0	Kampanart Valsiripattanachai	TKO	4 (6), 2:20	5 Feb 2022	Sasakul Gym, Pathum Thani, Thailand	
20	Win	20–0	Natthapon Buasa	TKO	2 (6), 2:30	19 Dec 2021	Singmanassak Muaythai School, Pathuk Thani, Thailand	
19	Win	19–0	Songkran Sosahwat	TKO	1 (8), 2:57	31 Oct 2021	Singmanassak Muaythai School, Pathum Thani, Thailand	
18	Win	18–0	Chanon Sonkham	KO	3 (8), 1:40	26 Sep 2021	Singmanassak Muaythai School, Pathum Thani, Thailand	
17	Win	17–0	Thaweesak Nakham	TKO	3 (8), 1:30	18 Jul 2021	Hamarith Muaythai, Sa Kaeo, Thailand	Retained Thai light-flyweight title
16	Win	16–0	Tongthep Taeyawong	RTD	4 (8), 3:00	6 Jun 2021	Singmanassak Muaythai School, Pathum Thani, Thailand	
15	Win	15–0	Nutthakorn Sungsevee	TKO	3 (6), 0:19	19 Mar 2021	Kiatkririn Fitness & Martial Art, Samut Prakan, Thailand	
14	Win	14–0	Suriya Puttaluksa	TKO	4 (6), 1:00	6 Feb 2020	Kiatkririn Fitness & Martial Art, Samut Prakan, Thailand	
13	Win	13–0	Christian Bacolod	UD	8	8 Dec 2019	EDION Arena, Osaka, Japan	
12	Win	12–0	Lerdchai Chaiyawed	UD	6	12 Oct 2019	Kiatkririn Fitness & Martial Art, Samut Prakan, Thailand	
11	Win	11–0	Nattee Thongsingcle	KO	3 (8), 1:17	31 Aug 2019	Kiatkririn Fitness & Martial Art, Samut Prakan, Thailand	Won vacant Thai light-flyweight title
10	Win	10–0	Mektison Marganti	KO	3 (8), 1:46	4 Aug 2019	EDION Arena, Osaka, Japan	
9	Win	9–0	Watcharaphon Chaisai	TKO	2 (8), 2:28	15 Jun 2019	Kiatkririn Fitness & Martial Art, Samut Prakan, Thailand	
8	Win	8–0	Panuwat Yakaret	TKO	1 (6), 1:32	19 May 2019	Kiatkririn Fitness & Martial Art, Samut Prakan, Thailand	
7	Win	7–0	Ricardo Sueno	TKO	1 (6), 1:06	21 Apr 2019	EDION Arena, Osaka, Japan	
6	Win	6–0	Kermoo	KO	1 (8)	5 Feb 2019	Prison & Correctional Facility, Bangkok, Thailand	
5	Win	5–0	Phirom Padanprasert	KO	5 (6)	14 Dec 2018	Maejo University, Chiang Mai, Thailand	
4	Win	4–0	Manop Audomphanawari	TKO	5 (6), 1:56	21 Nov 2018	Maetuenwittaya School, Lamphun, Thailand	
3	Win	3–0	Suriya Puttaluksa	TKO	2 (4), 0:59	12 Sep 2018	Municipality of Bangbuathong, Nonthaburi, Thailand	
2	Win	2–0	Prajak Butsree	TKO	2 (4), 2:02	2 Aug 2018	Ratirat Villege, Nonthaburi, Thailand	
1	Win	1–0	Thanapong Saekoo	TKO	1 (4), 1:50	20 Jun 2018	Chinese Taipei Association, Samut Prakan, Thailand	

== See also ==
- List of male boxers
- List of world light-flyweight boxing champions

Sporting positions
Regional boxing titles
Vacant Title last held by Wanchai Nianghansa	Thai light-flyweight champion August 31, 2019 – 2021; Vacated	Vacant Title next held by Phanuwit Chinpe
Vacant Title last held by John Michael Zulueta	ABF light-flyweight champion March 27, 2022 – 2022; Vacated	Vacant Title next held by John Michael Zulueta
Preceded by Miel Fajardo	OPBF light-flyweight champion April 13, 2024 – June 19, 2025; Won world title	Vacant Title next held by Masataka Taniguchi
World boxing titles
Vacant Title last held by Masamichi Yabuki	IBF light-flyweight champion June 19, 2025 – present	Incumbent
