= Miguel Cartagena =

Puerto Rican-American professional boxer

Personal information
- Nickname: No Fear
- Nationality: American
- Born: July 5, 1992 (age 34) Philadelphia, Pennsylvania
- Height: 5 ft 4 in (163 cm)
- Weight: Bantamweight

Boxing career
- Reach: 68 in (173 cm)
- Stance: Orthodox

Boxing record
- Total fights: 25
- Wins: 17
- Win by KO: 8
- Losses: 7
- Draws: 1
- No contests: 0

Miguel Cartagena (born July 5, 1992) is a Puerto Rican-American professional boxer.

== Amateur career ==
In 2009, a 16-year-old Cartagena won both the U.S. National Championship and the National Golden Gloves Championship. For his accomplishment, he was awarded the Pride of Philadelphia Award by the Philadelphia Sports Hall of Fame.

== Professional career ==
On March 26, 2011, Cartagena won his pro debut against Omar Gonzalez. The bout was held at the Boardwalk Hall in Atlantic City, New Jersey.

Cartagena fought for the WBC International flyweight title against Galal Yafai on 30 April 2022 on the undercard of the Katie Taylor vs. Amanda Serrano title unification bout. He lost via a second round corner retirement.

== Professional boxing record ==
25 fights	17 wins	7 losses
By knockout	8	4
By decision	9	3
Draws	1	

No.	Result	Record	Opponent	Type	Round, Time	Date	Location	Notes
25	Loss	17–7–1	Galal Yafai	RTD	2 (10) 3:00	2022-04-30	Madison Square Garden, New York, U.S.	For WBC International flyweight title
24	Win	17–6–1	Reyes Lopez Escalente	TKO	3 (6) 2:30	2021-06-12	La Terraza Sport Bar, Agua Prieta, Mexico	
23	Win	16–6–1	Arcadio Salazar Chanez	TKO	-(4) 1:29	2020-10-30	La Terraza Sport Bar, Agua Prieta, Mexico	
22	Loss	15–6–1	Jesus Soler	UD	8	2019-06-15	Parx Casino, Bensalem, U.S.	
21	Loss	15–5–1	Carlos Maldonado	SD	8	2018-06-29	Parx Casino, Bensalem, U.S.	
20	Loss	15–4–1	Brian Viloria	KO	5 (8) 0:44	2017-09-09	StubHub Center, Carson, U.S.	
19	Draw	15–3–1	Toshiyuki Igarashi	TD	3 (10) 0:49	2017-04-01	Korakuen Hall, Tokyo, Japan	
18	Win	15–3	Jobert Alvarez	TKO	1 (6) 2:16	2016-07-15	Kissimmee Civic Center, Kissimmee, U.S.	
17	Loss	14–3	Ricardo Rodriguez	UD	10	2016-02-26	Tony Rosa Community Center, Palm Bay, U.S.	For vacant WBO Latino super flyweight title
16	Win	14–2	Javier Franco	UD	10	2015-07-04	L.B. Scott Sports Auditorium, Philipsburg, Sint Marteen	Won vacant IBO International super bantamweight title
15	Loss	13–2	Emmanuel Rodríguez	KO	1 (10) 1:49	2014-10-18	Coliseo Cosme Beitia Salamo, Catano, Puerto Rico	For vacant WBO Latino bantamweight title
14	Win	13–1	Jesús González	UD	6	2014-08-23	Ring of Dreams Boxing Gym, Winston-Salem, U.S.	
13	Loss	12–1	Timur Shailezov	TKO	3 (6) 1:56	2014-04-24	Sands Bethlehem Event Center, Bethlehem, U.S.	
12	Win	12–0	Miguel Robles	KO	2 (8) 2:31	2014-03-21	Harrah's Philadelphia, Chester, U.S.	
11	Win	11–0	Felipe Rivas	RTD	6 (8) 3:00	2014-01-25	Sands Bethlehem Event Center, Bethlehem U.S.	
10	Win	10–0	Eduardo Valenzuela	UD	6	2013-12-18	Sands Bethlehem Center, Bethlehem, U.S.	
9	Win	9–0	Jhon Alberto Molina	UD	4	2013-10-25	National Guard Armory, Philadelphia, U.S.	
8	Win	8–0	Eduardo Melendez	UD	4	2013-08-23	Valley Forge Casino and Resort, Valley Forge, U.S.	
7	Win	7–0	Angel Carvajal	UD	4	2013-04-27	Barclays Center, Brooklyn, U.S.	
6	Win	6–0	Jose Rivera	UD	6	2012-10-12	National Guard Armory, Philadelphia, U.S.	
5	Win	5–0	Luis Miguel Ortiz	UD	4	2012-04-20	National Guard Armory, Philadelphia, U.S.	
4	Win	4–0	David Rodriquez	TKO	1 (6) ?	2012-01-13	National Guard Armory, Philadelphia, U.S.	
3	Win	3–0	Christian Cruz	TKO	2 (4) 2:20	2011-09-10	Boardwalk Hall, Atlantic City, U.S.	
2	Win	2–0	Jaime Gonzalez	KO	2 (4) ?	2011-06-25	South Philly Arena, Philadelphia, U.S.	
1	Win	1–0	Omar Gonzalez	UD	4	2011-03-26	Boardwalk Hall, Atlantic City, U.S.	
