= Adrian Curiel =

Mexican boxer (born 1999)

Personal information
- Nickname: Gatito
- Born: Adrian Curiel Dominguez; January 12, 1999 (age 27) Mexico City, Mexico
- Height: 5 ft 4 in (163 cm)
- Weight: Light flyweight

Boxing career
- Stance: Orthodox

Boxing record
- Total fights: 34
- Wins: 26
- Win by KO: 5
- Losses: 7
- Draws: 1

Adrian Curiel Dominguez (born January 12, 1999) is a Mexican professional boxer, who formerly held the International Boxing Federation (IBF) light flyweight championship, retaining the title from 2023 to 2024.

== Professional career ==
Curiel turned professional in 2016 and compiled a record 23–4–1 before facing & defeating Sivenathi Nontshinga to win the IBF light flyweight title.

=== Curiel vs. Nontshinga 2 ===
On February 16, 2024, in Oaxaca, Mexico, Curiel was scheduled to make the first defense of his IBF light flyweight title in the championship rematch against Sivenathi Nontshinga. He lost the fight by TKO in the 10th round.

=== Curiel vs. Edwards ===
Curiel was scheduled to face Sunny Edwards in a 12-round super flyweight bout at Footprint Center in Phoenix, Arizona on June 29, 2024. Edwards won the fight via technical decision with the scores 90–82, 88-84 and 87–85. The fight was stopped after eight rounds due to a cut Edwards sustained due to an accidental head clash.

==== Curiel vs. Medina ====
Curiel challenged WBO bantamweight champion Christian Medina at Domo Alcalde in Guadalajara, Mexico, on 6 February 2026, but lost via unanimous decision.

== Professional boxing record ==
34 fights	26 wins	7 losses
By knockout	5	1
By decision	21	6
Draws	1	

No.	Result	Record	Opponent	Type	Round, time	Date	Location	Notes
34	Loss	26–7–1	Christian Medina	UD	12	06 Feb 2026	Domo Alcalde, Guadalajara, Mexico	For WBO bantamweight title
33	Win	26–6–1	Johan Rubio	UD	10	30 May 2025	Domo Alcalde, Guadalajara, Mexico	
32	Win	25–6–1	Damian Arce	UD	10	6 Dec 2024	Domo Deportivo Metropolitano, Ciudad Nezahualcóyotl, Mexico	
31	Loss	24–6–1	Sunny Edwards	TD	9 (12), 0:01	29 Jun 2024	Footprint Center, Phoenix, Arizona, U.S.	
30	Loss	24–5–1	Sivenathi Nontshinga	TKO	10 (12), 0:44	16 Feb 2024	Auditorio Guelaguetza, Oaxaca City, Mexico	Lost IBF light flyweight title
29	Win	24–4–1	Sivenathi Nontshinga	KO	2 (12), 1:09	4 Nov 2023	Salle Médecin, Monte Carlo, Monaco	Won IBF light flyweight title
28	Win	23–4–1	Ivan Garcia Carrillo	TKO	3 (10)	4 Aug 2023	Churubusco Convention Center, Mexico City, Mexico	
27	Draw	22–4–1	Jose Ramirez Armenta	TD	4 (10), 0:16	17 Jun 2023	Lienzo Charro de Aragón, Mexico City, Mexico	
26	Win	22–4	Arnulfo Salvador Rodriguez	UD	8	24 Feb 2023	FairPlay Club, Hermosillo, Mexico	
25	Win	21–4	Maximino Flores	UD	10	28 Oct 2022	Grand Hotel, Tijuana, Mexico	
24	Win	20–4	Mario Andrade	UD	8	19 Aug 2022	Polideportivo Nuevo Sol, La Paz, Mexico	
23	Win	19–4	Hugo Hernandez	SD	10	28 Jan 2022	Grand Hotel, Tijuana, Mexico	
22	Win	18–4	Oscar Nery Plata	MD	8	8 Oct 2021	Arena Sonora, Hermosillo, Mexico	
21	Win	17–4	Ali Cortez Padilla	UD	8	16 Jul 2021	Gimnasio Josué Neri Santos, Ciudad Juárez, Mexico	
20	Loss	16–4	Cristian Gonzalez Hernandez	MD	10	26 Mar 2021	FIT Center, Mexico City, Mexico	
19	Win	16–3	Rosendo Hugo Guarneros	UD	10	13 Mar 2020	Centro de Convenciones IMSS, Tlalpan, Mexico	
18	Loss	15–3	Joselito Velázquez	UD	10	30 Nov 2019	Arena La Paz, La Paz, Mexico	
17	Win	15–2	Mario Andrade	MD	10	4 Oct 2019	Domo Sindicato de Trabajadores IMSS, Tlalpan, Mexico	
16	Win	14–2	Osvaldo Razon	UD	8	28 Jun 2019	Domo Sindicato de Trabajadores IMSS, Tlalpan, Mexico	
15	Win	13–2	Ricardo Velazco Segovia	SD	8	27 Apr 2019	Feria Nacional de San Marcos, Aguascalientes, Mexico	
14	Loss	12–2	Sergio Mejia	MD	6	8 Mar 2019	Deportivo Trabajadores del Metro, Iztacalco, Mexico	
13	Win	12–1	Daniel Romero Garcia	UD	8	7 Dec 2018	Auditorio BB, Mexico City, Mexico	
12	Loss	11–1	Daniel Valladares	UD	10	2 Jun 2018	Arena José Sulaimán, Monterrey, Mexico	For WBC Youth Silver light flyweight title
11	Win	11–0	Angel Martinez Castillo	UD	6	14 Apr 2018	Domo Sindicato de Trabajadores IMSS, Tlalpan, Mexico	
10	Win	10–0	Alejandro Villasenor Hernandez	UD	6	3 Feb 2018	Centro de Convenciones, Tlalnepantla de Baz, Mexico	
9	Win	9–0	Adrian Pacheco Rodriguez	TKO	6 (6), 1:45	16 Dec 2017	Domo Sindicato de Trabajadores IMSS, Tlalpan, Mexico	
8	Win	8–0	Gustavo Aceves	TKO	4 (6), 1:55	21 Oct 2017	Estadio Centenario, Cuernavaca, Mexico	
7	Win	7–0	Jose Emmanuel Zuniga	UD	6	12 Aug 2017	Gimnasio Nuevo León Unido, Monterrey, Mexico	
6	Win	6–0	Geovani Garcia Barragan	UD	4	8 Jul 2017	Centro de Convenciones IMSS, Tlalpan, Mexico	
5	Win	5–0	Joshua Martinez Ramirez	SD	4	21 Jan 2017	Deportivo Benito Juárez, Mexico City, Mexico	
4	Win	4–0	Daniel Romero Garcia	UD	4	21 Oct 2016	Auditorio Blackberry, Mexico City, Mexico	
3	Win	3–0	Mauricio Cruz	MD	4	8 Jul 2016	Auditorio Blackberry, Mexico City, Mexico	
2	Win	2–0	Adrian Pacheco Rodriguez	UD	4	22 May 2016	Arena San Juan de Pantitlan, Ciudad Nezahualcóyotl, Mexico	
1	Win	1–0	Hector Garcia Dolores	TKO	1 (4), 2:58	18 Mar 2016	Auditorio Blackberry, Mexico City, Mexico	

== See also ==
- List of Mexican boxing world champions
- List of world light-flyweight boxing champions

Sporting positions
World boxing titles
Preceded by Sivenathi Nontshinga	IBF Light flyweight champion November 4, 2023 – February 16, 2024	Succeeded by Sivenathi Nontshinga
