= Masamichi Yabuki =

Japanese boxer (born 1992)

Masamichi Yabuki 矢吹正道
Personal information
- Born: Masamichi Sato; July 9, 1992 (age 34) Suzuka, Mie, Japan
- Height: 5 ft 5 1/2 in (166 cm)
- Weight: Light flyweight; Flyweight

Boxing career
- Reach: 64 1/2 in (164 cm)
- Stance: Orthodox

Boxing record
- Total fights: 24
- Wins: 20
- Win by KO: 18
- Losses: 4

Masamichi Yabuki (born July 9, 1992) is a Japanese professional boxer. He is a three time world champion in two weight classes, having held the International Boxing Federation (IBF) flyweight title since March 2025. He previously held the World Boxing Council (WBC) light-flyweight title from 2021 to 2022 and the IBF light-flyweight title from 2024 to 2025.

== Professional career ==
=== Early career ===
Yabuki made his professional debut against Shohei Horii on March 27, 2016. He won the fight by a first-round technical knockout. He would go on to amass a 7–3 record over the next two years, most notably losing a close unanimous decision against Junto Nakatani on December 23, 2016, and a split decision to Daniel Matellon on September 28, 2018.

Yabuki won his next three fights, achieving stoppage victories against Bae Min-Chul, Ryuto Oho and Rikito Shiba, before he was scheduled to face Tsuyoshi Sato for the vacant Japanese light flyweight title on July 26, 2020. Yabuki stopped Sato with a left hook, near the end of the first round. He was scheduled to make his first title defense against Toshimasa Ouchi on December 26, 2020. He won the fight by unanimous decision.

=== WBC light flyweight champion ===
==== Yabuki vs. Shiro ====
Yabuki, at the time the #1 ranked WBC light flyweight contender, was scheduled to challenge the reigning WBC light flyweight champion Kenshiro Teraji, in Shiro's ninth title defense, on September 10, 2021, at the City Gym in Kyoto, Japan. The bout was later postponed for September 22, 2021, as both Shiro and his coach tested positive for COVID-19. The fight was rescheduled for September 22, 2021. Yabuki won the fight by a tenth-round technical knockout. He appeared to be ahead on the scorecards heading into the tenth round, which prompted Shiro to increase his pace and volume. Although Shiro seemed close to finishing him, Yabuki managed to take over the round near its end and unload with volume which forced the referee to stop the fight.

==== Yabuki vs. Shiro II ====
On November 15, 2021, representatives of Kenshiro Teraji and Masamichi Yabuki held a press conference to announce that they’d agreed to a rematch, which would be held sometime in spring of 2022. The rematch for the WBC title was officially announced on January 24, 2022. It took place at the City Gym in Kyoto, Japan, on March 19, 2022. Yabuki lost the fight by a third-round knockout.

=== Post title reign ===
Yabuki faced the undefeated Thanongsak Simsri on September 10, 2022 in what was promoted as a world title prelude. He won the fight by a seventh-round technical knockout. Yabuki knocked his opponent down twice prior to the stoppage, in the second and sixth rounds. During the in-ring post-fight speech, Yabuki revealed that he had injured his pelvis in the third round. He also announced that he was considering moving up to fight for a title at flyweight The fight was held at a catchweight of 50 kilograms.

Yabuki faced Ronald Chacon on January 28, 2023. He won the fight by an eleventh-round technical knockout.

=== IBF light-flyweight champion ===
==== Yabuki vs. Nontshinga ====
Yabuki stopped IBF light-flyweight champion Sivenathi Nontshinga in the ninth round at Aichi Sky Expo in Tokoname, Japan, on 12 October 2024 to become a two-time world champion.

=== IBF Flyweight champion ===
==== Yabuki vs. Ayala ====
Yabuki challenged IBF flyweight champion Ángel Ayala at Aichi Sky Expo in Tokoname, Japan, on 29 March 2025. He became a two-weight world champion when he won the fight via technical knockout in the 12th round.

==== Yabuki vs. Alvarado ====
Again at Aichi Sky Expo in Tokoname, Yabuki made a successful first defense of his title by knocking out Felix Alvarado in the 12th round on 27 December 2025.

==== Yabuki vs. Calixto ====
Yabuki made the second defense of his IBF flyweight title against Rene Calixto at Aichi Sky Expo in Tokoname, Japan on 6 June 2026. He won by unanimous decision.

== Professional boxing record ==
24 fights	20 wins	4 losses
By knockout	18	2
By decision	2	2

No.	Result	Record	Opponent	Type	Round, time	Date	Location	Notes
24	Win	20–4	Rene Calixto	UD	12	Jun 6, 2026	Aichi Sky Expo, Tokoname, Japan	Retained IBF flyweight title
23	Win	19–4	Felix Alvarado	KO	12 (12), 1:59	Dec 27, 2025	Aichi Sky Expo, Tokoname, Japan	Retained IBF flyweight title
22	Win	18–4	Ángel Ayala	TKO	12 (12), 1:54	Mar 29, 2025	Aichi Sky Expo, Tokoname, Japan	Won IBF flyweight title
21	Win	17–4	Sivenathi Nontshinga	TKO	9 (12), 1:50	Oct 12, 2024	Aichi Sky Expo, Tokoname, Japan	Won IBF light-flyweight title
20	Win	16–4	Kevin Vivas	TKO	4 (10), 2:41	Mar 16, 2024	Port Messe Nagoya, Nagoya, Japan	
19	Win	15–4	Ronald Chacon	TKO	11 (12), 2:35	Jan 28, 2023	International Conference Hall, Nagoya, Japan	
18	Win	14–4	Thanongsak Simsri	TKO	7 (10), 1:19	Sep 10, 2022	City Gymnasium, Yokkaichi, Mie, Japan	
17	Loss	13–4	Kenshiro Teraji	KO	3 (12), 1:11	Mar 19, 2022	City Gym, Kyoto, Japan	Lost WBC light-flyweight title
16	Win	13–3	Kenshiro Teraji	TKO	10 (12), 2:59	Sep 22, 2021	City Gym, Kyoto, Japan	Won WBC light-flyweight title
15	Win	12–3	Toshimasa Ouchi	UD	10	Dec 26, 2020	Aioi Hall, Kariya, Japan	Retained Japanese light-flyweight title
14	Win	11–3	Tsuyoshi Sato	KO	1 (10), 2:55	Jul 26, 2020	Aioi Hall, Kariya, Japan	Won vacant Japanese light-flyweight title
13	Win	10–3	Rikito Shiba	TKO	4 (8), 1:53	Dec 15, 2019	Aioi Hall, Kariya, Japan	
12	Win	9–3	Ryuto Oho	TKO	6 (8), 1:20	May 1, 2019	Korakuen Hall, Tokyo, Japan	
11	Win	8–3	Bae Min-Chul	TKO	5 (8), 2:20	Jan 27, 2019	Wolbae Sports Center, Daegu, South Korea	
10	Loss	7–3	Daniel Matellon	SD	8	Sep 29, 2018	Korakuen Hall, Tokyo, Japan	
9	Win	7–2	Gilberto Pedroza	KO	2 (8), 1:44	Jun 17, 2018	Aioi Hall, Kariya, Japan	
8	Loss	6–2	Seigo Yuri Akui	TKO	1 (8), 1:32	Apr 8, 2018	Suntopia, Sōja, Japan	
7	Win	6–1	Masashi Tada	TKO	1 (6), 2:27	Nov 26, 2017	Aioi Hall, Kariya, Japan	
6	Win	5–1	Masaki Hirai	TKO	2 (6), 0:59	Jul 16, 2017	Aioi Hall, Kariya, Japan	
5	Win	4–1	Kim Kwang-Min	TKO	1 (4), 0:58	Mar 26, 2017	Aioi Hall, Kariya, Japan	
4	Loss	3–1	Junto Nakatani	UD	4	Dec 23, 2016	Korakuen Hall, Tokyo, Japan	
3	Win	3–0	Ryosuke Nasu	KO	1 (4), 1:04	Nov 6, 2016	EDION Arena, Osaka, Japan	
2	Win	2–0	Kiyoshi Nakamura	TKO	1 (4), 2:12	Aug 7, 2016	Aioi Hall, Kariya, Japan	
1	Win	1–0	Shohei Horii	TKO	1 (4), 2:29	Mar 27, 2016	Aioi Hall, Kariya, Japan	

== Titles in boxing ==
=== Major world boxing titles ===
- WBC light-flyweight champion (108 lbs)
- IBF light-flyweight champion (108 lbs)
- IBF flyweight champion (112 lbs)

=== Regional/International titles ===
- Japanese light-flyweight champion (108 lbs)

== See also ==
- List of male boxers
- Boxing in Japan
- List of Japanese boxing world champions
- List of world light-flyweight boxing champions
- List of world flyweight boxing champions

Sporting positions
Regional boxing titles
Vacant Title last held by Yuto Takahashi	Japanese light-flyweight champion July 26, 2020 – September 22, 2021; Won world title	Vacant Title next held by Shokichi Iwata
World boxing titles
Preceded by Kenshiro Teraji	WBC light-flyweight champion September 22, 2021 – March 19, 2022	Succeeded by Kenshiro Teraji
Preceded by Sivenathi Nontshinga	IBF light-flyweight champion October 12, 2024 – April 10, 2025; Vacated	Vacant Title next held by Thanongsak Simsri
Preceded by Ángel Ayala	IBF flyweight champion March 29, 2025 – present	Incumbent
