= International Boxing Federation =

Sanctioning organization for professional boxing bouts

- Abbreviation: IBF
- Formation: 1983; 43 years ago
- Type: Non-profit institution
- Purpose: Boxing sanctioning organization
- Headquarters: Springfield, New Jersey, U.S.
- Region served: Worldwide
- President: Daryl Peoples
- Main organ: General Assembly
- Website: ibf-usba-boxing.com

The International Boxing Federation (IBF) is one of four major organizations recognized by the International Boxing Hall of Fame (IBHOF) which sanctions professional boxing bouts. The others are the World Boxing Association (WBA), World Boxing Council (WBC) and World Boxing Organization (WBO).

== History ==
The IBF was preceded by the United States Boxing Association (USBA), a regional championship organization like the North American Boxing Federation (NABF). In 1983, at the WBA's annual convention, held in Puerto Rico, Robert W. "Bobby" Lee Sr., president of the USBA, lost in his bid to become WBA president against Gilberto Mendoza. Lee and others withdrew from the convention after the election, and decided to organize a third, world-level organization, to co-exist with the WBA and the WBC. Formed as USBA-International, the fledgling organization was renamed the International Boxing Federation on November 6, 1983, based in New Jersey, where its main offices remain.

Bobby Lee had also been a New Jersey boxing commissioner until 1985, when, according to news reports, "he was suspended and fined by the Ethical Standards Commission for accepting contributions from fight promoters and casino executives."

The IBF's first world champion was Marvin Camel, a former WBC world cruiserweight champion who won the IBF's belt in the same division. During its first year of existence the IBF remained largely obscure, but by 1984 it decided to recognize Larry Holmes, Aaron Pryor, Marvin Hagler and Donald Curry, already established champions from other organizations, as IBF world champions. In Holmes' case, he relinquished his WBC title to accept the IBF's recognition. It established the IBF as the third sanctioning body, and a legitimate organization.

IBF men's world championship belts are red, whereas women's world championship belts are light blue.

=== 20th-century bribery scandal ===
Despite achieving an appearance of legitimacy, subsequent to a three-year investigation started by 1996 charges levied by former heavyweight champion Michael Moorer; IBF's reputation was ruined in 1999 with founder Lee's indictment for racketeering and other violations for taking bribes in exchange for high boxer rankings. Indicted on federal racketeering and racketeering conspiracy charges were "president, Robert W. Lee, 65; his son and IBF liaison, Robert Lee Jr., 38; former IBF executive and Virginia boxing commissioner Donald William Brennan, 86; and South American IBF representative Francisco Fernandez." Lee was subsequently convicted of money-laundering and tax evasion in August 2000, then sentenced, in 2001, to 22 months in prison and fined $25,000.

In 2000, citing extortion, boxing promoter Bob Arum voluntarily testified to having paid IBF president Bobby Lee $100,000 in two installments in 1995, as the first half of a $200,000 bribe, through "middleman, Stanley Hoffman", adding that Lee had first demanded $500,000 to approve the Schulz-Foreman fight, but had settled for the lesser amount of $200,000 (half of which was never paid). Arum was sanctioned and fined $125,000 by the Nevada State Athletic Commission. Boxing promoters Cedric Kushner and Dino Duva also admitted to making similar payments to Lee.

"A culture of corruption has festered in the IBF virtually since its inception... IBF ratings were not earned – they were bought... The crimes have bastardized the ratings in most of the weight classes." — Adam Miller quoting Assistant U.S. Attorney Robert Cleary, "FEDS BID TO KO BOXING BIGS WITH 'BRIBE' RAP", New York Post, November 5, 1999

=== 21st-century management ===
The IBF was under federal observation from Lee's conviction through September 2004. Former Michigan Boxing Commissioner, WBA vice-president, boxing safety advocate and IBF interim president Hiawatha Knight (October 22, 1929 – October 22, 2014) became president following Lee's conviction, and was the first woman president of any world governing boxing organization. In 2001, Marian Muhammad assumed the presidency, followed by Daryl J. Peoples, who remained president as of 2018.

The IBF ran the "1st Annual Convention of IBF Muaythai" in Bangkok on 20–21 December 2017. Daryl Peoples, IBF president, attended the convention. The new champions of IBF Muay Thai were crowned in three weight divisions.

In response to the Russian invasion of Ukraine, the Federation blocked championship fights involving Russian and Belarusian boxers.

== Current IBF world title holders ==
As of 9 November 2026

=== Male ===
Weight class	Champion (14)	Reign began	Days
Mini flyweight (105 lbs)	Pedro Taduran	28 July 2024	834
Junior flyweight (108 lbs)	Thanongsak Simsri	19 June 2025	508
Flyweight (112 lbs)	Masamichi Yabuki	29 March 2025	590
Junior bantamweight (115 lbs)	Andrew Moloney	6 June 2026	156
Bantamweight (118 lbs)	José Salas	13 December 2025	331
Junior featherweight (122 lbs)	Naoya Inoue	26 December 2023	1049
Junior featherweight (122 lbs)	Sam Goodman	27 September 2026	43
Featherweight (126 lbs)	Angelo Leo	10 August 2024	821
Junior lightweight (130 lbs)	O'Shaquie Foster	24 October 2026	16
Lightweight (135 lbs)	Raymond Muratalla	9 June 2025	517
Junior welterweight (140 lbs)	Vacant		
Welterweight (147 lbs)	Liam Paro	24 June 2026	138
Junior middleweight (154 lbs)	Josh Kelly	31 January 2026	282
Middleweight (160 lbs)	Aaron McKenna	8 August 2026	93
Super middleweight (168 lbs)	Osleys Iglesias	9 April 2026	214
Light heavyweight (175 lbs)	Dmitry Bivol	22 February 2025	625
Cruiserweight (200 lbs)	Vacant		
Heavyweight (200+ lbs)	Filip Hrgović	29 August 2026	72

=== Female ===
Weight class	Champion (17)	Reign began	Days
Junior mini flyweight (102 lbs)	Sumire Yamanaka	7 April 2026	216
Mini flyweight (105 lbs)	Kim Clavel	27 September 2025	408
Junior flyweight (108 lbs)	Estefany Alegria	13 June 2026	149
Flyweight (112 lbs)	Gabriela Fundora	21 October 2023	1115
Junior bantamweight (115 lbs)	Irma García	11 November 2023	1094
Bantamweight (118 lbs)	Cherneka Johnson	11 July 2025	486
Junior featherweight (122 lbs)	Vacant		
Featherweight (126 lbs)	Nina Meinke	21 September 2024	779
Junior lightweight (130 lbs)	Alycia Baumgardner	15 October 2022	1486
Lightweight (135 lbs)	Alycia Baumgardner	8 November 2026	1
Junior welterweight (140 lbs)	Katie Taylor	25 November 2023	1080
Welterweight (147 lbs)	Natasha Jonas	1 July 2023	1227
Junior middleweight (154 lbs)	Oshae Jones	24 November 2024	1081
Middleweight (160 lbs)	Desley Robinson	13 December 2024	696
Super middleweight (168 lbs)	Lani Daniels	17 April 2026	206
Light heavyweight (175 lbs)	Sarah Scheurich	6 December 2025	338
Heavyweight (175+ lbs)	Claressa Shields	2 February 2025	645

=== Muay Thai world champions ===
Weight class	Champion	Reign began	Days
Junior lightweight (130 lbs)	Petchaouthong Aor. Kwanmaung	21 December 2017	3245
Lightweight (135 lbs)	Seksan Aor. Kwanmuang	21 December 2017	3245
Welterweight (147 lbs)	Pinklao Bangkoknoivillage	20 December 2017	3246

== See also ==
- List of major boxing sanctioning bodies
- List of IBF world champions
- List of IBF female world champions
- List of current world boxing champions
- List of IBF Muay Thai world champions
