= List of current world boxing champions =

This is a list of current male world boxing champions. Since at least John L. Sullivan, in the late 19th century, there have been world champions in professional boxing. The first of the current organizations to award a world title was the World Boxing Association (WBA), then known as the National Boxing Association (NBA), when it sanctioned its first title fight in 1921 between Jack Dempsey and Georges Carpentier for the world heavyweight championship.

There are now four major sanctioning bodies in professional boxing. The official rules and regulations of the WBA, World Boxing Council (WBC), International Boxing Federation (IBF), and World Boxing Organization (WBO) all recognize each other in their rankings and title unification rules. Each of these organizations sanction and regulate championship bouts and award world titles. American boxing magazine The Ring began awarding world titles in 1922.

There are 18 weight divisions. To compete in a division, a boxer's weight must not exceed the upper limit. Manny Pacquiao has won world championships in eight weight divisions, more than any other boxer in history. The Klitschko brothers, Vitali and Wladimir, held all four major titles in the heavyweight division from 2011 to 2013; they were the first brothers to hold versions of the heavyweight championship at the same time.

== Championships ==
When a champion, for reasons beyond his control such as an illness or injury, is unable to defend his title within the normal mandatory time, the sanctioning bodies may order an interim title bout and award the winner an interim championship. The WBA and WBC have often changed the status of their inactive champions to a "Champion in Recess" or "Champion Emeritus".

=== World Boxing Association ===
The World Boxing Association (WBA) was founded in 1921 as the National Boxing Association (NBA), a national regulating body of the United States. On August 23, 1962, the NBA became the WBA, which today has its head office in Panama. According to WBA championship rules, when a champion also holds a title of one of the other three major sanctioning bodies in an equivalent weight division, that boxer is granted a special recognition of "Unified Champion", and is given more time between mandatory title defenses. The WBA Championships Committee and President may also designate a champion as a "Super Champion" or "Undisputed Champion" in exceptional circumstances; the standard WBA title is then vacated and contested between WBA-ranked contenders. When a WBA "Regular Champion" makes between five and ten successful defenses, he may be granted the WBA "Super" title upon discretion of a vote of the WBA's board of governors.

=== World Boxing Council ===
The World Boxing Council (WBC) was founded in Mexico City, Mexico, on February 14, 1963, to establish an international regulating body. The WBC established many of today's safety measures in boxing, such as the standing eight count, a limit of 12 rounds instead of 15, and additional weight divisions. More information about the WBC's other titles including "Silver", "Diamond", "Emeritus", "Franchise", "Honorary", and "Supreme Champion" can be read at the WBC article.

=== International Boxing Federation ===
The International Boxing Federation (IBF) originated in September 1976 as the United States Boxing Association (USBA) when American members of the WBA withdrew to legitimize boxing in the United States with "unbiased" ratings. In April 1983, the organization established an international division that was known as the United States Boxing Association-International (USBA-I). In May 1984, the New Jersey–based USBA-I was renamed and became the IBF.

=== World Boxing Organization ===
The World Boxing Organization (WBO) was founded in San Juan, Puerto Rico (which is a self-governing commonwealth of the United States) in 1988. In its early years the WBO's titles were not widely recognized. By 2012 when the Japan Boxing Commission officially recognized the governing body, it had gained similar status to the other three major sanctioning bodies. Its motto is "dignity, democracy, honesty." When a WBO champion has reached "preeminent status", the WBO's Executive Committee may designate him as a "Super Champion". However, this is only an honorary title and not the same as the WBA's policy of having separate "Super" and "Regular" champions. A WBO "Super Champion" cannot win or lose that recognition in the ring; it is merely awarded by the WBO.

=== The Ring ===
The boxing magazine The Ring awards its own belts. The original title sequence began from the magazine's first publication in the 1920s until its titles were placed on hiatus in 1989, continuing as late as 1992 in some divisions. When The Ring started awarding titles again in 2001, it did not calculate retrospective lineages to fill in the gap years, instead nominating a new champion.

In 2007, The Ring was acquired by the owners of fight promoter Golden Boy Promotions, which has publicized The Ring's world championships when they are at stake in fights it promotes (such as Joe Calzaghe vs. Roy Jones Jr. in 2008). Since 2012, to reduce the number of vacant titles, The Ring allows fights between a number one or two contender; or alternatively a number three, four, or five contender to fill a vacant title. This has prompted further doubts about its credibility. Some boxing journalists have been extremely critical of the new championship policy and state that if this new policy is followed, the Ring title may lose the credibility it once held.

== Current champions ==
The current champions in each weight division are listed below. Each champion's professional boxing record is shown in the following format: wins – losses – draws (no contests) (knockout wins).

=== Heavyweight (+200 lb/+90.7 kg or +224 lb/+101.6 kg) ===
| WBA | WBC | IBF | WBO | The Ring |
| Murat Gassiev; 34–2 (1) (27 KO); July 1, 2026 | Agit Kabayel; 27–0 (19 KO); June 27, 2026 | Filip Hrgović; 21–1 (16 KO); August 29, 2026 | Daniel Dubois; 24–3 (23 KO); May 9, 2026 | Oleksandr Usyk; 25–0 (16 KO); August 20, 2022 |

=== Bridgerweight (224 lb/101.6 kg) ===
| WBA | WBC | IBF | WBO | The Ring |
| | Ryad Merhy; 36–3 (29 KO); May 30, 2026 | | | |

=== Cruiserweight/Junior heavyweight (200 lb/90.7 kg or 190 lb/86.2 kg) ===
| WBA | WBC | IBF | WBO | The Ring |
| David Benavidez; Super champion 32–0 (26 KO); May 2, 2026 | Michał Cieślak; 28–2 (1) (22 KO); June 28, 2025 | vacant | David Benavidez; 32–0 (26 KO); May 2, 2026 | Jai Opetaia; 31–0 (24 KO); July 2, 2022 |
| Jai Opetaia; Regular champion 31–0 (24 KO); September 12, 2026 | Michał Cieślak; 28–2 (1) (22 KO); June 28, 2025 | vacant | David Benavidez; 32–0 (26 KO); May 2, 2026 | Jai Opetaia; 31–0 (24 KO); July 2, 2022 |

=== Light heavyweight (175 lb/79.4 kg) ===
| WBA | WBC | IBF | WBO | The Ring |
| Dmitry Bivol; Super champion 25–1 (12 KO); February 22, 2025 | Willy Hutchinson; 21–2 (14 KO); November 7, 2026 | Dmitry Bivol; 25–1 (12 KO); February 22, 2025 | Dmitry Bivol; 25–1 (12 KO); February 22, 2025 | Dmitry Bivol; 25–1 (12 KO); February 22, 2025 |
| Albert Ramírez; Interim champion 23–0 (19 KO); August 8, 2025 | Willy Hutchinson; 21–2 (14 KO); November 7, 2026 | Dmitry Bivol; 25–1 (12 KO); February 22, 2025 | Callum Smith; Interim champion 31–2 (22 KO); February 22, 2025 | Dmitry Bivol; 25–1 (12 KO); February 22, 2025 |

=== Super middleweight (168 lb/76.2 kg) ===
| WBA | WBC | IBF | WBO | The Ring |
| Jaime Munguia; 47–2 (35 KO); May 2, 2026 | Canelo Álvarez; 64–3–2 (39 KO); October 31, 2026 | Osleys Iglesias; 16–0 (15 KO); April 9, 2026 | vacant | vacant |
| Jaime Munguia; 47–2 (35 KO); May 2, 2026 | Lester Martínez; Interim champion 21–0–1 (17 KO); March 21, 2026 | Osleys Iglesias; 16–0 (15 KO); April 9, 2026 | vacant | vacant |

=== Middleweight (160 lb/72.6 kg) ===
| WBA | WBC | IBF | WBO | The Ring |
| Erislandy Lara; 32–3–3 (19 KO); May 1, 2021 | Carlos Adames; 25–1–1 (18 KO); May 7, 2024 | Aaron McKenna; 21–0 (10 KO); August 8, 2026 | vacant | vacant |
| Erislandy Lara; 32–3–3 (19 KO); May 1, 2021 | Jesus Ramos; Interim champion 24–1 (19 KO); December 6, 2025 | Aaron McKenna; 21–0 (10 KO); August 8, 2026 | vacant | vacant |

=== Super welterweight / Junior middleweight (154 lb / 69.9 kg) ===
| WBA | WBC | IBF | WBO | The Ring |
| Jaron Ennis; 36–0 (1) (32 KO); June 27, 2026 | Sebastian Fundora; 25–1–1 (17 KO); March 30, 2024 | Josh Kelly; 18–1–1 (9 KO); January 31, 2026 | Jaron Ennis; 36–0 (1) (32 KO); June 27, 2026 | vacant |
| Jaron Ennis; 36–0 (1) (32 KO); June 27, 2026 | Vergil Ortiz Jr. Interim champion 24–0 (22 KO); August 10, 2024 | Josh Kelly; 18–1–1 (9 KO); January 31, 2026 | Jaron Ennis; 36–0 (1) (32 KO); June 27, 2026 | vacant |

=== Welterweight (147 lb/66.7 kg) ===
| WBA | WBC | IBF | WBO | The Ring |
| Teofimo Lopez; Super champion 23–2 (13 KO); August 22, 2026 | Ryan Garcia; 26–2 (1) (21 KO); February 22, 2026 | Liam Paro; 28–1 (16 KO); June 24, 2026 | Devin Haney; 33–0 (1) (15 KO); November 22, 2025 | vacant |
| Jack Catterall; Regular champion 33–2 (14 KO); May 23, 2026 | Ryan Garcia; 26–2 (1) (21 KO); February 22, 2026 | Liam Paro; 28–1 (16 KO); June 24, 2026 | Devin Haney; 33–0 (1) (15 KO); November 22, 2025 | vacant |

=== Super lightweight/Junior welterweight (140 lb/63.5 kg) ===
| WBA | WBC | IBF | WBO | The Ring |
| Gary Antuanne Russell; 19–1 (17 KO); March 1, 2025 | Dalton Smith; 20-0 (14 KO); January 10, 2026 | vacant | Shakur Stevenson; 25–0 (11 KO); January 31, 2026 | Shakur Stevenson; 25–0 (11 KO); January 31, 2026 |
| Khariton Agrba; Interim champion 18–1 (9 KO); October 10, 2026 | Isaac Cruz; Interim champion 29–3–2 (19 KO); July 19, 2025 | vacant | Shakur Stevenson; 25–0 (11 KO); January 31, 2026 | Shakur Stevenson; 25–0 (11 KO); January 31, 2026 |

=== Lightweight (135 lb/61.2 kg) ===
| WBA | WBC | IBF | WBO | The Ring |
| Floyd Schofield; 20–0 (13 KO); October 10, 2026 | William Zepeda; 34–1 (27 KO); August 1, 2026 | vacant | Abdullah Mason; 21–0 (18 KO); November 22, 2025 | vacant |
| Floyd Schofield; 20–0 (13 KO); October 10, 2026 | Jadier Herrera; Interim champion 18–0 (16 KO); January 10, 2026 | vacant | Abdullah Mason; 21–0 (18 KO); November 22, 2025 | vacant |

=== Super featherweight/Junior lightweight (130 lb/59 kg) ===
| WBA | WBC | IBF | WBO | The Ring |
| Anthony Cacace; Super Champion; 26–1 (9 KO); March 14, 2026 | O'Shaquie Foster; 26–3 (12 KO); November 2, 2024 | O'Shaquie Foster; 26–3 (12 KO); October 24, 2026 | O'Shaquie Foster; 26–3 (12 KO); October 24, 2026 | O'Shaquie Foster; 26–3 (12 KO); October 24, 2026 |
| Elnur Samedov; Regular champion 22–1 (11 KO); February 14, 2026 | Ryan Garner; Interim champion 20–0 (10 KO); June 20, 2026 | O'Shaquie Foster; 26–3 (12 KO); October 24, 2026 | O'Shaquie Foster; 26–3 (12 KO); October 24, 2026 | O'Shaquie Foster; 26–3 (12 KO); October 24, 2026 |

=== Featherweight (126 lb/57.2 kg) ===
| WBA | WBC | IBF | WBO | The Ring |
| vacant | Bruce Carrington; 18–0 (10 KO); January 31, 2026 | Angelo Leo; 26–1 (12 KO); August 10, 2024 | Rafael Espinoza; 29–0 (25 KO); December 9, 2023 | vacant |

=== Super bantamweight/Junior featherweight (122 lb/55.3 kg) ===
| WBA | WBC | IBF | WBO | The Ring |
| Naoya Inoue; Super champion 33–0 (27 KO); December 26, 2023 | Naoya Inoue; 33–0 (27 KO); July 25, 2023 | Naoya Inoue; 33–0 (27 KO); December 26, 2023 | Naoya Inoue; 33–0 (27 KO); July 25, 2023 | Naoya Inoue; 33–0 (27 KO); December 26, 2023 |
| Gary Antonio Russell; Interim champion 22–1–0–1 (13 KO); August 22, 2026 | Naoya Inoue; 33–0 (27 KO); July 25, 2023 | Sam Goodman; Interim champion 23–1 (8 KO); September 27, 2026 | Naoya Inoue; 33–0 (27 KO); July 25, 2023 | Naoya Inoue; 33–0 (27 KO); December 26, 2023 |

=== Bantamweight (118 lb/53.5 kg) ===
| WBA | WBC | IBF | WBO | The Ring |
| Jesse Rodriguez; Super champion 24–0 (17 KO); June 13, 2026 | Takuma Inoue; 23–2 (5 KO); November 24, 2025 | José Salas; 17–0 (11 KO); December 13, 2025 | Christian Medina; 27–4 (19 KO); September 14, 2025 | vacant |
| Riku Masuda; Regular champion 11–1 (9 KO); July 20, 2026 | Takuma Inoue; 23–2 (5 KO); November 24, 2025 | José Salas; 17–0 (11 KO); December 13, 2025 | Christian Medina; 27–4 (19 KO); September 14, 2025 | vacant |

=== Super flyweight/Junior bantamweight (115 lb/52.2 kg) ===
| WBA | WBC | IBF | WBO | The Ring |
| David Jiménez; 18–1 (12 KO); April 20, 2024 | Ricardo Malajika; 18–2 (12 KO); September 27, 2026 | Andrew Moloney; 29–4 (1) (18 KO); June 6, 2026 | Kenshiro Teraji; 26–2 (16 KO); July 20, 2026 | vacant |

=== Flyweight (112 lb/50.8 kg) ===
| WBA | WBC | IBF | WBO | The Ring |
| Sergio Mendoza; 28–1 (24 KO); October 10, 2026 | Sergio Mendoza; 28–1 (24 KO); October 10, 2026 | Masamichi Yabuki; 20–4 (18 KO); March 29, 2025 | Anthony Olascuaga; 13–1 (9 KO); July 20, 2024 | vacant |
| Abraham Perez; Interim champion 16–0 (7 KO); June 14, 2026 | Galal Yafai; Interim champion 9–0 (1) (7 KO); July 26, 2025 | Masamichi Yabuki; 20–4 (18 KO); March 29, 2025 | Anthony Olascuaga; 13–1 (9 KO); July 20, 2024 | vacant |

=== Light flyweight/Junior flyweight (108 lb/49 kg) ===
| WBA | WBC | IBF | WBO | The Ring |
| René Santiago; Unified champion 16–4 (9 KO); September 30, 2026 | Shokichi Iwata; 17–2 (14 KO); March 15, 2026 | Thanongsak Simsri; 41–1 (36 KO); June 19, 2025 | René Santiago; 16–4 (9 KO); March 13, 2025 | vacant |
| Daiya Kira; 5–0 (4 KO); September 2, 2026 | Shokichi Iwata; 17–2 (14 KO); March 15, 2026 | Thanongsak Simsri; 41–1 (36 KO); June 19, 2025 | René Santiago; 16–4 (9 KO); March 13, 2025 | vacant |

=== Minimumweight/Mini flyweight/Strawweight (105 lb/47.6 kg) ===
| WBA | WBC | IBF | WBO | The Ring |
| Oscar Collazo; Super champion 15–0 (12 KO); November 16, 2024 | Siyakholwa Kuse; 10–3–1 (4 KO); May 16, 2026 | Pedro Taduran; 21–4–1 (14 KO); July 28, 2024 | Ryūsei Matsumoto; 9–0 (4 KO); September 27, 2026 | Oscar Collazo; 15–0 (12 KO); November 16, 2024 |
| Takeshi Ishii; Regular champion 12–1 (9 KO); September 2, 2026 | Siyakholwa Kuse; 10–3–1 (4 KO); May 16, 2026 | Pedro Taduran; 21–4–1 (14 KO); July 28, 2024 | Ryūsei Matsumoto; 9–0 (4 KO); September 27, 2026 | Oscar Collazo; 15–0 (12 KO); November 16, 2024 |

== See also ==
- List of WBA world champions
- List of WBC world champions
- List of IBF world champions
- List of WBO world champions
- List of The Ring world champions
- List of current female world boxing champions
- List of undefeated world boxing champions (retired only)
- List of undisputed world boxing champions
- List of current boxing rankings
