= Kyosuke Takami =

Japanese boxer (born 2002)

Kyosuke Takami 高見亨介
Personal information
- Born: April 5, 2002 (age 24) Tokyo, Japan
- Height: 5 ft 5 1/2 in (166 cm)
- Weight: Light-flyweight, Super-flyweight

Boxing career
- Reach: 65 1/2 in (166 cm)
- Stance: Orthodox

Boxing record
- Total fights: 12
- Wins: 11
- Win by KO: 9
- Losses: 1

Kyosuke Takami (born April 5, 2002) is a Japanese professional boxer who held the World Boxing Association (WBA) light-flyweight title in 2025.

== Professional career ==
=== Early career ===
Takami made his professional debut on 2 July 2022, in a bout against Wutthichai Montri. In the opening moments of the contest, Takami scored a knockdown after connecting with right hand to the head of his opponent. Takami was declared the winner after Montri was unable to beat the count. Following his debut win, Takami scored three consecutive victories before facing Lito Dante on 2 December 2022. Takami was taken the distance for the first time in his career as he outboxed his opponent en route to a unanimous decision win.

On 2 March 2024, Takami faced Kenichi Horikawa. In the sixth round, Takami knocked his opponent down after connecting with a combination of punches. Takami was declared the winner after the referee opted to call an end to the bout following the knockdown. Takami's next bout was against Wulan Tuolehazi on 6 July 2024. Takami was dominant throughout the bout, and sealed the win via unanimous decision. On 2 November 2024, Takami faced Jomar Caindog. In the opening moments of the first round, Takami connected with a left hand to the body which sent knocked his opponent down onto the canvas. Takami secured the win after Caindog was unable to beat the count.

Takami faced Japanese light flyweight champion Toshiki Kawamitsu on 8 April 2025. Takami started the bout aggressively, and was able to consistent tag his opponent in the opening rounds. In the fifth round, Takami connected with an uppercut which visibly hurt Kawamitsu, which was quickly followed by a second punch. Following this, the referee waved an end to the bout. Winning the bout gained Takami the Japanese national light flyweight title.

=== World title ===
==== Rosa vs. Takami ====
On 11 June 2025, it was announced that Takami would face WBA light flyweight world champion Erick Rosa on 30 July 2025 in Yokohama. Takami went into the fight with a record of 9–0 before defeating Erick Rosa to win the WBA light-flyweight title. Takumi claimed the victory with a technical knock out 2 minutes and 48 seconds into the tenth of twelve rounds.

In the aftermath of his title win, Takami announced his intention of winning championships in various weight classes in the future.

==== Santiago vs. Takami ====
Takami’s first defense was in an unification bout with the World Boxing Organization’s (WBO) champion, René Santiago of Puerto Rico. Despite entering the fight as a 9-1 favorite, Takami lost to Santiago by split decision. The cards were 116-112, 113-115 and 111-117.

Fighting outside of Japan for the first time in his professional career and moving up in weight divisions to super-flyweight, Takami returned to the ring against Mohaleden Kalibo at Fuente Osmena Circle in Cebu City, Philippines, on 14 November 2026, winning by technical knockout in the sixth of the eight scheduled rounds.

== Family ==
Takami had a younger brother, Yume, who died at the age of 20 in June 2024. He dedicated his victory in the Rosa fight to him.

== Professional boxing record ==
12 fights	11 wins	1 loss
By knockout	9	0
By decision	2	1

No.	Result	Record	Opponent	Type	Round, time	Date	Location	Notes
12	Win	11–1	Mohaleden Kalibo	TKO	6 (8), 1:14	14 Nov 2026	Fuente Osmena Circle, Cebu City, Philippines	
11	Loss	10–1	René Santiago	SD	12	17 Dec 2025	Kokugikan, Tokyo, Japan	Lost WBA light-flyweight title; For WBO light-flyweight title
10	Win	10–0	Erick Rosa	TKO	10 (12), 2:48	30 Jul 2025	Yokohama Buntai, Yokohama, Japan	Won WBA light-flyweight title
9	Win	9–0	Toshiki Kawamitsu	TKO	6 (10), 2:26	8 Apr 2025	Korakuen Hall, Tokyo, Japan	Won Japanese light-flyweight title
8	Win	8–0	Jomar Caindog	KO	1 (8), 1:18	2 Nov 2024	Korakuen Hall, Tokyo, Japan	
7	Win	7–0	Wulan Tuolehazi	UD	8	6 Jul 2024	Korakuen Hall, Tokyo, Japan	
6	Win	6–0	Kenichi Horikawa	TKO	6 (10), 2:50	2 Mar 2024	Korakuen Hall, Tokyo, Japan	
5	Win	5–0	Lito Dante	UD	8	2 Dec 2023	Korakuen Hall, Tokyo, Japan	
4	Win	4–0	Ruben Dadivas	KO	1 (8), 2:40	5 Aug 2023	Korakuen Hall, Tokyo, Japan	
3	Win	3–0	Reymark Alicaba	TKO	5 (8), 0:19	4 Feb 2023	Korakuen Hall, Tokyo, Japan	
2	Win	2–0	In Cheol Hwang	TKO	2 (6), 1:55	1 Oct 2022	Korakuen Hall, Tokyo, Japan	
1	Win	1–0	Wutthichai Montri	KO	1 (6), 1:12	2 Jul 2022	Korakuen Hall, Tokyo, Japan	

== See also ==
- List of male boxers
- Boxing in Japan
- List of Japanese boxing world champions
- List of world light-flyweight boxing champions

Sporting positions
Regional boxing titles
Preceded by Toshiki Kawamitsu	Japanese light-flyweight champion April 8, 2025 – July 30, 2025; Won world title	Vacant Title next held by Masataka Taniguchi
World boxing titles
Preceded by Erick Rosa	WBA light-flyweight champion July 30, 2025 – December 17, 2025	Succeeded by René Santiago
