= Erick Rosa =

Dominican boxer

Personal information
- Nickname: Mini PacMan
- Born: Erick Yomer Rosa Pacheco; 18 March 2000 (age 26) Santo Domingo, Dominican Republic
- Height: 5 ft 3 in (160 cm)
- Weight: Mini-flyweight; Light-flyweight

Boxing career
- Reach: 65 in (165 cm)
- Stance: Southpaw

Boxing record
- Total fights: 10
- Wins: 9
- Win by KO: 2
- Losses: 1

Erick Yomer Rosa Pacheco (born 18 March 2000) is a Dominican professional boxer who has held the World Boxing Association (WBA) (Regular version) mini-flyweight title from 2021 to 2024, and the WBA light-flyweight title from 2024 to 2025.

== Professional career ==
=== Early career ===
Rosa was scheduled to make his professional debut against Oscar Bermudez Salas on 24 October 2020, for the vacant WBA Fedelatin and WBC Latino minimumweight titles. Rosa won the fight by unanimous decision, with two of the judges scoring all ten rounds in his favor, while the third judge awarded him a 98-92 scorecard.

Rosa was scheduled to defend his titles against Byron Castellon on 16 December 2020, in his second consecutive main event. The fight was originally set for the undercard of the Wilfredo Méndez and Alexis Diaz title fight. The title fight was later cancelled as Méndez withdrew due to illness the day before the event. Accordingly, Rosa vs. Castellon was announced as the new main event. He won the fight by unanimous decision, with scores of 97–93, 98-92 and 99–91.

Rosa was scheduled to make the second defense of his titles against Kenny Cano on 12 March 2021. Rosa justified his role as the favorite, winning the fight by a third-round knockout. It was his first career stoppage victory.

Rosa was scheduled to fight the undefeated Ricardo Astuvilca for the interim WBA minimumweight title on 21 July 2021. Astuvilca was the more experienced fighter coming into the bout, having won a total of 21 professional fights. The fight was scheduled as the co-main event for the Alberto Puello and Jesús Antonio Rubio WBA interim-super lightweight world title fight. Rosa won the interim title with by unanimous decision, with two of the judges awarding him a 117-110 scorecard, while the third judge scored it 114-113 for Rosa. Astuvilca scored the only knockdown of the fight in the fourth round, having dropped Rosa with a left hook, although Rosa claimed he slipped.

On 25 August 2021, the WBA ordered all of its interim titles to be vacated, in an effort to reduce the number of belts within the organization.

=== WBA Regular mini flyweight champion ===
==== Rosa vs. Saludar ====
On 10 September 2021, it was announced that Rosa would challenge WBA (Regular) mini flyweight titlist Vic Saludar. The fight was scheduled for 9 December 2021, at a venue to be determined, in Santo Domingo, Dominican Republic. The fight was later postponed for 21 December 2021, and was held at the Hotel Catalonia Malecon Center. Rosa won the fight by split decision, with two judges scoring the fight 116–109 and 113–112 in his favor, while the third judge scored it 113–112 for Saludar. Rosa scored knockdowns with a quick left in the third round, as well as with a left hook in the ninth round, while Saludar notched his sole knockdown with a right straight in the tenth round.

==== Rosa vs. Knockout ====
Rosa was expected to make his first WBA Regular title defense against the former WBC Silver minimumweight titleholder Carlos Ortega on 15 July 2022, in Santo Domingo, Dominican Republic. The fight was called-off by Rosa's promoter Shuan Boxing only hours before it was supposed to take place. Rosa and his team instead accepted a title unification offer made by the IBF mini flyweight champion Daniel Valladares. On 30 September 2022, Rosa was ordered to face Knockout CP Freshmart in a title consolidation bout. On 24 November, it was revealed that the pair had reached terms for a title consolidation bout. The fight was expected to take place on 17 December 2022, on the undercard of the Frank Martin and Michel Rivera lightweight bout. It was later cancelled, as Knockout wasn't able to enter the United States due to a visa issue. This prompted the WBA to call for a purse bid, which was won by Petchyindee Boxing Promotions with a bid of $140,000. The title fight was booked to take place on 1 March 2023, in Nakhon Sawan, Thailand. Rosa and his team were briefly detained by the Thailand immigration officials upon arrival on 20 February, due to an issue over the boxer's visa status. Following their release on 21 February, Rosa's promoter Belgica Pena announced that they withdrew from the fight.

The sanctioning body once again re-ordered Rosa to face Knockout in a title consolidation bout on 16 March 2023, and gave the two camps until 28 March to come to terms before a purse bid would be called, with a stipulation that the fight must be organized within 45–60 days from the time of the purse bid. They reached an agreement on 27 March. Both sides would later default on this agreement, which forced the sanctioning body to call for a purse to be held on 21 July 2023. A week later however, the WBA allowed both Rosa and Knockout to pursue a non-title bout to avoid a lengthy period of inactivity. Rosa faced Orlando Pino on 25 August 2023, who retired from the bout at the end of the eighth round. Following this victory, the WBA gave Knockout and Rosa three final dates by which a title consolidation bout would have to be held: 7 October 14 and 19 October. Rosa vacated the championship after several failed attempts to secure a title consolidation bout.

=== Light flyweight ===
Rosa made his light-flyweight debut against Yudal Reyes in a WBA Gold light-flyweight championship bout. The contest was booked as the main event of a Triller TV broadcast event, which took place at the Centro Olímpico Juan Pablo Duarte in Santo Domingo on 5 April 2024. Rosa won the fight by unanimous decision, with two scorecards of 117–110 and one scorecard of 118–109 in his favor.

=== WBA Light Flyweight Championship ===
==== Rosa vs. Valdez ====
Rosa is scheduled to challenge Neider Valdez for the vacant WBA light flyweight title on 19 December 2024, in Santo Domingo, Dominican Republic.

== Professional boxing record ==
10 fights	9 wins	1 loss
By knockout	2	1
By decision	7	0

No.	Result	Record	Opponent	Type	Round, time	Date	Location	Notes
10	Win	9–1	Luis Enrique De La Mora Beltran	UD	10	13 December 2025	Coliseo Carlos 'Teo' Cruz, Santo Domingo, Dominican Republic	
9	Loss	8–1	Kyosuke Takami	TKO	10 (12), 2:48	30 July 2025	Yokohama Cultural Gymnasium, Yokohama, Japan	Lost WBA light-flyweight title
8	Win	8–0	Neider Valdez Aguilar	UD	12	19 December 2024	Centro Olimpico, Santo Domingo, Dominican Republic	Won vacant WBA light-flyweight title
7	Win	7–0	Yudel Reyes	UD	12	5 April 2024	Centro Olimpico, Santo Domingo, Dominican Republic	Won WBA Gold light-flyweight title
6	Win	6–0	Orlando Pino	RTD	8 (10)	25 August 2023	Centro Olimpico, Santo Domingo, Dominican Republic	
5	Win	5–0	Vic Saludar	SD	12	21 December 2021	Hotel Catalonia Malecon Center, Santo Domingo, Dominican Republic	Won WBA (Regular) mini-flyweight title
4	Win	4–0	Ricardo Astuvilca	UD	12	21 July 2021	Pabellon de Boleibol, Santo Domingo, Dominican Republic	Won vacant WBA interim mini-flyweight title
3	Win	3–0	Kenny Cano	KO	3 (10), 0:20	12 March 2021	Hotel Catalonia Malecon Center, Santo Domingo, Dominican Republic	Retained WBA Fedelatin and WBC Latino mini-flyweight titles
2	Win	2–0	Byron Castellon	UD	10	16 December 2020	Hotel Catalonia Malecon Center, Santo Domingo, Dominican Republic	Retained WBA Fedelatin and WBC Latino mini-flyweight titles
1	Win	1–0	Oscar Bermudez Salas	UD	10	24 October 2020	Hotel Catalonia Malecon Center, Santo Domingo, Dominican Republic	Won vacant WBA Fedelatin and WBC Latino mini-flyweight titles

== See also ==
- List of male boxers
- List of southpaw stance boxers
- List of world mini-flyweight boxing champions
- List of world light-flyweight boxing champions

Sporting positions
Regional boxing titles
Vacant Title last held by Leyman Benavides	WBA Fedalatin mini-flyweight champion 24 October 2020 – 21 July 2021; Won interim title	Vacant
Vacant Title last held by Eliezer Gazo	WBC Latino mini-flyweight champion 24 October 2020 – 21 July 2021; Won interim title	Vacant Title next held by Brandon Moreno
New title	WBA Gold light-flyweight champion 5 April 2024 – 19 December 2024; Won world title	Vacant
World boxing titles
Vacant Title last held by Knockout CP Freshmart	WBA mini-flyweight champion Interim title 21 July – 25 August 2021; Stripped	Vacant
Preceded by Vic Saludar	WBA mini-flyweight champion Regular title 21 December 2021 – 15 January 2024; Vacated	Succeeded by Ryūsei Matsumoto
Vacant Title last held by Esteban Bermudez as Regular champion	WBA light-flyweight champion 19 December 2024 – 30 July 2025	Succeeded by Kyosuke Takami
