= Wilfredo Méndez =

Puerto Rican boxer (born 1996)

Wilfredo Méndez Figueroa
Personal information
- Nickname: Bimbito
- Nationality: Puerto Rican
- Born: 10 November 1996 (age 29) Caguas, Puerto Rico
- Height: 5 ft 4 1/2 in (164 cm)
- Weight: Mini flyweight

Boxing career
- Reach: 64 in (163 cm)
- Stance: Southpaw

Boxing record
- Total fights: 26
- Wins: 20
- Win by KO: 6
- Losses: 4
- Draws: 2

Wilfredo Méndez (born 10 November 1996) is a Puerto Rican professional boxer who held the WBO mini flyweight title between August 2019 to December 2021.

== Professional career ==
=== Early career ===
Méndez made his professional debut against Jean Carlos Molina on July 9, 2016. He won the fight by a second-right knockout. He won his next eight fights, amassing a professional record of 9-0 after his first two years as a professional.

Méndez was scheduled to fight Leyman Benavides on March 17, 2018, for the vacant WBA Fedelatin mini flyweight title. Benavides won the fight by unanimous decision. Méndez rebounded from this loss with a unanimous decision victory against Yenrry Bermudez.

Méndez was scheduled to fight Axel Aragon Vega on September 28, 2018, for the vacant WBO–NABO mini flyweight title. Following a sixth-round knockout of Armando Vazquez in a non-title bout on March 8, 2019, Méndez was scheduled to defend his WBO-NABO title against Janiel Rivera on May 24, 2019. He won the fight by split decision.

=== WBO mini flyweight champion ===
==== Méndez vs. Saludar ====
Méndez was scheduled to fight the reigning WBO mini-flyweight champion Vic Saludar on August 24, 2019. The fight was Saludar's second title defense and the first time that Méndez fought for a world title. Accordingly, Méndez came into the fight as the underdog to his more experienced opponent. Saludar's coach Jojo Palacios was unable to secure a working visa, while Saludar's manager Kenneth Rondal was also unable to go, as his father underwent brain surgery recently. As such, Saludar came into the fight without his usual corner. Throughout the bout, Méndez utilized outfighting tactics to keep distance from the pressuring Saludar, who scored the only knockdown of the fight in round 3. Despite being knocked down early in the fight, Méndez would nonetheless go on to win the fight by unanimous decision, with scores of 117–110, 115–112, 116–111.

==== Méndez vs. Vega ====
Méndez was scheduled to make his first title defense against Axel Aragon Vega on October 26, 2019. It was a rematch of their September 28, 2018 fight, which Méndez won by unanimous decision. Vega was at the time ranked #15 in WBO mini-flyweight rankings. Méndez utilized his significant reach and height advantage to keep control of the fight through the first three rounds, while Vega scored a knockdown in the fourth round. During the sixth round, Vega suffered a cut due to an accidental clash of heads. He was unable to continue at the start of the seventh round, which resulted in the bout going to a technical decision. Méndez won the fight by decision, with two of the judges scoring the fight 68-65 and 67–66 in his favor, while the third judge scored the fight 67-66 for Vega.

==== Méndez vs. Mendoza ====
For his second title defense, Méndez was scheduled to fight Gabriel Mendoza on February 8, 2020, who was at the time the #3 ranked fighter in The Ring 105 mini-flyweight rankings. Méndez dominated the fight, causing a cut above the right eye and a swelling on the forehead of Mendoza. He won the fight by a ninth-round technical knockout, as the referee judged Mendoza to have suffered too much damage throughout the bout. Méndez was scheduled to make his third title defense against Alexis Díaz on December 16, 2020. The bout was cancelled the day before the fight, after Méndez fell ill following the weigh-ins. Mendez was next scheduled to face Carlos Buitrago on August 14, 2021, at the Hotel El Panama in Panama City, Panama. Buitrago withdrew from the bout the day before the fight due to weight cut complications.

==== Méndez vs. Taniguchi ====
On October 7, 2021, the WBO ordered Méndez to make his third mini-flyweight title defense against the mandatory challenger Masataka Taniguchi. The pair was given a ten-day negotiation period to come to terms regarding the fight. As they were unable to come to terms, the fight was sent to a purse bid, with a minimum bid of $80,000. As no bids were placed, a second purse bid with a minimum of $40,000 was set for October 27. The WBO announced on October 27, 2021, that a successful purse bid was held. Méndez would face Taniguchi on December 14, 2021, on the undercard of the Naoya Inoue and Aran Dipaen bantamweight title bout. The bout took would take place at the Ryōgoku Kokugikan in Tokyo, Japan. Méndez lost the fight by an eleventh-round technical knockout. He suffered an early setback after being knocked down in the second round, and appeared to fall behind on the scorecards in the remaining rounds. After attempting to rally back in the tenth round, and briefly stunning Taniguchi, Méndez was finally stopped by a flurry of punches in the next round.

=== Continued mini-flyweight career ===
Méndez was booked to face Kenny Cano in a six-round mini-flyweight bout on April 8, 2022, at the Pabellon de Esgrima in Santo Domingo, Dominican Republic. Prior to this fight, Méndez switched camps and began training with the former three-time WBO junior lightweight world champion Román Martínez. He won the fight by a shutout unanimous decision, with all three judges scoring the bout 60–53 in his favor.

Méndez was expected to face Israel Vázquez on August 20, 2022, in the main event of "Sixt Boxing Nights". The bout was cancelled on August 14, after Méndez injured his knee in training. Méndez was instead booked to face Moises Caro Gutierrez on November 4, 2022. He won the fight by unanimous decision, with two scorecards of 97–91 and one scorecard of 99–89.

Méndez was expected to face the unbeaten Oscar Collazo in a WBO mini-flyweight title eliminator on January 28, 2023. The fight was scheduled for the undercard of the Alexis Rocha and Anthony Young welterweight bout, which took place at the YouTube Theater in Inglewood, California. Méndez withdrew from the fight on January 15, after suffering a back injury in training.

Méndez was scheduled to face the undefeated Yudai Shigeoka for the interim WBC mini flyweight championship on April 16, 2023, at the Yoyogi National Gymnasium in Tokyo, Japan. Méndez stepped in as a short-notice replacement for the champion Panya Pradabsri, who withdrew with a strep throat infection on April 4. He lost the fight by a seventh-round knockout.

On September 2, 2026, Méndez faced Takeshi Ishii for the vacant WBA mini-flyweight title at Yokohama Buntai in Yokohama, Japan, losing by knockout in the first round.

== Professional boxing record ==
26 fights	20 wins	4 losses
By knockout	6	3
By decision	14	1
Draws	2	

No.	Result	Record	Opponent	Type	Round, time	Date	Location	Notes
26	Loss	20–4–2	Takeshi Ishii	KO	1 (12), 2:23	Sep 2, 2026	Yokohama Buntai, Yokohama, Japan	For vacant WBA (Regular) mini-flyweight title
25	Draw	20–3–2	Andre Manuel Rodriguez Rayon	SD	10	Sep 20, 2025	Pandeportes, Coliseo de Combates, Panama City, Panama	
24	Win	20–3–1	Nelvis Rodriguez	UD	8	Feb 21, 2025	Cancha Rúben Zayas Montañez, Trujillo Alto, Puerto Rico	
23	Win	19–3–1	Jesús Haro	UD	12	Apr 20, 2024	Cancha Rúben Zayas Montañez, Trujillo Alto, Puerto Rico	
22	Draw	18–3–1	ArAr Andales	TD	4 (8), 2:23	Oct 7, 2023	Ota City General Gymnasium, Tokyo, Japan	
21	Loss	18–3	Yudai Shigeoka	KO	7 (12), 0:25	Apr 16, 2023	Yoyogi National Gymnasium, Tokyo, Japan	For interim WBC mini flyweight title
20	Win	18–2	Moises Caro Gutierrez	UD	10	Nov 4, 2022	Coliseo Carlos 'Teo' Cruz, Santo Domingo, Dominican Republic	
19	Win	17–2	Kenny Cano	UD	6	Apr 8, 2022	Pabellon de Esgrima, Santo Domingo, Dominican Republic	
18	Loss	16–2	Masataka Taniguchi	TKO	11 (12), 1:08	Dec 14, 2021	Ryōgoku Kokugikan, Tokyo, Japan	Lost WBO mini flyweight title
17	Win	16–1	Gabriel Mendoza	TKO	9 (12), 1:28	Feb 8, 2020	Hotel El Panama, Panama City, Panama	Retained WBO mini flyweight title
16	Win	15–1	Axel Aragon Vega	TD	7 (12), 0:19	Oct 26, 2019	Cancha Ruben Zayas Montanez, Trujillo Alto, Puerto Rico	Retained WBO mini flyweight title; Split TD after Vega cut from accidental head clash
15	Win	14–1	Vic Saludar	UD	12	Aug 24, 2019	Puerto Rico Convention Center, San Juan, Puerto Rico	Won WBO mini flyweight title
14	Win	13–1	Janiel Rivera	SD	10	May 24, 2019	Cancha Ruben Zayas Montanez, Trujillo Alto, Puerto Rico	Retained WBO–NABO mini flyweight title
13	Win	12–1	Armando Vazquez	KO	6 (8), 0:49	Mar 8, 2019	Cancha Ruben Zayas Montanez, Trujillo Alto, Puerto Rico	
12	Win	11–1	Axel Aragon Vega	UD	10	Sep 28, 2018	Cancha Ruben Zayas Montanez, Trujillo Alto, Puerto Rico	Won vacant WBO–NABO mini flyweight title
11	Win	10–1	Yenrry Bermudez	UD	8	Jul 27, 2018	Hotel El Prado, Barranquilla, Colombia	
10	Loss	9–1	Leyman Benavides	UD	11	Mar 17, 2018	Hotel Jaragua, Santo Domingo, Dominican Republic	For vacant WBA Fedelatin mini flyweight title
9	Win	9–0	Juan Guzman	RTD	2 (8), 3:00	Dec 22, 2017	Los Prados Social Club, Santo Domingo, Dominican Republic	
8	Win	8–0	Jose Adan Fernandez	UD	6	Jul 11, 2017	Casa de los Clubes, Santo Domingo, Dominican Republic	
7	Win	7–0	Ramon Emilio Cedano	UD	4	Jun 15, 2017	Casa de los Clubes, Santo Domingo, Dominican Republic	
6	Win	6–0	Starling Reyes	TKO	3 (4), 2:21	Apr 18, 2017	Casa de los Clubes, Santo Domingo, Dominican Republic	
5	Win	5–0	Jose Adan Fernandez	TKO	2 (6), 1:10	Mar 31, 2017	Coliseo Pepe Mayen, San Pedro de Macorís, Dominican Republic	
4	Win	4–0	Gustavo Ortiz	UD	6	Dec 10, 2016	Coliseo Cosme Beitia Salamo, Cataño, Puerto Rico	
3	Win	3–0	Jose Perdomo	UD	6	Sep 15, 2016	Gimnasio Pina Acevedo, Santo Domingo, Dominican Republic	
2	Win	2–0	Ramon Emilio Cedano	UD	6	Sep 9, 2016	Club Maquiteria, Santo Domingo, Dominican Republic	
1	Win	1–0	Jean Carlos Molina	KO	2 (4), 2:30	Jul 9, 2016	Cancha Ruben Zayas Montanez, Trujillo Alto, Puerto Rico	

== See also ==
- List of world mini-flyweight boxing champions
- List of Puerto Rican boxing world champions
- Sports in Puerto Rico
- List of southpaw stance boxers

Sporting positions
World boxing titles
Preceded by Vic Saludar	WBO mini flyweight champion August 24, 2019 – December 14, 2021	Succeeded by Masataka Taniguchi
