= Takeshi Ishii =

Japanese boxer (born 1999)

Takeshi Ishii 石井武志
Personal information
- Born: 26 October 1999 (age 26) Ukiha, Fukuoka, Japan
- Height: 1.56 m (5 ft 1 in)
- Weight: Mini-flyweight; Light-flyweight

Boxing career
- Reach: 156 cm (61 in)
- Stance: Orthodox

Boxing record
- Total fights: 13
- Wins: 12
- Win by KO: 9
- Losses: 1

Takeshi Ishii (石井武志, Ishii Takeshi; born 26 October 1999) is a Japanese professional boxer who has held the WBA (Regular) mini-flyweight title since September 2026.

== Kickboxing career ==
According to a report on fightnews.com, Ishii had a kickboxing career.

== Professional boxing career ==
=== Early career ===
Ishii made his professional boxing debut on 19 May 2022 at the Korakuen Hall in Tokyo, Japan against compatriot Takato Fukuda in a scheduled 4-rounds bout. Ishii won via 2nd-round TKO.

After a seven fight win streak, on 12 September 2023, Ishii lost via an upset against veteran Filipino Lito Dante via 8-rounds split decision. One judge scored it 77–75 in favour of Masuda, and the two other judges scored it 77–75 in favour of Dante, handing Masuda his first professional career loss.

==== OPBF mini flyweight champion ====
On 25 September 2024, Ishii was scheduled to face unbeaten Filipino John Kevin Jimenez for the vacant OPBF mini flyweight championship, which had been officially vacant for more than three years. Ishii won via narrow UD to claim the vacant title.

Ishii was scheduled to make the first defence of his OPBF title against 13–6–2 Japanese Shunsuke Isa on 11 March 2025 in Tokyo, Japan. Ishii won via fifth-round KO.

Ishii made the second defence of his OPBF title against multiple-time regional challenger Jake Amparo on 9 September 2025 in Tokyo, Japan, scheduled for 10 rounds. Ishii won via lop-sided UD.

=== WBA (Regular) mini flyweight champion ===
==== Ishii vs. Méndez ====
Following the uncertainty of fighting the then reigning WBA mini flyweight champion Oscar Collazo, Ishii was subsequently scheduled to face former WBO mini flyweight champion Wilfredo Méndez for the vacant 'Regular' title on 2 September 2026 at the Yokohama Buntai in Yokohama, Japan. Ishii won via quick first-round KO, finishing the bout within just 65 seconds, to claim the vacant world championship. This gave way for Ishii to obtain a new record, where he betters Naoya Inoue's record for Japan's fastest world title knockout.

== Professional boxing record ==
13 fights	12 wins	1 loss
By knockout	9	0
By decision	3	1

No.	Result	Record	Opponent	Type	Round, time	Date	Location	Notes
13	Win	12–1	Wilfredo Méndez	KO	1 (12), 1:05	2 Sep 2026	Yokohama Buntai, Yokohama, Japan	Won vacant WBA (Regular) mini-flyweight title
12	Win	11–1	Jake Amparo	UD	10	9 Sep 2025	Korakuen Hall, Tokyo, Japan	Retained OPBF mini-flyweight title
11	Win	10–1	Shunsuke Isa	KO	5 (12), 1:42	11 Mar 2025	Korakuen Hall, Tokyo, Japan	Retained OPBF mini-flyweight title
10	Win	9–1	John Kevin Jimenez	UD	12	25 Sep 2024	Korakuen Hall, Tokyo, Japan	Won vacant OPBF mini-flyweight title
9	Win	8–1	Prachanon Mingorancha	KO	3 (8), 2:18	9 Jul 2024	Korakuen Hall, Tokyo, Japan	
8	Loss	7–1	Lito Dante	SD	8	12 Sep 2023	Korakuen Hall, Tokyo, Japan	
7	Win	7–0	Natchaphon Wichaita	KO	2 (8), 0:39	29 Jun 2023	Korakuen Hall, Tokyo, Japan	
6	Win	6–0	Jinnawat Rienpith	TKO	1 (6), 0:23	14 Mar 2023	Korakuen Hall, Tokyo, Japan	
5	Win	5–0	Masashi Ikeda	TKO	1 (5), 2:59	17 Dec 2022	Korakuen Hall, Tokyo, Japan	
4	Win	4–0	Kenta Kawakami	UD	4	3 Nov 2022	Korakuen Hall, Tokyo, Japan	
3	Win	3–0	Andy Atsushi	TKO	1 (4), 2:16	27 Sep 2022	Korakuen Hall, Tokyo, Japan	
2	Win	2–0	Yoshiki Iwai	TKO	4 (4), 1:29	2 Aug 2022	Shinjuku FACE, Tokyo, Japan	
1	Win	1–0	Takato Fukuda	TKO	2 (4), 2:05	19 May 2022	Korakuen Hall, Tokyo, Japan	

Sporting positions
Regional boxing titles
Vacant Title last held by Melvin Jerusalem	OPBF mini flyweight champion September 25, 2024 – 2026; Vacated	Vacant Title next held by Takero Kitano
World boxing titles
Vacant Title last held by Ryūsei Matsumoto	WBA mini-flyweight champion Regular title September 2, 2026 – present	Incumbent
