= Boxing at the 2010 Asian Games – Men's 49 kg =

Boxing competitions

Men's 49 kg at the 2010 Asian Games
- Venue: Lingnan Mingzhu Gymnasium
- Date: 18–26 November 2010
- Competitors: 19 from 19 nations

Medalists
| gold medal | Zou Shiming | China |
| silver medal | Birzhan Zhakypov | Kazakhstan |
| bronze medal | Amnat Ruenroeng | Thailand |
| bronze medal | Vic Saludar | Philippines |

The men's light flyweight (49 kilograms) event at the 2010 Asian Games took place from 18 to 26 November 2010 at Lingnan Mingzhu Gymnasium, Foshan, China.

== Schedule ==
All times are China Standard Time (UTC+08:00)

| Date | Time | Event |
|---|---|---|
| Thursday, 18 November 2010 | 19:00 | Round of 32 |
| Saturday, 20 November 2010 | 14:00 | Round of 16 |
| Monday, 22 November 2010 | 19:00 | Quarterfinals |
| Wednesday, 24 November 2010 | 19:00 | Semifinals |
| Friday, 26 November 2010 | 19:00 | Final |

== Results ==
Legend

- RSC — Won by referee stop contest

=== Final ===
| Final |
| Zou Shiming (CHN) | 9 |
| Birzhan Zhakypov (KAZ) | 5 |

=== Top half ===
Round of 32

Round of 16
Azat Usenaliev (KGZ) | 1
Amnat Ruenroeng (THA) | 9
Sung Song-guk (PRK) | 15
Chaminda Tennakoon (SRI) | 2
Abilio dos Santos (TLS)
Hatsanai Phoilevy (LAO) | RSC
Jasurbek Latipov (UZB) | 2
Zou Shiming (CHN) | 9

Quarterfinals
Amnat Ruenroeng (THA) | 12
Sung Song-guk (PRK) | 3
Hatsanai Phoilevy (LAO) | 1
Zou Shiming (CHN) | 13

Semifinals
Amnat Ruenroeng (THA) | 2
Zou Shiming (CHN) | 5

=== Bottom half ===
Round of 32
Mohd Fuad Redzuan (MAS) | 1
Vic Saludar (PHI) | 8
Fahad Al-Faifi (KSA)
Amandeep Singh (IND) | RSC
Muhammad Waseem (PAK) | 3
Masoud Rigi (IRI) | 1

Round of 16
Mohammad Aref Nazari (AFG) | 3
Shin Jong-hun (KOR) | 13
Birzhan Zhakypov (KAZ) | 9
Pürevdorjiin Serdamba (MGL) | 0
Zarip Jumaýew (TKM) | 3
Vic Saludar (PHI) | 12
Amandeep Singh (IND) | 11
Muhammad Waseem (PAK) | 0

Quarterfinals
Shin Jong-hun (KOR) | 3
Birzhan Zhakypov (KAZ) | 17
Vic Saludar (PHI) | 6
Amandeep Singh (IND) | 1

Semifinals
Birzhan Zhakypov (KAZ) | 12
Vic Saludar (PHI) | 1
