= Gilberto Mendoza Jr. =

Panamanian sportsman

- Born: Gilberto Jesus Mendoza; 25 December 1970 (age 55); Panama
- Occupation: Boxing official

Gilberto Jesus "Gilbertico" Mendoza (born 25 December 1970) is a Panamanian sports administrator. Mendoza is, since December of 2015, the president of the Panama based World Boxing Association, which is, along with the United States based International Boxing Federation, the Mexico based World Boxing Council and the Puerto Rico based World Boxing Organization, one of the four major international boxing championship recognizing groups.

== WBA president ==
On 28 May 2021, it was announced that Mendoza had been reelected as president of the WBA for the period from 2021 to 2025.

== Personal ==
Mendoza is the son of the previous WBA president, Gilberto Mendoza.

== See also ==
- Mauricio Sulaiman
- List of Panamanians
