= Vic Saludar =

Filipino boxer

Personal information
- Nickname: Vicious
- Born: Victorio Miranda Saludar; 3 November 1990 (age 36) Polomolok, Philippines
- Height: 5 ft 3 in (160 cm)
- Weight: Mini-flyweight

Boxing career
- Reach: 65 1/2 in (166 cm)
- Stance: Orthodox

Boxing record
- Total fights: 34
- Wins: 28
- Win by KO: 18
- Losses: 6
Medal record
Men's amateur boxing
Representing Philippines
Asian Games
Bronze medal – third place	2010 Guangzhou	Light-flyweight

Victorio Miranda Saludar (born 3 November 1990) is a Filipino professional boxer who held the WBO mini-flyweight title from 2018 to 2019 and the WBA (Regular) mini-flyweight title in 2021.

== Amateur career ==
Saludar was a successful amateur. He's a six-time national amateur champion in the flyweight division, and he won a bronze medal at the 2010 Asian Games, after losing in the semifinals to Birzhan Zhakypov. Saludar's two brothers are also boxers. Rey Saludar won a gold medal at the 2010 Asian Games, and Froilan Saludar is a former world-title challenger.

== Professional career ==
=== Early career ===
Saludar made his professional debut against Juanito Hundante on 13 July 2013, and won the fight by a first-round technical knockout. He amassed an 11–1 record during the next two years, most notably defeating Rizky Pratama by a first-round technical knockout to win the vacant WBO Asia Pacific mini-flyweight title.

=== WBO mini flyweight champion ===
Saludar was scheduled to challenge the reigning WBO mini flyweight champion Ryuya Yamanaka, in the latter's second title defense. The fight was scheduled for 13 July 2018, to be contested at the Central Gym in Kobe, Japan. Saludar was at the time the #3 ranked WBO mini flyweight contender. He won the fight by unanimous decision, with scores of 116–111, 117-110 and 115–112. Saludar knocked Yamanaka with a straight right in the seventh round and had, by the end of the bout, opened a cut above Yamanaka's left eye.

Saludar made his first WBO mini flyweight title defense against Masataka Taniguchi on 26 February 2019, at the Korakuen Hall in Tokyo, Japan. He won the fight by a wide unanimous decision, with two judges scoring the fight 117–111 in his favor, while the third judge awarded him a 118-110 scorecard.

Saludar made his second WBO title defense against Wilfredo Méndez on 24 August 2019, at the Puerto Rico Convention Center in San Juan, Puerto Rico. Saludar was seen as the favorite to retain the title when the bout was first scheduled. Saludar entered the bout without his usual cornermen, as his coach Jojo Palacios was unable to secure a working visa, while his manager Kenneth Rondal was forced to stay in the Philippines due to his father's recent brain surgery. Mendez won the fight by unanimous decision, with scores of 117–110, 115–112, 116–111.

=== WBA Regular champion ===
Saludar was scheduled to face Mike Kinaadman in his first post-title fight on 21 December 2019, and was held at the Enan Chiong Activity Center in Naga, Philippines. He suffered a flash knockdown in the first round, but quickly rebounded to stop Kinaadman by knockout in the sixth round.

Saludar was scheduled to face Robert Paradero for the vacant WBA Regular mini-flyweight title on 19 February 2021, at the Biñan Football Stadium in Biñan, Philippines. The fight was originally planned for 26 September 2020, in Manila, but was eventually pushed back due to the COVID-19 pandemic. Saludar won the fight by split decision, with two judges awarding Saludar 115-113 and 116-112 scorecards, while the third judge score the bout 118-110 for Paradero.

On 30 August 2021, the WBA ordered Saludar to face the number 1 ranked mini flyweight contender Erick Rosa in a mandatory title fight. The two of them were given 30 days to negotiate the terms of the bout, before it would head to a purse bid. They came to terms on 9 September, and announced the fight for 9 December 2021, to be held in Santo Domingo, Dominican Republic. The fight was later postponed for 21 December 2021 Saludar lost the fight by split decision, with scores of 109–116, 112-113 and 113–112.

=== Later mini flyweight career ===
Saludar faced Oscar Collazo in a WBA mini-flyweight title eliminator on the undercard of the Javier Fortuna lightweight bout, which took place on 16 July 2022. He lost the fight by unanimous decision, with score of 116–112, 116–112 and 118–110.

Saludar faced Ariston Aton for the vacant Asian Boxing Federation minimumweight title on 21 December 2021. He captured the vacant belt by a seventh-round knockout.

== Professional boxing record ==
34 fights	28 wins	6 losses
By knockout	18	2
By decision	10	4

No.	Result	Record	Opponent	Type	Round, time	Date	Location	Notes
34	Win	28–6	Richard Garde	TKO	5 (10), 2:14	7 Nov 2026	Ho Chi Minh City, The Grand Ho Tram, Vietnam	Won vacant WBO International Minimumweight title
33	Win	27–6	Suriya Puttaluksa	TKO	3 (10), 2:37	19 Oct 2025	Halla Gymnasium, Jeju, South Korea	
32	Win	26–6	Roldan Sasan	KO	4 (10), 0:48	8 Feb 2025	Nustar Resort and Casino, Cebu City, Philippines	
31	Win	25–6	Sanchai Yotboon	KO	1 (12), 0:37	1 May 2024	Sports and Cultural Complex, Mandaue, Philippines	Won vacant WBO Oriental mini-flyweight title
30	Win	24–6	Francis Jay Diaz	TKO	6 (10), 2:32	16 Dec 2023	Naga Sports Complex, Naga City, Philippines	
29	Win	23–6	Clyde Azarcon	TKO	2 (10), 0:54	8 Oct 2023	Iligan City Public Plaza, Iligan City, Philippines	
28	Win	22–6	Ariston Aton	KO	7 (10), 2:55	21 Dec 2022	Enan Chiong Activity Center, Naga City, Philippines	Won vacant ABF mini-flyweight title
27	Loss	21–6	Oscar Collazo	UD	12	16 Jul 2022	Crypto.com Arena, Los Angeles, California, U.S.	
26	Loss	21–5	Erick Rosa	SD	12	21 Dec 2021	Hotel Catalonia Malecon Center, Santo Domingo, Dominican Republic	Lost WBA (Regular) mini-flyweight title
25	Win	21–4	Robert Paradero	SD	12	20 Feb 2021	Football Stadium, Biñan, Philippines	Won vacant WBA (Regular) mini-flyweight title
24	Win	20–4	Mike Kinaadman	KO	6 (10), 2:04	21 Dec 2019	Enan Chiong Activity Center, Naga, Philippines	
23	Loss	19–4	Wilfredo Méndez	UD	12	24 Aug 2019	Puerto Rico Convention Center, San Juan, Puerto Rico	Lost WBO mini-flyweight title
22	Win	19–3	Masataka Taniguchi	UD	12	26 Feb 2019	Korakuen Hall, Tokyo, Japan	Retained WBO mini-flyweight title
21	Win	18–3	Ryuya Yamanaka	UD	12	13 Jul 2018	Central Gym, Kobe, Japan	Won WBO mini-flyweight title
20	Win	17–3	Mike Kinaadman	KO	7 (10), 1:52	3 Apr 2018	Municipal Gymnasium, Manolo Fortich, Philippines	
19	Win	16–3	Lito Dante	UD	10	23 Dec 2017	Enan Chiong Activity Center, Naga, Philippines	
18	Win	15–3	Mike Kinaadman	UD	8	30 Aug 2017	Barangay Bulua Covered Court, Cagayan de Oro, Philippines	
17	Loss	14–3	Toto Landero	SD	10	10 Jun 2017	Sports and Cultural Complex, Mandaue, Philippines	
16	Win	14–2	Powell Balaba	UD	6	1 Mar 2017	Barangay Bulua Covered Court, Cagayan de Oro, Philippines	
15	Win	13–2	Jimboy Haya	UD	12	28 Oct 2016	Barangay Bulua Covered Court, Cagayan de Oro, Philippines	Won vacant WBO Oriental mini-flyweight title
14	Win	12–2	Lito Dante	UD	10	2 Apr 2016	Oval Plaza Gym, General Santos, Philippines	Retained WBO Asia Pacific mini-flyweight title
13	Loss	11–2	Kosei Tanaka	KO	6 (12), 2:15	31 Dec 2015	Aichi Prefectural Gymnasium, Nagoya, Japan	For WBO mini-flyweight title
12	Win	11–1	Rizky Pratama	TKO	1 (12), 1:02	9 Sep 2015	Polomolok Gym, Polomolok, Philippines	Won vacant WBO Asia Pacific mini-flyweight title
11	Win	10–1	Michael Kaibigan	KO	4 (8), 1:54	11 Jul 2015	Waterfront Hotel & Casino, Cebu City, Philippines	
10	Win	9–1	Lyster Jun Pronco	UD	8	7 Feb 2015	University of SouthEastern Philippines Gym, Davao City, Philippines	
9	Win	8–1	Sherwin McDo Lungay	TKO	1 (8), 1:17	7 Dec 2014	Central Market Gym, Iligan, Philippines	
8	Win	7–1	JR Salvador	UD	8	4 Oct 2014	Macasanding Covered Court, Cagayan de Oro, Philippines	
7	Win	6–1	Belmar Plaza	KO	4 (8), 2:59	16 Aug 2014	Macasandig Gym, Cagayan de Oro, Philippines	
6	Win	5–1	Mateo Jasma	TKO	1 (6), 0:55	5 Jun 2014	Convention & Sports Center, Dipolog, Philippines	
5	Win	4–1	Rey Morano	KO	1 (6), 1:26	12 Apr 2014	Macasandig Gym, Cagayan de Oro, Philippines	
4	Win	3–1	Philip Luis Cuerdo	TKO	4 (6), 2:38	1 Mar 2014	Solaire Resort & Casino, Parañaque, Philippines	
3	Loss	2–1	Powell Balaba	RTD	4 (6), 3:00	23 Nov 2013	City Hall Grounds, Cagayan de Oro, Philippines	
2	Win	2–0	Camilo Rey Seneres	TKO	1 (4), 1:08	14 Sep 2013	Molo Covered Gym, Brgy., Iloilo City, Philippines	
1	Win	1–0	Juanito Hundante	TKO	1 (4), 0:52	13 Jul 2013	Solaire Resort Hotel and Casino, Pasay, Philippines	

== Personal life ==
Saludar has a wife named Jonalyn. He also has a son and a daughter.

== See also ==
- List of mini-flyweight boxing champions
- History of boxing in the Philippines

Sporting positions
World boxing titles
Preceded by Ryuya Yamanaka	WBO mini-flyweight champion 13 July 2018 – 24 August 2019	Succeeded by Wilfredo Mendez
Vacant Title last held by Knockout CP Freshmart	WBA mini-flyweight champion Regular title 20 February 2021 – 21 December 2021	Succeeded by Erick Rosa
