= Kai Ishizawa =

Japanese boxer (born 1996)

Personal information
- Nationality: Japanese
- Born: 石澤開; 23 November 1996 (age 29) Sagamihara, Japan
- Height: 5 ft 1.5 in (156 cm)
- Weight: Mini-flyweight

Boxing career
- Stance: Orthodox

Boxing record
- Total fights: 15
- Wins: 11
- Win by KO: 10
- Losses: 4

Kai Ishizawa (born 23 November 1996) is a Japanese professional boxer. He is a one-time world title challenger, having fought for the WBO mini flyweight title in 2022.

== Personal life ==
Ishizawa played soccer and practiced karate in elementary school and took up boxing in the first grade of junior high school. He was the captain of the boxing club in Buso Junior High School.

Ishizawa graduated from the Nippon Sport Science University.

== Professional career ==
Ishizawa made his professional debut on June 3, 2017, with a second-round knockout of fellow debutante Phongsaphon Panyakum. Ishizawa followed this up with stoppage victories of Yoshimitsu Kushibe on August 4, 2017, Narathip Sungsut on January 30, 2018, and Tatsuro Nakashima on August 4, 2018. These four victories earned him the chance to fight Daiki Tomita for the inaugural Japanese Youth minimumweight championship. He was later forced to withdraw due to an injury.

After recovering from his injury, Ishizawa was scheduled to fight the undefeated Yuga Inoue for the inaugural Japanese minimumweight championship on November 10, 2018. He won the fight by a sixth-round technical knockout.

Ishizawa was scheduled to fight the Indonesian national mini-flyweight champion Silem Serang on June 1, 2019. He won the fight by a fourth-round technical knockout, stopping Serang with eight seconds left in the round. Ishizawa was next scheduled to face Masataka Taniguchi, in a Japanese minimumweight title eliminator match, on September 21, 2019. Taniguchi won the fight by unanimous decision, with scores of 77–74, 77-74 and 78–74.

Ishizawa rebounded from his first professional loss with a sixth-round technical knockout of Masashi Tada on October 13, 2020. Ishizawa was next scheduled to fight Yuni Takada for the Japanese Youth minimumweight title on April 21, 2021. He won the fight by majority decision, with scores of 78–74, 76-76 and 79–73.

Ishizawa was scheduled to face Naoya Haruguchi on October 8, 2021, in a Japanese minimumweight title eliminator match. He won the fight by a fourth-round technical knockout.

Ishizawa was scheduled to face the undefeated Katsuki Mori for the Japanese minumweight title in the main event of "Phoenix Battle 83" at the Korakuen Hall in Tokyo, Japan on January 11, 2022. He won the fight by an eight-round technical knockout. Ishizawa dropped Mori to the canvas with a flurry of punches, which prompted his corner to throw in the towel. Ishizawa called out the reigning WBO mini-flyweight champion Masataka Taniguchi during his post-fight interview.

Ishizawa is booked to challenge the reigning WBO mini-flyweight champion Masataka Taniguchi on 22 April 2022, in the main event of a Hikari TV broadcast PBX card, which will take place at the Korakuen Hall in Tokyo, Japan. The bout is a rematch of their September 21, 2019 meeting, which Taniguchi won by unanimous decision. Ishizawa vacated the Japanese minimumweight title on 3 March. Ishizawa failed to make weight for the title bout, as he weighed in 2.5 kg over the championship limit in his first attempt and 2.3 kg over the limit in his second attempt. Ishizawa was allowed to compete after making 49.9 kg on the day of the fight, although he was ineligible to win the title. He lost the fight by an eleventh-round technical knockout, and was down on all three of the judges scorecards at the time of the stoppage.

On July 19, 2022, it was announced that JBC had handed Ishizawa a six-month ban for missing weight against Taniguchi. The suspension was backed dated to April 22 and was accompanied by a strict caution by his gym and gym manager. Ishizawa was booked to face Jaysever Abcede on June 12, 2023, after serving out his ban from professional competition. He won the fight by a fifth-round knockout.

== Professional boxing record ==
15 fights	11 wins	4 losses
By knockout	10	2
By decision	1	2

No.	Result	Record	Opponent	Type	Round, time	Date	Location	Notes
15	Loss	11–4	Regie Suganob	TKO	8 (12), 2:38	30 Apr 2024	Holy Name University Gymnasium, Tagbilaran City, Philippines	For WBO Global light flyweight title
14	Loss	11–3	Vince Paras	SD	8	12 Oct 2023	Ariake Arena, Tokyo, Japan	
13	Win	11–2	Jaysever Abcede	KO	5 (8), 2:37	12 Jun 2023	Korakuen Hall, Tokyo, Japan	
12	Loss	10–2	Masataka Taniguchi	TKO	11 (12), 2:29	22 Apr 2022	Korakuen Hall, Tokyo, Japan	WBO minimumweight title only at stake for Taniguchi as Ishizawa fails to make weight
11	Win	10–1	Katsuki Mori	KO	8 (10), 2:50	11 Jan 2022	Korakuen Hall, Tokyo, Japan	Won Japanese minimumweight title
10	Win	9–1	Naoya Haruguchi	TKO	4 (8), 1:21	8 Oct 2021	Korakuen Hall, Tokyo, Japan	
9	Win	8–1	Yuni Takada	MD	8	21 Apr 2021	Korakuen Hall, Tokyo, Japan	Retained Japanese Youth minimumweight title
8	Win	7–1	Masashi Tada	TKO	6 (8), 1:41	13 Oct 2020	Korakuen Hall, Tokyo, Japan	
7	Loss	6–1	Masataka Taniguchi	UD	8	21 Sep 2019	Korakuen Hall, Tokyo, Japan	
6	Win	6–0	Silem Serang	TKO	4 (8), 2:52	1 Jun 2019	Korakuen Hall, Tokyo, Japan	
5	Win	5–0	Yuga Inoue	TKO	6 (8), 0:46	10 Nov 2018	Korakuen Hall, Tokyo, Japan	Won inaugural Japanese Youth minimumweight title
4	Win	4–0	Tatsuro Nakashima	TKO	5 (6), 1:35	8 Apr 2018	City Gym, Tomigusuku, Okinawa, Japan	
3	Win	3–0	Narathip Sungsut	KO	1 (6), 2:36	30 Jan 2018	Korakuen Hall, Tokyo, Japan	
2	Win	2–0	Yoshimitsu Kushibe	TKO	2 (4), 0:44	4 Aug 2017	Korakuen Hall, Tokyo, Japan	
1	Win	1–0	Phongsaphon Panyakum	KO	2 (6), 1:03	3 Jun 2017	Korakuen Hall, Tokyo, Japan	
