= Masataka Taniguchi =

Japanese boxer (born 1994)

Personal information
- Born: 谷口将隆; 19 January 1994 (age 32) Kobe, Japan
- Height: 5 ft 4 in (163 cm)
- Weight: Mini-flyweight; Light-flyweight

Boxing career
- Reach: 64 1/2 in (164 cm)
- Stance: Southpaw

Boxing record
- Total fights: 28
- Wins: 22
- Win by KO: 16
- Losses: 6

Masataka Taniguchi (谷口将隆; born 19 January 1994) is a Japanese professional boxer who held the WBO mini-flyweight title from 2021 to 2023.

== Professional career ==
=== Early career ===
==== Career beginnings ====
Taniguchi made his professional debut against Thawi Chaisat on 3 April 2016, and won the fight by a first-round knockout. He amassed an 8–1 record over the next 15 months, achieving six of those victories by stoppage.

Taniguchi challenged the reigning OPBF mini-flyweight titlist Tsubasa Koura on 11 November 2017. He lost the fight by majority decision. Two judges scored the fight for Koura as 115-114 and 115–113, while the third judge scored it as a 114–114 draw.

Following his failed OPBF title bid, Taniguchi faced Patiphan Prajuabsook on 31 December 2017. He won the fight by a third-round technical knockout. Taniguchi was next scheduled to face Reymark Taday on 8 February 2018, and won the fight by a sixth-round technical decision. Taniguchi fought Joel Lino for the vacant WBO Asia Pacific mini-flyweight title on 13 November 2018. He won the fight by unanimous decision. Two judges scored eleven of the twelve rounds for Taniguchi, while the third judge scored it 116-112 for him.

These three victories earned Taniguchi the change to challenge the reigning WBO mini-flyweight champion Vic Saludar, in the latter's first title defense, on 26 February 2019. Saludar won the fight by unanimous decision, with two judges scoring the fight 117–111 in his favor, while the third judge awarded him a 118-110 scorecard.

Taniguchi was scheduled to face the undefeated prospect Kai Ishizawa on 21 September 2019. He won the eight-round bout by unanimous decision, with scores of 77–74, 77-74 and 78–74.

==== Japanese mini-flyweight champion ====
Taniguchi was scheduled to fight Hizuki Saso for the vacant Japanese mini-flyweight title on 3 December 2020. He won the fight by a tenth-round technical knockout, and was awarded all nine prior rounds by two of the three judges, while the third scored eight of the nine rounds for Taniguchi. Taniguchi made his first Japanese mini-flyweight title defense against Tatsuro Nakashima on 7 June 2021. He dominated the bout, winning all four rounds prior to the fifth-round technical knockout of Nakashima.

=== WBO mini-flyweight champion ===
==== Taniguchi vs. Méndez ====
On 7 October 2021, the WBO ordered Wilfredo Méndez to make his third mini-flyweight title defense against the mandatory challenger Masataka Taniguchi. On 27 October 2021, a successful purse bid was held, which had a minimum bid of $40,000. The bout would take place on 14 December 2021, at the Ryōgoku Kokugikan in Tokyo, Japan. Taniguchi won the fight by an eleventh-round technical knockout. He first knocked Méndez down with a left straight in the second round, which put him in an early point lead, which was made greater after Méndez was deducted a point in the sixth round for excessive holding. Taniguchi upped his output in the eleventh round, forcing referee Nobuto Ikehara to stop the fight with a flurry of punches to which the cornered Méndez did not respond.

==== Taniguchi vs. Ishizawa ====
Taniguchi was booked to make his first WBO mini-flyweight title defense against Kai Ishizawa on 22 April 2022, in the main event of PBX Phoenix Battle 87, which was broadcast as a pay per view by Abema TV. The bout was a rematch of their 21 September 2019 meeting, which Taniguchi won by unanimous decision. It took place at the Korakuen Hall in Tokyo, Japan. Although Taniguchi weighed in at 47.6 kg, 0.2 below the championship limit, Ishizawa came in 2.5 kg above the limit. Ishizawa failed to make weight in his second attempt as well, as he weighed in at 49.9 kg. Ishizawa was allowed to compete after making 49.9 kg on the day of the fight, although he was ineligible to win the title. Taniguchi retained the belt by an eleventh-round technical knockout, forcing a referee stoppage with a flurry of punches at the 2:29 minute mark of the penultimate round. He was leading on the scorecards at the time of the stoppage, with all three judges having scored the fight 99–91 in his favor.

==== Taniguchi vs. Jerusalem ====
Taniguchi is scheduled to make his second WBO championship defense against the one-time WBC mini-flyweight title challenger Melvin Jerusalem. The bout was scheduled as the main event of "3150 FIGHT vol.4" and took place at the Osaka Prefectural Gymnasium in Osaka, Japan on 6 January 2023. It was broadcast by Abema TV. Taniguchi lost the fight by a second-round technical knockout. He was dropped with a one-two combination near the beginning of the round and remained unsteady on his feet despite beating the ten-count, which prompted referee Roberto Ramirez Jr. to wave the bout off.

=== Light flyweight ===
==== Taniguchi vs. Horikawa ====
Taniguchi made his light flyweight debut against the former OPBF and Japanese light flyweight champion Kenichi Horikawa on 5 August 2023, at the Korakuen Hall in Tokyo, Japan in the main event of a U-Next broadcast show. He won the fight by majority decision, with two scorecards of 96–94 in his favor and one even 95–95 scorecard. Taniguchi revealed that he had suffered a broken jaw in the fifth round during a post-fight interview. He successfully underwent surgery on 9 August. Taniguchi fully recovered by the end of February 2024, when he was permitted by his physician to once again train and spar at full intensity.

==== Taniguchi vs. Abcede ====
On 17 April 2024, Taniguchi's representatives Treasure Boxing Promotion held a press conference at the Watanabe Gym in Shinagawa to announce he would face Jaysever Abcede on 11 May 2024. The contest will take place at the Paradise City Grand Ballroom in Incheon, South Korea, as an undercard fight for the flyweight bout between Hiroto Kyoguchi and Vince Paras. He won via technical knockout in the fifth round.

==== Taniguchi vs. Santiago ====
Taniguchi challenged WBO and WBA light-flyweight champion René Santiago of Puerto Rico at Korakuen Hall in Tokyo, Japan, on 3 April 2026. Taniguchi was dropped in the fifth round and lost a unanimous decision.

== Professional boxing record ==
28 fights	22 wins	6 losses
By knockout	16	1
By decision	6	5

No.	Result	Record	Opponent	Type	Round, time	Date	Location	Notes
28	Win	22–6	Erson Trinidad	KO	6 (8)	4 Nov 2026	Korakuen Hall, Tokyo, Japan	
27	Loss	21–6	René Santiago	UD	12	3 Apr 2026	Korakuen Hall, Tokyo, Japan	For WBA and WBO light-flyweight titles
26	Win	21–5	Takeru Inoue	TKO	5 (12), 0:43	3 Aug 2025	Sumiyoshi Ward Center, Osaka, Japan	Won vacant OPBF and Japanese light-flyweight titles
25	Win	20–5	Condor Inaba	TKO	3 (8), 0:30	20 May 2025	Korakuen Hall, Tokyo, Japan	
24	Loss	19–5	Thanongsak Simsri	SD	12	15 Dec 2024	Sumiyoshi Sports Center, Osaka, Japan	For OPBF light-flyweight title
23	Win	19–4	Paipharob Kokietgym	KO	6 (8), 1:58	13 Oct 2024	Yokohama Budokan, Yokohama, Japan	
22	Win	18–4	Jaysever Abcede	TKO	5 (8), 1:14	11 May 2024	PARADISE CITY, Incheon, South Korea	
21	Win	17–4	Kenichi Horikawa	MD	10	5 Aug 2023	Korakuen Hall, Tokyo, Japan	
20	Loss	16–4	Melvin Jerusalem	TKO	2 (12) 1:04	6 Jan 2023	Osaka Prefectural Gymnasium, Osaka, Japan	Lost WBO mini-flyweight title
19	Win	16–3	Kai Ishizawa	TKO	11 (12), 2:29	22 Apr 2022	Korakuen Hall, Tokyo, Japan	Retained WBO mini-flyweight title
18	Win	15–3	Wilfredo Méndez	TKO	11 (12), 1:08	14 Dec 2021	Ryōgoku Kokugikan, Tokyo, Japan	Won WBO mini-flyweight title
17	Win	14–3	Tatsuro Nakashima	TKO	5 (10), 1:35	7 Jun 2021	Korakuen Hall, Tokyo, Japan	Retained Japanese mini-flyweight title
16	Win	13–3	Hizuki Saso	TKO	10 (10), 0:37	3 Dec 2020	Korakuen Hall, Tokyo, Japan	Won vacant Japanese mini-flyweight title
15	Win	12–3	Kai Ishizawa	UD	8	21 Sep 2019	Korakuen Hall, Tokyo, Japan	
14	Loss	11–3	Vic Saludar	UD	12	26 Feb 2019	Korakuen Hall, Tokyo, Japan	For WBO mini-flyweight title
13	Win	11–2	Joel Lino	UD	12	13 Nov 2018	Ram 100 Thai Boxing Stadium, Bangkok, Thailand	Won vacant WBO Asia Pacific mini-flyweight title
12	Win	10–2	Reymark Taday	TD	6 (8), 2:16	9 Feb 2018	Korakuen Hall, Tokyo, Japan	
11	Win	9–2	Patiphan Prajuabsook	TKO	3 (8), 1:56	31 Dec 2017	Ota City General Gymnasium, Tokyo, Japan	
10	Loss	8–2	Tsubasa Koura	MD	12	11 Nov 2017	Korakuen Hall, Tokyo, Japan	For OPBF mini-flyweight title
9	Win	8–1	Narathip Sungsut	TKO	1 (8), 2:05	30 Jul 2017	Sumiyoshi Ward Center, Osaka, Japan	
8	Win	7–1	Benjie Bartolome	RTD	1 (6), 3:00	27 Jun 2017	Makati Cinema Square Boxing Arena, Makati, Philippines	
7	Loss	6–1	Reiya Konishi	MD	10	9 Apr 2017	Osaka Prefectural Gymnasium, Osaka, Japan	For vacant Japanese mini-flyweight title
6	Win	6–0	Vincent Bautista	UD	6	31 Dec 2016	Ota City General Gymnasium, Tokyo, Japan	
5	Win	5–0	Dexter Alimento	SD	8	13 Oct 2016	Korakuen Hall, Tokyo, Japan	
4	Win	4–0	Chaowalit Choedram	TKO	4 (8), 1:32	7 Aug 2016	Osaka Prefectural Gymnasium, Osaka, Japan	
3	Win	3–0	Joey Bactul	KO	2 (8), 1:41	19 Jun 2016	Maasim Municipal Gymnasium, Maasim, Philippines	
2	Win	2–0	Nonthawat Phengkrajang	TKO	1 (6), 1:30	16 May 2016	Meenayothin Camp, Bangkok, Thailand	
1	Win	1–0	Thawi Chaisat	KO	1 (6), 1:58	3 Apr 2016	Osaka Prefectural Gymnasium, Osaka, Japan	

== See also ==
- List of world mini-flyweight boxing champions
- List of Japanese boxing world champions

Sporting positions
World boxing titles
Preceded by Wilfredo Méndez	WBO mini-flyweight champion 14 December 2021 – 6 January 2023	Succeeded by Melvin Jerusalem
