= Gilberto Mendoza =

Venezuelan boxer

President of the World Boxing Association
- In office October 7, 1982 – December 14, 2015
- Preceded by: Rodrigo Sanchez
- Succeeded by: Gilberto Mendoza, Jr.

Personal details
- Born: Francisco Gilberto Mendoza; March 30, 1943 Barquisimeto, Lara State, Venezuela
- Died: March 11, 2016 (aged 72) Caracas, Capital District, Venezuela
- Education: Andrés Bello Catholic University; University of Toledo

Gilberto Mendoza (March 30, 1943 – March 11, 2016) was a Venezuelan-Panamanian former amateur boxer and sports executive who served as president of the World Boxing Association (WBA), the oldest of the four major professional boxing world championship recognizing organizations. He served from 1982 until stepping down in December 2015. He continued as President Emeritus until his death.

== Early life ==
Mendoza was born in Barquisimeto, Venezuela in 1943. He grew up under difficult circumstances and found success playing baseball and soccer. However, boxing became his passion. He was a bantamweight amateur fighter for three years while attending college in Caracas. He moved from Venezuela to the United States to pursue his master's degree at the University of Toledo.

== Career ==
Mendoza served as Chairman of the WBA Ratings Committee from October 1978 to 1979. During this time, he led the committee in writing the Norms and Procedures for Ratings, which established rules for the sport. This manual became known as "Mendoza's Manual for Ratings" in recognition.

Shortly before his death, then-WBA President Rodrigo Sanchez nominated Mendoza for the position when it became clear to Sanchez that he would not be able to continue his duties. Sanchez died in 1982, and Mendoza was elected President over deputy commissioner of the New Jersey Athletic Commission, Bob Lee, in a 41 to 32 vote.

During his time as WBA President, Mendoza created KO Drugs, a substance abuse program aimed at helping young people find a better future via boxing. In March 2022, KO Drugs had its 37th edition festival in Panama City.

In December 2015, Gilberto Mendoza Sr. stepped down as President due to his health. In a unanimous decision, WBA delegates agreed that Mendoza Sr. would be succeeded by his son, Gilberto Mendoza Jr., then Vice-President of the WBA. Mendoza Jr. had already taken on many of the President's duties. In another unanimous vote, Mendoza Sr. was named WBA President Emeritus.

== Death ==
In March 2016, Mendoza died at the age of 72. Mendoza had been fighting cancer for nearly a decade, although he served as WBA President Emeritus until his death. His funeral was held in Caracas, Venezuela. He was laid to rest in his hometown of Barquisimeto.
