= Ryūsei Matsumoto =

Japanese boxer (born 1998)

Ryūsei Matsumoto 松本流星
Personal information
- Born: May 14, 1998 (age 28) Takasago, Hyōgo, Japan
- Height: 5 ft 3 in (160 cm)
- Weight: Mini-flyweight

Boxing career
- Reach: 61 1/2 in (156 cm)
- Stance: Southpaw

Boxing record
- Total fights: 9
- Wins: 9
- Win by KO: 4

Ryūsei Matsumoto (born May 14, 1998) is a Japanese professional boxer. He is a two-time mini-flyweight champion, having held the World Boxing Organization (WBO) mini-flyweight title since November 2026, and the World Boxing Association (WBA) (Regular version) mini-flyweight title from 2025 to 2026.

== Professional career ==
Matsumoto turned professional in 2023. He beat Filipino contender John Kevin Jimenez, via fourth round knockout in 2025. On 14 September that year, he defeated compatriot, Yuni Takada, by technical decision to win the vacant WBA (Regular) mini-flyweight title.

== Professional boxing record ==
9 fights	9 wins	0 losses
By knockout	4	0
By decision	5	0

No.	Result	Record	Opponent	Type	Round, time	Date	Location	Notes
9	Win	9–0	Russell Acosta Silveira	UD	12	2026-09-27	Toyota Arena Tokyo, Tokyo, Japan	Won vacant WBO interim mini-flyweight title
8	Win	8–0	Yuni Takada	UD	12	2026-03-15	Yokohama Buntai, Yokohama, Japan	Retained WBA (Regular) mini-flyweight title
7	Win	7–0	Yuni Takada	TD	5 (12), 1:26	2025-09-14	IG Arena, Nagoya, Japan	Won vacant WBA (Regular) mini-flyweight title; Unanimous TD: Takada was knocked out by an accidental clash of heads
6	Win	6–0	John Kevin Jimenez	KO	4 (10), 1:44	2025-06-07	Korakuen Hall, Tokyo, Japan	
5	Win	5–0	Masatora Okada	KO	4 (10), 1:22	2025-02-01	Korakuen Hall, Tokyo, Japan	Retained Japanese mini-flyweight title
4	Win	4–0	Katsuki Mori	TKO	7 (10), 0:59	2024-09-25	Korakuen Hall, Tokyo, Japan	Won vacant Japanese mini-flyweight title
3	Win	3–0	Jomar Caindog	UD	8	2024-02-03	Korakuen Hall, Tokyo, Japan	
2	Win	2–0	Darwin Boyones	UD	6	2023-09-02	Korakuen Hall, Tokyo, Japan	
1	Win	1–0	Erson Trinidad	KO	3 (6), 2:48	2023-02-04	Korakuen Hall, Tokyo, Japan	

== See also ==
- List of male boxers
- List of southpaw stance boxers
- Boxing in Japan
- List of Japanese boxing world champions
- List of world mini-flyweight boxing champions

Sporting positions
Regional boxing titles
Vacant Title last held by Yuni Takada	Japanese mini-flyweight champion September 25, 2024 – September 14, 2025; Won world title	Vacant
World boxing titles
Vacant Title last held by Erick Rosa	WBA mini-flyweight champion Regular title September 14, 2025 – June 1, 2026; Vacated	Vacant Title next held by Takeshi Ishii
Vacant Title last held by Tatsuya Fukuhara	WBO mini-flyweight champion Interim title September 27 – November 2, 2026; Promoted	Vacant
Vacant Title last held by Oscar Collazo	WBO mini-flyweight champion November 2, 2026 – present	Incumbent
