= Oscar Collazo (boxer) =

Puerto Rican boxer (born 1997)

Personal information
- Nicknames: El Pupilo ("The Ward")
- Born: Oscar Manuel Collazo; January 15, 1997 (age 29) Newark, New Jersey, U.S.
- Height: 5 ft 2 in (157 cm)
- Weight: Mini flyweight; Flyweight

Boxing career
- Reach: 61 in (155 cm)
- Stance: Southpaw

Boxing record
- Total fights: 15
- Wins: 15
- Win by KO: 12
Medal record
Men's Amateur boxing
Representing Puerto Rico
Pan American Games
Gold medal – first place	2019 Lima	Light Flyweight
Pan American Championship
Bronze medal – third place	2017 Tegucigalpa	Light Flyweight

Oscar Manuel Collazo (born January 15, 1997) is a Puerto Rican professional boxer. He has held the World Boxing Association WBA (Super version) and The Ring titles since November 2024, and previously the World Boxing Organization (WBO) mini-flyweight title from 2023 to 2026. He is the first mini flyweight to become The Ring champion in the division's history.

== Amateur career ==
During his seven-year amateur career, Collazo won five national amateur boxing titles, the bronze medal the 2017 Panamerican Championships and the gold medal at the 2019 Pan American Games.

== Professional career ==
=== Early career ===
Collazo made his professional debut as a light flyweight against Vicente Castro Cheneque on 15 February 2020. He won the fight by a third-round technical knockout. Collazo was next booked to face Kevin John Cruz Jusino on 5 December 2020. He won his second professional bout a round quicker than his first, as he won the fight by a second-round technical knockout.

Collazo moved up to flyweight for his next bout, against Francisco Bonilla on 25 March 2021, on the Amanda Serrano vs. Daniela Romina Bermúdez undercard. He won the fight by a career-first unanimous decision, with all three judges scoring the fight 60–54 in his favor. Collazo moved down to mini-flyweight to face Pedro Villegas for the vacant WBO Latino minimumweight title on 3 December 2021. He won the fight by a third-round technical knockout.

=== Rise up the ranks ===
Collazo faced the former WBO and WBA (Regular) mini-flyweight champion Vic Saludar in a WBA mini-flyweight title eliminator. The fight was booked for the undercard of the Javier Fortuna lightweight bout, which took place on July 16, 2022. Collazo won the fight by unanimous decision, with two scorecards of 116–112 and one scorecard of 118–110. Both fighters were knocked down in the sixth round, Saludar with a two-punch combination and Collazo with a right uppercut.

Collazo was expected to face the former WBO mini-flyweight titlist Wilfredo Méndez in a WBO mini-flyweight title eliminator on January 28, 2023, on the undercard of the Alexis Rocha and Anthony Young welterweight bout, which took place at the YouTube Theater in Inglewood, California. Méndez was forced to withdraw from the bout on January 15, due to a back injury sustained in training. He was replaced by Yudel Reyes, who stepped in at two-weeks notice. Collazo stopped his opponent with a left hook at the 2:59 minute mark of the fifth round. He had knocked Reyes down with a right hook in the previous round.

=== WBO mini-flyweight champion ===
==== Collazo vs. Jerusalem ====
On January 30, 2023, the WBO ordered their mini-flyweight champion Melvin Jerusalem make a mandatory title defense against Collazo. As they failed to reach a deal within the 30-day negotiation period, the sanctioning body scheduled a purse bid for February 23. It was declared deserted for failure to comply with purse bid terms, rescheduled for February 27, and eventually won by Golden Boy Promotions and Cotto Promotions with a bid of $152,000. The championship bout took place at the Fantasy Springs Casino in Indio, California on May 27, 2023. Collazo won the fight by stoppage in the seventh round, as Jerusalem remained on his stool at the start of the eighth round. He became the fastest fighter from Puerto Rico to win a world title belt, overtaking Alex Sánchez who captured his first title 11 fights into his professional career.

==== Collazo vs. Diagan ====
Collazo made a voluntary championship defense against the ninth-ranked WBO mini-flyweight contender Garen Diagan, who was making his first world title challenge, on August 26, 2023, at the Roberto Clemente Coliseum in San Juan, Puerto Rico. It was the first men's world title fight in Puerto Rico in six years and Collazo's first fight in his home country since 2021. The bout was broadcast worldwide by DAZN. Collazo won the fight by a seventh-round technical knockout, as Diagan's corner chose to withdraw their fighter from the contest in between the rounds. He was ahead on all three of the judges' scorecards at the time of the stoppage, with two scorecards of 60–54 and one scorecard of 58–56 in his favor.

==== Collazo vs. Gutierrez ====
On December 30, 2023, it was announced that Collazo would make his second WBO mini-flyweight championship defense against an unnamed opponent on the undercard of the Jaime Munguia and John Ryder super middleweight bout, which is expected to take place at the Footprint Center in Phoenix, Arizona on January 27, 2024. On January 17, 2024, it was confirmed that Collazo would face Reyneris Gutierrez.

On Saturday January 27, 2024, Collazo defeated Gutierrez via third-round TKO and made the second successful defense of his belt.

==== Collazo vs. Zapata ====
On April 5, 2024, Golden Boy Promotions announced that Collazo would make his next WBO mini-flyweight championship defense against the once-defeated Gerardo Zapata. The main event title bout took place at the Turning Stone Resort Casino in Verona, New York on June 7, 2025 and was broadcast worldwide by DAZN. Oscar Collazo retained his WBO strawweight title by overcoming an early scare to secure a lopsided unanimous decision victory over Gerardo Zapata. After being rattled and nearly knocked down by a heavy right hand in the second round, Collazo regained control by utilizing superior footwork and quick-fisted flurries. He ultimately dominated the later rounds to win comfortably on the scorecards, with two judges scoring the bout 119–109 and the third 117–110.

=== Unified WBO & WBA minimumweight championship ===
==== Collazo vs. Knockout CP Freshmart ====
On September 24, the highly anticipated unification fight was announced between Collazo and WBA champion Knockout CP Freshmart (25-0, 9 KOs), who at the time was recognised as boxing's longest-reigning active world champion, having made 12 successful defenses. Originally, Collazo was set to make a defence against Edwin “Canito” Hernandez. The fight was regarded as the best match to make in the weight class, with the winner also becoming the inaugural Ring champion. The fight was scheduled for November 16 in Riyadh, as part of the Riyadh Season card headlined by Gilberto Ramírez vs. Chris Billam-Smith. Collazo was the bookmakers favorite at 1/9 while Freshmart was priced at 9/1. Both weighed under the limit at 104.75 pounds.

Collazo dropped Freshmart three times, en route to a seventh-round TKO to unify the minimumweight titles and establish himself as the best in the weight class. Both started the fight cautiously. Collazo then stepped up the pace and landed counters and combinations, targeting the head and body. Freshmart focused on a body attack in an attempt to slow Collazo's movement. Collazo started to take more control from the fourth round. The first knockdown happened after Collazo landed a huge counter right hook in the sixth round. Freshmart recovered well and fired back with power punches, but Collazo remained in control. Collazo landed two more knockdowns in the seventh round, which included a left uppercut followed by a right hook to the body. This left Freshmart unable to continue with the referee stopping the fight at 1:29 of the round. After the fight, Collazo said he wanted to become the first undisputed Puerto Rican 105-pound champion. He also thanked Miguel Cotto for his guidance.

==== Collazo vs. Cano ====
Collazo then defended his unified titles against Edwin Cano in Cancun, Mexico on March 29, 2025. He won by KO in the fifth round. Following the win, he received the WBO ring, which is given to titleholders who make five successive defenses. Collazo stated this was one of his goals when he first won the WBO title.

On May 23, 2025, Collazo said he was open to having a rematch with Melvin Jerusalem, who had called Collazo out after winning his recent bout. Jerusalem had also picked up the WBC belt since his loss to Collazo in 2023.

==== Collazo vs. Vayson ====
On August 10, 2025, Golden Boy Promotions announced a double-header to take place on September 20 at Fantasy Springs Resort Casino in Indio, California on DAZN, with Collazo and undisputed women's flyweight champion Gabriela Fundora both defending their titles on the same card; Collazo would defend his titles against Filipino boxer Jayson Vayson (14–1–1, 8 KOs), while Fundora's defense against Alexas Kubicki would serve as the co-main event. Vayson was on a four-fight win, with three of them inside the distance. Speaking ahead of the fight, Collazo said, “We will enter the ring very prepared, with a lot of boxing IQ. We know Vayson is a great fighter and that he will be hungry to dethrone me, but he won’t be able to, because I have worked hard to defend what is mine and represent my island with pride.”

Despite the fight being more challenging than anticipated, Collazo successfully defended his titles with a seventh-round stoppage, with some controversy. Collazo scored a controversial first-round knockdown, which replays indicated was due to a forearm rather than a clean punch. Vayson’s body shots caused Collazo trouble, particularly in the fourth round. In the sixth round, Collazo increased his pressure, landed combinations, pushing Vayson against the ropes. He continued this into the next round. Despite Vayson appearing able to continue, his corner unexpectedly threw in the towel at 1:41 of the seventh round, resulting in a technical knockout for Collazo. Despite being pressed against the ropes and absorbing significant shots, Vayson showed resilience and effective counterpunching throughout the fight. At the time of stoppage, all three judges had it 59–54 for Collazo. The stoppage was widely debated. Many observers noted that Vayson seemed able to continue and was still competitive, leading to criticism of his corner for ending the fight prematurely. Vayson felt that he was capable of carrying on but respected his corner’s decision.

After the fight, he spoke to Chris Mannix, stating his main goal was to add more titles at the weight—however, he would not rule out a move up to flyweight against WBA and WBC champion Ricardo Sandoval. His focus was to become the first male Puerto Rican undisputed champion.

Following the retirement of Terence Crawford, Collazo entered The Ring magazine's top 10 pound-for-pound list at number 10 on 24 December 2025, his highest ranking yet.

==== Collazo vs. Haro ====
After plans for a rematch with Jerusalem fell through, Collazo instead faced Mexican-American Jesus Haro (13–3, 2 KOs) on Anaheim, CA, as the co-feature to the Arnold Barboza Jr. vs. Kenneth match on March 14, 2026. The bout was intended as a stay-busy fight for Collazo, who intended to finalize the Jerusalem rematch for the summer should he defeat Haro. Despite Haro initially being evasive, the fight proved to be a mismatch, as Collazo eventually wore down his opponent with body shots en route to a sixth-round corner retirement, producing the first stoppage loss in Haro's career. Interviewed after the bout, Collazo stated his intention of reaching The Ring's top five pound-for-pound rankings. With this win, the rematch with Jerusalem was expected to move forward should Jerusalem successfully defend against Siyakholwa Kuse on May 16.

=== Flyweight ===
==== Collazo vs. Valdez ====
Collazo's next fight was announced on May 29, 2026 by Golden Boy Promotions, to take place at the Frontwave Arena in Oceanside, California. He was scheduled to defend his title against Joey Canoy (25–5–2, 15 KOs) on June 20 on DAZN. Canoy was entering the fight on a long unbeaten streak dating back to 2021. He was challenging for a major world title for the first time in his career. During fight week, it was reported that Canoy withdrew from the bout after failing to secure the necessary work visa to enter the United States. Promoters submitted a request for Mexican contender Luis Castillo (22–1–1, 14 KOs) to serve as a late replacement. The WBO announced that it would hold a special meeting to determine whether Joey Canoy would be replaced. Their Ratings and Championship Committee was tasked with reviewing the request and ruling on Castillo’s eligibility. The request was put forward by co‑promoter Miguel Cotto. Replacing Canoy with Castillo also proved unsuccessful due to similar visa issues. Mexican contender Neider Valdez (15–3–3. 12 KOs) was secured as a late replacement on short notice. Valdez, who entered the bout with mixed recent form, was widely regarded as a less proven opponent. There was uncertainty about whether the WBA and WBO would sanction the fight. Collazo was listed as an 80-1 favorite by DraftKings. The WBA refused to sanction the bout, however, the WBO approved sanctioning it. The title defense was altered to a non-title bout. Valdez was unable to make the 105-pound limit. As a result, the contest was moved up to the flyweight division, with both fighters weighing above the minimumweight threshold. Collazo weighed 110.6 pounds and Valdez weighed 111.2 pounds. Collazo sent Valdez to the canvas three times before the referee stepped in and halted the fight in the second round. Following the fight, Collazo stated his intention to move up in weight and pursue a bout with unified flyweight champion Ricardo Sandoval, describing himself as ready to “make history,” while promoter Oscar De La Hoya also endorsed the potential matchup as a leading fight in the division.

==== Cancelled Ricardo Sandoval fight ====
On August 27, 2026, Collazo announced plans to move directly to flyweight for a bout against WBA and WBC champion Ricardo Sandoval (27–2, 18 KOs). He described the fight as an opportunity to make history and test himself against elite opposition. He chose to bypass the light-flyweight division, because of his friendship with fellow Puerto Rican champion René Santiago. The bout was scheduled for October 10 at Wintrust Arena in Chicago on the undercard of Floyd Schofield vs. Lucas Bahdi. On September 18, Collazo suffered a rib injury whilst training which forced him to withdraw from the fight. Collazo was replaced by Sergio Mendoza (27–1, 23 KOs), who went on to upset Sandoval via TKO, to win the world titles.

==== Vacating Minimumweight titles ====
On October 19, 2026, the WBO ordered Collazo to make a mandatory defence against interim champion Ryūsei Matsumoto (9–0. 4 KOs). Matsumoto win the interim belt after defeating Mexican Russell Silviera on September 27 in Tokyo. At this stage, it was unknown whether Collazo would defend his unified titles again. Teiken Promotions, on behalf of Matsumoto requested immediate purse bids, bypassing the negotiation period. A purse bid was set for November 2. On the day of the purse bids, Collazo vacated his WBO title, which elevated Matsumoto to full championship status. It was reported that Teiken Promotions had a bid of $501,000 ready, had it taken place.

== Professional boxing record ==
15 fights	15 wins	0 losses
By knockout	12	0
By decision	3	0

No.	Result	Record	Opponent	Type	Round, time	Date	Location	Notes
15	Win	15–0	Neider Valdez	KO	2 (12), 2:35	Jun 20, 2026	Frontwave Arena, Oceanside, California, U.S.	Won vacant WBO International flyweight title
14	Win	14–0	Jesus Haro	RTD	6 (12), 3:00	Mar 14, 2026	Honda Center, Anaheim, California, U.S.	Retained WBA (Super), WBO, and The Ring mini-flyweight titles
13	Win	13–0	Jayson Vayson	KO	7 (12), 1:41	Sep 20, 2025	Fantasy Springs Casino, Indio, California, U.S.	Retained WBA (Super), WBO, and The Ring mini-flyweight titles
12	Win	12–0	Edwin Cano	KO	5 (12), 1:12	Mar 29, 2025	Polifórum Benito Juárez, Cancún, Mexico	Retained WBA (Super), WBO, and The Ring mini-flyweight titles
11	Win	11–0	Knockout CP Freshmart	TKO	7 (12), 1:29	Nov 16, 2024	The Venue Riyadh Season, Riyadh, Saudi Arabia	Retained WBO mini-flyweight title; Won WBA (Super) and inaugural The Ring mini-flyweight titles
10	Win	10–0	Gerardo Zapata	UD	12	Jun 7, 2024	Turning Stone Resort Casino, Verona, New York, U.S.	Retained WBO mini-flyweight title
9	Win	9–0	Reyneris Gutierrez	TKO	3 (12), 2:37	Jan 28, 2024	Footprint Center, Phoenix, Arizona, U.S.	Retained WBO mini-flyweight title
8	Win	8–0	Garen Diagan	RTD	6 (12), 3:00	Aug 26, 2023	Roberto Clemente Coliseum, San Juan, Puerto Rico	Retained WBO mini-flyweight title
7	Win	7–0	Melvin Jerusalem	RTD	7 (12), 3:00	May 27, 2023	Fantasy Springs Resort Casino, Indio, California, U.S.	Won WBO mini-flyweight title
6	Win	6–0	Yudel Reyes	KO	5 (12), 2:59	Jan 28, 2023	YouTube Theater, Inglewood, California, U.S.	
5	Win	5–0	Vic Saludar	UD	12	Jul 16, 2022	Crypto.com Arena, Los Angeles, California, U.S.	
4	Win	4–0	Pedro Villegas	TKO	3 (10), 2:47	Dec 3, 2021	Los Andes Mall, Panama City, Panama	Won vacant WBO Latino mini-flyweight title
3	Win	3–0	Francisco Bonilla	UD	6	Mar 25, 2021	Plaza del Quinto Centenario, San Juan, Puerto Rico	
2	Win	2–0	Kevin John Cruz Jusino	TKO	2 (6), 1:43	Dec 5, 2020	Coliseo Pedrin Zorrilla, San Juan, Puerto Rico	
1	Win	1–0	Vicente Castro Cheneque	TKO	3 (6), 1:53	Feb 15, 2020	Coliseo Pedrin Zorrilla, San Juan, Puerto Rico	

== See also ==
- List of male boxers
- List of southpaw stance boxers
- Boxing in Puerto Rico
- List of Puerto Rican boxing world champions
- List of world mini-flyweight boxing champions

Sporting positions
Regional boxing titles
Vacant Title last held by Carlos Licona	WBO Latino mini-flyweight champion December 3, 2021 – 2022; Vacated	Vacant Title next held by Wilfredo Méndez
Vacant Title last held by Olimjon Nazarov	WBO International flyweight champion June 20, 2026 – present	Incumbent
World boxing titles
Preceded by Melvin Jerusalem	WBO mini-flyweight champion May 27, 2023 – November 2, 2026; Vacated	Succeeded by Ryūsei Matsumoto; Interim champion promoted
Preceded by Knockout CP Freshmart	WBA mini-flyweight champion Super title November 16, 2024 – present	Incumbent
Inaugural champion	The Ring mini-flyweight champion November 16, 2024 – present	Incumbent
