= René Santiago =

Puerto Rican boxer (born 1992)

Personal information
- Born: René Manuel Santiago García; April 10, 1992 (age 34) Humacao, Puerto Rico
- Height: 5 ft 3 in (160 cm)
- Weight: Mini flyweight; Light flyweight

Boxing career
- Reach: 62 1/2 in (159 cm)
- Stance: Orthodox

Boxing record
- Total fights: 20
- Wins: 16
- Win by KO: 9
- Losses: 4

René Manuel Santiago García (born April 10, 1992) is a Puerto Rican professional boxer. He is a light-flyweight champion having held the unified World Boxing Association (WBA) (Unified version) and the World Boxing Organization (WBO) light-flyweight titles in 2026.

== Professional career ==
Santiago turned professional in 2014 and compiled a record 12–3 before defeating Nicaraguan Kevin Vivas, to win the vacant WBO interim light-flyweight title.

Santiago challenged Jonathan Gonzalez for WBO light-flyweight title in San Juan, Puerto Rico, on 2 March 2024. He lost the fight by unanimous decision.

Santiago claimed the WBO light-flyweight title with a unanimous decision win over defending champion Shokichi Iwata at Ryōgoku Kokugikan in Tokyo, Japan, on 13 March 2025.

Santiago's first defense was in an unification bout with the World Boxing Association’s (WBA) champion, Kyosuke Takami of Japan. Despite entering the fight as a 9–1 underdog, Santiago defeated Takami by split decision. The cards were 116–112, 113–115 and 111–117.

On April 3, 2026, Santiago traveled to Tokyo for his second defense, defeating former world champion Masataka Taniguchi by unanimous decision after scoring a knockdown in the fifth round as part of the main event of a card held at the historic Korakuen Hall.

== Professional boxing record ==
20 fights	16 wins	4 losses
By knockout	9	0
By decision	6	4
By disqualification	1	0

No.	Result	Record	Opponent	Type	Round, time	Date	Location	Notes
20	Win	16–4	Masataka Taniguchi	UD	12	3 Apr 2026	Korakuen Hall, Tokyo, Japan	Retained WBA and WBO light-flyweight titles
19	Win	15–4	Kyosuke Takami	SD	12	17 Dec 2025	Kokugikan, Tokyo, Japan	Retained WBO light-flyweight title; Won WBA light-flyweight title
18	Win	14–4	Shokichi Iwata	UD	12	13 Mar 2025	Ryōgoku Kokugikan, Tokyo, Japan	Won WBO light-flyweight title
17	Win	13–4	Ricardo Astuvilca	UD	12	30 Oct 2024	Coliseo Alcalde Marcelo Trujillo Panisse, Humacao, Puerto Rico	Won vacant WBO International light-flyweight title
16	Loss	12–4	Jonathan González	UD	12	2 Mar 2024	José Miguel Agrelot Coliseum, San Juan, Puerto Rico	For WBO light-flyweight title
15	Win	12–3	Kevin Vivas	KO	12 (12), 1:18	27 Oct 2023	Polideportivo Alexis Arguello, Managua, Nicaragua	Won WBO interim light-flyweight title
14	Win	11–3	Carlos Ortega	TKO	9 (10), 1:28	14 Apr 2023	Coliseo de Combates, Pandeportes, Panama City, Panama	
13	Win	10–3	Gerardo Zapata	DQ	2 (10), 1:30	16 Dec 2022	Pabellon de Esgrima, Centro Olimpico, Santo Domingo, Dominican Republic	Won vacant WBO Latino light-flyweight title
12	Loss	9–3	Yudel Reyes	UD	10	8 Apr 2022	Pabellon de Esgrima, Centro Olimpico, Santo Domingo, Dominican Republic	For vacant NABO mini-flyweight title
11	Win	9–2	Jose Calderon	TKO	2 (10), 1:07	7 Nov 2021	Multiuso Villa Riva, San Francisco de Macoris, Dominican Republic	
10	Win	8–2	Israel Vazquez	UD	10	31 Jan 2020	Cancha Ruben Zayas Montanez, Trujillo Alto, Puerto Rico	Won vacant WBO Latino light-flyweight title
9	Win	7–2	Juan Gabriel Guzman Pichardo	TKO	1 (10), 2:58	23 Nov 2019	Discoteca Juanita, San Ignacio de Sabaneta, Dominican Republic	
8	Loss	6–2	Geovani Garcia Barragan	UD	6	7 Dec 2018	Auditorio BB, Mexico City, Mexico	
7	Win	6–1	Jesus Miguel Martinez Castillo	TKO	2 (6), 2:27	25 Aug 2018	Hotel Marien, San Ignacio de Sabaneta, Dominican Republic	
6	Win	5–1	Starlin Reyes Sierra	KO	1 (4), 2:55	1 Jul 2018	Club Plaza Valerio, Santiago de los Caballeros, Dominican Republic	
5	Loss	4–1	Waldemar Pagan	UD	6	30 Jan 2016	Cancha Juanito Cabello, Cidra, Puerto Rico	
4	Win	4–0	Alberto Medina Maldonado	TKO	2 (4), 2:27	22 Aug 2015	Coliseo Tomas Dones, Fajardo, Puerto Rico	
3	Win	3–0	Alexis Diaz	TKO	3 (4), 2:59	31 May 2015	Coliseo Nelson Dieppa, Vieques, Puerto Rico	
2	Win	2–0	Luis Diaz	TKO	2 (4), 1:45	25 Apr 2015	Mario Morales Coliseum, Guaynabo, Puerto Rico	
1	Win	1–0	Gustavo Ortiz	UD	4	22 Nov 2014	Emilio E. Huyke Coliseum, Humacao, Puerto Rico	

== See also ==
- List of male boxers
- List of Puerto Ricans
- Boxing in Puerto Rico
- List of Puerto Rican boxing world champions
- List of world light-flyweight boxing champions

Sporting positions
Regional boxing titles
Vacant Title last held by Agustin Mauro Gauto	WBO latino light-flyweight champion January 31, 2020 – 2020; Vacated	Vacant Title next held by Angelino Cordova
Vacant Title last held by Angelino Cordova	WBO latino light-flyweight champion December 16, 2022 – 2023; Vacated	Vacant Title next held by Gerardo Sánchez
Vacant Title last held by Ángel Acosta	WBO International light-flyweight champion October 30, 2024 – March 13, 2025; Won world title	Vacant
World boxing titles
Vacant Title last held by Moisés Fuentes	WBO light-flyweight champion Interim title October 27, 2023 – March 2, 2024; Lost bid for full title	Vacant
Preceded by Shokichi Iwata	WBO light-flyweight champion March 13, 2025 – present	Incumbent
Preceded by Kyosuke Takami	WBA light-flyweight champion December 17, 2025 – July 28, 2026; Status changed	Vacant Title next held by Daiya Kira
Vacant Title last held by Kenshiro Teraji	WBA light-flyweight champion Unified title September 30, 2026 – present	Incumbent
Honorary boxing titles
Vacant Title last held by Brahim Asloum	WBA light-flyweight champion Champion in recess July 28 – September 30, 2026; Reinstated	Vacant
