= World Boxing Association =

Sanctioning organization for professional boxing bouts

- Abbreviation: WBA
- Formation: 1921; 105 years ago (as NBA) 23 August 1962; 64 years ago (as WBA)
- Type: Non-profit institution
- Headquarters: Panama City, Panama
- Region served: Worldwide
- President: Gilberto Mendoza Jr.
- Main organ: General Assembly
- Website: wbaboxing.com

The World Boxing Association (WBA), formerly known as the National Boxing Association (NBA), is an international professional boxing organization based in Panama. The WBA awards its world championship title at the professional level.

Founded in the United States in 1921 by 13 state representatives as the NBA, it is the oldest regulating fights. In 1962, it changed its name in recognition of boxing's growing popularity around the world and began to admit other nations as members. By 1975, a majority of its members were Latin American nations and the organization headquarters was moved to Panama City, Panama. It moved again in the 1990s to Venezuela before returning to Panama in 2007.

Alongside the World Boxing Council (WBC), International Boxing Federation (IBF) and World Boxing Organization (WBO), it is one of four major organizations which sanctions professional boxing bouts. As of August 2024, boxing website BoxRec no longer recognizes WBA world title fights or world champions.

== History ==
The WBA can be traced back to the original National Boxing Association, organized in 1921. The first bout it recognized was the Jack Dempsey–Georges Carpentier heavyweight championship bout in New Jersey.

The NBA was formed by representatives from 13 American states, including Sam Milner, to counterbalance the influence that the New York State Athletic Commission (NYSAC) wielded. The NBA and the NYSAC sometimes crowned different "world champions" in the same division, leading to confusion about who was the real champion.

The International Boxing Research Organization describes the early NBA as follows:

Originally more comparable to the present American Association of Boxing Commissions than to its offspring and successor, the NBA sanctioned title bouts, published lists of outstanding challengers, withdrew titular recognition, but did not attempt to appoint its own title bout officials or otherwise impose its will on championship fights. It also did not conduct purse bids or collect "sanctioning fees."

The NBA officially became the WBA on 23 August 1962. Gilberto Mendoza was the President of the WBA from 1982 until his death in 2016, after which Gilberto Mendoza Jr. took over as president. In the 1990s, the WBA moved its central offices from Panama City, Panama, to Caracas, Venezuela. In January 2007, it returned its offices to Panama.

== Controversies ==
As has been the case with all major boxing sanctioning organizations, the WBA has been plagued with charges of corrupt practices. In a 1981 Sports Illustrated article, a boxing judge claimed he was influenced by WBA President Gilberto Mendoza to judge certain fighters competing for their titles more favorably. The same article also discussed a variety of bribes paid to WBA officials to obtain championship bout opportunities, or higher placement within the organization's rankings. In a 1982 interview, boxing promoter Bob Arum claimed that he had to pay off WBA officials to obtain rankings for his fighters. Further support for allegations of this nature came in the 1980s and 1990s as two other organizations would have similar corruption exposed, including the conviction and imprisonment of IBF President Bob Lee and Graciano Rocchigiani's successful civil prosecution of the WBC that resulted in the organization briefly filing for bankruptcy before reaching a settlement that saved it from collapse.

=== Fragmented championships ===
Until the autumn of 2021, the WBA recognized up to four world champions in any given weight division, to the point of rendering it technically impossible under certain conditions for a WBA world champion to even hold sole recognition from the organization as its champion in a division.

The most prominent designation is that of the WBA Super champion, which was created in 2000 following a suggestion by Lennox Lewis after he was forced to relinquish his WBA heavyweight title prior to his defense against Michael Grant. This distinction was initially reserved for WBA champions who are simultaneously recognized by the WBC, IBF or WBO. A WBA Super champion is afforded special consideration by the organization with respect to meeting mandatory defense obligations to maintain championship recognition, but it also has opened the door for the organization to recognize a separate world champion, commonly referred to as the Regular champion; creating confusion among fans as to who holds the de facto championship title. Some world champions have been upgraded to WBA Super champion status without winning another organization's title, among them Floyd Mayweather Jr., Chris John, Anselmo Moreno and Manny Pacquiao; or upon defending their WBA title five or more times. Upon awarding a WBA Super championship, the regular world champion status is deemed vacant, whereupon it is filled by the organization as a separate championship. On March 5, 2021, Claressa Shields became the inaugural WBA Super women's champion at light middleweight.

The WBA further complicated this from time to time by recognizing an interim champion, ostensibly in cases where a designated world champion is, for some reason, prohibited from making a timely defense of their title. Under such conditions, the interim title holder is to be the next person to compete for one of the full championship titles once the champion is in a position to compete. In practice, however, this actually occurred rarely if ever and in 2019 the organization began awarding the WBA Gold title, for which no provision exists even within the organization's own governing documents. In December 2019 for example, they simultaneously recognized a WBA Super champion (Anthony Joshua), WBA champion (Manuel Charr), WBA interim champion (Trevor Bryan) and WBA Gold champion (Robert Helenius) in the heavyweight division.

There have even been instances where different WBA World Champions have defended versions of the same title, in the same weight class, on the same date, and even within the same event. On September 14, 2024, for example, Caleb Plant defeated Trevor McCumby to earn recognition as the WBA's Interim World Super Middleweight championship in an event that was headlined by Canelo Alvarez, who defended his WBA Super World Super Middleweight championship against Edgar Berlanga.

Following the controversial decision in the Gabriel Maestre vs. Mykal Fox fight on August 7, 2021, amid immense public pressure, the WBA finally began eliminating all interim titles in the attempt to return to a single champion per weight division. They reverted to issuing interim championships in 2024.

== Title reduction plan ==
In August 2021, a letter sent by the Association of Boxing Commissions (ABC) stated that the WBA having multiple titles was "misleading to the public and the boxers". The ABC also stated that if the WBA fails to do a satisfactory action regarding the issue, they would recommend to its members:

- Not to honor the WBA belt as sanctioned within the U.S.
- Not to accept WBA official recommendations.
- Not to allow a WBA supervisor in the controlled area around the ring.

This could result in the WBA being blocked in the U.S. and will heavily impact WBA's business.

The WBA in turn responded by declaring all of their Interim titles vacant. They then ordered tournaments to determine a single champion of their weight classes.

At minimumweight, Regular champion Vic Saludar was ordered to face former Interim champion Erick Rosa on 26 August 2021, with Rosa winning the Regular title via split decision on 21 December. it was not until 29 September 2022, until the WBA officially ordered Rosa against Super champion Knockout CP Freshmart, however, after multiple failed attempts to make the fight, Rosa officially vacated his Regular title on 15 January 2024 to move up to light flyweight, leaving CP Freshmart as sole champion.

At light flyweight, Super champion Hiroto Kyoguchi and Regular champion Esteban Bermudez had already been ordered to fight prior to the ABC letter on 10 June 2021, but complications meant it was not until 28 January 2022 when purse bids were due to be held, however injury to Kyoguchi meant the WBA instead approved the rematch between Bermudez and former regular champion Carlos Cañizales 2 days earlier on 26 January. Bermudez vs Cañizales did not end up happening due to the latter's short-lived decision to move up to flyweight, and thus Kyoguchi-Bermudez took place on 10 June, with Kyoguchi winning by TKO. Former Interim champion Daniel Matellon was ordered to face Cañizales on September 30 in a final eliminator for the Super title, with Cañizales winning via technical decision on 9 June 2023, becoming mandatory to Kenshiro Teraji, who defeated Kyoguchi by TKO on 1 November 2022. Teraji defeated Cañizales via majority decision on 23 January 2024 to become sole champion.

At flyweight, the removal of Interim champions meant Artem Dalakian was left as sole champion of the division. Despite never being upgraded to Super champion, Dalakian had been the WBA's primary champion since winning the title in 2018, due to the absence of a Super champion since 2015. Dalakian was ordered to face former Interim champion Luis Concepción on 19 August 2021, whom he defeated by TKO on 20 November to remain sole champion.

At super flyweight, Super champion Juan Francisco Estrada was ordered to face Regular champion Joshua Franco on 9 February, with the fight going to purse bid on 19 April. Despite it being announced on 17 May that the fight would take place on 16 July, Estrada was disowned and stripped by the Championships Committee on 11 August for pursuing a rematch with Román González, leaving Franco as the sole champion of the division.

At bantamweight, Regular champion Guillermo Rigondeaux was stripped of his title on 14 August 2021, after facing then WBO champion John Riel Casimero. The WBA announced its refusal to sanction the fight on 23 July, in respect of restrictions placed on Regular titles by the WBO, and declared Rigondeaux would have to request to be ranked in order to follow through with the fight, in which his Regular title would be declared vacant. Super champion Naoya Inoue then became sole champion.

At super bantamweight, Brandon Figueroa was stripped of his Regular title on 2 December 2021, after facing Stephen Fulton in a WBC and WBO unification on November 27. This was due to restrictions imposed by the WBO who refuse to sanction fights involving the Regular title, with the WBA respecting this and announcing on 17 August (before the ABC letter) that Figueroa would be stripped. This came after Figueroa was allowed to "unify" in his previous fight with then WBC champion Luis Nery on 15 May, as the WBC do not impose the same restrictions on the Regular title. This left Super champion Murodjohn Akhmadaliev as sole champion. Former Interim champion Ra'eese Aleem did not move forward any with WBA sanctioned fight and was subsequently dropped from the initial mandatory position.

At featherweight, Regular champion Leigh Wood was ordered to face former Interim champion Michael Conlan on 27 August 2021, with Wood winning by KO on 12 March 2022. On 6 April, the WBA ordered the bout between Wood and Super champion Léo Santa Cruz. On 19 July, the WBA rejected a request from Santa Cruz to unify with WBC champion Rey Vargas, insisting he had to fight Wood, which Santa Cruz accepted 2 days later on 21 July. On 12 August, it was announced that Santa Cruz and Wood had reached an agreement, and thus purse bids were canceled. On 24 August, the WBA announced they had approved the previously rejected unification between Santa Cruz and Vargas, as well as a title defense for Wood against Mauricio Lara, with the winners set to fight each other. Wood, who was due to fight Lara on 24 September, pulled out with an injury on 19 September, and on 30 September the WBA ruled Wood must face Santa Cruz in his comeback fight, and refused to grant any additional exceptions. Purse bids were scheduled for 12 December, however did not take place due to Santa Cruz relinquishing his Super title and leaving Wood as the sole champion of the division.

At super featherweight, Gervonta Davis vacated his Super title on 28 August 2021, leaving then Regular champion Roger Gutiérrez as the sole champion. Gutiérrez had been ordered to face former Interim champion Chris Colbert on 15 August, but following Gutierrez's withdrawal, replacement Héctor Garcia defeated Colbert via unanimous decision to become mandatory challenger on 26 February 2022. The WBA thus ordered Gutiérrez vs Garcia on 27 June, with Garcia winning a unanimous decision victory to become champion on 20 August 2022.

At lightweight, Regular champion Gervonta Davis was due to face former Interim champion Rolando Romero on 5 December 2021, but following withdrawal from Romero instead faced Isaac Cruz, winning by unanimous decision. The WBA then formally ordered Davis Vs Romero on 24 January 2022, with Davis winning via TKO on 28 May to retain the Regular title. On 30 November 2023, Super champion Devin Haney relinquished his title ahead of his clash against WBC super-lightweight champion Regis Prograis, thus leaving Davis as sole champion.

At super lightweight, Gervonta Davis vacated his Regular title on 8 December 2021, leaving then Super champion Josh Taylor as sole champion. Taylor was then ordered to face former Interim champion Alberto Puello on 9 March 2022, but was stripped on 14 May for failing to sign the contract. Puello was then ordered to face Batyr Akhmedov on 12 June following a panel to determine the next challenger, with Puello winning via split decision on 20 August to become champion. The Interim title was contested by Ohara Davies and Ismael Barroso on 6 January 2024, following an injury sustained to champion Rolando Romero. While it was expected that Romero would face the winner as soon as he was able, he instead defended his title against Isaac Cruz on 30 March, losing via TKO.

At welterweight, the WBA ordered a 4-man box off on 16 September 2021, consisting of Super champion Yordenis Ugas against Eimantas Stanionis and Regular champion Jamal James against Radzhab Butaev, with the winners set to face each other to determine one champion. On 20 October, the WBA initially rejected permission from Ugas to unify with WBC and IBF champion Errol Spence Jr., while Butaev defeated James via TKO on 30 October to become Regular champion. On 8 February 2022 it was announced that Ugas and Spence Jr. would indeed unify on 16 April, followed by the announcement of Butaev vs Stanionis on the undercard on 21 February. Stanionis would go on to defeat Butaev via split decision to become Regular champion, while Spence Jr. defeated Ugas via TKO to become Super champion. Following this on 21 November, the WBA granted special permission for Spence Jr. to defend his titles against former unified champion Keith Thurman, while Stanionis was instead ordered to face Vergil Ortiz Jr., with the winners set to meet. However, an undisputed title fight between Spence and WBO champion Terence Crawford was announced on 25 May 2023, taking place on 29 July, with Crawford winning via TKO. Stanionis Vs Ortiz Jr. was scheduled to take place on 8 July following a delay from 29 April, but was again called off following medical issues with Ortiz Jr. Stanionis instead faced former Interim champion Gabriel Maestre, who was not included in the WBA's initial box off despite being the final Interim champion before the ABC Letter. Stanionis defeated Maestre via UD on 4 May 2024. On 31 August, Terence Crawford vacated his welterweight WBA Super title after winning the WBA super welterweight title on 3 August, leaving Stanionis as the sole champion.

At super welterweight, Regular champion Erislandy Lara was forced to vacate on 31 August 2021, leaving Super champion Jermell Charlo as sole champion.

At middleweight, Super champion Gennady Golovkin was ordered to face Regular champion Erislandy Lara on 23 September 2022. On 9 March 2023, it was announced that Golovkin had vacated the Super title, leaving Lara as sole champion. Former Interim champion Chris Eubank Jr. did not move forward with any WBA sanctioned fight and was thus dropped from the initial mandatory position.

At super middleweight, Regular champion David Morrell opted to vacate his title on 31 August 2024 after winning the vacant Regular title at light heavyweight on 3 August, after the WBA stated he could only hold one belt. This left Super champion Canelo Alvarez as sole champion.

At light heavyweight, the removal of Interim champions meant Super champion Dmitry Bivol became sole champion. Former Interim champion Robin Krasniqi lost in a rematch to Dominic Boesel on 10 October 2021, with Boesel becoming #1 challenger for Bivol. Boesel fought #2 ranked Gilberto Ramirez in a final eliminator to determine the mandatory challenger on 14 May 2022, with Ramirez winning by knockout. Bivol Vs Ramirez was then ordered on 11 July, with Bivol winning via unanimous decision on 5 November.

At cruiserweight, Super champion Arsen Goulamirian and Regular champion Ryad Merhy had been ordered to fight on 19 July 2022 (a rematch of their 2018 Interim title fight). Merhy instead pursued a fight with WBC champion Ilunga Makabu, however, after concerns with making the cruiserweight limit, Makabu vs Merhy was called off on 8 August, and Merhy sent a formal letter to the WBA vacating his title 4 days later on 12 August, leaving Goulamirian as the sole champion.

At heavyweight, Regular champion Trevor Bryan was ordered to face former Interim champion Daniel Dubois on 31 January 2022, with Dubois winning via KO on 11 June. Following this, Dubois was ordered to face Super champion Oleksandr Usyk on 12 December, with the fight taking place on 26 August 2023, where Usyk won via KO to become sole champion.

In January 2024, the WBA once again began to sanction fights for the Interim and Regular titles in weight divisions which already had a sole WBA champion. In August 2024, David Morrell won the vacant Regular title at light heavyweight, before vacating his Regular super middleweight title. In April 2025, Jaron Ennis became the first fighter to be upgraded to Super champion since the ABC letter after he defeated Eimantas Stanionis, as the WBA sanctioned the Regular title for a fight between Ryan Garcia and Rolando Romero. In September 2025, WBA sanctioned a fight for the vacant Regular minimumweight title which was won by Ryūsei Matsumoto.

== Man of Triumph belts ==
Since 2015, the WBA awards a customized version of their WBA Super champion belt to big fights involving a WBA championship. The WBA called this the Man of Triumph belt, named after the trophy awarded to the winner of the Mayweather vs. Pacquiao fight. The plate of the belt has the images of the two boxers fighting. Floyd Mayweather Jr. received the first gold-plated version of the belt while Manny Pacquiao was awarded a one-time rhodium-plated version. Other recipients of the custom gold-plated belt are Anthony Joshua, Vasyl Lomachenko, Manny Pacquiao, Oleksandr Usyk, Canelo Álvarez and Callum Smith.

== Cooperation with IBA ==
The WBA signed a cooperation agreement with the Russian-led amateur governing body International Boxing Association in 2022. The WBA also reinstated Russian and Belarusian boxers to its rankings after they were initially removed after the Russian invasion of Ukraine.

== Current WBA world title holders ==
As of 16 October 2026

=== Male ===
Weight class	Champion	Reign began	Days
Minimumweight (105 lbs)	Oscar Collazo (Super champion)	16 November 2024	699
Minimumweight (105 lbs)	Takeshi Ishii	2 September 2026	44
Light flyweight (108 lbs)	René Santiago (Unified champion)	30 September 2026	16
Light flyweight (108 lbs)	Daiya Kira	2 September 2026	44
Flyweight (112 lbs)	Sergio Mendoza	10 October 2026	6
Super flyweight (115 lbs)	David Jiménez	13 June 2026	125
Bantamweight (118 lbs)	Jesse Rodriguez (Super champion)	10 July 2026	98
Bantamweight (118 lbs)	Riku Masuda	20 July 2026	88
Super bantamweight (122 lbs)	Naoya Inoue (Super champion)	26 December 2023	1025
Super bantamweight (122 lbs)	Gary Antonio Russell (Interim)	22 August 2026	55
Featherweight (126 lbs)	Vacant		
Super featherweight (130 lbs)	Anthony Cacace (Super champion)	8 September 2026	38
Super featherweight (130 lbs)	Elnur Samedov	8 September 2026	38
Lightweight (135 lbs)	Gervonta Davis (Champion in recess)	17 January 2026	272
Super lightweight (140 lbs)	Gary Antuanne Russell	1 March 2025	594
Welterweight (147 lbs)	Teofimo Lopez (Super champion)	22 August 2026	55
Welterweight (147 lbs)	Jack Catterall	23 May 2026	146
Super welterweight (154 lbs)	Jaron Ennis	27 June 2026	111
Middleweight (160 lbs)	Erislandy Lara	1 May 2021	1994
Super middleweight (168 lbs)	Jaime Munguia	2 May 2026	167
Light heavyweight (175 lbs)	Dmitry Bivol (Super champion)	22 February 2025	601
Light heavyweight (175 lbs)	Albert Ramírez (Interim)	8 August 2025	434
Cruiserweight (200 lbs)	David Benavidez (Super champion)	2 May 2026	167
Cruiserweight (200 lbs)	Jai Opetaia	12 September 2026	34
Heavyweight (200+ lbs)	Murat Gassiev	26 June 2026	112

=== Female ===
Weight class	Champion	Reign began	Days
Light minimumweight (102 lbs)	Vacant		
Minimumweight (105 lbs)	Sarah Bormann	18 October 2025	363
Light flyweight (108 lbs)	Estefany Alegria	13 June 2026	125
Flyweight (112 lbs)	Gabriela Fundora	2 November 2024	713
Super flyweight (115 lbs)	Nataly Delgado	13 June 2026	125
Bantamweight (118 lbs)	Cherneka Johnson	12 May 2024	887
Super bantamweight (122 lbs)	Vacant		
Featherweight (126 lbs)	Amanda Serrano	4 February 2023	1350
Super featherweight (130 lbs)	Alycia Baumgardner	4 February 2023	1350
Lightweight (135 lbs)	Stephanie Han	22 February 2025	601
Super lightweight (140 lbs)	Katie Taylor	25 November 2023	1056
Super lightweight (140 lbs)	Samantha Worthington (Interim)	26 July 2025	447
Welterweight (147 lbs)	Lauren Price	11 May 2024	888
Super welterweight (154 lbs)	Mikaela Mayer	30 October 2025	351
Middleweight (160 lbs)	Kaye Scott	20 December 2025	300
Super middleweight (168 lbs)	Franchón Crews-Dezurn	25 March 2024	935
Light heavyweight (175 lbs)	Che Kenneally	20 July 2024	818
Heavyweight (175+ lbs)	Claressa Shields	2 February 2025	621

== Affiliated organizations ==
- WBA Asia
- WBA Oceania
- Federación Latinoamericana de Comisiones de Boxeo Profesional (WBA Fedelatin)
- Federación Bolivariana de Boxeo (WBA Fedebol)
- Federación Centroamericana de Boxeo (WBA Fedecentro)
- Federación del Caribe de Boxeo (WBA Fedecaribe)
- North American Boxing Association (NABA)

== See also ==
- List of major boxing sanctioning bodies
- List of WBA world champions
- List of WBA female world champions
- List of current world boxing champions
