= Tsubasa Koura =

Japanese kickboxer and boxer

- Born: 小浦翼; 10 October 1994 (age 32); Yokohama, Japan
- Nationality: Japanese
- Height: 5 ft 4 in (163 cm)
- Weight: Mini-flyweight
- Style: Orthodox

Professional boxing record
- Total: 18
- Wins: 15
- By knockout: 10
- Losses: 2
- Draws: 1

Kickboxing record
- Total: 2
- Wins: 0
- Losses: 2
- By knockout: 0

Tsubasa Koura (born 10 October 1994) is a Japanese kickboxer and former professional boxer, who held the OPBF mini-flyweight title from 2017 to 2019.

== Professional boxing career ==
=== Early career ===
Koura fought 29 times during his amateur career and won 19 times, with six of those victories coming by way of stoppage. Due to his lack of major success as an amateur, Koura was given a C-class boxing license by the JBC, meaning he would have to begin his career by competing in four round fights.

Koura made his professional debut against Naoki Morooka on 22 August 2014, at the Korakuen Hall in Tokyo, Japan. He won the fight by a first-round technical knockout. Koura made his second professional appearance five months later, on 28 January 2015, against Hanto Tsukada. He won the fight by a second-round technical knockout.

Koura fought a rematch with Naoki Morooka on the undercard of DANGAN 135, on 28 July 2015, in the qualifying round of the 2015 East Japan "Rookie of the Year" tournament. He won the fight by a fourth-round knockout. This victory earned Koura a place in the tournament semifinals, held on 24 September 2015, where he faced Yuto Takahashi. He won the fight by unanimous decision, with scores of 40–36, 39–37 and 39–37. Koura faced Hizuki Saso in the tournament finals, which were held on 3 November 2015, in what was the first five-round bout of Koura's career. He won the fight by 50–45, 50–46 and 49–46, and was furthermore awarded the "Most Skilled" award as well. After winning the East Japan rookie tournament, Koura faced Ryusei Kitamura for the 2015 All Japan "Rookie of the Year" title on 20 December 2015. He won the fight by unanimous decision, with scores of 50–44, 50–44 and 49–45.

=== Regional champion ===
==== OPBF mini-flyweight champion ====
Koura faced the debuting Chanai Jaikrajang on 14 April 2016. Koura knocked Chanai down with a one-two combination in the third round. He furthermore knocked Chanai down twice more in the fourth round, which forced the referee to wave the fight off. Koura faced Bimbo Nacionales on the undercard of DANGAN 190 on 28 July 2016. He won the fight by a knockout, 41 seconds into the second round. Koura was scheduled to face Jeffrey Galero, his most experienced opponent to date, on 19 December 2016. He won the fight by a second-round technical knockout

Koura faced the Filipino journeyman Jaysever Abcede for the vacant OPBF mini-flyweight title on 29 July 2017. Koura utilized his jab and footwork to outbox Abcede for the first three rounds, before finally knocking him down with a left hook to the body at the very end of the fourth round. Abcede failed to raise in time for the ten count and was officially counted out at the 3:09 minute mark.

Koura faced the future WBO mini-flyweight champion Masataka Taniguchi in his first title defense on 11 November 2017. He won the fight by a close majority decision, with scores of 115–114, 115–113 and 114–114. Although Taniguchi was leading on the scorecards heading into the ninth round, Koura managed to rally in the championship round to narrowly edge him out.

Koura made his second title defense against Norihito Tanaka on 17 April 2018. He won the fight by a fifth-round technical knockout. Tanaka was leading the fight on all three of the judges' scorecards at the time of the stoppage. Koura made his third title defense against the undefeated Daiki Tomita on 29 September 2018. He won the fight by unanimous decision, with scores of 117–110, 119–108 and 119–108.

Koura was scheduled to make his third title defense against the experienced Lito Dante on 31 March 2019. Despite coming into the bout as a favorite, Koura lost by technical knockout in the twelfth round.

==== Post title reign ====
Koura returned from a near year-long absence from the sport to face Ariston Aton on 27 February 2020. He won the fight by a third-round technical knockout. Aton was staggered by a strike in the third round which prompted the referee to wave the fight off, although Aton immediately protested the stoppage.

Koura faced the former Japanese Youth light-flyweight champion Yudai Shigeoka for the vacant WBO Asia Pacific mini-flyweight title on 12 November 2021. Shigeoka won the fight by majority decision, with two judges awarding him a 115–113 scorecard, while the third judge scored it as a 114–114 draw.

Despite his loss to Shigeoka, Koura was booked to challenge the reigning WBC mini-flyweight champion Panya Pradabsri, in what was Pradabsri's third title defense. The bout was scheduled as the main event of a card which took place in Nakhon Ratchasima, Thailand on 30 August 2022. on 16 August, it was announced that Panya would instead face Koura's countryman Norihito Tanaka. On 23 August 2022, it was announced that Koura would fight at the "Phoenix Battle 93" event, which was held at the Korakuen Hall in Tokyo, Japan, against an opponent which would be announced at a later date.

Koura faced ArAr Andales, who was the time ranked as the #8 mini flyweight contender by the WBO, on 25 October 2022. The fight was ruled a draw by technical decision, 38 seconds into the second round, as Koura was unable to continue competing to a cut above his right eye, which was caused by an inadvertent clash of heads.

Koura was expected to face Yuni Takada for the vacant Japanese minimumweight title on 16 February 2023, on the undercard of "Phoenix Battle 97". He withdrew from the day at the official weigh-ins, as he failed to make championship weight.

== Professional kickboxing career ==
Koura made his professional kickboxing debut against Yusei Shirahata at Krush 156 on December 17, 2023.

== Professional boxing record ==
| 18 fights | 15 wins | 2 losses |
|---|---|---|
| By knockout | 10 | 1 |
| By decision | 5 | 1 |
| Draws | 1 | |

| No. | Result | Record | Opponent | Type | Round, time | Date | Location | Notes |
|---|---|---|---|---|---|---|---|---|
| 18 | Draw | 15–2–1 | Ar Ar Andales | TD | 2 (8), 0:38 | 25 Oct 2022 | Korakuen Hall, Tokyo, Japan | |
| 17 | Loss | 15–2 | Yudai Shigeoka | MD | 12 | 12 Nov 2021 | Korakuen Hall, Tokyo, Japan | For vacant WBO Asia Pacific mini-flyweight title |
| 16 | Win | 15–1 | Ariston Aton | TKO | 3 (5), 0:41 | 27 Feb 2020 | Korakuen Hall, Tokyo, Japan | |
| 15 | Loss | 14–1 | Lito Dante | TKO | 12 (12), 1:18 | 31 Mar 2019 | Osanbashi Hall, Yokohama, Japan | Lost OPBF mini-flyweight title |
| 14 | Win | 14–0 | Daiki Tomita | UD | 12 | 29 Sep 2018 | Korakuen Hall, Tokyo, Japan | Retained OPBF mini-flyweight title |
| 13 | Win | 13–0 | Norihito Tanaka | TKO | 5 (12), 2:38 | 17 Apr 2018 | Korakuen Hall, Tokyo, Japan | Retained OPBF mini-flyweight title |
| 12 | Win | 12–0 | Masataka Taniguchi | MD | 12 | 11 Nov 2017 | Korakuen Hall, Tokyo, Japan | Retained OPBF mini-flyweight title |
| 11 | Win | 11–0 | Jaysever Abcede | KO | 4 (12), 3:09 | 29 Jul 2017 | Korakuen Hall, Tokyo, Japan | Won vacant OPBF mini-flyweight title |
| 10 | Win | 10–0 | Chaowalit Choedram | TKO | 2 (6), 0:25 | 15 May 2017 | Korakuen Hall, Tokyo, Japan | |
| 9 | Win | 9–0 | Jeffrey Galero | TKO | 2 (8), 2:44 | 19 Dec 2016 | Korakuen Hall, Tokyo, Japan | |
| 8 | Win | 8–0 | Bimbo Nacionales | KO | 2 (6), 0:41 | 28 Jul 2016 | Korakuen Hall, Tokyo, Japan | |
| 7 | Win | 7–0 | Chanai Jaikrajang | TKO | 4 (6), 2:45 | 14 Apr 2016 | Korakuen Hall, Tokyo, Japan | |
| 6 | Win | 6–0 | Ryusei Kitamura | UD | 5 | 20 Dec 2015 | Korakuen Hall, Tokyo, Japan | Won All Japan Rookie of the Year title |
| 5 | Win | 5–0 | Hizuki Saso | UD | 5 | 3 Nov 2015 | Korakuen Hall, Tokyo, Japan | Won East Japan Rookie of the Year title |
| 4 | Win | 4–0 | Yuto Takahashi | UD | 4 | 24 Sep 2015 | Korakuen Hall, Tokyo, Japan | |
| 3 | Win | 3–0 | Naoki Morooka | TKO | 4 (4), 1:54 | 28 Jul 2015 | Korakuen Hall, Tokyo, Japan | |
| 2 | Win | 2–0 | Hanto Tsukada | TKO | 2 (4), 1:26 | 28 Jan 2015 | Korakuen Hall, Tokyo, Japan | |
| 1 | Win | 1–0 | Naoki Morooka | TKO | 1 (4), 2:22 | 22 Aug 2014 | Korakuen Hall, Tokyo, Japan | |

== Kickboxing record ==
Professional Kickboxing Record
0 Wins (0 (T)KO's), 2 Losses, 0 Draw, 0 No Contest
| Date | Result | Opponent | Event | Location | Method | Round | Time |
| 2024-04-28 | Loss | (Japan) Kakeru Nagano | Krush 160 | Tokyo, Japan | Decision (Unanimous) | 3 | 3:00 |
| 2023-12-17 | Loss | (Japan) Yusei Shirahata | Krush 156 | Tokyo, Japan | Decision (Unanimous) | 3 | 3:00 |
Legend: Win Loss Draw/No contest Notes
