= Daniel Matellon =

Cuban boxer (born 1988)

Personal information
- Born: Daniel Matellon Ramos; 2 February 1988 (age 38) Havana, Cuba
- Height: 5 ft 3 in (160 cm)
- Weight: Light flyweight; Flyweight

Boxing career
- Stance: Orthodox

Boxing record
- Total fights: 16
- Wins: 13
- Win by KO: 7
- Losses: 1
- Draws: 2

Daniel Matellon Ramos (born 2 February 1988) is a Cuban professional boxer who held the WBA interim light flyweight title from February to August 2021.

== Professional career ==
Matellon made his professional debut against Johnny Garay on October 21, 2016. He won the fight by unanimous decision. He would go on to amass a 4-0-2 record before his first major title fight.

In his seventh professional fight, Matellon was scheduled to fight Kenny Cano for the vacant WBA Fedelatin light flyweight title, on September 30, 2017. Matellon won the fight by unanimous decision, with all three judges scoring the fight 105–104 in his favor.

Matellon was scheduled to defend his title against Camilo Mendoza on March 10, 2018. Matellon won the fight by a sixth-round knockout. Mendoza and his corner later disputed the victory, claiming the knockdown was a result of a head clash.

Matellon's next two fights were non-title bouts. He scored a second-round knockout of Fernando Godinez on May 4, 2018, and won a split decision against Masamichi Yabuki on September 29, 2018. Matellon was then scheduled to make his second title defense against Mario Andrade on April 30, 2019. He beat Andrade by a second-round knockout.

Matellon compiled a record of 11–0–2 before defeating Erik Lopez via majority decision (MD) to win the WBA interim light-flyweight title on 7 February 2020 at the Roberto Durán Arena in Panama.

Following a first-round knockout of Luis de la Rosa, in a non-title bout, Matellon was scheduled to fight Luis de la Rosa for the vacant WBA interim light flyweight title. Matellon outboxed his opponent to a majority decision victory, with two of the judges scoring the fight 116-112 for Matellon, while the third judge scored the fight as a 114–114 draw.

Matellon was scheduled to make his first WBA Interim title defense against the former IBF mini flyweight champion Jose Argumedo on June 26, 2021. Matellon won the fight by unanimous decision, with scorecards of 117–111, 115-113 and 115–113. Matellon next faced Ivan Garcia for the vacant WBA Fedecaribe light flyweight title on July 16, 2022. He won the fight by a third-round knockout.

Matellon faced the former WBA (Regular) light flyweight champion Carlos Cañizales in a WBA light flyweight title eliminator on June 10, 2023, at the Casino Buenos Aires in Buenos Aires, Argentina. He lost the fight by an eighth-round technical decision, with two judges scoring the bout 77–73 for Cañizales and the third judge awarding the former champion a 76–74 scorecard. Matellon was deducted a point in the second and eighth round for repeated headbutts, with the fight eventually being stopped due to a cut above Cañizales' left eye, which was caused by one such headbutt in the second round.

== Professional boxing record ==
16 fights	13 wins	1 loss
By knockout	7	0
By decision	6	1
Draws	2	

No.	Result	Record	Opponent	Type	Round, time	Date	Location	Notes
16	Loss	13–1–2	Carlos Cañizales	TD	8 (12), 3:00	10 Jun 2023	Casino Buenos Aires, Buenos Aires, Argentina	
15	Win	13–0–2	Ivan Garcia Carrillo	KO	3 (10), 1:02	16 Jul 2022	Los Andes Mall, Panama City, Panama	Won vacant WBA Fedecaribe light flyweight title
14	Win	12–0–2	José Argumedo	UD	12	26 Jun 2021	Arena Alcalde, Guadalajara, Mexico	Retained WBA interim light flyweight title
13	Win	11–0–2	Erik Omar Lopez	MD	12	7 Feb 2020	Roberto Durán Arena, Panama City, Panama	Won vacant WBA interim light flyweight title
12	Win	10–0–2	Luis de la Rosa	KO	1 (8), 1:21	31 Jul 2019	Fantastic Casino de Albrook Mall, Panama City, Panama	
11	Win	9–0–2	Mario Andrade	KO	2 (11), 0:35	30 Apr 2019	Fantastic Casino de Albrook Mall, Panama City, Panama	Retained WBA Fedelatin light flyweight title
10	Win	8–0–2	Masamichi Yabuki	SD	8	29 Sep 2018	Korakuen Hall, Tokyo, Japan	
9	Win	7–0–2	Fernando Ramon Godinez	KO	2 (8), 0:47	4 May 2018	Fantastic Casino de Albrook Mall, Panama City, Panama	
8	Win	6–0–2	Camilo Mendoza	KO	6 (11), 0:23	10 Mar 2018	Hotel Veneto, Panama City, Panama	Retained WBA Fedelatin light flyweight title
7	Win	5–0–2	Kenny Cano	UD	11	30 Sep 2017	Hotel Veneto, Panama City, Panama	Won vacant WBA Fedelatin light flyweight title
6	Win	4–0–2	Yenrry Bermudez	TKO	4 (6)	11 Aug 2017	Club Arabe de Colon, Colón, Panama	
5	Win	3–0–2	Jonathan Arias	UD	6	30 Jun 2017	Los Andes Mall, Panama City, Panama	
4	Draw	2–0–2	Azael Villar	PTS	6	16 Feb 2017	Centro de Convenciones Vasco Núñez, Panama City, Panama	
3	Draw	2–0–1	Argenis Cheremo	SD	4	1 Dec 2016	Los Andes Mall, Panama City, Panama	
2	Win	2–0	Marcos Arrieta	TKO	2 (4), 2:18	5 Nov 2016	Jardin Tacita de Oro, Parita, Panama	
1	Win	1–0	Johnny Garay	UD	4	21 Oct 2016	Los Andes Mall, Panama City, Panama	

Sporting positions
Regional boxing titles
Vacant Title last held by Carlos Cañizales	WBA Fedelatin light flyweight champion 30 September 2017 – 2020; Vacated	Vacant Title next held by Leandro Blanc
World boxing titles
Vacant Title last held by Randy Petalcorin	WBA light flyweight champion Interim title 7 February 2020 – 25 August 2021; Stripped	Title discontinued
