= Esteban Bermudez =

Mexican boxer

Personal information
- Born: Esteban Bermudez Salas; 11 October 1995 (age 31) Nezahualcóyotl, Mexico
- Height: 5 ft 7 in (170 cm)
- Weight: Light flyweight

Boxing career
- Stance: Orthodox

Boxing record
- Total fights: 20
- Wins: 14
- Win by KO: 10
- Losses: 4
- Draws: 2

Esteban Bermudez Salas (born 11 October 1995) is a Mexican professional boxer who has held the WBA (Regular) light flyweight title from 2021 to 2022.

== Professional career ==
Bermudez made his professional debut against Ricardo Sanchez on March 7, 2013. He won the fight by decision. He would go on to amass a 13–3–2 record, before fighting for his first world title.

Bermudez was scheduled to fight the reigning WBA (Regular) light flyweight champion Carlos Cañizales on May 28, 2021. This was Cañizales' first title defense in over two years, having last defended the title against Sho Kimura on May 26, 2019. Bermudez entered the bout as a significant underdog, with one journalist stating Cañizales was "a class above Bermudez". Bermudez won the fight by a sixth-round knockout. He knocked down the champion near the end of the round with two overhand rights, and although Cañizales managed to beat the count, he was once again knocked down two seconds after the count.

On June 10, 2021, the WBA ordered the reigning WBA Super champion Hiroto Kyoguchi to face Bermudez in a title unification match.

== Professional boxing record ==
20 fights	14 wins	4 losses
By knockout	10	2
By decision	4	2
Draws	2	

No.	Result	Record	Opponent	Type	Round, time	Date	Location	Notes
20	Loss	14–4–2	Hiroto Kyoguchi	TKO	8 (12) 0:24	Jun 10, 2022	Domo Alcalde, Guadalajara, Mexico	For WBA (Super) and The Ring light-flyweight titles
19	Win	14–3–2	Carlos Cañizales	TKO	6 (12), 2:34	May 28, 2021	Foro Viena, Mexico City, Mexico	Won WBA (Regular) light-flyweight title
18	Draw	13–3–2	Luis Manuel Macias	TD	3 (8), 0:57	Mar 13, 2021	Hacienda de San Andres, Magdalena de Kino, Mexico	Accidental headbutt
17	Win	13–3–1	Javier Marquez Clemente	TKO	3 (6), 1:55	Dec 4, 2020	Gym Guerrera Torres, Ciudad Nezahualcoyotl, Mexico	
16	Loss	12–3–1	Rosendo Hugo Guarneros	UD	10	Oct 30, 2020	Arena José Sulaimán, Monterrey, Mexico	
15	Win	12–2–1	Oswaldo Novoa	KO	4 (8), 2:20	Oct 4, 2019	Gimnasio Mexico 68, Guadalajara, Mexico	
14	Win	11–2–1	Gabriel Ramirez Anaya	RTD	4 (6), 3:00	Aug 29, 2019	Salon Sagitario, Ciudad Nezahualcoyotl, Mexico	
13	Win	10–2–1	Ivan Ochoa Sanchez	UD	6	Apr 16, 2016	Arena Neza, Ciudad Nezahualcoyotl, Mexico	
12	Loss	9–2–1	Gilberto Parra	UD	8	Feb 13, 2016	Centro de Usos Multiples, Ciudad Obregon, Mexico	
11	Loss	9–1–1	Francisco Perez Cardenas	KO	1 (6), 2:41	Oct 10, 2015	Mexico City Arena, Mexico City, Mexico	
10	Win	9–0–1	Julio Cesar Lopez	RTD	6 (8), 3:00	Jun 13, 2015	Arena Azteca Budokan, Ciudad Nezahualcoyotl, Mexico	
9	Win	8–0–1	Juan Alberto Castro	UD	4	Nov 8, 2014	Gimnasio Nuevo León Unido, Monterrey, Mexico	
8	Win	7–0–1	Felipe Imbilimbo	KO	2 (4), 1:46	Oct 10, 2014	Jose Cuervo Salon, Polanco, Mexico	
7	Draw	6–0–1	Ivan Ochoa Sanchez	TD	4 (6), 2:24	May 24, 2014	Gimnasio Carlos Zárate, Cuautla, Mexico	Bermudez had a severe cut due to a clash of heads.
6	Win	6–0	Carlos Uriga	KO	2 (4), 0:06	Feb 15, 2014	Palenque de la Feria Mesoamericana, Tapachula, Mexico	
5	Win	5–0	Arturo Garibay	TKO	2 (6), 1:22	Jan 4, 2014	Deportivo Guelatao, Cuernavaca, Mexico	
4	Win	4–0	Juan Carlos Rodriguez	SD	4	Aug 1, 2013	Jose Cuervo Salon, Polanco, Mexico	
3	Win	3–0	Fernando Monroy	SD	4	Jun 27, 2013	Jose Cuervo Salon, Polanco, Mexico	
2	Win	2–0	Ivan Ramirez	TKO	4 (4), 2:57	May 30, 2013	Jose Cuervo Salon, Polanco, Mexico	
1	Win	1–0	Ricardo Sanchez	RTD	2 (4), 3:00	Mar 7, 2013	Jose Cuervo Salon, Polanco, Mexico	

== See also ==
- List of world light-flyweight boxing champions

Sporting positions
World boxing titles
Preceded by Carlos Cañizales	WBA light-flyweight champion Regular title May 28, 2021 – June 10, 2022; Lost bid for Super title	Title discontinued
