= Yudai Shigeoka =

Japanese boxer (born 1997)

Yudai Shigeoka 重岡優大
Personal information
- Born: 16 April 1997 (age 29) Kumamoto, Kumamoto, Japan
- Height: 5 ft 3 in (160 cm)
- Weight: Mini flyweight; Light flyweight

Boxing career
- Reach: 64 in (163 cm)
- Stance: Southpaw

Boxing record
- Total fights: 11
- Wins: 9
- Win by KO: 5
- Losses: 2

Yudai Shigeoka (Japanese: 重岡優大, Shigeoka Yudai; born 16 April 1997) is a Japanese former professional boxer who held the World Boxing Council (WBC) mini-flyweight title from 2023 to 2024. As of November 2023, he is ranked as the world's best active mini-flyweight by BoxRec.

== Early life ==
Yudai is the older brother of fellow boxer and also a world champion Ginjiro Shigeoka.

== Amateur career ==
While attending the Kaishin High School, Shigeoka won four national titles as a pinweight. In 2018, Shigeoka won the All Japan Boxing Championship as a light flyweight, and reached the finals of the World University Championships in Russia, once again as a light flyweight. Shigeoka intended to compete in the 2020 Olympic Games while attending the Takushoku University, but decided to drop out of university and become a professional after the junior flyweight division was expunged from the Games. Shigeoka was given his professional boxing license on August 1, 2019. He finished his amateur career with a record of 82–10, with 20 victories coming by way of stoppage.

== Professional career ==
Shigeoka made his professional debut on 30 October 2019, against Manop Audomphanawari, at the Korakuen Hall in Tokyo, Japan. He won the fight by technical knockout in the second round, dropping Manop with repeated body shots at the 2:16 minute mark. Two months later, on 10 December 2019, Shigeoka was scheduled to face the reigning OPBF minimumweight champion Lito Dante in a six-round non-title bout. He won the fight by unanimous decision, with scores of 59–55, 60-54 and 59–55.

Shigeoka was scheduled to fight Ryu Horikawa for the vacant Japanese Youth light flyweight title on 11 February 2021, after a fourteen-month layoff. He won the fight by a fifth-round technical knockout. Horikawa was first knocked down with a left straight in the third round, and once again in the fifth round. Following the second knockdown, referee Akihiko Katsuragi decided to wave the fight off. Shigeoka vacated the title on August 2, 2021.

Shigeoka was scheduled to face the former OPBF minimumweight champion Tsubasa Koura for the vacant WBO Asia Pacific mini flyweight title on 12 November 2021. It was Shigeoka's first career twelve round bout. Koura was furthermore seen as a huge step up in class compared to his previous opponents. Shigeoka won the closely contested fight by majority decision, with two judges scoring the fight 115–113 in his favor, while the third judge scored the fight as a 114–114 draw. Shigeoka was booked to make his first title defense against the #10 ranked challenger Cris Ganoza on July 7, 2022. Shigeoka won the fight by a third-round knockout, after dropping Ganoza with a left hook to the body, which left him unable to beat the ten-count.

Shigeoka faced the #1 ranked Japanese minimumweight contender in a Japanese title eliminator on 17 November 2022. The bout was later upgraded to a vacant Japanese title bout, as Shigeoka's brother Ginjiro vacated the belt on 29 July. He won the fight by a third-round knockout. Shigeoka vacated the title on 2 December 2022.

=== Shigeoka vs. Méndez ===
Shigeoka was expected to challenge Petchmanee CP Freshmart for the WBC mini-flyweight title on 23 April 2023, at the Yoyogi National Gymnasium in Tokyo, Japan. The title fight was booked as the headliner of "3150Fight Vol. 5", which was to be broadcast by Abema TV. Petchmanee withdrew from the fight on April 4. Shigeoka was rescheduled to face the former WBO mini flyweight champion Wilfredo Méndez for the interim WBC title instead, with the winner being designated as a mandatory challenger for Petchmanee. Shigeoka knocked Méndez down late in the fifth round and at the 0:25 minute mark of the seventh round, which proved to be the final strike of the fight, as the Puerto Rican boxer was unable to rise from the canvas in time to beat the count.

=== Shigeoka vs. Pradabsri ===
Kameda Promotions successfully won a purse bid, held by the World Boxing Council on 7 August 2023, for a title unification bout between Shigeoka and full champion Panya Pradabsri, with a bid of $213,000. Shigeoka captured the title by unanimous decision, with scores of 117–111, 119–109, and 119–109. During the post-fight press conference, Shigeoka revealed he had broken both his hands in the fifth round of the contest.

=== Shigeoka vs. Jerusalem ===
On March 31, 2024, in Nagoya, Japan, Shigeoka was scheduled to make the first defense of his WBC minimumweight title against Melvin Jerusalem. Shigeoka was dropped in the third and sixth rounds en route to losing a split decision to the former world champion Jerusalem.

=== Retirement ===
In August 2025, Shigeoka announced his retirement to focus on supporting his brother Ginjiro, who has been in a coma since a boxing match in May 2025.

== Professional boxing record ==
11 fights	9 wins	2 losses
By knockout	5	0
By decision	4	2

No.	Result	Record	Opponent	Type	Round, time	Date	Location	Notes
11	Loss	9–2	Melvin Jerusalem	UD	12	30 Mar 2025	Aichi Sky Expo, Tokoname, Japan	For WBC mini-flyweight title
10	Win	9–1	Samuel Salva	UD	10	28 Aug 2024	Yamato Arena, Suita, Japan	
9	Loss	8–1	Melvin Jerusalem	SD	12	31 Mar 2024	International Conference Hall, Nagoya, Japan	Lost WBC mini-flyweight title
8	Win	8–0	Panya Pradabsri	UD	12	7 Oct 2023	Ota City General Gymnasium, Ōta, Japan	Won WBC mini-flyweight title
7	Win	7–0	Wilfredo Méndez	KO	7 (12), 0:25	16 Apr 2023	Yoyogi National Gymnasium, Tokyo, Japan	Won interim WBC mini-flyweight title
6	Win	6–0	Tatsuro Nakashima	KO	3 (10), 1:20	17 Nov 2022	Korakuen Hall, Tokyo, Japan	Won vacant Japanese mini-flyweight title
5	Win	5–0	Cris Ganoza	KO	3 (12), 0:59	6 Jul 2022	Kumamoto Prefectural Gymnasium, Kumamoto, Japan	Retained WBO Asia Pacific mini-flyweight title
4	Win	4–0	Tsubasa Koura	MD	12	12 Nov 2021	Korakuen Hall, Tokyo, Japan	Won vacant WBO Asia Pacific mini-flyweight title
3	Win	3–0	Ryu Horikawa	TKO	5 (8), 2:42	11 Feb 2021	Korakuen Hall, Tokyo, Japan	Won vacant Japanese Youth light-flyweight title
2	Win	2–0	Lito Dante	UD	6	10 Dec 2021	Korakuen Hall, Tokyo, Japan	
1	Win	1–0	Manop Audomphanawari	TKO	2 (6), 2:16	30 Oct 2021	Korakuen Hall, Tokyo, Japan	

== See also ==
- Notable boxing families
- List of southpaw stance boxers
- Boxing in Japan
- List of Japanese boxing world champions
- List of world mini-flyweight boxing champions

Sporting positions
Regional boxing titles
Vacant Title last held by Rikito Shiba	Japanese Youth light-flyweight champion 11 February 2021 – 16 April 2023; Won interim title	Vacant Title next held by Kanamu Sakama
Vacant Title last held by Ginjiro Shigeoka	WBO Asia Pacific mini-flyweight champion 12 November 2021 – 2022; Vacated	Vacant Title next held by Goki Kobayashi
Vacant Title last held by Ginjiro Shigeoka	Japanese mini-flyweight champion 17 November 2022 – 16 April 2023; Won interim title	Vacant Title next held by Yuni Takada
World boxing titles
Vacant Title last held by Juan Palacios	WBC mini-flyweight champion Interim title 16 April 2023 – 7 October 2023; Won full title	Vacant
Preceded by Panya Pradabsri	WBC mini-flyweight champion 7 October 2023 – 31 March 2024	Succeeded by Melvin Jerusalem
