= Manny Pacquiao vs. Lucas Matthysse =

2018 boxing match

Fight of Champions
- Date: July 15, 2018
- Venue: Axiata Arena, Kuala Lumpur, Malaysia
- Title on the line: WBA (Regular) welterweight title

Tale of the tape
Boxer	Manny Pacquiao	Lucas Matthysse
Nickname	Pac-Man	"La Máquina" ("The Machine")
Hometown	General Santos, Philippines	Trelew, Argentina
Pre-fight record	59–7–2 (38 KO)	39–4 (1) (36 KO)
Age	39 years, 6 months	35 years, 9 months
Height	5 ft 5 1/2 in (166 cm)	5 ft 6 in (168 cm)
Weight	146 lb (66 kg)	146 3/4 lb (67 kg)
Style	Southpaw	Orthodox
Recognition	WBA; No. 1 Ranked Welterweight; TBRB; No. 5 Ranked Welterweight; The Ring; No. 6 Ranked Welterweight; 8-division world champion	The Ring; No. 8 Ranked Welterweight; WBA (Regular); Welterweight Champion

Result
- Pacquiao wins via 7th-round TKO

Manny Pacquiao vs. Lucas Matthysse, billed as Fight of Champions, was a boxing match for the WBA (Regular) welterweight championship. The event took place on July 15, 2018 at the Axiata Arena in Kuala Lumpur, Malaysia. Pacquiao won the fight by 7th-round TKO, his 39th and most recent victory inside the distance as of March 2026.

== Background ==
On January 16, 2018 it was first reported that Pacquiao would return to the ring on the undercard of Terence Crawford vs. Jeff Horn for the WBO welterweight championship on April 21. Bob Arum wanted the card to take place at the T-Mobile Arena in Las Vegas and have the card take place on ESPN PPV. Early rumours indicated he would fight 37 year old former WBO light welterweight champion Mike Alvarado (38–4, 26 KO). On February 2, after winning the vacant WBA (Regular) welterweight title against Tewa Kiram, Lucas Matthysse (39–4–0–1, 36 KO) stated he was interested in fighting Pacquiao next. Freddie Roach as well as Golden Boy Promotions' Eric Gomez liked the idea of the fight happening. Arum was also open to fight taking place, but stated it wouldn't happen next as he was likely to match Pacquiao with Alvarado. On March 1, Pacquiao withdrew from the Crawford-Horn card. According to Aquiles Zonio, Pacquiao's media relations officer, Pacquiao felt it was insult to have him in a non-main event role and felt he was the obvious ticket seller for the card, also believing he beat Horn in their fight in 2017. In an interview Pacquiao told ABS-CBN television he would fight in Malaysia, where he has a group willing to put up the necessary funds, in May or June 2018. It was said that Pacquiao's MP Promotions would promote the event with a confirmed date of June 24. Arum played down the talks and said the fight had not been finalized. Pacquiao started training for the potential bout on March 12. Although the fight wasn't officially announced, the date was pushed back to July 8. Pacquiao explained the reason the date had changed was because June 24 would have fallen 10 days after the Islamic month, Ramadan and more than 60% of Malaysia's population are Muslim.

On April 2, 2018 the fight was officially confirmed for July 15 in Kuala Lumpur, Malaysia. Pacquiao would go into the fight without long-time trainer Freddie Roach and instead be trained by his life-long friend Buboy Fernandez, who had served as an assistant trainer in previous fights. It would mark the first time in 34 fights, since 2001 that Roach would not be in Pacquiao's corner. It was noted that Top Rank would deal with the television distribution of the fight in the United States (US) with the fight taking place on ESPN+, at the time, ESPN's new monthly subscription streaming service. Due to the time difference, the fight was scheduled on morning local time so that the broadcast of the event would take place during the primetime hours (on July 14) in the United States. On April 13, it was officially rumored that Pacquiao had parted ways with Roach. However, on April 15, Pacquiao revealed via social media that he had not decided on who would train him for the bout against Matthysse. On May 18, according to sources in Argentina, the fight was in jeopardy and likely to be postponed. However, Pacquiao denied the reports a day later and called the rumours "malicious and untrue." By July 1, there were still doubts around the fight taking place, notably from Bob Arum. However, Pacquiao told Philboxing.com the preparations were in the final stages and the funds would be released to Golden Boy in the coming days. On July 2, Golden Boy and Matthysse confirmed receipt of funds and proposed to fly out to Malaysia the next day.

== Fight details ==
Pacquiao scored his first knockout in over 8 years by stopping Matthysse in round 7 to win the WBA (Regular) welterweight title. Pacquiao dropped Matthysse a total of 3 times before the fight was stopped. The knockdowns occurred in rounds 3, 5 and 7. Matthysse took a knee in the 5th round and was decked by a left hook in the 7th, following a combination. Referee Kenny Bayless began the count, stopping the fight at 2 minutes and 43 seconds after Matthysse spat out his mouthpiece. At the time of the stoppage, all three judges had the bout 59–53 in favor of Pacquiao. Speaking about the game plan, Pacquiao said, "Matthysse has the power, so hands up all the time and do my best. I'm surprised because Matthysse is a very tough opponent and I knocked him down. I was focused and patient in the fight, and I worked hard in training. We did a good job in training. We were pushing hard." Matthysse had no excuses, stating he lost to "a great fighter and a great champion." At the post-fight press conference, Pacquiao confirmed he would continue boxing. According to CompuBox, Pacquiao landed 95 of 344 punches thrown (28%), this included a 44% connect rate on his power punches. Matthysse landed 57 of his 246 thrown (23%), only landing in double figures in round 6.

== Aftermath ==
Matthysse announced his retirement shortly after the bout.

== Fight card ==
Confirmed bouts:

Weight Class	Weight		vs.		Method	Round	Time	Notes
Welterweight	147 lbs.	(Philippines) Manny Pacquiao	def.	(Argentina) Lucas Matthysse (c)	TKO	7/12	2:43	^{Note 1}
Featherweight	126 lbs.	(Philippines) Jhack Tepora	def.	(Mexico) Edivaldo Ortega	TKO	9/12		^{Note 2}
Junior flyweight	108 lbs.	(Venezuela) Carlos Cañizales (c)	def.	(China) Lü Bin	TKO	12/12	2:59	^{Note 3}
Flyweight	112 lbs.	(South Africa) Moruti Mthalane	def.	(Pakistan) Muhammad Waseem	UD	12/12	3:00	^{Note 4}
Super bantamweight	122 lbs.	(Philippines) Juan Miguel Elorde	def.	(Thailand) Ratchanon Sawangsoda	TKO	3/6	2:58
Featherweight	126 lbs.	(Malaysia) Aiman Abu Bakar	def.	(Indonesia) Abdi	UD	4/4
Welterweight	147 lbs.	(Malaysia) Theena Thayalan	draw	(India) Siddharth Varma	Draw	4/4	3:00

^Note 1 For WBA (Regular) welterweight title
^Note 2 For interim WBA featherweight title
^Note 3 For WBA (Regular) junior flyweight title
^Note 4 For vacant IBF flyweight title

== Broadcasting ==
Country	Broadcaster			
Country	Free-to-air	Cable/pay television	PPV	Stream
Australia	—N/a		Main Event	—N/a
Canada	—N/a			TSN
Chile	TVN	—N/a		
Indonesia	SCTV	Nexmedia	—N/a	Vidio
Latin America (exclude Brazil and Mexico)	Space	TNT Sports	—N/a	
Malaysia	TV1	Astro SuperSport	—N/a	MyKlik
Malaysia	TV1	Astro SuperSport	—N/a	Astro GO
(Middle East and North Africa) MENA	—N/a		OSN Sports Box Office	OSN Play
Mexico	Azteca 7	—N/a		Azteca En Vivo
New Zealand	—N/a		SKY Arena	—N/a
Philippines	ABS-CBN*	ABS-CBN S+A*	Cignal PPV	—N/a
Philippines	The 5 Network (ESPN 5/AksyonTV)*	Hyper*	Sky PPV	—N/a
Philippines	GMA Network*	—N/a		
Sub-Saharan Africa	—N/a	SuperSport	—N/a	DStv Now
Thailand	PPTV	—N/a		PPTV
United Kingdom	—N/a	BoxNation	—N/a	TVPlayer
United States	—N/a			ESPN+

* Delayed telecast

Preceded by vs. Jeff Horn	Manny Pacquiao's bouts July 15, 2018	Succeeded by vs. Adrien Broner
Preceded by vs. Tewa Kiram	Lucas Matthysse's bouts July 15, 2018	Retired
