= Carlos Cañizales =

Venezuelan boxer (born 1993)

Personal information
- Nickname: CCC
- Born: Carlos Antonio Cañizales Civira; 11 March 1993 (age 33) Caracas, Venezuela
- Height: 5 ft 3 in (160 cm)
- Weight: Light-flyweight

Boxing career
- Reach: 64 1/2 in (164 cm)
- Stance: Orthodox

Boxing record
- Total fights: 33
- Wins: 28
- Win by KO: 20
- Losses: 4
- Draws: 1

Carlos Antonio Cañizales Civira (born 11 March 1993) is a Venezuelan professional boxer who held the World Boxing Association (WBA) light-flyweight title (Regular version) from 2018 to 2021 and the World Boxing Council (WBC) light-flyweight title in 2025.

== Professional career ==
=== WBA light–flyweight champion ===
Cañizales was scheduled to face Reiya Konishi for the vacant WBA (Regular) light flyweight title on 18 March 2018, at the Portopia Hotel in Kobe, Japan, and was broadcast by Fuji TV NEXT domestically. Cañizales was at the time the #1 ranked WBA light-flyweight contender, while Konishi came in as the #2 ranked contender. Cañizales won the fight by unanimous decision, with scores of 116–111, 115–112 and 114–113. The pivotal moment came in the third round when Cañizales knocked Konishi down with a right, which ended up putting Cañizales ahead on two of the judges' scorecards.

Cañizales made his first WBA Regular light-flyweight title defense against Lü Bin, in what was Bin's second professional bout, following a moderately successful amateur career. The title fight was scheduled for the undercard of the Manny Pacquiao vs. Lucas Matthysse welterweight championship fight on 15 July 2018. Cañizales began to take over from the fourth round onward, and knocked Bin down with a right in the eleventh round, which also opened a cut above his right eye. Cañizales knocked Bin down once more in the 12th round, which forced referee Gustavo Padilla to stop the fight at the very last second.

Cañizales made his second title defense against the former WBO flyweight champion Sho Kimura on 26 May 2019 at the Fuzhou Sports Center Gymnasium in Fuzhou, China. The bout was streamed by the WBA on their website. Cañizalez won the fight by a dominant unanimous decision, with scores of 118–110, 119–109 and 119–109.

Cañizales was scheduled to make his third title defense against Esteban Bermudez on 28 May 2021, following a two-year absence from the sport. Bermudez won the fight by a sixth-round knockout. He staggered Cañizales with an overhead right, and dropped him with a right hook shortly after. Although Cañizales was able to beat the eight count, he was knocked out just two seconds later.

Cañizales was scheduled to face German Valenzuela on 29 October 2021, in his first fight post title loss. He won the fight by unanimous decision, with scores of 98–92, 98–92 and 99–91. Cañizales dominated from the start, managing to outwork the taller Valenzuela for the majority of the fight.

On January 27, 2022, the WBA allowed Esteban Bermudez to make a voluntary title defense against Cañizales, as Kyoguchi withdrew from a scheduled purse bid due to an injury. However, Cañizales opted to face Ganigan López for the vacant WBA Continental Americas flyweight title on 26 March 2022. He won the fight by a fourth-round knockout, flooring López with a right hook at the 1:45 minute mark.

Cañizales faced Armando Torres for the vacant WBA Fedecaribe flyweight title on August 20, 2022, at the Blackberry Auditorium in Mexico City, Mexico. He won the fight by a first-round technical knockout, as Torres' corner threw in the towel at the 2:05 minute mark of the opening round.

Cañizales faced the #1 ranked WBA light flyweight contender, and former interim titlist, Daniel Matellon in a WBA title eliminator on June 10, 2023, at the Casino Buenos Aires in Buenos Aires, Argentina. He won the fight by technical decision, with two scorecards of 77–73 and one scorecard of 76–74. The fight was stopped at the end of the eighth round, on the advice of the ringside physician, due to a cut above Cañizales' left eye caused by a second-round headbutt. Matellon was deducted a point in both the second and the eighth round for repeated headbutts.

On 26 December 2024, Cañizales fought Panya Pradabsri for the vacant WBC light-flyweight title at Rajadamnern Stadium, Bangkok in Thailand, losing by majority decision with one ringside judge scoring the fight a 114–114 draw while the other two had it 115–113 and 116–112 respectively for his opponent.

A rematch with Panya Pradabsri took place at Poliedro de Caracas in Caracas, Venezuela on 1 August 2025. Cañizales won by knockout in the fifth round to claim the WBC light-flyweight title.

On 2 September 2026, he faced Daiya Kira for the vacant WBA (Super) light-flyweight title at Yokohama Buntai in Yokohama, Japan, losing by technical knockout in the seventh round.

== Professional boxing record ==
33 fights	28 wins	4 losses
By knockout	20	2
By decision	8	2
Draws	1	

No.	Result	Record	Opponent	Type	Round, time	Date	Location	Notes
33	Loss	28–4–1	Daiya Kira	TKO	7 (12), 0:38	2 Sep 2026	Yokohama Buntai, Yokohama, Japan	For vacant WBA light-flyweight title
32	Win	28–3–1	Panya Pradabsri	KO	5 (12), 2:52	1 Aug 2025	El Poliedro, Caracas, Venezuela	Won WBC light-flyweight title
31	Loss	27–3–1	Panya Pradabsri	MD	12	26 Dec 2024	Rajadamnern Stadium, Bangkok, Thailand	For vacant WBC light-flyweight title
30	Win	27–2–1	Ivan Garcia Balderas	MD	12	19 Jul 2024	Poliedro de Caracas, Caracas, Venezuela	Won vacant WBC Silver light-flyweight title
29	Loss	26–2–1	Kenshiro Teraji	MD	12	23 Jan 2024	Edion Arena Osaka, Osaka, Japan	For WBA (Super), WBC, and The Ring light-flyweight titles
28	Win	26–1–1	Daniel Matellon	TD	8 (12), 3:00	10 Jun 2023	Casino Buenos Aires, Buenos Aires, Argentina	
27	Win	25–1–1	Armando Torres	TKO	1 (10), 2:05	20 Aug 2022	Blackberry Auditorium, Mexico City, Mexico	Won vacant WBA Fedecentro light-flyweight title
26	Win	24–1–1	Ganigan López	KO	4 (10), 1:45	26 Mar 2022	Foro Centenario, Coyoacán, Mexico	
25	Win	23–1–1	German Valenzuela	UD	10	29 Oct 2021	Foro Viena, Mexico City, Mexico	Won vacant WBA Federacibe light-flyweight title
24	Loss	22–1–1	Esteban Bermudez	KO	6 (12), 2:34	28 May 2021	Foro Viena, Mexico City, Mexico	Lost WBA (Regular) light-flyweight title
23	Win	22–0–1	Sho Kimura	UD	12	26 May 2019	Fuzhou Sports Center Gymnasium, Fuzhou, China	Retained WBA (Regular) light-flyweight title
22	Win	21–0–1	Lü Bin	TKO	12 (12) 2:59	15 Jul 2018	Axiata Arena, Kuala Lumpur, Malaysia	Retained WBA (Regular) light-flyweight title
21	Win	20–0–1	Reiya Konishi	UD	12	18 Mar 2018	Portopia Hotel, Kobe, Japan	Won vacant WBA (Regular) light-flyweight title
20	Win	19–0–1	Yenrry Bermudez	RTD	4 (8), 3:00	29 Sep 2017	San Juan de los Morros, Venezuela	
19	Win	18–0–1	Argenis Cheremo	TKO	4 (8), 1:05	12 Aug 2017	Nuevo Circo, Caracas, Venezuela	
18	Win	17–0–1	Freddy Beleno	TKO	6 (10), 1:06	7 Apr 2017	Plaza El Urbanismo, Santa Rosa, Caracas, Venezuela	
17	Draw	16–0–1	Ryoichi Taguchi	SD	12	31 Dec 2016	Ota City General Gymnasium, Tokyo, Japan	For WBA light-flyweight title
16	Win	16–0	Vicente Mirabal	TKO	3 (8), 2:09	1 Oct 2016	Centro Recreacional Yesterday, Turmero, Venezuela	
15	Win	15–0	Yenrry Bermudez	TKO	6 (8), 1:27	22 Jul 2016	Plaza El Urbanismo, Caracas, Venezuela	
14	Win	14–0	Dionis Martinez	UD	8	4 Jun 2016	Centro Recreacional Yesterday, Turmero, Venezuela	
13	Win	13–0	Dallan Llovera	RTD	3 (6), 3:00	21 May 2016	Gimnasio Eliecer Otaiza, Caracas, Venezuela	
12	Win	12–0	Alexander Guarecuco	UD	6	5 Mar 2016	Plaza El Urbanismo, Santa Rosa, Caracas, Venezuela	
11	Win	11–0	Edicson Fuenmayor	TKO	1 (8), 2:03	29 Jan 2016	Gimnasio Mocho Navas, Petare, Venezuela	
10	Win	10–0	Rober Barrera	SD	11	10 Oct 2015	Poliedro de Caracas, Caracas, Venezuela	Won WBA Fedelatin light-flyweight title
9	Win	9–0	Kendry Perez	TKO	1 (8), 2:20	20 Jun 2015	Hotel Alba, Caracas, Venezuela	
8	Win	8–0	Edicson Fuenmayor	TKO	3 (10), 2:06	9 May 2015	Plaza El Urbanismo, Caracas, Venezuela	Won vacant Venezuelan light-flyweight title
7	Win	7–0	Vicente Mirabal	TKO	1 (6), 1:38	28 Mar 2015	Teatro Teresa Carreño, Caracas, Venezuela	
6	Win	6–0	Efren Luces	TKO	3 (4)	7 Mar 2015	Centro Recreacional Yesterday, Turmero, Venezuela	
5	Win	5–0	Geraid Benites	TKO	1 (4), 2:30	21 Feb 2015	Plaza El Urbanismo, Caracas, Venezuela	
4	Win	4–0	Nelson Magallanes	KO	1 (4), 1:53	31 Jan 2015	Estadio de Beisbol de Barranquita, Barranquitas, Venezuela	
3	Win	3–0	Vicente Mirabal	TKO	3 (4), 1:40	13 Dec 2014	Valle de la Pascua, Venezuela	
2	Win	2–0	Yosman Rengifo	TKO	3 (4), 2:35	11 Oct 2014	Polideportivo de Corinsa, Cagua, Venezuela	
1	Win	1–0	Edicson Fuenmayor	TKO	1 (4), 2:56	4 Jul 2014	El Velodromo Teo Capriles, Caracas, Venezuela	

== See also ==
- List of male boxers
- List of world light-flyweight boxing champions

Sporting positions
Regional boxing titles
Vacant Title last held by Freddy Beleno	Venezuelan light-flyweight champion 9 May 2015 – June 2015; Vacated	Vacant Title next held by Juan Lopez
Preceded by Rober Barrera	WBA Fedelatin light-flyweight champion 10 October 2015 – 2016; Vacated	Vacant Title next held by Daniel Matellon
Vacant Title last held by Gilberto Pedroza	WBA Fedecaribe light-flyweight champion 29 October 2021 – 2022; Vacated	Vacant Title next held by Daniel Matellon
Vacant Title last held by Axel Aragon Vega	WBA Fedecentro light-flyweight champion 20 August 2022 – 2023; Vacated	Vacant
Vacant Title last held by Erick Badillo	WBC Silver light-flyweight champion 19 July 2024 – 2024; Vacated	Vacant
World boxing titles
Vacant Title last held by Ryoichi Taguchi as Champion	WBA light-flyweight champion Regular title 18 March 2018 – 28 May 2021	Succeeded by Esteban Bermudez
Preceded by Panya Pradabsri	WBC light-flyweight champion 1 August – 28 November 2025; Status changed	Vacant Title next held by Knockout CP Freshmart
Honorary boxing titles
Inaugural champion	WBC light-flyweight champion In recess 28 November 2025 – present	Incumbent
