= Aiman Abu Bakar =

Malaysian boxer

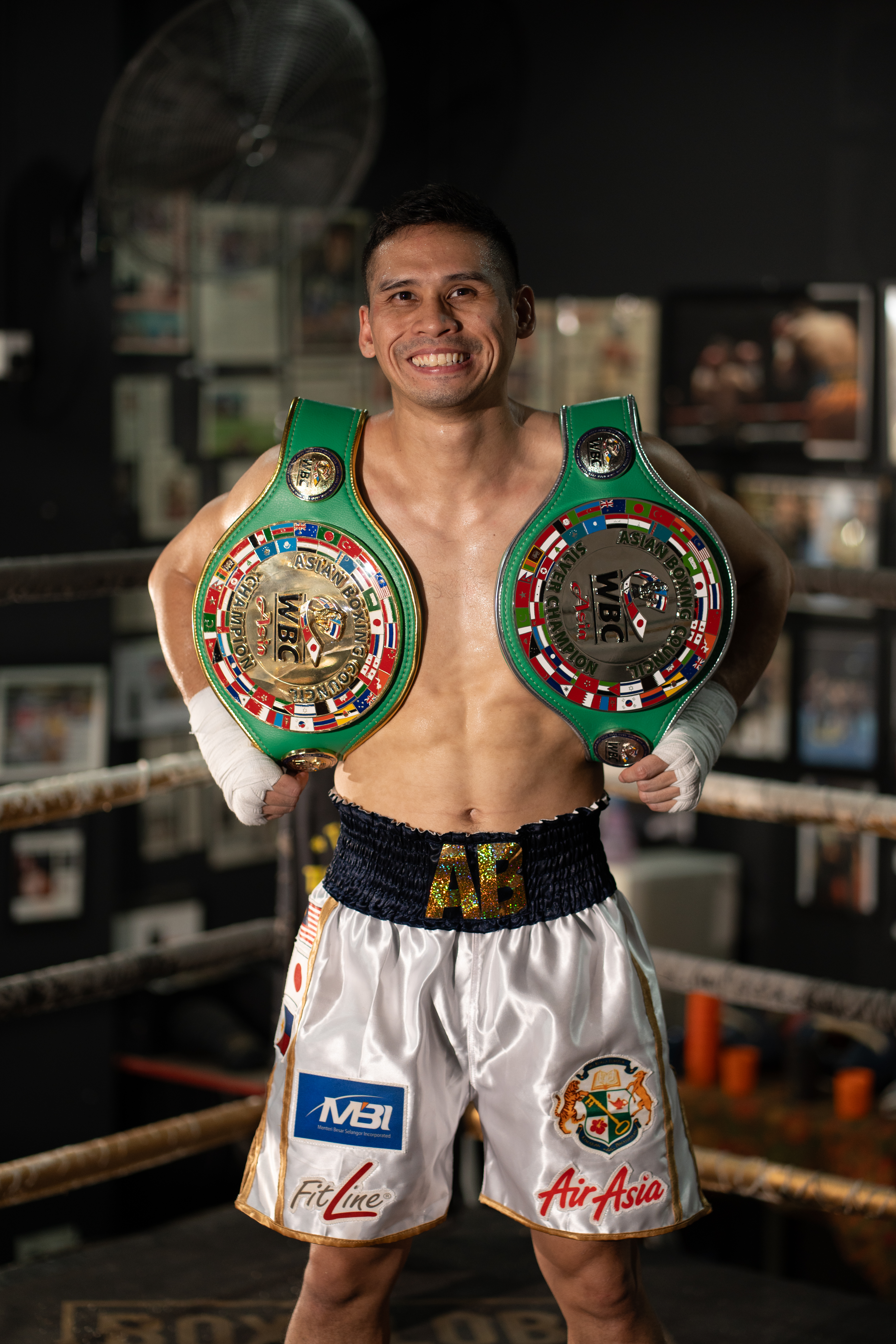
- Aiman Abu Bakar in 2026

Personal information
- Nickname: AB
- Born: Aiman Hisyam Abubakar; March 25, 1992 (age 34) Kuala Lumpur, Malaysia
- Height: 5 ft 7 in (170 cm)
- Weight: Super Featherweight; Featherweight

Boxing career
- Reach: 70 in (178 cm)
- Stance: Orthodox

Boxing record
- Total fights: 16
- Wins: 13
- Win by KO: 7
- Losses: 2
- Draws: 1

Aiman Abu Bakar (born March 25, 1992) is a Malaysian professional boxer who is the current World Boxing Council Asia Super Featherweight Champion since 2026.

== Professional boxing record ==
15 fights	12 wins	2 losses
By knockout	7	0
By decision	5	2
Draws	1	

No.	Result	Record	Opponent	Type	Round, time	Date	Location	Notes
16	Win	13–2–1	Keisham Luckysun Singh	UD	10	2026-04-11	Elorde Sports Center, Paranaque City, Metro Manila, Philippines	Won vacant WBC Asian Super Super Featherweight title
15	Win	12–2–1	Kasimu Hamad Haji	RTD	4 (10), 3:00	2025-08-10	Elorde Sports Center, Paranaque City, Metro Manila, Philippines	
14	Win	11–2–1	Patrick Luikhoto	KO	4 (10), 0:30	2025-08-10	Barangay Namayan Covered Court, Mandaluyong City, Philippines	Won vacant WBC Asian Silver Super Featherweight title
13	Loss	10–2–1	Arnon Yupang	UD	10	2023-11-05	General Trias Convention and Cultural Center, General Trias, Cavite, Philippines	For vacant WBC Asian Continental Super Featherweight title
12	Draw	10–1–1	Pablito Canada	MD	10	2023-08-19	The Flash Grand Ballroom of the Elorde Sports Complex, Paranaque, Philippines	
11	Win	10–1	JR Magboo	KO	1 (8), 0:26	2022-08-28	Racquettaz Badminton Center, Dasmarinas, Cavite, Philippines	
10	Loss	9–1	Asad Asif Khan	UD	8	2019-12-21	Manila Arena, Manila, Philippines	For vacant interim IBO Oceania-Orient featherweight title
9	Win	9–0	Wilford Wade	TKO	3 (6)	2019-10-06	Quibors Boxing Gym, Bacoor, Cavite, Philippines	
8	Win	8–0	Abdi	KO	4	2018-07-15	Axiata Arena, Kuala Lumpur, Malaysia	
7	Win	7–0	Germaine Dela Rosa	RTD	2 (8), 3:00	2017-11-24	Barangay Mangahan, Covered Court, Montalban, Philippines	
6	Win	6–0	Nestor Junio	UD	6	2016-07-30	Sucat Covered Court, Muntinlupa City, Philippines	
5	Win	5–0	Roy Lagrada	KO	1 (6), 0:42	2016-03-06	Makati Cinema Square, Boxing Arena, Makati City, Philippines	
4	Win	4–0	Gebby Manago	KO	2 (4), 1:38	2017-03-19	Makati Cinema Square, Boxing Arena, Makati City, Philippines	
3	Win	3–0	Jerry Kalaw	UD	4	2016-09-28	Sabang Gym, Danao City, Philippines	
2	Win	2–0	Jilo Alimar Francisco	UD	4	2016-04-30	Makati Cinema Square, Boxing Arena, Makati City, Philippines	
1	Win	1–0	Jerry Kalaw	UD	4	2015-12-02	Highway Hills Integrated School Gymnasium, Mandaluyong City, Philippines	

== See also ==
- Manny Pacquiao vs. Lucas Matthysse
