= Daiya Kira =

Japanese boxer (born 2003)

Daiya Kira 吉良大弥
Personal information
- Nickname: The Shining Diamond
- Born: 30 May 2003 (age 23) Kadoma, Osaka, Japan
- Height: 1.63 m (5 ft 4 in)
- Weight: Light flyweight; Flyweight; Super flyweight

Boxing career
- Reach: 156 cm (61 in)
- Stance: Orthodox

Boxing record
- Total fights: 5
- Wins: 5
- Win by KO: 4
- Losses: 0

Daiya Kira (吉良大弥, Kira Daiya; born 30 May 2003) is a Japanese professional boxer who has held the World Boxing Association (WBA) light flyweight title since September 2026.

== Early life ==
Kira was born in Kadoma at the Osaka Prefecture. His father ran a kickboxing gym and Kira began training kickboxing at 4 years old. Once he entered elementary school, he began training judo and boxing. He trained diligently, sparring with his two older sisters, and competed in martial arts tournaments. His two older sisters were both professional kickboxers, his eldest sister fought under the ring name Kira Chihiro, whilst his second eldest sisters fought under the ring name Kira Yuuki, whom is now retired.

== Amateur career ==
Kira defeated Kanamu Sakama in the final of the 32.5 kg division at the 2015 National U-15 Junior Boxing Tournament to claim the title. When Kira entered his first year of junior high school, Kira devoted himself entirely to boxing.

In 2019, Kira enrolled at Ōji Technical High School, a school renowned for boxing. During his first year of high school, Kira lost by decision to Kyosuke Takami at both the Inter-High School Championships and the National Sports Festival, missing out on the titles. In October, Kira won the 50-kg division at the ASBC-sponsored Asian Junior Championships held in the United Arab Emirates and was named the tournament's Most Valuable Player. In his second year of high school, he won the National High School Boxing Selection Tournament. In April of the same year, he competed in the flyweight division at the AIBA World Youth Championships held in Poland, advancing to the quarterfinals before losing by decision to Shakhzod Muzafarov of Uzbekistan. In August of that same year, he won the Inter-High tournament in his third year of high school, securing his second high school title.

In 2022, after enrolling at Tokyo University of Agriculture, he excelled as a regular starter in the Division 1 league competition from his freshman year onward, contributing to the team's victories by winning the flyweight division award, among other achievements. Aiming for the Paris Olympics, he also competed in individual events but was defeated by Kusako Makino in the final of the All-Japan Championships. At the All-Japan Championships the following year, Kira moved up a weight class to compete in the Olympic featherweight division. However, during his second-round match against Han Ryang-ho, Kira sustained a cut from an accidental head clash, causing the match to be stopped in the first round; suffering a 4–1 decision loss, effectively ending his path to the Olympics. Kira subsequently withdrew from college after Kira's sophomore year to turn professional. Kira concluded his amateur career with a record of 46–6.

== Professional career ==
=== Early career ===
On 27 June 2024, Kira made his professional debut against 5–2 Thai Khomsan Kaewruean in a scheduled six-rounds super flyweight bout at the Korakuen Hall in Tokyo, Japan. Kira won via first-round KO.

=== Rise up the ranks ===
After a merely three-fights win streak, Kira was scheduled to a 10-rounder WBA light flyweight title eliminator against Mexican Ivan Balderas on 31 December 2025 in Tokyo, Japan. Kira won via second-round KO, successfully becoming the number 1 challenger in the WBA's light flyweight rankings.

=== WBA light flyweight champion ===
==== Cancelled bout vs. Santiago ====
In May 2026, it was announced that a mandatory bout was ordered between Kira and reigning unified WBA and WBO light flyweight champion René Santiago with an expiration date of June 2. Pursuant to a championship rule, a champion is required to defend the title against the next leading available contender within 120 days from the date the title was obtained. Santiago won the title on 17 December 2025, and accordingly, the mandatory defence has been overdue since 16 April 2026, thus, he is required to defend the titles against Kira. On June 2, the day of the deadline, no agreement was met, where, the WBA granted another 30-days extension following a request from the parties involved.

==== Kira vs. Cañizales ====
Subsequently, the bout was ultimately scrapped, following the announcement of WBA's naming Santiago "champion-in-recess" due to an apparent injury. Former WBA (Regular) and current WBC (Champion-in-recess) light flyweight champion Carlos Cañizales was slated as a replacement, where Kira and Cañizales will fight for the vacant WBA light flyweight championship on 2 September 2026 in Yokohama, Japan. Kira won via seventh-round TKO to claim the vacant championship, winning a world championship within just 5 bouts, additionally, being the first to hand Cañizales a knockout loss.

== Professional boxing record ==
5 fights	5 wins	0 losses
By knockout	4	0
By decision	1	0

No.	Result	Record	Opponent	Type	Round, time	Date	Location	Notes
5	Win	5–0	Carlos Cañizales	TKO	7 (12), 0:38	2 Sep 2026	Yokohama Buntai, Yokohama, Japan	Won vacant WBA light-flyweight title
4	Win	4–0	Ivan Garcia Balderas	KO	2 (10), 0:27	31 Dec 2025	Ota City General Gymnasium, Tokyo, Japan	
3	Win	3–0	Jackson Zapata	UD	8	11 May 2025	Ota City General Gymnasium, Tokyo, Japan	
2	Win	2–0	Orlando Pino	KO	1 (8), 1:19	31 Oct 2024	Korakuen Hall, Tokyo, Japan	
1	Win	1–0	Khomsan Kaewruean	KO	1 (6), 1:58	27 Jun 2024	Korakuen Hall, Tokyo, Japan	

Sporting positions
World boxing titles
Vacant Title last held by René Santiago; Status changed	WBA light flyweight champion Regular title September 2, 2026 – present Non-regular title from September 2, 2026 – September 30, 2026	Incumbent
