= Lü Bin (boxer) =

Chinese boxer (born 1994)

Personal information
- Nationality: Chinese
- Born: 呂斌; October 18, 1994 (age 31) Yongkang, China
- Height: 5 ft 5 in (165 cm)
- Weight: Light-flyweight

Boxing career
- Stance: Southpaw

Boxing record
- Total fights: 6
- Wins: 4
- Win by KO: 2
- Losses: 2
Medal record
Men's amateur boxing
Representing China
Asian Amateur Championships
Bronze medal – third place	2013 Amman	Light-flyweight
AIBA Youth World Championships
Gold medal – first place	2012 Yerevan	Light-flyweight

Lü Bin
- Traditional Chinese: 吕斌
- Simplified Chinese: 吕斌
Transcriptions
Standard Mandarin
- Hanyu Pinyin: Lǔ Bīn

Lü Bin (Chinese: 吕斌; pinyin: Lǔ Bīn; born 18 October 1994) is a Chinese professional boxer who challenged for the WBA light-flyweight title in 2018. As an amateur he won a bronze medal at the 2013 Asian Amateur Championships in the light-flyweight division and represented China at the 2016 Summer Olympics, reaching the round of 16.

== Amateur career ==
=== Highlights ===
- Gold Medal (Light flyweight) at the 2012 AIBA Youth World Boxing Championships in Yerevan
- Bronze Medal (Light flyweight) at the 2013 Asian Amateur Boxing Championships in Amman
- Represented China at the 2016 Rio Olympic Games as a Light flyweight. Results were:
  - Lost to Peter Mungai Warui (Kenya) 1-2

== Professional career ==
Bin turned professional in 2017 and won by knockout on his debut before challenging Venezuelan boxer Carlos Cañizales for the WBA light flyweight (Regular) title in his second professional fight. Had Bin been won he would've beaten the record set by Saensak Muangsurin and Vasyl Lomachenko by 1 fight by becoming world champion in his second fight.

== Professional boxing record ==
6 fights	4 wins	2 losses
By knockout	2	1
By decision	2	1

No.	Result	Record	Opponent	Type	Round, time	Date	Location	Notes
6	Loss	4–2	(Philippines) Vencent Lacar	SD	10	Dec 28, 2024	Wuyuan River Stadium, Haikou, China	For vacant WBC Far East and WBO Oriental flyweight titles
5	Win	4–1	(Philippines) Nelbert Gaballo	UD	8	Aug 24, 2024	Elorde Sports Complex, Parañaque, Philippines	
4	Win	3–1	(Thailand) Stamp Kiatniwat	TKO	1 (10), 1:39	Mar 16, 2023	Yongkang Sports Center, Yongkang, Zhejiang, China	Won vacant WBA International super-flyweight title
3	Win	2–1	(China) ShanTuo Lu	UD	6	2 Oct, 2022	China	
2	Loss	1–1	(Venezuela) Carlos Cañizales	TKO	12 (12), 2:59	15 Jul 2018	Axiata Arena, Kuala Lumpur, Malaysia	For WBA (Regular) light-flyweight title
1	Win	1–0	(Thailand) Wanchai Nianghansa	TKO	3 (10), 2:41	29 Sep 2017	Heyuan Royal Garden Hotel, Beijing, China	
