= Panya Pradabsri =

Thai boxer

Panya CPF
Personal information
- Nickname: Ya
- Born: Panya Pradabsri (ปัญญา ประดับศรี); 21 February 1991 (age 35) Nam Yuen district, Ubon Ratchathani, Thailand
- Height: 5 ft 2 in (157 cm)
- Weight: Mini flyweight; Light flyweight; Flyweight

Boxing career
- Reach: 64 in (163 cm)
- Stance: Orthodox

Boxing record
- Total fights: 47
- Wins: 44
- Win by KO: 27
- Losses: 3

Panya Pradabsri (Thai: ปัญญา ประดับศรี; born: 21 February 1991), known by his ring name Panya CPF (previously Petchmanee Kokietgym and Petchmanee CP Freshmart), is a Thai former professional boxer. He is champion in two weight classes, including the World Boxing Council (WBC) mini-flyweight title from 2020 to 2023, and the WBC light-flyweight title from 2024 to 2025.

== Professional career ==
=== Background ===
Pradadsri (nickname: Ya, ยา) was born in Ubon Ratchathani province, Isan region, but grew up in Phra Nakhon Si Ayutthaya province, about 76 km (47.2 mi) north of Bangkok. He had more than 200 Muay Thai fights under the name "Porha Exindecongym" (ป.ห้า เอ็กซินดิคอนยิม). Later, he went to Bangkok to live and practice at the Muay Thai gym in the Bang Bon neighbourhood. He switched to boxing after being persuaded by Tepparith Kokietgym. He fought under the same manager as Kokietgym, Kokiet "Sia Ko" Panichayarom of the Kokiet Group. He had trained at Buakaw Banchamek's gym with Kompayak Porpramook as his partner.

He is currently under the stable of Virat "Sia Nao" Vachirarattanawong's Petchyindee Boxing Promotions, a former stable of his main rival Wanheng Menayothin, with the former Thai national amateur boxer and former WBC world flyweight champion Chatchai Sasakul as a trainer.

=== Early career ===
In his fourth professional fight, Pradabsri was scheduled to fight Ardi Tefa for the vacant WBC Asian Continental mini-flyweight title, on 19 November 2014. Pradabsri was the more dominant party, stopping the undefeated Tefa by a fifth-round technical knockout.

Pradabsri was scheduled to make his first title defense against Geboi Mansalayao, on 15 December 2015. The undefeated Pradabsri was the clear favorite over the 10-19-5 Mansalayao. He justified his role as the favorite, winning the fight by unanimous decision. Pradabsri notched two more title defenses, stopping both Ical Tobida on 11 March 2016 and Oscar Raknafa on May 6, 2016, by a sixth-round technical knockout.

On 4 October 2016, Pradabsri was scheduled to fight Heri Amol for the vacant PABA mini-flyweight title. He beat Amol by an eight-round decision. He would go on to defend his title twice, both defenses coming by technical knockout victories over Ellias Nggenggo.

On 3 October 2017, Pradabsri was scheduled to fight former WBC mini-flyweight champion Xiong Chaozhong for the vacant WBA International mini-flyweight title at Shanxi Datong University in Datong, China. He suffered his first and only loss to the former world champion by majority decision: 115–113, 116–112, 114–114.

Pradabsri fought Melianus Mirin for the vacant OPBF Silver mini-flyweight title, on 2 May 2018. He won the fight by unanimous decision. He defended the title once, by a sixth-round technical knockout against Stevanus Nana Bau, before vacating the title.

Pradabsri once again fought for the vacant OPBF Silver flyweight title, against Dexter Alimento, on 16 November 2018. He won the fight by a second-round knockout. Pradabsri once again notched a singular title defense before vacating the title, beating Robert Onggocan by a ninth-round technical knockout.

Pradabsri fought for the vacant OPBF Silver light-flyweight title for the third time in his career on 20 December 2019, against Jerry Tomogdan. Pradabsri secured the title by a first-round knockout, stopping Tomogdan after just 69 seconds.

=== WBC mini-flyweight champion ===
==== Pradabsri vs. Wanheng ====
Pradabsri was scheduled to challenge the reigning WBC mini-flyweight champion Wanheng Menayothin on 27 November 2020, in the latter's 12th consecutive title defense. Pradabsri was at the time the #5 ranked mini-flyweight in the WBC ranking. Wanheng came into the fight as an overwhelming favorite, with one media outlet describing Pradabsri as "a completely padded 34-1, with many of those wins coming against pro debuters and opponents with losing records". Pradabsri got off to a great start, stunning Wanheng with several solid shots in the first round. Wanheng won the second round, but seemed unable to find his rhythm by the end of the fifth round. Pradabsri kept to his outfighting tactics for the remainder of the bout, and won the fight by unanimous decision, with all three judges scoring the fight 115–113 in his favor. It was Wanheng's first loss in 55 professional fights. Pradabsri was then scheduled to fight a non-title bout with Pattharapong Rueangsilanon in Pattharapong's professional debut. He won the fight by a fourth-round technical knockout.

==== Pradabsri vs. Ngiabphukhiaw ====
Pradabsri made his first WBC mini flyweight title defense against the Thai national flyweight champion Danai Ngiabphukhiaw. Pradabsri was scheduled to face the #19 ranked WBC mini flyweight contender on 2 November 2021, in Nakhon Sawan, Thailand. Pradabsri won the fight by unanimous decision. Two of the judges awarded him a 117–111 scorecard, while the third judge scored it 118–110 in his favor.

==== Pradabsri vs. Wanheng II ====
On 7 November 2021, it was revealed that Pradabsri would rematch Wanheng Menayothin on 25 January 2022, in his second WBC mini-flyweight title defense. Pradabsri and Wanheng previously met on 27 November 2020, when Pradabsri handed Wanheng his first professional loss, beating the former champion by unanimous decision. The fight was later postponed for 29 March due to the passing of Pradabsri's father. Pradabsri won the fight by unanimous decision, with all three judges scoring the bout 117–111 in his favor. The bout was closely contested up to the fourth round, with two of the three judges having it as an even 38–38 draw, after which Prababsri began to take over. He dedicated the victory to his father who had died earlier.

==== Pradabsri vs. Tanaka I & II ====
Pradabsri was expected to make his third title defense against the former OPBF minimumweight champion Tsubasa Koura, who was ranked at #10 by the WBC at the time of the fight's booking. On 16 August, it was announced that Koura would be replaced by the #14 ranked WBC contender Norihito Tanaka. The bout headlined a card which took place in Nakhon Ratchasima, Thailand on 30 August 2022. Pradabsri won the fight by a dominant unanimous decision, with scores of 119–109, 116–112 and 118–110.

Pradabsri was expected to make his fourth mini-flyweight title defense against the unbeaten Yudai Shigeoka on 16 April 2023, at the Yoyogi National Gymnasium in Tokyo, Japan. The title bout was booked as the main event of "3150Fight Vol. 5", which was broadcast by Abema TV. Pradabsri withdrew from the fight on April 4, after being hospitalized with strep throat and an escalating fever. As Shigeoka instead faced Wilfredo Méndez for the interim WBC title, Pradabsri was rescheduled to face Norihito Tanaka on 28 June 2023, in Rayong, Thailand. It was an immediate rematch of their 30 August 2022 bout, which Pradabsri won by unanimous decision. He won the fight by an eighth-round technical knockout.

==== Pradabsri vs. Shigeoka ====
On 7 August 2023, the WBC held a purse bid for a title unification bout between Pradabsri and interim mini-flyweight champion Yudai Shigeoka. It was won by Kameda Promotions, who submitted a winning bid of $213,000, significantly higher than the $170,000 offered by Petchyindee Boxing Promotions.

=== WBC light-flyweight champion ===
==== Pradabsri vs. Cañizales ====
On 26 December 2024, as the #1 ranked, Pradabsri challenged the vacant WBC light-flyweight title against the #2 ranked and former WBA (regular) champion in this division Carlos Cañizales from Venezuela at Bangkok's Rajadamnern Stadium, Pradabsri's hometown.

The bout lasted all 12 rounds, with Cañizales advancing forward and landing clear and heavy punches, while the Thai boxer was the one who blocked and dodged. Towards the end of the 11th round, Cañizales landed a noticeably powerful punch to Pradabsri's face. When the fight ended, Pradabsri won by majority decision from three neutral judges, 114–114, 115–113 and 116–112.

==== Pradabsri vs. Cañizales 2 ====
A rematch with Carlos Cañizales took place at Poliedro de Caracas in Caracas, Venezuela, on 1 August 2025. Pradabsri was knocked out in the fifth round.

== Retirement ==
After losing by knockout to Cañizales in the rematch, he announced on his personal Facebook that he would hang up his gloves, following more than 25 years of experience in both Muay Thai and professional boxing.

== Professional boxing record ==
47 fights	44 wins	3 losses
By knockout	27	1
By decision	17	2

No.	Result	Record	Opponent	Type	Round, time	Date	Location	Notes
47	Loss	44–3	Carlos Cañizales	KO	5 (12), 2:52	1 Aug 2025	Poliedro de Caracas, Caracas, Venezuela	Lost WBC light-flyweight title
46	Win	44–2	Carlos Cañizales	MD	12	26 Dec 2024	Rajadamnern Stadium, Bangkok, Thailand	Won vacant WBC light-flyweight title
45	Win	43–2	Mehran Sadeghi	TKO	5 (6), 1:56	31 Jul 2024	International Stadium, Rangsit, Thailand	
44	Win	42–2	Adisak Ketpiam	TKO	3 (6), 0:58	26 Mar 2024	International Stadium, Rangsit, Thailand	
43	Win	41–2	Wichet Sengprakhon	TKO	2 (6), 2:36	20 Dec 2023	International Stadium, Rangsit, Thailand	
42	Loss	40–2	Yudai Shigeoka	UD	12	7 Oct 2023	Ota City General Gymnasium, Ōta, Tokyo, Japan	Lost WBC mini-flyweight title
41	Win	40–1	Norihito Tanaka	TKO	8 (12), 2:11	28 Jun 2023	Market Village HomePro, Rayong, Thailand	Retained WBC mini-flyweight title
40	Win	39–1	Norihito Tanaka	UD	12	30 Aug 2022	SaveOne Market, Nakhon Ratchasima, Thailand	Retained WBC mini-flyweight title
39	Win	38–1	Wanheng Menayothin	UD	12	29 Mar 2022	City Hall Ground, Nakhon Sawan, Thailand	Retained WBC mini-flyweight title
38	Win	37–1	Danai Ngiabphukhiaw	UD	12	2 Nov 2021	City Hall Ground, Nakhon Sawan, Thailand	Retained WBC mini-flyweight title
37	Win	36–1	Pattharapong Rueangsilanon	TKO	4 (6), 0:15	6 Mar 2021	International Stadium, Rangsit, Thailand	
36	Win	35–1	Wanheng Menayothin	UD	12	27 Nov 2020	City Hall Ground, Nakhon Sawan, Thailand	Won WBC mini-flyweight title
35	Win	34–1	Wichet Sengprakhon	RTD	4 (10), 3:00	25 Sep 2020	International Stadium, Rangsit, Thailand	Won vacant WBC-ABCO mini-flyweight title
34	Win	33–1	Hector Villa	UD	6	28 Aug 2020	International Stadium, Rangsit, Thailand	
33	Win	32–1	Mehrdad Kalvandi	TKO	3 (6), 1:40	21 Feb 2020	Sabpayom Market, Ayutthaya, Thailand	
32	Win	31–1	Jerry Tomogdan	KO	1 (10), 1:09	20 Dec 2019	Wat Muang School, Bangkok, Thailand	Won vacant OPBF Silver light-flyweight title
31	Win	30–1	?	TKO	2 (6)	29 Nov 2019	Sintawee Village, Bangkok, Thailand	
30	Win	29–1	Pagping Sapagdee	KO	3 (6), 1:20	2 Aug 2019	City Hall Ground, Nakhon Sawan, Thailand	
29	Win	28–1	Robert Onggocan	TKO	9 (10), 2:39	28 Jun 2019	Siam Paradise Entertainment Centre, Bangkok, Thailand	Retained OPBF Silver flyweight title
28	Win	27–1	Ramnarong Phokwiboon	KO	5 (6)	24 Apr 2019	City Hall, Sara Buri, Thailand	
27	Win	26–1	Suphakit Khampha	TKO	2 (6), 0:38	25 Jan 2019	Wat Kedkanudom, Pathum Thani, Thailand	
26	Win	25–1	Dexter Alimento	KO	2 (10)	16 Nov 2018	Sofia Hotel, Prachinburi, Thailand	Won vacant OPBF Silver flyweight title
25	Win	24–1	Adisak Ketpiam	TKO	5 (6), 1:38	26 Oct 2018	International Stadium, Rangsit, Thailand	
24	Win	23–1	Stevanus Nana Bau	TKO	6 (10), 1:48	21 Sep 2018	International Stadium, Rangsit, Thailand	Retained OPBF Silver mini-flyweight title
23	Win	22–1	Abdulvosid Buranov	PTS	6	29 Jun 2018	Ayutthaya Park, Ayutthaya, Thailand	
22	Win	21–1	Domi Nenokeba	PTS	6	25 May 2018	Lad Sawai Market, Pathum Thani, Thailand	
21	Win	20–1	Melianus Mirin	UD	10	2 May 2018	City Hall Ground, Nakhon Ratchasima, Thailand	Won vacant OPBF Silver mini-flyweight title
20	Win	19–1	Weerachad Srisuk	TKO	3 (6), 2:26	23 Mar 2018	SP Kansad Company, Bangkok, Thailand	
19	Loss	18–1	Xiong Chaozhong	MD	12	3 Oct 2017	Gym University, Datong, China	For vacant WBA International mini-flyweight title
18	Win	18–0	Silem Serang	UD	6	25 May 2017	Suamlum Night Bazaar, Bangkok, Thailand	
17	Win	17–0	Ellias Nggenggo	TKO	8 (12), 1:12	23 Feb 2017	9th Infantry Division, Kanchanaburi, Thailand	Retained PABA mini-flyweight title
16	Win	16–0	Ellias Nggenggo	TKO	7 (12)	22 Dec 2016	Amata Lanta Resort, Samut Prakan, Thailand	Retained PABA mini-flyweight title
15	Win	15–0	Heri Amol	RTD	8 (12), 3:00	4 Oct 2016	Ban Rai Temple, Nakhon Ratchasima, Thailand	Won vacant PABA mini-flyweight title
14	Win	14–0	Oscar Raknafa	TKO	6 (12)	6 May 2016	Suamlum Night Bazaar, Bangkok, Thailand	Retained WBC Asian Continental mini-flyweight title
13	Win	13–0	Ical Tobida	TKO	6 (12), 1:42	11 Mar 2016	Sawan Vegas Hotel, Suwannakhet, Laos	Retained WBC Asian Continental mini-flyweight title
12	Win	12–0	Iwan Key	TKO	3 (6)	29 Jan 2016	Namuang City Hall Ground, Nakhon Si Thammarat, Thailand	
11	Win	11–0	Geboi Mansalayao	UD	12	15 Dec 2015	Maejo University, Chiang Mai, Thailand	Retained WBC Asian Continental mini-flyweight title
10	Win	10–0	Jaysever Abcede	UD	12	30 Oct 2015	Sawan Vegas Hotel, Suwannakhet, Laos	Won WBO Oriental mini-flyweight title
9	Win	9–0	Taosaifah Laos PDR	KO	2 (6)	28 Aug 2015	Onefan Stadium, Bangkok, Thailand	
8	Win	8–0	Heri Purnomo	KO	3 (6)	24 Jul 2015	Bangbuathong, Thailand	
7	Win	7–0	Madit Sada	KO	3 (6)	18 Mar 2015	Sukjai Resort, Ayutthaya, Thailand	
6	Win	6–0	Richie Behec	UD	6	14 Feb 2015	Boxing World, Pattaya, Thailand	
5	Win	5–0	Jack Amisa	UD	6	9 Dec 2014	Nonthaburi, Thailand	
4	Win	4–0	Ardi Tefa	TKO	5 (12)	19 Nov 2014	The office of Kanjanadith District, Surat Thani, Thailand	Won vacant WBC Asian Continental mini-flyweight title
3	Win	3–0	Frans Damur Palue	UD	6	4 Oct 2014	Ban Rai Temple, Nakhon Ratchasima, Thailand	
2	Win	2–0	Domi Nenokeba	UD	6	29 Aug 2014	Wat Tako, Thailand	
1	Win	1–0	Wilber Andogan	UD	6	10 Jan 2014	Lat Sawai, Thailand	

== Titles in boxing ==
=== Major world titles ===
- WBC mini-flyweight champion (105 lbs)
- WBC light-flyweight champion (108 lbs)

=== Regional/International titles ===
- WBC Asian Continental mini-flyweight champion (105 lbs)
- WBO Oriental mini-flyweight champion (105 lbs)
- PABA mini-flyweight champion (105 lbs)
- OPBF Silver mini-flyweight champion (105 lbs)
- Asian mini-flyweight champion (105 lbs)
- OPBF Silver flyweight champion (112 lbs)

== See also ==
- List of male boxers
- List of world mini-flyweight boxing champions
- List of world light-flyweight boxing champions

Sporting positions
Regional boxing titles
Vacant Title last held by Donny Mabao	WBC Asian Continental mini-flyweight champion 19 November 2014 – 2017; Vacated	Vacant Title next held by Rey Caitom Jr.
Preceded by Jaysever Abcede	WBO Oriental mini-flyweight champion 30 October 2015 – 2016; Vacated	Vacant Title next held by Vic Saludar
Vacant Title last held by Samartlek Kokietgym	PABA mini-flyweight champion 4 October 2016 – 2017; Vacated	Vacant Title next held by Samartlek Kokietgym
New title	OPBF Silver mini-flyweight champion 2 May 2018 – 27 November 2020; Won world title	Vacant
Vacant Title last held by Jayr Raquinel	OPBF Silver flyweight champion 16 November 2018 – 2019; Vacated	Vacant Title next held by Sho Kimura
Vacant Title last held by Satanmuanglek CP Freshmart	Asian mini-flyweight champion 25 September 2020 – 27 November 2020; Won world title	Vacant Title next held by Yujie Zeng
World boxing titles
Preceded by Wanheng Menayothin	WBC mini-flyweight champion 27 November 2020 – 7 October 2023	Succeeded by Yudai Shigeoka
Vacant Title last held by Kenshiro Teraji	WBC light-flyweight champion 26 December 2024 – 1 August 2025	Succeeded by Carlos Cañizales
